= 2001 St. Louis Cardinals season =

Major League Baseball season

2001 St. Louis Cardinals
- National League Wild Card winners
- League: National League
- Division: Central
- Ballpark: Busch Memorial Stadium
- City: St. Louis, Missouri
- Record: 93–69 (.574)
- Divisional place: 2nd
- Owners: William DeWitt, Jr.
- General managers: Walt Jocketty
- Managers: Tony La Russa
- Television: Fox Sports Midwest; KPLR (Al Hrabosky, Bob Carpenter, Dan McLaughlin, Joe Buck)
- Radio: KMOX (Jack Buck, Mike Shannon, Joe Buck, Dan McLaughlin)

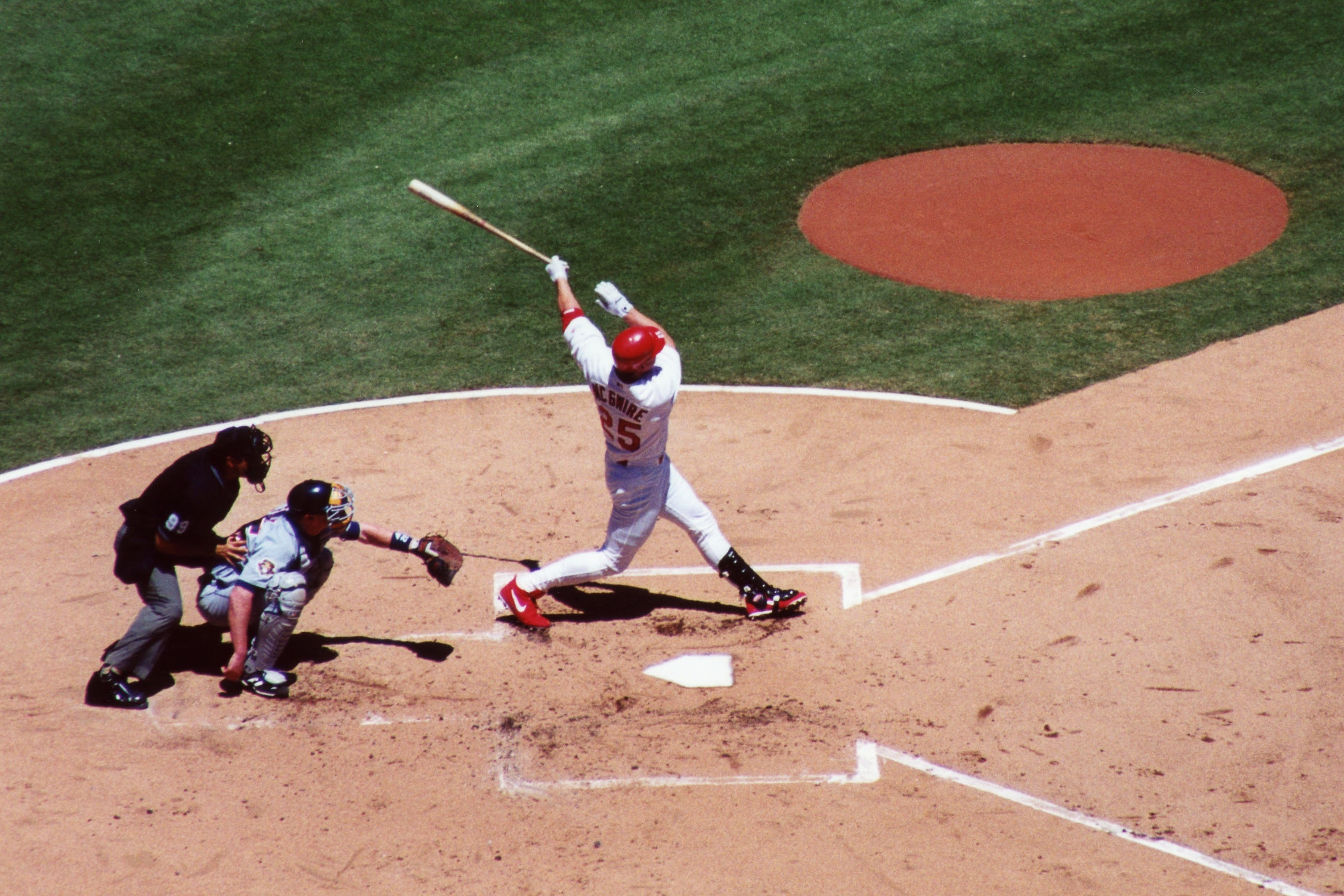
Mark McGwire belting his 564th of his career home run (moving him ahead of Reggie Jackson for sixth all-time home run leader) during a July 2001 game against the Detroit Tigers.

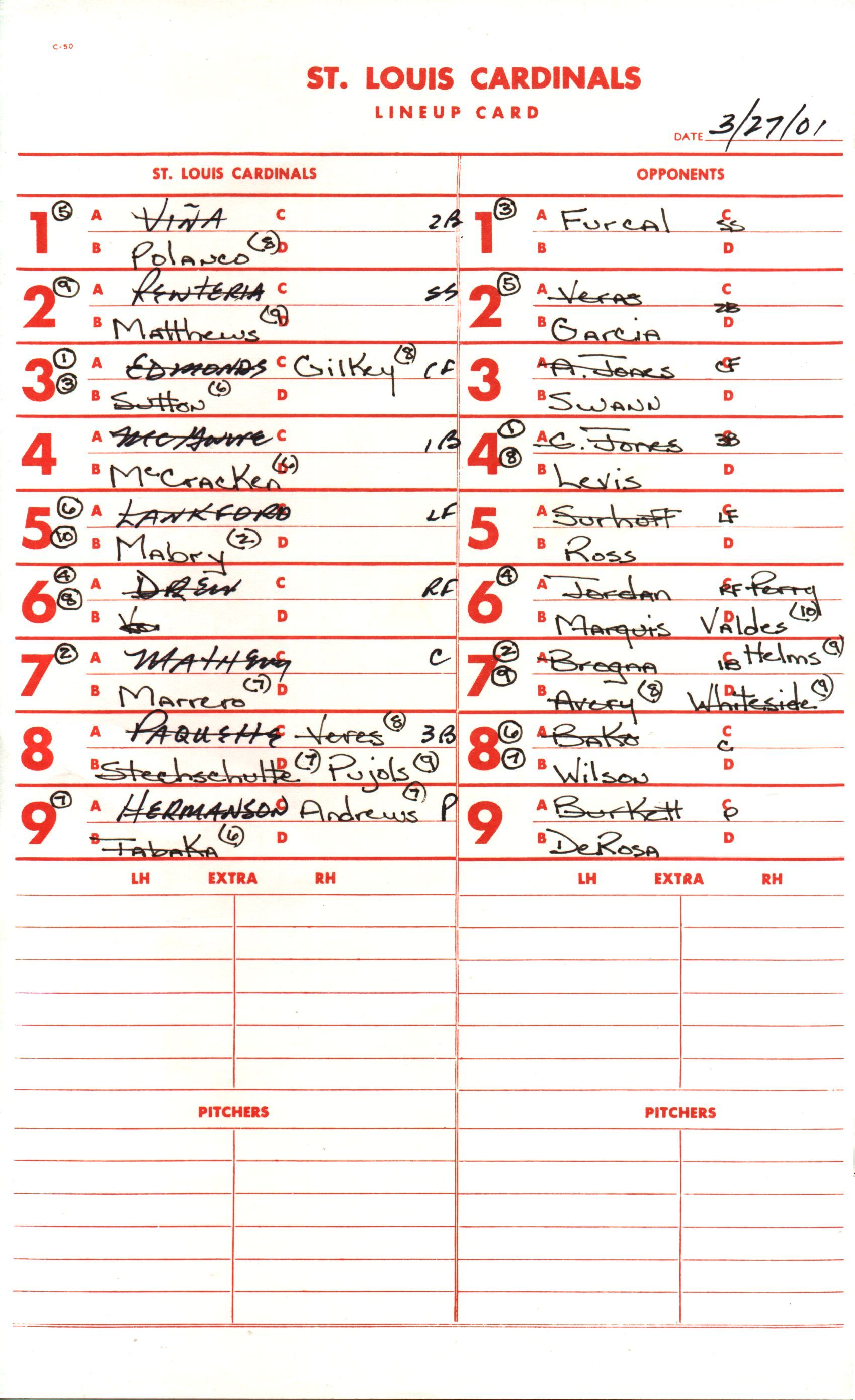
A lineup card for a 2001 spring training game between the St. Louis Cardinals and Atlanta Braves.

The 2001 St. Louis Cardinals season was the team's 120th season in St. Louis, Missouri and the 110th season in the National League. The Cardinals went 93–69 during the season and finished tied for first in the National League Central with the Houston Astros. Because the Cardinals and Astros were best two teams in the National League, both from the Central, and both finished five games ahead of the third-place Chicago Cubs, the Astros were awarded the NL Central champion and the number 1 seed in the playoffs due to winning the season series 9–7, and the Cardinals were awarded the wild-card.

In the playoffs the Cardinals lost to the eventual World Champion Arizona Diamondbacks 3 games to 2 in the NLDS.

Third baseman/Outfielder Albert Pujols won the Rookie of the Year Award this year, batting .329, with 37 home runs and 130 RBIs. Second baseman Fernando Viña and outfielder Jim Edmonds won Gold Gloves in 2001.

This was also Jack Buck's final season as the team's broadcaster.

== Offseason ==
- December 22, 2000: Quinton McCracken was signed as a free agent with the St. Louis Cardinals.
- January 5, 2001: Bobby Bonilla was signed as a free agent with the St. Louis Cardinals.
- January 5, 2001: John Mabry was signed as a free agent with the St. Louis Cardinals.
- March 28, 2001: Quinton McCracken was released by the St. Louis Cardinals.

== Regular season ==
Albert Pujols made his major league debut on April 2 against the Colorado Rockies. He appeared in three at-bats and collected one hit.

On September 3, Bud Smith became the ninth Cardinal and eighteenth rookie to hurl a no-hitter.

=== Season standings ===
NL Central
Team	W	L	Pct.	GB	Home	Road
Houston Astros	93	69	.574	—	44‍–‍37	49‍–‍32
St. Louis Cardinals	93	69	.574	—	54‍–‍28	39‍–‍41
Chicago Cubs	88	74	.543	5	48‍–‍33	40‍–‍41
Milwaukee Brewers	68	94	.420	25	36‍–‍45	32‍–‍49
Cincinnati Reds	66	96	.407	27	27‍–‍54	39‍–‍42
Pittsburgh Pirates	62	100	.383	31	38‍–‍43	24‍–‍57

==== Record vs. opponents ====
2001 National League record Source: MLB Standings Grid – 2001
Team	AZ	ATL	CHC	CIN	COL	FLA	HOU	LAD	MIL	MON	NYM	PHI	PIT	SD	SF	STL	AL
Arizona	—	5–2	6–3	5–1	13–6	4–2	2–4	10–9	3–3	3–3	3–3	3–4	4–2	12–7	10–9	2–4	7–8
Atlanta	2–5	—	4–2	4–2	4–2	9–10	3–3	2–5	3–3	13–6	10–9	10–9	5–1	3–3	4–2	3–3	9–9
Chicago	3–6	2–4	—	13–4	3–3	3–3	8–9	4–2	8–9	3–3	4–2	4–2	10–6	2–4	3–3	9–8	9–6
Cincinnati	1–5	2–4	4–13	—	3–6	4–2	6–11	4–2	6–10	4–2	4–2	2–4	9–8	2–4	4–2	7–10	4–11
Colorado	6–13	2–4	3–3	6–3	—	4–2	2–4	8–11	5–1	3–4	4–3	2–4	2–4	9–10	9–10	6–3	2–10
Florida	2–4	10–9	3–3	2–4	2–4	—	3–3	2–5	4–2	12–7	7–12	5–14	4–2	3–4	2–4	3–3	12–6
Houston	4–2	3–3	9–8	11–6	4–2	3–3	—	2–4	12–5	6–0	3–3	3–3	9–8	3–6	3–3	9–7	9–6
Los Angeles	9–10	5–2	2–4	2–4	11–8	5–2	4–2	—	5–1	2–4	2–4	3–3	7–2	9–10	11–8	3–3	6–9
Milwaukee	3–3	3–3	9–8	10–6	1–5	2–4	5–12	1–5	—	4–2	3–3	3–3	6–11	1–5	5–4	7–10	5–10
Montreal	3–3	6–13	3–3	2–4	4–3	7–12	0–6	4–2	2–4	—	8–11	9–10	5–1	3–3	2–5	2–4	8–10
New York	3–3	9–10	2–4	2–4	3–4	12–7	3–3	4–2	3–3	11–8	—	11–8	4–2	1–5	3–4	1–5	10–8
Philadelphia	4–3	9–10	2–4	4–2	4–2	14–5	3–3	3–3	3–3	10–9	8–11	—	5–1	5–2	3–3	2–4	7–11
Pittsburgh	2–4	1–5	6–10	8–9	4–2	2–4	8–9	2–7	11–6	1–5	2–4	1–5	—	2–4	1–5	3–14	8–7
San Diego	7–12	3–3	4–2	4–2	10–9	4–3	6–3	10–9	5–1	3–3	5–1	2–5	4–2	—	5–14	1–5	6–9
San Francisco	9–10	2–4	3–3	2–4	10–9	4–2	3–3	8–11	4–5	5–2	4–3	3–3	5–1	14–5	—	4–2	10–5
St. Louis	4–2	3–3	8–9	10–7	3–6	3–3	7–9	3–3	10–7	4–2	5–1	4–2	14–3	5–1	2–4	—	8–7

=== Transactions ===
- April 9, 2001: John Mabry was sent to the Florida Marlins by the St. Louis Cardinals as part of a conditional deal.
- June 5, 2001: Dan Haren was drafted by the St. Louis Cardinals in the 2nd round of the 2001 amateur draft. Player signed June 20, 2001.
- June 5, 2001: Joe Mather was drafted by the St. Louis Cardinals in the 3rd round of the 2001 amateur draft.
- June 5, 2001: Skip Schumaker was drafted by the St. Louis Cardinals in the 5th round of the 2001 amateur draft.

=== Roster ===
2001 St. Louis Cardinals
Roster
Pitchers: 66 Rick Ankiel; 31 Alan Benes; 40 Andy Benes; 48 Jason Christiansen; 63 Luther Hackman; 30 Dustin Hermanson; 65 Chad Hutchinson; 49 Mike James; 41 Jason Karnuth; 57 Darryl Kile; 44 Steve Kline; 37,33 T. J. Mathews; 60 Mike Matthews; 35 Matt Morris; 51,52 Bud Smith; 67,37,36 Gene Stechschulte; 46 Jeff Tabaka; 50 Mike Timlin; 43 Dave Veres; 19 Woody Williams	Catchers: 26 Eli Marrero; 22 Mike Matheny; 32 Keith McDonald; Infielders: 25 Mark McGwire; 24 Bobby Bonilla; 29 Stubby Clapp; 47 John Mabry; 27 Plácido Polanco; 3 Édgar Rentería; 28 Larry Sutton; 4 Fernando Viña	Outfielders: 41 Miguel Cairo; 7 J. D. Drew; 15 Jim Edmonds; 16 Ray Lankford; 21 Craig Paquette; 5 Albert Pujols; 13 Kerry Robinson; 23 Luis Saturria; Other batters: 28 Bill Ortega	Manager: 10 Tony La Russa; Coaches: 34 Mark DeJohn; 18 Dave Duncan; 19 Mike Easler; 38 Marty Mason; 39 Dave McKay; 11 José Oquendo

== Player stats ==
=== Batting ===
==== Starters by position ====
Note: Pos = Position; G = Games played; AB = At bats; H = Hits; Avg. = Batting average; HR = Home runs; RBI = Runs batted in

Pos	Player	G	AB	H	Avg.	HR	RBI
C	Mike Matheny	121	381	83	.218	7	42
1B	Mark McGwire	97	299	56	.187	29	64
2B	Fernando Viña	154	631	191	.303	9	56
SS	Édgar Rentería	141	493	128	.260	10	57
3B	Plácido Polanco	144	564	173	.307	3	38
LF	Ray Lankford	91	264	62	.235	15	39
CF	Jim Edmonds	150	500	152	.304	30	110
RF	J.D. Drew	109	375	121	.323	27	73

==== Other batters ====
Note: G = Games played; AB = At bats; H = Hits; Avg. = Batting average; HR = Home runs; RBI = Runs batted in

Player	G	AB	H	Avg.	HR	RBI
Albert Pujols	161	590	194	.329	37	130
Craig Paquette	123	340	96	.282	15	64
Eli Marrero	86	203	54	.266	6	23
Kerry Robinson	114	186	53	.285	1	15
Bobby Bonilla	93	174	37	.213	5	21
Larry Sutton	33	42	5	.119	1	3
Miguel Cairo	27	33	11	.333	1	7
Stubby Clapp	23	25	5	.200	0	1
John Mabry	5	7	0	.000	0	0
Luis Saturria	13	5	1	.200	0	1
Bill Ortega	5	5	1	.200	0	0
Keith McDonald	2	2	0	.000	0	0

=== Pitching ===
==== Starting pitchers ====
Note: G = Games pitched; IP = Innings pitched; W = Wins; L = Losses; ERA = Earned run average; SO = Strikeouts

Player	G	IP	W	L	ERA	SO
Darryl Kile	34	227.1	16	11	3.09	179
Matt Morris	34	216.1	22	8	3.16	185
Dustin Hermanson	33	192.1	14	13	4.45	123
Bud Smith	16	84.2	6	3	3.83	59
Woody Williams	11	75.0	7	1	2.28	52
Rick Ankiel	6	24.0	1	2	7.13	27

==== Other pitchers ====
Note: G = Games pitched; IP = Innings pitched; W = Wins; L = Losses; ERA = Earned run average; SO = Strikeouts

Player	G	IP	W	L	ERA	SO
Andy Benes	27	107.1	7	7	7.38	78
Mike Matthews	51	89.0	3	4	3.24	72

==== Relief pitchers ====
Note: G = Games pitched; W = Wins; L = Losses; SV = Saves; ERA = Earned run average; SO = Strikeouts

Player	G	W	L	SV	ERA	SO
Dave Veres	71	3	2	15	3.70	61
Steve Kline	89	3	3	9	1.80	54
Mike Timlin	67	4	5	3	4.09	47
Gene Stechschulte	67	1	5	6	3.86	51
Mike James	40	1	2	0	5.21	26
Luther Hackman	35	1	2	1	4.29	24
Jason Christiansen	30	1	1	3	4.66	19
T.J. Mathews	10	1	0	0	3.07	10
Alan Benes	9	2	0	0	7.36	10
Jeff Tabaka	8	0	0	0	7.36	3
Jason Karnuth	4	0	0	0	1.80	1
Chad Hutchinson	3	0	0	0	24.75	2
Bobby Bonilla	1	0	0	0	18.00	0

== NLDS ==
Arizona wins the series, 3–2

Game	Home	Score	Visitor	Score	Date	Series
1	Arizona	1	St. Louis	0	October 9	1–0 (AZ)
2	Arizona	1	St. Louis	4	October 10	1–1
3	St. Louis	3	Arizona	5	October 12	2–1 (AZ)
4	St. Louis	4	Arizona	1	October 13	2–2
5	Arizona	2	St. Louis	1	October 14	3–2 (AZ)

== Awards and honors ==
- Jim Edmonds, OF, Gold Glove Award
- Albert Pujols, 3B, National League Rookie of the Year Award
- Fernando Viña, 2B, Gold Glove Award

All-Star Game

- Matt Morris, P, reserve
- Albert Pujols, 3B, reserve

== Farm system ==
Level	Team	League	Manager
AAA	Memphis Redbirds	Pacific Coast League	Gaylen Pitts
AA	New Haven Ravens	Eastern League	Danny Sheaffer
A	Potomac Cannons	Carolina League	Joe Cunningham, Jr.
A	Peoria Chiefs	Midwest League	Joe Hall
A-Short Season	New Jersey Cardinals	New York–Penn League	Brian Rupp
Rookie	Johnson City Cardinals	Appalachian League	Chris Maloney
