= 2001 Philadelphia Phillies season =

Major League Baseball season

2001 Philadelphia Phillies
- League: National League
- Division: East
- Ballpark: Veterans Stadium
- City: Philadelphia
- Record: 86–76 (.531)
- Divisional place: 2nd
- Owners: Bill Giles
- General managers: Ed Wade
- Managers: Larry Bowa
- Television: WPSG; CSN Philadelphia
- Radio: WPHT (Harry Kalas, Larry Andersen, Andy Musser, Chris Wheeler, Scott Graham)

The 2001 Philadelphia Phillies season was the 119th season in the history of the franchise, and their first winning season, despite missing out on the playoffs, for the first time since their 1993 National League pennant winning season.

== Offseason ==
- November 29, 2000: Mark Brownson was released by the Philadelphia Phillies.
- December 15, 2000: Ricky Bottalico was signed as a free agent with the Philadelphia Phillies.
- January 29, 2001: Paul Byrd was signed as a free agent with the Philadelphia Phillies.

== Regular season ==
**Jim**; **Bunning**; RHP; Retired 2001
**Grover C.** **Alexander**; RHP; Honored 2001^{[a]}	**Chuck**; **Klein**; OF; Honored 2001^{[b]}

=== Season standings ===
NL East
Team	W	L	Pct.	GB	Home	Road
Atlanta Braves	88	74	.543	—	40‍–‍41	48‍–‍33
Philadelphia Phillies	86	76	.531	2	47‍–‍34	39‍–‍42
New York Mets	82	80	.506	6	44‍–‍37	38‍–‍43
Florida Marlins	76	86	.469	12	46‍–‍34	30‍–‍52
Montreal Expos	68	94	.420	20	34‍–‍47	34‍–‍47

==== Record vs. opponents ====
2001 National League record Source: MLB Standings Grid – 2001
Team	AZ	ATL	CHC	CIN	COL	FLA	HOU	LAD	MIL	MON	NYM	PHI	PIT	SD	SF	STL	AL
Arizona	—	5–2	6–3	5–1	13–6	4–2	2–4	10–9	3–3	3–3	3–3	3–4	4–2	12–7	10–9	2–4	7–8
Atlanta	2–5	—	4–2	4–2	4–2	9–10	3–3	2–5	3–3	13–6	10–9	10–9	5–1	3–3	4–2	3–3	9–9
Chicago	3–6	2–4	—	13–4	3–3	3–3	8–9	4–2	8–9	3–3	4–2	4–2	10–6	2–4	3–3	9–8	9–6
Cincinnati	1–5	2–4	4–13	—	3–6	4–2	6–11	4–2	6–10	4–2	4–2	2–4	9–8	2–4	4–2	7–10	4–11
Colorado	6–13	2–4	3–3	6–3	—	4–2	2–4	8–11	5–1	3–4	4–3	2–4	2–4	9–10	9–10	6–3	2–10
Florida	2–4	10–9	3–3	2–4	2–4	—	3–3	2–5	4–2	12–7	7–12	5–14	4–2	3–4	2–4	3–3	12–6
Houston	4–2	3–3	9–8	11–6	4–2	3–3	—	2–4	12–5	6–0	3–3	3–3	9–8	3–6	3–3	9–7	9–6
Los Angeles	9–10	5–2	2–4	2–4	11–8	5–2	4–2	—	5–1	2–4	2–4	3–3	7–2	9–10	11–8	3–3	6–9
Milwaukee	3–3	3–3	9–8	10–6	1–5	2–4	5–12	1–5	—	4–2	3–3	3–3	6–11	1–5	5–4	7–10	5–10
Montreal	3–3	6–13	3–3	2–4	4–3	7–12	0–6	4–2	2–4	—	8–11	9–10	5–1	3–3	2–5	2–4	8–10
New York	3–3	9–10	2–4	2–4	3–4	12–7	3–3	4–2	3–3	11–8	—	11–8	4–2	1–5	3–4	1–5	10–8
Philadelphia	4–3	9–10	2–4	4–2	4–2	14–5	3–3	3–3	3–3	10–9	8–11	—	5–1	5–2	3–3	2–4	7–11
Pittsburgh	2–4	1–5	6–10	8–9	4–2	2–4	8–9	2–7	11–6	1–5	2–4	1–5	—	2–4	1–5	3–14	8–7
San Diego	7–12	3–3	4–2	4–2	10–9	4–3	6–3	10–9	5–1	3–3	5–1	2–5	4–2	—	5–14	1–5	6–9
San Francisco	9–10	2–4	3–3	2–4	10–9	4–2	3–3	8–11	4–5	5–2	4–3	3–3	5–1	14–5	—	4–2	10–5
St. Louis	4–2	3–3	8–9	10–7	3–6	3–3	7–9	3–3	10–7	4–2	5–1	4–2	14–3	5–1	2–4	—	8–7

=== Transactions ===
- June 5, 2001: Ryan Howard was drafted by the Philadelphia Phillies in the 5th round of the 2001 amateur draft. Player signed July 2, 2001.
- June 5, 2001: Paul Byrd was traded by the Philadelphia Phillies to the Kansas City Royals for Jose Santiago.
- June 7, 2001: Rob Ducey was released by the Philadelphia Phillies.
- July 23, 2001: Gary Bennett was traded by the New York Mets to the Philadelphia Phillies for Todd Pratt.
- July 27, 2001: Felipe Crespo was traded by the San Francisco Giants to the Philadelphia Phillies for Wayne Gomes.
- July 27, 2001: Turk Wendell was traded by the New York Mets with Dennis Cook to the Philadelphia Phillies for Bruce Chen and Adam Walker (minors).

=== 2001 game log ===
Legend
	Phillies win
	Phillies loss
	Postponement
**Bold**	Phillies team member

2001 game log
Overall Record: 86–76
April (14–10)

#	Date	Opponent	Score	Win	Loss	Save	Attendance	Record
1	April 2	@ Marlins	6–5 (13)	**Amaury Telemaco** (1–0)	Vladimir Núñez (0–1)	None	36,146	1–0
2	April 3	@ Marlins	4–3	**Chris Brock** (1–0)	Braden Looper (0–1)	**José Mesa** (1)	10,257	2–0
3	April 4	@ Marlins	7–3	**Rhéal Cormier** (1–0)	Dan Miceli (0–1)	None	8,493	3–0
4	April 6	Cubs	2–3	Julián Tavárez (1–0)	**Randy Wolf** (0–1)	Jeff Fassero (2)	36,380	3–1
5	April 7	Cubs	4–8	Jason Bere (1–0)	**Vicente Padilla** (0–1)	None	16,847	3–2
6	April 8	Cubs	3–1	**Robert Person** (1–0)	Jon Lieber (0–1)	**José Mesa** (2)	15,550	4–2
7	April 9	Marlins	5–4	**Ricky Bottalico** (1–0)	Ricky Bones (0–1)	None	11,311	5–2
8	April 10	Marlins	7–6	**Wayne Gomes** (1–0)	Antonio Alfonseca (0–1)	**José Mesa** (3)	11,376	6–2
–	April 11	Marlins	Postponed (rain); Makeup: June 28 as a traditional double-header					
9	April 13	@ Braves	2–4	Tom Glavine (1–1)	**Randy Wolf** (0–2)	John Rocker (3)	31,017	6–3
10	April 14	@ Braves	2–1	**Omar Daal** (1–0)	Kevin Millwood (0–2)	**José Mesa** (4)	35,979	7–3
11	April 15	@ Braves	0–3	Odalis Pérez (1–1)	**Robert Person** (1–1)	John Rocker (4)	24,472	7–4
–	April 16	@ Cubs	Postponed (rain); Makeup: April 18 as a traditional double-header					
12	April 17	@ Cubs	6–3	**Vicente Padilla** (1–1)	Jeff Fassero (0–1)	**José Mesa** (5)	18,189	8–4
13	April 18 (1)	@ Cubs	3–4	Kevin Tapani (3–0)	**Bruce Chen** (0–1)	Jeff Fassero (7)	see 2nd game	8–5
14	April 18 (2)	@ Cubs	3–5	Jason Bere (3–0)	**Randy Wolf** (0–3)	Jeff Fassero (8)	26,793	8–6
15	April 20	Braves	8–3	**Wayne Gomes** (2–0)	Odalis Pérez (1–2)	None	16,245	9–6
16	April 21	Braves	4–1	**Robert Person** (2–1)	Greg Maddux (2–1)	None	17,123	10–6
17	April 22	Braves	3–2	**Amaury Telemaco** (2–0)	John Burkett (0–3)	**Wayne Gomes** (1)	26,756	11–6
18	April 23	@ Padres	5–3	**Bruce Chen** (1–1)	Adam Eaton (2–2)	**Ricky Bottalico** (1)	42,932	12–6
19	April 24	@ Padres	12–7	**Randy Wolf** (1–3)	Woody Williams (1–3)	None	13,872	13–6
20	April 25	@ Padres	5–3	**Omar Daal** (2–0)	Brian Tollberg (1–2)	**José Mesa** (6)	12,573	14–6
21	April 26	@ Padres	0–11	Kevin Jarvis (1–2)	**Robert Person** (2–2)	None	12,785	14–7
22	April 27	@ Dodgers	3–4	Terry Adams (2–1)	**Wayne Gomes** (2–1)	None	40,643	14–8
23	April 28	@ Dodgers	6–7	Matt Herges (1–1)	**Ricky Bottalico** (1–1)	Jeff Shaw (7)	37,322	14–9
24	April 29	@ Dodgers	1–4	Chan Ho Park (3–2)	**Randy Wolf** (1–4)	Jeff Shaw (8)	43,589	14–10

May (20–8)

#	Date	Opponent	Score	Win	Loss	Save	Attendance	Record
25	May 1	Rockies	7–1	**Omar Daal** (3–0)	Denny Neagle (2–1)	None	14,138	15–10
26	May 2	Rockies	2–6	Brian Bohanon (1–3)	**Robert Person** (2–3)	José Jiménez (7)	13,243	15–11
27	May 3	Rockies	7–5	**Amaury Telemaco** (3–0)	Pedro Astacio (3–2)	None	17,383	16–11
28	May 4	Giants	2–4	Liván Hernández (2–4)	**Bruce Chen** (1–2)	Robb Nen (8)	20,713	16–12
29	May 5	Giants	4–2	**Randy Wolf** (2–4)	Aaron Fultz (2–1)	**José Mesa** (7)	17,887	17–12
30	May 6	Giants	10–8	**Omar Daal** (4–0)	Kirk Rueter (3–3)	**José Mesa** (8)	25,206	18–12
31	May 7	@ Astros	5–0	**Robert Person** (3–3)	Kent Bottenfield (1–2)	None	31,511	19–12
32	May 8	@ Astros	3–2	**Amaury Telemaco** (4–0)	Mike Jackson (0–1)	**José Mesa** (9)	31,278	20–12
33	May 9	@ Astros	6–7	Billy Wagner (2–1)	**Ricky Bottalico** (1–2)	None	31,769	20–13
34	May 11	@ Diamondbacks	5–1	**Randy Wolf** (3–4)	Curt Schilling (5–1)	None	30,291	21–13
35	May 12	@ Diamondbacks	6–5 (10)	**Ricky Bottalico** (2–2)	Miguel Batista (1–2)	**José Mesa** (10)	33,515	22–13
36	May 13	@ Diamondbacks	1–6	Randy Johnson (4–3)	**Robert Person** (3–4)	None	32,223	22–14
37	May 15	Brewers	10–14	Curtis Leskanic (2–2)	**Ricky Bottalico** (2–3)	None	12,307	22–15
38	May 16	Brewers	1–6	Jimmy Haynes (4–4)	**Bruce Chen** (1–3)	None	12,105	22–16
39	May 17	Brewers	2–1 (12)	**Wayne Gomes** (3–1)	Mike DeJean (2–1)	None	12,433	23–16
40	May 18	Cardinals	5–4	**Omar Daal** (5–0)	Mike Timlin (1–2)	**José Mesa** (11)	17,085	24–16
41	May 19	Cardinals	3–2	**Robert Person** (4–4)	Andy Benes (3–3)	None	24,499	25–16
42	May 20	Cardinals	1–3	Dustin Hermanson (5–1)	**Amaury Telemaco** (4–1)	Dave Veres (5)	31,391	25–17
–	May 22	Pirates	Postponed (rain); Makeup: May 23 as a traditional double-header					
43	May 23 (1)	Pirates	4–0	**Randy Wolf** (4–4)	Jason Schmidt (1–2)	**Ricky Bottalico** (2)	see 2nd game	26–17
44	May 23 (2)	Pirates	5–2	**Omar Daal** (6–0)	Omar Olivares (2–5)	**José Mesa** (12)	13,337	27–17
45	May 24	Pirates	6–5	**Rhéal Cormier** (2–0)	Scott Sauerbeck (0–2)	**José Mesa** (13)	12,287	28–17
46	May 25	Expos	10–8	**Eddie Oropesa** (1–0)	Ugueth Urbina (0–1)	None	12,538	29–17
–	May 26	Expos	Postponed (rain); Makeup: May 27 as a traditional double-header					
47	May 27 (1)	Expos	7–5	**Chris Brock** (2–0)	Britt Reames (2–7)	**José Mesa** (14)	see 2nd game	30–17
48	May 27 (2)	Expos	3–7	Tony Armas Jr. (5–5)	**Paul Byrd** (0–1)	None	22,451	30–18
49	May 28	@ Mets	5–3 (10)	**José Mesa** (1–0)	Armando Benítez (3–2)	**Rhéal Cormier** (1)	33,791	31–18
50	May 29	@ Mets	7–3	**Wayne Gomes** (4–1)	Dennis Cook (1–1)	None	26,579	32–18
51	May 30	@ Mets	6–3	**Vicente Padilla** (2–1)	John Franco (1–1)	**José Mesa** (15)	24,077	33–18
52	May 31	@ Expos	5–2	**Rhéal Cormier** (3–0)	Scott Strickland (0–2)	**José Mesa** (16)	5,042	34–18

June (12–16)

#	Date	Opponent	Score	Win	Loss	Save	Attendance	Record
53	June 1	@ Expos	13–2	**Bruce Chen** (2–3)	Britt Reames (2–8)	None	5,267	35–18
54	June 2	@ Expos	5–12	Tony Armas Jr. (6–5)	**Randy Wolf** (4–5)	None	7,810	35–19
55	June 3	@ Expos	3–10	Masato Yoshii (2–2)	**Omar Daal** (6–1)	None	6,504	35–20
56	June 5	Mets	0–9	Rick Reed (6–2)	**Robert Person** (4–5)	None	22,060	35–21
57	June 6	Mets	6–1	**Amaury Telemaco** (5–1)	Glendon Rusch (3–5)	None	32,703	36–21
58	June 7	Mets	5–6	John Franco (2–1)	**José Mesa** (1–1)	Armando Benítez (9)	20,636	36–22
59	June 8	@ Red Sox	2–3	David Cone (1–1)	**Randy Wolf** (4–6)	Derek Lowe (7)	33,435	36–23
60	June 9	@ Red Sox	5–2	**Omar Daal** (7–1)	Pedro Martínez (7–2)	**José Mesa** (17)	32,944	37–23
61	June 10	@ Red Sox	4–5	Hideo Nomo (6–3)	**Rhéal Cormier** (3–1)	Derek Lowe (8)	32,767	37–24
62	June 12	@ Devil Rays	5–9	Joe Kennedy (2–0)	**Amaury Telemaco** (5–2)	None	12,602	37–25
63	June 13	@ Devil Rays	3–5	Bryan Rekar (1–7)	**Ricky Bottalico** (2–4)	Esteban Yan (7)	10,539	37–26
64	June 14	@ Devil Rays	3–6	Ryan Rupe (4–5)	**Randy Wolf** (4–7)	Esteban Yan (8)	11,606	37–27
65	June 15	Orioles	15–7	**Vicente Padilla** (3–1)	Willis Roberts (5–6)	None	18,710	38–27
66	June 16	Orioles	14–6	**Chris Brock** (3–0)	B. J. Ryan (2–3)	None	21,796	39–27
67	June 17	Orioles	7–10	José Mercedes (2–8)	**Amaury Telemaco** (5–3)	None	36,911	39–28
68	June 19	@ Pirates	5–8	Joe Beimel (3–2)	**Bruce Chen** (2–4)	Scott Sauerbeck (1)	33,713	39–29
69	June 20	@ Pirates	9–5	**Omar Daal** (8–1)	Bronson Arroyo (3–6)	None	28,145	40–29
70	June 21	@ Pirates	6–3	**Robert Person** (5–5)	Jimmy Anderson (4–7)	**José Mesa** (18)	29,560	41–29
71	June 22	@ Marlins	1–8	Ryan Dempster (8–7)	**Randy Wolf** (4–8)	None	16,321	41–30
72	June 23	@ Marlins	1–12	Matt Clement (4–5)	**Amaury Telemaco** (5–4)	None	23,638	41–31
73	June 24	@ Marlins	9–3	**Bruce Chen** (3–4)	Chuck Smith (4–3)	None	17,697	42–31
74	June 25	Braves	4–9	Greg Maddux (8–5)	**Omar Daal** (8–2)	None	22,439	42–32
75	June 26	Braves	1–4 (11)	Mike Remlinger (3–1)	**Wayne Gomes** (4–2)	José Cabrera (1)	23,747	42–33
76	June 27	Braves	4–10	Odalis Pérez (6–5)	**Randy Wolf** (4–9)	None	31,991	42–34
77	June 28 (1)	Marlins	6–5	**Robert Person** (6–5)	Ryan Dempster (8–8)	**José Mesa** (19)	see 2nd game	43–34
78	June 28 (2)	Marlins	8–7	**Rhéal Cormier** (4–1)	Braden Looper (3–3)	**José Mesa** (20)	18,094	44–34
79	June 29	Marlins	5–0	**Bruce Chen** (4–4)	Chuck Smith (4–4)	None	36,433	45–34
80	June 30	Marlins	6–4	**Omar Daal** (9–2)	A. J. Burnett (5–5)	**José Mesa** (21)	45,207	46–34

July (11–15)

#	Date	Opponent	Score	Win	Loss	Save	Attendance	Record
81	July 1	Marlins	8–1	**Nelson Figueroa** (1–0)	Brad Penny (7–2)	None	20,078	47–34
82	July 3	@ Braves	7–14	José Cabrera (5–2)	**José Santiago** (2–3)	None	34,142	47–35
83	July 4	@ Braves	4–1	**David Coggin** (1–0)	Odalis Pérez (6–6)	**José Mesa** (22)	46,579	48–35
84	July 5	@ Braves	5–9	Greg Maddux (10–5)	**Bruce Chen** (4–5)	None	32,031	48–36
85	July 6	@ Orioles	3–2 (10)	**Rhéal Cormier** (5–1)	Mike Trombley (2–2)	**José Mesa** (23)	40,086	49–36
86	July 7	@ Orioles	3–4	Jason Johnson (8–5)	**Nelson Figueroa** (1–1)	Buddy Groom (6)	49,072	49–37
87	July 8	@ Orioles	5–4	**Randy Wolf** (5–9)	Buddy Groom (1–3)	**José Mesa** (24)	47,210	50–37
–	July 10	**2001 Major League Baseball All-Star Game at Safeco Field in Seattle**						
88	July 12	Blue Jays	1–2 (11)	Kelvim Escobar (1–4)	**José Santiago** (2–4)	Billy Koch (17)	20,306	50–38
89	July 13	Blue Jays	5–2	**Omar Daal** (10–2)	Dan Plesac (2–3)	**José Mesa** (25)	18,279	51–38
90	July 14	Blue Jays	2–4	Joey Hamilton (5–6)	**Nelson Figueroa** (1–2)	Billy Koch (18)	22,418	51–39
91	July 15	Yankees	9–3	**Robert Person** (7–5)	Andy Pettitte (9–5)	None	59,470	52–39
92	July 16	Yankees	3–6 (13)	Mike Stanton (7–2)	**Amaury Telemaco** (5–5)	Mariano Rivera (30)	46,446	52–40
93	July 17	Yankees	1–4 (12)	Randy Choate (3–1)	**Wayne Gomes** (4–3)	Mariano Rivera (31)	47,529	52–41
94	July 18	@ Expos	6–7	Ugueth Urbina (1–1)	**Rhéal Cormier** (5–2)	None	5,157	52–42
95	July 19	@ Expos	2–5	Scott Strickland (2–4)	**Rhéal Cormier** (5–3)	Ugueth Urbina (14)	10,242	52–43
96	July 20	Mets	10–1	**Robert Person** (8–5)	Rick Reed (8–5)	None	22,886	53–43
97	July 21	Mets	3–6	Steve Trachsel (4–10)	**Randy Wolf** (5–10)	Armando Benítez (23)	33,181	53–44
98	July 22	Mets	3–2	**José Santiago** (3–4)	John Franco (4–2)	**José Mesa** (26)	30,812	54–44
99	July 23	Expos	0–3	Javier Vázquez (9–9)	**Omar Daal** (10–3)	None	16,921	54–45
100	July 24	Expos	10–2	**Nelson Figueroa** (2–2)	Tony Armas Jr. (8–9)	None	16,699	55–45
101	July 25	Expos	8–4	**Robert Person** (9–5)	Mike Thurman (5–7)	None	27,555	56–45
102	July 26	@ Mets	3–2	**José Santiago** (4–4)	Rick Reed (8–6)	**José Mesa** (27)	38,468	57–45
103	July 27	@ Mets	1–6	Steve Trachsel (5–10)	**David Coggin** (1–1)	None	31,263	57–46
104	July 28	@ Mets	3–4	Armando Benítez (4–3)	**Turk Wendell** (4–4)	None	38,972	57–47
105	July 29	@ Mets	5–6	Armando Benítez (5–3)	**Rhéal Cormier** (5–4)	None	38,536	57–48
106	July 31	@ Rockies	6–7	José Jiménez (5–1)	**Rhéal Cormier** (5–5)	None	36,005	57–49

August (14–14)

#	Date	Opponent	Score	Win	Loss	Save	Attendance	Record
107	August 1	@ Rockies	8–1 (6)	**Randy Wolf** (6–10)	Denny Neagle (6–6)	None	34,024	58–49
108	August 2	@ Rockies	4–2	**David Coggin** (2–1)	John Thomson (0–4)	**José Mesa** (28)	37,075	59–49
109	August 3	@ Giants	2–4	Félix Rodríguez (6–1)	**Rhéal Cormier** (5–6)	None	41,679	59–50
110	August 4	@ Giants	12–2	**Nelson Figueroa** (3–2)	Shawn Estes (8–6)	None	41,720	60–50
111	August 5	@ Giants	4–8	Liván Hernández (10–11)	**Robert Person** (9–6)	None	41,650	60–51
112	August 7	Padres	7–3	**Brandon Duckworth** (1–0)	Bobby J. Jones (7–14)	None	19,465	61–51
113	August 8	Padres	4–3	**David Coggin** (3–1)	Junior Herndon (0–1)	**José Mesa** (29)	24,202	62–51
114	August 9	Padres	2–6	Kevin Jarvis (9–9)	**Omar Daal** (10–4)	None	21,587	62–52
115	August 10	Dodgers	10–5	**Nelson Figueroa** (4–2)	James Baldwin (8–6)	None	16,298	63–52
116	August 11	Dodgers	7–3	**Robert Person** (10–6)	Éric Gagné (4–5)	None	25,344	64–52
117	August 12	Dodgers	3–2	**Brandon Duckworth** (2–0)	Terry Adams (8–5)	**José Mesa** (30)	21,477	65–52
118	August 14	@ Brewers	10–4	**David Coggin** (4–1)	Allen Levrault (5–8)	None	34,277	66–52
119	August 15	@ Brewers	8–6	**Omar Daal** (11–4)	Jamey Wright (8–8)	**José Mesa** (31)	31,030	67–52
120	August 16	@ Brewers	4–5	Rubén Quevedo (2–1)	**Nelson Figueroa** (4–3)	Curtis Leskanic (13)	34,110	67–53
121	August 17	@ Cardinals	3–4	Dave Veres (3–2)	**Turk Wendell** (4–5)	None	38,431	67–54
122	August 18	@ Cardinals	3–6	Steve Kline (3–3)	**Cliff Politte** (0–1)	Dave Veres (15)	45,437	67–55
123	August 19	@ Cardinals	0–9	Matt Morris (16–7)	**David Coggin** (4–2)	None	38,265	67–56
124	August 21	Astros	2–8	Pedro Astacio (8–14)	**Nelson Figueroa** (4–4)	None	20,647	67–57
125	August 22	Astros	2–1	**Robert Person** (11–6)	Wade Miller (13–7)	**José Mesa** (32)	21,288	68–57
126	August 23	Astros	1–2 (11)	Mike Jackson (4–2)	**José Santiago** (4–5)	Billy Wagner (29)	16,062	68–58
127	August 24	Diamondbacks	6–5	**Omar Daal** (12–4)	Brian Anderson (3–9)	**José Mesa** (33)	35,173	69–58
128	August 25	Diamondbacks	3–4	Miguel Batista (9–7)	**David Coggin** (4–3)	Byung-hyun Kim (13)	23,953	69–59
129	August 26	Diamondbacks	3–4 (10)	Byung-hyun Kim (4–3)	**Cliff Politte** (0–2)	None	35,093	69–60
130	August 27	Diamondbacks	3–1	**Robert Person** (12–6)	Albie Lopez (8–16)	**José Mesa** (34)	18,303	70–60
131	August 28	@ Mets	9–6 (11)	**Cliff Politte** (1–2)	Donne Wall (0–4)	**Ricky Bottalico** (3)	21,745	71–60
132	August 29	@ Mets	5–7	Bruce Chen (7–6)	**Omar Daal** (12–5)	Armando Benítez (34)	24,144	71–61
133	August 30	@ Mets	2–6	Steve Trachsel (8–11)	**David Coggin** (4–4)	None	33,734	71–62
134	August 31	Expos	1–5	Mike Thurman (7–10)	**Nelson Figueroa** (4–5)	Scott Strickland (4)	14,272	71–63

September (11–11)

#	Date	Opponent	Score	Win	Loss	Save	Attendance	Record
135	September 1	Expos	4–1	**Robert Person** (13–6)	Carl Pavano (0–3)	**José Mesa** (35)	16,770	72–63
136	September 2	Expos	2–6	Javier Vázquez (15–11)	**José Mesa** (1–2)	None	20,871	72–64
137	September 3	Mets	7–10	C. J. Nitkowski (1–3)	**José Mesa** (1–3)	Armando Benítez (35)	26,891	72–65
138	September 4	Mets	3–5	Steve Trachsel (9–11)	**Omar Daal** (12–6)	Armando Benítez (36)	14,020	72–66
139	September 5	Mets	4–7	Al Leiter (11–10)	**David Coggin** (4–5)	None	16,089	72–67
140	September 6	@ Expos	3–0	**Robert Person** (14–6)	Carl Pavano (0–4)	**José Mesa** (36)	3,406	73–67
141	September 7	@ Expos	2–4	Javier Vázquez (16–11)	**Brandon Duckworth** (2–1)	Scott Stewart (3)	4,451	73–68
142	September 8	@ Expos	6–0	**Randy Wolf** (7–10)	Tomo Ohka (3–8)	None	5,650	74–68
143	September 9	@ Expos	12–4	**Cliff Politte** (2–2)	Graeme Lloyd (8–5)	None	5,480	75–68
–	September 11–13	@ Braves	Postponed (September 11 attacks); Makeup: October 2–4					
–	September 14–16	@ Reds	Postponed (September 11 attacks); Makeup: October 5–7					
144	September 17	Braves	5–2	**Robert Person** (15–6)	Greg Maddux (17–9)	**José Mesa** (37)	27,910	76–68
145	September 18	Braves	4–3	**Ricky Bottalico** (3–4)	John Smoltz (2–3)	None	23,653	77–68
146	September 19	Braves	5–2	**David Coggin** (5–5)	John Burkett (11–11)	**José Mesa** (38)	24,036	78–68
147	September 20	Braves	1–5	Kevin Millwood (6–6)	**Randy Wolf** (7–11)	None	26,863	78–69
148	September 21	Marlins	1–0	**José Mesa** (2–3)	Vladimir Núñez (4–5)	None	15,129	79–69
149	September 22	Marlins	2–3	Matt Clement (9–10)	**José Santiago** (4–6)	Antonio Alfonseca (27)	23,017	79–70
150	September 23	Marlins	5–4 (10)	**José Mesa** (3–3)	Juan Acevedo (1–4)	None	29,109	80–70
151	September 25	Reds	1–8	Joey Hamilton (6–9)	**David Coggin** (5–6)	None	14,863	80–71
152	September 26	Reds	8–0	**Randy Wolf** (8–11)	Jared Fernández (0–1)	None	17,169	81–71
153	September 27	Reds	1–2	Lance Davis (8–3)	**Omar Daal** (12–7)	Danny Graves (29)	38,602	81–72
154	September 28	@ Marlins	5–6 (10)	Antonio Alfonseca (4–4)	**Cliff Politte** (2–3)	None	12,199	81–73
155	September 29	@ Marlins	5–4	**Brandon Duckworth** (3–1)	Brad Penny (9–10)	**José Mesa** (39)	19,732	82–73
156	September 30	@ Marlins	3–8	Josh Beckett (2–1)	**David Coggin** (5–7)	None	11,041	82–74

October (4–2)

#	Date	Opponent	Score	Win	Loss	Save	Attendance	Record
157	October 2	@ Braves	3–1	**Randy Wolf** (9–11)	Greg Maddux (17–11)	**José Mesa** (40)	30,739	83–74
158	October 3	@ Braves	3–8	Tom Glavine (16–7)	**Robert Person** (15–7)	None	27,431	83–75
159	October 4	@ Braves	2–6	John Burkett (12–12)	**Brandon Duckworth** (3–2)	None	32,283	83–76
–	October 5	@ Reds	Postponed (rain); Makeup: October 6 as a traditional double-header					
160	October 6 (1)	@ Reds	2–1	**Omar Daal** (13–7)	Elmer Dessens (10–14)	**José Mesa** (41)	see 2nd game	84–76
161	October 6 (2)	@ Reds	5–1	**David Coggin** (6–7)	Joey Hamilton (6–10)	None	22,886	85–76
162	October 7	@ Reds	4–1	**Randy Wolf** (10–11)	Lance Davis (8–4)	**José Mesa** (42)	20,093	86–76

=== Roster ===
2001 Philadelphia Phillies
**Roster**
**Pitchers**: 27 Ricky Bottalico; 45 Chris Brock; 34 Paul Byrd; 39 Bruce Chen; 48 David Coggin; 39 Dennis Cook; 33 Rhéal Cormier; 37 Omar Daal; 56 Brandon Duckworth; 57 Nelson Figueroa; 61 Wayne Gomes; 49 José Mesa; 51 Doug Nickle; 54 Eddie Oropesa; 44 Vicente Padilla; 31 Robert Person; 35 Cliff Politte; 40 Jose Santiago; 47 Amaury Telemaco; 50 Ed Vosberg; 13 Turk Wendell; 43 Randy Wolf	**Catchers**: 4 Gary Bennett; 19 Johnny Estrada; 24 Mike Lieberthal; 3 Todd Pratt; **Infielders**: 8 Marlon Anderson; 29 P. J. Forbes; 23 Kevin Jordan; 16 Travis Lee; 9 David Newhan; 9 Tomás Pérez; 34 Nick Punto; 17 Scott Rolen; 11 Jimmy Rollins	**Outfielders**: 53 Bobby Abreu; 5 Pat Burrell; 52 Felipe Crespo; 2 Rob Ducey; 6 Doug Glanville; 12 Brian Hunter; 22 Jason Michaels; 28 Reggie Taylor; 15 Eric Valent; **Other batters**: 4 Matt Walbeck; 25 Turner Ward	**Manager**: 10 Larry Bowa; **Coaches**: 21 Greg Gross; 7 Richie Hebner; 59 Ramon Henderson; 46 Vern Ruhle; 30 Tony Scott; 18 John Vukovich

== Player stats ==
=== Batting ===
==== Starters by position ====
Note: Pos = Position; G = Games played; AB = At bats; H = Hits; Avg. = Batting average; HR = Home runs; RBI = Runs batted in

Pos	Player	G	AB	H	Avg.	HR	RBI
C	Johnny Estrada	89	298	68	.228	8	37
1B	Travis Lee	157	555	143	.258	20	90
2B	Marlon Anderson	147	522	153	.293	11	61
SS	Jimmy Rollins	158	656	180	.274	14	54
3B	Scott Rolen	151	554	160	.289	25	107
LF	Pat Burrell	155	539	139	.258	27	89
CF	Doug Glanville	153	634	166	.262	14	55
RF	Bobby Abreu	162	588	170	.289	31	110

==== Other batters ====
Note: G = Games played; AB = At bats; H = Hits; Avg. = Batting average; HR = Home runs; RBI = Runs batted in

Player	G	AB	H	Avg.	HR	RBI
Brian Hunter	83	145	40	.276	2	16
Tomás Pérez	62	135	41	.304	3	19
Mike Lieberthal	34	121	28	.231	2	11
Kevin Jordan	68	113	27	.239	1	13
Todd Pratt	35	93	19	.204	2	7
Gary Bennett	26	75	16	.213	1	6
Felipe Crespo	33	41	7	.171	0	5
Eric Valent	22	41	4	.098	0	1
Rob Ducey	30	27	6	.222	1	4
Turner Ward	17	15	4	.267	0	2
Reggie Taylor	5	7	0	.000	0	0
P.J. Forbes	3	7	2	.286	0	1
David Newhan	7	6	2	.333	0	1
Jason Michaels	6	6	1	.167	0	1
Nick Punto	4	5	2	.400	0	0
Matt Walbeck	1	1	1	1.000	0	0

=== Pitching ===
==== Starting pitchers ====
Note: G = Games pitched; IP = Innings pitched; W = Wins; L = Losses; ERA = Earned run average; SO = Strikeouts

Player	G	IP	W	L	ERA	SO
Robert Person	33	208.1	15	7	4.19	183
Omar Daal	32	185.2	13	7	4.46	107
Randy Wolf	28	163.0	10	11	3.70	152
Dave Coggin	17	95.0	6	7	4.17	62
Bruce Chen	16	86.1	4	5	5.00	79
Brandon Duckworth	11	69.0	3	2	3.52	40

==== Other pitchers ====
Note: G = Games pitched; IP = Innings pitched; W = Wins; L = Losses; ERA = Earned run average; SO = Strikeouts

Player	G	IP	W	L	ERA	SO
Amaury Telemaco	24	89.1	5	5	5.54	59
Nelson Figueroa	19	89.0	4	5	3.94	61
Paul Byrd	3	10.0	0	1	8.10	3

==== Relief pitchers ====
Note: G = Games pitched; W = Wins; L = Losses; SV = Saves; ERA = Earned run average; SO = Strikeouts

Player	G	W	L	SV	ERA	SO
José Mesa	71	3	3	42	2.34	59
Ricky Bottalico	66	3	4	3	3.90	57
Rhéal Cormier	60	5	6	1	4.21	37
José Santiago	53	2	4	0	3.61	28
Wayne Gomes	42	4	3	1	4.31	35
Eddie Oropesa	30	1	0	0	4.74	15
Chris Brock	24	3	0	0	4.13	26
Vicente Padilla	23	3	1	0	4.24	29
Cliff Politte	23	2	3	0	2.42	23
Turk Wendell	21	0	2	0	7.47	15
Dennis Cook	19	0	0	0	5.59	4
Ed Vosberg	18	0	0	0	2.84	11
Doug Nickle	2	0	0	0	0.00	1

== Farm system ==
Level	Team	League	Manager
AAA	Scranton/Wilkes-Barre; Red Barons	International League	Marc Bombard and Jerry Martin
AA	Reading Phillies	Eastern League	Gary Varsho
A	Clearwater Phillies	Florida State League	Ramón Avilés
A	Lakewood BlueClaws	South Atlantic League	Greg Legg
A-Short Season	Batavia Muckdogs	New York–Penn League	Frank Klebe
Rookie	GCL Phillies	Gulf Coast League	Roly de Armas

LEAGUE CO-CHAMPIONS: Reading
