= 2001 Los Angeles Dodgers season =

2001 Los Angeles Dodgers
- League: National League
- Division: West
- Ballpark: Dodger Stadium
- City: Los Angeles
- Record: 86–76 (.531)
- Divisional place: 3rd
- Owners: Fox Entertainment Group
- President: Bob Graziano
- General managers: Kevin Malone, Dave Wallace
- Managers: Jim Tracy
- Television: Fox Sports Net West 2; KTLA(5)
- Radio: XTRA Sports 1150 (Vin Scully, Ross Porter, Rick Monday); KWKW (Jaime Jarrín, Pepe Yñiguez}

The 2001 Los Angeles Dodgers season was the 112th for the franchise in Major League Baseball, and their 44th season in Los Angeles, California. It was the first season with Jim Tracy as manager, after serving as the bench coach the previous two seasons.

On July 28, the Dodgers were 61–44, leading the NL West by 2 games ahead of the Arizona Diamondbacks; however, the Dodgers would fade and lose 32 of their last 57 games, finishing third in the National League West, and six games behind the eventual World Series champion Arizona. This was their last season to be broadcast by KTLA (5).

Shawn Green had his best season, hitting a Dodger-record 49 home runs and also setting L.A. records for extra-base hits (84) and total bases (358). Paul Lo Duca became the full-time catcher and led the team with a .320 batting average and Jeff Shaw became the Dodgers all-time leader in saves, with 129.

== Offseason ==
- February 25, 2001: Acquired Marquis Grissom and Ruddy Lugo from the Milwaukee Brewers for Devon White
- March 13, 2001: Scott Service was released by the Los Angeles Dodgers.
- March 18, 2001: Acquired Gary Majewski, Andre Simpson and Orlando Rodriguez from the Chicago White Sox for Antonio Osuna and Carlos Ortega
- March 28, 2001: Traded Mike Judd to the Tampa Bay Devil Rays for a player to be named later
- March 28, 2001: Ramón Martínez was released by the Dodgers.

== Regular season ==
=== Season standings ===
NL West
Team	W	L	Pct.	GB	Home	Road
Arizona Diamondbacks	92	70	.568	—	48‍–‍33	44‍–‍37
San Francisco Giants	90	72	.556	2	49‍–‍32	41‍–‍40
Los Angeles Dodgers	86	76	.531	6	44‍–‍37	42‍–‍39
San Diego Padres	79	83	.488	13	35‍–‍46	44‍–‍37
Colorado Rockies	73	89	.451	19	41‍–‍40	32‍–‍49

==== Record vs. opponents ====
2001 National League record Source: MLB Standings Grid – 2001
Team	AZ	ATL	CHC	CIN	COL	FLA	HOU	LAD	MIL	MON	NYM	PHI	PIT	SD	SF	STL	AL
Arizona	—	5–2	6–3	5–1	13–6	4–2	2–4	10–9	3–3	3–3	3–3	3–4	4–2	12–7	10–9	2–4	7–8
Atlanta	2–5	—	4–2	4–2	4–2	9–10	3–3	2–5	3–3	13–6	10–9	10–9	5–1	3–3	4–2	3–3	9–9
Chicago	3–6	2–4	—	13–4	3–3	3–3	8–9	4–2	8–9	3–3	4–2	4–2	10–6	2–4	3–3	9–8	9–6
Cincinnati	1–5	2–4	4–13	—	3–6	4–2	6–11	4–2	6–10	4–2	4–2	2–4	9–8	2–4	4–2	7–10	4–11
Colorado	6–13	2–4	3–3	6–3	—	4–2	2–4	8–11	5–1	3–4	4–3	2–4	2–4	9–10	9–10	6–3	2–10
Florida	2–4	10–9	3–3	2–4	2–4	—	3–3	2–5	4–2	12–7	7–12	5–14	4–2	3–4	2–4	3–3	12–6
Houston	4–2	3–3	9–8	11–6	4–2	3–3	—	2–4	12–5	6–0	3–3	3–3	9–8	3–6	3–3	9–7	9–6
Los Angeles	9–10	5–2	2–4	2–4	11–8	5–2	4–2	—	5–1	2–4	2–4	3–3	7–2	9–10	11–8	3–3	6–9
Milwaukee	3–3	3–3	9–8	10–6	1–5	2–4	5–12	1–5	—	4–2	3–3	3–3	6–11	1–5	5–4	7–10	5–10
Montreal	3–3	6–13	3–3	2–4	4–3	7–12	0–6	4–2	2–4	—	8–11	9–10	5–1	3–3	2–5	2–4	8–10
New York	3–3	9–10	2–4	2–4	3–4	12–7	3–3	4–2	3–3	11–8	—	11–8	4–2	1–5	3–4	1–5	10–8
Philadelphia	4–3	9–10	2–4	4–2	4–2	14–5	3–3	3–3	3–3	10–9	8–11	—	5–1	5–2	3–3	2–4	7–11
Pittsburgh	2–4	1–5	6–10	8–9	4–2	2–4	8–9	2–7	11–6	1–5	2–4	1–5	—	2–4	1–5	3–14	8–7
San Diego	7–12	3–3	4–2	4–2	10–9	4–3	6–3	10–9	5–1	3–3	5–1	2–5	4–2	—	5–14	1–5	6–9
San Francisco	9–10	2–4	3–3	2–4	10–9	4–2	3–3	8–11	4–5	5–2	4–3	3–3	5–1	14–5	—	4–2	10–5
St. Louis	4–2	3–3	8–9	10–7	3–6	3–3	7–9	3–3	10–7	4–2	5–1	4–2	14–3	5–1	2–4	—	8–7

=== Opening Day lineup ===
Opening Day starters
Name	Position
Tom Goodwin	Center fielder
Mark Grudzielanek	Second baseman
Gary Sheffield	Left fielder
Shawn Green	Right fielder
Eric Karros	First baseman
Chris Donnels	Third baseman
Chad Kreuter	Catcher
Alex Cora	Shortstop
Chan Ho Park	Starting pitcher

=== Notable transactions ===
- April 1, 2001: Doug Linton was released.
- July 13, 2001: Acquired McKay Christensen from the Chicago White Sox for Wade Parrish.
- July 26, 2001: Acquired James Baldwin and cash from the Chicago White Sox for Jeff Barry, Gary Majewski and Onan Masaoka.
- July 31, 2001: Acquired Terry Mulholland from the Pittsburgh Pirates for Adrian Burnside and Mike Fetters.
- July 31, 2001: Acquired Mike Trombley from the Baltimore Orioles for Kris Foster and Gerónimo Gil.

=== Roster ===
2001 Los Angeles Dodgers
Roster
Pitchers: 51 Terry Adams; 43 Andy Ashby; 30 James Baldwin; 27 Kevin Brown; 55 Giovanni Carrara; 37 Darren Dreifort; 56 Mike Fetters; 38 Éric Gagné; 49 Matt Herges; 45 Terry Mulholland; 62 José Antonio Núñez; 47 Jesse Orosco; 30 Gregg Olson; 61 Chan Ho Park; 57 Luke Prokopec; 52 Al Reyes; 41 Jeff Shaw; 56 Dennis Springer; 40 Mike Trombley; 54 Jeff Williams	Catchers: 26 Brian Johnson; 21 Chad Kreuter; 16 Paul Lo Duca; 36 Ángel Peña; Infielders: 29 Adrián Beltré; 33 Hiram Bocachica; 18 Tim Bogar; 7 Jeff Branson; 3 Alex Cora; 50 Chris Donnels; 8 Mark Grudzielanek; 25 Dave Hansen; 44 Phil Hiatt; 23 Eric Karros; 14 Jeff Reboulet	Outfielders: 46 Bruce Aven; 59 McKay Christensen; 28 Tom Goodwin; 15 Shawn Green; 9 Marquis Grissom; 10 Gary Sheffield	Manager: 12 Jim Tracy; Coaches: 22 Jack Clark (hitting); 48 Jim Colborn (pitching); 35 Glenn Hoffman (third base); 17 Jim Lett (bullpen); 11 Manny Mota; 5 Jim Riggleman (bench); 31 John Shelby (1st base)

== Starting Pitchers stats ==
Note: G = Games pitched; GS = Games started; IP = Innings pitched; W/L = Wins/Losses; ERA = Earned run average; BB = Walks allowed; SO = Strikeouts; CG = Complete games

Name	G	GS	IP	W/L	ERA	BB	SO	CG
Chan Ho Park	36	35	234.0	15-11	3.50	91	218	2
Terry Adams	43	22	166.1	12-8	4.33	54	141	0
Éric Gagné	33	24	151.2	6-7	4.75	46	130	0
Luke Prokopec	29	22	138.1	8-7	4.88	40	91	0
Kevin Brown	20	19	115.2	10-4	2.65	38	104	1
Darren Dreifort	16	16	94.2	4-7	5.13	47	91	0
James Baldwin	12	12	79.1	3-6	4.20	25	53	0
Dennis Springer	4	3	19.0	1-1	3.32	2	7	0
Andy Ashby	2	2	11.2	2-0	3.86	1	7	0

== Relief Pitchers stats ==
Note: G = Games pitched; GS = Games started; IP = Innings pitched; W/L = Wins/Losses; ERA = Earned run average; BB = Walks allowed; SO = Strikeouts; SV = Saves

Name	G	GS	IP	W/L	ERA	BB	SO	SV
Jeff Shaw	77	0	74.2	3-5	3.62	18	58	43
Matt Herges	75	0	99.1	9-8	3.44	46	76	1
Giovanni Carrara	47	3	85.1	6-1	3.16	24	70	0
Jesse Orosco	35	0	16.0	0-1	3.94	7	21	0
Mike Fetters	34	0	29.2	2-1	6.07	13	26	1
Terry Mulholland	19	3	29.1	1-1	5.83	7	25	0
Al Reyes	19	0	25.2	2-1	3.86	13	23	1
Gregg Olson	28	0	24.2	0-1	8.03	20	24	0
Jeff Williams	15	1	24.1	2-1	6.29	17	9	0
Mike Trombley	19	0	23.1	0-4	6.56	10	27	0
José Antonio Núñez	6	0	7.1	0-1	13.50	5	11	0

== Batting Stats ==
Note: Pos = Position; G = Games played; AB = At bats; Avg. = Batting average; R = Runs scored; H = Hits; HR = Home runs; RBI = Runs batted in; SB = Stolen bases

Name	Pos	G	AB	Avg.	R	H	HR	RBI	SB
Paul Lo Duca	C/1B/LF/RF	125	460	.320	71	147	25	90	2
Chad Kreuter	C	73	191	.215	21	41	6	17	0
Ángel Peña	C	22	54	.204	3	11	1	2	0
Brian Johnson	C	3	4	.250	0	1	0	1	0
Eric Karros	1B	121	438	.235	42	103	15	63	3
Mark Grudzielanek	2B	133	539	.271	83	146	13	55	4
Alex Cora	SS/2B	134	405	.217	38	88	4	29	0
Adrián Beltré	3B/SS	126	475	.265	59	126	13	60	13
Jeff Reboulet	2B/SS/3B/LF	94	215	.266	35	57	3	22	0
Dave Hansen	1B/3B	92	140	.236	13	33	2	20	0
Hiram Bocachica	2B/3B/LF/RF	75	133	.233	15	31	2	9	4
Chris Donnels	1B/3B	66	88	.170	8	15	3	8	0
Jeff Branson	2B/SS/3B	13	21	.286	3	6	0	0	0
Phil Hiatt	1B/3B	30	50	.240	6	12	2	6	0
Tim Bogar	1B/3B/SS	12	15	.333	4	5	2	2	0
Shawn Green	RF/CF/1B	161	619	.297	121	184	49	125	20
Marquis Grissom	CF/LF/RF	135	448	.221	56	99	21	60	7
Gary Sheffield	LF/RF	143	515	.311	98	160	36	100	10
Tom Goodwin	CF/LF	105	286	.231	51	66	4	22	22
McKay Christensen	CF/LF	28	49	.327	7	16	1	7	3
Bruce Aven	LF/RF	21	24	.333	3	8	1	2	0

== 2001 Awards ==
- 2001 Major League Baseball All-Star Game
  - Chan Ho Park reserve
  - Jeff Shaw reserve
- NL Player of the Week
  - Gary Sheffield (April 9–15)

== Farm system ==
Level	Team	League	Manager
AAA	Las Vegas 51s	Pacific Coast League	Rick Sofield
**AA**	**Jacksonville Suns**	**Southern League**	**John Shoemaker**
High A	Vero Beach Dodgers	Florida State League	Bob Mariano
A	Wilmington Waves	South Atlantic League	Dino Ebel
Rookie	Great Falls Dodgers	Pioneer League	Dave Silvestri
Rookie	Gulf Coast Dodgers	Gulf Coast League	Juan Bustabad
Rookie	DSL Dodgers	Dominican Summer League	

Teams in BOLD won League Championships

== Major League Baseball draft ==
The Dodgers selected 49 players in this draft. Of those, only three of them would eventually play Major League baseball. They lost their first round pick this year to the Atlanta Braves as a result of their signing free agent pitcher Andy Ashby. The second round pick was right-handed pitcher Billy Pilkington from Santiago High School in Garden Grove, California. He played four seasons in the minors and had a record of 30-21 and a 3.67 ERA in 19 games (17 starts) before he was released. This years draft class was so bad that only four players in the top 20 picks even reached AAA.

The only player that made the Majors for more than a cameo appearance was Edwin Jackson, selected in the sixth round as an outfielder out of Shaw High School in Columbus, Georgia. He was converted to a pitcher and made it to the Majors in 2003 with the Dodgers and was then traded in 2006. He was a 2009 All-Star with the Detroit Tigers and also pitched a no-hitter in 2010 while a member of the Arizona Diamondbacks.

2001 draft picks

Round	Name	Position	School	Signed	Career span	Highest level
2	Billy Pilkington	RHP	Santiago High School	Yes	2001–2005	AA
3	David Taylor	RHP	South Lake High School	Yes	2001	Rookie
4	Kole Strayhorn	RHP	Shawnee High School	Yes	2002–2006	AA
5	Steve Nelson	RHP	Cole Harbour District High School	Yes	2001–2005	A+
6	Edwin Jackson	OF	Shaw High School	Yes	2001–2021	**MLB**
7	David Cuen	LHP	Cibola High School	Yes	2001–2005	A
8	Dave Cardona	OF	Colegio San José High School	Yes	2001–2010	A+
9	Sean Pierce	OF	San Diego State University	Yes	2002–2003	A+
10	Thom Ott	RHP	University of Nebraska at Lincoln	Yes	2001–2003	A
11	Luis Gonzalez	LHP	Florida Air Academy High School	Yes	2001–2011	**NPB**
12	Cedric Benson	OF	Robert E. Lee High School	Yes	2001–2002	Rookie
13	Matt Kauffman	LHP	San Jose State University	Yes	2001–2002	Rookie
14	Ryan Carter	OF	Riverdale High School	Yes	2001–2006	A+
15	James Stewart	RHP	Sabino High School	Yes	2001–2003	A+
16	Josh Canales	SS	University of California, Los Angeles	Yes	2001–2003	AAA
17	Michael Johnson	OF	University of Arkansas	Yes	2001	Rookie
18	Vance McCracken	RHP	West Virginia University	Yes	2001–2003	A+
19	John Urick	1B	Cowley County Community College	No; Yankees-2003	2003–2010	AAA
20	Billy Malone	2B	Robert Morris College	Yes	2001–2007	Rookie
21	Jereme Milons	OF	Starkville High School	Yes	2002–2013	A+
22	Scott Gillitzer	2B	University of Wisconsin at Madison	Yes	2001–2004	A+
23	James Dykes	LHP	Parklane Academy High School	No		
24	Ryan Lennerton	LHP	Brookswood Secondary School	No		
25	Garrett Murdy	RHP	Mission Viejo High School	No; Astros-2004	2004–2008	A
26	Jay Sadlowe	RHP	Farragut High School	No		
27	Christopher Hutcheson	LHP	Florala High School	No		
28	Kyle Crist	RHP	Granite Bay High School	No; Royals-2004	2004–2009	AA
29	Dennis Bigley	1B	Dallas Christian High School	No; Blue Jays-2005	2005–2006	A-
30	Thomas Wilson	LHP	Central Cabarrus High School	No; Expos-2004	2004–2007	A+
31	David Parker	RHP	Sisler High School	No; Dodgers-2002	2002–2005	Rookie
32	Michael Hollimon	SS	Dallas Jesuit College Prep	No; Tigers-2005	2005–2012	**MLB**
33	Jason Stefai	LHP	Albertson College	Yes	2001–2004	A+
34	Brian Devereaux	RHP	Hollywood Christian High School	No		
35	Christopher Casey	LHP	Huntsville High School	No		
36	Brain Cleveland	SS	San Jose City College	No; Marlins-2004	2004–2006	AA
37	Dustin Schroer	OF		No		
38	Ryan Hamilton	SS	Klein High School	No		
39	William Johnson	1B	North Springs High School	No		
40	Cameron Feightner	RHP	Beaverton High School	No		
41	Jim Gregory	LHP	Crockett High School	No		
42	Jordan Kissock	OF	Delphi Academy	No		
43	Clint Sammons	C	Parkview High School	No; Braves-2004	2004–2012	**MLB**
44	Clay Wehner	C	Thomasville High School	No		
45	Mike Rodriguez	RHP	Sierra College	Yes	2002–2006	A+
46	Mike Lynch	C	South Suburban College	Yes	2002–2006	Rookie
47	Devin Monds	RHP	Nepean High School	No		
48	Daniel Desclouds	RHP	Connors State College	No		
49	Jason Schuler	C	College of Lake County	No		
50	Brooks Bollinger	3B	University of Wisconsin at Madison	No		
