= 2001 Pittsburgh Pirates season =

2001 Pittsburgh Pirates
- League: National League
- Division: Central
- Ballpark: PNC Park
- City: Pittsburgh, Pennsylvania
- Record: 62–100 (.383)
- Divisional place: 6th
- Owners: Kevin McClatchy
- General managers: Cam Bonifay; Roy Smith (interim); Dave Littlefield
- Managers: Lloyd McClendon
- Television: WCWB-TV; Fox Sports Net Pittsburgh
- Radio: KDKA-AM (Steve Blass, Greg Brown, Lanny Frattare, Bob Walk)

The 2001 Pittsburgh Pirates season was the 120th season of the franchise; the 115th in the National League. This was their first season at PNC Park. The Pirates finished sixth and last in the National League Central with a record of 62–100, their first 100 loss season since 1985. The year also saw longtime Pirate Bill Mazeroski inducted into the Hall of Fame.

== Offseason ==
- February 1, 2001: Billy Taylor was signed as a free agent with the Pittsburgh Pirates.

== Regular season ==
=== Season standings ===
NL Central
Team	W	L	Pct.	GB	Home	Road
Houston Astros	93	69	.574	—	44‍–‍37	49‍–‍32
St. Louis Cardinals	93	69	.574	—	54‍–‍28	39‍–‍41
Chicago Cubs	88	74	.543	5	48‍–‍33	40‍–‍41
Milwaukee Brewers	68	94	.420	25	36‍–‍45	32‍–‍49
Cincinnati Reds	66	96	.407	27	27‍–‍54	39‍–‍42
Pittsburgh Pirates	62	100	.383	31	38‍–‍43	24‍–‍57

=== Game log ===
2001 Game Log (62–100)
April (9–14)

#	Date	Opponent	Score	Win	Loss	Save	Attendance	Record
1	April 3	@ Cincinnati	2–3	Fernandez	**Ritchie**	Graves	20,784	0–1
2	April 4	@ Cincinnati	6–5 (10)	**Williams**	Sullivan	—	18,330	1–1
3	April 5	@ Cincinnati	1–4	Dessens	**Anderson**	Riedling	20,482	1–2
4	April 6	@ Houston	1–4	Dotel	**Olivares**	Wagner	27,126	1–3
5	April 7	@ Houston	5–3	**Arroyo**	Bottenfield	**Williams**	30,046	2–3
6	April 8	@ Houston	9–3	**Beimel**	Elarton	—	30,174	3–3
7	April 9	Cincinnati	2–8	Reitsma	**Ritchie**	—	36,954	3–4
8	April 11	Cincinnati	6–5	**Silva**	Riedling	**Williams**	35,045	4–4
9	April 12	Cincinnati	6–11	Harnisch	**Olivares**	—	33,045	4–5
10	April 13	@ Chicago	2–4	Bere	**Arroyo**	Fassero	26,003	4–6
11	April 14	@ Chicago	6–7	Aybar	**Silva**	Fassero	34,220	4–7
12	April 15	@ Chicago	1–5	Duncan	**Sauerbeck**	—	21,061	4–8
13	April 16	Houston	3–0	**Anderson**	Miller	**Williams**	20,128	5–8
14	April 18	Houston	8–4	**Arroyo**	Reynolds	—	20,339	6–8
15	April 20	Chicago	2–8	Lieber	**Martinez**	—	31,692	6–9
16	April 21	Chicago	3–4	Heredia	**Williams**	Fassero	33,105	6–10
17	April 22	Chicago	4–3 (10)	**Williams**	Fassero	—	35,676	7–10
18	April 24	@ Los Angeles	5–1	**Olivares**	Park	—	23,596	8–10
19	April 25	@ Los Angeles	5–6	Adams	**Manzanillo**	—	22,495	8–11
20	April 26	@ Los Angeles	3–6	Brown	**Ritchie**	—	24,143	8–12
21	April 27	@ San Diego	3–0	**Anderson**	Jones	**Williams**	27,896	9–12
22	April 28	@ San Diego	1–8	Eaton	**Arroyo**	—	48,326	9–13
23	April 29	@ San Diego	1–6	Williams	**Olivares**	Hoffman	41,654	9–14

May (8–20)

#	Date	Opponent	Score	Win	Loss	Save	Attendance	Record
24	May 1	San Francisco	6–11	Rueter	**Martinez**	—	22,926	9–15
25	May 2	San Francisco	6–7	Ortiz	**Silva**	Nen	22,880	9–16
26	May 3	San Francisco	4–3	**Silva**	Estes	**Williams**	23,048	10–16
27	May 4	Colorado	3–9	Hampton	**Arroyo**	—	32,653	10–17
28	May 5	Colorado	11–3	**Olivares**	Chacon	—	37,596	11–17
29	May 6	Colorado	4–3 (11)	**Beimel**	White	—	34,915	12–17
30	May 7	@ St. Louis	0–7	Morris	**Ritchie**	—	31,891	12–18
31	May 8	@ St. Louis	2–8	Benes	**Anderson**	—	35,771	12–19
32	May 9	@ St. Louis	2–6	Hermanson	**Arroyo**	—	33,921	12–20
33	May 10	@ St. Louis	5–11	Matthews	**Silva**	—	45,008	12–21
34	May 11	@ Milwaukee	3–0	**Schmidt**	Haynes	**Williams**	31,525	13–21
35	May 12	@ Milwaukee	4–5 (12)	Leskanic	**Beimel**	—	42,004	13–22
36	May 13	@ Milwaukee	1–4	Sheets	**Anderson**	—	30,084	13–23
37	May 14	@ Milwaukee	8–11	Wright	**Wengert**	Leskanic	26,974	13–24
38	May 15	St. Louis	3–8	Hermanson	**Olivares**	—	30,883	13–25
39	May 16	St. Louis	0–3	Kile	**Schmidt**	—	29,128	13–26
40	May 17	St. Louis	2–12	Morris	**Ritchie**	—	29,835	13–27
41	May 19	Milwaukee	6–1	**Anderson**	Sheets	—	37,857	14–27
42	May 20	Milwaukee	8–7	**Manzanillo**	Weathers	**Williams**	35,728	15–27
43	May 23	@ Philadelphia	0–4	Wolf	**Schmidt**	Bottalico	—	15–28
44	May 23	@ Philadelphia	2–5	Daal	**Olivares**	Mesa	13,337	15–29
45	May 24	@ Philadelphia	5–6	Cormier	**Sauerbeck**	Mesa	12,287	15–30
46	May 25	@ Atlanta	0–1	Maddux	**Ritchie**	—	28,120	15–31
47	May 26	@ Atlanta	3–9	Burkett	**Wengert**	—	40,788	15–32
48	May 27	@ Atlanta	6–3	**Arroyo**	Glavine	**Williams**	35,728	16–32
49	May 28	Florida	8–5	**Silva**	Miceli	**Williams**	26,512	17–32
50	May 29	Florida	0–5	Burnett	**Anderson**	—	21,083	17–33
51	May 30	Florida	7–9 (10)	Alfonseca	**Williams**	Looper	24,343	17–34

June (12–15)

#	Date	Opponent	Score	Win	Loss	Save	Attendance	Record
52	June 1	Atlanta	1–5	Burkett	**Ritchie**	—	34,230	17–35
53	June 3	Atlanta	7–11	Glavine	**Olivares**	—	—	17–36
54	June 3	Atlanta	3–8	Smoltz	**Anderson**	—	36,924	17–37
55	June 5	@ Florida	5–2	**Schmidt**	Penny	**Williams**	10,138	18–37
56	June 6	@ Florida	2–7	Dempster	**Ritchie**	—	10,114	18–38
57	June 7	@ Florida	3–5	Bones	**Manzanillo**	Alfonseca	14,516	18–39
58	June 8	@ Minnesota	6–8	Carrasco	**Olivares**	Hawkins	29,587	18–40
59	June 9	@ Minnesota	2–3	Mays	**Anderson**	Hawkins	26,685	18–41
60	June 10	@ Minnesota	11–8	**Sauerbeck**	Miller	**Williams**	24,400	19–41
61	June 12	@ Detroit	13–3	**Ritchie**	Mlicki	—	15,919	20–41
62	June 13	@ Detroit	3–6	Weaver	**Beimel**	Anderson	17,639	20–42
63	June 14	@ Detroit	4–6	Sparks	**Arroyo**	Anderson	17,305	20–43
64	June 15	Cleveland	6–3	**Anderson**	Burba	**Williams**	36,235	21–43
65	June 16	Cleveland	6–4	**Schmidt**	Wright	**Williams**	37,056	22–43
66	June 17	Cleveland	1–0	**Ritchie**	Karsay	—	36,694	23–43
67	June 19	Philadelphia	8–5	**Beimel**	Chen	**Sauerbeck**	33,713	24–43
68	June 20	Philadelphia	5–9	Daal	**Arroyo**	—	28,145	24–44
69	June 21	Philadelphia	3–6	Person	**Anderson**	Mesa	29,560	24–45
70	June 22	Montréal	5–11	Armas	**Schmidt**	—	33,439	24–46
71	June 23	Montréal	7–4	**Ritchie**	Yoshii	**Williams**	38,169	25–46
72	June 24	Montréal	4–11	Mattes	**Beimel**	—	36,826	25–47
73	June 25	Milwaukee	6–4	**Williams**	Levrault	**Williams**	22,470	26–47
74	June 26	Milwaukee	7–6 (12)	**Olivares**	King	—	24,120	27–47
75	June 27	Milwaukee	6–2	**Schmidt**	Haynes	—	25,756	28–47
76	June 28	Milwaukee	1–0	**Ritchie**	Wright	**Williams**	36,390	29–47
77	June 29	@ Montréal	3–12	Mattes	**Beimel**	—	6,504	29–48
78	June 30	@ Montréal	6–7	Lloyd	**Williams**	—	8,711	29–49

July (12–15)

#	Date	Opponent	Score	Win	Loss	Save	Attendance	Record
79	July 1	@ Montréal	3–9	Thurman	**Anderson**	—	6,631	29–50
80	July 2	@ Cincinnati	10–5	**Schmidt**	Davis	—	22,397	30–50
81	July 3	@ Cincinnati	3–2	**Ritchie**	Dessens	**Williams**	21,724	31–50
82	July 4	@ Cincinnati	14–3	**Beimel**	Reith	—	17,972	32–50
83	July 5	@ Cincinnati	1–7	Acevedo	**Williams**	—	24,128	32–51
84	July 6	@ Chicago	10–6	**Manzanillo**	Howry	—	19,554	33–51
85	July 7	@ Chicago	1–4	Wells	**Schmidt**	Foulke	25,113	33–52
86	July 8	@ Chicago	2–9	Lowe	**Ritchie**	—	22,105	33–53
87	July 12	Kansas City	2–0	**Anderson**	Suppan	**Williams**	26,393	34–53
88	July 13	Kansas City	1–0	**Ritchie**	Grimsley	—	35,325	35–53
89	July 14	Kansas City	4–7	Wilson	**Williams**	Hernandez	37,789	35–54
90	July 15	Los Angeles	2–4	Brown	**Schmidt**	Shaw	38,152	35–55
91	July 16	Los Angeles	4–6	Gagne	**Beimel**	Shaw	26,145	35–56
92	July 17	Los Angeles	1–4	Adams	**Anderson**	Herges	30,150	35–57
93	July 18	Chicago	5–6	Fassero	**Williams**	Gordon	31,919	35–58
94	July 19	Chicago	3–2	**Olivares**	Duncan	**Williams**	34,921	36–58
95	July 20	@ St. Louis	4–1	**Schmidt**	Hermanson	**Manzanillo**	35,215	37–58
96	July 21	@ St. Louis	2–9	Smith	**Beimel**	—	44,930	37–59
97	July 22	@ St. Louis	2–0	**Anderson**	Timlin	**Williams**	33,546	38–59
98	July 24	@ Chicago	2–10	Tavarez	**Ritchie**	—	40,269	38–60
99	July 25	@ Chicago	5–6	Lieber	**Williams**	—	38,508	38–61
100	July 26	Houston	2–3	Mlicki	**Schmidt**	Wagner	30,245	38–62
101	July 27	Houston	3–2	**Beimel**	Reynolds	**Williams**	38,463	39–62
102	July 28	Houston	9–8	**Olivares**	Wagner	—	32,977	40–62
103	July 28	Houston	3–12	McKnight	**Anderson**	—	38,295	40–63
104	July 29	Houston	4–1	**Ritchie**	Miller	**Williams**	37,166	41–63
105	July 31	@ San Francisco	7–8 (11)	Gomes	**Wilkins**	—	41,529	41–64

August (8–20)

#	Date	Opponent	Score	Win	Loss	Save	Attendance	Record
106	August 1	@ San Francisco	1–3	Schmidt	**Beimel**	Nen	41,251	41–65
107	August 2	@ San Francisco	0–3	Rueter	**McKnight**	Nen	41,726	41–66
108	August 3	@ Colorado	7–12	Hampton	**Anderson**	—	38,836	41–67
109	August 4	@ Colorado	6–3	**Ritchie**	Chacon	—	44,294	42–67
110	August 5	@ Colorado	5–4	**Lincoln**	Bohanon	**Fetters**	36,570	43–67
111	August 7	Los Angeles	1–2	Adams	**McKnight**	Shaw	28,873	43–68
112	August 8	Los Angeles	4–9	Carrara	**Anderson**	—	29,528	43–69
113	August 9	Los Angeles	8–5	**Ritchie**	Park	**Fetters**	29,841	44–69
114	August 10	San Diego	2–3	Tollberg	**Williams**	Hoffman	36,588	44–70
115	August 11	San Diego	2–6	Lawrence	**Beimel**	—	39,388	44–71
116	August 12	San Diego	7–6	**Manzanillo**	Myers	—	37,150	45–71
117	August 13	@ Arizona	0–3	Johnson	**Anderson**	—	32,386	45–72
118	August 14	@ Arizona	3–4 (10)	Batista	**Marte**	—	31,006	45–73
119	August 15	@ Arizona	2–5	Schilling	**Williams**	—	28,703	45–74
120	August 16	@ Houston	3–4	Miller	**Beimel**	Wagner	26,518	45–75
121	August 17	@ Houston	5–6	Mlicki	**McKnight**	Wagner	37,363	45–76
122	August 18	@ Houston	0–3	Hernandez	**Anderson**	Dotel	41,955	45–77
123	August 19	@ Houston	2–12	Oswalt	**Ritchie**	—	35,915	45–78
124	August 21	Arizona	4–2	**Olivares**	Schilling	**Fetters**	35,131	46–78
125	August 22	Arizona	0–6	Lopez	**Beimel**	—	26,531	46–79
126	August 23	Arizona	5–1	**McKnight**	Johnson	**Fetters**	30,794	47–79
127	August 24	Houston	1–5	Oswalt	**Anderson**	—	37,324	47–80
128	August 25	Houston	8–2	**Ritchie**	Mlicki	—	37,665	48–80
129	August 26	Houston	1–3	Villone	**Williams**	Wagner	34,850	48–81
130	August 27	@ Milwaukee	5–12	Coppinger	**Beimel**	Buddie	26,289	48–82
131	August 28	@ Milwaukee	6–5	**Sauerbeck**	Leskanic	**Fetters**	23,579	49–82
132	August 29	@ Milwaukee	8–9	Levrault	**Anderson**	Fox	24,551	49–83
133	August 31	@ Cincinnati	3–11	Reitsma	**Ritchie**	—	19,090	49–84

September (9–14)

#	Date	Opponent	Score	Win	Loss	Save	Attendance	Record
134	September 1	@ Cincinnati	7–0	**Williams**	Acevedo	—	24,308	50–84
135	September 2	@ Cincinnati	6–8	Sullivan	**Lincoln**	Graves	21,881	50–85
136	September 3	Milwaukee	7–12	Leiter	**Vogelsong**	—	—	50–86
137	September 3	Milwaukee	3–2	**Fetters**	Fox	—	29,003	51–86
138	September 4	Milwaukee	5–2	**Arroyo**	Levrault	**Fetters**	17,293	52–86
139	September 5	Milwaukee	5–1	**Ritchie**	Wright	—	18,866	53–86
140	September 6	Cincinnati	6–8	Brower	**Loiselle**	Graves	20,683	53–87
141	September 7	Cincinnati	3–1	**McKnight**	Davis	**Olivares**	33,800	54–87
142	September 8	Cincinnati	5–2	**Anderson**	Dessens	—	38,638	55–87
143	September 9	Cincinnati	3–5	Reyes	**Vogelsong**	Graves	33,214	55–88
144	September 17	New York	1–4	Franco	**Fetters**	Benitez	25,902	55–89
145	September 18	New York	5–7	Riggan	**Olivares**	Benitez	19,285	55–90
146	September 19	New York	2–9	Gonzalez	**McKnight**	—	20,371	55–91
147	September 20	St. Louis	1–9	Williams	**Anderson**	—	21,678	55–92
148	September 21	St. Louis	5–9	Hackman	**Olivares**	—	36,209	55–93
149	September 22	St. Louis	1–4	Smith	**Ritchie**	Stechschulte	37,539	55–94
150	September 23	St. Louis	2–1	**Williams**	Hermanson	**Manzanillo**	33,633	56–94
151	September 24	Chicago	7–6	**Lincoln**	Chiasson	**Loiselle**	18,908	57–94
152	September 25	Chicago	13–1	**Anderson**	Bere	—	18,581	58–94
153	September 26	Chicago	4–8	Cruz	**Arroyo**	—	25,564	58–95
154	September 28	@ St. Louis	3–14	Hermanson	**Ritchie**	—	33,218	58–96
155	September 29	@ St. Louis	0–2	Morris	**Williams**	Stechschulte	39,782	58–97
156	September 30	@ St. Louis	3–7	Williams	**McKnight**	—	42,442	58–98

October (4–2)

#	Date	Opponent	Score	Win	Loss	Save	Attendance	Record
157	October 1	@ New York	5–1	**Anderson**	Rusch	**Sauerbeck**	6,315	59–98
158	October 2	@ New York	10–1	**Arroyo**	Chen	—	8,058	60–98
159	October 3	@ New York	0–3	Trachsel	**Ritchie**	—	6,627	60–99
160	October 5	@ Chicago	3–2	**Beimel**	Bere	**Fetters**	24,786	61–99
161	October 6	@ Chicago	2–13	Tavarez	**McKnight**	—	35,020	61–100
162	October 7	@ Chicago	4–3	**Beimel**	Zambrano	**Fetters**	35,083	62–100

Legend: = Win = Loss
Bold = Pirates team member

=== Record vs. opponents ===
2001 National League record Source: MLB Standings Grid – 2001
Team	AZ	ATL	CHC	CIN	COL	FLA	HOU	LAD	MIL	MON	NYM	PHI	PIT	SD	SF	STL	AL
Arizona	—	5–2	6–3	5–1	13–6	4–2	2–4	10–9	3–3	3–3	3–3	3–4	4–2	12–7	10–9	2–4	7–8
Atlanta	2–5	—	4–2	4–2	4–2	9–10	3–3	2–5	3–3	13–6	10–9	10–9	5–1	3–3	4–2	3–3	9–9
Chicago	3–6	2–4	—	13–4	3–3	3–3	8–9	4–2	8–9	3–3	4–2	4–2	10–6	2–4	3–3	9–8	9–6
Cincinnati	1–5	2–4	4–13	—	3–6	4–2	6–11	4–2	6–10	4–2	4–2	2–4	9–8	2–4	4–2	7–10	4–11
Colorado	6–13	2–4	3–3	6–3	—	4–2	2–4	8–11	5–1	3–4	4–3	2–4	2–4	9–10	9–10	6–3	2–10
Florida	2–4	10–9	3–3	2–4	2–4	—	3–3	2–5	4–2	12–7	7–12	5–14	4–2	3–4	2–4	3–3	12–6
Houston	4–2	3–3	9–8	11–6	4–2	3–3	—	2–4	12–5	6–0	3–3	3–3	9–8	3–6	3–3	9–7	9–6
Los Angeles	9–10	5–2	2–4	2–4	11–8	5–2	4–2	—	5–1	2–4	2–4	3–3	7–2	9–10	11–8	3–3	6–9
Milwaukee	3–3	3–3	9–8	10–6	1–5	2–4	5–12	1–5	—	4–2	3–3	3–3	6–11	1–5	5–4	7–10	5–10
Montreal	3–3	6–13	3–3	2–4	4–3	7–12	0–6	4–2	2–4	—	8–11	9–10	5–1	3–3	2–5	2–4	8–10
New York	3–3	9–10	2–4	2–4	3–4	12–7	3–3	4–2	3–3	11–8	—	11–8	4–2	1–5	3–4	1–5	10–8
Philadelphia	4–3	9–10	2–4	4–2	4–2	14–5	3–3	3–3	3–3	10–9	8–11	—	5–1	5–2	3–3	2–4	7–11
Pittsburgh	2–4	1–5	6–10	8–9	4–2	2–4	8–9	2–7	11–6	1–5	2–4	1–5	—	2–4	1–5	3–14	8–7
San Diego	7–12	3–3	4–2	4–2	10–9	4–3	6–3	10–9	5–1	3–3	5–1	2–5	4–2	—	5–14	1–5	6–9
San Francisco	9–10	2–4	3–3	2–4	10–9	4–2	3–3	8–11	4–5	5–2	4–3	3–3	5–1	14–5	—	4–2	10–5
St. Louis	4–2	3–3	8–9	10–7	3–6	3–3	7–9	3–3	10–7	4–2	5–1	4–2	14–3	5–1	2–4	—	8–7

=== Detailed records ===
National League
Opponent	W	L	WP	RS	RA
NL East
Atlanta Braves	1	5	0.167	20	37
Florida Marlins	2	4	0.333	25	33
Montreal Expos	1	5	0.167	28	54
New York Mets	2	4	0.333	23	25
Philadelphia Phillies	1	5	0.167	23	35
Total	7	23	0.233	119	184
NL Central
Chicago Cubs	6	10	0.375	66	88
Cincinnati Reds	8	9	0.471	84	88
Houston Astros	8	9	0.471	67	75
Milwaukee Brewers	11	6	0.647	89	83
**Pittsburgh Pirates**					
St. Louis Cardinals	3	14	0.176	37	111
Total	36	48	0.429	343	445
NL West
Arizona Diamondbacks	2	4	0.333	14	21
Colorado Rockies	4	2	0.667	36	34
Los Angeles Dodgers	2	7	0.222	33	43
San Diego Padres	2	4	0.333	16	29
San Francisco Giants	1	5	0.167	24	35
Total	11	22	0.333	123	162
American League
Chicago White Sox	1	2	0.333	13	19
Cleveland Indians	3	0	1.000	13	7
Detroit Tigers	1	2	0.333	20	15
Kansas City Royals	2	1	0.667	7	7
Minnesota Twins	1	2	0.333	19	19
Total	8	7	0.533	72	67
Season Total	62	100	0.383	657	858

Month	Games	Won	Lost	Win %	RS	RA
April	23	9	14	0.391	85	108
May	28	8	20	0.286	109	166
June	27	12	15	0.444	134	156
July	27	12	15	0.444	109	134
August	28	8	20	0.286	99	149
September	23	9	14	0.391	97	122
October	6	4	2	0.667	24	23
Total	162	62	100	0.383	657	858

	Games	Won	Lost	Win %	RS	RA
Home	81	38	43	0.469	342	414
Away	81	24	57	0.296	315	444
Total	162	62	100	0.383	657	858

== Roster ==
2001 Pittsburgh Pirates
Roster
Pitchers: 55 Jimmy Anderson; 69 Bronson Arroyo; 53 Joe Beimel; 39 Mike Fetters; 57 Mike Lincoln; 51 Rich Loiselle; 49 Josías Manzanillo; 46 Dámaso Marte; 38 Ramón Martínez; 45 Tony McKnight; 45 Terry Mulholland; 31 Omar Olivares; 48 Todd Ritchie; 47 Scott Sauerbeck; 22 Jason Schmidt; 56 José Silva; 36 Billy Taylor; 28 Ryan Vogelsong; 38 Don Wengert; 50 Marc Wilkins; 58 Dave Williams; 43 Mike Williams	Catchers: 11 Humberto Cota; 18 Jason Kendall; 15 Keith Osik; Infielders: 25 Luis Figueroa; 25 Mendy López; 2 Pat Meares; 30 Warren Morris; 10 Abraham Núñez; 16 Aramis Ramírez; 7 John Wehner; 36 Craig Wilson; 25 Enrique Wilson; 12 Jack Wilson; 29 Kevin Young	Outfielders: 50 Andy Barkett; 14 Derek Bell; 13 Adrian Brown; 17 Emil Brown; 24 Brian Giles; 3 Chad Hermansen; 27 Alex Hernández; 38 Adam Hyzdu; 59 Rob Mackowiak; 22 Gary Matthews, Jr.; 5 Tike Redman; 17 Armando Ríos; 28 John Vander Wal	Manager: 23 Lloyd McClendon; Coaches: 35 Dave Clark (hitting); 44 Trent Jewett (third base); 37 Tommy Sandt (first base); 52 Bruce Tanner (bullpen); 19 Bill Virdon (bench); 54 Spin Williams (pitching)

=== Opening Day lineup ===
Opening Day Starters
Name	Position
Adrian Brown	CF
Derek Bell	RF
Jason Kendall	C
Brian Giles	LF
Aramis Ramírez	3B
Kevin Young	1B
Pat Meares	2B
Jack Wilson	SS
Todd Ritchie	SP

=== Notable transactions ===
- April 2, 2001: Billy Taylor was released by the Pittsburgh Pirates.
- April 3, 2001: Billy Taylor was signed as a free agent with the Pittsburgh Pirates.
- April 11, 2001: Ramón Martínez was signed as a free agent with the Pittsburgh Pirates.
- June 5, 2001: Jeremy Guthrie was drafted by the Pittsburgh Pirates in the 3rd round of the 2001 amateur draft, but did not sign.
- July 30, 2001: John Vander Wal and Jason Schmidt were traded by the Pittsburgh Pirates to the San Francisco Giants for Armando Ríos and Ryan Vogelsong.

== PNC Park ==
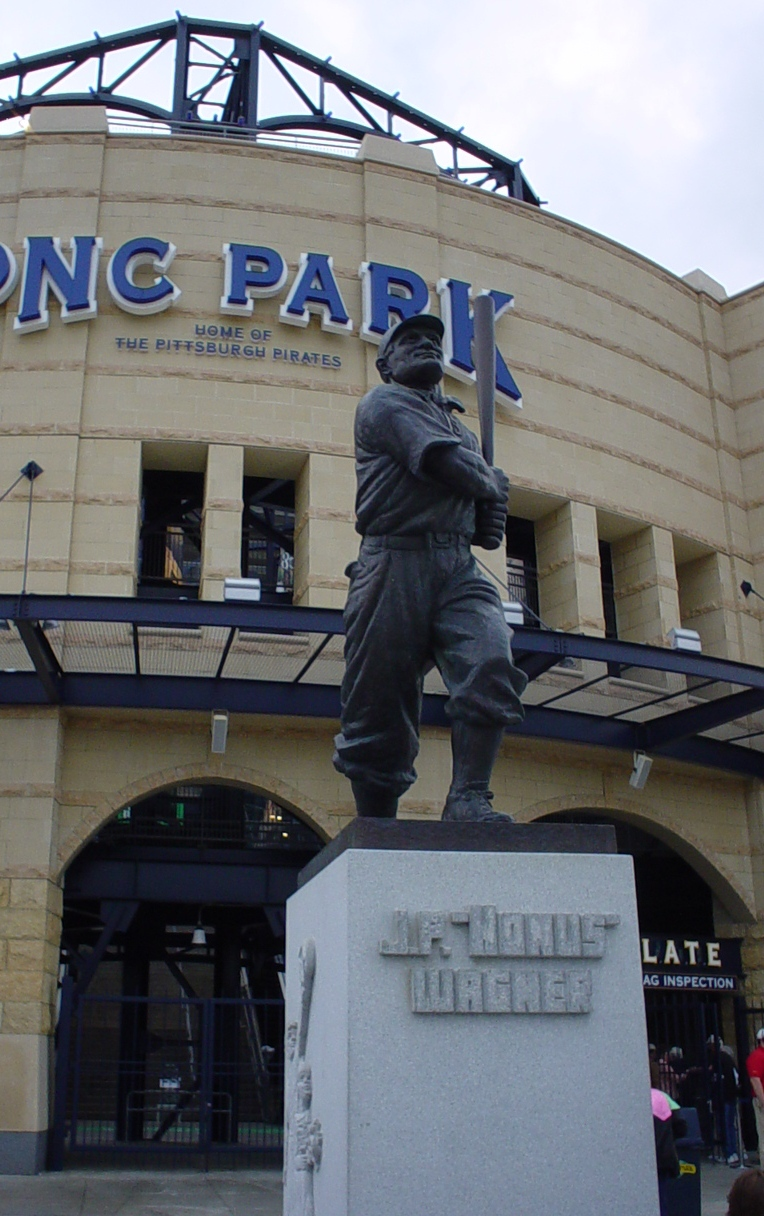
J. P. "Honus" Wagner, a statue of Honus Wagner by Frank Vittor, outside the homeplate entrance

The Pirates opened the park with two pre-season games against the New York Mets, the first was played on March 31, 2001. The first official baseball game played in PNC Park was between the Cincinnati Reds and the Pittsburgh Pirates, on April 9, 2001. The Reds won the game by the final score of 8–2. The first pitch was thrown by Todd Ritchie, a ball to Barry Larkin. In the top of the first inning, Sean Casey's two-run home run was the first hit in the park. The first Pirates' batter, Adrian Brown, struck out; however, later in the inning Jason Kendall singled, the first hit by a Pirate. Two days later, John Vander Wal became the first Pirate to hit a home run in the park.

Upon opening in 2001, PNC Park was praised by fans and media alike. Jim Caple, of ESPN.com, ranked PNC Park as the best stadium in Major League Baseball, with a score of 95 out of 100. He compared the park to Fallingwater, calling the stadium itself "perfect", and citing the high ticket prices as the only negative aspect of visiting the park. Pirates' vice-president Steve Greenberg said, "We said when construction began that we would build the best ballpark in baseball, and we believe we've done that." Major League Baseball executive Paul Beeston has said the park was the best he's seen so far in baseball. Many of the workers who built the park said that it was the nicest that they have seen. In 2008, Men's Fitness named the park one of "10 big league parks worth seeing this summer".

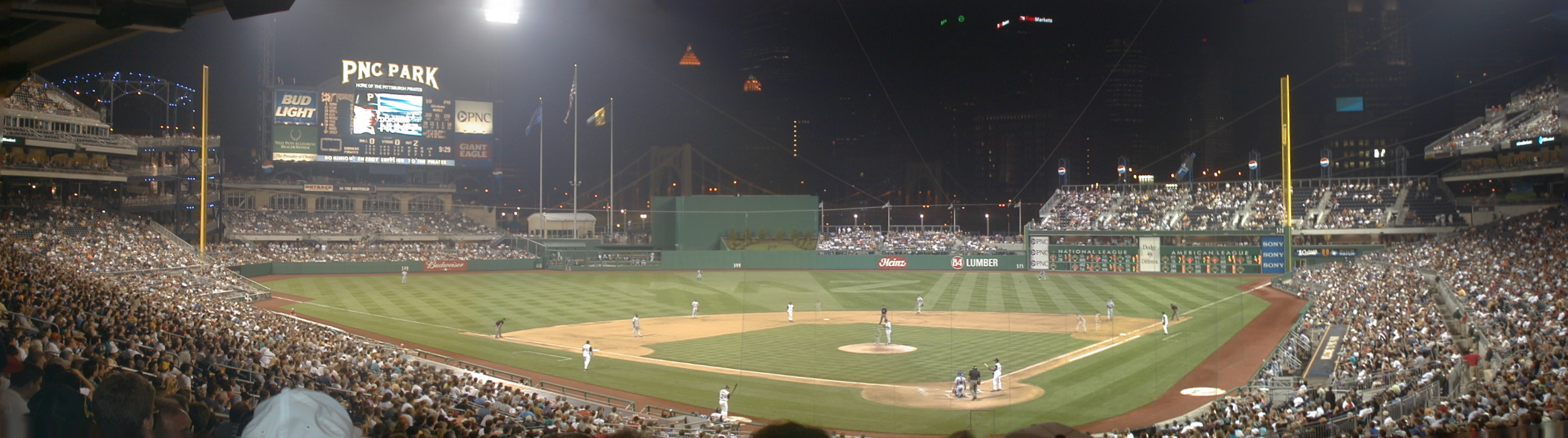
An evening game between the Dodgers and Pirates – August 7, 2001

== Awards and honors ==
2001 Major League Baseball All-Star Game

- Brian Giles, OF, reserve

== Statistics ==
Hitting

Note: G = Games played; AB = At bats; H = Hits; Avg. = Batting average; HR = Home runs; RBI = Runs batted in

Regular season
Player	G	AB	H	Avg.	HR	RBI
A. Ríos	2	3	1	0.333	0	1
C. Wilson	88	158	49	0.310	13	32
B. Giles	160	576	178	0.309	37	95
A. Barkett	17	46	14	0.304	1	3
A. Ramírez	158	603	181	0.300	34	112
J. Vander Wal	97	313	87	0.278	11	50
J. Beimel	41	26	7	0.269	0	0
R. Mackowiak	83	214	57	0.266	4	21
J. Kendall	157	606	161	0.266	10	53
A. Núñez	115	301	79	0.262	1	21
M. Lincoln	30	4	1	0.250	0	0
G. Matthews, Jr.	46	147	36	0.245	5	14
M. López	22	43	10	0.233	0	4
K. Young	142	449	104	0.232	14	65
T. Redman	37	125	28	0.224	1	4
J. Wilson	108	390	87	0.223	3	25
H. Cota	7	9	2	0.222	0	1
O. Olivares	44	27	6	0.222	1	6
P. Meares	87	270	57	0.211	4	25
A. Hyzdu	51	72	15	0.208	5	9
K. Osik	56	120	25	0.208	2	13
W. Morris	48	103	21	0.204	2	11
E. Brown	61	123	25	0.203	3	13
J. Wehner	43	51	10	0.196	0	2
A. Brown	8	31	6	0.194	1	2
E. Wilson	46	129	24	0.186	1	8
J. Schmidt	12	23	4	0.174	1	1
D. Bell	46	156	27	0.173	5	13
C. Hermansen	22	55	9	0.164	2	5
T. Ritchie	32	59	9	0.153	0	3
J. Anderson	32	59	7	0.119	0	3
D. Williams	20	34	4	0.118	0	2
A. Hernández	7	11	1	0.091	0	0
B. Arroyo	23	21	1	0.048	0	1
L. Figueroa	4	2	0	0.000	0	0
J. Manzanillo	68	1	0	0.000	0	0
D. Marte	23	4	0	0.000	0	0
R. Martínez	4	5	0	0.000	0	0
T. McKnight	12	17	0	0.000	0	0
T. Mulholland	21	3	0	0.000	0	0
S. Sauerbeck	66	2	0	0.000	0	0
J. Silva	26	2	0	0.000	0	0
R. Vogelsong	2	2	0	0.000	0	0
D. Wengert	4	3	0	0.000	0	0
M. Fetters	20	0	0	—	0	0
R. Loiselle	17	0	0	—	0	0
B. Taylor	1	0	0	—	0	0
M. Wilkins	14	0	0	—	0	0
M. Williams	38	0	0	—	0	0
Team totals	162	5,398	1,333	0.247	161	618

Pitching

Note: G = Games pitched; IP = Innings pitched; W = Wins; L = Losses; ERA = Earned run average; SO = Strikeouts

Regular season
Player	G	IP	W	L	ERA	SO
M. Lincoln	31	40 1/3	2	1	2.68	24
J. Manzanillo	71	79 2/3	3	2	3.39	80
M. Williams	40	41 2/3	2	4	3.67	43
D. Williams	22	114	3	7	3.71	57
T. Mulholland	22	36 1/3	0	0	3.72	17
T. Ritchie	33	207 1/3	11	15	4.47	124
B. Taylor	1	2	0	0	4.50	3
M. Fetters	20	17 2/3	1	1	4.58	11
J. Schmidt	14	84	6	6	4.61	77
D. Marte	23	36 1/3	0	1	4.71	39
B. Arroyo	24	88 1/3	5	7	5.09	39
J. Anderson	34	206 1/3	9	17	5.10	89
T. McKnight	12	69 1/3	2	6	5.19	36
J. Beimel	42	115 1/3	7	11	5.23	58
S. Sauerbeck	70	62 2/3	2	2	5.60	79
O. Olivares	45	110	6	9	6.55	69
J. Silva	26	32	3	3	6.75	23
M. Wilkins	14	17 1/3	0	1	6.75	11
R. Martínez	4	15 2/3	0	2	8.62	9
R. Loiselle	18	18	0	1	11.50	9
R. Vogelsong	2	6	0	2	12.00	7
D. Wengert	4	16	0	2	12.38	4
Team totals	162	1,416 1/3	62	100	5.05	908

== Draft picks ==
2001 Top 10 Rounds Draft Picks
Rd	#	Player	Pos	DOB and Age	School
1	8	John Van Benschoten	RHP	April 14, 1980 (aged 21)	Kent State University (Kent, Ohio)
3	84	Jeremy Guthrie	RHP	April 8, 1979 (aged 22)	Stanford University (Palo Alto, California)
4	114	Jeff Keppinger	SS	April 21, 1980 (aged 21)	University of Georgia (Athens, Georgia)
5	144	Travis Chapman	1B	June 5, 1978 (aged 23)	Indian River Community College (Fort Pierce, Florida)
6	174	Drew Friedberg	LHP	March 3, 1979 (aged 22)	Arizona State University (Tempe, Arizona)
7	204	Mike McCuistion	C	May 14, 1982 (aged 19)	Yucaipa HS (Yucaipa, California)
8	234	Chris Duffy	OF	April 20, 1980 (aged 21)	Arizona State University (Tempe, Arizona)
9	264	Jason Fellows	1B	—	Berkmar HS (Lilburn, Georgia)
10	294	Aaron Bulkley	SS	May 6, 1983 (aged 18)	Port Byron HS (Cayuga, New York)

Note

- Age at time of draft.

== Farm system ==
Level	Team	League	Manager
AAA	Nashville Sounds	Pacific Coast League	Marty Brown
AA	Altoona Curve	Eastern League	Dale Sveum
A	Lynchburg Hillcats	Carolina League	Curtis Wilkerson
A	Hickory Crawdads	South Atlantic League	Pete Mackanin
A-Short Season	Williamsport Crosscutters	New York–Penn League	Tony Beasley
Rookie	GCL Pirates	Gulf Coast League	Woody Huyke

LEAGUE CO-CHAMPIONS: Williamsport
