= 2001 Milwaukee Brewers season =

2001 Milwaukee Brewers
- League: National League
- Division: Central
- Ballpark: Miller Park
- City: Milwaukee, Wisconsin, United States
- Record: 68–94 (.420)
- Divisional place: 4th
- Owners: Bud Selig
- General managers: Dean Taylor
- Managers: Davey Lopes
- Television: WCGV-TV; FSN Wisconsin (Matt Vasgersian, Bill Schroeder, Len Kasper)
- Radio: WTMJ (AM) (Bob Uecker, Len Kasper, Jim Powell)

The 2001 Milwaukee Brewers season was the 32nd season for the Brewers in Milwaukee, their 4th in the National League, and their 33rd overall. The Brewers finished fourth in the National League Central with a record of 68 wins and 94 losses. The 2001 Brewers scored 740 runs, 11th in the NL, and ranked 1st in strikeouts, with 1,399. It was their first season at the newly built Miller Park.

== Offseason ==
- December 20, 2000: Brian Lesher was signed as a free agent with the Milwaukee Brewers.
- January 3, 2001: Mark Sweeney was signed as a free agent with the Milwaukee Brewers.
- January 8, 2001: Jason McDonald was signed as a free agent with the Milwaukee Brewers.
- February 8, 2001: Tony Fernández was signed as a free agent with the Milwaukee Brewers.
- February 24, 2001: Marquis Grissom was traded by the Milwaukee Brewers with a player to be named later to the Los Angeles Dodgers for Devon White. The Milwaukee Brewers sent Ruddy Lugo (June 1, 2001) to the Los Angeles Dodgers to complete the trade.

== Regular season ==
=== Season standings ===
NL Central
Team	W	L	Pct.	GB	Home	Road
Houston Astros	93	69	.574	—	44‍–‍37	49‍–‍32
St. Louis Cardinals	93	69	.574	—	54‍–‍28	39‍–‍41
Chicago Cubs	88	74	.543	5	48‍–‍33	40‍–‍41
Milwaukee Brewers	68	94	.420	25	36‍–‍45	32‍–‍49
Cincinnati Reds	66	96	.407	27	27‍–‍54	39‍–‍42
Pittsburgh Pirates	62	100	.383	31	38‍–‍43	24‍–‍57

==== Record vs. opponents ====
2001 National League record Source: MLB Standings Grid – 2001
Team	AZ	ATL	CHC	CIN	COL	FLA	HOU	LAD	MIL	MON	NYM	PHI	PIT	SD	SF	STL	AL
Arizona	—	5–2	6–3	5–1	13–6	4–2	2–4	10–9	3–3	3–3	3–3	3–4	4–2	12–7	10–9	2–4	7–8
Atlanta	2–5	—	4–2	4–2	4–2	9–10	3–3	2–5	3–3	13–6	10–9	10–9	5–1	3–3	4–2	3–3	9–9
Chicago	3–6	2–4	—	13–4	3–3	3–3	8–9	4–2	8–9	3–3	4–2	4–2	10–6	2–4	3–3	9–8	9–6
Cincinnati	1–5	2–4	4–13	—	3–6	4–2	6–11	4–2	6–10	4–2	4–2	2–4	9–8	2–4	4–2	7–10	4–11
Colorado	6–13	2–4	3–3	6–3	—	4–2	2–4	8–11	5–1	3–4	4–3	2–4	2–4	9–10	9–10	6–3	2–10
Florida	2–4	10–9	3–3	2–4	2–4	—	3–3	2–5	4–2	12–7	7–12	5–14	4–2	3–4	2–4	3–3	12–6
Houston	4–2	3–3	9–8	11–6	4–2	3–3	—	2–4	12–5	6–0	3–3	3–3	9–8	3–6	3–3	9–7	9–6
Los Angeles	9–10	5–2	2–4	2–4	11–8	5–2	4–2	—	5–1	2–4	2–4	3–3	7–2	9–10	11–8	3–3	6–9
Milwaukee	3–3	3–3	9–8	10–6	1–5	2–4	5–12	1–5	—	4–2	3–3	3–3	6–11	1–5	5–4	7–10	5–10
Montreal	3–3	6–13	3–3	2–4	4–3	7–12	0–6	4–2	2–4	—	8–11	9–10	5–1	3–3	2–5	2–4	8–10
New York	3–3	9–10	2–4	2–4	3–4	12–7	3–3	4–2	3–3	11–8	—	11–8	4–2	1–5	3–4	1–5	10–8
Philadelphia	4–3	9–10	2–4	4–2	4–2	14–5	3–3	3–3	3–3	10–9	8–11	—	5–1	5–2	3–3	2–4	7–11
Pittsburgh	2–4	1–5	6–10	8–9	4–2	2–4	8–9	2–7	11–6	1–5	2–4	1–5	—	2–4	1–5	3–14	8–7
San Diego	7–12	3–3	4–2	4–2	10–9	4–3	6–3	10–9	5–1	3–3	5–1	2–5	4–2	—	5–14	1–5	6–9
San Francisco	9–10	2–4	3–3	2–4	10–9	4–2	3–3	8–11	4–5	5–2	4–3	3–3	5–1	14–5	—	4–2	10–5
St. Louis	4–2	3–3	8–9	10–7	3–6	3–3	7–9	3–3	10–7	4–2	5–1	4–2	14–3	5–1	2–4	—	8–7

=== Transactions ===
- May 29, 2001: Tony Fernández was released by the Milwaukee Brewers.
- July 30, 2001: Dave Weathers was traded by the Milwaukee Brewers with Roberto Miniel (minors) to the Chicago Cubs for Ruben Quevedo and Pete Zoccolillo.

=== Roster ===
2001 Milwaukee Brewers
Roster
Pitchers: 47 Mike Buddie; 56 Rocky Coppinger; 33 Will Cunnane; 13 Jeff D'Amico; 28 Valerio de los Santos; 48 Mike DeJean; 40 Chad Fox; 53 Gus Gandarillas; 51 Jimmy Haynes; 46 Ray King; 38 Brandon Kolb; 23 Mark Leiter; 00 Curtis Leskanic; 55 Allen Levrault; 32 Nick Neugebauer; 27 Lance Painter; 26 Kyle Peterson; 37 Rubén Quevedo; 31 Paul Rigdon; 15 Ben Sheets; 52 Mac Suzuki; 49 David Weathers; 21 Jamey Wright	Catchers: 12 Henry Blanco; 49 Kevin Brown; 25 Raul Casanova; 50 Jesse Levis; Infielders: 10 Ronnie Belliard; 14 Mike Coolbaugh; 7 Tony Fernández; 18 José Hernández; 2 Tyler Houston; 1 Luis López; 8 Mark Loretta; 9 Elvis Peña; 11 Richie Sexson	Outfielders: 20 Jeromy Burnitz; 16 Lou Collier; 39 Angel Echevarria; 41 Jeffrey Hammonds; 5 Geoff Jenkins; 24 James Mouton; 9 Robert Perez; 7 Alex Sánchez; 33 Mark Sweeney; 22 Devon White	Manager: 30 Davey Lopes; Coaches: 45 Gary Allenson (Third Base); 36 Bob Apodaca (Pitching); 29 Rod Carew (Hitting); 35 Bill Castro (Bullpen); 3 Jerry Royster (Bench); 43 Luis Salazar (First Base)

== Player stats ==
= Indicates team leader

=== Batting ===
==== Starters by position ====
Note: Pos = Position; G = Games played; AB = At bats; R = Runs; H = Hits; HR = Home runs; RBI = Runs batted in; Avg. = Batting average; SB = Stolen bases

Pos	Player	G	AB	R	H	HR	RBI	Avg.	SB
C	Henry Blanco	104	314	33	66	6	31	.210	3
1B	Richie Sexson	158	598	94	162	45	125	.271	2
2B	Ron Belliard	101	364	69	96	11	36	.264	5
3B	Tyler Houston	75	235	36	68	12	38	.289	0
SS	José Hernández	152	542	67	135	25	78	.249	5
LF	Geoff Jenkins	105	397	60	105	20	63	.264	4
CF	Devon White	126	390	52	108	14	47	.277	18
RF	Jeromy Burnitz	154	562	104	141	34	100	.251	0

==== Other batters ====
Note: G = Games played; AB = At bats; R = Runs; H = Hits; HR = Home runs; RBI = Runs batted in; Avg. = Batting average; SB = Stolen bases

Player	G	AB	R	H	HR	RBI	Avg.	SB
Kevin Brown	17	43	7	9	4	12	.209	0
Raul Casanova	71	192	21	50	11	33	.260	0
Lou Collier	50	127	19	32	2	14	.252	5
Mike Coolbaugh	39	70	10	14	2	7	.200	0
Angel Echevarria	75	133	12	34	5	13	.256	0
Tony Fernández	28	64	6	18	1	3	.281	1
Jeffrey Hammonds	49	174	20	43	6	21	.247	5
Jesse Levis	12	33	6	8	0	3	.242	0
Luis López	92	222	22	60	4	18	.270	0
Mark Loretta	102	384	40	111	2	29	.289	1
James Mouton	75	138	20	34	2	10	.246	7
Elvis Peña	15	40	5	9	0	6	.225	2
Robert Pérez	2	5	0	0	0	0	.000	0
Alex Sánchez	30	68	7	14	0	4	.206	6
Mark Sweeney	48	89	9	23	3	11	.258	2

Note: Batting statistics for pitchers are not included above.

=== Pitching ===
==== Starting pitchers ====
Note: G = Games pitched; IP = Innings pitched; W = Wins; L = Losses; ERA = Earned run average; SO = Strikeouts

Player	G	IP	W	L	ERA	SO
Jamey Wright	33	194.2	11	12	4.90	129
Jimmy Haynes	31	172.2	8	17	4.85	112
Ben Sheets	25	151.1	11	10	4.76	94
Paul Rigdon	15	79.1	3	5	5.79	49
Rubén Quevedo	10	56.2	4	5	4.61	60
Jeff D'Amico	10	47.1	2	4	6.08	32
Nick Neugebauer	2	6.0	1	1	7.50	11

==== Other pitchers ====
Note: G = Games pitched; IP = Innings pitched; W = Wins; L = Losses; ERA = Earned run average; SO = Strikeouts

Player	G	IP	W	L	ERA	SO
Allen Levrault	32	130.2	6	10	6.06	80
Mac Suzuki	15	56.0	3	5	5.30	47
Rocky Coppinger	8	22.2	1	0	6.75	15
Kyle Peterson	3	14.2	1	2	5.52	12

==== Relief pitchers ====
Note: G = Games pitched; W = Wins; L = Losses; SV = Saves; ERA = Earned run average; SO = Strikeouts

Player	G	W	L	SV	ERA	SO
Curt Leskanic	70	2	6	17	3.63	64
Ray King	82	0	4	1	3.60	49
Mike DeJean	75	4	2	2	2.77	68
Chad Fox	65	5	2	2	1.89	80
David Weathers	52	3	4	4	2.03	46
Will Cunnane	31	0	3	0	5.40	37
Mike Buddie	31	0	1	2	3.89	22
Mark Leiter	20	2	1	0	3.75	26
Gus Gandarillas	16	0	0	0	5.49	7
Lance Painter	13	1	0	0	4.22	6
Brandon Kolb	10	0	0	0	13.03	8
Mark Loretta	1	0	0	0	0.00	2
Valerio De Los Santos	1	0	0	0	9.00	1

== Farm system ==
The Brewers' farm system consisted of eight minor league affiliates in 2001. The Brewers operated a Venezuelan Summer League team as a co-op with the Boston Red Sox and Minnesota Twins. The Huntsville Stars won the Southern League championship, and the DSL Brewers won the Dominican Summer League championship.

Level	Team	League	Manager
Triple-A	Indianapolis Indians	International League	Wendell Kim
Double-A	Huntsville Stars	Southern League	Ed Romero
Class A-Advanced	High Desert Mavericks	California League	Frank Kremblas
Class A	Beloit Snappers	Midwest League	Don Money
Rookie	Ogden Raptors	Pioneer League	Ed Sedar
Rookie	AZL Brewers	Arizona League	Carlos Lezcano
Rookie	DSL Brewers	Dominican Summer League	Mike Guerrero
Rookie	VSL San Joaquín	Venezuelan Summer League	—
