= 2001 San Francisco Giants season =

2001 San Francisco Giants
- League: National League
- Division: West
- Ballpark: Pacific Bell Park
- City: San Francisco, California
- Record: 90–72 (.556)
- Divisional place: 2nd
- Owners: Peter Magowan
- General managers: Brian Sabean
- Managers: Dusty Baker
- Television: KTVU (Mike Krukow, Ted Robinson, Jon Miller, Lon Simmons); FSN Bay Area (Mike Krukow, Duane Kuiper)
- Radio: KNBR (Mike Krukow, Lon Simmons, Ted Robinson, Jon Miller, Duane Kuiper)

The 2001 San Francisco Giants season was the Giants' 119th year in Major League Baseball, their 44th year in San Francisco since their move from New York following the 1957 season, and their second at Pacific Bell Park. The team finished in second place in the National League West with a 90–72 record, two games behind the Arizona Diamondbacks, and they finished three games behind the St. Louis Cardinals for the Wild Card spot. The Giants set franchise records for home runs (235) and pinch hit home runs (14).

== Offseason ==
- November 18, 2000: Bill Mueller was traded by the San Francisco Giants to the Chicago Cubs for Tim Worrell.
- January 11, 2001: Eric Davis was signed as a free agent with the San Francisco Giants.

== Regular season ==
- October 4, 2001: Barry Bonds hits his 70th home run of the season off Houston pitcher Wilfredo Rodriguez, to tie Mark McGwire's single season home run record.

=== Opening Day starters ===
- Rich Aurilia
- Marvin Benard
- Barry Bonds
- Russ Davis
- Bobby Estalella
- Liván Hernández
- Jeff Kent
- Armando Ríos
- J. T. Snow

=== Season standings ===
NL West
Team	W	L	Pct.	GB	Home	Road
Arizona Diamondbacks	92	70	.568	—	48‍–‍33	44‍–‍37
San Francisco Giants	90	72	.556	2	49‍–‍32	41‍–‍40
Los Angeles Dodgers	86	76	.531	6	44‍–‍37	42‍–‍39
San Diego Padres	79	83	.488	13	35‍–‍46	44‍–‍37
Colorado Rockies	73	89	.451	19	41‍–‍40	32‍–‍49

==== Record vs. opponents ====
2001 National League record Source: MLB Standings Grid – 2001
Team	AZ	ATL	CHC	CIN	COL	FLA	HOU	LAD	MIL	MON	NYM	PHI	PIT	SD	SF	STL	AL
Arizona	—	5–2	6–3	5–1	13–6	4–2	2–4	10–9	3–3	3–3	3–3	3–4	4–2	12–7	10–9	2–4	7–8
Atlanta	2–5	—	4–2	4–2	4–2	9–10	3–3	2–5	3–3	13–6	10–9	10–9	5–1	3–3	4–2	3–3	9–9
Chicago	3–6	2–4	—	13–4	3–3	3–3	8–9	4–2	8–9	3–3	4–2	4–2	10–6	2–4	3–3	9–8	9–6
Cincinnati	1–5	2–4	4–13	—	3–6	4–2	6–11	4–2	6–10	4–2	4–2	2–4	9–8	2–4	4–2	7–10	4–11
Colorado	6–13	2–4	3–3	6–3	—	4–2	2–4	8–11	5–1	3–4	4–3	2–4	2–4	9–10	9–10	6–3	2–10
Florida	2–4	10–9	3–3	2–4	2–4	—	3–3	2–5	4–2	12–7	7–12	5–14	4–2	3–4	2–4	3–3	12–6
Houston	4–2	3–3	9–8	11–6	4–2	3–3	—	2–4	12–5	6–0	3–3	3–3	9–8	3–6	3–3	9–7	9–6
Los Angeles	9–10	5–2	2–4	2–4	11–8	5–2	4–2	—	5–1	2–4	2–4	3–3	7–2	9–10	11–8	3–3	6–9
Milwaukee	3–3	3–3	9–8	10–6	1–5	2–4	5–12	1–5	—	4–2	3–3	3–3	6–11	1–5	5–4	7–10	5–10
Montreal	3–3	6–13	3–3	2–4	4–3	7–12	0–6	4–2	2–4	—	8–11	9–10	5–1	3–3	2–5	2–4	8–10
New York	3–3	9–10	2–4	2–4	3–4	12–7	3–3	4–2	3–3	11–8	—	11–8	4–2	1–5	3–4	1–5	10–8
Philadelphia	4–3	9–10	2–4	4–2	4–2	14–5	3–3	3–3	3–3	10–9	8–11	—	5–1	5–2	3–3	2–4	7–11
Pittsburgh	2–4	1–5	6–10	8–9	4–2	2–4	8–9	2–7	11–6	1–5	2–4	1–5	—	2–4	1–5	3–14	8–7
San Diego	7–12	3–3	4–2	4–2	10–9	4–3	6–3	10–9	5–1	3–3	5–1	2–5	4–2	—	5–14	1–5	6–9
San Francisco	9–10	2–4	3–3	2–4	10–9	4–2	3–3	8–11	4–5	5–2	4–3	3–3	5–1	14–5	—	4–2	10–5
St. Louis	4–2	3–3	8–9	10–7	3–6	3–3	7–9	3–3	10–7	4–2	5–1	4–2	14–3	5–1	2–4	—	8–7

=== Notable transactions ===
- June 29, 2001: Alan Embree was traded by the San Francisco Giants with cash to the Chicago White Sox for Derek Hasselhoff (minors).
- July 4, 2001: Bobby Estalella was traded by the San Francisco Giants with Joe Smith (minors) to the New York Yankees for Brian Boehringer.
- July 24, 2001: Andrés Galarraga was traded by the San Francisco Giants to the Texas Rangers for Todd Ozias (minors), Chris Magruder and Erasmo Ramirez.
- July 27, 2001: Felipe Crespo was traded by the San Francisco Giants to the Philadelphia Phillies for Wayne Gomes.
- July 30, 2001: John Vander Wal was traded by the Pittsburgh Pirates with Jason Schmidt to the San Francisco Giants for Armando Ríos and Ryan Vogelsong.

=== Roster ===
2001 San Francisco Giants
Roster
Pitchers: 32 Kurt Ainsworth; 43 Brian Boehringer; 40 Jason Christiansen; 56 Alan Embree; 55 Shawn Estes; 38 Aaron Fultz; 26 Mark Gardner; 2 Wayne Gomes; 61 Liván Hernández; 15,43 Ryan Jensen; 31 Robb Nen; 48 Russ Ortiz; 47 Félix Rodríguez; 46 Kirk Rueter; 29 Jason Schmidt; 14 Ryan Vogelsong; 45 Tim Worrell; 41 Chad Zerbe	Catchers: 29 Bobby Estalella; 9,13 Edwards Guzman; 33 Benito Santiago; 9 Yorvit Torrealba; Infielders: 35 Rich Aurilia; 52 Felipe Crespo; 18 Russ Davis; 39 Pedro Feliz; 14 Andrés Galarraga; 21 Jeff Kent; 34 Ramón Martínez; 37 Damon Minor; 1 Cody Ransom; 6 J. T. Snow	Outfielders: 7 Marvin Benard; 25 Barry Bonds; 22 Eric Davis; 23 Shawon Dunston; 18 Jalal Leach; 8 Calvin Murray; 56 Dante Powell; 1 Armando Ríos; 28 John Vander Wal	Manager: 12 Dusty Baker; Coaches: 20 Gene Clines (hitting); 15 Sonny Jackson (third base); 59 Juan Lopez (bullpen); 19 Dave Righetti (pitching); 5 Robby Thompson (first base); 10 Ron Wotus (bench)

== Player stats ==
= Indicates team leader

=== Batting ===
==== Starters by position ====
Note: Pos = Position; G = Games played; AB = At bats; H = Hits; Avg. = Batting average; HR = Home runs; RBI = Runs batted in

Pos	Player	G	AB	H	Avg.	HR	RBI
C	Benito Santiago	133	477	125	.262	6	45
1B	J. T. Snow	101	285	70	.246	8	34
2B	Jeff Kent	159	607	181	.298	22	106
3B	Ramón Martínez	128	391	99	.253	5	37
SS	Rich Aurilia	156	636	206	.324	37	97
LF	Barry Bonds	153	476	156	.328	73	137
CF	Calvin Murray	106	326	80	.245	6	25
RF	Armando Ríos	93	316	82	.259	14	49

==== Other batters ====
Note: G = Games played; AB = At bats; H = Hits; Avg. = Batting average; HR = Home runs; RBI = Runs batted in

Player	G	AB	H	Avg.	HR	RBI
Marvin Benard	129	392	104	.265	15	44
Pedro Feliz	94	220	50	.227	7	22
Shawon Dunston	88	186	52	.280	9	25
Russ Davis	53	167	43	.257	7	17
Eric Davis	74	156	32	.205	4	22
Andrés Galarraga	49	156	45	.288	7	35
John Vander Wal	49	139	35	.252	3	20
Edwards Guzmán	61	115	28	.243	3	7
Bobby Estalella	29	93	19	.204	3	10
Felipe Crespo	40	66	13	.197	4	10
Damon Minor	19	45	7	.156	0	3
Jalal Leach	8	10	1	.100	0	1
Cody Ransom	9	7	0	.000	0	0
Dante Powell	13	6	2	.333	0	0
Yorvit Torrealba	3	4	2	.500	0	2

=== Pitching ===
==== Starting pitchers ====
Note: G = Games pitched; IP = Innings pitched; W = Wins; L = Losses; ERA = Earned run average; SO = Strikeouts

Player	G	IP	W	L	ERA	SO
Liván Hernández	34	226.2	13	15	5.24	138
Russ Ortiz	33	218.2	17	9	3.29	169
Kirk Reuter	34	195.1	14	12	4.42	83
Shawn Estes	27	159.0	9	8	4.02	109
Jason Schmidt	11	66.1	7	1	3.39	65

==== Other pitchers ====
Note: G = Games pitched; IP = Innings pitched; W = Wins; L = Losses; ERA = Earned run average; SO = Strikeouts

Player	G	IP	W	L	ERA	SO
Mark Gardner	23	91.2	5	5	5.40	53
Ryan Jensen	10	42.1	1	2	4.25	26

==== Relief pitchers ====
Note: G = Games pitched; W = Wins; L = Losses; SV = Saves; ERA = Earned run average; SO = Strikeouts

Player	G	W	L	SV	ERA	SO
Robb Nen	79	4	5	45	3.01	93
Félix Rodríguez	80	9	1	0	1.68	91
Tim Worrell	73	2	5	0	3.45	63
Aaron Fultz	66	3	1	1	4.56	67
Brian Boehringer	29	0	3	1	4.19	27
Chad Zerbe	27	3	0	0	3.92	22
Jason Christiansen	25	1	0	0	1.59	12
Alan Embree	22	0	2	0	11.25	25
Ryan Vogelsong	13	0	3	0	5.65	17
Wayne Gomes	13	2	0	0	8.40	17
Kurt Ainsworth	2	0	0	0	13.50	3

== Awards and honors ==
- Barry Bonds, Associated Press Athlete of the Year
- Barry Bonds, National League Most Valuable Player
- Mark Gardner P, Willie Mac Award
- Benito Santiago C, Willie Mac Award

All-Star Game

- Jeff Kent, second baseman, starter
- Barry Bonds, outfield, starter

=== Team leaders ===
- Games – Jeff Kent (159)
- At-bats – Rich Aurilia (636)
- Runs – Barry Bonds (129)
- Hits – Rich Aurilia (206)
- Doubles – Jeff Kent (49)
- Triples – Jeff Kent (6)
- Home runs – Barry Bonds (73)
- Runs batted in – Barry Bonds (137)
- Walks – Barry Bonds (177)
- Batting average – Barry Bonds (.328)
- On-base percentage – Barry Bonds (.515)
- Slugging average – Barry Bonds (.863)
- Stolen bases – Barry Bonds (13)
- Wins – Russ Ortiz (17)
- Innings pitched – Liván Hernández (226 2/3)
- Earned run average – Russ Ortiz (3.29)
- Strikeouts – Russ Ortiz (169)

== Barry Bonds 73 home runs ==
Number	Date	Pitcher	Team	Inning	Length
1	04-02-2001	Woody Williams	San Diego	5th	420'
2	04-12-2001	Adam Eaton	San Diego	4th	417'
3	04-13-2001	Jamey Wright	Milwaukee	1st	440'
4	04-14-2001	Jimmy Haynes	Milwaukee	5th	410'
5	04-15-2001	David Weathers	Milwaukee	8th	390'
6	04-17-2001	Terry Adams	Los Angeles	8th	417'
7	04-18-2001	Chan Ho Park	Los Angeles	7th	420'
8	04-20-2001	Jimmy Haynes	Milwaukee	4th	410'
9	04-24-2001	Jim Brower	Cincinnati	3rd	380'
10	04-26-2001	Scott Sullivan	Cincinnati	8th	430'
11	04-29-2001	Manny Aybar	Chicago Cubs	4th	370'
12	05-02-2001	Todd Ritchie	Pittsburgh	5th	420'
13	05-03-2001	Jimmy Anderson	Pittsburgh	1st	420'
14	05-04-2001	Bruce Chen	Philadelphia	6th	360'
15	05-11-2001	Steve Trachsel	New York Mets	4th	410'
16	05-17-2001	Chuck Smith	Florida	3rd	420'
17	05-18-2001	Mike Remlinger	Atlanta	8th	391'
18	05-19-2001	Odalis Pérez	Atlanta	3rd	416'
19	05-19-2001	Jose Cabrera	Atlanta	7th	440'
20	05-19-2001	Jason Marquis	Atlanta	8th	410'
21	05-20-2001	John Burkett	Atlanta	1st	415'
22	05-20-2001	Mike Remlinger	Atlanta	7th	436'
23	05-21-2001	Curt Schilling	Arizona	4th	430'
24	05-22-2001	Russ Springer	Arizona	9th	410'
25	05-24-2001	John Thomson	Colorado	3rd	400'
26	05-27-2001	Denny Neagle	Colorado	1st	390'
27	05-30-2001	Robert Ellis	Arizona	2nd	420'
28	05-30-2001	Robert Ellis	Arizona	6th	410'
29	06-01-2001	Shawn Chacón	Colorado	3rd	420'
30	06-04-2001	Bobby J. Jones	San Diego	4th	410'
31	06-05-2001	Wascar Serrano	San Diego	3rd	410'
32	06-07-2001	Brian Lawrence	San Diego	7th	450'
33	06-12-2001	Pat Rapp	Anaheim	1st	320'
34	06-14-2001	Lou Pote	Anaheim	6th	430'
35	06-15-2001	Mark Mulder	Oakland	1st	380'
36	06-15-2001	Mark Mulder	Oakland	6th	430'
37	06-19-2001	Adam Eaton	San Diego	5th	375'
38	06-20-2001	Rodney Myers	San Diego	8th	347'
39	06-23-2001	Darryl Kile	St. Louis	1st	380'
40	07-12-2001	Paul Abbott	Seattle	1st	429'
41	07-18-2001	Mike Hampton	Colorado	4th	320'
42	07-18-2001	Mike Hampton	Colorado	5th	360'
43	07-26-2001	Curt Schilling	Arizona	4th	375'
44	07-26-2001	Curt Schilling	Arizona	5th	370'
45	07-27-2001	Brian Anderson	Arizona	4th	440'
46	08-01-2001	Joe Beimel	Pittsburgh	1st	400'
47	08-04-2001	Nelson Figueroa	Philadelphia	6th	405'
48	08-07-2001	Danny Graves	Cincinnati	11th	430'
49	08-09-2001	Scott Winchester	Cincinnati	3rd	350'
50	08-11-2001	Joe Borowski	Chicago Cubs	2nd	396'
51	08-14-2001	Ricky Bones	Florida	6th	410'
52	08-16-2001	A. J. Burnett	Florida	4th	380'
53	08-16-2001	Vic Darensbourg	Florida	8th	430'
54	08-18-2001	Jason Marquis	Atlanta	8th	415'
55	08-23-2001	Graeme Lloyd	Montreal	9th	380'
56	08-27-2001	Kevin Appier	New York Mets	5th	375'
57	08-31-2001	John Thomson	Colorado	8th	400'
58	09-03-2001	Jason Jennings	Colorado	4th	435'
59	09-04-2001	Miguel Batista	Arizona	7th	420'
60	09-06-2001	Albie Lopez	Arizona	2nd	420'
61	09-09-2001	Scott Elarton	Colorado	1st	488'
62	09-09-2001	Scott Elarton	Colorado	5th	361'
63	09-09-2001	Todd Belitz	Colorado	11th	394'
64*	09-20-2001	Wade Miller	Houston	5th	410'
65	09-23-2001	Jason Middlebrook	San Diego	2nd	411'
66	09-23-2001	Jason Middlebrook	San Diego	4th	365'
67	09-24-2001	James Baldwin	Los Angeles	7th	360'
68	09-28-2001	Jason Middlebrook	San Diego	2nd	440'
69	09-29-2001	Chuck McElroy	San Diego	6th	435'
70	10-04-2001	Wilfredo Rodriguez	Houston	9th	480'
71	10-05-2001	Chan Ho Park	Los Angeles	1st	440'
72	10-05-2001	Chan Ho Park	Los Angeles	3rd	410'
73	10-07-2001	Dennis Springer	Los Angeles	1st	380'

== Barry Bonds accomplishments ==
The following MLB records were broken by Barry Bonds in 2001:

- 73 home runs, Old record: 70, Mark McGwire (1998)
- Major League record, .863 slugging percentage, Old record: .847, Babe Ruth (1920). Only Ruth in 1920 and 1921 (.846) had ever slugged over .800. The old NL record was .756 by Rogers Hornsby in 1925.
- 177 walks, Old record: 170, Ruth (1923)
- .515 on-base percentage, First .500+ OBP since Ted Williams and Mickey Mantle in 1957. Highest in NL since 1900.
- 1.379 combined on-base + slugging, Ties old record set by Ruth in 1920. Ruth was the only other player to ever top 1.300 (1920, 1921, 1923).
- 107 extra-base hits, Ties Chuck Klein (1930) for NL record and third all time behind Ruth (119, 1921) and Lou Gehrig (117, 1927).
- Home run percentage, 15.34 homers per 100 at-bats; old record: 13.75, Mark McGwire, 1998
- At age 36, Bonds became the oldest player to lead the Major Leagues in home runs in one season

== Farm system ==
Level	Team	League	Manager
AAA	Fresno Grizzlies	Pacific Coast League	Shane Turner
AA	Shreveport Swamp Dragons	Texas League	Bill Russell
A	San Jose Giants	California League	Lenn Sakata
A	Hagerstown Suns	South Atlantic League	Bill Hayes
A-Short Season	Salem-Keizer Volcanoes	Northwest League	Fred Stanley
Rookie	AZL Giants	Arizona League	Keith Comstock

LEAGUE CHAMPIONS: Salem-Keizer; LEAGUE CO-CHAMPIONS: San Jose
