= Dave Coggin =

American baseball player (born 1976)

- Pitcher
- Born: October 30, 1976 (age 49); Covina, California, U.S.
- Batted: Right Threw: Right

MLB debut
- June 23, 2000, for the Philadelphia Phillies

Last MLB appearance
- August 28, 2002, for the Philadelphia Phillies

MLB statistics
- Win–loss record: 10–12
- Earned run average: 4.52
- Strikeouts: 143
- Stats at Baseball Reference

Teams
- Philadelphia Phillies (2000–2002)

David Raymond Coggin (born October 30, 1976), is an American former professional baseball pitcher, who played in Major League Baseball (MLB) for the Philadelphia Phillies (2000–2002).

== Career ==
=== Philadelphia Phillies ===
Coggin was drafted by the Philadelphia Phillies in the first round, with the 30th overall selection, of the 1995 Major League Baseball draft. He progressed through the minor leagues from 1995 to 2000, appearing for the rookie–level Martinsville Phillies, Single–A Piedmont Boll Weevils, High–A Clearwater Phillies, Double–A Reading Phillies, and Triple–A Scranton/Wilkes-Barre Red Barons.

On June 23, 2000, Coggin made his MLB debut with Philadelphia, and finished the season with 5 starts. He spent 2001 as part of the Phillies' rotation, and pitched mostly out of the bullpen in 2002. In 60 games (29 starts) across the three seasons, Coggin accumulated a 10–12 record and 4.52 ERA with 143 strikeouts across 199.0 innings pitched.

Coggin would spend the 2003 and 2004 seasons relegated to the minor leagues with Clearwater and Scranton, and elected free agency on October 15, 2004.

On March 1, 2005, Coggin signed a minor league contract with the Colorado Rockies. However, he was released a month later on April 1.

=== Tampa Bay Devil Rays ===
On June 29, 2005, Coggin signed a minor league contract with the Tampa Bay Devil Rays. In 18 games for the High–A Visalia Oaks, he registered a 3–2 record and 3.38 ERA with 27 strikeouts and 6 saves across 29 1/3 innings pitched. Coggin elected free agency following the season on October 15.

=== Atlanta Braves ===
On March 8, 2006, Coggin signed a minor league contract with the Atlanta Braves. He pitched in 6 games for the Double–A Mississippi Braves, recording a 4.95 ERA with 10 strikeouts in 20 innings. Coggin was released by the Braves organization on June 24.

=== Orange County Flyers ===
In 2007, Coggin played for the Orange County Flyers of the Golden Baseball League, pitching in 12 games and logging a 6.94 ERA with 6 strikeouts and 6 saves.
