= Bill Ortega =

Cuban baseball player (born 1975)

- Pinch hitter
- Born: July 24, 1975 (age 50); Havana, Cuba
- Batted: Right Threw: Right

MLB debut
- September 7, 2001, for the St. Louis Cardinals

Last MLB appearance
- September 28, 2001, for the St. Louis Cardinals

MLB statistics
- Batting average: .200
- At bats: 5
- Hits: 1
- Stats at Baseball Reference

Teams
- St. Louis Cardinals (2001)

William Ortega Bobadilla (born July 24, 1975) is a Cuban former professional baseball player who played in five games for the St. Louis Cardinals in the 2001 season, all as a pinch hitter. He batted and threw right-handed.

In Cuba, Ortega watched Major League Baseball games on videotapes which had been smuggled out of Guantanamo Bay Naval Base. Before defecting, he played for Industriales in the Cuban National Series. Ortega defected from Cuba during an international baseball tournament in Mexico in November 1996, leaving a wife and two-year-old son behind in Cuba. He was signed by the Cardinals in 1997 after a tryout.

Ortega was an outfielder in the minor leagues. In his five major league pinch-hitting appearances, Ortega had one hit in five at-bats.

== See also ==
- List of baseball players who defected from Cuba
