= Crockett High School (Crockett, Texas) =

Public school in Texas, United States

Coordinates: 31.3057°N 95.4729°W

Location
- 1600 South Loop 304; Crockett, Texas 75835-3404; United States

Information
- School type: Public high school
- School district: Crockett Independent School District
- Superintendent: John Emerich
- Principal: Deborah Revels
- Staff: 30.97 (FTE)
- Grades: 9-12
- Enrollment: 389 (2023-2024)
- Student to teacher ratio: 12.56
- Colors: Blue & White
- Athletics conference: UIL Class 3A
- Mascot: Bulldog
- Yearbook: Bulldog
- Website: Crockett High School

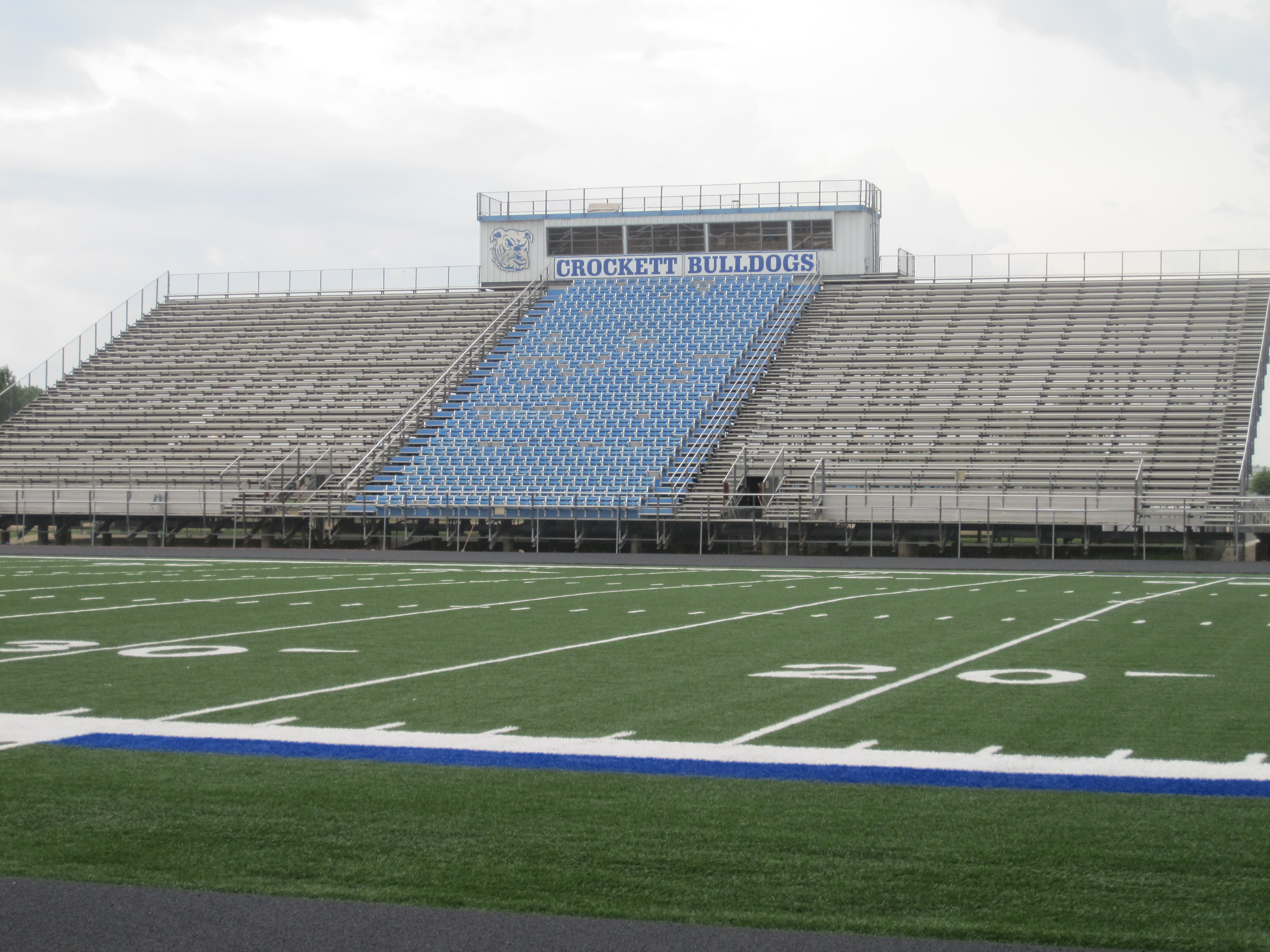
Crockett High School Bulldogs play their home games in this stadium. The track around the field was refurbished in the spring of 2010.

Crockett High School is a public high school located in Crockett, Texas (USA) and classified as a 3A school by the UIL. It is part of the Crockett Independent School District located in central Houston County. In 2015, the school was rated "Met Standard" by the Texas Education Agency.

== Athletics ==
The Crockett Bulldogs compete in these sports -

Cross Country, Volleyball, Football, Basketball, Powerlifting, Golf, Track, Softball & Baseball

=== State titles ===
Crockett (UIL)

- Baseball
  - 1982(3A), 1996(3A)

Crockett Bunche (PVIL)

- Baseball
  - 1957(2A-PVIL), 1961(3A-PVIL)
- Boys Basketball
  - 1968(2A-PVIL)

==== State finalists ====
Crockett (UIL)

- Football
  - 1990(3A)
- Boys Basketball
  - 1998(3A)
- Girls Basketball
  - 2007(3A)

Boys Golf 2014 (3A)

Crockett Bunche (PVIL)

- Baseball
  - 1962(3A-PVIL)
- Boys Basketball
  - 1969(3A-PVIL)
