= Jason Karnuth =

American baseball player (born 1976)

- Relief pitcher
- Born: May 15, 1976 (age 50); LaGrange, Illinois, U.S.
- Batted: Right Threw: Right

MLB debut
- April 20, 2001, for the St. Louis Cardinals

Last MLB appearance
- September 28, 2005, for the Detroit Tigers

MLB statistics
- Win–loss record: 0-0
- Earned run average: 2.70
- Strikeouts: 1
- Stats at Baseball Reference

Teams
- St. Louis Cardinals (2001); Detroit Tigers (2005)

Jason Andre Karnuth (born May 15, 1976) is an American former professional baseball relief pitcher. He played in Major League Baseball (MLB) for the St. Louis Cardinals and Detroit Tigers.

== Career ==
In 2007, Karnuth was the accidental victim of an attack by Roman Colón. During Colón's rehab assignment in Triple-A Toledo, Colón was involved in an altercation with fellow pitcher Jordan Tata. During the course of the fight, Colón attempted to punch Tata and instead landed a punch to the face of Karnuth, the Mud Hens closer who was trying to intercede and break up the fight. The resulting injury caused Karnuth to be admitted to the hospital and undergo plastic surgery to his face. According to his wife, who filed an assault report against Colón on her husband's behalf, Karnuth required a titanium plate to be screwed into his head. Karnuth missed most of the 2007 season as a result of the injuries. The Tigers suspended Colón for 7 days after the incident. On January 15, 2008, Colón pleaded no contest to an assault charge and was sentenced to 200 hours of community service.

Karnuth retired from professional baseball on February 29, 2008.
