= Tony McKnight =

American baseball player (born 1977)

- Pitcher
- Born: June 29, 1977 (age 49); Texarkana, Arkansas, U.S.
- Batted: Left Threw: Right

MLB debut
- August 10, 2000, for the Houston Astros

Last MLB appearance
- October 6, 2001, for the Pittsburgh Pirates

MLB statistics
- Win–loss record: 7–7
- Earned run average: 4.63
- Strikeouts: 69
- Stats at Baseball Reference

Teams
- Houston Astros (2000–2001); Pittsburgh Pirates (2001)

Tony Mark McKnight (born June 29, 1977) is an American former Major League Baseball pitcher. He played during two seasons at the major league level for the Houston Astros and Pittsburgh Pirates. He was drafted by the Astros in the 1st round (22nd pick) of the 1995 amateur draft. McKnight played his first professional season with their Rookie league Gulf Coast Astros in 1995, and his last with the Los Angeles Dodgers' Triple-A Las Vegas 51s in 2003.

On July 31, 2001, the Astros traded McKnight to the Pirates for Mike Williams.

Prior to the 2017 college baseball season, McKnight began volunteering as an assistant coach for the baseball team at Texas A&M University–Texarkana.
