= 2001 Houston Astros season =

40th season in Major League Baseball for the Houston Astros

2001 Houston Astros
- National League Central champions
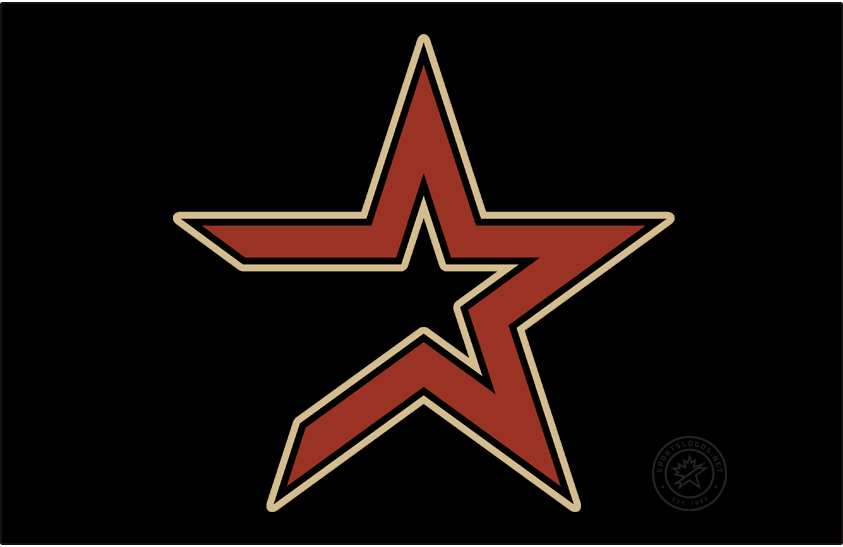
- League: National League
- Division: Central
- Ballpark: Enron Field
- City: Houston, Texas
- Record: 93–69 (.574)
- Divisional place: 1st
- Owners: Drayton McLane, Jr.
- General managers: Gerry Hunsicker
- Managers: Larry Dierker
- Television: KNWS-TV; FSN Southwest (Bill Brown, Jim Deshaies, Bill Worrell)
- Radio: KTRH (Milo Hamilton, Alan Ashby); KXYZ (Francisco Ernesto Ruiz, Alex Treviño)

The 2001 Houston Astros season was the 40th season for the Major League Baseball (MLB) franchise located in Houston, Texas, their 37th as the Astros, 40th in the National League (NL), eighth in the NL Central division, and second at Enron Field, later christened as Minute Maid Park. The Astros entered the season with a 72–90 record, in fourth place and 23 games behind the division-champion St. Louis Cardinals.

On April 3, pitcher Scott Elarton made his only Opening Day start for the Astros, who hosted the Milwaukee Brewers and prevailed, 11–3. On May 4, Craig Biggio became the first player in franchise history to attain 2,000 career hits. In the amateur draft, the Astros' first round selection was second baseman Chris Burke, at 10th overall. On June 8, Houston played their first interleague game against their in-state rivals, the Texas Rangers, initiating the annual competition to win the Silver Boot trophy.

Outfielders Moisés Alou (fourth selection) and Lance Berkman (first), and pitcher Billy Wagner (second) each represented the Astros and played for the National League at the MLB All-Star Game.

On July 18 versus St. Louis, Jeff Bagwell became the fourth player in Astros history to hit for the cycle, and fifth time overall. During the season, Bagwell also became first player in major league history to produce six consecutive seasons each with 30 home runs, 100 runs batted in (RBI), 100 runs scored, and 100 bases on balls (BB).

Berkman set the major league record for extra-base hits by a switch hitter (94) while becoming the 16th major leaguer to log at least 55 doubles in one season. Three Astros produced hitting streaks of 18 games or more, including Alou (23), Berkman (21), and Biggio (18), while a fourth, Richard Hidalgo hit in 17 consecutive dating to the prior season.

In the regular season finale on October 7, Houston defeated St. Louis, with the two teams sporting identical 93–69 win–loss records for best in the National League. However, the Astros retained the tiebreaker by virtue of claiming the season series, 9–7. Hence, the Cardinals were situated as the NL Wild Card winners.

For the fourth time in five seasons, the Astros claimed the NL Central title, their seventh division title and seventh playoff appearance in franchise history. For the third time in five seasons, the Astros faced the Atlanta Braves in a National League Division Series (NLDS). The Braves defeated them for the third time in a three-game sweep. Days later, manager Larry Dierker resigned. The Astros, forestalled in all their attempts to win a playoff series, would not do so until 2004. This was also Houston's final division title in the National League until 2017.

Following the season, catcher Brad Ausmus won his first career Gold Glove Award. Starter Roy Oswalt was chosen as The Sporting News NL Rookie Pitcher of the Year, (Note: From 1961–2003, The Sporting News declared one rookie pitcher and position player from each league, the NL and the American League (AL), for this award. Starting in 2004, this system was modified to selecting one rookie from each league for the award, regardless of position.) and to the Topps All-Star Rookie Team. Also, the Houston Astros were also recognized as Organization of the Year by the Baseball America and other outlets.

== Offseason ==
Summary

The Astros concluded the 2000 campaign at 72–90 (.444), ranking fourth of six clubs in the NL Central division and 23 games behind (GB) the division-champion St. Louis Cardinals, also Houston's first season at Enron Field. For the first time in team history, the Astros drew more than 3 million fans. This was Houston's first losing season since 1991, establishing a then-club record eight consecutive seasons with a winning percentage of .500 or higher.

During a Houston Baseball Dinner on February 8, Craig F. Cullinan Jr., one of the key organizers along with R. E. "Bob" Smith, Judge Roy Hofheinz and George Kirksey to expand Major League Baseball into Houston, was honored at a Houston Baseball Writers dinner with a lifetime achievement award. Cullinan later served as the Colt .45s first team president in 1962.

Transactions

- January 2, 2001: Charlie Hayes signed as a free agent with the Houston Astros.
- January 3, 2001: Kent Bottenfield signed as a free agent with the Houston Astros.

== Regular season ==
=== Summary ===
==== Opening Day ====
Opening Day starting lineup
Uniform	Player	Position
4	Julio Lugo	Shortstop
7	Craig Biggio	Second baseman
5	Jeff Bagwell	First baseman
17	Lance Berkman	Left fielder
15	Richard Hidalgo	Center fielder
31	Daryle Ward	Right fielder
11	Brad Ausmus	Catcher
6	Chris Truby	Third baseman
50	Scott Elarton	Pitcher
Venue: Enron Field • Final: Houston 11, Milwaukee 3 Sources:

The Astros hosted their first Opening Day at Enron Field on April 3, which featured Daryle Ward—substituting for an injured Moisés Alou—belting the first grand slam during an Opening Day at home in franchise annals. Meanwhile, Craig Biggio, returning from knee surgery, achieved his first career five-hit game. (Note: The first of two for Biggio, his second was on June 28, 2007, the day in which he collected his 3,000th hit.) Ward's blast reprised that of teammate Richard Hidalgo's just one year earlier, who hit the first grand slam on any Opening Day for Houston on the road at Three Rivers Stadium.

Biggio singled in the bottom of the first off Milwuakee Brewers Opening Day starter, Jimmy Haynes for the first hit of the season for the club, and Jeff Bagwell drew a base on balls. Hidalgo, meanwhile, again started the season off strong, slashing a two-run triple during the bottom of the first to score Biggio and Bagwell for Houston's first two tallies of the brand-new season. In the bottom of the third frame, Lance Berkman received a hit by pitch from Haynes with the bases loaded for his first run batted in (RBI) of the year. One out later, Ward cleared the bases with his big fly. Another out later, Chris Truby joined the fireworks with his first blast of the season, staking Houston to a 8–1 lead.

The Astros' Opening Day starter, Scott Elarton, tossed six solid innings with two runs allowed to pick up the victory. Hidalgo also doubled in Biggio during the bottom of the seventh and Ward continued his big with day with a single that scored Berkman and Hidalgo. Biggio scored thrice.

Ward's 6 RBI set a career high, while also tying the Opening Day club record, set during the inaugural game in franchise history by Román Mejías in 1962. It was also Ward's first career grand slam.

==== Rest of April ====
On April 4, Richard Hidalgo swatted his first career walk-off home run, while Daryle Ward produced his first career four-hit game in the major leagues, and sliced his first two doubles of the season. The game-ender was Hidalgo's second blast of the game and season, among five RBI, while Truby added another longball. Biggio, Bagwell, Hidalgo, Berkman and Truby each collected two hits to lead an 8–6 win over Milwaukee. It was the seventh multi-homer game for Hidalgo, whose 5 RBI matched his career high set exactly one year earlier on Opening Day 2000.

By slugging a home run in each of the first three games of the season, Truby established a franchise record. (Note: Equaled the following year by Berkman. At the time, the major league record for home runs in consecutive games to start a season was four, shared by Willie Mays (1971) and Mark McGwire (1998).) Meanwhile, Hidalgo who had concluded the previous season with an active hitting streak which commenced on September 15, collected hits in the first three games of the season to extend to 17 up to April 5.

Right-hander Wade Miller earned NL Pitcher of the Month honors for April. Miller went 4–1 over 5 games, all starts, with one complete game, a 2.15 earned run average (ERA), and 0.929 walks plus hits per inning pitched (WHIP). Over 37 2/3 innings pitched, he surrendered 22 hits, 13 walks, and whiffed 44 batters. Miller became the first Astros hurler to garner the accolade since Randy Johnson in August and September, 1998.

==== May ====
After a back-and-forth skirmish on May 2 with the New York Mets, the Astros finally came back to finish off the contest in 11 innings. Successive home runs from Lance Berkman and Moisés Alou got the Astros to a 6–5 win. Craig Biggio and Daryle Ward also homered for the Astros.

With an infield single on May 4, Biggio realized his 2,000th career hit, doing so at Olympic Stadium. The milestone knock came off Javier Vázquez. Biggio became the first Astro to attain the entirety of his 2,000 hits with the franchise, and the second to attain this career milestone with the club, following José Cruz on September 15, 1985. Biggio later singled aagain and scored ahead of a three-run home by Jeff Bagwell, which capped a four-run fifth frame. Wade Miller (5–1) also collected his first double of the season, while allowing three runs over eight frames to pick the victory. Lance Berkman and Brad Ausmus also doubled, while Daryle Ward and Julio Lugo also homered.

On May 6, right-hander Roy Oswalt made his major league debut at Olympic Stadium, as a relief appearance to close out a 13–7 Astons win over the Montreal Expos. Jeff Bagwell was 4-for-5 with a grand slam and 5 runs batted in (RBI). Bagwell's slam was the fourth of his career, which he hit off Anthony Telford, while the four-ht game was the 23rd of Bagwell's career. Julio Lugo produced his second career five-hit game and scored three runs. Additionally, Hidalgo and Alou homered, and Berkman went 3-for-4 with a triple and a stolen base. Scott Elarton earned the win for Houston in spite of allowing nine hits and six runs over five innings. Mike Jackson and Octavio Dotel followed Elarton with three scoreless innings. Oswalt pitched the ninth and got Vladimir Guerrero for the first strikeout of his career. Next, José Vidro hit a line drive for a single, and former Astro Geoff Blum, who was 4-for-5, doubled to deep left center to score Vidrio. Finally, Oswalt retired Milton Bradley on a ground ball to Bagwell to limit the damage to one run surrendered that day and close out the game. Additionally, Lugo became the seventh Astro to log multiple five-hit bouts. (Note: Number of games in a career player meets criteria, playing for HOU, in the regular season, requiring hits ≥ 5, sorted by descending instances.)

By connecting for a triple on May 7 against the Chicago Cubs, Bagwell achieved the 700th extra base hit of his career.

New acquisition Vinny Castilla slugged his first home run in an Astros uniform on May 15, off Manny Aybar of the Chicago Cubs. Moreover, Castilla and Richard Hidalgo both doubled twice among 10 total extra-base hits for the Astros. In the top of the twelfth inning, pinch hitter Tony Eusebio golfed a two-run home run off Todd Van Poppel deep to center field that scored Castilla for the game-winning runs, 9–7.

Bagwell cranked his fifth career grand slam on May 21, but Ryan Klesko and the San Diego Padres proved too much, winning a 7–6 decision over Houston. Kesko tripled and homered twice, getting 11 total bases. Meanwhile, Berkman was 3-for-6 and a home run shy of hitting for the cycle.

Biggio initiated a hitting streak on May 29 that lasted until June 18, during which he hit .338, and spanned a career-best 18 games. Due to the timing and those later produced by teammates Berkman and Moisés Alou, at least one of the three remained within a current streak until July 18, a span of 45 games. This trio of overlapping hitting streaks mirrored a similar fulfillment that transpired April 17–May 11, 1979. Between those dates, one or more of each of Craig Reynolds, José Cruz, and Enos Cabell piloted their own hitting streak—each had a duration of exactly 15 games.

While tossing six innings with three runs surrendered on May 30, Wade Miller also helped himself at the plate with a 3-for-3 performance to earn his seventh win and lead Houston to a 7–4 win over the Padres. The win also ended an eight-game losing streak that had plunged the Astros below .500.

==== June ====
Richard Hidalgo slugged the walk-off home run and his fourth hit of the night on June 1, in the bottom of the ninth against the Los Angeles Dodgers for Houston's 10–9 win. Hidalgo’s effort was augmented by Vinny Castilla, who collected three hits and a home run.

On June 2, Oswalt logged his first major league hit while batting, a double off Darren Dreifort. This was also Oswalt's first Major League start on the mound, in which he led a 2–1 triumph over Los Angeles at Enron Field. His sacrifice hit during the bottom of the third set up Craig Biggio's single to right field to plate Brad Ausmus for the insurance tally. Oswalt (3–1) surrendered just two hits over six frames, with Adrián Beltré's home run in the fifth as the Dodgers' only score. Billy Wagner whiffed Mark Grudzielanek swinging to decide the contest and register the save (13).

==== Inaugural Lone Star Series ====
The Silver Boot trophy: The Astros played against the Texas Rangers for the first time during the regular season on June 8, 2001, and won, 5–4, beginning the Lone Star Series rivalry.

On June 8, the first-ever interleague game between the Houston Astros and the Texas Rangers took place at The Ballpark at Arlington, initiating the rivalry known as the Lone Star Series. The Astros won the first game by a score of 5–4, on a solo home run in the top of the 11th inning from Alou, installed as the designated hitter. The team that would win the most games between the two in a season would be awarded the Silver Boot.

On June 9, Rangers catcher Iván Rodríguez hit the first grand slam of the Lone Star Series. He connected off right-hander José Lima during the bottom of the third inning, after homering off Kent Bottenfield (2–5) during the first inning. Frank Catalanotto collected four hits while Rubén Sierra homered and tripled as Texas claimed the second contest, 16–4.

On June 10, Orlando Merced stroked a pinch-hit, two-out, three-run home run in the top of the ninth to give the Astros the lead and eventual 6–5 win, which also decided into the Astros winning their first series against the Rangers.

==== Rest of June ====
Berkman crushed his first career grand slam on June 14, from a Héctor Carrasco offering. The blast occurred with two outs in the top of the seventh against the Minnesota Twins. Berkman had four hits and drove in six to key an 8–3 Astros triumph. It was Berkman's third four-hit game of the season, and established a career high in RBI.

Starting June 17, Berkman put together a 21-game hitting streak that would end just after the All-Star break on July 12. He collected 41 hits for a rate of nearly two per game for a dividend batting average of .482. Combined with his uncanny patience and prodigious strength, Berkman's on-base percentage swelled to .541 while his slugging percentage jumped to .941, slamming nine home runs, 10 doubles, and a triple. Moreover, four home runs landed in each of four consecutive contests from June 25–29, just one short of the then-club record amassed by Cliff Johnson from August 19–24, 1975.

As of June 17, the Astros toiled around the .500 mark with a 33–33 record; however, they went on to finish off the season at a 59-36 (.621) pace. The league later announced that Houston would be awarded the site of the 2004 All-Star Game.

Bagwell and Lance Berkman had 4 RBI apiece on June 18 to lead a 13–5 win over the Colorado Rockies, although the Rockies outhit the Astros, 14–12.

The Astros launched five home runs on June 21 against the Cincinnati Reds, but still lost in 11 innings, 8–7. Craig Biggio, Bagwell, Hidalgo and Berkman (twice) all connected for Houston. The Reds hit four home runs. The following game, Alou commenced a 23-game hitting streak and had 2 RBI, though Houston dropped a second-consecutive extra innings contest to Cincinnati, 7–5.

For the week ended June 24, Lance Berkman batted .519 (14-for-27) / .563 on-base percentage (OBP) / .963 slugging percentage (SLG) / 1.525 on-base plus slugging (OPS), six doubles, two home runs, 13 RBI, and 26 total bases. Houston won five of seven games. Berkman was recognized as National League (NL) Player of the Week.

==== July ====
For the second time in his career, Bagwell amassed seven runs batted in (RBI) in a game – the second time he tied the club record – against the Kansas City Royals on July 7. Over four successive games from July 8–13, Bagwell homered and totaled five home runs in that span.

==== Jeff Bagwell's cycle ====
While hosting the St. Louis Cardinals at Enron Field on July 18, Bagwell hit for the cycle. He went 4-for-5 with a BB and five RBI as the Astros won, 17–11. In the second-highest scoring game in the stadium's history, he collected each of the four hits off a different pitcher, including two in the same inning: a single in the first off Mike Matthews, double in the fifth off Luther Hackman, homer in the fifth off Gene Stechschulte and a triple in the seventh off Andy Benes. It was the Astros' first cycle since former teammate Andújar Cedeño at The Astrodome on August 25, 1992, and Biggio hit the next on April 8, 2002. With 11 extra-base hits, the Astros tied the franchise record set the year prior in a game against the Cubs.

The two clubs combined for 14 runs in the fifth inning: St. Louis scored six to erase a 6–2 deficit, and in the bottom of the inning, Houston tallied eight to take the lead for good. Meanwhile, Alou also homered among three hits to extend the 23rd consecutive and final game of his hitting streak, tying Ichiro Suzuki for longest in the majors that year, and tying Art Howe (1981) and Luis Gonzalez (1997) for the-second longest in club history. Teammate Tony Eusebio had hit in 24 consecutive the year prior to establish the club record at the time.

==== Rest of July ====
With an opportunity to extend his hitting streak on the line on July 19, Alou fouled off three pitches during his final at bat in the ninth inning before drawing a walk to close out an 0-for-3 performance, falling one short of the club record. During the streak, Alou stroked 34 hits over 82 at-bats (.415 average). Also, he cranked six homers, six doubles, piling on a staggering 22 RBI, with a stout .707 slugging percentage, and .489 on-base percentage (OBP)l.

On July 20, Orlando Merced, pinch hitting for starter Tim Redding trailing 2–0 during the bottom of the fifth inning, belted a grand slam off Jon Lieber. Three batters later, Craig Biggio sprinted home on a wild pitch. Ron Villone (fifth hold), Octavio Dotel (fourth hold), and Billy Wagner (21st save) each hurled a scoreless outing in relief, preserving the 5–2 lead over the Cubs. Redding (3–0) earned the victory. Dotel whiffed four hitters over two frames. Biggio (23) and Berkman (31) both doubled.

On July 28, Vinny Castilla blasted the eighth three-home run game in club history, while becoming the fifth Houston Astro to do so. (Note: Bagwell had realized the preceding three such outings for Houston, with the latter two arriving in 1999 (April 21 and June 9). Meanwhile, Berkman became the next Astro to connect for three home runs in one contest, on April 16, 2002.) Castilla totaled five RBI on the day, during what was the first bout of the first-ever home day-night doubleheader in Pittsburgh Pirates' club history, the premier campaign at PNC Park, which drew 32,977 patrons. Castilla's massive bout would be upstaged by one Brian Giles, including a fourth inning catch over the left field wall that denied Castilla another home run. Castilla's third home run during the eighth inning led to the Astros scoring twice, and twice more in the ninth, mounting an 8–2 lead. However, the Pirates scored seven times in the bottom of the ninth, capped by Giles' walk-off grand slam off All-Star closer Billy Wagner that assured an 9–8 triumph for the Pirates.

Bagwell was named NL Player of the Month for July after batting .333 with nine HR, breaking his own club record with 36 RBI in a month, exceeding 34 RBI in August 2000. The most recent Astro to receive the monthly accolade was Richard Hidalgo in the previous September, while Bagwell had last won for May 1996. (Note: This was Bagwell's club-record fifth Player of the Month Award.)

==== August ====
While hitting his 32nd HR on August 19, 2001, against Pittsburgh, Bagwell collected his 100th RBI. It was the sixth consecutive season he reached at least 30 HR and 100 RBI, making him the eighth player in MLB history to achieve such a streak, and the only Houston player to do so. Five days later, also against Pittsburgh, he scored his 100th run, joining Jimmie Foxx, Lou Gehrig, and Babe Ruth as the only players in MLB history with six consecutive seasons of 30 homers, 100 RBI and 100 runs scored. On September 30 at Chicago, Bagwell walked for his 100th of the season, thus making him the only player in MLB history register six consecutive seasons of at least 30 HR, 100 RBI, 100 runs scored, and 100 walks.

Starting August 30 to September 18, Oswalt tossed 24 consecutive scoreless innings before yielding a home run at Pacific Bell Park to Andrés Galarraga of the San Francisco Giants.

Oswalt was recognized as the NL Rookie of the Month for August, (Note: First bestowed in 2001.) the first Astro to win this award. Over six outings, all starts, Oswalt was 4–0 with a 1.99 earned run average and two complete games. He worked 45 1/3 innings, surrendered 31 hits, four home runs and five bases on balls, while whiffing 46. He also carried ratios of 0.794 walks plus hits per inning pitched (WHIP) and 9.20 strikeouts to walks (K/BB)

==== September—October ====
Oswalt earned his first major league shutout on September 9, tossing it at home against the Milwuakee Brewers and striking out a career-high 12.

On October 4, Barry Bonds hit his 70th home run of the season off Houston pitcher Wilfredo Rodríguez to tie Mark McGwire's single season home run record.

Having lost seven of their previous eight, on October 7, the Astros commenced the final day of the regular season just one win away from clinching their fourth NL Central division title in five years. Jeff Bagwell and Richard Hidalgo homered as Houston battered former teammate for Darryl Kile for 10 hits and 7 runs over 6 2/3 innings. Meanwhile, Houston starter Shane Reynolds stymied the Cardinals for just one run over 7 1/3 innings as the Astros triumphed, 9–2. The win evened Houston and St. Louis with identical 93–69 records for best in the National League; however, the Astros became the division champions by winning the season series, 9–7, from St. Louis. Reynolds, who picked up his 14th victory of the season, also won the 100th of his career to lead Houston's clinching of the title, and became the first Astro to achieve this milestone since Mike Scott in 1989.

==== Performance overview ====
The Astros received recognition as Organization of the Year by each of SportsTicker, Topps, Baseball America, and Baseball Weekly.

With a 21-game improvement from the year prior, this Astros team set the franchise record for largest year-to-year margin, surpassing the 1997 to 1998 clubs, at 18 games. Having concluded the 2001 season with a 93–69 record, the Astros clinched the best record in the National League, for the second time in club history, and first time since 1980, also with 93 wins. This was the first of five consecutive seasons that the Astros won 84 or more games, establishing a then club-record. The Astros drew 2,904,277 fans, just short of repeating the three-million mark for a second consecutive season. At the time, their 2001 total still qualified as second-highest in club history. The Astros would next draw at least three million in 2004.

Houston claimed their fourth NL Central division title, of a possible seven since the inception of the division in 1994. (Note: No division titles were awarded in 1994 due to the cancellation of that year's playoffs as a response to the players' strike.) This remained the most division titles won by any team in the NL Central until 2005, when St. Louis claimed their fifth. The 2001 NL Central title was also the final division title that the Astros won while still in the National League, until 2017, as members of the American League West. In 2013, the club moved to the American League.

Likewise, with manager Larry Dierker at the helm for each NL Central division title, he extended his club record. Later, A. J. Hinch matched Dierker for most playoff appearances as manager for the Astros, consisting of one American League (AL) Wild Card title (2015) and three AL West division titles (2017, 2018, and 2019).

Lance Berkman established major league records for switch hitters with 94 extra-base hits and doubles (55), (Note: Remained the major league record until Brian Roberts collected 56 in 2009 (American League (AL)), situating Berkman as the NL single-season record-holder. For single seasons, switch-hitter, in the regular season, sorted by descending doubles.) while becoming the 16th major leaguer to swat 55 doubles in one season. (Note: Only Joe Medwick authored more than one such season (1936, 1937). Number of seasons player meets criteria, in the regular season, requiring doubles ≥ 55, sorted by descending instances.) He led the major leagues in doubles, becoming the fifth Astro to headline the National League, and eighth instance overall. Astros antedating Berkman included Rusty Staub (1967), César Cedeño (twice, 1971 and 1972), fellow "Killer B's" Craig Biggio (thrice, 1994, 1998, and 1999) and Jeff Bagwell (1996). Berkman's effort was second in club history to Biggio's 56 in 1999, who preceded Berkman as the 13th player to pound at least 55 doubles.

Having won the Gold Glove Award, Brad Ausmus was named for the first time in his career, as well as becoming Houston's first catcher to receive the award.

Roy Oswalt, who pitched 28 games including 20 starts in total as a first-year major leaguer, turned in a 2.73 earned run average (ERA). With a stellar 14–3 win–loss record, this set the franchise record for wins by a rookie pitcher. Hence, Oswalt was recognized with The Sporting News NL Rookie Pitcher of the Year Award, the third Astros rookie pitcher named accordingly, succeeding Tom Griffin in 1969 and Al Osuna in 1991, and was the seventh Astros rookie overall. (Note: Astros positions players included Joe Morgan (1965), Greg Gross (1974), Jeffrey Leonard (1979), and Bagwell (1991).)

Octavio Dotel established a then-club record for strikeouts by a relief pitcher, whiffing 145 over 105 innings pitched (IP), along with a 2.66 ERA, 7–5 record, and two saves. Billy Wagner, the previous held the team record-holder, did so by fanning 124 in 1999. Dotel became the third reliever in team history to obtain 100 strikeouts, joining Danny Darwin (1989), Xavier Hernandez (1993), and Wagner (1997 and 1999). (Note: For single seasons up to 2001, at least 80% games in relief, playing for HOU, in the regular season, requiring strikeouts ≥ 100, sorted by descending player name.) Dotel's stood as the team record until 2004, when Brad Lidge set a new National League record with 157 strikeouts.

=== League standings ===
==== National League Central ====
NL Central
Team	W	L	Pct.	GB	Home	Road
Houston Astros	93	69	.574	—	44‍–‍37	49‍–‍32
St. Louis Cardinals	93	69	.574	—	54‍–‍28	39‍–‍41
Chicago Cubs	88	74	.543	5	48‍–‍33	40‍–‍41
Milwaukee Brewers	68	94	.420	25	36‍–‍45	32‍–‍49
Cincinnati Reds	66	96	.407	27	27‍–‍54	39‍–‍42
Pittsburgh Pirates	62	100	.383	31	38‍–‍43	24‍–‍57

==== Record versus opponents ====
National League

2001 National League record Source: MLB Standings Grid – 2001
Team	AZ	ATL	CHC	CIN	COL	FLA	HOU	LAD	MIL	MON	NYM	PHI	PIT	SD	SF	STL	AL
Arizona	—	5–2	6–3	5–1	13–6	4–2	2–4	10–9	3–3	3–3	3–3	3–4	4–2	12–7	10–9	2–4	7–8
Atlanta	2–5	—	4–2	4–2	4–2	9–10	3–3	2–5	3–3	13–6	10–9	10–9	5–1	3–3	4–2	3–3	9–9
Chicago	3–6	2–4	—	13–4	3–3	3–3	8–9	4–2	8–9	3–3	4–2	4–2	10–6	2–4	3–3	9–8	9–6
Cincinnati	1–5	2–4	4–13	—	3–6	4–2	6–11	4–2	6–10	4–2	4–2	2–4	9–8	2–4	4–2	7–10	4–11
Colorado	6–13	2–4	3–3	6–3	—	4–2	2–4	8–11	5–1	3–4	4–3	2–4	2–4	9–10	9–10	6–3	2–10
Florida	2–4	10–9	3–3	2–4	2–4	—	3–3	2–5	4–2	12–7	7–12	5–14	4–2	3–4	2–4	3–3	12–6
Houston	4–2	3–3	9–8	11–6	4–2	3–3	—	2–4	12–5	6–0	3–3	3–3	9–8	3–6	3–3	9–7	9–6
Los Angeles	9–10	5–2	2–4	2–4	11–8	5–2	4–2	—	5–1	2–4	2–4	3–3	7–2	9–10	11–8	3–3	6–9
Milwaukee	3–3	3–3	9–8	10–6	1–5	2–4	5–12	1–5	—	4–2	3–3	3–3	6–11	1–5	5–4	7–10	5–10
Montreal	3–3	6–13	3–3	2–4	4–3	7–12	0–6	4–2	2–4	—	8–11	9–10	5–1	3–3	2–5	2–4	8–10
New York	3–3	9–10	2–4	2–4	3–4	12–7	3–3	4–2	3–3	11–8	—	11–8	4–2	1–5	3–4	1–5	10–8
Philadelphia	4–3	9–10	2–4	4–2	4–2	14–5	3–3	3–3	3–3	10–9	8–11	—	5–1	5–2	3–3	2–4	7–11
Pittsburgh	2–4	1–5	6–10	8–9	4–2	2–4	8–9	2–7	11–6	1–5	2–4	1–5	—	2–4	1–5	3–14	8–7
San Diego	7–12	3–3	4–2	4–2	10–9	4–3	6–3	10–9	5–1	3–3	5–1	2–5	4–2	—	5–14	1–5	6–9
San Francisco	9–10	2–4	3–3	2–4	10–9	4–2	3–3	8–11	4–5	5–2	4–3	3–3	5–1	14–5	—	4–2	10–5
St. Louis	4–2	3–3	8–9	10–7	3–6	3–3	7–9	3–3	10–7	4–2	5–1	4–2	14–3	5–1	2–4	—	8–7

=== Transactions ===
- July 9, 2001: Charlie Hayes was released by the Houston Astros.

=== Roster ===
2001 Houston Astros
Roster
Pitchers: 27 Pedro Astacio; 47 Kent Bottenfield; 41 Nelson Cruz; 29 Octavio Dotel; 50 Scott Elarton; 53 Wayne Franklin; 55 Carlos Hernández; 38 Mike Jackson; 42 José Lima; 36 Scott Linebrink; 58 Jim Mann; 59 Tony McKnight; 52 Wade Miller; 23 Dave Mlicki; 44 Roy Oswalt; 45 Brian Powell; 39 Jay Powell; 51 Tim Redding; 37 Shane Reynolds; 45,66 Wilfredo Rodríguez; 58 Joe Slusarski; 35 Ricky Stone; 39 Ron Villone; 13 Billy Wagner; 43 Mike Williams	Catchers: 11 Brad Ausmus; 20 Tony Eusebio; 21 Scott Servais; Infielders: 5 Jeff Bagwell; 7 Craig Biggio; 19 Vinny Castilla; 3 Adam Everett; 14 Charlie Hayes; 22 Mendy López; 4 Julio Lugo; 6 Chris Truby; 10 José Vizcaíno	Outfielders: 18 Moisés Alou; 24 Glen Barker; 17 Lance Berkman; 15 Richard Hidalgo; 16 Orlando Merced; 31 Daryle Ward; Other batters: 1 Keith Ginter; 28 Bill Spiers	Manager: 49 Larry Dierker; Coaches: 25 José Cruz (first base); 9 Mike Cubbage (third base); 8 Matt Galante (bench); 48 Burt Hooton (pitching); 12 Harry Spilman (hitting); 30 John Tamargo (bullpen)

== Major League Baseball draft ==
Houston Astros 2001 MLB draft selections
Rd.	Slot	Draftee	Position	School	Origin	Signed	Notes	Bio
1	10	Chris Burke	Second baseman	Tennessee	(Kentucky)	Y	(Note: MLB debut on July 4, 2004 for Houston)	
2	54	Mike Rodríguez	Outfielder	Miami • 2001	(Florida)	Y		
3	86	Kirk Saarloos	Right-handed pitcher	Cal State Fullerton • 2001	(California)	Y	(Note: MLB debut on June 18, 2002 for Houston)	
4	116	Philip Barzilla	Left-handed pitcher	Rice	(Texas)	Y	(Note: MLB debut on June 11, 2006 for Houston)	
5	146	Charlton Jimerson	Outfielder	Miami • 2001	(California)	Y	(Note: MLB debut on September 14, 2005 for Houston)	

== Player statistics ==
Table legend
League leader (Bold: MLB leader)	Team leader	*	Left-handed batter or pitcher
League top ten	Leader in appearances at position	#	Switch hitter

=== Batting ===
Abbreviations key

- ⌖ — primary position
- G — games played
- AB — at bats
- R — Runs
- H — hits
- 2B — doubles
- HR — home runs
- RBI — runs batted in
- SB — stolen bases
- BB — base on balls
- SO — strikeouts
- TB — total bases
- AVG — batting average
- OBP — on-base percentage
- SLG — slugging percentage
- OPS — on-base plus slugging

==== Starters by position ====
Regular season batting results
⌖	Player	G	AB	R	H	2B	HR	RBI	SB	BB	SO	AVG	OBP	SLG
C	Brad Ausmus	128	422	45	98	23	5	34	4	30	64	.232	.284	.341
1B	Jeff Bagwell	161	600	126	173	43	39	130	11	106	135	.288	.397	.568
2B	Craig Biggio	155	617	118	180	35	20	70	7	66	100	.292	.382	.455
3B	Vinny Castilla	122	445	62	120	28	23	82	1	32	86	.270	.320	.492
SS	Julio Lugo	140	513	93	135	20	10	37	12	46	116	.263	.326	.372
LF	Lance Berkman^{#}	156	577	110	191	**55**	34	126	7	92	121	.331	.430	.620
CF	Richard Hidalgo	146	512	70	141	29	19	80	3	54	107	.275	.356	.455
RF	Moisés Alou	136	513	79	170	31	27	108	4	57	57	.331	.396	.554

==== Other batters ====
Player	G	AB	H	Avg.	HR	RBI
José Vizcaíno^{#}	107	256	71	.277	1	14
Daryle Ward*	95	213	56	.263	9	39
Tony Eusebio	59	154	39	.253	5	14
Orlando Merced^{#}	94	137	36	.263	6	29
Chris Truby	48	136	28	.206	8	23
Charlie Hayes	31	50	10	.200	0	4
Glen Barker^{#}	70	24	2	.083	0	1
Scott Servais	11	16	6	.375	0	0
Mendy López	10	15	4	.267	1	3
Bill Spiers*	4	3	1	.333	0	0
Adam Everett	9	3	0	.000	0	0
Keith Ginter	1	1	0	.000	0	0

=== Pitching ===
==== Starting pitchers ====
Note: G = Games pitched; IP = Innings pitched; W = Wins; L = Losses; ERA = Earned run average; SO = Strikeouts

Player	G	IP	W	L	ERA	SO
Wade Miller	32	212.0	16	8	3.40	183
Shane Reynolds	28	182.2	14	11	4.34	102
Roy Oswalt	28	141.2	14	3	2.73	144
Scott Elarton	20	109.2	4	8	7.14	76
Pedro Astacio	4	28.2	2	1	3.14	19
Tony McKnight	3	18.0	1	0	4.00	10
Carlos Hernández	3	17.2	1	0	1.02	17
Brian Powell	1	3.0	0	1	18.00	3

==== Other pitchers ====
Note: G = Games pitched; IP = Innings pitched; W = Wins; L = Losses; ERA = Earned run average; SO = Strikeouts

Player	G	IP	W	L	ERA	SO
Dave Mlicki	19	86.2	7	3	5.09	49
Ron Villone	31	68.0	5	7	5.56	65
Tim Redding	13	55.2	3	1	5.50	55
José Lima	14	53.0	1	2	7.30	41
Kent Bottenfield	13	52.0	2	5	6.40	39

==== Relief pitchers ====
Note: G = Games pitched; W = Wins; L = Losses; SV = Saves; ERA = Earned run average; SO = Strikeouts

Player	G	W	L	SV	ERA	SO
Billy Wagner	64	2	5	39	2.73	79
Mike Jackson	67	5	3	4	4.70	46
Nelson Cruz	66	3	3	2	4.15	75
Octavio Dotel	61	7	5	2	2.66	145
Jay Powell	35	2	2	0	3.72	28
Mike Williams	25	4	0	0	4.03	16
Wayne Franklin	11	0	0	0	6.75	9
Scott Linebrink	9	0	0	0	2.61	9
Joe Slusarski	8	0	1	0	9.00	6
Ricky Stone	6	0	0	0	2.35	4
Jim Mann	4	0	0	0	3.38	5
Wilfredo Rodríguez	2	0	0	0	15.00	3

== National League Divisional Playoffs ==
=== Houston Astros vs. Atlanta Braves ===
Atlanta wins the series, 3-0

Game	Home	Score	Visitor	Score	Date	Series
1	Houston	4	Atlanta	7	October 9	1-0 (ATL)
2	Houston	0	Atlanta	1	October 10	2-0 (ATL)
3	Atlanta	6	Houston	2	October 12	3-0 (ATL)

== Awards and achievements ==
=== Grand slams ===
No.	Date	Astros batter	Venue	Inning	Pitcher	Opposing team	Box
1	April 3 (Note: Opening Day)	Daryle Ward (Note: 1st MLB grand slam)	Enron Field	3	Jimmy Haynes	Milwaukee Brewers	
2	April 27	Julio Lugo	Enron Field	4 (Note: Tied score or took lead)	Brad Penny	Florida Marlins	
3	May 6	Jeff Bagwell	Olympic Stadium	6	Anthony Telford	Montreal Expos	
4	May 21	Jeff Bagwell	Enron Field	3	Adam Eaton	San Diego Padres	
5	June 3	Vinny Castilla	Enron Field	3	Éric Gagné	Los Angeles Dodgers	
6	June 14	Lance Berkman	Hubert H. Humphrey Metrodome	7	Héctor Carrasco	Minnesota Twins	
7	July 20	Orlando Merced (Note: Pinch hitter)	Enron Field	5	Jon Lieber	Chicago Cubs	

=== Career honors ===
- Houston Baseball Writers Lifetime Achievement Award: Craig F. Cullinan Jr.

=== Annual awards ===
2001 Houston Astros award winners
Name of award		Recipient	Ref.
Baseball America	Organization of the Year	Houston Astros	
Baseball Digest Rookie All-Star	Starting pitcher	Roy Oswalt	
Fred Hartman Award for Long and Meritorious Service to Baseball		Wayne Graham	
Gold Glove Award	Catcher	Brad Ausmus	
Houston-Area Major League Player of the Year	NYY	Roger Clemens	
Houston Astros	Most Valuable Player (MVP)	Lance Berkman	
Houston Astros	Pitcher of the Year	Wade Miller	
Houston Astros	Rookie of the Year	Roy Oswalt	
MLB All-Star Game	Reserve outfielder	Moisés Alou	
MLB All-Star Game	Reserve outfielder	Lance Berkman	
MLB All-Star Game	Reserve pitcher	Billy Wagner	
National League (NL) Pitcher of the Month	April	Wade Miller	
National League (NL) Player of the Month	July	Jeff Bagwell	
National League (NL) Player of the Week	June 24	Lance Berkman (Note: Co-winner with Luis Gonzalez of the Arizona Diamondbacks.)	
National League (NL) Rookie of the Month	August	Roy Oswalt	
The Sporting News NL Rookie Pitcher of the Year:		Roy Oswalt	
Topps All-Star Rookie Team	Right-handed pitcher	Roy Oswalt	

Other awards results

Name of award	Voting recipient(s) (Team)	Ref.
NL Cy Young	1st—R. Johnson (ARI) • 5th—Oswalt (HOU)	
NL Most Valuable Player	1st—Bonds (SFG) • 5th—Berkman (HOU) • 7th—Bagwell (HOU); Other Astros: 14th—Alou • 22nd—Oswalt	
NL Manager of the Year	1st—Bowa (PHI) • 5th—Dierker (HOU)	
NL Rookie of the Year	1st—Pujols (STL) • 2nd—Oswalt (HOU)	

=== League leaders ===
NL batting leaders

- Doubles: Lance Berkman (55—led MLB)
- Hit by pitch: Craig Biggio (28—led MLB)

NL pitching leaders

- Winning percentage: Roy Oswalt (.824)

=== Milestones ===
==== Major League debuts ====
Player—Appeared at position

- Roy Oswalt, relief pitcher
Date and opponent

- May 6 at Montreal
Box

Also:

== Minor league system ==
Level	Team	League	Manager
AAA	New Orleans Zephyrs	Pacific Coast League	Tony Peña
AA	Round Rock Express	Texas League	Jackie Moore
A	Michigan Battle Cats	Midwest League	John Massarelli
A	Lexington Legends	South Atlantic League	Joe Cannon
A-Short Season	Pittsfield Astros	New York–Penn League	Iván DeJesús
Rookie	Martinsville Astros	Appalachian League	Jorge Orta

=== Championships ===
- Pacific Coast League champions: New Orleans (Note: Co-champions with the Tacoma Rainiers.)
- South Atlantic League champions: Lexington (Note: Co-champions with the Asheville Tourists.)

=== Awards ===
- All-Star Futures Game—Outfielder: Jason Lane
- Double-A All-Star Team:
  - Outfielder: Jason Lane
  - Pitcher: Tim Redding
- Houston Astros Minor League Player of the Year: Jason Lane
- Pacific Coast League All-Star: Jim Mann, RHP
- Texas League All-Star:
  - Second baseman: Dave Matranga
  - Outfielder: Jason Lane
  - Pitcher: Carlos Hernández
  - Pitcher: Tim Redding
- Texas League Most Valuable Player Award (MVP): Jason Lane, OF
- Texas League Pitcher of the Year: Tim Redding, RHP
- Triple-A All-Star Team—Pitcher: Jim Mann

=== Summary ===
==== Lexington Legends' combined no-hitter ====
On July 30, 2001, Derek Stanford, Chris George and Kirk Saarloos pitched a combined no-hitter for the Lexington Legends, an expansion team in their inaugural season. Saarloos was Houston's third-round amateur draftee during the preceding month.

== See also ==
- List of Major League Baseball annual doubles leaders
- List of Major League Baseball career hits leaders
- List of Major League Baseball doubles records
- List of Major League Baseball franchise postseason streaks
- List of Major League Baseball players to hit for the cycle
- List of Major League Baseball postseason sweeps
- List of Major League Baseball tie-breakers
