= 2002 Houston Astros season =

41st season in Major League Baseball for the Houston Astros

2002 Houston Astros
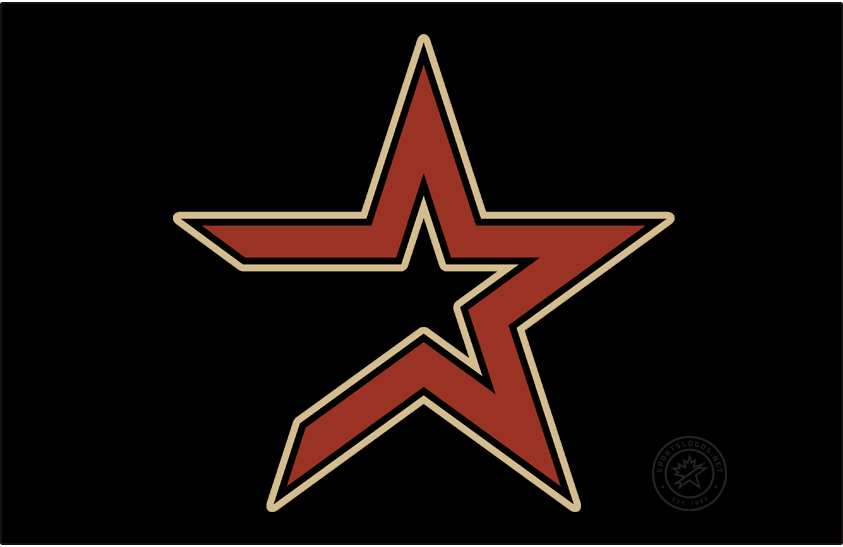
- League: National League
- Division: Central
- Ballpark: Astros Field
- City: Houston, Texas
- Record: 84–78 (.519)
- Divisional place: 2nd
- Owners: Drayton McLane, Jr.
- General managers: Gerry Hunsicker
- Managers: Jimy Williams
- Television: KNWS-TV; FSN Southwest (Bill Brown, Jim Deshaies, Bill Worrell)
- Radio: KTRH (Milo Hamilton, Alan Ashby); KXYZ (Francisco Ernesto Ruiz, Alex Treviño)

The 2002 Houston Astros season was the 41st season for the Major League Baseball (MLB) franchise located in Houston, Texas, their 38th as the Astros, 41st in the National League (NL), ninth in the NL Central division, and third at Astros Park, renamed Minute Maid Park during the season. The Astros entered the season as defending NL Central division champions for the fourth time with a 93–69 record; however, their season ended in defeat in the National League Division Series (NLDS) to the Atlanta Braves for the third time.

The 2002 season was the first for Jimy Williams as manager, the 15th in franchise history, having replaced Larry Dierker. Opening Day for Houston occurred on April 2 in which they hosted the Milwaukee Brewers, who won, 9–3. Wade Miller was the Astros' Opening Day starting pitcher. On April 8, Craig Biggio became the fifth player and on the sixth occasion in franchise history to hit for the cycle.

Dierker, having pitched for Colt .45s/Astros for 13 seasons, broadcast for 18, and managed the club for another five, had his uniform number retired by the club on May 19. Likewise, other Houston broadcasters, Harry Kalas (Ford C. Frick Award), and René Cárdenas (Hispanic Heritage Baseball Hall of Fame inductee) were honored for their career impact.

The Astros' first-round draft pick in the amateur draft was pitcher Derick Grigsby, 29th overall. On June 5, the Astros announced a new agreement reached with Minute Maid for the naming rights to their stadium, rebranding it from Astros Field to Minute Maid Park.

Outfielder Lance Berkman represented the Astros and played for the National League at the MLB All-Star Game, his second career selection.

Berkman became the second Astro to lead the league in runs batted in (RBI), collecting 128.

The Astros concluded the season with an 84–78 record, in second place in the NL Central division, and 13 games behind the St. Louis Cardinals. The Astros ranked third in the NL Wild Card race, trailing the eventual NL-champion San Francisco Giants by 11 1/2 games. However, this was the ninth winning season in the previous 10 for Houston—with 2000 being the exception—continuing an unprecedented period of success. Additionally, it was the eighth time in nine seasons since moving to the NL Central that the Astros had finished in either first or second place.

Following the season, catcher Brad Ausmus won the second Gold Glove Award of his career.

== Offseason ==
=== Summary ===
The Astros concluded the 2001 campaign as National League (NL) Central division champions with a 93–69 (.574) record. They tied with division rivals St. Louis Cardinals for top record in the National League but retained the tie-breaker to obtain the number-one seed. This was Houston's fourth division title in the NL Central division—and fourth in five campaigns—and seventh division title in franchise history. Jeff Bagwell extended his major league record with six consecutive seasons in which he accumulated each of a minimum of 100 runs scored, 30 doubles, 30 home runs, 100 runs batted in (RBI) and 100 base on balls (BB).. (Note: Just four other players had produced six or more total seasons meeting each of the criteria: Lou Gehrig (8); and Babe Ruth, Ted Williams, and Barry Bonds (6 each). Filtered for: Number of seasons player meets criteria, in the regular season: Requiring runs ≥ 100, doubles ≥ 30, home runs ≥ 30, runs batted in ≥ 100 and bases on balls ≥ 100, sorted by descending instances.) Meanwhile, Lance Berkman, having produced 55 doubles and 34 home runs in 2001, became the first switch hitter to hit 50 doubles and 30 home runs during the same season and thirteenth Major Leaguer overall.

=== Transactions ===
- December 11, 2001: Gregg Zaun signed as a free agent with the Houston Astros.

== Regular season ==
=== Summary ===
==== April—May ====
Opening Day starting lineup
Uniform	Player	Position
7	Craig Biggio	Second baseman
2	Gregg Zaun	Catcher
5	Jeff Bagwell	First baseman
17	Lance Berkman	Center fielder
15	Richard Hidalgo	Right fielder
31	Daryle Ward	Left fielder
14	Morgan Ensberg	Third baseman
28	Adam Everett	Shortstop
52	Wade Miller	Pitcher
Venue: Astros Field • Final: Milwaukee 9, Houston 3 Sources:

Craig Biggio extended his club-record 14th Opening Day start. The Milwaukee Brewers routed Houston, 9 to 3. Both teams recorded 12 safeties, but the Astros struck out 13 times, left 11 runners on base, and went 2-for-10 with runners in scoring position. Ben Sheets stymied the Astros' offense over six frames, while Wade Miley was torched for seven runs over four innings.

With his third home run of the season on April 5, Lance Berkman equaled a club record entrenched by Chris Truby the year prior by homering in each in the season's first three contests. (Note: At the time, the major league record for home runs in consecutive games to start a season was four, shared by Willie Mays (1971) and Mark McGwire (1998).) Berkman's performance led a 6–3 win at Astros Field over Milwakee.

On April 7, Daryle Ward connected on a Luther Hackman offering for a walk-off home run, for a 7–6 decision over the St. Louis Cardinals in the bottom of the 12th inning. This was the Astros' first walk-off hit of the season.

==== Craig Biggio's cycle ====
On April 8 versus the Colorado Rockies, second baseman Craig Biggio became the fifth Houston Astro to hit for the cycle, and sixth time in franchise history. He singled, then tripled and connected for a home run off starter Denny Neagle within the first four innings. In the sixth, Neagle issued an intentional base on balls to Biggio, but Biggio, batting again in the eighth, stroked a double to complete the cycle. When his son, Cavan, replicated the feat in 2019 as a member of the Toronto Blue Jays, they became the second father–son duo in major league history to hit for the cycle, following Gary (1980) and Daryle Ward (2004) The younger Ward and elder Biggio were teammates when Craig hit for the cycle (though not in the starting lineup together); in fact, Ward was a member of the Astros in his first five major league seasons, from 1998—2002.

==== Rest of April ====
Berkman slugged three home runs at Cinergy Field on April 16 to ignite an 8–3 Astros win over the Cincinnati Reds, the first three-home run game of Berkman's career. The first two shots were courtesy of José Acevedo offerings during the first and second innings, and the third was off José Rijo. Moreover, the Astros chased Acevedo early with seven runs during the first two innings as Jeff Bagwell and Richard Hidalgo also went deep off the Reds starter. Dave Mlicki tossed 7 2/3 innings pitched with six strikeouts and one run surrendered to pick up his first win of the season. Berkman had two additional opportunities to make major league history with a fourth home run but wound up short. The ninth time three-home run game in club history, it was the first since Vinny Castilla did so on July 28, 2001, and was succeeded by Hidalgo's on September 16, 2003. and remained as the only such contest of Berkman's career. Berkman delivered five runs batted in (RBi) to establish a season-high.

On April 26, reliever Brad Lidge made his major league debut, tossing two innings versus the Atlanta Braves. He allowed two runs and struck out three.

==== May ====
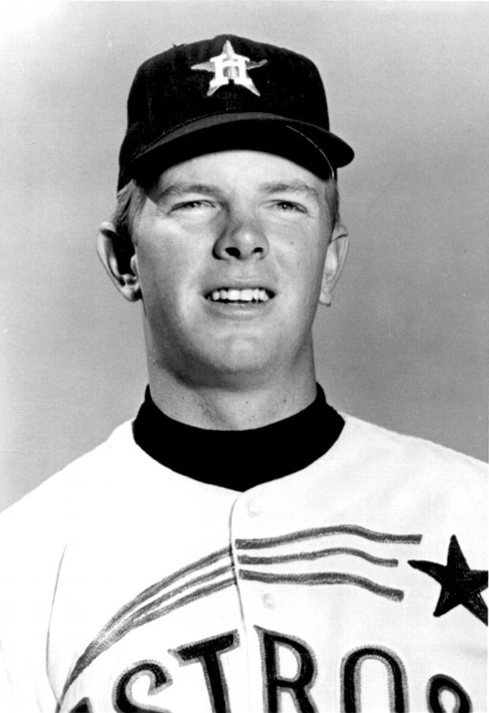
Larry Dierker in a 1966 photocard.

During the week of April 28 to May 5, Lance Berkman batted .423 / .516 on-base percentage (OBP) / .846 slugging percentage (SLG) / 1.362 on-base plus slugging (OPS), 3 home runs, 9 RBI, 11 hits, and 22 total bases. He was thus recognized as National League (NL) Player of the Week.

On May 10, Jason Lane made his major league debut, becoming the 18,000th player in major league history. He took one at bat versus the Pittsburgh Pirates

The Astros erupted for a season-high in runs on May 13, for a 17–3 rout of the Philadelphia Phillies at Astros Field. Led by third baseman Geoff Blum's game-high three doubles and five RBI, the Astros piled on 10 extra-base hits among 20 total hits and four bases on balls, with two doubles by Hidalgo and a triple from Julio Lugo. Blum reached base four times, including earning a walk. Tim Redding (2–2) yielded just one run over seven innings to earn the victory.

Hosting the Pittsburgh Pirates on May 18, starters Kris Benson and Tim Redding exchanged pitching duels for seven innings each. Deadlocked 1–1 going into the bottom of the ninth, José Vizcaíno blasted a Sean Lowe delivery for a one-out walk-off home run to ice a 2–1 Houston triumph. This triumph pulled the Astros back to the .500 mark and into a second-place tie in the division, while extending a season-high seven-game winning streak.

The Astros retired Larry Dierker's uniform number 49 on May 19 during a pre-game ceremony at Astros field.

==== June ====
Accompanied with a celebration of fireworks and a locomotive steaming across the tracks beyond the left field wall carting oranges, on June 5, the Astros rechristened their stadium as Minute Maid Park. The organization announced a naming rights deal they had reached with Minute Maid, a beverage company based in Sugar Land, a suburb of Houston, since 1960. Per owner Drayton McLane, the agreement covered 28 years and was worth $100 million. The Astros had also considered proposals from other Houston-area companies, including Conoco Inc., Landry's Seafood Restaurants Inc., and Gallery Furniture.

Right-handed pitcher Shane Reynolds was placed on the 15-day disabled list on June 13 to undergo a season-ending microdiscectomy procedure to remove disc fragments in his back that were pressing on nerve. Reynolds' season ended after 13 starts, after going 3–6 and having posted a 4.86 earned run average (ERA).

On June 16, Craig Biggio connected for his 12th career walk-off hit, a single off John Rocker that secured a 7–6 triumph over the Texas Rangers in hte bottom of the ninth inning. Biggio passed Phil Garner for second-most walk-off hits in Astros history, and one behind José Cruz] (13) for the all-time franchise lead.

On June 20, Lance Berkman's grand slam (22) capped a seven-run fourth inning at Miller Park, as Houston toppled the Milwaukeee Brewers, 9–3. Wade Miller (3–2) cruised through six innings to earn the win, scattering seven hits and three walks. Berkmam's 5 RBI augmented his league-leading total to 62.

Former Astros pitcher Darryl Kile, then playing for the St. Louis Cardinals, was found dead in his Chicago hotel room on June 22, 2002. That same day, the bereaved Astros won in his memory against the Seattle Mariners, with first baseman Jeff Bagwell delivering the game-winning run batted in (RBI) in the 12th inning.

Inserted to pinch hit on June 27, Gregg Zaun had the bases loaded in the bottom of the ninth inning and connected for the walk-off grand slam, sealing a 7–4 win over the Arizona Diamondbacks. Lance Berkman (23) and Brad Ausmus (3) also belted home runs for Houston. Octavio Dotel (4–3) secured the final two frames to earn the victory. Zaun became just the second pinch-hitter in club history to hit a walk-off grand slam for Houston, joining Milt May on May 22, 1974, (Note: The next pinch hitter to connect for a walk-off grand slam for Houston was Brian Bogusevic, on August 16, 2011, which was also an ultimate grand slam.) and sixth walk-off grand slam by any batter in team history, Kevin Bass on August 20, 1989. (Note: Five years plus one day later, Carlos Lee launched the next walk-off grand slam by an Astros hitter on June 28, 2007.)

==== July ====
Lance Berkman was selected to play in his second MLB All-Star Game, during which he collected his first two RBI at the Midsummer Classic. During the bottom of the seventh inning, he pinch hit for Todd Helton and delivered a two-run single to score Mike Lowell and Damian Miller to place the National League ahead of the American League (AL), 7–6. The AL rallied to tie the contest, 7–7, which was the final score after 11 innings. Berkman was also a contestant in the Home Run Derby, placing last with one home run hit.

On July 25, Kirk Saarloos tossed his first career shutout, scattering six hits with no walks issued. Saarloos struck out six.

For the month of July, Kirk Saarloos won all three games (all starts) in which he appeared, with a 1.77 earned run average (ERA), one complete game shutout, and 0.836 walks plus hits per inning pitched (WHIP). In 20 1/3 innings pitched, Saarloos fanned 14 and surrendered just 16 hits and one walk. Thus, Saarloos was recognized as NL Rookie of the Month. He became the second Astro so named, following Roy Oswalt in August 2001.

==== August ====
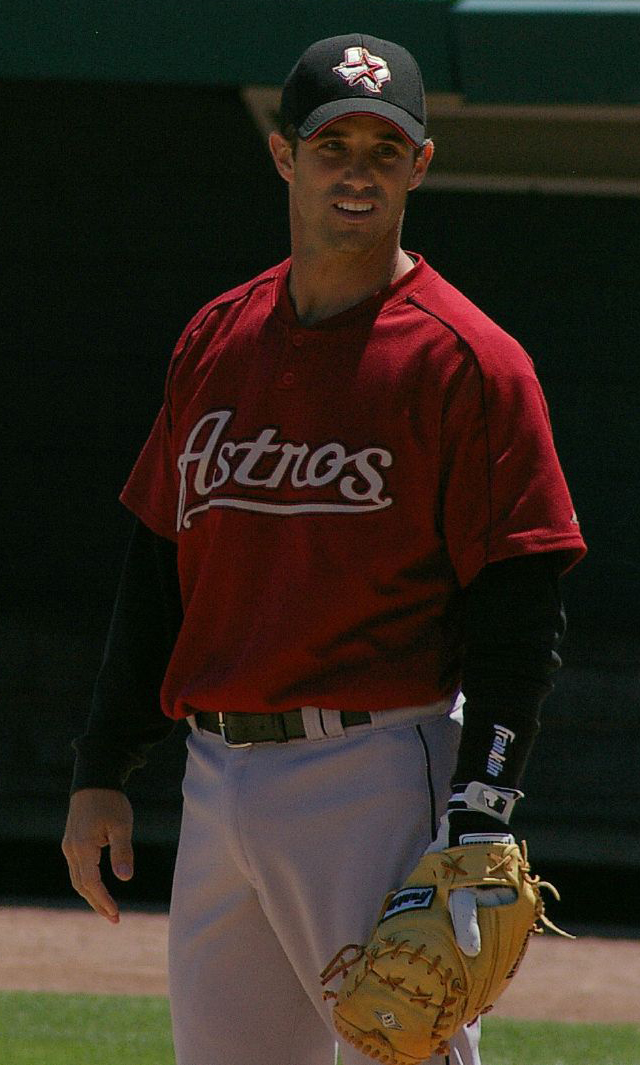
Catcher Brad Ausmus won his second Gold Glove Award in 2002.

From August 10–24, Bagwell produced a season-high 15-game hitting streak, marking the 12th consecutive season with at least one double-digit hit streak, a club record, and second to Roberto Alomar with 14 among all then-active players. In September, Bagwell batted .343 with 11 multi-hit games.

On August 12, Julio Lugo sustained a fractured left forearm fracture on a hit by pitch from Kerry Wood from the Chicago Cubs, ending Lugo's season. The Astros recalled shortstop Adam Everett from Triple-A New Orleans to take his place.

Prior a contest against the San Diego Padres on August 27, Bagwell met with 11-year-old bone cancer patient named Stephen Rael, who asked him to hit a home run for him. Bagwell replied, "I'm going to try, but I'm not Babe Ruth." In the fifth inning, he hit a pitch from Mike Bynum over the left field wall. Bagwell pointed to the child in the stands as he rounded third base. Bagwell later commented, "I hit the home run, and he felt it was for him. I'm glad for that. It made it special."

During the month of August, Roy Oswalt won all six of his starts to go with a 1.22 ERA over 44 1/3 innings pitched. He surrendered a .184 batting average against and 0.880 walks plus hits per inning pitched (WHIP) while striking out 28. Thus, the hurler was recognized as NL Pitcher of the Month for the first time, and the first Astro to win the award since Wade Miller in April of the previous season. Moreover, Oswalt's Pitcher of the Month Award was one year removed from winning Rookie of the Month the previous August.

==== September ====
On September 9, Jason Lane cranked his first major league home run, a three-run blast in the fourth inning to left field off former Astro Mike Hampton. It also started the Astros' comeback, cutting their deficit from 0-to-4 to 3-to-4 to the Colorado Rockies. Two batters later, Geoff Blum (9) homered to tie the score. The Rockies scored in the top of the fifth to retake the lead, but Richard Hidalgo's double (17) bottom of the sixth retied the score. The game proceeded to into extra innings, until during the bottom of the 10th, Mark Loretta singled home Craig Biggio to seal a walk-off, 6–5 Astros win. Meanwhile, Brad Lidge (1–0) tossed a scoreless top of tenth in which yielded a single to Larry Walker, around striking out the side, to obtain his first major league victory.

On September 15, Berkman slugged his 100th career home run, launching an offering from Matt Morris of the st. Louis Cardinals deep to left field in the bottom of the fourth inning at Minute Maid Park.

On September 18, Brad Lidge made his only major league start, Lidge hurled three scoreless innings and struck out four, helping to spearhead a 3–1 victory over the Milwaukeee Brewers. He departed to a 3–0 lead after hitting an RBI single to score fellow rookie Jason Lane—his second RBI. During this at bat, Lidge pulled an oblique muscle, ending another professional season due to injury. A starter in the minor leagues, four seasons had also ended early on account of injury. Following the game, catcher Brad Ausmus recommended to Lddge that he abandon the changeup, and transition to the bullpen to leverage use of "the fastball and slider, to be a pretty dang-good end-of-the-game type guy.”

==== Performance overview ====
With an 84–78 record, the 2002 season was the second of six consecutive with a winning record, through the 2006 campaign. At the time, this signified the second-longest such in club history. They had also agglomerated 84 wins or more and qualified for the playoffs in five of each of the six prior seasons (with 2000 being the exception) and continued to win 84 or more through 2005.

Lance Berkman led the NL in runs batted in (RBI) with 128, joining Bagwell in 1994 as the second Houston Astro to accomplish this feat. Further, Berkman also became the fifth switch hitter in the major leagues to belt 40 or more home runs in the same season. (Note: Prior to Berkman were Mickey Mantle (1956, 1958, 1960, and 1961), Todd Hundley (1996), Ken Caminiti (1996), and Chipper Jones (1999).) Named the Astros' team Most Valuable Player (MVP) for the second consecutive season, Berkman also succeeded Bagwell in claiming two straight team MVPs (1999–2000). Berkman became the fifth player in club history to earn this distinction, while serving as the club's primary center fielder and leading the club in numerous offensive categories.

Bagwell drew 100 or more bases on balls for the seventh continuous season, which tied Mel Ott (1936–1942) for the National League record. Frank Thomas (eight consecutive, 1991–1998, in the American League) harbored the major league record. In 2005, former Astro Bobby Abreu tied Ott and Bagwell for the National League record.

Catcher Brad Ausmus was rewarded with his second consecutive Gold Glove, the first Astro since Biggio to win the Gold Glove over successive campaigns (1994–1997, all at second base). Ausmus also joined Doug Rader (1970–1974 at third base), César Cedeño (1972–1976 at outfield), and Biggio as the fourth Astro to both win multiple Gold Gloves, while being recognized over consecutive seasons.

=== League standings ===
==== National League Central ====
NL Central
Team	W	L	Pct.	GB	Home	Road
St. Louis Cardinals	97	65	.599	—	52‍–‍29	45‍–‍36
Houston Astros	84	78	.519	13	47‍–‍34	37‍–‍44
Cincinnati Reds	78	84	.481	19	38‍–‍43	40‍–‍41
Pittsburgh Pirates	72	89	.447	24½	38‍–‍42	34‍–‍47
Chicago Cubs	67	95	.414	30	36‍–‍45	31‍–‍50
Milwaukee Brewers	56	106	.346	41	31‍–‍50	25‍–‍56

==== Record versus opponents ====
National League

2002 National League record Source: MLB Standings Grid – 2002
Team	AZ	ATL	CHC	CIN	COL	FLA	HOU	LAD	MIL	MON	NYM	PHI	PIT	SD	SF	STL	AL
Arizona	—	3–3	4–2	6–0	14–5	5–1	3–3	9–10	4–2	4–2	5–2	4–3	4–2	12–7	8–11	2–4	11–7
Atlanta	3–3	—	4–2	4–2	4–3	11–8	3–3	2–4	5–1	13–6	12–7	11–7	3–3	3–3	3–3–1	5–1	15–3
Chicago	2–4	2–4	—	5–12	4–2	4–2	8–11	2–4	7–10	3–3	1–5	2–4	10–9	2–4	3–3	6–12	6–6
Cincinnati	0–6	2–4	12–5	—	3–3	5–1	6–11	4–2	13–6	1–5	2–4	2–4	11–7	5–1	2–4	8–11	2–10
Colorado	5–14	3–4	2–4	3–3	—	5–2	3–3	7–12	3–3	4–2	3–3	3–3	4–2	11–8	8–12	2–4	7–11
Florida	1–5	8–11	2–4	1–5	2–5	—	3–3	3–3	4–2	10–9	8–11	10–9	4–2	5–1	4–3	4–2	10–8
Houston	3–3	3–3	11–8	11–6	3–3	3–3	—	3–3	10–8	3–3	4–2	3–3	11–6	4–2	1–5	6–13	5–7
Los Angeles	10–9	4–2	4–2	2–4	12–7	3–3	3–3	—	5–1	5–2	4–2	4–3	4–2	10–9	8–11	2–4	12–6
Milwaukee	2–4	1–5	10–7	6–13	3–3	2–4	8–10	1–5	—	2–4	1–5	1–5	4–15	5–1	1–5	7–10	2–10
Montreal	2–4	6–13	3–3	5–1	2–4	9–10	3–3	2–5	4–2	—	11–8	11–8	3–3	3–4	4–2	3–3	12–6
New York	2–5	7–12	5–1	4–2	3–3	11–8	2–4	2–4	5–1	8–11	—	9–10	1–4	3–4	0–6	3–3	10–8
Philadelphia	3–4	7–11	4–2	4–2	3–3	9–10	3–3	3–4	5–1	8–11	10–9	—	2–4	2–4	3–3	4–2	10–8
Pittsburgh	2–4	3–3	9–10	7–11	2–4	2–4	6–11	2–4	15–4	3–3	4–1	4–2	—	2–4	2–4	6–11	3–9
San Diego	7–12	3–3	4–2	1–5	8–11	1–5	2–4	9–10	1–5	4–3	4–3	4–2	4–2	—	5–14	1–5	8–10
San Francisco	11–8	3–3–1	3–3	4–2	11–8	3–4	5–1	11–8	5–1	2–4	6–0	3–3	4–2	14–5	—	2–4	8–10
St. Louis	4–2	1–5	12–6	11–8	4–2	2–4	13–6	4–2	10–7	3–3	3–3	2–4	11–6	5–1	4–2	—	8–4

=== Roster ===
2002 Houston Astros
Roster
Pitchers: 35 Pedro Borbón, Jr.; 41 Nelson Cruz; 29 Octavio Dotel; 45 Tom Gordon; 55 Carlos Hernández; 54 Brad Lidge; 36 Scott Linebrink; 58 Jim Mann; 39 T. J. Mathews; 52 Wade Miller; 23 Dave Mlicki; 53 Peter Munro; 44 Roy Oswalt; 35 Hipólito Pichardo; 59 Brandon Puffer; 51 Tim Redding; 37 Shane Reynolds; 60 Jeriome Robertson; 50 Kirk Saarloos; 20 Ricky Stone; 13 Billy Wagner	Catchers: 11 Brad Ausmus; 46 Raúl Chávez; 2 Gregg Zaun; 43 Alan Zinter; Infielders: 5 Jeff Bagwell; 7 Craig Biggio; 27 Geoff Blum; 14 Morgan Ensberg; 28 Adam Everett; 1 Keith Ginter; 8 Mark Loretta; 4 Julio Lugo; 10 José Vizcaíno	Outfielders: 17 Lance Berkman; 15 Richard Hidalgo; 21 Brian Hunter; 24 Jason Lane; 16 Orlando Merced; 31 Daryle Ward; 45 Barry Wesson	Manager: 22 Jimy Williams; Coaches: 25 José Cruz (first base); 48 Burt Hooton (pitching); 38 Gene Lamont (third base); 6 Mark Bailey (bullpen); 12 Harry Spilman (hitting); 30 John Tamargo (bench)

== Players stats ==
=== Batting ===
==== Starters by position ====
Note: Pos = Position; G = Games played; AB = At bats; H = Hits; Avg. = Batting average; HR = Home runs; RBI = Runs batted in

Pos	Player	G	AB	H	Avg.	HR	RBI
C	Brad Ausmus	130	447	115	.257	6	50
1B	Jeff Bagwell	158	571	166	.291	31	98
2B	Craig Biggio	145	577	146	.253	15	58
SS	Julio Lugo	88	322	84	.261	8	35
3B	Geoff Blum	130	368	104	.283	10	52
LF	Daryle Ward	136	453	125	.276	12	72
CF	Lance Berkman	158	578	169	.292	42	128
RF	Richard Hidalgo	114	388	91	.235	15	48

==== Other batters ====
Note: G = Games played; AB = At bats; H = Hits; Avg. = Batting average; HR = Home runs; RBI = Runs batted in

Player	G	AB	H	Avg.	HR	RBI
José Vizcaíno	125	406	123	.303	5	37
Orlando Merced	123	251	72	.287	6	30
Brian Hunter	98	201	54	.269	3	20
Gregg Zaun	76	185	41	.222	3	24
Morgan Ensberg	49	132	32	.242	3	19
Adam Everett	40	88	17	.193	0	4
Jason Lane	44	69	20	.290	4	10
Mark Loretta	21	66	28	.424	2	8
Alan Zinter	39	44	6	.136	2	3
Barry Wesson	15	20	4	.200	0	1
Keith Ginter	7	5	1	.200	0	0
Raúl Chávez	2	4	1	.250	0	0

== Pitching ==
=== Starting pitchers ===
Note: G = Games pitched; IP = Innings pitched; W = Wins; L = Losses; ERA = Earned run average; SO = Strikeouts

Player	G	IP	W	L	ERA	SO
Roy Oswalt	35	233.0	19	9	3.01	208
Wade Miller	26	164.2	15	4	3.28	144
Carlos Hernández	23	111.0	7	5	4.38	93
Kirk Saarloos	17	85.1	6	7	6.01	54
Shane Reynolds	13	74.0	3	6	4.86	47

=== Other pitchers ===
Note: G = Games pitched; IP = Innings pitching; W = Wins; L = Losses; ERA = Earned run average; SO = Strikeouts

Player	G	IP	W	L	ERA	SO
Dave Mlicki	22	86.0	4	10	5.34	57
Peter Munro	19	80.2	5	5	3.57	45
Tim Redding	18	73.1	3	6	5.40	63

=== Relief pitchers ===
Note: G = Games pitched; W = Wins; L = Losses; SV = Saves; ERA = Earned run average; SO = Strikeouts

Player	G	W	L	SV	ERA	SO
Billy Wagner	70	4	2	35	2.52	38
Octavio Dotel	83	6	4	6	1.85	118
Ricky Stone	78	3	3	1	3.61	63
Pedro Borbón Jr.	56	3	2	1	5.50	39
Brandon Puffer	55	3	3	0	4.43	48
Nelson Cruz	43	2	6	0	4.48	61
Scott Linebrink	22	0	0	0	7.03	24
Jim Mann	17	0	1	0	4.09	19
Tom Gordon	15	0	2	0	3.32	17
T.J. Mathews	12	0	0	0	3.44	13
Jeriome Robertson	11	0	2	0	6.52	6
Brad Lidge	6	1	0	0	6.23	12
Hipólito Pichardo	1	0	1	0	81.00	0

== Awards and achievements ==
=== Grand slams ===
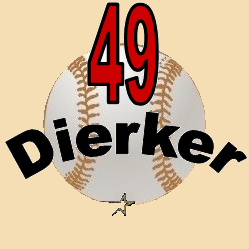
Larry Dierker's number 24 was retired by the Houston Astros in May 19, 2002.

No.	Date	Astros batter	Venue	Inning	Pitcher	Opposing team	Box
1	June 20	Lance Berkman	Miller Park	4	Jamey Wright	Milwaukee Brewers	
2	June 27	Gregg Zaun (Note: 1st MLB grand slam) (Note: Pinch hitter)	Minute Maid Park	9 (Note: Walk-off)	Byung-hyun Kim	Arizona Diamondbacks	
3	July 6	Daryle Ward	PNC Park	5	Kip Wells	Pittsburgh Pirates	

=== Career honors ===
Ford Frick Award winner
Broadcaster		Start	Finish	HOF
Harry Kalas	Biography	1965	1970	2002
See also: Ford C. Frick Award • Ref:

- Hispanic Heritage Baseball Museum Hall of Fame inductee: René Cárdenas • Houston Colt .45s/Astros Spanish broadcast: 1962–1977
- Houston Colt .45s/Astros uniform no. 49 retired • Larry Dierker:
  - Pitcher: 1964–1977 • 345 games • 2× MLB All-Star
  - Broadcaster: 1979–1996 (Note: Subsequently broadcast for Houston in 2004 and 2005.)
  - Manager: 1997–2001

=== Annual awards ===
2002 Houston Astros award winners
Name of award		Recipient	Ref.
Darryl Kile Good Guy Award		Jeff Bagwell	
Fred Hartman Award for Long and Meritorious Service to Baseball		Harry Shattuck	
Gold Glove Award	Catcher	Brad Ausmus	
Houston-Area Major League Player of the Year	PIT	Kip Wells	
Houston Astros	Most Valuable Player (MVP)	Lance Berkman	
Houston Astros	Pitcher of the Year	Chuck McElroy	
Houston Astros	Rookie of the Year	Ricky Stone	
MLB All-Star Game	Home Run Derby contestant	Lance Berkman	
MLB All-Star Game	Reserve outfielder	Lance Berkman	
National League (NL) Pitcher of the Month	August	Roy Oswalt	
National League (NL) Player of the Week	May 5	Lance Berkman	
National League (NL) Rookie of the Month	July	Kirk Saarloos	

Other awards results

Name of award	Voting recipient(s) (Team)	Ref.
NL Cy Young	1st—R. Johnson (ARI) • 4th—Oswalt (HOU)	
NL Most Valuable Player	1st—Bonds (SFG) • 3rd—Berkman (HOU); Other Astros: 23rd—Oswalt	

=== NL batting leaders ===
- Double plays grounded into: Brad Ausmus (30—led MLB)
- Runs batted in (RBI): Lance Berkman (128)

=== Milestones ===
==== Major League debuts ====
Player—Appeared at position

- Brad Lidge, relief pitcher
- Jason Lane, pinch hitter
- Kirk Saarloos, starting pitcher
- Alan Zinter, pinch hitter
Date and opponent

- April 26 at Atlanta
- May 10 at Pittsburgh
- June 18 at Milwaukee
- June 18 at Milwaukee
Box

Also:

== Minor league system ==
Level	Team	League	Manager
AAA	New Orleans Zephyrs	Pacific Coast League	Chris Maloney
AA	Round Rock Express	Texas League	Jackie Moore
A	Michigan Battle Cats	Midwest League	John Massarelli
A	Lexington Legends	South Atlantic League	Joe Cannon
A-Short Season	Tri-City ValleyCats	New York–Penn League	Iván DeJesús
Rookie	Martinsville Astros	Appalachian League	Jorge Orta

Awards

- Houston Astros Minor League Player of the Year: Kirk Saarloos
- Pacific Coast League Pitcher of the Year: Jeriome Robertson, LHP
- Triple-A All-Star Team—Pitcher: Jeriome Robertson

== See also ==
- List of Major League Baseball annual runs batted in leaders
- List of Major League Baseball players to hit for the cycle
- List of Major League Baseball retired numbers
