= Major League Baseball tie-breaking procedures (1995–2011) =

Baseball tiebreaker procedure

Because inclusion in the Major League Baseball postseason is based upon the teams' regular-season records, procedures exist to break ties between teams.

This page described tie-breaking procedures in effect from 1995 through 2011. For current procedures, see Major League Baseball tie-breaking procedures.

== Ties between two teams ==
=== Two-way tie for the division or wildcard ===
One game tie-breakers are played between teams tied for a division championship or wild-card berth on the day after the season was scheduled to end.

Two teams that are tied for a division championship play a tie-breaker if said game would eliminate the loser from the playoffs entirely. This was the case in 2009 when the Minnesota Twins and the Detroit Tigers were tied at the end of the regular season for the American League Central division title. Since the 2009 season, home advantage has been determined by comparing the teams involved in the tie by a set of performance criteria, with the first tiebreaker being head-to-head record. Accordingly, the first one-game playoff under the new rules, the AL Central playoff between the Minnesota Twins and Detroit Tigers, was hosted by the Twins, who won the scheduled season series 11–7. The Twins won that game and advanced to the Division Series, where they were swept by the eventual World Series winners, the New York Yankees.

Two teams that are tied for the wild-card berth (such that both teams have a worse record than their division champion, whether in the same division or not), always play a tiebreaker game. Home-field advantage in this scenario is given according to tie-breakers outlined in the next section.

Prior to 2009, home-field advantage in the game was determined by a series of coin tosses that occurred a few weeks before the end of the season between teams that were close enough to each other in the standings where a tie becomes a significant possibility. If new situations occurred (i.e. a team quickly rises in the standings making another tie possible) more coin tosses occurred. Contrary to what some believe, home-field advantage was not determined by head-to-head record in the regular season until 2009. For example, in 1995, the Seattle Mariners and California Angels played a one-game playoff to determine the AL West championship. The Mariners hosted (and won) the one game playoff but lost the season series 5–7 in games (excluding the one game playoff).

=== If postseason berths are not in dispute ===
No game is played if both teams are guaranteed to go to the playoffs. This happened in 2001 Major League Baseball season when the Houston Astros (9–7 against STL) and St. Louis Cardinals (7–9 against HOU) tied for first in the National League Central with records of 93–69. In 2005, the New York Yankees (10–9 against BOS) and Boston Red Sox (9–10 against NYY) each finished 95–67 in the American League East. In 2006, the Los Angeles Dodgers (5–13 against SD) and the San Diego Padres (13–5 against LAD) were tied for the National League West division title and the Wild Card at 88–74. In this case, the rules below are used to determine the division winner.

Two-way intradivision tie-breaker, with both teams already guaranteed a playoff spot with one as the division champion and the other as a wildcard. The division title is awarded in the following priority:

1. The team with the best record in head-to-head play.
2. The team with the best overall record ignoring interleague play.
3. The team with the best record in the final 81 games of the season, ignoring interleague play.
4. The team with the best record in the final 82 games of the season, continue one game back until the tie is broken (since teams in the same division play each other as many as 19 times, this step is guaranteed to break the tie. Interleague games are skipped and ignored in this process.)

The loser of this tie-breaker goes to the playoffs as the wild card team.

=== Ties between two division winners ===
If two champions from separate divisions have the same record, a tiebreaker is needed to determine seeding. With the current set-up of Major League Baseball divisions, there are three possible scenarios.

1. The top two teams have the same record, and one of the teams is in the division with the wild-card. In this case, the team from the division that also contains the wild card berth winner becomes the second seed and the other team becomes the first seed. This is a convenience based on the rule that two teams from the same division cannot play each other in the first round of the playoffs, the Division Series round.
  1. if these teams meet again in the League Championship Series, they would be re-seeded based upon the two way intra-division tie-breaker.
2. The top two teams have the same record, but neither team is in the division with the wild-card. Here, the intra-division tiebreaker at the bottom of the previous section is used. This determines the first and second seed.
3. There is a clear winner of the first seed, but the remaining two division winners have the same record. Again, the intra-division tiebreaker at the bottom of the previous section is used. This determines the second and third seed.

== Ties between three teams ==
=== Three-way tie for the division or wildcard ===
If the three teams have identical records against each other in the regular season, the office of the commissioner conducts a draw with the teams designated as teams A, B, and C. First, Team A hosts Team B. The following day, the winner of that game plays and hosts Team C. The winner of the game on the second day advances to the playoffs. The team designations are determined as follows:

- If the teams do not have identical records against one another, and one team has a best record against both other teams, and another team has a winning record against the final team, the first team shall get the first pick of their team designation, the second team gets the second pick, and the last team is assigned the remaining designation.
- If one team has a better record against both of the other teams, and the two other teams have the same record against each other, then the first team would get the first pick for team designation, and the other teams would draw lots. The winner of the draw would get the second pick, and the loser of the draw would be assigned the remaining designation.
- If two teams have the same record against each other, and both have a better record than the last team, then the first two teams draw lots, with the winner choosing their designation first, the loser of the draw picking their designation second and the final team being assigned the remaining designation.
- If each team has a winning record against one other team in the three team group, and a losing record against the other team in the three team group, the priority for choosing designations shall be chosen based on overall winning percentage within the three team group, any ties in winning percentage within the three team group will be broken by drawing lots.

=== "Mixed" three-way tie ===
The situation may arise that two teams from the same division are tied for the division championship, but they are also tied with another team from a different division, with that team not having the best record in their division, but having a better record than all of the other non-division winners.

In this case the two teams in the same division play a one-game playoff, with the winner declared the division champion. The next day, the loser of the first game, and the other team from the other division play each other, with the winner declared the wild card.

=== Three-way ties between division winners ===
If there is a three-way tie among all division champions, the team with the best record against both of the other division champion is given the top seed with the remaining teams seeded as follows:

1. Best record in games against own division.
2. Best overall record in the regular season ignoring interleague play.
3. The team with the best record in the final 81 games of the season, ignoring interleague play.
4. The team with the best record in the final 82 games of the season, extending backward until the tie is broken (since teams in the same division play each other as much as 19 times, this step is guaranteed to break the tie, with interleague games skipped and ignored in this process.)

If neither team has a better record against the other teams, immediately go to above tiebreaker.

== Ties between four teams ==
The four teams draw lots, as teams A, B, C, and D. On the first day, Team B plays at Team A, and Team D plays at Team C. The next day, the winners of these games play each other at the ballpark of the winner between Team A and B.
