= Wilfredo Rodríguez =

Venezuelan baseball player

- Pitcher
- Born: March 20, 1979 (age 47); Bolívar State, Venezuela
- Batted: Left Threw: Left

MLB debut
- September 21, 2001, for the Houston Astros

Last MLB appearance
- October 4, 2001, for the Houston Astros

MLB statistics
- Win–loss record: 0–0
- Earned run average: 15.00
- Strikeouts: 3
- Stats at Baseball Reference

Teams
- Houston Astros (2001)

Wilfredo José Rodríguez (born March 20, 1979) is a Venezuelan former Major League Baseball (MLB) relief pitcher. He appeared in two games for the Houston Astros in the 2001 season. He bats and throws left-handed.

== Career ==
With Houston, Rodríguez posted a 0–0 record with three strikeouts and a 15.00 ERA in three innings. He is most widely known for yielding Barry Bonds' record-tying 70th home run on October 4, 2001. That game was his last appearance in the majors.

After his release by the Astros in 2002, Rodríguez pitched for several more years in the minor leagues. His last year was 2006, when he played for the San Angelo Colts in the independent United League Baseball. He posted a 12.79 ERA in three games.

== See also ==
- List of Major League Baseball players from Venezuela
