= Barry Wesson =

American baseball player (born 1977)

- Outfielder
- Born: April 6, 1977 (age 49); Tupelo, Mississippi, U.S.
- Batted: Right Threw: Right

MLB debut
- July 15, 2002, for the Houston Astros

Last MLB appearance
- September 28, 2003, for the Anaheim Angels

MLB statistics
- Batting average: .194
- Home runs: 1
- Runs batted in: 4
- Stats at Baseball Reference

Teams
- Houston Astros (2002); Anaheim Angels (2003)

Barry Jarvis Wesson (born April 6, 1977) is an American former right-handed outfielder in Major League Baseball who played for the Houston Astros and Anaheim Angels.

== Career ==
Barry Wesson was drafted by the Houston Astros in the 14th round of the amateur draft. Wesson signed on to play in the Astros organization. He spent 1995 mostly at the Rookie level, the lowest level in the minors. He then spent the following five years playing at the A level. It was not until 2001 that Wesson played most of the season in AA. On October 15, 2001, Wesson was granted free agency, only to be re-signed by the Astros less than a month later. In 2002, Wesson hit .293 in AAA, and it was decided he would be called up. In 20 at bats for the Astros, Wesson hit .200. That year Wesson was selected off waivers by the Anaheim Angels. In 2003, Wesson was again a call up, hitting .182 in 11 at-bats. After the 2004 season, he was granted free agency, and once again signed with the Astros. He spent the 2005 season in the minors. After the season, Wesson was granted free agency and retired.

At the time of his retirement, Wesson had a career batting average of .194 with one home runs in 31 at-bats. He had four runs batted in during this time. His lifetime fielding percentage was 1.000

In 2011 Barry played 33 games for the Rockland Boulders of the independent Can-Am League.
