= Carlos Hernández (pitcher, born 1980) =

Venezuelan baseball player (born 1980)

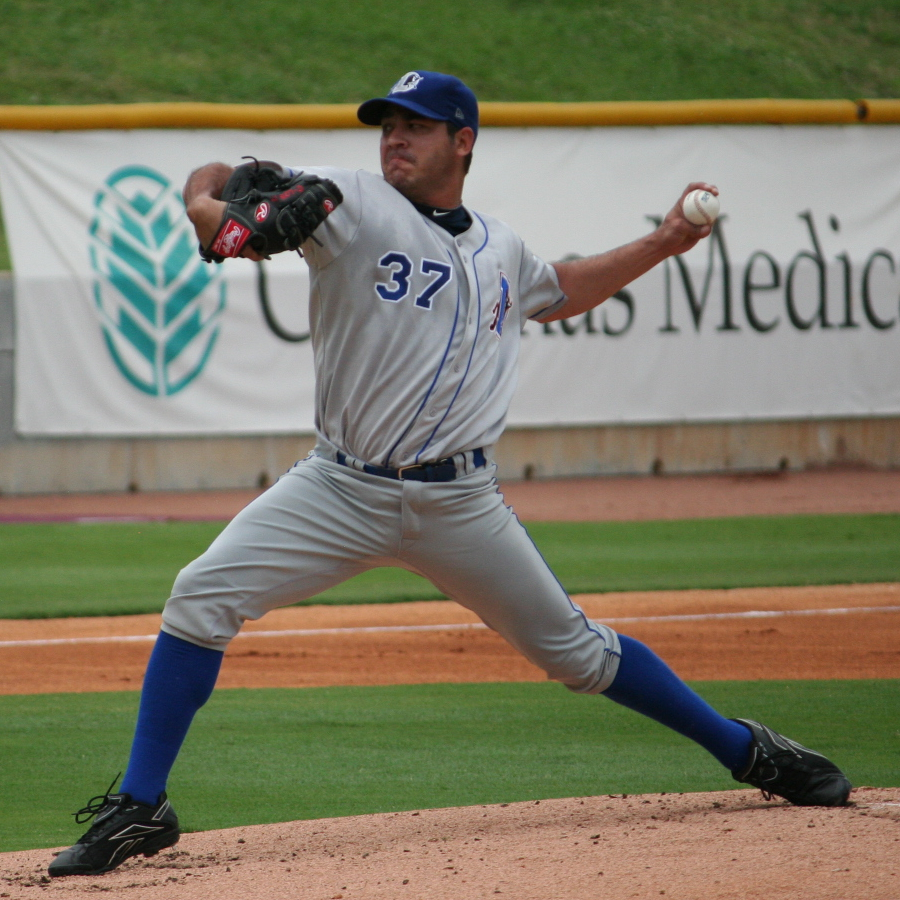
- Hernández with the Durham Bulls in 2010
- Pitcher
- Born: April 22, 1980 (age 46); Guacara, Carabobo, Venezuela
- Batted: Switch Threw: Left

MLB debut
- August 18, 2001, for the Houston Astros

Last MLB appearance
- September 26, 2004, for the Houston Astros

MLB statistics
- Win–loss record: 9–8
- Earned run average: 4.54
- Strikeouts: 136
- Stats at Baseball Reference

Teams
- Houston Astros (2001–2002, 2004)

Carlos Henrique Hernández (Spanish pronunciation: [eɾˈnandeθ]; born April 22, 1980) is a Venezuelan former professional baseball starting pitcher. He played in Major League Baseball (MLB) for the Houston Astros from 2001 to 2002, and 2004.

== Playing career ==
In 2001, Hernández suffered a partial tear of his left rotator cuff diving back to second base. Before the injury, he was 1–0 with a 1.02 ERA, allowing only 11 hits in 17.6 innings. Despite pitching in pain, Hernández again showed promise in 2002, but his season was hampered by an ongoing injury with his left shoulder. He finished 7–5 with a 4.38 ERA in 21 starts, but twice was disabled. He missed the 2003 season following surgery. In 2004, Hernández started his rehabilitation with the New Orleans Zephyrs, the Triple-A affiliate of the Astros, and finished with the big club with a 1–3 mark and a 6.43 ERA in nine starts.

After not playing baseball for anybody in 2007, Hernández signed with the Tampa Bay Rays in 2008 and was assigned to their Single-A affiliate, the Vero Beach Devil Rays, where in six starts, he went 2–1 with a 1.04 ERA.

In a three-year career, Hernández posted a 9–8 record with 136 strikeouts and a 4.54 ERA in 172 2/3 innings.

== Coaching career ==
Prior to the 2025 season, Hernández was named as the pitching coach for the St. Paul Saints, the Triple-A affiliate of the Minnesota Twins.

== Pitching style ==
Hernández throws a low-90s fastball, a good curveball, a changeup, and a decent slider. He is a switch-hitter and throws left-handed.

== See also ==
- List of Major League Baseball players from Venezuela
