= Jim Mann (baseball) =

American baseball player (born 1974)

- Pitcher
- Born: November 17, 1974 (age 50); Brockton, Massachusetts, U.S.
- Batted: Right Threw: Right

MLB debut
- May 29, 2000, for the New York Mets

Last MLB appearance
- August 1, 2003, for the Pittsburgh Pirates

MLB statistics
- Win–loss record: 0–3
- Earned run average: 4.83
- Strikeouts: 25
- Stats at Baseball Reference

Teams
- New York Mets (2000); Houston Astros (2001–2002); Pittsburgh Pirates (2003)

James Joseph Mann (born November 17, 1974) is an American former professional baseball pitcher. He played in Major League Baseball (MLB) between 2000 and 2003 for the New York Mets, Houston Astros, and Pittsburgh Pirates.

A right-hander born in Brockton, Massachusetts, Mann grew up in Holbrook, Massachusetts. During his senior year in 1992, Mann led the town's high school baseball team to an appearance in the Massachusetts Interscholastic Athletic Association (MIAA) tournament. He subsequently attended Massasoit Community College and starred on the school's 1993 NJCAA Division II National Championship baseball team. He was inducted into the school's athletics hall of fame in 2015. In 1993, he played collegiate summer baseball with the Wareham Gatemen of the Cape Cod Baseball League.

Mann was selected in the 54th round (1468th overall) of the June 1993 amateur entry draft by the Toronto Blue Jays. Mann was selected by the New York Mets in the 1999 Rule 5 draft, returned to the Blue Jays and then reacquired via trade in March 2000. He made his major league debut in May of that year against the Los Angeles Dodgers. He later pitched for the Houston Astros during parts of the 2001 and 2002 seasons and for the Pittsburgh Pirates during part of the 2003 season.
