= Richard Hidalgo =

Venezuelan baseball player (born 1975)

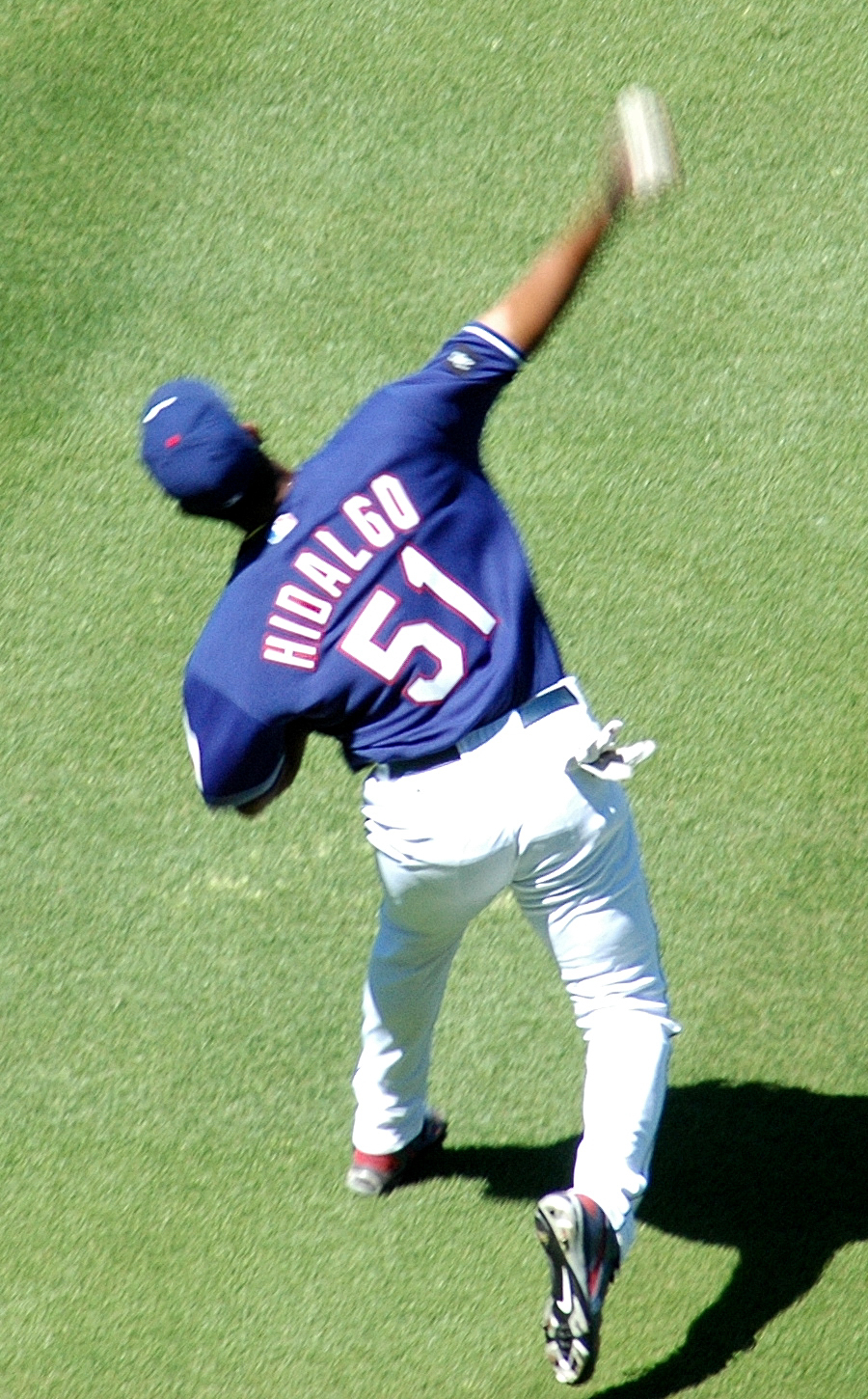
- Hidalgo playing for the Rangers in 2005
- Outfielder
- Born: June 28, 1975 (age 51); Caracas, Venezuela
- Batted: Right Threw: Right

MLB debut
- September 1, 1997, for the Houston Astros

Last MLB appearance
- August 4, 2005, for the Texas Rangers

MLB statistics
- Batting average: .269
- Home runs: 171
- Runs batted in: 560
- Stats at Baseball Reference

Teams
- Houston Astros (1997–2004); New York Mets (2004); Texas Rangers (2005)

Richard José Hidalgo [ee-dahl'-go] (born June 28, 1975) is a Venezuelan former professional outfielder. He played with the Houston Astros (1997–2004), New York Mets (2004), and the Texas Rangers (2005) of Major League Baseball (MLB). He batted and threw right-handed.

== Career ==
Hidalgo was signed as a 16-year-old by the Houston Astros from its Venezuela academy.

After hitting .306 and .303 in his first two seasons, his numbers came down with a .227 average, although he showed some power with 15 home runs in 383 at-bats. He required season-ending surgery to treat a congenital knee condition.

Hidalgo blossomed in 2000, when he hit .314 with 44 home runs and 122 run batted in (RBI). That season, Hidalgo set the Astros' extra-base hit streak record, matched in 2017 by Alex Bregman, at 10 games. In April of 2000 Hidalgo hit the first home run as an Astro in Enron field and later In September 2000 Hidalgo set an Astros record of .476 average that was surpassed by Jose Altuve in 2018. He signed a 4-year $32 million contract after that season.

On November 22, 2002, Hidalgo was shot in the left forearm during a carjacking in Venezuela. In 2003, he returned to good form both at the plate and in the field. He posted numbers of .309, 28, 88, collected three homers in a game, and led the majors outfielders in assists with 22, while committing only four errors.

Despite being named National League player of the month for April 2004, Hidalgo struggled at the plate and was benched by manager, Jimy Williams, by May. The Astros then traded him to the New York Mets for David Weathers and Jeremy Griffiths. He set a Mets record by homering in 5 consecutive games. Hidalgo hit .239 with 25 homers and 82 RBIs for the season.

Hidalgo, a free agent, signed with the Texas Rangers for the 2005 season.

In 2006, he signed a minor league contract with the Baltimore Orioles, but left the team before the season started, when his wife became ill. Hidalgo requested to be released from his contract, allowing to him to go to Japan where he would have a starting role. In the 2006 off-season, the Boston Red Sox and Chicago Cubs reportedly showed interest in signing Hidalgo.

In January 2007, the Astros signed him again, this time to a minor league contract. This second tenure was short-lived, as Hidalgo was released by the Astros on March 25, 2007, after refusing a minor league assignment.

Hidalgo was a Major League .269 lifetime hitter with 171 home runs and 560 RBIs in 987 games. Defensively, he recorded a .987 fielding percentage playing at all three outfield positions.

On April 10, 2007, Hidalgo joined the Long Island Ducks. Before spring training, however, he announced his retirement from professional baseball. On July 8, 2008, Hidalgo signed with the Ducks again but left the team during the last week of August.

In early 2008, Hidalgo's attempt to create a so-called "field of dreams" on his Florida property was voted down by residents of his neighborhood. Hidalgo has three sons who live with his wife in Florida.

== See also ==
- Houston Astros award winners and league leaders
- List of Major League Baseball players from Venezuela

Awards and achievements
Preceded by Todd Helton	National League Player of the Month; September, 2000	Succeeded by Luis Gonzalez
