= Keith Ginter =

American baseball player (born 1976)

- Second baseman / Third baseman
- Born: May 5, 1976 (age 50); Norwalk, California, U.S.
- Batted: Right Threw: Right

MLB debut
- September 20, 2000, for the Houston Astros

Last MLB appearance
- September 18, 2005, for the Oakland Athletics

MLB statistics
- Batting average: .243
- Home runs: 38
- Runs batted in: 140
- Stats at Baseball Reference

Teams
- Houston Astros (2000–2002); Milwaukee Brewers (2002–2004); Oakland Athletics (2005)

Keith Michael Ginter (born May 5, 1976) is an American former Major League Baseball infielder. Ginter is a graduate of Fullerton Union High School in Fullerton, California.

== College ==
Ginter attended and played baseball at Cypress College before transferring to Texas Tech University. During his two years at Texas Tech University, Ginter was a two-time All-American and helped the Red Raiders in NCAA Regional action.

== Professional career ==
Ginter was drafted by the Houston Astros in the 10th Round of the 1998 amateur entry draft and began his professional career playing for the Auburn Doubledays of the New York–Penn League and made his first major league appearance playing for the Astros on September 20, 2000.

In September 2002, Ginter was traded along with Wayne Franklin to Milwaukee Brewers for Mark Loretta and cash. Ginter played for the Brewers until December 2004 when he was traded to the Oakland Athletics for Nelson Cruz and Justin Lehr. During the 2004 season, Ginter had been named National League Player of the Week.

Ginter split the 2005 seasons between Oakland and the team's triple-A affiliate Sacramento River Cats, and spent the entire 2006 season at triple-A.

On January 2, 2007, he was signed by Cleveland Indians to a minor league contract and invited to spring training, but spent the entire 2007 season playing for the Buffalo Bisons.

On December 13, 2007, he was signed by Boston Red Sox to a minor league contract, and attended the team's spring training session but was assigned to the team's minor league camp on March 19, 2008. He became a free agent at the end of the 2008 season and signed a minor league contract with the Chicago White Sox on January 6, 2009. He was released by the White Sox on March 15, 2010.

On April 26, 2010, he was signed by the Orange County Flyers of the independent Golden Baseball League and was their starting third baseman for the 2010 season.

He is not related to Matt Ginter, a pitcher who pitched in the majors from 2000 to 2008.

== Spring training incident ==
In spring training of 2000, Ginter and five teammates from the Houston Astros organization were in a player's hotel room with a female guest when two gunmen burst in, tied them up and robbed them. The gunmen then went to the next room where Aaron Miles wrestled one of them to the ground while the other one fled. The other players involved were Morgan Ensberg, Derrek Nicholson, Mike Rose, and Eric Cole.
