= Wayne Franklin =

American baseball player

- Pitcher
- Born: March 9, 1974 (age 52); Wilmington, Delaware, U.S.
- Batted: Left Threw: Left

MLB debut
- July 24, 2000, for the Houston Astros

Last MLB appearance
- September 30, 2006, for the Atlanta Braves

MLB statistics
- Win–loss record: 14–16
- Earned run average: 5.54
- Strikeouts: 216
- Stats at Baseball Reference

Former teams
- Houston Astros (2000–2001); Milwaukee Brewers (2002–2003); San Francisco Giants (2004); New York Yankees (2005); Atlanta Braves (2006); Uni-President Lions (2007)

Gary Wayne Franklin (born March 9, 1974) is an American former professional baseball pitcher. He played seven seasons in Major League Baseball (MLB) for the Houston Astros (2000-2001), Milwaukee Brewers (2002-2003), San Francisco Giants (2004), New York Yankees (2005), and Atlanta Braves (2006). Franklin bats and throws left-handed.

== Baseball career ==
=== Minor League Baseball (1996–2000) ===
Franklin was originally drafted by the Los Angeles Dodgers in the 36th round of the 1996 amateur draft out of the University of Maryland. He signed with the team on June 8, 1996, just four days after being drafted. Wayne began his professional career with the Los Angeles farm team the Yakima Bears in 1996, where he went 1–0 with 1 save and a 2.52 ERA. The following year, he pitched mostly as a reliever for the Single-A Savannah Sand Gnats. He did, however, make 7 starts, and he finished the 1997 season with a 5–3 record, a 3.11 ERA, and 2 saves. In 1998, playing with the Vero Beach Dodgers, Franklin earned a career-high 9 wins and he also notched 10 saves and a 3.53 ERA in 86.2 innings pitched. However, it was his last season in the Dodgers organization. On December 14, Franklin was drafted by the Houston Astros in the Rule 5 Draft. After going 3–0 with a 1.53 ERA in 12 games for Single-A Kissimmee, Franklin was called up to the Jackson Generals in May 1999. After being called up, Franklin posted a 3–1 record with 20 saves and a 1.61 ERA. He was named to the Texas League All-Star team and placed 2nd in relievers with a .178 opponent batting average. Franklin began the 2000 season with the AAA New Orleans Zephyrs, but was called up after 48 games when he put up a 3–3 record with a 3.63 ERA.

=== Major League Baseball (2000–2006) ===
==== Houston Astros (2000–2001) ====
He made his big league debut with the Astros on July 24 against the Cincinnati Reds. The first batter he faced was Ken Griffey Jr., getting him to ground out. He recorded a 2.79 ERA in 16 appearances and only gave up 6 hits to 34 batters faced. In 2001, Wayne was on the Houston Opening Day roster and made 11 relief outings, but was sent down to the Zephyrs on May 5 after putting up a 6.75 earned run average. With New Orleans, he went 2–1 with 51 strikeouts in 41 relief appearances.

==== Milwaukee Brewers (2002–2003) ====
In 2002, Franklin became a starter, going 13–9 with a 3.17 ERA for the Zephyrs and leading the Pacific Coast League with 163 K's. On September 3, he was traded to the Milwaukee Brewers along with Keith Ginter to complete an earlier deal involving Mark Loretta. He debuted for the Brewers on September 19 against the St. Louis Cardinals. Wayne ended the year with a 2–1 record, a 2.62 ERA, and 17 strikeouts in 4 starts for Milwaukee. After going 10–13 with a 5.50 earned run average and a career-high 116 strikeouts for the Brewers in 2003, Franklin was traded to the San Francisco Giants along with Leo Estrella, for Carlos Villanueva and Glenn Woolard on March 30, 2004.

==== San Francisco Giants (2004) ====
Franklin was converted back to a reliever in 2004 for San Francisco after having led the league in home runs allowed the year before, going 2–1 with a 6.39 ERA and 40 strikeouts. He notched his first victory with the Giants on May 21 vs. the Montreal Expos. On July 28 against the San Diego Padres, Wayne was removed from the game with a lower back strain. Franklin was activated from the disabled list on August 18, in between games of a double header against the Expos. He made a spot start for San Francisco in the nightcap, only giving up one run in six innings to earn the victory. Franklin returned to the bullpen for his final 6 appearances, recording a 4.26 ERA. He played in the Venezuelan Winter League in the offseason.

==== New York Yankees (2005) ====
On March 30, 2005, Franklin was released by the Giants after appearing in 8 spring training games for the team. He was picked up by the New York Yankees as a free agent on April 4. He had posted a 2–3 record and a save in 46 games with the AAA Columbus Clippers before his contract was purchased by the Yankees on July 1. He made five appearances out of the bullpen before being demoted to Columbus on July 20. Wayne was granted free agency at the season's end.

==== Atlanta Braves (2006) ====
Franklin signed a minor league contract with the Tampa Bay Devil Rays on January 11, 2006, and was invited to spring training. He was assigned to minor league camp on March 28. On August 6, Franklin's contract was purchased by the Atlanta Braves from AAA Richmond. He made his first appearance for the Braves on August 7 against the Philadelphia Phillies. On December 5, 2006, Franklin signed a minor league contract with the Kansas City Royals and was invited to spring training.

=== International & Independent League career (2007–2014) ===
In 2007, Franklin signed with the York Revolution of the independent Atlantic League of Professional Baseball and later signed with Uni-President Lions of Chinese Professional Baseball League in Taiwan. On January 24, 2008, Franklin re-signed with the Revolution. He also played for the Potros de Tijuana of the Mexican League. In 2009, he re-signed with the Revolution and also saw time with the Southern Maryland Blue Crabs and Camden Riversharks of the Atlantic League. He then signed with the Chico Outlaws of the Golden Baseball League. In 2010, he split the season between Chico and the Lancaster Barnstormers of the Atlantic League. In 2013, he played for the East Bay Lumberjacks of the Pacific Association. In 2014, he was hired to be the first manager of the new Pittsburg Mettle ballclub in the Pacific Association. Franklin led the league in complete games (5) and innings pitched (116) while managing the team to a 22–56 record.

== Coaching ==
From (2019-2020), Franklin managed the San Diego Jets, a Collegiate summer baseball team in the San Diego League. In his first season, Franklin led the Jets to a League Championship. In 2021, he became manager of the Lake Mills 94's of the Dairyland Collegiate League where they held a 12–14 record. Franklin has also spent time in recent years as a pitching coach for San Francisco State, Menlo and Holy Names.
