= Wade Miller =

American baseball player (born 1976)

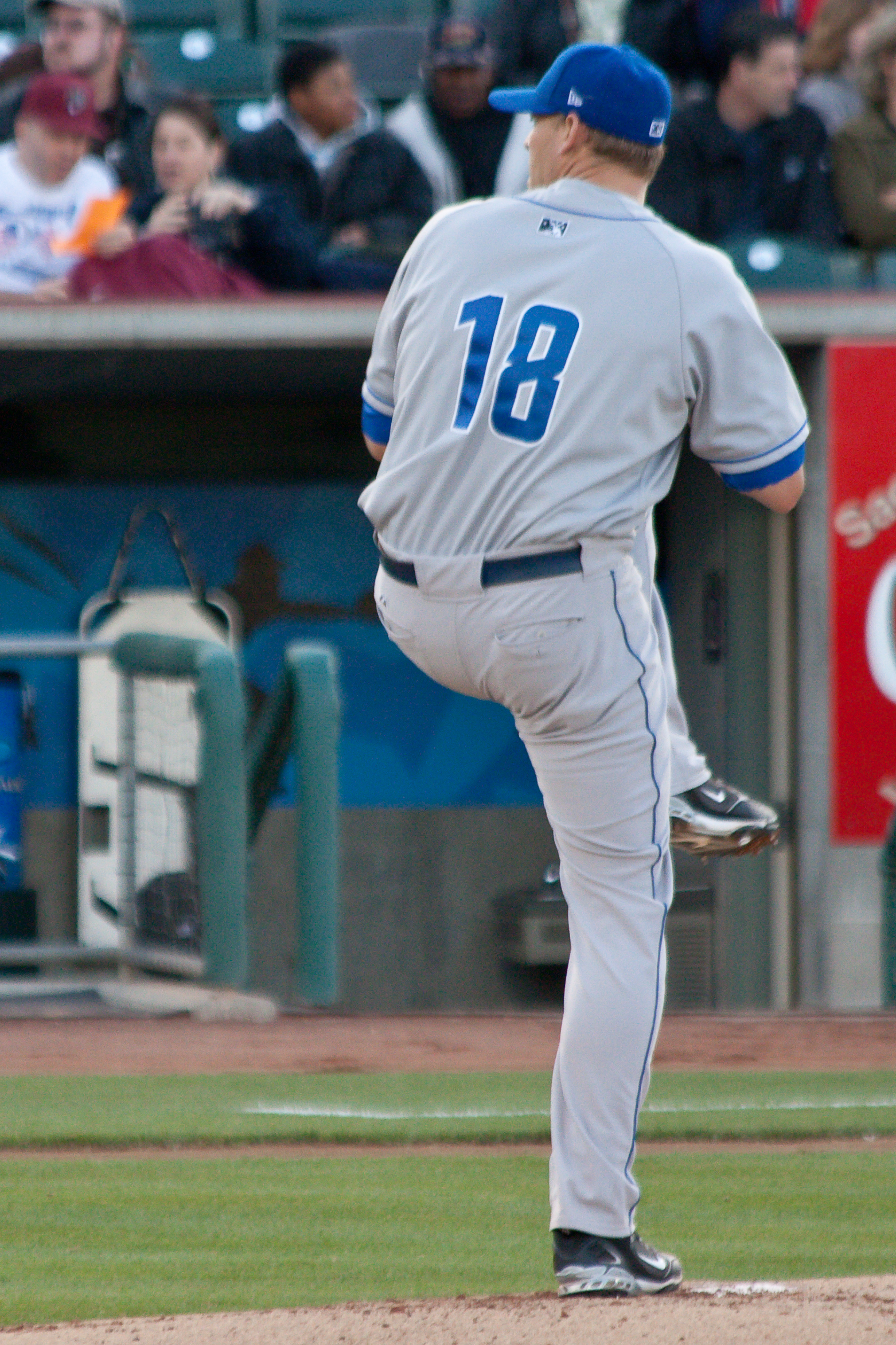
- Pitcher
- Born: September 13, 1976 (age 50); Reading, Pennsylvania, U.S.
- Batted: Right Threw: Right

MLB debut
- July 7, 1999, for the Houston Astros

Last MLB appearance
- April 22, 2007, for the Chicago Cubs

MLB statistics
- Win–loss record: 62–46
- Earned run average: 4.10
- Strikeouts: 749
- Stats at Baseball Reference

Teams
- Houston Astros (1999–2004); Boston Red Sox (2005); Chicago Cubs (2006–2007)

Wade Thomas Miller (born September 13, 1976) is an American former professional baseball starting pitcher, who played in Major League Baseball (MLB) for the Houston Astros (1999–2004), Boston Red Sox (2005), and Chicago Cubs (2006–2007). He batted and threw right-handed. Miller attended Brandywine Heights High School in Topton, Pennsylvania. He is currently Alvernia University's pitching coach, a position he assumed in 2012.

== Career ==
Miller was drafted out of Alvernia University (Reading, PA) by the Houston Astros, in 1996. He won 45 games in a three-year period for the Astros. Miller was one of the best young pitchers in the National League (NL) before injuring the rotator cuff in his pitching shoulder in 2004.

Miller went 16–8 with 183 strikeouts and a 3.40 earned run average (ERA) in 2001. A year later, he was close behind at 15–4, 144, 3.35, and tied the club record with a 12-game winning streak over the summer. Miller then pitched through right forearm pain in 2003, but still was 14–13, 161, 4.13, and led his team in starts (33) and innings (187.1).

In 2004, Miller was 7–7 with 74 strikeouts and a 3.35 ERA in 15 starts before going on the disabled list in June with a season-ending rotator cuff injury. The Astros believed he was playing hurt with shoulder and elbow injuries much of the year before, but Miller never complained about them.

A free agent before the 2005 season, Miller was signed by the Boston Red Sox. He started the year on the disabled list. The acquisition paid off well when Miller was activated on May 8, while starters Curt Schilling and David Wells spent time on the DL. Miller finished the 2005 campaign with a record of 4–4 and a 4.95 ERA.

On January 23, 2006, the Chicago Cubs signed Miller to a one-year, $1 million contract, with $1 million more in incentives. He made his first start of the 2006 season on September 9. Overall, Miller made five starts in 2006, finishing with a record of 0–2 with a 4.57 ERA. He filed for free agency after the season.

On November 9, 2006, Miller signed an incentive-laden, $1.5 million one-year extension to stay with the Cubs under new manager Lou Piniella. However, after three unsuccessful starts where he compiled a 10-plus ERA, Miller was once again placed on the DL in July 2007. He was placed on waivers granting his unconditional release from the Cubs in August 2007.

On March 7, 2009, Miller agreed to a minor league contract with the Toronto Blue Jays. He retired from baseball, following that season.

In a nine-year MLB career, Miller compiled a 62–46 record with 749 strikeouts and a 4.10 ERA in 894 1/3 innings pitched.

== After baseball ==
Miller was inducted into the Reading Baseball Hall of Fame on July 21, 2011.

== See also ==
- Houston Astros award winners and league leaders
