= Chris Truby =

American baseball player and coach (born 1973)

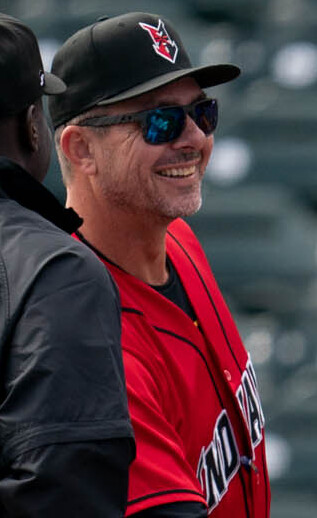
- Truby with the Indianapolis Indians in 2024

Pittsburgh Pirates – No. 44
- Coach
- Born: December 9, 1973 (age 52); Palm Springs, California, U.S.
- Batted: Right Threw: Right

MLB debut
- June 16, 2000, for the Houston Astros

Last MLB appearance
- May 7, 2003, for the Tampa Bay Devil Rays

MLB statistics
- Batting average: .231
- Home runs: 23
- Runs batted in: 107
- Stats at Baseball Reference

Teams
- As player: Houston Astros (2000–2001); Montreal Expos (2002); Detroit Tigers (2002); Tampa Bay Devil Rays (2003); As coach: Pittsburgh Pirates (2025–present)

Christopher John Truby (born December 9, 1973) is an American former professional third baseman and current major league coach for the Pittsburgh Pirates of Major League Baseball (MLB). Truby played in MLB for the Houston Astros, Montreal Expos, Detroit Tigers, and Tampa Bay Devil Rays, though most of his time was spent in various teams' minor league systems. Truby is a 1992 graduate of Damien Memorial High School in Honolulu, Hawaii.

== Playing career ==
Truby came up in 2000 with the Houston Astros. After hitting .260 with 11 home runs in 258 at bats his rookie season, he never matched his rookie totals. He has since played partial seasons with the Detroit Tigers, Montreal Expos, and Tampa Bay Devil Rays. His most recent MLB appearance came during the 2003 season. The Kansas City Royals signed Truby with the intention of having him play third base until prospect Mark Teahen was ready for full-time duty in the major leagues. However, Truby sustained a wrist injury in spring training and started the 2005 season on the disabled list.

Truby was a replacement player in 1995, before the 1994 Major League Baseball strike was resolved. After replacement players were no longer necessary, Truby spent the next five years playing for various Houston Astro's minor league teams before finally breaking through to the Major Leagues with the 2000 Astros. Truby last played for the Indianapolis Indians, the Triple-A affiliate of the Pittsburgh Pirates. On June 22, 2007, Truby announced his retirement from baseball as a player.

== Coaching career ==
In 2008, he took a coaching job in the Pirates minor league system, then was named as manager of the West Oahu CaneFires of Hawaii Winter Baseball.. From 2009-13, Truby managed in the Philadelphia Phillies system, with the Williamsport Crosscutters from 2009–10, the Lakewood BlueClaws in 2011 and the Clearwater Threshers from 2012-13. In 2014, Truby joined the staff of the Phillies parent club as the infield coordinator.

On January 12, 2022, Truby was named the Minor League Infield Coordinator in the Pittsburgh Pirates organization; in January 2025, he was appointed as manager of the Triple-A Indianapolis Indians, where he played nearly 20 years earlier. On May 16, 2025, Truby was promoted to the role of "major league coach."
