= 2001 Colorado Rockies season =

2001 Colorado Rockies
- League: National League
- Division: West
- Ballpark: Coors Field
- City: Denver, Colorado
- Record: 73–89 (.451)
- Divisional place: 5th
- Owner: Jerry McMorris
- General manager: Dan O'Dowd
- Manager: Buddy Bell
- Television: KWGN-TV; Fox Sports Rocky Mountain (George Frazier, Dave Armstrong)
- Radio: KOA (AM) (Wayne Hagin, Jeff Kingery); KCUV (Antonio Guevara)
- Stats: ESPN.com; Baseball Reference

The Colorado Rockies' 2001 season was the ninth for the Rockies. They tried to win the National League West. Buddy Bell was their manager. They played home games at Coors Field. They finished with a record of 73–89, last in the NL West.

== Offseason ==
- November 7, 2000: Mark Little was signed as a free agent by the Colorado Rockies.
- December 4, 2000: Denny Neagle was signed as a free agent by the Colorado Rockies.
- December 10, 2000: Ron Gant was signed as a free agent by the Colorado Rockies.
- December 12, 2000: Mike Hampton was signed as a free agent by the Colorado Rockies.
- January 5, 2001: Greg Norton was signed as a free agent by the Colorado Rockies.
- March 28, 2001: Masato Yoshii was released by the Colorado Rockies.

== Regular season ==
- Rockies pitcher Jason Jennings became the first pitcher since 1901 to throw a shutout and hit a home run in his first Major League game.

=== Season standings ===
NL West
Team	W	L	Pct.	GB	Home	Road
Arizona Diamondbacks	92	70	.568	—	48‍–‍33	44‍–‍37
San Francisco Giants	90	72	.556	2	49‍–‍32	41‍–‍40
Los Angeles Dodgers	86	76	.531	6	44‍–‍37	42‍–‍39
San Diego Padres	79	83	.488	13	35‍–‍46	44‍–‍37
Colorado Rockies	73	89	.451	19	41‍–‍40	32‍–‍49

==== Record vs. opponents ====
2001 National League record Source: MLB Standings Grid – 2001
Team	AZ	ATL	CHC	CIN	COL	FLA	HOU	LAD	MIL	MON	NYM	PHI	PIT	SD	SF	STL	AL
Arizona	—	5–2	6–3	5–1	13–6	4–2	2–4	10–9	3–3	3–3	3–3	3–4	4–2	12–7	10–9	2–4	7–8
Atlanta	2–5	—	4–2	4–2	4–2	9–10	3–3	2–5	3–3	13–6	10–9	10–9	5–1	3–3	4–2	3–3	9–9
Chicago	3–6	2–4	—	13–4	3–3	3–3	8–9	4–2	8–9	3–3	4–2	4–2	10–6	2–4	3–3	9–8	9–6
Cincinnati	1–5	2–4	4–13	—	3–6	4–2	6–11	4–2	6–10	4–2	4–2	2–4	9–8	2–4	4–2	7–10	4–11
Colorado	6–13	2–4	3–3	6–3	—	4–2	2–4	8–11	5–1	3–4	4–3	2–4	2–4	9–10	9–10	6–3	2–10
Florida	2–4	10–9	3–3	2–4	2–4	—	3–3	2–5	4–2	12–7	7–12	5–14	4–2	3–4	2–4	3–3	12–6
Houston	4–2	3–3	9–8	11–6	4–2	3–3	—	2–4	12–5	6–0	3–3	3–3	9–8	3–6	3–3	9–7	9–6
Los Angeles	9–10	5–2	2–4	2–4	11–8	5–2	4–2	—	5–1	2–4	2–4	3–3	7–2	9–10	11–8	3–3	6–9
Milwaukee	3–3	3–3	9–8	10–6	1–5	2–4	5–12	1–5	—	4–2	3–3	3–3	6–11	1–5	5–4	7–10	5–10
Montreal	3–3	6–13	3–3	2–4	4–3	7–12	0–6	4–2	2–4	—	8–11	9–10	5–1	3–3	2–5	2–4	8–10
New York	3–3	9–10	2–4	2–4	3–4	12–7	3–3	4–2	3–3	11–8	—	11–8	4–2	1–5	3–4	1–5	10–8
Philadelphia	4–3	9–10	2–4	4–2	4–2	14–5	3–3	3–3	3–3	10–9	8–11	—	5–1	5–2	3–3	2–4	7–11
Pittsburgh	2–4	1–5	6–10	8–9	4–2	2–4	8–9	2–7	11–6	1–5	2–4	1–5	—	2–4	1–5	3–14	8–7
San Diego	7–12	3–3	4–2	4–2	10–9	4–3	6–3	10–9	5–1	3–3	5–1	2–5	4–2	—	5–14	1–5	6–9
San Francisco	9–10	2–4	3–3	2–4	10–9	4–2	3–3	8–11	4–5	5–2	4–3	3–3	5–1	14–5	—	4–2	10–5
St. Louis	4–2	3–3	8–9	10–7	3–6	3–3	7–9	3–3	10–7	4–2	5–1	4–2	14–3	5–1	2–4	—	8–7

=== Notable transactions ===
- April 25, 2001: Ubaldo Jiménez was signed as an amateur free agent by the Rockies.
- May 29, 2001: Justin Speier was selected off waivers by the Colorado Rockies from the New York Mets.
- June 24, 2001: Brent Mayne was traded by the Colorado Rockies to the Kansas City Royals for Sal Fasano and Mac Suzuki.
- July 13, 2001: Chone Figgins was traded by the Colorado Rockies to the Anaheim Angels for Kimera Bartee.
- July 19, 2001: Todd Walker was traded by the Colorado Rockies with Robin Jennings to the Cincinnati Reds for Alex Ochoa.
- July 25, 2001: Neifi Pérez was traded by the Colorado Rockies to the Kansas City Royals for Jermaine Dye. Dye was then traded by the Rockies to the Oakland Athletics for José Ortiz, Todd Belitz, and Mario Encarnación.
- July 31, 2001: Pedro Astacio was traded by the Colorado Rockies to the Houston Astros for Scott Elarton.
- August 23, 2001: Gary Bennett was traded by the New York Mets to the Colorado Rockies for a player to be named later. The Colorado Rockies sent Ender Chavez (minors) (December 27, 2001) to the New York Mets to complete the trade.
- September 12, 2001: Ross Gload was selected off waivers by the Colorado Rockies from the Chicago Cubs.

=== Major League debuts ===
- Batters:
  - Juan Uribe (Apr 8)
  - Cliff Brumbaugh (May 30)
  - Brent Butler (Jul 4)
  - Mario Encarnación (Aug 26)
- Pitchers:
  - Tim Christman (Apr 21)
  - Shawn Chacón (Apr 29)
  - Jason Jennings (Aug 23)

=== Roster ===
2001 Colorado Rockies
Roster
Pitchers: 50 Juan Acevedo; 34 Pedro Astacio; 46 Todd Belitz; 41 Brian Bohanon; 56 Shawn Chacón; 43 Bobby Chouinard; 54 Tim Christman; 23 Joe Davenport; 37 Kane Davis; 51 Craig Dingman; 40 Scott Elarton; 47 Horacio Estrada; 10 Mike Hampton; 57 Jason Jennings; 49 José Jiménez; 32 Dan Miceli; 28 Mike Myers; 15 Denny Neagle; 48 Chris Nichting; 39 Jay Powell; 30 Justin Speier; 16 Mac Suzuki; 52 John Thomson; 29 Ron Villone; 46 John Wasdin; 36 Gabe White	Catchers: 29 Gary Bennett; 31 Sal Fasano; 8 Brent Mayne; 21 Adam Melhuse; 6 Ben Petrick; Infielders: 2 Brent Butler; 7 Jeff Cirillo; 17 Todd Helton; 12 José Ortiz; 22 Terry Shumpert; 4 Juan Uribe; 12 Todd Walker	Outfielders: 16 Kimera Bartee; 35 Cliff Brumbaugh; 23 Jacob Cruz; 44 Mario Encarnación; 3 Ron Gant; 27 Todd Hollandsworth; 30 Robin Jennings; 55 Brooks Kieschnick; 19 Mark Little; 14 Greg Norton; 3 Alex Ochoa; 9 Juan Pierre; 33 Larry Walker; Other batters: 16 Kevin Sefcik	Manager: 25 Buddy Bell; Coaches: 26 Rich Donnelly (third base); 1 Dave Garcia (asst. coach); 11 Toby Harrah (bench); 13 Clint Hurdle (hitting); 18 Fred Kendall (bullpen); 53 Marcel Lachemann (pitching); 20 Dallas Williams (first base)

=== Game log ===
2001 Game Log
April

#	Date	Opponent	Score	Win	Loss	Save	Attendance	Record
1	April 2	Cardinals	8–0	Hampton (1–0)	Kile (0–1)		48,113	1–0
2	April 4	Cardinals	13–9	Neagle (1–0)	Benes (0–1)	Jiménez (1)	36,667	2–0
3	April 5	Cardinals	11–2	Astacio (1–0)	Morris (0–1)		35,142	3–0
4	April 6	Padres	10–6	Eaton (1–0)	Bohanon (0–1)		37,431	3–1
5	April 7	Padres	14–10	Williams (1–0)	Myers (0–1)	Hoffman (1)	41,026	3–2
6	April 8	Padres	11–3	Tollberg (1–0)	Estrada (0–1)		40,446	3–3
7	April 9	@ Cardinals	3–2	Timlin (1–0)	White (0–1)		48,702	3–4
8	April 11	@ Cardinals	3–1	Morris (1–1)	Astacio (1–1)	Veres (1)	30,115	3–5
9	April 12	@ Cardinals	6–4	Wasdin (1–0)	Kline (0–1)	Jiménez (2)	35,127	4–5
10	April 13	Diamondbacks	7–3	Johnson (2–1)	Bohanon (0–2)		38,564	4–6
11	April 14	Diamondbacks	9–8	Myers (1–1)	Kim (0–1)	Jiménez (3)	42,319	5–6
12	April 15	Diamondbacks	10–7 (10)	Estrada (1–1)	Brohawn (0–1)		36,841	6–6
13	April 17	@ Padres	9–5	Astacio (2–1)	Jones (0–2)	Jiménez (4)	16,615	7–6
14	April 18	@ Padres	8–0	Hampton (2–0)	Eaton (2–1)		17,040	8–6
15	April 19	@ Padres	4–0	Neagle (2–0)	Williams (1–2)		15,896	9–6
16	April 20	@ Diamondbacks	3–2	Kim (1–1)	White (0–2)		32,011	9–7
17	April 21	@ Diamondbacks	10–5	Ellis (2–0)	Villone (0–1)		31,724	9–8
18	April 22	@ Diamondbacks	2–1	Astacio (3–1)	Reynoso (1–3)	Jiménez (5)	31,076	10–8
19	April 24	Cubs	14–1	Hampton (3–0)	Tapani (3–1)		43,562	11–8
20	April 25	Cubs	6–5	Jiménez (1–0)	Duncan (1–1)		42,514	12–8
21	April 26	Cubs	7–2	Lieber (2–1)	Bohanon (0–3)		47,336	12–9
22	April 27	Reds	12–9	Mercado (1–0)	Myers (1–2)	Graves (8)	44,502	12–10
23	April 28	Reds	9–4	Dessens (2–1)	Davis (0–1)		47,143	12–11
24	April 29	Reds	14–7	Wasdin (2–0)	Mercado (1–1)	Jiménez (6)	47,047	13–11

May

#	Date	Opponent	Score	Win	Loss	Save	Attendance	Record
25	May 1	@ Phillies	7–1	Daal (3–0)	Neagle (2–1)		14,138	13–12
26	May 2	@ Phillies	6–2	Bohanon (1–3)	Person (2–3)	Jiménez (7)	13,243	14–12
27	May 3	@ Phillies	7–5	Telemaco (3–0)	Astacio (3–2)		17,383	14–13
28	May 4	@ Pirates	9–3	Hampton (4–0)	Arroyo (2–3)		32,653	15–13
29	May 5	@ Pirates	11–3	Olivares (2–3)	Chacón (0–1)		37,596	15–14
30	May 6	@ Pirates	4–3 (11)	Beimel (2–0)	White (0–3)		34,915	15–15
31	May 7	Mets	10–9	Gonzalez (1–0)	Bohanon (1–4)		34,644	15–16
32	May 8	Mets	12–4	Astacio (4–2)	Appier (2–3)		36,602	16–16
33	May 9	Mets	6–0	Hampton (5–0)	Reed (4–2)		35,952	17–16
34	May 10	Mets	8–2	Chacón (1–1)	Rusch (2–2)		40,603	18–16
35	May 11	Expos	13–4	Neagle (3–1)	Peters (2–3)		43,680	19–16
36	May 12	Expos	8–4	Armas (2–5)	Thomson (0–1)		43,730	19–17
37	May 13	Expos	14–10	Lloyd (3–1)	Astacio (4–3)		42,235	19–18
38	May 15	@ Braves	5–3	Remlinger (2–1)	Hampton (5–1)	Rocker (10)	28,921	19–19
39	May 16	@ Braves	6–4	Cabrera (2–0)	Wasdin (2–1)	Rocker (11)	32,461	19–20
40	May 17	@ Braves	8–3	Neagle (4–1)	Smoltz (0–1)		31,221	20–20
41	May 18	@ Marlins	2–1	Burnett (2–1)	Astacio (4–4)	Alfonseca (8)	20,336	20–21
42	May 19	@ Marlins	1–0	Penny (4–0)	Thomson (0–2)	Alfonseca (9)	23,122	20–22
43	May 20	@ Marlins	7–2	Hampton (6–1)	Dempster (3–6)		13,367	21–22
44	May 21	Dodgers	6–3	Chacón (2–1)	Dreifort (3–3)	Jiménez (8)	38,196	22–22
45	May 22	Dodgers	11–8	White (1–3)	Herges (1–4)	Jiménez (9)	41,563	23–22
46	May 23	Dodgers	6–4	Brown (6–2)	Astacio (4–5)	Shaw (14)	46,836	23–23
47	May 24	@ Giants	5–1	Estes (4–2)	Thomson (0–3)		40,856	23–24
48	May 25	@ Giants	6–1	Hampton (7–1)	Hernández (3–7)		41,341	24–24
49	May 26	@ Giants	10–4	Chacón (3–1)	Rueter (4–6)		41,341	25–24
50	May 27	@ Giants	5–4	Ortiz (7–3)	Neagle (4–2)	Nen (11)	41,341	25–25
51	May 28	@ Dodgers	11–10 (11)	Herges (2–4)	Villone (0–2)		27,812	25–26
52	May 29	@ Dodgers	7–2	Bohanon (2–4)	Brown (6–3)		22,570	26–26
53	May 30	@ Dodgers	4–1	Park (6–4)	Hampton (7–2)	Shaw (16)	30,411	26–27

June

#	Date	Opponent	Score	Win	Loss	Save	Attendance	Record
54	June 1	Giants	11–7	Rueter (5–6)	Chacón (3–2)		40,630	26–28
55	June 2	Giants	7–5	Jiménez (2–0)	Nen (2–2)		40,657	27–28
56	June 3	Giants	11–2	Astacio (5–5)	Gardner (1–4)		41,684	28–28
57	June 5	Astros	9–4	Hampton (8–2)	Miller (7–3)		37,116	29–28
58	June 6	Astros	9–8	Bohanon (3–4)	Elarton (4–5)	Jiménez (10)	36,138	30–28
59	June 7	Astros	2–1	Reynolds (6–4)	Chacón (3–3)	Jackson (1)	35,359	30–29
60	June 8	Cardinals	9–1	Neagle (5–2)	Matthews (2–2)		46,188	31–29
61	June 9	Cardinals	8–2	Benes (5–4)	Astacio (5–6)		47,043	31–30
62	June 10	Cardinals	12–3	Hampton (9–2)	Hermanson (5–5)		47,139	32–30
63	June 12	Mariners	10–9	Fuentes (1–0)	Acevedo (0–1)	Sasaki (25)	41,263	32–31
64	June 14	Mariners	8–2	Chacón (4–3)	Moyer (8–2)		45,261	33–31
65	June 14	Mariners	5–1	Abbott (6–2)	Astacio (5–7)		37,048	33–32
66	June 15	@ Reds	8–4	Villone (1–2)	Reitsma (3–6)		28,301	34–32
67	June 16	@ Reds	8–7 (12)	Jiménez (3–0)	Brower (3–5)	Dingman (1)	29,937	35–32
68	June 17	@ Reds	4–3	Bohanon (4–4)	Dessens (5–4)	Jiménez (11)	25,947	36–32
69	June 18	@ Astros	13–5	Reynolds (7–5)	Astacio (5–8)		31,529	36–33
70	June 19	@ Astros	6–4	Oswalt (5–1)	Chacón (4–4)	Wagner (14)	30,020	36–34
71	June 20	@ Astros	7–2	Miller (8–3)	Villone (1–3)	Dotel (1)	30,637	36–35
72	June 21	Diamondbacks	14–5	Bierbrodt (2–0)	Hampton (9–3)		40,036	36–36
73	June 22	Diamondbacks	5–4 (10)	Swindell (2–1)	Jiménez (3–1)	Prinz (7)	44,655	36–37
74	June 23	Diamondbacks	9–5	Kim (3–2)	White (1–4)		41,612	36–38
75	June 24	Diamondbacks	7–6	Neagle (6–2)	Johnson (9–5)	Jiménez (12)	41,682	37–38
76	June 25	Padres	6–4	Jarvis (4–7)	White (1–5)	Hoffman (16)	37,141	37–39
77	June 26	Padres	11–3	Jones (4–10)	Hampton (9–4)		37,315	37–40
78	June 27	Padres	10–9	Jiménez (4–1)	Davey (2–3)		38,046	38–40
79	June 29	@ Diamondbacks	5–3	Johnson (10–5)	Astacio (5–9)	Kim (4)	34,291	38–41
80	June 30	@ Diamondbacks	6–5	Brohawn (2–3)	Davis (0–2)	Prinz (8)	36,165	38–42

July

#	Date	Opponent	Score	Win	Loss	Save	Attendance	Record
81	July 1	@ Diamondbacks	5–4 (13)	Prinz (3–0)	White (1–6)		31,999	38–43
82	July 3	@ Padres	6–5	Núñez (1–2)	Davis (0–3)	Hoffman (17)	25,022	38–44
83	July 4	@ Padres	8–3	Hitchcock (1–0)	Suzuki (2–6)		34,188	38–45
84	July 5	@ Padres	4–0	Astacio (6–9)	Eaton (8–5)		20,541	39–45
85	July 6	Angels	6–5	Ortiz (7–6)	Hampton (9–5)	Percival (21)	48,576	39–46
86	July 7	Angels	10–3	Washburn (7–4)	Suzuki (2–7)		47,517	39–47
87	July 8	Angels	11–3	Rapp (3–9)	Chacón (4–5)	Pote (1)	37,577	39–48
88	July 12	@ Rangers	6–3	Rogers (5–6)	Astacio (6–10)	Zimmerman (13)	29,322	39–49
89	July 13	@ Rangers	10–2	Helling (6–8)	Hampton (9–6)		37,812	39–50
90	July 14	@ Rangers	11–2	Chacón (5–5)	Davis (4–7)		38,009	40–50
91	July 15	@ Athletics	6–3	Lidle (3–4)	Bohanon (4–5)	Vizcaíno (1)	24,327	40–51
92	July 16	@ Athletics	5–1	Heredia (5–7)	Neagle (6–3)		13,808	40–52
93	July 17	@ Athletics	3–2	Mulder (11–6)	Astacio (6–11)	Isringhausen (19)	22,099	40–53
94	July 18	@ Giants	10–0	Ortiz (11–5)	Hampton (9–7)		41,584	40–54
95	July 19	@ Giants	2–1	Rodríguez (5–1)	Acevedo (0–2)		40,850	40–55
96	July 20	Dodgers	11–3	Bohanon (5–5)	Prokopec (6–5)		47,704	41–55
97	July 21	Dodgers	22–7	Gagné (3–4)	Neagle (6–4)		43,011	41–56
98	July 22	Dodgers	9–8	Adams (6–3)	Astacio (6–12)	Shaw (28)	40,085	41–57
99	July 23	Giants	8–2	Hampton (10–7)	Ortiz (11–6)		37,424	42–57
100	July 24	Giants	6–4	Chacón (6–5)	Estes (7–5)	Jiménez (13)	40,132	43–57
101	July 25	Giants	9–3	Jensen (1–2)	Bohanon (5–6)		42,088	43–58
102	July 26	@ Dodgers	3–1	Gagné (4–4)	Neagle (6–5)	Shaw (30)	32,750	43–59
103	July 27	@ Dodgers	4–2	Adams (7–3)	Astacio (6–13)	Shaw (31)	40,114	43–60
104	July 28	@ Dodgers	10–6	Park (11–6)	Hampton (10–8)	Shaw (32)	34,808	43–61
105	July 29	@ Dodgers	3–2	Powell (3–2)	Herges (8–8)	Jiménez (14)	54,556	44–61
106	July 31	Phillies	7–6	Jiménez (5–1)	Cormier (5–5)		36,005	45–61

August

#	Date	Opponent	Score	Win	Loss	Save	Attendance	Record
107	August 1	Phillies	8–1 (6)	Wolf (6–10)	Neagle (6–6)		34,024	45–62
108	August 2	Phillies	4–2	Coggin (2–1)	Thomson (0–4)	Mesa (28)	37,075	45–63
109	August 3	Pirates	12–7	Hampton (11–8)	Anderson (6–11)		38,836	46–63
110	August 4	Pirates	6–3	Ritchie (8–10)	Chacón (6–6)		44,294	46–64
111	August 5	Pirates	5–4	Lincoln (1–0)	Bohanon (5–7)	Fetters (2)	36,570	46–65
112	August 7	@ Cubs	5–4	Farnsworth (2–3)	Speier (2–1)		40,266	46–66
113	August 8	@ Cubs	2–1	Bere (8–5)	Thomson (0–5)	Gordon (23)	38,801	46–67
114	August 9	@ Cubs	14–5	Hampton (12–8)	Tavárez (8–8)		38,345	47–67
115	August 10	@ Reds	16–7	Miceli (1–5)	Reitsma (5–12)		22,778	48–67
116	August 11	@ Reds	7–3	Acevedo (3–3)	Bohanon (5–8)		28,751	48–68
117	August 12	@ Reds	7–6	Powell (4–2)	Graves (5–4)	Jiménez (15)	23,887	49–68
118	August 14	Braves	5–4 (10)	Jiménez (6–1)	Karsay (1–3)		40,677	50–68
119	August 15	Braves	7–2	Burkett (10–8)	Hampton (12–9)		37,962	50–69
120	August 16	Braves	4–1	Millwood (3–5)	Chacón (6–7)	Karsay (7)	37,086	50–70
121	August 17	Marlins	12–5	Speier (3–1)	Dempster (14–10)		35,512	51–70
122	August 18	Marlins	8–3	Neagle (7–6)	Almanza (1–2)	Powell (1)	39,073	52–70
123	August 19	Marlins	6–5	Thomson (1–5)	Sánchez (2–3)	Miceli (1)	34,525	53–70
124	August 21	@ Mets	5–2	Leiter (8–10)	Hampton (12–10)	Benítez (30)	28,510	53–71
125	August 22	@ Mets	2–1	Appier (7–10)	Chacón (6–8)	Benítez (31)	34,415	53–72
126	August 23	@ Mets	10–0	Jennings (1–0)	Rusch (6–9)		27,430	54–72
127	August 24	@ Brewers	12–6	Neagle (8–6)	Neugebauer (1–1)		40,647	55–72
128	August 25	@ Brewers	5–4	DeJean (4–2)	White (1–7)	Leskanic (15)	42,139	55–73
129	August 26	@ Brewers	3–2	Hampton (13–10)	Quevedo (3–2)	Powell (2)	42,239	56–73
130	August 28	@ Dodgers	4–3	Davis (1–3)	Shaw (3–4)	Powell (3)	39,051	57–73
131	August 29	@ Dodgers	5–3	Jennings (2–0)	Baldwin (9–7)	Powell (4)	27,697	58–73
132	August 30	@ Dodgers	5–4	Park (13–9)	Neagle (8–7)	Shaw (38)	36,254	58–74
133	August 31	@ Giants	5–2	Thomson (2–5)	Ortiz (14–8)	Powell (5)	41,081	59–74

September

#	Date	Opponent	Score	Win	Loss	Save	Attendance	Record
134	September 1	@ Giants	2–1	Nen (4–3)	Speier (3–2)		41,034	59–75
135	September 2	@ Giants	3–1	Hernández (12–13)	Chacón (6–9)	Nen (38)	41,812	59–76
136	September 3	@ Giants	4–1	Jennings (3–0)	Rueter (12–11)	Powell (6)	41,528	60–76
137	September 4	Dodgers	5–2	Neagle (9–7)	Baldwin (9–8)	Powell (7)	30,455	61–76
138	September 5	Dodgers	7–2	Herges (9–8)	Myers (1–3)		31,791	61–77
139	September 6	Dodgers	9–5	Adams (12–6)	Hampton (13–11)		31,407	61–78
140	September 7	Giants	3–2 (12)	Miceli (2–5)	Worrell (2–3)		33,473	62–78
141	September 8	Giants	7–3	Rueter (13–11)	Jennings (3–1)		32,825	62–79
142	September 9	Giants	9–4 (11)	Gomes (6–3)	Belitz (0–1)		36,862	62–80
143	September 17	Diamondbacks	7–3	Johnson (19–6)	Davis (1–4)		31,111	62–81
144	September 18	Diamondbacks	10–9	Myers (2–3)	Kim (5–6)		30,552	63–81
145	September 19	Diamondbacks	8–2	Hampton (14–11)	Lopez (8–18)		30,301	64–81
146	September 20	@ Expos	8–3	Lloyd (9–5)	Powell (4–3)		3,307	64–82
147	September 21	@ Expos	11–9 (11)	Davis (2–4)	Mota (1–3)		10,510	65–82
148	September 22	@ Expos	3–1	Yoshii (4–5)	Elarton (4–9)	Strickland (6)	9,707	65–83
149	September 23	@ Expos	5–3	Speier (4–2)	Stewart (1–1)	Jiménez (16)	9,282	66–83
150	September 24	Padres	15–11	Speier (5–2)	Lundquist (0–1)		30,774	67–83
151	September 25	Padres	8–7	Tollberg (8–4)	Hampton (14–12)	Hoffman (40)	31,193	67–84
152	September 26	Padres	3–1	Lawrence (5–4)	Speier (5–3)	Hoffman (41)	30,711	67–85
153	September 27	Padres	13–9	Belitz (1–1)	Herndon (2–6)		31,162	68–85
154	September 28	Brewers	6–5	Powell (5–3)	Leskanic (2–6)		44,109	69–85
155	September 29	Brewers	14–12	Speier (6–3)	Haynes (8–16)	Jiménez (17)	35,848	70–85
156	September 30	Brewers	10–0	Thomson (3–5)	D'Amico (2–4)		31,545	71–85

October

#	Date	Opponent	Score	Win	Loss	Save	Attendance	Record
157	October 2	@ Diamondbacks	10–1	Johnson (21–6)	Hampton (14–13)		36,263	71–86
158	October 3	@ Diamondbacks	4–3	Schilling (22–6)	Chacón (6–10)	Kim (18)	32,521	71–87
159	October 4	@ Diamondbacks	5–4	Anderson (4–9)	Neagle (9–8)	Kim (19)	29,382	71–88
160	October 5	@ Padres	4–0	Jennings (4–1)	Jarvis (12–11)		27,646	72–88
161	October 6	@ Padres	10–4	Tollberg (10–4)	Elarton (4–10)		30,637	72–89
162	October 7	@ Padres	14–5	Thomson (4–5)	Lawrence (5–5)		60,103	73–89

== Player stats ==
= Indicates team leader

=== Batting ===
==== Starters by position ====
Note: Pos = Position; G = Games played; AB = At bats; H = Hits; Avg. = Batting average; HR = Home runs; RBI = Runs batted in

Pos	Player	G	AB	H	Avg.	HR	RBI
C	Ben Petrick	85	244	58	.238	11	39
1B	Todd Helton	159	587	197	.336	49	146
2B	Todd Walker	85	290	86	.297	12	43
SS	Neifi Pérez	87	382	114	.298	7	47
3B	Jeff Cirillo	138	528	165	.313	17	83
LF	Ron Gant	59	171	44	.257	8	22
CF	Juan Pierre	156	617	202	.327	2	55
RF	Larry Walker	142	497	174	.350	38	123

==== Other batters ====
Note: G = Games played; AB = At bats; H = Hits; Avg. = Batting average; HR = Home runs; RBI = Runs batted in

Player	G	AB	H	Avg.	HR	RBI
Juan Uribe	72	273	82	.300	8	53
Terry Shumpert	114	242	70	.289	4	24
Greg Norton	117	225	60	.267	13	40
José Ortiz	53	204	52	.255	13	35
Alex Ochoa	58	187	47	.251	1	17
Brent Mayne	49	160	53	.331	0	20
Brent Butler	53	119	29	.244	1	14
Todd Hollandsworth	33	117	43	.368	6	19
Mark Little	51	85	29	.341	3	13
Jacob Cruz	44	76	16	.211	1	7
Adam Melhuse	40	71	13	.183	1	8
Sal Fasano	25	63	16	.254	3	9
Mario Encarnación	20	62	14	.226	0	3
Gary Bennett	19	55	15	.273	1	4
Brooks Kieschnick	35	42	10	.238	3	9
Cliff Brumbaugh	14	36	10	.278	1	4
Kimera Bartee	12	15	0	.000	0	1
Robin Jennings	1	3	0	.000	0	0
Kevin Sefcik	1	1	0	.000	0	0

=== Pitching ===
==== Starting pitchers ====
Note: G = Games pitched; IP = Innings pitched; W = Wins; L = Losses; ERA = Earned run average; SO = Strikeouts

Player	G	IP	W	L	ERA	SO
Mike Hampton	32	203.0	14	13	5.41	122
Denny Neagle	30	170.2	9	8	5.38	139
Shawn Chacón	27	160.0	6	10	5.06	134
Pedro Astacio	22	141.0	6	13	5.49	125
Brian Bohanon	20	97.0	5	8	7.14	47
John Thomson	14	93.2	4	5	4.04	68
Jason Jennings	7	39.1	4	1	4.58	26
Scott Elarton	4	23.0	0	2	6.65	11

==== Other pitchers ====
Note: G = Games pitched; IP = Innings pitched; W = Wins; L = Losses; ERA = Earned run average; SO = Strikeouts

Player	G	IP	W	L	ERA	SO
Ron Villone	22	46.2	1	3	6.36	48
Mac Suzuki	3	6.1	0	2	15.63	5

==== Relief pitchers ====
Note: G = Games pitched; W = Wins; L = Losses; SV = Saves; ERA = Earned run average; SO = Strikeouts

Player	G	W	L	SV	ERA	SO
José Jiménez	56	6	1	17	4.09	37
Mike Myers	73	2	3	0	3.60	36
Gabe White	69	1	7	0	6.25	47
Kane Davis	57	2	4	0	4.35	47
Justin Speier	42	4	3	0	3.70	47
Jay Powell	39	3	1	7	2.79	26
Juan Acevedo	39	0	2	0	5.63	26
Dan Miceli	22	2	0	1	2.21	17
John Wasdin	18	2	1	0	7.03	17
Todd Belitz	8	1	1	0	7.71	5
Bobby Chouinard	8	0	0	0	8.22	5
Joe Davenport	7	0	0	0	3.48	8
Craig Dingman	7	0	0	0	13.50	2
Chris Nichting	7	0	0	0	4.50	7
Horacio Estrada	4	1	1	0	14.54	4
Tim Christman	1	0	0	0	4.50	2

== Farm system ==
Level	Team	League	Manager
AAA	Colorado Springs Sky Sox	Pacific Coast League	Chris Cron
AA	Carolina Mudcats	Southern League	Ron Gideon
A	Salem Avalanche	Carolina League	Dave Collins
A	Asheville Tourists	South Atlantic League	Joe Mikulik
A-Short Season	Tri-City Dust Devils	Northwest League	Stu Cole
Rookie	Casper Rockies	Pioneer League	P. J. Carey

LEAGUE CHAMPIONS: Salem

Records
Preceded by 2000	Colorado Rockies seasons 2001	Succeeded by 2002
