= Neifi Pérez =

Dominican baseball player (born 1973)

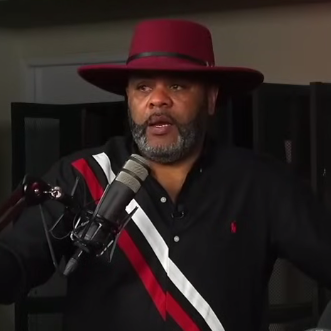
- Pérez in 2024
- Shortstop
- Born: June 2, 1973 (age 53); Villa Mella, Dominican Republic
- Batted: Switch Threw: Right

MLB debut
- August 31, 1996, for the Colorado Rockies

Last MLB appearance
- July 5, 2007, for the Detroit Tigers

MLB statistics
- Batting average: .267
- Home runs: 64
- Runs batted in: 489
- Stats at Baseball Reference

Teams
- Colorado Rockies (1996–2001); Kansas City Royals (2001–2002); San Francisco Giants (2003–2004); Chicago Cubs (2004–2006); Detroit Tigers (2006–2007)

Career highlights and awards
- Gold Glove Award (2000)

Neifi Neftali Pérez (/ˈneɪfi, ˈnɛfi/; Spanish: [ˈnejfi]; born June 2, 1973) is a Dominican former Major League baseball player. He was a switch hitter who threw right-handed. During his career, he played with the Colorado Rockies, Kansas City Royals, San Francisco Giants, Chicago Cubs, and Detroit Tigers.

Pérez was originally signed by the Colorado Rockies in 1992. Frequently praised for his defensive skills, Pérez reached the major leagues in 1996 and became the Rockies' shortstop for good in 1997. Over the next three years, he scarcely missed a game and won a Gold Glove in 2000. In 2001, he was traded to the Kansas City Royals, where he also played in 2002. The trade proved to be unpopular with both teams, and Pérez joined the San Francisco Giants for 2003 and 2004. He lost his starting job during the 2004 season and was released during that year. Pérez then signed with the Chicago Cubs, whom he finished the season with and spent most of the next two years with. He was the Cubs' starting shortstop in 2005 but was used as a reserve player in 2006 before getting traded to the Detroit Tigers during the year. He finished his career in 2007 with the Tigers. As a Tiger, he turned a double play which saved Justin Verlander's no-hitter, but he also had a series of positive tests for amphetamines which effectively ended his career.

== Career ==
=== Colorado Rockies ===
As a child, Pérez played for Liga Mercedes in the Dominican Republic. The Colorado Rockies signed him as an undrafted free agent in 1992 at the age of 18. Assigned to the single-A Bend Rockies for the 1993 season, Pérez posted a .260 batting average and stole 19 bases. The Rockies, confident in Pérez's potential, promoted him to the single-A Central Valley Rockies. Pérez exhibited strong defensive skills, executing the first unassisted triple play in the history of the California League in a game against the Bakersfield Blaze. Pérez batted just .239 on the year but made the California League All-Star game and was considered to be one of the Rockies' top prospects on the basis of his defense. Rockies player development chief Dick Balderson expressed confidence that Pérez's hitting would improve: "He's got all the skills...He's just in a rush right now, like most young guys."

Pérez moved up to the double-AA New Haven Ravens where he batted .253 and improved his fielding percentage to .967 and was considered the Rockies' top prospect at shortstop. The Rockies promoted Pérez to triple-A Colorado Springs Sky Sox at the end of the 1995 season with the intention of bringing him up to the major leagues the next year. In fact, although Pérez was invited to 1996 spring training, he spent most of year with the Sky Sox and was not called up until the end of August, making his major league debut on August 31. In his season with the Sky Sox, his batting average had improved to .316. Commented Rockies manager Don Baylor: "He is the guy who had the year that traditionally earns a call up. I want to see what he can do." Pérez hit .156 over 17 games and returned to the Sky Sox for the beginning of the 1997 season.

Although invited to 1997 spring training Pérez did not make the 25-man roster and once again returned to the Sky Sox for the first half of the season, where he batted .363 with a .975 fielding percentage. In mid-June the Rockies summoned him in place of Jason Bates, this time for good. Pérez batted .291 on the year and gradually replaced Walt Weiss as the starting shortstop. Pérez remained Colorado's primary shortstop for the next three seasons (1998–2000), appearing in all but five games. His batting average hovered around .280 (.274, .280, .287) and he averaged thirty doubles a year. He led all National League shortstops in assists in all three seasons. His fielding percentage never dropped below .975 and he won a Gold Glove for the 2000 season. Despite his later reputation for anemic hitting, Pérez managed several offensive feats with the Rockies. On July 25, 1998, he hit for the cycle against the St. Louis Cardinals. In 1999 he tied Bobby Abreu and José Offerman for the most triples in Major League Baseball with 11. Pérez got off to a strong start in 2001 but there was doubt over his future with Colorado. The Rockies had offered him a 4-year, $17 million contract which he had rejected; accepting a 1-year $3.55 million deal via arbitration. In the end the Rockies dealt Pérez to the Kansas City Royals as part of a three-way deal in which the Royals sent Jermaine Dye to the Oakland Athletics who then sent Mario Encarnación, José Ortiz and Todd Belitz to Colorado. Denver Post sportswriter Woody Paige criticized the move, calling Pérez "the best shortstop in the National League" who was "an extraordinary defensive player, a capable offensive player and a classy team player."

=== Kansas City Royals ===
Pérez arrived in Kansas City amid widespread anger over the departure of fan-favorite Dye. Facing off against Dye in one of his first games as a Royal, Pérez took the low-key approach: "I'm just going to play my game." Pérez finished out the 2001 season in Kansas City, batting .241 over 49 games. Pérez started at shortstop for the 2002 season but his batting average sank to .236, leading sportswriters to question whether the rarefied air at Coors Field had inflated Pérez's numbers. Pérez also may have sealed his fate by refusing to enter a late-season game at the request of manager Tony Peña. At the end of the year the Royals were looking to move Pérez and his $4.1 million salary; he was eventually claimed off waivers by the San Francisco Giants and signed a two-year, $4.25 million contract.

=== San Francisco Giants ===
At the Giants Pérez hoped for a fresh start; rumors had swirled in Kansas City about problems in the clubhouse, and it was no secret that the trade had been deeply unpopular in both Denver and Kansas City. Commented Pérez: "I feel happy here. I like the National League. I was happy in Colorado and I am happy here." Pérez hit .256 over the course of the 2003 season; an improvement on his previous season but a far cry from the Colorado days. Pérez returned for the 2004 season, but the situation in San Francisco had become uncomfortable. Although signed as a starter at second base, he quickly became backup to Ray Durham, while he lost out at shortstop to Deivi Cruz. His batting average slumped to .232. He had a staunch defender in manager Felipe Alou, but in the end he was the "odd man out" and the Giants released him on August 14, 2004. Almost immediately the Chicago Cubs signed Pérez to a minor-league contract.

=== Chicago Cubs ===
The Cubs assigned Pérez to the triple-A Iowa Cubs, but he played only ten games before being called up to the expanded roster on September 1. Pérez became a much needed spark plug in the lineup, going 6 for 6 in his first 6 at-bats as a Cub and providing a needed backup to the ailing Nomar Garciaparra. In 23 games with the Cubs he hit .371. The Cubs re-signed Pérez to a one-year contract worth $1 million, with up to an additional $1.5 million in bonuses.

Manager Dusty Baker made Pérez the everyday shortstop in 2005 to replace Garciaparra, mainly on the strength of his defensive skills. His impatience at the plate led to a walk percentage of 3.1%, the worst in the National League. Pérez finished the season batting .274, and his play at short won rave reviews from Baker: "It's hard to play better shortstop defensively than Neifi has." In the off-season the Cubs signed Pérez to a two-year, $5 million contract.

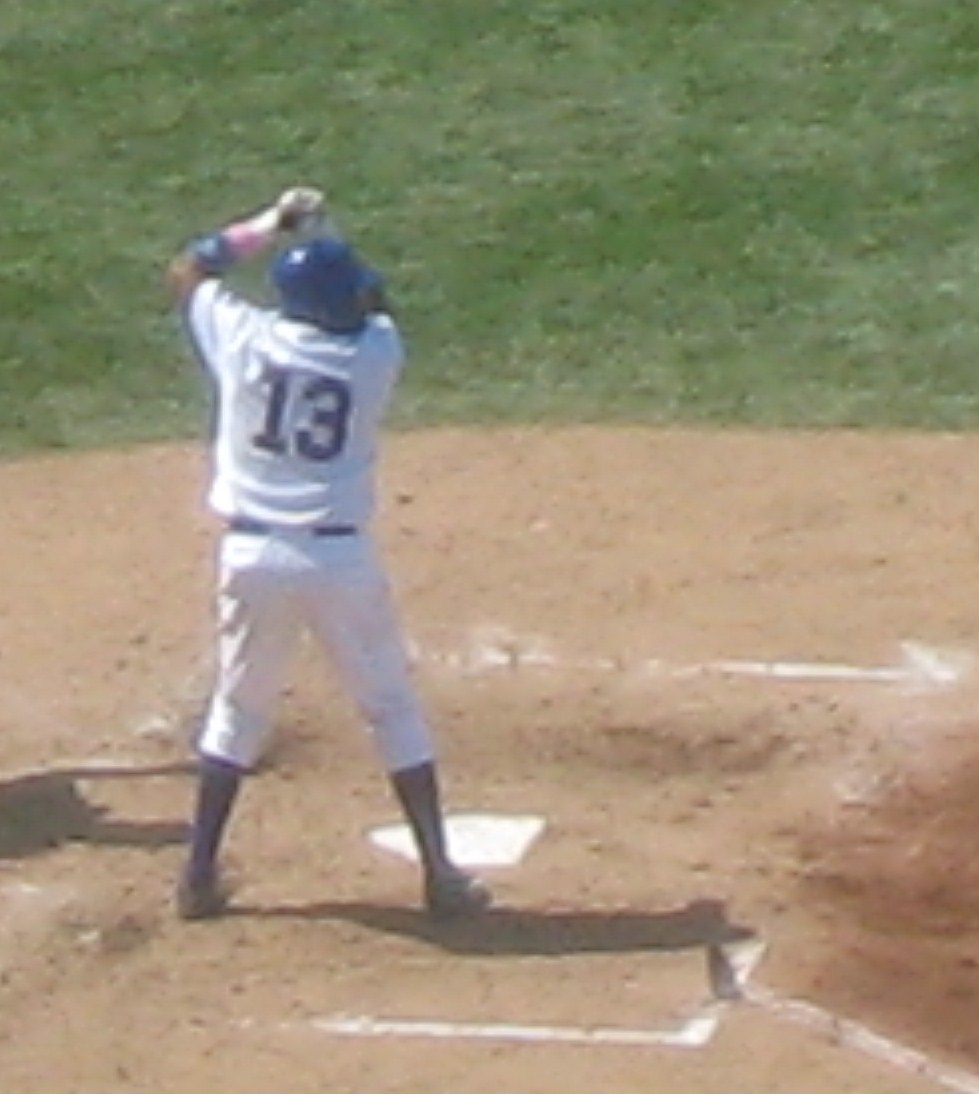
Pérez with the Chicago Cubs in 2006

For the 2006 season Pérez lost the starting job at shortstop to Ronny Cedeño, and found himself playing a mixture of second base and short behind Cedeño and Todd Walker. Meanwhile, Pérez's batting average sagged to .254, while his on-base percentage, never high, had fallen to .266. In late August the Cubs traded him to the Detroit Tigers for minor-league catcher Chris Robinson. The Tigers were seeking a replacement for their injured second baseman, Plácido Polanco, who had separated his shoulder.

=== Detroit Tigers ===
Pérez arrived in Detroit during the pennant chase which ended with their loss in the 2006 World Series to the St. Louis Cardinals. Pérez faced almost immediate criticism from fans after getting off to a .157 start, and manager Jim Leyland felt obliged to come to his defense: "These guys making a big deal about Neifi Pérez and Omar Infante don't know what they're talking about. They got no clue." Pérez made 21 appearances during the regular season, with a batting average of .200 and an OBP of .235. He appeared in three games during the playoffs but never reached base.

The Tigers retained Pérez for the 2007 season, although Leyland acknowledged that Pérez would have to improve his play: "I recommended that we trade for him. I take responsibility. I don't want people to get the wrong impression. I like Neifi Pérez, but he did not perform well. It's that simple." Pérez, however, continued to struggle, posting a .172 batting average over the 33 games he played in a Tigers' uniform. One bright spot came on June 12, 2007, when he saved Justin Verlander's no-hitter against the Milwaukee Brewers by turning a possible base hit into an inning-ending double play.

On July 6, 2007, Pérez was suspended 25 games by MLB for a second positive test for amphetamines; on August 3 he was suspended an additional 80 games for a third positive test. His suspensions for amphetamines were the first two handed out to any player after MLB outlawed them prior to the 2006 season. On October 31, 2007, Pérez filed for free agency, ending his association with Detroit.

=== Possible comeback ===
In February 2008 there was talk of the Colorado Rockies signing Pérez to a minor league contract worth $750,000, which manager Clint Hurdle characterized as a "lifeline." In the end Colorado backed out, citing younger players competing for the same position.

== Foreign ==
Pérez has also had a significant foreign career. He participated in the Caribbean Series and was named the Series MVP in 1998 and 1999. In 2012, he was inducted into the Caribbean Baseball Hall of Fame. He played in the Dominican Professional Baseball League for Leones del Escogido with personal success, batting over .300. In 2004, he helped Escogido score 18 runs in an inning. In 2006, he played in the Dominican Republic-Puerto Rico All-Star Game.

== Legacy ==
Pérez's poor offense after Colorado traded him to the Royals overshadowed his defensive skills. He was widely criticized because of his low on-base percentage (career .297) and lack of power. Nate Silver, a baseball statistician who analyzed Pérez's statistics (specifically value over replacement player (VORP)), concluded that Pérez had a negative impact on the teams he played for. Chicago sportswriter Bruce Miles called Pérez "one of the worst offensive players in baseball history."

== Personal life ==
Neifi Pérez's older brother Rubby Pérez was a merengue singer who died in the Jet Set nightclub roof collapse.

== See also ==
- List of Major League Baseball players to hit for the cycle
- List of Colorado Rockies team records
- List of Major League Baseball annual triples leaders
- List of sportspeople sanctioned for doping offences

Achievements
Preceded by Dante Bichette	Hitting for the cycle July 25, 1998	Succeeded by Jeff Kent
