= 2001 Chicago Cubs season =

2001 Chicago Cubs
- League: National League
- Division: Central
- Ballpark: Wrigley Field
- City: Chicago
- Record: 88–74 (.543)
- Divisional place: 3rd
- Owners: Tribune Company
- General managers: Andy MacPhail
- Managers: Don Baylor
- Television: WCIU/Superstation WGN (Chip Caray, Joe Carter); FSN Chicago (Chip Caray, Dave Otto)
- Radio: WGN (Pat Hughes, Ron Santo)
- Stats: ESPN.com; Baseball Reference

The 2001 Chicago Cubs season was the 130th season of the Chicago Cubs franchise, the 126th in the National League and the 86th at Wrigley Field. The Cubs finished third in the National League Central with a record of 88–74.

== Offseason ==
- November 18, 2000: Bill Mueller was traded by the San Francisco Giants to the Chicago Cubs for Tim Worrell.
- December 18, 2000: Jason Bere was signed as a free agent with the Chicago Cubs.
- December 19, 2000: Todd Hundley signed as a free agent with the Chicago Cubs.
- January 10, 2001: Ron Coomer was signed as a free agent with the Chicago Cubs.

== Regular season ==
During a forgettable 2000 season, Jim Hendry sent pitcher Scott Downs to Montreal and acquired Rondell White. This laid the groundwork for the 2001 season, which saw the North Siders make another drive for the playoffs. Mack Newton was brought in by the club to preach "positive mental thought", and it paid off. Matt Stairs started the season at first base, but ultimately the Cubs made a mid-June trade to acquire All-Star 1B Fred McGriff, though McGriff took over a month debating whether or not to approve the deal and leave his hometown Tampa Bay Devil Rays, ultimately waiving his no-trade clause and allow himself to be dealt to Chicago on July 27. "The Crime Dog" hit a respectable .282 with 12 homers in 49 games with the Cubs, hitting cleanup behind Sammy Sosa, who had perhaps his best season, hitting 64 homers with career highs in batting average (.328) and RBI (160) for Don Baylor's club. Jon Lieber had a 20 win season, and along with Kevin Tapani and Kerry Wood made up a solid rotation. The Cubs led the eventual Wild Card winning Cardinals by 2.5 games in early September, but Preston Wilson's walk-off homer off of closer Tom "Flash" Gordon took the wind out of the team's sails, failing to make another serious charge. The Cubs did manage to finish 88–74, only 5 games behind both St. Louis and Houston, who tied for first. One of the season's most memorable moments came on September 27, when Sammy Sosa carried an American flag around the bases after hitting a home run in the Cubs first home game since the September 11 attacks.

=== Season standings ===
NL Central
Team	W	L	Pct.	GB	Home	Road
Houston Astros	93	69	.574	—	44‍–‍37	49‍–‍32
St. Louis Cardinals	93	69	.574	—	54‍–‍28	39‍–‍41
Chicago Cubs	88	74	.543	5	48‍–‍33	40‍–‍41
Milwaukee Brewers	68	94	.420	25	36‍–‍45	32‍–‍49
Cincinnati Reds	66	96	.407	27	27‍–‍54	39‍–‍42
Pittsburgh Pirates	62	100	.383	31	38‍–‍43	24‍–‍57

==== Record vs. opponents ====
2001 National League record Source: MLB Standings Grid – 2001
Team	AZ	ATL	CHC	CIN	COL	FLA	HOU	LAD	MIL	MON	NYM	PHI	PIT	SD	SF	STL	AL
Arizona	—	5–2	6–3	5–1	13–6	4–2	2–4	10–9	3–3	3–3	3–3	3–4	4–2	12–7	10–9	2–4	7–8
Atlanta	2–5	—	4–2	4–2	4–2	9–10	3–3	2–5	3–3	13–6	10–9	10–9	5–1	3–3	4–2	3–3	9–9
Chicago	3–6	2–4	—	13–4	3–3	3–3	8–9	4–2	8–9	3–3	4–2	4–2	10–6	2–4	3–3	9–8	9–6
Cincinnati	1–5	2–4	4–13	—	3–6	4–2	6–11	4–2	6–10	4–2	4–2	2–4	9–8	2–4	4–2	7–10	4–11
Colorado	6–13	2–4	3–3	6–3	—	4–2	2–4	8–11	5–1	3–4	4–3	2–4	2–4	9–10	9–10	6–3	2–10
Florida	2–4	10–9	3–3	2–4	2–4	—	3–3	2–5	4–2	12–7	7–12	5–14	4–2	3–4	2–4	3–3	12–6
Houston	4–2	3–3	9–8	11–6	4–2	3–3	—	2–4	12–5	6–0	3–3	3–3	9–8	3–6	3–3	9–7	9–6
Los Angeles	9–10	5–2	2–4	2–4	11–8	5–2	4–2	—	5–1	2–4	2–4	3–3	7–2	9–10	11–8	3–3	6–9
Milwaukee	3–3	3–3	9–8	10–6	1–5	2–4	5–12	1–5	—	4–2	3–3	3–3	6–11	1–5	5–4	7–10	5–10
Montreal	3–3	6–13	3–3	2–4	4–3	7–12	0–6	4–2	2–4	—	8–11	9–10	5–1	3–3	2–5	2–4	8–10
New York	3–3	9–10	2–4	2–4	3–4	12–7	3–3	4–2	3–3	11–8	—	11–8	4–2	1–5	3–4	1–5	10–8
Philadelphia	4–3	9–10	2–4	4–2	4–2	14–5	3–3	3–3	3–3	10–9	8–11	—	5–1	5–2	3–3	2–4	7–11
Pittsburgh	2–4	1–5	6–10	8–9	4–2	2–4	8–9	2–7	11–6	1–5	2–4	1–5	—	2–4	1–5	3–14	8–7
San Diego	7–12	3–3	4–2	4–2	10–9	4–3	6–3	10–9	5–1	3–3	5–1	2–5	4–2	—	5–14	1–5	6–9
San Francisco	9–10	2–4	3–3	2–4	10–9	4–2	3–3	8–11	4–5	5–2	4–3	3–3	5–1	14–5	—	4–2	10–5
St. Louis	4–2	3–3	8–9	10–7	3–6	3–3	7–9	3–3	10–7	4–2	5–1	4–2	14–3	5–1	2–4	—	8–7

=== Transactions ===
- July 4, 2001: Trenidad Hubbard was signed as a free agent with the Chicago Cubs.
- July 30, 2001: Dave Weathers was traded by the Milwaukee Brewers with Roberto Miniel (minors) to the Chicago Cubs for Ruben Quevedo and Pete Zoccolillo.
- September 10, 2001: Trenidad Hubbard was released by the Chicago Cubs.

==== Draft picks ====
- June 5, 2001: Mark Prior was drafted by the Chicago Cubs in the 1st round (2nd pick) of the 2001 amateur draft. Player signed August 23, 2001.
- June 5, 2001: Geovany Soto was drafted by the Chicago Cubs in the 11th round of the 2001 amateur draft. Player signed June 26, 2001.

=== Roster ===
2001 Chicago Cubs
Roster
Pitchers: 38 Manny Aybar; 46 Jason Bere; 48 Joe Borowski; 37 Scott Chiasson; 51 Juan Cruz; 55 Courtney Duncan; 44 Kyle Farnsworth; 13 Jeff Fassero; 31 Mike Fyhrie; 45 Tom Gordon; 94 Félix Heredia; 32 Jon Lieber; 54 Ron Mahay; 35 Will Ohman; 36 Kevin Tapani; 50 Julián Tavárez; 47 Todd Van Poppel; 49 David Weathers; 34 Kerry Wood; 38 Carlos Zambrano	Catchers: 27 Joe Girardi; 99,9 Todd Hundley; 72 Robert Machado; Infielders: 40 Miguel Cairo; 6 Ron Coomer; 16 Delino DeShields; 12 Ricky Gutiérrez; 29 Fred McGriff; 33 Bill Mueller; 1 Augie Ojeda; 56 Jason Smith; 30 Matt Stairs; 7 Eric Young; 15 Julio Zuleta; Outfielders: 28 Roosevelt Brown; 9 Damon Buford; 11 Todd Dunwoody; 19 Gary Matthews, Jr.; 40 Chad Meyers; 20 Corey Patterson; 21 Sammy Sosa; 24 Michael Tucker; 22 Rondell White	Manager: 25 Don Baylor; Coaching Staff: 8 Oscar Acosta (pitching); 2 Sandy Alomar Sr. (first base); 3 Gene Glynn (third base); 5 Rene Lachemann (bench); 4 Jeff Pentland (hitting); 26 Billy Williams (special asst)

== Player stats ==
=== Batting ===
==== Starters by position ====
Note: Pos = Position; G = Games played; AB = At bats; H = Hits; Avg. = Batting average; HR = Home runs; RBI = Runs batted in

Pos	Player	G	AB	H	Avg.	HR	RBI
C	Todd Hundley	79	246	46	.187	12	31
1B	Matt Stairs	128	340	85	.250	17	61
2B	Eric Young	149	603	168	.279	6	42
3B	Ron Coomer	147	528	153	.290	8	53
SS	Ricky Gutiérrez	111	349	91	.261	10	66
LF	Rondell White	95	323	99	.307	17	50
CF	Gary Matthews	106	258	56	.217	9	30
RF	Sammy Sosa	160	577	189	.328	64	160

==== Other batters ====
Note: G = Games played; AB = At bats; H = Hits; Avg. = Batting average; HR = Home runs; RBI = Runs batted in

Player	G	AB	H	Avg.	HR	RBI
Joe Girardi	78	229	58	.253	3	25
Bill Mueller	70	210	62	.295	6	23
Michael Tucker	63	205	54	.263	5	31
Fred McGriff	49	170	48	.282	12	41
Delino DeShields	68	163	45	.276	2	16
Augie Ojeda	78	144	29	.201	1	12
Robert Machado	52	135	30	.222	2	13
Corey Patterson	59	131	29	.221	4	14
Miguel Cairo	66	123	35	.285	2	9
Julio Zuleta	49	106	23	.217	6	24
Damon Buford	35	85	15	.176	3	8
Roosevelt Brown	39	83	22	.265	4	22
Todd Dunwoody	33	61	13	.213	1	3
Chad Meyers	18	17	2	.118	0	0
Jason Smith	2	1	0	.000	0	0

=== Pitching ===
==== Starting pitchers ====
Note: G = Games pitched; IP = Innings pitched; W = Wins; L = Losses; ERA = Earned run average; SO = Strikeouts

Player	G	IP	W	L	ERA	SO
Jon Lieber	34	232.1	20	6	3.80	148
Jason Bere	32	188.0	11	11	4.31	175
Kerry Wood	28	174.1	12	6	3.36	217
Kevin Tapani	29	168.1	9	14	4.49	149
Julián Tavárez	34	161.1	10	9	4.52	107
Juan Cruz	8	44.2	3	1	3.22	39
Joe Borowski	1	1.2	0	1	32.40	1

==== Other pitchers ====
Note: G = Games pitched; IP = Innings pitched; W = Wins; L = Losses; ERA = Earned run average; SO = Strikeouts

Player	G	IP	W	L	ERA	SO
Carlos Zambrano	6	7.2	1	2	15.26	4

==== Relief pitchers ====
Note: G = Games pitched; W = Wins; L = Losses; SV = Saves; ERA = Earned run average; SO = Strikeouts

Player	G	W	L	SV	ERA	SO
Tom Gordon	47	1	2	27	3.38	67
Jeff Fassero	82	4	4	12	3.42	79
Kyle Farnsworth	76	4	6	2	2.74	107
Todd Van Poppel	59	4	1	0	2.52	90
Félix Heredia	48	2	2	0	6.17	28
Courtney Duncan	36	3	3	0	5.06	49
David Weathers	28	1	1	0	3.18	20
Manny Aybar	17	2	1	0	6.35	16
Ron Mahay	17	0	0	0	2.61	24
Mike Fyhrie	15	0	2	0	4.20	6
Will Ohman	11	0	1	0	7.71	12
Scott Chiasson	6	1	1	0	2.70	6

== Awards and records ==
- Sammy Sosa became the first player to hit at least 60 home runs in three different seasons.

== Farm system ==
Level	Team	League	Manager
AAA	Iowa Cubs	Pacific Coast League	Bruce Kimm
AA	West Tenn Diamond Jaxx	Southern League	Dave Bialas
A	Daytona Cubs	Florida State League	Dave Trembley
A	Lansing Lugnuts	Midwest League	Julio Garcia
A-Short Season	Boise Hawks	Northwest League	Steve McFarland
Rookie	AZL Cubs	Arizona League	Carmelo Martínez
