= Jermaine Dye =

American baseball player (born 1974)

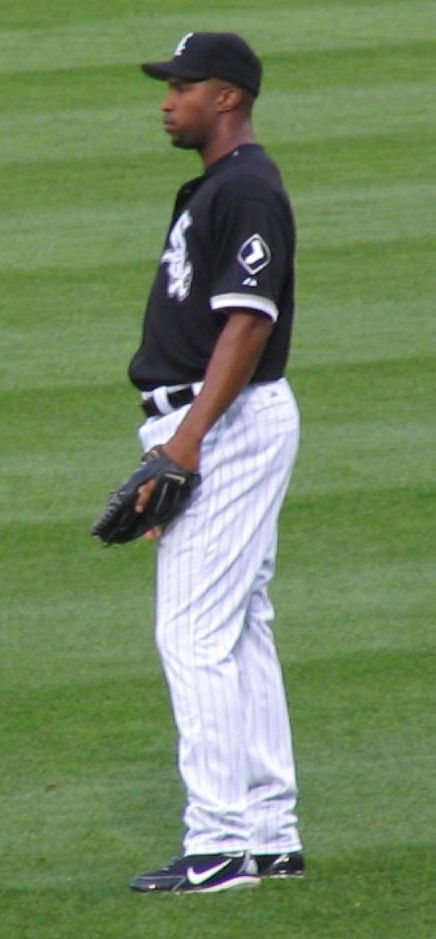
- Dye with the White Sox in 2007
- Right fielder
- Born: January 28, 1974 (age 52); Oakland, California, U.S.
- Batted: Right Threw: Right

MLB debut
- May 17, 1996, for the Atlanta Braves

Last MLB appearance
- October 4, 2009, for the Chicago White Sox

MLB statistics
- Batting average: .274
- Home runs: 325
- Runs batted in: 1,072
- Stats at Baseball Reference

Teams
- Atlanta Braves (1996); Kansas City Royals (1997–2001); Oakland Athletics (2001–2004); Chicago White Sox (2005–2009)

Career highlights and awards
- 2× All-Star (2000, 2006); World Series champion (2005); World Series MVP (2005); Gold Glove Award (2000); Silver Slugger Award (2006)

Jermaine Terrell Dye (born January 28, 1974) is an American former professional baseball right fielder. Dye played in Major League Baseball (MLB) for the Atlanta Braves (1996), Kansas City Royals (1997–2001), Oakland Athletics (2001–2004), and the Chicago White Sox (2005–2009).

Dye was a two-time MLB All-Star and he won the World Series Most Valuable Player Award with the White Sox at the end of the 2005 World Series. He won a Gold Glove Award in 2000 and a Silver Slugger Award in 2006. Dye batted and threw right-handed; in his prime, he was known for his ability to hit for power and his powerful throwing arm.

== Amateur career ==
Dye was a multi-sport star at Will C. Wood High School in Vacaville, California. Dye was originally selected by the Texas Rangers in the 43rd round (1,210th overall) of the 1992 Major League Baseball draft, but did not sign. Dye attended Cosumnes River College in Sacramento, where he played as a right fielder on a team that reached the playoffs.

== Professional career ==
=== Atlanta Braves ===
The Atlanta Braves selected Dye in the 17th round (488th overall) of the 1993 MLB draft. Dye made his Major League debut with the Braves on May 17, 1996, against the Cincinnati Reds, hitting a home run in his first Major League at-bat off Reds pitcher Marcus Moore. He played in 98 games with the Braves in 1996, batting .281 with 12 home runs and 37 RBI.

=== Kansas City Royals ===
Dye was traded along with pitcher Jamie Walker to the Kansas City Royals on March 27, 1997, in exchange for outfielder Michael Tucker and infielder Keith Lockhart. In 1999, Dye had a breakout season, and he finished the season batting .294 with 27 home runs and 119 RBI. He was one of the more well-liked Royals at that time, with fans frequently chanting "Dye-no-mite" after he came up to bat. In 2000, Dye batted a career-high .321 with 33 home runs and 118 RBI in 157 games, and he made the American League All-Star team for the first time. He began 2001 with a .272 average, 13 home runs and 47 RBI in 97 games with Kansas City.

=== Oakland Athletics ===
On July 25, 2001, the Oakland Athletics acquired Dye in a three-team trade that sent Neifi Pérez from the Colorado Rockies to the Royals and sent José Ortiz, Mario Encarnacion, and Todd Belitz to the Rockies. He chose to wear the jersey number 24, which would later be retired for Rickey Henderson. In 61 games with Oakland, Dye batted .297 with 13 home runs and 59 RBI. In October 2001, during the ALDS, Dye broke his leg when he fouled a ball off of his left knee.

On January 16, 2002, Dye signed a three-year, $32 million extension with the Athletics. In 2002, Dye hit .252 with 24 home runs and 86 RBI in 131 games. He struggled with injury in 2003, enduring two stints on the disabled list with knee and shoulder injuries. In 65 games that season, Dye hit .172 with four home runs and 20 RBI. He stayed healthy in 2004, batting .265 with 23 home runs and 80 RBI in 137 games. After the season, the Athletics non-tendered Dye, making him a free agent.

=== Chicago White Sox ===
On December 9, 2004, Dye was signed by the Chicago White Sox to a two-year, $10.15 million free-agent contract with an option for 2007.

He played 145 games in 2005, the most since his injury, including an appearance at first base and shortstop. He batted .274 with 31 home runs and 86 RBI, slugged .512 and stole 11 bases in regular season play, and was named World Series MVP, batting .438 with one home run and 3 RBI. His RBI single off Houston Astros closer Brad Lidge provided the deciding run in Chicago's 1–0 Game 4 victory, clinching the Series sweep.

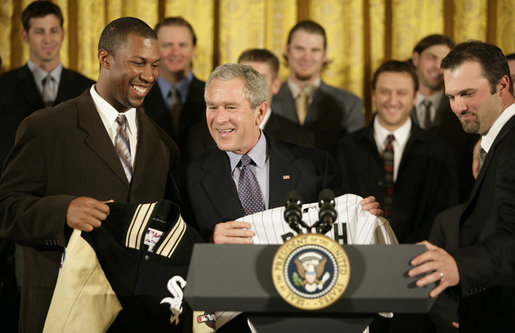
Dye with then-U.S. President George W. Bush.

2006 proved to be Dye's best offensive season; he finished second in the league with 44 home runs, third in slugging at .622, fifth in runs batted in with 120, batted .315, and placed fifth in AL Most Valuable Player voting. On Mother's Day, May 14, Dye was one of more than 50 hitters who used a pink bat to benefit the Breast Cancer Foundation. Dye was selected to the American League All-Star Team for the second time in his career after a scorching first half in which he batted .318, struck 25 home runs and slugged .646. Dye was also awarded a Silver Slugger for his offensive performance.

On October 30, 2006, the White Sox exercised their $6.75 million option for Dye's 2007 season.

Dye, along with many other Chicago hitters, struggled in the first half of 2007, including a cold June in which he batted just .203 with one home run. He turned his game around in the second half, batting .298 and knocking out 20 doubles and 16 home runs. Dye finished the season with a batting line of .254/.317/.486, and hit 28 home runs while recording 78 RBI in 138 games. On August 18, 2007, he signed a two-year, $22 million contract extension with the White Sox that included a mutual option for the 2010 season.

Dye returned to form in 2008 for the division champion White Sox, finishing tied for second in the American League with 77 extra-base hits and batting .292 with 34 home runs and 96 RBI in 154 games. Dye finished second to Tampa Bay's Evan Longoria in Final Vote balloting for the last spot on the American League All-Star roster.

In 2009, Dye had opposite effectiveness in the first and second halves of the season. Before the All-Star break, he hit .302 with 20 home runs and 55 RBIs, but afterwards, he hit .179 with seven home runs and 26 RBI. Overall, he finished the season batting .250 with 27 home runs and 81 RBI in 141 games. On November 6, 2009, Dye's $12 million mutual option was bought out for $950,000, making him a free agent.

On March 31, 2011, Dye announced his retirement.

== Career statistics ==
Years	Games	PA	AB	R	H	2B	3B	HR	RBI	BB	SO	AVG	OBP	SLG	FLD%
14	1763	7214	6487	984	1779	363	25	325	1072	597	1308	.274	.338	.488	.981

In the postseason, covering 44 games, Dye batted .270 (44-for-163) with 16 runs, nine doubles, five home runs, 17 RBI and 12 walks.

== See also ==
- List of Major League Baseball career home run leaders
- List of Major League Baseball career runs batted in leaders
- List of Major League Baseball players with a home run in their first major league at bat

Awards and achievements
Preceded by Albert Belle; Jim Thome	American League Player of the Month; April 2000; August 2001	Succeeded by Edgar Martínez; Eric Chavez
