= 2001 San Diego Padres season =

2001 San Diego Padres
- League: National League
- Division: West
- Ballpark: Qualcomm Stadium
- City: San Diego, California
- Record: 79–83 (.488)
- Divisional place: 4th
- Owners: John Moores
- General managers: Kevin Towers
- Managers: Bruce Bochy
- Television: KUSI-TV; 4SD (Mark Grant, Mel Proctor, Bob Chandler, Rick Sutcliffe)
- Radio: KOGO (Jerry Coleman, Ted Leitner); KURS (Rene Mora, Juan Avila, Eduardo Ortega)

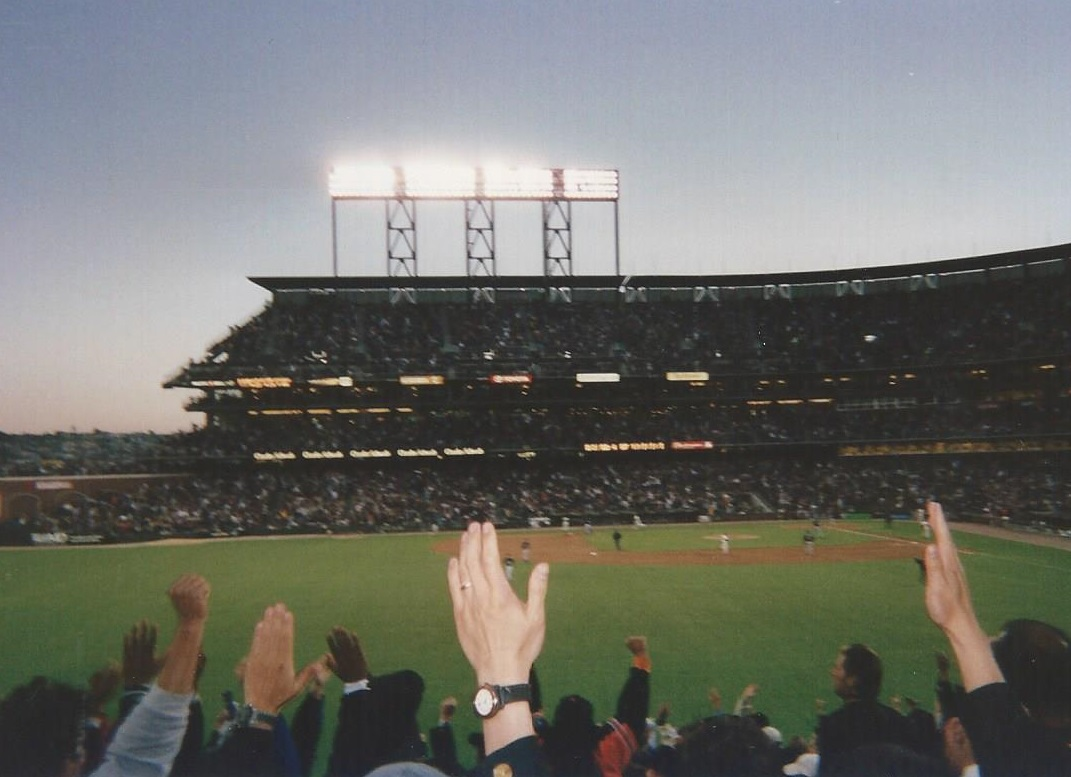
Barry Bonds hits number 525 in the 2001 San Diego Padres Season

The 2001 San Diego Padres season was the 33rd season in franchise history.

== Offseason ==
- November 3, 2000: Buddy Carlyle was purchased by Hanshin Tigers (Japan Central) from the San Diego Padres.
- December 10, 2000: Ernie Young was signed as a free agent with the San Diego Padres.
- December 15, 2000: Adam Riggs was signed as a free agent with the San Diego Padres.
- January 12, 2001: Heathcliff Slocumb was released by the San Diego Padres.
- March 19, 2001: Rickey Henderson signed as a free agent with the San Diego Padres.
- March 28, 2001: Mark Kotsay was traded by the Florida Marlins with Cesar Crespo to the San Diego Padres for Matt Clement, Eric Owens, and Omar Ortíz (minors).

== Regular season ==
=== Rickey Henderson ===
- During the 2001 season, Rickey Henderson broke two major league records and reached a career milestone. He broke Babe Ruth's all-time record for walks, Ty Cobb's all-time record for runs (doing so with a home run), and on the final day of the season, he had his 3,000th career hit. That final game was also Padre legend Tony Gwynn's last major league game, and is the only time in Major League history in which two teammates had 3,000 hits each. Rickey had originally wanted to sit that game out so as not to detract from the occasion, but Gwynn insisted that Henderson play.

At the age of 42, his last substantial major league season, Henderson finished the year with 25 stolen bases, ninth in the NL. It also marked Rickey Henderson's 23rd consecutive season in which he'd stolen more than 20 bases.

=== Opening Day starters ===
- Chris Gomez – SS
- Mark Kotsay – CF
- Mike Darr – LF
- Ryan Klesko – 1B
- Tony Gwynn – RF
- Damian Jackson – 2B
- Ben Davis – C
- Phil Nevin – 3B
- Kevin Jarvis – SP

=== Season standings ===
NL West
Team	W	L	Pct.	GB	Home	Road
Arizona Diamondbacks	92	70	.568	—	48‍–‍33	44‍–‍37
San Francisco Giants	90	72	.556	2	49‍–‍32	41‍–‍40
Los Angeles Dodgers	86	76	.531	6	44‍–‍37	42‍–‍39
San Diego Padres	79	83	.488	13	35‍–‍46	44‍–‍37
Colorado Rockies	73	89	.451	19	41‍–‍40	32‍–‍49

==== Record vs. opponents ====
2001 National League record Source: MLB Standings Grid – 2001
Team	AZ	ATL	CHC	CIN	COL	FLA	HOU	LAD	MIL	MON	NYM	PHI	PIT	SD	SF	STL	AL
Arizona	—	5–2	6–3	5–1	13–6	4–2	2–4	10–9	3–3	3–3	3–3	3–4	4–2	12–7	10–9	2–4	7–8
Atlanta	2–5	—	4–2	4–2	4–2	9–10	3–3	2–5	3–3	13–6	10–9	10–9	5–1	3–3	4–2	3–3	9–9
Chicago	3–6	2–4	—	13–4	3–3	3–3	8–9	4–2	8–9	3–3	4–2	4–2	10–6	2–4	3–3	9–8	9–6
Cincinnati	1–5	2–4	4–13	—	3–6	4–2	6–11	4–2	6–10	4–2	4–2	2–4	9–8	2–4	4–2	7–10	4–11
Colorado	6–13	2–4	3–3	6–3	—	4–2	2–4	8–11	5–1	3–4	4–3	2–4	2–4	9–10	9–10	6–3	2–10
Florida	2–4	10–9	3–3	2–4	2–4	—	3–3	2–5	4–2	12–7	7–12	5–14	4–2	3–4	2–4	3–3	12–6
Houston	4–2	3–3	9–8	11–6	4–2	3–3	—	2–4	12–5	6–0	3–3	3–3	9–8	3–6	3–3	9–7	9–6
Los Angeles	9–10	5–2	2–4	2–4	11–8	5–2	4–2	—	5–1	2–4	2–4	3–3	7–2	9–10	11–8	3–3	6–9
Milwaukee	3–3	3–3	9–8	10–6	1–5	2–4	5–12	1–5	—	4–2	3–3	3–3	6–11	1–5	5–4	7–10	5–10
Montreal	3–3	6–13	3–3	2–4	4–3	7–12	0–6	4–2	2–4	—	8–11	9–10	5–1	3–3	2–5	2–4	8–10
New York	3–3	9–10	2–4	2–4	3–4	12–7	3–3	4–2	3–3	11–8	—	11–8	4–2	1–5	3–4	1–5	10–8
Philadelphia	4–3	9–10	2–4	4–2	4–2	14–5	3–3	3–3	3–3	10–9	8–11	—	5–1	5–2	3–3	2–4	7–11
Pittsburgh	2–4	1–5	6–10	8–9	4–2	2–4	8–9	2–7	11–6	1–5	2–4	1–5	—	2–4	1–5	3–14	8–7
San Diego	7–12	3–3	4–2	4–2	10–9	4–3	6–3	10–9	5–1	3–3	5–1	2–5	4–2	—	5–14	1–5	6–9
San Francisco	9–10	2–4	3–3	2–4	10–9	4–2	3–3	8–11	4–5	5–2	4–3	3–3	5–1	14–5	—	4–2	10–5
St. Louis	4–2	3–3	8–9	10–7	3–6	3–3	7–9	3–3	10–7	4–2	5–1	4–2	14–3	5–1	2–4	—	8–7

=== Notable transactions ===
- July 30, 2001: Sterling Hitchcock was traded by the San Diego Padres to the New York Yankees for Brett Jodie and Darren Blakely (minors).

=== Roster ===
2001 San Diego Padres
Roster
Pitchers: 44 Tom Davey; 53 Adam Eaton; 57 Jeremy Fikac; 59 Junior Herndon; 41 Sterling Hitchcock; 51 Trevor Hoffman; 32 Kevin Jarvis; 58 Brett Jodie; 28 Bobby Jones; 50 Brian Lawrence; 36 David Lee; 46 Carlton Loewer; 49 David Lundquist; 54 Dave Maurer; 43 Chuck McElroy; 54 Jason Middlebrook; 29 Rodney Myers; 37 José Núñez; 40 Jimmy Osting; 47 Rudy Seánez; 39 Wascar Serrano; 55 Brian Tollberg; 56 Kevin Walker; 18 Woody Williams; 34 Jay Witasick	Catchers: 13 Ben Davis; 7 Wiki González; 20 Rick Wilkins; Infielders: 9 Alex Arias; 8 César Crespo; 10 Chris Gomez; 2 Damian Jackson; 4 D'Angelo Jiménez; 30 Ryan Klesko; 12 Dave Magadan; 17 Donaldo Méndez; 23 Phil Nevin; 16 Adam Riggs; 18 Kevin Witt	Outfielders: 10 Emil Brown; 21 Mike Colangelo; 26 Mike Darr; 19 Tony Gwynn; 24 Rickey Henderson; 14 Mark Kotsay; 16 Ray Lankford; 1 Santiago Pérez; 27 Bubba Trammell	Manager: 15 Bruce Bochy; Coaches: 38 Greg Booker (bullpen); 52 Duane Espy (hitting); 11 Tim Flannery (third base); 5 Rob Picciolo (bench); 45 Dave Smith (pitching); 3 Alan Trammell (first base)

== Player stats ==
=== Batting ===
Note: Pos = Position; G = Games played; AB = At bats; H = Hits; Avg. = Batting average; HR = Home runs; RBI = Runs batted in

Pos	Player	G	AB	H	Avg.	HR	RBI
C	Ben Davis	138	448	107	.239	11	57
1B	Ryan Klesko	146	538	154	.286	30	113
2B	Damian Jackson	122	440	106	.241	4	38
SS	D'Angelo Jiménez	86	308	85	.276	3	33
3B	Phil Nevin	149	546	167	.306	41	126
LF	Rickey Henderson	123	379	86	.227	8	42
CF	Mark Kotsay	119	406	118	.291	10	58
RF	Bubba Trammell	142	490	128	.261	25	92

==== Other batters ====
Note: G = Games played; AB = At bats; H = Hits; Avg. = Batting average; HR = Home runs; RBI = Runs batted in

Player	G	AB	H	Avg.	HR	RBI
Mike Darr	105	289	80	.277	2	34
Wiki Gonzalez	64	160	44	.275	8	27
César Crespo	55	153	32	.209	4	12
Alex Arias	70	137	31	.226	2	12
Dave Magadan	91	128	32	.250	1	12
Ray Lankford	40	125	36	.288	4	19
Donaldo Méndez	46	118	18	.153	1	5
Chris Gomez	40	112	21	.188	0	7
Tony Gwynn	71	102	33	.324	1	17
Mike Colangelo	50	91	22	.242	2	8
Santiago Pérez	43	81	16	.198	0	4
Adam Riggs	12	36	7	.194	0	1
Kevin Witt	14	27	5	.185	2	5
Rick Wilkins	12	22	4	.182	1	8
Emil Brown	13	14	1	.071	0	0

=== Pitching ===
==== Starting pitchers ====
Note: G = Games pitched; IP = Innings pitched; W = Wins; L = Losses; ERA = Earned run average; SO = Strikeouts

Player	G	IP	W	L	ERA	SO
Bobby Jones	33	195.0	8	19	5.12	113
Kevin Jarvis	32	193.1	12	11	4.79	133
Woody Williams	23	145.0	8	8	4.97	102
Brian Tollberg	19	117.1	10	4	4.30	71
Adam Eaton	17	116.2	8	5	4.32	109
Sterling Hitchcock	3	19.0	2	1	3.32	15
Carlton Loewer	2	4.1	0	2	24.92	1

==== Other pitchers ====
Note: G = Games pitched; IP = Innings pitched; W = Wins; L = Losses; ERA = Earned run average; SO = Strikeouts

Player	G	IP	W	L	ERA	SO
Brian Lawrence	27	114.2	5	5	3.45	84
Wascar Serrano	20	46.2	3	3	6.56	39
Junior Herndon	12	42.2	2	6	6.33	14
Brett Jodie	7	23.1	0	1	4.63	13
Jason Middlebrook	4	19.1	2	1	5.12	10

===== Relief pitchers =====
Note: G = Games pitched; W = Wins; L = Losses; SV = Saves; ERA = Earned run average; SO = Strikeouts

Player	G	W	L	SV	ERA	SO
Trevor Hoffman	62	3	4	43	3.43	63
José Núñez	56	4	1	0	3.31	49
David Lee	41	1	0	0	3.70	42
Tom Davey	39	2	4	0	4.50	37
Rodney Myers	37	1	2	1	5.32	29
Jay Witasick	31	5	2	1	1.86	53
Chuck McElroy	31	1	1	0	5.16	25
Rudy Seánez	26	0	2	1	2.63	24
Jeremy Fikac	23	2	0	0	1.37	19
David Lundquist	17	0	1	0	5.95	19
Kevin Walker	16	0	0	0	3.00	17
Dave Maurer	3	0	0	0	10.80	4
Jimmy Osting	3	0	0	0	0.00	3

== Award winners ==
2001 Major League Baseball All-Star Game

- Ryan Klesko
- Phil Nevin

== Farm system ==
Level	Team	League	Manager
AAA	Portland Beavers	Pacific Coast League	Rick Sweet
AA	Mobile BayBears	Southern League	Tracy Woodson
A	Lake Elsinore Storm	California League	Craig Colbert
A	Fort Wayne Wizards	Midwest League	Tom Lawless
A-Short Season	Eugene Emeralds	Northwest League	Jeff Gardner
Rookie	Idaho Falls Padres	Pioneer League	Jake Molina

LEAGUE CO-CHAMPIONS: Lake Elsinore
