= Sal Fasano =

American baseball player & coach (born 1971)

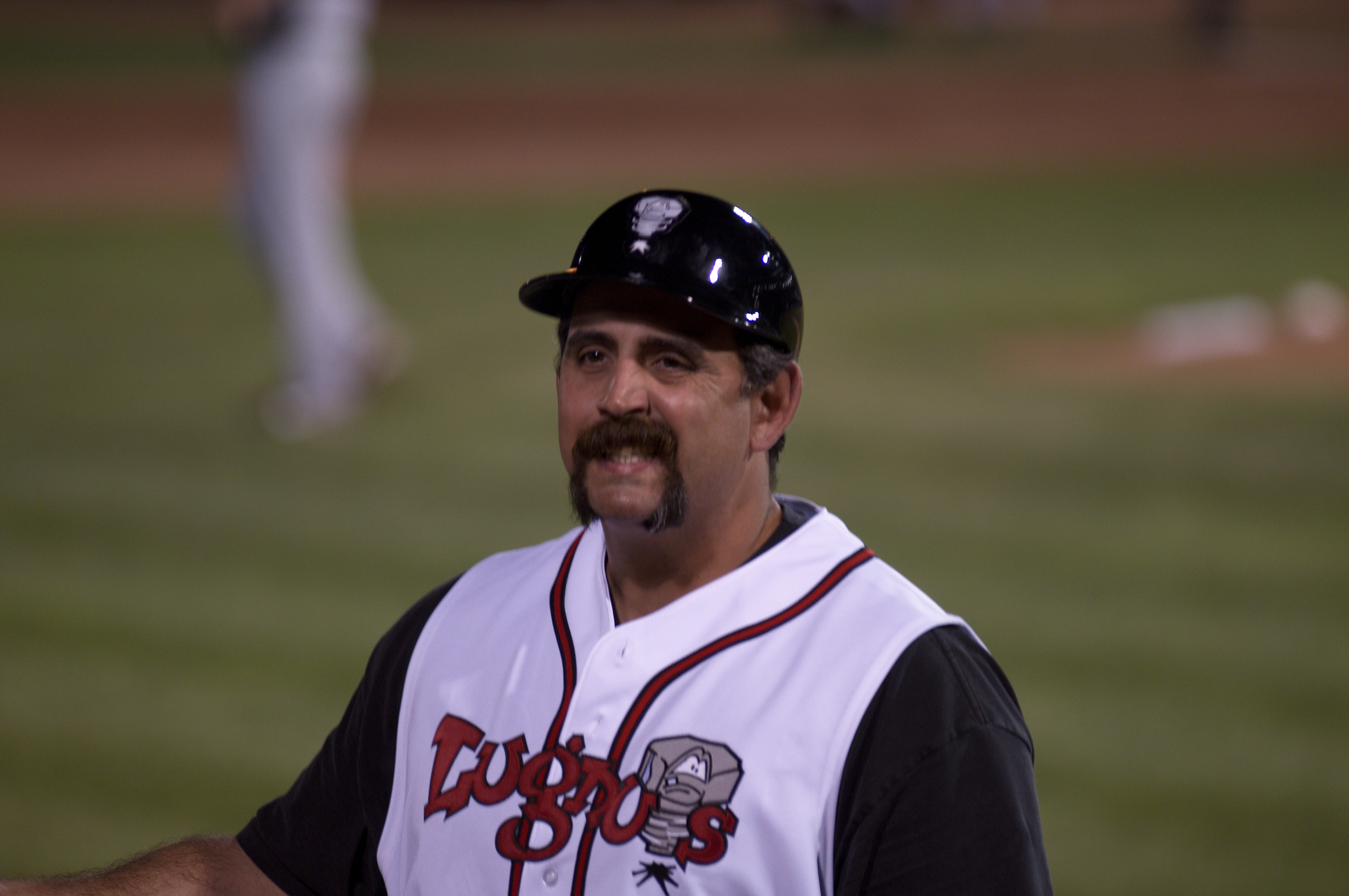
- Fasano as manager for the Lansing Lugnuts in 2010.
- Catcher / Coach
- Born: August 10, 1971 (age 55); Chicago, Illinois, U.S.
- Batted: Right Threw: Right

MLB debut
- April 3, 1996, for the Kansas City Royals

Last MLB appearance
- September 14, 2008, for the Cleveland Indians

MLB statistics
- Batting average: .221
- Home runs: 47
- Runs batted in: 140
- Stats at Baseball Reference

Teams
- As player: Kansas City Royals (1996–1999); Oakland Athletics (2000–2001); Kansas City Royals (2001); Colorado Rockies (2001); Anaheim Angels (2002); Baltimore Orioles (2005); Philadelphia Phillies (2006); New York Yankees (2006); Toronto Blue Jays (2007); Cleveland Indians (2008); As coach: Atlanta Braves (2018–2024); Los Angeles Angels (2025)

Career highlights and awards
- World Series champion (2021)

Salvatore Frank Fasano (/fəˈsɑːnoʊ/; born August 10, 1971) is an American former professional baseball catcher, who played for nine different Major League Baseball (MLB) teams over his 11–year big league career. Upon retiring as a player, he became a coach within the Toronto Blue Jays organization between 2010 and 2016. After coaching for a single season within the Los Angeles Angels minor league system, Fasano joined the major league coaching staff of the Atlanta Braves. He currently serves as the assistant pitching coach for the Angels.

Jeff Pearlman of ESPN.com said of Fasano: "When I think of Sal Fasano, however, I think of greatness. Not of Willie Mays or Ted Williams greatness, but of a uniquely excellent human being who, were class and decency the most valued standards of a career, would be the easiest Hall of Fame inductee of all time."

== Professional career ==
=== Kansas City Royals ===
After three seasons in the minor leagues, Fasano made his Major League debut on April 3, 1996, for the Royals. He finished the game 0-for-3 in a 7–1 loss to the Baltimore Orioles. He spent the next three seasons splitting catching duties with starter Mike Macfarlane and rising prospect Mike Sweeney. In 1998, he established career highs in at bats (216) and runs batted in (RBIs) (31). He also ranked second in the American League in HBPs with 16. In his first four seasons with the Royals, Fasano batted .219 with 20 home runs and 67 RBI.

=== Oakland Athletics ===
The Oakland Athletics acquired Fasano from the Royals in exchange for cash considerations on March 31, 2000. He was named the team's backup catcher behind starter Ramón Hernández. Fasano helped the A's capture the American League West division crown that season, and made his, to date, only post season appearance as a defensive replacement. While with Oakland, Fasano says, he came to realize that many players around him were taking anabolic steroids, and briefly considered following suit, but he decided against it. In 63 total games with the Athletics, Fasano hit .190 with seven home runs and 19 RBI.

=== Return to Kansas City ===
On May 22, 2001, the Royals purchased Fasano's contract from the Athletics. He appeared in only three games for the Royals during his second stint, and went hitless in his lone at-bat.

=== Colorado Rockies ===
On June 24, 2001, Fasano and Mac Suzuki were traded to the Colorado Rockies for Brent Mayne. In 25 games for the Rockies, Fasano hit .254 with three home runs and 9 RBI.

=== 2002–2005 ===
On January 11, 2002, Fasano signed a minor league contract with the Tampa Bay Devil Rays. and was released on June 1. On June 6, he signed with the Milwaukee Brewers organization. On July 31, Fasano and Alex Ochoa were traded to the Anaheim Angels for Jorge Fabregas and a player to be named later. Fasano played in only two games for the Angels, going 0-for-1 at the plate with a strikeout. On November 4, 2002, he was released by the Angels. He did not play baseball at any level in 2003, and on January 14, 2004, signed a minor league contract with the New York Yankees. Fasano appeared in 76 games for the Triple-A Columbus Clippers in 2004, and hit .229 with 10 home runs and 34 RBI.

Fasano was released by the Yankees organization on October 15, 2004. On December 16, he signed with the Baltimore Orioles. Fasano appeared in 64 games for them during the 2005 season, and arguably had the best season of his Major League career, hitting .250 with 11 home runs and 20 RBI. He became a free agent on October 15, 2005.

=== Philadelphia Phillies ===
On December 1, 2005, Fasano signed a one-year, $425,000 contract with the Philadelphia Phillies. Fasano began 2006 as a backup to Mike Lieberthal. His distinctive Fu Manchu mustache earned him the cult admiration of Phillies fans, who began a Phan Phavorites fan club called Sal's Pals. Fasano showed his gratitude by buying the group pizza. Fasano began to see more playing time as Lieberthal got injured, eventually taking over the starting role. However, when rookie backstop Chris Coste emerged in Lieberthal's absence, it left Fasano as the odd catcher out on the Phillies' roster. He was designated for assignment on July 22. In 50 games for the Phillies, Fasano hit .243 with four home runs and 10 RBI.

=== New York Yankees ===
On July 26, 2006, Fasano was acquired by the New York Yankees in exchange for minor league infielder Hector Made. One of Fasano's first acts as a Yankee was to trim his facial hair in accordance with the Yankees' personal appearance policy. He spent the late summer and September as a back-up to Jorge Posada and did not appear in the Yankees' four-game loss to the Detroit Tigers in the Division Series. On August 19, 2006, Fasano made his first career pinch-running appearance, taking the place of Posada during a 13–5 win over the Boston Red Sox at Fenway Park. During that game, Fasano nearly picked off Manny Ramirez after blocking the plate and denying the Red Sox another run. In 28 games for the Yankees, Fasano batted .143 with one home run and 5 RBI.

=== Toronto Blue Jays ===
Fasano agreed to a minor league contract with the Toronto Blue Jays on January 17, 2007, and was invited to Major League spring training. On April 26, the Blue Jays purchased Fasano's contract from Triple-A Syracuse of the International League in order to fill a void left by an injury to Gregg Zaun. During this time, he shared catching responsibilities with Jason Phillips. His first at bat as a Blue Jay came against the Texas Rangers on April 28. Following the return of Zaun, the Blue Jays designated Fasano for assignment on June 13. He returned to Syracuse on June 19.

On September 4, Fasano was recalled by the Blue Jays. He had a .178 average with a home run and 4 RBI in 16 games during his brief stint as a replacement for the injured Zaun. He finished the season as a member of the Blue Jays 40-man roster and the back-up to Zaun and Curtis Thigpen.

On December 14, 2007, Fasano re-signed with the Blue Jays on a minor league contract. On March 25, 2008, Fasano was released by the Blue Jays.

=== Atlanta Braves ===
On April 11, 2008, Fasano signed as a free agent with the Atlanta Braves and was assigned to their Triple-A affiliate, the Richmond Braves. In 26 games for Richmond, Fasano hit .193 with two home runs and 9 RBI.

=== Cleveland Indians ===
On June 19, 2008, Fasano was traded by the Braves to the Cleveland Indians for a player to be named later and assigned to the Major League team as a backup for Kelly Shoppach with Víctor Martínez on the disabled list. In 15 games for the Indians in 2008, Fasano batted .261 with 6 RBI.

=== Return to Colorado ===
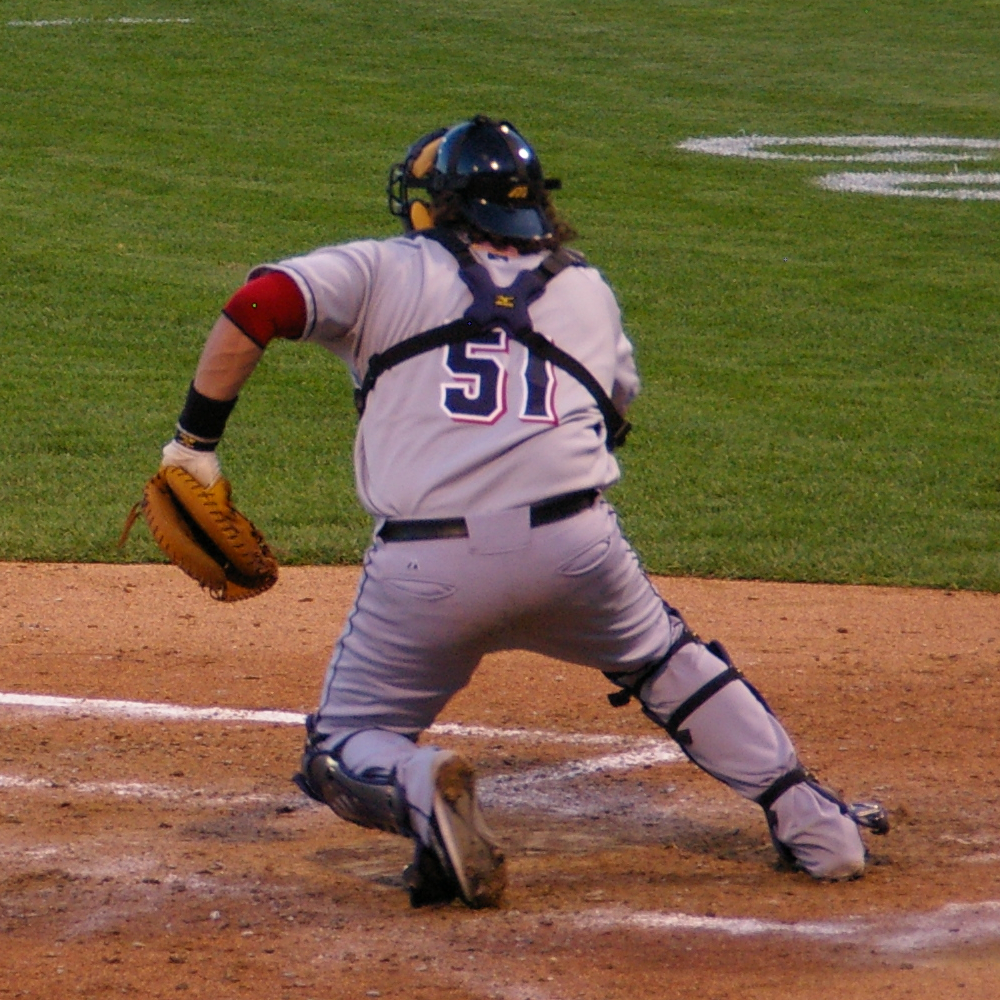
Fasano playing for the Colorado Springs Sky Sox in 2009

On February 10, 2009, Fasano signed a minor league deal to return to the Rockies. He was also extended an invitation to Major League spring training. Fasano played the entire 2009 season in Triple-A, batting .236 with four home runs and 21 RBI in 61 games for the Triple-A Colorado Springs Sky Sox, and retired at the end of the season.

== Coaching career ==
=== Toronto Blue Jays ===
On November 25, 2009, Fasano returned to the Toronto Blue Jays organization, accepting a managerial position with their Single–A affiliate, the Lansing Lugnuts, leading the 2010 team to a season record of 70–69 (.504).

On November 28, 2010, Fasano accepted the position as the manager of the New Hampshire Fisher Cats, Toronto's Double–A affiliate.

In 2011, Fasano was named Double–A Manager of the Year for leading the Fisher Cats to an Eastern League championship win. During the offseason, Fasano was given the position of Roving Catching Instructor in Player Development, and Gary Allenson was named manager of the Fisher Cats.

=== Los Angeles Angels ===
On January 20, 2017, the Los Angeles Angels hired Fasano to serve as the manager for their Double–A, the Mobile BayBears. The season ended with the BayBears holding a record of 64–75 (.460).

=== Atlanta Braves ===
On November 10, 2017, Fasano took a job as the catching instructor for the Atlanta Braves. On October 10, 2024, the Braves announced that Fasano would not return for the 2025 season, and that his position would not be filled.

=== Los Angeles Angels (second stint) ===
On November 11, 2024, Fasano was hired by the Los Angeles Angels to serve as the team's assistant pitching coach. He left the team following the 2025 season.

== Personal life ==
Fasano is the son of Vincent and Nella Fasano, Italian immigrants who settled in the Chicago area. He graduated from Hoffman Estates High School in Illinois, and played baseball collegiately at the University of Evansville, and is married to Kerri Kubinski, who was a volleyball player at Evansville. Fasano is a born-again Christian; he was introduced to spirituality by Kansas City teammate Keith Lockhart and credits religion with curtailing his desire to drink. Fasano and his wife have three children: Vincenzo, Angelo, and Santino. Santino was born with hypoplastic left heart syndrome and was successfully operated on.
