= Tim Christman =

American baseball player (born 1975)

- Relief pitcher
- Born: March 31, 1975 (age 51); Oneonta, New York, U.S.
- Batted: Left Threw: Left

MLB debut
- April 21, 2001, for the Colorado Rockies

Last MLB appearance
- April 21, 2001, for the Colorado Rockies

MLB statistics
- Wins: 0
- Earned run average: 4.50
- Strikeouts: 2
- Stats at Baseball Reference

Teams
- Colorado Rockies (2001)

Timothy Arthur Christman (born March 31, 1975) is an American former professional baseball left-handed pitcher. He played in Major League Baseball (MLB) in one game for the Colorado Rockies during the 2001 season.

== Amateur career ==
Christman attended Oneonta High School in Oneonta, New York and was named The Daily Star's player of the year in 1992 and 1993. Christman played college baseball at Siena College from 1994 to 1996. He set a school record for career strikeouts and strikeouts per nine innings. In 1994, Christman was named the Metro Atlantic Athletic Conference Rookie of the Year. On April 9, 1994, he threw a no-hitter against Niagara. In 2020, he was named to the conference's 40th Anniversary Baseball Team.

== Professional career ==
Christman was selected in the eleventh round of the 1996 Major League Baseball draft by the Colorado Rockies. He was assigned to the Portland Rockies of the Northwest League to begin his professional career. Christman missed the entire 1998 season due to elbow surgery. By 2000, he was on the team's 40-man roster. Christman missed all but eight games of the 2000 season due to a torn labrum. In spite of that, he was performing well enough in spring training in 2001 that Rockies manager Buddy Bell told The Denver Post that he had "a definite chance" to make the club. On April 19, 2001, he was promoted to the Major Leagues for the first time when pitcher Horacio Estrada was placed on the disabled list. He made his Major League debut on April 21 against the Arizona Diamondbacks at Bank One Ballpark. He pitched the final two innings of the game in relief of Joe Davenport, allowed a run on a solo home run to Reggie Sanders and struck out Rod Barajas. On April 22, he was demoted to Triple-A Colorado Springs. He would not appear in another game in the Major Leagues.

He spent the 2002 season in the Florida Marlins farm system. Following the 2002 season, he signed with the Chicago Cubs. By that point, he had had seven arm surgeries. Prior to the 2004 season, he signed with the Detroit Tigers. Christman began the 2004 season with the St. Paul Saints of the independent Northern League. He was one of several players to join the Tacoma Rainiers from an independent league in the middle of the 2004 season. The 2005 season would be his last in professional baseball; he pitched for the St. Paul Saints as well as the Somerset Patriots of the Atlantic League.

== International career ==
Christman played for the United States national baseball team at the 2003 Baseball World Cup in Cuba.

== Coaching career ==
Christman was hired as an assistant coach at the College of Saint Rose in 2009. He was later hired as an assistant coach for Albany. He has also worked as a baseball instructor at a sports facility in Clifton Park, New York.
