= Jay Powell (baseball) =

American baseball player (born 1972)

- Pitcher
- Born: January 9, 1972 (age 53); Meridian, Mississippi, U.S.
- Batted: Right Threw: Right

MLB debut
- September 10, 1995, for the Florida Marlins

Last MLB appearance
- July 29, 2005, for the Atlanta Braves

MLB statistics
- Win–loss record: 36–23
- Earned run average: 4.17
- Strikeouts: 423
- Stats at Baseball Reference

Teams
- Florida Marlins (1995–1998); Houston Astros (1998–2001); Colorado Rockies (2001); Texas Rangers (2002–2004); Atlanta Braves (2005)

Career highlights and awards
- World Series champion (1997)
Medals
Men's baseball
Representing United States
World Junior Baseball Championship
Bronze medal – third place	1990 Cuba	Team

James Willard "Jay" Powell (born January 9, 1972) is an American former baseball pitcher who last played for the Atlanta Braves.

He was drafted by the San Diego Padres in 1990 in the 11th round, but did not sign. Following his junior year at Mississippi State, he was drafted by the Baltimore Orioles in the first round (19th pick overall) in 1993 and signed. He played for the Florida Marlins, Houston Astros, Colorado Rockies, and Texas Rangers before signing with the Atlanta Braves in January 2005. His last game was on July 29, 2005, when he fractured his humerus.

Powell was the winning pitcher of Game 7 of the 1997 World Series for the Florida Marlins. He also has the most consecutive seasons pitched without a losing record among pitchers who primarily pitched in relief.
