= Scott Chiasson =

American baseball player (born 1977)

- Relief pitcher
- Born: August 14, 1977 (age 49); Norwich, Connecticut, U.S.
- Batted: Right Threw: Right

MLB debut
- September 19, 2001, for the Chicago Cubs

Last MLB appearance
- May 21, 2002, for the Chicago Cubs

MLB statistics
- Win–loss record: 1–1
- Earned run average: 11.12
- Strikeouts: 9
- Stats at Baseball Reference

Teams
- Chicago Cubs (2001–2002)

Scott Christopher Chiasson (born August 14, 1977) is an American former professional baseball pitcher. He played for the Chicago Cubs of Major League Baseball in 2001 and 2002. He graduated and was drafted out of Eastern Connecticut State University.

In 2007 he signed with the Yokohama BayStars of the Japanese Central League but did not appear in a game. He began 2008 with the Tigres de Quintana Roo of the Mexican League. On August 13, he signed with the Baltimore Orioles, who assigned him to the Norfolk Tides of the Triple-A International League.

On March 20, 2009, Chiasson was released by the Orioles.
