= Junior Herndon =

American baseball player (born 1978)

- Pitcher
- Born: September 11, 1978 (age 47); Liberal, Kansas, U.S.
- Batted: Right Threw: Right

MLB debut
- August 2, 2001, for the San Diego Padres

Last MLB appearance
- October 6, 2001, for the San Diego Padres

MLB statistics
- Win–loss record: 2–6
- Earned run average: 6.33
- Strikeouts: 14
- Stats at Baseball Reference

Teams
- San Diego Padres (2001)

Harry Francis "Junior" Herndon (born September 11, 1978) is an American former Major League Baseball player who pitched for the San Diego Padres during the 2001 season. In his career, he had a win-loss record of 2–6. He pitched 42.2 innings in 12 appearances while in the majors.
