= José Ortiz (second baseman) =

Dominican baseball player (born 1977)

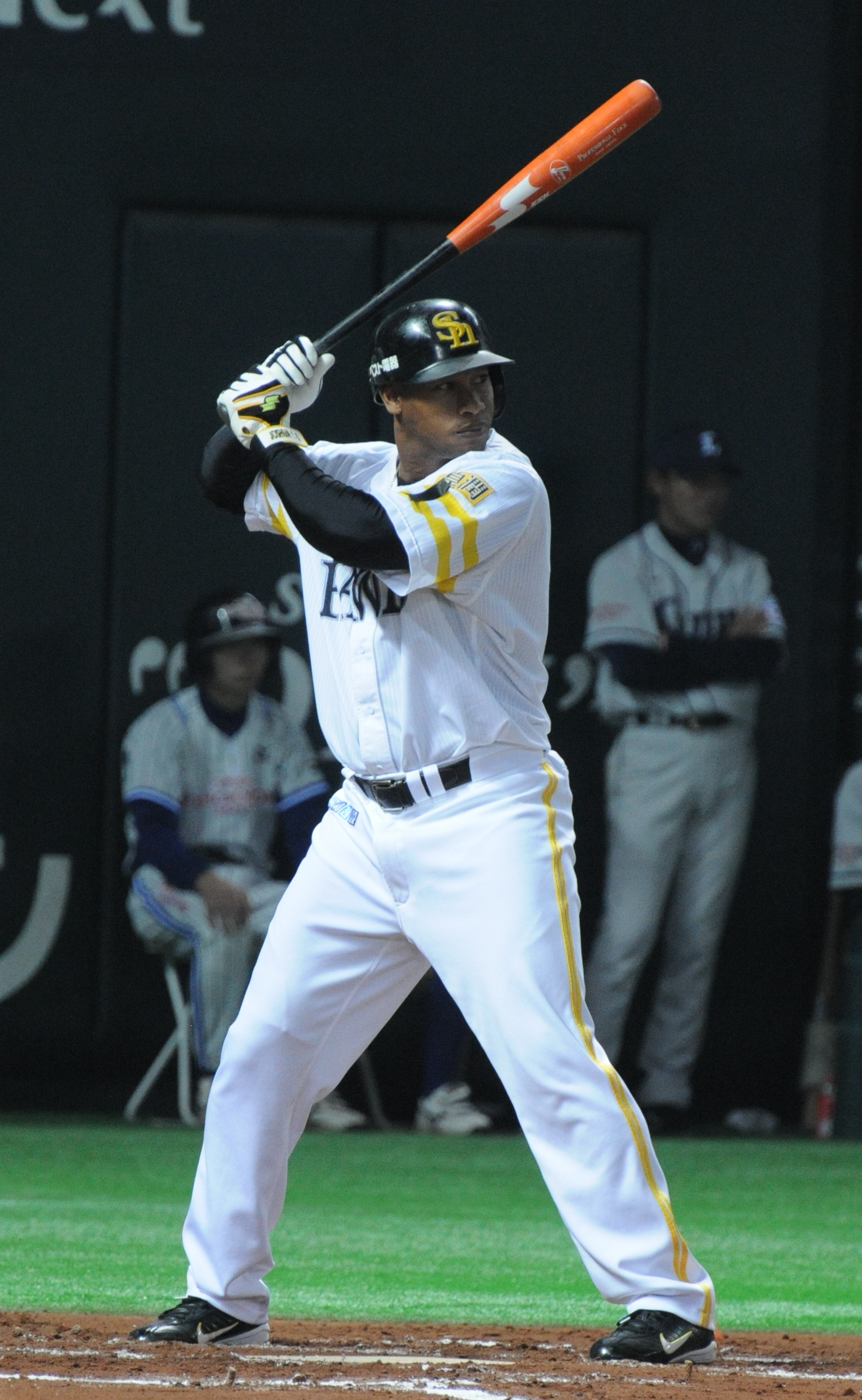
- Ortiz with the Fukuoka SoftBank Hawks
- Second baseman
- Born: June 13, 1977 (age 49); Santo Domingo, Dominican Republic
- Batted: Right Threw: Right

Professional debut
- MLB: September 15, 2000, for the Oakland Athletics
- NPB: March 28, 2003, for the Orix BlueWave

Last appearance
- MLB: September 27, 2002, for the Colorado Rockies
- NPB: May 28, 2013, for the Saitama Seibu Lions

MLB statistics
- Batting average: .243
- Home runs: 14
- Runs batted in: 51

NPB statistics
- Batting average: .271
- Home runs: 135
- Runs batted in: 433
- Stats at Baseball Reference

Teams
- Oakland Athletics (2000–2001); Colorado Rockies (2001–2002); Orix BlueWave (2003–2004); Chiba Lotte Marines (2007–2008); Fukuoka SoftBank Hawks (2009–2011); Saitama Seibu Lions (2012–2013)

Career highlights and awards
- Japan Series champion (2011)

José Daniel Ortiz Santos (born June 13, 1977) is a Dominican former professional baseball player. He played in Major League Baseball (MLB) for the Oakland Athletics and Colorado Rockies and in Nippon Professional Baseball (NPB) for the Orix Buffaloes, Chiba Lotte Marines, Fukuoka SoftBank Hawks, and Saitama Seibu Lions.

== Playing career ==
=== Early career and MLB debut ===
Ortiz was originally signed by the Oakland Athletics as an amateur free agent in 1994. After spending several seasons in the minors, he had a breakout season in 2000, winning the Pacific Coast League Most Valuable Player Award while playing for the A's Triple-A farm club, the Sacramento River Cats. That earned him a September call-up to the majors, where he played in seven games for Oakland.

=== 2001: Becoming a major league regular ===
Before the 2001 season, Baseball America ranked him the best prospect in Oakland's farm system and the 34th-best prospect in baseball.

Ortiz started the year in Oakland, but was returned to the minor leagues two weeks later after batting .179 in his first 11 games. After a second brief call-up in May Ortiz was traded to the Colorado Rockies on July 25 as part of a package that brought Jermaine Dye to Oakland. Ortiz was installed as the Rockies starting second baseman, replacing Todd Walker (who had been traded to the Cincinnati Reds). Ortiz batted .255 the rest of the way, with 13 home runs in just 204 at bats in 53 games.

=== 2002: Sophomore slump? ===
Ortiz opened the 2002 season as the Rockies' starter at second again, but his power numbers declined substantially. By mid-June, while he was hitting .244, Ortiz had just one home run through the same number of games (53) in which he'd hit 13 home runs the year before. Ortiz was sent down to the Triple-A Colorado Springs Sky Sox and was replaced at second by Brent Butler. After hitting .333 with 6 home runs in 26 minor league games, Ortiz was brought back up in September. He hit .281 in 12 games down the stretch, but failed to hit a home run the rest of the year.

=== Off to Japan ===
Ortiz was not offered a contract by the Rockies after the season, and rather than catch on with another major league club, Ortiz signed with the Orix BlueWave of the Japanese Pacific League. On March 28, 2003, Ortiz hit a home run in his first at bat in Japan, and on May 3 he hit for the cycle against the Seibu Lions. He finished 2003 with 33 home runs for the BlueWave, batting .255 and driving in 86 runs in 127 games.

Ortiz returned to the BlueWave for 2004, and he increased his batting average to .289. However, his power totals declined, as he dropped to 24 home runs in 128 games. After the season, the BlueWave merged with the Kintetsu Buffaloes to become the Orix Buffaloes, and Ortiz was not retained for 2005 by the new team.

=== Independent ball and back to Japan ===
Without a team in Japan or the majors, Ortiz signed with the Lancaster Barnstormers of the Atlantic League of Professional Baseball. He played two seasons with Lancaster in 2005 and 2006. In 2007, Ortiz returned to Japan with the Chiba Lotte Marines, where he batted .309 with 7 home runs in 67 games. He returned to the Marines in 2008, batting .288 with 11 home runs in 100 games. His contract was not renewed by the Marines, and so he started the season as a free agent. In May, the Fukuoka SoftBank Hawks came calling, needing a power bat in the lineup to protect aging left-handed slugger Nobuhiko Matsunaka.

== Coaching career ==
On February 6, 2026, Ortiz was announced as a hitting coach for the Stockton Ports, the Single-A affiliate of the Athletics.
