= Cliff Brumbaugh =

American baseball player (born 1974)

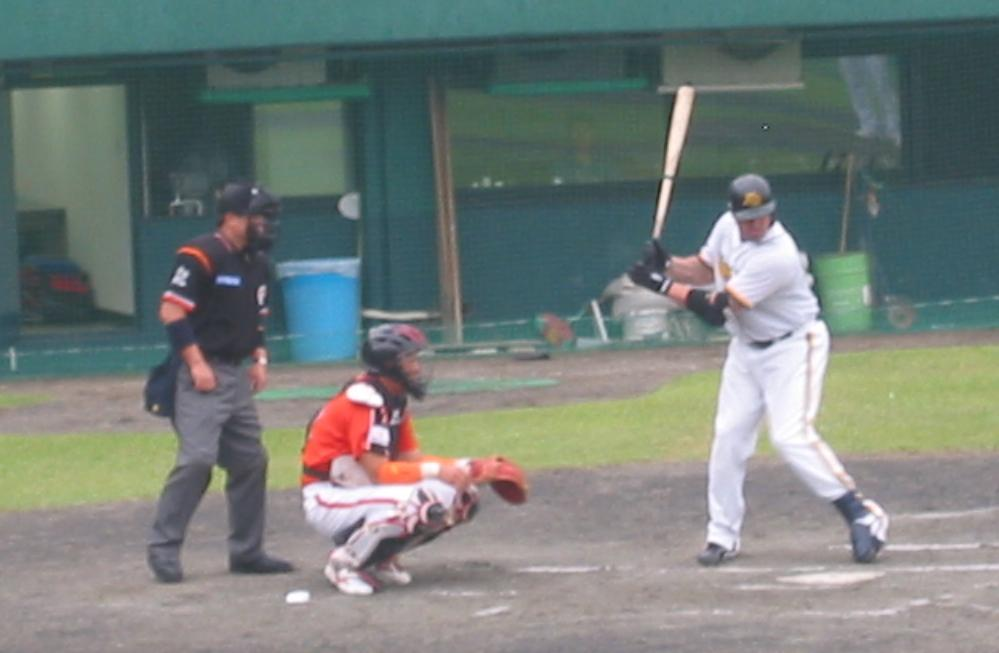
- Brumbaugh at bat for the Hyundai Unicorns, 2007
- Outfielder
- Born: April 21, 1974 (age 52); Wilmington, Delaware, U.S.
- Batted: Right Threw: Right

Professional debut
- MLB: May 30, 2001, for the Texas Rangers
- KBO: June 24, 2003, for the Hyundai Unicorns
- NPB: March 26, 2005, for the Orix Buffaloes

Last appearance
- MLB: July 24, 2001, for the Colorado Rockies
- NPB: July 12, 2006, for the Orix Buffaloes
- KBO: September 22, 2009, for the Kiwoom Heroes

MLB statistics
- Batting average: .217
- Home runs: 1
- Runs batted in: 4

KBO statistics
- Batting average: .299
- Home runs: 116
- Runs batted in: 390

NPB statistics
- Batting average: .255
- Home runs: 24
- Runs batted in: 69
- Stats at Baseball Reference

Teams
- Texas Rangers (2001); Colorado Rockies (2001); Hyundai Unicorns (2003–2004); Orix Buffaloes (2005–2006); Hyundai Unicorns (2007); Woori Heroes (2008–2009)

Career highlights and awards
- KBO: 2× Korean Series champion (2003, 2004); Golden Glove Award (2004); KBO batting champion (2004)

Clifford Michael Brumbaugh (born April 21, 1974) is an American former professional baseball player. From Wilmington, Delaware, he played college baseball for the Delaware Fightin' Blue Hens where he was a two-time All-American and the North Atlantic Conference (NAC) Player of the Year. Drafted by the Texas Rangers of Major League Baseball (MLB) in 1995, he played in the minor leagues until being called up to the majors in 2001.

After playing seven games for the Rangers, Brumbaugh was waived and claimed by the Colorado Rockies, playing 14 games with the Rockies that season. After spending 2002 and part of 2003 in the minor leagues, he requested a release and joined the Hyundai Unicorns of the KBO League mid-season. He became a top player for the Unicorns and helped them win consecutive Korean Series titles, while Brumbaugh won the Golden Glove Award and was league batting champion in 2004.

Brumbaugh played for the Orix Buffaloes in Nippon Professional Baseball (NPB) from 2005 to 2006 before returning to the Unicorns in 2007. After they disbanded, he played in the KBO League for the Woori Heroes from 2008 to 2009, then returned to North America and played in the Mexican League and Golden Baseball League in 2010 to conclude his career.

== Early life ==
Clifford Michael Brumbaugh was born on April 21, 1974, in Wilmington, Delaware. He attended William Penn High School in Wilmington, where he was a top baseball player. In his junior year at William Penn, he had a batting average of .451 and recorded 22 runs batted in (RBIs). He then went on a training program the following offseason and further improved, ending his senior year as the statewide leader in several categories. He helped William Penn win the state Flight A championship and ranked first in the state with a batting average of .509 and 31 RBIs, having eight more RBIs than the next-highest player. He also placed second in runs scored (27) – two behind the leader – and was second in doubles (10) – one behind the leader. He was named William Penn's most valuable player and was chosen first-team all-state, the only third baseman selected. He was the Delaware Player of the Year and also the Delaware American Legion Player of the Year, for his play with the Stahl American Legion team.

== College career ==
Despite his accomplishments in high school, Brumbaugh was not selected in the 1992 Major League Baseball draft. He was offered a contract of $1,200 to join the Milwaukee Brewers, but declined it to play college baseball for the Delaware Fightin' Blue Hens of the University of Delaware, later declaring it to be the "[b]est move I ever made." In his first year at Delaware, 1993, Brumbaugh started in 47 of 49 games and helped the team to a record of 28–21, batting .291 while having 41 hits and an on-base percentage of .423. The following year, he batted .417 and was the leading hitter in the North Atlantic Conference (NAC), posting 56 RBIs and six home runs. He was chosen a third-team All-American by the American Baseball Coaches Association (ABCA) and also was a first-team choice on the All-Region and All-NAC squads. He helped the team compile an overall record of 41–14 while winning the NAC title and also was a key player in their win of the Liberty Bell Classic, being named the MVP of the tournament.

As a junior, Brumbaugh batted .442, the seventh-best mark nationally. He batted in 56 runs and had 32 doubles, the highest total in the country. He also had 95 hits, which was the second-most in Delaware history, his 32 doubles set the program record, and he also tied a team record that year with three home runs in a game. He was chosen the NAC Player of the Year, having led the conference in the categories of hits, doubles, and runs, was first-team All-NAC, and was an ABCA second-team All-American choice. The 1995 season was Brumbaugh's last at Delaware, as he left to play professionally; he ended as "[o]ne of the all-time great sluggers in Delaware baseball history," according to the team website, having a .393 career batting average which was fourth all-time in school history while helping the team go 117–48 overall in his tenure.

In between his collegiate career, Brumbaugh played for several summer league teams. He was a member of Schweizer's in the Delaware Semi-Pro Baseball League in 1993 before playing for the Canada Dry team in that league in 1994. He also played in 1994 with the Walton Drillers of the National Amateur Baseball Federation (NABF) and with the Falmouth Commodores of the Cape Cod Baseball League (CCBL). With the Commodores, he started 24 games and helped the team go 25–11 with a playoff appearance, batting .271 with 21 hits and 11 RBIs.

== Professional career ==
=== 1995–1997: Single-A ===
In June 1995, Brumbaugh was selected in the 13th round of the 1995 Major League Baseball draft by the Texas Rangers. He was the first Fightin' Blue Hen to be selected in the draft since 1984 and was the 23rd overall. He signed with the Rangers and was sent to the Class A Short Season-level Hudson Valley Renegades of the New York–Penn League (NYPL). He immediately became a starter and one of the best in the league for the Renegades. The team's administrative assistant, Dennis Wansor, described Brumbaugh as "far and away the best hitter in the league, without a doubt." Playing third base, he started all 74 games for the team and helped them reach the playoffs as a wildcard with a 47–27 record. He batted .358 and had an on-base percentage of .437, while recording 101 hits, 45 RBIs, 19 doubles, four triples and two home runs, in addition to 15 bases stolen while only being caught stealing three times. He was named the league's most valuable player and a league all-star selection.

Brumbaugh was elevated to the Class A Charleston RiverDogs of the South Atlantic League in 1996. He struggled some early on in the season against more difficult competition but ultimately improved as the season progressed and was one of the team's top hitters. Mid-season, he was moved from third base to being a first baseman. He ended the season having appeared in 132 games and batted .242 while having 111 hits, 45 RBIs, 23 doubles, seven triples and six home runs.

In 1997, Brumbaugh played for the Class A-Advanced Port Charlotte Rangers of the Florida State League (FSL). He was asked by the Texas Rangers to become a power-hitter and "delivered" on their request, setting a then-personal best with 15 home runs on the season, tying for the Port Charlotte team record. He batted .261 while appearing in all 139 games for the Rangers (133 at first base, three at third base, two at second base, and one at shortstop), also posting 136 hits, 70 RBIs and four triples.

=== 1998–2000: Double-A and Triple-A ===
After spring training in 1998, Brumbaugh initially was sent back to the Class A level to play with the Rangers again; however, after an injury to Rob Sasser, he was promoted to the Double-A Tulsa Drillers of the Texas League. He joined the team two weeks into the Texas League season and immediately became a starter, seeing time as both an infielder and an outfielder as the season progressed. He appeared in 132 games for the team, which included 97 at first base, 23 at third base and 12 as an outfielder. Brumbaugh led the team with 76 RBIs and batted .259, also having 125 hits, 34 doubles and 15 home runs. He helped the team reach the league playoffs, where he played 10 games at first base and batted .306 with six RBIs, three doubles and a home run as they won the championship over the Wichita Wranglers in seven games.

Brumbaugh returned to the Drillers in 1999. He improved over the second half of the season as he had promised to fans, having the majority of his home runs and RBIs during that time. He was named the Drillers Player of the Month for June that year while totaling 25 RBIs with a batting average of .272, and in July both played with the Texas Rangers at the Hall of Fame Game and played at the Texas League All-Star Game. He helped them reach the playoffs, and in the middle of the first round, he was called up to the Triple-A Oklahoma City RedHawks of the Pacific Coast League (PCL), for whom he played with seven days. He returned to the Drillers in time for their appearance in the league championship, which they lost. With Tulsa, he ended the year with 139 games played and batted .281, while being the team leader in both home runs (25) and RBIs (89). He also had 144 hits, 35 doubles, three triples and 18 stolen bases with the team. In his brief stay with the RedHawks, Brumbaugh batted .250 in four games and had three hits with an RBI.

Brumbaugh began the 2000 season with the Triple-A RedHawks before being sent back down to the Double-A Drillers early in the year. He later returned to the RedHawks and had a hitting streak that lasted 12 games, two shy of the team record. With the Drillers, he appeared in seven games and batted .222 with six hits, a double, two home runs and three RBIs. He played in 127 games for the RedHawks and had a batting average of .278, recording 126 hits, 56 RBIs, 28 doubles and 10 home runs.

=== 2001: Major League Baseball ===
Brumbaugh began the 2001 season with Oklahoma City of the PCL. After playing 51 games, in which he batted .305 and had 38 RBIs along with eight home runs, he was called up by the Rangers to the major leagues for the first time on May 28. He was a starter in the outfield with the Rangers and made his MLB debut on May 30 against the Kansas City Royals. He was at-bat twice and struck out both times in the Rangers' 11–2 loss to the Royals. After seven games, in which he went 0-for-10 at-bat, Brumbaugh was put on waivers and sent back to the minor leagues. Soon after, he was claimed by the Colorado Rockies. He spent two weeks with the team's Triple-A minor league affiliate, the Colorado Springs Sky Sox of the PCL, before being called back up to the majors. On July 1, he had his first career hit, a home run against the Arizona Diamondbacks. Brumbaugh appeared in 14 games with the Rockies before returning to the minor leagues, in which he batted .278 with 10 hits, two doubles, a home run, and four RBIs. With the Sky Sox, he played in 53 games and batted .332 with 69 hits, 39 RBIs, 18 doubles and three home runs. He ended the season with 107 games in the PCL, having a batting average of .320 with 131 hits, 29 doubles, 11 home runs and 81 RBIs, while in what would be his only season in the major leagues, he had 21 games played with a batting average of .217, 10 hits, four RBIs, two doubles and one home run.

=== 2002–2003: Later minor league career ===
Brumbaugh played Triple-A baseball for the 2002 season. He ultimately played 136 games for the Sky Sox that year and had a batting average of .293 while totaling 148 hits, 81 RBIs, 36 doubles and 18 home runs. The following year, Brumbuagh was signed by the Chicago White Sox and played with their Triple-A minor league affiliate, the Charlotte Knights of the International League (IL). He appeared in 62 games and batted .309 while having 69 hits, 30 RBIs, 13 doubles and nine home runs.

=== 2003–2010: International career ===
After being dismayed at not being promoted to the major leagues despite good performances, Brumbaugh requested a release from the White Sox to play in the KBO League, the top league in South Korea, due to them having better-paying contracts (Brumbaugh's minor league contract was $10,000 per month, while he signed a contract worth $125,000 over three months in the KBO League). After joining the Hyundai Unicorns mid-season, he appeared in 70 games and became one of the top players in the league, batting .303 with 51 RBIs and 14 home runs. He also had 80 hits, 18 doubles, and 45 runs in 264 appearances at-bat. He was considered a key player in helping the team have the number one seed entering the playoffs; the Unicorns defeated SK Wyverns in seven games in the Korean Series to become league champions, with Brumbaugh having a record 10 RBIs and a .350 batting average in the Series. He lost out in voting for MVP to teammate Chung Min-tae.

After his performance in the 2003 season, Brumbaugh's contract was renewed in 2004. He had his best season in 2004, which included becoming the league batting champion with a .343 average. He appeared in 132 games and led Hyundai to a repeat Korean Series championship; his batting average set a long-standing record among all foreign players, while he had 163 hits, 25 doubles, 33 home runs and 105 RBIs. The Dong-a Ilbo noted that "[h]is name was placed at the top of all categories", with Brumbaugh also having the best slugging percentage in the league (.608) as well as the best on-base percentage (.468), while being second in home runs and second in RBIs. He was named the recipient of the KBO League Golden Glove Award for his performance, a rarity for non-Koreans in the league, as Brumbaugh was only the fifth-ever foreigner to receive the honor.

Although the team attempted to keep him, Brumbaugh announced he was leaving for the Orix Buffaloes of Nippon Professional Baseball (NPB), the top league in Japan, following the 2004 season. He appeared in 124 games for the Buffaloes in the 2005 season, batting .263 with 118 hits, 20 doubles, 19 home runs and 57 RBIs. Limited by injury, his play declined in 2006, with him playing just 47 games and batting .223 with 27 hits, five home runs and 12 RBIs; he was released by the team before the year ended.

Brumbaugh returned to the Unicorns in 2007. He appeared in 126 games and batted .308, totaling 135 hits, 13 doubles, 29 home runs and 87 RBIs. The Unicorns were disbanded in 2008 and Brumbaugh moved to the Woori Heroes. However, his play declined in two seasons with the Heroes, due to a nagging Achilles tendon injury. He played 102 games and batted .293 in 2008, posting 105 hits, 17 doubles, 13 home runs and 61 RBIs. He then played 123 games in 2009 but his batting average dipped to .245, with him having 107 hits, 21 doubles, 27 home runs and 86 RBIs. He left South Korea following the 2009 season.

Brumbaugh began the 2010 season in Mexico, playing for the Piratas de Campeche of the Mexican League (LML). He batted .260 and hit four home runs with 14 RBIs in 20 games. He also had a two-game stint in the league with the Acereros de Monclova, making eight plate appearances but not registering a hit. Afterwards, Brumbaugh signed to play in Canada with the Edmonton Capitals of the independent Golden Baseball League (GBL). Despite being 36 years old, over nine years older than the league average, he was one of the top players in the GBL and was named an all-star and the league MVP at the end of the season. With Edmonton, he batted .383, finished as the league leader with 23 home runs and totaled 90 RBIs, second in the league. He retired after the season.

Brumbaugh ended his 16-year, five-country professional baseball career having a combined .289 batting average, .478 slugging percentage and .858 OPS. He received five all-star honors in the minor leagues and four all-star honors playing in international leagues.

== Later life ==
Brumbaugh is married and has three children. He began operating a baseball camp in Oklahoma following his playing career.

Brumbaugh was inducted into the University of Delaware Athletic Hall of Fame in 2018. In 2022, he placed 31st on The News Journal's list of the 100 greatest male athletes in University of Delaware history. Brumbaugh was selected for induction into the Delaware Sports Museum and Hall of Fame in 2024, although his induction was later postponed.
