= Courtney Duncan =

American baseball player (born 1974)

- Pitcher
- Born: October 9, 1974 (age 51); Mobile, Alabama, U.S.
- Batted: Left Threw: Right

MLB debut
- April 2, 2001, for the Chicago Cubs

Last MLB appearance
- June 1, 2002, for the Chicago Cubs

MLB statistics
- Win–loss record: 3–3
- Earned run average: 4.80
- Strikeouts: 50
- Stats at Baseball Reference

Teams
- Chicago Cubs (2001–2002)

Courtney Duncan (born October 9, 1974), is an American former professional baseball player. He played in Major League Baseball as a pitcher for the Chicago Cubs from 2001–2002.

== Amateur career ==
Duncan graduated from Daphne High School in Alabama in 1993. After initially committing to play college baseball at a junior college in Alabama, Duncan was recruited to Grambling State University by fellow Alabamian and Grambling State Tigers baseball coach Sap Randall. Duncan was at first unimpressed by the school's baseball facilities but switched his commitment after being offered an academic scholarship. In 1995, as a sophomore, he was named to the All-Southwestern Athletic Conference Baseball First Team.

== Professional career ==
Duncan was selected by the Chicago Cubs in the 20th round of the 1996 Major League Baseball draft and made his professional debut at Bowman Field with the Williamsport Cubs of the New York–Penn League on June 26.

During the 2000 season, the Cubs converted Duncan to relief pitching. Although Duncan said it "took a little bit of getting used to pitching on back-to-back days," he finished the year with the second-most saves in the Southern League.

Duncan made the final cuts for the Cubs' Major League roster during spring training in 2001 but he was not guaranteed to make the Opening Day roster after the Cubs traded for pitcher Manny Aybar in late March. Duncan was named to the roster for Opening Day, however, after an injury to Tom Gordon; manager Don Baylor waited until after April Fools' Day to inform Duncan. He made his Major League debut on Opening Day, April 2, 2001, at Wrigley Field. He entered in relief of Félix Heredia and threw a nine-pitch walk to Orlando Cabrera of the Montreal Expos. On May 1, he was demoted to Triple-A after Gordon returned from injury. However, a day later, Cubs president Andy MacPhail called him to tell him he was being recalled to the Cubs because pitcher Mike Fyhrie had suffered a broken arm. On May 5, he drew a bases loaded walk against José Núñez and later scored on an error by Dave Hansen; these would be the only run and run batted in of his Major League career. Duncan was placed on the disabled list on June 29 after injuring his back while fielding a bunt. He was activated from the disabled list on July 16 and replaced an injured Rondell White on Chicago's roster. Duncan was placed on the disabled list again on July 26 after being diagnosed with tendinitis in his shoulder. Duncan returned from the disabled list on September 1 and allowed ten earned runs in his final seven innings pitched of the season.

Heading into the 2002 season, the Chicago Tribune reported that the Cubs were "content with their returning relievers" including Duncan and that he was favored to make the Major League bullpen out of spring training. In spite of that, he was unable to match his 2001 velocity during spring training and began the season in Triple-A Iowa. Duncan was not promoted to the majors again until May 25 following an injury to pitcher Ron Mahay. He would appear in only two games in the majors before being optioned back to Triple-A on June 4 upon Kyle Farnsworth's return from injury. His appearance on June 1, 2002, would prove to be the final of his Major League career. Following the season, the Cubs declined to offer him a contract and he became a free agent.

Duncan began the 2003 season pitching out of the bullpen in the San Diego Padres' farm system but, by August, he had been supplanted by Brandon Villafuerte and the Padres traded him to the Anaheim Angels. He pitched twice in relief in Triple-A Salt Lake to close out the season.

Duncan signed with the Chicago White Sox prior to the 2004 season and was assigned to the Triple-A Charlotte Knights to start the season. Duncan spent the bulk of the year in Triple-A but also made four appearances in Double-A Birmingham. He was placed on the disabled list on August 9. It would be his final season in affiliated baseball.

Duncan appeared in a single game for the Jackson Senators of the independent Central Baseball League in 2005. He faced just two batters, walking one and hitting the other with a pitch. It would his final game in professional baseball. The Senators released him on May 28, 2005.
