= Mac Suzuki =

Japanese baseball player (born 1975)

Mac Suzuki マック鈴木
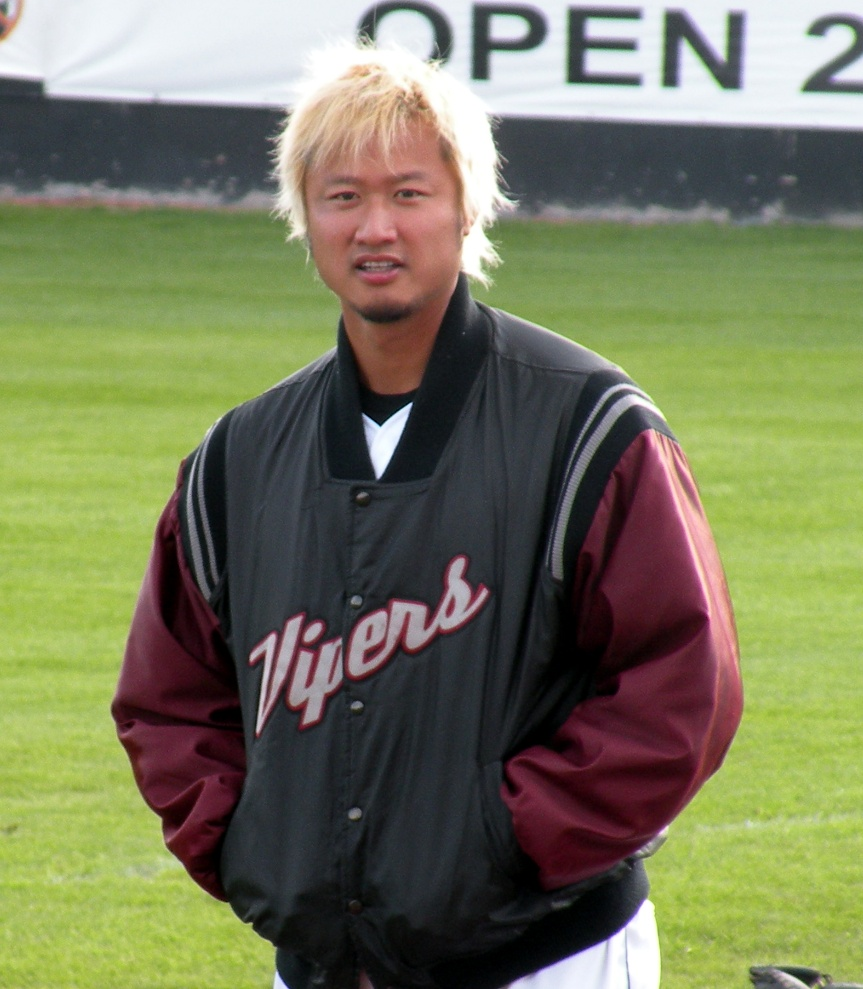
- Pitcher
- Born: May 31, 1975 (age 50); Kobe, Japan
- Batted: Right Threw: Right

Professional debut
- MLB: July 7, 1996, for the Seattle Mariners
- NPB: 2003, for the Orix BlueWave

Last appearance
- MLB: June 26, 2002, for the Kansas City Royals
- NPB: 2005, for the Orix Buffaloes

MLB statistics
- Win–loss record: 16–31
- Earned run average: 5.72
- Strikeouts: 327

NPB statistics
- Win–loss record: 5–15
- Earned run average: 7.82
- Strikeouts: 130
- Stats at Baseball Reference

Teams
- Seattle Mariners (1996, 1998–1999); Kansas City Royals (1999–2001); Colorado Rockies (2001); Milwaukee Brewers (2001); Kansas City Royals (2002); Orix BlueWave / Buffaloes (2003–2005); La New Bears (2007–2008)

Mac Suzuki (マック鈴木; born Makoto Suzuki (鈴木 誠, Suzuki Makoto); May 31, 1975) is a Japanese former professional baseball pitcher. Over his career, Suzuki played 18 seasons in professional baseball, including six in Major League Baseball and two in the Japan Pacific League. In his major league career, he has played for the Seattle Mariners (1996, 1998–1999), the Kansas City Royals (1999–2001, 2002), the Colorado Rockies (2001), and the Milwaukee Brewers (2001). With those teams, he has had a combined record of 16–31 with a 5.72 earned run average (ERA), one complete game, one shutout, 67 starts and 327 strikeouts in 117 games pitched.

== Early life ==
At the age of 16, Suzuki was sent away from his home by his parents after getting expelled from high school. He then got a job with the Salinas Spurs, an unaffiliated club in the California League based in Salinas, California. With the Spurs, Suzuki pitched the final game of the season in 1992, after he spent the entire season as their laundry boy. The next season, Suzuki became a full-time player for the San Bernardino Spirit. Suzuki later stated that his parents were proud of him for learning the English language and how much he matured after he was sent away.

== Professional career ==
=== Seattle Mariners ===
Suzuki pitched for the non-affiliated Class-A San Bernardino Spirits in 1993, going 4–4 with a 3.68 earned run average (ERA), 12 saves, and 87 strikeouts in 48 games, one start. He led the Spirit in saves that season. Suzuki signed with the Seattle Mariners in 1993, choosing Seattle over a list of suitors including the Toronto Blue Jays. In his first season in affiliated professional baseball in 1994, Suzuki pitched for the Double-A Jacksonville Suns of the Southern League. In eight games, he went 1–0 with a 2.84 ERA, one save, and 10 strikeouts. Suzuki was sidelined that season due to a shoulder injury. After an earthquake hit his home town on Kobe, Japan, Suzuki returned to care for his family during the off-season before the 1995 season. During spring training in 1995, Suzuki was again plagued by shoulder injuries. He split the season between the rookie-league AZL Mariners and the Class-A Advanced Riverside Pilots. In ten combined games in the minors, Suzuki went 1–1 with a 5.40 ERA, and nine strikeouts. Suzuki was promoted to the majors in 1995, however, he did not play. He made his major league debut on July 7, 1996, becoming the third Japanese player to play in the major leagues, after Masanori Murakami and Hideo Nomo, and the first Japanese player to pitch in the American League. He was sent back to the minors shortly afterwards, but marked his first major league win in 1998.

=== Later career ===
He was sent briefly to the New York Mets in June, 1999, before being shipped away again to the Kansas City Royals. He won 8 games in 2000, including one shutout victory. The following season, Suzuki was traded to the Colorado Rockies, then claimed by the Milwaukee Brewers, before returning to the Royals again. He did not win a game in 2002, and was released by the Royals. He announced his decision to enter the Japanese professional leagues at the end of the season.

According to regulations, Suzuki still needed to be picked in the draft to join a Japanese team. The Yakult Swallows had originally intended to choose him, but the Orix BlueWave forcefully picked Suzuki in the 2nd round, and he ended up joining the Blue Wave. There was debate about whether Suzuki qualified for the Japanese rookie of the year award, since he had already played in the major leagues. The league granted him the qualification, but Suzuki rejected it, perhaps due to his pride as a former major leaguer. In the end, the debate proved meaningless, as Suzuki won only 4 games that year, and in August, 2003, he could not get a single out in a game against the Fukuoka Daiei Hawks, where his team lost 1-29. He pitched horrendously against the Hawks in 2003, giving up 32 runs in only 6 games. In 2004, he started only 5 games (none of which were against the Hawks), all of which he failed to get past the 5th inning. His only win that year came against the Osaka Kintetsu Buffaloes, where he won despite giving up 5 runs over 5 innings. He did not pitch at all in 2005, and was cut from the team during the off-season.

Suzuki returned to the United States, and signed a minor league contract with the Oakland Athletics in December, 2005. He pitched poorly in spring training, and did not make the major league team. He joined Olmecas de Tabasco of the Mexican League in 2006, and signed a minor league deal with the Chicago Cubs in the 2006 off-season. In 2009, he played for the Southern Maryland Blue Crabs of the independent Atlantic Professional Baseball League.

In 2010, he signed with the Calgary Vipers of the Golden Baseball League. In 2011 Suzuki was announced as an instructor for the California Winter League (CWL) located in Palm Springs, Ca.

He is currently involved with Japanese Independent baseball and was also a player in the CWL in the 2010 season.
