= Brent Butler =

American baseball player (born 1978)

- Infielder
- Born: February 11, 1978 (age 47); Laurinburg, North Carolina, U.S.
- Batted: Right Threw: Right

MLB debut
- July 4, 2001, for the Colorado Rockies

Last MLB appearance
- June 19, 2003, for the Colorado Rockies

MLB statistics
- Batting average: .248
- Home runs: 11
- Runs batted in: 60
- Stats at Baseball Reference

Teams
- Colorado Rockies (2001–2003)

Justin Brent Butler (born February 11, 1978) is a retired Major League Baseball utility infielder.

Butler attended Scotland High School in Laurinburg, North Carolina, graduating in 1996. He was drafted by the St. Louis Cardinals in the 3rd round of the 1996 MLB amateur draft, and made his Major League Baseball debut with the Colorado Rockies on July 4, 2001. Butler appeared in his final game on June 19, 2003.

During his first season at the Major League level, Butler compiled a .244 batting average in limited playing time. The Rockies manager at the time, Buddy Bell, used Butler primarily off of the bench as Todd Walker served as the Rockies starting second baseman. After Walker's departure from the team at the end of the 2001 season, Butler saw his greatest amount of playing time. During the 2002 season, Butler served as the Rockies starting second baseman. However, after compiling only a .259 batting average with a .287 OBP, the Rockies signed Ronnie Belliard as their starting second baseman for the 2003 season, relegating Butler to a reserve role again.

Once the 2003 season concluded, the Rockies released Butler. Although Butler continued competing at the minor league level for the St. Louis Cardinals, Atlanta Braves, and Tampa Bay Rays, he never returned to the major leagues after his Rockies release.
