= Brian Tollberg =

American baseball player (born 1972)

- Pitcher
- Born: September 16, 1972 (age 53); Tampa, Florida, U.S.
- Batted: Right Threw: Right

MLB debut
- June 20, 2000, for the San Diego Padres

Last MLB appearance
- June 10, 2003, for the San Diego Padres

MLB statistics
- Win–loss record: 15–16
- Earned run average: 4.48
- Strikeouts: 182
- Stats at Baseball Reference

Teams
- San Diego Padres (2000–2003)

Brian Patrick Tollberg (born September 16, 1972) is a former starting pitcher in Major League Baseball who played from 2000 through 2003 for the San Diego Padres. Listed at 6' 3", 195 lb., Tollberg batted and threw right handed, He was born in Tampa, Florida.

Tollberg began his professional career in 1994 with the Chillicothe Paints of the independent Frontier League before signing as a free agent with the Milwaukee Brewers a year later. He then was traded by Milwaukee to San Diego in 1997, and made it to the majors in June 2000 with the Padres.

Tollberg has the distinction of being the first ballplayer to make it to the Major Leagues from the Frontier League. As a result, the league's version of the Cy Young Award is named after him.

Tollberg posted a 4–5 record with a 3.58 ERA in his rookie season with the Padres. In addition, he earned National League Player of the Week honors during his first week in the Major Leagues, after going 2–0 with a 1.26 ERA in 14 1/3 innings pitched. The following season, he won 10 games with a 4.30 ERA before being injured. He played two more seasons for the club.

In between, Tollberg pitched in the Colorado Rockies and Houston Astros organizations at Triple-A level, and finished his career with the Somerset Patriots of the independent Atlantic League in 2008.

Tollberg still active in youth baseball and also has served as Director of Player Development for Palma Ceia Little League in Tampa, Florida.
