= Mario Encarnación =

Dominican baseball player (1975–2005)

- Outfielder
- Born: September 24, 1975; Baní, Dominican Republic
- Died: October 3, 2005 (aged 30); Tamsui, Taiwan
- Batted: Right Threw: Right

Professional debut
- MLB: August 26, 2001, for the Colorado Rockies
- CPBL: April 16, 2005, for the Macoto Cobras

Last appearance
- MLB: April 14, 2002, for the Chicago Cubs
- CPBL: September 30, 2005, for the Macoto Cobras

MLB statistics
- Batting average: .203
- Home runs: 0
- Hits: 14

KBO statistics
- Batting average: .283
- Home runs: 13
- Runs batted in: 46

CPBL statistics
- Batting average: .307
- Home runs: 17
- Runs batted in: 45
- Stats at Baseball Reference

Teams
- Colorado Rockies (2001); Chicago Cubs (2002); Lotte Giants (2003–2004); Macoto Cobras (2005)

Career highlights and awards
- CPBL All-Star (2005)

Mario González Encarnación (September 24, 1975 – October 3, 2005) was a Dominican baseball outfielder. He played for the Colorado Rockies and Chicago Cubs for a brief duration—23 games in 2001 and 2002.

== Early life ==
Encarnación grew up in Baní where he was friends with Miguel Tejada. Encarnación dropped out of school at 15 years old to focus on baseball. In 1994, he signed a contract with the Oakland Athletics at the purported age of 16. Before traveling to the United States to play in Oakland's farm system, Encarnación borrowed and read psychology textbooks so that he could learn "how to talk to gringos". He also bought his mother her first telephone.

== Professional career ==
=== Minor League Baseball ===
Encarnación was assigned to the West Michigan Whitecaps of the Midwest League to begin his professional career in 1996. In 1999, he won the Triple-A World Series with the Vancouver Canadians. By that December, he was described in the Los Angeles Times as Oakland's "best position-player prospect." He was so highly regarded by the Athletics that they declined a trade for All-Star outfielder Jim Edmonds in December 1999 reportedly because it would have required them to part with Encarnación. Prior to the 2000 season, Baseball America ranked him the 90th-best prospect in baseball and the best position player prospect in the Oakland system. Shortly before the trade deadline in 2001, the Athletics traded Encarnación to the Colorado Rockies in a three-team deal that netted them Jermaine Dye from the Kansas City Royals.

=== Major League Baseball ===
On August 26, 2001, the Rockies added Encarnación to their Major League roster for the first time following an injury to outfielder Mark Little. He made his debut that afternoon against the Milwaukee Brewers at Miller Park. Though hitless in his debut, he walked in his first plate appearance against Rubén Quevedo and later walked and stole a base against Chad Fox and Henry Blanco. He would be a regular in Colorado's outfield for the remainder of the season alongside Juan Pierre and future Baseball Hall of Famer Larry Walker.

Encarnación entered spring training with the Rockies in 2002. During camp, amidst increased scrutiny from the Immigration and Naturalization Service following the September 11 attacks, it was discovered that Encarnación was actually two years older than he had represented. His listed age increased from 24 to 26 years old.

On April 4, 2002, the Chicago Cubs claimed Encarnación off waivers from the Rockies and designated Julio Zuleta for assignment. The following day, they added him to their active roster when outfielder Moisés Alou was placed on the disabled list. He would appear in only three games for the Cubs before, on April 15, Alou returned from the disabled list and Encarnación was designated for assignment. He would not return to the Major Leagues again in his career. He spent the remainder of the season in Triple-A with the Iowa Cubs.

In January 2003, Encarnación signed with the Montreal Expos. In May 2003, the St. Louis Cardinals traded a player to be named later to the Montreal Expos for Encarnación and assigned him to the Triple-A Memphis Redbirds. They released him later that month.

=== KBO League ===
Encarnación finished the 2003 season with the Lotte Giants of the KBO League, beginning a career in Asian professional baseball. He was paired in the outfield with Venezuelan player Robert Perez under KBO rules which only allowed two foreign players per team to play at any one time. Although the Giants would win 39 games and lose 91, he would lead them in both home runs and runs batted in. Encarnación returned to the Giants in 2004, albeit for only four games.

=== Chinese Professional Baseball League ===
Encarnación traveled to Taiwan to play for the Macoto Cobras of the Chinese Professional Baseball League (CPBL) in the 2005 season. He was a CPBL All-Star and helped lead the team to a first half title.

== Death ==
On October 3, he was found dead in his team dormitory room by a team employee after he missed a practice. There were no signs of forced entry in his room. He was survived by his wife, Rosana, and son, Mario. He was the first former Major League Baseball player to have died in Taiwan.

Earlier in the season, he was briefly suspended for testing positive for steroids, leading to speculation regarding the role of drugs in his death. It had also been reported that he had been suffering from a bout of gastroenteritis and had asked to be excused from that weekend's practices. Autopsy reports later showed that he had died from a congenital medical condition. According to his father, however, the doctors at the Universidad Autónoma de Santo Domingo who conducted the autopsy variously told him that the body was too decomposed to determine a cause of death and that he had died of a heart attack. Speculation abounded in the Dominican Republic that his death may have been related to a match-fixing operation, something for which the Chinese Professional Baseball League was known. His family called on the Dominican government to conduct an inquiry into his death but, according to his father, "they didn't do anything."

Encarnacion's body was transported back to the Dominican Republic from Taiwan by his team, while Miguel Tejada paid for his headstone at a cemetery in Baní.

=== Legacy ===
In 2006, the Sacramento River Cats and Sacramento Bee writer Marcos Breton established the Mario Encarnacion Humanitarian Award which is given annually to "athletes who inspire others through their story, lead by example, and are role models to others."

== See also ==
- List of baseball players who died during their careers
