= Horacio Estrada =

Venezuelan baseball player (born 1975)

- Pitcher
- Born: October 19, 1975 (age 50); San Joaquín, Carabobo, Venezuela
- Batted: Left Threw: Left

Professional debut
- MLB: May 4, 1999, for the Milwaukee Brewers
- KBO: April 6, 2003, for the Hanwha Eagles
- CPBL: March 18, 2007, for the La New Bears

Last appearance
- MLB: July 21, 2001, for the Colorado Rockies
- KBO: May 9, 2003, for the Hanwha Eagles
- CPBL: April 7, 2007, for the La New Bears

MLB statistics
- Win–loss record: 4–1
- Earned run average: 7.50
- Strikeouts: 22

KBO statistics
- Win–loss record: 1–3
- Earned run average: 4.71
- Strikeouts: 26

CPBL statistics
- Win–loss record: 1–1
- Earned run average: 3.52
- Strikeouts: 14
- Stats at Baseball Reference

Teams
- Milwaukee Brewers (1999–2000); Colorado Rockies (2001); Hanwha Eagles (2003); La New Bears (2007)

Horacio Estrada Jiménez (born October 19, 1975) is a Venezuelan former professional baseball relief pitcher. He played in Major League Baseball (MLB) for the Milwaukee Brewers and Colorado Rockies, in the KBO League for the Hanwha Eagles, and in the Chinese Professional Baseball League (CPBL) for the La New Bears.

Listed at 6' 1", Weight: 185 lb., Estrada batted and threw left handed. He was born in San Joaquín, Carabobo.

== Career ==
Estrada played from 1999 through 2001 for the Milwaukee Brewers and Colorado Rockies (2001). In a three-season career, he compiled a 4–1 record with 22 strikeouts and a 7.50 ERA in 36 innings of work.

He has also pitched with four different teams of the Venezuelan Professional Baseball League, most prominently for the Tigres de Aragua club.

On January 17, 2004, he broke his hip when the team bus he was on crashed with a van. He returned in the 2006–2007 season, posting a 5–1 record and a 1.96 ERA, while allowing 7.27 hits per nine innings pitched. He was then named Pitcher of the Year in the Venezuelan league, receiving Carrao Bracho Trophy honors.

== See also ==
- List of Major League Baseball players from Venezuela
