= Todd Belitz =

American baseball player (born 1975)

- Pitcher
- Born: October 23, 1975 (age 51); Des Moines, Iowa, U.S.
- Batted: Left Threw: Left

MLB debut
- September 4, 2000, for the Oakland Athletics

Last MLB appearance
- October 6, 2001, for the Colorado Rockies

MLB statistics
- Win–loss record: 1–1
- Earned run average: 6.39
- Strikeouts: 8
- Stats at Baseball Reference

Teams
- Oakland Athletics (2000); Colorado Rockies (2001)

Todd Belitz (born October 23, 1975) is an American former Major League Baseball left-handed pitcher who played for the Oakland Athletics and Colorado Rockies.

A native of Des Moines, Iowa, Belitz attended Edison High School (Huntington Beach, California) in Huntington Beach, California. He is an alumnus of Washington State University, where he played college baseball for the Cougars from 1995–1997. In 1995, he played collegiate summer baseball with the Brewster Whitecaps of the Cape Cod Baseball League.

Drafted by the Tampa Bay Devil Rays in the 4th round of the 1997 Major League Baseball draft, Belitz would make his Major League Baseball debut with Oakland on September 4, 2000. His final game came on October 6, 2001.
