= 2001 Montreal Expos season =

2001 Montreal Expos
- League: National League
- Division: East
- Ballpark: Olympic Stadium
- City: Montreal
- Record: 68–94
- Divisional place: 5th
- Owners: Jeffrey Loria
- General managers: Jim Beattie, Larry Beinfest
- Managers: Felipe Alou, Jeff Torborg
- Television: RDS Network (Rodger Brulotte, Denis Casavant, Jean St-Onge); The Sports Network (Vic Rauter, Warren Sawkiw)
- Radio: CKGM (AM) (Terry Haig, Elliott Price) CKAC (AM) (Jacques Doucet, Marc Griffin, Claude Raymond)

The 2001 Montreal Expos season was the 33rd season in franchise history.

== Offseason ==
- December 21, 2000: Tim Raines signed as a free agent with the Montreal Expos.
- December 21, 2000: Curtis Pride was signed as a free agent with the Montreal Expos.

== Spring training ==
In 2001, the Expos held spring training at Roger Dean Stadium in Jupiter, Florida, a facility they shared with the St. Louis Cardinals. It was their fourth season there.

== Regular season ==
- April 6, 2001 – In an era where the only bright spot for Expos fans was Vladimir Guerrero, another bright spot emerges as hero Tim Raines returns to Montreal for one last hurrah. In Rock's first at-bat back at the Big O he drew a walk off Glendon Rusch. Throughout the whole at-bat every Expo fan at the stadium stood and clapped for Timmy...all 45,183 of them.
- In a season that ended with talks of contraction, Felipe Alou was released as the Expos manager. He was replaced by former Chicago White Sox manager Jeff Torborg. Future White Sox manager Ozzie Guillén was a coach for the Expos.

=== Opening Day lineup ===
Opening Day Starters
Name	Position
Peter Bergeron	Center fielder
José Vidro	Second baseman
Fernando Tatís	Third baseman
Vladimir Guerrero	Right fielder
Lee Stevens	First baseman
Milton Bradley	Left fielder
Orlando Cabrera	Shortstop
Michael Barrett	Catcher
Javier Vázquez	Starting pitcher

=== Season standings ===
==== National League East ====
NL East
Team	W	L	Pct.	GB	Home	Road
Atlanta Braves	88	74	.543	—	40‍–‍41	48‍–‍33
Philadelphia Phillies	86	76	.531	2	47‍–‍34	39‍–‍42
New York Mets	82	80	.506	6	44‍–‍37	38‍–‍43
Florida Marlins	76	86	.469	12	46‍–‍34	30‍–‍52
Montreal Expos	68	94	.420	20	34‍–‍47	34‍–‍47

==== Record vs. opponents ====
2001 National League record Source: MLB Standings Grid – 2001
Team	AZ	ATL	CHC	CIN	COL	FLA	HOU	LAD	MIL	MON	NYM	PHI	PIT	SD	SF	STL	AL
Arizona	—	5–2	6–3	5–1	13–6	4–2	2–4	10–9	3–3	3–3	3–3	3–4	4–2	12–7	10–9	2–4	7–8
Atlanta	2–5	—	4–2	4–2	4–2	9–10	3–3	2–5	3–3	13–6	10–9	10–9	5–1	3–3	4–2	3–3	9–9
Chicago	3–6	2–4	—	13–4	3–3	3–3	8–9	4–2	8–9	3–3	4–2	4–2	10–6	2–4	3–3	9–8	9–6
Cincinnati	1–5	2–4	4–13	—	3–6	4–2	6–11	4–2	6–10	4–2	4–2	2–4	9–8	2–4	4–2	7–10	4–11
Colorado	6–13	2–4	3–3	6–3	—	4–2	2–4	8–11	5–1	3–4	4–3	2–4	2–4	9–10	9–10	6–3	2–10
Florida	2–4	10–9	3–3	2–4	2–4	—	3–3	2–5	4–2	12–7	7–12	5–14	4–2	3–4	2–4	3–3	12–6
Houston	4–2	3–3	9–8	11–6	4–2	3–3	—	2–4	12–5	6–0	3–3	3–3	9–8	3–6	3–3	9–7	9–6
Los Angeles	9–10	5–2	2–4	2–4	11–8	5–2	4–2	—	5–1	2–4	2–4	3–3	7–2	9–10	11–8	3–3	6–9
Milwaukee	3–3	3–3	9–8	10–6	1–5	2–4	5–12	1–5	—	4–2	3–3	3–3	6–11	1–5	5–4	7–10	5–10
Montreal	3–3	6–13	3–3	2–4	4–3	7–12	0–6	4–2	2–4	—	8–11	9–10	5–1	3–3	2–5	2–4	8–10
New York	3–3	9–10	2–4	2–4	3–4	12–7	3–3	4–2	3–3	11–8	—	11–8	4–2	1–5	3–4	1–5	10–8
Philadelphia	4–3	9–10	2–4	4–2	4–2	14–5	3–3	3–3	3–3	10–9	8–11	—	5–1	5–2	3–3	2–4	7–11
Pittsburgh	2–4	1–5	6–10	8–9	4–2	2–4	8–9	2–7	11–6	1–5	2–4	1–5	—	2–4	1–5	3–14	8–7
San Diego	7–12	3–3	4–2	4–2	10–9	4–3	6–3	10–9	5–1	3–3	5–1	2–5	4–2	—	5–14	1–5	6–9
San Francisco	9–10	2–4	3–3	2–4	10–9	4–2	3–3	8–11	4–5	5–2	4–3	3–3	5–1	14–5	—	4–2	10–5
St. Louis	4–2	3–3	8–9	10–7	3–6	3–3	7–9	3–3	10–7	4–2	5–1	4–2	14–3	5–1	2–4	—	8–7

Expos vs. American League
Team	AL East				
Team	BAL	BOS	NYY	TB	TOR
**Montreal**	1–2	1–2	1–2	2–1	3–3

=== Transactions ===
- June 12, 2001: The Expos signed Rob Ducey as a free agent.
- July 31, 2001: The Expos traded Milton Bradley to the Cleveland Indians for Zach Day.
- July 31, 2001: The Expos traded Ugueth Urbina to the Boston Red Sox for Tomokazu Ohka and Rich Rundles (minors).

=== Roster ===
2001 Montreal Expos
**Roster**
**Pitchers**: 36 Tony Armas Jr.; 50 Matt Blank; 31 Darwin Cubillán; 48,58 Joey Eischen; 14 Hideki Irabu; 31 Mike Johnson; 43 Felipe Lira; 37,47 Graeme Lloyd; 56 Troy Mattes; 40 Guillermo Mota; 46 Bobby Muñoz; 24 Tomo Ohka; 45 Carl Pavano; 29 Chris Peters; 34 Britt Reames; 26 Bob Scanlan; 51 Scott Stewart; 20 Scott Strickland; 32 Anthony Telford; 35 Mike Thurman; 41 Ugueth Urbina; 23 Javier Vázquez; 55 Masato Yoshii	**Catchers**: 5 Michael Barrett; 15 Randy Knorr; 16 Sandy Martínez; 39 Brian Schneider; **Infielders**: 11 Geoff Blum; 18 Orlando Cabrera; 59 Henry Mateo; 4 Ryan Minor; 12 Mike Mordecai; 9 Lee Stevens; 21 Fernando Tatís; 22 Andy Tracy; 3 José Vidro	**Outfielders**: 33 Peter Bergeron; 24 Milton Bradley; 29 Rob Ducey; 27 Vladimir Guerrero; 16 Terry Jones; 28 Curtis Pride; 30 Tim Raines; 19 Fernando Seguignol; 25 Mark Smith; 48 Brad Wilkerson; **Other batters**: 2 Tomas de la Rosa	**Manager**: 17 Felipe Alou; 1 Jeff Torborg; **Coaches**: 38 Brad Arnsberg (Pitching); 67 Pierre Arsenault (Bullpen); 49 Jeff Cox (Third base); 13 Ozzie Guillén (First base); 7 Perry Hill (First base); 44 Rick Renick (Bench); 6 Pat Roessler (Hitting)

=== Game log ===
Legend
	Expos win
	Expos loss
	Postponement
**Bold**	Expos team member

2001 game log
April (11–14)

#	Date	Opponent	Score	Win	Loss	Save	Attendance	Record
1	April 2	@ Cubs	5–4 (10)	**Lloyd** (1–0)	Fyhrie (0–1)	**Urbina** (1)	38,466	1–0
2	April 4	@ Cubs	3–2	**Reames** (1–0)	Wood (0–1)	**Urbina** (2)	23,070	2–0
3	April 5	@ Cubs	1–2	Tapani (1–0)	**Armas** (0–1)	Fassero (1)	16,758	2–1
4	April 6	Mets	10–6	**Thurman** (1–0)	Rose (0–1)	—	45,183	3–1
5	April 7	Mets	10-0	**Vázquez** (1–0)	Trachsel (0–1)	—	15,317	4–1
6	April 8	Mets	5–2	**Peters** (1–0)	Leiter (0–1)	**Urbina** (3)	11,321	5–1
7	April 9	Cubs	7–5	**Lloyd** (2–0)	Aybar (0–1)	**Urbina** (4)	5,776	6–1
8	April 10	Cubs	2–4	Tapani (2–0)	**Armas** (0–2)	Fassero (3)	8,314	6–2
9	April 11	Cubs	2–4	Tavárez (2–0)	**Thurman** (1-1)	Fassero (4)	9,632	6–3
10	April 13	Marlins	3–9	Dempster (2–0)	**Vázquez** (1-1)	—	12,554	6–4
11	April 14	Marlins	8–2	**Reames** (2–0)	Clement (1-1)	—	9,514	7–4
12	April 15	Marlins	3–6	Grilli (1-1)	**Armas** (0–3)	Alfonseca (1)	8,090	7–5
13	April 16	@ Mets	3–4	Reed (2–1)	**Thurman** (1–2)	Benítez (2)	18,241	7–6
14	April 17	@ Mets	0–4	Rusch (1–0)	**Peters** (1-1)	—	20,177	7–7
15	April 18	@ Mets	7–1	**Vázquez** (2–1)	Trachsel (0–3)	—	20,721	8–7
16	April 19	@ Marlins	2–5	Looper (1-1)	**Strickland** (0–1)	Alfonseca (3)	10,940	8–8
17	April 20	@ Marlins	1–5	Grilli (2–1)	**Armas** (0–4)	—	11,551	8–9
18	April 21	@ Marlins	0–5	Penny (1–0)	**Thurman** (1–3)	—	17,587	8–10
19	April 22	@ Marlins	6–2	**Peters** (2–1)	Núñez (1–2)	—	10,609	9–10
20	April 24	@ Cardinals	2–7	Kile (3–2)	**Vázquez** (2–2)	—	28,345	9–11
21	April 25	@ Cardinals	2–5	Benes (1-1)	**Reames** (2–1)	Stechschulte (1)	28,858	9–12
22	April 26	@ Cardinals	4–3 (15)	**Yoshii** (1–0)	James (1-1)	—	42,373	10–12
23	April 27	@ Brewers	6–1	**Thurman** (2–3)	Leiter (0–1)	—	26,350	11–12
24	April 28	@ Brewers	4–8	Sheets (1–2)	**Peters** (2–2)	—	40,877	11–13
25	April 29	@ Brewers	0–10	Wright (3–2)	**Vázquez** (2–3)	—	32,700	11–14

May (10–19)

#	Date	Opponent	Score	Win	Loss	Save	Attendance	Record
26	May 1	Diamondbacks	3–8	Schilling (4–0)	**Reames** (2–2)	—	4,340	11–15
27	May 2	Diamondbacks	4–3	**Armas** (1–4)	Anderson (0–3)	**Lloyd** (1)	4,352	12–15
28	May 3	Diamondbacks	1–2	Kim (2–1)	**Lloyd** (2–1)	Prinz (2)	4,788	12–16
29	May 4	Astros	4–8	Miller (5–1)	**Vázquez** (2–4)	—	6,017	12–17
30	May 5	Astros	3–4	Reynolds (2–2)	**Reames** (2–3)	Wagner (6)	20,541	12–18
31	May 6	Astros	7–13	Elarton (4–3)	**Telford** (0–1)	—	6,041	12–19
32	May 7	@ Giants	2–6	Ortiz (5–1)	**Armas** (1–5)	—	38,249	12–20
33	May 8	@ Giants	1–9	Estes (3–2)	**Thurman** (2–4)	—	38,123	12–21
34	May 9	@ Giants	8–0	**Vázquez** (3–4)	Hernández (2–5)	—	38,074	13–21
35	May 10	@ Giants	0–13	Rueter (4–3)	**Reames** (2–4)	—	41,059	13–22
36	May 11	@ Rockies	4–13	Neale (3–1)	**Peters** (2–3)	—	43,680	13–23
37	May 12	@ Rockies	8–4	**Armas** (2–5)	Thomson (0–1)	—	43,730	14–23
38	May 13	@ Rockies	14–10	**Lloyd** (3–1)	Astacio (4–3)	—	42,235	15–23
39	May 15	Dodgers	2–0	**Vázquez** (4–4)	Park (4–4)	—	4,714	16–23
40	May 16	Dodgers	2–7	Dreifort (3–2)	**Reames** (2–5)	—	4,759	16–24
41	May 17	Dodgers	3–1	**Armas** (3–5)	Gagné (1–3)	**Urbina** (5)	12,926	17–24
42	May 18	Padres	3–1	**Thurman** (3–4)	Jarvis (2–4)	**Urbina** (6)	6,851	18–24
43	May 19	Padres	7–20	Serrano (1-1)	**Yoshii** (1-1)	—	7,297	18–25
44	May 20	Padres	3–5	Jones (2–5)	**Vázquez** (4–5)	Hoffman (7)	7,269	18–26
45	May 21	Mets	3–6	Rusch (3–3)	**Reames** (2–6)	Benítez (6)	5,449	18–27
46	May 22	Mets	3–0	**Armas** (4–5)	Gonzalez (1–2)	**Urbina** (7)	4,186	19–27
47	May 23	Mets	2–4	Leiter (2–3)	**Peters** (2–4)	Benítez (6)	5,292	19–28
48	May 25	@ Phillies	8–10	Oropesa (1–0)	**Urbina** (1-1)	—	12,538	19–29
—	May 26	@ Phillies	Postponed (rain): Rescheduled for May 27 as part of a doubleheader.					
49	May 27 (1)	@ Phillies	5–7	Brock (2–0)	**Reames** (2–7)	Mesa (14)	22,451	19–30
50	May 27 (2)	@ Phillies	7–3	**Armas** (5-5)	Byrd (0–1)		22,451	20–30
51	May 28	@ Braves	3–5 (8)	Smoltz (1–2)	**Yoshii** (1–2)	Rocker (13)	24,904	20–31
52	May 29	@ Braves	4–7	Pérez (3–4)	**Blank** (0–1)	Rocker (14)	26,818	20–32
53	May 30	@ Braves	4–3	**Vázquez** (5–5)	Maddux (4–5)	**Urbina** (8)	27,936	21–32
54	May 31	Phillies	2–5	Cormier (3–0)	**Strickland** (0–2)	Mesa (16)	5,042	21–33

June (12–15)

#	Date	Opponent	Score	Win	Loss	Save	Attendance	Record
55	June 1	Phillies	2–13	Chen (2–3)	**Reames** (2–8)	—	5,267	21–34
56	June 2	Phillies	12–5	**Armas** (6–5)	Wolf (4–5)	—	7,810	22–34
57	June 3	Phillies	10–3	**Yoshii** (2–2)	Daal (6–1)	—	6,504	23–34
58	June 5	Braves	1–3	Maddux (5–5)	**Vázquez** (5–6)	Rocker (15)	7,017	23–35
59	June 6	Braves	0–2	Burkett (5–4)	**Irabu** (0–1)	Rocker (16)	5,102	23–36
60	June 7	Braves	3–4 (11)	Marquis (1–0)	**Strickland** (5–7)	Ligtenberg (1)	4,575	23–37
61	June 8	@ Orioles	0–5	Towers (3–1)	**Blank** (0–2)	—	39,940	23–38
62	June 9	@ Orioles	4–2	**Lloyd** (4–1)	Ryan (2–2)	**Urbina** (9)	39,521	24–38
63	June 10	@ Orioles	2–3	Johnson (6–3)	**Vázquez** (5–7)	Groom (2)	36,868	24–39
64	June 12	@ Yankees	2–1 (12)	**Strickland** (1–3)	Mendoza (2–1)	—	30,034	25–39
65	June 13	@ Yankees	3–9	Clemens (8–1)	**Irabu** (0–2)	—	24,960	25–40
66	June 14	@ Yankees	6–9	Keisler (1–1)	**Yoshii** (2–3)	Rivera (19)	33,306	25–41
67	June 15	Blue Jays	3–9	Carpenter (1–0)	**Vázquez** (5–8)	—	8,692	25–42
68	June 16	Blue Jays	7–2	**Blank** (1–2)	Loaiza (5–7)		11,113	26–42
69	June 17	Blue Jays	4–1	**Mota** (2–0)	Quantrill (5–1)	—	8,440	27–42
70	June 18	@ Mets	1–2	Wendell (3–2)	**Yoshii** (2–4)	Benítez (12)	32,569	27–43
71	June 19	@ Mets	1–4	White (1–0)	**Mota** (1–1)	Franco (2)	27,578	27–44
72	June 20	@ Mets	3–4	Leiter (4–5)	**Vázquez** (5–9)	Benítez (13)	28,617	27–45
73	June 21	@ Mets	10–3	**Blank** (2–2)	Appier (4–7)	—	32,668	28–45
74	June 22	@ Pirates	11–5	**Armas** (7–5)	Schmidt (3–3)	—	33,439	29–45
75	June 23	@ Pirates	4–7	Ritchie (3–8)	**Yoshii** (2–5)	Williams (14)	38,169	29–46
76	June 24	@ Pirates	11–4	**Mattes** (1–0)	Beimel (3–3)	—	36,826	30–46
77	June 25	@ Marlins	3–1	**Vázquez** (6–9)	Burnett (5–4)	**Urbina** (10)	10,300	31–46
78	June 26	@ Marlins	0–3	Penny (7–1)	**Thurman** (3–5)	Alfonseca (17)	11,180	31–47
79	June 27	@ Marlins	1–9	Sánchez (1–0)	**Armas** (7–6)	—	12,349	31–48
80	June 29	Pirates	12–3	**Mattes** (2–0)	Beimel (3–4)	—	6,504	32–48
81	June 30	Pirates	7–6	**Lloyd** (5–1)	Williams (2–3)	—	8,711	33–48

July (12–14)

#	Date	Opponent	Score	Win	Loss	Save	Attendance	Record
82	July 1	Pirates	9–3	**Thurman** (4–5)	Anderson (4–8)	—	6,631	34–48
83	July 3	Marlins	0–7	Dempster (9–8)	**Armas** (7–7)	—	4,690	34–49
84	July 4	Marlins	9–6	**Lloyd** (6–1)	Clement (4–6)	**Urbina** (11)	4,899	35–49
85	July 5	Marlins	9–6	**Vázquez** (7–9)	Smith (4–5)	**Urbina** (12)	5,253	36–49
86	July 6	@ Blue Jays	10–7	**Lloyd** (7–1)	Quantrill (7–2)	**Urbina** (12)	20,074	37–49
87	July 7	@ Blue Jays	8–9 (11)	Plesac (2–2)	**Strickland** (1–4)	—	23,976	37–50
88	July 8	@ Blue Jays	3–9	Michalak (6–6)	**Armas** (7–8)	—	31,012	37–51
**All–Star Break (July 9–11)**
89	July 12	Devil Rays	10–0	Sturtze (4–7)	**Mattes** (2–1)	—	4,877	37–52
90	July 13	Devil Rays	2–6	**Vázquez** (8–9)	Kennedy (3–3)	—	4,277	38–52
91	July 14	Devil Rays	10–2	**Armas** (8–8)	Rekar (1–11)	—	5,471	39–52
92	July 15	Red Sox	5–8	Nomo (9–4)	**Thurman** (4–6)	Lowe (17)	32,965	39–53
93	July 16	Red Sox	5–6	Pichardo (2–0)	**Lloyd** (7–2)	Lowe (18)	16,005	39–54
94	July 17	Red Sox	11–7	**Mattes** (3–1)	Wakefield (6–4)	—	13,348	40–54
95	July 18	Phillies	7–6	**Urbina** (1–1)	Cormier (5–2)	—	5,157	41–54
96	July 19	Phillies	5–2	**Strickland** (2–4)	Cormier (5–2)	**Urbina** (14)	10,242	42–54
97	July 20	@ Braves	6–3	**Thurman** (5–6)	Millwood (1–4)	**Urbina** (15)	32,842	43–54
98	July 21	@ Braves	1–2 (10)	Cabrera (6–2)	**Lloyd** (7–3)	—	46,363	43–55
99	July 22	@ Braves	2–8	Maddux (13–5)	**Mattes** (3–2)	—	29,082	43–56
100	July 23	@ Phillies	3–0	**Vázquez** (9–9)	Daal (10–3)	—	16,921	44–56
101	July 24	@ Phillies	2–10	Figueroa (2–2)	**Armas** (8–9)	—	16,6996	44–57
102	July 25	@ Phillies	4–8	Person (9–5)	**Thurman** (5–7)	—	27,555	44–58
103	July 26	Braves	3–2 (10)	Urbina' (2–1)	Reed (3–2)	—	7,635	45–58
104	July 27	Braves	3–7	Maddux (14–5)	**Mattes** (3–3)	—	8,299	45–59
105	July 28	Braves	5–10	Glavine (10–5)	**Vázquez** (9–10)	—	9,390	45–60
106	July 29	Braves	1–8	Burkett (8–8)	**Armas** (8–10)	—	9,802	45–61
107	July 31	@ Diamondbacks	1–3	Schilling (15–5)	**Muñoz** (0–1)		27,726	45–62

August (13-14)

#	Date	Opponent	Score	Win	Loss	Save	Attendance	Record
108	August 1	@ Diamondbacks	8–5	**Thurman** (6–7)	Anderson (3–3)	**Stewart** (1)	25,668	46–62
109	August 2	@ Diamondbacks	1–0	**Vázquez** (10–10)	Lopez (5–14)	**Stewart** (2)	28,688	47–62
110	August 3	@ Astros	2–6	Reynolds (10–10)	**Armas** (8–11)	—	31,134	47–63
111	August 4	@ Astros	1–4	Oswalt (9–2)	**Ohka** (2–6)	—	38,769	47–64
112	August 5	@ Astros	1–4	Villone (5–4)	**Muñoz** (0–2)	Wagner (25)	36,240	47–65
113	August 7	Cardinals	1–3	**Kile** (12–7)	**Vázquez** (10–11)	—	7,760	47–66
114	August 8	Cardinals	6–5 (11)	**Yoshii** (3–5)	Hackman (0–2)	—	6,611	48–66
115	August 9	Cardinals	6–9	**Morris** (14–7)	**Ohka** (2–7)	—	7,166	48–67
116	August 10	Brewers	1–5	Quevedo (1–1)	**Thurman** (6–8)	—	4,917	48–68
117	August 11	Brewers	0–6	Suzuki (3–8)	**Muñoz** (0–3)	—	5,843	48–69
118	August 12	Brewers	5–0	**Vázquez** (11–11)	Haynes (7–15)	—	6,280	49–69
119	August 14	@ Dodgers	4–1	**Lloyd** (8–3)	Shaw (3–3)	—	30,085	50–69
120	August 15	@ Dodgers	1–13	Carrara (10–6)	**Pavano** (0–1)	—	43,049	50–70
121	August 16	@ Dodgers	7–3	**Reames** (3–8)	Trombley (3–5)	—	30,347	51–70
122	August 17	@ Padres	4–0	**Vázquez** (12–11)	Lawrence (3–2)	—	22,513	52–70
123	August 18	@ Padres	3–4	Jones (8–14)	**Thurman** (6–9)	Hoffman (31)	31,485	52–71
124	August 19	@ Padres	2–1	**Armas** (9–11)	Herndon (1–2)	**Strickland** (1)	24,309	53–71
125	August 21	Giants	2–10	Ortiz (14–6)	**Pavano** (0–2)	—	8,937	53–72
126	August 22	Giants	7–1	**Vázquez** (13–11)	Estes (8–8)	—	8,217	54–72
127	August 23	Giants	5–10	Rodríguez (7–1)	**Lloyd** (8–4)		7,990	54–73
128	August 24	Reds	6–4	**Stewart** (1–0)	Brower (6–8)	**Strickland** (2)	5,191	55–73
129	August 25	Reds	2–4	Reitsma (6–13)	**Thurman** (6–10)	Graves (22)	6,852	55–74
130	August 26	Reds	4–17	Acevedo (4–5)	**Muñoz** (0–4)	—	11,783	55–75
131	August 28	@ Braves	7–0	**Vázquez** (14–11)	Millwood (4–6)	Mesa (37)	23,131	56–75
132	August 29	@ Braves	3–5	Glavine (12–7)	**Armas** (9–12)	Smoltz (3)	22,327	56–76
133	August 30	@ Braves	4–2	**Ohka** (3–7)	Marquis (3–6)	**Strickland** (3)	22,725	57–76
134	August 31	@ Phillies	5–1	**Thurman** (7–10)	Figueroa (8–12)	**Strickland** (4)	14,272	58–76

September (7-15)

#	Date	Opponent	Score	Win	Loss	Save	Attendance	Record
135	September 1	@ Phillies	1–4	Person (13–6)	**Pavano** (0–3)	Mesa (35)	16,770	58–77
136	September 2	@ Phillies	6–2	**Vázquez** (15–11)	Mesa (1–2)	—	20,871	59–77
137	September 3	Braves	0–5	Glavine (13–7)	**Ohka** (3–8)	—	6,748	59–78
138	September 4	Braves	2–3	Karsay (2–4)	**Strickland** (2–5)	—	3,613	59–79
139	September 5	Braves	10–4	**Thurman** (8–10)	Burkett (11–10)	—	3,806	60–79
140	September 6	Phillies	0–3	Person (14–6)	**Pavano** (0–4)	Mesa (36)	3,406	60–80
141	September 7	Phillies	4–2	**Vázquez** (16–11)	Duckworth (2–1)	**Stewart** (3)	4,451	61–80
142	September 8	Phillies	0–6	Wolf (7–10)	**Ohka** (3–9)	—	5,650	61–81
143	September 9	Phillies	4–12	Politte (2–2)	**Lloyd** (8–5)	—	5,480	61–82
—	September 11	@ Marlins	Postponed (September 11 attacks); Rescheduled for October 2.					
—	September 12	@ Marlins	Postponed (September 11 attacks); Rescheduled for October 3.					
—	September 13	@ Marlins	Postponed (September 11 attacks); Rescheduled for October 4.					
—	September 14	@ Mets	Postponed (September 11 attacks); Rescheduled for October 5.					
—	September 15	@ Mets	Postponed (September 11 attacks); Rescheduled for October 6.					
—	September 16	@ Mets	Postponed (September 11 attacks); Rescheduled for October 7.					
144	September 17	Marlins	6–10	Bones (4–4)	**Mota** (1–2)	—	3,013	61–83
145	September 18	Marlins	1–3	Penny (8–9)	**Thurman** (8–11)	Alfonseca (26)	2,917	61–84
146	September 19	Marlins	5–2	**Pavano** (1–4)	Beckett (1–1)	**Strickland** (5)	2,887	62–84
147	September 20	Rockies	8–3	**Lloyd** (9–5)	Powell (4–3)	—	3,037	63–84
148	September 21	Rockies	9–11 (11)	Davis (2–4)	**Mota** (1–3)	—	10,510	63–85
149	September 22	Rockies	3–1	**Yoshii** (4–5)	Elarton (4–9)	**Strickland** (6)	9,707	64–85
150	September 23	Rockies	3–5	Speier (4–2)	**Stewart** (1–1)	Jiménez (16)	9,282	64–86
151	September 25	Mets	0–2	Appier (9–10)	**Pavano** (1–5)	—	4,166	64–87
152	September 26	Mets	2–5	Rusch (8–10)	**Armas** (9–13)	Benítez (42)	5,314	64–88
153	September 27	Mets	6–12	White (4–5)	**Strickland** (2–6)	—	6,968	64–89
154	September 28	@ Reds	7–6	**Stewart** (2–1)	Graves (6–5)	**Strickland** (7)	18,762	65–89
155	September 29	@ Reds	4–7	Dessens (10–13)	**Yoshii** (4–6)	Graves (30)	20,490	65–90
156	September 30	@ Reds	4–5	Sullivan (6–1)	**Eischen** (0–1)	Graves (31)	20,394	65–91

October (3-3)

#	Date	Opponent	Score	Win	Loss	Save	Attendance	Record
157	October 2	@ Marlins	3–4	Burnett (10–12)	**Armas** (9–14)	Looper (2)	7,737	65–92
158	October 3	@ Marlins	2–0	**Stewart** (3–1)	Acevedo (2–5)	**Strickland** (8)	8,211	66–92
159	October 4	@ Marlins	2–6	Penny (10–10)	**Yoshii** (4–7)	—	8,091	66–93
160	October 5	@ Mets	8–6	**Thurman** (9–11)	Leiter (11–11)	**Strickland** (9)	10,281	67–93
161	October 6	@ Mets	0–4	Appier (11–10)	**Pavano** (1–6)	—	15,025	67–94
162	October 7	@ Mets	5–0	**Reames** (4–8)	Rusch (8–12)	—	15,540	68–94

=== Attendance ===
The Expos drew 642,745 fans during the 2001 season, and were 16th in attendance among the 16 National League teams. Their highest attendance for the season was for the home opener on April 6 against the New York Mets, which drew 45,183 fans, while their lowest was for a game on September 19 against the Florida Marlins, which only 2,887 fans attended.

== Player stats ==
=== Batting ===
Note: Pos = Position; G = Games played; AB = At bats; R = Runs scored; H = Hits; 2B = Doubles; 3B = Triples; HR = Home runs; RBI = Runs batted in; AVG = Batting average; SB = Stolen bases

Complete offensive statistics are available here.

Pos	Player	G	AB	R	H	2B	3B	HR	RBI	AVG	SB
C	Michael Barrett	132	472	42	118	32	2	6	38	.250	2
1B	Lee Stevens	152	542	77	133	35	1	25	95	.245	2
2B	José Vidro	124	486	82	155	34	1	15	59	.319	4
SS	Orlando Cabrera	162	626	64	173	41	6	14	96	.276	19
3B	Geoff Blum	148	453	57	107	25	0	9	50	.236	9
LF	Mark Smith	80	194	28	47	13	1	6	18	.242	0
CF	Peter Bergeron	102	375	53	79	11	4	3	16	.211	10
RF	Vladimir Guerrero	159	599	107	184	45	4	34	108	.307	37
IF	Mike Mordecai	96	254	28	71	17	2	3	32	.280	2
CF	Milton Bradley	67	220	19	49	16	3	1	19	.223	7
3B	Fernando Tatís	41	145	20	37	9	0	2	11	.255	0
LF	Brad Wilkerson	47	117	11	24	7	2	1	5	.205	2
3B	Ryan Minor	55	95	10	15	2	0	2	13	.158	0
C	Randy Knorr	34	91	13	20	2	0	3	10	.220	0
LF	Tim Raines	47	78	13	24	8	1	0	4	.308	1
LF	Curtis Pride	36	76	8	19	3	1	1	9	.250	3
OF	Terry Jones	30	77	8	20	5	0	0	2	.260	3
UT	Andy Tracy	38	55	4	6	1	0	2	8	.109	0
UT	Rob Ducey	27	46	6	11	2	0	2	8	.239	0
UT	Fernando Seguignol	46	50	0	7	2	0	0	0	.140	0
C	Brian Schneider	27	41	4	13	3	0	1	6	.317	0
2B	Henry Mateo	5	9	1	3	1	0	0	0	.333	0
C	Sandy Martínez	1	1	0	0	0	0	0	0	.000	0
PH	Tomás de la Rosa	1	1	0	0	0	0	0	0	.000	0
P	Javier Vázquez	31	62	5	16	2	0	0	1	.258	0
P	Tony Armas Jr.	32	53	2	8	1	0	0	4	.151	0
P	Mike Thurman	27	42	0	1	0	0	0	0	.024	0
P	Britt Reames	47	17	2	2	0	1	2	2	.118	0
P	Masato Yoshii	39	16	0	2	0	0	0	0	.125	0
P	Tomo Ohka	10	15	1	3	0	0	0	1	.200	0
P	Troy Mattes	8	15	4	7	1	0	0	1	.467	0
P	Carl Pavano	8	13	0	1	0	0	0	0	.077	0
P	Chris Peters	13	11	1	1	0	0	0	0	.091	0
P	Bobby Muñoz	15	11	0	0	0	0	0	0	.000	0
P	Matt Blank	4	8	0	4	1	0	0	0	.500	0
P	Scott Strickland	75	3	0	0	0	0	0	0	.000	0
P	Graeme Lloyd	79	2	0	0	0	0	0	0	.000	0
P	Hideki Irabu	2	3	0	0	0	0	0	0	.000	0
P	Guillermo Mota	49	3	0	1	0	0	0	0	.333	0
P	Mike Johnson	10	1	0	0	0	0	0	0	.000	0
P	Ugueth Urbina	42	1	0	0	0	0	0	0	.000	0
P	Darwin Cubillán	26	0	0	0	0	0	0	0	–	0
P	Felipe Lira	4	0	0	0	0	0	0	0	–	0
P	Anthony Telford	8	0	0	0	0	0	0	0	–	0
P	Bob Scanlan	15	0	0	0	0	0	0	0	–	0
P	Joey Eischen	24	0	0	0	0	0	0	0	–	0
P	Scott Stewart	57	0	0	0	0	0	0	0	–	0
	Team totals	162	5379	670	1361	320	28	131	622	.253	101

=== Pitching ===
Note: Pos = Position; W = Wins; L = Losses; ERA = Earned run average; G = Games pitched; GS = Games started; SV = Saves; IP = Innings pitched; H = Hits allowed; R = Runs allowed; ER = Earned runs allowed; BB = Walks allowed; K = Strikeouts

Complete pitching statistics are available here.

Pos	Player	W	L	ERA	G	GS	SV	IP	H	R	ER	BB	K
SP	Javier Vázquez	16	11	3.42	32	32	0	223.2	197	92	85	44	208
SP	Tony Armas Jr.	9	14	4.03	34	34	0	196.2	180	101	88	91	176
SP	Mike Thurman	9	11	5.33	28	26	0	147.0	172	90	87	50	96
CL	Ugueth Urbina	2	1	4.24	45	0	15	46.2	42	24	22	21	57
RP	Scott Strickland	2	6	3.21	77	0	9	81.1	67	36	29	41	85
RP	Graeme Lloyd	9	5	4.35	84	0	1	70.1	74	38	34	21	44
RP	Guillermo Mota	1	3	5.26	53	0	0	49.2	51	30	29	18	31
RP	Scott Stewart	3	1	3.78	62	0	0	47.2	43	20	20	13	39
	Masato Yoshii	4	7	4.78	42	11	0	113.0	127	65	60	18	63
	Britt Reames	4	8	5.59	41	13	0	95.0	101	68	59	48	86
	Tomo Ohka	1	4	4.77	10	10	0	54.2	65	30	29	10	31
	Troy Mattes	3	3	6.00	8	8	0	45.0	51	33	30	21	26
	Carl Pavano	1	6	6.33	8	8	0	42.2	59	33	30	16	36
	Bobby Muñoz	0	4	5.14	15	7	0	42.0	53	25	24	21	21
	Chris Peters	2	4	7.55	13	6	0	31.0	47	26	26	15	14
	Joey Eischen	0	1	4.85	24	0	0	29.2	29	17	16	16	19
	Darwin Cubillán	0	0	4.10	29	0	0	26.1	31	13	12	12	19
	Bob Scanlan	0	0	7.86	18	3	0	26.1	37	23	23	14	5
	Matt Blank	2	2	5.16	5	4	0	22.2	23	14	13	13	11
	Hideki Irabu	0	2	4.86	3	3	0	16.2	22	9	9	3	18
	Mike Johnson	0	0	4.76	10	0	0	11.1	13	6	6	4	10
	Anthony Telford	0	1	10.29	8	0	0	7.0	14	12	8	5	5
	Felipe Lira	0	0	12.60	4	0	0	5.0	11	7	7	2	3
	Team totals	68	94	4.68	162	162	28	1431.1	1509	812	745	525	1103

== Award winners ==
- Javier Vázquez, National League Pitcher of the Month, July

2001 Major League Baseball All-Star Game

- Vladimir Guerrero, Outfield, Reserve

== Farm system ==
Level	Team	League	Manager
AAA	Ottawa Lynx	International League	Stan Hough
AA	Harrisburg Senators	Eastern League	Luis Dorante
A	Jupiter Hammerheads	Florida State League	Tim Leiper
A	Clinton LumberKings	Midwest League	Steve Phillips
A-Short Season	Vermont Expos	New York–Penn League	Steve Balboni
Rookie	GCL Expos	Gulf Coast League	Dave Dangler
