= 2001 New York Mets season =

2001 New York Mets
- League: National League
- Division: East
- Ballpark: Shea Stadium
- City: New York
- Record: 82–80 (.506)
- Divisional place: 3rd
- Owners: Nelson Doubleday Jr., Fred Wilpon
- General manager: Steve Phillips
- Manager: Bobby Valentine
- Television: WPIX (Tom Seaver, Gary Thorne); Fox Sports New York (Ralph Kiner, Fran Healy, Howie Rose)
- Radio: WFAN (Bob Murphy, Gary Cohen, Ed Coleman); WADO (spanish) (Juan Alicea, Billy Berroa)

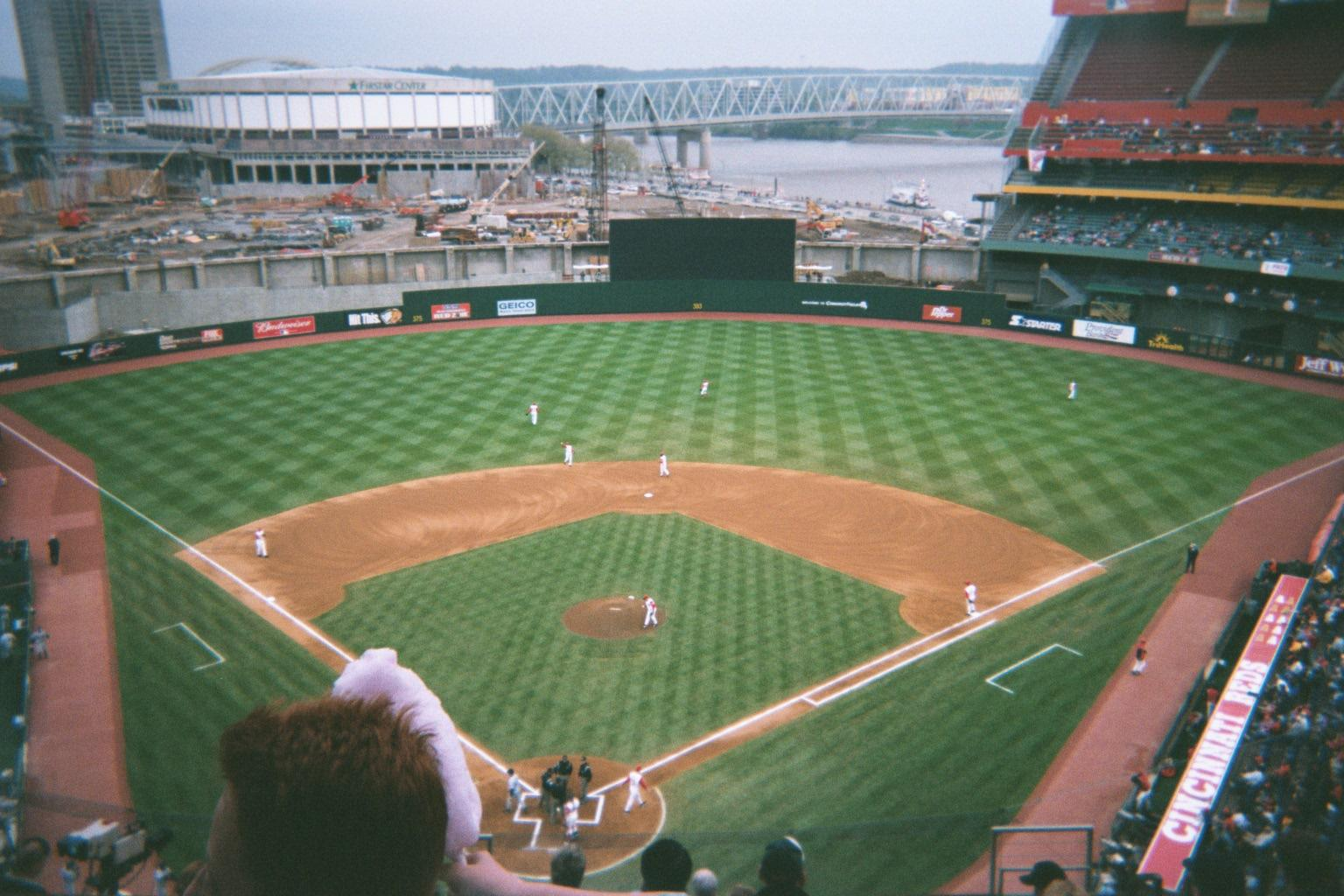
The Mets playing against the Cincinnati Reds during an April 2001 away game at Cinergy Field.

The 2001 New York Mets season was the 40th regular season for the Mets. The 2001 Mets entered the season as defending National League champions, aiming to win the National League East from the Braves and return to a second consecutive World Series and win it. The Mets went 82–80 and finished third in the National League East, six games behind the first place Atlanta Braves. Despite the winning record, the Mets were outscored on the season, 642 runs to 713 allowed, and it would prove to be their last winning season until 2005. They were managed by Bobby Valentine. They played home games at Shea Stadium.

== Offseason ==
- December 6, 2000: Turk Wendell was signed as a free agent with the New York Mets.
- December 11, 2000: Tsuyoshi Shinjo was purchased by the New York Mets from the Hanshin Tigers (Japan Central).
- January 5, 2001: Jorge Velandia was signed as a free agent with the New York Mets.

== Regular season ==
The Mets played the first game in New York after the attacks on the World Trade Center on September 11. The game was played on September 21 and it was a 3–2 victory over the Atlanta Braves, thanks to a go-ahead two-run home run from Mike Piazza in the eighth inning which is still largely relevant.

=== Opening Day starters ===
- Edgardo Alfonzo
- Kevin Appier
- Darryl Hamilton
- Rey Ordóñez
- Jay Payton
- Mike Piazza
- Tsuyoshi Shinjo
- Robin Ventura
- Todd Zeile

=== Season standings ===
NL East
Team	W	L	Pct.	GB	Home	Road
Atlanta Braves	88	74	.543	—	40‍–‍41	48‍–‍33
Philadelphia Phillies	86	76	.531	2	47‍–‍34	39‍–‍42
New York Mets	82	80	.506	6	44‍–‍37	38‍–‍43
Florida Marlins	76	86	.469	12	46‍–‍34	30‍–‍52
Montreal Expos	68	94	.420	20	34‍–‍47	34‍–‍47

=== Record vs. opponents ===
2001 National League record Source: MLB Standings Grid – 2001
Team	AZ	ATL	CHC	CIN	COL	FLA	HOU	LAD	MIL	MON	NYM	PHI	PIT	SD	SF	STL	AL
Arizona	—	5–2	6–3	5–1	13–6	4–2	2–4	10–9	3–3	3–3	3–3	3–4	4–2	12–7	10–9	2–4	7–8
Atlanta	2–5	—	4–2	4–2	4–2	9–10	3–3	2–5	3–3	13–6	10–9	10–9	5–1	3–3	4–2	3–3	9–9
Chicago	3–6	2–4	—	13–4	3–3	3–3	8–9	4–2	8–9	3–3	4–2	4–2	10–6	2–4	3–3	9–8	9–6
Cincinnati	1–5	2–4	4–13	—	3–6	4–2	6–11	4–2	6–10	4–2	4–2	2–4	9–8	2–4	4–2	7–10	4–11
Colorado	6–13	2–4	3–3	6–3	—	4–2	2–4	8–11	5–1	3–4	4–3	2–4	2–4	9–10	9–10	6–3	2–10
Florida	2–4	10–9	3–3	2–4	2–4	—	3–3	2–5	4–2	12–7	7–12	5–14	4–2	3–4	2–4	3–3	12–6
Houston	4–2	3–3	9–8	11–6	4–2	3–3	—	2–4	12–5	6–0	3–3	3–3	9–8	3–6	3–3	9–7	9–6
Los Angeles	9–10	5–2	2–4	2–4	11–8	5–2	4–2	—	5–1	2–4	2–4	3–3	7–2	9–10	11–8	3–3	6–9
Milwaukee	3–3	3–3	9–8	10–6	1–5	2–4	5–12	1–5	—	4–2	3–3	3–3	6–11	1–5	5–4	7–10	5–10
Montreal	3–3	6–13	3–3	2–4	4–3	7–12	0–6	4–2	2–4	—	8–11	9–10	5–1	3–3	2–5	2–4	8–10
New York	3–3	9–10	2–4	2–4	3–4	12–7	3–3	4–2	3–3	11–8	—	11–8	4–2	1–5	3–4	1–5	10–8
Philadelphia	4–3	9–10	2–4	4–2	4–2	14–5	3–3	3–3	3–3	10–9	8–11	—	5–1	5–2	3–3	2–4	7–11
Pittsburgh	2–4	1–5	6–10	8–9	4–2	2–4	8–9	2–7	11–6	1–5	2–4	1–5	—	2–4	1–5	3–14	8–7
San Diego	7–12	3–3	4–2	4–2	10–9	4–3	6–3	10–9	5–1	3–3	5–1	2–5	4–2	—	5–14	1–5	6–9
San Francisco	9–10	2–4	3–3	2–4	10–9	4–2	3–3	8–11	4–5	5–2	4–3	3–3	5–1	14–5	—	4–2	10–5
St. Louis	4–2	3–3	8–9	10–7	3–6	3–3	7–9	3–3	10–7	4–2	5–1	4–2	14–3	5–1	2–4	—	8–7

=== Notable transactions ===
- May 9, 2001: Doug Linton was signed as a free agent with the New York Mets.
- June 5, 2001: David Wright was drafted by the New York Mets in the 1st round (38th pick) of the 2001 amateur draft. Player signed July 12, 2001.
- July 23, 2001: Todd Pratt was traded by the New York Mets to the Philadelphia Phillies for Gary Bennett.
- July 25, 2001: Doug Linton was purchased by the LG Twins of Korea from the New York Mets.
- July 27, 2001: Turk Wendell was traded by the New York Mets with Dennis Cook to the Philadelphia Phillies for Bruce Chen and Adam Walker (minors).
- July 30, 2001: Rick Reed was traded by the New York Mets to the Minnesota Twins for Matt Lawton.

=== Game log ===
2001 Game Log
Overall: 82–80 (Home: 44–37; Away: 38–43)
April: (10–15) Home: 5–5; Away: 5–10

#	Date	Opponent	Score	Win	Loss	Save	Location	Attendance	Record
1	April 3	@ Braves	6–4 (10)	Cook (1–0)	Lightenberg (0–1)	Benitez (1)	Turner Field	42,117	1–0
2	April 4	@ Braves	2–3	Rocker (1–0)	Wall (0–1)	—	Turner Field	27,924	1–1
3	April 5	@ Braves	7–1	Reed (1–0)	Perez (0–1)	—	Turner Field	34,219	2–1
4	April 6	@ Expos	6–10	Thurman (1–0)	Rose (0–1)	—	Olympic Stadium	45,183	2–2
5	April 7	@ Expos	0–10	Vazquez (1–0)	Trachsel (0–1)		Olympic Stadium	15,317	2–3
6	April 8	@ Expos	2–5	Peters (1–0)	Leiter (0–1)	Urbina (3)	Olympic Stadium	11,321	2–4
7	April 9	Braves	9–4	Appier (1–0)	Millwood (0–1)	—	Shea Stadium	53,640	3–4
8	April 11	Braves	0–2	Maddux (2–0)	Reed (1–1)	Rocker (2)	Shea Stadium	36,048	3–5
9	April 12	Braves	1–0 (10)	Benitez (1–0)	Lightenberg (0–2)	—	Shea Stadium	27,694	4–5
10	April 13	Reds	2–3	Fernandez (2–1)	Trachsel (0–2)	Graves (2)	Shea Stadium	38,243	4–6
11	April 14	Reds	0–1	Reitsma (2–0)	Leiter (0–2)	Graves (3)	Shea Stadium	55,067	4–7
12	April 15	Reds	1–3	Brower (1–0)	Appier (1–1)	Graves (4)	Shea Stadium	39,643	4–8
13	April 16	Expos	4–3	Reed (2–1)	Thurman (1–2)	Benitez (2)	Shea Stadium	18,241	5–8
14	April 17	Expos	4–0	Rusch (1–0)	Peters (1–1)	—	Shea Stadium	20,177	6–8
15	April 18	Expos	1–7	Vazquez (2–1)	Trachsel (0–3)	—	Shea Stadium	20,721	6–9
16	April 20	@ Reds	5–9	Fernandez (3–1)	Leiter (0–3)	Brower (1)	Cinergy Field	26,557	6–10
17	April 21	@ Reds	5–2	Appier (2–1)	Reitsma (2–1)	Benitez (3)	Cinergy Field	28,135	7–10
18	April 22	@ Reds	5–1	Reed (3–1)	Dessens (1–1)	—	Cinergy Field	30,682	8–10
19	April 24	@ Brewers	4–6	DeJean (2–0)	Wall (0–2)	Leskanic (2)	Miller Park	27,404	8–11
20	April 25	@ Brewers	2–7	Haynes (2–2)	Trachsel (0–4)	Weathers (3)	Miller Park	30,353	8–12
21	April 26	@ Brewers	8–12	Fox (1–0)	Hinchliffe (0–1)	—	Miller Park	25,233	8–13
22	April 27	@ Cardinals	0–9	Morris (3–2)	Appier (2–2)	—	Busch Stadium	40,674	8–14
23	April 28	@ Cardinals	6–5 (11)	Benitez (2–0)	James (1–2)	—	Busch Stadium	43,843	9–14
24	April 29	@ Cardinals	1–12	Kile (4–2)	Rusch (1–1)	—	Busch Stadium	38,401	9–15
25	April 30	Astros	8–2	Trachsel (1–4)	Elarton (3–3)	—	Shea Stadium	19,083	10–15

May: (12–17) Home: 9–9; Away: 3–8

#	Date	Opponent	Score	Win	Loss	Save	Location	Attendance	Record
26	May 1	Astros	7–5	Martin (1–0)	Cruz (0–1)	Benitez (4)	Shea Stadium	25,619	11–15
27	May 2	Astros	5–6 (10)	Wagner (1–1)	Benitez (2–1)	—	Shea Stadium	23,262	11–16
28	May 4	Diamondbacks	4–2	Reed (4–1)	Batista (0–1)	Franco (1)	Shea Stadium	36,945	12–16
29	May 5	Diamondbacks	8–1	Rusch (2–1)	Ellis (3–1)	—	Shea Stadium	35,630	13–16
30	May 6	Diamondbacks	2–8	Schilling (5–0)	Trachsel (1–5)	—	Shea Stadium	37,673	13–17
31	May 7	@ Rockies	10–9	Gonzalez (1–0)	Bohanon (1–4)	—	Coors Field	34,644	14–17
32	May 8	@ Rockies	4–12	Astacio (4–2)	Appier (2–3)	—	Coors Field	36,602	14–18
33	May 9	@ Rockies	0–6	Hampton (5–0)	Reed (4–2)	—	Coors Field	35,952	14–19
34	May 10	@ Rockies	2–8	Chacon (1–1)	Rusch (2–2)	—	Coors Field	40,603	14–20
35	May 11	@ Giants	2–3 (10)	Nen (2–0)	Wall (0–3)	—	Pacific Bell Park	41,059	14–21
36	May 12	@ Giants	3–10	Ortiz (6–1)	Gonzalez (1–1)	—	Pacific Bell Park	41,059	14–22
37	May 13	@ Giants	3–6	Zerbe (1–0)	Appier (2–4)	—	Pacific Bell Park	41,059	14–23
38	May 15	Padres	1–0	Reed (5–2)	Jones (1–5)	Benitez (5)	Shea Stadium	21,490	15–23
39	May 16	Padres	2–5	Eaton (5–2)	Rusch (2–3)	Hoffman (6)	Shea Stadium	20,134	15–24
40	May 17	Padres	3–15	Williams (4–3)	Trachsel (1–6)	—	Shea Stadium	18,476	15–25
41	May 18	Dodgers	8–0	Leiter (1–3)	Brown (5–2)	Wendell (1)	Shea Stadium	37,502	16–25
42	May 19	Dodgers	2–10	Prokopec (5–1)	Appier (2–5)	—	Shea Stadium	46,346	16–26
43	May 20	Dodgers	6–5	Benitez (3–1)	Adams (2–2)	—	Shea Stadium	43,404	17–26
44	May 21	@ Expos	6–3	Rusch (3–3)	Reames (2–6)	Benitez (6)	Olympic Stadium	5,449	18–26
45	May 22	@ Expos	0–3	Armas (4–5)	Gonzalez (1–2)	Urbina (7)	Olympic Stadium	4,186	18–27
46	May 23	@ Expos	4–2	Leiter (2–3)	Peters (2–4)	Benitez (7)	Olympic Stadium	5,292	19–27
47	May 24	Marlins	11–3	Appier (3–5)	Burnett (2–2)	—	Shea Stadium	22,877	20–27
48	May 25	Marlins	4–3 (10)	Franco (1–0)	Miceli (0–3)	—	Shea Stadium	40,456	21–27
49	May 26	Marlins	3–7	Dempster (4–6)	Rusch (3–4)	—	Shea Stadium	29,839	21–28
50	May 27	Marlins	5–4	Wendell (1–0)	Miceli (0–4)	Benitez (8)	Shea Stadium	41,991	22–28
51	May 28	Phillies	3–5 (10)	Mesa (1–0)	Benitez (3–2)	Cormier (1)	Shea Stadium	33,791	22–29
52	May 29	Phillies	3–7	Gomes (4–1)	Cook (1–1)	—	Shea Stadium	26,579	22–30
53	May 30	Phillies	3–6	Padilla (2–1)	Franco (1–1)	Mesa (15)	Shea Stadium	24,077	22–31
54	May 31	@ Marlins	3–5	Dempster (5–6)	Wendell (1–1)	Alfonseca (11)	Pro Player Stadium	13,295	22–32

June: (13–15) Home: 4–6; Away: 9–9

#	Date	Opponent	Score	Win	Loss	Save	Location	Attendance	Record
55	June 1	@ Marlins	11–5	Gonzalez (2–2)	Clement (2–5)	—	Pro Player Stadium	23,252	23–32
56	June 2	@ Marlins	7–1	Leiter (3–3)	Smith (3–1)	—	Pro Player Stadium	33,061	24–32
57	June 3	@ Marlins	0–1	Alfonseca (3–2)	Wendell (1–2)	—	Pro Player Stadium	22,483	24–33
58	June 5	@ Phillies	9–0	R. Reed (6–2)	Person (4–5)	—	Veterans Stadium	22,060	25–33
59	June 6	@ Phillies	1–6	Telemaco (5–1)	Rusch (3–5)	—	Veterans Stadium	32,703	25–34
60	June 7	@ Phillies	6–5	Franco (2–1)	Mesa (1–1)	Benitez (9)	Veterans Stadium	20,636	26–34
61	June 8	@ Devil Rays	5–7	Rupe (3–5)	Trachsel (1–7)	Yan (6)	Tropicana Field	15,547	26–35
62	June 9	@ Devil Rays	2–5	Sturtze (3–5)	Leiter (3–4)	Phelps (2)	Tropicana Field	19,235	26–36
63	June 10	@ Devil Rays	10–0	Appier (4–5)	Lopez (3–8)	—	Tropicana Field	19,994	27–36
64	June 12	@ Orioles	10–3	R. Reed (7–2)	Mercedes (1–8)	White (1)	Oriole Park at Camden Yards	34,812	28–36
65	June 13	@ Orioles	7–6 (10)	Franco (3–1)	Groom (1–2)	Benitez (10)	Oriole Park at Camden Yards	34,881	29–36
66	June 14	@ Orioles	2–5	Towers (4–1)	Trachsel (1–8)	Groom (3)	Oriole Park at Camden Yards	37,853	29–37
67	June 15	Yankees	4–5	Mendoza (4–2)	Leiter (3–5)	Rivera (20)	Shea Stadium	54,110	29–38
68	June 16	Yankees	1–2	Mussina (6–7)	Appier (4–6)	Rivera (21)	Shea Stadium	54,195	29–39
69	June 17	Yankees	8–7	Wendell (2–2)	Almanzar (0–1)	Benitez (11)	Shea Stadium	54,399	30–39
70	June 18	Expos	2–1	Wendell (3–2)	Yoshii (2–4)	Benitez (12)	Shea Stadium	32,569	31–39
71	June 19	Expos	4–1	White (1–0)	Mota (1–1)	Franco (2)	Shea Stadium	27,578	32–39
72	June 20	Expos	4–3	Leiter (4–5)	Vazquez (5–9)	Benitez (13)	Shea Stadium	28,617	33–39
73	June 21	Expos	3–10	Blank (2–2)	Appier (4–7)	—	Shea Stadium	32,668	33–40
74	June 22	Braves	1–10	Perez (5–5)	R. Reed (7–3)	—	Shea Stadium	40,129	33–41
75	June 23	Braves	3–9 (11)	S. Reed (2–1)	White (1–1)	—	Shea Stadium	42,736	33–42
76	June 24	Braves	4–8	Marquis (2–1)	Trachsel (1–9)	—	Shea Stadium	47,181	33–43
77	June 25	@ Cubs	1–2	Tavarez (6–4)	Leiter (4–6)	Gordon (12)	Wrigley Field	40,229	33–44
78	June 26	@ Cubs	2–4	Lieber (9–4)	Appier (4–8)	Gordon (13)	Wrigley Field	37,854	33–45
79	June 27	@ Cubs	5–4	White (2–1)	Farnsworth (0–3)	Benitez (14)	Wrigley Field	39,404	34–45
80	June 28	@ Braves	2–6 (10)	S. Reed (3–1)	Benitez (3–3)	—	Turner Field	40,055	34–46
81	June 29	@ Braves	3–1	Trachsel (2–9)	Marquis (2–2)	Benitez (15)	Turner Field	48,168	35–46
82	June 30	@ Braves	2–5	Maddux (9–5)	Leiter (4–7)	Karsay (2)	Turner Field	49,568	35–47

July: (14–11) Home: 10–5; Away: 4–6

#	Date	Opponent	Score	Win	Loss	Save	Location	Attendance	Record
83	July 1	@ Braves	2–1	Appier (5–8)	Burkett (6–6)	Benitez (16)	Turner Field	37,516	36–47
84	July 3	Cubs	0–3	Wood (8–5)	Reed (7–4)	Gordon (15)	Shea Stadium	52,471	36–48
85	July 4	Cubs	2–1	Rusch (4–5)	Tapani (8–6)	Benitez (17)	Shea Stadium	37,936	37–48
86	July 5	Cubs	4–13	Bere (6–4)	Trachsel (2–10)	—	Shea Stadium	30,737	37–49
87	July 6	@ Yankees	3–8	Pettitte (9–4)	Leiter (4–8)	Mendoza (3)	Yankee Stadium	55,534	37–50
88	July 7	@ Yankees	3–0 (10)	Franco (4–1)	Rivera (2–4)	Benitez (18)	Yankee Stadium	55,589	38–50
89	July 8	@ Yankees	1–4	Mendoza (6–2)	Wendell (3–3)	Rivera (29)	Yankee Stadium	55,528	38–51
72nd All-Star Game in Seattle, Washington
90	July 12	Red Sox	4–2	Leiter (5–8)	Wakefield (6–3)	Benitez (19)	Shea Stadium	37,698	39–51
91	July 13	Red Sox	1–3	Cone (5–1)	Appier (5–9)	Lowe (16)	Shea Stadium	42,219	39–52
92	July 14	Red Sox	2–0	Rusch (5–5)	Arrojo (2–3)	Benitez (20)	Shea Stadium	52,006	40–52
93	July 15	Blue Jays	6–2	Reed (8–4)	Michalak (6–7)	—	Shea Stadium	32,138	41–52
94	July 16	Blue Jays	3–0	Trachsel (3–10)	Halladay (0–1)	Benitez (21)	Shea Stadium	34,203	42–52
95	July 17	Blue Jays	1–0	Leiter (6–8)	Carpenter (7–6)	Benitez (22)	Shea Stadium	26,630	43–52
96	July 18	Marlins	4–3 (11)	Wendell (4–3)	Nunez (2–3)	—	Shea Stadium	24,545	44–52
97	July 19	Marlins	3–8	Dempster (11–8)	Rusch (5–6)	—	Shea Stadium	33,129	44–53
98	July 20	@ Phillies	1–10	Person (8–5)	Reed (8–5)	—	Veterans Stadium	22,886	44–54
99	July 21	@ Phillies	6–3	Trachsel (4–10)	Wolf (5–10)	Benitez (23)	Veterans Stadium	33,181	45–54
100	July 22	@ Phillies	2–3	Santiago (3–4)	Franco (4–2)	Mesa (26)	Veterans Stadium	30,812	45–55
–	July 23	@ Marlins	Postponed (rain); rescheduled for September 6						
101	July 24	@ Marlins	3–4	Bones (3–3)	Appier (5–10)	Alfonseca (19)	Pro Player Stadium	16,270	45–56
102	July 25	@ Marlins	5–2	Rusch (6–6)	Dempster (11–9)	Benitez (24)	Pro Player Stadium	18,272	46–56
103	July 26	Phillies	2–3	Santiago (4–4)	Reed (8–6)	Mesa (27)	Shea Stadium	38,468	46–57
104	July 27	Phillies	6–1	Trachsel (5–10)	Coggin (1–1)	—	Shea Stadium	31,263	47–57
105	July 28	Phillies	4–3	Benitez (4–3)	Wendell (4–4)	—	Shea Stadium	38,972	48–57
106	July 29	Phillies	6–5	Benitez (5–3)	Cormier (5–4)	—	Shea Stadium	38,536	49–57
107	July 31	@ Astros	2–3 (10)	Cruz (2–1)	Riggan (0–1)	—	Enron Field	33,006	49–58

August: (15–13) Home: 11–6; Away: 4–7

#	Date	Opponent	Score	Win	Loss	Save	Location	Attendance	Record
108	August 1	@ Astros	8–2 (10)	White (3–1)	Jackson (2–2)	—	Enron Field	33,124	50–58
109	August 2	@ Astros	3–4 (10)	Williams (3–4)	Riggan (0–2)	—	Enron Field	34,257	50–59
110	August 3	@ Diamondbacks	0–7	Johnson (14–5)	Leiter (6–9)	—	Bank One Ballpark	43,806	50–60
111	August 4	@ Diamondbacks	4–2	Appier (6–10)	Batista (6–7)	Benitez (25)	Bank One Ballpark	36,750	51–60
112	August 5	@ Diamondbacks	1–2	Schilling (16–5)	White (3–2)	Kim (9)	Bank One Ballpark	36,870	51–61
113	August 7	Brewers	3–0	Chen (5–5)	Haynes (7–14)	Benitez (26)	Shea Stadium	27,240	52–61
114	August 8	Brewers	5–4	Trachsel (6–10)	Levrault (5–7)	Benitez (27)	Shea Stadium	34,619	53–61
115	August 9	Brewers	4–3	Leiter (7–9)	DeJean (3–2)	White (2)	Shea Stadium	27,989	54–61
116	August 10	Cardinals	6–7 (10)	Veres (2–2)	White (3–3)	Karsay (7)	Shea Stadium	32,844	54–62
117	August 11	Cardinals	3–6	Hermanson (10–9)	Rusch (6–7)	Veres (12)	Shea Stadium	38,837	54–63
118	August 12	Cardinals	1–4	Kile (13–7)	Chen (5–6)	Veres (13)	Shea Stadium	38,939	54–64
119	August 14	@ Padres	0–6	Herdon (1–1)	Trachsel (6–11)	—	Qualcomm Stadium	24,803	54–65
120	August 15	@ Padres	1–2	Jarvis (10–9)	Leiter (7–10)	Hoffman (29)	Qualcomm Stadium	20,838	54–66
121	August 16	@ Padres	5–6	Fikac (1–0)	White (3–4)	Hoffman (30)	Qualcomm Stadium	22,614	54–67
122	August 17	@ Dodgers	3–8	Adams (9–5)	Rusch (6–8)	—	Dodger Stadium	41,801	54–68
123	August 18	@ Dodgers	5–4	Riggan (1–2)	Trombley (3–6)	Benitez (28)	Dodger Stadium	54,092	55–68
124	August 19	@ Dodgers	6–5	Trachsel (7–11)	Park (11–9)	Benitez (29)	Dodger Stadium	49,395	56–68
125	August 21	Rockies	5–2	Leiter (8–10)	Hampton (12–10)	Benitez (30)	Shea Stadium	28,510	57–68
126	August 22	Rockies	2–1	Appier (7–10)	Chacon (6–8)	Benitez (31)	Shea Stadium	34,415	58–68
127	August 23	Rockies	0–10	Jennings (1–0)	Rusch (6–9)	—	Shea Stadium	27,430	58–69
128	August 24	Giants	4–3	Chen (6–6)	Rueter (12–9)	Benitez (32)	Shea Stadium	35,973	59–69
129	August 25	Giants	3–2 (11)	Riggan (2–2)	Nen (3–3)	—	Shea Stadium	48,298	60–69
130	August 26	Giants	6–5	Leiter (9–10)	Ortiz (14–7)	Benitez (33)	Shea Stadium	36,061	61–69
131	August 27	Giants	5–6	Rodriguez (8–1)	White (3–5)	Nen (37)	Shea Stadium	27,084	61–70
132	August 28	Phillies	6–9 (11)	Politte (1–2)	Wall (0–4)	Bottalico (3)	Shea Stadium	21,745	61–71
133	August 29	Phillies	7–5	Chen (7–6)	Daal (12–5)	Benitez (34)	Shea Stadium	24,144	62–71
134	August 30	Phillies	6–2	Trachsel (8–11)	Coggin (4–4)	—	Shea Stadium	33,734	63–71
135	August 31	Marlins	6–1	Leiter (10–10)	Penny (7–8)	—	Shea Stadium	23,020	64–71

September: (16–5) Home: 3–2; Away: 13–3

#	Date	Opponent	Score	Win	Loss	Save	Location	Attendance	Record
136	September 1	Marlins	3–2 (11)	Roberts (1–0)	Acevedo (0–3)	—	Shea Stadium	39,486	65–71
137	September 2	Marlins	1–5	Dempster (15–11)	Rusch (6–10)	—	Shea Stadium	32,702	65–72
138	September 3	@ Phillies	10–7	Nitkowski (1–3)	Mesa (1–3)	Benitez (35)	Veterans Stadium	26,891	66–72
139	September 4	@ Phillies	5–3	Trachsel (9–11)	Daal (12–6)	Benitez (36)	Veterans Stadium	14,020	67–72
140	September 5	@ Phillies	7–4	Leiter (11–10)	Coggin (4–5)	—	Veterans Stadium	16,089	68–72
141	September 6	@ Marlins	5–2	Appier (8–10)	Penny (7–9)	Benitez (37)	Pro Player Stadium	10,188	69–72
142	September 7	@ Marlins	6–1	Rusch (7–10)	Burnett (9–11)	—	Pro Player Stadium	13,285	70–72
143	September 8	@ Marlins	9–7	Franco (5–2)	Alfonseca (3–4)	Benitez (38)	Pro Player Stadium	20,217	71–72
144	September 9	@ Marlins	2–4	Acevedo (1–3)	Trachsel (9–12)	Alfonseca (25)	Pro Player Stadium	14,821	71–73
–	September 11	@ Pirates	Postponed (9/11 attacks); rescheduled for October 1 in New York						
–	September 12	@ Pirates	Postponed (9/11 attacks); rescheduled for October 2 in New York						
–	September 13	@ Pirates	Postponed (9/11 attacks); rescheduled for October 3 in New York						
–	September 14	Expos	Postponed (9/11 attacks); rescheduled for October 5						
–	September 15	Expos	Postponed (9/11 attacks); rescheduled for October 6						
–	September 16	Expos	Postponed (9/11 attacks); rescheduled for October 7						
145	September 17	@ Pirates (Note: This three-game series was originally scheduled in New York, but Shea Stadium is used as a staging area for recovery efforts during the 9/11 attacks.)	4–1	Franco (6–2)	Fetters (3–2)	Benitez (39)	PNC Park	25,902	72–73
146	September 18	@ Pirates	7–5	Riggan (3–2)	Olivares (6–8)	Benitez (40)	PNC Park	19,285	73–73
147	September 19	@ Pirates	9–2	Gonzalez (3–2)	McKnight (3–4)	—	PNC Park	20,371	74–73
148	September 21	Braves	3–2	Benitez (6–3)	Karsay (3–5)	—	Shea Stadium	41,235	75–73
149	September 22	Braves	7–3	Trachsel (10–12)	Perez (6–8)	Benitez (41)	Shea Stadium	41,230	76–73
150	September 23	Braves	4–5 (10)	Smoltz (3–3)	Riggan (3–3)	—	Shea Stadium	41,168	76–74
151	September 25	@ Expos	2–0	Appier (9–10)	Pavano (1–5)	—	Olympic Stadium	4,166	77–74
152	September 26	@ Expos	5–2	Rusch (8–10)	Armas (9–13)	Benitez (42)	Olympic Stadium	5,314	78–74
153	September 27	@ Expos	12–6	White (4–5)	Strickland (2–6)	—	Olympic Stadium	6,968	79–74
154	September 28	@ Braves	3–5	Glavine (15–7)	Trachsel (10–13)	Smoltz (10)	Turner Field	43,664	79–75
155	September 29	@ Braves	5–8	Perez (7–8)	Benitez (6–4)	—	Turner Field	46,180	79–76
156	September 30	@ Braves	9–6	Appier (10–10)	Millwood (6–7)	Benitez (43)	Turner Field	42,667	80–76

October: (2–4) Home: 2–4; Away: 0–0

#	Date	Opponent	Score	Win	Loss	Save	Location	Attendance	Record
157	October 1	Pirates	1–5	Anderson (9–17)	Rusch (8–11)	Sauerbeck (2)	Shea Stadium	6,315	80–77
158	October 2	Pirates	1–10	Arroyo (5–7)	Chen (7–7)	—	Shea Stadium	8,058	80–78
159	October 3	Pirates	3–0	Trachsel (11–13)	Richie (11–15)	—	Shea Stadium	6,627	81–78
160	October 5	Expos	6–8	Thurman (9–11)	Leiter (11–11)	Strickland (9)	Shea Stadium	10,281	81–79
161	October 6	Expos	4–0	Appier (11–10)	Pavano (1–6)	—	Shea Stadium	15,025	82–79
162	October 7	Expos	0–5	Reames (4–8)	Rusch (8–12)	—	Shea Stadium	15,540	82–80

== Roster ==
2001 New York Mets
Roster
Pitchers: 17 Kevin Appier; 49 Armando Benítez; 32 Bruce Chen; 27 Dennis Cook; 27 Mark Corey; 45 John Franco; 39 Dicky Gonzalez; 32 Brett Hinchliffe; 22 Al Leiter; 34 Tom Martin; 40 C. J. Nitkowski; 35 Rick Reed; 38 Jerrod Riggan; 36 Grant Roberts; 23 Brian Rose; 48 Glendon Rusch; 29 Steve Trachsel; 43 Pete Walker; 33 Donne Wall; 99 Turk Wendell; 51 Rick White	Catchers: 26 Jason Phillips; 31 Mike Piazza; 7 Todd Pratt; 3 Vance Wilson; Infielders: 13 Edgardo Alfonzo; 19 Lenny Harris; 20 Mark Johnson; 10 Rey Ordóñez; 8 Desi Relaford; 30 Jorge Toca; 11 Jorge Velandia; 4 Robin Ventura; 9 Todd Zeile	Outfielders: 50 Benny Agbayani; 56 Darren Bragg; 25 Alex Escobar; 18 Darryl Hamilton; 23 Matt Lawton; 47 Joe McEwing; 44 Jay Payton; 6 Timo Pérez; 5 Tsuyoshi Shinjo; Other batters: 7 Gary Bennett	Manager: 2 Bobby Valentine; Coaches: 53 Dave Engle (hitting); 55 Bobby Floyd (bench); 54 Charlie Hough (pitching); 52 Randy Niemann (bullpen); 12 John Stearns (third base); 1 Mookie Wilson (first base)

== Player stats ==
= Indicates team leader

=== Batting ===
==== Starters by position ====
Note: Pos = Position;G = Games played; AB = At bats; H = Hits; Avg. = Batting average; HR = Home runs; RBI = Runs batted in

Pos	Player	G	AB	H	Avg.	HR	RBI
C	Mike Piazza	141	503	151	.300	36	94
1B	Todd Zeile	151	531	141	.266	10	62
2B	Edgardo Alfonzo	124	457	111	.243	17	49
SS	Rey Ordóñez	149	461	114	.247	3	44
3B	Robin Ventura	142	456	108	.237	21	61
LF	Benny Agbayani	91	296	82	.277	6	27
CF	Jay Payton	104	361	92	.255	8	34
RF	Timo Pérez	85	239	59	.247	5	22

==== Other batters ====
Note: G = Games played; AB = At bats; H = Hits; Avg. = Batting average; HR = Home runs; RBI = Runs batted in

Player	G	AB	H	Avg.	HR	RBI
Tsuyoshi Shinjo	123	400	107	.268	10	56
Desi Relaford	120	301	91	.302	8	36
Joe McEwing	116	283	80	.283	8	30
Matt Lawton	48	183	45	.246	3	13
Lenny Harris	110	135	30	.222	0	9
Darryl Hamilton	52	126	27	.214	1	5
Mark Johnson	71	118	30	.254	6	23
Todd Pratt	45	80	13	.163	2	4
Darren Bragg	18	57	15	.263	0	5
Vance Wilson	32	57	17	.298	0	6
Alex Escobar	18	50	10	.200	3	8
Jorge Toca	13	17	3	.176	0	1
Jorge Velandia	9	9	0	.000	0	0
Jason Phillips	6	7	1	.143	0	0
Gary Bennett	1	1	1	1.000	0	0

=== Pitching ===
==== Starting pitchers ====
Note: G = Games pitched; IP = Innings pitched; W = Wins; L = Losses; ERA = Earned run average; SO = Strikeouts

Player	G	IP	W	L	ERA	SO
Kevin Appier	33	206.2	11	10	3.57	172
Al Leiter	29	187.1	11	11	3.31	142
Glendon Rusch	33	179.0	8	12	4.63	156
Steve Trachsel	28	173.2	11	13	4.46	144
Rick Reed	20	134.2	8	6	3.48	99
Bruce Chen	11	59.2	3	2	4.68	47
Brett Hinchliffe	1	2.0	0	1	36.00	2

==== Other pitchers ====
Note: G = Games pitched; IP = Innings pitched; W = Wins; L = Losses; ERA = Earned run average; SO = Strikeouts

Player	G	IP	W	L	ERA	SO
Dicky Gonzalez	16	59.0	3	2	4.88	31

==== Relief pitchers ====
Note: G = Games pitched; W = Wins; L = Losses; SV = Saves; ERA = Earned run average; SO = Strikeouts

Player	G	W	L	SV	ERA	SO
Armando Benítez	73	6	4	43	3.77	93
John Franco	58	6	2	2	4.05	50
Rick White	55	4	5	2	3.88	51
Turk Wendell	49	4	3	1	3.51	41
Dennis Cook	43	1	1	0	4.25	34
Jerrod Riggan	35	3	3	0	3.40	41
Donne Wall	32	0	4	0	4.85	31
Grant Roberts	16	1	0	0	3.81	29
Tom Martin	14	1	0	0	10.06	12
C.J. Nitkowski	5	1	0	0	0.00	4
Brian Rose	3	0	1	0	4.15	4
Pete Walker	2	0	0	0	2.70	4
Mark Corey	2	0	0	0	16.20	3
Desi Relaford	1	0	0	0	0.00	1

== Awards and honors ==
- John Franco, Lou Gehrig Award

2001 MLB All Star Game

- Mike Piazza, catcher
- Rick Reed, reserve pitcher

== Farm system ==
Level	Team	League	Manager
AAA	Norfolk Tides	International League	John Gibbons
AA	Binghamton Mets	Eastern League	Howie Freiling
A	St. Lucie Mets	Florida State League	Tony Tijerina
A	Capital City Bombers	South Atlantic League	Ken Oberkfell
A-Short Season	Brooklyn Cyclones	New York–Penn League	Edgar Alfonzo
Rookie	Kingsport Mets	Appalachian League	Joey Cora

LEAGUE CO-CHAMPIONS: Brooklyn
