= Hiram Bocachica =

Puerto Rican baseball player and coach (born 1976)

- Outfielder / Coach
- Born: March 4, 1976 (age 50); Ponce, Puerto Rico
- Batted: Right Threw: Right

Professional debut
- MLB: September 13, 2000, for the Los Angeles Dodgers
- NPB: March 20, 2008, for the Saitama Seibu Lions

Last appearance
- MLB: July 17, 2007, for the San Diego Padres
- NPB: September 6, 2009, for the Saitama Seibu Lions

MLB statistics
- Batting average: .215
- Home runs: 15
- Runs batted in: 37

NPB statistics
- Batting average: .251
- Home runs: 20
- Runs batted in: 47
- Stats at Baseball Reference

Teams
- Los Angeles Dodgers (2000–2002); Detroit Tigers (2002–2003); Seattle Mariners (2004); Oakland Athletics (2005–2007); San Diego Padres (2007); Saitama Seibu Lions (2008–2009)

Hiram Gabriel Bocachica Colón (born March 4, 1976) is a Puerto Rican former professional baseball outfielder. He played in Major League Baseball (MLB) for five teams from 2000 to 2007, primarily for the Los Angeles Dodgers, with whom he made his MLB debut. He then played two seasons for the Saitama Seibu Lions of Nippon Professional Baseball (NPB). He has been a coach and manager for several minor league teams in the U.S., Mexico, and Caribbean leagues.

== Playing career ==
=== Major League Baseball ===
Bocachica was drafted by the Montreal Expos in the first round (21st overall) of the 1994 Major League Baseball draft. On July 31, 1998, the Expos included Bocachica as a prospect in a trade that sent Carlos Pérez and Mark Grudzielanek to the Los Angeles Dodgers for prospects Ted Lilly, Wilton Guerrero, Peter Bergeron, and Jon Tucker. Bocachica was a September call-up in 2000 for the Dodgers.

Los Angeles traded him on July 25, 2002 to the Detroit Tigers for Tom Farmer and a player to be named later, later identified as Jason Frasor. He reached free agency after the 2003 season, then played one season with the Seattle Mariners, where he set career highs with 5 stolen bases and 12 walks.

Bocachica signed with the Oakland Athletics. He hit .444 in spring training in 2005 before suffering a broken wrist after Matt Wise hit him with a pitch in late March, sidelining him until late August. Bocachica was called up to the A's in September, playing in 9 games. He began the 2006 season on the injured list again with a broken right wrist, later appearing in 8 MLB games. He was claimed off waivers by the San Diego Padres on May 31, 2007. He played in 33 games in his final MLB season, 27 of them with San Diego. He became a free agent after the season.

=== Nippon Professional Baseball ===
Bocachica signed with the Saitama Seibu Lions on December 3, 2007. Despite playing only 78 games during the 2008 season, he hit 20 home runs, including one in Game 7 of the Japan Series, which the team won. He agreed to return to the Lions in 2009, batting .215 with 13 home runs in 75 games.

=== Mexican League and Atlantic League ===
On April 12, 2010, Bocachica, along with fellow MLB alums Brian Barton and Tike Redman, signed with the Bridgeport Bluefish for the 2010 season. However, starting in April he played for Diablos Rojos del México and Broncos de Reynosa of the Mexican League. He later returned to Bridgeport after 43 games in Mexico.

Bocachica played for two Mexican League teams, Leones de Yucatán and Petroleros de Minatitlán, in 2011.

== International career ==
Bocachica played for Puerto Rico in the 2009 World Baseball Classic. In three games, he batted 1-for-5 with a walk and two runs scored.

== Coaching career ==
After retiring as a player, Bocachica became a sports agent. In 2016, he began working with the MLB development program in Puerto Rico. The following year, he was the hitting and third base coach for the Cangrejeros de Santurce in the Puerto Rican winter league.

In 2018, Bocachica was a traveling instructor for the Oakland Athletics. In 2019, he was the manager of the Arizona A's Gold team in the Rookie-level Arizona League.

Bocachica coached the 2021 Hickory Crawdads, a High-A Texas Rangers affiliate. In November 2022, he was named the manager of the Azucareros de Yabucoa of the Puerto Rican "Doble A" spring and summer league, but he was removed in April 2023. He was the hitting coach of the High-A Tri-City Dust Devils in 2024.

In December 2024, Bocachica was named the bench coach for the Leones de Yucatán of the Mexican League. He was replaced in late June by Wilfredo Romero. In May 2025, Bocachica was named the first base coach of Leones del Escogido in the Dominican winter league.

In March 2026, he joined Fernando Tatís's staff as bench coach for the Algodoneros de Unión Laguna of the Mexican League. On June 27, 2026, Bocachica, along with Tatís and assistant pitching coach Yunesky Maya, was dismissed following a 26–34 start that left the team in seventh place in the North Zone.

== Personal life ==
Bocachica is married and has three children. He resides in Bayamón, Puerto Rico. His son, Hiram Bocachica Jr., plays college baseball for the Rice Owls. Bocachica Jr. also played for the Puerto Rican national under-18 team.

== See also ==
- List of Major League Baseball players from Puerto Rico
