= Wilton Guerrero =

Dominican baseball player

- Second baseman / Outfielder
- Born: October 24, 1974 (age 52); Don Gregorio, Dominican Republic
- Batted: Switch Threw: Right

MLB debut
- September 3, 1996, for the Los Angeles Dodgers

Last MLB appearance
- October 1, 2004, for the Kansas City Royals

MLB statistics
- Batting average: .282
- Home runs: 11
- Runs batted in: 127
- Stats at Baseball Reference

Teams
- Los Angeles Dodgers (1996–1998); Montreal Expos (1998–2000); Cincinnati Reds (2001–2002); Montreal Expos (2002); Kansas City Royals (2004)

Wilton Álvaro Guerrero (born October 24, 1974) is a Dominican former professional baseball second baseman. He played for the Los Angeles Dodgers (1996–1998), Montreal Expos (1998–2000, 2002), Cincinnati Reds (2001–2002), and Kansas City Royals (2004) of Major League Baseball. He is the older brother of Baseball Hall of Famer Vladimir Guerrero, cousin of Cristian Guerrero, and uncle of Vladimir Guerrero Jr..

According to MLB official records, Wilton Guerrero was born on October 24, 1974. However, this date is believed to be incorrect given the fact that his brother Vladimir was born less than four months later on February 9, 1975. Vladimir's birth date was originally listed as February 9, 1976, but he was revealed to be a year older in 2009. At this time, Wilton no longer played in the Major Leagues, making it likely that nobody noticed or cared about correcting Wilton's birth date.

He was a utility player and played strong defense at any position he played. Although he had the ability to hit for average, he had limited power. A switch hitter, most of his power came while batting right handed. He hit only 3 of his 11 career home runs while batting left handed despite many more career at-bats from that side.

== Career ==
=== Los Angeles Dodgers (1996–1998) ===
On October 8, 1991, Guerrero was signed out of the Dominican Republic by the Los Angeles Dodgers.

After several seasons in the minor leagues, punctuated by hitting a combined .346 at Double A and Triple-A in 1995, and .344 in Triple-A in 1996, Guerrero was called up to the Dodgers at 21 years of age in the 1996 season. He made his major league debut on September 3, 1996, against the New York Mets. He recorded his first hit on Opening Day 1997 (April 1) against the Philadelphia Phillies, with a first inning single off Curt Schilling. His first home run came two weeks later, on April 16, against the Mets' Rick Reed.

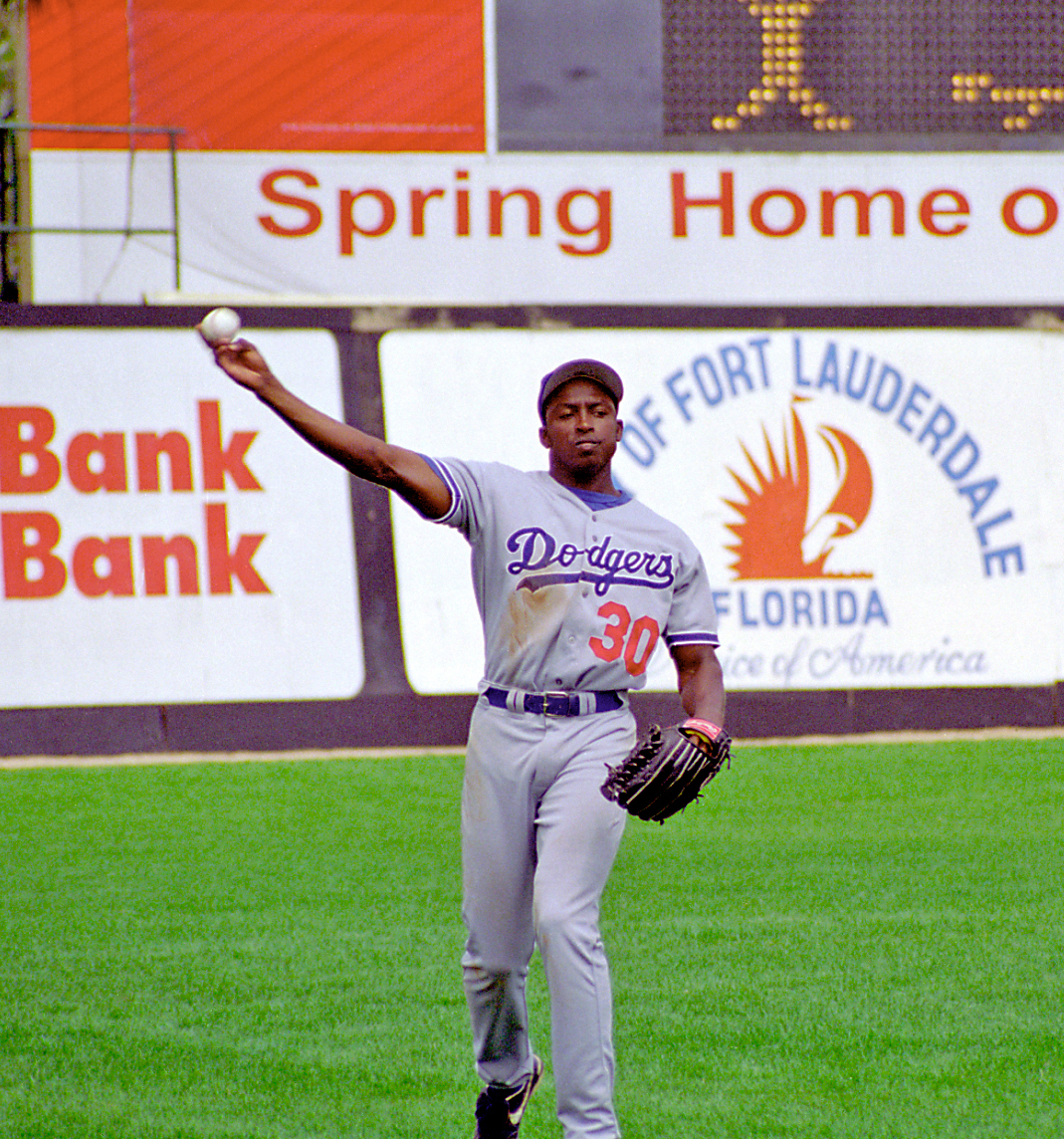
Wilton Guerrero of the Los Angeles Dodgers during a 1998 spring training game in Fort Lauderdale, Fla.

However, on June 1, 1997, the Dodgers rookie led off against the St. Louis Cardinals by breaking his bat on a grounder to second. Rather than try to run it out, Guerrero scrambled to pick up the pieces of his shattered bat, making the umpires suspicious. Plate umpire Steve Rippley noticed cork in one of the shattered pieces, and showed it to crew chief and third-base umpire Bruce Froemming, who immediately ejected Guerrero. He was suspended eight games and fined $1,000. Additionally, his tenure in Los Angeles was plagued by numerous mental mistakes that kept him from becoming a regular starter. Despite these issues, however, Guerrero proved a solid contact hitter with an ability to hit for average, posting a .291 average in 1997. However, he did not hit for power, with only four home runs, and despite being known as a speedy runner, he only stole six bases in 1997 while being caught five times.

=== Montreal Expos (1998–2000) ===
Guerrero began the 1998 season with the Dodgers, but was traded at the deadline to the Montreal Expos with minor league first baseman Jonny Tucker, outfield prospect Peter Bergeron, and pitching prospect Ted Lilly for outfield prospect Hiram Bocachica, second baseman Mark Grudzielanek, and starting pitcher Carlos Perez. The deal also united Guerrero with his younger brother Vladimir in Montreal.

Despite having fallen out of favor in Los Angeles, Guerrero again became a starting second baseman in Montreal. He played in all 52 of the Expos' final games during 1998, and for the season his combined totals were a .284 batting average, two home runs, and 27 RBI. He also stole eight bases, and was only thrown out twice. On August 15, 1998, he hit his first home run as an Expo in the 8th inning of a game against the Cincinnati Reds. One inning later, his brother homered, making the brothers the 12th pair of siblings to homer in the same game, and only the sixth to do so as teammates.

In 1999, Guerrero hit .292, again with two home runs, and 31 RBI in 132 games. He stole seven bases and was caught six times. On October 2, he launched his first grand slam in the second inning of a 13–3 rout of the Phillies. Since Vladimir had homered earlier in the game, it was the second time the brothers had homered in the same game.

During the 2000 season, Guerrero began seeing more time in the outfield due to the emergence of Jose Vidro. His batting average fell to .267, but he once again hit 2 home runs, this time driving in 23 runs. He stole 8 bases and was caught once. His two home runs, the first May 18 against the Arizona Diamondbacks, and the second September 18 against the Florida Marlins, came in games where Vladimir had already homered, the third and fourth times the brothers had both homered in the same game. The four games was a new Major League record at the time, surpassing the three games in which Lloyd and Paul Waner, and Tommie and Hank Aaron had achieved the feat. In 2001, Jeremy and Jason Giambi tied the Guerreros by homering in their fourth game together, and the record has since been surpassed by Melvin Upton Jr. and Justin Upton who both homered in a 5th game together in 2014. The Uptons hold the current record at 6 games.

=== Later years (2001–2005) ===
Following the 2000 season, Guerrero elected to sign as a free agent with the Cincinnati Reds. In Cincinnati, Guerrero was used exclusively as a pinch hitter before being sent down to Triple-A Louisville. After being called back up in July, Guerrero steadily boosted his batting average to a career best .338 in 60 games. He added a home run, eight RBI, and five steals (caught twice). He finished the year playing mostly shortstop in the wake of an injury to Barry Larkin.

In 2002, he returned to a pinch hitting and backup role once more with the Reds. After hitting just .244, Guerrero was part of a massive three team deal that landed him back with the Expos alongside his brother Vladimir. In the deal, the Florida Marlins received Juan Encarnación, Graeme Lloyd, Mike Mordecai, Carl Pavano, Justin Wayne, Ryan Snare, minor leaguer Don Levinski, and a player to be named later. The Reds received Ryan Dempster. The Expos received Guerrero, Cliff Floyd, Claudio Vargas, and cash.

Guerrero remained a backup and pinch hitter following the trade, and had his worst offensive season to date, batting only a combined .221 for the season with five RBI (no home runs), though he did steal seven bases (caught only once). The Expos released Guerrero following the 2002 season. A free agent once again, he opted to sign once more with the Reds. Guerrero did not make the Reds out of spring training, however, and spent the entire 2003 season with Triple-A Louisville.

A free agent again for 2004, Guerrero signed with the Kansas City Royals. He spent most of 2004 with the Triple-A Omaha Royals, but did appear in 24 games with the Major League club, mostly as a backup, batting .219 with 1 RBI and a stolen base.

He was signed by the St. Louis Cardinals to a minor league contract in January 2005 with an invitation to spring training, but was let go at the end of spring training. However, the Cardinals signed Guerrero on April 26 to add depth. He started the season with the Memphis Redbirds, the Cardinals' Triple-A affiliate. The Cardinals traded his contract to the Chicago White Sox in June, but after two more months with the White Sox' top affiliate, the Charlotte Knights, he was released in August. He then played several years in the Dominican Republic.

As of the 2009 season, Guerrero was serving as an international scout in the Dominican Republic for the Dodgers.

== Playing style ==
Guerrero as a hitter was known as a slap-hitter who frequently choked up on the bat to try and hit singles rather than try to hit home runs. He was also a free swinger, never walking more than 19 times in a single season. This contributed to a low on-base percentage throughout his career. However, because he did hit for a high batting average, Guerrero was valuable as a pinch hitter since he could come through in a clutch situation with a necessary hit. A switch hitter, Guerrero hit most of his home runs batting right-handed (8 of 11), however, throughout his MLB career, he hit for a higher batting average while batting left-handed (.286 vs .273 right-handed).

Guerrero's utility also made him valuable in that he could play multiple positions. Despite being primarily a second baseman throughout his career, Guerrero was used at times as a left fielder, center fielder, right fielder, third baseman, shortstop, and first baseman. The only positions he never played at the Major League level were catcher and pitcher.

== Personal life ==
Guerrero is the older brother of Vladimir Guerrero Sr. and the uncle of Vladimir Guerrero Jr. and Gabriel Guerrero.

Guerrero is a devout Christian who attends church every morning.

== See also ==
- List of Major League Baseball players from the Dominican Republic
