= Troy Mattes =

American baseball player

- Pitcher
- Born: August 26, 1975 (age 49); Champaign, Illinois
- Batted: Right Threw: Right

MLB debut
- June 19, 2001, for the Montreal Expos

Last MLB appearance
- July 27, 2001, for the Montreal Expos

MLB statistics
- Win–loss record: 3–3
- Earned run average: 6.00
- Strikeouts: 26
- Stats at Baseball Reference

Teams
- Montreal Expos (2001)

Troy Walter Mattes (born August 26, 1975) is a former Major League Baseball player. A pitcher, Mattes played for the Montreal Expos in 2001. Mattes spent six years (2007-2012) coaching in the Baltimore Orioles organization. He is currently the Pitching Coordinator at Inspiration Academy in Bradenton, FL.

Mattes played baseball and attended Riverview High School.

Mattes spent the past six years as a pitching coach with the Baltimore Orioles. After a 19-year playing-and-coaching career, Mattes retired from major league baseball at the end of the 2012 season to be able to stay close to home and spend more time with his wife, Kera, and daughters Ella and Eva.
