= Carlos Pérez (pitcher) =

Dominican baseball player (born 1971)

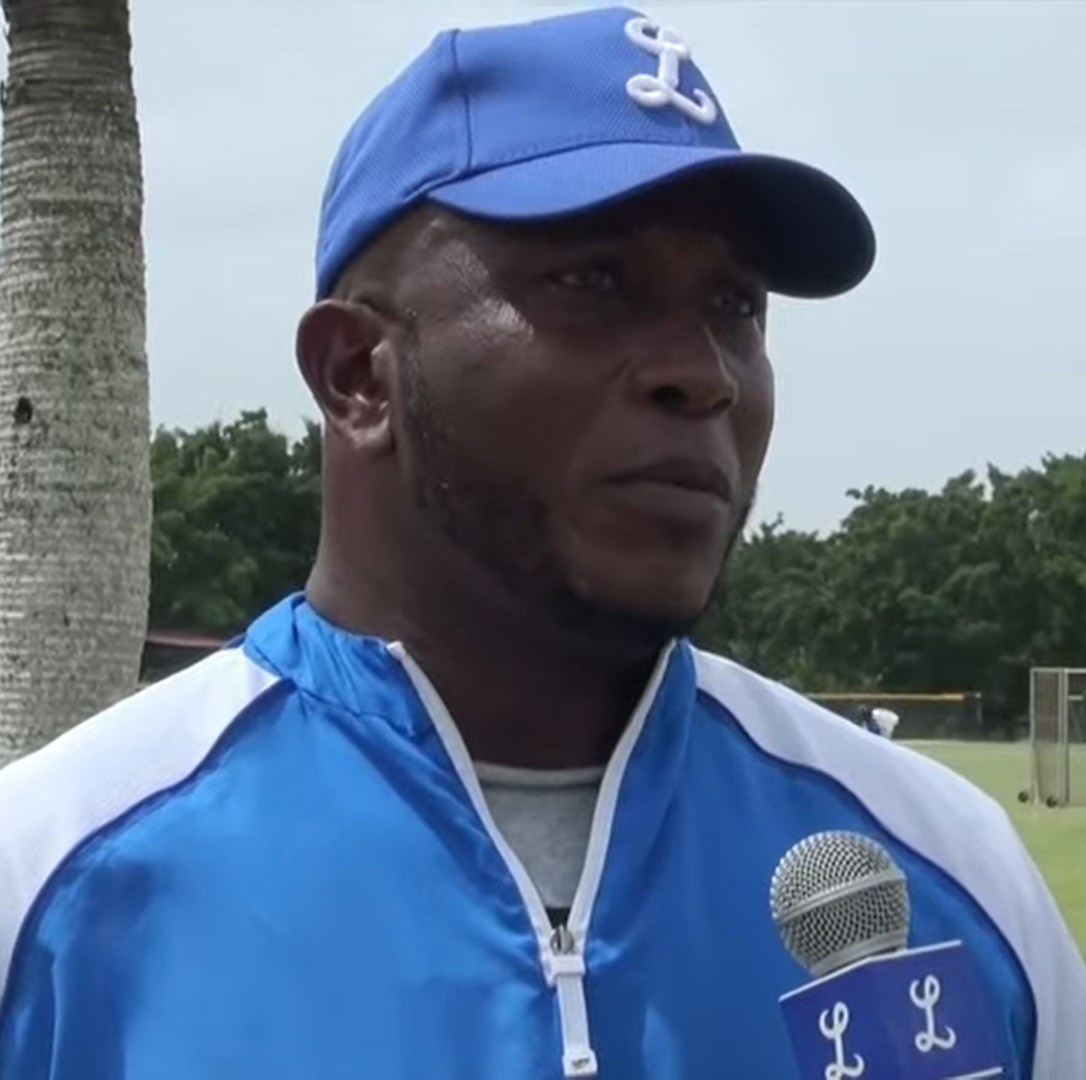
- Pérez as a coach with Tigres del Licey in 2016
- Pitcher
- Born: April 14, 1971 (age 54); Nigua, Dominican Republic
- Batted: Left Threw: Left

MLB debut
- April 27, 1995, for the Montreal Expos

Last MLB appearance
- September 5, 2000, for the Los Angeles Dodgers

MLB statistics
- Win–loss record: 40–53
- Earned run average: 4.44
- Strikeouts: 448
- Stats at Baseball Reference

Teams
- Montreal Expos (1995, 1997–1998); Los Angeles Dodgers (1998–2000)

Career highlights and awards
- All-Star (1995)

Carlos Gross Pérez (born April 14, 1971) is a Dominican former pitcher in Major League Baseball and the brother of former major league players Melido Pérez and Pascual Pérez.

== Career ==
Pérez signed with the Montreal Expos as an amateur free agent in 1988. After being an All-Star pitcher in his debut season in 1995, Pérez's career looked extremely promising. However, he soon suffered an untimely and devastating injury which forced him to miss the entire 1996 season. After rehabilitation, he re-joined the Expos in 1997 but still displayed steady showings of his All-Star form, earning a career-high 12 wins and leading the majors with five shutouts. After several productive months into the 1998 season, Pérez was traded to the Los Angeles Dodgers on July 31 along with Hiram Bocachica and Mark Grudzielanek for Peter Bergeron, Wilton Guerrero, Ted Lilly, and Jonathan Tucker.

By the time he became a Dodger, his potential for being a dominant left-handed major league pitcher was quickly slipping away. Frustration grew and Pérez had his two worst seasons in 1999 (2-10 in only 16 starts) and 2000, and he was relegated to the bullpen (after an entire career as a starter). On June 16, 1999, Pérez had an outburst during a game against the Pittsburgh Pirates at Dodger Stadium. After consecutively walking Abraham Nunez, Francisco Córdova and Mike Benjamin to load the bases in the fourth inning, he was removed from the game by Dodger Manager Davey Johnson in favor of Jamie Arnold. Upon returning to the dugout, Pérez proceeded to destroy a water cooler with a baseball bat. (The Dodgers won the game, 6-5.)

Pérez was a highly animated player, especially when he was on the mound. Beginning in his rookie year, after every strikeout (and sometimes even after individual strikes), he made spastic movements, usually flailing an arm into the air while crouching very low to the ground and hopping in a semicircle (in the case of a strikeout, Pérez would react in unity with the umpire who was signaling the strikeout motion). Sometimes batters took offense to it while others realized or knew that it was just part of his routine.

Perez has gone on to play in his native Dominican Republic, to play winter ball, including the 2009 Caribbean Series as well as the 2009 World Baseball Classic.

Pérez hit four home runs, two triples, and eight doubles in his 250 official MLB at-bats.

== Personal life ==
In 1995, Pérez was arrested and charged with rape and sodomy in Atlanta. In 2000, Fulton County prosecutors said they would not be proceeding with the charges at the alleged victim's request. The alleged victim, however, said that she never asked for the charges to be dropped.

In 1999, Pérez was charged with rape in two separate incidents in Vero Beach, Florida. The accuser in one case consented to the charges being withdrawn and the prosecution declined to pursue the charges in the other case due to lack of evidence.

In July 2000, Pérez was arrested for allegedly assaulting, threatening and causing injury to a flight attendant on a team flight. The charges were eventually dismissed, although the Dodgers released Pérez in early May 2001. The flight attendant's attorney alleged that she needed multiple neck surgeries as a result of the assault and was unable to return to work. Her lawsuit against the Dodgers and Pérez was settled in 2003 under confidential terms.

At a civil trial at which he failed to appear in August 2005, Pérez was found liable for rape, stemming from one of the 1999 Vero Beach incidents. He was ordered to pay $15 million in damages.
