= Mark Grudzielanek =

American baseball player and coach (born 1970)

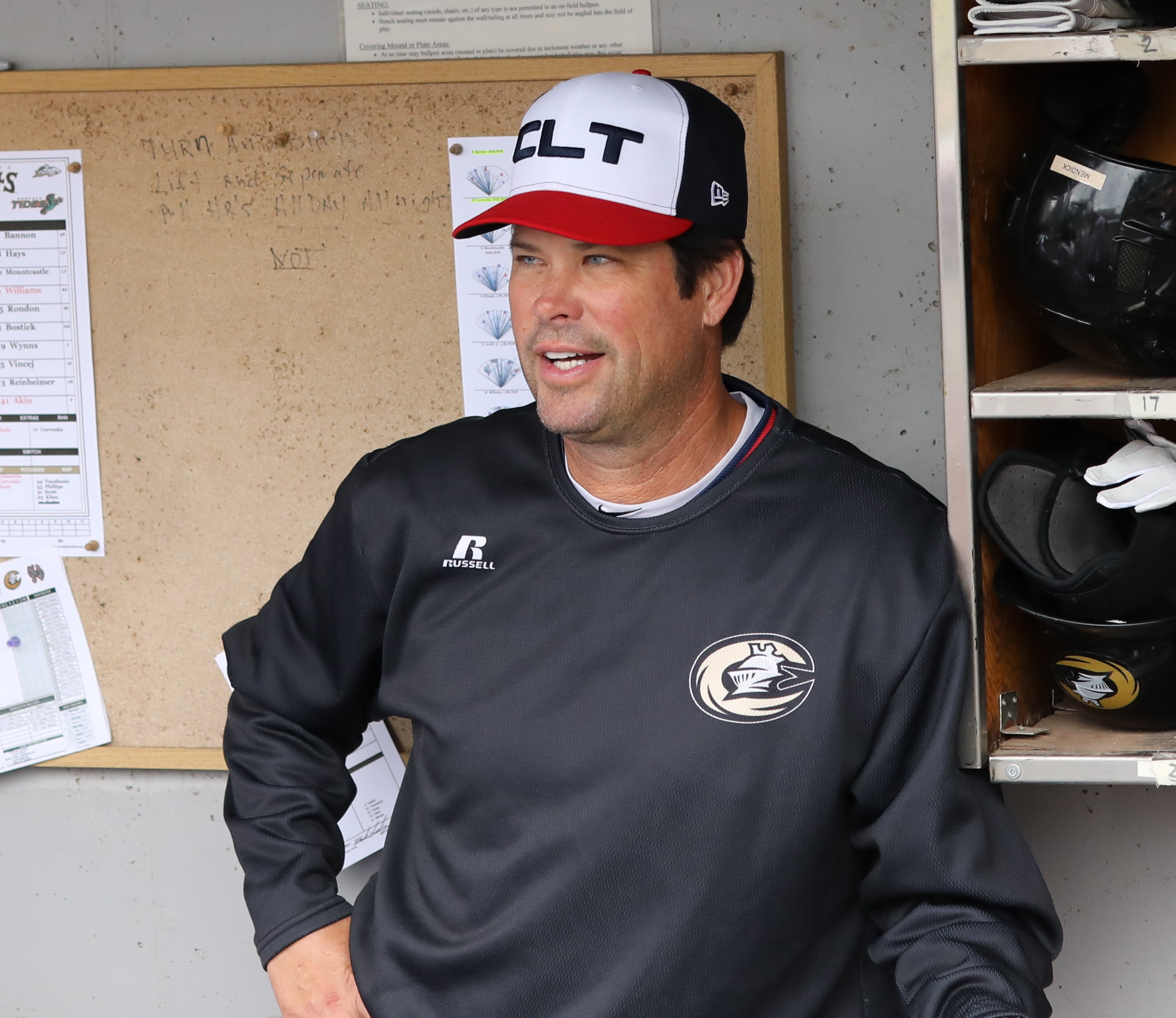
- Grudzielanek with the Charlotte Knights in 2019.
- Second baseman / Shortstop
- Born: June 30, 1970 (age 56); Milwaukee, Wisconsin, U.S.
- Batted: Right Threw: Right

MLB debut
- April 28, 1995, for the Montreal Expos

Last MLB appearance
- June 6, 2010, for the Cleveland Indians

MLB statistics
- Batting average: .289
- Hits: 2,040
- Home runs: 90
- Runs batted in: 640
- Stats at Baseball Reference

Teams
- Montreal Expos (1995–1998); Los Angeles Dodgers (1998–2002); Chicago Cubs (2003–2004); St. Louis Cardinals (2005); Kansas City Royals (2006–2008); Cleveland Indians (2010)

Career highlights and awards
- All-Star (1996); Gold Glove Award (2006)

Mark James Grudzielanek (/ˌɡrʌdzɪˈlɑːnɪk/; born June 30, 1970) is an American former Major League Baseball second baseman and shortstop. Grudzielanek played for six different teams during his 15-season career. He batted and threw right-handed. He was most recently the 2019 manager of the Charlotte Knights, the Triple-A affiliate of the Chicago White Sox.

== Early years ==
Grudzielanek attended J. M. Hanks High School in El Paso, Texas, and was a letterman and an All-State selection in basketball and baseball. His mother is of Galician descent and his father is of Polish descent.

== Professional career ==
=== Montreal Expos ===
Grudzielanek was originally drafted by the New York Mets in the 17th round of the 1989 MLB draft but did not sign. He was then drafted in the 11th round of the 1991 MLB draft by the Montreal Expos and signed on June 11, 1991.

In 1994, with the Double-A Harrisburg Senators he hit .322 in 122 games and was rewarded by being selected as a Double-A All-Star, Eastern League Most Valuable Player, and Expos Minor league player of the year.

He made his Major League debut on April 28, 1995, with the Expos against the Chicago Cubs, striking out as a pinch hitter against Mike Walker. He made his first start (at second base) the following day but did not record his first major league hit (a double) until May 4 against New York Mets relief pitcher Mike Remlinger. His first career home run came on May 16, 1995, against Kevin Jarvis of the Cincinnati Reds. He appeared in 78 games that season, hitting .245.

In 1996, Grudzielanek hit .306 in 153 games and was selected to appear in the 1996 Major League Baseball All-Star Game for his only appearance in the Mid-Summer Classic. In the All-Star game, he grounded out in his lone at-bat against Roberto Hernandez. In 1997, he led the majors with 54 doubles.

He hit .281 in 492 games for the Expos over four seasons.

=== Los Angeles Dodgers ===
Grudzielanek was traded by the Expos to the Los Angeles Dodgers (along with Hiram Bocachica and Carlos Perez) for Jonathan Tucker, Peter Bergeron, Wilton Guerrero, and Ted Lilly on July 31, 1998. Primarily a shortstop through this point in his career, the Dodgers moved him to second base in 2000 to make room for Alex Cora to play shortstop.

He spent five seasons with the Dodgers, playing in 605 games and hitting .284 with 38 home runs.

=== Chicago Cubs ===
On December 4, 2002, the Dodgers traded him (along with Eric Karros) to the Chicago Cubs for Chad Hermansen and Todd Hundley. He spent the next two seasons in Chicago, hitting .312 in 202 games.

=== St. Louis Cardinals ===
After leaving the Cubs as a free agent after the 2004 season, Grudzielanek signed with the St. Louis Cardinals on January 6, 2005. He appeared in 137 games with the Cardinals, hitting for a .294 average. From the April 27 game against the Milwaukee Brewers until July 1, 2022, he was the last Cardinals player to have hit for the cycle until Nolan Arenado achieved the feat on the latter date.

=== Kansas City Royals ===
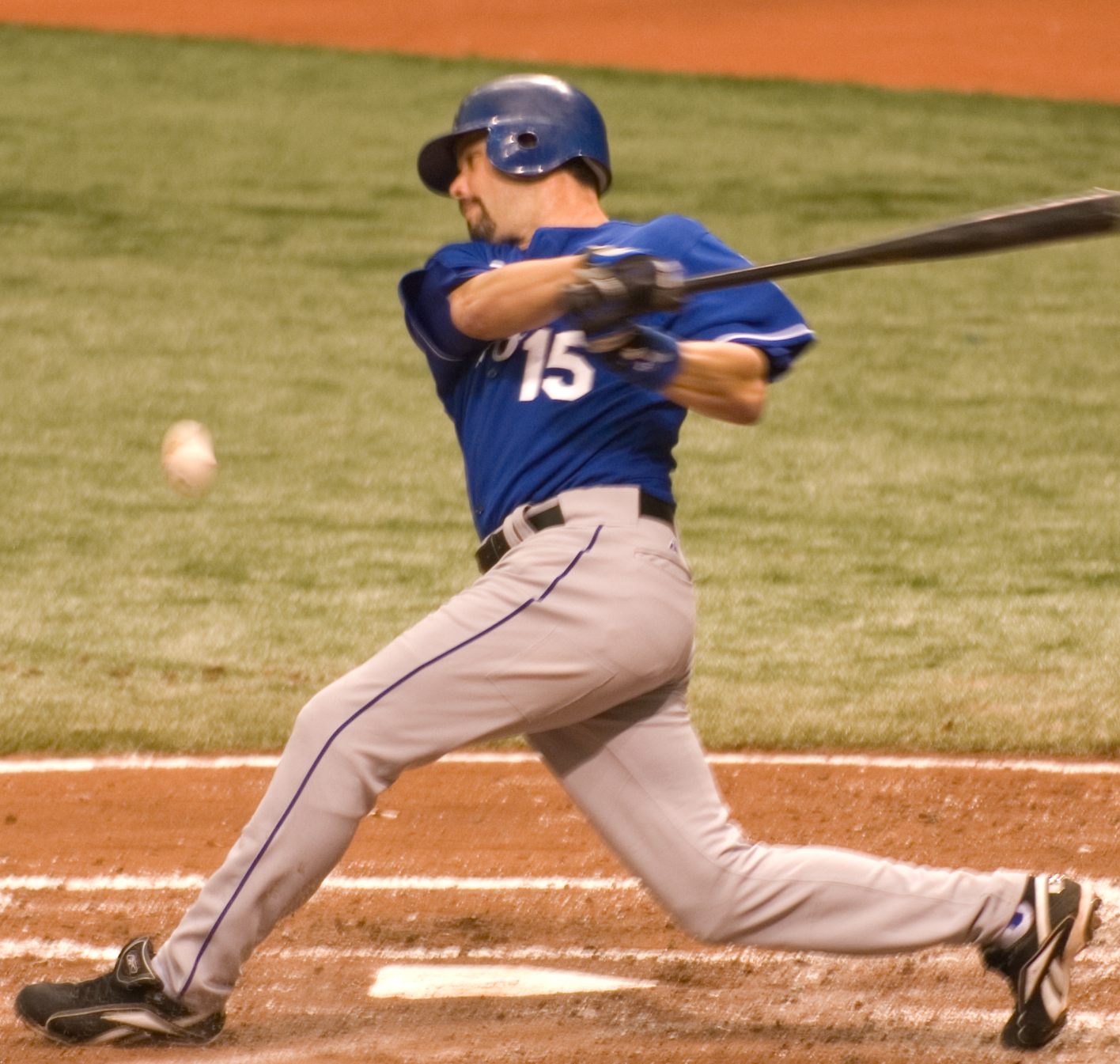
Grudzielanek with the Kansas City Royals in 2007

Grudzielanek signed a contract on December 16, 2005, to be the second baseman for the Kansas City Royals. He won the Gold Glove Award in 2006 for second basemen in the American League. He played with the Royals for three seasons, appearing in 336 games, with a .300 batting average.

=== Minnesota Twins ===
He became a free agent after the 2008 season but did not sign with a team until the Minnesota Twins offered him a minor league contract on July 19, 2009. After only 11 games (three with the Gulf Coast Twins and eight with the New Britain Rock Cats), he was released on August 10.

=== Cleveland Indians ===
On January 12, 2010, he signed a minor league contract with the Cleveland Indians with a spring training invite. He was added to the Major League roster on April 3. He appeared in 30 games for the Indians, hitting .273 but also spending several weeks on the disabled list. His 30 hits were all singles; this was the highest hit total without an extra-base hit in a single season since 1938. On June 8, Grudzielanek was designated for assignment by the Indians to make room on the roster for Anderson Hernandez; he was released shortly after. Grudzielanek retired from professional baseball on February 23, 2011.

=== Career statistics ===
In 1,802 games over 15 seasons, Grudzielanek posted a .289 batting average (2,040-for-7,052) with 946 runs, 391 doubles, 36 triples, 90 home runs, 640 RBI, 133 stolen bases, 364 bases on balls, .332 on-base percentage and .393 slugging percentage. He finished his career with a .977 fielding percentage playing at second base, shortstop and third base. In 21 postseason games, he hit .188 (16-for-85) with eight runs and five RBI.

== Coaching career ==
Grudzielanek was named the manager of the Arizona Diamondbacks' Class A affiliate Kane County Cougars prior to the 2015 season. Following the 2015 season, where the Cougars won the Midwest League Western division with a 48–22 record (.686 winning percentage), Grudzielanek was promoted to the Diamondbacks Player Development staff, with a title of Assistant Coordinator. He was the manager of the Charlotte Knights, the Triple-A affiliate of the Chicago White Sox, from 2017 to 2019. On June 20, 2019, he was one of four new inductees into the National Polish-American Sports Hall of Fame located in Troy, Michigan.

== See also ==
- List of Major League Baseball players with 2000 hits
- List of Major League Baseball annual doubles leaders
- List of Major League Baseball players to hit for the cycle

Achievements
Preceded by Brad Wilkerson	Hitting for the cycle April 27, 2005	Succeeded by Randy Winn
