= Ted Lilly =

American baseball player (born 1976)

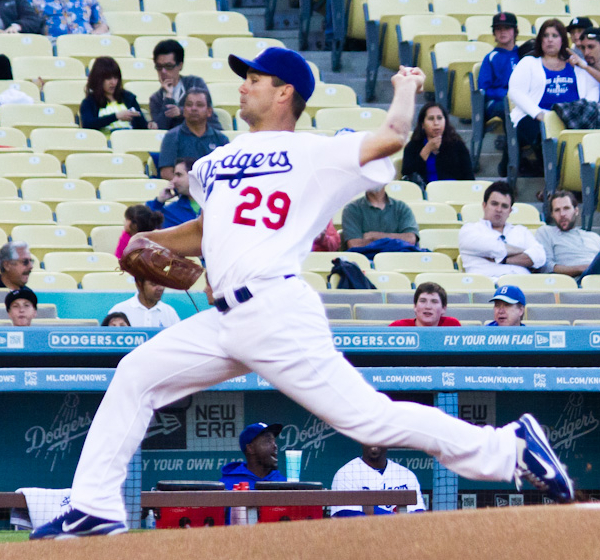
- Lilly with the Los Angeles Dodgers
- Pitcher
- Born: January 4, 1976 (age 50); Lomita, California, U.S.
- Batted: Left Threw: Left

MLB debut
- May 14, 1999, for the Montreal Expos

Last MLB appearance
- June 4, 2013, for the Los Angeles Dodgers

MLB statistics
- Win–loss record: 130–113
- Earned run average: 4.14
- Strikeouts: 1,681
- Stats at Baseball Reference

Teams
- Montreal Expos (1999); New York Yankees (2000–2002); Oakland Athletics (2002–2003); Toronto Blue Jays (2004–2006); Chicago Cubs (2007–2010); Los Angeles Dodgers (2010–2013)

Career highlights and awards
- 2× All-Star (2004, 2009)

Theodore Roosevelt Lilly III (born January 4, 1976) is an American former professional baseball pitcher. Lilly attended Yosemite High School in Oakhurst, California, and Fresno City College. He played in Major League Baseball (MLB) from 1999 to 2013 for the Montreal Expos, New York Yankees, Oakland Athletics, Toronto Blue Jays, Chicago Cubs and Los Angeles Dodgers. He was a two-time MLB All-Star.

== Professional career ==
=== Minor leagues ===
Lilly was drafted by the Los Angeles Dodgers in the 23rd round of the 1996 MLB draft. After two seasons in the Dodgers farm system, he was traded (along with Peter Bergeron, Wilton Guerrero and Jonathan Tucker) to the Montreal Expos for Hiram Bocachica, Mark Grudzielanek and Carlos Pérez.

=== Montreal Expos ===
Lilly made his MLB debut for the Expos on May 14, 1999, against the Pittsburgh Pirates, pitching one inning in relief. He made his first MLB start on September 19 against the Atlanta Braves. He pitched in nine games for the Expos, with three starts.

=== New York Yankees ===
Lilly was traded to the New York Yankees on March 17, 2000, along with Christian Parker, as a player to be named later in the 1999 trade that also sent Jake Westbrook to the Yankees in exchange for Hideki Irabu. On April 27, 2002, Lilly threw a one-hitter against the Seattle Mariners in a losing effort. Boston's Derek Lowe pitched a no-hitter on the same day.

=== Oakland Athletics ===
Lilly played for more than two years with the Yankees before being dealt to the Oakland Athletics in a three-team deal that included pitchers Jeff Weaver heading to New York and Jeremy Bonderman going to the Detroit Tigers. Lilly was in the starting rotation for Oakland, and pitched in the American League Division Series in both 2002 and 2003.

=== Toronto Blue Jays ===
Lilly was traded from the Athletics to the Toronto Blue Jays for Bobby Kielty. In April, he threw a two-hitter against the Twins in Minnesota. He made the American League All-Star team in 2004 as the Jays' lone representative that year.

The highlight of his career as a Blue Jay was a start on August 23, 2004, against the Boston Red Sox. He pitched a complete-game shutout and struck out 13 batters in a three-hit 3–0 victory.

Lilly was 15–13 with a 4.31 ERA and 160 strikeouts in 2006, exceeding his previous career-high for wins (12). He also equaled a career high for starts (32) and nearly matched his career highs in strikeouts and innings pitched. This season, he ranked first among the Jays' pitching staff in strikeouts and second only to Roy Halladay in wins (Halladay had a 16–5 record before a recurring elbow injury ended his season in late September).

On August 21, 2006, in a game against the Oakland Athletics, Lilly was surrendering an early 8–0 lead in the 3rd inning when manager John Gibbons took him out of the game. With the score 8-5 and runners on 1st and 3rd, Lilly refused to give him the ball. Eventually, he reluctantly left the mound and later feuded with Gibbons in the tunnel leading to the locker rooms. It was reported that Gibbons left the scene with a bloody nose, though Lilly maintained no punches were thrown.

Lilly filed for free agency at the end of the 2006 season, and alongside Barry Zito, Jason Schmidt and Jeff Suppan, was one of the most sought-after free agent pitchers, partially due to the thin market for starting pitching. On the morning of December 6, 2006, he informed the Blue Jays that he would not be returning to the club, thus rejecting a four-year, $40 million deal. He cited a "change in scenery" as his reasoning. Later on that day, Lilly agreed to an identical four-year, $40 million deal with the Chicago Cubs, officially ending his tenure with the Blue Jays.

=== Chicago Cubs ===
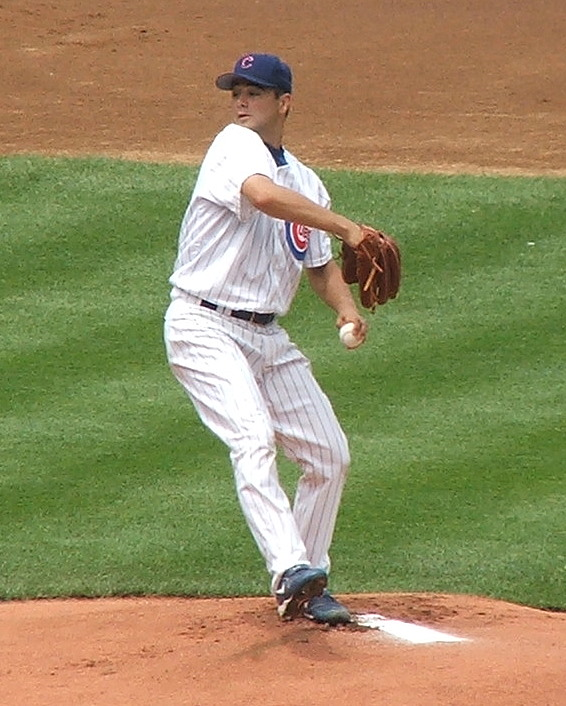
Lilly pitching for the Cubs in 2007.

In his first start for the Cubs, Lilly defeated the Cincinnati Reds in a strong outing, taking a no hitter into the fifth inning, and only yielding one earned run over seven innings. Lilly then was the starting pitcher for the Cubs home opening game at Wrigley Field on April 9, 2007. Lilly gave up three runs in six innings, but did not factor into the decision. Lilly pitched well in April, lasting at least six innings in each of his five starts while never giving up more than three runs in a game posting a 2.18 ERA.

Lilly was prominent in a contentious series in Atlanta between the Cubs and the Atlanta Braves. In game one of the series, Alfonso Soriano hit three home runs in his first three at-bats as part of a Cubs 9–1 victory. In the next game, Tim Hudson hit Soriano with a first-pitch fastball triggering home-plate umpire Tim Tschida to issue warnings to both teams. On the final game of the series, Lilly hit Édgar Rentería in the first inning, and was promptly thrown out of the ballgame by Jim Wolf. Lilly was not suspended for his actions in the game. In 2009, he was named to his second all-star game, as the Cubs lone representative. He underwent shoulder surgery in the off-season to clean up debris and labrum fraying.

On June 13, 2010, Lilly took a no-hitter into the 9th against the Chicago White Sox. In the ninth, he gave up a lead off single to Juan Pierre, then was lifted for relief pitcher Carlos Mármol, who got the save, getting out of a bases loaded jam, for a 1-0 Cub victory. This was the longest outing that Lilly held a team hitless. The no-hitter would have been the first pitched at Wrigley Field since Milt Pappas in 1972. He also threw a two-hitter against the Rockies in August.

=== 2009 World Baseball Classic ===
Lilly was the starting pitcher in two games for Team USA in the 2009 World Baseball Classic.

In the first game he faced Venezuela but was pulled after 36 pitches. Manager Davey Johnson wanted to get work for starter Jeremy Guthrie and as many relievers as possible. Lilly left with the United States trailing 1–0, thanks to the homer he served up to his former Cubs batterymate, Henry Blanco. His second start was against Puerto Rico, a game that Team USA would win with a David Wright two-run single in the bottom of the ninth. For his part Lilly gave up two home runs, the only two hits he gave up in his 3 1/3 innings.

=== Los Angeles Dodgers ===
On July 31, 2010, Lilly and Ryan Theriot were traded to the Los Angeles Dodgers for Blake DeWitt, Brett Wallach, and Kyle Smit. Lilly won his first five starts as a Dodger posting a 1.83 ERA. He finished his season with the Dodgers with a record of 7-4 and a 3.52 ERA in 12 starts, which included a complete game shutout on August 19 against the Colorado Rockies. On October 19, 2010, Lilly agreed to a 3-year, $33 million, contract with the Dodgers. After a disappointing first half of the season in 2011, where he had an ERA of 4.79, Lilly pitched much better in the second half, with a 2.94 mark, also allowing only 9 homers in the second half after allowing 19 the first half. His final record was 12–14 with a 3.97 ERA in 33 starts.

Lilly started the 2012 season with a 5–1 record and a 3.14 ERA in 8 starts. However, after struggling in his May 24 start, Lilly felt some pain in his shoulder and was placed on the disabled list. He made some rehab appearances with Class-A Rancho Cucamonga in July but suffered a setback and was shut down. He remained hopeful that he would return to the team and pitch out of the bullpen in September, however it was eventually decided that he would have surgery on his shoulder on September 21 and would not return to the mound that season.

Lilly returned for spring training in 2013 but lost time due to illness and rainouts so he was unable to build up arm strength. He started the season on the disabled list, and made several rehab appearances in the minors. After injuries to starters Zack Greinke and Chris Capuano, Lilly was activated off the disabled list and returned to the rotation on April 24. He made 2 starts and then returned to the DL on May 3 with a strained rib cage muscle. He returned again on May 20 and he made 3 more starts before injuring his neck when he was bumped into by Kyle Blanks of the San Diego Padres in a game on June 4, which led to him returning to the disabled list. After a few more rehab starts, Lilly claimed he was having trouble recovering after starts and that he wanted to work out of the bullpen after his return from the DL. However, the Dodgers instead designated him for assignment on July 25 and released him on August 2.

=== San Francisco Giants ===
On August 6, 2013, Just a few days after being released by the Dodgers, reports claimed Lilly was signed to a minor league contract by the San Francisco Giants. However, the Giants called off the deal after the two sides could not agree on a designated callup date.

=== Retirement ===
He had his nerve endings in his neck cauterized after the 2013 season in an attempt to stem the pain that had bothered him throughout the season and joined the Venezuela Winter League to try to show other MLB teams he could still play. However, persistent health problems led him to announce his retirement on November 27, 2013. The Cubs hired Lilly as a special assistant in March 2014.

Lilly was eligible to be elected into the Hall of Fame in 2019, but received less than 5% of the vote and became ineligible for the 2020 ballot.

== Pitching style ==
As a finesse pitcher, Lilly relied more on above-average control and movement rather than elite velocity. He also demonstrated the ability to throw a variety of pitches: a changeup, two fastballs—a four-seamer and a two-seamer in the 86-90 mph range, as well as two breaking balls, a slider and a curveball. His slider was more frequently used against left-handed batters and his other off-speed pitches more against right-handed batters. His pitching motion was a straight-over-the-top delivery.

== Personal life ==
Lilly's wife, Natasha (Tasha), is a veterinarian. They are active advocates for animal humane societies. Their son, Theodore Roosevelt Lilly IV, was born on March 14, 2010.

In January 2015, Lilly was charged with three counts of vehicle insurance fraud. He accepted a plea bargain to pay a $2,500 fine, be on informal probation for two years, and perform 250 hours of community service.
