= Peter Bergeron =

American baseball player (born 1977)

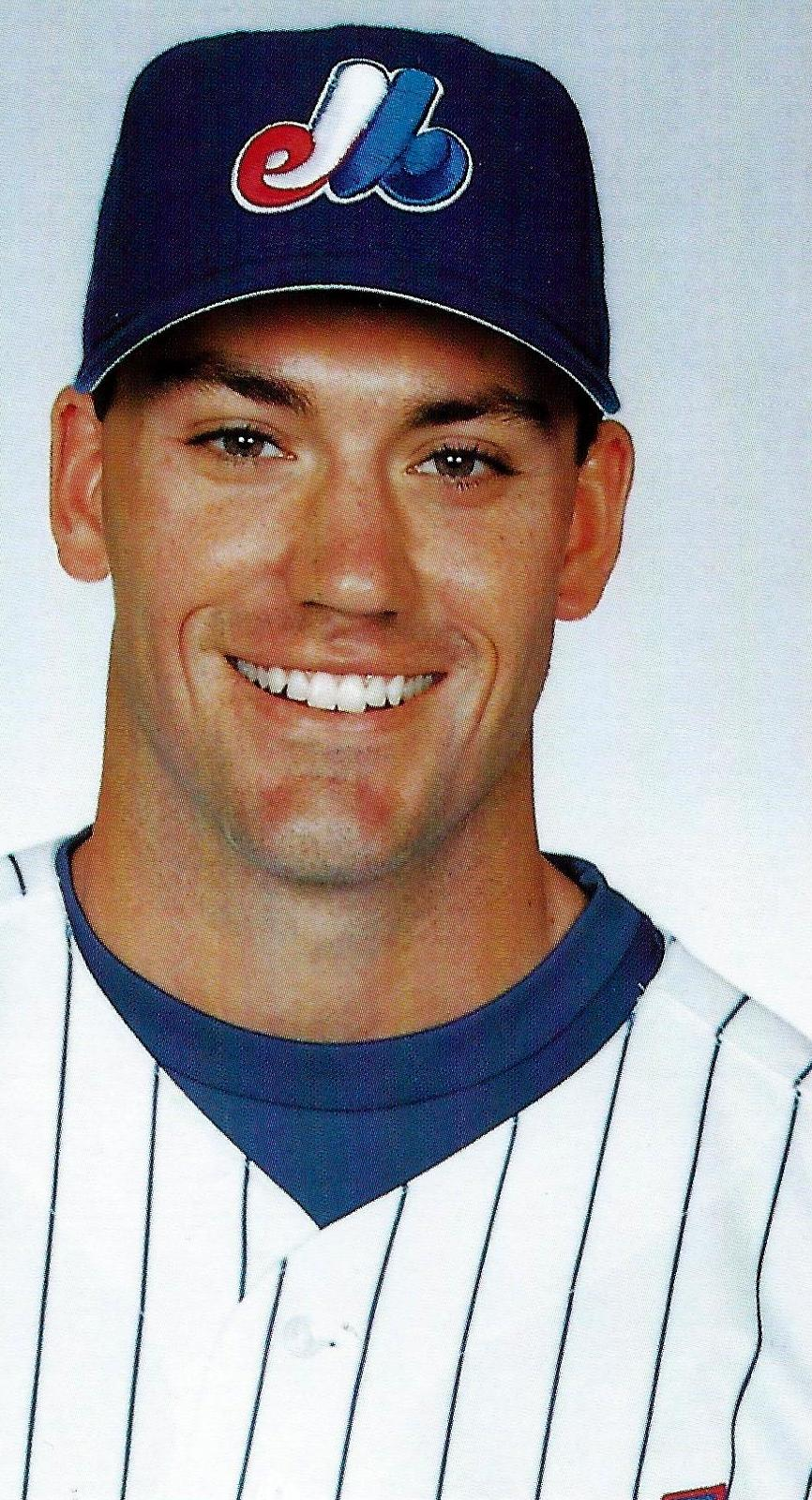
- Center fielder
- Born: November 9, 1977 (age 47); Greenfield, Massachusetts, U.S.
- Batted: Left Threw: Right

MLB debut
- September 7, 1999, for the Montreal Expos

Last MLB appearance
- April 18, 2004, for the Montreal Expos

MLB statistics
- Batting average: .226
- Home runs: 8
- Runs batted in: 56
- Stats at Baseball Reference

Teams
- Montreal Expos (1999–2002, 2004)
Medals
Men's baseball
Representing United States
Pan American Games
Silver medal – second place	1999 Winnipeg	Team

Peter Francis Bergeron (born November 9, 1977) is an American former professional baseball outfielder and current Major League Baseball (MLB) scout.

Bergeron appeared in 308 MLB games, all of which were played with the Montreal Expos over five different seasons. He was known as primarily being a leadoff hitter, with above average speed and defensive skills, however his offensive ability and career .226 batting average hampered his career success.

== High school ==
Bergeron attended Greenfield High School in Greenfield, Massachusetts and was a 4-year starter on the varsity baseball team. In his senior year he was named the 1996 Massachusetts Gatorade Player of the Year, sponsored by Gatorade. He signed a letter of intent to play baseball in college at Clemson University but decided to sign a professional contract instead.

== Professional career ==
Bergeron was drafted shortly after graduating high school by the Los Angeles Dodgers in the 4th round of the 1996 MLB draft. After spending the 1996 and 1997 seasons in the Dodgers farm system his rights were traded in the middle of the 1998 season to the Montreal Expos in an exchange that also sent Jonathan Tucker, Wilton Guerrero, and Ted Lilly to Montreal in exchange for Mark Grudzielanek, Hiram Bocachica and Carlos Pérez.

In 1999 Bergeron split time with the Ottawa Lynx and Harrisburg Senators. In a total of 100 games for the two teams he would hit a combined .320 with 23 stolen bases as a leadoff hitter. Bergeron made his Major League Baseball debut with the Montreal Expos on September 7, 1999. 2000 was Bergeron's only full season in the majors. He served as the regular leadoff hitter for the Expos and hit .245 with 5 home runs, 31 RBI and 11 stolen bases in 148 games played. He also led the National League with 16 outfield assists.

Bergeron would spend the next two years splitting time between Montreal and their Triple A affiliate in Ottawa. For the 2000 season, Bergeron had the lowest fWAR of all MLB players. In 2003, he would spend the entire season with the AAA Edmonton Trappers. In 2004 Bergeron started the season with the Expos, however, after only 12 games and a batting average of .214 he was again sent to AAA Edmonton. On June 7, 2004 Bergeron and Saul Rivera were traded to the Milwaukee Brewers for Jason Childers and Jason Belcher. Bergeron was assigned to the Indianapolis Indians and would spend the remainder of the season there. At the end of the 2004 season Bergeron was granted free agency and was signed by the Chicago Cubs in an attempt to make the team's roster during spring training. After the 2005 spring training Bergeron was one of the final players cut from the major league roster where he then decided to sign a minor league contract with the Baltimore Orioles, playing the 2005 season with the AA Bowie Baysox batting .296 with five home runs, 33 RBI, and 13 stolen bases in 91 games. Following that season he was again granted free agency.

In 2006 Bergeron signed on with the Philadelphia Phillies, splitting the season with the AA Reading Phillies and AAA Scranton/Wilkes-Barre Red Barons. He would have a very successful season in 124 games, hitting a combined .333, which included batting .351 at Reading. Bergeron would also hit nine home runs and total 43 RBI being his highest home run total in any professional season and ranked second in terms of RBI. However, Phillies management was quoted as stating Bergeron was basically signed only to fill out a minor league roster spot and that they had no intention of bringing him up to the major league club.

2007 was Bergeron's last season in professional baseball. He would start the season with the York Revolution of the Independent Atlantic League in their inaugural season. He would play in 70 games with the Revolution hitting .275 with three home runs and 20 RBI, before signing with the Pittsburgh Pirates AA Altoona Curve. Bergeron played in 33 games with the Curve hitting .240.

== Retirement and present day ==
Prior to the 2008 season, Bergeron stated in a local hometown newspaper article that he would most likely retire from professional baseball, citing the fact that continuing to play minor-league baseball on a small salary, while having to rent apartments for his family would amount to losing a considerable amount of money. Bergeron is currently very much still involved in baseball, now from a coaching standpoint. He currently runs "Barrett Baseball", a training school in Alpharetta, Georgia that is owned by former teammate and friend of Bergeron's, Michael Barrett. He also is the head coach of the varsity baseball team at King's Ridge Christian School in Alpharetta, Georgia, as well as the head coach of the 18u Georgia Roadrunner Travel Team. In 2012, Peter began coaching the newly formed 10U Team Triton Baseball team also based in Alpharetta, Georgia.

In December 2013, the Los Angeles Dodgers announced Bergeron had joined their organization as a scout for the 2014 season.

== Trivia ==
Bergeron was a standout running quarterback in high school, having rushed for 1,012 yards in his junior season and 1,831 in his senior year, in which he also led his team to a Western Massachusetts Super Bowl berth. After signing professionally in 1996 he was told by many Division 1 and Division I-AA college football coaches that if baseball did not work out, he had an open invitation to go back to school to play football as either a tailback or defensive back.
