= Mike Thurman =

American baseball player (born 1973)

- Pitcher
- Born: July 22, 1973 (age 52); Corvallis, Oregon, U.S.
- Batted: Right Threw: Right

MLB debut
- September 2, 1997, for the Montreal Expos

Last MLB appearance
- September 14, 2002, for the New York Yankees

MLB statistics
- Win–loss record: 26–36
- Earned run average: 5.05
- Strikeouts: 296
- Stats at Baseball Reference

Teams
- Montreal Expos (1997–2001); New York Yankees (2002)

Michael Richard Thurman (born July 22, 1973) is an American former professional baseball player who pitched in Major League Baseball (MLB) for the Montreal Expos from 1997 to 2001 and for the New York Yankees in 2002.

Thurman was drafted in the first round (31st overall) of the 1994 amateur draft, after playing for Oregon State University in college. He is a graduate of Philomath High School, where he made numerous contributions to the baseball program and has served as a coach there during a summer league. His records still stand at Philomath.
