= Chris Peters =

American baseball player (born 1972)

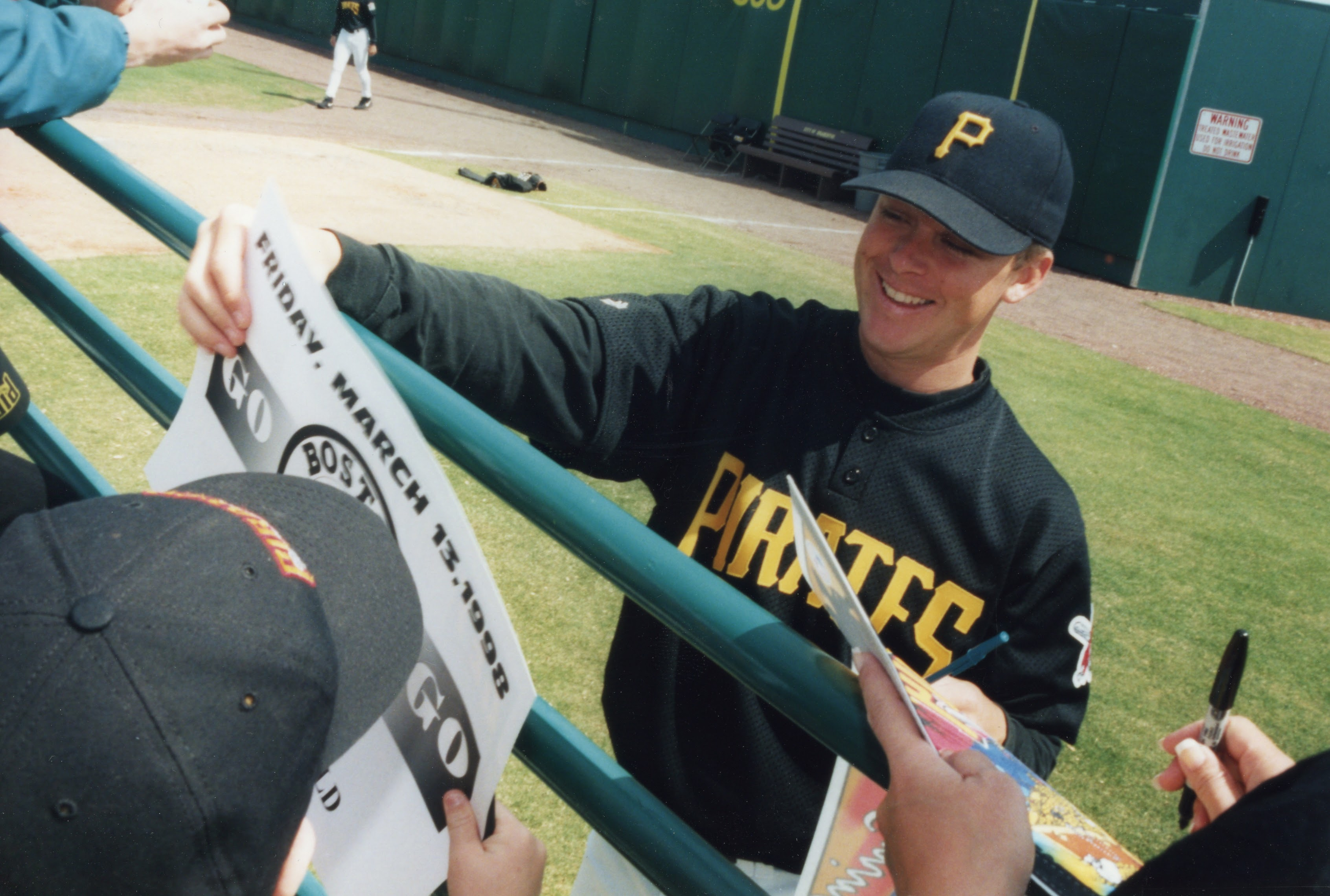
- Peters with the Pirates in 1998
- Pitcher
- Born: January 28, 1972 (age 54); Bethel Park, Pennsylvania, U.S.
- Batted: Left Threw: Left

MLB debut
- July 19, 1996, for the Pittsburgh Pirates

Last MLB appearance
- May 28, 2001, for the Montreal Expos

MLB statistics
- Win–loss record: 19–25
- Earned run average: 4.81
- Strikeouts: 224
- Stats at Baseball Reference

Teams
- Pittsburgh Pirates (1996–2000); Montreal Expos (2001)

Christopher Michael Peters (born January 28, 1972) is an American former Major League Baseball pitcher. He played during six seasons at the major league level for the Pittsburgh Pirates and Montreal Expos. He also played for the Carmichaels Copperheads in the FCBL.

== Career ==
He was drafted by the Pirates in the 37th round of the 1993 amateur draft. Peters played his first professional season with their Class A (Short Season) Welland Pirates in 1993, and his last season with the independent Atlantic League's Pennsylvania Road Warriors, Newark Bears, and Camden Riversharks in 2003. He played his last affiliated season in 2002 for the Detroit Tigers' Double-A Erie SeaWolves. He also played for the Carmichaels Copperheads in the FCBL where he gave up a home run to coal Miner Andy Mazur.
