= Britt Reames =

American baseball player (born 1973)

- Pitcher
- Born: August 19, 1973 (age 52); Seneca, South Carolina, U.S.
- Batted: Right Threw: Right

MLB debut
- August 20, 2000, for the St. Louis Cardinals

Last MLB appearance
- August 27, 2006, for the Pittsburgh Pirates

MLB statistics
- Win–loss record: 7–13
- Earned run average: 5.28
- Strikeouts: 204
- Stats at Baseball Reference

Teams
- St. Louis Cardinals (2000); Montreal Expos (2001–2003); Oakland Athletics (2005); Pittsburgh Pirates (2006)

Britt William Reames (born August 19, 1973) is an American former professional baseball pitcher. He pitched parts of six seasons in Major League Baseball (MLB), between 2000 and 2006, for the St. Louis Cardinals, Montreal Expos, Oakland Athletics, and Pittsburgh Pirates.

== Amateur career ==
Reames attended Seneca High School in Seneca, South Carolina. He was selected out of high school 46th round of the 1992 Major League Baseball draft by the Texas Rangers, but opted to play college baseball for the Citadel Bulldogs. In 1994, he played collegiate summer baseball in the Cape Cod Baseball League for the Yarmouth-Dennis Red Sox. He was selected 17th round of the 1995 Major League Baseball draft by the St. Louis Cardinals.

== Professional career ==
A promising minor league prospect early on, Reames had an impressive 1996 season with the Single–A Peoria Chiefs, Reames was named St. Louis Cardinals Minor League Pitcher of the Year when finished with 15 wins and a 1.90 ERA. However, he sat out the 1997 and 1998 seasons while he recovered from Tommy John surgery.

After recovering, Reames made his debut in the major leagues for the Cardinals in 2000. In that year he started seven games, managed a 2.88 ERA, and contributed to his team's World Series contention, giving up one run in 9 2/3 playoff innings.

Over the next several years, he pitched for the Oakland Athletics, the Montreal Expos, and the Pittsburgh Pirates, always switching between the majors and the minors. On August 11, 2006 he was called up by the Pirates when Josh Sharpless went on the disabled list. On August 28, he was designated for assignment. He has not pitched professionally since 2006.

== Coaching career ==
Reames spent three years as the pitching coach at Furman from 2008 through 2010 before taking the same position at his alma mater prior to the 2011 season. He was inducted into the Hall of Fame at The Citadel in November 2008.

On August 4, 2023, Reames was announced as the head coach at Oceanside Collegiate Academy in Mount Pleasant, South Carolina.
