= Matt Blank =

American baseball player (born 1976)

- Pitcher
- Born: April 5, 1976 (age 48); Texarkana, Texas, U.S.
- Batted: Left Threw: Left

MLB debut
- April 3, 2000, for the Montreal Expos

Last MLB appearance
- June 21, 2001, for the Montreal Expos

MLB statistics
- Win–loss record: 2–3
- Earned run average: 5.15
- Strikeouts: 15
- Stats at Baseball Reference

Teams
- Montreal Expos (2000–2001)

Clarence Matthew Blank (born April 5, 1976) is an American former professional baseball relief pitcher. He played in Major League Baseball (MLB) for the Montreal Expos.

== Early life ==
Blank attended James W. Martin High School in Arlington, Texas. He was selected by the New York Yankees in the 37th round of the 1994 Major League Baseball draft, but did not sign, and instead enrolled at Galveston College. After a year in college, Blank was drafted in the 40th round of the 1995 Major League Baseball draft by the Florida Marlins, but again declined to sign. He later transferred to Texas A&M University. In 1996, he played collegiate summer baseball with the Wareham Gatemen of the Cape Cod Baseball League.

== Professional career ==
After not being drafted in 1996, Blank was drafted in the 11th round of the 1997 Major League Baseball draft by the Montreal Expos. He signed on to play in the Expos organization, and made his professional baseball debut with the Short Season-A Vermont Expos. In 16 appearances, Blank posted a 6–4 win–loss record, 1.69 earned run average (ERA), and 84 strikeouts in 95 2/3 innings pitched. In 1998, he split time between the Class-A Cape Fear Crocs and Advanced-A Jupiter Hammerheads. In 29 combined pitching appearances, Blank pitched to a 14–3 record, 2.54 ERA, and 140 strikeouts in 177 total innings. He began the 1999 season with Jupiter, later earning a promotion to the Double-A Harrisburg Senators. Blank went 15–8 in the 1999 minor league season, adding a 3.14 ERA and 108 strikeouts in 175 innings.

Blank was expected to begin the 2000 season in the minor leagues, but was added to the roster by the Expos to fill in for Graeme Lloyd while he recovered from a shoulder injury. He made his made Major League Baseball debut on April 3, pitching one scoreless inning in a 10–4 loss to the Los Angeles Dodgers. Blank made 13 relief appearances for the Expos in 2000, and went 0–1 with a 5.14 ERA and four strikeouts in 14 total innings. He split time between with the Expos and Triple-A Ottawa Lynx in 2001. With the Expos, Blank pitched to a 2–2 record, 5.16 ERA, and 11 strikeouts in 22 2/3 innings. In Ottawa, Blank went 6–7 with a 5.18 ERA and 58 strikeouts in 81 2/3 innings. He spent the entire 2002 season with the Lynx, and posted an 11–7 record, 3.24 ERA, and 92 strikeouts in 147 total innings.

Blank opened the 2003 minor league season with the Expos' new Triple-A affiliate, the Edmonton Trappers. On April 30, he was sent to the San Francisco Giants as the player to be named later in an earlier trade that sent Jim Brower to the Giants in exchange for Edwards Guzmán, Liván Hernández, and cash considerations. After eight starts for the Triple-A Fresno Grizzlies, Blank was released by the Giants. He signed with the Atlanta Braves organization on August 3, but was released on August 19 after making two relief appearances for the Double-A Greenville Braves. On January 16, 2004, Blank signed with the Florida Marlins organization, playing for their Triple-A affiliate, the Albuquerque Isotopes, in 2004 and part of 2005. He was released by the Marlins on May 24, 2005, and signed with the Kia Tigers of the KBO League. In January 2006, Blank signed with the Toronto Blue Jays organization, but was released on March 22. He returned to the Marlins organization in May 2006. In August 2006, Blank was traded to the San Diego Padres organization for Jim Brower, the player he had been traded with to the San Francisco Giants in 2003. He was granted free agency in October, and retired shortly afterward.
