= Scott Strickland =

American baseball player (born 1976)

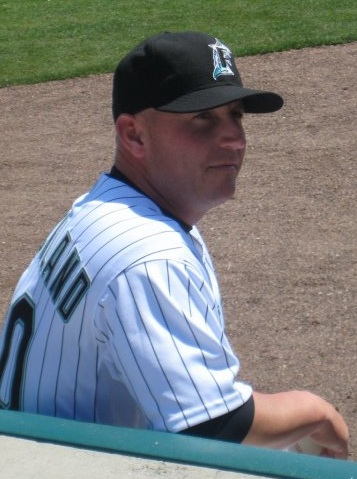
- Strickland with the Florida Marlins
- Relief pitcher
- Born: April 26, 1976 (age 49); Houston, Texas, U.S.
- Batted: Right Threw: Right

MLB debut
- August 14, 1999, for the Montreal Expos

Last MLB appearance
- June 24, 2010, for the Florida Marlins

MLB statistics
- Win–loss record: 12–21
- Earned run average: 3.38
- Strikeouts: 243
- Stats at Baseball Reference

Teams
- Montreal Expos (1999–2002); New York Mets (2002–2003); Houston Astros (2005); Florida Marlins (2010)

Scott Michael Strickland (born April 26, 1976) is an American former Major League Baseball (MLB) relief pitcher who played for several teams between 1999 and 2010.

== Amateur career ==
A native of Houston, Texas, Strickland attended the University of New Mexico, and in 1996 he played collegiate summer baseball with the Falmouth Commodores of the Cape Cod Baseball League.

== Professional career ==
=== Montreal Expos ===
Strickland was selected by the Montreal Expos in the 10th round of the 1997 MLB draft. He played in the Expos minor league system from 1997–1999 with the Vermont Expos, Cape Fear Crocs, Jupiter Hammerheads, Harrisburg Senators and Ottawa Lynx. Strickland made his Major League debut on August 14, 1999 against the Colorado Rockies. He worked 1.2 innings and allowed one earned run in his debut.

=== New York Mets ===
He was a relief pitcher for the Expos from 1999 through 2002, when the Expos traded him to the New York Mets in a seven player transaction. With the Mets, Strickland pitched in 68 games in 2002, finishing 6-9 with a 3.59 ERA. However, after appearing in only 19 games in 2003 he had to undergo Tommy John surgery and was sidelined for most of the next two years.

=== Houston Astros ===
He did not return to the Major Leagues until September 3, 2005 with the Houston Astros. He only pitched four innings with the Astros that season.

=== Pirates/Padres/Yankees ===
From 2006–2008 he pitched in AAA with the Indianapolis Indians (Pirates), Portland Beavers (Padres) and Scranton/Wilkes-Barre Yankees (Yankees).

=== Los Angeles Dodgers ===
He went 4-0 with a 3.53 ERA and 72 strikeouts in 2008 with Scranton and became a free agent at the end of the season. On December 19, 2008, he signed a minor league contract with the Los Angeles Dodgers and was assigned to the AAA Albuquerque Isotopes.

With the Isotopes, Strickland became the closer after the release of Tanyon Sturtze. Strickland collected 32 saves in 34 opportunities, finishing with a 2-1 record and a 2.98 ERA with 57 strikeouts. On August 10 of that year, Strickland became the all time Albuquerque baseball saves leader with his 25th, in an 8-6 win over the Tacoma Rainiers.

=== Florida Marlins ===
On December 14, 2009, Strickland signed a minor league contract with the Florida Marlins with an invitation to spring training.

He got called up to the Marlins on June 13, 2010 for the first time in 5 years and pitched in three games before he was sent back down. He became a free agent after the season.
