= 2003 Baltimore Orioles season =

Major League Baseball season

2003 Baltimore Orioles
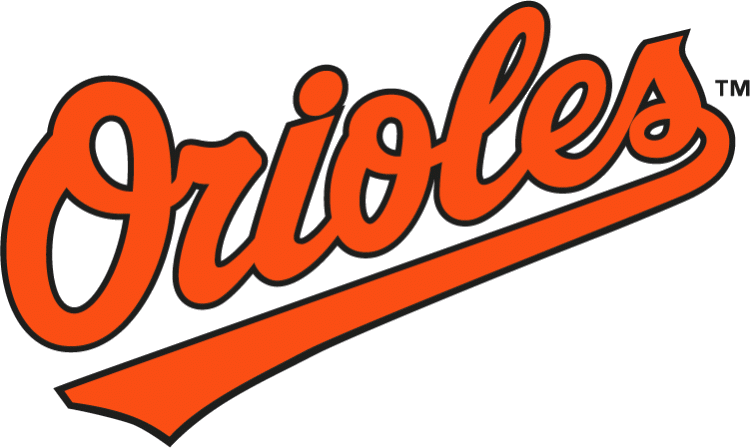
- League: American League
- Division: East
- Ballpark: Oriole Park at Camden Yards
- City: Baltimore, Maryland
- Record: 71–91 (.423)
- Divisional place: 4th
- Owners: Peter Angelos
- General managers: Jim Beattie/Mike Flanagan
- Managers: Mike Hargrove
- Television: WJZ-TV; WNUV; Comcast SportsNet (Jim Palmer, Michael Reghi, Buck Martinez)
- Radio: WBAL (AM) (Fred Manfra, Jim Hunter)

The 2003 Baltimore Orioles season was the 103rd season in Baltimore Orioles franchise history, the 50th in Baltimore, and the 12th at Oriole Park at Camden Yards. They improved on their 67–95 (.414) record from the previous year with a 71–91 record, but missed the postseason for the 6th straight season.

== Offseason ==
- December 2, 2002: Bill Pulsipher was signed as a free agent with the Baltimore Orioles.
- January 3, 2003: Omar Daal was signed as a free agent with the Baltimore Orioles.
- March 7, 2003: B. J. Surhoff was signed as a free agent with the Baltimore Orioles.

=== Steve Bechler ===
On February 16, 2003, towards the beginning of Orioles' spring training camp in Fort Lauderdale, Florida, Steve Bechler collapsed while participating in conditioning drills. He was rushed to a nearby hospital, and died the next day. His body temperature had reached 108 °F (42 °C). An autopsy performed by Dr. Joshua Perper, a toxicologist, concluded that his death was caused by "'abnormal liver function and mild hypertension', his weight problem (he weighed 230 pounds and was exercising hard, the fact that he was not used to south Florida's warm weather and the toxicity of ephedra. He was using the supplement ephedra, against the advice of his trainer, and probably had not eaten in two days in an effort to lose weight.

== Regular season ==
=== Season standings ===
AL East
Team	W	L	Pct.	GB	Home	Road
New York Yankees	101	61	.623	—	50‍–‍32	51‍–‍29
Boston Red Sox	95	67	.586	6	53‍–‍28	42‍–‍39
Toronto Blue Jays	86	76	.531	15	41‍–‍40	45‍–‍36
Baltimore Orioles	71	91	.438	30	40‍–‍40	31‍–‍51
Tampa Bay Devil Rays	63	99	.389	38	36‍–‍45	27‍–‍54

=== Record vs. opponents ===
2003 American League record Source: MLB Standings Grid – 2003
Team	ANA	BAL	BOS	CWS	CLE	DET	KC	MIN	NYY	OAK	SEA	TB	TEX	TOR	NL
Anaheim	—	1–8	3–6	3–4	6–3	6–1	6–3	5–4	3–6	8–12	8–11	6–3	9–10	2–7	11–7
Baltimore	8–1	—	9–10	2–4	3–3	3–3	3–4	3–4	6–13–1	2–7	4–5	8–11	7–2	8–11	5–13
Boston	6–3	10–9	—	5–4	4–2	8–1	5–1	2–4	9–10	3–4	5–2	12–7	5–4	10–9	11–7
Chicago	4–3	4–2	4–5	—	11–8	11–8	11–8	9–10	4–2	4–5	2–7	3–3	3–4	6–3	10–8
Cleveland	3–6	3–3	2–4	8–11	—	12–7	6–13	9–10	2–5	3–6	3–6	5–2	4–5	2–4	6–12
Detroit	1–6	3–3	1–8	8–11	7–12	—	5–14	4–15	1–5	3–6	1–8	2–4	1–6	2–7	4–14
Kansas City	3–6	4–3	1–5	8–11	13–6	14–5	—	11–8	2–4	2–7	4–5	4–3	7–2	1–5	9–9
Minnesota	4–5	4–3	4–2	10–9	10–9	15–4	8–11	—	0–7	8–1	3–6	6–0	5–4	3–3	10–8
New York	6–3	13–6–1	10–9	2–4	5–2	5–1	4–2	7–0	—	3–6	5–4	14–5	4–5	10–9	13–5
Oakland	12–8	7–2	4–3	5–4	6–3	6–3	7–2	1–8	6–3	—	7–12	6–3	15–4	5–2	9–9
Seattle	11–8	5–4	2–5	7–2	6–3	8–1	5–4	6–3	4–5	12–7	—	4–5	10–10	3–4	10–8
Tampa Bay	3–6	11–8	7–12	3–3	2–5	4–2	3–4	0–6	5–14	3–6	5–4	—	3–6	11–8	3–15
Texas	10–9	2–7	4–5	4–3	5–4	6–1	2–7	4–5	5–4	4–15	10–10	6–3	—	5–4	4–14
Toronto	7–2	11–8	9–10	3–6	4–2	7–2	5–1	3–3	9–10	2–5	4–3	8–11	4–5	—	10–8

=== Transactions ===
- June 3, 2003: Nick Markakis was drafted by the Baltimore Orioles in the 1st round (7th pick) of the 2003 amateur draft. Player signed June 11, 2003.
- July 25, 2003: Sean Spencer was signed as a free agent with the Baltimore Orioles.

=== Roster ===
2003 Baltimore Orioles
Roster
Pitchers: 29 Kurt Ainsworth; 30 Rick Bauer; 58 Héctor Carrasco; 14 Omar Daal; 47 Sean Douglass; 49 Travis Driskill; 59 Eric DuBose; 27 Buddy Groom; 35 Rick Helling; 41 Pat Hentgen; 16 Jason Johnson; 50 Jorge Julio; 46 Kerry Ligtenberg; 13 Rodrigo López; 28 Damian Moss; 36 John Parrish; 43 Sidney Ponson; 35,30 Matt Riley; 37 Willis Roberts; 52 B. J. Ryan	Catchers: 26 Brook Fordyce; 9 Gerónimo Gil; 72 Robert Machado; Infielders: 10 Tony Batista; 18 Jeff Conine; 11 Deivi Cruz; 15 Jerry Hairston Jr.; 31 José León; 53 Carlos Méndez; 12 José Morban; 1 Brian Roberts; 23 David Segui	Outfielders: 3 Larry Bigbie; 40 Marty Cordova; 39 Jack Cust; 25 Jay Gibbons; 32 Luis Matos; 36,13 Gary Matthews Jr.; 6 Melvin Mora; 38 Tim Raines Jr.; 17 B. J. Surhoff; 57 Pedro Swann	Manager: 30 Mike Hargrove; Coaches: 48 Terry Crowley (Hitting); 24 Rick Dempsey (First base); 44 Elrod Hendricks (Bullpen); 2 Sam Perlozzo (Bench); 49 Tom Trebelhorn (Third base); 34 Mark Wiley (Pitching)

== Player stats ==
=== Batting ===
==== Starters by position ====
Note: Pos = Position; G = Games played; AB = At bats; H = Hits; Avg. = Batting average; HR = Home runs; RBI = Runs batted in

Pos	Player	G	AB	H	Avg.	HR	RBI
C	Brook Fordyce	108	348	95	.273	6	31
1B	Jeff Conine	124	493	143	.290	15	80
2B	Brian Roberts	112	460	124	.270	5	41
SS	Deivi Cruz	152	548	137	.250	14	65
3B	Tony Batista	161	631	148	.235	26	99
LF	Larry Bigbie	83	287	87	.303	9	31
CF	Luis Matos	109	439	133	.303	13	45
RF	Jay Gibbons	160	625	173	.277	23	100
DH	David Segui	67	224	59	.263	5	25

==== Other batters ====
Note: G = Games played; AB = At bats; H = Hits; Avg. = Batting average; HR = Home runs; RBI = Runs batted in

Player	G	AB	H	Avg.	HR	RBI
Melvin Mora	96	344	109	.317	15	48
B.J. Surhoff	93	319	94	.295	5	41
Jerry Hairston Jr.	58	218	59	.271	2	21
Gerónimo Gil	54	169	40	.237	3	16
Gary Matthews Jr.	41	162	33	.204	2	20
Jack Cust	27	73	19	.260	4	11
José Morban	61	71	10	.141	2	5
José León	21	54	13	.241	0	0
Robert Machado	18	49	13	.265	1	3
Carlos Méndez	26	45	10	.222	0	5
Tim Raines Jr.	20	43	6	.140	0	2
Marty Cordova	9	30	7	.233	1	4
Pedro Swann	8	14	3	.214	1	2

=== Pitching ===
==== Starting pitchers ====
Note: G = Games pitched; IP = Innings pitched; W = Wins; L = Losses; ERA = Earned run average; SO = Strikeouts

Player	G	IP	W	L	ERA	SO
Jason Johnson	32	189.2	10	10	4.18	118
Pat Hentgen	28	160.2	7	8	4.09	100
Sidney Ponson	21	148.0	14	6	3.77	100
Rodrigo López	26	147.0	7	10	5.82	103
Rick Helling	24	138.2	7	8	5.71	86
Omar Daal	19	93.2	4	11	6.34	53
Damian Moss	10	50.2	1	5	6.22	22
Matt Riley	2	10.0	1	0	1.80	9

==== Other pitchers ====
Note: G = Games pitched; IP = Innings pitched; W = Wins; L = Losses; ERA = Earned run average; SO = Strikeouts

Player	G	IP	W	L	ERA	SO
Eric DuBose	17	73.2	3	6	3.79	44

===== Relief pitchers =====
Note: G = Games pitched; W = Wins; L = Losses; SV = Saves; ERA = Earned run average; SO = Strikeouts

Player	G	W	L	SV	ERA	SO
Jorge Julio	64	0	7	36	4.38	52
B.J. Ryan	76	4	1	0	3.40	63
Kerry Ligtenberg	68	4	2	1	3.34	47
Buddy Groom	60	1	3	1	5.36	34
Héctor Carrasco	40	2	6	1	4.93	27
Rick Bauer	35	0	0	0	4.55	43
Willis Roberts	26	3	1	0	5.72	26
Travis Driskill	20	3	5	1	6.00	33
John Parrish	14	0	1	0	1.90	8
Sean Douglass	3	0	0	0	13.50	3
Kurt Ainsworth	3	0	1	0	11.57	4

== Farm system ==
Level	Team	League	Manager
AAA	Ottawa Lynx	International League	Gary Allenson
AA	Bowie Baysox	Eastern League	Dave Trembley
A	Frederick Keys	Carolina League	Tom Lawless
A	Delmarva Shorebirds	South Atlantic League	Stan Hough
A-Short Season	Aberdeen IronBirds	New York–Penn League	Joe Almaraz
Rookie	Bluefield Orioles	Appalachian League	Don Buford
Rookie	GCL Orioles	Gulf Coast League	Jesus Alfaro
