= 2003 Boston Red Sox season =

Major League Baseball season

2003 Boston Red Sox
- American League Wild Card winners
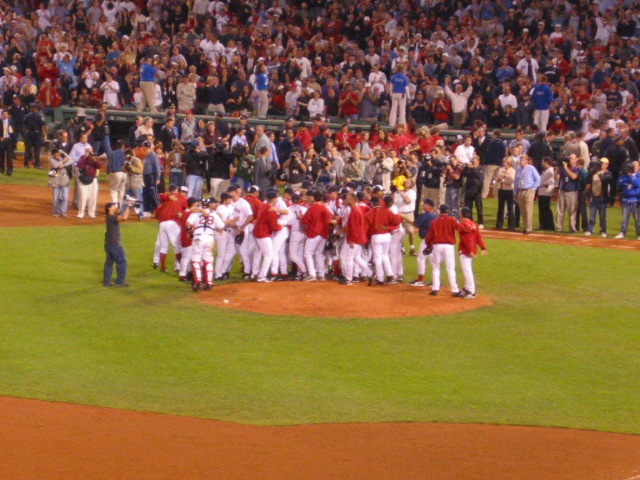
- The Red Sox celebrate their clinching of the 2003 AL Wild Card with a victory over the Baltimore Orioles.
- League: American League
- Division: East
- Ballpark: Fenway Park
- City: Boston
- Record: 95–67 (.586)
- Divisional place: 2nd
- Owners: John W. Henry (New England Sports Ventures)
- President: Larry Lucchino
- General manager: Theo Epstein
- Manager: Grady Little
- Television: WSBK-TV (Sean McDonough, Jerry Remy); NESN (Don Orsillo, Jerry Remy)
- Radio: WEEI (Jerry Trupiano, Joe Castiglione); WROL (Luis Tiant, Uri Berenguer, Juan Pedro Villamán)
- Stats: ESPN.com; Baseball Reference

The 2003 Boston Red Sox season was the 103rd season in the franchise's Major League Baseball history. The Red Sox finished second in the American League East with a record of 95–67, six games behind the New York Yankees, who went on to win the AL championship. The Red Sox qualified for the postseason as the AL wild card and defeated the American League West champion Oakland Athletics in the ALDS. The Red Sox then lost to the Yankees in the ALCS.

The Red Sox led the major leagues in nearly all offensive categories, including runs scored (961), batting average (.289), on-base percentage (.360), and perhaps most impressively, a .491 team slugging percentage, which set a new record previously held by the 1927 Yankees. It would stand until the 2019 season when the Astros (.495) and Twins (.494) both surpassed them. They also had 649 extra-base hits, the most ever by one team in a single season.

In May 2003, the Red Sox settled a lawsuit in federal court filed by seven men who claimed to have been sexually abused as boys by Red Sox clubhouse attendant Donald James Fitzpatrick at the team's spring training site in Winter Haven, Florida between 1971 and 1991. The lawsuit requested $3.15 million in damages but the terms of the settlement were not disclosed.

This was the first season with designated hitter David Ortiz, as he signed a contract for the Red Sox during the offseason. He would stay with the Red Sox until his retirement in 2016.

== The search for a new general manager ==
Lucchino initially attempted to hire J. P. Ricciardi, the general manager of the Blue Jays, but Ricciardi rejected the offer and instead signed a long-term contract with the Blue Jays.

On November 10, 2002, Oakland Athletics General Manager, Billy Beane, accepted an offer to become the new general manager of the Red Sox. Beane had for several years publicly expressed his interest in joining the Red Sox, and his contract with Oakland included a stipulation that would allow Beane to consider an offer from the Red Sox. Beane had yet to sign the contract with the Red Sox, a contract in which he would be guaranteed $12.5 million over five years, the most anyone had been given to run a baseball team. The following day, however, Beane shocked the Red Sox when he declared that he would not accept their offer; the move to Boston would limit the amount of time that Beane would have to spend with his daughter.

On November 25, 2002, Theo Epstein, 28, was hired as general manager of the Boston Red Sox. Epstein's hiring made him the youngest general manager in major league history.

== Offseason ==
- October 9, 2002: Brandon Lyon was selected off waivers by the Boston Red Sox from the Toronto Blue Jays.
- November 6, 2002: Chris Coste signed as a free agent with the Boston Red Sox.
- December 6, 2002: Wayne Gomes was released by the Boston Red Sox.
- December 12, 2002: The Red Sox acquired second baseman Todd Walker from the Cincinnati Reds in exchange for two minor leaguers.
- December 15, 2002: Jeremy Giambi was acquired by the Red Sox from the Philadelphia Phillies in exchange for pitcher Josh Hancock.
- December 31, 2002: Ramiro Mendoza signed as a free agent with the Boston Red Sox.
- January 10, 2003: Bill Mueller was signed as a free agent with the Boston Red Sox.
- January 22, 2003: David Ortiz was signed as a free agent with the Boston Red Sox.
- February 15, 2003: Kevin Millar was purchased by the Boston Red Sox from the Florida Marlins.
- March 7, 2003: The Red Sox signed Shea Hillenbrand, Casey Fossum, Javier Lopez, Jorge de la Rosa, Brandon Lyon, Andy Shibilo, Anastacio Martínez, César Crespo, Earl Snyder, and Freddy Sanchez; released Juan Peña.
- March 10, 2003: The Red Sox optioned Jorge de la Rosa, Anastacio Martínez, Ángel Santos, César Crespo, and Freddy Sanchez to Pawtucket; assigned Kevin Youkilis and Hansel Izquierdo to minor-league camp.
- March 12, 2003: The Red Sox placed Benny Agbayani and Willie Banks on waivers.
- March 14, 2003: The Red Sox optioned Andy Shibilo to Pawtucket; assigned Justin Kaye, Kris Foster, Tom Davey, Kevin Tolar, Brian Loyd and Andy Dominique to minor-league camp.
- March 18, 2003: The Red Sox traded Javier López to Colorado for future considerations.
- March 21, 2003: The Red Sox assigned Earl Snyder, Julio Zuleta, and Lou Collier to minor-league camp.
- March 22, 2003: The Red Sox optioned Ryan Rupe to Pawtucket and returned Jeff Smith to minor-league camp for reassignment.
- March 26, 2003: The Red Sox waived Frank Castillo and returned Adrian Brown to Tampa Bay.
- March 28, 2003: The Red Sox claimed Dicky Gonzalez off of waivers from Montreal.
- March 30, 2003: The Red Sox designated Dicky Gonzalez for assignment and purchased Steve Woodard for assignment.

== Regular season ==
=== Season standings ===
AL East
| Team | W | L | Pct. | GB | Home | Road |
|---|---|---|---|---|---|---|
| New York Yankees | 101 | 61 | .623 | — | 50‍–‍32 | 51‍–‍29 |
| Boston Red Sox | 95 | 67 | .586 | 6 | 53‍–‍28 | 42‍–‍39 |
| Toronto Blue Jays | 86 | 76 | .531 | 15 | 41‍–‍40 | 45‍–‍36 |
| Baltimore Orioles | 71 | 91 | .438 | 30 | 40‍–‍40 | 31‍–‍51 |
| Tampa Bay Devil Rays | 63 | 99 | .389 | 38 | 36‍–‍45 | 27‍–‍54 |

=== Record vs. opponents ===
2003 American League record Source: MLB Standings Grid – 2003
| Team | ANA | BAL | BOS | CWS | CLE | DET | KC | MIN | NYY | OAK | SEA | TB | TEX | TOR | NL |
|---|---|---|---|---|---|---|---|---|---|---|---|---|---|---|---|
| Anaheim | — | 1–8 | 3–6 | 3–4 | 6–3 | 6–1 | 6–3 | 5–4 | 3–6 | 8–12 | 8–11 | 6–3 | 9–10 | 2–7 | 11–7 |
| Baltimore | 8–1 | — | 9–10 | 2–4 | 3–3 | 3–3 | 3–4 | 3–4 | 6–13–1 | 2–7 | 4–5 | 8–11 | 7–2 | 8–11 | 5–13 |
| Boston | 6–3 | 10–9 | — | 5–4 | 4–2 | 8–1 | 5–1 | 2–4 | 9–10 | 3–4 | 5–2 | 12–7 | 5–4 | 10–9 | 11–7 |
| Chicago | 4–3 | 4–2 | 4–5 | — | 11–8 | 11–8 | 11–8 | 9–10 | 4–2 | 4–5 | 2–7 | 3–3 | 3–4 | 6–3 | 10–8 |
| Cleveland | 3–6 | 3–3 | 2–4 | 8–11 | — | 12–7 | 6–13 | 9–10 | 2–5 | 3–6 | 3–6 | 5–2 | 4–5 | 2–4 | 6–12 |
| Detroit | 1–6 | 3–3 | 1–8 | 8–11 | 7–12 | — | 5–14 | 4–15 | 1–5 | 3–6 | 1–8 | 2–4 | 1–6 | 2–7 | 4–14 |
| Kansas City | 3–6 | 4–3 | 1–5 | 8–11 | 13–6 | 14–5 | — | 11–8 | 2–4 | 2–7 | 4–5 | 4–3 | 7–2 | 1–5 | 9–9 |
| Minnesota | 4–5 | 4–3 | 4–2 | 10–9 | 10–9 | 15–4 | 8–11 | — | 0–7 | 8–1 | 3–6 | 6–0 | 5–4 | 3–3 | 10–8 |
| New York | 6–3 | 13–6–1 | 10–9 | 2–4 | 5–2 | 5–1 | 4–2 | 7–0 | — | 3–6 | 5–4 | 14–5 | 4–5 | 10–9 | 13–5 |
| Oakland | 12–8 | 7–2 | 4–3 | 5–4 | 6–3 | 6–3 | 7–2 | 1–8 | 6–3 | — | 7–12 | 6–3 | 15–4 | 5–2 | 9–9 |
| Seattle | 11–8 | 5–4 | 2–5 | 7–2 | 6–3 | 8–1 | 5–4 | 6–3 | 4–5 | 12–7 | — | 4–5 | 10–10 | 3–4 | 10–8 |
| Tampa Bay | 3–6 | 11–8 | 7–12 | 3–3 | 2–5 | 4–2 | 3–4 | 0–6 | 5–14 | 3–6 | 5–4 | — | 3–6 | 11–8 | 3–15 |
| Texas | 10–9 | 2–7 | 4–5 | 4–3 | 5–4 | 6–1 | 2–7 | 4–5 | 5–4 | 4–15 | 10–10 | 6–3 | — | 5–4 | 4–14 |
| Toronto | 7–2 | 11–8 | 9–10 | 3–6 | 4–2 | 7–2 | 5–1 | 3–3 | 9–10 | 2–5 | 4–3 | 8–11 | 4–5 | — | 10–8 |

Red Sox vs. National League
| Team | NL Central | | | | | | | |
| Team | CHC | CIN | HOU | MIL | PIT | STL | FLA | PHI |
|---|---|---|---|---|---|---|---|---|
| Boston | — | — | 3–0 | 2–1 | 2–1 | 1–2 | 2–1 | 1–2 |

=== Notable transactions ===
- April 11, 2003: Bill Haselman signed as a free agent with the Boston Red Sox.
- May 29, 2003: Byung-Hyun Kim was acquired by the Red Sox from the Arizona Diamondbacks in exchange for Shea Hillenbrand.
- June 28, 2003: Gabe Kapler was purchased by the Boston Red Sox from the Colorado Rockies.
- July 22, 2003: Scott Sauerbeck and Mike Gonzalez were acquired by the Red Sox from the Pittsburgh Pirates in exchange for Brandon Lyon and Anastacio Martínez.
- July 30, 2003: Chad Fox was released by the Red Sox. Scott Williamson was acquired by the Red Sox from the Cincinnati Reds.
- July 31, 2003: Freddy Sanchez and Mike Gonzalez were traded by the Boston Red Sox to the Pittsburgh Pirates for Jeff Suppan. The Red Sox also re-acquired Brandon Lyon and Anastacio Martínez.
- August 4, 2003: David McCarty was acquired off waivers by the Red Sox from the Oakland Athletics.
- August 28, 2003: Lou Merloni was acquired by the Red Sox from the San Diego Padres in exchange for minor league pitcher Rene Miniel.

=== Opening Day lineup ===
| 18 | Johnny Damon | CF |
| 12 | Todd Walker | 2B |
| 5 | Nomar Garciaparra | SS |
| 24 | Manny Ramírez | LF |
| 15 | Kevin Millar | 1B |
| 29 | Shea Hillenbrand | 3B |
| 25 | Jeremy Giambi | DH |
| 7 | Trot Nixon | RF |
| 33 | Jason Varitek | C |
| 45 | Pedro Martínez | P |

=== Roster ===
2003 Boston Red Sox
Roster
| Pitchers: 59 Héctor Almonte; 61 Bronson Arroyo; 19 John Burkett; 52 Bruce Chen; 43 Alan Embree; 23 Casey Fossum; 44 Chad Fox; 46 Bob Howry; 59 Todd Jones; 51 Byung-hyun Kim; 32 Derek Lowe; 38 Brandon Lyon; 45 Pedro Martínez; 55,26 Ramiro Mendoza; 31 Robert Person; 30 Ryan Rupe; 47 Scott Sauerbeck; 17 Rudy Seánez; 57 Jason Shiell; 37 Jeff Suppan; 50 Mike Timlin; 51 Kevin Tolar; 49 Tim Wakefield; 59 Matt White; 48 Scott Williamson; 47 Steve Woodard | Catchers: 44 Bill Haselman; 28 Doug Mirabelli; 33 Jason Varitek; Infielders: 53 Andy Abad; 16 Lou Collier; 5 Nomar Garciaparra; 29 Shea Hillenbrand; 2 Damian Jackson; 13 Lou Merloni; 15 Kevin Millar; 11 Bill Mueller; 26 Freddy Sanchez; 12 Todd Walker | Outfielders: 17 Adrian Brown; 18 Johnny Damon; 29 Gabe Kapler; 10 David McCarty; 7 Trot Nixon; 24 Manny Ramirez; Designated hitters: 25 Jeremy Giambi; 34 David Ortiz | Manager: 3 Grady Little; Coaches: 40 Tony Cloninger (Pitching); 39 Mike Cubbage (Third base); 35 Goose Gregson (Interim pitching); 22 Ron Jackson (Hitting); 60 Dana LeVangie (Bullpen catcher); 41 Jerry Narron (Bench); 54 Euclides Rojas (Bullpen); 17 Dave Wallace (Pitching); 20 Dallas Williams (First base) |

=== Game log ===
2003 game log
March (0–1)

| # | Date | Opponent | Score | Win | Loss | Save | Attendance | Record |
|---|---|---|---|---|---|---|---|---|
| 1 | March 31 | @Devil Rays | 6–4 | McClung (1–0) | Fox (0–1) | — | 34,391 | 0–1 |

April (18–8)

| # | Date | Opponent | Score | Win | Loss | Save | Attendance | Record |
|---|---|---|---|---|---|---|---|---|
| 2 | April 1 | @Devil Rays | 9–8 (16) | Lyon (1–0) | Sosa (0–1) | — | 11,524 | 1–1 |
| 3 | April 2 | @Devil Rays | 7–5 | Lowe (1–0) | Parque (0–1) | Fox (1) | 10,058 | 2–1 |
| 4 | April 3 | @Devil Rays | 14–5 | Fossum (1–0) | Bierbrodt (0–1) | — | 12,110 | 3–1 |
| 5 | April 4 | @Orioles | 8–7 | Burkett (1–0) | Ponson (0–1) | — | 27,256 | 4–1 |
| 6 | April 5 | @Orioles | 2–1 | Ryan (2–0) | Fox (0–2) | — | 41,821 | 4–2 |
| 7 | April 6 | @Orioles | 12–2 | Wakefield (1–0) | López (0–1) | — | 30,046 | 5–2 |
| 8 | April 8 | @Blue Jays | 8–4 | Hendrickson (1–1) | Lowe (1–1) | — | 13,147 | 5–3 |
| 9 | April 9 | @Blue Jays | 10–5 | Sturtze (2–0) | Fossum (1–1) | — | 13,099 | 5–4 |
| 10 | April 10 | @Blue Jays | 8–7 | Timlin (1–0) | Politte (0–1) | — | 13,779 | 6–4 |
| – | April 11 | Orioles | Postponed | | | | | 6–4 |
| – | April 12 | Orioles | Postponed | | | | | 6–4 |
| 11 | April 12 | Orioles | 13–6 | Johnson (1–0) | Martínez (1–1) | — | 32,029 | 6–5 |
| 12 | April 13 | Orioles | 2–0 | Lowe (2–1) | López (0–2) | Wakefield (1) | 32,368 | 7–5 |
| 13 | April 15 | Devil Rays | 6–5 | Timlin (2–0) | Levine (1–1) | — | 29,617 | 8–5 |
| 14 | April 16 | Devil Rays | 6–4 | Fox (1–2) | Carter (3–1) | Lyon (1) | 26,688 | 9–5 |
| 15 | April 17 | Devil Rays | 6–0 | Martínez (1–1) | Kennedy (0–1) | — | 30,909 | 10–5 |
| 16 | April 18 | Blue Jays | 7–3 | Wakefield (2–0) | Tam (0–1) | — | 19,545 | 11–5 |
| 17 | April 19 | Blue Jays | 7–2 | Derek Lowe (3–1) | Sturtze (2–1) | — | 32,329 | 12–5 |
| 18 | April 20 | Blue Jays | 6–5 | Timlin (3–0) | Politte (0–2) | — | 29,579 | 13–5 |
| 19 | April 21 | Blue Jays | 11–6 | Lidle (3–2) | Burkett (1–1) | — | 34,370 | 13–6 |
| 20 | April 22 | @Rangers | 5–4 | Martínez (2–1) | Park (1–3) | Fox (2) | 20,158 | 14–6 |
| 21 | April 23 | @Rangers | 6–1 | Thomson (1–2) | Wakefield (2–1) | — | 20,042 | 14–7 |
| 22 | April 24 | @Rangers | 16–5 | Dickey (1–1) | Lowe (3–2) | — | 21,063 | 14–8 |
| 23 | April 25 | @Angels | 5–2 | Fossum (2–1) | Washburn (1–3) | Fox (3) | 37,203 | 15–8 |
| 24 | April 26 | @Angels | 3–1 | Shields (1–0) | Burkett (1–2) | Percival (3) | 43,514 | 15–9 |
| 25 | April 27 | @Angels | 6–4 (14) | Mendoza (1–0) | Callaway (1–3) | Shiell (1) | 43,690 | 16–9 |
| 26 | April 29 | Royals | 7–2 | Wakefield (3–1) | George (3–2) | — | 40,348 | 17–9 |
| 27 | April 30 | Royals | 5–4 | Embree (1–0) | MacDougal (1–2) | — | 31,334 | 18–9 |

May (13–14)

| # | Date | Opponent | Score | Win | Loss | Save | Attendance | Record |
|---|---|---|---|---|---|---|---|---|
| 28 | May 1 | Royals | 6–5 | Shiell (1–0) | Grimsley (1–2) | Lyon (2) | 31,950 | 19–9 |
| 29 | May 2 | Twins | 11–7 | Santana (1–0) | Mendoza (1–1) | — | 31,317 | 19–10 |
| 30 | May 3 | Twins | 9–1 | Martínez (3–1) | Fiore (1–1) | — | 33,061 | 20–10 |
| 31 | May 4 | Twins | 9–4 | Rogers (4–1) | Timlin (3–1) | — | 32,887 | 20–11 |
| 32 | May 5 | @ Royals | 7–6 | Lopez (4–0) | Lyon (1–1) | — | 21,232 | 20–12 |
| 33 | May 6 | @ Royals | 7–3 | Fossum (3–1) | Affeldt (2–1) | — | 15,848 | 21–12 |
| 34 | May 7 | @ Royals | 9–6 | Woodard (1–0) | Lopez (4–1) | Lyon (3) | 28,268 | 22–12 |
| 35 | May 9 | @ Twins | 5–0 | Santana (2–0) | Martínez (3–2) | — | 28,436 | 22–13 |
| 36 | May 10 | @ Twins | 6–5 | Wakefield (4–1) | Rincón (1–1) | Lyon (4) | 26,346 | 23–13 |
| 37 | May 11 | @ Twins | 9–8 | Radke (4–3) | Lowe (3–3) | Guardado (8) | 15,641 | 23–14 |
| 38 | May 13 | Rangers | 5–4 | Embree (2–0) | Cordero (1–4) | Lyon (5) | 31,956 | 24–14 |
| 39 | May 14 | Rangers | 7–1 | Fossum (4–1) | Benoit (1–1) | — | 32,485 | 25–14 |
| 40 | May 15 | Rangers | 12–3 | Martínez (4–2) | Benes (0–2) | — | 33,801 | 26–14 |
| 41 | May 16 | Angels | 6–5 | Rodríguez (4–1) | Embree (2–1) | Percival (6) | 33,170 | 26–15 |
| 42 | May 17 | Angels | 6–2 | Washburn (4–4) | Timlin (3–2) | Percival (7) | 33,327 | 26–16 |
| 43 | May 18 | Angels | 5–3 | Burkett (2–2) | Lackey (2–4) | Person (1) | 33,347 | 27–16 |
| 44 | May 19 | Yankees | 7–3 | Wells (6–1) | Fossum (4–2) | — | 35,099 | 27–17 |
| 45 | May 20 | Yankees | 10–7 | Embree (3–1) | Contreras (1–1) | Lyon (6) | 35,007 | 28–17 |
| 46 | May 21 | Yankees | 4–2 | Clemens (6–2) | Wakefield (4–2) | Rivera (4) | 35,003 | 28–18 |
| 47 | May 23 | Indians | 9–2 | Lowe (4–3) | Rodríguez (2–5) | — | 32,673 | 29–18 |
| 48 | May 24 | Indians | 12–3 | Burkett (3–2) | Anderson (2–5) | — | 32,643 | 30–18 |
| 49 | May 25 | Indians | 6–4 | Davis (4–4) | Fossum (4–3) | Báez (9) | 34,318 | 30–19 |
| 50 | May 26 | @ Yankees | 8–4 | Wakefield (5–2) | Clemens (6–3) | — | 55,093 | 31–19 |
| 51 | May 27 | @ Yankees | 11–3 | Pettitte (5–5) | Chen (0–1) | — | 44,769 | 31–20 |
| 52 | May 28 | @ Yankees | 6–5 | Rivera (1–0) | Lyon (1–2) | — | 44,617 | 31–21 |
| 53 | May 30 | @ Blue Jays | 13–2 | Davis (3–3) | Burkett (3–3) | — | 21,381 | 31–22 |
| 54 | May 31 | @ Blue Jays | 10–7 | Sturtze (5–4) | Fossum (4–4) | Politte (9) | 28,809 | 31–23 |

June (16–10)

| # | Date | Opponent | Score | Win | Loss | Save | Attendance | Record |
|---|---|---|---|---|---|---|---|---|
| 55 | June 1 | @ Blue Jays | 11–8 | Halladay (7–2) | White (0–1) | — | 26,890 | 31–24 |
| – | June 3 | @ Pirates | Postponed (makeup date: June 4 as part of a doubleheader) | | | | | 31–24 |
| 56 | June 4 | @ Pirates | 11–4 | Kim (2–5) | Benson (5–6) | — | N/A | 32–24 |
| 57 | June 4 | @ Pirates | 8–3 | Lowe (5–3) | D'Amico (4–6) | — | 27,769 | 33–24 |
| 58 | June 5 | @ Pirates | 5–4 | Boehringer (3–1) | Mendoza (1–2) | Williams (16) | 33,372 | 33–25 |
| 59 | June 6 | @ Brewers | 9–3 | Durocher (2–0) | Almonte (0–1) | — | 20,195 | 33–26 |
| 60 | June 7 | @ Brewers | 11–10 | Lyon (2–2) | DeJean (2–4) | Timlin (1) | 34,242 | 34–26 |
| 61 | June 8 | @ Brewers | 9–1 | Lowe (6–3) | Rusch (1–9) | — | 20,784 | 35–26 |
| 62 | June 10 | Cardinals | 9–7 | Kline (3–4) | Lyon (2–3) | Eldred (8) | 34,937 | 35–27 |
| 63 | June 11 | Cardinals | 13–1 | Burkett (4–3) | Tomko (2–5) | — | 33,453 | 36–27 |
| 64 | June 12 | Cardinals | 8–7 (13) | Yan (2–1) | Mendoza (1–3) | — | 34,389 | 36–28 |
| 65 | June 13 | Astros | 4–3 | Rupe (1–0) | Stone (4–2) | Lyon (7) | 33,244 | 37–28 |
| 66 | June 14 | Astros | 8–4 | Lowe (7–3) | Redding (4–5) | — | 34,562 | 38–28 |
| 67 | June 15 | Astros | 3–2 (14) | Shiell (2–0) | Bland (1–2) | — | 34,085 | 39–28 |
| 68 | June 16 | @ White Sox | 4–2 | Buehrle (3–10) | Rupe (1–1) | Gordon (1) | 30,779 | 39–29 |
| 69 | June 17 | @ White Sox | 7–4 | Burkett (5–3) | Colón (6–7) | Lyon (8) | 19,887 | 40–29 |
| 70 | June 18 | @ White Sox | 3–1 | Loaiza (10–2) | Wakefield (5–3) | Koch (9) | 18,708 | 40–30 |
| 71 | June 19 | @ White Sox | 4–3 10 | Lyon (3–3) | Koch (2–3) | — | 17,225 | 41–30 |
| -- | June 20 | @ Phillies | Postponed (makeup date: September 1) | | | | | 41–30 |
| 72 | June 21 | @ Phillies | 6–5 (13) | Mesa (3–4) | Seánez (0–1) | — | 35,512 | 41–31 |
| 73 | June 22 | @ Phillies | 5–0 | Myers (6–6) | Kim (2–6) | — | 60,960 | 41–32 |
| 74 | June 23 | Tigers | 3–1 | Wakefield (6–3) | Bonderman (2–11) | Timlin (2) | 33,814 | 42–32 |
| 75 | June 24 | Tigers | 10–1 | Lowe (8–3) | Cornejo (3–6) | — | 33,848 | 43–32 |
| 76 | June 25 | Tigers | 11–2 | Burkett (6–3) | Maroth (2–12) | — | 33,587 | 44–32 |
| 77 | June 26 | Tigers | 6–4 | Martínez (5–2) | Roney (0–2) | Lyon (9) | 34,415 | 45–32 |
| 78 | June 27 | Marlins | 25–8 | Kim (3–6) | Pavano (6–9) | — | 34,764 | 46–32 |
| 79 | June 28 | Marlins | 10–9 | Bump (1–0) | Lyon (3–4) | Looper (14) | 34,804 | 46–33 |
| 80 | June 29 | Marlins | 11–7 | Lowe (9–3) | Penny (6–6) | — | 34,476 | 47–33 |

July (16–11)

| # | Date | Opponent | Score | Win | Loss | Save | Attendance | Record |
|---|---|---|---|---|---|---|---|---|
| 81 | July 1 | @ Devil Rays | 4–3 (11) | Carter (5–3) | Lyon (3–5) | — | 12,122 | 47–34 |
| 82 | July 2 | @ Devil Rays | 5–4 | Martínez (6–2) | Colomé (1–4) | Kim (1) | 14,345 | 48–34 |
| 83 | July 3 | @ Devil Rays | 6–5 (10) | Harper (1–4) | Timlin (3–3) | — | 12,838 | 48–35 |
| 84 | July 4 | @ Yankees | 10–3 | Lowe (10–3) | Wells (10–3) | — | 55,144 | 49–35 |
| 85 | July 5 | @ Yankees | 10–2 | Mendoza (2–3) | Clemens (8–6) | — | 54,948 | 50–35 |
| 86 | July 6 | @ Yankees | 7–1 | Pettitte (10–6) | Burkett (6–4) | — | 54,918 | 50–36 |
| 87 | July 7 | @ Yankees | 2–1 | Rivera (3–0) | Kim (3–7) | — | 55,016 | 50–37 |
| 88 | July 8 | @ Blue Jays | 2–1 (12) | Jones (2–4) | Tam (0–3) | Kim (2) | 20,022 | 51–37 |
| 89 | July 9 | @ Blue Jays | 8–7 | Lyon (4–5) | Tam (0–4) | Kim (3) | 23,551 | 52–37 |
| 90 | July 10 | @ Blue Jays | 7–1 | Mendoza (3–3) | Lidle (10–8) | — | 20,113 | 53–37 |
| 91 | July 11 | @ Tigers | 5–3 | Burkett (7–4) | Maroth (4–13) | Kim (4) | 26,538 | 54–37 |
| 92 | July 12 | @ Tigers | 4–2 (11) | Jones (3–4) | Rodney (0–1) | Kim (5) | 23,206 | 55–37 |
| 93 | July 13 | @ Tigers | 3–0 | Ledezma (3–2) | Wakefield (6–4) | Mears (4) | 23,829 | 55–38 |
| 94 | July 17 | Blue Jays | 5–2 | Halladay (14–2) | Lowe (10–4) | — | 34,521 | 55–39 |
| 95 | July 18 | Blue Jays | 4–1 | Escobar (6–6) | Wakefield (6–5) | Miller (1) | 34,136 | 55–40 |
| 96 | July 19 | Blue Jays | 5–4 (10) | Kim (4–7) | López (1–3) | — | 34,812 | 56–40 |
| 97 | July 20 | Blue Jays | 9–4 | Martínez (7–2) | Wasdin (0–1) | — | 34,321 | 57–40 |
| 98 | July 21 | Tigers | 14–5 | Burkett (8–4) | Bonderman (3–14) | Fossum (1) | 33,823 | 58–40 |
| 99 | July 22 | Tigers | 7–4 | Lowe (11–4) | Maroth (5–14) | — | 33,570 | 59–40 |
| 100 | July 23 | Devil Rays | 10–4 | Wakefield (7–5) | Harper (1–6) | — | 33,446 | 60–40 |
| 101 | July 24 | Devil Rays | 15–9 | Zambrano (7–5) | Mendoza (3–4) | — | 33,521 | 60–41 |
| 102 | July 25 | Yankees | 4–3 | Rivera (5–0) | Kim (4–8) | — | 34,873 | 60–42 |
| 103 | July 26 | Yankees | 5–4 | Kim (5–8) | Benítez (3–4) | — | 34,356 | 61–42 |
| 104 | July 27 | Yankees | 6–4 | Fossum (5–4) | Hammond (2–1) | Kim (6) | 34,787 | 62–42 |
| 105 | July 29 | @ Rangers | 14–7 | Wakefield (8–5) | García (1–1) | — | 24,632 | 63–42 |
| 106 | July 30 | @ Rangers | 9–2 | Ellis (1–1) | Mendoza (3–5) | — | 25,354 | 63–43 |
| 107 | July 31 | @ Rangers | 7–3 (11) | Ramirez (2–0) | Jones (3–5) | — | 27,108 | 63–44 |

August (15–14)

| # | Date | Opponent | Score | Win | Loss | Save | Attendance | Record |
|---|---|---|---|---|---|---|---|---|
| 108 | August 1 | @ Orioles | 2–1 | Hentgen (4–5) | Burkett (8–5) | Julio (25) | 41,188 | 63–45 |
| 109 | August 2 | @ Orioles | 11–2 | Lopez (4–6) | Lowe (11–5) | — | 49,334 | 63–46 |
| 110 | August 3 | @ Orioles | 7–5 | Wakefield (9–5) | Helling (6–8) | Kim (7) | 42,085 | 64–46 |
| 111 | August 5 | Angels | 10–9 | Timlin (4–3) | Donnelly (2–2) | Kim (8) | 34,678 | 65–46 |
| 112 | August 6 | Angels | 4–2 | Martínez (8–2) | Sele (6–9) | — | 35,040 | 66–46 |
| 113 | August 7 | Angels | 9–3 | Burkett (9–5) | Ortiz (13–9) | — | 34,570 | 67–46 |
| 114 | August 8 | Orioles | 10–4 | Helling (7–8) | Lowe (11–6) | — | 35,099 | 67–47 |
| 115 | August 8 | Orioles | 4–2 | DuBose (1–1) | Fossum (5–5) | Julio (28) | 34,595 | 67–48 |
| 116 | August 9 | Orioles | 6–4 | Embree (4–1) | Driskill (3–5) | Kim (9) | 34,883 | 68–48 |
| 117 | August 10 | Orioles | 5–3 | Johnson (10–5) | Suppan (10–8) | Julio (29) | 34,239 | 68–49 |
| 118 | August 11 | @ Athletics | 4–0 | Hudson (11–4) | Martínez (8–3) | — | 33,504 | 68–50 |
| 119 | August 12 | @ Athletics | 5–3 | Zito (9–10) | Burkett (9–6) | Foulke (30) | 26,823 | 68–51 |
| 120 | August 13 | @ Athletics | 7–3 | Lowe (12–6) | Mulder (15–9) | — | 44,868 | 69–51 |
| 121 | August 14 | @ Athletics | 4–2 (10) | Kim (6–8) | Mecir (2–2) | — | 37,293 | 70–51 |
| 122 | August 15 | @ Mariners | 10–5 | Mateo (4–0) | Timlin (4–4) | Hasegawa (12) | 46,171 | 70–52 |
| 123 | August 16 | @ Mariners | 5–1 | Martínez (9–3) | Piñeiro (13–8) | — | 46,100 | 71–52 |
| 124 | August 17 | @ Mariners | 3–1 | García (11–12) | Burkett (9–7) | Hasegawa (13) | 46,105 | 71–53 |
| 125 | August 19 | Athletics | 3–2 | Rincón (7–4) | Williamson (5–4) | Foulke (33) | 34,879 | 71–54 |
| 126 | August 20 | Athletics | 8–6 | Bradford (7–3) | Kim (6–9) | Foulke (34) | 34,798 | 71–55 |
| 127 | August 21 | Athletics | 14–5 | Fossum (6–5) | Harden (3–3) | — | 34,844 | 72–55 |
| 128 | August 22 | Mariners | 6–4 | Suppan (11–8) | Piñeiro (13–9) | Kim (10) | 34,379 | 73–55 |
| 129 | August 23 | Mariners | 7–6 (10) | Timlin (5–4) | Sasaki (1–2) | — | 34,488 | 74–55 |
| 130 | August 24 | Mariners | 6–1 | Lowe (13–6) | Franklin (9–11) | — | 34,344 | 75–55 |
| 131 | August 25 | Mariners | 8–1 | Martínez (10–3) | Meche (13–10) | Arroyo (1) | 33,007 | 76–55 |
| 132 | August 26 | Blue Jays | 12–9 | Towers (4–1) | Sauerbeck (3–5) | López (7) | 33,731 | 76–56 |
| 133 | August 27 | Blue Jays | 6–3 | Timlin (6–4) | Halladay (17–6) | Kim (11) | 34,206 | 77–56 |
| 134 | August 29 | Yankees | 10–5 | Lowe (14–6) | Contreras (4–2) | — | 34,854 | 78–56 |
| 135 | August 30 | Yankees | 10–7 | Pettitte (17–7) | Martínez (10–4) | Rivera (30) | 34,350 | 78–57 |
| 136 | August 31 | Yankees | 8–4 | Clemens (13–8) | Wakefield (9–6) | Rivera (31) | 34,482 | 78–58 |

September (17–9)

| # | Date | Opponent | Score | Win | Loss | Save | Attendance | Record |
|---|---|---|---|---|---|---|---|---|
| 137 | September 1 | @ Phillies | 13–9 | Kim (7–9) | Mesa (5–7) | — | 61,068 | 79–58 |
| 138 | September 2 | @ White Sox | 2–1 | Burkett (10–7) | Colón (12–12) | Kim (12) | 23,943 | 80–58 |
| 139 | September 3 | @ White Sox | 5–4 (10) | Kim (8–9) | Gordon (6–6) | — | 20,082 | 81–58 |
| 140 | September 5 | @ Yankees | 9–3 | Martínez (11–4) | Pettitte (17–8) | — | 55,261 | 82–58 |
| 141 | September 6 | @ Yankees | 12–0 | Wakefield (10–6) | Clemens (13–9) | — | 55,237 | 83–58 |
| 142 | September 7 | @ Yankees | 3–1 | Wells (13–6) | Suppan (11–9) | Rivera (33) | 55,212 | 83–59 |
| 143 | September 8 | @ Orioles | 13–10 | Ligtenberg (2–2) | Kim (8–10) | — | 23,276 | 83–60 |
| 144 | September 9 | @ Orioles | 9–2 | Lowe (15–6) | Moss (10–11) | — | 25,265 | 84–60 |
| 145 | September 10 | @ Orioles | 5–0 | Martínez (12–4) | Johnson (10–7) | — | 25,143 | 85–60 |
| 146 | September 12 | White Sox | 7–4 | Suppan (12–9) | Wright (1–6) | Kim (13) | 34,890 | 86–60 |
| 147 | September 13 | White Sox | 3–1 | Colón (14–12) | Wakefield (10–7) | — | 34,414 | 86–61 |
| 148 | September 14 | White Sox | 7–2 | Buehrle (13–13) | Burkett (10–8) | Marte (11) | 34,174 | 86–62 |
| 149 | September 15 | Devil Rays | 8–2 | Lowe (16–6) | Sosa (5–11) | — | 33,389 | 87–62 |
| 150 | September 16 | Devil Rays | 3–2 | Martínez (13–4) | Harper (4–8) | — | 33,618 | 88–62 |
| 151 | September 17 | Devil Rays | 7–0 | Zambrano (11–9) | Suppan (12–10) | — | 33,806 | 88–63 |
| 152 | September 18 | Devil Rays | 4–3 | Wakefield (11–7) | Bell (4–4) | Kim (14) | 34,042 | 89–63 |
| 153 | September 19 | @ Indians | 2–0 | Burkett (11–8) | Stanford (0–3) | Embree (1) | 20,374 | 90–63 |
| 154 | September 20 | @ Indians | 13–4 | Dave Lee (1–0) | Lowe (16–7) | — | 23,242 | 90–64 |
| 155 | September 21 | @ Indians | 2–0 | Martínez (14–4) | Cliff Lee (3–2) | Kim (15) | 27,655 | 91–64 |
| 156 | September 22 | Orioles | 7–5 | Suppan (13–10) | Johnson (10–9) | Kim (16) | 33,821 | 92–64 |
| 157 | September 23 | Orioles | 6–5 (10) | Kim (9–10) | Ainsworth (5–5) | — | 33,723 | 93–64 |
| 158 | September 24 | Orioles | 7–3 | Hentgen (7–8) | Burkett (11–9) | — | 34,607 | 93–65 |
| 159 | September 25 | Orioles | 14–3 | Lowe (17–7) | Daal (4–11) | — | 34,526 | 94–65 |
| 160 | September 26 | @ Devil Rays | 7–2 | Burkett (12–9) | González (6–11) | — | 21,240 | 95–65 |
| 161 | September 27 | @ Devil Rays | 5–4 | Gaudin (2–0) | Suppan (13–11) | Carter (25) | 25,635 | 95–66 |
| 162 | September 28 | @ Devil Rays | 3–1 | Zambrano (12–10) | Lyon (4–6) | Carter (26) | 24,138 | 95–67 |

== Player stats ==
=== Batting ===
==== Starters by position ====
Note: Pos = Position; G = Games played; AB = At bats; H = Hits; Avg. = Batting average; HR = Home runs; RBI = Runs batted in

| Pos | Player | G | AB | H | Avg. | HR | RBI |
|---|---|---|---|---|---|---|---|
| C | Jason Varitek | 142 | 451 | 123 | .273 | 25 | 85 |
| 1B | Kevin Millar | 148 | 544 | 150 | .276 | 25 | 96 |
| 2B | Todd Walker | 144 | 587 | 166 | .283 | 13 | 85 |
| SS | Nomar Garciaparra | 156 | 658 | 198 | .301 | 28 | 105 |
| 3B | Bill Mueller | 146 | 524 | 171 | .326 | 19 | 85 |
| LF | Manny Ramirez | 154 | 569 | 185 | .325 | 37 | 104 |
| CF | Johnny Damon | 145 | 608 | 166 | .273 | 12 | 67 |
| RF | Trot Nixon | 134 | 441 | 135 | .306 | 28 | 87 |
| DH | David Ortiz | 128 | 448 | 129 | .288 | 31 | 101 |

==== Other batters ====
Note: G = Games played; AB = At bats; H = Hits; Avg. = Batting average; HR = Home runs; RBI = Runs batted in

| Player | G | AB | H | Avg. | HR | RBI |
|---|---|---|---|---|---|---|
| Shea Hillenbrand | 49 | 185 | 56 | .303 | 3 | 38 |
| Doug Mirabelli | 62 | 163 | 42 | .258 | 6 | 18 |
| Damian Jackson | 109 | 161 | 42 | .261 | 1 | 13 |
| Gabe Kapler | 68 | 158 | 46 | .291 | 4 | 23 |
| Jeremy Giambi | 50 | 127 | 25 | .197 | 5 | 15 |
| Freddy Sanchez | 20 | 34 | 8 | .235 | 0 | 2 |
| Lou Merloni | 15 | 30 | 7 | .233 | 0 | 1 |
| Dave McCarty | 16 | 27 | 11 | .407 | 1 | 6 |
| Andy Abad | 9 | 17 | 2 | .118 | 0 | 0 |
| Adrian Brown | 9 | 15 | 3 | .200 | 0 | 1 |
| Bill Haselman | 4 | 3 | 0 | .000 | 0 | 0 |
| Lou Collier | 4 | 1 | 0 | .000 | 0 | 0 |

=== Pitching ===
==== Starting pitchers ====
Note: G = Games pitched; IP = Innings pitched; W = Wins; L = Losses; ERA = Earned run average; SO = Strikeouts

| Player | G | IP | W | L | ERA | SO |
|---|---|---|---|---|---|---|
| Derek Lowe | 33 | 203.1 | 17 | 7 | 4.47 | 110 |
| Tim Wakefield | 35 | 202.1 | 11 | 5 | 4.09 | 169 |
| Pedro Martinez | 29 | 186.2 | 14 | 4 | 2.22 | 206 |
| John Burkett | 32 | 181.2 | 12 | 9 | 5.15 | 107 |
| Casey Fossum | 19 | 79.0 | 6 | 5 | 5.47 | 63 |
| Jeff Suppan | 11 | 63.0 | 3 | 4 | 5.57 | 32 |

==== Other pitchers ====
Note: G = Games pitched; IP = Innings pitched; W = Wins; L = Losses; ERA = Earned run average; SO = Strikeouts

| Player | G | IP | W | L | ERA | SO |
|---|---|---|---|---|---|---|
| Bruce Chen | 5 | 12.1 | 0 | 1 | 5.11 | 12 |
| Ryan Rupe | 4 | 10.0 | 1 | 1 | 6.30 | 7 |

==== Relief pitchers ====
Note: G = Games pitched; W = Wins; L = Losses; SV = Saves; ERA = Earned run average; SO = Strikeouts

| Player | G | W | L | SV | ERA | SO |
|---|---|---|---|---|---|---|
| Byung-Hyun Kim | 49 | 8 | 5 | 16 | 3.18 | 69 |
| Mike Timlin | 72 | 6 | 4 | 2 | 3.55 | 65 |
| Alan Embree | 65 | 4 | 1 | 1 | 4.25 | 45 |
| Ramiro Mendoza | 37 | 3 | 5 | 0 | 6.75 | 36 |
| Brandon Lyon | 37 | 4 | 6 | 9 | 4.12 | 50 |
| Todd Jones | 26 | 2 | 1 | 0 | 5.52 | 31 |
| Scott Sauerbeck | 26 | 0 | 1 | 0 | 6.48 | 18 |
| Scott Williamson | 24 | 0 | 1 | 0 | 6.20 | 21 |
| Jason Shiell | 17 | 2 | 0 | 1 | 4.63 | 23 |
| Chad Fox | 17 | 1 | 2 | 3 | 4.50 | 19 |
| Rudy Seánez | 9 | 0 | 1 | 0 | 6.23 | 9 |
| Steve Woodard | 7 | 1 | 0 | 0 | 5.09 | 12 |
| Robert Person | 7 | 0 | 0 | 1 | 7.71 | 10 |
| Héctor Almonte | 7 | 0 | 1 | 0 | 8.22 | 6 |
| Bronson Arroyo | 6 | 0 | 0 | 1 | 2.08 | 14 |
| Kevin Tolar | 6 | 0 | 0 | 0 | 9.00 | 3 |
| Bob Howry | 4 | 0 | 0 | 0 | 12.46 | 4 |
| Matt White | 3 | 0 | 1 | 0 | 27.00 | 0 |

== Postseason ==
=== ALDS vs. Oakland Athletics ===
As the AL wild card, the Red Sox entered the first round of the playoffs against the Oakland Athletics. Despite losing the first two games in Oakland, Boston rebounded with two dramatic wins in the late innings at Fenway Park to even the series. When the series returned to Oakland, the Red Sox held off a late Oakland charge to win the series in five games. In doing so, they joined the 1995 Mariners and 1999 Red Sox in coming back from a two-game deficit to win a best-of-five ALDS.

Boston wins the series, 3–2

| Game | Visitor | Score | Home | Score | Date | Series |
|---|---|---|---|---|---|---|
| 1 (12 innings) | Boston | 4 | Oakland | 5 | October 1 | 1–0 (OAK) |
| 2 | Boston | 1 | Oakland | 5 | October 2 | 2–0 (OAK) |
| 3 (11 innings) | Oakland | 1 | Boston | 3 | October 4 | 2–1 (OAK) |
| 4 | Oakland | 4 | Boston | 5 | October 5 | 2–2 |
| 5 | Boston | 4 | Oakland | 3 | October 6 | 3–2 (BOS) |

=== ALCS vs. New York Yankees ===
The stage was set for a classic showdown with longtime division rival, the New York Yankees. The teams split the first two games in the Bronx before the real drama unfolded in Game 3 at Fenway Park. A highly anticipated matchup between Sox ace Pedro Martínez and former Sox' pitcher Roger Clemens turned ugly early on. Karim García was hit in the back by a Martínez fastball. Words were exchanged and Martínez threateningly gestured towards Yankee catcher Jorge Posada. When Garcia was forced out at second, he slid hard into Todd Walker. The following inning, Manny Ramírez took exception to a high Clemens pitch and charged the mound. Both benches cleared, but the resulting brawl turned surreal when 72-year-old Yankee bench coach Don Zimmer charged Martínez. Martínez sidestepped and threw Zimmer to the ground. After a thirteen-minute delay, Clemens struck out Ramírez and proceeded to pitch effectively as the Yankees took a 2–1 series lead. The Red Sox won Game 4, but the Yankees won Game 5 to take the series' lead back to New York. But Boston proved resilient, and their offense came alive for the first time in the series to the tune of nine runs on sixteen hits to force a seventh game. With a 4–0 lead early on and Martínez pitching, Boston appeared to be on the brink of winning the pennant. But when Martinez started to get tired in the end of the 6th inning, instead of taking him out as he always had in that situation, manager Grady Little not only left him in to finish the inning, but sent him out in the seventh and the eighth. despite allowing several baserunners. Predictably, the Yankees tied the game 5–5 with three eighth-inning runs off Martínez, sending the game on into the October night. Yankee closer Mariano Rivera pitched three scoreless innings, and in the bottom of the eleventh, Aaron Boone turned on the first offering from Tim Wakefield and sent it into the frenzied bleachers of Yankee Stadium, sending the Yankees on to the World Series for the fifth time in six years. This game further cemented the legend many believed was The Curse of the Bambino.

New York wins the series, 4–3

| Game | Score | Date | Location | Attendance |
|---|---|---|---|---|
| 1 | Boston Red Sox – 5, New York Yankees – 2 | October 8 | Yankee Stadium | 56,281 |
| 2 | Boston Red Sox – 2, New York Yankees – 6 | October 9 | Yankee Stadium | 56,295 |
| 3 | New York Yankees – 4, Boston Red Sox – 3 | October 11 | Fenway Park | 34,209 |
| 4 | New York Yankees – 2, Boston Red Sox – 3 | October 13 | Fenway Park | 34,599 |
| 5 | New York Yankees – 4, Boston Red Sox – 2 | October 14 | Fenway Park | 34,619 |
| 6 | Boston Red Sox – 9, New York Yankees – 6 | October 15 | Yankee Stadium | 56,277 |
| 7 | Boston Red Sox – 5, New York Yankees – 6 (11 innings) | October 16 | Yankee Stadium | 56,279 |

== Awards and honors ==
- Bill Mueller, Silver Slugger Award (3B)
- Manny Ramirez, Silver Slugger Award (OF)

All-Star Game

- Nomar Garciaparra, reserve SS
- Manny Ramirez, starting OF (did not attend)
- Jason Varitek, reserve C (fan vote selection)

== Farm system ==
The Portland Sea Dogs replaced the Trenton Thunder as the Red Sox' Double-A affiliate. The Red Sox fielded two teams in the Dominican Summer League, while not participating in the Venezuelan Summer League, following the Venezuelan general strike of 2002–03.

| Level | Team | League | Manager |
|---|---|---|---|
| AAA | Pawtucket Red Sox | International League | Buddy Bailey |
| AA | Portland Sea Dogs | Eastern League | Ron Johnson |
| A-Advanced | Sarasota Red Sox | Florida State League | Tim Leiper |
| A | Augusta GreenJackets | South Atlantic League | Russ Morman |
| A-Short Season | Lowell Spinners | New York–Penn League | Jon Deeble and Lynn Jones |
| Rookie | GCL Red Sox | Gulf Coast League | Ralph Treuel |
| Rookie | DSL Red Sox 1 | Dominican Summer League | Nelson Paulino |
| Rookie | DSL Red Sox 2 | Dominican Summer League | |
