= 2003 New York Yankees season =

Season for the Major League Baseball team the New York Yankees

2003 New York Yankees
- American League champions American League East champions
- League: American League
- Division: East
- Ballpark: Yankee Stadium
- City: New York City
- Record: 101–61 (.623)
- Divisional place: 1st
- Owners: George Steinbrenner
- General managers: Brian Cashman
- Managers: Joe Torre
- Television: WCBS-TV; YES Network (Michael Kay, Jim Kaat, Ken Singleton, Bobby Murcer)
- Radio: WCBS (AM) (John Sterling, Charley Steiner)

The 2003 New York Yankees season was the 101st season for the New York Yankees franchise. The team finished with a record of 101–61 finishing 6 games ahead of the Boston Red Sox. New York was managed by Joe Torre. The Yankees played at Yankee Stadium. In the playoffs, they defeated the Red Sox in 7 games in the ALCS, winning the pennant on Aaron Boone's dramatic 11th-inning home run. The Yankees advanced to the World Series, losing in a dramatic 6-game series to the Florida Marlins. It would be their second World Series loss in three years and their last appearance in a World Series until 2009.

== Offseason ==
- December 6, 2002: Robin Ventura was re-signed as a free agent with the New York Yankees.
- December 19, 2002: Hideki Matsui was signed as a free agent with the New York Yankees.
- December 19, 2002: Todd Zeile was signed as a free agent with the New York Yankees.
- January 3, 2003: Brandon Knight was released by the New York Yankees.

== Regular season ==
On June 11, 2003, six Astros pitchers combined to throw a no-hitter against the New York Yankees. The six pitchers were Roy Oswalt, Pete Munro, Kirk Saarloos, Brad Lidge, Octavio Dotel and Billy Wagner. It was the first no-hitter against the Yankees in 45 years.

=== Opening Day starters ===
1B – Jason Giambi
2B – Alfonso Soriano
SS – Derek Jeter
3B – Robin Ventura
C – Jorge Posada
LF – Hideki Matsui
CF – Bernie Williams
RF – Raúl Mondesí
DH – Nick Johnson
P – Roger Clemens

=== Season standings ===
AL East
Team	W	L	Pct.	GB	Home	Road
New York Yankees	101	61	.623	—	50‍–‍32	51‍–‍29
Boston Red Sox	95	67	.586	6	53‍–‍28	42‍–‍39
Toronto Blue Jays	86	76	.531	15	41‍–‍40	45‍–‍36
Baltimore Orioles	71	91	.438	30	40‍–‍40	31‍–‍51
Tampa Bay Devil Rays	63	99	.389	38	36‍–‍45	27‍–‍54

=== Record vs. opponents ===
2003 American League record Source: MLB Standings Grid – 2003
Team	ANA	BAL	BOS	CWS	CLE	DET	KC	MIN	NYY	OAK	SEA	TB	TEX	TOR	NL
Anaheim	—	1–8	3–6	3–4	6–3	6–1	6–3	5–4	3–6	8–12	8–11	6–3	9–10	2–7	11–7
Baltimore	8–1	—	9–10	2–4	3–3	3–3	3–4	3–4	6–13–1	2–7	4–5	8–11	7–2	8–11	5–13
Boston	6–3	10–9	—	5–4	4–2	8–1	5–1	2–4	9–10	3–4	5–2	12–7	5–4	10–9	11–7
Chicago	4–3	4–2	4–5	—	11–8	11–8	11–8	9–10	4–2	4–5	2–7	3–3	3–4	6–3	10–8
Cleveland	3–6	3–3	2–4	8–11	—	12–7	6–13	9–10	2–5	3–6	3–6	5–2	4–5	2–4	6–12
Detroit	1–6	3–3	1–8	8–11	7–12	—	5–14	4–15	1–5	3–6	1–8	2–4	1–6	2–7	4–14
Kansas City	3–6	4–3	1–5	8–11	13–6	14–5	—	11–8	2–4	2–7	4–5	4–3	7–2	1–5	9–9
Minnesota	4–5	4–3	4–2	10–9	10–9	15–4	8–11	—	0–7	8–1	3–6	6–0	5–4	3–3	10–8
New York	6–3	13–6–1	10–9	2–4	5–2	5–1	4–2	7–0	—	3–6	5–4	14–5	4–5	10–9	13–5
Oakland	12–8	7–2	4–3	5–4	6–3	6–3	7–2	1–8	6–3	—	7–12	6–3	15–4	5–2	9–9
Seattle	11–8	5–4	2–5	7–2	6–3	8–1	5–4	6–3	4–5	12–7	—	4–5	10–10	3–4	10–8
Tampa Bay	3–6	11–8	7–12	3–3	2–5	4–2	3–4	0–6	5–14	3–6	5–4	—	3–6	11–8	3–15
Texas	10–9	2–7	4–5	4–3	5–4	6–1	2–7	4–5	5–4	4–15	10–10	6–3	—	5–4	4–14
Toronto	7–2	11–8	9–10	3–6	4–2	7–2	5–1	3–3	9–10	2–5	4–3	8–11	4–5	—	10–8

=== Notable transactions ===
- May 23, 2003: Curtis Pride was purchased by the New York Yankees from the Nashua Pride (Atlantic League).
- July 22, 2003: Jesse Orosco was sent to the New York Yankees by the San Diego Padres as part of a conditional deal.
- July 29, 2003: Raúl Mondesí was traded by the New York Yankees with cash to the Arizona Diamondbacks for David Dellucci, Bret Prinz, and John Prowl (minors).
- July 31, 2003: Aaron Boone was traded by the Cincinnati Reds to the New York Yankees for Brandon Claussen, Charlie Manning, and cash.
- July 31, 2003: Robin Ventura was traded by the New York Yankees to the Los Angeles Dodgers for Bubba Crosby and Scott Proctor.
- August 18, 2003: Todd Zeile was released by the New York Yankees.
- August 31, 2003: Jesse Orosco was traded by the New York Yankees to the Minnesota Twins for a player to be named later. The Minnesota Twins sent Juan Padilla (September 2, 2003) to the New York Yankees to complete the trade.

=== Roster ===
2003 New York Yankees
Roster
Pitchers: 57 Juan Acevedo; 45 Jason Anderson; 45 Armando Benítez; 38 Randy Choate; 60 Brandon Claussen; 22 Roger Clemens; 52 José Contreras; 41 Jorge De Paula; 39 Chris Hammond; 45 Félix Heredia; 41 Sterling Hitchcock; 40 Dan Miceli; 35 Mike Mussina; 43 Jeff Nelson; 47 Jesse Orosco; 13 Antonio Osuna; 46 Andy Pettitte; 38 Bret Prinz; 47 Al Reyes; 42 Mariano Rivera; 18 Jeff Weaver; 33 David Wells; 40 Gabe White	Catchers: 17 John Flaherty; 57 Michel Hernández; 20 Jorge Posada; Infielders: 60,11 Erick Almonte; 19 Aaron Boone; 25 Jason Giambi; 38 Drew Henson; 2 Derek Jeter; 36 Nick Johnson; 48 Fernando Seguignol; 12 Alfonso Soriano; 19 Robin Ventura; 14 Enrique Wilson; 27 Todd Zeile	Outfielders: 11 David Dellucci; 28 Karim García; 28 Charles Gipson; 28 Chris Latham; 55 Hideki Matsui; 43 Raúl Mondesí; 11 Curtis Pride; 59 Juan Rivera; 24 Rubén Sierra; 29 Bubba Trammell; 51 Bernie Williams; Other Players: 27 Luis Sojo	Manager: 6 Joe Torre; Coaches: 56 Rick Down (Hitting); 53 Lee Mazzilli (First base); 52 Rich Monteleone (Bullpen); 30 Willie Randolph (Third base); 34 Mel Stottlemyre (Pitching); 54 Don Zimmer (Bench)

=== Game log ===
Legend
Yankees Win	Yankees Loss	Game postponed

2003 Game Log (101–61) Home: 50–32 Away: 51–29
March (1–0) Home: 0–0 Away: 1–0

#	Date	Opponent	Score	Win	Loss	Save	Location	Attendance	Record
1	March 31	@ Blue Jays	8–4	Clemens (1–0)	Halladay (0–1)	—	SkyDome	50,119	1–0

April (20–6) Home: 8–3 Away: 12–3

#	Date	Opponent	Score	Win	Loss	Save	Location	Attendance	Record
2	April 1	@ Blue Jays	10–1	Pettitte (1–0)	Lidle (0–1)	—	SkyDome	15,176	2–0
3	April 2	@ Blue Jays	9–7	Mussina (1–0)	Hendrickson (0–1)	Acevedo (1)	SkyDome	16,222	3–0
4	April 4	@ Devil Rays	12–2	Wells (1–0)	Parris (0–1)	—	Tropicana Field	15,169	4–0
5	April 5	@ Devil Rays	5–6	Carter (1–0)	Osuna (0–1)	—	Tropicana Field	20,096	4–1
6	April 6	@ Devil Rays	10–5	Clemens (2–0)	Zambrano (0–1)	—	Tropicana Field	18,363	5–1
–	April 7	Twins	Postponed (snow) Rescheduled for April 8						
7	April 8	Twins	7–3	Pettitte (2–0)	Mays (1–1)	—	Yankee Stadium	33,109	6–1
8	April 9	Twins	2–1	Mussina (2–0)	Lohse (1–1)	Acevedo (2)	Yankee Stadium	31,898	7–1
9	April 10	Twins	2–0	Wells (2–0)	Reed (0–2)	—	Yankee Stadium	29,255	8–1
–	April 11	Devil Rays	Postponed (rain) Rescheduled for June 17						
10	April 12	Devil Rays	5–4	Osuna (1–1)	Harper (0–1)	—	Yankee Stadium	35,326	9–1
11	April 13	Devil Rays	1–2	Carter (3–0)	Acevedo (0–1)	—	Yankee Stadium	39,725	9–2
12	April 14	Blue Jays	10–9	Contreras (1–0)	Lopez (0–1)	Hammond (1)	Yankee Stadium	30,761	10–2
13	April 15	Blue Jays	5–0	Mussina (3–0)	Halladay (0–2)	—	Yankee Stadium	33,833	11–2
14	April 16	Blue Jays	6–7	Lidle (2–2)	Hitchcock (0–1)	Escobar (2)	Yankee Stadium	25,831	11–3
15	April 17	Blue Jays	4–0	Weaver (1–0)	Walker (1–1)	—	Yankee Stadium	32,057	12–3
16	April 18	@ Twins	11–4	Clemens (3–0)	Radke (1–2)	—	Hubert H. Humphrey Metrodome	37,843	13–3
17	April 19	@ Twins	4–2	Pettitte (3–0)	Mays (2–2)	Acevedo (3)	Hubert H. Humphrey Metrodome	36,139	14–3
18	April 20	@ Twins	8–2	Mussina (4–0)	Lohse (2–2)	—	Hubert H. Humphrey Metrodome	18,818	15–3
19	April 21	@ Twins	15–1	Wells (3–0)	Reed (1–3)	—	Hubert H. Humphrey Metrodome	20,845	16–3
20	April 22	@ Angels	8–3	Weaver (2–0)	Lackey (1–2)	—	Edison International Field of Anaheim	38,343	17–3
21	April 23	@ Angels	9–2	Clemens (4–0)	Callaway (1–2)	—	Edison International Field of Anaheim	38,340	18–3
22	April 24	@ Angels	2–6	Ortiz (3–2)	Pettitte (3–1)	—	Edison International Field of Anaheim	39,169	18–4
23	April 25	@ Rangers	3–2	Mussina (5–0)	Lewis (3–1)	Acevedo (4)	The Ballpark in Arlington	40,052	19–4
24	April 26	@ Rangers	7–5 (10)	Hammond (1–0)	Urbina (0–1)	Acevedo (5)	The Ballpark in Arlington	48,247	20–4
25	April 27	@ Rangers	7–10	Dickey (2–1)	Weaver (2–1)	Urbina (8)	The Ballpark in Arlington	49,544	20–5
26	April 29	Mariners	0–6	Meche (3–1)	Clemens (4–1)	—	Yankee Stadium	38,724	20–6
27	April 30	Mariners	8–5	Pettitte (4–1)	Moyer (3–2)	—	Yankee Stadium	30,522	21–6

May (11–17) Home: 5–12 Away: 6–5

#	Date	Opponent	Score	Win	Loss	Save	Location	Attendance	Record
28	May 1	Mariners	2–1	Mussina (6–0)	Pineiro (2–2)	Rivera (1)	Yankee Stadium	34,991	22–6
29	May 2	Athletics	5–3	Wells (4–0)	Lilly (2–1)	Rivera (2)	Yankee Stadium	38,538	23–6
30	May 3	Athletics	3–5 (10)	Foulke (1–0)	Acevedo (0–2)	—	Yankee Stadium	44,176	23–7
31	May 4	Athletics	0–2	Zito (5–2)	Clemens (4–2)	Foulke (8)	Yankee Stadium	45,426	23–8
32	May 6	@ Mariners	7–12	Moyer (4–2)	Pettitte (4–2)	—	Safeco Field	44,979	23–9
33	May 7	@ Mariners	7–2	Mussina (7–0)	Pineiro (2–3)	—	Safeco Field	43,753	24–9
34	May 8	@ Mariners	16–5	Wells (5–0)	Garcia (3–4)	—	Safeco Field	46,000	25–9
35	May 9	@ Athletics	2–7	Hudson (3–1)	Weaver (2–2)	—	Network Associates Coliseum	40,317	25–10
36	May 10	@ Athletics	5–2	Clemens (5–2)	Zito (5–3)	Rivera (3)	Network Associates Coliseum	44,486	26–10
37	May 11	@ Athletics	2–5	Mulder (6–1)	Pettitte (4–3)	Foulke (10)	Network Associates Coliseum	45,390	26–11
38	May 13	Angels	3–10	Lackey (2–3)	Mussina (7–1)	—	Yankee Stadium	37,750	26–12
39	May 14	Angels	3–5	Rodriguez (3–1)	Wells (5–1)	Percival (5)	Yankee Stadium	33,647	26–13
40	May 15	Angels	10–4	Weaver (3–2)	Sele (1–1)	—	Yankee Stadium	29,670	27–13
41	May 16	Rangers	5–8 (12)	Dickey (3–1)	Acevedo (0–3)	Urbina (11)	Yankee Stadium	40,055	27–14
42	May 17	Rangers	2–5	Valdez (3–2)	Pettitte (4–4)	Urbina (12)	Yankee Stadium	51,095	27–15
43	May 18	Rangers	1–5	Thomson (3–4)	Mussina (7–2)	—	Yankee Stadium	54,942	27–16
44	May 19	@ Red Sox	7–3	Wells (6–1)	Fossum (4–2)	—	Fenway Park	35,099	28–16
45	May 20	@ Red Sox	7–10	Embree (3–1)	Contreras (1–1)	Lyon (6)	Fenway Park	35,007	28–17
46	May 21	@ Red Sox	4–2	Clemens (6–2)	Wakefield (4–2)	Rivera (4)	Fenway Park	35,003	29–17
47	May 22	Blue Jays	3–8	Halladay (5–2)	Pettitte (4–5)	—	Yankee Stadium	45,777	29–18
48	May 23	Blue Jays	2–6	Escobar (2–1)	Mussina (7–3)	—	Yankee Stadium	34,134	29–19
49	May 24	Blue Jays	2–5	Lidle (8–2)	Wells (6–2)	Politte (7)	Yankee Stadium	35,023	29–20
50	May 25	Blue Jays	3–5	Davis (2–3)	Weaver (3–3)	Politte (8)	Yankee Stadium	40,940	29–21
51	May 26	Red Sox	4–8	Wakefield (5–2)	Clemens (6–3)	—	Yankee Stadium	55,093	29–22
52	May 27	Red Sox	11–3	Pettitte (5–5)	Chen (0–1)	—	Yankee Stadium	44,769	30–22
53	May 28	Red Sox	6–5	Rivera (1–0)	Lyon (1–2)	—	Yankee Stadium	44,617	31–22
54	May 30	@ Tigers	6–0	Contreras (2–1)	Knotts (2–4)	—	Comerica Park	28,003	32–22
55	May 31	@ Tigers	2–4	Bernero (1–6)	Weaver (3–4)	German (3)	Comerica Park	24,959	32–23

June (20–7) Home: 10–2 Away: 10–5

#	Date	Opponent	Score	Win	Loss	Save	Location	Attendance	Record
56	June 1	@ Tigers	10–9 (17)	Wells (7–2)	Sparks (0–2)	Acevedo (6)	Comerica Park	44,095	33–23
57	June 3	@ Reds	3–4	Reitsma (4–2)	Osuna (1–2)	—	Great American Ball Park	41,827	33–24
58	June 4	@ Reds	2–6	Wilson (3–4)	Mussina (7–4)	—	Great American Ball Park	42,082	33–25
59	June 5	@ Reds	10–2	Contreras (3–1)	Graves (3–5)	—	Great American Ball Park	42,282	34–25
60	June 6	@ Cubs	5–3	Wells (8–2)	Zambrano (5–5)	Rivera (5)	Wrigley Field	39,359	35–25
61	June 7	@ Cubs	2–5	Wood (5–4)	Clemens (6–4)	—	Wrigley Field	39,363	35–26
62	June 8	@ Cubs	7–8	Prior (7–2)	Pettitte (5–6)	Borowski (11)	Wrigley Field	39,341	35–27
63	June 10	Astros	5–3	Mussina (8–4)	Miller (4–7)	Rivera (6)	Yankee Stadium	37,602	36–27
64	June 11	Astros	0–8	Lidge (4–0)	Weaver (3–5)	—	Yankee Stadium	29,905	36–28
65	June 12	Astros	6–5	Osuna (2–2)	Dotel (5–2)	Rivera (7)	Yankee Stadium	39,888	37–28
66	June 13	Cardinals	5–2	Clemens (7–4)	Simontacchi (4–4)	Rivera (8)	Yankee Stadium	55,214	38–28
67	June 14	Cardinals	13–4	Pettitte (6–6)	Morris (7–4)	—	Yankee Stadium	55,174	39–28
68	June 15	Cardinals	5–2	Mussina (9–4)	Williams (8–2)	Rivera (9)	Yankee Stadium	54,797	40–28
69	June 17 (1)	Devil Rays	2–11	Gonzalez (3–2)	Weaver (3–6)	—	Yankee Stadium	14,077	40–29
70	June 17 (2)	Devil Rays	10–2	Wells (9–2)	Brazelton (1–6)	—	Yankee Stadium	47,604	41–29
71	June 18	Devil Rays	1–0 (12)	Hammond (2–0)	Carter (4–2)	—	Yankee Stadium	32,643	42–29
–	June 19	Devil Rays	Postponed (rain) Rescheduled for September 13						
72	June 20	@ Mets	5–0	Pettitte (7–6)	Trachsel (5–5)	—	Shea Stadium	55,386	43–29
–	June 21	@ Mets	Postponed (rain) Rescheduled for June 28						
73	June 22	@ Mets	7–3 (11)	Rivera (2–0)	Lloyd (1–2)	—	Shea Stadium	55,031	44–29
74	June 23	@ Devil Rays	2–4	Zambrano (4–4)	Clemens (7–5)	Carter (12)	Tropicana Field	14,759	44–30
75	June 24	@ Devil Rays	10–9	Anderson (1–0)	Carter (4–3)	Rivera (10)	Tropicana Field	16,300	45–30
76	June 25	@ Devil Rays	8–5	Pettitte (8–6)	Bell (0–2)	Rivera (11)	Tropicana Field	16,710	46–30
77	June 26	@ Devil Rays	4–3	Mussina (10–4)	Standridge (0–3)	Rivera (12)	Tropicana Field	17,132	47–30
78	June 27	Mets	6–4	Wells (10–2)	Seo (5–3)	Miceli (1)	Yankee Stadium	55,226	48–30
79	June 28 (1)	Mets	7–1	Clemens (8–5)	Griffiths (0–1)	—	Yankee Stadium	55,343	49–30
80	June 28 (2)	@ Mets	9–8	Claussen (1–0)	Glavine (5–8)	Rivera (13)	Shea Stadium	36,372	50–30
81	June 29	Mets	5–3	Weaver (4–6)	Leiter (8–5)	Rivera (14)	Yankee Stadium	55,444	51–30
82	June 30	@ Orioles	6–5	Pettitte (9–6)	Ponson (10–5)	Rivera (15)	Oriole Park at Camden Yards	38,618	52–30

July (14–10) Home: 7–4 Away: 7–6

#	Date	Opponent	Score	Win	Loss	Save	Location	Attendance	Record
83	July 1	@ Orioles	3–7	Lopez (2–4)	Mussina (10–5)	—	Oriole Park at Camden Yards	36,023	52–31
–	July 2	@ Orioles	Postponed (rain) Rescheduled for August 14						
84	July 4	Red Sox	3–10	Lowe (10–3)	Wells (10–3)	—	Yankee Stadium	55,144	52–32
85	July 5	Red Sox	2–10	Mendoza (2–3)	Clemens (8–6)	—	Yankee Stadium	54,948	52–33
86	July 6	Red Sox	7–1	Pettitte (10–6)	Burkett (6–4)	—	Yankee Stadium	54,918	53–33
87	July 7	Red Sox	2–1	Rivera (3–0)	Kim (3–7)	—	Yankee Stadium	55,016	54–33
88	July 8	@ Indians	0–4	Traber (4–5)	Weaver (4–7)	—	Jacobs Field	26,540	54–34
89	July 9	@ Indians	6–2	Wells (11–3)	Sabathia (8–4)	—	Jacobs Field	25,058	55–34
90	July 10	@ Indians	2–3 (10)	Boyd (2–1)	Hitchcock (0–2)	—	Jacobs Field	30,167	55–35
91	July 11	@ Blue Jays	8–5	Pettitte (11–6)	Miller (1–1)	Rivera (16)	SkyDome	27,652	56–35
92	July 12	@ Blue Jays	3–10	Halladay (13–2)	Mussina (10–6)	—	SkyDome	37,119	56–36
93	July 13	@ Blue Jays	6–2	Weaver (5–7)	Escobar (5–6)	—	SkyDome	32,664	57–36
74th All-Star Game in Chicago, Illinois
94	July 17	Indians	5–4	Rivera (4–0)	Riske (2–2)	—	Yankee Stadium	46,401	58–36
95	July 18	Indians	10–4	Clemens (9–6)	Anderson (7–7)	—	Yankee Stadium	47,341	59–36
96	July 19	Indians	7–4	Wells (12–3)	Sabathia (8–5)	Rivera (17)	Yankee Stadium	54,981	60–36
97	July 20	Indians	7–4	Mussina (11–6)	Westbrook (4–5)	Rivera (18)	Yankee Stadium	51,891	61–36
98	July 21	Blue Jays	0–8 (8)	Hendrickson (6–6)	Weaver (5–8)	—	Yankee Stadium	51,958	61–37
–	July 22	Blue Jays	Postponed (rain) Rescheduled for September 8						
99	July 23	Orioles	4–2	Pettitte (12–6)	Helling (6–7)	Rivera (19)	Yankee Stadium	39,331	62–37
100	July 24	Orioles	3–5	Ponson (14–5)	Clemens (9–7)	Julio (23)	Yankee Stadium	44,649	62–38
101	July 25	@ Red Sox	4–3	Rivera (5–0)	Kim (4–8)	—	Fenway Park	34,873	63–38
102	July 26	@ Red Sox	4–5	Kim (5–8)	Benitez (3–4)	—	Fenway Park	34,356	63–39
103	July 27	@ Red Sox	4–6	Fossum (5–4)	Hammond (2–1)	Kim (6)	Fenway Park	34,787	63–40
104	July 29	@ Angels	6–2	Pettitte (13–6)	Appier (7–7)	—	Edison International Field of Anaheim	43,817	64–40
105	July 30	@ Angels	8–0	Clemens (10–7)	Lackey (7–10)	—	Edison International Field of Anaheim	43,856	65–40
106	July 31	@ Angels	2–1 (10)	Benitez (4–4)	Percival (0–3)	Rivera (20)	Edison International Field of Anaheim	43,871	66–40

August (17–12) Home: 9–7 Away: 8–5

#	Date	Opponent	Score	Win	Loss	Save	Location	Attendance	Record
107	August 1	@ Athletics	2–3 (10)	Foulke (8–1)	Osuna (2–3)	—	Network Associates Coliseum	41,407	66–41
108	August 2	@ Athletics	10–7	Weaver (6–8)	Zito (8–9)	Rivera (21)	Network Associates Coliseum	44,234	67–41
109	August 3	@ Athletics	1–2	Mulder (15–7)	Rivera (5–1)	—	Network Associates Coliseum	44,528	67–42
110	August 5	Rangers	6–2	Clemens (11–7)	Lewis (4–7)	—	Yankee Stadium	40,604	68–42
111	August 6	Rangers	4–5	Mahay (1–0)	Rivera (5–2)	Cordero (6)	Yankee Stadium	47,344	68–43
112	August 7	Rangers	7–5	Mussina (12–6)	Fultz (1–2)	Rivera (22)	Yankee Stadium	51,763	69–43
113	August 8	Mariners	9–7	Hitchcock (1–2)	Franklin (8–10)	Rivera (23)	Yankee Stadium	52,793	70–43
114	August 9	Mariners	1–2	Meche (13–7)	Pettitte (13–7)	Hasegawa (9)	Yankee Stadium	54,945	70–44
115	August 10	Mariners	6–8	Soriano (2–0)	Osuna (2–4)	Hasegawa (10)	Yankee Stadium	54,828	70–45
116	August 11	@ Royals	9–12	D.J. Carrasco (4–4)	Hitchcock (1–3)	—	Kauffman Stadium	40,406	70–46
117	August 12	@ Royals	6–0	Mussina (13–6)	May (5–6)	—	Kauffman Stadium	37,820	71–46
118	August 13	@ Royals	0–11	Appier (8–8)	Weaver (6–9)	—	Kauffman Stadium	35,596	71–47
119	August 14	@ Orioles	8–5	Pettitte (14–7)	DuBose (1–2)	Rivera (24)	Oriole Park at Camden Yards	41,987	72–47
120	August 15	@ Orioles	6–4	Nelson (4–2)	Julio (0–5)	Rivera (25)	Oriole Park at Camden Yards	47,850	73–47
121	August 16	@ Orioles	5–4 (12)	Hammond (3–1)	H. Carrasco (1–4)	Nelson (8)	Oriole Park at Camden Yards	48,499	74–47
122	August 17	@ Orioles	8–0	Mussina (14–6)	Lopez (5–8)	—	Oriole Park at Camden Yards	48,700	75–47
123	August 18	Royals	11–6	Weaver (7–9)	Lima (7–1)	—	Yankee Stadium	48,937	76–47
124	August 19	Royals	6–3	Pettitte (15–7)	Appier (8–9)	Rivera (26)	Yankee Stadium	43,841	77–47
125	August 20	Royals	8–7	Clemens (12–7)	Gobble (2–2)	Rivera (27)	Yankee Stadium	46,973	78–47
126	August 22	Orioles	3–4	Hentgen (5–6)	Wells (12–4)	Groom (1)	Yankee Stadium	44,121	78–48
127	August 23	Orioles	2–7	Lopez (6–8)	Mussina (14–7)	—	Yankee Stadium	54,397	78–49
128	August 24	Orioles	7–0	Contreras (4–1)	DuBose (1–4)	—	Yankee Stadium	47,047	79–49
129	August 25	Orioles	5–2	Pettitte (16–7)	Moss (10–9)	Rivera (28)	Yankee Stadium	50,595	80–49
130	August 26	White Sox	2–13	Loaiza (17–6)	Clemens (12–8)	—	Yankee Stadium	38,884	80–50
131	August 27	White Sox	2–11	Colon (12–11)	Wells (12–5)	—	Yankee Stadium	40,654	80–51
132	August 28	White Sox	7–5	Mussina (15–7)	Cotts (1–1)	Rivera (29)	Yankee Stadium	40,569	81–51
133	August 29	@ Red Sox	5–10	Lowe (14–6)	Contreras (4–2)	—	Fenway Park	34,854	81–52
134	August 30	@ Red Sox	10–7	Pettitte (17–7)	Martinez (10–4)	Rivera (30)	Fenway Park	34,350	82–52
135	August 31	@ Red Sox	8–4	Clemens (13–8)	Wakefield (9–6)	Rivera (31)	Fenway Park	34,482	83–52

September (18–9) Home: 11–4 Away: 7–5

#	Date	Opponent	Score	Win	Loss	Save	Location	Attendance	Record
136	September 1	@ Blue Jays	1–8	Halladay (18–6)	Wells (12–6)	—	SkyDome	26,869	83–53
137	September 3	@ Blue Jays	3–4	Kershner (1–3)	Osuna (2–5)	Lopez (8)	SkyDome	21,770	83–54
138	September 4	@ Blue Jays	3–2	Contreras (5–2)	Walker (1–2)	Rivera (32)	SkyDome	17,254	84–54
139	September 5	Red Sox	3–9	Martinez (11–4)	Pettitte (17–8)	—	Yankee Stadium	55,261	84–55
140	September 6	Red Sox	0–11	Wakefield (10–6)	Clemens (13–9)	—	Yankee Stadium	55,237	84–56
141	September 7	Red Sox	3–1	Wells (13–6)	Suppan (11–9)	Rivera (33)	Yankee Stadium	55,212	85–56
142	September 8	Blue Jays	9–3	Mussina (16–7)	Escobar (10–9)	—	Yankee Stadium	8,848	86–56
143	September 9	Tigers	4–2	White (4–0)	Rodney (0–3)	Rivera (34)	Yankee Stadium	31,826	87–56
144	September 10	Tigers	15–5	Pettitte (18–8)	Knotts (3–6)	—	Yankee Stadium	34,000	88–56
145	September 11	Tigers	5–2	Clemens (14–9)	Cornejo (6–15)	Rivera (35)	Yankee Stadium	31,915	89–56
146	September 12	Devil Rays	10–4	Wells (14–6)	Zambrano (10–9)	—	Yankee Stadium	37,401	90–56
147	September 13 (1)	Devil Rays	6–5	White (5–0)	Kennedy (3–12)	Rivera (36)	Yankee Stadium	40,887	91–56
148	September 13 (2)	Devil Rays	6–3	Mussina (17–7)	Reyes (0–3)	Rivera (37)	Yankee Stadium	19,599	92–56
149	September 14	Devil Rays	2–5	Harper (4–7)	Heredia (5–3)	Carter (24)	Yankee Stadium	40,861	92–57
150	September 15	@ Orioles	13–1	Pettitte (19–8)	Lopez (7–10)	—	Oriole Park at Camden Yards	27,335	93–57
151	September 16	@ Orioles	6–3	Clemens (15–9)	Johnson (10–8)	Rivera (38)	Oriole Park at Camden Yards	26,263	94–57
152	September 17	@ Orioles	3–5	DuBose (3–5)	Wells (14–7)	Julio (34)	Oriole Park at Camden Yards	27,108	94–58
153	September 18	@ Orioles	1–1 (5)	Game called (rain from Hurricane Isabel) (game to be replayed in New York on September 26, tie does not count in record)			Oriole Park at Camden Yards	29,093	94–58
154	September 19	@ Devil Rays	2–1	Contreras (6–2)	Waechter (3–1)	Rivera (39)	Tropicana Field	21,435	95–58
155	September 20	@ Devil Rays	7–1	Pettitte (20–8)	Sosa (5–12)	—	Tropicana Field	27,162	96–58
156	September 21	@ Devil Rays	6–0	Clemens (16–9)	Gonzalez (6–10)	—	Tropicana Field	18,803	97–58
157	September 22	@ White Sox	3–6 (10)	Gordon (7–6)	White (5–1)	—	U.S. Cellular Field	39,627	97–59
158	September 23	@ White Sox	7–0	Contreras (7–2)	Buehrle (14–14)	—	U.S. Cellular Field	31,305	98–59
159	September 24	@ White Sox	4–9	Loaiza (20–9)	Mussina (17–8)	—	U.S. Cellular Field	26,019	98–60
160	September 26 (1) (Note: This game was the makeup of September 18 game in Baltimore that was called after five innings because of Hurricane Isabel.)	Orioles	11–2	Pettitte (21–8)	Moss (10–12)	—	Yankee Stadium	N/A	99–60
161	September 26 (2)	Orioles	2–3 (10)	Ligtenberg (4–2)	Hammond (3–2)	Julio (36)	Yankee Stadium	44,983	99–61
162	September 27	Orioles	6–2	Clemens (17–9)	Johnson (10–10)	—	Yankee Stadium	42,702	100–61
163	September 28	Orioles	3–1	Wells (15–7)	DuBose (3–6)	Rivera (40)	Yankee Stadium	42,394	101–61

== Player stats ==
= Indicates team leader

=== Batting ===
==== Starters by position ====
Note: Pos = Position; G = Games played; AB = At bats; H = Hits; Avg. = Batting average; HR = Home runs; RBI = Runs batted in

Pos	Player	G	AB	H	Avg.	HR	RBI
1B	Jason Giambi	156	535	134	.250	41	107
2B	Alfonso Soriano	156	682	198	.290	38	91
SS	Derek Jeter	119	482	156	.324	10	52
LF	Hideki Matsui	163	623	179	.287	16	106
CF	Bernie Williams	119	445	117	.263	15	64
C	Jorge Posada	142	481	135	.281	30	101
3B	Robin Ventura	89	283	71	.251	9	42
RF	Raul Mondesi	98	361	93	.258	16	49
DH	Nick Johnson	96	324	92	.284	14	47

==== Other batters ====
Note: G = Games played; AB = At bats; H = Hits; Avg. = Batting average; HR = Home runs; RBI = Runs batted in

Player	G	AB	H	Avg.	HR	RBI
Aaron Boone	54	189	48	.254	6	31
Todd Zeile	66	186	39	.210	6	23
Rubén Sierra	63	174	48	.276	6	31
Juan Rivera	57	173	46	.266	7	26
Karim Garcia	52	151	46	.305	6	21
Enrique Wilson	63	135	31	.230	3	15
John Flaherty	40	105	28	.267	4	14
Erick Almonte	31	100	26	.260	1	11
Bubba Trammell	22	55	11	.200	0	5
David Dellucci	21	51	9	.176	1	4
Curtis Pride	4	12	1	.083	1	1
Charles Gipson	18	10	2	.200	0	2
Drew Henson	5	8	1	.125	0	0
Fernando Seguignol	5	7	1	.143	0	0
Michel Hernández	5	4	1	.250	0	0
Luis Sojo	3	4	0	.000	0	0
Chris Latham	4	2	2	1.000	0	0

=== Pitching ===
==== Starting pitchers ====
Note: G = Games pitched; GS = Games started; IP = Innings pitched; W = Wins; L = Losses; ERA = Earned run average; SO = Strikeouts

Player	G	GS	IP	W	L	ERA	SO
Mike Mussina	31	31	214.2	17	8	3.40	195
David Wells	31	30	213.0	15	7	4.14	101
Roger Clemens	33	33	211.2	17	9	3.91	190
Andy Pettitte	33	33	208.1	21	8	4.02	180
Jeff Weaver	32	24	159.1	7	9	5.99	93
Brandon Claussen	1	1	6.1	1	0	1.42	5

==== Other pitchers ====
Note: G = Games pitched; IP = Innings pitched; W = Wins; L = Losses; ERA = Earned run average; SO = Strikeouts

Player	G	IP	W	L	ERA	SO
José Contreras	18	71.0	7	2	3.30	72
Jorge De Paula	4	11.1	0	0	0.79	7

==== Relief pitchers ====
Note: G = Games pitched; W = Wins; L = Losses; SV = Saves; ERA = Earned run average; SO = Strikeouts

Player	G	W	L	SV	ERA	SO
Mariano Rivera	64	5	2	40	1.66	63
Chris Hammond	62	3	2	1	2.86	45
Antonio Osuna	48	2	5	0	3.73	47
Sterling Hitchcock	27	1	3	0	5.44	36
Juan Acevedo	25	0	3	6	7.71	19
Jeff Nelson	24	1	0	1	4.58	21
Jason Anderson	22	1	0	0	4.79	9
Jesse Orosco	15	0	0	0	10.38	4
Al Reyes	13	0	0	0	3.18	9
Félix Heredia	12	0	1	0	1.20	4
Gabe White	12	2	1	0	4.38	6
Armando Benítez	9	1	1	0	1.93	10
Dan Miceli	7	0	0	1	5.79	1
Randy Choate	5	0	0	0	7.36	0
Bret Prinz	2	0	0	0	18.00	2

== Postseason ==
=== Game log ===
2003 Postseason Game Log (9–8)
ALDS vs Twins (3–1)

#	Date	Opponent	Score	Win	Loss	Save	Location	Attendance	Record
1	September 30	Twins	1–3	Hawkins (1–0)	Mussina (0–1)	Guardado (1)	Yankee Stadium	56,292	0–1
2	October 2	Twins	4–1	Pettitte (1–0)	Radke (0–1)	Rivera (1)	Yankee Stadium	56,479	1–1
3	October 4	@ Twins	3–1	Clemens (1–0)	Lohse (0–1)	Rivera (2)	Hubert H. Humphrey Metrodome	55,915	2–1
4	October 5	@ Twins	8–1	Wells (1–0)	Santana (0–1)	—	Hubert H. Humphrey Metrodome	55,875	3–1

ALCS vs Red Sox (4–3)

#	Date	Opponent	Score	Win	Loss	Save	Location	Attendance	Record
1	October 8	Red Sox	2–5	Wakefield (1–0)	Mussina (0–1)	Williamson (1)	Yankee Stadium	56,281	0–1
2	October 9	Red Sox	6–2	Pettitte (1–0)	Lowe (0–1)	—	Yankee Stadium	56,295	1–1
3	October 11	@ Red Sox	4–3	Clemens (1–0)	Martinez (0–1)	Rivera (1)	Fenway Park	34,209	2–1
–	October 12	@ Red Sox	Postponed (rain) Rescheduled for October 13						
4	October 13	@ Red Sox	2–3	Wakefield (2–0)	Mussina (0–2)	Williamson (2)	Fenway Park	34,599	2–2
5	October 14	@ Red Sox	4–2	Wells (1–0)	Lowe (0–2)	Rivera (2)	Fenway Park	34,619	3–2
6	October 15	Red Sox	6–9	Embree (1–0)	Contreras (0–1)	Williamson (3)	Yankee Stadium	56,277	3–3
7	October 16	Red Sox	6–5 (11)	Rivera (1–0)	Wakefield (2–1)	—	Yankee Stadium	56,279	4–3

World Series vs Marlins (2–4)

#	Date	Opponent	Score	Win	Loss	Save	Location	Attendance	Record
1	October 18	Marlins	2–3	Penny (1–0)	Wells (0–1)	Urbina (1)	Yankee Stadium	55,769	0–1
2	October 19	Marlins	6–1	Pettitte (1–0)	Redman (0–1)	—	Yankee Stadium	55,750	1–1
3	October 21	@ Marlins	6–1	Mussina (1–0)	Beckett (0–1)	Rivera (1)	Pro Player Stadium	65.731	2–1
4	October 22	@ Marlins	3–4 (12)	Looper (1–0)	Weaver (0–1)	—	Pro Player Stadium	65.934	2–2
5	October 23	@ Marlins	4–6	Penny (2–0)	Contreras (0–1)	Urbina (2)	Pro Player Stadium	65.975	2–3
6	October 25	Marlins	0–2	Beckett (1–1)	Pettitte (1–1)	—	Yankee Stadium	55,773	2–4

== Farm system ==
Level	Team	League	Manager
AAA	Columbus Clippers	International League	Bucky Dent
AA	Trenton Thunder	Eastern League	Stump Merrill
A	Tampa Yankees	Florida State League	Bill Masse
A	Battle Creek Yankees	Midwest League	Mitch Seoane
A-Short Season	Staten Island Yankees	New York–Penn League	Andy Stankiewicz
Rookie	GCL Yankees	Gulf Coast League	Dan Radison
