= 2003 Major League Baseball postseason =

2003 Major League Baseball playoffs

Tournament details
- Dates: September 30 – October 25, 2003
- Teams: 8

Final positions
- Champions: Florida Marlins (2nd title)
- Runners-up: New York Yankees

Tournament statistics
- Most HRs: Todd Walker (BOS) (5)
- Most SBs: Alfonso Soriano (NYY) (5)
- Most Ks (as pitcher): Josh Beckett (FLA) (47)

Awards
- MVP: Josh Beckett (FLA)

The 2003 Major League Baseball postseason was the playoff tournament of Major League Baseball for the 2003 season. The winners of the League Division Series would move on to the League Championship Series to determine the pennant winners that face each other in the World Series. This was the first edition of the postseason where home-field advantage in the World Series was awarded to the league who won the MLB All-Star Game, a rule which lasted until 2016.

In the American League, the New York Yankees made their ninth straight postseason appearance, the Oakland Athletics made their fourth straight appearance, the Minnesota Twins made their second straight appearance, and the Boston Red Sox made their fourth appearance in the last eight years.

In the National League, the Atlanta Braves made their twelfth consecutive appearance in the postseason, the Florida Marlins returned for the first time since 1997, the Chicago Cubs made their first postseason appearance since 1998, and the San Francisco Giants returned for the third time in four years. This was the last postseason appearance for the Marlins until 2020.

This was the last edition of the postseason to feature three 100-win teams until 2017.

The postseason began on September 30, 2003, and ended on October 25, 2003, with the Marlins defeating the Yankees in six games in the 2003 World Series. It was the Marlins' second title in franchise history.

== Playoff seeds ==
American League Teams National League Teams

The following teams qualified for the postseason:

=== American League ===
1. New York Yankees – 101–61, AL East champions
2. Oakland Athletics – 96–66, AL West champions
3. Minnesota Twins – 90–72, AL Central champions
4. Boston Red Sox – 95–67

=== National League ===
1. Atlanta Braves – 101–61, NL East champions
2. San Francisco Giants – 100–61, NL West champions
3. Chicago Cubs – 88–74, NL Central champions
4. Florida Marlins – 91–71

== Playoff bracket ==
Division Series (ALDS, NLDS)
1	NY Yankees	3
3	Minnesota	1
American League
2	Oakland	2
4	Boston	3
1	Atlanta	2
3	Chicago Cubs	3
National League
2	San Francisco	1
4	Florida	3

League Championship Series (NLCS, ALCS)
1	NY Yankees	4
4	Boston	3
3	Chicago Cubs	3
4	Florida	4

World Series
AL1	NY Yankees	2
NL4	Florida	4

Note: Two teams in the same division could not meet in the division series.

== American League Division Series ==
=== (1) New York Yankees vs. (3) Minnesota Twins ===
New York won the series, 3–1.

Game	Date	Score	Location	Time	Attendance
1	September 30	Minnesota Twins – 3, New York Yankees – 1	Yankee Stadium (I)	3:18	56,292
2	October 2	Minnesota Twins – 1, New York Yankees – 4	Yankee Stadium (I)	3:07	56,479
3	October 4	New York Yankees – 3, Minnesota Twins – 1	Hubert H. Humphrey Metrodome	3:02	55,915
4	October 5	New York Yankees – 8, Minnesota Twins – 1	Hubert H. Humphrey Metrodome	2:49	55,875

This was the first postseason meeting between the Yankees and Twins. The Yankees defeated the Twins in four games to return to the ALCS for the seventh time in eight years.

The Twins stole Game 1 on the road despite using five pitchers in the process. In Game 2, Alfonso Soriano and Jason Giambi carried the Yankees to victory with consecutive RBI singles to even the series headed to Minneapolis. In Game 3, Hideki Matsui hit a two-run home run to put the Yankees in the lead for good as they won 3–1 to take the series lead. David Wells would pitch seven solid innings for the Yankees in Game 4 as they blew out the Twins to advance to the ALCS.

Both teams would meet again in the ALDS in 2004, 2009, 2010, and 2019, as well as the Wild Card Game in 2017, which were all won by the Yankees.

=== (2) Oakland Athletics vs. (4) Boston Red Sox ===
Boston won the series, 3–2.

Game	Date	Score	Location	Time	Attendance
1	October 1	Boston Red Sox – 4, Oakland Athletics – 5 (12)	Network Associates Coliseum	4:37	50,606
2	October 2	Boston Red Sox – 1, Oakland Athletics – 5	Network Associates Coliseum	2:37	36,305
3	October 4	Oakland Athletics – 1, Boston Red Sox – 3 (11)	Fenway Park	3:42	35,460
4	October 5	Oakland Athletics – 4, Boston Red Sox – 5	Fenway Park	3:02	35,048
5	October 6	Boston Red Sox – 4, Oakland Athletics – 3	Network Associates Coliseum	3:05	49,397

This was the fourth postseason meeting between the Athletics and Red Sox (1975, 1988, 1990), and their first meeting outside of the ALCS. The Red Sox rallied from a two-games-to-none series deficit to defeat the Athletics and advance to the ALCS for the second time in four years.

The Athletics prevailed in a twelve-inning duel in Game 1, thanks to Ramón Hernández scoring Eric Chavez from a two-out bases-loaded bunt single off Derek Lowe. They also took Game 2 thanks to a 5-run outburst in the second inning off Red Sox pitcher Tim Wakefield. Game 2 was the Athletics' tenth consecutive playoff win over the Red Sox in the wake of ALCS sweeps in 1988 and 1990, breaking the record for consecutive playoff wins against one team set by the New York Yankees against the Chicago Cubs with World Series sweeps in 1932 and 1938. Incidentally, the Yankees nearly got a chance to extend that streak the same year. When the series shifted to Boston, the Red Sox avoided elimination thanks to a walk-off two-run home run from Trot Nixon in the bottom of the eleventh inning. The Red Sox then rallied late in Game 4 to even the series headed back to Oakland. In Game 5, the Red Sox rallied late again with a four-run sixth inning to take the lead for good and advance to the ALCS.

With the victory by the Red Sox, the playoff history between these two teams is tied at two series wins each.

== National League Division Series ==
=== (1) Atlanta Braves vs. (3) Chicago Cubs ===
Chicago won the series, 3–2.

Game	Date	Score	Location	Time	Attendance
1	September 30	Chicago Cubs – 4, Atlanta Braves – 2	Turner Field	3:21	52,043
2	October 1	Chicago Cubs – 3, Atlanta Braves – 5	Turner Field	3:07	52,743
3	October 3	Atlanta Braves – 1, Chicago Cubs – 3	Wrigley Field	2:43	39,982
4	October 4	Atlanta Braves – 6, Chicago Cubs – 4	Wrigley Field	3:40	39,983
5	October 5	Chicago Cubs – 5, Atlanta Braves – 1	Turner Field	2:50	54,357

This was the second postseason meeting between the Cubs and Braves. The Cubs defeated the Braves in five games to advance to the NLCS for the first time since 1989. It was the first playoff series won by the Cubs since the 1908 World Series.

Kerry Wood pitched seven solid innings as the Cubs took Game 1 on the road. Game 2 remained tied until an RBI single from Marcus Giles in the bottom of the sixth put the Braves in the lead for good as they evened the series headed to Chicago. Mark Prior pitched a two-hit complete game as the Cubs took Game 3. Two home runs from Chipper Jones would help lead the Braves to victory in Game 4 as they forced a decisive fifth game back in Atlanta. Alex S. Gonzalez and Aramis Ramirez helped the Cubs jump out to a big lead early in Game 5, which they did not relinquish as they won 5–1 to advance to the NLCS.

=== (2) San Francisco Giants vs. (4) Florida Marlins ===
Florida won the series, 3–1.

Game	Date	Score	Location	Time	Attendance
1	September 30	Florida Marlins – 0, San Francisco Giants – 2	Pacific Bell Park	2:33	43,704
2	October 1	Florida Marlins – 9, San Francisco Giants – 5	Pacific Bell Park	3:06	43,766
3	October 3	San Francisco Giants – 3, Florida Marlins – 4 (11)	Pro Player Stadium	4:11	61,488
4	October 4	San Francisco Giants – 6, Florida Marlins – 7	Pro Player Stadium	3:19	65,464

This was the second postseason meeting between the Marlins and Giants. They last met in the NLDS in 1997, which was won by the Marlins en route to a World Series title. The Marlins defeated the defending National League champion Giants in four games to advance to the NLCS for the first time since 1997.

Jason Schmidt pitched a complete game for the Giants as he outdueled Florida’s Josh Beckett in a close pitchers’ duel in Game 1. Game 2 was an offensive shootout which saw six pitching changes for each team, and the Marlins would prevail 9–5 to even the series headed to Miami Gardens. In Game 3, the Giants took the lead in the top of the eleventh, but Iván “Pudge” Rodríguez would win the game for the Marlins in the bottom of the inning with a two-run RBI single. In Game 4, the Marlins jumped out to a big lead early, and despite the Giants cutting their lead down to one in the top of the ninth, Rodríguez managed to get the final out at home plate. Game 4 was Barry Bonds’ final postseason game.

== American League Championship Series ==
=== (1) New York Yankees vs. (4) Boston Red Sox ===
New York won the series, 4–3.

Game	Date	Score	Location	Time	Attendance
1	October 8	Boston Red Sox – 5, New York Yankees – 2	Yankee Stadium (I)	3:20	56,281
2	October 9	Boston Red Sox – 2, New York Yankees – 6	Yankee Stadium (I)	3:05	56,295
3	October 11	New York Yankees – 4, Boston Red Sox – 3	Fenway Park	3:09	34,209
4	October 13	New York Yankees – 2, Boston Red Sox – 3	Fenway Park	2:49	34,599
5	October 14	New York Yankees – 4, Boston Red Sox – 2	Fenway Park	3:04	34,619
6	October 15	Boston Red Sox – 9, New York Yankees – 6	Yankee Stadium (I)	3:57	56,277
7	October 16	Boston Red Sox – 5, New York Yankees – 6 (11)	Yankee Stadium (I)	3:56	56,279

This was the second postseason series in the history of the Red Sox–Yankees rivalry. The Yankees prevailed again, this time in seven games, to return to the World Series for the sixth time in eight years.

Tim Wakefield pitched six shutout innings as the Red Sox stole Game 1 on the road. In Game 2, the Red Sox again jumped out to an early lead, but a Nick Johnson two-run homer put the Yankees in the lead for good as they won by four runs to even the series headed to Fenway Park.

Game 3 was notable for the most infamous moment in the history of the rivalry - a bench-clearing brawl occurred in the bottom of the fourth when Manny Ramírez took exception to a high pitch by Roger Clemens and charged the mound. Both benches cleared, and the brawl turned surreal when 72-year-old Yankees bench coach Don Zimmer charged Pedro Martínez. Martínez sidestepped Zimmer, placed his hands on Zimmer's head and propelled Zimmer to the ground. The Zimmer/Martinez altercation ended there as Yankees trainer Gene Monahan and various Yankees players attended to him. The Yankees narrowly held on by a 4–3 score to take a 2–1 series lead.

Wakefield once again stifled the Yankees’ offense in Game 4, pitching seven solid innings as the Red Sox evened the series. In Game 5, the Yankees jumped out to a three run lead early, and Mariano Rivera stopped a late rally by the Red Sox as they won to take a 3–2 series lead headed back to the Bronx. The Red Sox would win in an offensive slugfest in Game 6 to force a seventh game. In Game 7, the Red Sox held a 5–2 lead going into the bottom of the eighth inning and were five outs away from the pennant, however Boston manager Grady Little made a surprising move and decided not to pull Martinez from the mound. This decision proved to be disastrous for the Red Sox, as the Yankees would score three runs in the bottom of the eighth to tie the game at five runs each. The game lasted another two innings until the Yankees prevailed in the bottom of the eleventh thanks to a walk-off solo home run by Aaron Boone. This was the last pennant the Yankees ever won at the original Yankee Stadium.

This was the last time the Yankees defeated the Red Sox in the postseason until 2025. The Red Sox would get revenge the next year, by overcoming a 3–0 series deficit to defeat the Yankees in seven games and win the World Series, ending the Curse of the Bambino.

The Yankees would win their next pennant in 2009 over the Los Angeles Angels of Anaheim in six games en route to a World Series title. As of 2026, this is the last time the Yankees won a Game 7.

== National League Championship Series ==
=== (3) Chicago Cubs vs. (4) Florida Marlins ===
Florida won the series, 4–3.

Game	Date	Score	Location	Time	Attendance
1	October 7	Florida Marlins – 9, Chicago Cubs – 8 (11)	Wrigley Field	3:44	39,567
2	October 8	Florida Marlins – 3, Chicago Cubs – 12	Wrigley Field	3:02	39,562
3	October 10	Chicago Cubs – 5, Florida Marlins – 4 (11)	Pro Player Stadium	4:16	65,115
4	October 11	Chicago Cubs – 8, Florida Marlins – 3	Pro Player Stadium	2:58	65,829
5	October 12	Chicago Cubs – 0, Florida Marlins – 4	Pro Player Stadium	2:42	65,279
6	October 14	Florida Marlins – 8, Chicago Cubs – 3	Wrigley Field	3:00	39,577
7	October 15	Florida Marlins – 9, Chicago Cubs – 6	Wrigley Field	3:11	39,574

This was the first postseason meeting between the Marlins and Cubs. The Marlins overcame a 3–1 series deficit to defeat the Cubs in seven games, returning to the World Series for the first time since 1997 (in the process denying a rematch of the 1938 World Series between the Cubs and Yankees).

In Game 1, the Marlins prevailed in an extra-innings slugfest after trailing 4-0 early thanks to a go-ahead homer by Mike Lowell in the top of the eleventh. In Game 2, Mark Prior pitched seven solid innings and Alex S. Gonzalez homered twice as the Cubs blew out the Marlins to even the series headed to Miami Gardens. Game 3 was the second extra-innings contest, and it would be won by the Cubs as Doug Glanville put them in the lead for good with an RBI triple in the top of the eleventh. Aramis Ramírez set the tone in Game 4 with the Cubs’ first-ever postseason first-inning grand slam as the Cubs blew out the Marlins again to take a 3–1 series lead, now one win away from their first pennant in 58 years. However, the Cubs eventually imploded. Josh Beckett pitched a two-hit complete game shutout in Game 5 as the Marlins won 4-0 to send the series back to Wrigley Field, and little did both teams know it would be the most controversial game in the entire series.

Game 6 was notable for the Steve Bartman incident, which occurred in the top of the eighth with the Cubs five outs away from the pennant. On the eighth pitch of his at bat, Luis Castillo hit a high foul ball toward the left field wall. Cubs left fielder Moisés Alou (a former Marlin) headed toward the stands to catch the ball for the potential second out. As Alou reached for the ball, Cubs fan Steve Bartman, along with others near the area, did the same. The ball bounced off Bartman's hands and into the stands. Though the Cubs pleaded for a call of fan interference, left field umpire Mike Everitt ruled that the ball had left the field of play and was therefore up for grabs. Alou, who was visibly angry at Bartman's catch, initially acknowledged that he would not have made the catch, but he later denied making such a statement and said if he had, it was only to make Bartman feel better. Then, the Cubs imploded as the Marlins put up eight unanswered runs in what turned into a blowout win for them as they forced Game 7.

In Game 7, the Cubs overcame a 3-0 Marlins lead early to take a two-run lead as Moisés Alou hit a two-run homer in the bottom of the third. Then, the Marlins surged again as Derrek Lee hit an RBI single in the top of the fifth to put the Marlins in the lead for good, and they would put up three more insurance runs across the sixth and seventh to secure the pennant.

Due to the Marlins clinching the pennant in Game 7, the Cubs’ loss of their 3–1 series lead entered baseball lore as part of the Curse of the Billy Goat superstition used to explain the Cubs’ pennant drought since 1945 and their championship drought since 1908, with Fox Sports’ Thom Brennaman saying during his coverage near the end of Game 6, "It's safe to say that every Cubs fan has to be wondering right now, is the Curse of the Billy Goat alive and well?". The Cubs returned to the NLCS in 2015, but were swept by the New York Mets. They would eventually earn redemption in 2016, defeating the Los Angeles Dodgers in six games for their long awaited pennant en route to a World Series title.

As of 2026, this is the last time the Marlins won the NL pennant.

== 2003 World Series ==
=== (AL1) New York Yankees vs. (NL4) Florida Marlins ===
Florida won the series, 4–2.

Game	Date	Score	Location	Time	Attendance
1	October 18	Florida Marlins – 3, New York Yankees – 2	Yankee Stadium	3:43	55,769
2	October 19	Florida Marlins – 1, New York Yankees – 6	Yankee Stadium	2:56	55,750
3	October 21	New York Yankees – 6, Florida Marlins – 1	Pro Player Stadium	3:21	65,731
4	October 22	New York Yankees – 3, Florida Marlins – 4 (12)	Pro Player Stadium	4:03	65,934
5	October 23	New York Yankees – 4, Florida Marlins – 6	Pro Player Stadium	3:05	65,975
6	October 25	Florida Marlins – 2, New York Yankees – 0	Yankee Stadium	2:57	55,773

The Yankees had been awarded home-field advantage for this World Series, because the AL won the 2003 All-Star game. MLB had alternated home-field advantage for the World Series between the two leagues prior to this, and the NL would have been due for home-field in 2003 before the change. The Marlins upset the heavily favored Yankees in six games to capture their second championship in franchise history. This was the third straight World Series won by an expansion team.

The Marlins stole Game 1 in the Bronx, handing the Yankees their first home loss in the World Series since 1996. Andy Pettitte pitched eight solid innings as the Yankees answered back in Game 2 to even the series headed to Miami Gardens. Mike Mussina prevailed in a pitchers' duel against Florida's Josh Beckett to win Game 3 for the Yankees and give them a 2–1 lead in the series. However, their lead would not hold. Game 4 was a long and grueling contest that was won by the Marlins, as Álex González got them the win with a walk-off homer in the bottom of the twelfth. The Marlins then prevailed in a Game 5 slugfest to take a 3–2 series lead headed back to the Bronx. Game 5 was the last postseason game ever played at Pro Player Stadium, and remains the most recent World Series game played in Miami to date. In Game 6, Beckett made up for the loss in Game 3 by pitching a five-hit complete-game shutout for the Marlins to secure the title. Game 6 was the last World Series game ever played at the original Yankee Stadium.

The Marlins became the first visiting team to win the World Series at Yankee Stadium since the Los Angeles Dodgers in 1981. They were also the last team to accomplish this feat until the Dodgers did so again in 2024. After the series win, the Marlins entered a long slump in which they would not return to the postseason, let alone win another playoff series, until 2020, and this remains their last postseason appearance outside of the divisional round.

The Yankees would return to the World Series again in 2009, where they defeated the Philadelphia Phillies in six games for their 27th championship.

== Broadcasting ==
This was the first of four years that Division Series games aired across ESPN, ESPN2, and Fox. The rights to selected Division Series games were transferred from ABC Family to ESPN and ESPN2. Fox then aired both League Championship Series and the World Series.
