= José Morban =

Dominican baseball player (born 1979)

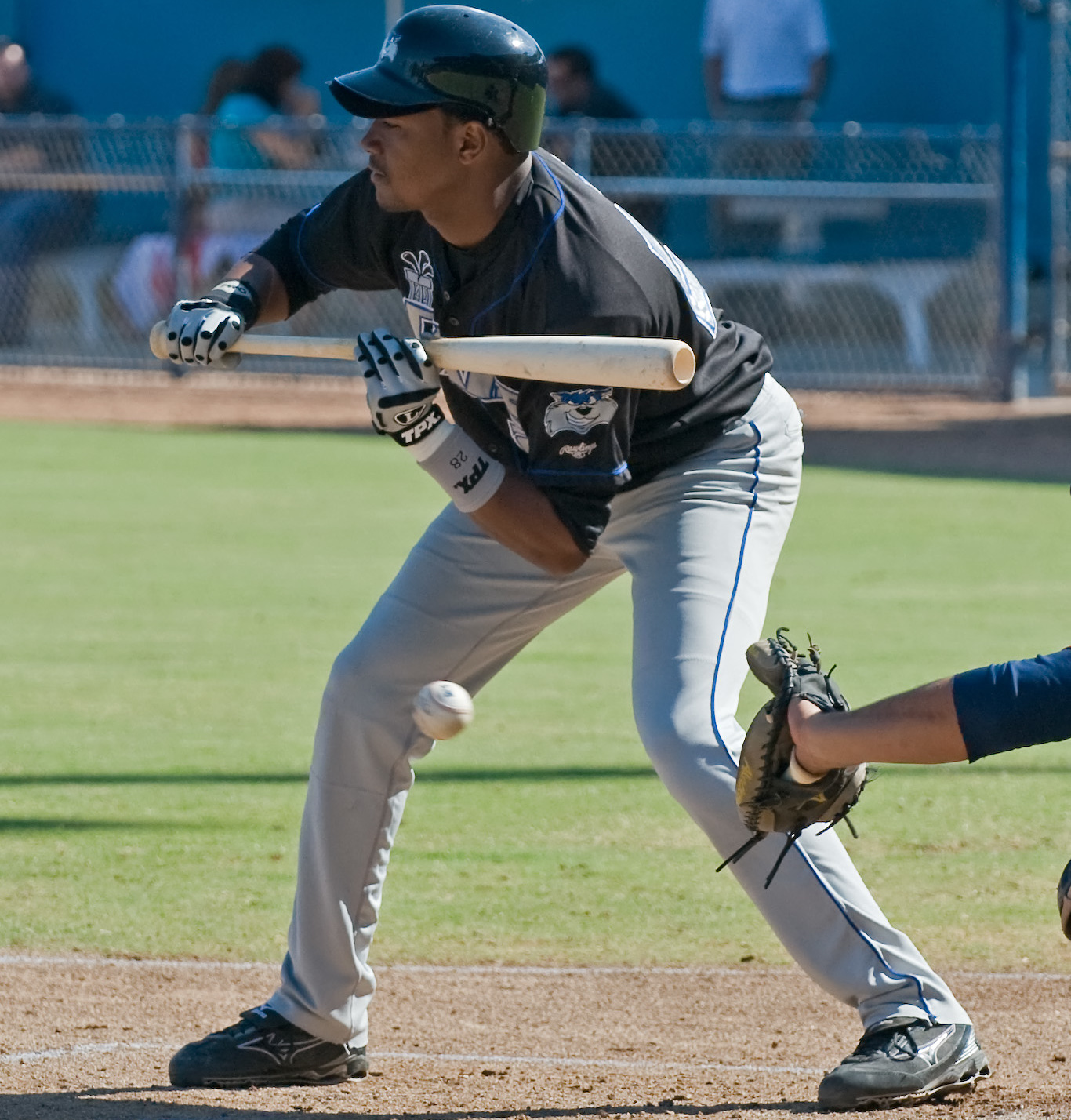
- Morban with the Edmonton Cracker-Cats in 2008
- Infielder
- Born: December 2, 1979 (age 46); San Cristóbal, Dominican Republic
- Batted: Switch Threw: Right

MLB debut
- April 6, 2003, for the Baltimore Orioles

Last MLB appearance
- September 28, 2003, for the Baltimore Orioles

MLB statistics
- Batting average: .141
- Home runs: 2
- Runs batted in: 5
- Stats at Baseball Reference

Teams
- Baltimore Orioles (2003)

José Morban (born December 2, 1979) is a Dominican former professional baseball infielder. He played in Major League Baseball for the Baltimore Orioles during the 2003 season.

== Career ==
In December 2002, the Minnesota Twins chose Morban in the Rule 5 Draft. Morban was previously a member of the Texas Rangers. To accommodate Morban on their roster, the Twins released David Ortiz, who would go on to spend 14 seasons with the Boston Red Sox and be elected to the National Baseball Hall of Fame on his first ballot.

Morban played for the Baltimore Orioles in 2003. Morban played in 61 games and had 10 hits in 71 at-bats.

After playing in only 4 games for the Texas Rangers Triple-A affiliate, the Oklahoma RedHawks in 2007, he played for Águilas Cibaeñas in the Dominican Winter League that offseason.
