= Carlos Méndez (baseball) =

Venezuelan baseball player (born 1974)

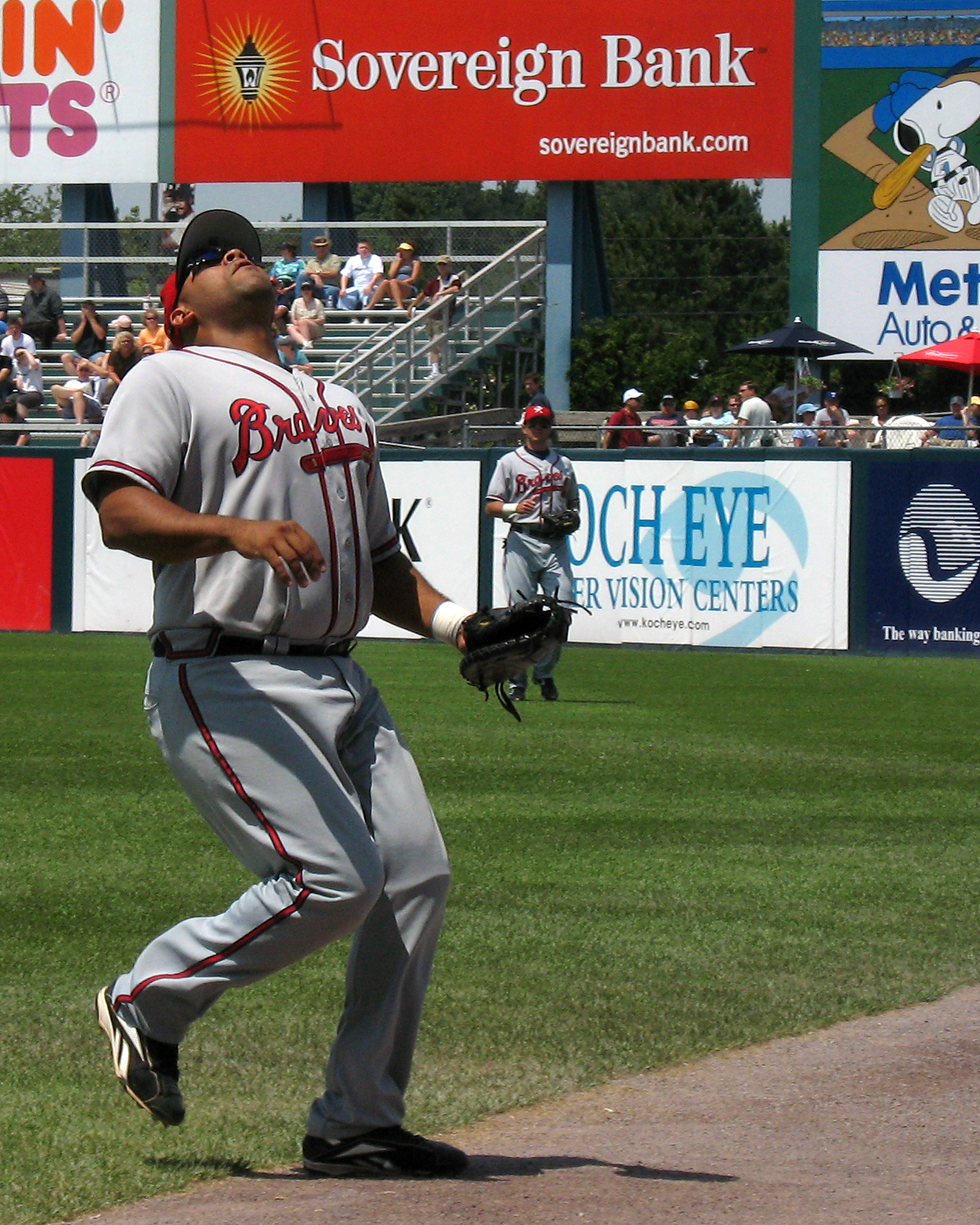
- Carlos Méndez plays for the Richmond Braves in 2007
- First baseman / Coach
- Born: June 18, 1974 (age 51); Caracas, Venezuela
- Batted: Right Threw: Right

MLB debut
- May 22, 2003, for the Baltimore Orioles

Last MLB appearance
- September 28, 2003, for the Baltimore Orioles

MLB statistics
- Batting average: .222
- Home runs: 0
- Runs batted in: 5
- Stats at Baseball Reference

Teams
- As player: Baltimore Orioles (2003); As coach: Atlanta Braves (2025)

Carlos Alberto Méndez Castillo (born June 18, 1974) is a Venezuelan former professional baseball first baseman and coach. He played in Major League Baseball (MLB) for the Baltimore Orioles in 2003.

He served as an assistant hitting coach for the Atlanta Braves in 2025.

== Career ==
=== Atlanta Braves ===
In 26 games, Méndez batted .222 (10-for-45), with five RBI, three runs and three doubles.

Most recently, Méndez played in the Atlanta Braves farm system in 2007, playing 82 games for the Richmond Braves.

On November 22, 2024, Méndez was hired by the Braves to serve as an assistant hitting coach.

=== New York Yankees ===
In 2026, Méndez was named as catching coach of the Tampa Tarpons the Single-A affiliate of the New York Yankees.

== See also ==
- List of Major League Baseball players from Venezuela
