= Travis Harper =

American baseball player (born 1976)

- Pitcher
- Born: May 21, 1976 (age 48); Harrisonburg, Virginia, U.S.
- Batted: Left Threw: Right

MLB debut
- August 4, 2000, for the Tampa Bay Devil Rays

Last MLB appearance
- August 1, 2006, for the Tampa Bay Devil Rays

MLB statistics
- Win–loss record: 22–29
- Earned run average: 4.94
- Strikeouts: 271
- Stats at Baseball Reference

Teams
- Tampa Bay Devil Rays (2000–2006)

Travis Boyd Harper (born May 21, 1976) is a former Major League Baseball player. Harper was a relief pitcher for the Tampa Bay Devil Rays from 2000 to 2006.

== High school and college ==
Travis Harper attended Circleville High School in Pendleton County, West Virginia. He was an all-state basketball and baseball player in high school. Also, he helped lead the Indians to a state title in baseball during his senior season of 1994. He was named the West Virginia Baseball Player of the Yearby the state's Sports Writers Association. During his career at Circleville, Harper was 27-5, had an earned run average of 0.88, surrendered just 68 hits and struck out 407 in 207 innings pitched. He was drafted by the New York Mets in the 14th round of the 1994 draft, but instead chose to attend James Madison University in nearby Harrisonburg, VA on a baseball scholarship. In three seasons at JMU, Harper finished with a 20-10 record and an earned run average of 4.08. Harper graduated with a Health Sciences Degree. He played with the Harrisonburg (VA) Turks of the Valley League during his college summers.

== Professional career ==
Harper was drafted by the Boston Red Sox in the third round of the 1997 amateur draft. He signed with the Red Sox on July 14, 1997. Following a contract dispute with the Red Sox which went to arbitration, he became a free agent on October 29, 1997. He then signed with the Tampa Bay Devil Rays on June 28, 1998. He made his Major League debut on August 4, 2000, against the Baltimore Orioles. Later that season, he tossed a two-hit, complete game shutout against the Toronto Blue Jays. Harper played in seven major league seasons for Tampa Bay. He was released by the Devil Rays on October 31, 2006. Harper had career ending shoulder surgery in 2007. As of 2024, Harper's 240 games pitched remain the most of any pitcher who played exclusively for the Rays during their career.
