= Travis Driskill =

American baseball player (born 1971)

- Pitcher
- Born: August 1, 1971 (age 55); Omaha, Nebraska, U.S.
- Batted: Right Threw: Right

Professional debut
- NPB: April 4, 1998, for the Yakult Swallows
- MLB: April 26, 2002, for the Baltimore Orioles

Last appearance
- NPB: April 29, 1998, for the Yakult Swallows
- MLB: August 28, 2007, for the Houston Astros

MLB statistics
- Win–loss record: 11–14
- Earned run average: 5.23
- Strikeouts: 123

MLB statistics
- Win–loss record: 0–1
- Earned run average: 4.80
- Strikeouts: 7
- Stats at Baseball Reference

Teams
- Yakult Swallows (1998); Baltimore Orioles (2002–2003); Colorado Rockies (2004); Houston Astros (2005, 2007)

Travis Corey Driskill (born August 1, 1971) is an American former professional baseball pitcher. He is 6 feet (1.8 m) tall and weighs 215 pounds (98 kg). He bats and throws right-handed. He attended Texas Tech University, where he played for the Red Raiders, and later became the pitching coach for the Corpus Christi Hooks.

== Career ==
Driskill was drafted in 1990 and 1992 by the Houston Astros and California Angels, respectively, but did not sign. He was drafted again in the fourth round of the 1993 draft by the Cleveland Indians and this time he did sign. Driskill played in the Indians minor league system for the next five years, advancing as high as Triple-A before his contract was purchased by the Yakult Swallows on January 6, 1998. Driskill appeared in seven games as a reliever for the Swallows before he was released and signed back with the Indians in August.

A minor league free agent after the 1999 season, Driskill signed with the Houston Astros, and played the next two seasons in their minor league system. On November 15, 2001, Driskill signed with the Baltimore Orioles. He made his MLB debut with the Orioles in 2002, appearing in 29 games including 19 starts, the most games appeared in for a single season for Driskill's entire major league career. Driskill appeared in 20 more games for the Orioles in 2003 and became a free agent at the end of the season. On November 20, 2003, Driskill signed with the Colorado Rockies. He played only one season in Colorado, appearing in five games.

On November 11, 2004, Driskill signed with the Houston Astros and became a free agent after the 2005 season. On December 9, 2005, he signed with the Tampa Bay Devil Rays, but was released on April 2, 2006; on April 14 he resigned with the Astros. Driskill played the next two seasons for Houston's Triple-A affiliate, the Round Rock Express, except for a callup in August 2007, appearing in two games. Driskill retired after the season and accepted an offer from the Astros to become the pitching coach of their Rookie League team, the Greenville Astros.
