= Eric DuBose =

American baseball player (born 1976)

- Pitcher
- Born: May 15, 1976 (age 49); Bradenton, Florida, U.S.
- Batted: Left Threw: Left

MLB debut
- September 19, 2002, for the Baltimore Orioles

Last MLB appearance
- April 7, 2006, for the Baltimore Orioles

MLB statistics
- Win–loss record: 9–15
- Earned run average: 5.21
- Strikeouts: 115
- Stats at Baseball Reference

Teams
- Baltimore Orioles (2002–2006)
Medals
Men's baseball
Representing United States
World Junior Baseball Championship
Silver medal – second place	1994 Brandon	Team

Eric DuBose (born May 15, 1976) is an American former professional baseball pitcher. He bats and throws left-handed and attended Mississippi State University. Currently, Dubose serves as a Director for East Coast Sox Baseball Organization, an elite nationally known showcase organization based out of the southeast.

After tossing just 6 innings in 4 games in 2002, his first official year, DuBose looked to be a career minor leaguer for good. However, when the Baltimore Orioles needed a spot starter for a game against the Royals in May 2003, they recalled DuBose from Triple-A Ottawa and he did not disappoint, tossing 6 innings of 3-hit, 2-run ball. DuBose spent most of 2003 in the bullpen, though he was made a full-time starter in September. DuBose finished '03 with a 3–6 record and 3.79 ERA in 17 games.

Unfortunately for the Orioles' organization, DuBose took a step back as a full-time starter in 2004, compiling a 6.39 ERA in 14 games while allowing 12 home runs. In 2005 the struggles continued – DuBose was ineffective in 15 games, walking more batters than he struck out. After signing a minor league contract with the Colorado Rockies before the start of the 2007 season, DuBose was released on May 15, 2007.

DuBose signed with the Cleveland Indians in late May 2007, spending the season with the Buffalo Bisons of the International League. For the 2008 season, he played for the independent Bridgeport Bluefish of the Atlantic League before his contract was purchased by the Los Angeles Dodgers on August 3, 2008; he was assigned to Double-A Jacksonville. On August 27, he was promoted to Triple-A Las Vegas and became a free agent at the end of the season.
