= Rodrigo López (baseball) =

Mexican baseball player (born 1975)

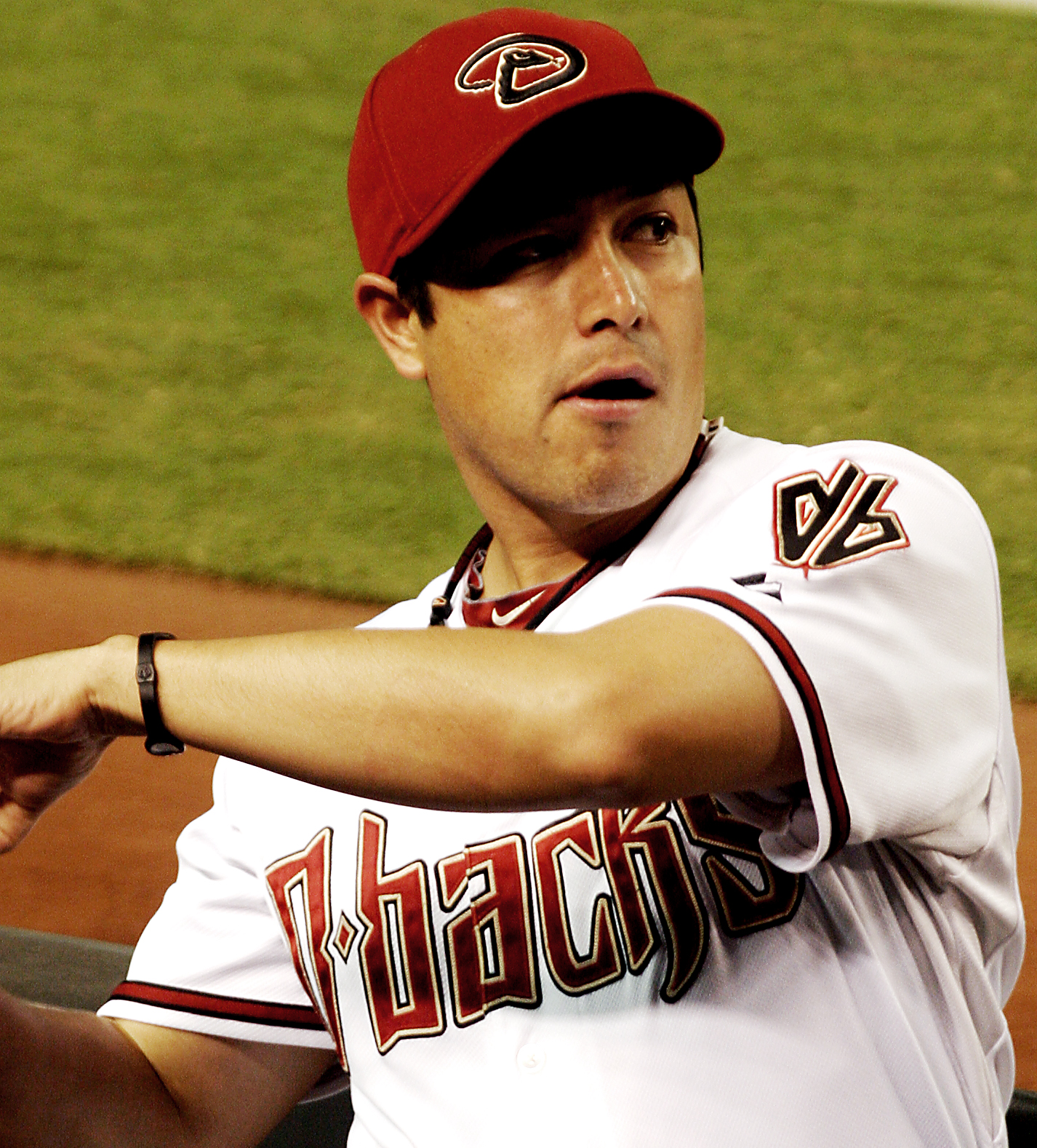
- López with the Arizona Diamondbacks
- Pitcher
- Born: December 14, 1975 (age 50); Tlalnepantla de Baz, Mexico State, Mexico
- Batted: Right Threw: Right

MLB debut
- April 29, 2000, for the San Diego Padres

Last MLB appearance
- April 22, 2012, for the Chicago Cubs

MLB statistics
- Win–loss record: 81–89
- Earned run average: 4.82
- Strikeouts: 865
- Stats at Baseball Reference

Teams
- San Diego Padres (2000); Baltimore Orioles (2002–2006); Colorado Rockies (2007); Philadelphia Phillies (2009); Arizona Diamondbacks (2010); Chicago Cubs (2011–2012)

Rodrigo López Muñoz (born December 14, 1975) is a Mexican former professional baseball pitcher and sportscaster. López was a pitcher in the Mexican League in 1995 when the San Diego Padres of Major League Baseball (MLB) purchased his contract.

== Career ==
=== San Diego Padres ===
He worked his way up to the major leagues with the Padres, when he made his debut on April 29, 2000. López did not appear in the majors in 2001, but spent the entire year with the High Single-A Lake Elsinore Storm and Triple-A Portland Beavers. He became a free agent after the 2001 season.

=== Baltimore Orioles ===
López joined the Baltimore Orioles in 2002 where he went 15–9 and in the process was runner-up for AL Rookie of the Year. 2003 was a disappointment for López, as he went 7–10 in an injury-marred campaign. In 2004, he was moved to middle relief but pitched his way back into the starting rotation. That year, his record was 14–9.

=== Colorado Rockies ===
On January 12, 2007, he was traded to the Colorado Rockies for minor leaguers Jason Burch and Jim Miller. López left a start against the Los Angeles Dodgers on July 26, 2007, in the seventh inning with an elbow injury, and he later underwent Tommy John surgery on August 22, 2007. In 14 starts for the Rockies, López went 5–4 with an ERA of 4.42, with 43 strikeouts. He also went 5–1 with an ERA of 3.63 at Coors Field. After the 2007 season, he became a free agent.

=== Atlanta Braves ===
On August 22, 2008, exactly one year after his surgery, he signed a minor league contract with the Atlanta Braves. The contract included the rest of 2008, and 2009, with a major league option. He started his Braves career by pitching for the Gulf Coast League Braves, before being promoted to Single-A Rome. He was released by the Braves in November 2008.

=== Philadelphia Phillies ===
On March 5, 2009, López signed a minor league contract with the Philadelphia Phillies. He was called up to the Phillies from the Triple-A Lehigh Valley IronPigs on July 3, 2009, and started that night against the New York Mets, allowing two runs in 6 1/3 innings to pick up the win in a 7–2 Phillies victory. It was his first win in the major leagues since he defeated the Phillies on July 7, 2007, as a member of the Colorado Rockies. On September 9, he was released by the Phillies.

=== Arizona Diamondbacks ===
López was signed to a minor league contract by the Arizona Diamondbacks on December 16, 2009. On March 30, 2010, Lopez was named the Diamondbacks' 4th starter after having a productive spring training compiling a 2.35 ERA in 5 games with 4 game starts in 15.1 innings. His regular season was disappointing, however, with an ERA of a flat 5.00 starting in 33 games. He won 7 games, and lost 16.

=== Atlanta Braves ===
On January 31, 2011, López signed a minor league contract with the Atlanta Braves. Atlanta sent him to Triple A at the end of Spring training where he started Opening Day for the Gwinnett Braves.

=== Chicago Cubs ===
He was traded to the Chicago Cubs on May 26, 2011, for Ryan Buchter.

On April 23, 2012, Lopez was designated for assignment to make room on the roster for newly acquired Michael Bowden. After clearing waivers, he was sent back to Triple-A Iowa.

== Broadcasting career ==
On December 6, 2013, the Diamondbacks announced that López was hired to join their Spanish language radio broadcast team as the color analyst alongside play-by-play announcer Oscar Soria.

== Personal life ==
His parents are Isabel and Raúl López, he has a brother named Raúl as his father. They live in Mexico City. He is married to Romy, and the couple have two boys: Rodrigo Jr. (born March 7, 2003) and Raymond (born March 17, 2005).
