= Jorge Julio =

Venezuelan baseball player (born 1979)

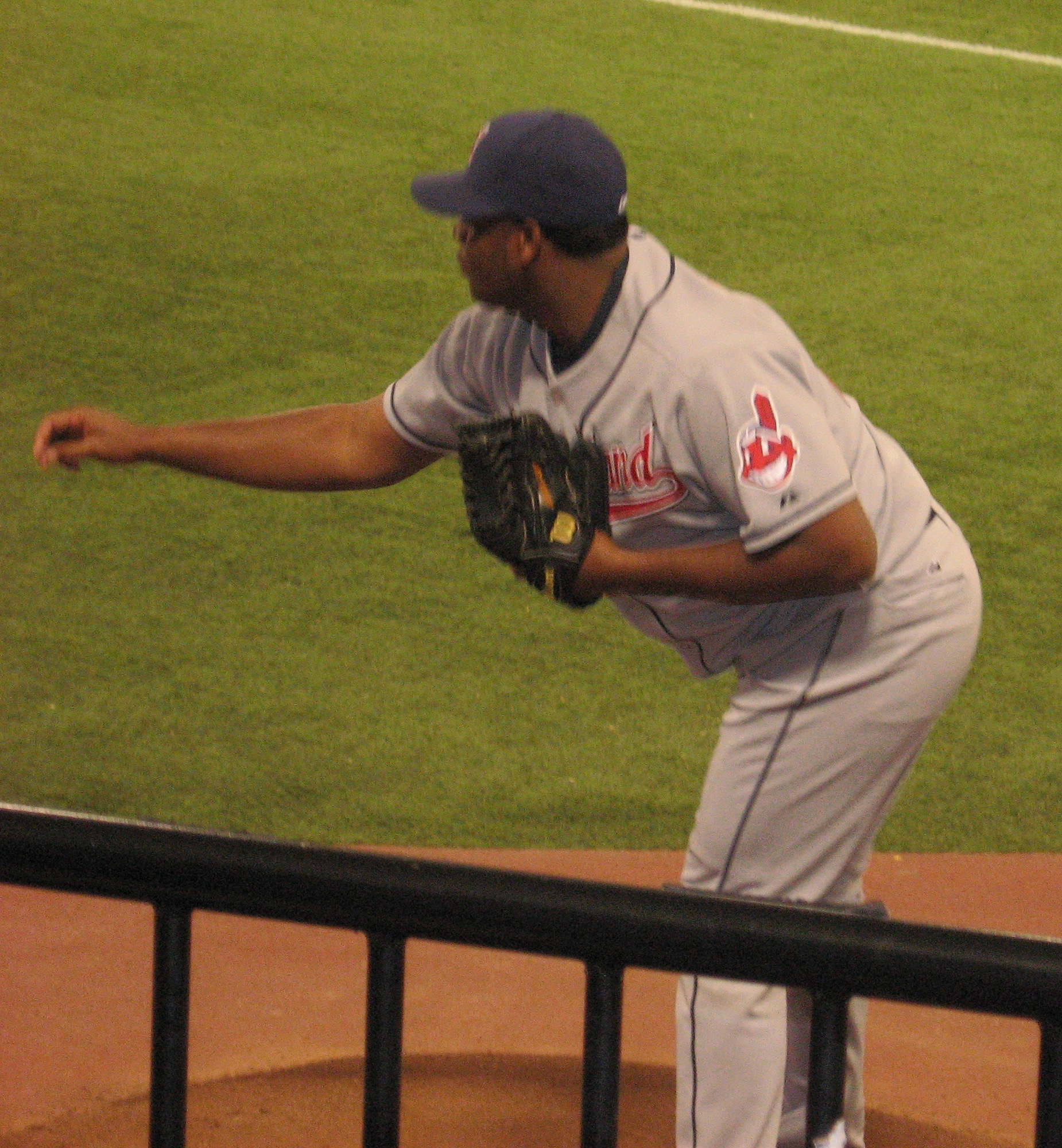
- Julio with the Indians on April 19, 2008
- Pitcher
- Born: March 3, 1979 (age 46); Caracas, Venezuela
- Batted: Right Threw: Right

MLB debut
- April 26, 2001, for the Baltimore Orioles

Last MLB appearance
- June 1, 2009, for the Milwaukee Brewers

MLB statistics
- Win–loss record: 17–34
- Earned run average: 4.43
- Strikeouts: 448
- Saves: 99
- Stats at Baseball Reference

Teams
- Baltimore Orioles (2001–2005); New York Mets (2006); Arizona Diamondbacks (2006); Florida Marlins (2007); Colorado Rockies (2007); Cleveland Indians (2008); Atlanta Braves (2008); Milwaukee Brewers (2009)

Jorge Dandys Julio Tapia (born March 3, 1979) is a Venezuelan former professional baseball relief pitcher. He previously played for the Baltimore Orioles from 2001 to 2005, New York Mets and Arizona Diamondbacks in 2006, and the Florida Marlins in 2007 before being traded to the Rockies for Byung-hyun Kim. He had brief stints with the Cleveland Indians and Atlanta Braves in 2008, and also with the Milwaukee Brewers in 2009. He bats and throws right-handed.

== Career ==
=== Montreal Expos ===
Julio signed with the Montreal Expos on February 14, 1996. He played in their minor league organization until he was traded to the Baltimore Orioles for Ryan Minor on December 22, 2000.

=== Baltimore Orioles ===
Julio's first season in the majors was 2001 with the Orioles, in which he compiled a record of 1 win and 1 loss with a 3.80 ERA in 21.1 innings pitched; however, Julio's first full season in the majors was 2002, in which he went 5–6, posting a 1.99 ERA with 25 saves and 55 strikeouts in 68 innings. He finished third in the American League Rookie of the Year voting with 1 second-place vote and 11 third-place votes. However, he was unable to duplicate his rookie season success in the seasons that followed and eventually lost his job as the Orioles closer to B. J. Ryan at the end of 2004. Julio began 2005 as the set-up man for Ryan. During April of that season, he allowed just one earned run in 12 2/3 innings pitched; despite that, his performance declined and he finished the season 3–5 with a 5.90 ERA in 67 appearances.

=== New York Mets ===
On January 21, 2006, Julio was dealt to the New York Mets with pitching prospect John Maine in exchange for Kris Benson. He began the season in the Mets bullpen, but was traded to the Arizona Diamondbacks on May 24, 2006, for Orlando Hernández.

=== Arizona Diamondbacks ===
Julio was traded to the Arizona Diamondbacks on May 24, 2006, for Orlando Hernández. He replaced José Valverde as the Arizona closer and saved 15 games in 19 opportunities before losing the closer job to Valverde in early September. On March 26, 2007, Julio was traded to the Florida Marlins for Yusmeiro Petit

=== Florida Marlins ===
On March 26, 2007, Julio was traded to the Florida Marlins for Yusmeiro Petit and was named their closer coming out of spring training. But after failing to record a save in three opportunities, he was removed from the closer role in mid-April. On May 12, 2007, in his last outing as a Marlin, he gave up a walk-off grand slam to Ryan Zimmerman of the Washington Nationals. He was traded to the Colorado Rockies for Byung-hyun Kim the following day.

=== Colorado Rockies ===
Julio was traded to the Colorado Rockies for Byung-hyun Kim in May 2007. He pitched in both a middle relief and a set-up role for Colorado, appearing in 58 games and posting an 0–3 record with a 3.93 ERA for the Rockies. He also gave up a two-run homer in the 13th inning to Scott Hairston in the 2007 Wild Card Game Playoff. The Rockies rallied to win the game in the bottom for the 13th. Julio was granted free agency from the Rockies on October 27, 2007. He was granted free agency from the Rockies on October 27, 2007;

=== Cleveland Indians ===
On January 31, 2008, Julio promptly signed a minor-league deal with the Cleveland Indians, and was invited to their spring training camp. His contract was purchased by the team on March 25, 2008, and he was on their opening day roster. However, after 15 generally ineffective relief appearances, he was designated for assignment on May 28, 2008, and was later released on June 2. He posted a 0–0 record and 5.60 ERA in those 15 appearances.

=== Atlanta Braves ===
Shortly after his release, Julio signed a minor league contract with the Atlanta Braves. In the final month of the 2008 season, Julio appeared in 12 games for the Braves, winning three games and posting a 0.73 ERA.

=== Milwaukee Brewers ===
On December 4, 2008, Julio signed a one-year contract with the Milwaukee Brewers. On June 2, 2009, Julio was released by the Brewers, after compiling a 1–1 record and a 7.79 earned run average.

=== Tampa Bay Rays ===
Julio was signed by the Tampa Bay Rays on June 9, 2009, and reported to their Triple-A affiliate Durham Bulls. He was later released on August 7, 2009.

=== Pittsburgh Pirates ===
On August 30, 2009, Julio signed a minor league contract with the Pittsburgh Pirates. In November 2009 he filed for free agency.

=== Bridgeport Bluefish ===
On April 2, 2010, Julio signed a deal to join the independent Bridgeport Bluefish for the 2010 season. Pitching coach Fred Stackson has commented that Julio is gaining consistency with his delivery, especially to right-handed batters. In 55 games 55 innings of relief he went 0-1 with a 1.15 ERA with 57 strikeouts and 28 saves.

In January 2011, he agreed to a contract with the Pittsburgh Pirates, but he did not pitch in 2011. He returned to Bridgeport in 2012. In 19 games 18.2 innings of relief he went 0-1 with a 6.27 ERA with 13 strikeouts and 8 saves.

== Pitching style ==
Julio threw extremely hard, featuring both a four-seam and a two-seam fastball in the 95–100 MPH range - though he has thrown even harder on occasion. He also had a downward-breaking slider, which comes in at between 86 and 90 MPH, and occasionally threw a changeup as well.

== See also ==
- List of Major League Baseball players from Venezuela
