= 2003 Cleveland Indians season =

2003 Cleveland Indians
- League: American League
- Division: Central
- Ballpark: Jacobs Field
- City: Cleveland, Ohio
- Record: 68–94 (.420)
- Divisional place: 4th
- Owners: Larry Dolan
- General managers: Mark Shapiro
- Managers: Eric Wedge
- Television: FSN Ohio; John Sanders, Mike Hegan, Rick Manning
- Radio: WTAM; Tom Hamilton, Matt Underwood, Mike Hegan

The 2003 Cleveland Indians season was the 103rd season for the franchise. The team finished fourth in the American League Central behind the Minnesota Twins, Chicago White Sox and Kansas City Royals.

== Offseason ==
- December 6, 2002: Travis Hafner was traded by the Texas Rangers with Aaron Myette to the Cleveland Indians for Einar Díaz and Ryan Drese.
- December 19, 2002: Jason Bere was signed as a free agent with the Cleveland Indians.
- December 23, 2002: AJ Hinch was signed as a free agent with the Cleveland Indians.
- January 14, 2003: Shane Spencer signed as a free agent with the Cleveland Indians.
- March 29, 2003: AJ Hinch was purchased by the Detroit Tigers from the Cleveland Indians.

== Regular season ==
=== Season standings ===
AL Central
Team	W	L	Pct.	GB	Home	Road
Minnesota Twins	90	72	.556	—	48‍–‍33	42‍–‍39
Chicago White Sox	86	76	.531	4	51‍–‍30	35‍–‍46
Kansas City Royals	83	79	.512	7	40‍–‍40	43‍–‍39
Cleveland Indians	68	94	.420	22	38‍–‍43	30‍–‍51
Detroit Tigers	43	119	.265	47	23‍–‍58	20‍–‍61

=== Record vs. opponents ===
2003 American League record Source: MLB Standings Grid – 2003
Team	ANA	BAL	BOS	CWS	CLE	DET	KC	MIN	NYY	OAK	SEA	TB	TEX	TOR	NL
Anaheim	—	1–8	3–6	3–4	6–3	6–1	6–3	5–4	3–6	8–12	8–11	6–3	9–10	2–7	11–7
Baltimore	8–1	—	9–10	2–4	3–3	3–3	3–4	3–4	6–13–1	2–7	4–5	8–11	7–2	8–11	5–13
Boston	6–3	10–9	—	5–4	4–2	8–1	5–1	2–4	9–10	3–4	5–2	12–7	5–4	10–9	11–7
Chicago	4–3	4–2	4–5	—	11–8	11–8	11–8	9–10	4–2	4–5	2–7	3–3	3–4	6–3	10–8
Cleveland	3–6	3–3	2–4	8–11	—	12–7	6–13	9–10	2–5	3–6	3–6	5–2	4–5	2–4	6–12
Detroit	1–6	3–3	1–8	8–11	7–12	—	5–14	4–15	1–5	3–6	1–8	2–4	1–6	2–7	4–14
Kansas City	3–6	4–3	1–5	8–11	13–6	14–5	—	11–8	2–4	2–7	4–5	4–3	7–2	1–5	9–9
Minnesota	4–5	4–3	4–2	10–9	10–9	15–4	8–11	—	0–7	8–1	3–6	6–0	5–4	3–3	10–8
New York	6–3	13–6–1	10–9	2–4	5–2	5–1	4–2	7–0	—	3–6	5–4	14–5	4–5	10–9	13–5
Oakland	12–8	7–2	4–3	5–4	6–3	6–3	7–2	1–8	6–3	—	7–12	6–3	15–4	5–2	9–9
Seattle	11–8	5–4	2–5	7–2	6–3	8–1	5–4	6–3	4–5	12–7	—	4–5	10–10	3–4	10–8
Tampa Bay	3–6	11–8	7–12	3–3	2–5	4–2	3–4	0–6	5–14	3–6	5–4	—	3–6	11–8	3–15
Texas	10–9	2–7	4–5	4–3	5–4	6–1	2–7	4–5	5–4	4–15	10–10	6–3	—	5–4	4–14
Toronto	7–2	11–8	9–10	3–6	4–2	7–2	5–1	3–3	9–10	2–5	4–3	8–11	4–5	—	10–8

=== Notable transactions ===
- June 3, 2003: Kevin Kouzmanoff was drafted by the Cleveland Indians in the 6th round of the 2003 amateur draft. Player signed June 3, 2003.
- July 18, 2003: Shane Spencer was traded by the Cleveland Indians with Ricardo Rodríguez to the Texas Rangers for Ryan Ludwick.

=== Roster ===
2003 Cleveland Indians
**Roster**
**Pitchers**: 31 Brian Anderson; 55 Danys Báez; 46 Jason Bere; 63 Rafael Betancourt; 36 Nick Bierbrodt; 57 Jason Boyd; 47 David Cortés; 27 Jack Cressend; 50 Jason Davis; 49 Chad Durbin; 49 Dave Elder; 59 Alex Herrera; 34 Cliff Lee; 47 David Lee; 34 Dan Miceli; 45 Terry Mulholland; 38 Aaron Myette; 16 Chad Paronto; 59 Jason Phillips; 51 Jerrod Riggan; 54 David Riske; 56 Ricardo Rodríguez; 52 CC Sabathia; 53 Carl Sadler; 48 José Santiago; 61 Jason Stanford; 30 Brian Tallet; 40 Billy Traber; 37 Jake Westbrook	**Catchers**: 44 Josh Bard; 15 Tim Laker; 20 Víctor Martínez; **Infielders**: 1 Casey Blake; 28 Ben Broussard; 12 Ricky Gutiérrez; 32 Travis Hafner; 62 Greg LaRocca; 8 John McDonald; 60 Jhonny Peralta; 7 Brandon Phillips; 56 Ángel Santos; 36 Bill Selby; 2 Zach Sorensen; 13 Omar Vizquel	**Outfielders**: 24 Milton Bradley; 23 Ellis Burks; 10 Coco Crisp; 6 Alex Escobar; 20 Karim García; 9 Jody Gerut; 11 Matt Lawton; 38 Ryan Ludwick; 30 Chris Magruder; 47 Shane Spencer	**Manager**: 22 Eric Wedge; **Coaches**: 25 Buddy Bell (bench); 57 Carl Willis (pitching); 29 Jeff Datz (first base); 4 Luis Isaac (bullpen); 33 Eddie Murray (hitting); 35 Joel Skinner (third base)

=== Game log ===
2003 Game Log: 68–94 (Home: 38–43; Away: 30–51)
March: 0–1 (Home: 0–0; Away: 0–1)

#	Date	Opponent	Score	Win	Loss	Save	Stadium	Attendance	Record	Streak
1	March 31	@ Orioles	5–6 (13)	Ryan (1–0)	**Westbrook** (0–1)	—	Oriole Park at Camden Yards	46,257	0–1	L1

April: 7–19 (Home: 3–9; Away: 4–10)

#	Date	Opponent	Score	Win	Loss	Save	Stadium	Attendance	Record	Streak
2	April 2	@ Orioles	4–2	**Rodríguez** (1–0)	Daal (0–1)	**Báez** (1)	Oriole Park at Camden Yards	27,658	1–1	W1
3	April 3	@ Orioles	3–0	**Anderson** (1–0)	Helling (0–1)	**Báez** (2)	Oriole Park at Camden Yards	18,470	2–1	W2
4	April 4	@ Royals	1–5	George (1–0)	**Davis** (0–1)	—	Kauffman Stadium	15,241	2–2	L1
5	April 5	@ Royals	1–3	Hernandez (2–0)	**Sabathia** (0–1)	MacDougal (3)	Kauffman Stadium	19,912	2–3	L2
–	April 6	@ Royals	Postponed (rain, makeup June 30)							
–	April 7	White Sox	Postponed (snow, makeup April 8)							
6	April 8	White Sox	3–5 (10)	Koch (1–0)	**Paronto** (0–1)	—	**Jacobs Field**	42,301	2–4	L3
7	April 9	White Sox	5–2	**Anderson** (2–0)	Garland (0–1)	**Báez** (3)	**Jacobs Field**	14,841	3–4	W1
8	April 10	White Sox	2–7	Buehrle (2–1)	**Davis** (0–2)	—	**Jacobs Field**	15,916	3–5	L1
9	April 11	Royals	0–1	Hernandez (3–0)	**Westbrook** (0–2)	MacDougal (6)	**Jacobs Field**	17,931	3–6	L2
10	April 12	Royals	2–5	George (2–0)	**Sabathia** (0–2)	Carrasco (1)	**Jacobs Field**	18,168	3–7	L3
11	April 13	Royals	6–1	**Rodríguez** (2–0)	May (0–1)	—	**Jacobs Field**	19,335	4–7	W1
12	April 14	Royals	4–12	Affeldt (2–0)	**Anderson** (2–1)	—	**Jacobs Field**	15,875	4–8	L1
13	April 15	Orioles	8–3	**Davis** (1–2)	Daal (0–2)	—	**Jacobs Field**	17,015	5–8	W1
14	April 16	Orioles	3–4	Groom (1–0)	**Báez** (0–1)	Julio (2)	**Jacobs Field**	15,674	5–9	L1
15	April 17	Orioles	4–6 (12)	Roberts (1–1)	**Paronto** (0–2)	Julio (3)	**Jacobs Field**	17,368	5–10	L2
16	April 18	@ White Sox	3–5	Colon (2–0)	**Traber** (0–1)	—	U.S. Cellular Field	13,015	5–11	L3
17	April 19	@ White Sox	3–12	Stewart (1–1)	**Anderson** (2–2)	—	U.S. Cellular Field	18,907	5–12	L4
18	April 20	@ White Sox	7–4	**Davis** (2–2)	Buehrle (2–2)	—	U.S. Cellular Field	14,975	6–12	W1
19	April 21	@ White Sox	9–2	**Westbrook** (1–2)	Garland (0–2)	—	U.S. Cellular Field	15,424	7–12	W2
20	April 22	@ Mariners	5–8	Carrara (1–0)	**Báez** (0–2)	—	Safeco Field	25,231	7–13	L1
21	April 23	@ Mariners	0–4	Meche (2–1)	**Rodríguez** (2–1)	—	Safeco Field	26,036	7–14	L2
22	April 24	@ Mariners	2–4	Moyer (3–1)	**Traber** (0–2)	Nelson (1)	Safeco Field	26,263	7–15	L3
23	April 25	@ Athletics	2–5	Lilly (2–0)	**Davis** (2–3)	Foulke (5)	Network Associates Coliseum	11,178	7–16	L4
24	April 26	@ Athletics	3–6	Bradford (2–2)	**Mulholland** (0–1)	Foulke (6)	Network Associates Coliseum	36,346	7–17	L5
25	April 27	@ Athletics	3–4	Rincon (2–1)	**Báez** (0–3)	—	Network Associates Coliseum	26,414	7–16	L6
26	April 29	Angels	1–10	Ortiz (4–2)	**Rodríguez** (2–2)	—	**Jacobs Field**	16,667	7–19	L7
27	April 30	Angels	2–6	Washburn (2–3)	**Anderson** (2–3)	—	**Jacobs Field**	15,761	7–20	L8

May: 14–12 (Home: 9–5; Away: 5–7)

#	Date	Opponent	Score	Win	Loss	Save	Stadium	Attendance	Record	Streak
–	May 1	Angels	Postponed (rain, makeup August 9)							
28	May 2	Rangers	6–5	**Elder** (1–0)	Cordero (1–3)	**Báez** (4)	**Jacobs Field**	19,823	8–20	W1
29	May 3	Rangers	5–6	Powell (1–0)	**Santiago** (0–1)	Urbina (9)	**Jacobs Field**	23,030	8–21	L1
30	May 4	Rangers	3–1	**Sabathia** (1–2)	Thomson (2–3)	**Báez** (5)	**Jacobs Field**	20,866	9–21	W1
31	May 6	@ Angels	1–6	Washburn (3–3)	**Rodríguez** (2–3)	—	Edison International Field of Anaheim	25,043	9–22	L1
32	May 7	@ Angels	5–6	Shields (2–1)	**Elder** (1–1)	Percival (4)	Edison International Field of Anaheim	24,063	9–23	L2
33	May 8	@ Angels	1–7	Appier (2–2)	**Davis** (2–4)	—	Edison International Field of Anaheim	27,957	9–24	L3
34	May 9	@ Rangers	9–5	**Westbrook** (2–2)	Thomson (2–4)	—	The Ballpark in Arlington	25,106	10–24	W1
35	May 10	@ Rangers	6–4	**Sabathia** (2–2)	Benes (0–1)	**Báez** (6)	The Ballpark in Arlington	43,484	11–24	W2
36	May 11	@ Rangers	10–17	Benoit (1–0)	**Rodríguez** (2–4)	—	The Ballpark in Arlington	23,407	11–25	L1
37	May 13	Mariners	3–8	Pineiro (3–3)	**Anderson** (2–4)	—	**Jacobs Field**	16,721	11–26	L2
38	May 14	Mariners	7–2	**Davis** (3–4)	Garcia (3–5)	—	**Jacobs Field**	17,324	12–26	W1
39	May 15	Mariners	1–9	Carrara (2–0)	**Westbrook** (2–3)	—	**Jacobs Field**	17,889	12–27	L1
40	May 16	Athletics	3–2	**Traber** (1–2)	Mulder (6–2)	**Báez** (7)	**Jacobs Field**	22,357	13–27	W1
41	May 17	Athletics	4–2	**Mulholland** (1–1)	Rincon (2–3)	**Báez** (8)	**Jacobs Field**	23,958	14–27	W2
42	May 18	Athletics	5–8	Foulke (2–0)	**Báez** (0–4)	—	**Jacobs Field**	25,421	14–28	L1
43	May 19	Tigers	10–9	**Traber** (2–2)	Walker (1–1)	**Riske** (1)	**Jacobs Field**	16,492	15–28	W1
44	May 20	Tigers	6–4	**Riske** (1–0)	Roney (0–1)	—	**Jacobs Field**	15,499	16–28	W2
45	May 21	Tigers	4–0	**Sabathia** (3–2)	Bonderman (2–7)	—	**Jacobs Field**	16,534	17–28	W3
46	May 22	Tigers	2–3 (11)	German (2–2)	**Phillips** (0–1)	Sparks (2)	**Jacobs Field**	18,347	17–29	L1
47	May 23	@ Red Sox	2–9	Lowe (4–3)	**Rodríguez** (2–5)	—	Fenway Park	32,673	17–30	L2
48	May 24	@ Red Sox	3–12	Burkett (3–2)	**Anderson** (2–5)	—	Fenway Park	32,643	17–31	L3
49	May 25	@ Red Sox	6–4	**Davis** (4–4)	Fossum (4–3)	**Báez** (9)	Fenway Park	34,318	18–31	W1
50	May 26	@ Tigers	5–6	Avery (2–0)	**Boyd** (0–1)	German (2)	Comerica Park	17,619	18–32	L1
51	May 27	@ Tigers	5–2	**Miceli** (1–2)	Walker (1–2)	**Báez** (10)	Comerica Park	10,844	19–32	W1
52	May 28	@ Tigers	8–2	**Rodríguez** (3–5)	Maroth (1–10)	—	Comerica Park	17,388	20–32	W2
53	May 30	White Sox	7–3	**Sabathia** (4–2)	Wright (0–3)	—	**Jacobs Field**	24,666	21–32	W3
–	May 31	White Sox	Postponed (rain, makeup July 12)							

June: 13–15 (Home: 6–8; Away: 7–7)

#	Date	Opponent	Score	Win	Loss	Save	Stadium	Attendance	Record	Streak
54	June 1	White Sox	5–4 (10)	**Boyd** (1–1)	Koch (1–2)	—	**Jacobs Field**	22,681	22–32	W4
55	June 2	White Sox	5–2	**Anderson** (3–5)	Colon (5–5)	**Báez** (11)	**Jacobs Field**	20,892	23–32	W5
56	June 3	@ Rockies	3–7	Elarton (2–1)	**Rodríguez** (3–6)	—	Coors Field	22,326	23–33	L1
56	June 4	@ Rockies	1–2	Oliver (3–4)	**Traber** (2–3)	Jimenez (13)	Coors Field	22,222	23–34	L2
56	June 5	@ Rockies	4–7	Jennings (4–5)	**Sabathia** (4–3)	Jimenez (14)	Coors Field	25,221	23–35	L3
59	June 6	@ Diamondbacks	6–3	**Davis** (5–4)	González (1–1)	**Báez** (12)	Bank One Ballpark	32,430	24–35	W1
60	June 7	@ Diamondbacks	3–5	Randolph (1–0)	**Anderson** (3–6)	Valverde (2)	Bank One Ballpark	36,619	24–36	L1
61	June 8	@ Diamondbacks	3–13	Webb (3–1)	**Rodríguez** (3–7)	—	Bank One Ballpark	42,956	24–37	L2
62	June 10	Padres	8–5	**Westbrook** (3–3)	Tollberg (0–2)	**Báez** (13)	**Jacobs Field**	19,949	25–37	W1
63	June 11	Padres	3–2	**Sabathia** (5–3)	Eaton (2–5)	**Báez** (14)	**Jacobs Field**	17,427	26–37	W2
64	June 12	Padres	4–9	Peavy (5–5)	**Davis** (5–5)	—	**Jacobs Field**	17,983	26–38	L1
65	June 13	Dodgers	3–4 (10)	Quantrill (1–2)	**Westbrook** (3–4)	Gagne (25)	**Jacobs Field**	23,401	26–39	L2
66	June 14	Dodgers	2–5	Ashby (1–4)	**Tallet** (0–1)	Alvarez (1)	**Jacobs Field**	25,426	26–40	L3
67	June 15	Dodgers	3–4	Nomo (7–6)	**Traber** (2–4)	Gagne (26)	**Jacobs Field**	26,786	26–41	L4
68	June 17	@ Tigers	7–4	**Sabathia** (6–3)	Bernero (1–9)	**Báez** (15)	Comerica Park	13,908	27–41	W1
69	June 18	@ Tigers	4–1	**Davis** (6–5)	Bonderman (2–10)	—	Comerica Park	16,278	28–41	W2
70	June 19	@ Tigers	10–3	**Anderson** (4–6)	Cornejo (3–5)	—	Comerica Park	19,098	29–41	W3
71	June 20	@ Pirates	4–5 (15)	Torres (5–2)	**Báez** (0–5)	—	PNC Park	26,305	29–42	L1
72	June 21	@ Pirates	6–7 (15)	Sauerbeck (2–4)	**Miceli** (1–3)	—	PNC Park	36,856	29–43	L2
73	June 22	@ Pirates	8–5	**Sabathia** (7–3)	Vogelsong (0–1)	**Báez** (16)	PNC Park	37,803	30–43	W1
74	June 24	Royals	1–3	George (9–4)	**Davis** (6–6)	MacDougal (17)	**Jacobs Field**	19,638	30–44	L1
75	June 25	Royals	1–3 (10)	Gilfillan (2–0)	**Riske** (1–1)	MacDougal (18)	**Jacobs Field**	18,527	30–45	L2
76	June 26	Royals	1–4	Lima (2–0)	**Rodríguez** (3–8)	MacDougal (19)	**Jacobs Field**	17,494	30–46	L3
77	June 27	Reds	3–0	**Traber** (3–4)	Graves (3–7)	**Báez** (17)	**Jacobs Field**	29,233	31–46	W1
78	June 28	Reds	4–5	Reitsma (7–2)	**Báez** (0–6)	Williamson (18)	**Jacobs Field**	31,924	31–47	L1
79	June 29	Reds	3–1	**Davis** (7–6)	Haynes (1–7)	**Báez** (18)	**Jacobs Field**	28,433	32–47	W1
80	June 30 (1)	@ Royals	10–5	**Lee** (1–0)	Voyles (0–1)	—	Kauffman Stadium	N/A	33–47	W2
81	June 30 (2)	@ Royals	8–5	**Anderson** (5–6)	Walrond (0–2)	**Báez** (19)	Kauffman Stadium	14,645	34–47	W3

July: 11–16 (Home: 7–5; Away: 4–11)

#	Date	Opponent	Score	Win	Loss	Save	Stadium	Attendance	Record	Streak
82	July 1	@ Royals	3–6	Lima (3–0)	**Rodríguez** (3–9)	MacDougal (21)	Kauffman Stadium	12,831	34–48	L1
83	July 2	@ Royals	2–8	May (2–4)	**Traber** (3–5)	—	Kauffman Stadium	12,918	34–49	L2
84	July 3	@ Twins	4–1	**Sabathia** (8–3)	Rogers (7–4)	—	Hubert H. Humphrey Metrodome	15,064	35–49	W1
85	July 4	@ Twins	2–9	Reed (4–8)	**Davis** (7–7)	—	Hubert H. Humphrey Metrodome	21,328	35–50	L1
86	July 5	@ Twins	13–2	**Anderson** (6–6)	Mays (8–6)	—	Hubert H. Humphrey Metrodome	20,273	36–50	W1
87	July 6	@ Twins	5–3 (10)	**Riske** (2–1)	Guardado (1–4)	**Báez** (20)	Hubert H. Humphrey Metrodome	20,549	37–50	W2
88	July 8	Yankees	4–0	**Traber** (4–5)	Weaver (4–7)	—	**Jacobs Field**	26,540	38–50	W3
89	July 9	Yankees	2–6	Wells (11–3)	**Sabathia** (8–4)	—	**Jacobs Field**	25,058	38–51	L1
90	July 10	Yankees	3–2 (10)	**Boyd** (2–1)	Hitchcock (0–2)	—	**Jacobs Field**	30,167	39–51	W1
91	July 11	White Sox	12–5	**Anderson** (7–6)	Wright (0–4)	—	**Jacobs Field**	27,712	40–51	W2
92	July 12 (1)	White Sox	4–7 (10)	Marte (3–1)	**Mulholland** (1–2)	Gordon (2)	**Jacobs Field**	24,163	40–52	L1
93	July 12 (2)	White Sox	4–2	**Westbrook** (4–4)	Porzio (0–1)	**Báez** (21)	**Jacobs Field**	27,165	41–52	W1
94	July 13	White Sox	4–7	Marte (4–1)	**Betancourt** (0–1)	Gordon (3)	**Jacobs Field**	26,467	41–53	L1
–	July 15	74nd All-Star Game	National League vs. American League (U.S. Cellular Field, Chicago, Illinois)							
95	July 17	@ Yankees	4–5	Rivera (4–0)	**Riske** (2–2)	—	Yankee Stadium	46,401	41–54	L2
96	July 18	@ Yankees	4–10	Clemens (9–6)	**Anderson** (7–7)	—	Yankee Stadium	47,341	41–55	L3
97	July 19	@ Yankees	4–7	Wells (12–3)	**Sabathia** (8–5)	Rivera (17)	Yankee Stadium	54,981	41–56	L4
98	July 20	@ Yankees	4–7	Mussina (11–6)	**Westbrook** (4–5)	Rivera (18)	Yankee Stadium	51,891	41–57	L5
99	July 21	@ White Sox	3–4	Porzio (1–1)	**Tallet** (0–2)	Gordon (5)	U.S. Cellular Field	31,776	41–58	L6
100	July 22	@ White Sox	2–5	Colon (7–9)	**Davis** (7–8)	Marte (6)	U.S. Cellular Field	20,667	41–59	L7
101	July 23	Tigers	4–1	**Anderson** (8–7)	Roney (1–5)	**Báez** (22)	**Jacobs Field**	21,202	42–59	W1
102	July 24	Tigers	4–7	Cornejo (5–8)	**Sabathia** (8–6)	Mears (5)	**Jacobs Field**	20,857	42–60	L1
103	July 25	Twins	5–6	Hawkins (8–2)	**Báez** (0–7)	Guardado (24)	**Jacobs Field**	23,444	42–61	L2
104	July 26	Twins	9–2	**Traber** (5–5)	Lohse (6–9)	—	**Jacobs Field**	25,077	43–61	W1
105	July 27	Twins	3–2 (14)	**Betancourt** (1–1)	Rincon (2–4)	—	**Jacobs Field**	24,318	44–61	W2
106	July 29	@ Athletics	2–6	Mulder (14–7)	**Anderson** (8–8)	Foulke (27)	Network Associates Coliseum	19,260	44–62	L1
107	July 30	@ Athletics	4–2	**Sabathia** (9–6)	Lilly (6–9)	**Báez** (23)	Network Associates Coliseum	29,792	45–62	W1
108	July 31	@ Athletics	1–3	Harden (2–0)	**Westbrook** (4–6)	Foulke (28)	Network Associates Coliseum	25,011	45–63	L1

August: 16–13 (Home: 10–9; Away: 6–4)

#	Date	Opponent	Score	Win	Loss	Save	Stadium	Attendance	Record	Streak
109	August 1	@ Rangers	3–10	Thomson (9–10)	**Traber** (5–6)	—	The Ballpark in Arlington	24,143	45–64	L2
110	August 2	@ Rangers	7–9	Ramirez (3–0)	**Stanford** (0–1)	Cordero (4)	The Ballpark in Arlington	49,290	45–65	L3
111	August 3	@ Rangers	5–8	Dickey (5–5)	**Anderson** (8–9)	Cordero (5)	The Ballpark in Arlington	19,133	45–66	L4
112	August 5	Mariners	1–2	Moyer (15–5)	**Sabathia** (9–7)	Hasegawa (8)	**Jacobs Field**	22,300	45–67	L5
113	August 6	Mariners	10–6	**Westbrook** (5–6)	Pineiro (13–6)	—	**Jacobs Field**	23,282	46–67	W1
114	August 7	Mariners	3–0	**Traber** (6–6)	Garcia (9–12)	**Báez** (24)	**Jacobs Field**	21,141	47–67	W2
115	August 8	Angels	2–5	Washburn (9–11)	**Davis** (7–9)	—	**Jacobs Field**	26,175	47–68	L1
116	August 9 (1)	Angels	3–2 (13)	**Cressend** (1–0)	Weber (2–1)	—	**Jacobs Field**	26,391	48–68	W1
117	August 9 (2)	Angels	3–2	**Boyd** (3–1)	Shields (2–3)	**Báez** (25)	**Jacobs Field**	20,116	49–68	W2
118	August 10	Angels	3–1	**Sabathia** (10–7)	Lackey (7–11)	**Betancourt** (1)	**Jacobs Field**	23,576	50–68	W3
119	August 11	@ Twins	3–5	Lohse (9–9)	**Westbrook** (5–7)	Hawkins (1)	Hubert H. Humphrey Metrodome	23,291	50–69	L1
120	August 12	@ Twins	9–6	**Betancourt** (2–1)	Baldwin (0–1)	—	Hubert H. Humphrey Metrodome	25,834	51–69	W1
121	August 13	@ Twins	5–0 (14)	**Mulholland** (2–2)	Rincon (3–5)	—	Hubert H. Humphrey Metrodome	30,082	52–69	W2
122	August 14	@ Twins	8–3	**Anderson** (9–9)	Radke (8–10)	—	Hubert H. Humphrey Metrodome	24,273	53–69	W3
123	August 15	Devil Rays	1–0	**Sabathia** (11–7)	Harper (2–7)	—	**Jacobs Field**	19,679	54–69	W4
124	August 16	Devil Rays	3–5	Malaska (2–1)	**Lee** (1–1)	Carter (21)	**Jacobs Field**	23,397	54–70	L1
125	August 17	Devil Rays	5–4 (12)	**Mulholland** (3–2)	Colome (3–6)	—	**Jacobs Field**	21,097	55–70	W1
126	August 18	Devil Rays	4–7 (13)	Carter (7–3)	**Mulholland** (3–3)	—	**Jacobs Field**	18,685	55–71	L1
127	August 19	Twins	2–8	Santana (7–3)	**Davis** (7–10)	—	**Jacobs Field**	21,239	55–72	L2
128	August 20	Twins	3–4	Radke (9–10)	**Anderson** (9–10)	Guardado (28)	**Jacobs Field**	20,197	55–73	L3
129	August 22	@ Devil Rays	8–3	**Lee** (2–1)	Kennedy (3–10)	—	Tropicana Field	11,979	56–73	W1
130	August 23	@ Devil Rays	7–5	**Sabathia** (12–7)	Backe (1–1)	**Riske** (2)	Tropicana Field	18,805	57–73	W2
131	August 24	@ Devil Rays	7–5	**Westbrook** (6–7)	Gonzalez (6–6)	**Riske** (3)	Tropicana Field	14,507	58–73	W3
132	August 26	Tigers	4–5	Cornejo (6–13)	**Traber** (6–7)	Walker (3)	**Jacobs Field**	16,972	58–74	L1
133	August 27	Tigers	9–7	**Cressend** (2–0)	Spurling (1–3)	**Riske** (4)	**Jacobs Field**	16,457	59–74	W1
134	August 28	Tigers	8–3	**Lee** (3–1)	Bonderman (6–18)	—	**Jacobs Field**	16,282	60–74	W2
135	August 29	Blue Jays	3–7	Escobar (10–8)	**Sabathia** (12–8)	—	**Jacobs Field**	21,008	60–75	L1
136	August 30	Blue Jays	3–9	Lidle (12–11)	**Westbrook** (6–8)	Towers (1)	**Jacobs Field**	21,806	60–76	L2
137	August 31	Blue Jays	5–4	**Báez** (1–7)	Kershner (0–3)	—	**Jacobs Field**	20,866	61–76	W1

September: 7–18 (Home: 3–7; Away: 4–11)

#	Date	Opponent	Score	Win	Loss	Save	Stadium	Attendance	Record	Streak
138	September 1	@ Tigers	7–4	**Santiago** (1–1)	Walker (3–3)	**Riske** (5)	Comerica Park	10,986	62–76	W2
139	September 2	@ Tigers	6–8	Schmack (1–0)	**Durbin** (0–1)	Rodney (1)	Comerica Park	9,318	62–77	L1
140	September 3	@ Tigers	5–6 (11)	Walker (4–3)	**Santiago** (1–2)	—	Comerica Park	10,234	62–78	L2
141	September 4	@ Tigers	1–2	Knotts (3–5)	**Westbrook** (6–9)	Patterson (3)	Comerica Park	11,371	62–79	L3
142	September 5	@ White Sox	3–5	Garland (11–10)	**Traber** (6–8)	Gordon (9)	U.S. Cellular Field	27,196	62–80	L4
143	September 6	@ White Sox	5–8	Loaiza (19–6)	**Cressend** (2–1)	Gordon (10)	U.S. Cellular Field	24,796	62–81	L5
144	September 7	@ White Sox	3–7	Schoeneweis (3–2)	**Báez** (1–8)	—	U.S. Cellular Field	19,999	62–82	L6
145	September 9	@ Royals	7–1	**Davis** (8–10)	Gobble (3–4)	—	Kauffman Stadium	12,389	63–82	W1
146	September 10	@ Royals	7–9	Wilson (6–3)	**Santiago** (1–3)	Affeldt (4)	Kauffman Stadium	21,581	63–83	L1
147	September 11	@ Royals	6–5	**Báez** (2–8)	Grimsley (2–6)	**Riske** (6)	Kauffman Stadium	13,188	64–83	W1
148	September 12	Twins	4–3	**Sabathia** (13–8)	Rogers (11–8)	**Riske** (7)	**Jacobs Field**	20,679	65–83	W2
149	September 13	Twins	0–2	Lohse (13–11)	**Stanford** (0–2)	Guardado (35)	**Jacobs Field**	20,440	65–84	L1
150	September 14	Twins	3–5	Rincon (5–6)	**Báez** (2–9)	Guardado (36)	**Jacobs Field**	19,452	65–85	L2
151	September 15	Twins	6–13	Santana (11–3)	**Davis** (8–11)	—	**Jacobs Field**	16,967	65–86	L3
152	September 16	Royals	8–12	May (9–7)	**Traber** (6–9)	—	**Jacobs Field**	16,145	65–87	L4
153	September 17	Royals	9–1	**Westbrook** (7–9)	Abbott (1–2)	—	**Jacobs Field**	16,363	66–87	W1
154	September 18	Royals	2–3	Lima (8–1)	**Sabathia** (13–9)	Leskanic (2)	**Jacobs Field**	17,275	66–88	L1
155	September 19	Red Sox	0–2	Burkett (11–8)	**Stanford** (0–3)	Embree (1)	**Jacobs Field**	20,374	66–89	L2
156	September 20	Red Sox	13–4	**Lee** (1–0)	Lowe (16–7)	—	**Jacobs Field**	23,242	67–89	W1
157	September 21	Red Sox	0–2	Martinez (14–4)	**Lee** (3–2)	Kim (15)	**Jacobs Field**	27,655	67–90	L1
158	September 23	@ Twins	1–4	Rogers (13–8)	**Westbrook** (7–10)	Guardado (40)	Hubert H. Humphrey Metrodome	33,650	67–91	L2
159	September 24	@ Twins	2–3	Orosco (2–1)	**Betancourt** (2–2)	Guardado (41)	Hubert H. Humphrey Metrodome	32,986	67–92	L3
160	September 26	@ Blue Jays	2–1	**Stanford** (1–3)	Lidle (12–15)	**Riske** (8)	SkyDome	13,861	68–92	W1
161	September 27	@ Blue Jays	4–5	Halladay (22–7)	**Mulholland** (3–4)	—	SkyDome	21,504	68–93	L1
162	September 28	@ Blue Jays	2–6	Towers (8–1)	**Lee** (3–3)	—	SkyDome	22,014	68–94	L2

Legend: = Win = Loss = Postponement
Bold = Indians team member

== Player stats ==
=== Batting ===
==== Starters by position ====
Note: Pos = Position; G = Games played; AB = At bats; R = Runs scored; H = Hits; 2B = Doubles; 3B = Triples; HR = Home runs; RBI = Runs batted in; AVG = Batting average; SB = Stolen bases

Pos	Player	G	AB	R	H	2B	3B	HR	RBI	AVG	SB
C	Josh Bard	91	303	25	74	13	1	8	36	.244	0
1B	Ben Broussard	116	386	53	96	21	3	16	55	.249	5
2B	Brandon Phillips	112	370	36	77	18	1	6	33	.208	4
3B	Casey Blake	152	557	80	143	35	0	17	67	.257	7
SS	Jhonny Peralta	77	242	24	55	10	1	4	21	.227	1
LF	Matt Lawton	99	374	57	93	19	0	15	53	.249	10
CF	Milton Bradley	101	377	61	121	34	2	10	56	.321	17
RF	Jody Gerut	127	480	66	134	33	2	22	75	.279	4
DH	Ellis Burks	55	198	27	52	11	1	6	28	.263	1

==== Other batters ====
Note: G = Games played; AB = At bats; R = Runs scored; H = Hits; 2B = Doubles; 3B = Triples; HR = Home runs; RBI = Runs batted in; AVG = Batting average; SB = Stolen bases

Player	G	AB	R	H	2B	3B	HR	RBI	AVG	SB
Coco Crisp	99	414	55	110	15	6	3	27	.266	15
Alex Escobar	28	99	16	27	2	0	5	14	.273	1
Karim García	24	93	8	18	1	0	5	14	.194	0
Ricky Gutiérrez	16	50	2	13	3	0	0	3	.260	0
Travis Hafner	91	291	35	74	19	3	14	40	.254	2
Greg LaRocca	5	9	3	3	1	0	0	0	.333	0
Tim Laker	52	162	17	39	11	0	3	21	.241	2
Ryan Ludwick	39	136	14	36	7	1	7	26	.265	2
Chris Magruder	9	26	3	9	2	1	1	3	.346	0
Víctor Martínez	49	159	15	46	4	0	1	16	.289	1
John McDonald	82	214	21	46	9	1	1	14	.215	3
Ángel Santos	32	76	9	17	3	1	3	6	.224	1
Bill Selby	27	39	3	4	1	0	0	5	.103	0
Zach Sorensen	36	37	2	5	1	0	1	2	.135	0
Shane Spencer	64	210	23	57	10	0	8	26	.271	2
Omar Vizquel	64	250	43	61	13	2	2	19	.244	8

Note: Pitchers' hitting stats are not included above.

=== Pitching ===
==== Starting pitchers ====
Note: W = Wins; L = Losses; ERA = Earned run average; G = Games pitched; GS = Games started; IP = Innings pitched; H = Hits allowed; R = Runs allowed; ER = Earned runs allowed; BB = Walks allowed; K = Strikeouts

Player	W	L	ERA	G	GS	IP	H	R	ER	BB	K
CC Sabathia	13	9	3.60	30	30	197.2	190	85	79	66	141
Jason Davis	8	11	4.68	27	27	165.1	172	101	86	47	85
Brian Anderson	9	10	3.71	25	24	148.0	162	88	61	32	72
Ricardo Rodríguez	3	9	5.73	15	15	81.2	89	57	52	28	41
Cliff Lee	3	3	3.61	9	9	52.1	41	28	21	20	44
Jason Bere	0	0	4.05	2	2	6.2	5	3	3	2	1

==== Other pitchers ====
Note: W = Wins; L = Losses; ERA = Earned run average; G = Games pitched; GS = Games started; SV = Saves; IP = Innings pitched; H = Hits allowed; R = Runs allowed; ER = Earned runs allowed; BB = Walks allowed; K = Strikeouts

Player	W	L	ERA	G	GS	SV	IP	H	R	ER	BB	K
Jake Westbrook	7	10	4.33	34	22	0	133.0	142	70	64	56	58
Billy Traber	6	9	5.24	33	18	0	111.2	132	67	65	40	88
Jason Stanford	1	3	3.60	13	8	0	50.0	48	20	20	16	30
Brian Tallet	0	2	4.74	5	3	0	19.0	23	14	10	8	9
Chad Durbin	0	1	7.27	3	1	0	8.2	18	12	7	3	8

==== Relief pitchers ====
Note: W = Wins; L = Losses; ERA = Earned run average; G = Games pitched; SV = Saves; IP = Innings pitched; H = Hits allowed; R = Runs allowed; ER = Earned runs allowed; BB = Walks allowed; K = Strikeouts

Player	W	L	ERA	G	SV	IP	H	R	ER	BB	K
Danys Báez	2	9	3.81	73	25	75.2	65	36	32	23	66
David Riske	2	2	2.29	68	8	74.2	52	21	19	20	82
Jason Boyd	3	1	4.30	44	0	52.1	38	25	25	26	31
Terry Mulholland	3	4	4.91	45	0	99.0	117	60	54	37	42
Rafael Betancourt	2	2	2.13	33	1	38.0	27	11	9	13	36
Jack Cressend	2	1	2.51	33	0	43.0	40	12	12	9	28
José Santiago	1	3	2.84	25	0	31.2	37	11	10	14	15
Dan Miceli	1	1	1.20	13	0	15.0	9	4	2	6	19
Carl Sadler	0	0	1.86	18	0	9.2	11	2	2	5	10
Nick Bierbrodt	0	0	6.75	5	0	8.0	5	6	6	4	9
David Lee	1	0	4.70	8	0	7.2	4	4	4	6	7
Alex Herrera	0	0	9.00	10	0	7.0	7	7	7	8	6
Chad Paronto	0	2	9.45	6	0	6.2	7	8	7	3	6
Jason Phillips	0	1	9.00	3	0	5.0	9	5	5	2	2
Jerrod Riggan	0	0	9.00	2	0	4.0	7	4	4	1	2
David Cortés	0	0	12.00	2	0	3.0	8	5	4	0	1
Aaron Myette	0	0	23.62	2	0	2.2	7	7	7	2	1
Dave Elder	1	1	19.29	4	0	2.1	5	5	5	4	3

== Awards and honors ==
All-Star Game

- C. C. Sabathia, pitcher, reserve

== Minor league affiliates ==
Classification level	Team	League
AAA	Buffalo Bisons	International League
AA	Akron Aeros	Eastern League
Advanced A	Kinston Indians	Carolina League
A	Lake County Captains	South Atlantic League
Short Season A	Mahoning Valley Scrappers	New York–Penn League
Rookie	Burlington Indians	Appalachian League
