= Earl Snyder =

American baseball player (born 1976)

- First baseman / Third baseman
- Born: May 6, 1976 (age 49); New Britain, Connecticut
- Batted: Right Threw: Right

MLB debut
- April 28, 2002, for the Cleveland Indians

Last MLB appearance
- August 18, 2004, for the Boston Red Sox

MLB statistics
- Batting average: .203
- Home runs: 1
- Runs batted in: 4
- Stats at Baseball Reference

Teams
- Cleveland Indians (2002); Boston Red Sox (2004)

Earl Clifford Snyder (born May 6, 1976) is a former Major League Baseball player who played in the Major Leagues for the Cleveland Indians and Boston Red Sox. In his short time in the majors, Snyder played first base, third base, and designated hitter, but in the minors, he played third, first, outfield, shortstop, two games at designated hitter, and one game at second base.

The 6'0", 207 pound Snyder attended Plainville High School in Connecticut and attended the University of Hartford, where he played college baseball for the Hawks. While in college, he played for the Middletown Giants and Danbury Westerners of the New England Collegiate Baseball League. In 1996, he played collegiate summer baseball with the Wareham Gatemen of the Cape Cod Baseball League. He was drafted in the 1998 Major League Baseball draft in the 36th round by the New York Mets, but only reached the Triple-A level with them.

On December 13, 2001, the Mets sent Snyder and Billy Traber to the Cleveland Indians, completing a deal in which the Mets traded Matt Lawton, Alex Escobar, Jerrod Riggan, and two players to be named (Snyder and Traber) to Cleveland in exchange for All-Star Roberto Alomar, Mike Bacsik and Danny Peoples.

After playing the 2002 season with both the Indians and Triple-A Buffalo Bisons, Snyder was claimed off waivers by the Boston Red Sox on January 17, 2003. He was an IL All-Star and an IL postseason All-Star in 2004 for the Pawtucket Red Sox, the Triple-A affiliate of the Boston Red Sox. He also won the Player of the Week Award on May 3, 2004.

Snyder played for the Durham Bulls, the Triple-A affiliate of the Tampa Bay Devil Rays in 2005. He played in the minor leagues for the Cincinnati Reds in 2006 and part of 2007, but played most of the 2007 season for the Charlotte Knights, the Triple-A team of the Chicago White Sox.

Snyder is right-handed and resides in Connecticut.
