= 2003 Seattle Mariners season =

2003 Seattle Mariners
- League: American League
- Division: West
- Ballpark: Safeco Field
- City: Seattle, Washington
- Record: 93–69 (.574)
- Divisional place: 2nd
- Owners: Hiroshi Yamauchi (represented by Howard Lincoln)
- General managers: Pat Gillick
- Managers: Bob Melvin
- Television: KSTW 11; FSN Northwest
- Radio: KOMO 1000 AM (Dave Niehaus, Rick Rizzs, Ron Fairly, Dave Valle, Dave Henderson)

The Seattle Mariners 2003 season was their 27th since the franchise creation. The team finished second in the American League West with a record of 93–69. They would not make the playoffs for the second straight year and despite that, this was their last winning season until 2007.

The team used only five starting pitchers the entire season, which was unusual. The five starting pitchers were Ryan Franklin, Freddy García, Gil Meche, Jamie Moyer, and Joel Piñeiro.

== Offseason ==
- October 11, 2002: Scott Podsednik was selected off waivers by the Milwaukee Brewers from the Mariners.
- November 15: Mariners named Bob Melvin, as the team's new manager, after Lou Piniella left to manage the Tampa Bay Devil Rays.
- December 6: John Olerud re-signed as a free agent with the Mariners.
- January 16, 2003: John Mabry signed as a free agent with Seattle.

== Regular season ==
=== Opening Day starters ===
- Bret Boone
- Mike Cameron
- Jeff Cirillo
- Carlos Guillén
- Mark McLemore
- Jamie Moyer
- John Olerud
- Ichiro Suzuki
- Dan Wilson
- Randy Winn

=== Season standings ===
AL West
Team	W	L	Pct.	GB	Home	Road
Oakland Athletics	96	66	.593	—	57‍–‍24	39‍–‍42
Seattle Mariners	93	69	.574	3	50‍–‍31	43‍–‍38
Anaheim Angels	77	85	.475	19	45‍–‍37	32‍–‍48
Texas Rangers	71	91	.438	25	43‍–‍38	28‍–‍53

=== Record vs. opponents ===
2003 American League record Source: MLB Standings Grid – 2003
Team	ANA	BAL	BOS	CWS	CLE	DET	KC	MIN	NYY	OAK	SEA	TB	TEX	TOR	NL
Anaheim	—	1–8	3–6	3–4	6–3	6–1	6–3	5–4	3–6	8–12	8–11	6–3	9–10	2–7	11–7
Baltimore	8–1	—	9–10	2–4	3–3	3–3	3–4	3–4	6–13–1	2–7	4–5	8–11	7–2	8–11	5–13
Boston	6–3	10–9	—	5–4	4–2	8–1	5–1	2–4	9–10	3–4	5–2	12–7	5–4	10–9	11–7
Chicago	4–3	4–2	4–5	—	11–8	11–8	11–8	9–10	4–2	4–5	2–7	3–3	3–4	6–3	10–8
Cleveland	3–6	3–3	2–4	8–11	—	12–7	6–13	9–10	2–5	3–6	3–6	5–2	4–5	2–4	6–12
Detroit	1–6	3–3	1–8	8–11	7–12	—	5–14	4–15	1–5	3–6	1–8	2–4	1–6	2–7	4–14
Kansas City	3–6	4–3	1–5	8–11	13–6	14–5	—	11–8	2–4	2–7	4–5	4–3	7–2	1–5	9–9
Minnesota	4–5	4–3	4–2	10–9	10–9	15–4	8–11	—	0–7	8–1	3–6	6–0	5–4	3–3	10–8
New York	6–3	13–6–1	10–9	2–4	5–2	5–1	4–2	7–0	—	3–6	5–4	14–5	4–5	10–9	13–5
Oakland	12–8	7–2	4–3	5–4	6–3	6–3	7–2	1–8	6–3	—	7–12	6–3	15–4	5–2	9–9
Seattle	11–8	5–4	2–5	7–2	6–3	8–1	5–4	6–3	4–5	12–7	—	4–5	10–10	3–4	10–8
Tampa Bay	3–6	11–8	7–12	3–3	2–5	4–2	3–4	0–6	5–14	3–6	5–4	—	3–6	11–8	3–15
Texas	10–9	2–7	4–5	4–3	5–4	6–1	2–7	4–5	5–4	4–15	10–10	6–3	—	5–4	4–14
Toronto	7–2	11–8	9–10	3–6	4–2	7–2	5–1	3–3	9–10	2–5	4–3	8–11	4–5	—	10–8

Mariners vs. National League
Team	NL West	NL East				
Team	SDP	ATL	FLA	MTL	NYM	PHI
Seattle	2–4	2–1	–	1–2	2–1	3–0

=== Notable transactions ===
- July 29, 2003: Kenny Kelly was traded by the Seattle Mariners to the New York Mets for Rey Sánchez and cash.

=== Roster ===
2003 Seattle Mariners
Roster
Pitchers: 49 Armando Benítez; 32 Giovanni Carrara; 45 Ryan Franklin; 34 Freddy García; 17 Shigetoshi Hasegawa; 46 Aaron Looper; 40 Julio Mateo; 55 Gil Meche; 50 Jamie Moyer; 43 Jeff Nelson; 38 Joel Piñeiro; 20 J. J. Putz; 53 Arthur Rhodes; 22 Kazuhiro Sasaki; 39 Rafael Soriano; 59 Brian Sweeney; 54 Aaron Taylor; 59 Matt White	Catchers: 10 Pat Borders; 13 Ben Davis; 6 Dan Wilson; Infielders: 16 Willie Bloomquist; 29 Bret Boone; 7 Jeff Cirillo; 28 Greg Colbrunn; 8 Carlos Guillén; 4 Mark McLemore; 5 John Olerud; 1 Rey Sánchez; 23 Luis Ugueto	Outfielders: 44 Mike Cameron; 47 John Mabry; 30 Chad Meyers; 36 Jamal Strong; 51 Ichiro Suzuki; 2 Randy Winn; Other batters: 11 Edgar Martínez	Manager: 3 Bob Melvin; Coaches: 49 Orlando Gómez (bullpen); 33 Lamar Johnson (hitting); 9 Rene Lachemann (bench); 12 John Moses (first base); 31 Dave Myers (third base); 35 Bryan Price (pitching)

== Player stats ==
=== Batting ===
==== Starters by position ====
Note: Pos = Position; G = Games played; AB = At bats; H = Hits; Avg. = Batting average; HR = Home runs; RBI = Runs batted in

Pos	Player	G	AB	H	Avg.	HR	RBI
C	Dan Wilson	96	316	76	.241	4	43
1B	John Olerud	152	539	145	.269	10	83
2B	Bret Boone	159	622	183	.294	35	117
SS	Carlos Guillén	109	388	107	.276	7	52
3B	Jeff Cirillo	87	258	53	.205	2	23
LF	Randy Winn	157	600	177	.295	11	75
CF	Mike Cameron	147	534	135	.253	18	76
RF	Ichiro Suzuki	159	679	212	.312	13	62
DH	Edgar Martínez	145	497	146	.294	24	98

==== Other batters ====
Note: G = Games played; AB = At bats; H = Hits; Avg. = Batting average; HR = Home runs; RBI = Runs batted in

Player	G	AB	H	Avg.	HR	RBI
Mark McLemore	99	309	72	.233	2	37
Ben Davis	80	246	58	.236	6	42
Willie Bloomquist	89	196	49	.250	1	14
Rey Sánchez	46	170	50	.294	0	11
John Mabry	64	104	22	.212	3	16
Greg Colbrunn	22	58	16	.276	3	7
Pat Borders	12	14	2	.143	0	1
Luis Ugueto	12	5	1	.200	0	1
Jamal Strong	12	2	0	.000	0	0
Chad Meyers	9	1	0	.000	0	0

=== Pitching ===
==== Starting pitchers ====
Note; G = Games pitched; IP = Innings pitched; W = Wins; L = Losses; ERA = Earned run average; SO = Strikeouts

Player	G	IP	W	L	ERA	SO
Jamie Moyer	33	215.0	21	7	3.27	129
Ryan Franklin	32	212.0	11	13	3.57	99
Joel Piñeiro	32	211.2	16	11	3.78	151
Freddy García	33	201.1	12	14	4.51	144
Gil Meche	32	186.1	15	13	4.59	130

==== Relief pitchers ====
Note; G = Games pitched; W = Wins; L = Losses; SV = Saves; ERA = Earned run average; SO = Strikeouts

Player	G	W	L	SV	ERA	SO
Shigetoshi Hasegawa	63	2	4	16	1.48	32
Arthur Rhodes	67	3	3	3	4.17	48
Julio Mateo	50	4	0	1	3.15	71
Jeff Nelson	46	3	2	7	3.35	47
Rafael Soriano	40	3	0	1	1.53	68
Kazuhiro Sasaki	35	1	2	10	4.05	29
Giovanni Carrara	23	2	0	0	6.83	13
Armando Benítez	15	0	0	0	3.14	15
Aaron Taylor	10	0	0	0	8.53	9
Aaron Looper	6	0	0	0	5.14	6
Brian Sweeney	5	0	0	0	1.93	7
J.J. Putz	3	0	0	0	4.91	3
Matt White	3	0	0	0	13.50	0

== Awards and honors ==
- Jamie Moyer, Roberto Clemente Award and Hutch Award
- MLB All-Stars: Moyer, Ichiro Suzuki, Edgar Martínez, Bret Boone, Shigetoshi Hasegawa

== Farm system ==
Level	Team	League	Manager
AAA	Tacoma Rainiers	Pacific Coast League	Dan Rohn
AA	San Antonio Missions	Texas League	Dave Brundage
A	Inland Empire 66ers	California League	Steve Roadcap
A	Wisconsin Timber Rattlers	Midwest League	Daren Brown
A-Short Season	Everett AquaSox	Northwest League	Pedro Grifol
Rookie	AZL Mariners	Arizona League	Scott Steinmann

League champions: San Antonio, Inland Empire

== Major League Baseball draft ==
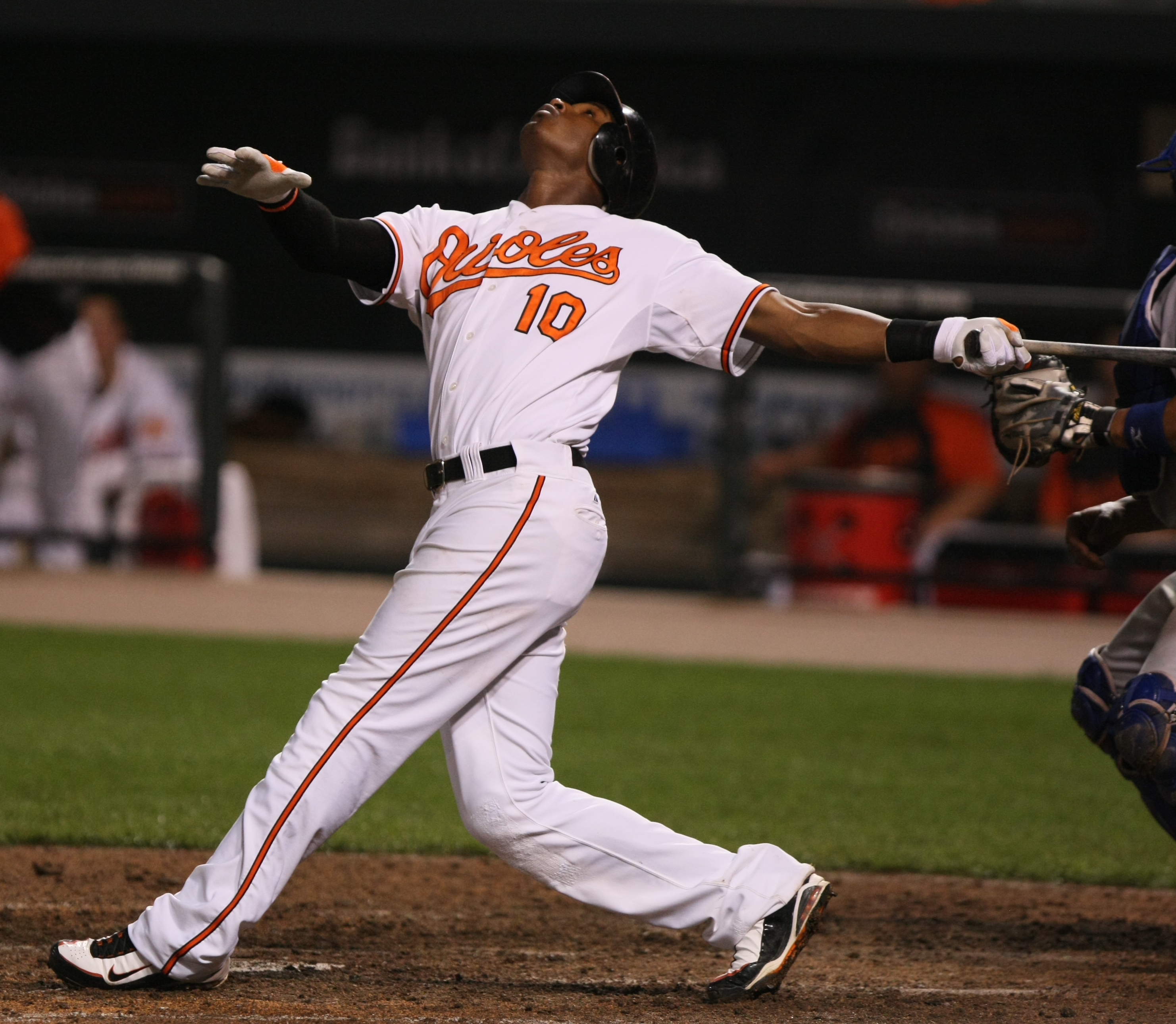
2003 Seattle Mariners draft picks
Adam Jones (pictured) was the Mariners first round pick in 2003.
Information
**Owner**	Nintendo of America
**General Manager(s)**	Pat Gillick
**Manager(s)**	Bob Melvin
**First pick**	Adam Jones
**Draft positions**	19th
**Number of selections**	53
Links
**Results**	Baseball-Reference
**Official Site**	The Official Site of the Seattle Mariners
**Years**	2002 • 2003 • 2004

The following is a list of 2003 Seattle Mariners draft picks. The Mariners took part in both the Rule 4 draft (June amateur draft) and the Rule 5 draft. The Mariners made 53 selections in the 2003 draft, the first being shortstop Adam Jones in the first round. In all, the Mariners selected 30 pitchers, 8 outfielders, 6 catchers, 4 shortstops, 4 third basemen, and 1 first baseman.

=== Draft ===
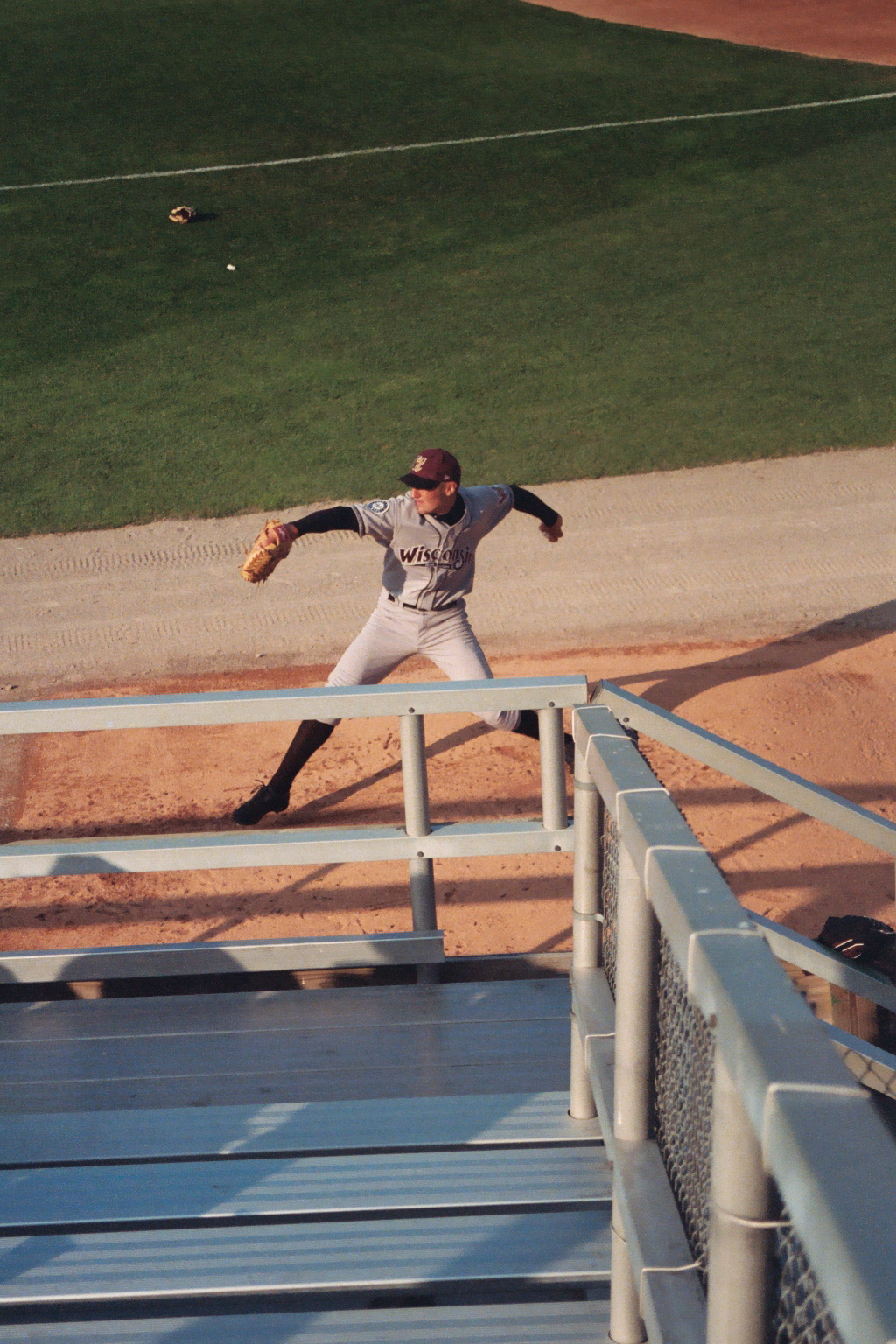
Ryan Feierabend was selected in the third round by the Mariners.

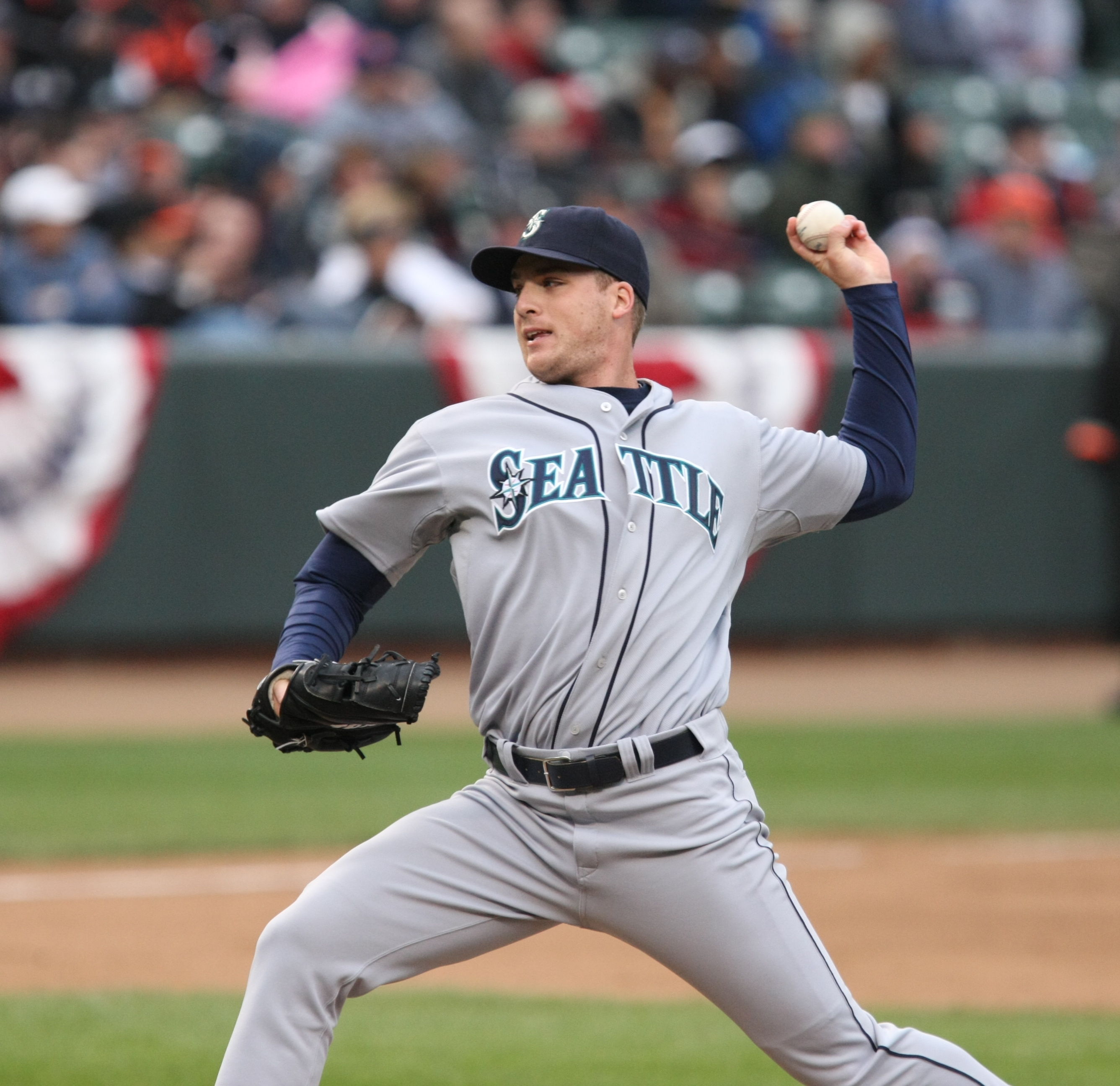
Eric O'Flaherty was selected by the Mariners in the sixth round.

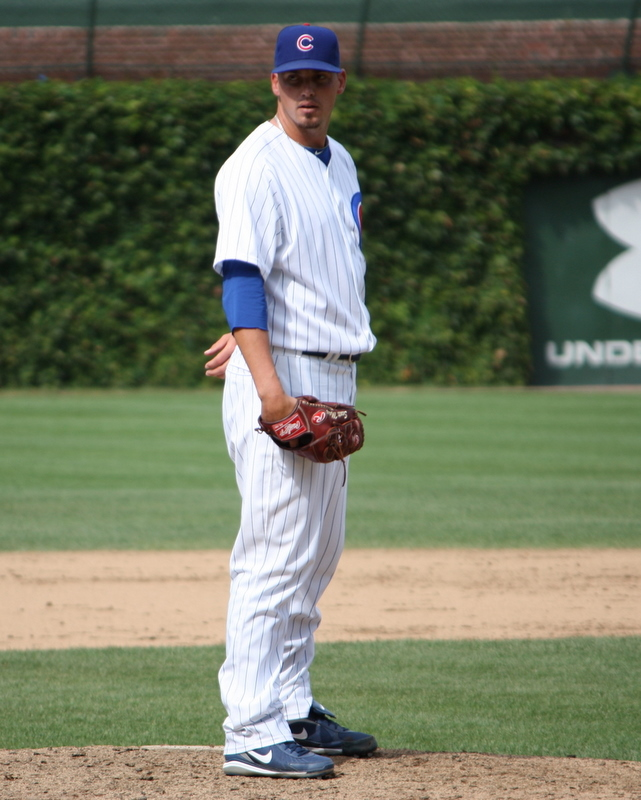
Scott Maine was selected with the 446th pick in the 2003 draft.

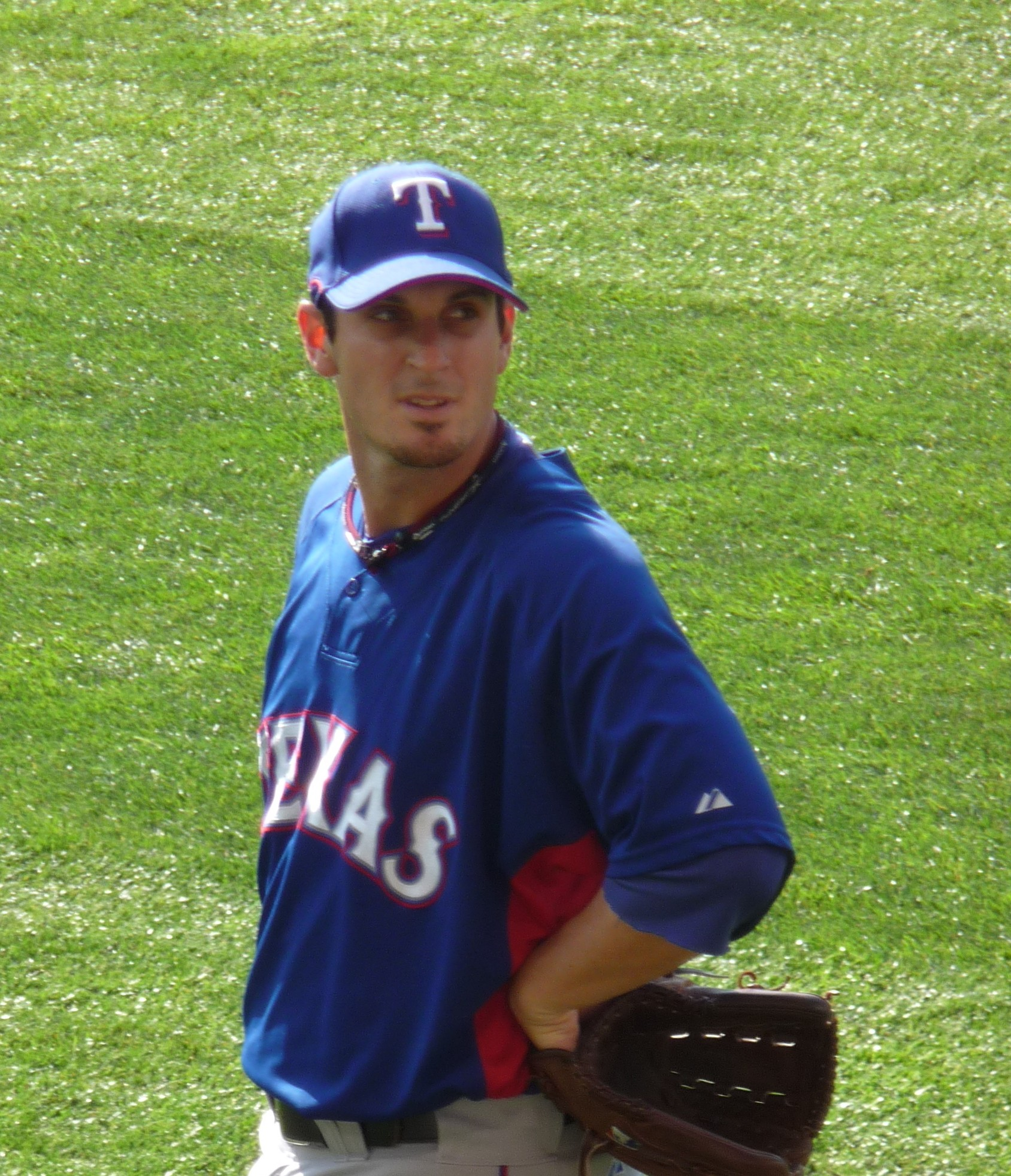
In the 31st round the Mariners selected Doug Mathis.

=== Key ===
Round (Pick)	Indicates the round and pick the player was drafted
Position	Indicates the secondary/collegiate position at which the player was drafted, rather than the professional position the player may have gone on to play
**Bold**	Indicates the player signed with the Mariners
Italics	Indicates the player did not sign with the Mariners
*	Indicates the player made an appearance in Major League Baseball

=== Table ===
Round (Pick)	Name	Position	School	Source
1s (37)	**Adam Jones**	Shortstop	Morse High School	
2 (56)	**Jeff Flaig**	Third baseman	El Dorado High School	
3 (86)	**Ryan Feierabend**	Left-handed pitcher	Midview High School	
4 (116)	**Paul Fagan**	Left-handed pitcher	Bartram Trail High School	
5 (146)	**Casey Abrams**	Left-handed pitcher	Wright State University	
6 (176)	**Eric O'Flaherty**	Left-handed pitcher	Walla Walla High School	
7 (206)	**Jeremy Dutton**	Third baseman	North Carolina State University	
8 (236)	**Thomas Oldham**	Third baseman	Creighton University	
9 (266)	**Justin Ruchti**	Catcher	Rice University	
10 (296)	**Mike Cox**	Third baseman	Florida Atlantic University	
11 (326)	**Joe Woerman**	Right-handed pitcher	San Diego City College	
12 (356)	**Ruben Flores**	Right-handed pitcher	El Paso Community College	
13 (386)	**Shawn Nottingham**	Left-handed pitcher	Jackson High School	
14 (416)	**Tim Dorn**	Right-handed pitcher	East Los Angeles College	
15 (446)	Scott Maine	Left-handed pitcher	William T. Dwyer High School	
16 (476)	**Brian Schweiger**	Catcher	California State University, San Bernardino	
17 (506)	**Jason Snyder**	Right-handed pitcher	Dixie State College	
18 (536)	**James Hymon**	Shortstop	Rust College	
19 (566)	**Aaron Jensen**	Right-handed pitcher	Springville High School	
20 (596)	**Carroll Gaddis**	Outfielder	Hoke County High School	
21 (626)	**Casey Craig**	Outfielder	Granite Hills High School	
22 (656)	**Samuel Bradford**	Outfielder	Gardner–Webb University	
23 (686)	**Daniel Santin**	Catcher	Miami Brito High School	
24 (716)	**Kenny Falconer**	Right-handed pitcher	University of Kansas	
25 (746)	**Jason Cable**	Left-handed pitcher	Palmdale High School	
26 (776)	Gordon Lynah	Outfielder	Spartanburg Methodist College	
27 (806)	**Richard Breshears**	Right-handed pitcher	Hutchinson Community College	
28 (836)	**Daniel McDonald**	Left-handed pitcher	Theodore High School	
29 (866)	**Christopher Garcia**	Right-handed pitcher	None	
30 (896)	Steve Santos	Right-handed pitcher	Los Medanos College	
31 (926)	Doug Mathis	Right-handed pitcher	Central Arizona College	
32 (956)	**Adam Poole**	Left-handed pitcher	Lincoln Trail College	
33 (986)	**Blake Rampy**	Right-handed pitcher	Tomball High School	
34 (1016)	**Paul Keck**	Catcher	Sacramento City College	
35 (1046)	Andy Reichard	Right-handed pitcher	State College High School	
36 (1076)	**Alexander Baboulas**	Left-handed pitcher	Birchmount Park Collegiate Institute	
37 (1106)	**Joel Allin**	Left-handed pitcher	Stockbridge High School	
38 (1136)	Yusuf Carter	Catcher	Canarsie High School	
39 (1166)	**Trevor Heid**	Outfielder	Dixie State College	
40 (1196)	**Mark Tourangeau**	Right-handed pitcher	Queen Elizabeth Park High School	
41 (1226)	**Dane Awana**	Left-handed pitcher	Saddleback College	
42 (1255)	Danny Santiesteban	Outfielder	Miami Brito High School	
43 (1284)	Harold Williams	Right-handed pitcher	Cerritos College	
44 (1312)	**Edwin Totesault**	Shortstop	Miami Brito High School	
45 (1339)	**McCay Green**	Right-handed pitcher	Lake–Sumter Community College	
46 (1366)	Mike Hofius	First baseman	California State University, San Bernardino	
47 (1393)	Daniel Kapala	Right-handed pitcher	Shrine Catholic High School	
48 (1420)	**Markus Roberts**	Shortstop	Deer Valley High School	
49 (1446)	**Jose Laffitte**	Outfielder	Miami High School	
50 (1472)	**Timothy Turner**	Outfielder	East Tennessee State University	

== Rule 5 draft ==
=== Key ===
Pick	Indicates the pick the player was drafted
Previous team	Indicates the previous organization, not Minor league team

=== Table ===
Phase (Pick)	Name	Position	Previous team	Notes	Ref
Triple-A (16)	Darwin Soto	Infielder	San Diego Padres		
Triple-A (36)	Omar Falcon	Catcher	San Diego Padres		
Triple-A (47)	Chris Key	Left-handed pitcher	Florida Marlins		
