= Matt Lawton =

American baseball player (born 1971)

- Outfielder
- Born: November 30, 1971 (age 54); Gulfport, Mississippi, U.S.
- Batted: Left Threw: Right

MLB debut
- September 5, 1995, for the Minnesota Twins

Last MLB appearance
- May 16, 2006, for the Seattle Mariners

MLB statistics
- Batting average: .267
- Home runs: 138
- Runs batted in: 631
- Stats at Baseball Reference

Teams
- Minnesota Twins (1995–2001); New York Mets (2001); Cleveland Indians (2002–2004); Pittsburgh Pirates (2005); Chicago Cubs (2005); New York Yankees (2005); Seattle Mariners (2006)

Career highlights and awards
- 2× All-Star (2000, 2004)

Matthew Lawton, Jr. (born November 30, 1971) is an American former professional baseball player whose career spanned 15 seasons, including 12 seasons in Major League Baseball (MLB). Lawton, an outfielder, made his major league debut September 5, 1995, with the Minnesota Twins, who signed him four years prior. He also played in the majors with the New York Mets (2001), the Cleveland Indians (2002–04), the Pittsburgh Pirates (2005), the Chicago Cubs (2005), the New York Yankees (2005), and the Seattle Mariners (2006). Over his major league career, Lawton compiled a .267 batting average with 1,273 hits, 267 doubles, 17 triples, 138 home runs, 631 runs batted in (RBIs), 165 stolen bases, and 681 walks in 1,334 games played.

The Twins selected Lawton in the 1991 MLB draft out of Mississippi Gulf Coast Community College. A season later, he made his professional debut in the minor leagues with the Gulf Coast League Twins. He also played in the minors with the Fort Wayne Wizards (1993), the Fort Myers Miracle (1994, 1999), the Hardware City Rock Cats (1995), the Salt Lake Buzz (1996), and the Akron Aeros (2002–03). In the minors, Lawton compiled a .282 batting average with 460 hits, 95 doubles, 13 triples, 38 home runs, 206 RBIs, 114 stolen bases, 262 walks and 466 runs.

Lawton has won multiple awards over his career. He was selected to play in the 1994 Florida State League All-Star Game. He was also selected to play in the MLB All-Star twice for the American League (AL) team (2000, 2004). During the 2000 season, Lawton was named the Minnesota Twins Player of the Year.

After the 2005 season, Lawton received a ten-game suspension by MLB after testing positive to performance-enhancing drugs. Lawton did not appeal the suspension, instead acknowledging his use of the drugs. In a statement to the Associated Press, he apologized to "all those people that [he] let down".

== Amateur career ==
Lawton attended Harrison Central High School in Lyman, Mississippi. He played American Legion baseball with future NFL Hall of Fame quarterback, Brett Favre, making up a double play tandem with Favre at shortstop and Lawton at second base. Lawton attended Mississippi Gulf Coast Community College in Perkinston, Mississippi. Lawton's coach in college was Cooper Farris. From Mississippi Gulf Coast Community College, he was drafted by the Minnesota Twins in the 13^{th} round of the 1991 Major League Baseball draft. Five of Lawton's community college teammates were also drafted in 1991. Lawton is one of four attendees of Mississippi Gulf Coast who later played in MLB. In 2004, Lawton donated US$10,000 to his alma mater. The funds were used to build a covered batting cage and improve the baseball team's field.

== Professional career ==
=== Minnesota Twins ===
==== Minor leagues (1992–1995) ====
Lawton signed with the Minnesota Twins on August 12, 1991, after being selected by them in that year's draft. He began his professional baseball career in 1992 with the Gulf Coast League Twins of the rookie-league Gulf Coast League. That season, Lawton batted .260 with 39 runs scored, 45 hits, eight doubles, three triples, two home runs, 26 runs batted in (RBIs), 20 stolen bases, and 27 walks in 53 games played. Amongst league batters, Lawton was third in runs scored, and fifth in stolen bases.

During the 1993 season, Lawton was assigned to the Fort Wayne Wizards of the Class-A Midwest League. With the Wizards, he batted .285 with 50 runs scored, 97 hits, 21 doubles, three triples, nine home runs, 38 RBIs, 23 stolen bases, and 65 walks in 111 games played. He was tied for tenth in the league in caught stealing (15).

In 1994, Lawton was assigned to play with the Class-A Advanced Fort Myers Miracle. He was named to the 1994 Florida State League All-Star Team. On the season, Lawton batted .300 with 79 runs scored, 134 hits, 30 doubles, one triple, seven home runs, 51 RBIs, 42 stolen bases, and 80 walks in 122 games played. He was tied for second in the league caught stealing (19), and walks; fourth in stolen bases; eighth in runs scored; and ninth in doubles.

==== Major leagues (1995–2001) ====
Lawton began the 1995 season in the minor leagues with the Hardware City Rock Cats of the Double-A Eastern League. With the Rock Cats, he batted .269 with 75 runs, 111 hits, 19 doubles, five triples, 13 home runs, 54 RBIs, 26 stolen bases, and 56 walks in 114 game played. The Minnesota Twins called Lawton up in September of that year. He made his debut in Major League Baseball (MLB) on September 5, against the Detroit Tigers. In that game, Lawton struck out in one at-bat. Lawton got his first hit of his major league career on September 6, against the Tigers. On September 28, against the Cleveland Indians, Lawton hit his first career major league home run. In the majors that year, Lawton batted .317 with 11 runs scored, 19 hits, four doubles, one triple, one home run, and 12 RBIs in 21 games played. On defense with the Twins, Lawton played 12 games in center field, eight games in right field, and one game in left field. After the 1995 season, Lawton played in the Arizona Fall League.

Before the 1996 season, Baseball Digest described Lawton as "very versatile" and stated that he had good arm speed and a "very live bat". He started the season with the Twins, but was sent to the minor leagues in early May. In the minors, Lawton played with the Triple-A Salt Lake Buzz. On May 20, Lawton returned to Salt Lake City after attending the funeral of his aunt. In the minors, he batted .297 with 40 runs, 63 hits, 16 doubles, on triple, seven home runs, and 33 RBIs in 53 games played. Later in the season, Lawton returned to the majors with the Twins. In the majors, he batted .258 with 34 runs, 65 hits, seven doubles, one triple, six home runs, 42 RBIs, and 28 walks in 78 games played. On defense, Lawton played 60 games in right field, 18 game in center field, and one game in left field.

In spring training during the 1997 season, Lawton was competing for the fourth outfielder spot on the Twins roster. Lawton made the Twins roster out of spring training. On June 14, while the Twins were playing the Houston Astros at the Astrodome, Lawton left 38 tickets for his family, who were visiting from Gulfport, Mississippi. In his first full season in MLB, Lawton batted .248 with 74 runs scored, 114 hits, 29 doubles, three triples, 14 home runs, 60 RBIs, and seven stolen bases in 142 games played. In the field, Lawton played 67 games in right field, 58 in left field, and 23 in center field. He committed a combined seven errors, and made nine assists and 278 putouts.

Lawton struggled early during the 1998 season, but started playing better through the mid-season. On May 9, Lawton hit a grand slam against the New York Yankees, which led the Twins to an 8–1 victory. Late into the season, Twins manager Tom Kelly commented that Lawton had improved well over the season, but still had more work to do before he would become a "winning player". On September 1, Lawton hit a game-winning triple against the Tampa Bay Devil Rays in the bottom of the tenth inning. At season's end, Lawton compiled a .278 batting average with 91 runs scored, 155 hits, 36 doubles, six triples, 21 home runs, 77 RBIs, and 16 stolen bases in 152 games played. On defense, he played 100 games in right field, 47 in center field, and 12 in left field. He committed four errors; and made 12 assists, and 389 putouts as an outfielder. Amongst American League (AL) hitters that year, Lawton was tied for fourth in hit by pitches (15); ninth in walks (86), tenth in on-base percentage (.387), and tied for tenth in triples.

Before the 1999 season, Lawton in the Twins failed to agree on a contract. This led to arbitration proceedings, with Lawton requesting US$2.4 million. The Twins countered with a US$1.7 million contract, which Lawton refused. On April 18, 1999, Lawton hit a grand slam in the bottom of the 11^{th} inning to give the Twins the victory over the Cleveland Indians. Todd Walker, the Twins infielder at the time, was Lawton's good friend since they met in the minors. On June 8, Lawton shattered his eye socket in two places after being hit by a pitch from Cincinnati Reds pitcher Dennys Reyes. Lawton played five rehab games in the minor leagues with the rookie-level Gulf Coast League Twins, and the Class-A Advanced Fort Myers Miracle, batting a combined .500. Lawton made his return to the majors on July 18. He wore a protective cage on his batting helmet until July 21, shedding it because it limited his vision. During a game at the SkyDome against the Toronto Blue Jays, Lawton spat towards a 16-year-old fan who called him a racial slur. The two later exchanged apologies. Lawton potentially faced assault charges, but nothing was ever filed. On the season, Lawton batted .259 with 58 runs scored, 105 hits, 18 doubles, seven home runs, 54 RBIs, and 26 stolen bases in 118 games played. In the field, he played 103 games in right field, 10 in left field, and six in center field. In all of his outfield games, Lawton committed four errors; and made three assists and 231 putouts.

During spring training in 2000, Lawton stated that his eye socket was fully healed after the injury he suffered in 1999. On April 9, 2000, Lawton failed to catch a ball hit by Carlos Beltrán in the seventh inning that would have kept Twins pitcher Eric Milton's perfect game bid alive. In July, Lawton played on the AL team during the 2000 MLB All-Star Game. In the game, Lawton appeared in two at-bats, getting one hit and driving in a run. At season's end, Lawton compiled a .305 batting average with 84 runs scored, 171 hits, 44 doubles, two triples, 13 home runs, 88 RBIs, and 23 stolen bases in 156 games played. He played 83 games in right field, 67 in left field, and three in center field. Defensively, Lawton committed five errors; and made four assists, and 278 putouts. Amongst AL batters, Lawton was tied for fifth in doubles. After the season, he was named the Twins Player of the Year.

In February 2001, Twins general manager Terry Ryan stated that he did not plan on trading Lawton, contrary to other reports. Furthermore, Twins manager Tom Kelley stated that he did not expect Lawton would be traded under any circumstances. It was noted in spring training in 2001 that Lawton had gained 14 pounds (6.4 kg). Lawton was taken out of the Twins starting lineup in May, due to lack of production. As a member of the Twins that year, he batted .293 with 71 runs scored, 110 hits, 25 doubles, 10 home runs, 51 RBIs, and 19 stolen bases in 103 games played.

=== New York Mets (2001) ===
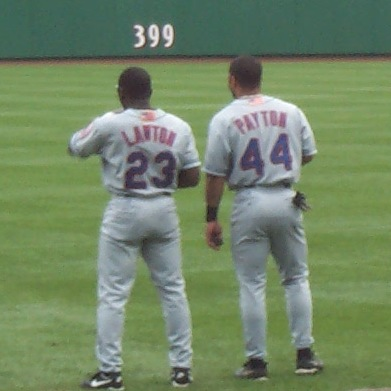
Lawton (left) with Jay Payton before a game with the Mets in 2001

On July 31, 2001, the Minnesota Twins traded Lawton to the New York Mets in exchange for Rick Reed. During his time with the Mets, Lawton split time with outfielders Tsuyoshi Shinjo, Joe McEwing, Benny Agbayani, and Jay Payton. In his Mets debut on July 13, against the Houston Astros, Lawton got one hit in four at-bats. His first home run as a Mets player came on August 5, against the Arizona Diamondbacks. Lawton sometimes batted in the third position in the Mets' batting order. With New York that season, he batted .246 with 24 runs scored, 45 hits, 11 doubles, one triple, three home runs, 13 RBIs, and 10 stolen bases in 48 games played. Combined between the Twins and Mets that season, Lawton batted .277 with 95 runs scored, 155 hits, 36 doubles, one triple, 13 home runs, 64 RBIs, and 26 stolen bases in 151 games played. In his combined defensive stats as an outfielder, Lawton committed four errors; and made three assists, and 289 putouts.

=== Cleveland Indians (2002–04) ===
Lawton was traded from the New York Mets to the Cleveland Indians during the winter of 2001. In the deal, the Mets sent Lawton, a players to be named later, Alex Escobar, and Jerrod Riggan to the Indians in exchange for Danny Peoples, Roberto Alomar, Mike Bacsik. The players to be named was Earl Snyder and Billy Traber, who were sent to the Indians two days later. On April 18, 2002, in a game against the Minnesota Twins, Lawton separated his right shoulder after diving for the ball in right field, but played through the injury. On May 18, Lawton hit a two-out, two-run home run in the bottom of the ninth inning to give the Indians a walk-off win against the Baltimore Orioles. On September 19, Lawton was placed on the disabled list, and was later forced to sit out the rest of the season after feeling pain in his labrum, which was torn earlier in the season. He played three rehab games in the minors that season with the Double-A Akron Aeros, getting no hits in 10 at-bats. There were rumors that Lawton may not be ready for the start of the 2003 season. On the season with the Indians, Lawton batted .236 with 71 runs scored 98 hits, 19 doubles, two triples, 15 home runs, 57 RBIs, and eight stolen bases in 114 games played. He played 85 games in right field, and 23 in left field. As an outfielder, he committed six errors, and made six assists and 229 putouts. He underwent arthroscopic surgery after the season to repair a tear in his labrum and fraying in the rotator cuff. Doctors also removed a cyst from his acromioclavicular joint.

Lawton spent the entire 2002–03 winter rehabbing. Before the 2003 season, Indians' manager Eric Wedge stated that he had questions about Lawton's health. However, team officials also stated that Lawton was completely healthy. At the start of the 2003 season, Lawton's teammate Milton Bradley commented that people would confuse him for Lawton. Bradley joked, "I mean, give me Matt Lawton's paycheck...I'll be Matt." During both the 2002 and 2003 seasons, Lawton purchased tickets for a Boys & Girls Clubs of America group called "Lawton Little Leaguers". On July 11, 2003, Lawton was placed on the disabled list after jamming his middle finger. He rehabbed in the minor leagues, batting .053 in five games with the Double-A Akron Aeros. Lawton was activated from the disabled list on August 18. To make room for Lawton after his activation, the Indians optioned infielder Zach Sorensen to the minor leagues. On September 9, Lawton was again placed on the disabled list due to issues with his middle finger. Lawton also underwent surgery to repair a torn meniscus, marking the second time in as many years that he finished his season with surgery. The procedure was performed by Indians' team doctor Mark Schickendantz. With the Indians in 2003, Lawton batted .249 with 57 runs scored, 93 hits, 19 doubles, 15 home runs, 53 RBIs, and 10 stolen bases in 99 games played.

On April 6, 2004, Lawton filed a report with the Philadelphia Police Department regarding a jewelry theft in his hotel room. Lawton, who was in Philadelphia with the Indians, reported that the jewelry in question was worth US$117,000. On April 18, Lawton hit two home runs in a game against the Detroit Tigers. Lawton was selected to play in the MLB All-Star Game that season. In that game, he got one hit in two at-bats. On August 9, Lawton hit a game-winning home run against the Chicago White Sox. On the season, Lawton batted .277 with 109 runs scored, 164 hits, 25 doubles, 20 home runs, 70 RBIs, and 23 stolen bases in 150 games played. As a fielder, he played 124 games in right field, and 19 in left field. On defense, Lawton committed four errors; and made nine assists and 266 putouts. Amongst AL batters, Lawton was tied for fifth in double plays grounded into (21), tied for sixth in stolen bases, and was tied for tenth in caught stealing (9).

=== Pittsburgh Pirates (2005) ===
The Cleveland Indians traded Lawton to the Pittsburgh Pirates for reliever Arthur Rhodes on December 11, 2004. Both teams received cash considerations from each other. Pirates general manager Dave Littlefield said Lawton had "some power, a left-handed hitter, it adds some nice balance to our offense".

Lawton was slated to be the team's leadoff hitter after the departure of Jason Kendall during the 2004 season. On May 20, 2005, Lawton hit a home run off Jamey Wright of the Colorado Rockies that landed in the Allegheny River. On July 14, Lawton acknowledged he heard rumors that the Pirates were considering trading him before the July 31 trade deadline. With the Pirates to start the season, Lawton batted .273 with 28 doubles, one triple, 10 home runs, 44 RBIs, and 16 stolen bases in 101 games.

=== Chicago Cubs (2005) ===
On July 31, 2005, the Pirates traded Lawton to the Chicago Cubs in exchange for outfielder Jody Gerut. The Cubs acquired Lawton to be their leadoff hitter. Cubs second baseman Todd Walker was happy that his team traded for Lawton, who had been his friend since playing in the minor leagues together. Lawton said this about the trade:

When I got the official call, it was a relief, overwhelming. It's a chance to play in Chicago, and I'm just excited to get it going. I was hearing a lot of stuff like Baltimore [Orioles], the [New York] Yankees, Boston [Red Sox]. I never really heard Chicago. I guess that's how it is...You just fly under the radar."

— Matt Lawton, August 2, 2005: MLB.com

Lawton batted leadoff in his debut with the Cubs, which was against the Philadelphia Phillies on August 2. Lawton got two hits in five at-bats. He hit his first and only home run with the Cubs on August 14, against the St. Louis Cardinals. In less than a month with Chicago, Lawton batted .244 with eight runs scored, 19 hits, two doubles, one home run, and five RBIs in 19 games played. Authors of Cubs by the Numbers, Al Yellon, Kasey Ignarski, and Matthew Silverman later commented that Lawton's tenure with the Cubs was "useless".

=== New York Yankees (2005) ===
The Cubs traded Lawton to the New York Yankees for pitcher Justin Berg, who was a member of the New York's minor league system since 2003, on August 27, 2005. Yankees manager Joe Torre commented that adding Lawton to the roster gave the team more depth and described him as a "talented player". Lawton got his first hit as a member of the Yankees in his debut with the team on August 27, against the Kansas City Royals. His first Yankees home run came against the Seattle Mariners on August 29. It was noted by MLB.com that Lawton struggled as a member of the Yankees. In 21 games with the Yankees, Lawton batted .125 with two home runs, and four RBIs. Combined between the Pirates, Cubs, and Yankees that season, he batted .254 with 30 doubles, one triple, 13 home runs, 53 RBIs, and 18 stolen bases in 141 games played. Lawton ranked tenth in the National League in caught stealing (9). Amongst NL fielders, he was second in fielding percentage (.995) as a right fielder. Lawton was left off the Yankees postseason roster and left the team to return to his Mississippi home, which was damaged by Hurricane Katrina. Lawton never played in an MLB postseason game.

=== Performance-enhancing drug use ===
On November 3, 2005, it was announced that Lawton had tested positive for performance-enhancing drugs. This led to a 10-day suspension by MLB. Lawton was to serve his suspension at the start of the 2006 regular season. The test was taken after Lawton was traded to the Yankees in August 2005. He was suspended for using the veterinary steroid boldenone. Lawton made the following statement to the Associated Press following his suspension:

I made a terrible and foolish mistake that I will regret for the rest of my life. I take full responsibility for my actions and did not appeal my suspension. I apologize to the fans, the game, my family and all those people that I let down. I am truly sorry and deeply regret my terrible lapse in judgment.

— Matt Lawton, November 2, 2005: Associated Press

=== Seattle Mariners (2006) ===
At the start of the 2005–06 free agent cycle, Lawton had eight teams that he would sign with. Two teams were immediately not interested. The Seattle Mariners, one of the teams Lawton wanted to join, were wary of taking Lawton because of his drug suspension, but eventually signed him. The deal was made official on December 23, 2005. His contract was a one-year major league contract worth $400,000, with more than $1 million in possible incentives. It also had a no-trade clause. During spring training in 2006, the Mariners allowed Lawton and teammate Eddie Guardado leave camp to attend the funeral services for former teammate Kirby Puckett. Lawton returned from his suspension on April 12. After activating him on the roster, the Mariners designated catcher Guillermo Quiróz for assignment. Lawton gave Mariners officials the permission required to release him, saying that "I went to them in a friendly manner and just said 'Hey, I'll be the guy you can send out' if they felt the need". Lawton was designated for assignment on May 20. Mariners general manager Bill Bavasi added Mike Morse to the major league roster in Lawton's place. With the Mariners that season, Lawton batted .259 with five runs scored, seven hits, and one RBI in 11 games played.

== Personal life ==
Lawton is married. His daughter, Chassity, was born July 3, 1993 and died on July 15, 2025. His son was born in 2000. Lawton's brother, Marcus Lawton, also played in MLB. During his brother's playing career in the New York Mets organization, Lawton was the team's batboy. They also have a younger brother. Their second cousin Fred Lewis also played in MLB.

== See also ==
- List of Major League Baseball career stolen bases leaders
- List of Major League Baseball players suspended for performance-enhancing drugs
