= Billy Traber =

American baseball player (born 1979)

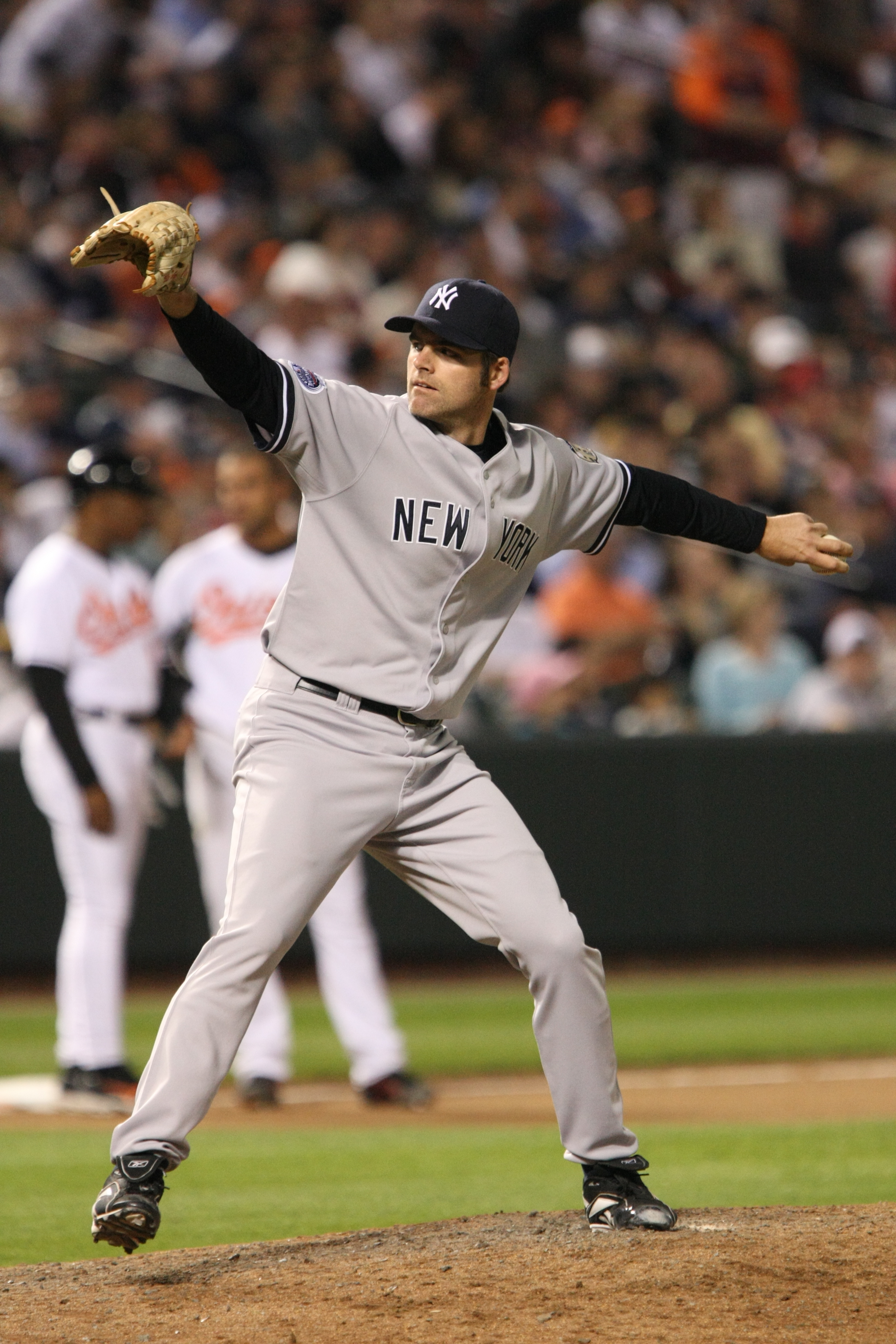
- Traber with the New York Yankees in 2008
- Pitcher
- Born: September 18, 1979 (age 46); Torrance, California, U.S.
- Batted: Left Threw: Left

MLB debut
- April 4, 2003, for the Cleveland Indians

Last MLB appearance
- August 6, 2009, for the Boston Red Sox

MLB statistics
- Win–loss record: 12–14
- Earned run average: 5.65
- Strikeouts: 152
- Stats at Baseball Reference

Teams
- Cleveland Indians (2003); Washington Nationals (2006–2007); New York Yankees (2008); Boston Red Sox (2009)

William Henry Traber, Jr. (born September 18, 1979) is an American former professional baseball pitcher. He played in Major League Baseball (MLB) for the Cleveland Indians, Washington Nationals, New York Yankees, and Boston Red Sox.

== Playing career ==
=== College ===
Traber attended Loyola Marymount University, where he was First-Team All-American and West Coast Conference Player of the Year. He set a single-season school strikeout record with 156 strikeouts (in 123 innings pitched).

In 2000, Traber entered the draft and was picked in the first round (16th overall) by the New York Mets. The Mets were prepared to offer Traber a contract worth $1.3 million, but after an MRI showed some damage to his pitching elbow, he signed a contract worth only $400,000.

=== Professional career ===
In 2001, the Mets traded Traber to the Cleveland Indians along with Matt Lawton, Alex Escobar, Earl Snyder, and Jerrod Riggan for Roberto Alomar, Mike Bacsik, and Danny Peoples.

In 2002, Traber was runner-up minor league pitcher of the year, going 17-5 for the Akron Aeros (Double-A) and Buffalo Bisons (Triple-A), and was voted by Baseball America as having the best control and curveball in the league. His numbers were also good enough to give him top-honors for Cleveland pitching prospects.

On April 4, 2003, Traber made his Major League debut. Although he started out well (1.59 ERA, 1-0 record in seven games that spring)—even pitching a one-hit shutout of the New York Yankees on July 8—Traber's season fell apart when elbow problems that haunted him in college and the minors came back to end his '03 campaign and ultimately the entire 2004 season when he needed Tommy John surgery.

During the 2004-2005 offseason, the Boston Red Sox signed Traber. Before playing a single game, he was placed on waivers by the Red Sox. On November 10, 2004, he was claimed by the Indians off waivers and was signed to a minor league deal on December 22, 2004.

On December 5, 2007, he was released by the Washington Nationals after having pitched for them the previous two seasons.

On January 5, 2008, he signed a minor league deal with the New York Yankees and was invited to spring training. On March 15, he was added to the 40-man roster and he opened the season in the Yankee bullpen. He spent much of the season splitting time between the Yankees and their Triple-A affiliate. He was designated for assignment on September 1. In December 2008, he signed a minor league contract with an invitation to spring training to return to the Red Sox.

On August 5, 2009, he was called up by the Red Sox to bolster their undermanned bullpen. In October 2009, Traber was granted free agency. He was designated for assignment on August 7, 2009. In June 2010, Traber was signed by the Seattle Mariners.

== Teaching career ==
He is currently the Head Varsity baseball Coach and a physics teacher at his former high school, El Segundo High School.
