= Graham Koonce =

American baseball player (born 1975)

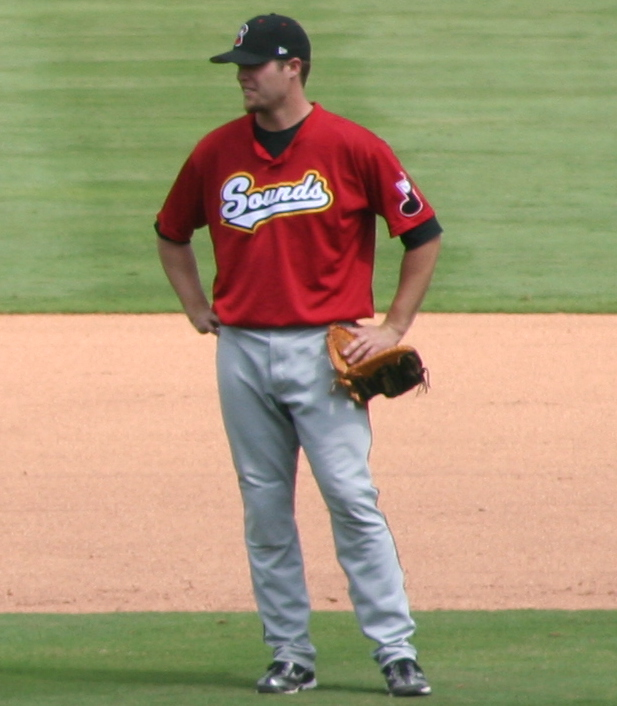
- Koonce with the Nashville Sounds in 2006
- First baseman
- Born: May 15, 1975 (age 50); El Cajon, California, U.S.
- Batted: Left Threw: Left

MLB debut
- September 20, 2003, for the Oakland Athletics

Last MLB appearance
- September 28, 2003, for the Oakland Athletics

MLB statistics
- Batting average: .125
- Runs: 0
- Hits: 1
- Stats at Baseball Reference

Teams
- Oakland Athletics (2003)

Graham Clinton Koonce (born May 15, 1975) is an American former professional baseball first baseman. He played in Major League Baseball for the Oakland Athletics during the 2003 season. He was selected by the Detroit Tigers in the 60th round of the 1993 amateur draft. Koonce played his first professional season with their Rookie league Bristol Tigers in 1994. In 2007, he played for the Kansas City Royals' Triple-A club, the Omaha Royals.
