= St. Clair Township, St. Clair County, Illinois =

Coordinates: 38°32′03″N 89°58′47″W

St. Clair Township
- Township
- Location in St. Clair County

- St. Clair County's location in Illinois
- Country: United States
- State: Illinois
- County: St. Clair
- Established: October 5, 1885

Area
  - Total: 20.52 sq mi (53.1 km^{2})
  - Land: 20.17 sq mi (52.2 km^{2})
  - Water: 0.35 sq mi (0.91 km^{2}) 1.71%

Population (2010)
  - Estimate (2016): 35,223
  - Density: 1,759.8/sq mi (679.5/km^{2})
- Time zone: UTC-6 (CST)
  - Summer (DST): UTC-5 (CDT)
- FIPS code: 17-163-66729

St. Clair Township is located in St. Clair County, Illinois. As of the 2010 census, its population was 35,498 and it contained 15,366 housing units. St. Clair Township formed from a portion of Belleville Township on October 5, 1885.

== Geography ==
According to the 2010 census, the township has a total area of 20.52 square miles (53.1 km^{2}), of which 20.17 square miles (52.2 km^{2}) (or 98.29%) is land and 0.35 square miles (0.91 km^{2}) (or 1.71%) is water.

== Demographics ==
Historical population
Census	Pop.	Note	%±
2016 (est.)	35,223
U.S. Decennial Census

== Notable person ==
- Jason Boyd, MLB pitcher for the Pittsburgh Pirates, Philadelphia Phillies, San Diego Padres and Cleveland Indians
