= 2003 Oakland Athletics season =

2003 Oakland Athletics
- American League West champions
- League: American League
- Division: West
- Ballpark: Network Associates Coliseum
- City: Oakland, California
- Record: 96–66 (.593)
- Divisional place: 1st
- Owners: Stephen Schott & Kenneth Hofmann
- General managers: Billy Beane
- Managers: Ken Macha
- Television: KICU-TV; FSN Bay Area (Ray Fosse, Greg Papa)
- Radio: KFRC (Bill King, Ken Korach, Ray Fosse)

The Oakland Athletics' 2003 season ended with the A's finishing first in the American League West with a record of 96 wins and 66 losses.

== Offseason ==
- December 15, 2002: Felipe López was traded as part of a 4-team trade by the Toronto Blue Jays to the Cincinnati Reds. The Oakland Athletics sent a player to be named later to the Toronto Blue Jays. The Arizona Diamondbacks sent Erubiel Durazo to the Oakland Athletics. The Cincinnati Reds sent Elmer Dessens and cash to the Arizona Diamondbacks. The Oakland Athletics sent Jason Arnold (minors) (December 16, 2002) to the Toronto Blue Jays to complete the trade.
- December 16, 2002: Neal Cotts was sent by the Oakland Athletics to the Chicago White Sox to complete an earlier deal made on December 3, 2002. The Oakland Athletics sent players to be named later and Billy Koch to the Chicago White Sox for Keith Foulke, Mark L. Johnson, Joe Valentine, and cash. The Oakland Athletics sent Neal Cotts (December 16, 2002) and Daylon Holt (minors) (December 16, 2002) to the Chicago White Sox to complete the trade.
- January 27, 2003: John-Ford Griffin was traded by the Oakland Athletics to the Toronto Blue Jays for a player to be named later. The Toronto Blue Jays sent Jason Perry (minors) (June 23, 2003) to the Oakland Athletics to complete the trade.

== Regular season ==
=== Season standings ===
AL West
| Team | W | L | Pct. | GB | Home | Road |
|---|---|---|---|---|---|---|
| Oakland Athletics | 96 | 66 | .593 | — | 57‍–‍24 | 39‍–‍42 |
| Seattle Mariners | 93 | 69 | .574 | 3 | 50‍–‍31 | 43‍–‍38 |
| Anaheim Angels | 77 | 85 | .475 | 19 | 45‍–‍37 | 32‍–‍48 |
| Texas Rangers | 71 | 91 | .438 | 25 | 43‍–‍38 | 28‍–‍53 |

=== Record vs. opponents ===
2003 American League record Source: MLB Standings Grid – 2003
| Team | ANA | BAL | BOS | CWS | CLE | DET | KC | MIN | NYY | OAK | SEA | TB | TEX | TOR | NL |
|---|---|---|---|---|---|---|---|---|---|---|---|---|---|---|---|
| Anaheim | — | 1–8 | 3–6 | 3–4 | 6–3 | 6–1 | 6–3 | 5–4 | 3–6 | 8–12 | 8–11 | 6–3 | 9–10 | 2–7 | 11–7 |
| Baltimore | 8–1 | — | 9–10 | 2–4 | 3–3 | 3–3 | 3–4 | 3–4 | 6–13–1 | 2–7 | 4–5 | 8–11 | 7–2 | 8–11 | 5–13 |
| Boston | 6–3 | 10–9 | — | 5–4 | 4–2 | 8–1 | 5–1 | 2–4 | 9–10 | 3–4 | 5–2 | 12–7 | 5–4 | 10–9 | 11–7 |
| Chicago | 4–3 | 4–2 | 4–5 | — | 11–8 | 11–8 | 11–8 | 9–10 | 4–2 | 4–5 | 2–7 | 3–3 | 3–4 | 6–3 | 10–8 |
| Cleveland | 3–6 | 3–3 | 2–4 | 8–11 | — | 12–7 | 6–13 | 9–10 | 2–5 | 3–6 | 3–6 | 5–2 | 4–5 | 2–4 | 6–12 |
| Detroit | 1–6 | 3–3 | 1–8 | 8–11 | 7–12 | — | 5–14 | 4–15 | 1–5 | 3–6 | 1–8 | 2–4 | 1–6 | 2–7 | 4–14 |
| Kansas City | 3–6 | 4–3 | 1–5 | 8–11 | 13–6 | 14–5 | — | 11–8 | 2–4 | 2–7 | 4–5 | 4–3 | 7–2 | 1–5 | 9–9 |
| Minnesota | 4–5 | 4–3 | 4–2 | 10–9 | 10–9 | 15–4 | 8–11 | — | 0–7 | 8–1 | 3–6 | 6–0 | 5–4 | 3–3 | 10–8 |
| New York | 6–3 | 13–6–1 | 10–9 | 2–4 | 5–2 | 5–1 | 4–2 | 7–0 | — | 3–6 | 5–4 | 14–5 | 4–5 | 10–9 | 13–5 |
| Oakland | 12–8 | 7–2 | 4–3 | 5–4 | 6–3 | 6–3 | 7–2 | 1–8 | 6–3 | — | 7–12 | 6–3 | 15–4 | 5–2 | 9–9 |
| Seattle | 11–8 | 5–4 | 2–5 | 7–2 | 6–3 | 8–1 | 5–4 | 6–3 | 4–5 | 12–7 | — | 4–5 | 10–10 | 3–4 | 10–8 |
| Tampa Bay | 3–6 | 11–8 | 7–12 | 3–3 | 2–5 | 4–2 | 3–4 | 0–6 | 5–14 | 3–6 | 5–4 | — | 3–6 | 11–8 | 3–15 |
| Texas | 10–9 | 2–7 | 4–5 | 4–3 | 5–4 | 6–1 | 2–7 | 4–5 | 5–4 | 4–15 | 10–10 | 6–3 | — | 5–4 | 4–14 |
| Toronto | 7–2 | 11–8 | 9–10 | 3–6 | 4–2 | 7–2 | 5–1 | 3–3 | 9–10 | 2–5 | 4–3 | 8–11 | 4–5 | — | 10–8 |

=== Transactions ===
- June 3, 2003: J.R. Towles was drafted by the Oakland Athletics in the 23rd round of the 2003 amateur draft, but did not sign.
- July 30, 2003: Aaron Harang was traded by the Oakland Athletics with Jeff Bruksch (minors) and Joe Valentine to the Cincinnati Reds for Jose Guillen.

=== Roster ===
2003 Oakland Athletics
Roster
| Pitchers: 57 Micah Bowie; 53 Chad Bradford; 58 Justin Duchscherer; 33 Jeremy Fikac; 29 Keith Foulke; 54 John Halama; 56 Aaron Harang; 16,40 Rich Harden; 32 Chad Harville; 15 Tim Hudson; 31 Ted Lilly; 45 Jim Mecir; 20 Mark Mulder; 49 Mike Neu; 73 Ricardo Rincón; 37 Steve Sparks; 51 Mike Wood; 75 Barry Zito | Catchers: 55 Ramón Hernández; 7 Mark Johnson; 17 Adam Melhuse; Infielders: 3 Eric Chavez; 8,7 Bobby Crosby; 44 Erubiel Durazo; 14 Mark Ellis; 50 Esteban Germán; 10 Scott Hatteberg; 18 Graham Koonce; 11 Frank Menechino; 4 Miguel Tejada | Outfielders: 22 Eric Byrnes; 24 Jermaine Dye; 21 Mike Edwards; 5 Ron Gant; 23 Jason Grabowski; 6 José Guillén; 12 Terrence Long; 8 David McCarty; 13 Billy McMillon; 8 Adam Piatt; 2 Chris Singleton | Manager: 39 Ken Macha; Coaches: 41 Thad Bosley (hitting); 35 Brad Fischer (first base); 47 Terry Francona (bench); 52 Bob Geren (bullpen); 46 Rick Peterson (pitching); 38 Ron Washington (third base) |

== Player stats ==
=== Batting ===
==== Starters by position ====
Note: Pos = Position; G = Games played; AB = At bats; H = Hits; Avg. = Batting average; HR = Home runs; RBI = Runs batted in

| Pos | Players | G | AB | H | Avg. | HR | RBI |
| C | Ramón Hernández | 140 | 483 | 132 | .273 | 21 | 78 |
| 1B | Scott Hatteberg | 147 | 541 | 137 | .253 | 12 | 61 |
| 2B | Mark Ellis | 154 | 553 | 137 | .248 | 9 | 52 |
| SS | Miguel Tejada | 162 | 636 | 177 | .278 | 27 | 106 |
| 3B | Eric Chavez | 154 | 588 | 166 | .282 | 29 | 101 |
| LF | Terrence Long | 140 | 486 | 119 | .245 | 14 | 61 |
| CF | Chris Singleton | 120 | 306 | 75 | .245 | 1 | 36 |
| RF | Jermaine Dye | 65 | 221 | 38 | .172 | 4 | 20 |
| DH | Erubiel Durazo | 154 | 537 | 139 | .259 | 21 | 77 |

==== Other batters ====
Note: G = Games played; AB = At bats; H = Hits; Avg. = Batting average; HR = Home runs; RBI = Runs batted in

| Player | G | AB | H | Avg. | HR | RBI |
| Eric Byrnes | 121 | 414 | 109 | .263 | 12 | 51 |
| José Guillén | 45 | 170 | 45 | .265 | 8 | 23 |
| Billy McMillon | 66 | 153 | 41 | .268 | 6 | 26 |
| Adam Piatt | 47 | 100 | 24 | .240 | 4 | 15 |
| Frank Menechino | 43 | 83 | 16 | .193 | 2 | 9 |
| Adam Melhuse | 40 | 77 | 23 | .299 | 5 | 14 |
| Ron Gant | 17 | 41 | 6 | .146 | 1 | 4 |
| Mark Johnson | 13 | 27 | 3 | .111 | 0 | 3 |
| Dave McCarty | 8 | 26 | 7 | .269 | 0 | 2 |
| Bobby Crosby | 11 | 12 | 0 | .000 | 0 | 0 |
| Jason Grabowski | 8 | 8 | 0 | .000 | 0 | 0 |
| Graham Koonce | 6 | 8 | 1 | .125 | 0 | 0 |
| Mike Edwards | 4 | 4 | 1 | .250 | 0 | 0 |
| Esteban Germán | 5 | 4 | 1 | .250 | 0 | 1 |

=== Pitching ===
==== Starting pitchers ====
Note: G = Games pitched; IP = Innings pitched; W = Wins; L = Losses; ERA = Earned run average; SO = Strikeouts

| Player | G | IP | W | L | ERA | SO |
| Tim Hudson | 34 | 240.0 | 16 | 7 | 2.70 | 162 |
| Barry Zito | 35 | 231.2 | 14 | 12 | 3.30 | 146 |
| Mark Mulder | 26 | 186.2 | 15 | 9 | 3.13 | 128 |
| Ted Lilly | 32 | 178.1 | 12 | 10 | 4.34 | 147 |
| Rich Harden | 15 | 74.2 | 5 | 4 | 4.46 | 67 |

==== Other pitchers ====
Note: G = Games pitched; IP = Innings pitched; W = Wins; L = Losses; ERA = Earned run average; SO = Strikeouts

| Player | G | IP | W | L | ERA | SO |
| John Halama | 35 | 108.2 | 3 | 5 | 4.22 | 51 |
| Aaron Harang | 7 | 30.1 | 1 | 3 | 5.34 | 16 |
| Justin Duchscherer | 4 | 16.1 | 1 | 1 | 3.31 | 15 |
| Mike Wood | 7 | 13.2 | 2 | 1 | 10.54 | 15 |

==== Relief pitchers ====
Note: G = Games pitched; W = Wins; L = Losses; SV = Saves; ERA = Earned run average; SO = Strikeouts

| Player | G | W | L | SV | ERA | SO |
| Keith Foulke | 72 | 9 | 1 | 43 | 2.08 | 88 |
| Chad Bradford | 72 | 7 | 4 | 2 | 3.04 | 62 |
| Ricardo Rincón | 64 | 8 | 4 | 0 | 3.25 | 40 |
| Jim Mecir | 41 | 2 | 3 | 1 | 5.59 | 25 |
| Mike Neu | 32 | 0 | 0 | 1 | 3.64 | 20 |
| Chad Harville | 21 | 1 | 0 | 1 | 5.82 | 18 |
| Jeremy Fikac | 14 | 0 | 1 | 0 | 4.50 | 9 |
| Steve Sparks | 9 | 0 | 0 | 0 | 5.71 | 5 |
| Micah Bowie | 6 | 0 | 1 | 0 | 7.56 | 4 |

== Postseason ==
=== 2003 ALDS ===
Game 1: Oakland 5 – Boston 4.

Game 2: Oakland 5 – Boston 1.

Game 3: Boston 3 – Oakland 1.

Game 4: Boston 5 – Oakland 4.

Game 5: Boston 4 – Oakland 3.

== Farm system ==
| Level | Team | League | Manager |
|---|---|---|---|
| AAA | Sacramento River Cats | Pacific Coast League | Tony DeFrancesco |
| AA | Midland RockHounds | Texas League | Greg Sparks |
| A | Modesto A's | California League | Rick Rodriguez |
| A | Kane County Cougars | Midwest League | Webster Garrison |
| A-Short Season | Vancouver Canadians | Northwest League | Dennis Rogers |
| Rookie | AZL Athletics | Arizona League | Ruben Escalera |

LEAGUE CHAMPIONS: Sacramento
