= Aaron Looper =

American baseball player (born 1976)

- Relief pitcher
- Born: September 7, 1976 (age 49); Ada, Oklahoma, U.S.
- Batted: Right Threw: Right

MLB debut
- August 2, 2003, for the Seattle Mariners

Last MLB appearance
- September 28, 2003, for the Seattle Mariners

MLB statistics
- Win–loss record: 0–0
- Earned run average: 5.14
- Strikeouts: 6
- Stats at Baseball Reference

Teams
- Seattle Mariners (2003)

Aaron Joseph Looper (born September 7, 1976) is an American former Major League Baseball relief pitcher and current scout who pitched in six games for the Seattle Mariners in 2003.

Looper played college baseball at Indian Hills Community College and for the Oklahoma Sooners, where he had a 7.43 earned run average in 18 games in 1996. The Mariners selected him in the 30th round of the 1997 MLB draft. He was named the team's minor league co-pitcher of the year in 2002, while in Double-A. He threw a 98 mile-per-hour fastball in Double-A.

The Mariners called up Looper on August 2, 2003, making him MLB debut that night, pitching a scoreless inning. He gave up three runs in 2 1/3 innings in his second outing and was sent down to the minors, later returning as a September call-up. He allowed one run in 3 1/3 innings in four games in his final month in the majors.

Looper and Ryan Ketchner were traded to the Los Angeles Dodgers for Jolbert Cabrera in April 2004. The Dodgers quickly designated Looper for assignment, then traded him back to Seattle for Glenn Bott. Looper pitched three more seasons in the minors in the Mariners system. He then started one game for the independent New Jersey Jackals of the Can-Am League in 2007.

After his playing career, Looper has been a scout for the St. Louis Cardinals organization who helped the team draft reliever Trevor Rosenthal. As of 2026, Looper's job title is national crosschecker.

== Personal life ==
Looper is the cousin of former MLB pitcher Braden Looper. His father, Benny, was the Mariners' vice president of player development and scouting.

Looper resides in Shawnee, Oklahoma. He and his wife have a child.
