= Ricardo Rodríguez (baseball, born 1978) =

Dominican baseball player

Ricardo Rodriguez
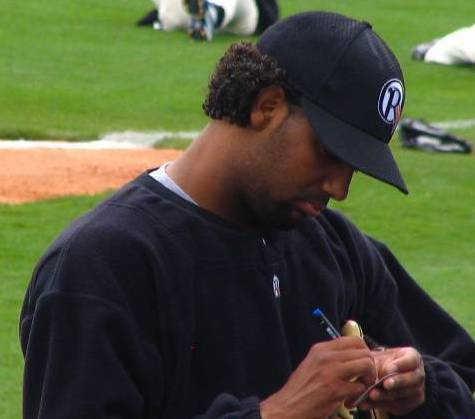
- Rodríguez with the Oklahoma Redhawks in 2005
- Pitcher
- Born: May 21, 1978 (age 47); Guayubín, Dominican Republic
- Batted: Left Threw: Right

MLB debut
- August 21, 2002, for the Cleveland Indians

Last MLB appearance
- August 8, 2005, for the Texas Rangers

MLB statistics
- Win–loss record: 10–15
- Earned run average: 5.18
- Strikeouts: 104
- Stats at Baseball Reference

Teams
- Cleveland Indians (2002–2003); Texas Rangers (2004–2005); Sinon Bulls (2009); Kia Tigers (2010)

Ricardo Antonio Rodríguez (born May 21, 1978) is a Dominican former professional baseball pitcher. He played in Major League Baseball (MLB) and the KBO League (KBO) during his career.

== Career ==
In a four-season career, Rodríguez has posted a 10–15 record with 104 strikeouts and a 5.18 ERA in 206 2/3 innings, including one complete game and a shutout.

Rodríguez was invited by the Florida Marlins as a non-roster invitee to spring training in 2007, but did not make the team, instead playing for their Triple-A affiliate, the Albuquerque Isotopes, and Pittsburgh's Triple-A affiliate, the Indianapolis Indians.

On June 17, 2008, Rodríguez signed with the Edmonton Cracker Cats of the Golden Baseball League.

On January 21, 2010, Rodríguez signed with Kia Tigers of the KBO League, but on March 19 he was released from Kia because of an elbow injury. He was featured in the 2004 PBS documentary The New Americans as he left the Dominican Republic in hopes of playing baseball in the United States.
