= Jerrod Riggan =

American baseball player (born 1974)

- Pitcher
- Born: May 16, 1974 (age 52); Brewster, Washington, U.S.
- Batted: Right Threw: Right

Professional debut
- MLB: August 29, 2000, for the New York Mets
- NPB: June 27, 2003, for the Hanshin Tigers

Last appearance
- MLB: May 15, 2003, for the Cleveland Indians
- NPB: June 16, 2004, for the Hanshin Tigers

MLB statistics
- Win–loss record: 5–4
- Earned run average: 5.19
- Strikeouts: 66

NPB statistics
- Win–loss record: 4–1
- Earned run average: 2.07
- Strikeouts: 44
- Stats at Baseball Reference

Teams
- New York Mets (2000–2001); Cleveland Indians (2002–2003); Hanshin Tigers (2003–2004)

Jerrod Ashley Riggan (born May 16, 1974) is an American former professional baseball player. A pitcher, Riggan played in Major League Baseball (MLB) and Nippon Professional Baseball (NPB).

== Amateur career ==
Riggan played baseball and basketball at Brewster High School in Brewster, Washington, from which he graduated in 1992. He was also his class president.

After high school, Riggan attended Edmonds Community College where he started as a shortstop and pitcher on the college baseball team and shooting guard on the college basketball team. At Edmonds, Riggan took a line drive to the head and wore a batting helmet while pitching for the following year. Riggan continued his college baseball career at San Diego State. He was selected in the thirteenth round of the 1995 Major League Baseball draft by the Florida Marlins but did not sign. As a senior at San Diego State, he was a co-captain with Travis Lee. He was selected by the California Angels in the eighth round of the 1996 draft.

== Professional career ==
After two years of moderate success as a starting pitcher in the Angels' farm system, Riggan was informed during spring training in 1998 that the Angels would be demoting him to convert him to a relief pitcher. Riggan asked for his release and the Angels responded by suspending him indefinitely. The Angels eventually agreed to release Riggan in April 1998. He subsequently landed a contract with the New York Mets after seeing an ad in The Wenatchee World for an open tryout in Yakima, Washington.

Riggan was called up to the majors for the first time in August 2000 following an injury to Mets reliever John Franco. The Mets intended to add Eric Cammack to the roster but he was unable to make it due to bad weather in Norfolk, Virginia. Riggan, who was playing for the Binghamton Mets at the time, did not have the same problem. He made his Major League debut on August 29, pitching two scoreless relief innings against the Houston Astros. The following day, he was demoted to Triple-A and replaced on the roster by Timo Perez. He would not appear in another Major League game that season.

Riggan began the 2001 season in the minor leagues but was on the Major League roster for four separate stints in the first half of the season alone: April 28–30, May 1–17, May 27 – June 6 and June 24–25. On July 22, he was recalled for a fifth time to replace pitcher Donne Wall on the roster. He would be a regular out of the Mets' bullpen for the remainder of the season. He earned his first Major League win on August 18, 2001, pitching a perfect inning against the Los Angeles Dodgers at Dodger Stadium. According to Riggan, team officials told him that he had been mentioned in trade talks several times during the 2001 season but the team vetoed those offers because they could not be convinced to part with him.

In spite of that, on December 11, 2001, he was traded to the Cleveland Indians along with Alex Escobar, Matt Lawton and players to be named later in exchange for future Hall of Famer Roberto Alomar, Mike Bacsik and a minor leaguer. Indians general manager Mark Shapiro later said that he would not have made the deal if it had not included Riggan. At the time, he said that he was "glad" to join a contending team and "excited about joining their staff." However, after his retirement, he said that his "heart sunk" when he heard about the trade and that it felt as if his "balloon was deflated." The trade affected his attitude going forward and he said in retrospect that he had "jinxed" himself from then on.

Riggan began the 2002 season on Cleveland's active roster but was demoted on April 24 and replaced on the roster by pitcher Chad Paronto after, according to Christina Kahrl, "giving up baserunners hand over fist." He was recalled on June 13 following an injury to pitcher Paul Shuey but sent back down on July 6 to make room on the roster for pitcher Jason Phillips. On August 15, he once again returned to the roster along with pitcher David Riske and appeared regularly in relief for the remainder of the season.

In 2003, Riggan failed to make Cleveland's roster out of spring training. He was called up to the majors on May 13 after Travis Hafner suffered a broken toe. He was designated for assignment by the Indians on May 18 after getting hit hard in two relief appearances. Riggan subsequently refused the minor league assignment and was granted free agency. On May 25, the Mets signed him to a minor league contract.

In June 2003, Riggan was granted a release by the Mets to sign a seven-figure contract with the Hanshin Tigers for the remainder of the 2003 NPB season and the entirety of the following year. He pitched for the Tigers in the Japan Series that year. In his second season with Hanshin, Riggan blew out his elbow and underwent Tommy John surgery on June 29, 2004.

In 2005, Riggan returned to the Mets' minor league system. On June 27, 2005, he appeared in a game for the Gulf Coast Mets, almost a year after his surgery. Riggan would reach as high as Double-A but no higher. It would be his final season in professional baseball.

== Personal life ==
Riggan's parents are Jerry and Camille Riggan. He had at least one sibling, a brother named Nate.

Riggan and his wife, Jennifer, had sons named Turk, Moxon and Jace and a daughter named Lila who was born in 2011. Turk, the oldest, was named after Riggan's former Mets teammate, Turk Wendell.

Riggan has served as the head baseball coach at Brewster High School and pitching coach for the Alaska Goldpanners.
