= Jason Boyd (baseball) =

American baseball player (born 1973)

- Pitcher
- Born: February 23, 1973 (age 53); St. Clair, Illinois, U.S.
- Batted: Right Threw: Right

MLB debut
- September 10, 1999, for the Pittsburgh Pirates

Last MLB appearance
- May 13, 2004, for the Pittsburgh Pirates

MLB statistics
- Win–loss record: 5–2
- Earned run average: 5.74
- Strikeouts: 97
- Stats at Baseball Reference

Teams
- Pittsburgh Pirates (1999); Philadelphia Phillies (2000); San Diego Padres (2002); Cleveland Indians (2003); Pittsburgh Pirates (2004)

Jason Pernell Boyd (born February 23, 1973) is an American former professional baseball pitcher who played in Major League Baseball (MLB) for the Pittsburgh Pirates, Philadelphia Phillies, San Diego Padres and Cleveland Indians.
