= Danys Báez =

Cuban baseball player (born 1977)

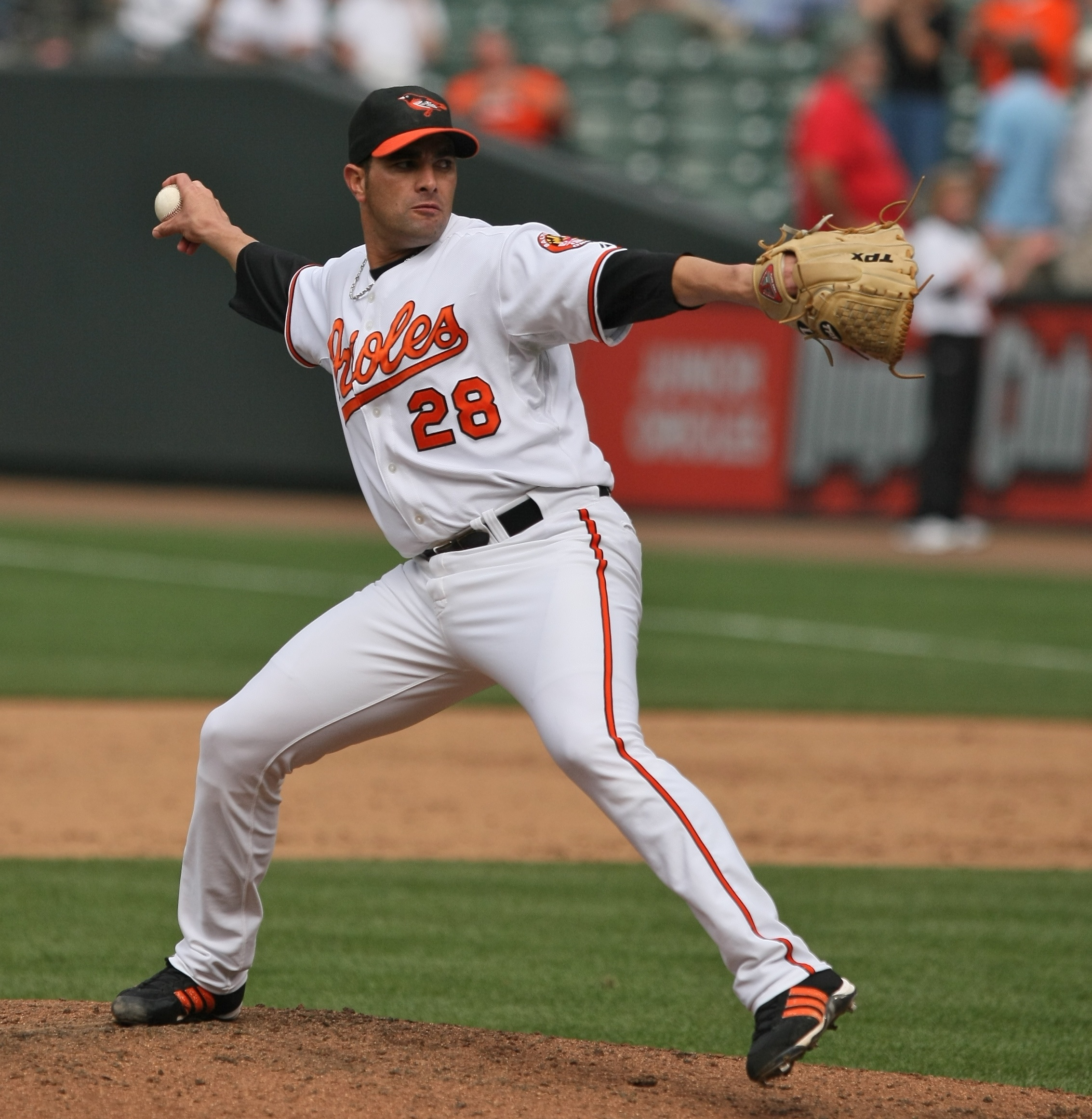
- Báez with the Baltimore Orioles
- Pitcher
- Born: September 10, 1977 (age 49); Pinar del Río, Cuba
- Batted: Right Threw: Right

MLB debut
- May 13, 2001, for the Cleveland Indians

Last MLB appearance
- July 16, 2011, for the Philadelphia Phillies

MLB statistics
- Win–loss record: 40–57
- Earned run average: 4.25
- Strikeouts: 505
- Saves: 114
- Stats at Baseball Reference

Teams
- Cleveland Indians (2001–2003); Tampa Bay Devil Rays (2004–2005); Los Angeles Dodgers (2006); Atlanta Braves (2006); Baltimore Orioles (2007, 2009); Philadelphia Phillies (2010–2011)

Career highlights and awards
- All-Star (2005)
Medals
Men's baseball
Representing Cuba
Pan American Games
Gold medal – first place	1999 Winnipeg	Team competition

Danys Báez González (/ˈdæni ˈbaɪɛz/; Spanish: [ˈdanis ˈβaes]; born September 10, 1977) is a Cuban-American former professional baseball pitcher. Báez played in Major League Baseball (MLB) for the Cleveland Indians, Tampa Bay Devil Rays, Los Angeles Dodgers, Atlanta Braves, Baltimore Orioles, and Philadelphia Phillies.

== Professional career ==
=== Cleveland Indians ===
Báez was signed by the Cleveland Indians in 1999. In his second season, he played for both the Indians and the Triple-A Buffalo Bisons. In his debut, he went a scoreless inning against the Tampa Bay Devil Rays. Over the rest of the year, he went 5–3 with a 2.91 ERA.

In 2002, Báez was moved into the starting rotation of the Indians. He won his first start on April 5 of that year facing the Detroit Tigers. In 26 starts, he went 9–10 with a 4.44 ERA. He was given the role of closer in August, where he finished off the season.

Báez pitched for the Indians as a reliever in 2003. He was both a setup man and a closer that season. He had 25 saves and 10 blown saves, which was tied for the most in the Major Leagues.

=== Tampa Bay Devil Rays ===
Báez signed as a free agent with the Tampa Bay Devil Rays and was their full-time closer in 2004. He was 30 for 33 in save chances, which was a career high and seventh best in the Major Leagues. He was traded to the Los Angeles Dodgers January 14, 2006 along with Lance Carter for Edwin Jackson and Chuck Tiffany. The Dodgers intended Báez to serve as a closer until the injured Éric Gagné was healthy, but he was removed from the role in May after blowing four saves in four chances.

=== Atlanta Braves ===
Báez was traded to the Braves on July 28, 2006, along with infielder Willy Aybar in exchange for shortstop/third baseman Wilson Betemit. While in Atlanta, he was the set-up man for the Braves' newly acquired closer Bob Wickman.

=== Baltimore Orioles ===
Báez signed a three-year deal with the Orioles on November 26, 2006. He served as the set-up man for Orioles' closing pitcher Chris Ray, but became the closer after Ray suffered a season-ending injury in late July. On March 29, 2008, Baez was placed on the disabled list after undergoing Tommy John surgery and missed the entire 2008 season.

Báez returned from elbow surgery the following year with a good start to the season. On May 22, 2009, Báez got his first major league hit off the Nationals Kip Wells.

=== Philadelphia Phillies ===
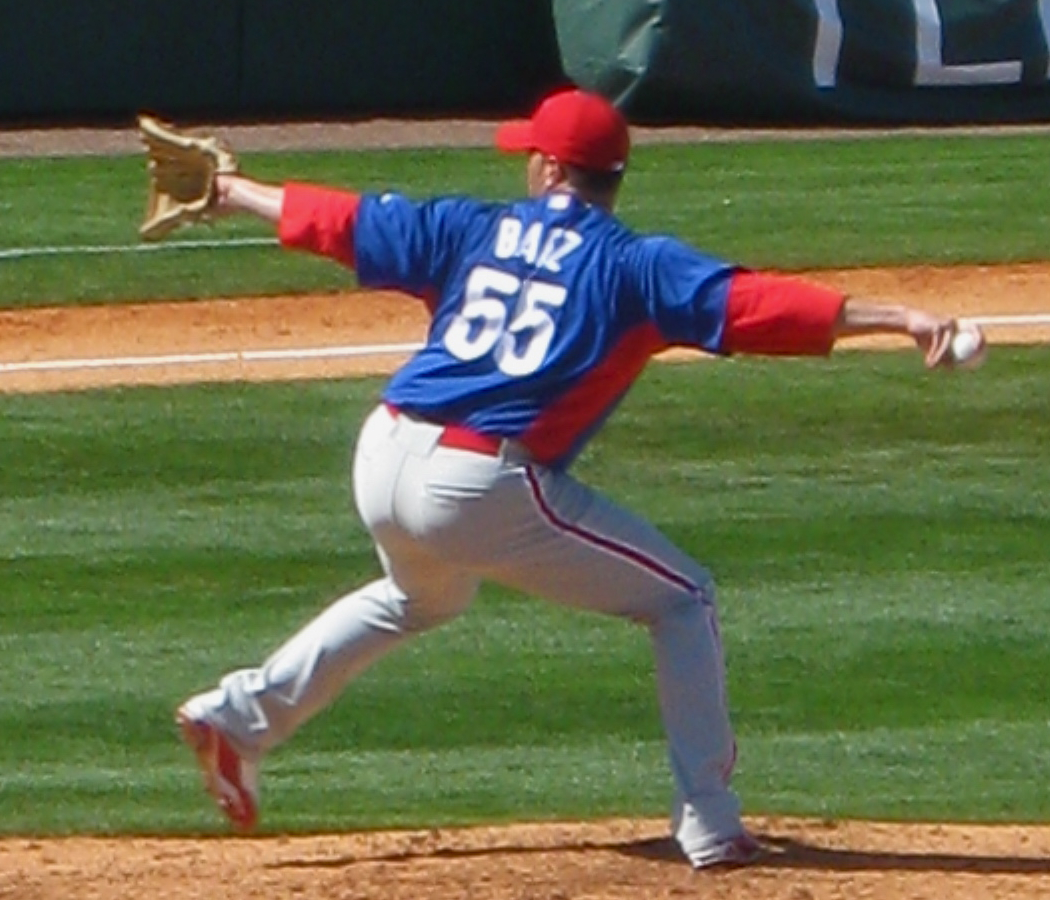
Báez with the Phillies in 2010

On December 31, 2009, Baez agreed in principle to a contract with the Philadelphia Phillies, which was officially announced on Tuesday, January 5, 2010. In 2010, Baez made 51 appearances for the Phillies, recording a 5.48 ERA.

Baez made 29 appearances for Philadelphia in 2011, recording a 6.25 ERA before being designated for assignment on July 22. On August 1, he was released.

=== Retirement ===
Baez announced his retirement from baseball on February 27, 2012.

== Personal life ==
Báez defected from the Cuban national team at the 1999 Pan American Games in Winnipeg, Manitoba. His parents followed him to the United States five years later.

== See also ==
- List of baseball players who defected from Cuba
