= Jason Davis (baseball) =

American baseball player (born 1980)

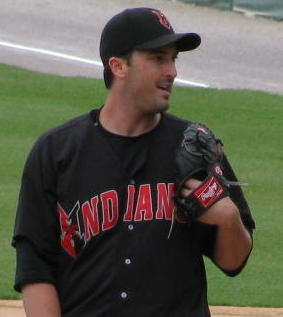
- Davis with the Indianapolis Indians in 2009
- Pitcher
- Born: May 8, 1980 (age 46); Chattanooga, Tennessee, U.S.
- Batted: Right Threw: Right

MLB debut
- September 9, 2002, for the Cleveland Indians

Last MLB appearance
- September 20, 2008, for the Pittsburgh Pirates

MLB statistics
- Win–loss record: 22–26
- Earned run average: 4.82
- Strikeouts: 269
- Stats at Baseball Reference

Teams
- Cleveland Indians (2002–2007); Seattle Mariners (2007); Pittsburgh Pirates (2008)

Jason Thomas Davis (born May 8, 1980) is a former Major League Baseball right-handed pitcher. He played in MLB for the Cleveland Indians, Seattle Mariners and Pittsburgh Pirates.

== Professional career ==
=== Cleveland Indians ===
Davis attended Cleveland State Community College, was drafted by the Cleveland Indians in the 21st round of the 1999 Major League Baseball draft, and signed May 18, 2000. He spent his first season as a professional in with the Rookie-level Burlington Athletics, making 10 starts going 4–4 with a 4.40 ERA.

Davis elevated himself to prospect status in 2001, going 14–6 with a 2.70 ERA in 27 starts at Class-A Columbus RedStixx of the South Atlantic League. He led the club in wins, which finished tied for third in the league. His 2.70 ERA was also the seventh lowest mark in the league as he also finished tied for fourth with 27 starts.

In 2002 Davis had a breakout season, beginning the year with the Class-A Kinston Indians of the Carolina League before compiling an impressive ERA of 1.84 in three outings with Cleveland to end the season. Davis began the season at Kinston, losing five of his first six decisions through June 3. He tossed a four-hit, complete game nine inning shutout on June 8. Over his last five starts at Kinston he was 2–1 with a 3.15 ERA and was promoted to the Double-A Akron Aeros for the second half of the season on July 10. He got off to a shaky start in with Akron, going 1–2 with a 5.40 ERA in four starts. Over his last five Akron starts, Davis was 5–0 with a 1.17 ERA. He was promoted to the big leagues on September 9 when his contract was purchased from Akron after the Aeros were eliminated from the playoffs. He made his Major League debut that night in relief of Jaret Wright against the Toronto Blue Jays tossing four innings, and giving up one run, yielding a solo home run to Eric Hinske. Davis made his first major league start on September 14 against the Minnesota Twins and did not get a decision in the 3-2 Twins win. He picked up his first major league win on September 20 against the Kansas City Royals in a 6–2 win.

Davis was one of the Indians' most consistent and durable starting pitchers, spending his first full season in the big leagues in 2003. He led all American League rookie pitchers with 165-and-one-third innings pitched. Davis also finished sixth among AL rookie pitchers in strikeouts with 85, third in starts with 27, second in ERA with a 4.68 clip and tied for fourth in wins with eight. He pitched the first complete game of his Major League career in start against the Detroit Tigers on June 18.

He spent the first half of the 2004 season in the a starting role before a trip to Buffalo and successful transition to the bullpen turned around his season. He was converted to relief after his final start of September 4 against the Anaheim Angels.

Davis enjoyed four stints with the big league club in 2005 and spent the remainder of his time in the Triple-A Buffalo Bisons' rotation.

In 2006 Davis spent the entire season in relief for the first time in his career. He allowed only 1 home run in 55 1/3 innings pitched. He was optioned to Triple-A Buffalo out of spring training but was recalled two days later after CC Sabathia was injured on opening night. Davis went 2–1 with a 5.04 ERA in 21 outings before being optioned to Buffalo on June 13. Davis spent 5 weeks in Buffalo where he was 0–2 with 4 saves and a 0.54 ERA in 11 relief appearances, limiting Triple-A hitters to a .138 average against him. He was recalled on July 21 after Bob Wickman was traded. Over his second stint with Cleveland he was 1–1 with a 2.16 ERA in 18 outings and on the year 24 of his 39 outings were scoreless. Davis earned his first career save on August 3 against the Boston Red Sox.

Davis began the 2007 season with Cleveland, making eight relief appearances with no record and a 4.76 ERA.

=== Seattle Mariners ===
He was traded to the Seattle Mariners from Cleveland on May 13, 2007, for a player to be named later. Davis made 16 relief appearances going 2–0 with a 6.31 ERA in 25 2/3 innings. He was later reassigned to the Triple-A Tacoma Rainiers, made five starts from July 24 to August 16, going 0–2 with a 7.11 ERA in 25 1/3 innings. He allowed a .346 average in Triple-A, including a .458 average to leadoff hitters.

=== Pittsburgh Pirates ===
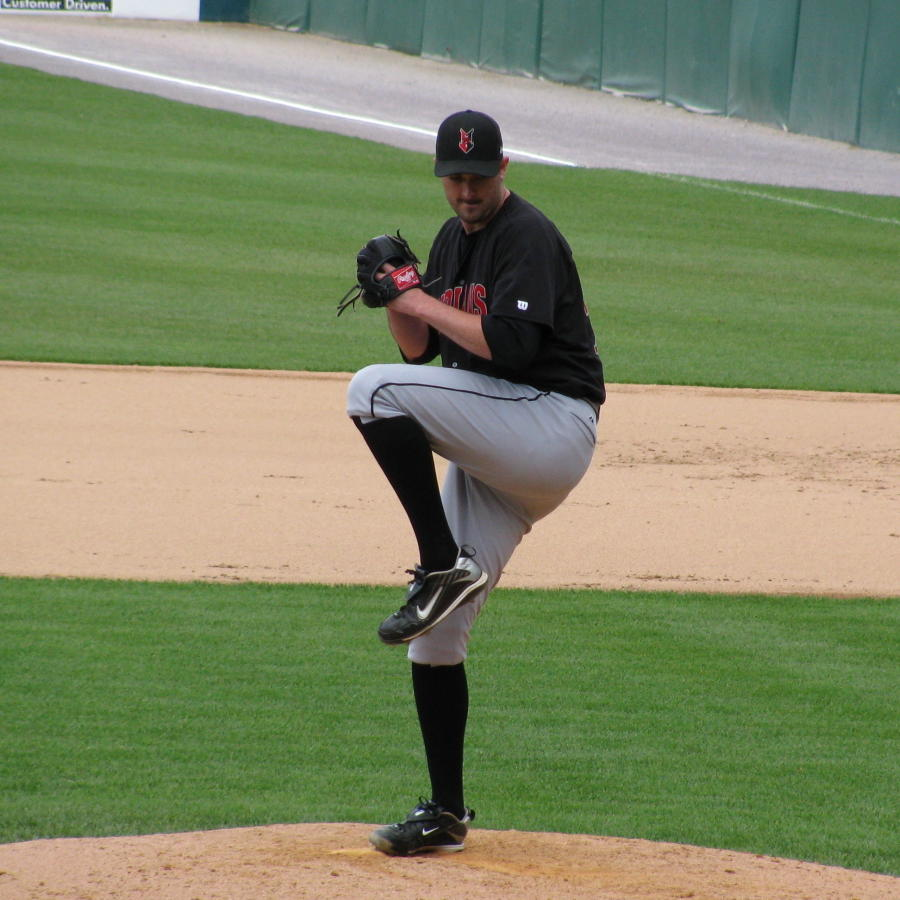
Jason Davis pitching for the Indians

After the 2007 season, Davis elected for free agency and signed a minor league contract with the Texas Rangers. He was released on March 27, 2008. On March 30, Davis signed a minor league contract with the Pittsburgh Pirates and he began the season in the rotation at Triple-A Indianapolis Indians, going 6–9 with a 4.41 ERA in 21 games, 20 starts. Davis went a season-high eight innings to win his final Triple-A start against the Charlotte Knights on July 22, allowing two runs on seven hits. He was called up to Pittsburgh where he made appearances, going 2–4 with a 5.29 ERA in 34 innings. Davis made his first start against the Philadelphia Phillies on August 10, holding the Phillies to no earned runs on four hits and four walks over six innings. He declined a minor league assignment on December 10, 2008, becoming a free agent. He had been mentioned as possibly going to pitch in Japan, but instead re-signed with the Pirates.

== Personal life ==
In Davis's spare time, he pursues an interest in taxidermy. His home was filled with trophies that he hunted and then stuffed and mounted himself, including the heads of 21 deer.
