= Jason Phillips (pitcher) =

American baseball player (born 1974)

- Pitcher
- Born: March 22, 1974 (age 52); Williamsport, Pennsylvania, U.S.
- Batted: Right Threw: Right

MLB debut
- April 5, 1999, for the Pittsburgh Pirates

Last MLB appearance
- May 24, 2003, for the Cleveland Indians

MLB statistics
- Win–loss record: 1–4
- Earned run average: 6.20
- Strikeouts: 32
- Stats at Baseball Reference

Teams
- Pittsburgh Pirates (1999); Cleveland Indians (2002–2003); Orix BlueWave (2003–2004)

Jason Phillips
Medal record

Men's baseball

Representing United States

Baseball World Cup
Silver medal – second place	2001 Taipei	National team

Jason Charles Phillips (born March 22, 1974) is an American former professional baseball pitcher. He played in Major League Baseball (MLB) for the Pittsburgh Pirates in 1999 and the Cleveland Indians in 2002 and 2003. Phillips batted and threw right-handed.

In a three-season career, Phillips posted a 1–4 record with a 6.20 ERA, 32 strikeouts and 53 2/3 innings in 50 games pitched, six as a starter. After his major league career, Phillips pitched parts of two seasons (2003-2004) in Japan for the Orix BlueWave.
