= Zach Sorensen =

American baseball player (born 1977)

- Infielder
- Born: January 3, 1977 (age 49); Salt Lake City, Utah, U.S.
- Batted: Switch Threw: Right

MLB debut
- June 3, 2003, for the Cleveland Indians

Last MLB appearance
- October 2, 2005, for the Anaheim Angels

MLB statistics
- Batting average: .143
- Home runs: 1
- Runs batted in: 2
- Stats at Baseball Reference

Teams
- Cleveland Indians (2003); Los Angeles Angels of Anaheim (2005)

Zach Sorensen
Medal record

Men's baseball

Representing United States

Baseball World Cup
Silver medal – second place	2001 Taipei	National team

Zach Hart Sorensen (born January 3, 1977) is an American former Major League Baseball second baseman and shortstop.

Drafted by the Cleveland Indians in the 2nd round of the 1998 amateur draft, Sorensen would make his Major League Baseball debut with the Indians on June 3, 2003. In 2005, Sorensen played 12 games in the majors for the Los Angeles Angels of Anaheim.

In 2007, Sorensen played for the Albuquerque Isotopes, the Triple-A affiliate of the Florida Marlins, before retiring on April 22, 2007.
