= Alex Escobar =

Venezuelan baseball player (born 1978)

- Outfielder
- Born: September 6, 1978 (age 47); Valencia, Carabobo, Venezuela
- Batted: Right Threw: Right

MLB debut
- May 8, 2001, for the New York Mets

Last MLB appearance
- August 25, 2006, for the Washington Nationals

MLB statistics
- Batting average: .258
- Home runs: 13
- Runs batted in: 52
- Stats at Baseball Reference

Teams
- New York Mets (2001); Cleveland Indians (2003–2004); Washington Nationals (2006)

Alexander José Escobar [ess-COE-bar] (born September 6, 1978) is a Venezuelan former professional baseball outfielder. He played in Major League Baseball (MLB) for the New York Mets, Cleveland Indians, and Washington Nationals.

== Career ==
Escobar was signed by the Mets as a non-draft amateur free agent in 1995 and made his debut in 2001. At the end of the season, he was traded to the Indians as part of an eight-player deal that sent Roberto Alomar to the Mets. Escobar missed the entire 2002 season after tearing his left anterior cruciate ligament (ACL) during Spring Training. In 2003, he recovered from a slow start at Triple-A Buffalo Bisons and played 28 games, collecting 24 home runs and 78 runs batted in.

In the minors, Escobar was an All-Star in the 'AAA' International, 'AA' Eastern, and 'AA' South Atlantic leagues. He also was selected by Baseball America to join the 1998 All-Stars team.

Escobar was demoted by the Nationals during spring training after hitting just .103 (3-for-29) with two RBIs. He said he was not getting enough playing time in spring training. "I'm not swinging the bat. I have to work my way back," Escobar said. "I'm getting used to being on the field every day. It's a combination of everything." Baseball America rated him as a top prospect for three years.

== See also ==
- List of players from Venezuela in Major League Baseball
