= 2003 Detroit Tigers season =

Major League Baseball season

2003 Detroit Tigers
- League: American League
- Division: Central
- Ballpark: Comerica Park
- City: Detroit
- Record: 43–119 (.265)
- Divisional place: 5th
- Owners: Mike Ilitch
- General managers: Dave Dombrowski
- Managers: Alan Trammell
- Television: WKBD (Frank Beckmann, Jack Morris); FSN Detroit (Mario Impemba, Rod Allen)
- Radio: WXYT (AM) (Jim Price, Dan Dickerson)

The 2003 Detroit Tigers season was the team's 103rd season and fourth at Comerica Park. In one of the worst MLB seasons in the modern era since the 1962 New York Mets, the team finished with a record of 43–119, which surpassed the 1916 Philadelphia Athletics for the most losses in American League history (though not for the worst winning percentage) and came within one loss of tying the 1962 Mets of the National League for the most losses in modern major league history at the time. The team's 119 losses were the second most in the modern era and became the third most when the 2024 Chicago White Sox lost their 121st game to the Tigers' 2024 team, surpassing the 1962 Mets. The 2003 Tigers were also the only team to hold the record of 119 losses until the 2025 Colorado Rockies tied this record. During this historically poor season, the Tigers were nicknamed the "Motor City Kitties."

The Tigers were outscored by 337 runs over the course of the season (928 to 591) and finished 47 games behind the Minnesota Twins. They were swept a total of 21 times while notching only eight series victories (by any margin) of their own. They were eliminated from playoff contention on August 22, the earliest elimination in the divisional era at the time, since surpassed by the 2018 Baltimore Orioles and 2024 Chicago White Sox.

Blame for the dismal season was shared by both the pitching staff, which had an ERA of 5.30, and the batters, who finished with a team batting average of .240, 19 points below the American League's .259 batting average. However, 2003 was a nadir from which the Tigers recovered remarkably quickly, making the World Series in 2006 and avoiding another 100-loss season until 2019.

== Season overview ==
Reeling from yet another terrible season in 2002, Tigers management found themselves in a big hole: a farm system that wasn't producing, a big-league club with major deficiencies, and contracts being paid to veterans not playing to expectations; those who did produce – Juan Acevedo, Randall Simon, and Robert Fick - did not return for 2003. Leading the team was first-year manager, former Tigers shortstop, and future Hall of Famer Alan Trammell, who had a dilemma nearly everywhere on the roster, particularly the starting rotation. Gary Knotts, who had pitched mostly in relief in his career, was to be converted to a starting role; Detroit area native Steve Avery was looking to make a comeback after not pitching in two years; two untested rookies, Jeremy Bonderman – drafted straight out of high school – and Nate Robertson - acquired in a trade for Mark Redman to the Florida Marlins – also vied for their chances to make the big-league rotation.

The results were disastrous. The Tigers lost their first nine games, won their first against the Chicago White Sox on April 12, then proceeded to drop eight in a row to fall to 1–17. An almost non-existent offense accounted for most of the team's early season problems, batting just .228 as a team in the first half. To the surprise of many, their young corps of pitchers were performing better than expected and remained durable as the team struggled to score runs and the losses continued to pile up – 18 in May, 22 in June – with no reason to expect any change in fortune.

By the end of May, the Tigers were 14–39, 16.5 games out of first, and their season was all but finished. On August 30, after a 5–2 loss to the White Sox, the Tigers had lost 100 games for the second straight season; furthermore, they were gaining nationwide attention as they seemed a sure bet to break the infamous 1962 Mets' record for most losses in a season. Looking for a spark from the farm system, players were constantly being shuffled back and forth between Detroit and nearby Toledo, where the team's Triple-AAA affiliate the Toledo Mud Hens played. Unfortunately, the Mud Hens were not well-stocked, either, compounding frustrations for a team already in complete disarray. Meanwhile, the pitching staff, which had remained remarkably intact through the first half, finally collapsed; Mike Maroth lost 21 games, the first MLB pitcher to lose 20 games in a season since Brian Kingman lost 20 for the 1980 Oakland Athletics, while Jeremy Bonderman lost 19 before Trammell mercifully pulled him from the rotation with two weeks remaining. Tigers' starters Maroth, Bonderman and Cornejo were the top three pitchers in losses for the 2003 season, the only time in Major League history that one team had the top three losers in a season. Franklyn Germán had the most saves on the team, with five in limited opportunities.

By September 22, the Tigers had lost ten straight and 118 on the season. Just as they appeared likely to go into the record books for futility, the Tigers roared back to life and won five of their last six games to finish 43–119. While it was one game short of the 120 losses by the 1962 Mets, it was still the most losses in American League history and one of the worst seasons for a non-expansion team in modern baseball history. The final series of the season was particularly memorable against the division champion Minnesota Twins, 48 games ahead of Detroit. The Twins sat their starters for almost all of the series in order to keep players rested for the playoffs. On September 27, in their next-to-last game, the Tigers came back from an 8–0 deficit to beat the Twins, 9–8 – on a strikeout wild pitch, an appropriate finish to a team that had struggled mightily all summer long. The Tigers then won the season finale, 9–4, to avoid tying the record and received a standing ovation from the crowd.

While the 2003 Tigers finished with what were at the time the third-most losses in major league history (behind the 1899 Cleveland Spiders and 1962 Mets), they fare slightly better based on winning percentage.

As of 2023, the 2003 Tigers rank only as the 12th worst team in history based on winning percentage (minimum 120 games), but unlike the 2003 Tigers, most of the other teams usually described as the worst of all time were plagued by significant off-field troubles:

- The owners of the 1899 Spiders also owned the St. Louis Browns, and transferred all their best players from Cleveland to St. Louis.
- The 1916 and 1919 A's had been plagued by financial problems, and their owner Connie Mack had sold off the team's best players, stocking the team with minor leaguers.
- The 1890 Alleghenys had almost all of their star players jump to the Players' League, leaving only a shell of a team.
- The 1886 Senators and Cowboys, 1889 Colonels, 1897–98 Browns, 1904 Senators and 1935 Braves were all plagued by financial and/or ownership issues, with the Colonels and Braves ownership failing to finish out the season.
- The 1962 Mets were a first-year expansion team.

For this reason, the 2003 Tigers had been described as being possibly "the worst team of all time without a good excuse."

Designated hitter/left fielder Dmitri Young was one member of the 2003 Tigers to have a good year, with a .297 batting average, 29 home runs, and .537 slugging percentage. According to Win Shares, the Tigers would have had about six fewer wins without him.

On the pitching staff, Jamie Walker stands out as the one pitcher who had a good season. Walker appeared in 78 games (2nd most in the AL) and had an ERA of 3.32 (Adjusted ERA+ of 130).

Some blamed first-year manager Alan Trammell for the team's performance. However, the 2002 team was 55–106 under manager Luis Pujols and in short, Trammell inherited a team in shambles. The Tigers did not sign any significant new talent in 2003 and lost several key players from the 2002 team, including the team's best starter, Jeff Weaver, closer Juan Acevedo, second baseman Damion Easley, right fielder Robert Fick, and designated hitter Randall Simon. Dean Palmer, who had 275 career home runs, tried to resuscitate an injury-plagued career, but ended up retiring. Even with fellow 1984 teammates Kirk Gibson and Lance Parrish on the coaching staff, Trammell could not turn the team around in 2003.

After the 2003 season, the Tigers acquired Iván Rodríguez, Carlos Guillén, Ugueth Urbina, and Rondell White. With the infusion of new talent, Trammell was able to lead the start of the franchise's turnaround, as the team improved to 72–90 in 2004, a 29-game improvement over the 2003 season which was the largest single-season improvement in the American League since Baltimore's 33-game improvement from 1988 to 1989.

Three years after losing 119 games, the Tigers went 95–67 and made it to the 2006 World Series. The 2006 pennant winners featured 10 players from the 2003 team: Brandon Inge, Ramón Santiago (who spent 2004 and 2005 with the Seattle Mariners), Craig Monroe, Omar Infante, Mike Maroth, Jeremy Bonderman, Nate Robertson, Jamie Walker, Wilfredo Ledezma, and Fernando Rodney. Dmitri Young was released in September 2006 following a number of off-field issues.

The loss record would not be threatened until 2018, when the Baltimore Orioles went 47–115. A year later, the Tigers themselves would also threaten the mark—winning just 47 games. However, due to a cancelled game that reduced their season to 161 games, they only had 114 losses, meaning that Baltimore had the worst team of the 2010s.

In 2024, both the American League and MLB records were broken by the Chicago White Sox. In ironic fashion, it was the Tigers who handed the White Sox their record breaking 121st loss—while capping a late-season 31–11 run and simultaneously clinching a spot in the postseason as a wild card team.

=== Season standings ===
AL Central
Team	W	L	Pct.	GB	Home	Road
Minnesota Twins	90	72	.556	—	48‍–‍33	42‍–‍39
Chicago White Sox	86	76	.531	4	51‍–‍30	35‍–‍46
Kansas City Royals	83	79	.512	7	40‍–‍40	43‍–‍39
Cleveland Indians	68	94	.420	22	38‍–‍43	30‍–‍51
Detroit Tigers	43	119	.265	47	23‍–‍58	20‍–‍61

=== Record vs. opponents ===
2003 American League record Source: MLB Standings Grid – 2003
Team	ANA	BAL	BOS	CWS	CLE	DET	KC	MIN	NYY	OAK	SEA	TB	TEX	TOR	NL
Anaheim	—	1–8	3–6	3–4	6–3	6–1	6–3	5–4	3–6	8–12	8–11	6–3	9–10	2–7	11–7
Baltimore	8–1	—	9–10	2–4	3–3	3–3	3–4	3–4	6–13–1	2–7	4–5	8–11	7–2	8–11	5–13
Boston	6–3	10–9	—	5–4	4–2	8–1	5–1	2–4	9–10	3–4	5–2	12–7	5–4	10–9	11–7
Chicago	4–3	4–2	4–5	—	11–8	11–8	11–8	9–10	4–2	4–5	2–7	3–3	3–4	6–3	10–8
Cleveland	3–6	3–3	2–4	8–11	—	12–7	6–13	9–10	2–5	3–6	3–6	5–2	4–5	2–4	6–12
Detroit	1–6	3–3	1–8	8–11	7–12	—	5–14	4–15	1–5	3–6	1–8	2–4	1–6	2–7	4–14
Kansas City	3–6	4–3	1–5	8–11	13–6	14–5	—	11–8	2–4	2–7	4–5	4–3	7–2	1–5	9–9
Minnesota	4–5	4–3	4–2	10–9	10–9	15–4	8–11	—	0–7	8–1	3–6	6–0	5–4	3–3	10–8
New York	6–3	13–6–1	10–9	2–4	5–2	5–1	4–2	7–0	—	3–6	5–4	14–5	4–5	10–9	13–5
Oakland	12–8	7–2	4–3	5–4	6–3	6–3	7–2	1–8	6–3	—	7–12	6–3	15–4	5–2	9–9
Seattle	11–8	5–4	2–5	7–2	6–3	8–1	5–4	6–3	4–5	12–7	—	4–5	10–10	3–4	10–8
Tampa Bay	3–6	11–8	7–12	3–3	2–5	4–2	3–4	0–6	5–14	3–6	5–4	—	3–6	11–8	3–15
Texas	10–9	2–7	4–5	4–3	5–4	6–1	2–7	4–5	5–4	4–15	10–10	6–3	—	5–4	4–14
Toronto	7–2	11–8	9–10	3–6	4–2	7–2	5–1	3–3	9–10	2–5	4–3	8–11	4–5	—	10–8

=== Roster ===
2003 Detroit Tigers
Roster
Pitchers: 14 Matt Anderson; 33 Steve Avery; 24 Adam Bernero; 38 Jeremy Bonderman; 34 Nate Cornejo; 36 Eric Eckenstahler; 49,62 Franklyn Germán; 55,35 Gary Knotts; 41 Wilfredo Ledezma; 58 Shane Loux; 46 Mike Maroth; 45 Chris Mears; 28 Danny Patterson; 59 Nate Robertson; 56 Fernando Rodney; 52 Matt Roney; 53 Brian Schmack; 37 Steve Sparks; 48 Chris Spurling; 32 Jamie Walker	Catchers: 26 A. J. Hinch; 15 Brandon Inge; 8 Matt Walbeck; Infielders: 17 Shane Halter; 20 Omar Infante; 49 Danny Klassen; 24 Warren Morris; 31 Eric Munson; 7 Dean Palmer; 21 Craig Paquette; 12 Carlos Peña; 39 Ramón Santiago; 21 Kevin Witt	Outfielders: 26 Hiram Bocachica; 4 Bobby Higginson; 43 Gene Kingsale; 27 Craig Monroe; 30 Ben Petrick; 26 Cody Ross; 19 Alex Sánchez; 44 Andrés Torres; 25 Dmitri Young; Other batters: 30 Ernie Young	Manager: 3 Alan Trammell; Coaches: 54 Bob Cluck (pitching); 29 Bruce Fields (hitting); 22 Kirk Gibson (bench); 18 Mick Kelleher (first base); 13 Lance Parrish (bullpen); 10 Juan Samuel (third base)

=== Transactions ===
- November 25, 2002: Randall Simon was traded by the Detroit Tigers to the Pittsburgh Pirates for a player to be named later and Adrian Burnside (minors). The Pittsburgh Pirates sent Roberto Novoa (December 16, 2002) to the Detroit Tigers to complete the trade.
- November 29, 2002: Ernie Young was signed as a free agent with the Detroit Tigers.
- January 20, 2003: Bill Haselman was signed as a free agent with the Detroit Tigers.
- January 23, 2003: Steve Avery was signed as a free agent with the Detroit Tigers.
- March 27, 2003: Bill Haselman was released by the Detroit Tigers.
- March 29, 2003: A. J. Hinch was purchased by the Detroit Tigers from the Cleveland Indians.

== Game log ==
2003 Game Log: 43–119 (Home: 23–58; Away: 20–61)
March: 0–1 (Home: 0–1; Away: 0–0)

#	Date	Opponent	Score	Win	Loss	Save	Attendance	Record	Streak
1	March 31	Twins	1–3	Radke (1–0)	Maroth (0–1)	Guardado (1)	40,427	0–1	L1

April: 3–20 (Home: 1–7; Away: 2–13)

#	Date	Opponent	Score	Win	Loss	Save	Attendance	Record	Streak
2	April 2	Twins	1–8	Mays (1–0)	Bonderman (0–1)	—	21,123	0–2	L2
3	April 3	Twins	0–3	Lohse (1–0)	Bernero (0–1)	Guardado (2)	8,862	0–3	L3
4	April 4	@ White Sox	2–5	Loaiza (1–0)	Cornejo (0–1)	Koch (1)	40,395	0–4	L4
5	April 5	@ White Sox	0–7	Buehrle (1–1)	Maroth (0–2)	—	16,972	0–5	L5
6	April 6	@ White Sox	2–10	Marte (1–0)	German (0–1)	—	14,514	0–6	L6
7	April 9	Royals	6–9	Affeldt (1–0)	Bonderman (0–2)	MacDougal (4)	14,286	0–7	L7
8	April 10	Royals	2–4	Asencio (1–0)	Maroth (0–3)	MacDougal (5)	9,080	0–8	L8
9	April 11	White Sox	0–5	Loaiza (2–0)	Bernero (0–2)	—	12,577	0–9	L9
10	April 12	White Sox	4–3	Cornejo (1–1)	Stewart (0–1)	Anderson (1)	12,985	1–9	W1
11	April 13	White Sox	2–3	Colón (1–0)	Knotts (0–1)	—	12,808	1–10	L1
12	April 15	@ Twins	4–6	Lohse (2–1)	Maroth (0–4)	Guardado (5)	14,036	1–11	L2
13	April 16	@ Twins	2–4	Reed (1–2)	Bernero (0–3)	Guardado (6)	13,503	1–12	L3
14	April 17	@ Twins	0–6	Rogers (2–0)	Bonderman (0–3)	—	13,015	1–13	L4
15	April 18	@ Royals	3–4	Carrasco (1–0)	Anderson (0–1)	—	38,937	1–14	L5
16	April 19	@ Royals	2–9	Lopez (3–0)	Knotts (0–2)	—	13,777	1–15	L6
17	April 20	@ Royals	3–4	MacDougal (1–0)	Maroth (0–5)	—	16,203	1–16	L7
18	April 22	@ Athletics	5–6	Rincón (1–1)	Ledezma (0–1)	—	11,559	1–17	L8
19	April 23	@ Athletics	4–1	Bonderman (1–3)	Zito (3–2)	Anderson (2)	23,558	2–17	W1
20	April 24	@ Athletics	0–2	Mulder (3–1)	Cornejo (1–2)	—	11,843	2–18	L1
21	April 25	@ Mariners	0–6	Pineiro (2–1)	Maroth (0–6)	—	33,458	2–19	L2
22	April 26	@ Mariners	6–4	Walker (1–0)	Franklin (1–2)	Anderson (3)	36,258	3–19	W1
23	April 27	@ Mariners	3–4	Garcia (2–3)	Bernero (0–4)	Nelson (2)	39,678	3–20	L1
24	April 29	Orioles	3–11	Johnson (4–0)	Bonderman (1–4)	—	10,829	3–21	L2

May: 11–18 (Home: 4–12; Away: 7–6)

#	Date	Opponent	Score	Win	Loss	Save	Attendance	Record	Streak
25	May 1 (1)	Orioles	2–5	Ryan (3–0)^{a}	Germán (0–2)	Julio (7)		3–22	L3
26	May 1 (2)	Orioles	4–6	Daal (2–3)	Maroth (0–7)	Julio (8)	16,177	3–23	L4
27	May 2	Devil Rays	0–2	Kennedy (2–2)	Knotts (0–3)	—	14,571	3–24	L5
28	May 3	Devil Rays	6–8	Levine (2–1)	Ledezma (0–2)	—	13,371	3–25	L6
29	May 4	Devil Rays	7–3	Bonderman (2–4)	Sosa (1–4)	Spurling (1)	12,956	4–25	W1
30	May 5	@ Orioles	6–1	Cornejo (2–2)	Johnson (4–1)	Sparks (1)	17,267	5–25	W2
31	May 6	@ Orioles	7–6	Germán (1–2)	Groom (1–1)	—	22,906	6–25	W3
32	May 7	@ Orioles	9–4	Knotts (1–3)	Daal (2–4)	—	22,770	7–25	W4
33	May 9	@ Devil Rays	0–2	Parque (1–1)	Bernero (0–5)	Carter (6)	8,894	7–26	L1
34	May 10	@ Devil Rays	1–3	McClung (3–1)	Bonderman (2–5)	Carter (7)	12,325	7–27	L2
35	May 11	@ Devil Rays	9–2	Cornejo (3–2)	Sosa (1–5)	—	9,259	8–27	W1
36	May 13	Athletics	1–3	Lilly (3–2)	Maroth (0–8)	Foulke (11)	12,563	8–28	L1
37	May 14	Athletics	2–1	Avery (1–0)	Rincón (2–2)	—	11,091	9–28	W1
38	May 15	Athletics	2–11	Zito (6–3)	Bernero (0–6)	—	10,513	9–29	L1
39	May 16	Mariners	3–6	Meche (5–2)	Bonderman (2–6)	Sasaki (5)	17,641	9–30	L2
40	May 17	Mariners	3–6	Moyer (6–2)	Cornejo (3–3)	Sasaki (6)	23,274	9–31	L3
41	May 18	Mariners	2–6	Pineiro (4–3)	Maroth (0–9)	—	16,263	9–32	L4
42	May 19	@ Indians	9–10	Traber (2–2)	Walker (1–1)	Riske (1)	16,492	9–33	L5
43	May 20	@ Indians	4–6	Riske (1–0)	Roney (0–1)	—	15,499	9–34	L6
44	May 21	@ Indians	0–4	Sabathia (3–2)	Bonderman (2–7)	—	16,534	9–35	L7
45	May 22	@ Indians	3–2	Germán (2–2)	Phillips (0–1)	Sparks (2)	18,347	10–35	W1
46	May 23	@ White Sox	3–2	Maroth (1–9)	Gordon (2–4)	Spurling (2)	15,069	11–35	W2
47	May 24	@ White Sox	1–0	Knotts (2–3)	Loaiza (7–2)	Germán (1)	27,535	12–35	W3
48	May 25	@ White Sox	5–8	Glover (1–0)	Sparks (0–1)	—	21,398	12–36	L1
49	May 26	Indians	6–5	Avery (2–0)	Boyd (0–1)	Germán (2)	17,619	13–36	W1
50	May 27	Indians	2–5	Miceli (1–2)	Walker (1–2)	Báez (10)	10,844	13–37	L1
51	May 28	Indians	2–8	Rodríguez (3–5)	Maroth (1–10)	—	17,388	13–38	L2
52	May 30	Yankees	0–6	Contreras (2–1)	Knotts (2–4)	—	28,003	13–39	L3
53	May 31	Yankees	4–2	Bernero (1–6)	Weaver (3–4)	Germán (3)	24,959	14–39	W1

June: 5–22 (Home: 2–12; Away: 3–10)

#	Date	Opponent	Score	Win	Loss	Save	Attendance	Record	Streak
54	June 1	Yankees	9–10	Wells (7–2)	Sparks (0–2)	Acevedo (6)	44,095	14–40	L1
55	June 3	@ Padres	3–2	Walker (2–2)	Lawrence (3–7)	Germán (4)	15,521	15–40	W1
56	June 4	@ Padres	5–3	Ledezma (1–2)	Hackman (1–1)	Germán (5)	13,227	16–40	W2
57	June 5	@ Padres	1–5	Eaton (2–4)	Bernero (1–7)	—	14,710	16–41	L1
58	June 6	@ Giants	3–5	Rueter (7–1)	Bonderman (2–8)	Worrell (15)	41,554	16–42	L2
59	June 7	@ Giants	5–7	Schmidt (5–2)	Maroth (1–11)	—	40,060	16–43	L3
60	June 8	@ Giants	6–7	Nathan (6–2)	German (2–3)	Worrell (16)	41,177	16–44	L4
61	June 10	Dodgers	1–3	Shuey (3–1)	Sparks (0–3)	Gagné (22)	13,419	16–45	L5
62	June 11	Dodgers	1–3	Brown (9–1)	Bernero (1–8)	Gagné (23)	13,716	16–46	L6
63	June 12	Dodgers	2–3	Ishii (6–2)	Bonderman (2–9)	Gagné (24)	13,644	16–47	L7
64	June 13	Rockies	2–7	Chacón (9–3)	Cornejo (3–4)	—	19,212	16–48	L8
65	June 14	Rockies	9–7	Ledezma (2–2)	Elarton (3–2)	Spurling (3)	19,260	17–48	W1
66	June 15	Rockies	4–5	Jennings (6–5)	Knotts (2–5)	Jimenez (16)	19,323	17–49	L1
67	June 17	Indians	4–7	Sabathia (6–3)	Bernero (1–9)	Báez (15)	13,908	17–50	L2
68	June 18	Indians	1–4	Davis (6–5)	Bonderman (2–10)	—	16,278	17–51	L3
69	June 19	Indians	3–10	Anderson (4–6)	Cornejo (3–5)	—	19,098	17–52	L4
70	June 20	@ Rockies	7–5	Maroth (2–11)	Elarton (3–3)	—	29,603	18–52	W1
71	June 21	@ Rockies	6–9	Jennings (7–5)	Sparks (0–4)	—	35,660	18–53	L1
72	June 22	@ Rockies	3–5	Neagle (1–1)	Bernero (1–10)	Jimenez (17)	34,723	18–54	L2
73	June 23	@ Red Sox	1–3	Wakefield (6–3)	Bonderman (2–11)	Timlin (2)	33,814	18–55	L3
74	June 24	@ Red Sox	1–10	Lowe (8–3)	Cornejo (3–6)	—	33,848	18–56	L4
75	June 25	@ Red Sox	2–11	Burkett (6–3)	Maroth (2–12)	—	33,587	18–57	L5
76	June 26	@ Red Sox	4–6	Martínez (5–2)	Roney (0–2)	Lyon (9)	34,415	18–58	L6
77	June 27	D-backs	3–8	Randolph (2–0)	Bernero (1–11)	—	27,682	18–59	L7
78	June 28	D-backs	0–7	Webb (4–2)	Bonderman (2–12)	—	20,804	18–60	L8
79	June 29	D-backs	3–5	Oropesa (2–1)	Spurling (0–1)	Valverde (9)	18,989	18–61	L9
80	June 30	Blue Jays	6–2	Maroth (3–12)	Lidle (10–6)	—	13,353	19–61	W1

July: 9–17 (Home: 6–5; Away: 3–12)

#	Date	Opponent	Score	Win	Loss	Save	Attendance	Record	Streak
81	July 1	Blue Jays	5–0	Roney (1–2)	Hendrickson (5–6)	Walker (1)	15,448	20–61	W2
82	July 2	Blue Jays	2–8	Halladay (12–2)	Bernero (1–12)	—	16,052	20–62	L1
83	July 3	@ Royals	2–3	Affeldt (5–4)	Bonderman (2–13)	MacDougal (22)	12,978	20–63	L2
84	July 4	@ Royals	8–9	Field (1–0)	Cornejo (3–7)	MacDougal (23)	39,920	20–64	L3
85	July 5	@ Royals	9–5	Maroth (4–12)	Voyles (0–2)	Walker (2)	19,030	21–64	W1
86	July 6	@ Royals	3–5	Lima (4–0)	Roney (1–3)	MacDougal (24)	12,844	21–65	L1
87	July 8	White Sox	2–1	Spurling (1–1)	Garland (6–7)	Mears (1)	13,643	22–65	W1
88	July 9	White Sox	4–2	Bonderman (3–13)	Colón (6–8)	Mears (2)	12,869	23–65	W2
89	July 10	White Sox	1–0	Cornejo (4–7)	Loaiza (11–5)	Mears (3)	18,206	24–65	W3
90	July 11	Red Sox	3–5	Burkett (7–4)	Maroth (4–13)	Kim (4)	26,538	24–66	L1
91	July 12	Red Sox	2–4	Jones (3–4)	Rodney (0–1)	Kim (5)	23,206	24–67	L2
92	July 13	Red Sox	3–0	Ledezma (3–2)	Wakefield (6–4)	Mears (4)	23,829	25–67	W1
93	July 17	@ White Sox	10–9	Maroth (5–13)	Colón (6–9)	—	17,060	26–67	W2
94	July 18	@ White Sox	5–7	Buehrle (8–10)	Roney (1–4)	Gordon (4)	18,868	26–68	L1
95	July 19	@ White Sox	2–6	Garland (7–7)	Cornejo (4–8)	Marte (5)	32,245	26–69	L2
96	July 20	@ White Sox	1–10	Loaiza (12–5)	Ledezma (3–3)	—	20,631	26–70	L3
97	July 21	@ Red Sox	5–14	Burkett (8–4)	Bonderman (3–14)	Fossum (1)	33,823	26–71	L4
98	July 22	@ Red Sox	4–7	Lowe (11–4)	Maroth (5–14)	—	33,570	26–72	L5
99	July 23	@ Indians	1–4	Anderson (8–7)	Roney (1–5)	Báez (22)	21,202	26–73	L6
100	July 24	@ Indians	7–4	Cornejo (5–8)	Sabathia (8–6)	Mears (5)	20,857	27–73	W1
101	July 25	Royals	3–8	Hernández (5–3)	Ledezma (3–4)	—	29,697	27–74	L1
102	July 26	Royals	5–1	Bonderman (4–14)	Snyder (1–5)	—	24,664	28–74	W1
103	July 27	Royals	1–5	Lima (7–0)	Maroth (5–15)	—	35,326	28–75	L1
104	July 29	@ Mariners	5–11	Meche (11–7)	Roney (1–6)	—	30,732	28–76	L2
105	July 30	@ Mariners	3–13	Moyer (14–5)	Cornejo (5–9)	—	35,800	28–77	L3
106	July 31	@ Mariners	0–4	Pineiro (13–5)	Ledezma (3–5)	—	43,596	28–78	L4

August: 6–23 (Home: 3–13; Away: 3–10)

#	Date	Opponent	Score	Win	Loss	Save	Attendance	Record	Streak
107	August 1	@ Twins	4–10	Lohse (7–9)	Bonderman (4–15)	Baldwin (1)	20,101	28–79	L5
108	August 2	@ Twins	9–2	Maroth (6–15)	Reed (5–10)	—	29,278	29–79	W1
109	August 3	@ Twins	2–7	Santana (5–3)	Roney (1–7)	—	27,613	29–80	L1
110	August 5	Athletics	2–7	Harden (3–0)	Cornejo (5–10)	—	13,263	29–81	L2
111	August 6	Athletics	3–9	Hudson (10–4)	Ledezma (3–6)	—	16,545	29–82	L3
112	August 7	Athletics	3–2	Bonderman (5–15)	Zito (8–10)	Patterson (1)	19,664	30–82	W1
113	August 8	Twins	3–4	Santana (6–3)	Maroth (6–16)	Guardado (26)	23,740	30–83	L1
114	August 9	Twins	4–8	Rincón (3–4)	Mears (0–1)	—	19,199	30–84	L2
115	August 10	Twins	3–4	Rogers (9–6)	Cornejo (5–11)	Guardado (27)	19,975	30–85	L3
116	August 11	@ Rangers	3–9	Benoit (7–5)	Sparks (0–5)	—	27,674	30–86	L4
117	August 12	@ Rangers	7–4	Bonderman (6–15)	Dominguez (0–1)	Patterson (2)	17,524	31–86	W1
118	August 13	@ Rangers	3–7	Dickey (7–5)	Maroth (6–17)	Cordero (9)	17,491	31–87	L1
119	August 14	@ Rangers	3–6	Thomson (10–10)	Roney (1–8)	Cordero (10)	17,019	31–88	L2
120	August 15	@ Angels	1–3	Lackey (8–11)	Cornejo (5–12)	Percival (26)	43,174	31–89	L3
121	August 16	@ Angels	7–11	Glover (2–0)	Ledezma (3–7)	—	42,337	31–90	L4
122	August 17	@ Angels	6–11	Ortiz (14–10)	Bonderman (6–16)	—	40,745	31–91	L5
123	August 18	Rangers	2–4	Mahay (2–0)	Sparks (0–6)	Dickey (1)	11,698	31–92	L6
124	August 19	Rangers	4–5	Thomson (11–10)	Maroth (6–18)	Shouse (1)	13,501	31–93	L7
125	August 20	Rangers	0–6	Dickey (8–5)	Cornejo (5–13)	—	13,788	31–94	L8
126	August 21	Angels	7–10	Sele (7–9)	Roney (1–9)	—	12,236	31–95	L9
127	August 22	Angels	5–6	Ortiz (15–10)	Bonderman (6–17)	Percival (27)	21,955	31–96	L10
128	August 23	Angels	8–14	Donnelly (2–2)	Spurling (1–2)	—	26,463	31–97	L11
129	August 24	Angels	10–9	Walker (3–2)	Percival (0–4)	—	17,382	32–97	W1
130	August 26	@ Indians	5–4	Cornejo (6–13)	Traber (6–7)	Walker (3)	16,972	33–97	W2
131	August 27	@ Indians	7–9	Cressend (2–0)	Spurling (1–3)	Riske (4)	16,457	33–98	L1
132	August 28	@ Indians	3–8	Lee (3–1)	Bonderman (6–18)	—	16,282	33–99	L2
133	August 29	White Sox	8–4	Robertson (1–0)	Buehrle (11–13)	—	15,828	34–99	W1
134	August 30	White Sox	2–5	Garland (10–10)	Maroth (6–19)	—	15,786	34–100	L1
135	August 31	White Sox	1–6	Loaiza (18–6)	Cornejo (6–14)	—	15,873	34–101	L2

September: 9–18 (Home: 7–8; Away: 2–10)

#	Date	Opponent	Score	Win	Loss	Save	Attendance	Record	Streak
136	September 1	Indians	4–7	Santiago (1–1)	Walker (3–3)	Riske (5)	10,986	34–102	L3
137	September 2	Indians	8–6	Schmack (1–0)	Durbin (0–1)	Rodney (1)	9,318	35–102	W1
138	September 3	Indians	6–5	Walker (4–3)	Santiago (1–2)	—	10,234	36–102	W2
139	September 4	Indians	2–1	Knotts (3–5)	Westbrook (6–9)	Patterson (3)	11,371	37–102	W3
140	September 5	@ Blue Jays	6–8	Sturtze (7–6)	Maroth (6–20)	López (9)	14,455	37–103	L1
141	September 6	@ Blue Jays	0–1	Halladay (19–6)	Rodney (0–2)	—	18,261	37–104	L2
142	September 7	@ Blue Jays	0–8	Towers (5–1)	Mears (0–2)	—	16,617	37–105	L3
143	September 9	@ Yankees	2–4	White (4–0)	Rodney (0–3)	Rivera (34)	31,826	37–106	L4
144	September 10	@ Yankees	5–15	Pettitte (18–8)	Knotts (3–6)	—	34,000	37–107	L5
145	September 11	@ Yankees	2–5	Clemens (14–9)	Cornejo (6–15)	Rivera (35)	31,915	37–108	L6
146	September 12	Royals	3–0	Maroth (7–20)	Abbott (1–1)	Rodney (2)	18,042	38–108	W1
147	September 13	Royals	0–7	Wright (1–1)	Mears (0–3)	—	15,966	38–109	L1
148	September 14	Royals	2–7	Gobble (4–4)	Robertson (0–2)	—	13,579	38–110	L2
149	September 15	Royals	4–10	Anderson (12–11)	Knotts (3–7)	—	9,342	38–111	L3
150	September 16	Blue Jays	6–9	Kershner (2–3)	Cornejo (6–16)	—	9,801	38–112	L4
151	September 17	Blue Jays	0–6	Halladay (21–6)	Loux (0–1)	—	11,240	38–113	L5
152	September 18	Blue Jays	6–10	Towers (7–1)	Maroth (7–21)	—	9,951	38–114	L6
153	September 19	@ Twins	2–6	Milton (1–0)	Bonderman (6–19)	—	30,013	38–115	L7
154	September 20	@ Twins	3–7	Santana (12–3)	Robertson (1–2)	—	26,903	38–116	L8
155	September 21	@ Twins	4–6	Radke (14–10)	Cornejo (6–17)	Guardado (39)	33,396	38–117	L9
156	September 22	@ Royals	6–12	Affeldt (7–6)	Knotts (3–8)	—	10,574	38–118	L10
157	September 23	@ Royals	15–6	Maroth (8–21)	Lima (8–2)	—	11,180	39–118	W1
158	September 24	@ Royals	4–3	Loux (1–1)	Gobble (4–5)	Rodney (3)	10,758	40–118	W2
159	September 25	Twins	5–4	Mears (1–3)	Thomas (0–1)	—	9,296	41–118	W3
160	September 26	Twins	4–5	Guardado (3–5)	Germán (2–4)	Hawkins (2)	16,518	41–119	L1
161	September 27	Twins	9–8	Rodney (1–3)	Orosco (2–2)	—	14,277	42–119	W1
162	September 28	Twins	9–4	Maroth (9–21)	Johnson (0–1)	—	18,959	43–119	W2

=== Detailed records ===
American League
Opponent	Home	Away	Total	Pct.	Runs scored	Runs allowed
AL East
Baltimore Orioles	0–3	3–0	3–3	.500	31	33
Boston Red Sox	1–2	0–6	1–8	.111	25	60
New York Yankees	1–2	0–3	1–5	.167	22	42
Tampa Bay Devil Rays	1–2	1–2	2–4	.333	23	20
Toronto Blue Jays	2–4	0–3	2–7	.222	31	52
	5–13	4–14	9–27	.250	132	207
AL Central
Chicago White Sox	5–4	3–7	8–11	.421	55	93
Cleveland Indians	4–6	3–6	7–12	.368	77	109
Detroit Tigers	—	—	—	—	—	—
Kansas City Royals	3–7	2–7	5–14	.263	81	111
Minnesota Twins	3–7	1–8	4–15	.211	69	105
	15–24	9–28	24–52	.316	282	428
AL West
Anaheim Angels	1–3	0–3	1–6	.143	44	64
Oakland Athletics	2–4	1–2	3–6	.333	22	42
Seattle Mariners	0–3	1–5	1–8	.111	25	60
Texas Rangers	0–3	1–3	1–6	.143	22	41
	3–13	3–13	6–26	.188	113	207

National League
Opponent	Home	Away	Total	Pct.	Runs scored	Runs allowed
Arizona Diamondbacks	0–3	0–0	0–3	.000	6	20
Colorado Rockies	1–2	1–2	2–4	.333	31	38
Los Angeles Dodgers	0–3	0–0	0–3	.000	4	9
San Diego Padres	0–0	2–1	2–1	.667	9	10
San Francisco Giants	0–0	0–3	0–3	.000	14	19
	1–8	3–6	4–14	.222	64	96

== Player stats ==
=== Batting ===
Note: G = Games played; AB = At bats; H = Hits; Avg. = Batting average; HR = Home runs; RBI = Runs batted in

Player	G	AB	H	Avg.	HR	RBI
Dmitri Young	155	562	167	.297	29	85
Bobby Higginson	130	469	110	.235	14	52
Carlos Peña	131	452	112	.248	18	50
Ramón Santiago	141	444	100	.225	2	29
Craig Monroe	128	425	102	.240	23	70
Alex Sánchez	101	394	114	.289	1	22
Shane Halter	114	360	78	.217	12	30
Warren Morris	97	346	94	.272	6	37
Brandon Inge	104	330	67	.203	8	30
Eric Munson	99	313	75	.240	18	50
Kevin Witt	93	270	71	.263	10	26
Omar Infante	69	221	49	.222	0	8
Andrés Torres	59	168	37	.220	1	9
Matt Walbeck	59	138	24	.174	1	6
Gene Kingsale	39	120	25	.208	1	8
Ben Petrick	43	120	27	.225	4	12
Dean Palmer	26	86	12	.140	0	6
A. J. Hinch	27	74	15	.203	3	11
Danny Klassen	22	73	18	.247	1	7
Craig Paquette	11	33	5	.152	0	0
Hiram Bocachica	6	22	1	.045	0	0
Cody Ross	6	19	4	.211	1	5
Ernie Young	5	11	2	.182	0	0
Pitcher totals	162	16	3	.188	0	0
Team totals	162	5466	1312	.240	153	553

Note: Individual pitchers' batting statistics not included

=== Starting and other pitchers ===
Note: G = Games pitched; IP = Innings pitched; W = Wins; L = Losses; ERA = Earned run average; SO = Strikeouts

Player	G	IP	W	L	ERA	SO
Nate Cornejo	32	194.2	6	17	4.67	46
Mike Maroth	33	193.1	9	21	5.73	87
Jeremy Bonderman	33	162.0	6	19	5.56	108
Adam Bernero	18	100.2	1	12	6.08	54
Matt Roney	45	100.2	1	9	5.45	47
Gary Knotts	20	95.1	3	8	6.04	51
Wil Ledezma	34	84.0	3	7	5.79	49
Nate Robertson	8	44.2	1	2	5.44	33
Shane Loux	11	30.1	1	1	7.12	8

=== Relief pitchers ===
Note: G = Games pitched; IP = Innings pitched; W= Wins; L= Losses; SV = Saves; GF= Games finished; ERA = Earned run average; SO = Strikeouts

Player	G	IP	W	L	SV	GF	ERA	SO
Jamie Walker	78	65.0	4	3	3	19	3.32	45
Chris Spurling	66	77.0	1	3	3	18	4.68	38
Franklyn Germán	45	44.2	2	4	5	15	6.04	41
Steve Sparks	42	89.2	0	6	2	24	4.72	49
Chris Mears	29	41.1	1	3	5	16	5.44	21
Fernando Rodney	27	29.2	1	3	3	11	6.07	33
Matt Anderson	23	23.1	0	1	3	10	5.40	13
Eric Eckenstahler	20	15.2	0	0	0	5	2.87	12
Danny Patterson	19	17.2	0	0	3	9	4.08	19
Steve Avery	19	16.0	2	0	0	5	5.63	6
Brian Schmack	11	13.0	1	0	0	1	3.46	4
Team Pitching Totals	162	1438.2	43	119	27	159	5.30	764

== League leaders and awards ==
- Jeremy Bonderman: #2 in MLB in losses (19)
- Jeremy Bonderman: #2 in AL in wild pitches (12)
- Jeremy Bonderman: second youngest player in AL (20)
- Nate Cornejo: #5 in AL in hits allowed (236)
- Nate Cornejo: #3 in MLB in losses (17)
- Brandon Inge: AL leader in baserunners caught stealing (40)
- Brandon Inge: AL leader in double plays by a catcher (11)
- Mike Maroth: AL leader in home runs allowed (34)
- Mike Maroth: MLB leader in losses (21)
- Mike Maroth: MLB leader in earned runs allowed (123)
- Mike Maroth: AL leader in baserunners caught stealing (11)
- Mike Maroth: AL leader in baserunners picked off (7)
- Carlos Peña: AL leader in errors by a first baseman (13)
- Alex Sánchez: #2 in AL in stolen bases (44)
- Alex Sánchez: MLB leader in times caught stealing (18)
- Ramón Santiago: MLB leader in sacrifice hits (18)
- Jamie Walker: #2 in AL in games by a pitcher (78)
- Dmitri Young: Tiger of the Year Award
- Dmitri Young: #5 in AL in strikeouts (130)
- Dmitri Young: #4 in AL in intentional walks (16)

== Farm system ==
Level	Team	League	Manager
AAA	Toledo Mud Hens	International League	Larry Parrish
AA	Erie SeaWolves	Eastern League	Kevin Bradshaw
A	Lakeland Tigers	Florida State League	Gary Green
A	West Michigan Whitecaps	Midwest League	Phil Regan
A-Short Season	Oneonta Tigers	New York–Penn League	Randy Ready
Rookie	GCL Tigers	Gulf Coast League	Howard Bushong

== In popular culture ==
In the episode “The Path” from the series The Last of Us, in the second season, which aired on April 27, 2025, on HBO, the character Gail, played by Catherine O'Hara, after a dialogue with Tommy, played by Gabriel Luna, in which she claimed to be a Tigers fan, made a joke comparing the game played by children to the team's 2003 season, saying, “This game looks a lot like the Tigers' 2003 season.”

== See also ==
- List of worst Major League Baseball season records

== Notes ==
a. Ryan was credited with the win without throwing a pitch. With two outs in the bottom of the 7th, he picked off Omar Infante at first to end the inning. The Orioles then took the lead in the top of the eighth, meaning Ryan would be in line for a win. Ryan was replaced with Buddy Groom before the bottom of the eighth. Baltimore kept the lead and Ryan was recorded with the win.
