= 2002 Detroit Tigers season =

Major League Baseball season

2002 Detroit Tigers
- League: American League
- Division: Central
- Ballpark: Comerica Park
- City: Detroit, Michigan
- Record: 55–106 (.342)
- Divisional place: 5th
- Owners: Mike Ilitch
- General managers: Randy Smith, Dave Dombrowski
- Managers: Phil Garner, Luis Pujols
- Television: WKBD (Frank Beckmann, Lance Parrish); FSN Detroit (Jack Morris, Mario Impemba)
- Radio: WXYT (AM) (Ernie Harwell, Jim Price, Dan Dickerson)

The 2002 Detroit Tigers season was the team's 102nd season and its third at Comerica Park. Their win total regressed for the second consecutive year, finishing 11 games worse than their 66-win total in 2001. They finished last in the American League Central, 39 games out of first place, and missed the playoffs for the 15th consecutive season. The .342 win percentage was the third-worst in Tigers history at the time, better than only 1952 (.325) and 1996 (.327); it has since been further surpassed by 2003 (.265) and 2019 (.292).

== Offseason ==
- December 19, 2001: Adam Riggs was signed as a free agent with the Detroit Tigers.

== Regular season ==
On July 2, the Tigers and White Sox set a Major League Baseball record by combining to hit for 12 home runs in one game. The box score for the home runs is as follows:

- Detroit Young 2 (7,1st inning off Ritchie 0 on, 2 out, 9th inning off Howry 0 on, 2 out); Fick (11,1st inning off Ritchie 1 on, 2 out); Lombard (1,7th inning off Ritchie 0 on, 1 out); Magee (6,9th inning off Howry 0 on, 0 out); Easley (4,9th inning off Howry 1 on).
- Chicago Lofton (4,1st inning off Bernero 0 on, 0 out); Ordonez 2 (15,1st inning off Bernero 0 on, 2 out, 8th inning off Paniagua 3 on, 1 out); Valentin (11,2nd inning off Bernero 0 on, 0 out); Alomar 2 (6,4th inning off Bernero 0 on, 2 out, 6th inning off Lima 0 on).

=== Notable transactions ===
- June 4, 2002: Curtis Granderson was drafted by the Tigers in the 3rd round of the 2002 Major League Baseball draft. Player signed June 28, 2002.
- July 5, 2002: Jeff Weaver was traded by the Tigers to the New York Yankees, and cash was sent by the Tigers to the Oakland Athletics, as part of a 3-team trade. The Athletics sent Carlos Peña, Franklyn Germán, and a player to be named later to the Tigers. The Yankees sent Ted Lilly, John-Ford Griffin, and Jason Arnold (minors) to the Athletics. The Athletics completed the trade by sending Jeremy Bonderman to the Tigers on August 22.
- August 16, 2002: Jason Beverlin was selected off waivers by the Tigers from the Cleveland Indians.

=== Season standings ===
AL Central
| Team | W | L | Pct. | GB | Home | Road |
|---|---|---|---|---|---|---|
| Minnesota Twins | 94 | 67 | .584 | — | 54‍–‍27 | 40‍–‍40 |
| Chicago White Sox | 81 | 81 | .500 | 13½ | 47‍–‍34 | 34‍–‍47 |
| Cleveland Indians | 74 | 88 | .457 | 20½ | 39‍–‍42 | 35‍–‍46 |
| Kansas City Royals | 62 | 100 | .383 | 32½ | 37‍–‍44 | 25‍–‍56 |
| Detroit Tigers | 55 | 106 | .342 | 39 | 33‍–‍47 | 22‍–‍59 |

=== American League Wild Card ===
Division leaders
| Team | W | L | Pct. |
|---|---|---|---|
| New York Yankees | 103 | 58 | .640 |
| Minnesota Twins | 94 | 67 | .584 |
| Oakland Athletics | 103 | 59 | .636 |

Wild Card team (Top team qualifies for postseason)
| Team | W | L | Pct. | GB |
|---|---|---|---|---|
| Anaheim Angels | 99 | 63 | .611 | — |
| Boston Red Sox | 93 | 69 | .574 | 6 |
| Seattle Mariners | 93 | 69 | .574 | 6 |
| Chicago White Sox | 81 | 81 | .500 | 18 |
| Toronto Blue Jays | 78 | 84 | .481 | 21 |
| Cleveland Indians | 74 | 88 | .457 | 25 |
| Texas Rangers | 72 | 90 | .444 | 27 |
| Baltimore Orioles | 67 | 95 | .414 | 32 |
| Kansas City Royals | 62 | 100 | .383 | 37 |
| Detroit Tigers | 55 | 106 | .342 | 43½ |
| Tampa Bay Devil Rays | 55 | 106 | .342 | 43½ |

=== Record vs. opponents ===
2002 American League record Source: MLB Standings Grid – 2002
| Team | ANA | BAL | BOS | CWS | CLE | DET | KC | MIN | NYY | OAK | SEA | TB | TEX | TOR | NL |
|---|---|---|---|---|---|---|---|---|---|---|---|---|---|---|---|
| Anaheim | — | 7–2 | 3–4 | 6–3 | 6–3 | 8–1 | 6–3 | 4–5 | 3–4 | 9–11 | 9–10 | 8–1 | 12–7 | 7–2 | 11–7 |
| Baltimore | 2–7 | — | 6–13 | 3–4 | 1–5 | 2–4 | 7–0 | 5–1 | 6–13 | 4–5 | 5–4 | 10–9 | 3–6 | 4–15 | 9–9 |
| Boston | 4–3 | 13–6 | — | 2–4 | 5–4 | 5–4 | 4–2 | 3–3 | 9–10 | 6–3 | 4–5 | 16–3 | 4–3 | 13–6 | 5–13 |
| Chicago | 3–6 | 4–3 | 4–2 | — | 9–10 | 12–7 | 11–8 | 8–11 | 2–4 | 2–7 | 5–4 | 4–3 | 5–4 | 4–2 | 8–10 |
| Cleveland | 3–6 | 5–1 | 4–5 | 10–9 | — | 10–9 | 9–10 | 8–11 | 3–6 | 2–5 | 3–4 | 4–2 | 4–5 | 3–3 | 6–12 |
| Detroit | 1–8 | 4–2 | 4–5 | 7–12 | 9–10 | — | 9–10 | 4–14 | 1–8 | 1–6 | 2–5 | 2–4 | 5–4 | 0–6 | 6–12 |
| Kansas City | 3–6 | 0–7 | 2–4 | 8–11 | 10–9 | 10–9 | — | 5–14 | 1–5 | 1–8 | 3–6 | 4–2 | 7–2 | 3–4 | 5–13 |
| Minnesota | 5–4 | 1–5 | 3–3 | 11–8 | 11–8 | 14–4 | 14–5 | — | 0–6 | 3–6 | 5–4 | 5–2 | 6–3 | 6–1 | 10–8 |
| New York | 4–3 | 13–6 | 10–9 | 4–2 | 6–3 | 8–1 | 5–1 | 6–0 | — | 5–4 | 4–5 | 13–5 | 4–3 | 10–9 | 11–7 |
| Oakland | 11–9 | 5–4 | 3–6 | 7–2 | 5–2 | 6–1 | 8–1 | 6–3 | 4–5 | — | 8–11 | 8–1 | 13–6 | 3–6 | 16–2 |
| Seattle | 10–9 | 4–5 | 5–4 | 4–5 | 4–3 | 5–2 | 6–3 | 4–5 | 5–4 | 11–8 | — | 5–4 | 13–7 | 6–3 | 11–7 |
| Tampa Bay | 1–8 | 9–10 | 3–16 | 3–4 | 2–4 | 4–2 | 2–4 | 2–5 | 5–13 | 1–8 | 4–5 | — | 4–5 | 8–11 | 7–11 |
| Texas | 7–12 | 6–3 | 3–4 | 4–5 | 5–4 | 4–5 | 2–7 | 3–6 | 3–4 | 6–13 | 7–13 | 5–4 | — | 8–1 | 9–9 |
| Toronto | 2–7 | 15–4 | 6–13 | 2–4 | 3–3 | 6–0 | 4–3 | 1–6 | 9–10 | 6–3 | 3–6 | 11–8 | 1–8 | — | 9–9 |

=== Roster ===
2002 Detroit Tigers
Roster
| Pitchers: 57 Juan Acevedo; 14 Matt Anderson; 24 Adam Bernero; 31 Jason Beverlin; 34 Nate Cornejo; 61 Eric Eckenstahler; 52 Jeff Farnsworth; 62 Franklyn Germán; 50 Seth Greisinger; 41 Oscar Henríquez; 63 Jason Jimenez; 30 Kris Keller; 42 José Lima; 58 Shane Loux; 46 Mike Maroth; 58 Matt Miller; 38 Brian Moehler; 22 José Paniagua; 28 Danny Patterson; 45 Terry Pearson; 40 Matt Perisho; 40 Brian Powell; 55 Mark Redman; 56 Fernando Rodney; 58 Erik Sabel; 48 Julio Santana; 37 Steve Sparks; 50 Andy Van Hekken; 32 Jamie Walker; 36 Jeff Weaver | Catchers: 12 Brandon Inge; 21 Mitch Meluskey; 33 Eric Munson; 49 Mike Rivera; 45 Matt Walbeck; Infielders: 22 Hiram Bocachica; 9 Damion Easley; 17 Shane Halter; 20 Omar Infante; 12 Damian Jackson; 39 José Macías; 7 Dean Palmer; 8 Craig Paquette; 43 Carlos Peña; 40 Oscar Salazar; 39 Ramón Santiago; 35 Randall Simon; 27 Chris Truby; 26 Dmitri Young | Outfielders: 44 Jacob Cruz; 25 Robert Fick; 4 Bobby Higginson; 20 Ryan Jackson; 30 George Lombard; 29 Wendell Magee; 21 Craig Monroe; 44 Andrés Torres | Manager: 33 Phil Garner; 53 Luis Pujols; Coaches: ? Felipe Alou (Bench); ? Jeff Jones (Bullpen); ? Rafael Landestoy (1st Base); 32 Doug Mansolino (3rd Base); ? Steve McCatty (Pitching); 56 Ed Ott (Bullpen); 53 Luis Pujols (Bench); 19 Merv Rettenmund (Hitting); 10 Juan Samuel (1st Base), (3rd Base); 31 Dan Warthen (Pitching); 23 Kirk Gibson (Roving) |

Worst Seasons in Detroit Tigers History
| Rank | Year | Wins | Losses | Win % |
| 1 | 2003 | 43 | 119 | .265 |
| 2 | 1952 | 50 | 104 | .325 |
| 3 | 1996 | 53 | 109 | .327 |
| 4 | 2002 | 55 | 106 | .342 |
| 5 | 1975 | 57 | 102 | .358 |

== Player stats ==
=== Batting ===
==== Starters by position ====
Note: Pos = Position; G = Games played; AB = At bats; H = Hits; Avg. = Batting average; HR = Home runs; RBI = Runs batted in

| Pos | Player | G | AB | H | Avg. | HR | RBI |
|---|---|---|---|---|---|---|---|
| C | Brandon Inge | 95 | 321 | 65 | .202 | 7 | 24 |
| 1B | Carlos Peña | 75 | 273 | 69 | .253 | 12 | 36 |
| 2B | Damion Easley | 85 | 304 | 68 | .224 | 8 | 30 |
| 3B | Chris Truby | 89 | 277 | 55 | .199 | 2 | 15 |
| SS | Shane Halter | 122 | 410 | 98 | .239 | 10 | 39 |
| LF | Bobby Higginson | 119 | 444 | 125 | .282 | 10 | 63 |
| CF | Wendell Magee | 97 | 347 | 94 | .271 | 6 | 35 |
| RF | Robert Fick | 148 | 556 | 150 | .270 | 17 | 63 |
| DH | Randall Simon | 130 | 482 | 145 | .301 | 19 | 82 |

==== Other batters ====
Note: G = Games played; AB = At bats; H = Hits; Avg. = Batting average; HR = Home runs; RBI = Runs batted in

| Player | G | AB | H | Avg. | HR | RBI |
|---|---|---|---|---|---|---|
| Craig Paquette | 72 | 252 | 49 | .194 | 4 | 20 |
| Damian Jackson | 81 | 245 | 63 | .320 | 1 | 25 |
| George Lombard | 72 | 241 | 58 | .241 | 5 | 13 |
| Ramón Santiago | 65 | 222 | 54 | .243 | 4 | 20 |
| Dmitri Young | 54 | 201 | 57 | .284 | 7 | 27 |
| Mike Rivera | 39 | 132 | 30 | .227 | 1 | 11 |
| José Macías | 33 | 107 | 25 | .234 | 0 | 6 |
| Hiram Bocachica | 34 | 103 | 23 | .223 | 4 | 8 |
| Jacob Cruz | 35 | 88 | 24 | .273 | 2 | 6 |
| Matt Walbeck | 27 | 85 | 20 | .273 | 0 | 3 |
| Omar Infante | 18 | 72 | 24 | .235 | 0 | 3 |
| Andrés Torres | 19 | 70 | 14 | .200 | 0 | 3 |
| Eric Munson | 18 | 59 | 11 | .186 | 2 | 5 |
| Mitch Meluskey | 8 | 27 | 6 | .222 | 0 | 0 |
| Craig Monroe | 13 | 25 | 3 | .120 | 1 | 1 |
| Oscar Salazar | 8 | 21 | 4 | .190 | 1 | 3 |
| Dean Palmer | 4 | 12 | 0 | .000 | 0 | 0 |
| Ryan Jackson | 4 | 6 | 2 | .333 | 0 | 0 |

=== Pitching ===
==== Starting and other pitchers ====
Note: G = Games pitched; IP = Innings pitched; W = Wins; L = Losses; ERA = Earned run average; SO = Strikeouts

| Player | G | IP | W | L | ERA | SO |
|---|---|---|---|---|---|---|
| Mark Redman | 30 | 203.0 | 8 | 15 | 4.21 | 109 |
| Steve Sparks | 32 | 189.0 | 8 | 16 | 5.52 | 98 |
| Mike Maroth | 21 | 128.2 | 6 | 10 | 4.41 | 58 |
| Jeff Weaver | 17 | 121.2 | 6 | 8 | 3.18 | 75 |
| Adam Bernero | 28 | 101.2 | 4 | 7 | 6.20 | 69 |
| José Lima | 20 | 68.1 | 4 | 6 | 7.77 | 33 |
| Brian Powell | 13 | 57.2 | 1 | 5 | 4.84 | 30 |
| Nate Cornejo | 9 | 50.0 | 1 | 5 | 5.04 | 23 |
| Seth Greisinger | 8 | 37.2 | 2 | 2 | 6.21 | 14 |
| Andy Van Hekken | 5 | 30.0 | 1 | 3 | 3.00 | 5 |
| Brian Moehler | 3 | 19.2 | 1 | 1 | 2.29 | 13 |
| Shane Loux | 3 | 14.0 | 0 | 3 | 9.00 | 7 |
| Jason Beverlin | 3 | 12.1 | 0 | 3 | 9.49 | 7 |

==== Relief pitchers ====
Note: G = Games pitched; W = Wins; L = Losses; SV = Saves; ERA = Earned run average; SO = Strikeouts

| Player | G | W | L | SV | ERA | SO |
|---|---|---|---|---|---|---|
| Juan Acevedo | 65 | 1 | 5 | 28 | 2.65 | 43 |
| Jamie Walker | 57 | 1 | 1 | 1 | 3.71 | 40 |
| Jeff Farnsworth | 44 | 2 | 3 | 0 | 5.79 | 28 |
| José Paniagua | 41 | 0 | 1 | 1 | 5.83 | 34 |
| Julio Santana | 38 | 3 | 5 | 0 | 2.84 | 38 |
| Óscar Henríquez | 30 | 1 | 1 | 2 | 4.50 | 23 |
| Fernando Rodney | 20 | 1 | 3 | 0 | 6.00 | 10 |
| Matt Anderson | 12 | 2 | 1 | 0 | 9.00 | 8 |
| Eric Eckenstahler | 7 | 1 | 0 | 0 | 5.63 | 13 |
| Franklyn Germán | 7 | 1 | 0 | 1 | 0.00 | 6 |
| Danny Patterson | 6 | 0 | 2 | 0 | 15.00 | 1 |
| Matt Perisho | 5 | 0 | 0 | 0 | 8.71 | 3 |
| Terry Pearson | 4 | 0 | 0 | 0 | 10.50 | 4 |
| Matt Miller | 2 | 0 | 0 | 0 | 13.50 | 1 |
| Kris Keller | 1 | 0 | 0 | 0 | 27.00 | 1 |
| Jason Jiménez | 1 | 0 | 0 | 0 | 27.00 | 0 |
| Erik Sabel | 1 | 0 | 0 | 0 | inf | 0 |

== Awards and records ==
- On July 2, the White Sox and Tigers set a Major League record by hitting 12 home runs in one game.

== Farm system ==
| Level | Team | League | Manager |
|---|---|---|---|
| AAA | Toledo Mud Hens | International League | Bruce Fields |
| AA | Erie SeaWolves | Eastern League | Kevin Bradshaw |
| A | Lakeland Tigers | Florida State League | Gary Green |
| A | West Michigan Whitecaps | Midwest League | Phil Regan |
| A-Short Season | Oneonta Tigers | New York–Penn League | Randy Ready |
| Rookie | GCL Tigers | Gulf Coast League | Howard Bushong |
