= Christopher Mears =

Christopher Mears may refer to:

- Chris Mears (baseball) (born 1978), Canadian baseball pitcher
- Chris Mears (diver) (born 1993), British diver
