= Jeremy Bonderman =

American baseball player (born 1982)

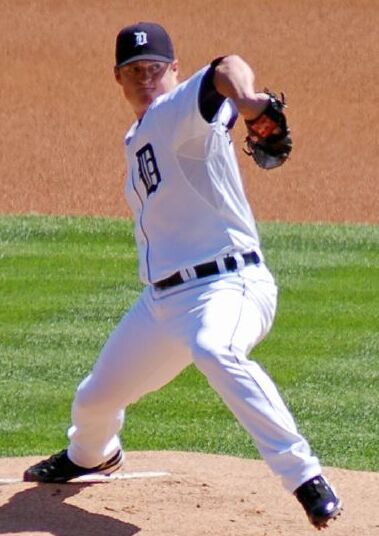
- Bonderman with the Detroit Tigers
- Pitcher
- Born: October 28, 1982 (age 43); Kennewick, Washington, U.S.
- Batted: Right Threw: Right

MLB debut
- April 2, 2003, for the Detroit Tigers

Last MLB appearance
- September 21, 2013, for the Detroit Tigers

MLB statistics
- Win–loss record: 69–81
- Earned run average: 4.91
- Strikeouts: 961
- Stats at Baseball Reference

Teams
- Detroit Tigers (2003–2010); Seattle Mariners (2013); Detroit Tigers (2013)
Medals
Men's baseball
Representing United States
World Junior Baseball Championship
| Silver medal – second place | 2000 Edmonton | Team |

Jeremy Allen Bonderman (born October 28, 1982) is an American former professional baseball pitcher. Bonderman played in Major League Baseball for the Detroit Tigers and Seattle Mariners from 2003 to 2010 and in 2013.

== High school ==
Bonderman attended Pasco High School in Pasco, Washington. In his last year of high school baseball, he went 5–2 and recorded a 3.60 earned run average (ERA). He is the only high school junior ever to be drafted with a first round pick in baseball history. He had passed his GED tests and successfully petitioned Major League Baseball (MLB) to become draft-eligible.

== Professional career ==
=== Draft and minor leagues ===
The Oakland Athletics selected Bonderman out of high school with the 26th pick in the 2001 Major League Baseball draft, a selection that, according to Michael Lewis's Moneyball, caused Athletics general manager Billy Beane to throw a chair through a wall in fury.

On July 6, 2002, Bonderman was involved in a three-team deal. The Athletics had sent Carlos Peña, a player to be named later (who later became Bonderman), and Franklyn Germán to the Detroit Tigers. The New York Yankees sent Ted Lilly, John-Ford Griffin, and Jason Arnold to the Athletics. The Tigers sent Jeff Weaver to the Yankees and cash to the Athletics.

=== Detroit Tigers ===
Bonderman debuted in the major leagues when he was 20 years old. His major league debut came against the Minnesota Twins, who scored six runs in four innings. In his rookie campaign of 2003, the Tigers finished with the second-worst record in MLB history at 43–119 and came close to being the first team with two pitchers who each lost 20 games in a season since Wilbur Wood and Stan Bahnsen with the 1973 Chicago White Sox. With a 6–18 record, he was removed from the starting rotation by manager Alan Trammell on September 3. One night after Mike Maroth lost his 21st of the year, Bonderman was reinstated into the rotation but cemented a 6–19 record as the losing pitcher in his last decision of the season in a 6–2 defeat to the Twins at the Metrodome on September 19. The next season, Bonderman went 11–13 with a 4.89 ERA. In 2005, he had a 14–13 record and a 4.57 ERA. Bonderman was the Tigers Opening Day starter for the 2005 season.

In 2006 Bonderman finished with a 14–8 record, his career best and posted a 4.08 ERA. He started game four of the 2006 American League Division Series against the Yankees. He pitched five perfect innings before giving up a hit. He then pitched 3 1/3 more innings, surrendering only one run. Bonderman was the winning pitcher in the game that gave the Tigers the series. He pitched again in game four of the 2006 American League Championship Series, pitching six innings and giving up three runs. The Tigers would go on to win the game and series for the American League Pennant. In the World Series, he pitched six innings giving up two runs. He left the game with the Tigers in the lead. However, the Tigers would ultimately lose the game, as well as the series the following day.

In 2007, Bonderman had the best start of his career, but after the all-star break he struggled only winning four games, finishing 11–9 with a 5.01 ERA. He finished second in the 2007 All-Star Game Final vote.

Bonderman missed most of the 2008 season because he had procedures done to remove a blood clot in his axillary vein.

On June 13, 2009, five days after his only start of the season, Bonderman was placed on the disabled list indefinitely because of recurring pain in his pitching shoulder.

Bonderman started 29 games for the Tigers in 2010, going 8–10 with a league-worst 5.53 ERA. Following the season, he was granted free agency. Bonderman remained unsigned through the 2011 season.

=== Seattle Mariners ===
On December 21, 2012, Bonderman signed a minor league contract with the Seattle Mariners. The deal included an invitation to spring training. He made his first start for the major league club on June 2, and took the loss in a 10–0 win by the Minnesota Twins. On June 7, in his second start, he pitched three-hit ball for six innings to beat the New York Yankees and earn his first win since 2010. He was designated for assignment on July 8, 2013, following consecutive poor starts. He elected free agency on July 11.

=== Detroit Tigers (second stint) ===
On July 14, 2013, Bonderman was signed to a minor league deal bringing him back to Detroit, playing for the Triple-A Toledo Mud Hens. On August 5, Bonderman was recalled from the Mud Hens, to join the Tigers bullpen. In his first appearance back with Detroit, Bonderman pitched three innings of scoreless relief in the Tigers 6–5 victory over the Cleveland Indians, to earn his first career victory in relief. He became a free agent following the season.

== Pitching style ==
Bonderman threw four pitches, relying primarily on a two-seam fastball at 89–93 mph. His other pitches included a slider at 80–82 mph, a four-seam fastball at 89–92 mph, a changeup at 85–88 mph, and rarely a cutter at 86 mph.

== Personal life ==
Bonderman resides in Pasco, Washington with his wife Amber and their two children.
