= Adam Bernero =

American baseball player (born 1976)

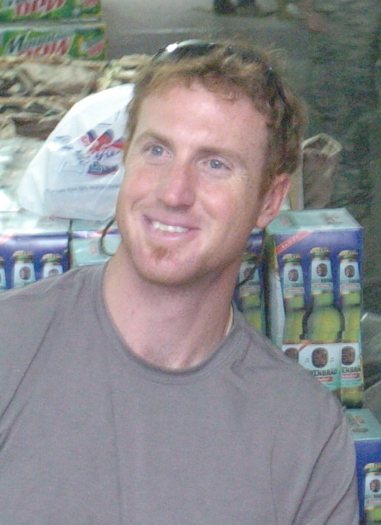
- Bernero in Iraq in 2007
- Pitcher
- Born: November 28, 1976 (age 49); Los Gatos, California, United States
- Batted: Right Threw: Right

MLB debut
- August 1, 2000, for the Detroit Tigers

Last MLB appearance
- September 30, 2006, for the Kansas City Royals

MLB statistics
- Win–loss record: 11–27
- Earned run average: 5.91
- Strikeouts: 247
- Stats at Baseball Reference

Teams
- Detroit Tigers (2000–2003); Colorado Rockies (2003–2004); Atlanta Braves (2005); Philadelphia Phillies (2006); Kansas City Royals (2006)

Adam Gino Bernero (born November 28, 1976) is an American former professional baseball player. A pitcher, Bernero played in Major League Baseball (MLB) for the Detroit Tigers from 2000 to 2003, the Colorado Rockies in 2003 and 2004, the Atlanta Braves in 2005, and the Philadelphia Phillies and Kansas City Royals in 2006. He serves as a mental performance coach for the Seattle Mariners.

In 1999, Bernero was signed by the Tigers out of NCAA Division II Armstrong Atlantic State University in Savannah, Georgia. After about a year in the minor leagues, Bernero was called up to the major-league team in July 2000 and made his MLB debut on August 1, 2000, against the Anaheim Angels. Bernero spent four seasons with the Tigers, where he served as both a starting pitcher and relief pitcher, spending time on both the major-league squad and in the minors. He set a team record for most consecutive starts without a win when, following a June 10, 2002, win against the Montreal Expos, he went 17 starts before recording another win against the New York Yankees on June 1, 2003.

Bernero was then traded to the Rockies in the middle of the 2003 season in exchange for catcher and outfielder Ben Petrick. In Colorado, Bernero served primarily as a reliever and also spent time in both the majors and minors before being released at the conclusion of the 2004 season. The Braves picked him up in 2004, and after a successful spring, Bernero made the Opening Day roster. Bernero spent time with both the Phillies and the Royals in 2006. After being designated for assignment by the Phillies, Bernero elected free agency and chose to sign for the Royals, where he made his final major-league appearance on September 30, 2006. He had an 11–27 record, a 5.91 earned run average, and 247 strikeouts in his career.

Bernero tried unsuccessfully to return to MLB in 2007, when Tommy John surgery prevented him from playing the season after being a spring invitee by the Boston Red Sox, and in 2008, when he played four games for the Indianapolis Indians, the AAA affiliate of the Pittsburgh Pirates. After baseball, Bernero began coaching. In 2017, he served as the mental performance coach for the Toronto Blue Jays before moving to the Mariners the following year, where he remains.

== Early life ==
Adam Bernero was born on November 28, 1976, in Los Gatos, California. His father, Gino, married Susan Roberts when Bernero was five. Although they divorced when Adam was ten, Roberts remained close to him. Gino subsequently married Janet Bernero, and started his son on private hitting and pitching lessons when Adam was about 13.

He attended John F. Kennedy High School in Sacramento, California, where he played on the varsity baseball team. Joe Davidson of The Sacramento Bee described Bernero as a "capable and willing arm" during his junior season and "one of the area's top arms" in the lead-up to his senior season.

Bernero was selected in the 24th round of the 1994 Major League Baseball draft by the Chicago White Sox, but did not sign. Instead, Bernero opted to attend Sacramento City College, where he pitched. Bernero was selected out of SCC in the 38th round of the 1996 Major League Baseball draft by the Colorado Rockies, but again chose not to sign. Bernero continued to play at SCC, and during the summer of 1997 played for the Santa Barbara Foresters of the California Collegiate League. Bernero spent the 1998 season with NAIA-affiliated Culver–Stockton College in Canton, Missouri.

In 1999, Bernero moved to the Division II Armstrong Atlantic State Pirates of Savannah, Georgia. There, Bernero earned multiple Peach Belt Athletic Conference Pitcher of the Week awards, finishing the regular season with an 11–2 record across 96.1 innings of work, posting a 2.99 earned run average with 103 strikeouts.

== Professional career ==
=== Minor leagues ===
In May 1999, Bernero met with Detroit Tigers scout Jeff Wetherby at a Denny's restaurant near Armstrong Atlantic State. Wetherby forgot to bring an official contract with him, and Bernero ended up signing his first major-league contract on a napkin, making him a member of the Tigers organization for $8,000. The Tigers had narrowly beaten out the Atlanta Braves, who failed to locate the correct diner.

A few short weeks ago, Adam Bernero was looking over the late-night menu at Denny's and was thoughtfully pondering the future. Deli Dinger or Super Bird? Grand Slam or Moons Over My Hammy? A meeting the next day with the Atlanta Braves or an offer on the table from the Detroit Tigers to play professional baseball right away? The 22-year-old free-agent pitcher knew what would satisfy his appetite.

— Brian VanOchten, "Bernero baffles Wizards in dazzling home debut", The Grand Rapids Press (June 4, 1999)

Bernero made his professional debut for the Class-A West Michigan Whitecaps on May 29, 1999, at Marinelli Field in Rockford, Illinois. Bernero gave up three home runs in the 7–2 loss against the Rockford Reds. In the month of June, Bernero posted a 5–0 record with a 0.99 earned run average, being named Detroit's Minor League Pitcher of the Month. Bernero missed most of August after experiencing shoulder stiffness during an August 5 start. Bernero finished the season with an 8–4 record in 15 appearances. Reporter Brian VanOcthen of The Grand Rapids Press gave Bernero an end-of-season grade of "A-", describing him as a standout prospect who "showed he has the right stuff." Bernero's 2.54 ERA led all Tigers minor leaguers. Tigers head of scouting described Bernero as having "phenomenal numbers," saying he "might have been the best pitcher in the Midwest League."

Bernero started the 2000 season with the Double-A Jacksonville Suns. In his first start against the Carolina Mudcats on April 8, Bernero threw four scoreless innings before being pulled for shoulder tightness. The tightness proved to be a more serious injury, as Bernero was placed on the disabled list (DL) for a sprained elbow. Bernero returned to the mound on April 29. Bernero was called up to the Toledo Mud Hens on June 21, 2000. Despite a 2-5 record, Bernero had a 2.79 ERA in ten starts to that point.

Bernero's first start as a Mud Hen coincided with Dave Anderson's final day as manager in Toledo. Bernero pitched six solid innings against the Ottawa Lynx, allowing only one run. Through Bernero's first seven starts with the Mud Hens, he posted a 3–1 record with a 2.48 ERA. A July 26 article in The Blade noted that "if Adam Bernero keeps this up much longer, the Detroit Tigers may start believing he's the best find they've had in some time."

=== Detroit Tigers (2000–2003) ===
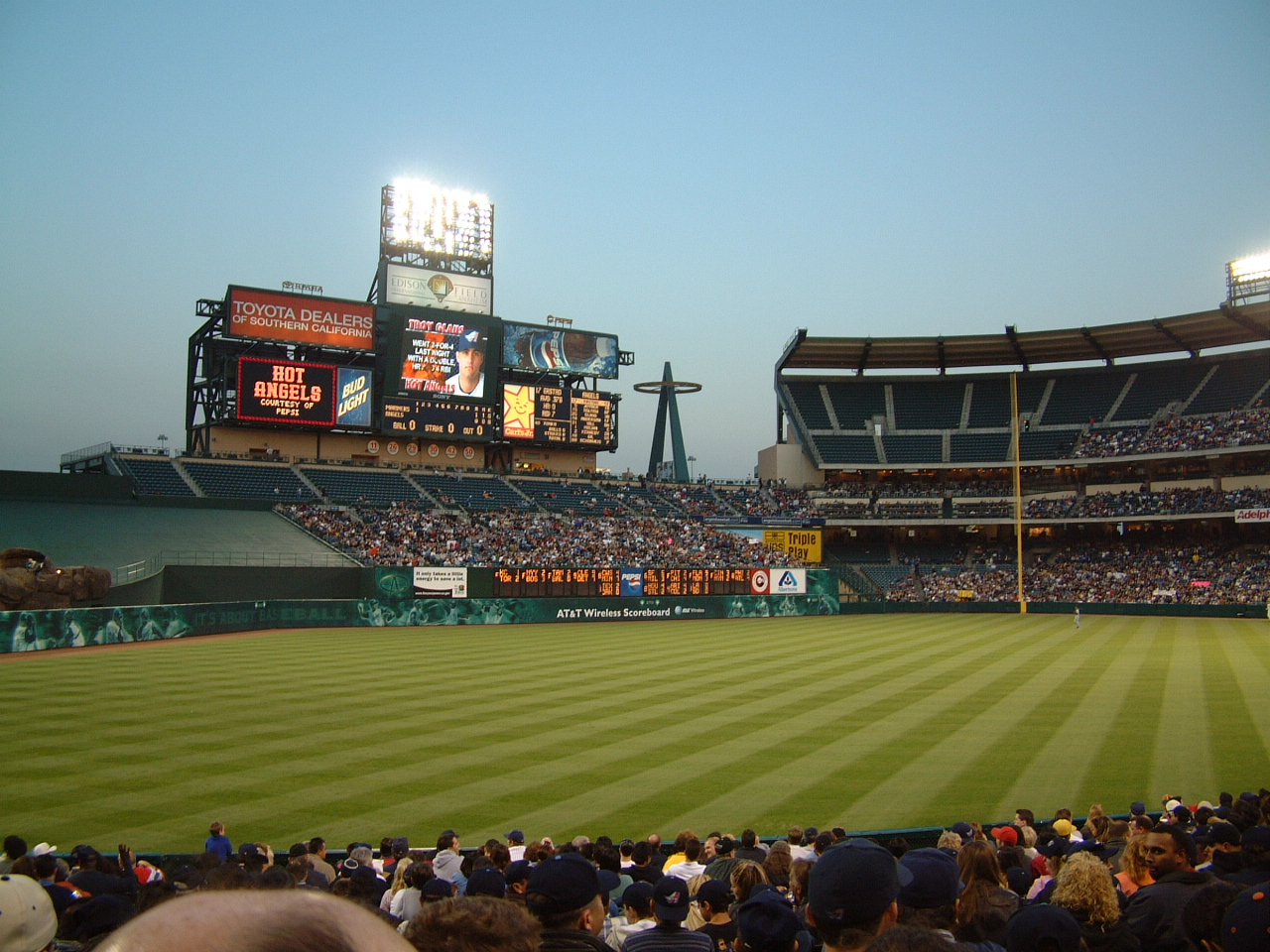
Edison Field in Anaheim, California, where Bernero made his major-league debut

On July 31, 2000, Bernero was called up to the major-league roster to replace starting pitcher Dave Mlicki, who underwent surgery to correct a sinus issue. Bernero made his MLB debut the following day against the Anaheim Angels at Edison Field in Anaheim, California. That game, he struck out the first major-league hitter he faced, Darin Erstad. He ended the night with five strikeouts and two earned runs through five and two-thirds innings. Although the Tigers won 6–3, Bernero was credited with a no decision as the game was tied when he was relieved.

Bernero made four starts during the 2000 season before transitioning to a bullpen role, serving as the team's long reliever. He finished with an 0–1 record and a 4.19 ERA in his rookie season, tallying 34.1 innings pitched.

Prior to the 2001 season, Bernero was considered a contender for the fifth spot in the starting rotation. Manager Phil Garner said that while Steve Sparks tentatively had the spot, he would allow Dave Borkowski, Matt Perisho, and Bernero to compete for it. Despite this, Bernero was sent to the minor league complex during spring training. Bernero spent most of his 2001 season in Toledo, compiling a 6–11 record and 5.13 ERA before being called up to the Tigers on September 4. In five appearances in relief for the major-league squad, Bernero compiled a 7.30 ERA in 12.1 innings with eight strikeouts.

Bernero once again started the season in Toledo for the 2002 season, having been optioned there on March 16 that year. Prior to a May 26 game against the Chicago White Sox, Bernero was called up to replace struggling rookie pitcher Nate Cornejo. During his time with the Mud Hens, Bernero finished with a 1.57 ERA in 57 and a third innings, good for second-highest in the International League at the time. In his first major-league start of the season, Bernero picked up his first MLB win since 2000 in a 9–2 win against the White Sox. Following a June 10, 2002, pitching win against the Montreal Expos, Bernero went 17 starts without recording a win, setting a Tigers team record.

During spring training in 2003, Bernero was noted as a contender for the starting roster, though USA Today clarified that the Tigers' rotation was still up in the air. Manager Alan Trammell announced that Bernero earned a starting spot following a March 20 game against the Boston Red Sox, in which he went five innings, allowing three runs on five hits.

Bernero broke the winless streak on June 1, 2003, when the Tigers defeated the New York Yankees, 4–2. During that stretch, Bernero carried a 2–11 record, with both wins coming in relief. Bernero and teammate Mike Maroth were noted for their bad luck while pitching during this stretch. Immediately following the third time the Tigers had been shut out while Bernero took the mound, a May 10, 2003, piece from The Grand Rapids Press compared Bernero's 4.87 ERA and no wins with Toronto pitcher Cory Lidle's 4.94 ERA and five wins, a critique on the Tigers offense's poor run support. A May 21 piece from the Kalamazoo Gazette, following Bernero's sixth loss, identified Bernero as the pitcher with the least run support in the MLB, with 1.51 offensive runs scored per nine innings.

Bernero started six more times for the Tigers in 2003 and was credited with a loss in all of them. His final appearance for the Tigers came in relief on July 6 against the Kansas City Royals. At the time of his departure, Bernero had a 1–12 record with a 6.08 ERA across 17 starts and one relief appearance. He continued to have the lowest run support in the league, with only 2.50 offensive runs per nine innings pitched.

=== Colorado Rockies (2003–2004) ===
On July 13, 2003, Bernero was traded to the Colorado Rockies in exchange for catcher and outfielder Ben Petrick. Rockies manager Clint Hurdle said that Bernero would be used as a long reliever, in an effort to replace struggling reliever Nelson Cruz.

He's dealt with a lot of adversity and has a history of competing and overachieving. ... We like his stuff, especially when we break down the first 30 pitches. ... We thought it was a good baseball deal.

— Rockies manager Clint Hurdle (July 15, 2003)

Bernero made his Rockies debut on July 17, 2003, against the San Francisco Giants, where he pitched the fifth inning in relief. Bernero made 30 appearances for the Rockies during the 2003 season, and picked up five holds, two blown leads, and two losses.

Prior to the 2004 season, Bernero was assessed by The Denver Post as a pitcher who "will be stretched out as a starter in the spring" and as a competitor for the major-league rotation. It was further reported that Hurdle would give Bernero at least "an initial shot" at the starting job, according to Rocky Mountain News reporting. After a March 7 start, Bernero was placed under throwing restrictions due to a right shoulder injury. An MRI exam showed inflammation, but no substantial damage. Despite this, the shoulder impingement caused Bernero to exit a minor-league game on March 28 after nine pitches, and start the regular season on the 60-day DL.

Bernero made his first start of the 2004 season on June 2 for the Double-A Tulsa Drillers as part of his rehab effort. In that start, which Tulsa World reporter Barry Lewis described as a possible "audition for a spot in the Colorado Rockies' starting rotation," Bernero threw six scoreless innings. Bernero, still in rehab, was then promoted to the Triple-A Colorado Springs Sky Sox for a start on June 14. He pitched seven scoreless innings in his first Sky Sox appearance. Bernero was activated from the DL on July 1, with right-hander Marc Kroon sent down in a subsequent move. Bernero earned his first win as a member of the Rockies on July 4 against Detroit, his former team. Bernero was optioned back to Colorado Springs on August 14, before rejoining the major-league team on September 7 after his contract was purchased. Bernero finished 2004 with a 1–1 record with one blown save and a hold. He amassed a 5.57 ERA and 21 strikeouts in 32.1 innings of work.

=== Atlanta Braves (2005) ===
Bernero was a free agent following the 2004 season. On January 8, 2005, Bernero was invited to spring training by the Atlanta Braves. In a March 16 interview with the Anderson Independent-Mail, Bernero said that he turned down offers from about ten different major league teams, instead opting to be a "longshot" with the contending Braves, who won the National League East with a 96-66 record the year prior. "I've learned that being the 12th guy on a winning team is better than being the ace on a losing team," Bernero said. In a March 18 article in The Atlanta Constitution, sportswriter David O'Brien deemed Bernero a "reclamation project," noting that should Bernero succeed in Atlanta, it "would go down as one of the biggest (Leo Mazzone) turnaround jobs to date." O'Brien also noted that Bernero seemingly had Braves manager Bobby Cox in his corner. After a March 16 sixth-inning appearance against the Washington Nationals in which Bernero struck out two, Cox said, "He's got a bunch of good pitches. Every once in a while you find a guy like that in camp."

It should be a good bullpen, Bernero is sort of the surprise guy. He's striking out a lot of hitters down here. He was invited as a free agent. Sometimes you hit paydirt on that.

— Bobby Cox (March 18, 2005)

Dubbed by Associated Press sportswriter Charles Odom as "perhaps the biggest surprise of the Braves' camp" in a March 26 article, Bernero had a 2.25 ERA before a March 24 game against the Yankees, in which he gave up four runs in one inning. Bernero finished the spring with a 7.36 ERA and 15 strikeouts, having at first pitched seven scoreless innings before giving up nine runs in his last four. Despite ending on a sour note, Bernero earned a bullpen roster spot for Opening Day. Bernero made his first appearance out of the bullpen on Opening Day on April 5 against the Florida Marlins, giving up two runs in the 9-0 Braves loss. Bernero got his first win as a Brave the next day, pitching two scoreless innings in extra innings against the Marlins.

On July 16, Bernero was sent down to the Triple-A Richmond Braves in exchange for veteran pitcher Jay Powell. Through 47.0 innings of work up to that point, Bernero had an ERA of 6.51. Bernero remained in Richmond for the remainder of the season, finishing with a major-league record of 4–3 for the year.

=== Kansas City Royals (2006) ===
On November 21, 2005, Bernero signed a minor-league contract with the Kansas City Royals. In an early spring assessment of the Royals by The Kansas City Star, Bernero was described as an "experienced arm" that was "ticketed for (the Omaha Royals)," the Royals' Triple-A affiliate. Indeed, following spring training, Bernero was assigned to Omaha and started the 2006 season there. When Royals starter Mark Redman was out of action for an arm injury and family bereavement concerns, Benero was initially planned to be called up to the major-league roster to serve as an emergency starter on May 24. Bernero, however, had the flu, leading the Royals to call up Jimmy Gobble instead. Bernero took a 2-2 record and 3.27 ERA into June, before being granted a release on June 2.

=== Philadelphia Phillies (2006) ===
Bernero was signed by the Philadelphia Phillies and was assigned to the Triple-A Scranton/Wilkes-Barre Red Barons on June 5, 2006. For Bernero, the move was an effort to play for a contender.

I just got tired of playing for losing (major league) teams. I got enough of that when I was in Detroit. The Phillies are in a pennant race, and I really feel like I can help them.

— Adam Bernero (June 25, 2006)

Phillies vice president Mike Arbuckle clarified to the Courier-Post that Bernero would likely not see much playing time in the major leagues, saying "in a stop-gap measure, he can help us at the major league level but we signed him to help our Triple-A club." Bernero pitched well for the Red Barons, described by Van Rose of the Times Leader as "the most dominant pitcher on the staff." Bernero amassed a 1-1 record, 1.88 ERA, and 15 strikeouts in four appearances before being called up to the major-league squad on June 28 in place of starter Brett Myers, who had taken a leave of absence for personal and legal troubles.

In his first and only game with the Phillies, a June 30 start against the Toronto Blue Jays, Bernero surrendered eight runs in two innings in an 8-1 loss. The team designated him for assignment on July 4. After clearing waivers, Bernero opted to become a free agent.

=== Second stint with the Royals (2006) ===
On July 14, 2006, Bernero signed with the Royals and was assigned to Omaha. Bernero was called up on August 11 by the Royals for a series opener against the Cleveland Indians, having amassed a 3-0 record in three starts and giving up only three runs in 20 innings for Omaha up to that point. Bernero made his debut the same day, going five and two-thirds innings in the start, allowing only one run and seven hits. Following the game, Royals manager Buddy Bell said that the team would utilize a six-man starting rotation, allowing Bernero to stay on the major-league roster as a starter.

In an August 17 game against the Chicago White Sox, Bernero pitched six scoreless innings and earned his first major-league win as a starter since 2003. Bernero was placed on the DL with elbow inflammation after the game. Bernero was reinstated from the DL on September 10, with the Royals' intention of using him as a reliever for the rest of the season. Bernero's first appearance back from the DL, a September 30 bullpen appearance against the Detroit Tigers, was his final major-league game. In one-and-one-thirds innings, Bernero gave up one run.

=== Boston Red Sox (2007) ===
Bernero was a non-roster invitee to spring training by the Boston Red Sox for the 2007 season. However, he underwent Tommy John surgery with Dr. James Andrews at the beginning of March, ending his season.

=== Pittsburgh Pirates (2008) ===
On December 14, 2007, Bernero signed a minor-league contract with the Pittsburgh Pirates. With the Indianapolis Indians, Bernero made his first pitching appearance since 2006 against the Norfolk Tides on May 2, 2008. Bernero pitched four innings, allowing two runs. Bernero left a May 18 start against the Louisville Bats with right elbow soreness after two innings, the same elbow that was reconstructed the previous year. Two days later, Bernero was placed on the minor-league DL. He was granted free agency by the Pirates on November 3.

== Post-playing activities ==
An avid fly fisherman, Bernero took his first job outside of baseball as a summer fishing guide in Alaska, in an effort to "get as far as possible from the game and the doctors," according to a 2015 Sports Illustrated article. In September 2015, Bernero began pursuing a master's degree in sports and performance psychology at the University of Denver, with the intent of helping athletes prepare for retirement.

Bernero was named the pitching coach of the Bluefield Blue Jays, the rookie affiliate of the Toronto Blue Jays, ahead of the 2018 season, before becoming a peak performance coach for the Seattle Mariners before the 2019 season. Soon after, Bernero's title became mental performance coach. As part of the role, Bernero works one-on-one with players to improve mental health and wellness, including through ice bath therapy, which helps with body recovery, and breathing techniques. He also works one-on-one with players to enhance their mental skills, especially when under pressure. Bernero has mentioned in interviews that mentality proved to be a struggle during his career and that there was little mental coaching when he played. Mariners starter George Kirby has credited Bernero with helping him control his emotions. Kirby's outbursts had previously earned him the nickname of "Furious George."
