= Chris Spurling =

American baseball player (born 1977)

- Pitcher
- Born: June 28, 1977 (age 49); Dayton, Ohio, U.S.
- Batted: Right Threw: Right

MLB debut
- April 2, 2003, for the Detroit Tigers

Last MLB appearance
- September 29, 2007, for the Milwaukee Brewers

MLB statistics
- Win–loss record: 6–8
- Earned run average: 4.32
- Strikeouts: 99
- Stats at Baseball Reference

Teams
- Detroit Tigers (2003, 2005–2006); Milwaukee Brewers (2006–2007)

Christopher Michael Spurling (born June 28, 1977) is an American former professional baseball relief pitcher. He played in Major League Baseball for the Detroit Tigers and the Milwaukee Brewers. He was born in Dayton, Ohio, and attended Sinclair Community College. He also graduated from Northridge High School.

With the return of Todd Jones to the Detroit Tigers' closer role in late April 2006, Spurling was sent down to their Triple-A affiliate, the Toledo Mud Hens of the International League.

Spurling was drafted by the New York Yankees in the 41st round of the 1997 amateur draft. He has also been in the Pittsburgh Pirates and Atlanta Braves organizations.

On September 8, 2006, he was claimed off waivers from the Tigers by the Milwaukee Brewers. Spurling had a 2007 record of 2–1, with a 4.68 ERA, and 28 strikeouts. During spring training 2008, he was released by the Brewers.
