= Brian Kingman =

American baseball player (born 1953)

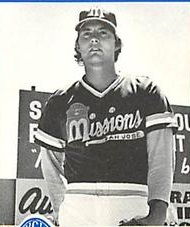
- Pitcher
- Born: July 27, 1953 (age 73); Los Angeles, California, U.S.
- Batted: Right Threw: Right

MLB debut
- June 28, 1979, for the Oakland Athletics

Last MLB appearance
- June 10, 1983, for the San Francisco Giants

MLB statistics
- Win–loss record: 23–45
- Earned run average: 4.13
- Strikeouts: 273
- Stats at Baseball Reference

Teams
- Oakland Athletics (1979–1982); San Francisco Giants (1983)

Brian Paul Kingman (born July 27, 1953) is an American former Major League Baseball pitcher from 1979 to 1983 for the Oakland Athletics and San Francisco Giants.

He attended the University of California, Santa Barbara before signing with the Athletics in 1975. In 1979, he went 7–2 in the Pacific Coast League and made his major league debut in June.

Kingman is most famous for losing 20 games in 1980. He remained the most current pitcher to do so for 23 years, until Mike Maroth lost 21 games for the Detroit Tigers in 2003. Kingman also pitched a career-high 211 1/3 innings in 1980. Kingman was mostly a starting pitcher (94 appearances, 82 starts) but on July 21, 1982, he picked up his one and only MLB save. Kingman pitched the final 2 1/3 innings to nail down a 6-4 Oakland victory over the Indians. He retired in 1984.

In 94 major league games, Kingman compiled a 23–45 record.
