= Franklyn Germán =

Dominican baseball player (born 1980)

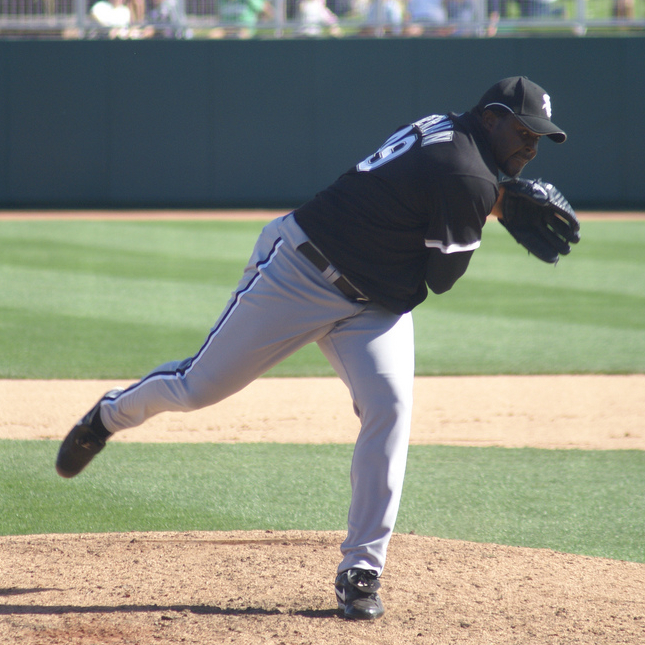
- Germán with the Chicago White Sox in spring training in 2009
- Relief pitcher
- Born: January 20, 1980 (age 46); San Cristóbal, Dominican Republic
- Batted: Right Threw: Right

MLB debut
- September 7, 2002, for the Detroit Tigers

Last MLB appearance
- May 20, 2008, for the Texas Rangers

MLB statistics
- Win–loss record: 9–7
- Earned run average: 4.25
- Strikeouts: 114
- Stats at Baseball Reference

Teams
- Detroit Tigers (2002–2005); Florida Marlins (2006); Texas Rangers (2008)

Franklyn Miguel Germán Madé (born January 20, 1980) is a Dominican former professional baseball relief pitcher. He played in Major League Baseball (MLB) for the Detroit Tigers, Florida Marlins, and Texas Rangers over parts of six seasons.

== Career ==
Germán joined the Oakland Athletics organization on July 2, 1996. He made his professional debut with the Arizona League Athletics in 1998, serving as the starting pitcher in 12 of his 14 appearances. In 1999, he was promoted to the low Class–A Southern Oregon Timberjacks, where he recorded a 3–5 record and an earned run average (ERA) of 5.99 in 15 starts. Germán split the 2000 season between the Vancouver Canadians and the Modesto A's. He started in 16 of his 26 appearances, tallying a 6–5 record and a 4.68 ERA.

Germán spent the entire 2001 season with the Visalia Oaks. Having converted from a starting pitcher to a reliever, he posted a 3.98 ERA in 53 appearances.

Germán was acquired by the Detroit Tigers on July 5, 2002, in a three-team trade between the Tigers, Oakland Athletics, and New York Yankees. Germán, first baseman Carlos Peña, and pitcher Jeremy Bonderman were traded by Oakland to Detroit in exchange for pitcher Jeff Weaver, whom Oakland then traded to New York for pitcher Ted Lilly, outfielder John-Ford Griffin, and minor league pitcher Jason Arnold. Germán never played for Oakland, though he did spend 1997–2002 with their rookie league, Single-A, and Double-A minor league affiliates before being traded.

Germán's inconsistency on the mound was in contrast to the Tigers' two primary starters at the time, Bonderman and lefty Mike Maroth, who were regarded to possess Major League talent, but frequently suffered from insufficient run support on a team in the midst of having the worst season in American League history — that year, the Tigers set a new record for total losses (119), eclipsing the previous record (117) held by the 1916 Philadelphia Athletics. After spending much of the 2004 season on the Tigers' Triple-A minor league team, the Toledo Mud Hens, his form on the mound improved greatly, and he made the Tigers' 2005 opening day roster.

After a mediocre spring training in 2006, the Tigers left Germán unprotected on the waiver wire by designating him for another assignment to Toledo. He did not clear waivers, however, and on April 4, 2006, he was claimed off waivers by the Florida Marlins, and earned a spot on their opening day roster.

Germán became a free agent after the 2006 season. On November 17, 2006, he signed a minor league contract with the Texas Rangers.

Germán pitched in the Rangers 2008 season opener against the Seattle Mariners on March 31, 2008. It was the first time Germán had pitched outside the minors since 2006. He was designated for assignment by the Rangers on May 21, 2008, and on May 30 declined a minor-league assignment and became a free agent.

On June 4, 2008, Germán signed a minor league contract with the Pittsburgh Pirates. He was traded to the Chicago White Sox on August 11, and assigned to Triple-A Charlotte. He became a free agent at the end of the season and re-signed with the Chicago White Sox. On July 10, 2009, Germán was released by the Chicago White Sox.

In 2011, Germán pitched for Diablos Rojos del Mexico of the Mexican League, posting a 4.15 ERA in seven appearances.

== Scouting report ==
He is a particularly large man for a pitcher, standing 6 ft 7 in (2.04 m) tall and weighing 298 lb (135 kg), which lends him a degree of batter intimidation, like most taller-than-average pitchers possess. He works mostly in middle relief and sometimes as a set-up man for the team's closer.

PITCHf/x data from 2008 records Germán throwing a four-seam fastball averaging about 94 mph and a changeup averaging 85 mph.

== Personal life ==
Germán is married and has one child with his wife, Luisa. They spend their off-seasons residing in Palenque, Dominican Republic.

Germán usually plays for Leones del Escogido in the Dominican Winter Baseball League, and played for the World Team during the 2002 All-Star Futures Game, which was won, 5–1, by the World Team.
