= Chris Mears (baseball) =

Canadian baseball player (born 1978)

Cleveland Guardians
- Pitcher / Coach
- Born: January 20, 1978 (age 48); Ottawa, Ontario, Canada
- Batted: Right Threw: Right

MLB debut
- June 29, 2003, for the Detroit Tigers

Last MLB appearance
- September 28, 2003, for the Detroit Tigers

MLB statistics
- Win–loss record: 1–3
- Earned run average: 5.44
- Strikeouts: 21
- Stats at Baseball Reference

Teams
- As player: Detroit Tigers (2003); As coach: Boston Red Sox (2020–2024); Cleveland Guardians (2025–present)

Christopher Peter Mears (born January 20, 1978) is a Canadian former professional baseball pitcher and current coach who serves as the pitching coordinator for the Arizona Diamondbacks of Major League Baseball (MLB). Mears previously played in MLB for the Detroit Tigers in 2003, and served as a pitching coordinator with the Boston Red Sox and pitching rehab lead for the Cleveland Guardians. As a player, the native of Ottawa, Ontario, threw and batted right-handed, stood 6 feet 4 inches (1.93 m) tall and weighed 190 pounds (86 kg) (13 stone, 8 pounds).

== Playing career ==
Mears attended Lord Byng Secondary School in Vancouver, British Columbia, and was a fifth-round selection of the Seattle Mariners in the 1996 Major League Baseball draft. He spent seven seasons in the Mariners' farm system, making it as far as their Double-A San Antonio Missions farm club before drawing his release following the 2002 season. Shortly thereafter, Mears signed with the Detroit Tigers and opened 2003 with Detroit's Triple-A team, the Toledo Mud Hens. He spent the first two months of the 2003 season in Toledo before having his contract purchased by the Tigers on June 29.

Mears spent his first nine weeks of big-league service in the Detroit bullpen, pitching fairly effectively and posting five saves. At the beginning of September, he was placed in Detroit's starting rotation, but his starting tenure was short-lived. The 2003 Tigers, who finished with the worst record in baseball since the 1962 Mets, were desperate for reliable pitching, but Mears proved inadequate as a starter, never pitching more than 41/3 innings per outing and racking up an earned run average over 10. After three starts, he spent the remainder of the 2003 season in the Tigers bullpen. His season total of five saves tied him for the team lead with Franklyn Germán.

Mears was returned to the minor leagues by Detroit for the 2004 season, before being released at season's end. He was part of Team Canada in the 2004 Summer Olympics, who finished in fourth place. Mears split 2005 between the Double-A affiliate of the St. Louis Cardinals and the Triple-A affiliate of the Atlanta Braves before retiring following the season.

During his Major League career, Mears appeared in 29 games pitched and worked 411/3 innings, allowing 50 hits and 11 bases on balls. He struck out 21.

== Post-playing career ==
In September 2015, Mears was promoted from being a Midwestern United States area scout to a role as the national pitching cross-checker for the Boston Red Sox. In January 2020, he was promoted to the role of pitching coordinator with the Red Sox.

On January 30, 2025, Mears was named the pitching rehab lead for the Cleveland Guardians.

Hired by Arizona Diamondbacks to be the Roving minor league Pitching Coordinator for 2026

https://www.si.com/mlb/diamondbacks/onsi/arizona-diamondbacks-news/d-backs-reveal-2026-player-development-staff

== See also ==
- List of Major League Baseball players from Canada
