= Eric Eckenstahler =

American baseball player (born 1976)

- Pitcher
- Born: December 17, 1976 (age 49); Waukegan, Illinois, U.S.
- Batted: Left Threw: Left

MLB debut
- September 9, 2002, for the Detroit Tigers

Last MLB appearance
- September 21, 2003, for the Detroit Tigers

MLB statistics
- Win–loss record: 1–0
- Earned run average: 3.80
- Strikeouts: 25
- Stats at Baseball Reference

Teams
- Detroit Tigers (2002–2003)

Eric Ryan Eckenstahler (born December 17, 1976) is an American former Major League Baseball (MLB) pitcher. Eckenstahler played for the Detroit Tigers in 2002 and 2003.

== Early life ==
Eckenstahler was born in Waukegan, Illinois. He attended Antioch Community High School in Antioch, Illinois and Illinois State University. He played for the Illinois State Redbirds baseball team in 1996, 1997, and 1999, although he did not appear in any games during the 1998 season. During his college career, Eckenstahler compiled a 14–7 record and a 5.40 earned run average in 36 games (31 starts).

== Professional career ==
Eckenstahler was drafted by the Houston Astros in 1995 and the New York Yankees, but he did not join either organization. After his senior college season, he was taken in the 32nd round of the 1999 MLB draft by the Detroit Tigers. Although he was drafted by Detroit on June 2, 1999, he waited nearly a full year before signing a contract with the Tigers on May 25, 2000.

Eckenstahler made his professional debut in 2000. He split the season between the low–Class A Oneonta Tigers and the mid–Class A West Michigan Whitecaps. He posted a 1.64 ERA in 8 appearances with Oneonta and a 5.79 ERA in 10 games (3 starts) with West Michigan. He split the 2001 season between the high–Class A Lakeland Tigers and the Class AA Erie SeaWolves. Eckenstahler posted a 1.50 ERA in only 4 appearances with Lakeland, whereas he recorded a 4–2 record and a 3.90 earned run average in 46 games with Erie.

In 2002, Eckenstahler began the season with the Class AAA Toledo Mud Hens of the International League. He saw action in 52 games with Toledo, posting a 4.43 ERA and a 2–4 record. He was promoted to the major leagues late in the season and made his MLB debut on September 9, pitching two scoreless innings against the Minnesota Twins. Overall, Eckenstahler appeared in 7 games for Detroit and posted a 5.63 ERA while striking out 13 batters in 8 innings.

Eckenstahler also split the 2003 season between Toledo and Detroit. He took the mound 39 times for Toledo, posting a 3–6 record and a 3.16 ERA in 42.2 innings. With Detroit, he saw action in 20 games and recorded a 2.87 ERA over 15.2 innings.

In 2004, Eckenstahler began the year with Toledo, where he made 42 appearances and tallied a 5.15 earned run average. On August 13, he was sent to the Chicago Cubs as a player to be named later in a trade which had sent Félix Sánchez to Detroit back in April. Eckenstahler posted a 3.60 ERA in 8 games with the Iowa Cubs, Chicago's Class AAA affiliate.

Eckenstahler was released by the Cubs on April 4, 2005, and he signed a contract with the Cincinnati Reds 12 days later. He made 35 appearances for the Chattanooga Lookouts, Cincinnati's Class AA affiliate. Eckenstahler struggled in his final professional season, posting a 9.24 ERA and recording 41 walks and 29 strikeouts over 37 innings.

== See also ==
- 2003 Detroit Tigers season
