= Gary Knotts =

American baseball player (born 1977)

- Pitcher
- Born: February 12, 1977 (age 48); Decatur, Alabama, U.S.
- Batted: Right Threw: Right

MLB debut
- July 28, 2001, for the Florida Marlins

Last MLB appearance
- October 2, 2004, for the Detroit Tigers

MLB statistics
- Win–loss record: 13–16
- Earned run average: 5.45
- Strikeouts: 162
- Stats at Baseball Reference

Teams
- Florida Marlins (2001–2002); Detroit Tigers (2003–2004)

Gary Everett Knotts (born February 12, 1977) is an American former professional baseball pitcher. He attended Northwest Shoals Community College and was selected by the Florida Marlins in the eleventh round of the 1995 Major League Baseball draft.

He made his major league debut for the Marlins in 2001 and was also with the club in 2002. On January 11, 2003, he was traded to the Detroit Tigers with pitchers Nate Robertson and Rob Henkel for pitchers Mark Redman and Jerrod Fuell. He pitched for the Tigers in 2003 and 2004, but was released in October 2005 after spending all of 2005 on the disabled list with a shoulder injury.

On July 31, 2007, Knotts was on the roster of the Newark Bears of the independent Atlantic League with a league best 2.65 ERA when he signed a minor league contract with the Philadelphia Phillies. The Phillies' assigned him to their Double-A Eastern League affiliate, Reading Phillies. He was traded to the Baltimore Orioles organization on August 22, 2008, for a player to be named later.

Knotts spent the 2009 season with the independent Bridgeport Bluefish of the Atlantic League. Knotts pitched in 26 games for the Bluefish, starting 24 of them, finishing with a 5-11 record and a 4.52 ERA. In 153 1/3 innings pitched, he gave up 168 hits, 58 walks, and struck out 118 batters.

Since his retirement after the 2009 season, Knotts is currently enrolled as a student at Calhoun Community College to pursue a degree in criminal justice. He also enters his first year as the Warhawks' pitching coach.

Knotts resides in Decatur, Alabama, with his wife Amanda and daughter Sophie.
