= Kris Keller =

American baseball player (born 1978)

- Pitcher
- Born: March 1, 1978 (age 48); Williamsport, Pennsylvania, U.S.
- Batted: Right Threw: Right

MLB debut
- May 24, 2002, for the Detroit Tigers

Last MLB appearance
- May 24, 2002, for the Detroit Tigers

MLB statistics
- Win–loss record: 0–0
- Earned run average: 27.00
- Strikeouts: 1
- Stats at Baseball Reference

Teams
- Detroit Tigers (2002)

Kristopher Shane Keller (born March 1, 1978) is an American former Major League Baseball pitcher who played for the majority of his career in the Detroit Tigers organization.

== High school ==
Although born in Williamsport, Pennsylvania, Keller attended Duncan U. Fletcher High School in Neptune Beach, Florida. At the end of his senior year 1996) Keller was considered a top prospect. During the regular season Keller struck out 101 in 70 2/3 innings of work and was selected to the Florida Athletic Coaches Association All-Star game. In the post-season Keller threw a no-hitter against rival Allen D. Nease Senior High School, striking out nine. USA Today named him an honorable mention on their All-USA High School Baseball team. Following graduation Keller planned to enter the major league draft, but indicated a willingness to postpone a professional career and enter college if he did not receive a good enough offer.

== Professional career ==
=== Detroit Tigers ===
The Detroit Tigers took Keller in the fourth round, and he reported to the Gulf Coast Tigers. Keller was pleased, remarking that "Coming from where I was supposed to be drafted, anywhere in the top five rounds was fine." Keller finished out the year in the Gulf Coast League, going 1–1 with a 2.38 ERA in six starts. Keller spent the next two years with the Low-A Jamestown Jammers and underwent a conversion from a starting pitcher to a closer. In 1998 he saved eight games and lowered his ERA to 3.27. The next the Tigers rewarded Keller with a promotion to the Single-A West Michigan Whitecaps where he went 5–3 as a relief pitcher with an additional eight saves and a 2.92 ERA. In 2000 moved up to the Double-A Jacksonville Suns. For Keller, it was an opportunity to pitch for a team which he had watched as a child: "It's been an awesome experience, playing again in front of my parents and buddies." Although Keller exhibited some control problems he saved 26 games with a 2.91 ERA. His 26 saves led the Southern League. At the end of the year Keller was considered a "top-flight closer."

The Tigers moved Keller up to the Triple-A Toledo Mud Hens for 2001 where his ERA ballooned to 4.48, his highest since 1997. Returning to Toledo for 2002, Keller lowered his ERA to 2.08 and commanded a fastball in the high 90s. On May 24 Keller received the call and headed for Detroit in place of Oscar Salazar. Keller made his major league debut that same evening in a game against the Chicago White Sox. Keller entered in the bottom of the 8th inning with Chicago already up 9–1 and gave up a three-run home run to Magglio Ordóñez. His one inning pitched that day proved to be the only inning he would pitch in the Major Leagues.

The next day the Tigers placed Keller on the disabled list with a "strained right triceps" and on June 20 traded him to the Atlanta Braves for outfielder George Lombard.

=== Around the minors ===
Atlanta assigned Keller to the Richmond Braves, their Triple-A affiliate. John Schuerholz, Atlanta's general manager, was optimistic about Keller: "We've got good reports on the guy and we think he's got the chance to give us another real power arm." Keller finished out the 2002 season with Richmond, going 1–0 with a 3.60 ERA. At the end of the year the Braves took Keller off the 40-man roster; without a contract and concerned by the strength of Atlanta's bullpen, was granted free agency and signed with the San Diego Padres, who sent him to the Triple-A Portland Beavers. The Padres released him in May after a rough start; in 18 appearances Keller was 1–1 with a 5.63 ERA. The Cincinnati Reds signed Keller to a minor league contract, and he spent the majority of the season with the Double-A Chattanooga Lookouts, minus a short stint with the Triple-A Louisville Bats.

The Reds granted Keller free agency at the end of the year and he signed with the Chicago White Sox, who assigned him to the Double-A Birmingham Barons. At the end of May Chicago released Keller; in fifteen appearances he was 0–3 with an 8.25 ERA. The Texas Rangers picked up Keller and sent him to the Double-A Frisco RoughRiders, but after Keller posted a 7.94 ERA in fourteen appearances Texas released him as well, marking the end of his professional career.
