= Ernie Young =

American baseball player (born 1969)

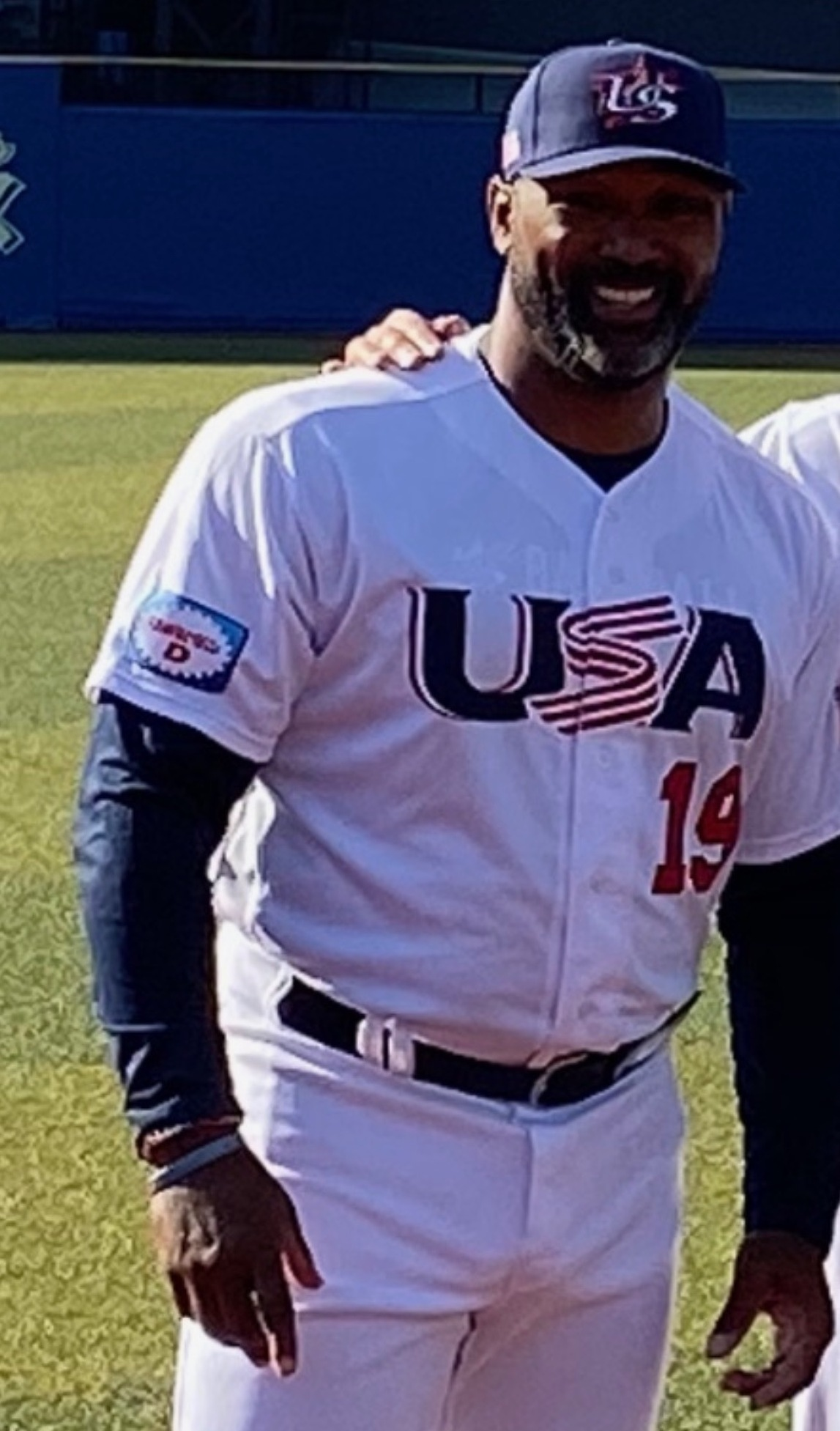
- Young with the USA Baseball in 2019
- Outfielder
- Born: July 8, 1969 (age 57); Chicago, Illinois, U.S.
- Batted: Right Threw: Right

Professional debut
- MLB: May 17, 1994, for the Oakland Athletics
- NPB: June 7, 2002, for the Yokohama BayStars

Last appearance
- NPB: September 15, 2002, for the Yokohama BayStars
- MLB: September 24, 2004, for the Cleveland Indians

MLB statistics
- Batting average: .225
- Home runs: 27
- Runs batted in: 90
- Stats at Baseball Reference

Teams
- Oakland Athletics (1994–1997); Kansas City Royals (1998); Arizona Diamondbacks (1999); Yokohama BayStars (2002); Detroit Tigers (2003); Cleveland Indians (2004)
Medals
Men's baseball
Representing the United States
Summer Olympics
Gold medal – first place	2000 Sydney	Team
Silver medal – second place	2020 Tokyo	Team

Ernest Wesley Young (born July 8, 1969) is an American former professional baseball outfielder and current coach for the United States national baseball team. He played in parts of eight seasons in Major League Baseball (MLB) for five different teams, primarily the Oakland Athletics. He also played one season in Japan for the Yokohama BayStars, and was a member of the United States' gold medal-winning baseball team at the 2000 Summer Olympics. As a player, Young was listed at 6 feet 1 inch (1.85 m) and 190 pounds (86 kg); he bats and throws right-handed. On July 19, 2013, he was inducted into the Buffalo Baseball Hall of Fame for his contributions during his time with the Buffalo Bisons.

== Playing career ==
In his major league career, Young played in 288 games, had 179 hits, 27 home runs, 90 RBI, 10 stolen bases, and a .225 batting average. In 2000, he led the Triple-A Memphis Redbirds with 35 home runs (second in the entire St. Louis Cardinals organization to Jim Edmonds' 42) and 98 RBIs (third in the organization behind Troy Farnsworth with 113 and Edmonds with 108). On June 12, 2006, he hit his 300th career minor league home run. As a member of the Oakland Athletics, in a game against the Tigers, Young started a triple play with a leaping catch in center field.

== Minor league coach/manager ==
Following his retirement after the 2007 season, Young became the hitting coach on the Chicago White Sox' rookie-level team, the Great Falls Voyagers. On November 21, 2008, he was named the manager of the Kannapolis Intimidators for the 2009 season. In 2011, Young was tabbed to manage the West Michigan Whitecaps, the class A affiliate of the Detroit Tigers, a position he retained for the 2012 season, but not for 2013.

== International career ==
As a player, Young won an Olympic gold medal as a member of the Team USA in baseball at the 2000 Summer Olympics, held in Sydney, Australia.

After his playing career ended, Young managed the national team for the 2011 Baseball World Cup (fourth-place finish) and 2011 Pan Am Games (second-place finish). Circa 2013, he served on the board of directors of USA Baseball.

In August 2019, Young became a national team coach for the 2019 WBSC Premier12 tournament. The team finished fourth in the tournament, and failed to qualify for the 2020 Olympics. In April 2021, Young was again named as a coach for the national team, for the team's final efforts to qualify for baseball at the 2020 Summer Olympics in Tokyo in 2021. The team qualified, with Young serving as hitting coach and first base coach for the Olympics. The team went on to win silver, falling to Japan in the gold-medal game.
