= Terry Pearson (baseball) =

American baseball player (born 1971)

- Pitcher
- Born: November 10, 1971 (age 54); Tuscaloosa, Alabama, U.S.
- Batted: Right Threw: Right

MLB debut
- April 4, 2002, for the Detroit Tigers

Last MLB appearance
- April 13, 2002, for the Detroit Tigers

MLB statistics
- Win–loss record: 0–0
- Earned run average: 10.50
- Strikeouts: 4
- Stats at Baseball Reference

Teams
- Detroit Tigers (2002)

Terry Bobby Gene Pearson (born November 10, 1971) is former Major League Baseball pitcher. Pearson played for the Detroit Tigers in 2002. Prior to his stint with the Tigers, Pearson attended Pickens Academy High School in Carrollton, Alabama and Livingston University, since renamed the University of West Alabama.
