= Matt Roney =

American baseball player (born 1980)

- Pitcher
- Born: January 10, 1980 (age 45); Tulsa, Oklahoma, U.S.
- Batted: Right Threw: Right

MLB debut
- April 2, 2003, for the Detroit Tigers

Last MLB appearance
- May 30, 2006, for the Oakland Athletics

MLB statistics
- Win–loss record: 1–10
- Earned run average: 5.42
- Strikeouts: 47
- Stats at Baseball Reference

Teams
- Detroit Tigers (2003); Oakland Athletics (2006)

Matthew Stephen Roney (born January 10, 1980) is an American former professional baseball pitcher. He played in Major League Baseball (MLB) for the Detroit Tigers and Oakland Athletics. Roney was drafted in the first round of the 1998 Major League Baseball draft by the Colorado Rockies.

In 2002 he was selected in the Rule 5 draft by the Pittsburgh Pirates and then purchased from the Pirates by the Detroit Tigers. In 2003 he made his major league debut with the Tigers, appearing in 45 games and starting 11 of those. He would compile an overall record of 1-9 with a 5.45 ERA before being released on July 3, 2005. He played for the Oakland Athletics in 2006 but spent much of that time in the minors with the Sacramento River Cats, appearing in only three MLB games.

He signed a major league contract for the 2007 season with the Toronto Blue Jays on November 13, 2006.

On April 30, 2007, Roney was suspended for 50 games for violation of baseball's minor league drug program. Roney tested positive for a "drug of abuse", which is separate from performance-enhancing drugs such as steroids or human growth hormone. After serving his suspension, Roney spent the rest of the 2007 season in the Blue Jays' farm system.
