= Ben Petrick =

American baseball player (born 1977)

- Catcher / Outfielder
- Born: April 7, 1977 (age 49); Salem, Oregon, U.S.
- Batted: Right Threw: Right

MLB debut
- September 1, 1999, for the Colorado Rockies

Last MLB appearance
- September 28, 2003, for the Detroit Tigers

MLB statistics
- Batting average: .257
- Home runs: 27
- Runs batted in: 94
- Stats at Baseball Reference

Teams
- Colorado Rockies (1999–2003); Detroit Tigers (2003)

Benjamin Wayne Petrick (/ˈpiːtrɪk/ PEE-trik; born April 7, 1977) is an American former Major League Baseball player. A native of Oregon, he grew up in Hillsboro, Oregon, in the Portland metropolitan area. After reaching the Majors, he was diagnosed with Parkinson's disease and retired in 2004, returning to Hillsboro to coach at his old high school. As of 2013 he has been a consultant for the Hillsboro Hops, a minor-league affiliate of the Arizona Diamondbacks, helping the team's young players acclimatize to life as a professional baseball player. He is the author of the book 40,000 to One.

== Early life ==
Petrick, who was born in Salem, Oregon, was a highly accomplished athlete while attending Glencoe High School in Hillsboro, Oregon. He played football, basketball and baseball. He was recruited to play college football as a safety. He ultimately signed a letter of intent to play college baseball for Arizona State. Petrick opted to enter the Colorado Rockies' farm system when they drafted him in the second round (38th overall) of the 1995 amateur draft and agreed to a signing bonus of $495,000.

== Minor leagues ==
His first season in the minors was for the single-A Asheville Tourists of the South Atlantic League in 1996. The next season, he spent with the high-A Salem Avalanche, and for the 1998 season he was promoted to the AA New Haven Ravens. Petrick then played for the AA Carolina Mudcats to start the 1999 season before being promoted to the Rockies' AAA affiliate, the Colorado Springs Sky Sox after 20 games.

== Major Leagues ==
He was called up to the Colorado Rockies for the first time in 1999 and hit .323 with 4 home runs in only 62 at-bats. In 2000, he hit .322 in 52 games for the major league club. However, he soon experienced a dramatic drop off in production, hitting only .238 in 85 games in 2001. On July 13, 2003, Petrick was acquired by the Detroit Tigers from Colorado in exchange for pitcher Adam Bernero. After an unsuccessful stint with the Tigers, Petrick was released. He attempted a brief comeback with the AAA Portland Beavers and the Toledo Mud Hens, and then retired.

Petrick is only the second player (after Bob O'Farrell) to record 4 RBI in a major league game without getting a hit. He achieved the feat in a 15–11 loss to the San Diego Padres on September 20, 2000, allowing his teammates to score by way of two ground outs, a sacrifice fly and a bases loaded walk.

== Later life ==
In May 2004, when Petrick announced his retirement from baseball, he disclosed that he had been diagnosed with Parkinson's disease after the 1999 season. He revealed that as time went on, it had become clear that despite the medication and treatment he was receiving, the effects of Parkinson's would no longer allow him to play baseball at a high level. At one point he stated that his symptoms were due to Lyme disease, but he has since returned to discussing Parkinson's as their cause.

Petrick did numerous interviews and spoke publicly about his story at various events and fundraisers in order to raise awareness of Parkinson's disease. His father Vern (former athletic director at Glencoe) also suffered from Parkinson's and died in January 2019.

Petrick has three daughters. He got remarried in Summer 2021, to Heidi (Springer) Petrick. Petrick’s aunt is Connie Ballmer, wife of Microsoft CEO and billionaire Steve Ballmer.

Petrick and Scott Brown have written a book called 40,000 to One (ISBN 0615583458), a collection of short stories from his life; The book was a New York Times best-seller in 2012 after ESPN aired a short film about Petrick.The film rights to the book were sold later that year.

In January 2013, the Hillsboro Hops announced that Petrick would join the Hops coaching staff as a consultant, assisting team "acclimating to life as a professional baseball player."

Petrick has developed a motivational website and clothing line called Strength Through Weakness; www.strengththroughweakness.com
