= Craig Paquette =

American baseball player (born 1969)

- Third baseman / Outfielder
- Born: March 28, 1969 (age 57); Long Beach, California, U.S.
- Batted: Right Threw: Right

MLB debut
- June 1, 1993, for the Oakland Athletics

Last MLB appearance
- April 24, 2003, for the Detroit Tigers

MLB statistics
- Batting average: .239
- Home runs: 99
- Runs batted in: 377
- Stats at Baseball Reference

Teams
- Oakland Athletics (1993–1995); Kansas City Royals (1996–1997); New York Mets (1998); St. Louis Cardinals (1999–2001); Detroit Tigers (2002–2003)
Medals
Men's baseball
Representing United States
Pan American Games
Silver medal – second place	1999 Winnipeg	Team competition

Craig Harold Paquette (/pɑːˈkɛt/; born March 28, 1969) is an American former professional baseball third baseman. He played in Major League Baseball (MLB) for the Oakland Athletics, Kansas City Royals, New York Mets, St. Louis Cardinals, and Detroit Tigers. In 2007, he played for the Camden Riversharks of the independent Atlantic League of Professional Baseball.

A native of Long Beach, California, Paquette attended Rancho Alamitos High School and then went on to play college baseball for Golden West College. In 1988, he played collegiate summer baseball with the Brewster Whitecaps of the Cape Cod Baseball League. He was selected by Oakland in the 8th round of the 1989 MLB draft.
