= Jamie Walker (baseball) =

American baseball player (born 1971)

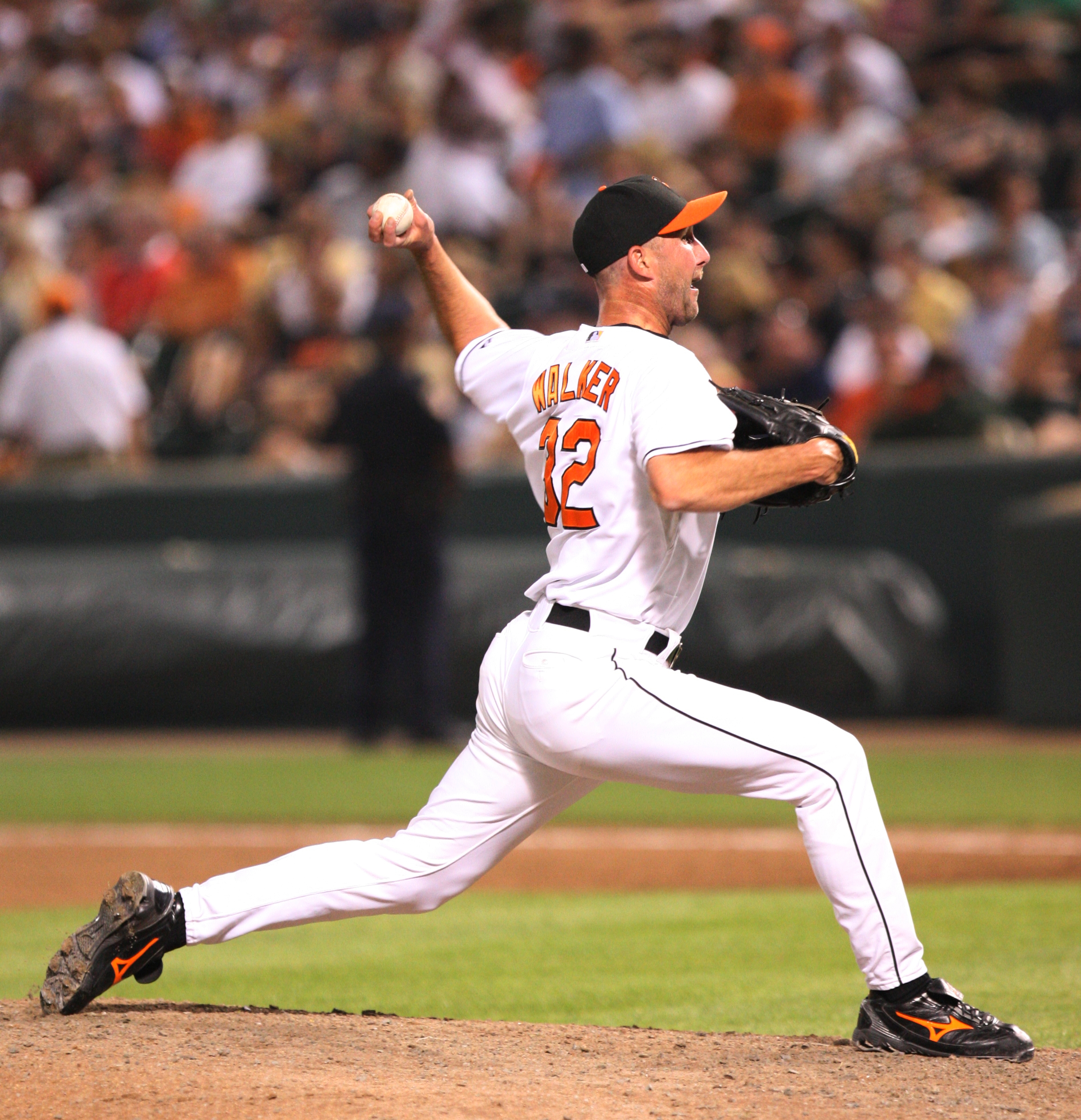
- Walker with the Baltimore Orioles
- Pitcher
- Born: July 1, 1971 (age 55); McMinnville, Tennessee, U.S.
- Batted: Left Threw: Left

MLB debut
- April 2, 1997, for the Kansas City Royals

Last MLB appearance
- June 2, 2009, for the Baltimore Orioles

MLB statistics
- Win–loss record: 19–21
- Earned run average: 4.13
- Strikeouts: 318
- Stats at Baseball Reference

Teams
- Kansas City Royals (1997–1998); Detroit Tigers (2002–2006); Baltimore Orioles (2007–2009)

James Ross Walker (born July 1, 1971) is an American former professional baseball relief pitcher. He pitched in Major League Baseball (MLB) for the Kansas City Royals, Detroit Tigers, and Baltimore Orioles.

== Biography ==
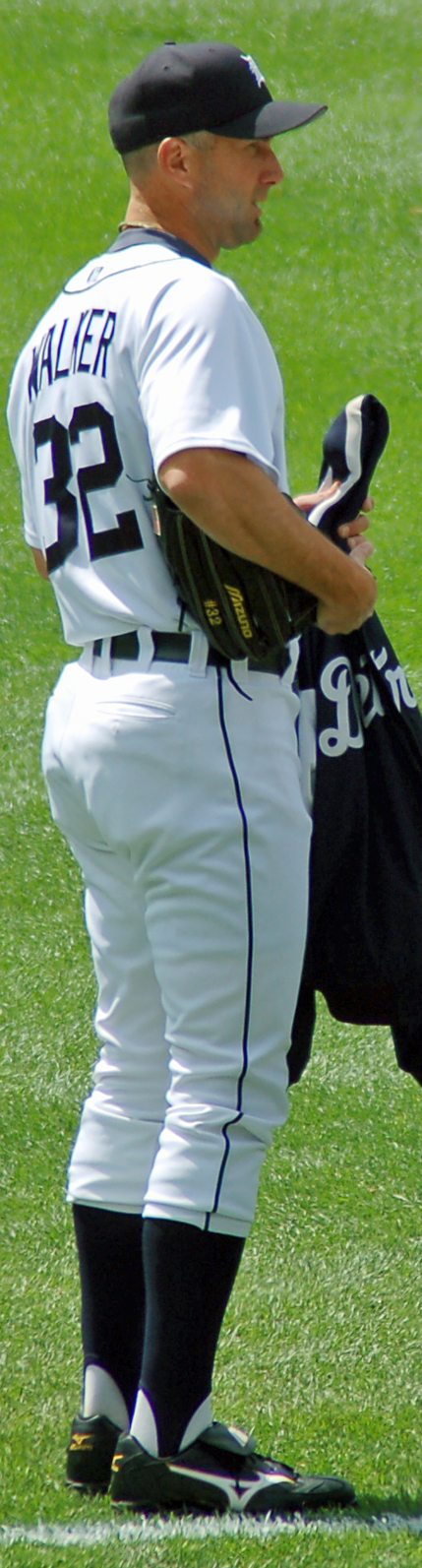
Walker with the Detroit Tigers in 2006.

Walker graduated from Warren County Senior High in McMinnville, Tennessee in 1989. He attended Austin Peay State University between 1990 and 1992 and ranks fifth all-time in school history with 17 wins and first with three career shutouts. Walker was drafted in the 10th round (265th overall) of the 1992 MLB draft by the Houston Astros.

Walker crossed the picket lines and participated in spring training during the 1994 Major League Baseball strike as a replacement player. As a result, he was barred membership to the Major League Baseball Players Association. This prevented Walker from being listed among Tigers players on their 2006 ALCS championship merchandise. Walker has been clear and candid about his role as a replacement player with his major league teammates.

In 2006, Walker nearly broke the major league record for most appearances in a season without a decision (no wins or losses). The record was held by Scott Aldred (a former Tiger, coincidentally), who made 48 appearances for the 1998 Tampa Bay Devil Rays while accomplishing this feat. By September 29 (with three games left in the season), he had pitched in 54 games without being credited with a win or a loss. However, he would surrender four runs on three home runs against his former team (the Kansas City Royals) in the top of the 11th inning and was charged with a loss. However, Aldred's record would only hold for one more season, as Trever Miller of the Houston Astros set the new mark by making 76 appearances without a decision in 2007.

== Honors and awards ==
Walker was named Ohio Valley Conference Pitcher of the Year in 1992. He was inducted into the Austin Peay State University Athletics Hall of Fame on February 8, 2003, and into the Warren County, Tennessee Sports Hall of Fame on December 19, 2006.

== Personal life ==
Walker is married (wife Natalie) and has three sons (Ross, born 1995, James Leyland, born 2007, and Isaac, born 2009). Although the name is the same, he is not named after Walker's former manager in Detroit. He also has two daughters (Harlee, born 1999; Hannah, born 2004). The family resides on their property in Overland Park, Kansas. They have a second home in Smith Center.

== See also ==
- LOOGY
