= John-Ford Griffin =

American baseball player (born 1979)

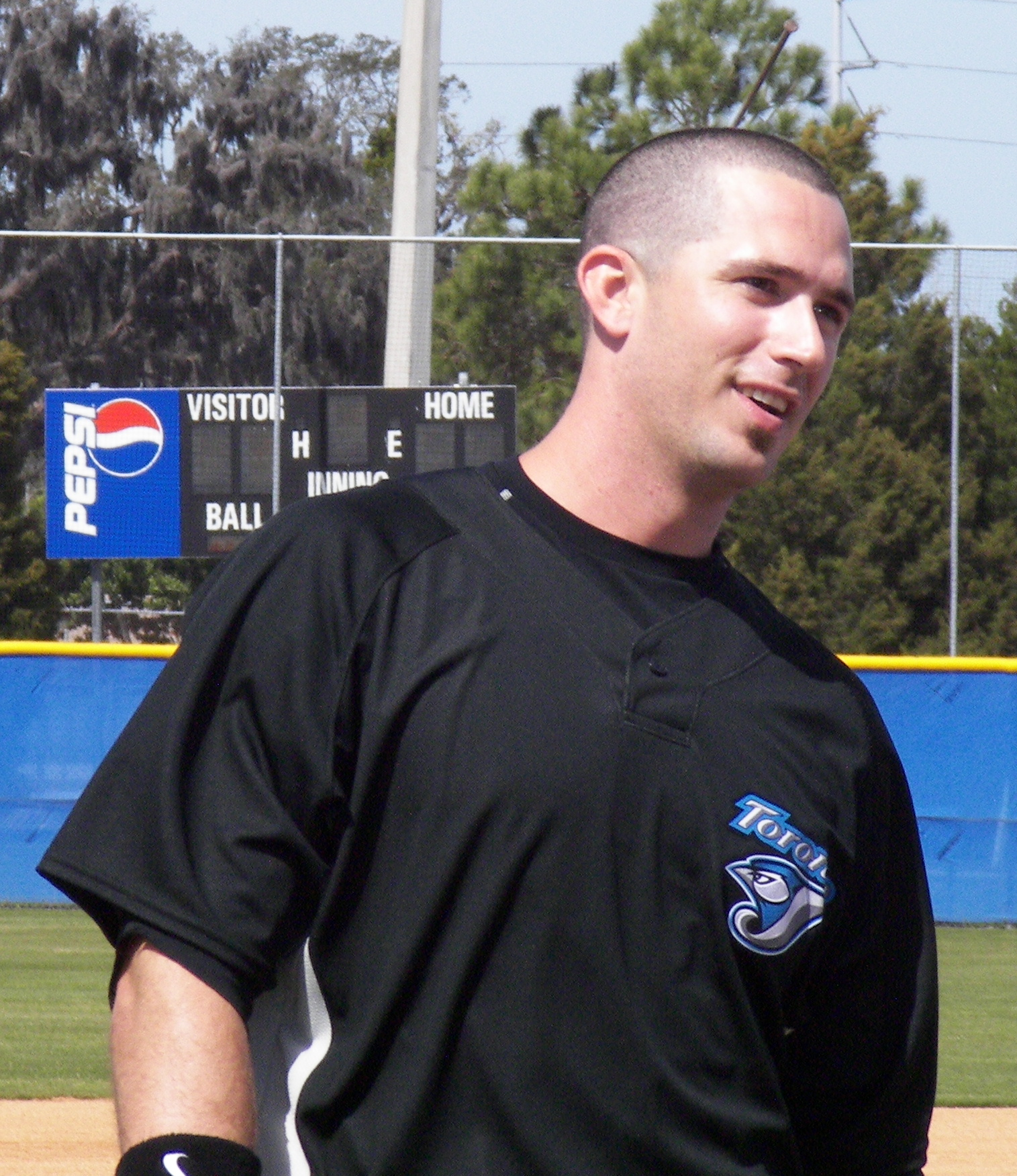
- Outfielder
- Born: November 19, 1979 (age 45); Sarasota, Florida, U.S.
- Batted: Left Threw: Left

MLB debut
- September 6, 2005, for the Toronto Blue Jays

Last MLB appearance
- September 30, 2007, for the Toronto Blue Jays

MLB statistics
- Batting average: .304
- Home runs: 2
- Runs batted in: 9
- Stats at Baseball Reference

Teams
- Toronto Blue Jays (2005, 2007)

John-Ford David Griffin (born November 19, 1979) is an American former professional baseball outfielder. He played in Major League Baseball (MLB) for the Toronto Blue Jays.

== Early life ==
An All-State athlete at Sarasota High School, was part of a state championship team in 1996 for the Sailors. Griffin played college baseball under head coach Mike Martin for the Florida State University Seminoles from 1999 to 2001. Griffin's career batting average was .427, a Florida State record at the time.

== Professional career ==
Griffin was drafted out of Florida State University by the New York Yankees with the 23rd overall pick in the 2001 First-Year Player Draft. On July 5, 2002, Griffin, and future Blue Jays teammates Ted Lilly and Jason Arnold were traded to the Oakland Athletics as part of a three-team deal also involving the Detroit Tigers that sent Jeff Weaver to the Yankees. On January 7, 2003, Griffin was traded to the Blue Jays for a player to be named later. Minor league outfielder Jason Perry was later sent to Oakland to complete the deal.

Griffin posted decent numbers in his 2004 campaign with the Double-A New Hampshire Fisher Cats, hitting .248 with 22 home runs and 81 runs batted in. His 2005 season with the Syracuse SkyChiefs was even better, as he led the International League with 30 home runs and 103 RBIs on the way to earning both an International League All-Star selection and the Team MVP award from Syracuse.

Griffin made his major league debut and collected his first major-league hit, a double, on September 6, 2005, in a game against the Baltimore Orioles. On the final day of the regular season, he hit his first Major League home run against Kansas City Royals pitcher Jimmy Gobble. During his major league stint in 2005, Griffin hit .308 with one home run and six RBIs.

In 2006, Griffin's numbers declined due to injuries, as he hit .225 with six home runs in 60 games for Syracuse.

In 2007, Griffin rebounded in Syracuse, hitting .252/.330/.488 with 26 home runs and struck out 144 times. He hit well on a September call-up to Toronto and is now a career .304/.370/.696 hitter in 27 major league plate appearances. He has hit two major league home runs. Griffin was released at the end of the season.

In 2008, Griffin played for the Las Vegas 51s in the Dodgers farm system. He re-signed with the Dodgers in February 2009 and played briefly for the AAA Albuquerque Isotopes before he was released by the Dodgers on May 25 and signed a new minor league contract with the Chicago Cubs.

In 2010, Griffin played for the Newark Bears of the Atlantic League of Professional Baseball, but announced his retirement on June 18, 2010.

In 2011, he co-founded Powermill Training Academy in Tallahassee, Florida. In 2012, Griffin was inducted into the FSU Hall of Fame. He joined the staff at IMG Academy in 2015, serving as hitting coordinator.
