= Nate Cornejo =

American baseball player (born 1979)

- Pitcher
- Born: September 24, 1979 (age 46); Wellington, Kansas, U.S.
- Batted: Right Threw: Right

MLB debut
- August 8, 2001, for the Detroit Tigers

Last MLB appearance
- May 2, 2004, for the Detroit Tigers

MLB statistics
- Win–loss record: 12–29
- Earned run average: 5.41
- Strikeouts: 103
- Stats at Baseball Reference

Teams
- Detroit Tigers (2001–2004)

Nathan John Cornejo (born September 24, 1979) is an American former professional baseball pitcher, who played in Major League Baseball (MLB) from 2001 to 2004 for the Detroit Tigers.

== Early life ==
Cornejo was born in Wellington, Kansas. His father, Mardie Cornejo, appeared in 25 games in 1978 as a reliever for the New York Mets. The younger Cornejo attended Wellington High School.

== Playing career ==
Nate Cornejo was drafted in the first round of the 1998 MLB draft by the Detroit Tigers. He was the 34th player selected in the draft. Following the draft, he made his professional debut as a member of the Gulf Coast League Tigers. Cornejo recorded a 1–0 record in 5 appearances, posting a 1.26 earned run average over 14.1 innings.

For the 1999 season, Cornejo was promoted to the Single–A West Michigan Whitecaps of the Midwest League. He made 28 starts, posting a 9–11 record and a 3.71 ERA. In 174.2 innings, Cornejo struck out 125 batters and walked 67.

Cornejo split the 2000 season between the Single–A Lakeland Tigers of the Florida State League and the Double–A Jacksonville Suns of the Southern League. In 12 starts for Lakeland, he compiled a 5–5 record and a 3.04 ERA, with 60 strikeouts and 31 walks over 77 innings. Cornejo started 16 games for Jacksonville, posting a 5–7 record and an earned run average of 4.61. In 91.2 innings for Jacksonville, he recorded 60 strikeouts and 43 walks.

He was selected to play in the 2001 All-Star Futures Game. In a preview of that game, the Seattle Post-Intelligencer compared him to future All-Star Matt Clement.

In 2002, Baseball America listed Cornejo as one of the top 100 prospects in baseball.

In his lone full season with Detroit in 2003, Cornejo finished the season with a 6–17 record. He had the lowest strikeout rate of any starting pitcher in over 20 years, striking out just 46 batters in 194.2 innings.

Cornejo played for the Detroit Tigers until 2004 and was released to free agency in 2005. He was signed by the Chicago White Sox to a minor league contract in April 2006. Cornejo pitched four games in the minors before officially retiring on July 2, 2006.

== See also ==
- List of second-generation Major League Baseball players
