= Mike Maroth =

American baseball player & coach (born 1977)

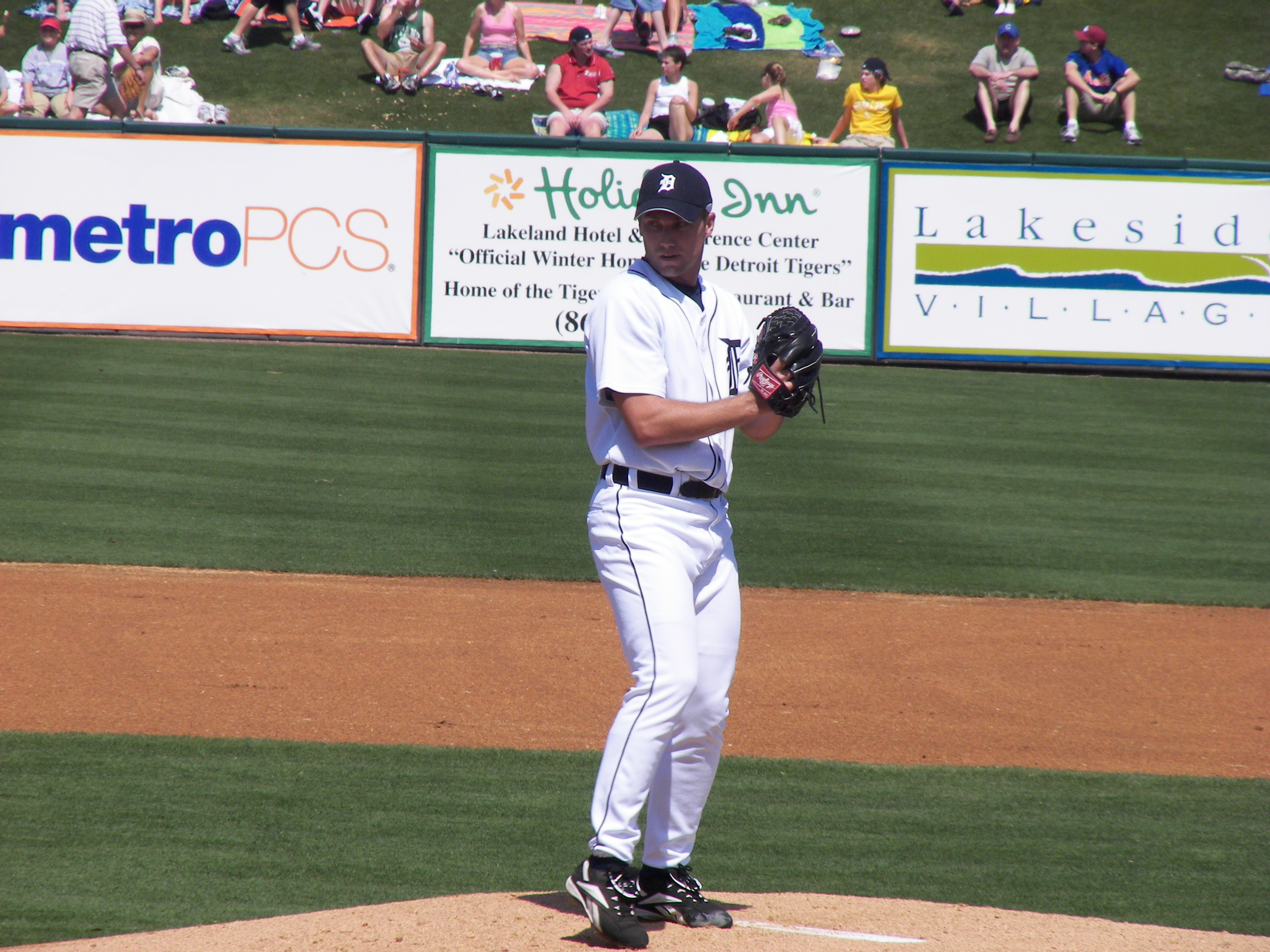
- Maroth with the Detroit Tigers
- Pitcher
- Born: August 17, 1977 (age 48); Orlando, Florida, U.S.
- Batted: Left Threw: Left

MLB debut
- June 8, 2002, for the Detroit Tigers

Last MLB appearance
- September 24, 2007, for the St. Louis Cardinals

MLB statistics
- Win–loss record: 50–67
- Earned run average: 5.05
- Strikeouts: 443
- Stats at Baseball Reference

Teams
- Detroit Tigers (2002–2007); St. Louis Cardinals (2007)

Michael Warren Maroth (born August 17, 1977) is an American former Major League Baseball (MLB) starting pitcher and former professional and college pitching coach . Born in Orlando, Florida, the left-handed Maroth attended the University of Central Florida and made his Major League debut in 2002 for the Detroit Tigers. He lost 21 games in 2003, the only MLB pitcher to lose 20 games since 1980.

== Playing career ==
=== Boston Red Sox ===
A third-round pick in the 1998 draft, Maroth spent his first two years of professional baseball playing for the Single-A Sarasota Red Sox in the Boston Red Sox organization. He led Sarasota's starting pitchers with 11 wins in 1999.

=== Detroit Tigers ===
Before the 2000 season, Maroth was traded to the Tigers organization for relief pitcher Bryce Florie and worked his way up from the Single-A Lakeland Tigers to the Triple-A Toledo Mud Hens by 2001. Maroth had a 4.65 earned run average (ERA) with Toledo. At the time of his promotion to the Tigers, he was also tied for second place in wins for the entire International League. Maroth was made a starter for the Tigers on June 8, 2002.

In 2003, Maroth lost 21 games for the Tigers—the first pitcher to lose 20 or more games in a season since Brian Kingman lost 20 for the Oakland Athletics in 1980. He remains the most recent pitcher to lose 20 or more games in a season as of 2025. However, he led the Tigers in wins (9) and win–loss percentage (.300) while the team set the American League record of 119 games lost (43–119).

Maroth rebounded to a decent 2004 campaign, going 11–13 with a 4.31 ERA and 108 strikeouts. 2004 also saw Maroth pitch a one-hit complete game shutout against a surging New York Yankees team that July – he lost his no-hit bid in the fourth-inning due to future teammate Gary Sheffield. In light of the Tigers' continually struggling offense, Maroth's 2005 performance was similarly solid; he managed to rack up 14 wins in 28 starts, the second best record on the team and just one loss behind their young ace, Jeremy Bonderman.

In 2006, Maroth assumed the No. 3 role in the starter rotation, behind the veteran Kenny Rogers and Bonderman, and ahead of rookie Justin Verlander and Nate Robertson. After a start against the Kansas City Royals on May 25, Maroth was placed on the disabled list in early June with bone chips in his left elbow. Late in the 2006 season, Maroth made four relief appearances, posting a 9.53 ERA over 5 2/3 innings of work, giving up three home runs. Maroth was left off the postseason roster.

He returned to the starting rotation in the 2007 season. He missed only one start due to illness. With Kenny Rogers on the DL, the rotation consisted of Maroth, Jeremy Bonderman, Justin Verlander, Chad Durbin, and Nate Robertson.

=== St. Louis Cardinals ===
Maroth was traded to the St. Louis Cardinals for a player to be named later. Minor league pitcher Chris Lambert, a former first-round pick for the Cardinals in 2004, was sent to the Tigers on August 31, 2007, to complete the deal. In his first career National League start on June 25 against the New York Mets, Maroth surrendered just one run and two hits in 7 1/3 innings, but did not figure in the decision. However, Maroth was unable to succeed in any role with St. Louis during the rest of the year, going 0–4 with an ERA above 10. He was given his release from the team on October 25, 2007.

=== Later career ===
On February 8, 2008, the Kansas City Royals signed Maroth to a minor league contract and invited him to spring training. Maroth was released on May 2, 2008.

Maroth underwent shoulder surgery in May 2008, expecting to be able to pitch by spring training 2009.

On December 30, 2008, Maroth signed a minor league deal with the Toronto Blue Jays. Maroth pitched two innings of spring training game on March 3, 2009, the first time he had thrown in a Major League game since 2007. Maroth commented "My arm felt great... Probably felt too great. It’s been a while since I've been able to get out there. Got that adrenaline." After not making the team out of camp, Maroth was released.

On January 8, 2010, Maroth signed a minor league contract with the Minnesota Twins with an invite to spring training. Maroth did not make the team out of spring training and was sent down to the Triple-A Rochester Red Wings. In late May, Maroth had surgery to remove a bone spur from his elbow causing him to be out four to five weeks.

Maroth retired on January 25, 2011.

== Coaching career ==
In September 2011, Maroth was named the pitching coach for the Class A-Advanced Lakeland Flying Tigers. In October 2014, after three seasons with Lakeland, it was announced Maroth was named the pitching coach for the Triple-A Toledo Mud Hens.

In September 2015, the Atlanta Braves hired Maroth as their minor league rehab pitching coordinator.

Maroth was named as the pitching coach for the Class A-Advanced Florida Fire Frogs in the Atlanta Braves organization for the 2018 season. He was named as the pitching coach for the Braves' Triple-A Gwinnett Stripers for the 2019 season.

Maroth was named as the pitching coach for his alma mater, the UCF Knights, for the 2023 season. He did not return to UCF in 2024, following the firing of head coach Greg Lovelady.

== Scouting report ==
Maroth was not an overpowering pitcher, averaging under 85 miles per hour (MPH) on his fastball. He also threw an 82 MPH cutter. His offspeed pitches were a slider, curveball, and changeup.
