= 2003 Toronto Blue Jays season =

2003 Toronto Blue Jays
- League: American League
- Division: East
- Ballpark: SkyDome
- City: Toronto
- Record: 86–76 (.531)
- Divisional place: 3rd
- Owners: Rogers; Paul Godfrey (CEO)
- General managers: J. P. Ricciardi
- Managers: Carlos Tosca
- Television: The Sports Network (Pat Tabler, Rod Black); Rogers Sportsnet (Rob Faulds, Tom Candiotti, John Cerutti)
- Radio: CJCL (AM) (Jerry Howarth, Tom Cheek)

The 2003 Toronto Blue Jays season was the franchise's 27th season of Major League Baseball. It resulted in the Blue Jays finishing third in the American League East with a record of 86 wins and 76 losses. It was the team's final season with Diamond as one of the mascots, as she was removed at the end of the season, leaving Ace as the sole mascot of the Blue Jays.

== Transactions ==
Transactions by the Toronto Blue Jays during the off-season before the 2003 season.

=== October 2002 ===
October 9	Released Chris Carpenter. Brandon Lyon selected off of waivers by the Boston Red Sox.
October 15	Joe Lawrence granted free agency (signed with Milwaukee Brewers to a contract on December 11, 2002). Brian Lesher granted free agency (signed with Tampa Bay Devil Rays to a contract on December 18, 2002). Chad Mottola granted free agency (signed with Tampa Bay Devil Rays to a contract on November 1, 2002). Luke Prokopec granted free agency (signed with Los Angeles Dodgers to a one-year, $390,000 contract on November 4, 2002). Pedro Swann granted free agency (signed with Baltimore Orioles to a one-year contract on February 3, 2003). Scott Winchester granted free agency (signed with Los Angeles Dodgers to a one-year contract on January 29, 2003).
October 23	Signed free agent Doug Linton from the Atlanta Braves to a one-year, $350,000 contract.
October 28	Félix Heredia granted free agency (signed with Cincinnati Reds to a one-year, $600,000 contract on January 7, 2003). Steve Parris granted free agency (signed with Tampa Bay Devil Rays to a one-year, $400,000 contract.
October 29	Signed free agent Doug Creek from the Seattle Mariners to a one-year, $700,000 contract. Esteban Loaiza granted free agency (signed with Chicago White Sox to a one-year, $500,000 contract on January 24, 2003).

=== November 2002 ===
November 1	Signed free agent Jeff Tam from the Oakland Athletics to a one-year, $600,000 contract.
November 12	Signed free agent Howie Clark from the Baltimore Orioles to a contract.
November 13	Signed free agent Trever Miller from the Cincinnati Reds to a one-year, $305,000 contract.
November 16	Acquired Cory Lidle from the Oakland Athletics for Mike Rouse and Chris Mowday.
November 17	Signed free agent Mike Moriarty from the Baltimore Orioles to a contract.
November 18	Signed free agent Rob Ryan from the Boston Red Sox to a contract.
November 19	Signed free agent Tim Young from the Cleveland Indians to a contract.
November 24	Signed free agent Josh Towers from the Baltimore Orioles to a contract.

=== December 2002 ===
December 5	Signed free agent Bruce Aven from the Philadelphia Phillies to a one-year contract.
December 15	As part of four-team trade: traded Felipe López to the Cincinnati Reds. Received a player to be named later from the Oakland Athletics (Jason Arnold on December 16, 2002). In addition, Arizona Diamondbacks sent Erubiel Durazo to the Oakland Athletics; and the Cincinnati Reds sent Elmer Dessens and cash to the Arizona Diamondbacks. Re-signed Dave Berg to a two-year, $1.5 million contract.
December 16	Drafted Jason Dubois from the Chicago Cubs in the 2002 MLB Rule 5 draft. Matt Ford drafted by the Milwaukee Brewers in the 2002 MLB Rule 5 draft. Drafted Aquilino López from the Seattle Mariners in the 2002 MLB Rule 5 draft. Frank Gracesqui selected by the Florida Marlins in the 2002 Minor League Draft. Drafted Gary Majewski from the Chicago White Sox in the 2002 Minor League Draft. Signed free agent Greg Myers from the Oakland Athletics to a one-year, $800,000 contract.
December 20	Signed free agent Mike Bordick from the Baltimore Orioles to a one-year, $1 million contract.
December 21	José Cruz Jr. granted free agency (signed with San Francisco Giants to a one-year, $2.5 million contract on January 28, 2003). Signed free agent Tanyon Sturtze from the Tampa Bay Devil Rays to a one-year, $1 million contract.
December 23	Signed free agent Mike Colangelo from the Oakland Athletics to a one-year contract.
December 28	Signed free agent Frank Catalanotto from the Texas Rangers to a one-year, $2.2 million contract.

=== January 2003 ===
January 15	Re-signed Chris Woodward to a one-year, $775,000 contract.
January 17	Re-signed Cliff Politte to a one-year, $845,000 contract. Re-signed Roy Halladay to a one-year, $3.8 million contract.
January 27	Acquired John-Ford Griffin from the Oakland Athletics for a player to be named later (Jason Perry on June 23, 2003).
January 31	Re-signed Kelvim Escobar to a one-year, $3.9 million contract.

=== February 2003 ===
February 18	Re-signed Shannon Stewart to a one-year, $6.2 million contract.

=== March 2003 ===
March 11	Released Pasqual Coco.
March 15	Returned Jason Dubois to the Chicago Cubs.
March 17	Returned Gary Majewski to the Chicago White Sox. Re-signed Eric Hinske to a five-year, $14.75 million contract. Re-signed Vernon Wells to a five-year, $14.7 million contract.
March 27	Signed free agent Dan Reichert from the Tampa Bay Devil Rays to a one-year contract.
March 28	Selected Kevin Frederick from the Minnesota Twins off of waivers.

== Regular season ==
=== Summary ===
The 2003 season was a surprise to both team management and baseball analysts. After a poor April, the team had its most successful month ever in May. The offense was mainly responsible for the stunning turnaround. Delgado took over the major league lead in runs batted in, followed closely by Wells. The middle infield positions remained a gametime decision – Bordick played shortstop and third base, Dave Berg second base and third base, Chris Woodward shortstop and Orlando Hudson second base. Minor league call-up Howie Clark entered the mix as a utility player after Hinske underwent surgery to repair a broken hamate bone in his right hand, which he had tried to play through for the first six weeks.

Despite their hitting successes, poor pitching continued to plague the team. Roy Halladay was spectacular in winning his first Cy Young Award, going 22–7, with a 3.25 ERA, but he didn't get much help from his fellow pitchers, although he had a poor start himself. Rookie Aquilino López was a pleasant surprise out of the bullpen. Kelvim Escobar and former NBA player Mark Hendrickson were inserted into the rotation with their places in the bullpen filled by waiver acquisitions Doug Davis and Josh Towers, who went 8–1 after being called up from Triple-A Syracuse. The closer role was a season-long revolving door, with nobody able to take hold of the reins. Trade speculation had focussed on the acquisitions of pitching at the expense of hitters, but in the end the team simply divested itself of impending free agent Shannon Stewart without getting a pitcher in return. Instead Bobby Kielty, another outfielder with a much lower batting average than Stewart's, was obtained from the Minnesota Twins and later traded in November 2003 to the Oakland Athletics for starter Ted Lilly. The top four pitchers for the projected 2004 rotation would include Halladay, Lilly, free agent Miguel Batista, and the return of Pat Hentgen.

After the spectacular turnaround in May 2003, which helped the team move to just few games behind the wildcard leading Boston Red Sox, team performance slowly returned to reality, as predicted by team management. Carlos Delgado was second in the voting for the American League MVP Award, although the Jays were in third place in their division. The Jays also announced that a new logo, and new uniforms, would be used as of January 1, 2004.

=== Opening Day starters ===
- Frank Catalanotto
- Carlos Delgado
- Roy Halladay
- Eric Hinske
- Ken Huckaby
- Orlando Hudson
- Josh Phelps
- Shannon Stewart
- Vernon Wells
- Chris Woodward

=== Season standings ===
AL East
Team	W	L	Pct.	GB	Home	Road
New York Yankees	101	61	.623	—	50‍–‍32	51‍–‍29
Boston Red Sox	95	67	.586	6	53‍–‍28	42‍–‍39
Toronto Blue Jays	86	76	.531	15	41‍–‍40	45‍–‍36
Baltimore Orioles	71	91	.438	30	40‍–‍40	31‍–‍51
Tampa Bay Devil Rays	63	99	.389	38	36‍–‍45	27‍–‍54

=== Record vs. opponents ===
2003 American League record Source: MLB Standings Grid – 2003
Team	ANA	BAL	BOS	CWS	CLE	DET	KC	MIN	NYY	OAK	SEA	TB	TEX	TOR	NL
Anaheim	—	1–8	3–6	3–4	6–3	6–1	6–3	5–4	3–6	8–12	8–11	6–3	9–10	2–7	11–7
Baltimore	8–1	—	9–10	2–4	3–3	3–3	3–4	3–4	6–13–1	2–7	4–5	8–11	7–2	8–11	5–13
Boston	6–3	10–9	—	5–4	4–2	8–1	5–1	2–4	9–10	3–4	5–2	12–7	5–4	10–9	11–7
Chicago	4–3	4–2	4–5	—	11–8	11–8	11–8	9–10	4–2	4–5	2–7	3–3	3–4	6–3	10–8
Cleveland	3–6	3–3	2–4	8–11	—	12–7	6–13	9–10	2–5	3–6	3–6	5–2	4–5	2–4	6–12
Detroit	1–6	3–3	1–8	8–11	7–12	—	5–14	4–15	1–5	3–6	1–8	2–4	1–6	2–7	4–14
Kansas City	3–6	4–3	1–5	8–11	13–6	14–5	—	11–8	2–4	2–7	4–5	4–3	7–2	1–5	9–9
Minnesota	4–5	4–3	4–2	10–9	10–9	15–4	8–11	—	0–7	8–1	3–6	6–0	5–4	3–3	10–8
New York	6–3	13–6–1	10–9	2–4	5–2	5–1	4–2	7–0	—	3–6	5–4	14–5	4–5	10–9	13–5
Oakland	12–8	7–2	4–3	5–4	6–3	6–3	7–2	1–8	6–3	—	7–12	6–3	15–4	5–2	9–9
Seattle	11–8	5–4	2–5	7–2	6–3	8–1	5–4	6–3	4–5	12–7	—	4–5	10–10	3–4	10–8
Tampa Bay	3–6	11–8	7–12	3–3	2–5	4–2	3–4	0–6	5–14	3–6	5–4	—	3–6	11–8	3–15
Texas	10–9	2–7	4–5	4–3	5–4	6–1	2–7	4–5	5–4	4–15	10–10	6–3	—	5–4	4–14
Toronto	7–2	11–8	9–10	3–6	4–2	7–2	5–1	3–3	9–10	2–5	4–3	8–11	4–5	—	10–8

=== Transactions ===
Transactions for the Toronto Blue Jays during the 2003 regular season.

==== April 2003 ====
April 30	Doug Davis selected off of waivers from the Texas Rangers.

==== June 2003 ====
June 12	Released Tim Young.
June 16	Selected Scott Service off of waivers from the Arizona Diamondbacks.
June 17	Signed free agent Juan Acevedo from the New York Yankees to a contract.
June 19	Released Rob Ryan.
June 20	Released Mike Moriarty.

==== July 2003 ====
July 8	Acquired John Wasdin from the Pittsburgh Pirates for Rich Thompson.
July 11	Doug Davis granted free agency (signed with Milwaukee Brewers to a contract on July 14, 2003).
July 16	Acquired Bobby Kielty from the Minnesota Twins for Shannon Stewart and a player to be named later (Dave Gassner on December 15, 2003).
July 30	Signed amateur free agent Luis Pérez to a contract.

==== August 2003 ====
August 7	Signed free agent Anthony Sanders from the Chicago White Sox to a one-year contract.
August 9	Released Juan Acevedo.
August 10	Released Scott Service.

==== September 2003 ====
September 5	Released Jeff Tam.

=== 2003 draft picks ===
The 2003 MLB draft was held on June 3–4.

Round	Pick	Player	Position	College/School	Nationality	Signed
1	13	Aaron Hill	SS	Louisiana State	(United States)	2003–06–17
2	50	Josh Banks	RHP	Florida International	(United States)	2003–06–04
3	80	Shaun Marcum	RHP	Missouri State	(United States)	2003–06–23
4	110	Kurt Isenberg	LHP	James Madison	(United States)	–
5	140	Justin James	RHP	Missouri	(United States)	–
6	170	Christian Snavely	OF	Ohio State	(United States)	–
7	200	Danny Core	RHP	Florida Atlantic	(United States)	–
8	230	Chad Mulholland	RHP	Missouri State	(United States)	–
9	260	Jamie Vermilyea	RHP	New Mexico	(United States)	2003–06–05
11	320	Tom Mastny	RHP	Furman University	(Indonesia)	
18	530	Ryan Roberts	3B	Texas	(United States)	2003–06–05

=== Roster ===
2003 Toronto Blue Jays
Roster
Pitchers: 57 Juan Acevedo; 26 Brian Bowles; 50 Vinnie Chulk; 39 Doug Creek; 48 Doug Davis; 45 Kelvim Escobar; 32 Roy Halladay; 43 Mark Hendrickson; 46 Jason Kershner; 21 Cory Lidle; 30 Doug Linton; 44 Aquilino López; 51 Trever Miller; 19 Cliff Politte; 54 Dan Reichert; 53 Scott Service; 31 Tanyon Sturtze; 33 Jeff Tam; 35 Corey Thurman; 7 Josh Towers; 41 Pete Walker; 38 John Wasdin	Catchers: 29 Kevin Cash; 20 Ken Huckaby; 28 Greg Myers; 9 Tom Wilson; Infielders: 2 Dave Berg; 16 Mike Bordick; 6 Howie Clark; 25 Carlos Delgado; 11 Eric Hinske; 3 Orlando Hudson; 17 Josh Phelps; 5 Chris Woodward	Outfielders: 27 Frank Catalanotto; 37 Reed Johnson; 24 Bobby Kielty; 24 Shannon Stewart; 10 Vernon Wells; 54 Jayson Werth	Manager: 14 Carlos Tosca; Coaches: 56 Mike Barnett (hitting); 55 Brian Butterfield (third base); 58 John Gibbons (first base); 47 Gil Patterson (pitching); 52 Bruce Walton (bullpen)

=== Game log ===
2003 Game Log
March: 0–1 (Home: 0–1; Away: 0–0)

#	Date	Opponent	Score	Win	Loss	Save	Attendance	Record
1	March 31	Yankees	8–4	Clemens (1–0)	Halladay (0–1)		50,119	0–1

April: 10–17 (Home: 4–9; Away: 6–8)

#	Date	Opponent	Score	Win	Loss	Save	Attendance	Record
2	April 1	Yankees	10–1	Pettitte (1–0)	Lidle (0–1)		15,176	0–2
3	April 2	Yankees	9–7	Mussina (1–0)	Hendrickson (0–1)	Acevedo (1)	16,222	0–3
4	April 4	@ Twins	7–2	Sturtze (1–0)	Reed (0–1)		48,617	1–3
5	April 5	@ Twins	4–3 (11)	Walker (1–0)	Guardado (0–1)	Escobar (1)	31,421	2–3
6	April 6	@ Twins	8–1	Lidle (1–1)	Radke (1–1)		23,549	3–3
7	April 8	Red Sox	8–4	Hendrickson (1–1)	Lowe (1–1)		13,147	4–3
8	April 9	Red Sox	10–5	Sturtze (2–0)	Fossum (1–1)		13,099	5–3
9	April 10	Red Sox	8–7	Timlin (1–0)	Politte (0–1)		13,779	5–4
10	April 11	Twins	6–4	Rogers (1–0)	Lidle (1–2)	Guardado (3)	13,237	5–5
11	April 12	Twins	9–6	Hawkins (1–0)	Escobar (0–1)	Guardado (4)	14,118	5–6
12	April 13	Twins	9–3	Mays (2–1)	Hendrickson (1–2)		13,333	5–7
13	April 14	@ Yankees	10–9	Contreras (1–0)	López (0–1)	Hammond (1)	30,761	5–8
14	April 15	@ Yankees	5–0	Mussina (3–0)	Halladay (0–2)		33,833	5–9
15	April 16	@ Yankees	7–6	Lidle (2–2)	Hitchcock (0–1)	Escobar (2)	25,831	6–9
16	April 17	@ Yankees	4–0	Weaver (1–0)	Walker (1–1)		32,057	6–10
17	April 18	@ Red Sox	7–3	Wakefield (2–0)	Tam (0–1)		31,440	6–11
18	April 19	@ Red Sox	7–2	Lowe (3–1)	Sturtze (2–1)		32,329	6–12
19	April 20	@ Red Sox	6–5	Timlin (3–0)	Politte (0–2)		29,579	6–13
20	April 21	@ Red Sox	11–6	Lidle (3–2)	Burkett (1–1)		34,370	7–13
21	April 22	@ Devil Rays	4–3	Kennedy (1–1)	Kershner (0–1)	Carter (2)	10,013	7–14
22	April 23	@ Devil Rays	4–3	Venafro (1–0)	Hendrickson (1–3)	Carter (3)	9,221	7–15
23	April 24	@ Devil Rays	5–3	Sturtze (3–1)	Sosa (1–2)	Escobar (3)	8,618	8–15
24	April 25	Royals	6–5	Escobar (1–1)	Carrasco (1–1)		16,417	9–15
25	April 26	Royals	9–6	Grimsley (1–1)	Tam (0–2)	MacDougal (10)	17,197	9–16
26	April 27	Royals	10–9	Politte (1–2)	MacDougal (1–1)		17,059	10–16
27	April 29	Rangers	16–11	Thomson (2–2)	Hendrickson (1–4)	Cordero (1)	48,097	10–17
28	April 30	Rangers	11–3	Drese (2–1)	Sturtze (3–2)		16,021	10–18

May: 21–8 (Home: 9–4; Away: 12–4)

#	Date	Opponent	Score	Win	Loss	Save	Attendance	Record
29	May 1	Rangers	7–6	Halladay (1–2)	Lewis (3–2)	Politte (1)	16,111	11–18
30	May 2	Angels	3–1	Lidle (4–2)	Lackey (1–3)		17,799	12–18
31	May 3	Angels	7–1	Davis (1–0)	Shields (1–1)		21,007	13–18
32	May 4	Angels	8–2	Hendrickson (2–4)	Ortiz (4–3)	Escobar (4)	21,513	14–18
33	May 6	@ Rangers	15–5	Halladay (2–2)	Lewis (3–3)		20,092	15–18
34	May 7	@ Rangers	5–4	Fultz (1–0)	Sturtze (3–3)	Urbina (10)	18,508	15–19
35	May 8	@ Rangers	8–6	Lidle (5–2)	Drese (2–2)	Politte (2)	20,177	16–19
36	May 9	@ Angels	6–1	Sele (1–0)	Davis (1–1)		42,820	16–20
37	May 10	@ Angels	7–4	Hendrickson (3–4)	Ortiz (4–4)		43,661	17–20
38	May 11	@ Angels	4–2	Halladay (3–2)	Washburn (3–4)	Politte (3)	32,129	18–20
39	May 13	Devil Rays	7–5	Kennedy (3–3)	Sturtze (3–4)	Carter (8)	14,007	18–21
40	May 14	Devil Rays	7–6	Lidle (6–2)	Brazelton (0–2)	Politte (4)	29,013	19–21
41	May 15	Devil Rays	9–5	Colomé (1–1)	Davis (1–2)		20,417	19–22
42	May 16	@ Royals	18–1	Hendrickson (4–4)	George (4–3)		24,167	20–22
43	May 17	@ Royals	7–4	Halladay (4–2)	Grimsley (1–3)	Politte (5)	25,032	21–22
44	May 18	@ Royals	4–3	Sturtze (4–4)	Snyder (0–1)	Politte (6)	15,462	22–22
45	May 19	@ White Sox	12–2	Lidle (7–2)	Wright (0–2)		19,628	23–22
46	May 20	@ White Sox	4–1	Colón (5–3)	Davis (1–3)		12,857	23–23
47	May 21	@ White Sox	6–5	Marte (2–0)	Politte (1–3)	Koch (5)	13,076	23–24
48	May 22	@ Yankees	8–3	Halladay (5–2)	Pettitte (4–5)		45,777	24–24
49	May 23	@ Yankees	6–2	Escobar (2–1)	Mussina (7–3)		34,134	25–24
50	May 24	@ Yankees	5–2	Lidle (8–2)	Wells (6–2)	Politte (7)	35,023	26–24
51	May 25	@ Yankees	5–3	Davis (2–3)	Weaver (3–3)	Politte (8)	40,940	27–24
52	May 26	White Sox	11–5	Towers (1–0)	Buehrle (2–8)	Tam (1)	19,009	28–24
53	May 27	White Sox	5–1	Halladay (6–2)	Colón (5–4)		19,365	29–24
54	May 28	White Sox	8–0	Garland (3–4)	Escobar (2–2)		36,806	29–25
55	May 29	White Sox	3–2	Loaiza (8–2)	Lidle (8–3)	Koch (6)	20,010	29–26
56	May 30	Red Sox	13–2	Davis (3–3)	Burkett (3–3)		21,381	30–26
57	May 31	Red Sox	10–7	Sturtze (5–4)	Fossum (4–4)	Politte (9)	28,809	31–26

June: 15–11 (Home: 9–5; Away: 6–6)

#	Date	Opponent	Score	Win	Loss	Save	Attendance	Record
58	June 1	Red Sox	11–8	Halladay (7–2)	White (0–1)		26,890	32–26
59	June 3	@ Cardinals	11–5	Morris (7–3)	Escobar (2–3)		28,907	32–27
60	June 4	@ Cardinals	8–5	Simontacchi (3–3)	Lidle (8–4)	Eldred (5)	28,840	32–28
61	June 5	@ Cardinals	13–5	Williams (8–1)	Hendrickson (4–5)		33,729	32–29
62	June 6	@ Reds	9–2	Halladay (8–2)	Riedling (0–3)		28,281	33–29
63	June 7	@ Reds	9–8	Reitsma (5–2)	Politte (1–4)		30,158	33–30
64	June 8	@ Reds	5–0	Escobar (3–3)	Haynes (0–5)		25,633	34–30
65	June 10	Pirates	13–8	Lidle (9–4)	Benson (5–7)		14,090	35–30
66	June 11	Pirates	8–5	Halladay (9–2)	D'Amico (4–7)		32,036	36–30
67	June 12	Pirates	5–4	Hendrickson (5–5)	Suppan (5–6)	Politte (10)	15,015	37–30
68	June 13	Cubs	5–1	Escobar (4–3)	Wood (5–5)		23,018	38–30
69	June 14	Cubs	4–2	Prior (8–2)	Davis (3–4)	Borowski (13)	33,167	38–31
70	June 15	Cubs	5–4 (10)	López (1–1)	Guthrie (0–3)		34,221	39–31
--	June 17	@ Orioles	Postponed (rain) Rescheduled for July 3					
71	June 18	@ Orioles	6–2	Halladay (10–2)	Daal (4–8)	López (1)	28,828	40–31
72	June 19	@ Orioles	6–1	Escobar (5–3)	Helling (4–5)		24,218	41–31
73	June 20	@ Expos	8–4	Lidle (10–4)	Vázquez (6–5)		11,355	42–31
74	June 21	@ Expos	8–5	Ayala (6–2)	Politte (1–5)	Biddle (19)	11,483	42–32
75	June 22	@ Expos	4–2	Halladay (11–2)	Hernández (6–6)	Politte (11)	15,508	43–32
76	June 23	Orioles	13–4	Davis (4–4)	Daal (4–9)		17,555	44–32
77	June 24	Orioles	6–4	Helling (5–5)	Escobar (5–4)	Julio (16)	17,425	44–33
78	June 25	Orioles	9–2	Ponson (10–4)	Lidle (10–5)		37,248	44–34
79	June 26	Orioles	13–8	Sturtze (6–4)	Driskill (1–3)	López (2)	19,098	45–34
80	June 27	Expos	6–5	Miller (1–0)	Manon (0–1)		24,024	46–34
81	June 28	Expos	4–2	Vargas (5–3)	Davis (4–5)	Biddle (22)	33,334	46–35
82	June 29	Expos	10–2	Ohka (7–7)	Escobar (5–5)		37,354	46–36
83	June 30	@ Tigers	6–2	Maroth (3–12)	Lidle (10–6)		13,353	46–37

July: 8–17 (Home: 3–11; Away: 5–6)

#	Date	Opponent	Score	Win	Loss	Save	Attendance	Record
84	July 1	@ Tigers	5–0	Roney (1–2)	Hendrickson (5–6)	Walker (1)	15,448	46–38
85	July 2	@ Tigers	8–2	Halladay (12–2)	Bernero (1–12)		16,052	47–38
86	July 3	@ Orioles	6–5	Johnson (7–3)	Davis (4–6)	Julio (17)	27,022	47–39
87	July 4	@ Orioles	8–5	Driskill (2–3)	López (1–2)	Julio (18)	25,641	47–40
88	July 5	@ Orioles	9–2	Ponson (11–5)	Lidle (10–7)		29,859	47–41
89	July 6	@ Orioles	5–3 (10)	Acevedo (1–3)	Ligtenberg (0–1)		30,284	48–41
90	July 8	Red Sox	2–1 (12)	Jones (1–0)	Tam (0–3)	Kim (2)	20,022	48–42
91	July 9	Red Sox	8–7	Lyon (4–5)	Tam (0–4)	Kim (3)	23,551	48–43
92	July 10	Red Sox	7–1	Mendoza (3–3)	Lidle (10–8)		20,113	48–44
93	July 11	Yankees	8–5	Pettitte (11–6)	Miller (1–1)	Rivera (16)	27,652	48–45
94	July 12	Yankees	10–3	Halladay (13–2)	Mussina (10–6)		37,119	49–45
95	July 13	Yankees	6–2	Weaver (5–7)	Escobar (5–6)		32,664	49–46
96	July 17	@ Red Sox	5–2	Halladay (14–2)	Lowe (10–4)		34,521	50–46
97	July 18	@ Red Sox	4–1	Escobar (6–6)	Wakefield (6–5)	Miller (1)	34,136	51–46
98	July 19	@ Red Sox	5–4 (10)	Kim (3–2)	López (1–3)		34,812	51–47
99	July 20	@ Red Sox	9–4	Martínez (7–2)	Wasdin (0–1)		34,321	51–48
100	July 21	@ Yankees	8–0 (8)	Hendrickson (6–6)	Weaver (5–8)		51,958	52–48
--	July 22	@ Yankees	Postponed (rain) Rescheduled for September 8					
101	July 23	White Sox	7–6	White (1–1)	Acevedo (1–4)	Marte (7)	20,320	52–49
102	July 24	White Sox	4–3 (13)	Gordon (5–5)	Sturtze (6–5)	White (1)	18,438	52–50
103	July 25	Orioles	5–3	Lidle (11–8)	Johnson (8–5)	Miller (2)	17,095	53–50
104	July 26	Orioles	7–2	Hentgen (3–5)	Hendrickson (6–7)		23,168	53–51
105	July 27	Orioles	10–1	Halladay (15–2)	López (3–6)		21,787	54–51
106	July 29	Devil Rays	9–8	Levine (3–5)	Miller (1–2)	Carter (17)	21,007	54–52
107	July 30	Devil Rays	5–3	Zambrano (8–5)	Lidle (11–9)	Colomé (2)	21,068	54–53
108	July 31	Devil Rays	7–6	Sosa (4–8)	Hendrickson (6–8)	Carter (18)	29,544	54–54

August: 13–15 (Home: 4–6; Away: 9–9)

#	Date	Opponent	Score	Win	Loss	Save	Attendance	Record
109	August 1	@ Angels	5–0	Ortiz (13–8)	Halladay (15–3)		42,635	54–55
110	August 2	@ Angels	6–1	Thurman (1–0)	Washburn (8–11)		43,087	55–55
111	August 3	@ Angels	4–0	Escobar (7–6)	Shields (2–2)	Politte (12)	42,198	56–55
112	August 4	@ Devil Rays	10–1	Zambrano (9–5)	Lidle (11–10)		8,193	56–56
113	August 5	@ Devil Rays	5–4 (10)	Colomé (3–5)	Acevedo (1–5)		9,566	56–57
114	August 6	@ Devil Rays	7–3	Halladay (16–3)	Kennedy (3–9)		9,430	57–57
115	August 8	Rangers	5–3	Dickey (6–5)	Thurman (1–1)	Cordero (7)	24,392	57–58
116	August 9	Rangers	5–3	Escobar (8–6)	Fultz (1–3)	López (3)	24,644	58–58
117	August 10	Rangers	5–4	Lewis (5–7)	Towers (1–1)	Cordero (8)	25,401	58–59
118	August 11	@ Mariners	5–3	Hendrickson (7–8)	Piñeiro (13–7)	López (4)	44,922	59–59
119	August 12	@ Mariners	3–1	García (10–12)	Halladay (16–4)	Hasegawa (11)	37,018	59–60
120	August 13	@ Mariners	13–6	Mateo (3–0)	Kershner (0–2)		37,066	59–61
121	August 14	@ Mariners	5–2	Escobar (9–6)	Meche (13–8)	López (5)	41,945	60–61
122	August 15	@ Athletics	8–5	Towers (2–1)	Harden (3–2)	Miller (3)	17,446	61–61
123	August 16	@ Athletics	6–4	Hudson (12–4)	Hendrickson (7–9)	Foulke (30)	31,045	61–62
124	August 17	@ Athletics	7–3	Zito (10–10)	Halladay (16–5)	Foulke (31)	32,488	61–63
125	August 19	Mariners	9–1	Franklin (9–10)	Escobar (9–7)		24,025	61–64
126	August 20	Mariners	5–2	Towers (3–1)	Meche (13–9)		21,588	62–64
127	August 21	Mariners	7–3	Hendrickson (8–9)	Moyer (15–6)		20,111	63–64
128	August 22	Athletics	6–3	Halladay (17–5)	Zito (10–11)	López (6)	22,050	64–64
129	August 23	Athletics	11–5	Wood (1–0)	Sturtze (6–6)		27,740	64–65
130	August 24	Athletics	17–2	Hudson (13–4)	Escobar (9–8)	Neu (1)	32,979	64–66
131	August 25	Athletics	8–6	Lilly (7–9)	Lidle (11–11)	Foulke (34)	22,111	64–67
132	August 26	@ Red Sox	12–9	Towers (4–1)	Sauerbeck (0–1)	López (7)	33,731	65–67
133	August 27	@ Red Sox	6–3	Timlin (6–4)	Halladay (17–6)	Kim (11)	34,206	65–68
134	August 29	@ Indians	7–3	Escobar (10–8)	Sabathia (12–8)		21,008	66–68
135	August 30	@ Indians	9–3	Lidle (12–11)	Westbrook (6–8)	Towers (1)	21,806	67–68
136	August 31	@ Indians	5–4	Báez (1–7)	Kershner (0–3)		20,866	67–69

September: 19–9 (Home: 12–4; Away: 7–5)

#	Date	Opponent	Score	Win	Loss	Save	Attendance	Record
137	September 1	Yankees	8–1	Halladay (18–6)	Wells (12–6)		26,869	68–69
138	September 3	Yankees	4–3	Kershner (1–3)	Osuna (2–5)	López (8)	21,770	69–69
139	September 4	Yankees	3–2	Contreras (5–2)	Walker (1–2)	Rivera (32)	17,254	69–70
140	September 5	Tigers	8–6	Sturtze (7–6)	Maroth (6–20)	López (9)	14,455	70–70
141	September 6	Tigers	1–0 (10)	Halladay (19–6)	Rodney (0–2)		18,261	71–70
142	September 7	Tigers	8–0	Towers (5–1)	Mears (0–2)		16,617	72–70
143	September 8	@ Yankees	9–3	Mussina (16–7)	Escobar (10–9)		8,848	72–71
144	September 9	@ Devil Rays	11–6	Waechter (3–0)	Lidle (12–12)	Kennedy (1)	8,528	72–72
145	September 10	@ Devil Rays	6–5	Hendrickson (9–9)	Sosa (5–10)	López (10)	8,522	73–72
146	September 11	@ Devil Rays	3–1	Halladay (20–6)	González (6–9)		9,345	74–72
147	September 12	Orioles	4–2	Towers (6–1)	DuBose (2–5)	López (11)	15,274	75–72
148	September 13	Orioles	6–1	Escobar (11–9)	Hentgen (6–8)		18,309	76–72
149	September 14	Orioles	5–3	Riley (1–0)	Lidle (12–13)	Julio (33)	18,763	76–73
150	September 16	@ Tigers	9–6	Kershner (2–3)	Cornejo (6–16)		9,801	77–73
151	September 17	@ Tigers	6–0	Halladay (21–6)	Loux (0–1)		11,240	78–73
152	September 18	@ Tigers	10–6	Towers (7–1)	Maroth (7–21)		9,951	79–73
153	September 19	@ Orioles	5–2	Escobar (12–9)	Carrasco (2–5)	López (12)	25,857	80–73
154	September 20	@ Orioles	2–1	Ligtenberg (3–2)	Lidle (12–14)	Julio (35)	32,381	80–74
155	September 21	@ Orioles	7–4	Walker (2–2)	Carrasco (2–6)	López (13)	27,502	81–74
156	September 22	Devil Rays	5–2	Bell (5–4)	Halladay (21–7)		22,869	81–75
157	September 23	Devil Rays	8–5	Kershner (3–3)	Zambrano (11–10)		17,208	82–75
158	September 24	Devil Rays	5–3	Escobar (13–9)	Waechter (3–2)	López (14)	16,050	83–75
159	September 25	Devil Rays	10–8	Miller (2–2)	Carter (7–5)		13,408	84–75
160	September 26	Indians	2–1	Stanford (1–3)	Lidle (12–15)	Riske (8)	13,861	84–76
161	September 27	Indians	5–4	Halladay (22–7)	Mulholland (3–4)		21,504	85–76
162	September 28	Indians	6–2	Towers (8–1)	Lee (3–3)		22,014	86–76

== Player stats ==
= Indicates team leader

=== Batting ===
Note: Pos = Position; G = Games played; AB = At bats; R = Runs; H = Hits; HR = Home runs; RBI = Runs batted in; Avg. = Batting average; SB = Stolen bases

Player	Pos	G	AB	R	H	HR	RBI	Avg.	SB
Greg Myers	C	121	329	51	101	15	52	.307	0
Carlos Delgado	1B	161	570	117	172	42	145	.302	0
Orlando Hudson	2B	142	474	54	127	9	57	.268	5
Chris Woodward	SS	104	349	49	91	7	45	.261	1
Eric Hinske	3B	124	449	74	109	12	63	.243	12
Shannon Stewart	LF	71	303	47	89	7	35	.294	1
Vernon Wells	CF	161	678	118	215	33	117	.317	4
Reed Johnson	RF	114	412	79	121	10	52	.294	5
Josh Phelps	DH	119	396	57	106	20	66	.260	1

==== Other batters ====
Note: G = Games played; AB = At bats; H = Hits; HR = Home runs; RBI = Runs batted in; Avg. = Batting average

Player	G	AB	H	HR	RBI	Avg.
Frank Catalanotto	133	489	146	13	59	.299
Mike Bordick	102	343	94	5	54	.274
Tom Wilson	96	256	66	5	35	.258
Bobby Kielty	62	189	44	4	25	.233
Dave Berg	61	161	41	4	18	.255
Kevin Cash	34	106	15	1	8	.142
Howie Clark	38	70	25	0	7	.357
Jayson Werth	26	48	10	2	10	.208
Ken Huckaby	5	11	2	0	2	.182

=== Pitching ===
==== Starting pitchers ====
Note: G = Games; IP = Innings pitched; W = Wins; L = Losses; ERA = Earned run average; SO = Strikeouts

Player	G	IP	W	L	ERA	SO
Roy Halladay	36	266	22	7	3.25	204
Cory Lidle	31	192 2/3	12	15	5.75	112
Mark Hendrickson	30	158 1/3	9	9	5.51	76
Pete Walker	23	55 1/3	2	2	4.88	29
Doug Davis	12	54	4	6	5.00	25

==== Other pitchers ====
Note: G = Games pitched; IP = Innings pitched; W = Wins; L = Losses; ERA = Earned run average; SO = Strikeouts

Player	G	IP	W	L	ERA	SO
Kelvim Escobar	41	180 1/3	13	9	4.29	159
Tanyon Sturtze	40	89 1/3	7	6	5.94	54
Josh Towers	14	64 1/3	8	1	4.48	42
Corey Thurman	6	15 1/3	1	1	6.46	11
John Wasdin	3	5	0	1	23.40	5

==== Relief pitchers ====
Note: G = Games pitched; IP = Innings pitched; W = Wins; L = Losses; SV = Saves; ERA = Earned run average; SO = Strikeouts

Player	G	IP	W	L	SV	ERA	SO
Aquilino López	72	73 2/3	1	3	14	3.42	64
Trever Miller	79	52 2/3	2	2	3	4.61	44
Cliff Politte	54	49 1/3	1	5	12	5.66	40
Jeff Tam	44	44 2/3	0	4	1	5.64	26
Jason Kershner	40	54	3	3	0	3.17	32
Doug Creek	21	13 2/3	0	0	0	3.29	11
Dan Reichert	15	16 1/3	0	0	0	6.06	13
Scott Service	15	16	0	0	0	4.50	17
Juan Acevedo	14	12 2/3	1	2	0	4.26	9
Doug Linton	7	9	0	0	0	3.00	7
Brian Bowles	5	7	0	0	0	2.57	2
Vinnie Chulk	3	5 1/3	0	0	0	5.06	2

== Award winners ==
- Carlos Delgado, 1B, Silver Slugger Award
- Roy Halladay, Pitcher of the Month Award, May
- Roy Halladay, Pitcher of the Month Award, September
- Roy Halladay, American League Cy Young Award
- Roy Halladay, The Sporting News Pitcher of the Year Award
- Vernon Wells, OF, Silver Slugger Award

All-Star Game

- Carlos Delgado, first base
- Roy Halladay, pitcher
- Vernon Wells, outfield

== Farm system ==
Level	Team	League	Manager
AAA	Syracuse SkyChiefs	International League	Omar Malavé
AA	New Haven Ravens	Eastern League	Marty Pevey
A	Dunedin Blue Jays	Florida State League	Mike Basso
A	Charleston Alley Cats	South Atlantic League	Mark Meleski
A-Short Season	Auburn Doubledays	New York–Penn League	Dennis Holmberg
Rookie	Pulaski Blue Jays	Appalachian League	Paul Elliott
