= 2003 Chicago White Sox season =

2003 Chicago White Sox
- League: American League
- Division: Central
- Ballpark: U.S. Cellular Field
- City: Chicago
- Record: 86–76 (.531)
- Divisional place: 2nd
- Owners: Jerry Reinsdorf
- General managers: Kenny Williams
- Managers: Jerry Manuel
- Television: WGN-TV/WCIU-TV; FSN Chicago (Ken Harrelson, Darrin Jackson)
- Radio: WMVP (John Rooney, Ed Farmer)

The 2003 Chicago White Sox season was the White Sox's 104th season. They finished with a record of 86–76, good enough for second place in the American League Central, four games behind the champion Minnesota Twins.

The White Sox also hosted the 74th Major League Baseball All-Star Game on July 15.

== Offseason ==
- 12/3/02: Traded closer Keith Foulke, catcher Mark Johnson, and minor league pitcher Joe Valentine to the Oakland Athletics for closer Billy Koch, minor league pitcher Neal Cotts, and minor league outfielder Daylan Holt.
- 12/20/02: Sandy Alomar Jr. was signed as a free agent with the Chicago White Sox.
- 1/15/03: Traded relief pitcher Antonio Osuna and minor league pitcher Delvis Lantigua to the New York Yankees for starting pitcher Orlando Hernández. Traded Hernandez, outfielder Jeff Liefer, and relief pitcher Rocky Biddle to the Montreal Expos for starting pitcher Bartolo Colón and minor league infielder Jorge Nunoz.
- 1/27/03: Signed free agent starting pitcher Esteban Loaiza to a minor league contract.

== Regular season ==
On April 15, 2003, a fan came out of the stands during the baseball game between the Kansas City Royals and Chicago White Sox and attacked first base umpire Laz Diaz. After Carlos Lee flied out to right to end the eighth inning, the fan ran on the field and tried to tackle Diaz, wrapping his arms around the umpire's legs.

=== Season standings ===
AL Central
Team	W	L	Pct.	GB	Home	Road
Minnesota Twins	90	72	.556	—	48‍–‍33	42‍–‍39
Chicago White Sox	86	76	.531	4	51‍–‍30	35‍–‍46
Kansas City Royals	83	79	.512	7	40‍–‍40	43‍–‍39
Cleveland Indians	68	94	.420	22	38‍–‍43	30‍–‍51
Detroit Tigers	43	119	.265	47	23‍–‍58	20‍–‍61

=== Record vs. opponents ===
2003 American League record Source: MLB Standings Grid – 2003
Team	ANA	BAL	BOS	CWS	CLE	DET	KC	MIN	NYY	OAK	SEA	TB	TEX	TOR	NL
Anaheim	—	1–8	3–6	3–4	6–3	6–1	6–3	5–4	3–6	8–12	8–11	6–3	9–10	2–7	11–7
Baltimore	8–1	—	9–10	2–4	3–3	3–3	3–4	3–4	6–13–1	2–7	4–5	8–11	7–2	8–11	5–13
Boston	6–3	10–9	—	5–4	4–2	8–1	5–1	2–4	9–10	3–4	5–2	12–7	5–4	10–9	11–7
Chicago	4–3	4–2	4–5	—	11–8	11–8	11–8	9–10	4–2	4–5	2–7	3–3	3–4	6–3	10–8
Cleveland	3–6	3–3	2–4	8–11	—	12–7	6–13	9–10	2–5	3–6	3–6	5–2	4–5	2–4	6–12
Detroit	1–6	3–3	1–8	8–11	7–12	—	5–14	4–15	1–5	3–6	1–8	2–4	1–6	2–7	4–14
Kansas City	3–6	4–3	1–5	8–11	13–6	14–5	—	11–8	2–4	2–7	4–5	4–3	7–2	1–5	9–9
Minnesota	4–5	4–3	4–2	10–9	10–9	15–4	8–11	—	0–7	8–1	3–6	6–0	5–4	3–3	10–8
New York	6–3	13–6–1	10–9	2–4	5–2	5–1	4–2	7–0	—	3–6	5–4	14–5	4–5	10–9	13–5
Oakland	12–8	7–2	4–3	5–4	6–3	6–3	7–2	1–8	6–3	—	7–12	6–3	15–4	5–2	9–9
Seattle	11–8	5–4	2–5	7–2	6–3	8–1	5–4	6–3	4–5	12–7	—	4–5	10–10	3–4	10–8
Tampa Bay	3–6	11–8	7–12	3–3	2–5	4–2	3–4	0–6	5–14	3–6	5–4	—	3–6	11–8	3–15
Texas	10–9	2–7	4–5	4–3	5–4	6–1	2–7	4–5	5–4	4–15	10–10	6–3	—	5–4	4–14
Toronto	7–2	11–8	9–10	3–6	4–2	7–2	5–1	3–3	9–10	2–5	4–3	8–11	4–5	—	10–8

=== Roster ===
2003 Chicago White Sox
Roster
Pitchers: 37 Jon Adkins; 56 Mark Buehrle; 40 Bartolo Colón; 38 Neal Cotts; 20 Jon Garland; 32 Matt Ginter; 38 Gary Glover; 36 Tom Gordon; 44 Billy Koch; 21 Esteban Loaiza; 43 Dámaso Marte; 50 José Paniagua; 41 Mike Porzio; 52 David Sanders; 60 Scott Schoeneweis; 48 Josh Stewart; 50 Rick White; 46 Dan Wright; 65 Kelly Wunsch	Catchers: 15 Sandy Alomar Jr.; 27 Jamie Burke; 8 Miguel Olivo; 27 Josh Paul; Infielders: 12 Roberto Alomar; 24 Joe Crede; 23 Brian Daubach; 17 Tony Graffanino; 5 D'Angelo Jiménez; 14 Paul Konerko; 39 Aaron Miles; 35 Frank Thomas; 22 José Valentín	Outfielders: 25 Joe Borchard; 27,5 Carl Everett; 12,13 Willie Harris; 45 Carlos Lee; 30 Magglio Ordóñez; 28 Armando Ríos; 33 Aaron Rowand	Manager: 7 Jerry Manuel; Coaches: 34 Don Cooper (pitching); 10 Bruce Kimm (third base); 53 Art Kusnyer (bullpen); 23 Joe Nossek (bench); 1 Rafael Santana (first base); 47 Gary Ward (hitting)

=== Opening Day starters ===
Starters
Position	Player
P	Mark Buehrle
C	Sandy Alomar Jr.
1B	Paul Konerko
2B	D'Angelo Jiménez
3B	Joe Crede
SS	José Valentín
LF	Carlos Lee
CF	Aaron Rowand
RF	Magglio Ordóñez
DH	Frank Thomas

=== Notable transactions ===
- 7/1/03 Traded minor league pitchers Edwin Almonte, Royce Ring, and minor league infielder Andrew Salvo to the New York Mets for 2B Roberto Alomar.
- 7/1/03 Traded minor league pitchers Frank Francisco, Josh Rupe, and Anthony Webster to the Texas Rangers for CF Carl Everett.
- 9/29/03 Fired manager Jerry Manuel.

== Game log ==
=== Regular season ===
Legend
	White Sox win
	White Sox loss
	Postponement
	Eliminated from playoff race
**Bold**	White Sox team member

2003 regular season game log: 86–76 (Home: 51–30; Away: 35–46)
March: 0–1 (Home: 0–0; Away: 0–1)

#	Date	Time (CT)	Opponent	Score	Win	Loss	Save	Time of Game	Attendance	Record	Box/ Streak
1	March 31		@ Royals	0–3	Hernández (1–0)	**Buehrle** (0–1)	MacDougal (1)	2:05	40,302	0–1	box

April: 14–12 (Home: 9–6; Away: 5–6)

#	Date	Time (CT)	Opponent	Score	Win	Loss	Save	Time of Game	Attendance	Record	Box/ Streak
2	April 2		@ Royals	4–5	López (1–0)	**White** (0–1)	MacDougal (2)	2:53	10,429	0–2	box
3	April 3		@ Royals	6–12	Bukvich (1–0)	**Gordon** (0–1)		3:23	9,524	0–3	box
4	April 4		Tigers	5–2	**Loaiza** (1–0)	Cornejo (0–1)	**Koch** (1)	2:26	40,395	1–3	box
5	April 5		Tigers	7–0	**Buehrle** (1–1)	Maroth (0–2)		2:16	16,972	2–3	box
6	April 6		Tigers	10–2	**Marte** (1–0)	Germán (0–1)		2:59	14,514	3–3	box
–	April 7		@ Indians	Postponed (rain) Rescheduled for June 2							
7	April 8		@ Indians	5 – 3 (10)	**Koch** (1–0)	Paronto (0–1)		3:07	42,301	4–3	box
8	April 9		@ Indians	2–5	Anderson (2–0)	**Garland** (0–1)	Báez (3)	2:25	14,841	4–4	box
9	April 10		@ Indians	7–2	**Buehrle** (2–1)	Davis (0–2)		2:25	15,916	5–4	box
10	April 11		@ Tigers	5–0	**Loaiza** (2–0)	Bernero (0–2)		2:10	12,577	6–4	box
11	April 12		@ Tigers	3–4	Cornejo (1–1)	**Stewart** (0–1)	Anderson (1)	3:03	12,985	6–5	box
12	April 13		@ Tigers	3–2	**Colón** (1–0)	Knotts (0–1)	**Koch** (2)	2:27	12,808	7–5	box
13	April 15		Royals	5–8	López (2–0)	**Koch** (1–1)	MacDougal (7)	3:01	20,591	7–6	box
14	April 16		Royals	4–3	**Gordon** (1–1)	Grimsley (0–1)		2:32	9,882	8–6	box
15	April 17		Royals	8–2	**Loaiza** (3–0)	George (2–1)		2:42	10,716	9–6	box
16	April 18		Indians	5–3	**Colón** (2–0)	Traber (0–1)		2:25	13,015	10–6	box
17	April 19		Indians	12–3	**Stewart** (1–1)	Anderson (2–2)		2:33	18,907	11–6	box
18	April 20		Indians	4–7	Davis (2–2)	**Buehrle** (2–2)		2:19	14,975	11–7	box
19	April 21		Indians	2–9	Westbrook (1–2)	**Garland** (0–2)		2:39	15,424	11–8	box
20	April 22		@ Orioles	3–1	**Loaiza** (4–0)	Ponson (1–2)	**Koch** (3)	2:08	18,676	12–8	box
21	April 23		@ Orioles	1–7	Johnson (3–0)	**Colón** (2–1)		2:48	19,908	12–9	box
22	April 24		@ Orioles	4–5	Roberts (2–1)	**Gordon** (1–2)	Julio (6)	2:46	23,731	12–10	box
23	April 25		Twins	1–6	Mays (3–2)	**Buehrle** (2–3)		2:22	14,285	12–11	box
24	April 26		Twins	7–4	**Garland** (1–2)	Lohse (2–3)		2:48	25,381	13–11	box
25	April 27		Twins	3–1	**Loaiza** (5–0)	Reed (1–4)	**Marte** (1)	2:00	22,714	14–11	box
26	April 29		Athletics	2–3	Zito (4–2)	**Colón** (2–2)	Foulke (7)	2:30	13,936	14–12	box
27	April 30		Athletics	1–4	Mulder (4–1)	**Buehrle** (2–4)		1:54	11,084	14–13	box

May: 11–16 (Home: 7–6; Away: 4–10)

#	Date	Time (CT)	Opponent	Score	Win	Loss	Save	Time of Game	Attendance	Record	Box/ Streak
28	May 1		Athletics	7–5	**Garland** (2–2)	Halama (1–2)	**Marte** (2)	2:57	10,639	15–13	box
29	May 2		Mariners	2–9	Franklin (2–2)	**Loaiza** (5–1)		2:39	13,355	15–14	box
30	May 3		Mariners	2–12	García (3–3)	**Stewart** (1–2)		3:16	25,837	15–15	box
31	May 4		Mariners	1 – 5 (6)	Meche (4–1)	**Colón** (2–3)		1:21	15,413	15–16	box
32	May 6		@ Athletics	0–6	Mulder (5–1)	**Buehrle** (2–5)		1:49	10,695	15–17	box
33	May 7		@ Athletics	8–4	**Loaiza** (6–1)	Lilly (2–2)	**Marte** (3)	3:23	20,715	16–17	box
34	May 8		@ Athletics	5–8	Halama (2–2)	**Garland** (2–3)	Foulke (9)	3:00	12,329	16–18	box
35	May 9		@ Mariners	3–6	Franklin (3–2)	**Wright** (0–1)	Nelson (3)	2:43	38,749	16–19	box
36	May 10		@ Mariners	4–3	**Colón** (3–3)	Meche (4–2)	**Marte** (4)	2:34	43,123	17–19	box
37	May 11		@ Mariners	2–7	Moyer (5–2)	**Buehrle** (2–6)		2:40	45,383	17–20	box
38	May 13		Orioles	1–0	**Loaiza** (7–1)	Daal (2–5)	**Koch** (4)	2:27	14,397	18–20	box
39	May 14		Orioles	5–1	**Gordon** (2–2)	Helling (2–4)		2:30	12,078	19–20	box
40	May 15		Orioles	8–2	**Colón** (4–3)	Ponson (4–3)		2:49	11,886	20–20	box
41	May 16		@ Twins	3–18	Radke (5–3)	**Buehrle** (2–7)		2:55	22,233	20–21	box
42	May 17		@ Twins	1–3	Mays (4–3)	**Garland** (2–4)	Guardado (9)	2:20	23,209	20–22	box
43	May 18		@ Twins	2–3	Hawkins (3–0)	**Gordon** (2–3)	Guardado (10)	2:48	25,055	20–23	box
44	May 19		Blue Jays	2–12	Lidle (7–2)	**Wright** (0–2)		2:52	19,628	20–24	box
45	May 20		Blue Jays	4–1	**Colón** (5–3)	Davis (1–3)		3:01	12,857	21–24	box
46	May 21		Blue Jays	6–5	**Marte** (2–0)	Politte (1–3)	**Koch** (5)	2:53	13,076	22–24	box
47	May 23		Tigers	2–3	Maroth (1–9)	**Gordon** (2–4)	Spurling (2)	2:25	15,069	22–25	box
48	May 24		Tigers	0–1	Knotts (2–3)	**Loaiza** (7–2)	Germán (1)	2:35	27,535	22–26	box
49	May 25		Tigers	8 – 5 (12)	**Glover** (1–0)	Sparks (0–1)		3:32	21,398	23–26	box
50	May 26		@ Blue Jays	5–11	Towers (1–0)	**Buehrle** (2–8)	Tam (1)	3:16	19,009	23–27	box
51	May 27		@ Blue Jays	1–5	Halladay (6–2)	**Colón** (5–4)		2:18	19,365	23–28	box
52	May 28		@ Blue Jays	8–0	**Garland** (3–4)	Escobar (2–2)		2:48	36,806	24–28	box
53	May 29		@ Blue Jays	3–2	**Loaiza** (8–2)	Lidle (8–3)	**Koch** (6)	2:54	20,010	25–28	box
54	May 30		@ Indians	3–7	Sabathia (4–2)	**Wright** (0–3)		2:57	24,666	25–29	box
–	May 31		@ Indians	Postponed (rain), rescheduled for July 12							

June: 15–13 (Home: 8–6; Away: 7–7)

#	Date	Time (CT)	Opponent	Score	Win	Loss	Save	Time of Game	Attendance	Record	Box/ Streak
55	June 1		@ Indians	4 – 5 (10)	Boyd (1–1)	**Koch** (1–2)		2:54	22,681	25–30	box
56	June 2		@ Indians	2–5	Anderson (3–5)	**Colón** (5–5)	Báez (11)	2:40	20,892	25–31	box
57	June 3		@ D-backs	1–2	Villarreal (4–3)	**Gordon** (2–5)		2:33	33,544	25–32	box
58	June 4		@ D-backs	6–8	Good (2–1)	**Garland** (3–5)	Valverde (1)	2:43	26,667	25–33	box
59	June 5		@ D-backs	3 – 2 (10)	**Koch** (2–2)	Service (0–2)		2:50	27,747	26–33	box
60	June 6		@ Dodgers	1–2	Ishii (5–2)	**Buehrle** (2–9)	Gagné (21)	2:20	35,503	26–34	box
61	June 7		@ Dodgers	4–1	**Colón** (6–5)	Ashby (0–4)		2:19	44,122	27–34	box
62	June 8		@ Dodgers	10–3	**Loaiza** (9–2)	Pérez (4–4)		2:41	52,637	28–34	box
63	June 10		Giants	5–3	**Garland** (4–5)	Nathan (6–3)		2:51	23,837	29–34	box
64	June 11		Giants	4–11	Foppert (4–5)	**Buehrle** (2–10)		2:59	19,114	29–35	box
65	June 12		Giants	4–8	Nathan (7–3)	**Colón** (6–6)		2:40	22,827	29–36	box
66	June 13		Padres	5–3	**Gordon** (3–5)	Linebrink (1–2)	**Koch** (7)	2:51	14,162	30–36	box
67	June 14		Padres	6–5	**Gordon** (4–5)	Witasick (0–1)	**Koch** (8)	2:51	27,287	31–36	box
68	June 15		Padres	0–1	Pérez (2–3)	**Garland** (4–6)	Beck (1)	2:38	26,491	31–37	box
69	June 16		Red Sox	4–2	**Buehrle** (3–10)	Rupe (1–1)	**Gordon** (1)	2:06	30,779	32–37	box
70	June 17		Red Sox	4–7	Burkett (5–3)	**Colón** (6–7)	Lyon (8)	2:53	19,887	32–38	box
71	June 18		Red Sox	3–1	**Loaiza** (10–2)	Wakefield (5–3)	**Koch** (9)	2:22	18,708	33–38	box
72	June 19		Red Sox	3 – 4 (10)	Lyon (3–3)	**Koch** (2–3)		3:15	17,225	33–39	box
73	June 20		@ Cubs	12–3	**Garland** (5–6)	Estes (6–6)		3:13	39,080	34–39	box
74	June 21		@ Cubs	7–6	**Buehrle** (4–10)	Clement (5–7)	**Koch** (10)	3:13	38,938	35–39	box
75	June 22		@ Cubs	1–2	Zambrano (6–6)	**Marte** (2–1)	Borowski (15)	2:38	38,223	35–40	box
76	June 24		@ Twins	2–1	**Loaiza** (11–2)	Reed (3–8)	**Koch** (11)	2:28	19,229	36–40	box
77	June 25		@ Twins	5 – 6 (11)	Guardado (1–2)	**Koch** (2–4)		3:20	21,338	36–41	box
78	June 26		@ Twins	5–1	**Buehrle** (5–10)	Radke (5–7)		2:06	26,474	37–41	box
79	June 27		Cubs	4–3	**Koch** (3–4)	Alfonseca (0–1)		2:39	45,147	38–41	box
80	June 28		Cubs	7–6	**Koch** (4–4)	Cruz (1–3)		3:28	45,440	39–41	box
81	June 29		Cubs	2–5	Wood (8–5)	**Loaiza** (11–3)		2:47	44,858	39–42	box
82	June 30		Twins	10–3	**Garland** (6–6)	Mays (8–5)		2:37	29,945	40–42	box

July: 17–9 (Home: 9–2; Away: 8–7)

#	Date	Time (CT)	Opponent	Score	Win	Loss	Save	Time of Game	Attendance	Record	Box/ Streak
83	July 1		Twins	6–1	**Buehrle** (6–10)	Radke (5–8)		2:27	30,694	41–42	box
84	July 2		Twins	8 – 6 (12)	**Koch** (5–4)	Guardado (1–3)		3:37	19,555	42–42	box
85	July 4		@ Devil Rays	3–4	Colomé (2–4)	**Koch** (5–5)		2:40	9,493	42–43	box
86	July 5		@ Devil Rays	2–3	Sosa (2–6)	**Loaiza** (11–4)	Carter (14)	2:48	13,365	42–44	box
87	July 6		@ Devil Rays	11–3	**Buehrle** (7–10)	Standridge (0–4)		2:28	11,683	43–44	box
88	July 8		@ Tigers	1–2	Spurling (1–1)	**Garland** (6–7)	Mears (1)	2:19	13,643	43–45	box
89	July 9		@ Tigers	2–4	Bonderman (3–13)	**Colón** (6–8)	Mears (2)	2:24	12,869	43–46	box
90	July 10		@ Tigers	0–1	Cornejo (4–7)	**Loaiza** (11–5)	Mears (3)	2:04	18,206	43–47	box
91	July 11		@ Indians	5–12	Anderson (7–6)	**Wright** (0–4)		2:50	27,712	43–48	box
92	July 12		@ Indians	7 – 4 (10)	**Marte** (3–1)	Mulholland (1–2)	**Gordon** (2)	3:00	24,163	44–48	box
93	July 12		@ Indians	2–4	Westbrook (4–4)	**Porzio** (0–1)	Báez (21)	2:36	27,165	44–49	box
94	July 13		@ Indians	7–4	**Marte** (4–1)	Betancourt (0–1)	**Gordon** (3)	3:11	26,467	45–49	box
—	July 15	7:40 p.m. CDT	**74th All-Star Game in Chicago, IL**								
95	July 17		Tigers	9–10	Maroth (5–13)	**Colón** (6–9)		3:17	17,060	45–50	box
96	July 18		Tigers	7–5	**Buehrle** (8–10)	Roney (1–4)	**Gordon** (4)	2:25	18,868	46–50	box
97	July 19		Tigers	6–2	**Garland** (7–7)	Cornejo (4–8)	**Marte** (5)	2:31	32,245	47–50	box
98	July 20		Tigers	10–1	**Loaiza** (12–5)	Ledezma (3–3)		2:27	20,631	48–50	box
99	July 21		Indians	4–3	**Porzio** (1–1)	Tallet (0–2)	**Gordon** (5)	2:40	31,776	49–50	box
100	July 22		Indians	5–2	**Colón** (7–9)	Davis (7–8)	**Marte** (6)	2:25	20,667	50–50	box
101	July 23		@ Blue Jays	7–6	**White** (1–1)	Acevedo (1–4)	**Marte** (7)	3:03	20,320	51–50	box
102	July 24		@ Blue Jays	4 – 3 (13)	**Gordon** (5–5)	Sturtze (6–5)	**White** (1)	4:12	18,438	52–50	box
103	July 25		Devil Rays	7–2	**Loaiza** (13–5)	Sosa (3–8)		2:49	22,617	53–50	box
104	July 26		Devil Rays	6–10	Malaska (1–0)	**White** (1–2)	Colomé (1)	3:07	29,633	53–51	box
105	July 27		Devil Rays	9–1	**Colón** (8–9)	Kennedy (3–8)		2:29	28,027	54–51	box
106	July 29		@ Royals	9–6	**Buehrle** (9–10)	May (5–5)	**Gordon** (6)	2:52	24,485	55–51	box
107	July 30		@ Royals	15–4	**Garland** (8–7)	Hernández (5–4)		3:10	20,722	56–51	box
108	July 31		@ Royals	8 – 6 (11)	**Schoeneweis** (2–1)	Field (1–1)		3:35	21,352	57–51	box

August: 16–13 (Home: 10–3; Away: 6–10)

#	Date	Time (CT)	Opponent	Score	Win	Loss	Save	Time of Game	Attendance	Record	Box/ Streak
109	August 1		@ Mariners	12–1	**Colón** (9–9)	García (9–11)		2:52	39,337	58–51	box
110	August 2		@ Mariners	0–10	Franklin (8–9)	**Wright** (0–5)		2:22	45,719	58–52	box
111	August 3		@ Mariners	2–8	Meche (12–7)	**Buehrle** (9–11)		2:57	45,632	58–53	box
112	August 4		Royals	9–13	Hernández (6–4)	**Schoeneweis** (2–2)	Levine (1)	3:26	43,922	58–54	box
113	August 5		Royals	5–4	**Loaiza** (14–5)	Snyder (1–6)	**Marte** (8)	2:58	38,973	59–54	box
114	August 6		Royals	4–3	**Colón** (10–9)	Wilson (5–2)	**Marte** (9)	2:55	25,348	60–54	box
115	August 8		Athletics	3–2	**Buehrle** (10–11)	Mulder (15–8)		1:53	24,118	61–54	box
116	August 9		Athletics	2–7	Bradford (6–3)	**Garland** (8–8)		3:01	36,151	61–55	box
117	August 10		Athletics	5–1	**Loaiza** (15–5)	Harden (3–1)		2:45	29,442	62–55	box
118	August 11		@ Angels	8–10	Weber (3–1)	**Colón** (10–10)		3:13	35,889	62–56	box
119	August 12		@ Angels	10–4	**Wright** (1–5)	Ortiz (13–10)		3:17	36,458	63–56	box
120	August 13		@ Angels	1–2	Rodríguez (6–2)	**Buehrle** (10–12)	Percival (24)	2:27	37,563	63–57	box
121	August 14		@ Angels	1–5	Shields (3–3)	**Garland** (8–9)	Percival (25)	2:46	35,056	63–58	box
122	August 15		@ Rangers	5–11	Lewis (6–7)	**Loaiza** (15–6)		2:46	21,186	63–59	box
123	August 16		@ Rangers	8–12	Benoit (8–5)	**Colón** (10–11)		2:50	40,072	63–60	box
124	August 17		@ Rangers	4–6	Powell (3–0)	**Marte** (4–2)	Cordero (11)	2:46	17,015	63–61	box
125	August 18		Angels	4–2	**Gordon** (6–5)	Washburn (9–12)		2:07	32,381	64–61	box
126	August 19		Angels	5–2	**Garland** (9–9)	Shields (3–4)	**Gordon** (7)	2:31	22,396	65–61	box
127	August 20		Angels	5–3	**Loaiza** (16–6)	Lackey (8–12)	**Marte** (10)	2:49	17,879	66–61	box
128	August 21		Rangers	7–3	**Colón** (11–11)	Lewis (6–8)	**Gordon** (8)	2:48	18,305	67–61	box
129	August 22		Rangers	7–1	**Cotts** (1–0)	Dominguez (0–2)		2:34	36,311	68–61	box
130	August 23		Rangers	13–2	**Buehrle** (11–12)	Valdez (7–8)	**Wright** (1)	2:22	33,721	69–61	box
131	August 24		Rangers	0–5	Thomson (12–10)	**Garland** (9–10)		2:26	29,364	69–62	box
132	August 26		@ Yankees	13–2	**Loaiza** (17–6)	Clemens (12–8)		2:59	38,884	70–62	box
133	August 27		@ Yankees	11–2	**Colón** (12–11)	Wells (12–5)		3:09	40,654	71–62	box
134	August 28		@ Yankees	5–7	Mussina (15–7)	**Cotts** (1–1)	Rivera (29)	3:11	40,569	71–63	box
135	August 29		@ Tigers	4–8	Robertson (1–0)	**Buehrle** (11–13)		2:44	15,828	71–64	box
136	August 30		@ Tigers	5–2	**Garland** (10–10)	Maroth (6–19)		2:44	15,786	72–64	box
137	August 31		@ Tigers	6–1	**Loaiza** (18–6)	Cornejo (6–14)		2:28	15,873	73–64	box

September: 13–12 (Home: 8–7; Away: 5–5)

#	Date	Time (CT)	Opponent	Score	Win	Loss	Save	Time of Game	Attendance	Record	Box/ Streak
138	September 2		Red Sox	1–2	Burkett (10–7)	**Colón** (12–12)	Kim (12)	2:41	23,943	73–65	box
139	September 3		Red Sox	4 – 5 (10)	Kim (8–9)	**Gordon** (6–6)		3:14	20,082	73–66	box
140	September 5		Indians	5–3	**Garland** (11–10)	Traber (6–8)	**Gordon** (9)	2:50	27,196	74–66	box
141	September 6		Indians	8–5	**Loaiza** (19–6)	Cressend (2–1)	**Gordon** (10)	2:49	24,796	75–66	box
142	September 7		Indians	7–3	**Schoeneweis** (3–2)	Báez (1–8)		2:56	19,999	76–66	box
143	September 8		Twins	5–2	**Colón** (13–12)	Lohse (12–11)		2:42	32,807	77–66	box
144	September 9		Twins	8–6	**Buehrle** (12–13)	Pulido (0–1)	**Gordon** (11)	3:18	27,623	78–66	box
145	September 10		Twins	1–4	Santana (10–3)	**Garland** (11–11)	Guardado (34)	2:54	22,188	78–67	box
146	September 11		Twins	2–5	Radke (12–10)	**Loaiza** (19–7)		2:30	20,541	78–68	box
147	September 12		@ Red Sox	4–7	Suppan (12–9)	**Wright** (1–6)	Kim (13)	3:14	34,890	78–69	box
148	September 13		@ Red Sox	3–1	**Colón** (14–12)	Wakefield (10–7)		2:21	34,414	79–69	box
149	September 14		@ Red Sox	7–2	**Buehrle** (13–13)	Burkett (10–8)	**Marte** (11)	2:36	34,174	80–69	box
150	September 16		@ Twins	2–5	Radke (13–10)	**Loaiza** (19–8)		2:51	32,921	80–70	box
151	September 17		@ Twins	2–4	Rogers (12–8)	**Garland** (11–12)	Guardado (37)	2:39	40,304	80–71	box
152	September 18		@ Twins	3–5	Lohse (14–11)	**Colón** (14–13)	Guardado (38)	2:55	39,948	80–72	box
153	September 19		Royals	8–5	**Buehrle** (14–13)	Carrasco (6–5)	**Gordon** (12)	2:21	32,812	81–72	box
154	September 20		Royals	1–7	Anderson (13–11)	**Loaiza** (19–9)		2:36	37,367	81–73	box
155	September 21		Royals	4–10	May (10–7)	**Garland** (11–13)		2:31	31,539	81–74	box
156	September 22		Yankees	6 – 3 (10)	**Gordon** (7–6)	White (5–1)		3:21	39,627	82–74	box
157	September 23		Yankees	0–7	Contreras (7–2)	**Buehrle** (14–14)		2:48	31,305	82–75	box
158	September 24		Yankees	9–4	**Loaiza** (20–9)	Mussina (17–8)		2:45	26,019	83–75	box
159	September 25		@ Royals	3–7	Anderson (14–11)	**Wright** (1–7)		2:06	16,438	83–76	box
160	September 26		@ Royals	11–2	**Garland** (12–13)	May (10–8)		2:22	36,598	84–76	box
161	September 27		@ Royals	19–3	**Colón** (15–13)	Wright (1–2)		2:41	37,567	85–76	box
162	September 28		@ Royals	5–1	**Loaiza** (21–9)	Lima (8–3)		2:19	26,261	86–76	box

== Player stats ==
=== Batting ===
Note: G = Games played; AB = At bats; R = Runs scored; H = Hits; 2B = Doubles; 3B = Triples; HR = Home runs; RBI = Runs batted in; BB = Base on balls; SO = Strikeouts; AVG = Batting average; SB = Stolen bases

Player	G	AB	R	H	2B	3B	HR	RBI	BB	SO	AVG	SB
Roberto Alomar, 2B	67	253	42	64	11	1	3	17	30	37	.253	6
Sandy Alomar Jr., C	75	194	22	52	12	0	5	26	4	17	.268	0
Joe Borchard, OF	16	49	5	9	1	0	1	5	5	18	.184	0
Mark Buehrle, P	35	6	0	1	0	0	0	1	0	3	.167	0
Jamie Burke, C, 1B	6	8	0	3	0	0	0	2	0	0	.375	0
Bartolo Colón, P	34	6	0	0	0	0	0	0	0	3	.000	0
Joe Crede, 3B	151	536	68	140	31	2	19	75	32	75	.261	1
Brian Daubach, 1B, OF, DH	95	183	26	42	11	0	6	21	34	54	.230	1
Carl Everett, CF, DH	73	256	40	77	14	0	10	41	22	36	.301	4
Jon Garland, P	32	2	0	0	0	0	0	0	1	0	.000	0
Tony Graffanino, SS, 2B, 3B	90	250	51	65	15	3	7	23	24	37	.260	8
Willie Harris, CF, 2B	79	137	19	28	3	1	0	5	10	28	.204	12
D'Angelo Jiménez, 2B	73	271	35	69	11	5	7	26	32	46	.255	4
Paul Konerko, 1B	137	444	49	104	19	0	18	65	43	50	.234	0
Carlos Lee, LF	158	623	100	181	35	1	31	113	37	91	.291	18
Esteban Loaiza, P	34	5	1	1	0	0	0	0	0	2	.200	0
Aaron Miles, 2B	8	12	3	4	3	0	0	2	0	0	.333	0
Miguel Olivo, C	114	317	37	75	19	1	6	27	19	80	.237	6
Magglio Ordóñez, RF	160	606	95	192	46	3	29	99	57	73	.317	9
Josh Paul, C	13	17	6	6	0	0	0	4	3	3	.353	0
Armando Ríos, OF	49	104	4	22	3	0	2	11	5	13	.212	0
Aaron Rowand, CF	93	157	22	45	8	0	6	24	7	21	.287	0
Frank Thomas, DH, 1B	153	546	87	146	35	0	42	105	100	115	.267	0
José Valentín, SS	144	503	79	119	26	2	28	74	54	114	.237	8
Dan Wright, P	20	2	0	0	0	0	0	0	0	0	.000	0
Team totals	162	5487	791	1445	303	19	220	766	519	916	.263	77

=== Pitching ===
Note: W = Wins; L = Losses; ERA = Earned run average; G = Games pitched; GS = Games started; SV = Saves; IP = Innings pitched; H = Hits allowed; R = Runs allowed; ER = Earned runs allowed; HR = Home runs allowed; BB = Walks allowed; K = Strikeouts

Player	W	L	ERA	G	GS	SV	IP	H	R	ER	HR	BB	K
Jon Adkins	0	0	4.82	4	0	0	9.1	8	5	5	1	7	3
Mark Buehrle	14	14	4.14	35	35	0	230.1	250	124	106	22	63	119
Bartolo Colón	15	13	3.87	34	34	0	242.0	223	107	104	30	70	173
Neal Cotts	1	1	8.10	4	4	0	13.1	15	12	12	1	17	10
Jon Garland	12	13	4.51	32	32	0	191.2	188	103	96	28	75	108
Matt Ginter	0	0	13.50	3	0	0	3.1	2	5	5	1	1	0
Gary Glover	1	0	4.54	24	0	0	35.2	43	18	18	3	16	23
Tom Gordon	7	6	3.16	66	0	12	74.0	57	29	26	4	34	91
Billy Koch	5	5	5.77	55	0	11	53.0	59	36	34	10	29	42
Esteban Loaiza	21	9	2.90	34	34	0	226.1	196	75	73	17	58	207
Dámaso Marte	4	2	1.58	71	0	11	79.2	50	16	14	3	40	87
José Paniagua	0	0	108.00	1	0	0	0.1	3	4	4	0	1	0
Mike Porzio	1	1	6.43	3	3	0	14.0	18	10	10	2	1	9
David Sanders	0	0	6.14	20	0	0	22.0	25	16	15	5	11	14
Scott Schoeneweis	2	1	4.50	20	0	0	26.0	26	16	13	1	11	27
Josh Stewart	1	2	5.96	5	5	0	25.2	28	18	17	4	16	13
Scott Sullivan	0	0	3.77	15	0	0	14.1	9	6	6	2	6	13
Rick White	1	2	6.61	34	0	1	47.2	56	39	35	11	15	37
Dan Wright	1	7	6.15	20	15	1	86.1	91	63	29	16	48	47
Kelly Wunsch	0	0	2.75	43	0	0	36.0	17	13	11	1	29	33
Team totals	86	76	4.17	162	162	36	1431.0	1364	715	663	162	548	1056

== Awards and honors ==
All-Star Game

- Esteban Loaiza, Pitcher, Starter
- Magglio Ordonez, Outfield, Reserve
- Carl Everett, Designated Hitter, Reserve

== Farm system ==
Level	Team	League	Manager
AAA	Charlotte Knights	International League	Nick Capra
AA	Birmingham Barons	Southern League	Wally Backman
A	Winston-Salem Warthogs	Carolina League	Razor Shines
A	Kannapolis Intimidators	South Atlantic League	John Orton
Rookie	Bristol White Sox	Appalachian League	Jerry Hairston, Sr.
Rookie	Great Falls White Sox	Pioneer League	Chris Cron

LEAGUE CHAMPIONS: Winston-Salem
