= 2003 Tampa Bay Devil Rays season =

2003 Tampa Bay Devil Rays
- League: American League
- Division: East
- Ballpark: Tropicana Field
- City: St. Petersburg, Florida
- Record: 63–99 (.389)
- Divisional place: 5th
- Owners: Vince Naimoli
- General managers: Chuck LaMar
- Managers: Lou Piniella
- Television: FSN Florida; WXPX (Joe Magrane, Dewayne Staats, Todd Kalas)
- Radio: WFLA (Paul Olden, Charlie Slowes); WAMA (AM) (Enrique Oliu)

The 2003 Tampa Bay Devil Rays season was their sixth since the franchise was created. This season, they finished last in the American League East with a record of 63–99. Their manager was Lou Piniella who entered his first season with the Devil Rays.

== Regular season ==
=== Season standings ===
AL East
Team	W	L	Pct.	GB	Home	Road
New York Yankees	101	61	.623	—	50‍–‍32	51‍–‍29
Boston Red Sox	95	67	.586	6	53‍–‍28	42‍–‍39
Toronto Blue Jays	86	76	.531	15	41‍–‍40	45‍–‍36
Baltimore Orioles	71	91	.438	30	40‍–‍40	31‍–‍51
Tampa Bay Devil Rays	63	99	.389	38	36‍–‍45	27‍–‍54

=== Record vs. opponents ===
2003 American League record Source: MLB Standings Grid – 2003
Team	ANA	BAL	BOS	CWS	CLE	DET	KC	MIN	NYY	OAK	SEA	TB	TEX	TOR	NL
Anaheim	—	1–8	3–6	3–4	6–3	6–1	6–3	5–4	3–6	8–12	8–11	6–3	9–10	2–7	11–7
Baltimore	8–1	—	9–10	2–4	3–3	3–3	3–4	3–4	6–13–1	2–7	4–5	8–11	7–2	8–11	5–13
Boston	6–3	10–9	—	5–4	4–2	8–1	5–1	2–4	9–10	3–4	5–2	12–7	5–4	10–9	11–7
Chicago	4–3	4–2	4–5	—	11–8	11–8	11–8	9–10	4–2	4–5	2–7	3–3	3–4	6–3	10–8
Cleveland	3–6	3–3	2–4	8–11	—	12–7	6–13	9–10	2–5	3–6	3–6	5–2	4–5	2–4	6–12
Detroit	1–6	3–3	1–8	8–11	7–12	—	5–14	4–15	1–5	3–6	1–8	2–4	1–6	2–7	4–14
Kansas City	3–6	4–3	1–5	8–11	13–6	14–5	—	11–8	2–4	2–7	4–5	4–3	7–2	1–5	9–9
Minnesota	4–5	4–3	4–2	10–9	10–9	15–4	8–11	—	0–7	8–1	3–6	6–0	5–4	3–3	10–8
New York	6–3	13–6–1	10–9	2–4	5–2	5–1	4–2	7–0	—	3–6	5–4	14–5	4–5	10–9	13–5
Oakland	12–8	7–2	4–3	5–4	6–3	6–3	7–2	1–8	6–3	—	7–12	6–3	15–4	5–2	9–9
Seattle	11–8	5–4	2–5	7–2	6–3	8–1	5–4	6–3	4–5	12–7	—	4–5	10–10	3–4	10–8
Tampa Bay	3–6	11–8	7–12	3–3	2–5	4–2	3–4	0–6	5–14	3–6	5–4	—	3–6	11–8	3–15
Texas	10–9	2–7	4–5	4–3	5–4	6–1	2–7	4–5	5–4	4–15	10–10	6–3	—	5–4	4–14
Toronto	7–2	11–8	9–10	3–6	4–2	7–2	5–1	3–3	9–10	2–5	4–3	8–11	4–5	—	10–8

=== Transactions ===
- February 14, 2003: Wayne Gomes was signed as a free agent with the Tampa Bay Devil Rays.
- March 10, 2003: Wayne Gomes was released by the Tampa Bay Devil Rays.
- March 29, 2003: Al Martin was signed as a free agent with the Tampa Bay Devil Rays.
- April 10, 2003: John Rocker signed as a free agent with the Tampa Bay Devil Rays.
- June 27, 2003: John Rocker was released by the Tampa Bay Devil Rays.

==== Draft picks ====
- June 3, 2003: Delmon Young was drafted by the Tampa Bay Devil Rays in the 1st round (1st pick) of the 2003 amateur draft. Player signed September 8, 2003.
- June 3, 2003: Josh Geer was drafted by the Tampa Bay Devil Rays in the 19th round of the 2003 amateur draft, but did not sign.

=== Roster ===
2003 Tampa Bay Devil Rays
Roster
Pitchers: 37 Brandon Backe; 41 Rob Bell; 32 Nick Bierbrodt; 45 Dewon Brazelton; 38 Lance Carter; 49 Jesús Colomé; 50 Chad Gaudin; 54 Geremi González; 58 Travis Harper; 17 Joe Kennedy; 40 Al Levine; 46 Mark Malaska; 37 Seth McClung; 28,40 Jim Parque; 39 Steve Parris; 57 Carlos Reyes; 48 John Rocker; 27 Bobby Seay; 59 Jorge Sosa; 53 Jason Standridge; 43 Jon Switzer; 43 Mike Venafro; 40 Doug Waechter; 47 Víctor Zambrano	Catchers: 44 Toby Hall; 39 Pete Laforest; 20 Javier Valentín; Infielders: 3,14 Brent Abernathy; 8 Marlon Anderson; 25 Damion Easley; 3 Félix Escalona; 16 Travis Lee; 36 Jeff Liefer; 23 Julio Lugo; 10 Rey Ordóñez; 1 Antonio Pérez; 33 Damian Rolls; 26 Jared Sandberg; 22 Terry Shumpert; 3 Jason Smith; 35 Chris Truby	Outfielders: 5 Rocco Baldelli; 13 Carl Crawford; 25 Matt Diaz; 18 Ben Grieve; 19 Aubrey Huff; 24 George Lombard; 9 Al Martin; 32 Adam Piatt; 11 Jason Tyner; Other batters: 60 Jonny Gomes	Manager: 14 Lou Piniella; Coaches: 29 Chris Bosio (pitching); 4 Lee Elia (hitting); 6 Tom Foley (third base); 2 Billy Hatcher (first base); 7 John McLaren (bench); 15 Matt Sinatro (bullpen)

== Player stats ==
= Indicates team leader

=== Batting ===
==== Starters by position ====
Note: Pos = Position; G = Games played; AB = At bats; H = Hits; Avg. = Batting average; HR = Home runs; RBI = Runs batted in

Pos	Player	G	AB	H	Avg.	HR	RBI
C	Toby Hall	130	463	117	.253	12	47
1B	Travis Lee	145	542	149	.275	19	70
2B	Marlon Anderson	145	482	130	.270	6	67
SS	Julio Lugo	117	433	119	.275	15	53
3B	Damian Rolls	107	373	95	.255	7	46
LF	Carl Crawford	151	630	177	.281	5	54
CF	Rocco Baldelli	156	637	184	.289	11	78
RF	Aubrey Huff	162	636	198	.311	34	107
DH	Al Martin	100	238	60	.252	3	26

==== Other batters ====
Note: G = Games played; AB = At bats; H = Hits; Avg. = Batting average; HR = Home runs; RBI = Runs batted in

Player	G	AB	H	Avg.	HR	RBI
Ben Grieve	55	165	38	.230	4	17
Jared Sandberg	55	136	29	.213	6	23
Javier Valentín	49	135	30	.222	3	15
Antonio Pérez	48	125	31	.248	2	12
Rey Ordóñez	34	117	37	.316	3	22
Damion Easley	36	107	20	.187	1	7
Jason Tyner	46	90	25	.278	0	6
Terry Shumpert	59	84	16	.190	2	7
Pete Laforest	19	48	8	.167	0	6
Chris Truby	13	43	12	.279	0	3
George Lombard	13	37	8	.216	1	4
Adam Piatt	14	32	6	.188	2	3
Félix Escalona	10	27	5	.185	0	2
Jeff Liefer	9	25	3	.120	1	3
Jonny Gomes	8	15	2	.133	0	0
Matt Diaz	4	9	1	.111	0	0
Brent Abernathy	2	7	0	.000	0	0
Jason Smith	1	4	1	.250	0	0

=== Pitching ===
==== Starting pitchers ====
Note: G = Games pitched; IP = Innings pitched; W = Wins; L = Losses; ERA = Earned run average; SO = Strikeouts

Player	G	IP	W	L	ERA	SO
Victor Zambrano	34	188.1	12	10	4.21	132
Geremi González	25	156.1	6	11	3.91	97
Rob Bell	19	101.0	5	4	5.52	44
Dewon Brazelton	10	48.1	1	6	6.89	24
Jason Standridge	8	35.1	0	5	6.37	20
Doug Waechter	6	35.1	3	2	3.31	29
Jim Parque	5	17.1	1	1	11.94	8

==== Other pitchers ====
Note: G = Games pitched; IP = Innings pitched; W = Wins; L = Losses; ERA = Earned run average; SO = Strikeouts

Player	G	IP	W	L	ERA	SO
Joe Kennedy	32	133.2	3	12	6.13	77
Jorge Sosa	29	128.2	5	12	4.62	72
Steve Parris	10	43.2	0	3	6.18	14
Chad Gaudin	15	40.0	2	0	3.60	23
Carlos Reyes	10	39.2	0	3	5.22	13
Seth McClung	12	38.2	4	1	5.35	25
Nick Bierbrodt	13	35.1	0	2	9.68	20

==== Relief pitchers ====
Note: G = Games pitched; W = Wins; L = Losses; SV = Saves; ERA = Earned run average; SO = Strikeouts

Player	G	W	L	SV	ERA	SO
Lance Carter	62	7	5	26	4.33	47
Travis Harper	61	4	8	1	3.77	64
Jesús Colomé	54	3	7	2	4.50	69
Al Levine	36	3	5	0	2.90	25
Brandon Backe	28	1	1	0	5.44	36
Mike Venafro	24	1	0	0	4.74	9
Mark Malaska	22	2	1	0	2.81	17
Bobby Seay	12	0	0	0	3.00	5
Jon Switzer	5	0	0	0	7.45	7
John Rocker	2	0	0	0	9.00	0

== Farm system ==
Level	Team	League	Manager
AAA	Durham Bulls	International League	Bill Evers
AA	Orlando Rays	Southern League	Charlie Montoyo
A	Bakersfield Blaze	California League	Omer Muñoz
A	Charleston RiverDogs	South Atlantic League	Mako Oliveras
A-Short Season	Hudson Valley Renegades	New York–Penn League	Dave Howard
Rookie	Princeton Devil Rays	Appalachian League	Jamie Nelson

LEAGUE CHAMPIONS: Durham
