= Myrow =

Myrow is a surname. Notable people with the surname include:

- Brian Myrow (born 1976), American baseball player
- Fred Myrow (1939–1999), American composer
- Josef Myrow (1910–1987), Russian-American composer
