= Jody Gerut =

American baseball player (born 1977)

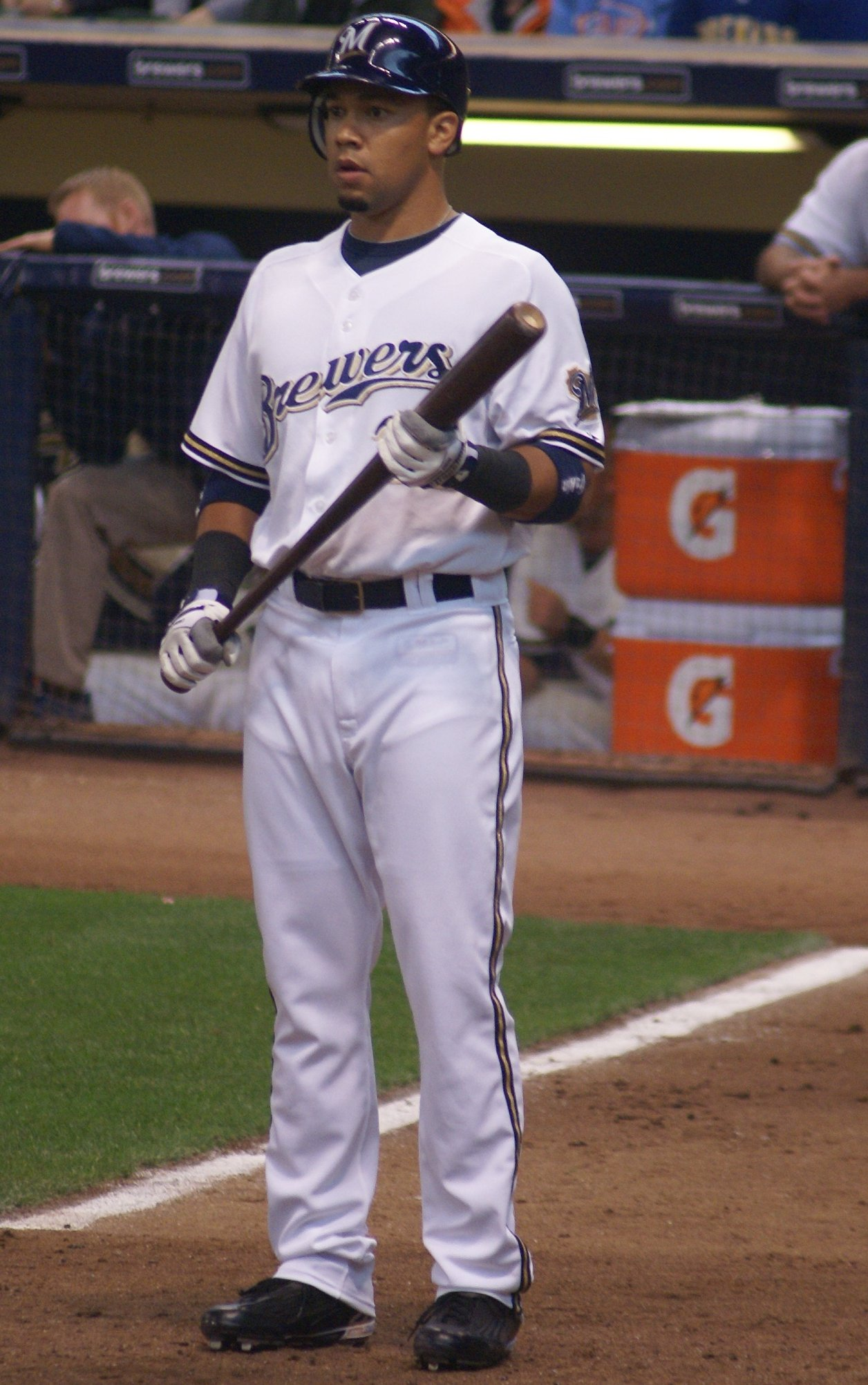
- Gerut with the Milwaukee Brewers
- Outfielder
- Born: September 18, 1977 (age 48); Elmhurst, Illinois, U.S.
- Batted: Left Threw: Left

MLB debut
- April 26, 2003, for the Cleveland Indians

Last MLB appearance
- May 22, 2010, for the Milwaukee Brewers

MLB statistics
- Batting average: .262
- Home runs: 59
- Runs batted in: 226
- Stats at Baseball Reference

Teams
- Cleveland Indians (2003–2005); Chicago Cubs (2005); Pittsburgh Pirates (2005); San Diego Padres (2008–2009); Milwaukee Brewers (2009–2010)
Medals
Men's baseball
Representing United States
World Junior Baseball Championship
Gold medal – first place	1995 Massachusetts	Team

Joseph Diego Gerut (born September 18, 1977) is an American former professional baseball center fielder who played six seasons in Major League Baseball (MLB). Initially drafted by the Colorado Rockies, he played for several teams between 2003 and 2010.

== Amateur career ==
A native of Elmhurst, Illinois, Gerut attended Willowbrook High School, and later Stanford University. In 1996 and 1997, he played collegiate summer baseball with the Harwich Mariners of the Cape Cod Baseball League and was named a league all-star in 1996.

== Professional career ==
Drafted by the Colorado Rockies in the second round of the 1998 Major League Baseball draft, he was traded to the Cleveland Indians with Josh Bard, for Jacob Cruz on June 2, 2001. Gerut finished fourth in American League Rookie of the Year voting and winning the Sporting News Rookie of the Year Award. In 2004, Gerut's season ended when he tore the anterior cruciate ligament in his right knee. Gerut was acquired by the Chicago Cubs from the Indians on July 18, 2005, in exchange for Jason Dubois. On July 31, Gerut was acquired by the Pittsburgh Pirates in exchange for fellow outfielder Matt Lawton. He played briefly for the Pirates in 2005, but did not play for them at all in 2006; on March 8, 2007, the Pirates released him. Gerut did not play during that year.

On January 21, 2008, Gerut signed a minor league contract with an invitation to spring training with the San Diego Padres. Gerut played very well in a starting role for the Padres during the 2008 season. He finished the year with a line of .296 batting average, .351 OBP, and .494 slugging percentage, to go with 14 HR and 48 RBI, while playing mostly in center field. On April 13, 2009, he recorded the first hit and home run in Citi Field history, leading off the game against the host New York Mets, on the third pitch he saw from Mets starting pitcher Mike Pelfrey. Gerut became the first player in major league history to open a new ballpark with a leadoff homer. On May 21, Gerut was traded to the Milwaukee Brewers for outfielder Tony Gwynn Jr.

On May 8, 2010, Gerut hit for the cycle, going 4 for 6 in the Brewers' 17–3 victory over the Arizona Diamondbacks. On August 13, Gerut was unconditionally released by the Brewers. On August 19, Gerut was signed to a minor league contract by the San Diego Padres. In 2010, he was chosen as the 12th-smartest athlete in sports by the Sporting News.

On January 20, 2011, Gerut was signed to a minor league contract by the Seattle Mariners. On February 27, Gerut announced his retirement. He said that his heart was no longer in the game, explaining that he "didn't want to be a player that plays for only his paycheck."

== Post-playing career ==
Following his retirement from baseball, Gerut received an investment adviser license from the United States Securities and Exchange Commission and took a job as a sports agent with Wasserman Media Group.

On August 1, 2018, Gerut served as analyst for the Facebook Live broadcasting crew working the Indians-Twins game.

== Personal life ==
Gerut is of Irish, Polish and Caribbean descent. In 2010, The Sporting News ranked him among the 20 smartest athletes in sports. At the time of his retirement from baseball in 2011, Gerut was living in Oak Park, Illinois with his wife, Mary Swain, and their two young children. He was also expecting a son in September of that year.

== See also ==
- List of Major League Baseball players to hit for the cycle

Achievements
Preceded by B. J. Upton	Hitting for the cycle May 8, 2010	Succeeded by Bengie Molina
