= Josh Stewart (baseball) =

American baseball pitcher (born 1978)

- Pitcher
- Born: December 5, 1978 (age 47); Paducah, Kentucky, U.S.
- Batted: Left Threw: Left

Professional debut
- MLB: April 6, 2003, for the Chicago White Sox
- NPB: 2005, for the Orix Buffaloes

Last appearance
- MLB: August 26, 2004, for the Chicago White Sox
- NPB: 2005, for the Orix Buffaloes

MLB statistics
- Win–loss record: 1–3
- Earned run average: 8.10
- Strikeouts: 18

NPB statistics
- Win–loss record: 0–4
- Earned run average: 8.10
- Strikeouts: 14
- Stats at Baseball Reference

Teams
- Chicago White Sox (2003–2004); Orix Buffaloes (2005)

Joshua Craig Stewart (born December 5, 1978) is an American former professional baseball pitcher. He played in Major League Baseball (MLB) for the Chicago White Sox from 2003 to 2004, and in Nippon Professional Baseball (NPB) for the Orix Buffaloes. He is a left-hander.
