= David Sanders (baseball) =

American baseball player (born 1979)

- Pitcher
- Born: August 29, 1979 (age 46); Oklahoma City, Oklahoma, U.S.
- Batted: Left Threw: Left

MLB debut
- April 23, 2003, for the Chicago White Sox

Last MLB appearance
- September 10, 2005, for the Chicago White Sox

MLB statistics
- Win–loss record: 0–0
- Earned run average: 6.75
- Strikeouts: 15
- Stats at Baseball Reference

Teams
- Chicago White Sox (2003, 2005)

David Andrew Sanders (born August 29, 1979), is an American retired pitcher of Major League Baseball. He played parts of two seasons in the majors, 2003 and 2005, for the Chicago White Sox.
