= Jason Dubois =

American baseball player (born 1979)

- Outfielder
- Born: March 26, 1979 (age 46); Virginia Beach, Virginia, U.S.
- Batted: Right Threw: Right

MLB debut
- May 19, 2004, for the Chicago Cubs

Last MLB appearance
- August 19, 2005, for the Cleveland Indians

MLB statistics
- Batting average: .233
- Home runs: 10
- Runs batted in: 29
- Stats at Baseball Reference

Teams
- Chicago Cubs (2004–2005); Cleveland Indians (2005)

Jason Bradford Dubois (born March 26, 1979) is an American former Major League Baseball outfielder who played for the Chicago Cubs and the Cleveland Indians.

Dubois attended Virginia Commonwealth University, and in 1999 he played collegiate summer baseball with the Harwich Mariners of the Cape Cod Baseball League. He was selected by the Chicago Cubs in the 14th round of the 2000 Major League Baseball draft.

Dubois was drafted by the Toronto Blue Jays in the 2002 Rule 5 Draft, but was returned during spring training 2003. He made his major league debut on May 19, 2004, with the Chicago Cubs. He has played left field, right field, and first base in the majors. On July 18, 2005, he was traded to the Cleveland Indians for fellow outfielder Jody Gerut. On January 2, 2007, Dubois signed a minor league contract with the Baltimore Orioles and spent the entire year with their Triple-A affiliate, the Norfolk Tides, becoming a free agent at the end of the season. On November 27, 2007, he signed a minor league contract with the Washington Nationals, playing for their Triple-A affiliate, the Columbus Clippers, before being released on May 18, 2008.

Within a few days, he signed a minor league contract with the Chicago Cubs to play for their Triple-A affiliate, the Iowa Cubs. He became a free agent at the end of the season and re-signed with the Cubs in January 2009. On August 7, Dubois was traded by the Cubs to the Mets, and was assigned to the Triple-A Buffalo Bisons. Jason re-signed with the Chicago Cubs on February 6, 2010 to again play for the Iowa Cubs. He retired from playing, and in the fall of 2010, he was hired as the hitting coach for the Cubs rookie league team, the Arizona League Cubs. Jason is now the hitting coach for the Helena Brewers. Helena is the rookie level affiliate of the Brewers

In 1998, he set the Coastal Plain League single season home run record with 17.
