= Brian Myrow =

American baseball player (born 1976)

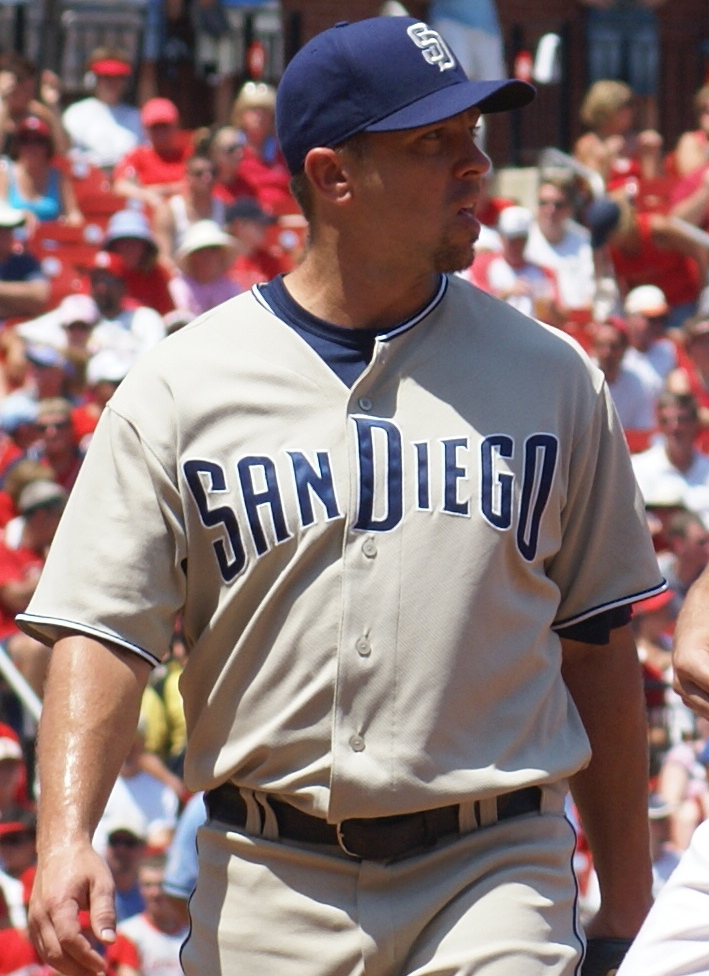
- Myrow with the San Diego Padres in 2008
- First baseman
- Born: September 4, 1976 (age 48); Fort Worth, Texas, U.S.
- Batted: Left Threw: Right

MLB debut
- September 6, 2005, for the Los Angeles Dodgers

Last appearance
- August 21, 2008, for the San Diego Padres

MLB statistics
- Batting average: .157
- Home runs: 1
- Runs batted in: 4
- Stats at Baseball Reference

Teams
- Los Angeles Dodgers (2005); Lotte Giants (2006); San Diego Padres (2007–2008)

Brian Shawn Myrow (born September 4, 1976) is an American former professional baseball player.

== Early and personal life ==
Myrow was born on September 4, 1976, in Fort Worth, Texas. He attended Louisiana Tech University. He is married and has two sons.

== Professional career ==
=== Winnipeg Goldeyes ===
Myrow's professional career started with the independent Winnipeg Goldeyes in 1999. After spending part of three seasons in Winnipeg, he first played affiliated baseball in 2001 in the New York Yankees organization.

=== New York Yankees ===
The New York Yankees purchased Myrow in June 2001. It was the first time he played affiliated baseball. On May 15, 2004, the Yankees traded Myrow to the Los Angeles Dodgers for Tanyon Sturtze.

=== Los Angeles Dodgers ===
On May 15, 2004, the Yankees traded Myrow to the Los Angeles Dodgers for Tanyon Sturtze. Myrow made his Major League Baseball debut with the Dodgers on September 6, 2005.

=== Korea Baseball Organization ===
In 2006, Myrow joined the Lotte Giants of the Korea Baseball Organization.

=== Boston Red Sox ===
In August 2006, Myrow signed with the Boston Red Sox organization.

=== San Diego Padres ===
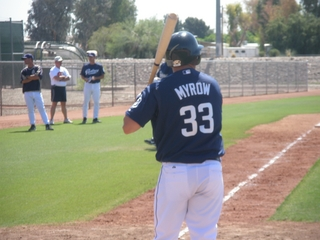
Myrow in minor league spring training game in 2008 for the San Diego Padres.

Myrow signed as a minor league free agent with the San Diego Padres in November 2006. Myrow hit his first career home run on July 8, 2008, off Logan Kensing against the Florida Marlins at Petco Park. He became a free agent at the end of the 2008 season and signed a minor league contract with the Chicago White Sox.

=== Chicago White Sox ===
He became a free agent at the end of the 2008 season and signed a minor league contract with the Chicago White Sox. On June 23, 2009, Myrow was traded to the Pittsburgh Pirates for cash considerations.

=== Pittsburgh Pirates ===
On June 23, 2009, Myrow was traded to the Pittsburgh Pirates for cash considerations.

=== Back to independent baseball ===
In 2011, he returned to the Winnipeg Goldeyes, to play for the organization that launched his professional career. He started 2012 with the Grand Prairie AirHogs. He remained with the AirHogs in 2013 before retiring to become their hitting coach.
