= Danny Core =

American professional baseball player

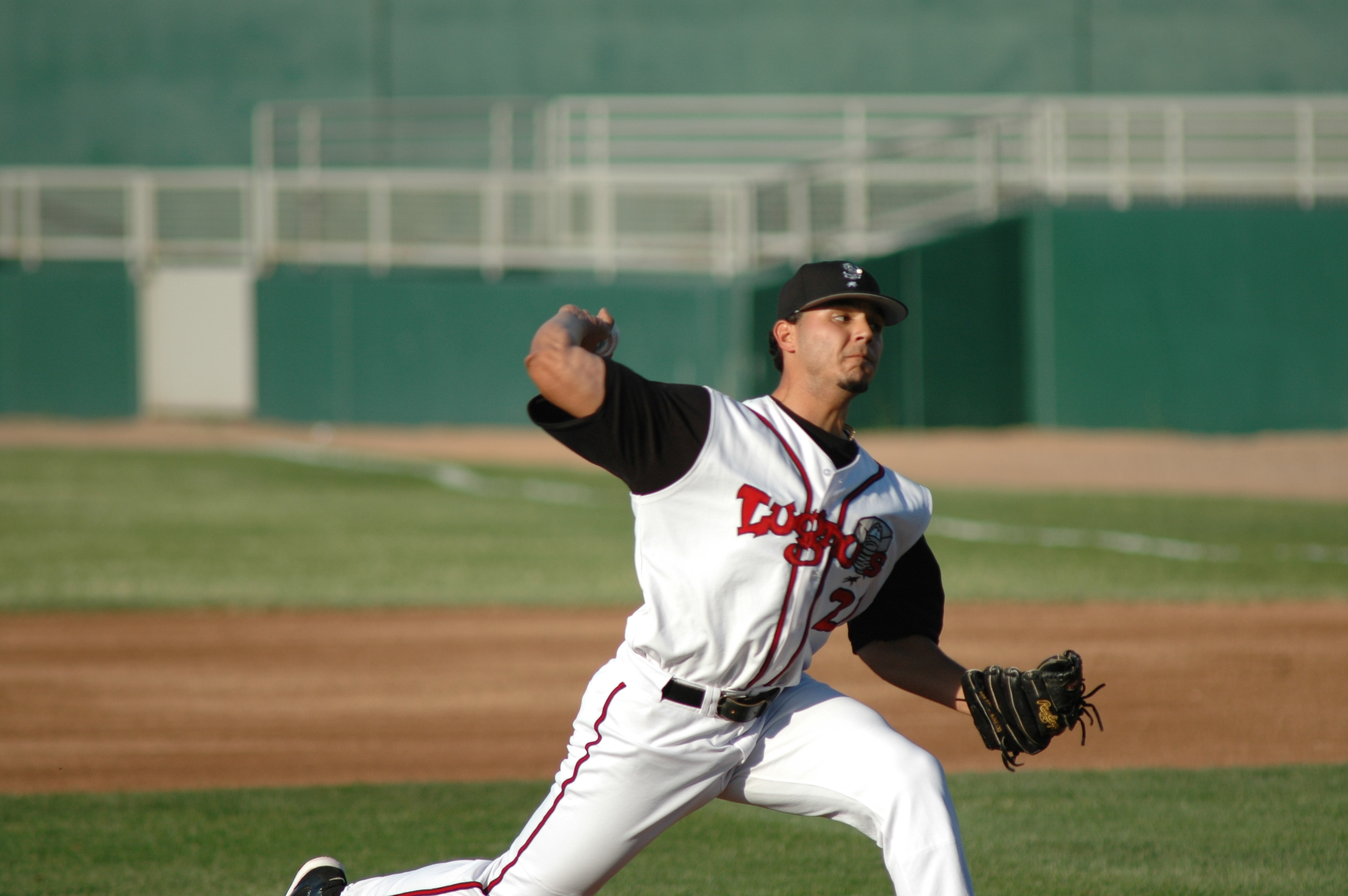
- Pitcher
- Born: July 17, 1981 (age 44); New York, New York, U.S.
- Batted: Right Threw: Right

CPBL debut
- April 28, 2008, for the Brother Elephants

Last appearance
- April 28, 2009, for the Brother Elephants

CPBL statistics
- Win–loss record: 9–7
- Earned run average: 3.67
- Strikeouts: 79
- Stats at Baseball Reference

Teams
- Brother Elephants (2008–2009)
Medals
Men's baseball
Representing United States
World Junior Baseball Championship
Gold medal – first place	1999 Kaohsiung	Team

Daniel Core (born July 17, 1981) is an American professional baseball player. He played two seasons for the Brother Elephants of Chinese Professional Baseball League. In April 2009, he was released by the Elephants due to injury.

Core was originally drafted by the Toronto Blue Jays in 2003. He began his career with the short season Class A Auburn Doubledays, later playing for the Class A Lansing Lugnuts and the Advanced-A Dunedin Blue Jays. He was released by Toronto during the 2007 season, signing with the Kansas City T-Bones of the Northern League before joining the Brother Elephants.
