= Dan Wright (baseball) =

American baseball player (born 1977)

- Pitcher
- Born: December 14, 1977 (age 47); Longview, Texas, U.S.
- Batted: Right Threw: Right

MLB debut
- July 27, 2001, for the Chicago White Sox

Last MLB appearance
- May 1, 2004, for the Chicago White Sox

MLB statistics
- Win–loss record: 20–26
- Earned run average: 5.65
- Strikeouts: 225
- Stats at Baseball Reference

Teams
- Chicago White Sox (2001–2004)

Jonathan Daniel Wright (born December 14, 1977) is a former professional baseball pitcher. He played all or part of four seasons in Major League Baseball for the Chicago White Sox.

Wright grew up in Batesville, Arkansas and graduated from high school from Sullivan South in Kingsport, Tennessee. He pitched for the University of Arkansas from 1997-99. In 1998, he played collegiate summer baseball in the Cape Cod Baseball League for the Yarmouth-Dennis Red Sox.

Wright was drafted in the 2nd round (64th overall) by the Chicago White Sox. He pitched a 5-hit shutout against the Texas Rangers on May 16, 2002.
