= Jeff Tam =

American baseball pitcher (born 1970)

- Pitcher
- Born: August 19, 1970 (age 55); Fullerton, California, U.S.
- Batted: Right Threw: Right

MLB debut
- June 30, 1998, for the New York Mets

Last MLB appearance
- July 9, 2003, for the Toronto Blue Jays

MLB statistics
- Win–loss record: 7–14
- Earned run average: 3.91
- Strikeouts: 146
- Stats at Baseball Reference

Teams
- New York Mets (1998); Cleveland Indians (1999); New York Mets (1999); Oakland Athletics (2000–2002); Toronto Blue Jays (2003)

Jeffrey Eugene Tam (born August 19, 1970) is an American former professional baseball player. He played in Major League Baseball as a right-handed pitcher from 1998 to 2003 for the New York Mets, Cleveland Indians, New York Mets, Oakland Athletics and the Toronto Blue Jays.

== Early years and college career ==
Tam attended Eau Gallie High School in Melbourne, Florida where he played second base and was a teammate of Toronto Blue Jays draft pick Mark Fuller. In 1991, Tam led the Florida Space Coast Baseball League (Stan Musial Division) in hits and runs batted in while playing for the Melbourne Bombers. He then played college baseball for the Florida State Seminoles baseball team under head coach Mike Martin, before being signed as an undrafted free agent by the New York Mets in the 1993 MLB draft.

== Professional career ==
Tam was a replacement player in spring training in 1995 during the players' strike. As a result, he was barred from membership in the Major League Baseball Players Association.

Tam made his major league debut with the Mets in 1998 at the age of 27. He later pitched from 1999 through 2003 for the Cleveland Indians, Oakland Athletics and Toronto Blue Jays.

In a six-year career, Tam posted a 7–14 record with a 3.91 ERA and seven saves in 251 relief appearances. His most productive season came in 2000, when he appeared in 72 games and had a career-best ERA of 2.63. This time he was the top set-up man on an Oakland A's team that advanced to the playoffs.

Tam last played professionally for the Bridgeport Bluefish of the independent Atlantic League in 2008.

In 2012, Tam was hired by Eastern Florida State College as head coach of its baseball team and director of its new intramural athletics program. Previously, Tam worked as pitching coach and chief assistant coach under Ernie Rosseau in 2011 and served as interim head coach after Rosseau retirement.

== Personal life ==
Tam and his wife were married right after he got out of college. In 2000 they had a daughter; in 2006 they had their second daughter.
