= Cliff Politte =

American baseball player (born 1974)

- Pitcher
- Born: February 27, 1974 (age 52); St. Louis, Missouri, U.S.
- Batted: Right Threw: Right

MLB debut
- April 2, 1998, for the St. Louis Cardinals

Last MLB appearance
- July 15, 2006, for the Chicago White Sox

MLB statistics
- Win–loss record: 22–23
- Earned run average: 4.40
- Strikeouts: 342
- Stats at Baseball Reference

Teams
- St. Louis Cardinals (1998); Philadelphia Phillies (1999–2002); Toronto Blue Jays (2002–2003); Chicago White Sox (2004–2006)

Career highlights and awards
- World Series champion (2005)

Clifford Anthony Politte /pɒˈliːt/ (born February 27, 1974) is an American former professional baseball (right-handed) relief pitcher, who played in Major League Baseball (MLB) for four big league teams. He was selected in the 54th round of the 1995 Major League Baseball draft by the St. Louis Cardinals as the 1,438th player selected. Politte came up to the parent club in 1998. He threw the first pitch at the new Roger Dean Stadium in spring training, that year. From there, Politte went to the Philadelphia Phillies and then the Toronto Blue Jays, before signing with the Chicago White Sox in 2004.

Politte had perhaps his best season in 2005, setting career bests with 7 wins, a 2.00 ERA and a 0.94 WHIP as the White Sox won the 2005 World Series.

Politte was designated for assignment by the White Sox on July 15, 2006, after giving up a home run to Bubba Crosby and was released on July 20.

On February 14, 2007, the Cleveland Indians signed Politte to a minor league deal. He pitched only eight innings for their Double-A team in 2007.

On December 21, 2007, the St. Louis Cardinals signed Politte to a minor league deal, with an invitation to spring training. He became a free agent at the end of the season. Politte resides in St. Louis, Missouri.
