= Dámaso Marte =

Dominican baseball player (born 1975)

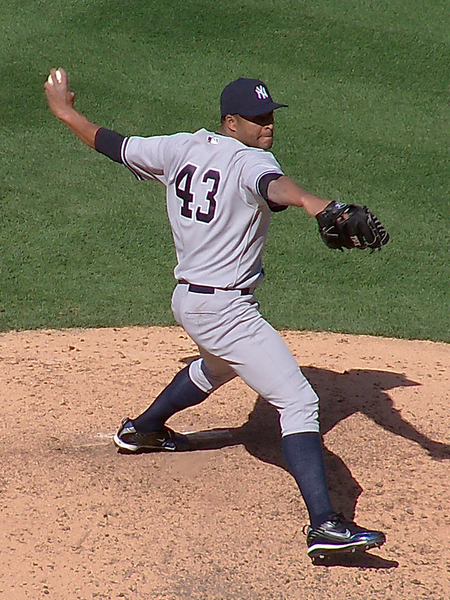
- Marte with the New York Yankees
- Pitcher
- Born: February 14, 1975 (age 51); Santo Domingo, Dominican Republic
- Batted: Left Threw: Left

MLB debut
- June 30, 1999, for the Seattle Mariners

Last MLB appearance
- July 7, 2010, for the New York Yankees

MLB statistics
- Win–loss record: 23–27
- Earned run average: 3.48
- Strikeouts: 533
- Stats at Baseball Reference

Teams
- Seattle Mariners (1999); Pittsburgh Pirates (2001); Chicago White Sox (2002–2005); Pittsburgh Pirates (2006–2008); New York Yankees (2008–2010)

Career highlights and awards
- 2× World Series champion (2005, 2009)

Dámaso Marte Saviñón (born February 14, 1975) is a Dominican former professional baseball relief pitcher. He played for the Seattle Mariners (1999), Pittsburgh Pirates (2001, 2006–2008), Chicago White Sox (2002–2005), and New York Yankees (2008–2011).

== Professional career ==
=== Seattle Mariners ===
Marte was signed as an amateur free agent by the Seattle Mariners in 1992. He made his major league debut on June 30, 1999, during a 14–5 loss against the Oakland Athletics, allowing three earned runs in an inning of work.

=== Pittsburgh Pirates ===
On November 16, 2000, Marte signed with the New York Yankees, but was traded to the Pittsburgh Pirates on June 13, 2001, for Enrique Wilson. In his Pirates debut, he hurled three innings of one-hit ball against the Montreal Expos. He went on to throw 14 innings in which he only allowed one run and struck out a career-high five batters against the Cincinnati Reds.

=== Chicago White Sox ===
On March 27, 2002, Marte along with Edwin Yan were traded to the Chicago White Sox for Matt Guerrier. In 2003, he enjoyed his most successful big league season, where he went 4–2 with a 1.58 ERA in 79 2/3 innings pitched where he struck out a career high 87 batters. He continued his success in 2004 when he held opposing batters to a .217 batting average and left-handed batters to an average of .143. He also matched his career high for strikeouts in a game with 5 against the Florida Marlins.

In 2005, Marte went 3–4 with a 3.77 ERA in 45 1/3 innings pitched for the division-winning White Sox. Marte was the winning pitcher in what was then the longest game in World Series history, Game 3 of the 2005 World Series. Having only one appearance during the postseason run to that point (in which he allowed all three hitters he faced to reach base), Marte came on in a tie game in the 13th inning and tossed 1 2/3 scoreless innings, striking out three batters in the eventual 14-inning win over the Houston Astros. The White Sox would then win the World Series against the Astros in 4 games.

=== Second stint with Pirates ===
On December 8, 2005, the White Sox traded Marte back to the Pittsburgh Pirates in exchange for Rob Mackowiak. Marte made three relief appearances in the World Baseball Classic for the Dominican Republic in 2006 but was shut down after experiencing shoulder inflammation. In the regular season, he lost seven straight games as a reliever but still averaged 9.7 strikeouts per nine innings pitched.

In 2007, he enjoyed some success where he held left-handed batters to a .094 batting average. He also did not allow a hit in 32 consecutive at-bats against left-handers which happened to be the longest streak of consecutive hitless at-bats by a left-handed batter against any pitcher in the MLB. For a stint, after an injury to Matt Capps, Marte was the Pirates closing pitcher. He amassed five saves before being traded to the Yankees.

=== New York Yankees ===
On July 26, 2008, Marte and Xavier Nady were traded to the Yankees in exchange for José Tábata, Ross Ohlendorf, Jeff Karstens, and Daniel McCutchen. In his Yankees debut, he relieved José Veras (for only one batter), and faced David Ortiz, who struck out swinging.

Following the 2008 season, the Yankees declined Marte's option. However, the Yankees then re-signed him to a new three-year deal with an option for a fourth.

Following a disappointing regular season in which Marté posted an ERA of 9.45, he delivered an extraordinary performance for the Yankees in the playoffs. After a shaky first outing in Game 2 of the 2009 American League Division Series, in which he surrendered two consecutive singles to the Minnesota Twins before being relieved, Marte retired all twelve of the remaining batters he faced during the postseason. During Game 6 of the 2009 World Series, Marte faced Philadelphia Phillies stars Chase Utley and Ryan Howard, striking out both of them on the minimum six pitches. Marte and the Yankees went on to win Game 6, clinching the Series for the team's 27th championship. Having not surrendered a run during the 2005 playoff run with the White Sox, Marte finished his career with 7 1/3 scoreless playoff innings.

Marte missed much of the 2010 season due to left arm inflammation. He underwent left shoulder surgery late in the 2010 season and was knocked out for the entire 2011 season. In late June, Marte started to play catch in his journey to recovery. He became a free agent at the end of the 2011 season after the Yankees declined his 2012 option and paid him a $250,000 buyout.

== Children's Foundation ==
Marte supports a children's foundation in his name.
