= Billy Koch =

American baseball pitcher (born 1974)

- Pitcher
- Born: December 14, 1974 (age 51); Rockville Centre, New York, U.S.
- Batted: Right Threw: Right

MLB debut
- May 5, 1999, for the Toronto Blue Jays

Last MLB appearance
- August 26, 2004, for the Florida Marlins

MLB statistics
- Win–loss record: 29–25
- Earned run average: 3.89
- Strikeouts: 357
- Saves: 163
- Stats at Baseball Reference

Teams
- Toronto Blue Jays (1999–2001); Oakland Athletics (2002); Chicago White Sox (2003–2004); Florida Marlins (2004)

Career highlights and awards
- AL Rolaids Relief Man Award (2002)
Medals
Men's baseball
Representing United States
Olympic Games
Bronze medal – third place	1996 Atlanta	Team

William Christopher Koch (/kɒtʃ/ KOTCH; born December 14, 1974) is an American former Major League Baseball relief pitcher. He was born in Rockville Centre, New York and went to West Babylon High School.

He debuted in the majors with the Toronto Blue Jays and last pitched in MLB with the Florida Marlins in 2004.

== Baseball career ==
Koch played college baseball for Clemson University from 1994 to 1996. He was drafted by the Toronto Blue Jays in the first round (fourth pick) of the 1996 amateur draft and made his debut in 1999. He made an instant impression by regularly hitting 100 MPH with his fastball.

Koch won a bronze medal with the United States national baseball team at the 1996 Summer Olympics in Atlanta.

He was groomed for the role of closer, and had mixed success at the role over the next three seasons. While he was regarded as one of the most dominating pitchers in the league when he was at his best, at times he battled with his control and composure on the mound. Nevertheless, he continued to post improving save numbers (31, 33 and 36) from 1999 to 2001.

On December 7, 2001, the Blue Jays, now under new management, traded Koch to the Oakland Athletics for Eric Hinske and Justin Miller. The trade ended up working out for both teams, as Eric Hinske statistically outperformed Koch in his first season with the Jays while Oakland proved to be a good fit for closer Koch. He saved 44 games in 2002 while posting a 3.27 ERA and 93 strikeouts in 93 2/3 innings as well as earning 11 wins, becoming the first pitcher in major league history to earn 10 wins and 40 saves in one season. He won the Rolaids Relief Man Award based on his statistical performance that year. Koch, however, gave up a critical ninth-inning home run to Minnesota's A. J. Pierzynski in the deciding game of the A's first-round playoff series. That outing would turn out to be the turning point in Koch's career.

On December 3, 2002, he was once again traded, this time to the Chicago White Sox along with two minor leaguers for Keith Foulke, Mark Johnson, Joe Valentine and cash, but was unable to replicate the successes he had experienced with Toronto or Oakland. Due to wild inconsistency on the mound, Jerry Manuel removed Koch from the role of closer, relegating him to middle relief. Koch finished the season with a disappointing 11 saves and a high 5.77 ERA.

His troubles continued in 2004. He was once again tried in the role of closer, but saved only 8 games in 24 games played, compiling an ERA of 5.40. He was traded to the Florida Marlins in June for Wilson Valdez, a minor-league second baseman who it was assumed would replace Luis Castillo before the latter signed a four-year contract to remain with Florida. Koch fared better in Florida than he did in Chicago, with a 1–2 record and a 3.51 ERA in 23 games as a setup man for Armando Benítez.

Following the 2004 season he was signed to a 1-year contract by his original team, the Toronto Blue Jays, though the team released him during spring training and an angry Koch announced he would not attempt to sign with another team, so that the Blue Jays would be on the hook for 'every penny' of his $950,000 salary. He has not played baseball professionally since then.

Koch was featured in the film Moneyball in 2011 as the A's primary closer for their record breaking 20 game winning streak.

== See also ==
- List of Major League Baseball leaders in games finished
