= Tanyon Sturtze =

American baseball player (born 1970)

- Pitcher
- Born: October 12, 1970 (age 55); Worcester, Massachusetts, U.S.
- Batted: Right Threw: Right

MLB debut
- May 3, 1995, for the Chicago Cubs

Last MLB appearance
- August 25, 2008, for the Los Angeles Dodgers

MLB statistics
- Win–loss record: 40–44
- Earned run average: 5.19
- Strikeouts: 480
- Stats at Baseball Reference

Teams
- Chicago Cubs (1995–1996); Texas Rangers (1997); Chicago White Sox (1999–2000); Tampa Bay Devil Rays (2000–2002); Toronto Blue Jays (2003); New York Yankees (2004–2006); Los Angeles Dodgers (2008)

Tanyon James Sturtze (born October 12, 1970) is an American former Major League Baseball pitcher.

== Early life and education ==
He attended Saint Peter-Marian High School then Quinsigamond Community College and was drafted by the Oakland Athletics in the 1990 Major League Baseball draft.

== MLB career ==
In 1994, he was selected by the Chicago Cubs in the minor league portion of the Rule 5 draft. He pitched two innings, allowing two runs, with the major league team that year. He spent the next two seasons alternating between the Triple-A Iowa Cubs and the Chicago Cubs, and in 1997, he signed with the Texas Rangers, again alternating between the major and minor league squads. In 1998, he did not play major league ball, and in 1999, he became a member of the Chicago White Sox, becoming a permanent major league reliever. He was dealt to the Tampa Bay Devil Rays in exchange for Tony Graffanino in the 2000 season, and became a key starter for the perennially last-place Devil Rays. However, the 2002 season was a dismal one for Sturtze, as he recorded the lowest winning percentage among all qualified starters (.182) and led the majors in losses (18), earned runs allowed (129), hits allowed (271), walks allowed (89) and batters faced (1008). Although he was the team’s workhorse, ranking seventh in innings pitched (224.0), which was then a Devil Rays record, games started (33), and third in home runs allowed (33). The 2002 Devil Rays had the worst pitching staff in the major leagues (5.29 ERA), and surrendered the most runs (918).

In 2003, he joined the Toronto Blue Jays. In April 2004, Sturtze signed with the Los Angeles Dodgers and on May 15, 2004, he was traded to the New York Yankees for Brian Myrow. With the Yankees he became a consistent reliever, helping the Yankees to win the AL East in 2004. On July 24, 2004, he was involved in a brawl with the Boston Red Sox. After a fight broke out between Jason Varitek and Alex Rodriguez, Sturtze tangled with Gabe Kapler, David Ortiz, and Trot Nixon, and he emerged from the fight with a cut below his ear and blood smeared on his jersey. He missed most of the 2006 season after having season-ending surgery to repair a slight tear in his right rotator cuff.

On December 3, 2006, Sturtze signed a one-year $750,000 contract with the Atlanta Braves. The contract paid him an additional $350,000 if he spent one day on the active 25 man roster. However, in March 2007, Sturtze was placed on the 15-day DL, he was transferred to the 60-day DL in May 2007 and given his unconditional release on August 21.

Sturtze was signed to a minor league contract with an invitation to spring training by the Los Angeles Dodgers on December 12, 2007. He was assigned to the Dodgers Double-A affiliate, the Jacksonville Suns and was later promoted to the Triple-A Las Vegas 51s. He was called up to the majors on August 14, 2008, but was designated for assignment on August 28, and was sent outright to the minors a few days later. Sturtze requested to stay with the team in some capacity, so he was made a bullpen catcher for the remainder of the season and into the playoffs.

In January 2009, Sturtze re-signed with the Dodgers to a minor league contract with an invitation to spring training. He did not make the Major League roster and was assigned to the AAA Albuquerque Isotopes. The Dodgers released Sturtze on May 1.

== Personal life ==
Tanyon is the Advisory Board Chairman for The Pinstripes Sports Dreams Foundation. The foundation gives youth travel baseball players that cannot afford professional coaching, equipment and team fees the opportunity to play elite travel baseball. PinstripesSportsDreamsFoundation.Org

After retiring, Sturtze began a second career as an insurance salesman with the Hotaling Group in New York.

Preceded by Albie Lopez	Tampa Bay Devil Rays Opening Day; Starting pitcher 2002	Succeeded by Joe Kennedy
