= Doug Waechter =

American baseball player (born 1981)

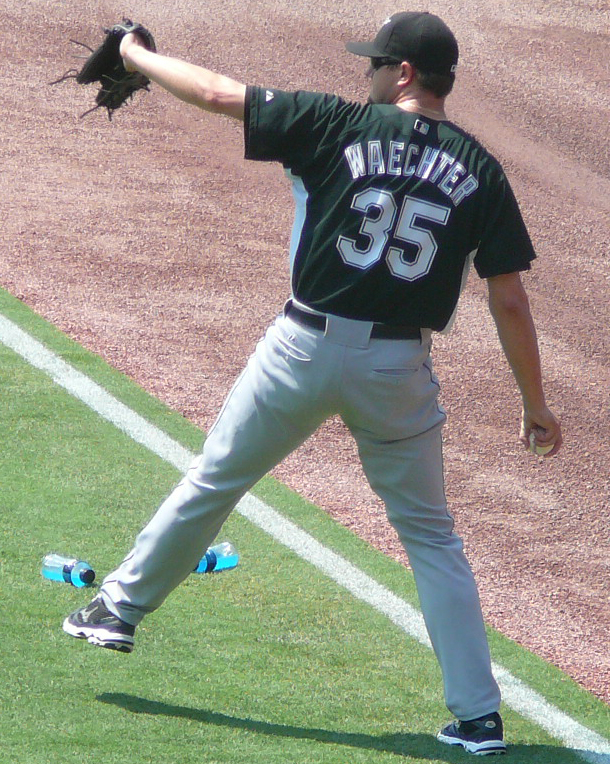
- Waechter with the Florida Marlins
- Pitcher
- Born: January 28, 1981 (age 45); St. Petersburg, Florida, U.S.
- Batted: Right Threw: Right

MLB debut
- August 27, 2003, for the Tampa Bay Devil Rays

Last MLB appearance
- August 11, 2009, for the Kansas City Royals

MLB statistics
- Win–loss record: 18–27
- Earned run average: 5.34
- Strikeouts: 226
- Stats at Baseball Reference

Teams
- Tampa Bay Devil Rays (2003–2006); Florida Marlins (2008); Kansas City Royals (2009)

Douglas Michael Waechter (born January 28, 1981) is an American former professional baseball pitcher for the Tampa Bay Devil Rays, Florida Marlins and Kansas City Royals of Major League Baseball.

== Career ==
He graduated from Northeast High School and was then drafted by the Devil Rays in the 3rd round of the 1999 Major League Baseball draft. He played with the Princeton Rays in his first year as a professional. During his minor league career he threw a no-hitter when he was with the Single-A short season club, the Hudson Valley Renegades. Since making his major league debut in 2003, he was shuffled back and forth between Triple-A Durham and Tampa Bay, making 54 starts with the Devil Rays.

In his first major league start at home, and second overall, on September 3, 2003 against the Seattle Mariners, he threw a 2-hit complete game shutout, which would remain the best single-game performance of his career. Over four seasons with the Devil Rays, from 2003 through 2006, he was 14-25 with a 5.62 ERA.

After having shoulder surgery in October 2006, he was released by the team on November 22. He then made a comeback with the D-Rays, being put on the 60-day DL. His season compiled of two rehab starts with the Hudson Valley Renegades. His rehab starts were against the Staten Island Yankees, the New York Yankees affiliate, and the Brooklyn Cyclones, the New York Mets affiliate. He finished with a 1-1 record giving up three runs in the two rehab starts.

During the 2007 offseason, he was signed to a minor league contract by the Florida Marlins. After spring training, he was assigned to the Triple-A Albuquerque Isotopes. His contract was purchased on April 18, 2008, and he was promoted to the Marlins as a relief pitcher. In 2007, he had arguably his most successful major league season as a relief pitcher, appearing in 48 games for Florida with a 4-2 record and a 3.69 ERA. Having played most of his career in the American League, with the National League Marlins, he got the only hit of his major league career on June 6, 2008 against the Cincinnati Reds. The Marlins, however, parted ways with him after the season, granting him his free agency on October 1, 2008.

On December 11, 2008, Waechter signed a one-year deal with the Kansas City Royals. He pitched for Kansas City during the 2009 season and appeared in only 5 games as a relief pitcher with a 0-0 record and an 8.77 ERA. He was released on November 21, 2009, and became a free agent. After failing to draw interest from any major league clubs in 2010 or 2011, he announced his retirement on June 25, 2011.

For his six-year major league career, he finished with 18 wins and 27 losses, in 113 appearances, including 54 starts with one complete game shutout and a career ERA of 5.34.

== Personal life ==
Waechter married his wife, Kristin, in 2005.

Waechter has occasionally appeared as a sportscaster alongside Dewayne Staats covering Rays games for Bally Sports Sun (formerly Fox Sports Sun). He also serves as a realtor for DMK Group at Douglas Elliman Real Estate.

He has two children. His oldest son is named Kaden. He attended Jesuit High School and won a gold medal with the USA National U18 baseball team in the 2025 U-18 Baseball World Cup before his senior year. He won the FHSAA 4A baseball state championship in his senior year with a 1.15 ERA and 82 strikeouts in 61 innings. He attended the 2026 MLB Draft combine at Chase Field and was considered a top prospect for the 2026 Major League Baseball draft. He was drafted by the San Francisco Giants with the 55th pick in the draft. He signed with the Giants for an over-slot signing bonus of $3.25 million. His daughter Karsyn plays softball.
