= Jeff Liefer =

American baseball player (born 1974)

- Outfielder / First baseman
- Born: August 17, 1974 (age 51); Fontana, California, U.S.
- Batted: Left Threw: Right

Professional debut
- MLB: April 7, 1999, for the Chicago White Sox
- NPB: April 25, 2006, for the Seibu Lions

Last appearance
- MLB: September 30, 2005, for the Cleveland Indians
- NPB: September 28, 2007, for the Seibu Lions

MLB statistics
- Batting average: .230
- Home runs: 31
- Runs batted in: 113

NPB statistics
- Batting average: .256
- Home runs: 21
- Runs batted in: 60
- Stats at Baseball Reference

Teams
- Chicago White Sox (1999–2002); Montreal Expos (2003); Tampa Bay Devil Rays (2003); Milwaukee Brewers (2004); Cleveland Indians (2005); Seibu Lions (2006–2007)

Jeffrey Dale Liefer (born August 17, 1974) is an American former professional baseball outfielder and first baseman. He played in Major League Baseball (MLB) for the Chicago White Sox, Montreal Expos, Tampa Bay Devil Rays, Milwaukee Brewers, and Cleveland Indians between 1999 and 2005.

== Career ==
A native of Fontana, California, Liefer attended Upland High School and California State University, Long Beach. In 1995, he played collegiate summer baseball with the Chatham A's of the Cape Cod Baseball League. He was drafted in the first round of the 1995 MLB draft by the Chicago White Sox. Liefer has played for the White Sox, Montreal Expos, Tampa Bay Devil Rays, Milwaukee Brewers, and the Cleveland Indians.

He played for the Seibu Lions of the Nippon Professional Baseball (NPB) during the 2006-2007 seasons. Liefer signed a minor league contract with the Chicago White Sox on January 12, 2008, but retired in June.

Liefer was once stuck in the bathroom during a minor league game. Liefer said he went to the bathroom during the game and when he wanted to come out the handle was stuck. It delayed the game 20 minutes. This produced the semi-famous quote, "I don't want to be remembered as the guy who got stuck in the bathroom".(Story)
