= Lance Carter (baseball) =

American baseball player (born 1974)

- Pitcher
- Born: December 18, 1974 (age 51); Bradenton, Florida, U.S.
- Batted: Right Threw: Right

Professional debut
- MLB: September 15, 1999, for the Kansas City Royals
- NPB: 2007, for the Orix Buffaloes

Last appearance
- MLB: May 26, 2006, for the Los Angeles Dodgers
- NPB: 2007, for the Orix Buffaloes

MLB statistics
- Win–loss record: 13–12
- Earned run average: 4.15
- Strikeouts: 127

NPB statistics
- Win–loss record: 3–5
- Earned run average: 4.48
- Strikeouts: 50
- Stats at Baseball Reference

Teams
- Kansas City Royals (1999); Tampa Bay Devil Rays (2002–2005); Los Angeles Dodgers (2006); Orix Buffaloes (2007)

Career highlights and awards
- All-Star (2003)

Lance David Carter (born December 18, 1974) is an American former professional baseball relief pitcher and current minor league pitching coach. He pitched in Major League Baseball (MLB) with the Kansas City Royals, Tampa Bay Devil Rays, and Los Angeles Dodgers. He batted and threw right-handed.

== Playing career ==
Selected by the Kansas City Royals in the 21st round of the 1994 Major League Baseball draft out of Manatee Community College, Carter spent 6 years in the Royals minor league system, including losing the entire 1997 season due to injury, before making his major league debut with the Royals on September 15, 1999. Carter did not play in the majors in 2000 and became a free agent at the end of the season. He did not play at all in 2001 and signed with the Tampa Bay Devil Rays on January 11, 2002. Carter had a career year in 2003; Carter became the Devil Rays closer and was elected to the All-Star Game as a reserve, but did not play. During the 2003 season, he went 7–5 with a 4.33 ERA. In 2004, Carter had a 3.47 ERA in 56 games, and a 4.89 ERA in 39 games in 2005.

On January 14, 2006, Carter and Danys Báez were traded to the Los Angeles Dodgers for Edwin Jackson and minor leaguer Chuck Tiffany. Carter struggled in his 10 games for the Dodgers before he was sent down to Triple-A Las Vegas. A free agent after the 2006 season, Carter signed with the Orix Buffaloes of Nippon Professional Baseball in Japan. Carter pitched in just about every role for the Buffaloes, with 11 starts in 34 games and 6 saves with a 4.48 ERA.

On January 2, 2008, he signed a minor league contract with the Toronto Blue Jays with an invitation to spring training. He pitched three scoreless innings in spring training for the Blue Jays, but was sent to minor league camp. He spent the entire 2008 season on the minor league disabled list and became a free agent at the end of the season.

== Post-playing career ==
After retiring from the field, Carter served as a pitching coach for the University of South Florida, and in the Philadelphia Phillies' organization. Carter played a similar role for the Lowell Spinners, short-season affiliate of the Boston Red Sox, from 2015 to 2017, and was promoted by Boston to be pitching coach of the Class A-Advanced Salem Red Sox in 2018. In January 2020, Carter was named pitching coach of the Double-A Portland Sea Dogs.

In 2023, Carter was named pitching coach of the Atlanta Braves rookie-level affiliate FCL Braves. In 2026, he was promoted to the Triple-A Gwinnett Stripers pitching coach role.

== Personal life ==
Carter and his family reside in Bradenton, Florida. He and his wife Maeve have three children.
