= Joe Kennedy (baseball) =

American baseball pitcher (1979-2007)

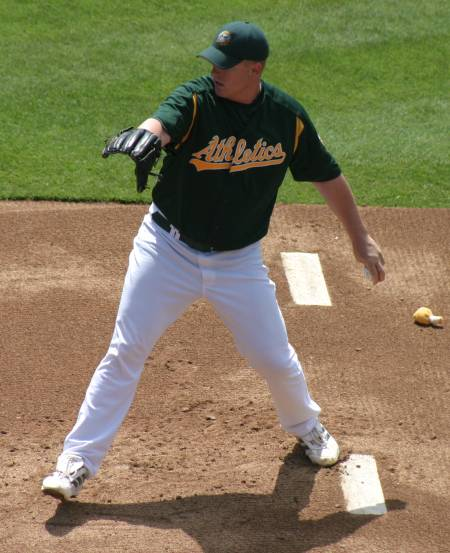
- Pitcher
- Born: May 24, 1979; La Mesa, California, U.S.
- Died: November 23, 2007 (aged 28); Brandon, Florida, U.S.
- Batted: Right Threw: Left

MLB debut
- June 6, 2001, for the Tampa Bay Devil Rays

Last MLB appearance
- September 29, 2007, for the Toronto Blue Jays

MLB statistics
- Win–loss record: 43–61
- Earned run average: 4.79
- Strikeouts: 558
- Stats at Baseball Reference

Teams
- Tampa Bay Devil Rays (2001–2003); Colorado Rockies (2004–2005); Oakland Athletics (2005–2007); Arizona Diamondbacks (2007); Toronto Blue Jays (2007)

Joseph Darley Kennedy (May 24, 1979 – November 23, 2007) was an American Major League Baseball left-handed pitcher. He pitched from 2001 to 2007 for the Tampa Bay Devil Rays, Colorado Rockies, Oakland Athletics, Arizona Diamondbacks, and the Toronto Blue Jays.

== Early life ==
Kennedy was born in La Mesa, California, to John and Holly Kennedy. He had an older brother, John Kennedy Jr., and a younger sister, Bettianne Kennedy. Kennedy played Little League in El Cajon, California. He was a member of the 1991 El Cajon American Little League team that won the Southern California Little League championship. The team was eliminated after a first-round 3–1 loss to Kahulia East Maui in the West Region Tournament in San Bernardino. He graduated from El Cajon Valley High School, where he played baseball as well as basketball, volleyball and football, and attended Grossmont College before entering the major league draft.

== Professional career ==
Kennedy was drafted by the Tampa Bay Devil Rays in the eighth round (252nd overall) of the 1998 Major League Baseball draft. He made his major league debut on June 6, 2001 with the Devil Rays.

=== Tampa Bay Devil Rays ===
Kennedy made his Major League debut on June 6, 2001, becoming the first lefthander to start a game for the Devil Rays in 219 games. He finished 7–8 in 20 starts for the Devil Rays.

In his second season, he pitched in 30 starts going 8-11 while throwing 5 complete games for the Devil Rays. In 2003, he was named the Opening Day starter for the Devil Rays after having an abysmal spring training. He made 22 straight starts before being relegated to the bullpen after suffering an arm injury in 2003. He had pitched in 72 consecutive starts for the Devil Rays before being moved to the bullpen.

He recorded his first career save on September 10, 2003, against the Blue Jays, pitching three scoreless innings.

=== Colorado Rockies ===
Traded to the Colorado Rockies before the 2004 season, Kennedy became the first Rockies starter to have a sub 4.00 earned run average, setting a franchise record with a 3.66 ERA while going 9-7 for the Rockies. In 2005, Kennedy struggled as a starter for the Rockies, going 4–8 with a 7.04 ERA.

=== Oakland Athletics ===
On June 5, 2005, the A's showed interest in Kennedy. On July 13 of that year, Kennedy, along with pitcher Jay Witasick, was traded by the Rockies to the Oakland Athletics for outfielder Eric Byrnes and minor league infield prospect Omar Quintanilla. Kennedy pitched in the bullpen for Oakland before being pressed into the starter role in September when Rich Harden was injured. Kennedy went 1-5 as a starter for Oakland, and finished the year with a 4–5 record and a 4.70 ERA in the American League. Kennedy pitched well in a middle relief role in Oakland's bullpen in 2006, with a record of 4-1 and a 2.31 ERA. Unfortunately, his role was diminished as he missed three months with shoulder and biceps injuries. Despite struggling in spring training with an ERA above 11.00, Kennedy was named the fifth starter for the Athletics at the start of the 2007 season. Through June 2 he compiled a 1–4 record with a 3.30 ERA in 62 2/3 innings. He was ineffective afterwards and was placed on waivers.

=== Arizona Diamondbacks ===
Kennedy was claimed by the Arizona Diamondbacks on August 4 after being placed on waivers by the Athletics. He was designated for assignment on August 15 after allowing 7 runs in 3 games and was released by the Diamondbacks.

=== Toronto Blue Jays ===
He signed a minor league contract with the Toronto Blue Jays on August 28 and was called up to the major league team on September 2. He pitched in nine games, all in relief, for the Blue Jays in the final month of the season and went 1–0 with a 5.14 ERA. He became a free agent after the season.

== Scouting ==
Kennedy had a bevy of pitches at his disposal, featuring a 92-96 MPH four-seam fastball, a 90-92 MPH two-seam fastball, a slow curve, a diving slider and, possibly his second-best pitch after his fastball, a deceptive changeup. His powerful delivery was at the 3/4-sidearm slot, which made his pitches particularly hard for left-handed batters to pick up. He was also very effective against right-handed batters. After struggling a little as a spot-starter for the Athletics, he pitched well in the bullpen in 2006, holding his opponents to a .254 batting average and going 4–1 with a 2.31 ERA.

== Death ==
On November 23, 2007, Kennedy was in Florida to be the best man at the wedding of a friend. He woke up in the middle of the night and collapsed at the home of his in-laws. He was taken to HCA Florida Brandon Hospital in Brandon, where he was pronounced dead. At the time of Kennedy's death, he was married to Jami Kennedy, who was pregnant with their second child (the couple's first son was one year old at the time.) On January 15, 2008, it was announced by the medical examiner that Kennedy had died of hypertensive heart disease with degeneration of the mitral valve.

After Kennedy's death, Frank Thomas, with whom Kennedy was teammates on the Oakland Athletics and the Toronto Blue Jays, kept Kennedy's glove in his locker for the entirety of the 2008 season.

== See also ==
- List of baseball players who died during their careers

Preceded by Tanyon Sturtze	Tampa Bay Devil Rays Opening Day; Starting pitcher 2003	Succeeded by Víctor Zambrano
