= Jesús Colomé =

Dominican baseball player (born 1977)

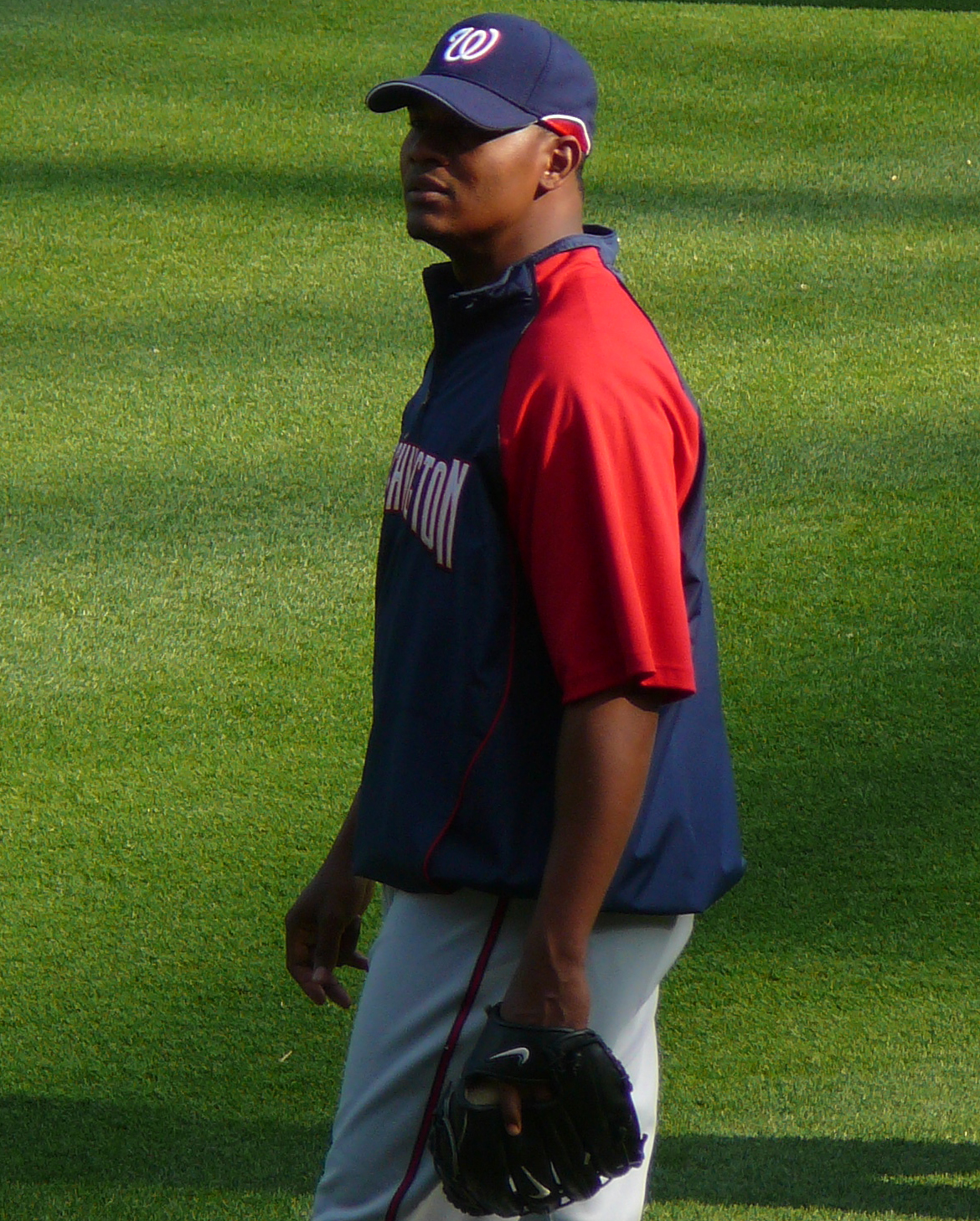
- Colomé with the Nationals in 2008
- Relief pitcher
- Born: December 23, 1977 (age 48); San Pedro de Macorís, Dominican Republic
- Batted: Right Threw: Right

MLB debut
- June 21, 2001, for the Tampa Bay Devil Rays

Last MLB appearance
- May 30, 2010, for the Seattle Mariners

MLB statistics
- Win–loss record: 19–27
- Earned run average: 4.69
- Strikeouts: 330
- Stats at Baseball Reference

Teams
- Tampa Bay Devil Rays (2001–2006); Washington Nationals (2007–2009); Milwaukee Brewers (2009); Seattle Mariners (2010)

Jesús Colomé de la Cruz (born December 23, 1977) is a Dominican former professional baseball relief pitcher. He played for the Tampa Bay Devil Rays, Washington Nationals, Milwaukee Brewers and Seattle Mariners of Major League Baseball (MLB).

== Professional career ==
=== Oakland Athletics ===
Jesús Colomé was signed as a non-drafted free agent by the Oakland Athletics at age 18, in 1996. He had made it to Double-A as a starting pitcher when, on July 28, 2000, he was traded to the Tampa Bay Devil Rays for Todd Belitz and Jim Mecir.

=== Tampa Bay Devil Rays ===
The Devil Rays converted him to a relief pitcher, and he made his major league debut with them on June 21, 2001. He finished with a 3.33 ERA. Colomé was one of the only pitchers to throw over 100 mph, but he had bad control. The next season, he posted an 8.27 ERA (the highest of his career). He returned to his old form in 2004, in 2003 he struck out a career high 69 batters.

On August 26, 2005, Colomé was involved in a serious car accident in the Dominican Republic. Two months later, he was released by the Devil Rays.

=== New York Yankees ===
Colomé signed a minor league contract with the New York Yankees in 2006. At the end of the season, spent entirely in the minors, he opted for free agency.

=== Washington Nationals ===
Colomé then signed with the Washington Nationals. He came north with the Nationals following the spring season and started off pitching well. By Memorial Day he was 4–0, and was fifth in the league with 26 appearances, posting a 2.20 ERA and prompting MLB writer Bill Ladson to write, "Jesús Colomé is the Nationals' best reliever, and one could argue that he should be considered for the All-Star Game." Ladson credited Colome's resurgence in his reliance on pitches other than his once dominating fastball.

On December 10, 2008, he was released by the Nationals. He was re-signed by the Nationals to a minor league contract on January 15, 2009. He competed for a spot on the Nationals' roster in spring training, but was sent to the minor leagues on April 4, 2009.

=== Milwaukee Brewers ===
In July 2009, the Nationals designated him for assignment and he was picked up by the Milwaukee Brewers and signed to a minor league contract. On September 6, he was released by the Brewers.

=== Seattle Mariners ===
On February 10, 2010, Colome signed a minor league contract with the Seattle Mariners. Colomé and Kanekoa Texeira were designated for assignment on May 31, 2010, to make room for Sean White and Garrett Olson.

=== Los Angeles Dodgers ===
He was signed to a minor league contract by the Los Angeles Dodgers on June 23, 2010, and assigned to the AAA Albuquerque Isotopes. He only appeared in 3 games for the Isotopes before he was released.

=== Texas Rangers ===
On August 15, 2010, he, along with Willy Taveras, signed a minor league deal with the Texas Rangers, and was assigned to Triple-A Oklahoma City.

=== Colorado Rockies ===
Colomé signed a minor league deal with the Rockies in 2011. He only appeared in 10 games for their AAA affiliate team.

=== Sultanes de Monterrey ===
He played for the Sultanes de Monterrey in the Mexican League in 2012.

=== Joplin Blasters ===
Colome signed with the Joplin Blasters of the American Association of Independent Professional Baseball and played for them during the 2015 season.

== Personal life ==
His nephew is Álex Colomé.
