= 2001 Detroit Tigers season =

Major League Baseball season

2001 Detroit Tigers
- League: American League
- Division: Central
- Ballpark: Comerica Park
- City: Detroit
- Record: 66–96 (.407)
- Divisional place: 4th
- Owners: Mike Ilitch
- General managers: Randy Smith
- Managers: Phil Garner
- Television: WKBD (Frank Beckmann, Al Kaline); FSN Detroit (Kirk Gibson, Josh Lewin)
- Radio: WXYT (AM) (Ernie Harwell, Jim Price, Dan Dickerson)

The 2001 Detroit Tigers season was the team's 101st season and its second at Comerica Park. The Detroit Tigers failed to win the American League Central and finished with a 66–96 record, missing the playoffs for the 14th consecutive season.

== Offseason ==
- December 5, 2000: Randall Simon was signed as a free agent with the Detroit Tigers.

== Regular season ==
=== Season standings ===
AL Central
Team	W	L	Pct.	GB	Home	Road
Cleveland Indians	91	71	.562	—	44‍–‍36	47‍–‍35
Minnesota Twins	85	77	.525	6	47‍–‍34	38‍–‍43
Chicago White Sox	83	79	.512	8	46‍–‍35	37‍–‍44
Detroit Tigers	66	96	.407	25	37‍–‍44	29‍–‍52
Kansas City Royals	65	97	.401	26	35‍–‍46	30‍–‍51

=== Record vs. opponents ===
2001 American League record Source: MLB Standings Grid – 2001
Team	ANA	BAL	BOS	CWS	CLE	DET	KC	MIN	NYY	OAK	SEA	TB	TEX	TOR	NL
Anaheim	—	4–5	4–3	6–3	5–4	5–4	5–4	3–6	4–3	6–14	4–15	7–2	7–12	5–4	10–8
Baltimore	5–4	—	9–10	3–4	1–5	4–2	5–2	3–3	5–13–1	2–7	1–8	10–9	2–7	7–12	6–12
Boston	3–4	10–9	—	3–3	3–6	4–5	3–3	3–3	5–13	4–5	3–6	14–5	5–2	12–7	10–8
Chicago	3–6	4–3	3–3	—	10–9	13–6	14–5	5–14	1–5	1–8	2–7	5–2	7–2	3–3	12–6
Cleveland	4–5	5–1	6–3	9–10	—	13–6	11–8	14–5	4–5	4–3	2–5	5–1	5–4	2–4	7–11
Detroit	4–5	2–4	5–4	6–13	6–13	—	8–11	4–15	4–5	1–6	2–5	4–2	8–1	2–4	10–8
Kansas City	4–5	2–5	3–3	5–14	8–11	11–8	—	6–13	0–6	3–6	3–6	4–2	4–5	4–3	8–10
Minnesota	6–3	3–3	3–3	14–5	5–14	15–4	13–6	—	4–2	5–4	1–8	1–6	4–5	2–5	9–9
New York	3–4	13–5–1	13–5	5–1	5–4	5–4	6–0	2–4	—	3–6	3–6	13–6	3–4	11–8	10–8
Oakland	14–6	7–2	5–4	8–1	3–4	6–1	6–3	4–5	6–3	—	9–10	7–2	9–10	6–3	12–6
Seattle	15–4	8–1	6–3	7–2	5–2	5–2	6–3	8–1	6–3	10–9	—	7–2	15–5	6–3	12–6
Tampa Bay	2–7	9–10	5–14	2–5	1–5	2–4	2–4	6–1	6–13	2–7	2–7	—	4–5	9–10	10–8
Texas	12–7	7–2	2–5	2–7	4–5	1–8	5–4	5–4	4–3	10–9	5–15	5–4	—	3–6	8–10
Toronto	4–5	12–7	7–12	3–3	4–2	4–2	3–4	5–2	8–11	3–6	3–6	10–9	6–3	—	8–10

=== Opening Day lineup ===
Roger Cedeño, rf

Damion Easley, 2b

Bobby Higginson, lf

Tony Clark, 1b

Billy McMillon, dh

Deivi Cruz, ss

Juan Encarnación, cf

Shane Halter, 3b

Brandon Inge, c

Jeff Weaver, p

=== Notable transactions ===
- July 28, 2001: Todd Jones was traded by the Detroit Tigers to the Minnesota Twins for Mark Redman.

=== Roster ===
2001 Detroit Tigers
Roster
Pitchers: 14 Matt Anderson; 26 Adam Bernero; 24 Willie Blair; 45 Dave Borkowski; 24 Jermaine Clark; 24 Nate Cornejo; 41 Chris Holt; 59 Todd Jones; 42 José Lima; 58 Matt Miller; 30 Dave Mlicki; 38 Brian Moehler; 18 Heath Murray; 27 C. J. Nitkowski; 28 Danny Patterson; 40 Matt Perisho; 57 Adam Pettyjohn; 30 Luis Pineda; 55 Mark Redman; 55,22 Víctor Santos; 37 Steve Sparks; 36 Jeff Weaver	Catchers: 15 Javier Cardona; 25 Robert Fick; 12 Brandon Inge; 49 Mike Rivera; Infielders: 44 Tony Clark; 8 Deivi Cruz; 9 Damion Easley; 17 Shane Halter; 20 Ryan Jackson; 39 José Macías; 50 Eric Munson; 43 Jarrod Patterson; 49,71 Pedro Santana; 35 Randall Simon	Outfielders: 19 Roger Cedeño; 34 Juan Encarnación; 4 Bobby Higginson; 29 Wendell Magee; 43 Billy McMillon; 43 Chris Wakeland; Other batters: 24 Jermaine Clark; 7 Dean Palmer	Manager: 33 Phil Garner; Coaches: 48 Bill Madlock (Hitting); 32 Doug Mansolino (Bench); 56 Ed Ott (Bullpen); 13 Lance Parrish (Third Base); 10 Juan Samuel (First Base); 31 Dan Warthen (Pitching)

=== Game log ===
Legend
Tigers win	Tigers loss	Game postponed

2001 Game Log
April (8–15) – home (5–9) – road (3–6)

#	Date	Opponent	Score	Win	Loss	Save	Time	Att.	Record	Box
1	April 3	Twins	3–2	Radke (1–0)	Weaver (0–1)	Wells (1)	2:32	40,104	0–1	box
2	April 5	Twins	9–5 (10)	Guardado (1–0)	Jones (0–1)		3:12	20,836	0–2	box
3	April 6	@ White Sox	10–9 (10)	Patterson (1–0)	Foulke (0–1)	Jones (1)	3:38	43,954	1–2	box
4	April 7	@ White Sox	5–3	Holt (1–0)	Buehrle (0–1)	Jones (2)	2:31	20,264	2–2	box
5	April 8	@ White Sox	5–3	Weaver (1–1)	Wells (1–1)	Jones (3)	2:49	19,887	3–2	box
6	April 9	@ Twins	11–5	Radke (2–0)	Sparks (0–1)		3:01	46,101	3–3	box
7	April 10	@ Twins	8–2	Milton (1–0)	Perisho (0–1)		2:43	9,130	3–4	box
8	April 11	@ Twins	12–1	Mays (2–0)	Mlicki (0–1)		2:47	11,149	3–5	box
9	April 12	Indians	5–3	Colón (1–1)	Holt (1–1)	Wickman (3)	3:15	15,639	3–6	box
10	April 13	Indians	9–8	Sabathia (1–0)	Weaver (1–2)	Shuey (1)	3:27	20,334	3–7	box
11	April 14	Indians	1–0	Sparks (1–1)	Finley (1–2)		2:03	23,119	4–7	box
–	April 15	Indians	Postponed (rain) Rescheduled for July 28							
12	April 17	White Sox	7–4	Anderson (1–0)	Wunsch (0–1)	Jones (4)	2:39	13,068	5–7	box
13	April 18	White Sox	6–4	Buehrle (1–2)	Holt (1–2)	Foulke (4)	2:49	13,180	5–8	box
14	April 19	White Sox	3–1	Wells (2–2)	Weaver (1–3)		2:34	14,571	5–9	box
15	April 20	@ Indians	5–4	Wickman (1–0)	Nitkowski (0–1)		3:19	33,127	5–10	box
16	April 21	@ Indians	5–4 (11)	Reed (1–1)	Jones (0–2)		3:27	42,068	5–11	box
17	April 22	@ Indians	11–3	Burba (2–1)	Mlicki (0–2)		3:02	34,125	5–12	box
18	April 24	Orioles	8–3	Hentgen (1–2)	Weaver (1–4)		2:41	14,101	5–13	box
19	April 25	Orioles	6–4	Roberts (3–0)	Sparks (2–0)	Kohlmeier (4)	2:48	18,919	5–14	box
20	April 26	Orioles	8–2	Holt (2–2)	Johnson (1–2)		2:37	18,824	6–14	box
21	April 27	Devil Rays	4–2	Mlicki (1–2)	Rupe (1–3)	Jones (5)	2:49	16,458	7–14	box
22	April 28	Devil Rays	7–3	Judd (1–0)	Perisho (0–2)		3:03	18,666	7–15	box
23	April 29	Devil Rays	6–1	Weaver (2–4)	Lopez (3–2)		2:27	16,769	8–15	box

May (14–13) – home (6–6) – road (8–7)

#	Date	Opponent	Score	Win	Loss	Save	Time	Att.	Record	Box
24	May 1	@ Rangers	6–3 (10)	Patterson (2–0)	Zimmerman (1–2)	Jones (6)	3:01	25,638	9–15	box
25	May 2	@ Rangers	8–4	Holt (3–2)	Oliver (4–1)	Anderson (1)	3:00	33,825	10–15	box
26	May 3	@ Rangers	9–4	Mlicki (2–2)	Helling (1–5)		2:48	34,051	11–15	box
27	May 4	@ Angels	7–5	Weber (1–0)	Murray (0–1)	Percival (7)	3:16	36,690	11–16	box
28	May 5	@ Angels	11–2	Weaver (3–4)	Ortiz (3–3)		2:49	24,758	12–16	box
29	May 6	@ Angels	3–2	Levine (1–1)	Patterson (2–1)		2:56	29,353	12–17	box
30	May 8	Rangers	5–4	Jones (1–2)	Crabtree (0–1)		3:36	21,662	13–17	box
31	May 9	Rangers	3–2	Mlicki (3–2)	Davis (2–3)	Jones (7)	2:55	17,933	14–17	box
32	May 10	Rangers	6–5	Patterson (3–1)	Zimmerman (1–3)	Jones (8)	2:56	25,306	15–17	box
33	May 11	Angels	7–6	Jones (2–2)	Lukasiewicz (0–1)		4:17	18,811	16–17	box
34	May 12	Angels	4–1	Anderson (2–0)	Hasegawa (1–3)		2:53	22,133	17–17	box
35	May 13	Angels	14–2	Washburn (2–4)	Holt (3–3)		3:16	20,012	17–18	box
36	May 15	@ Orioles	11–3	Ponson (1–3)	Mlicki (3–3)		3:07	33,853	17–19	box
37	May 16	@ Orioles	3–2	Hentgen (2–3)	Weaver (3–5)	Ryan (1)	2:24	27,722	17–20	box
38	May 17	@ Orioles	7–5	Sparks (2–2)	Roberts (4–3)	Jones (9)	2:52	27,508	18–20	box
39	May 18	@ Devil Rays	18–2	Santos (1–0)	Sturtze (1–3)		3:00	12,131	19–20	box
40	May 19	@ Devil Rays	10–5	Holt (4–3)	Lopez (3–4)	Patterson (1)	2:59	13,304	20–20	box
41	May 20	@ Devil Rays	10–2	Wilson (2–5)	Mlicki (3–4)		2:39	13,512	20–21	box
42	May 22	@ Indians	3–0	Weaver (4–5)	Colón (4–4)	Jones (10)	3:00	35,362	21–21	box
43	May 23	@ Indians	4–3	Wickman (2–0)	Borkowski (0–1)		3:11	36,804	21–22	box
44	May 24	@ Indians	8–5	Burba (7–2)	Santos (1–1)	Wickman (8)	3:10	36,295	21–23	box
45	May 25	White Sox	8–4	Lowe (2–0)	Jones (2–3)		3:08	21,053	21–24	box
46	May 26	White Sox	8–0	Buehrle (2–3)	Mlicki (3–5)		2:39	25,881	21–25	box
47	May 27	White Sox	3–2	Barceló (1–0)	Patterson (3–2)	Lowe (1)	3:55	17,355	21–26	box
48	May 28	Indians	12–6	Sparks (3–2)	Finley (4–4)		2:56	24,615	22–26	box
49	May 29	Indians	6–4	Shuey (4–1)	Murray (0–2)	Wickman (10)	3:20	21,404	22–27	box
50	May 30	Indians	8–4	Wright (1–0)	Holt (4–4)	Wickman (11)	3:31	18,359	22–28	box
–	May 31	@ White Sox	Postponed (rain) Rescheduled for September 4							

June (10–17) – home (8–5) – road (2–12)

#	Date	Opponent	Score	Win	Loss	Save	Time	Att.	Record	Box
51	June 1	@ White Sox	3–0	Buehrle (3–3)	Mlicki (3–6)	Foulke (10)	2:34	19,840	22–29	box
52	June 2	@ White Sox	5–3	Wells (4–5)	Weaver (4–6)	Foulke (11)	2:30	23,915	22–30	box
53	June 3	@ White Sox	9–6 (10)	Howry (3–2)	Jones (2–4)		3:17	19,446	22–31	box
54	June 5	@ Red Sox	4–3 (18)	Wakefield (3–0)	Borkowski (0–2)		5:52	32,814	22–32	box
55	June 6	@ Red Sox	7–3	Mlicki (4–6)	Castillo (5–4)	Anderson (2)	3:14	32,794	23–32	box
56	June 7	@ Red Sox	8–1	Wakefield (4–0)	Santos (1–2)	Arrojo (5)	2:59	32,132	23–33	box
57	June 8	Brewers	9–4	Weaver (5–6)	Rigdon (3–4)		3:23	27,770	24–33	box
58	June 9	Brewers	6–5	Anderson (3–0)	Leskanic (2–3)		2:52	26,276	25–33	box
59	June 10	Brewers	8–3	Wright (5–4)	Holt (4–5)		2:51	23,070	25–34	box
60	June 12	Pirates	13–3	Ritchie (1–8)	Mlicki (4–7)		2:41	15,919	25–35	box
61	June 13	Pirates	6–3	Weaver (6–6)	Beimel (2–2)	Anderson (3)	3:04	17,639	26–35	box
62	June 14	Pirates	6–4	Sparks (4–2)	Arroyo (3–5)	Anderson (4)	2:45	17,305	27–35	box
63	June 15	@ Diamondbacks	5–2	Holt (5–5)	Brohawn (1–3)	Anderson (5)	2:59	31,683	28–35	box
64	June 16	@ Diamondbacks	3–1	Ellis (6–2)	Blair (0–1)	Prinz (6)	2:44	35,028	28–36	box
65	June 17	@ Diamondbacks	8–3	Schilling (11–2)	Mlicki (4–8)		2:34	39,760	28–37	box
66	June 18	Yankees	10–1	Clemens (9–1)	Weaver (6–7)		3:03	29,365	28–38	box
67	June 19	Yankees	7–1	Sparks (5–2)	Keisler (1–2)		2:20	24,171	29–38	box
68	June 20	Yankees	5–2	Holt (6–5)	Hernández (0–1)	Anderson (6)	3:18	23,618	30–38	box
–	June 21	Yankees	Postponed (rain) Rescheduled for July 18							
69	June 22	Twins	5–4	Jones (3–4)	Wells (5–3)		3:01	28,282	31–38	box
70	June 23	Twins	10–9	Patterson (4–2)	Carrasco (3–3)	Jones (11)	3:18	28,935	32–38	box
71	June 24	Twins	14–5	Milton (8–3)	Sparks (5–3)		3:04	27,024	32–39	box
72	June 25	Twins	6–3	Mays (9–5)	Holt (6–6)	Hawkins (17)	2:43	22,302	32–40	box
73	June 26	@ Royals	12–5	Reichert (7–6)	Blair (0–2)		2:39	13,966	32–41	box
74	June 27	@ Royals	5–4	Hernández (2–2)	Jones (3–5)		2:50	15,207	32–42	box
75	June 28	@ Royals	9–2	Durbin (6–6)	Weaver (6–8)		2:39	22,239	32–43	box
76	June 29	@ Twins	3–2	Wells (6–3)	Murray (0–3)	Hawkins (19)	2:41	21,312	32–44	box
77	June 30	@ Twins	3–2	Mays (10–5)	Holt (6–6)	Guardado (3)	2:12	34,460	32–45	box

July (14–13) – home (9–5) – road (5–8)

#	Date	Opponent	Score	Win	Loss	Save	Time	Att.	Record	Box
78	July 1	@ Twins	8–3	Santana (1–0)	Blair (0–3)		2:41	21,031	32–46	box
79	July 3	Royals	8–4	Lima (2–2)	Durbin (6–7)		2:55	23,824	33–46	box
80	July 4	Royals	6–4	Weaver (7–8)	Bailey (1–1)	Anderson (7)	3:22	27,115	34–46	box
81	July 5	Royals	7–1	Sparks (6–3)	Wilson (2–1)		2:20	22,281	35–46	box
82	July 6	Cubs	15–9	Heredia (2–0)	Nitkowski (0–2)		3:49	39,906	35–47	box
83	July 7	Cubs	10–6	Lieber (11–4)	Blair (0–4)		3:09	39,697	35–48	box
84	July 8	Cubs	9–6	Jones (4–5)	Heredia (2–1)	Anderson (8)	2:59	38,729	36–48	box
85	July 12	@ Cardinals	7–5	Weaver (8–8)	Kile (9–7)	Anderson (9)	3:14	35,554	37–48	box
86	July 13	@ Cardinals	4–1	Sparks (7–3)	Matthews (3–4)		2:32	38,667	38–48	box
87	July 14	@ Cardinals	3–2	Morris (11–5)	Lima (2–3)	Kline (3)	2:36	47,176	38–49	box
88	July 15	@ Reds	8–5	Blair (1–4)	Nichting (0–3)	Anderson (10)	3:07	24,719	39–49	box
89	July 16	@ Reds	9–1	Davis (2–1)	Pettyjohn (0–1)		2:28	19,757	39–50	box
90	July 17	@ Reds	3–1	Weaver (9–8)	Reitsma (4–9)	Anderson (11)	2:58	19,933	40–50	box
91	July 18	Yankees	8–5	Clemens (13–1)	Sparks (7–4)	Rivera (32)	2:49	14,800	40–51	box
92	July 18	Yankees	12–4	Santos (2–2)	Lilly (3–3)		3:11	33,216	41–51	box
93	July 19	Yankees	11–2	Lima (3–3)	Pettitte (9–6)		2:38	35,320	42–51	box
94	July 20	@ Indians	7–3	Holt (7–7)	Westbrook (2–2)		3:03	42,520	43–51	box
95	July 21	@ Indians	8–4	Nagy (4–3)	Pettyjohn (0–2)		2:31	42,316	43–52	box
96	July 22	@ Indians	6–3	Colón (9–7)	Weaver (9–9)		3:07	42,462	43–53	box
97	July 24	@ Yankees	5–3	Pettitte (10–6)	Sparks (7–5)	Rivera (33)	2:58	34,519	43–54	box
98	July 25	@ Yankees	4–2	Witasick (7–2)	Lima (3–4)	Rivera (34)	2:40	34,480	43–55	box
99	July 26	@ Yankees	14–8	Mendoza (7–2)	Holt (7–8)		3:13	45,221	43–56	box
100	July 27	Indians	7–4	Colón (10–7)	Pettyjohn (0–3)	Wickman (18)	2:57	39,504	43–57	box
101	July 28	Indians	6–4	Báez (1–0)	Murray (0–4)	Wickman (19)	3:09	27,643	43–58	box
102	July 28	Indians	4–2	Weaver (10–9)	Woodard (1–1)	Anderson (12)	2:44	34,916	44–58	box
103	July 29	Indians	8–3	Sparks (8–5)	Burba (9–8)		2:38	32,918	45–58	box
104	July 31	Mariners	4–2	Lima (4–4)	Sele (12–3)	Anderson (13)	2:24	30,022	46–58	box

August (9–20) – home (4–11) – road (5–9)

#	Date	Opponent	Score	Win	Loss	Save	Time	Att.	Record	Box
105	August 1	Mariners	7–1	Abbott (11–2)	Holt (7–9)		3:01	23,847	46–59	box
106	August 2	Mariners	2–1	Piñeiro (2–0)	Pettyjohn (0–4)	Sasaki (35)	2:23	27,097	46–60	box
107	August 3	Athletics	2–1	Hudson (13–6)	Weaver (10–10)		2:25	30,071	46–61	box
108	August 4	Athletics	10–1	Zito (7–7)	Sparks (8–6)		2:29	28,331	46–62	box
109	August 5	Athletics	4–1	Lidle (6–5)	Lima (4–5)	Isringhausen (20)	2:18	26,626	46–63	box
110	August 6	Athletics	6–3	Vizcaíno (1–0)	Patterson (4–3)	Isringhausen (21)	3:06	21,830	46–64	box
111	August 7	@ Rangers	7–3	Perisho (1–2)	Venafro (4–3)		2:44	26,621	47–64	box
112	August 8	@ Rangers	19–6	Patterson (5–3)	Venafro (4–4)		3:26	30,016	48–64	box
113	August 9	@ Rangers	7–3	Helling (9–9)	Sparks (8–7)		3:08	27,652	48–65	box
114	August 10	@ Royals	7–3	Byrd (5–5)	Weaver (10–11)	Stein (1)	2:38	22,107	48–66	box
115	August 11	@ Royals	4–1	George (1–3)	Lima (4–6)	Hernández (21)	2:04	26,943	48–67	box
116	August 12	@ Royals	6–4	Suppan (6–10)	Pettyjohn (0–5)	Hernández (22)	2:31	17,811	48–68	box
117	August 14	Angels	7–1	Washburn (10–6)	Cornejo (0–1)		2:52	24,082	48–69	box
118	August 15	Angels	5–1	Perisho (2–2)	Holtz (0–1)		2:33	20,853	49–69	box
119	August 16	Angels	4–2	Schoeneweis (10–8)	Weaver (10–12)	Percival (34)	2:37	22,141	49–70	box
120	August 17	Royals	4–2	Lima (5–6)	George (1–4)	Anderson (14)	2:12	30,214	50–70	box
121	August 18	Royals	8–4	Suppan (7–10)	Nitkowski (0–3)		2:50	31,897	50–71	box
122	August 19	Royals	4–3	Cornejo (1–1)	Durbin (7–12)	Anderson (15)	2:17	26,898	51–71	box
123	August 20	@ Mariners	4–1	Sparks (9–7)	García (15–5)		2:22	45,972	52–71	box
124	August 21	@ Mariners	4–1	Sele (13–4)	Weaver (10–13)	Sasaki (40)	2:20	45,036	52–72	box
125	August 22	@ Mariners	16–1	Abbott (13–3)	Lima (5–7)		2:57	45,814	52–73	box
126	August 23	@ Mariners	5–1	Piñeiro (3–0)	Redman (2–5)		3:10	45,063	52–74	box
127	August 24	@ Athletics	8–4	Cornejo (2–1)	Hudson (14–7)		3:20	41,646	53–74	box
128	August 25	@ Athletics	6–1	Zito (10–8)	Sparks (9–8)		2:45	24,236	53–75	box
129	August 26	@ Athletics	7–6	Tam (2–3)	Perisho (2–3)	Isringhausen (26)	3:13	27,915	53–76	box
130	August 28	White Sox	8–6	Embree (1–3)	Patterson (5–4)	Howry (5)	2:59	19,129	53–77	box
131	August 29	White Sox	8–3	Glover (4–1)	Redman (2–6)		3:19	21,998	53–78	box
132	August 30	White Sox	3–1	Cornejo (3–1)	Buehrle (12–7)	Anderson (16)	2:04	24,364	54–78	box
133	August 31	@ Blue Jays	4–3	Sparks (10–8)	Borbón (2–4)	Anderson (17)	2:49	22,383	55–78	box

September (9–14) – home (3–4) – road (6–10)

#	Date	Opponent	Score	Win	Loss	Save	Time	Att.	Record	Box
134	September 1	@ Blue Jays	3–1	Lyon (4–2)	Weaver (10–14)	Plesac (1)	2:13	22,052	55–79	box
135	September 2	@ Blue Jays	11–0	Loaiza (10–11)	Lima (5–8)		2:39	24,146	55–80	box
136	September 4	@ White Sox	10–1	Buehrle (13–7)	Cornejo (3–2)		2:41	N/A	55–81	box
137	September 4	@ White Sox	4–0	Lowe (7–4)	Pettyjohn (0–6)		2:31	13,265	55–82	box
138	September 5	@ White Sox	5–3	Wright (3–2)	Sparks (10–9)	Foulke (37)	2:45	14,576	55–83	box
139	September 6	@ White Sox	6–2	Weaver (11–14)	Garland (6–6)		3:27	13,602	56–83	box
140	September 7	Blue Jays	2–1	Lyon (5–2)	Lima (5–9)	Koch (31)	2:20	28,083	56–84	box
141	September 8	Blue Jays	4–3	Murray (1–4)	Halladay (3–2)	Anderson (18)	2:45	29,158	57–84	box
142	September 9	Blue Jays	6–3	Carpenter (10–11)	Cornejo (3–3)	Guardado (6)	2:56	24,652	57–85	box
143	September 10	Twins	3–2	Mays (15–13)	Pineda (0–1)		2:48	19,456	57–86	box
–	September 11	Twins	Postponed (9/11 attack) Rescheduled for October 2							
–	September 12	Twins	Postponed (9/11 attack) Rescheduled for October 3							
–	September 13	Twins	Postponed (9/11 attack) Rescheduled for October 4							
–	September 14	Royals	Postponed (9/11 attack) Rescheduled for October 5							
–	September 15	Royals	Postponed (9/11 attack) Rescheduled for October 6							
–	September 16	Royals	Postponed (9/11 attack) Rescheduled for October 7							
144	September 18	@ Twins	8–3	Radke (13–9)	Weaver (11–15)		2:48	10,878	57–87	box
145	September 19	@ Twins	6–2	Sparks (11–9)	Milton (14–6)		2:28	10,157	58–87	box
146	September 20	@ Twins	3–0	Mays (16–13)	Lima (5–10)		2:07	9,754	58–88	box
147	September 21	@ Red Sox	5–2	Fossum (2–1)	Murray (1–5)	Urbina (21)	2:33	30,905	58–89	box
148	September 22	@ Red Sox	4–3	Pettyjohn (1–6)	Arrojo (5–4)	Anderson (19)	3:05	30,871	59–89	box
149	September 23	@ Red Sox	12–6	Weaver (12–15)	Nomo (12–9)		3:04	31,333	60–89	box
150	September 24	@ Royals	4–2	Sparks (12–9)	Suppan (9–13)	Anderson (20)	2:34	12,152	61–89	box
151	September 25	@ Royals	6–4	Lima (6–10)	George (4–6)	Anderson (21)	2:47	11,160	62–89	box
152	September 26	@ Royals	8–6	Stein (6–8)	Murray (1–6)	Hernández (25)	3:05	11,097	62–90	box
153	September 27	@ Royals	8–7	MacDougal (1–0)	Cornejo (3–4)	Hernández (26)	3:35	11,978	62–91	box
154	September 28	Red Sox	4–1	Weaver (13–15)	Nomo (12–10)	Anderson (22)	2:54	32,453	63–91	box
155	September 29	Red Sox	7–2	Sparks (13–9)	Kim (0–2)		2:25	30,089	64–91	box
156	September 30	Red Sox	8–5	Castillo (9–9)	Lima (6–11)	Urbina (23)	3:15	29,229	64–92	box

October (2–4) – home (2–4) – road (0–0)

#	Date	Opponent	Score	Win	Loss	Save	Time	Att.	Record	Box
157	October 2	Twins	5–0	Radke (14–11)	Murray (1–7)		2:20	11,941	64–93	box
158	October 3	Twins	9–5	Cornejo (4–4)	Fiore (0–1)		2:39	12,318	65–93	box
159	October 4	Twins	5–4	Carrasco (4–3)	Anderson (3–1)	Guardado (10)	2:44	15,454	65–94	box
–	October 5	Royals	Postponed (rain) Rescheduled for October 6							
160	October 6	Royals	8–3	Suppan (10–14)	Weaver (13–16)	Hernández (28)	2:50	N/A	65–95	box
161	October 6	Royals	2–1	Sparks (14–9)	George (4–8)		1:56	18,884	66–95	box
162	October 7	Royals	10–4	Stein (7–8)	Lima (6–12)		2:14	19,261	66–96	box

== Player stats ==
=== Batting ===
Note: G = Games played; AB = At bats; H = Hits; Avg. = Batting average; HR = Home runs; RBI = Runs batted in

Player	G	AB	H	Avg.	HR	RBI
Damion Easley	154	585	146	.250	11	65
Bobby Higginson	147	541	150	.277	17	71
Roger Cedeño	131	523	153	.293	6	48
José Macías	137	488	131	.268	8	51
Shane Halter	136	450	128	.284	12	65
Tony Clark	126	428	123	.287	16	75
Juan Encarnación	120	417	101	.242	12	52
Deivi Cruz	110	414	106	.256	7	52
Robert Fick	124	401	109	.272	19	61
Randall Simon	81	256	78	.305	6	37
Dean Palmer	57	216	48	.222	11	40
Wendell Magee	90	207	44	.213	5	17
Brandon Inge	79	189	34	.180	0	15
Ryan Jackson	79	118	25	.212	2	11
Javier Cardona	46	96	25	.260	1	10
Eric Munson	17	66	10	.152	1	6
Jarrod Patterson	13	41	11	.268	2	4
Chris Wakeland	10	36	9	.250	2	6
Billy McMillon	20	34	3	.088	1	4
Mike Rivera	4	12	4	.333	0	1
Jermaine Clark	3	0	0	----	0	0
Pedro Santana	1	0	0	----	0	0
Pitcher totals	162	19	1	.053	0	0
Team totals	162	5537	1439	.260	139	691

Note: Individual pitchers' batting statistics not included

=== Starting pitchers ===
Note: G = Games pitched; IP = Innings pitched; W = Wins; L = Losses; ERA = Earned run average; SO = Strikeouts

Player	G	IP	W	L	ERA	SO
Steve Sparks	35	232.0	14	9	3.65	116
Jeff Weaver	33	229.1	13	16	4.08	152
Chris Holt	30	151.1	7	9	5.77	80
José Lima	18	112.2	5	10	4.71	43
Dave Mlicki	15	81.0	4	8	7.33	48
Nate Cornejo	10	42.2	4	4	7.38	22
Mark Redman	2	9.0	0	2	6.00	4
Brian Moehler	1	8.0	0	0	3.38	2

=== Other pitchers ===
Note: G = Games pitched; IP = Innings pitched; W = Wins; L = Losses; ERA = Earned run average; SO = Strikeouts

Player	G	IP	W	L	ERA	SO
Víctor Santos	33	76.1	2	2	3.30	52
Adam Pettyjohn	16	65.0	1	6	5.82	40
Willie Blair	9	24.0	1	4	10.50	15

=== Relief pitchers ===
Note: G = Games pitched; IP = Innings pitched; W = Wins; L = Losses; SV = Saves; ERA = Earned run average; SO =Strikeouts

Player	G	IP	W	L	SV	ERA	SO
Matt Anderson	62	56.0	3	1	22	4.82	52
Danny Patterson	60	64.2	5	4	1	3.06	27
C.J. Nitkowski	56	45.1	0	3	0	5.56	38
Todd Jones	45	48.2	4	5	11	4.62	39
Heath Murray	40	63.1	1	7	0	6.54	42
Matt Perisho	30	39.1	2	3	0	5.72	19
Luis Pineda	16	18.1	0	1	0	4.91	13
Dave Borkowski	15	29.2	0	2	0	6.37	30
Matt Miller	13	9.2	0	0	0	7.45	6
Kevin Tolar	9	10.2	0	0	0	6.75	11
Adam Bernero	5	12.1	0	0	0	7.30	8
Team Pitching Totals	162	1429.1	66	96	34	5.01	859

== Farm system ==
Level	Team	League	Manager
AAA	Toledo Mud Hens	International League	Bruce Fields
AA	Erie SeaWolves	Eastern League	Luis Pujols
A	Lakeland Tigers	Florida State League	Kevin Bradshaw
A	West Michigan Whitecaps	Midwest League	Brent Gates
A-Short Season	Oneonta Tigers	New York–Penn League	Gary Green
Rookie	GCL Tigers	Gulf Coast League	Howard Bushong
