= 2001 Chicago White Sox season =

2001 Chicago White Sox
- League: American League
- Division: Central
- Ballpark: Comiskey Park
- City: Chicago
- Record: 83–79 (.512)
- Divisional place: 3rd
- Owners: Jerry Reinsdorf
- General managers: Kenny Williams
- Managers: Jerry Manuel
- Television: WGN-TV/WCIU-TV; FSN Chicago (Ken Harrelson, Darrin Jackson)
- Radio: WMVP (John Rooney, Ed Farmer)

The 2001 Chicago White Sox season was the White Sox's 102nd season, and their 101st in Major League Baseball. They finished with a record of 83–79, good enough for third place in the American League Central, 8 games behind the champion Cleveland Indians.

== Notable Transactions ==
- December 18, 2000: Sandy Alomar Jr. was signed as a free agent with the Chicago White Sox.
- January 14, 2001: Acquired David Wells and Matt DeWitt from the Toronto Blue Jays for Mike Sirotka, Brian Simmons, and Kevin Beirne.
- June 21, 2001: Signed Jose Canseco.

== Regular season ==
=== Season standings ===
AL Central
Team	W	L	Pct.	GB	Home	Road
Cleveland Indians	91	71	.562	—	44‍–‍36	47‍–‍35
Minnesota Twins	85	77	.525	6	47‍–‍34	38‍–‍43
Chicago White Sox	83	79	.512	8	46‍–‍35	37‍–‍44
Detroit Tigers	66	96	.407	25	37‍–‍44	29‍–‍52
Kansas City Royals	65	97	.401	26	35‍–‍46	30‍–‍51

=== Record vs. opponents ===
2001 American League record Source: MLB Standings Grid – 2001
Team	ANA	BAL	BOS	CWS	CLE	DET	KC	MIN	NYY	OAK	SEA	TB	TEX	TOR	NL
Anaheim	—	4–5	4–3	6–3	5–4	5–4	5–4	3–6	4–3	6–14	4–15	7–2	7–12	5–4	10–8
Baltimore	5–4	—	9–10	3–4	1–5	4–2	5–2	3–3	5–13–1	2–7	1–8	10–9	2–7	7–12	6–12
Boston	3–4	10–9	—	3–3	3–6	4–5	3–3	3–3	5–13	4–5	3–6	14–5	5–2	12–7	10–8
Chicago	3–6	4–3	3–3	—	10–9	13–6	14–5	5–14	1–5	1–8	2–7	5–2	7–2	3–3	12–6
Cleveland	4–5	5–1	6–3	9–10	—	13–6	11–8	14–5	4–5	4–3	2–5	5–1	5–4	2–4	7–11
Detroit	4–5	2–4	5–4	6–13	6–13	—	8–11	4–15	4–5	1–6	2–5	4–2	8–1	2–4	10–8
Kansas City	4–5	2–5	3–3	5–14	8–11	11–8	—	6–13	0–6	3–6	3–6	4–2	4–5	4–3	8–10
Minnesota	6–3	3–3	3–3	14–5	5–14	15–4	13–6	—	4–2	5–4	1–8	1–6	4–5	2–5	9–9
New York	3–4	13–5–1	13–5	5–1	5–4	5–4	6–0	2–4	—	3–6	3–6	13–6	3–4	11–8	10–8
Oakland	14–6	7–2	5–4	8–1	3–4	6–1	6–3	4–5	6–3	—	9–10	7–2	9–10	6–3	12–6
Seattle	15–4	8–1	6–3	7–2	5–2	5–2	6–3	8–1	6–3	10–9	—	7–2	15–5	6–3	12–6
Tampa Bay	2–7	9–10	5–14	2–5	1–5	2–4	2–4	6–1	6–13	2–7	2–7	—	4–5	9–10	10–8
Texas	12–7	7–2	2–5	2–7	4–5	1–8	5–4	5–4	4–3	10–9	5–15	5–4	—	3–6	8–10
Toronto	4–5	12–7	7–12	3–3	4–2	4–2	3–4	5–2	8–11	3–6	3–6	10–9	6–3	—	8–10

=== Opening Day lineup ===
Ray Durham, 2B

José Valentín, CF

Frank Thomas, DH

Magglio Ordóñez, RF

Paul Konerko, 1B

Carlos Lee, LF

Herbert Perry, 3B

Sandy Alomar Jr., C

Royce Clayton, SS

David Wells, P

=== Notable transactions ===
- June 20, 2001: José Canseco signed as a free agent with the Chicago White Sox.
- June 29, 2001: Alan Embree was traded by the San Francisco Giants with cash to the Chicago White Sox for Derek Hasselhoff (minors).
- July 26, 2001: James Baldwin was traded by the Chicago White Sox with cash to the Los Angeles Dodgers for Jeff Barry (minors), Gary Majewski (minors) and Onan Masaoka (minors)
- August 23, 2001: Bill Pulsipher was selected off waivers by the Chicago White Sox from the Boston Red Sox.

=== Roster ===
2001 Chicago White Sox
Roster
Pitchers: 37 James Baldwin; 49 Lorenzo Barceló; 60 Rocky Biddle; 56 Mark Buehrle; 21 Cal Eldred; 57 Alan Embree; 55 Josh Fogg; 29 Keith Foulke; 52 Jon Garland; 58 Matt Ginter; 38 Gary Glover; 46 Bob Howry; 50 Sean Lowe; 13 Antonio Osuna; 40 Jim Parque; 36 Bill Pulsipher; 61 Ken Vining; 33 David Wells; 32 Kip Wells; 62 Dan Wright; 65 Kelly Wunsch	Catchers: 15 Sandy Alomar Jr.; 66 Mark Dalesandro; 8 Mark Johnson; 27 Josh Paul; Infielders: 10 Royce Clayton; 24 Joe Crede; 5 Ray Durham; 17 Tony Graffanino; 14 Paul Konerko; 43 Herbert Perry; 35 Frank Thomas; 22 José Valentín	Outfielders: 31 Jose Canseco; 26 McKay Christensen; 45 Carlos Lee; 39 Jeff Liefer; 30 Magglio Ordóñez; 28 Julio Ramírez; 44 Aaron Rowand; 12 Chris Singleton; Other batters: 3 Harold Baines	Manager: 7 Jerry Manuel; Coaches: 54 Nardi Contreras; 18 Wallace Johnson; 48 Von Joshua; 53 Art Kusnyer; 21 Joe Nossek; 20 Gary Pettis; 59 Man Soo Lee

=== Game log ===
2001 White Sox game log
April (8–15) – home (5–10) – road (3–5)

#	Date	Time	Opponent	Score	Win	Loss	Save	Attendance	Record	Box
1	April 2	@ Indians	7–4	D. Wells (1–0)	Colón (0–1)	Foulke (1)	2:40	42,606	1–0	box
2	April 4	@ Indians	4–8	Finley (1–0)	Eldred (0–1)		2:45	32,763	1–1	box
3	April 6	Tigers	9 – 10 (10)	Patterson (1–0)	Foulke (0–1)	Jones (1)	3:38	43,954	1–2	box
4	April 7	Tigers	3–5	Holt (1–0)	Buehrle (0–1)	Jones (2)	2:31	20,264	1–3	box
5	April 8	Tigers	3–5	Weaver (1–1)	D. Wells (1–1)	Jones (3)	2:49	19,887	1–4	box
6	April 9	Indians	9–2	Biddle (1–0)	Finley (1–1)		2:40	21,242	2–4	box
7	April 10	Indians	8–7	Glover (1–0)	Shuey (0–1)	Foulke (2)	2:56	12,465	3–4	box
8	April 11	Indians	7–6	Lowe (1–0)	Burba (0–1)	Foulke (3)	2:59	12,693	4–4	box
9	April 13	@ Twins	4–7	Redman (1–1)	Buehrle (0–2)	Hawkins (1)	2:34	21,202	4–5	box
10	April 14	@ Twins	4–9	Radke (3–0)	D. Wells (1–2)		2:47	26,487	4–6	box
11	April 15	@ Twins	3–4	Milton (2–0)	Parque (0–1)	Hawkins (2)	2:41	9,141	4–7	box
12	April 17	@ Tigers	4–7	Anderson (1–0)	Wunsch (0–1)	Jones (4)	2:39	13,068	4–8	box
13	April 18	@ Tigers	6–4	Buehrle (1–2)	Holt (1–2)	Foulke (4)	2:49	13,180	5–8	box
14	April 19	@ Tigers	3–1	D. Wells (2–2)	Weaver (1–3)		2:34	14,571	6–8	box
15	April 20	Twins	1–4	Radke (4–0)	Parque (0–2)		2:25	16,557	6–9	box
16	April 21	Twins	3–4	Milton (3–0)	Glover (1–1)	Hawkins (4)	2:15	19,096	6–10	box
17	April 22	Twins	2–4	Carrasco (2–0)	Foulke (0–2)	Hawkins (5)	3:03	19,730	6–11	box
18	April 24	Athletics	4–6	Zito (3–1)	Buehrle (1–3)	Isringhausen (4)	2:53	12,441	6–12	box
19	April 25	Athletics	2 – 1 (11)	Foulke (1–2)	Bradford (0–1)		3:48	12,941	7–12	box
20	April 26	Athletics	6–16	Heredia (1–4)	Parque (0–3)		3:22	12,963	7–13	box
21	April 27	Mariners	3–8	Sele (4–0)	Baldwin (0–1)	Sasaki (12)	3:22	16,276	7–14	box
22	April 28	Mariners	5–8	Tomko (1–1)	Biddle (1–1)	Sasaki (13)	3:38	25,542	7–15	box
23	April 29	Mariners	2 – 1 (14)	Glover (2–1)	Franklin (2–1)		4:03	25,542	8–15	box

May (12–15) – home (6–3) – road (6–12)

#	Date	Time	Opponent	Score	Win	Loss	Save	Attendance	Record	Box
24	May 1	@ Angels	4–6	Rapp (1–3)	D. Wells (2–3)	Percival (5)	2:54	15,664	8–16	box
25	May 2	@ Angels	5–12	Washburn (1–3)	Garland (0–1)		3:15	15,516	8–17	box
26	May 3	@ Angels	1–3	Valdez (2–2)	Baldwin (0–2)	Percival (6)	2:19	15,372	8–18	box
–	May 4	Rangers	Postponed (rain), rescheduled for May 5							
27	May 5	@ Rangers	0–2	Glynn (1–3)	Biddle (1–2)	Zimmerman (3)	2:28	47,674	8–19	box
28	May 6	@ Rangers	10–5	D. Wells (3–3)	Rogers (1–3)	Foulke (5)	3:05	34,871	9–19	box
29	May 7	@ Rangers	7–4	Garland (1–1)	Dickey (0–1)	Foulke (6)	3:20	30,073	10–19	box
30	May 8	Angels	2–0	Baldwin (1–2)	Washburn (1–4)		2:11	13,187	11–19	box
31	May 9	Angels	6–5	Howry (1–0)	Levine (1–2)		2:52	13,458	12–19	box
32	May 10	Angels	6 – 7 (10)	Percival (2–0)	Foulke (1–3)		3:11	12,684	12–20	box
33	May 11	Rangers	6 – 5 (10)	Howry (2–0)	Venafro (1–1)		3:00	19,399	13–20	box
34	May 12	Rangers	6–16	Mahomes (2–2)	Garland (1–2)		3:42	31,647	13–21	box
35	May 13	Rangers	6–3	Baldwin (2–2)	Helling (1–6)	Foulke (7)	2:21	21,019	14–21	box
36	May 15	@ Mariners	3–4	Nelson (2–0)	Howry (2–1)	Paniagua (1)	3:16	31,096	14–22	box
37	May 16	@ Mariners	2–7	Abbott (2–1)	Biddle (1–3)	Paniagua (2)	2:58	33,748	14–23	box
38	May 17	@ Mariners	1–5	García (4–0)	D. Wells (3–4)	Nelson (3)	2:53	43,510	14–24	box
39	May 18	@ Athletics	2–3	Heredia (3–5)	K. Wells (0–1)	Isringhausen (6)	2:40	16,823	14–25	box
40	May 19	@ Athletics	3–4	Mulder (5–2)	Baldwin (2–3)	Isringhausen (7)	2:11	30,820	14–26	box
41	May 20	@ Athletics	2–6	Hudson (4–3)	Howry (2–2)		2:31	39,249	14–27	box
42	May 21	@ Blue Jays	3–10	Parris (3–3)	Biddle (1–4)		2:38	20,806	14–28	box
43	May 23	@ Blue Jays	6–9	Hamilton (2–2)	D. Wells (3–5)	Koch (10)	3:08	19,115	14–29	box
44	May 24	@ Blue Jays	3–1	K. Wells (1–1)	Carpenter (4–2)	Foulke (8)	2:36	17,062	15–29	box
45	May 25	@ Tigers	8–4	Lowe (2–0)	Jones (2–3)		3:08	21,053	16–29	box
46	May 26	@ Tigers	8–0	Buehrle (2–3)	Mlicki (3–5)		2:39	25,881	17–29	box
47	May 27	@ Tigers	3 – 2 (11)	Barceló (1–0)	Patterson (3–2)	Lowe (1)	3:55	17,355	18–29	box
48	May 28	Blue Jays	6–3	Garland (2–2)	Hamilton (2–3)	Howry (1)	3:05	20,631	19–29	box
49	May 29	Blue Jays	0–4	Carpenter (5–2)	K. Wells (1–2)		2:47	13,356	19–30	box
50	May 30	Blue Jays	4–3	Wunsch (1–1)	Escobar (0–3)	Foulke (9)	2:30	13,208	20–30	box
–	May 31	Tigers	Postponed (rain) Rescheduled for September 4							

June (18–9) – home (12–2) – road (6–7)

#	Date	Time	Opponent	Score	Win	Loss	Save	Attendance	Record	Box
51	June 1	Tigers	3–0	Buehrle (3–3)	Mlicki (3–6)	Foulke (10)	2:34	19,840	21–30	box
52	June 2	Tigers	5–3	D. Wells (4–5)	Weaver (4–6)	Foulke (11)	2:30	23,915	22–30	box
53	June 3	Tigers	9 – 6 (10)	Howry (3–2)	Jones (2–4)		3:17	19,446	23–30	box
54	June 5	@ Royals	6–2	K. Wells (2–2)	Reichert (5–5)	Howry (2)	3:05	12,770	24–30	box
55	June 6	@ Royals	6–12	Suppan (3–5)	Baldwin (2–4)		2:38	13,394	24–31	box
56	June 7	@ Royals	5–1	Buehrle (4–3)	Durbin (3–5)		2:27	18,957	25–31	box
57	June 8	Cubs	7 – 3 (10)	Foulke (2–3)	Duncan (3–2)		3:38	45,396	26–31	box
58	June 9	Cubs	3 – 4 (10)	Van Poppel (3–1)	Foulke (2–4)	Fassero (11)	3:26	45,849	26–32	box
59	June 10	Cubs	3–1	K. Wells (3–2)	Lieber (6–4)	Howry (3)	2:41	45,079	27–32	box
60	June 12	Reds	5–0	D. Wells (5–5)	Dessens (5–3)		2:26	21,687	28–32	box
61	June 13	Reds	4–2	Buehrle (5–3)	Bell (0–5)	Foulke (12)	2:27	17,327	29–32	box
62	June 14	Reds	7–5	Wunsch (2–1)	Brower (3–4)	Foulke (13)	2:52	18,201	30–32	box
63	June 15	@ Cardinals	3–10	Benes (6–4)	Garland (2–3)		2:59	42,741	30–33	box
64	June 16	@ Cardinals	3–8	Hermanson (6–5)	K. Wells (3–3)		3:03	43,648	30–34	box
65	June 17	@ Cardinals	3–8	Smith (1–0)	D. Wells (5–6)		2:52	41,515	30–35	box
66	June 18	Royals	5–4	Buehrle (6–3)	Durbin (4–6)	Foulke (14)	2:35	28,882	31–35	box
67	June 19	Royals	5–3	Baldwin (3–4)	Suppan (3–6)	Foulke (15)	2:48	18,715	32–35	box
68	June 20	Royals	2–1	Garland (3–3)	Grimsley (0–3)	Foulke (16)	2:41	21,210	33–35	box
69	June 21	@ Orioles	6–0	K. Wells (4–3)	Johnson (6–4)		2:49	34,735	34–35	box
70	June 22	@ Orioles	4–6	Mercedes (3–8)	D. Wells (5–7)	Groom (5)	2:43	43,101	34–36	box
71	June 23	@ Orioles	8–3	Glover (3–1)	Ponson (4–5)		3:32	40,796	35–36	box
72	June 24	@ Orioles	8–2	Baldwin (4–4)	Towers (5–2)	Lowe (2)	3:02	40,996	36–36	box
73	June 26	@ Twins	6–7	Miller (1–2)	Foulke (2–5)		3:19	16,200	36–37	box
74	June 27	@ Twins	1–4	Lohse (1–0)	K. Wells (4–4)	Hawkins (18)	2:42	19,576	36–38	box
75	June 28	@ Twins	6–3	Lowe (3–0)	Radke (8–4)		2:52	19,576	37–38	box
76	June 29	Orioles	0–4	Towers (6–2)	Buehrle (6–4)	Trombley (6)	2:46	27,890	37–39	box
77	June 30	Orioles	4–1	Baldwin (5–4)	Roberts (6–7)	Foulke (17)	3:11	33,439	38–39	box

July (13–14) – home (5–9) – road (8–5)

#	Date	Time	Opponent	Score	Win	Loss	Save	Attendance	Record	Box
78	July 1	Orioles	3–11	Johnson (7–5)	Biddle (1–5)		3:43	34,588	38–40	box
79	July 2	Twins	5–7	Lohse (2–0)	K. Wells (4–5)	Hawkins (20)	3:19	33,230	38–41	box
80	July 3	Twins	3–5	Radke (9–4)	Lowe (3–1)	Hawkins (21)	2:36	17,964	38–42	box
81	July 4	Twins	4–3	Foulke (3–5)	Hawkins (1–2)		2:51	22,934	39–42	box
82	July 5	Twins	2–12	Mays (11–5)	Baldwin (5–5)		3:02	20,564	39–43	box
83	July 6	Pirates	6–10	Manzanillo (2–2)	Howry (3–3)		3:20	19,554	39–44	box
84	July 7	Pirates	4–1	K. Wells (5–5)	Schmidt (5–4)	Foulke (18)	2:43	25,113	40–44	box
85	July 8	Pirates	9–2	Lowe (4–1)	Ritchie (5–9)		2:11	22,105	41–44	box
All-Star Break: AL defeats NL 4–1 at Safeco Field
86	July 12	@ Cubs	1–5	Fassero (2–2)	Garland (3–4)		3:08	38,233	41–45	box
87	July 13	@ Cubs	7–2	Buehrle (7–4)	Wood (8–6)		3:01	40,157	42–45	box
88	July 14	@ Cubs	3–1	Lowe (5–1)	Tavárez (6–6)	Foulke (19)	2:44	40,551	43–45	box
89	July 15	@ Brewers	3–2	Biddle (2–5)	Sheets (10–6)	Foulke (20)	2:26	42,455	44–45	box
90	July 16	@ Brewers	6–5	Baldwin (6–5)	King (0–2)	Foulke (21)	3:20	42,487	45–45	box
91	July 17	@ Brewers	8–4	K. Wells (6–5)	Haynes (6–12)	Garland (1)	2:58	40,332	46–45	box
92	July 18	Indians	4–9	Sabathia (9–3)	Buehrle (7–5)		3:04	22,634	46–46	box
93	July 19	Indians	3–10	Burba (9–6)	Lowe (5–2)		3:01	23,450	46–47	box
94	July 20	Red Sox	2–7	Nomo (10–4)	Biddle (2–6)		3:06	28,740	46–48	box
95	July 21	Red Sox	10–3	Baldwin (7–5)	Ohka (2–5)		3:27	29,303	47–48	box
96	July 22	Red Sox	13–8	Garland (4–4)	Wakefield (6–5)	Howry (4)	3:56	26,211	48–48	box
97	July 23	@ Indians	0–2	Sabathia (10–3)	Buehrle (7–6)	Wickman (16)	2:52	42,645	48–49	box
98	July 24	@ Indians	4–1	Lowe (6–2)	Burba (9–7)	Foulke (22)	2:43	42,175	49–49	box
99	July 25	@ Indians	5–7	Westbrook (3–2)	Biddle (2–7)	Wickman (17)	3:04	42,645	49–50	box
100	July 26	@ Indians	5–4	Ginter (1–0)	Nagy (4–4)	Foulke (23)	2:45	42,054	50–50	box
101	July 27	@ Red Sox	5–9	Saberhagen (1–0)	K. Wells (6–6)		2:42	33,813	50–51	box
102	July 28	@ Red Sox	3–1	Buehrle (8–6)	Wakefield (6–6)	Foulke (24)	2:53	33,316	51–51	box
103	July 29	@ Red Sox	3–4	Beck (5–3)	Embree (0–3)	Lowe (21)	3:02	33,375	51–52	box
104	July 31	Royals	1 – 2 (10)	Byrd (3–5)	Foulke (3–6)	Hernández (18)	2:53	18,581	51–53	box

August (17–12) – home (8–5) – road (9–7)

#	Date	Time	Opponent	Score	Win	Loss	Save	Attendance	Record	Box
105	August 1	Royals	7–6	Wright (1–0)	George (0–2)	Foulke (25)	3:12	15,620	52–53	box
106	August 2	Royals	3–6	Suppan (5–9)	K. Wells (6–7)	Hernández (19)	2:48	16,021	52–54	box
107	August 3	Devil Rays	4–0	Buehrle (9–6)	Bierbrodt (2–3)		2:12	19,330	53–54	box
108	August 4	Devil Rays	8–6	Biddle (3–7)	Kennedy (3–7)	Foulke (26)	3:14	28,952	54–54	box
109	August 5	Devil Rays	4–6	Zambrano (4–1)	Howry (3–4)	Yan (14)	2:55	21,443	54–55	box
110	August 6	Devil Rays	5–2	Wright (2–0)	Wallace (0–3)	Foulke (27)	2:52	26,944	55–55	box
111	August 7	@ Angels	3–9	Rapp (5–9)	K. Wells (6–8)		2:36	18,498	55–56	box
112	August 8	@ Angels	15–1	Buehrle (10–6)	Washburn (9–6)		2:42	18,864	56–56	box
113	August 9	@ Angels	2–3	Valdez (8–6)	Lowe (6–3)	Percival (31)	2:18	17,896	56–57	box
114	August 10	@ Mariners	8–6	Biddle (4–7)	Sasaki (0–4)	Foulke (28)	3:19	45,665	57–57	box
115	August 11	@ Mariners	3–4	Franklin (5–1)	Foulke (3–7)		3:04	45,898	57–58	box
116	August 12	@ Mariners	1–2	Rhodes (7–0)	K. Wells (6–9)	Sasaki (37)	2:48	45,765	57–59	box
117	August 14	Rangers	7–4	Buehrle (11–6)	Myette (1–2)	Foulke (29)	2:53	22,336	58–59	box
118	August 15	Rangers	6–5	K. Wells (7–9)	Mahomes (5–5)	Foulke (30)	3:12	18,062	59–59	box
119	August 16	Rangers	7–5	K. Wells (8–9)	Petkovsek (1–2)	Foulke (31)	3:24	20,252	60–59	box
120	August 17	Athletics	2–9	Hiljus (2–0)	Wright (2–1)		3:05	33,834	60–60	box
121	August 18	Athletics	4–5	Heredia (7–8)	Howry (3–5)	Isringhausen (24)	3:08	27,861	60–61	box
122	August 19	Athletics	7–8	Magnante (2–1)	Biddle (4–8)	Isringhausen (25)	3:42	25,019	60–62	box
123	August 20	@ Royals	1–10	Stein (5–6)	Lowe (6–4)		2:24	13,842	60–63	box
124	August 21	@ Royals	6–1	Garland (5–4)	Byrd (6–6)		2:49	12,391	61–63	box
125	August 22	@ Royals	13–12	K. Wells (9–9)	Henry (2–1)	Foulke (32)	3:51	11,670	62–63	box
126	August 23	@ Royals	7–6	Biddle (5–8)	Suppan (7–11)	Foulke (33)	3:15	13,541	63–63	box
127	August 24	@ Devil Rays	5–4	Buehrle (12–6)	Sturtze (8–10)	Foulke (34)	2:21	10,650	64–63	box
128	August 25	@ Devil Rays	4–8	Kennedy (5–8)	Wright (2–2)		3:12	26,597	64–64	box
129	August 26	@ Devil Rays	3–2	Garland (6–4)	Seay (0–1)	Foulke (35)	2:52	19,182	65–64	box
130	August 28	@ Tigers	8–6	Embree (1–3)	Patterson (5–4)	Howry (5)	2:59	19,129	66–64	box
131	August 29	@ Tigers	8–3	Glover (4–1)	Redman (2–6)		3:19	21,998	67–64	box
132	August 30	@ Tigers	1–3	Cornejo (3–1)	Buehrle (12–7)	Anderson (16)	2:04	24,364	67–65	box
133	August 31	Indians	11–8	Howry (4–5)	Westbrook (3–4)	Foulke (36)	3:22	24,097	68–65	box

September/October (15–14) – home (10–6) – road (5–8)

#	Date	Time	Opponent	Score	Win	Loss	Save	Attendance	Record	Box
134	September 1	Indians	3–4	Drese (1–0)	Garland (6–5)	Wickman (27)	3:27	27,869	68–66	box
135	September 2	Indians	19–10	Biddle (6–8)	Burba (10–9)		3:32	25,680	69–66	box
136	September 3	Indians	3–6	Sabathia (15–4)	Glover (4–2)	Wickman (28)	2:47	28,135	69–67	box
137	September 4	Tigers	10–1	Buehrle (13–7)	Cornejo (3–2)		2:41	N/A	70–67	box
138	September 4	Tigers	4–0	Lowe (7–4)	Pettyjohn (0–6)		2:31	13,265	71–67	box
139	September 5	Tigers	5–3	Wright (3–2)	Sparks (10–9)	Foulke (37)	2:45	14,576	72–67	box
140	September 6	Tigers	2–6	Weaver (11–14)	Garland (6–6)		3:27	13,602	72–68	box
141	September 7	@ Indians	10–7	Biddle (7–8)	Burba (10–10)	Foulke (38)	3:28	42,487	73–68	box
142	September 8	@ Indians	7–8	Báez (5–1)	Foulke (3–8)		3:13	42,488	73–69	box
143	September 9	@ Indians	8–9	Wickman (5–0)	Foulke (3–9)		3:25	42,377	73–70	box
144	September 10	@ Indians	7–1	Wright (4–2)	Colón (12–11)		3:26	38,244	74–70	box
–	September 11	@ Yankees	Postponed (September 11 attacks), rescheduled for October 1							
–	September 12	@ Yankees	Postponed (September 11 attacks), rescheduled for October 2							
–	September 13	@ Yankees	Postponed (September 11 attacks), rescheduled for October 3							
–	September 14	@ Twins	Postponed (September 11 attacks), rescheduled for October 5							
–	September 15	@ Twins	Postponed (September 11 attacks), rescheduled for October 6							
–	September 16	@ Twins	Postponed (September 11 attacks), rescheduled for October 7							
145	September 18	Yankees	3–11	Hernández (3–6)	Buehrle (13–8)		2:57	22,785	74–71	box
146	September 19	Yankees	3–6	Clemens (20–1)	Glover (4–3)	Rivera (46)	3:05	18,465	74–72	box
147	September 20	Yankees	7–5	Lowe (8–4)	Pettitte (15–10)	Foulke (39)	3:18	22,284	75–72	box
148	September 21	Royals	8–7	Lowe (9–4)	Henry (2–2)		3:10	15,404	76–72	box
149	September 22	Royals	5 – 4 (10)	Foulke (4–9)	Stein (5–8)		4:04	24,307	77–72	box
150	September 23	Royals	10–2	Buehrle (14–8)	Durbin (7–16)		2:30	19,014	78–72	box
151	September 25	Twins	2–4	Mays (17–13)	Glover (4–4)	Guardado (8)	2:49	11,973	78–73	box
152	September 26	Twins	6–3	K. Wells (10–9)	Reed (12–10)	Foulke (40)	2:49	13,006	79–73	box
153	September 27	Twins	9–3	Wright (5–2)	Radke (13–11)	Lowe (3)	2:51	13,567	80–73	box
154	September 28	@ Royals	2–3	Durbin (8–16)	Embree (1–4)	Hernández (27)	2:40	14,914	80–74	box
155	September 29	@ Royals	10–2	Buehrle (15–8)	Suppan (9–14)		3:06	16,443	81–74	box
156	September 30	@ Royals	5–2	Glover (5–4)	George (4–7)	Foulke (41)	2:45	12,235	82–74	box
157	October 1	@ Yankees	1–8	Hitchcock (6–5)	K. Wells (10–10)		2:48	8,112	82–75	box
158	October 2	@ Yankees	4–6	Lilly (5–6)	Wright (5–3)	Rivera (48)	3:15	10,480	82–76	box
159	October 3	@ Yankees	1–2	Mussina (17–11)	Garland (6–7)	Rivera (49)	2:49	14,895	82–77	box
160	October 5	@ Twins	7–4	Buehrle (16–8)	Reed (12–12)	Foulke (42)	2:50	13,631	83–77	box
161	October 6	@ Twins	5–6	Cressend (3–2)	Glover (5–5)	Guardado (11)	2:56	18,599	83–78	box
162	October 7	@ Twins	5–8	Radke (15–11)	K. Wells (10–11)	Guardado (12)	2:46	14,413	83–79	box

== Player stats ==
=== Batting ===
Note: G = Games played; AB = At bats; R = Runs scored; H = Hits; 2B = Doubles; 3B = Triples; HR = Home runs; RBI = Runs batted in; BB = Base on balls; SO = Strikeouts; AVG = Batting average; SB = Stolen bases

Player	G	AB	R	H	2B	3B	HR	RBI	BB	SO	AVG	SB
Sandy Alomar Jr., C	70	220	17	54	8	1	4	21	12	17	.247	1
Harold Baines, DH	32	84	3	11	1	0	0	6	8	16	.131	0
James Baldwin, P	17	2	0	0	0	0	0	0	0	1	.000	0
Rocky Biddle, P	30	1	0	0	0	0	0	0	0	1	.000	0
Mark Buehrle, P	32	3	0	0	0	0	0	0	1	2	.000	0
Jose Canseco, DH, RF	76	256	46	66	8	0	16	49	45	75	.258	2
McKay Christensen, CF	7	4	0	1	0	0	0	0	0	2	.250	0
Royce Clayton, SS	135	433	62	114	21	4	9	60	33	72	.263	10
Joe Crede, 3B	17	50	1	11	1	1	0	7	3	11	.220	1
Mark Dalesandro, C	1	0	0	0	0	0	0	0	0	0	----	0
Ray Durham, 2B	152	611	104	163	42	10	20	65	64	110	.267	23
Jon Garland, P	35	2	0	0	0	0	0	0	0	1	.000	0
Tony Graffanino, 3B, 2B, SS	74	145	23	44	9	0	2	15	16	29	.303	4
Mark Johnson, C	61	173	21	43	6	1	5	18	23	31	.249	2
Paul Konerko, 1B	156	582	92	164	35	0	32	99	54	89	.282	1
Carlos Lee, LF	150	558	75	150	33	3	24	84	38	85	.269	17
Jeff Liefer, OF, 1B, 3B, DH	83	254	36	65	13	0	18	39	20	69	.256	0
Sean Lowe, P	45	3	0	1	0	0	0	0	0	1	.333	0
Magglio Ordóñez, RF	160	593	97	181	40	1	31	113	70	70	.305	25
Josh Paul, C	57	139	20	37	11	0	3	18	13	25	.266	6
Herbert Perry, 3B, 1B, DH	92	285	38	73	21	1	7	32	23	55	.256	2
Julio Ramirez, CF	22	37	2	3	0	0	0	1	2	15	.081	2
Aaron Rowand, CF, LF, RF	63	123	21	36	5	0	4	20	15	28	.293	5
Chris Singleton, CF	140	392	57	117	21	5	7	45	20	61	.298	12
Frank Thomas, DH	20	68	8	15	3	0	4	10	10	12	.221	0
José Valentín, 3B, SS, CF	124	438	74	113	22	2	28	68	50	114	.258	9
David Wells, P	16	2	0	0	0	0	0	0	0	1	.000	0
Kip Wells, P	40	6	1	1	0	0	0	0	0	5	.167	1
Team totals	162	5464	798	1463	300	29	214	770	520	998	.268	123

=== Pitching ===
Note: W = Wins; L = Losses; ERA = Earned run average; G = Games pitched; GS = Games started; SV = Saves; IP = Innings pitched; H = Hits allowed; R = Runs allowed; ER = Earned runs allowed; HR = Home runs allowed; BB = Walks allowed; K = Strikeouts

Player	W	L	ERA	G	GS	SV	IP	H	R	ER	HR	BB	K
James Baldwin	7	5	4.61	17	16	0	95.2	109	56	49	15	38	42
Lorenzo Barceló	1	0	4.71	17	0	0	21.0	24	13	11	1	10	15
Rocky Biddle	7	8	5.39	30	21	0	128.2	137	87	77	16	55	85
Mark Buehrle	16	8	3.29	32	32	0	221.1	188	89	81	24	50	126
Cal Eldred	0	1	13.50	2	2	0	6.0	12	9	9	1	4	6
Alan Embree	1	2	5.03	39	0	0	34.0	31	21	19	7	7	34
Josh Fogg	0	0	2.03	11	0	0	13.1	10	3	3	0	4	17
Keith Foulke	4	9	2.33	72	0	42	81.0	57	21	21	3	23	75
Jon Garland	6	7	3.69	35	16	1	117.0	123	59	48	16	57	61
Matt Ginter	1	0	5.22	20	0	0	39.2	34	23	23	2	16	24
Gary Glover	5	5	4.93	46	11	0	100.1	98	61	55	16	35	63
Bob Howry	4	5	4.69	69	0	5	78.2	85	41	41	11	39	64
Sean Lowe	9	4	3.61	45	11	3	127.0	123	55	51	12	34	71
Antonio Osuna	0	0	20.77	4	0	0	4.1	8	10	10	3	3	6
Jim Parque	0	3	8.04	5	5	0	28.0	36	26	25	7	11	15
Bill Pulsipher	0	0	7.88	14	0	0	8.0	11	8	7	2	7	4
Ken Vining	0	0	17.55	8	0	0	6.2	15	14	13	3	7	3
David Wells	5	7	4.47	16	16	0	100.2	120	55	50	12	22	59
Kip Wells	10	11	4.79	40	20	0	133.1	145	80	71	14	66	99
Dan Wright	5	3	5.70	13	12	0	66.1	78	45	42	12	40	36
Kelly Wunsch	2	1	7.66	33	0	0	22.1	21	19	19	4	10	16
Team totals	83	79	4.55	162	162	51	1433.1	1465	795	725	181	538	921

== Farm system ==
Level	Team	League	Manager
AAA	Charlotte Knights	International League	Nick Leyva
AA	Birmingham Barons	Southern League	Nick Capra
A	Winston-Salem Warthogs	Carolina League	Wally Backman
A	Kannapolis Intimidators	South Atlantic League	Razor Shines
Rookie	Bristol White Sox	Appalachian League	John Orton
Rookie	AZL White Sox	Arizona League	Jerry Hairston, Sr.
