= 2001 Boston Red Sox season =

Major League Baseball season

2001 Boston Red Sox
- League: American League
- Division: East
- Ballpark: Fenway Park
- City: Boston, Massachusetts
- Record: 82–79 (.509)
- Divisional place: 2nd
- Owners: JRY Trust
- President: John Harrington
- General manager: Dan Duquette
- Managers: Jimy Williams: 65–53 (.551); Joe Kerrigan: 17–26 (.395)
- Television: WFXT (Sean McDonough, Jerry Remy); NESN (Don Orsillo, Jerry Remy)
- Radio: WEEI (Jerry Trupiano, Joe Castiglione); WRCA (Adrian García Márquez, Bobby Serano and J. P. Villaman)
- Stats: ESPN.com; Baseball Reference

The 2001 Boston Red Sox season was the 101st season in the franchise's Major League Baseball history. The Red Sox finished second in the American League East with a record 82–79 (.509), 13 1/2 games behind the New York Yankees, who went on to win the AL championship. The Red Sox did not qualify for the postseason, as the AL wild card went to the Oakland Athletics, who finished second in the American League West with a record of 102–60 (.630).

In mid-August, manager Jimy Williams was dismissed by general manager Dan Duquette; Joe Kerrigan, who had been the team's pitching coach, served as manager for the remainder of the season. The 2001 Red Sox allowed the most stolen bases in a season in the live-ball era, with 223, breaking the record of 216 set by the 1986 Philadelphia Phillies.

The end of the regular season was pushed back from September 30 to October 7 due to the September 11 attacks. The Red Sox only played 161 games, as their rained out game of September 10 against the Yankees in New York was not rescheduled, as it had no bearing on the postseason.

== Offseason ==
- November 16, 2000: Chris Stynes was traded by the Cincinnati Reds to the Boston Red Sox for Michael Coleman and Donnie Sadler.
- December 2000: Free agent Manny Ramirez signed an eight-year $160 million contract with the Red Sox.
- January 11, 2001: David Cone signed as a free agent with the Boston Red Sox.
- January 19, 2001: Craig Grebeck was signed as a free agent with the Boston Red Sox.

== Regular season ==
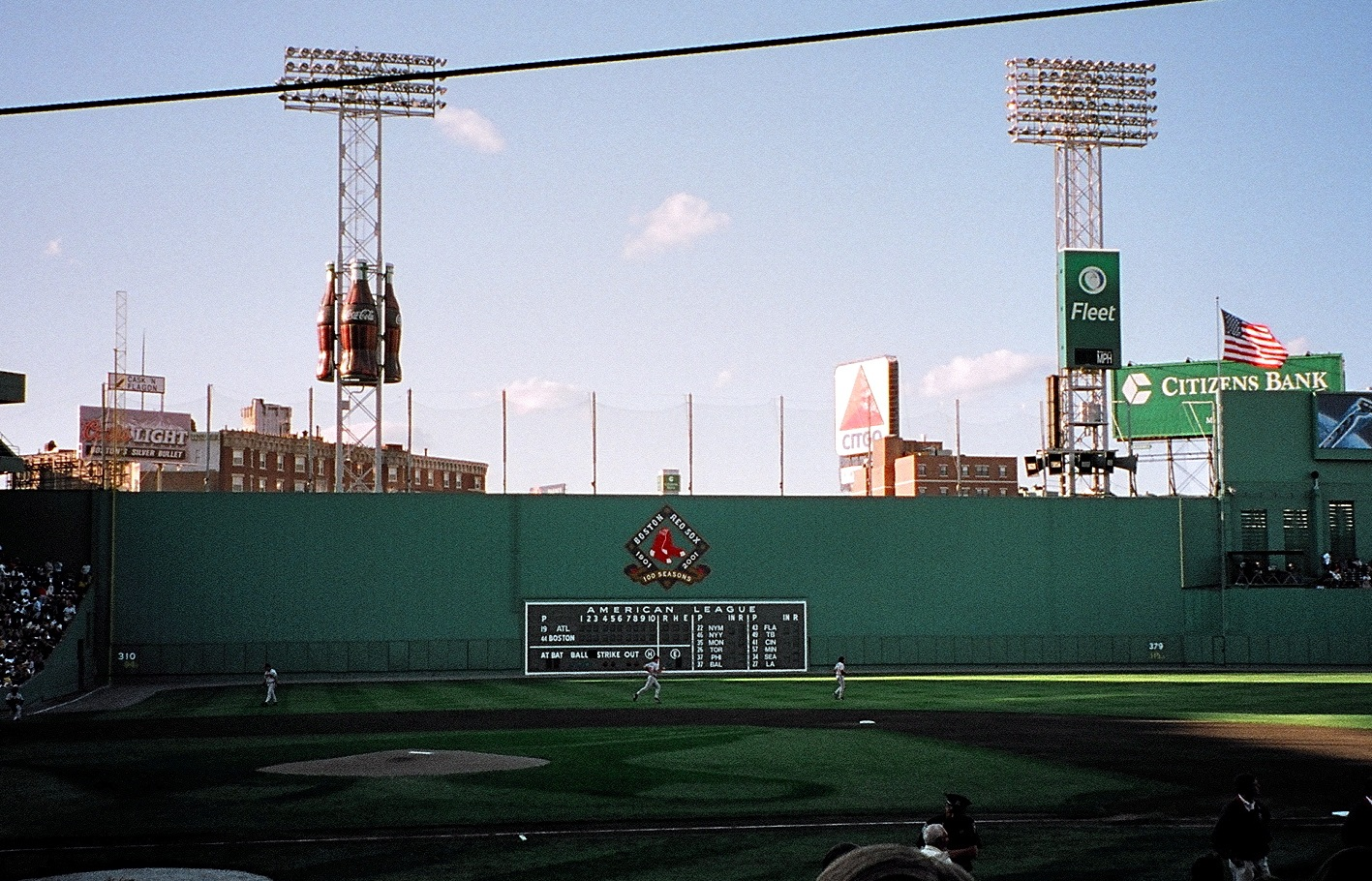
The Red Sox hosting a home game against the season's eventual NL East Division Champions Atlanta Braves in July 2001.

=== Season standings ===
AL East
Team	W	L	Pct.	GB	Home	Road
New York Yankees	95	65	.594	—	51‍–‍28	44‍–‍37
Boston Red Sox	82	79	.509	13½	41‍–‍40	41‍–‍39
Toronto Blue Jays	80	82	.494	16	40‍–‍42	40‍–‍40
Baltimore Orioles	63	98	.391	32½	30‍–‍50	33‍–‍48
Tampa Bay Devil Rays	62	100	.383	34	37‍–‍44	25‍–‍56

=== Record vs. opponents ===
2001 American League record Source: MLB Standings Grid – 2001
Team	ANA	BAL	BOS	CWS	CLE	DET	KC	MIN	NYY	OAK	SEA	TB	TEX	TOR	NL
Anaheim	—	4–5	4–3	6–3	5–4	5–4	5–4	3–6	4–3	6–14	4–15	7–2	7–12	5–4	10–8
Baltimore	5–4	—	9–10	3–4	1–5	4–2	5–2	3–3	5–13–1	2–7	1–8	10–9	2–7	7–12	6–12
Boston	3–4	10–9	—	3–3	3–6	4–5	3–3	3–3	5–13	4–5	3–6	14–5	5–2	12–7	10–8
Chicago	3–6	4–3	3–3	—	10–9	13–6	14–5	5–14	1–5	1–8	2–7	5–2	7–2	3–3	12–6
Cleveland	4–5	5–1	6–3	9–10	—	13–6	11–8	14–5	4–5	4–3	2–5	5–1	5–4	2–4	7–11
Detroit	4–5	2–4	5–4	6–13	6–13	—	8–11	4–15	4–5	1–6	2–5	4–2	8–1	2–4	10–8
Kansas City	4–5	2–5	3–3	5–14	8–11	11–8	—	6–13	0–6	3–6	3–6	4–2	4–5	4–3	8–10
Minnesota	6–3	3–3	3–3	14–5	5–14	15–4	13–6	—	4–2	5–4	1–8	1–6	4–5	2–5	9–9
New York	3–4	13–5–1	13–5	5–1	5–4	5–4	6–0	2–4	—	3–6	3–6	13–6	3–4	11–8	10–8
Oakland	14–6	7–2	5–4	8–1	3–4	6–1	6–3	4–5	6–3	—	9–10	7–2	9–10	6–3	12–6
Seattle	15–4	8–1	6–3	7–2	5–2	5–2	6–3	8–1	6–3	10–9	—	7–2	15–5	6–3	12–6
Tampa Bay	2–7	9–10	5–14	2–5	1–5	2–4	2–4	6–1	6–13	2–7	2–7	—	4–5	9–10	10–8
Texas	12–7	7–2	2–5	2–7	4–5	1–8	5–4	5–4	4–3	10–9	5–15	5–4	—	3–6	8–10
Toronto	4–5	12–7	7–12	3–3	4–2	4–2	3–4	5–2	8–11	3–6	3–6	10–9	6–3	—	8–10

Red Sox vs. National League East
Team	ATL	FLA	MON	NYM	PHI
Boston	3–3	2–1	2–1	1–2	2–1

=== Transactions ===
- April 18, 2001: Bill Pulsipher was signed as a free agent with the Boston Red Sox.
- June 5, 2001: Kevin Youkilis was drafted by the Boston Red Sox in the 8th round of the 2001 amateur draft. Player signed June 11, 2001.
- June 12, 2001: Justin Duchscherer was traded by the Boston Red Sox to the Texas Rangers for Doug Mirabelli.
- July 2, 2001: Joe Oliver was signed as a free agent with the Boston Red Sox.
- July 31, 2001: Ugueth Urbina was traded by the Montreal Expos to the Boston Red Sox for Tomokazu Ohka and Rich Rundles (minors).
- August 23, 2001: Bill Pulsipher was selected off waivers by the Chicago White Sox from the Boston Red Sox.

=== Famous firsts involving the Red Sox ===
- Monday, August 6, 2001 – Scott Hatteberg became the first player to hit into a triple play and hit a grand slam during the same game.
- Sunday, September 2, 2001 – This was the first day in Major League history where the final score in four games was 1-0: Yankees 1 vs. Red Sox 0, Padres 1 vs. Diamondbacks 0, Astros 1 vs. Brewers 0, and Blue Jays 1 vs. Tigers 0.

=== Opening Day line up ===
12	Chris Stynes	2B
7	Trot Nixon	RF
33	Jason Varitek	C
24	Manny Ramírez	DH
2	Carl Everett	CF
25	Troy O'Leary	LF
29	Shea Hillenbrand	3B
23	Brian Daubach	1B
15	Craig Grebeck	SS
45	Pedro Martínez	P

=== Roster ===
2001 Boston Red Sox
Roster
Pitchers: 44 Rolando Arrojo; 18 Willie Banks; 47 Rod Beck; 43 Carlos Castillo; 37 Frank Castillo; 36 David Cone; 63 Paxton Crawford; 55 Todd Erdos; 39 Bryce Florie; 59 Casey Fossum; 34 Rich Garcés; 62 Sun-Woo Kim; 32 Derek Lowe; 45 Pedro Martínez; 46 Allen McDill; 11 Hideo Nomo; 18 Tomo Ohka; 35 Hipólito Pichardo; 46 Bill Pulsipher; 17 Bret Saberhagen; 50 Pete Schourek; 41 Ugueth Urbina; 49 Tim Wakefield	Catchers: 10 Scott Hatteberg; 28 Marcus Jensen; 28 Doug Mirabelli; 39 Joe Oliver; 33 Jason Varitek; Infielders: 54 Morgan Burkhart; 23 Brian Daubach; 5 Nomar Garciaparra; 15 Craig Grebeck; 29 Shea Hillenbrand; 3 Mike Lansing; 52 James Lofton; 26 Lou Merloni; 30 José Offerman; 57 Calvin Pickering; 53 Ángel Santos; 12 Chris Stynes; 13 John Valentin	Outfielders: 56 Israel Alcántara; 19 Dante Bichette; 2 Carl Everett; 20 Darren Lewis; 7 Trot Nixon; 25 Troy O'Leary; Designated hitter: 24 Manny Ramírez	Manager: 16 Joe Kerrigan; 22 Jimy Williams; Coaches: 52 John Cumberland (Bullpen, Pitching); 48 Rick Down (Hitting); 51 Tommy Harper (First base); 38 Dave Jauss (Bench); 16 Joe Kerrigan (Pitching); 31 Gene Lamont (Third base); 60 Dana LeVangie (Bullpen catcher, Bullpen); 58 Nelson Norman (Infield); 67 Ed Riley (Pitching assistant); 50 Ralph Treuel (Pitching)

== Player stats ==
=== Batting ===
==== Starters by position ====
Note: Pos = Position; G = Games played; AB = At bats; H = Hits; Avg. = Batting average; HR = Home runs; RBI = Runs batted in; SB = Stolen bases

Pos	Player	G	AB	H	Avg.	HR	RBI	SB
C	Scott Hatteberg	94	278	68	.245	3	25	1
1B	Brian Daubach	122	407	107	.263	22	71	1
2B	José Offerman	128	524	140	.267	9	49	5
SS	Mike Lansing	106	352	88	.250	8	34	3
3B	Shea Hillenbrand	139	468	123	.263	12	49	3
LF	Troy O'Leary	104	341	82	.240	13	50	1
CF	Carl Everett	102	409	105	.257	14	58	9
RF	Trot Nixon	148	535	150	.280	27	88	7
DH	Manny Ramirez	142	529	162	.306	41	125	0

==== Other batters ====
Note: G = Games played; AB = At bats; H = Hits; Avg. = Batting average; HR = Home runs; RBI = Runs batted in; SB = Stolen bases

Player	G	AB	H	Avg.	HR	RBI	SB
Dante Bichette	107	391	112	.286	12	49	2
Chris Stynes	96	361	101	.280	8	33	4
Jason Varitek	51	174	51	.293	7	25	0
Darren Lewis	82	164	46	.280	1	12	5
Lou Merloni	52	146	39	.267	3	13	2
Doug Mirabelli	54	141	38	.270	9	26	0
Nomar Garciaparra	27	83	24	.289	4	8	0
John Valentin	20	60	12	.200	1	5	0
Calvin Pickering	24	50	14	.280	3	7	0
Craig Grebeck	23	41	2	.049	0	2	0
Izzy Alcántara	14	38	10	.263	0	3	1
Morgan Burkhart	11	33	6	.182	1	4	0
James Lofton	8	26	5	.192	0	1	2
Ángel Santos	9	16	2	.125	0	1	0
Joe Oliver	5	12	3	.250	0	0	0
Marcus Jensen	1	4	1	.250	0	0	0

=== Starting pitchers ===
Note: G = Games pitched; GS = Games started; IP = Innings pitched; W = Wins; L = Losses; SV = Saves; ERA = Earned run average; SO = Strikeouts

Player	G	GS	IP	W	L	ERA	SO
Hideo Nomo	33	33	198.0	13	10	4.50	220
Frank Castillo	26	26	136.2	10	9	4.21	89
David Cone	25	25	135.2	9	7	4.31	115
Pedro Martínez	18	18	116.2	7	3	2.39	163
Tomo Ohka	12	11	52.1	2	5	6.19	37
Paxton Crawford	8	7	36.0	3	0	4.75	29
Bret Saberhagen	3	3	15.0	1	2	6.00	10

==== Other pitchers ====
Note: G = Games pitched; IP = Innings pitched; W = Wins; L = Losses; SV = Saves; ERA = Earned run average; SO = Strikeouts

Player	G	IP	W	L	SV	ERA	SO
Tim Wakefield	45	168.2	9	12	3	3.90	148
Rolando Arrojo	41	103.1	5	4	5	3.48	78
Casey Fossum	13	44.1	3	2	0	4.87	26

==== Relief pitchers ====
Note: G = Games pitched; GS = Games started; IP = Innings pitched; W = Wins; L = Losses; SV = Saves; ERA = Earned run average; SO = Strikeouts

Player	G	GS	IP	W	L	SV	ERA	SO
Derek Lowe	67	3	91.2	5	10	24	3.53	82
Rod Beck	68	0	80.2	6	4	6	3.90	63
Rich Garcés	62	0	67.0	6	1	1	3.90	51
Sun-woo Kim	20	2	41.2	0	2	0	5.83	27
Hipólito Pichardo	30	0	34.2	2	1	0	4.93	17
Pete Schourek	33	0	30.1	1	5	0	4.45	20
Bill Pulsipher	23	0	22.0	0	0	0	5.32	16
Ugueth Urbina	19	0	20.0	0	1	9	2.25	32
Todd Erdos	10	0	16.1	0	0	0	4.96	7
Allen McDill	15	0	14.2	0	0	0	5.52	16
Willie Banks	5	0	10.2	0	0	0	0.84	10
Bryce Florie	7	0	8.2	0	1	0	11.42	7
Carlos Castillo	2	0	3.0	0	0	0	6.00	0

== Game log ==
Red Sox Win	Red Sox Loss	Game postponed

2001 Boston Red Sox Season Game Log: 82–79 (Home: 41–40; Away: 41–39)
April: 16–9

#	Date	Opponent	Score	Win	Loss	Save	Stadium	Attendance	Record	Streak
1	April 2	@ Orioles	1–2 (11)	Kohlmeier (1–0)	Lowe (0–1)	—	Camden Yards	46,547	0–1	L1
2	April 4	@ Orioles	3–0	Nomo (1–0)	Ponson (0–1)	—	Camden Yards	35,602	1–1	W1
3	April 5	@ Orioles	1–2	Groom (1–0)	Lowe (0–2)	—	Camden Yards	33,469	1–2	L1
4	April 6	Devil Rays	11–4	Wakefield (1–0)	Rupe (0–1)	—	Fenway Park	33,525	2–2	W1
5	April 7	Devil Rays	6–2	Crawford (1–0)	Harper (0–1)	—	Fenway Park	31,660	3–2	W2
6	April 8	Devil Rays	3–0	Martínez (1–0)	Lopez (1–1)	Lowe (1)	Fenway Park	31,383	4–2	W3
7	April 10	Orioles	10–1	Nomo (2–0)	Ponson (0–2)	Wakefield (1)	Fenway Park	27,664	5–2	W4
8	April 11	Orioles	4–5	Roberts (1–0)	Castillo (0–1)	Groom (1)	Fenway Park	26,302	5–3	L1
9	April 12	Orioles	8–2	Ohka (1–0)	Mercedes (0–2)	Arrojo (1)	Fenway Park	30,083	6–3	W1
10	April 13	Yankees	3–2 (10)	Lowe (1–2)	Rivera (0–1)	—	Fenway Park	33,124	7–3	W2
11	April 14	Yankees	2–3	Stanton (1–0)	Schourek (0–1)	Rivera (3)	Fenway Park	33,396	7–4	L1
12	April 15	Yankees	5–4	Garcés (1–0)	Pettitte (2–1)	Arrojo (2)	Fenway Park	32,127	8–4	W1
13	April 16	Yankees	4–1	Castillo (1–1)	Mussina (1–1)	Beck (1)	Fenway Park	33,373	9–4	W2
14	April 17	@ Devil Rays	10–0	Ohka (2–0)	Harper (0–2)	—	Tropicana Field	19,433	10–4	W3
15	April 18	@ Devil Rays	9–1	Arrojo (1–0)	Sturtze (0–2)	—	Tropicana Field	16,622	11–4	W4
16	April 19	@ Devil Rays	8–3	Martínez (2–0)	Wilson (0–2)	Lowe (2)	Tropicana Field	22,026	12–4	W5
17	April 20	@ Yankees	1–6	Pettitte (3–1)	Nomo (2–1)	—	Yankee Stadium	54,366	12–5	L1
18	April 21	@ Yankees	8–3	Castillo (2–1)	Mussina (1–2)	—	Yankee Stadium	55,483	13–5	W1
19	April 22	@ Yankees	3–4 (10)	Rivera (1–1)	Lowe (1–3)	—	Yankee Stadium	55,278	13–6	L1
20	April 24	Twins	9–4	Crawford (2–0)	Redman (1–2)	Wakefield (2)	Fenway Park	32,557	14–6	W1
21	April 25	Twins	6–4 (10)	Wells (2–0)	Beck (0–1)	Hawkins (6)	Fenway Park	33,177	14–7	L1
22	April 26	Twins	2–0	Nomo (3–1)	Milton (3–1)	Lowe (3)	Fenway Park	32,222	15–7	W1
23	April 27	Royals	9–2	Castillo (3–1)	Stein (1–3)	Arrojo (3)	Fenway Park	31,850	16–7	W2
24	April 28	Royals	2–8	Reichert (3–1)	Ohka (2–1)	—	Fenway Park	32,442	16–8	L1
25	April 29	Royals	8–11 (11)	Santiago (1–0)	Lowe (1–4)	Hernández (5)	Fenway Park	32,791	16–9	L2

May: 13–13

#	Date	Opponent	Score	Win	Loss	Save	Stadium	Attendance	Record	Streak
26	May 1	@ Mariners	2–0	Martínez (3–0)	Halama (2–2)	Arrojo (4)	Safeco Field	36,642	17–9	W1
27	May 2	@ Mariners	1–5	Sele (5–0)	Nomo (3–2)	—	Safeco Field	40,170	17–10	L1
28	May 3	@ Mariners	3–10	Moyer (5–0)	Castillo (3–2)	—	Safeco Field	32,513	17–11	L2
29	May 4	@ Athletics	3–7	Heredia (2–4)	Lowe (1–5)	Tam (1)	Network Associates Coliseum	20,631	17–12	L3
30	May 5	@ Athletics	7–1	Crawford (3–0)	Zito (3–3)	—	Network Associates Coliseum	29,248	18–12	W1
31	May 6	@ Athletics	5–4	Martínez (4–0)	Lidle (0–2)	Beck (2)	Network Associates Coliseum	40,186	19–12	W2
32	May 8	Mariners	12–4	Nomo (4–2)	Moyer (5–1)	—	Fenway Park	32,941	20–12	W3
33	May 9	Mariners	5–10	Nelson (1–0)	Arrojo (1–1)	Sasaki (15)	Fenway Park	31,616	20–13	L1
34	May 10	Mariners	2–5	Halama (3–3)	Ohka (2–2)	Sasaki (16)	Fenway Park	31,428	20–14	L2
35	May 11	Athletics	6–7	Isringhausen (1–1)	Beck (0–2)	Tam (2)	Fenway Park	32,718	20–15	L3
36	May 12	Athletics	9–3	Martínez (5–0)	Heredia (2–5)	—	Fenway Park	32,686	21–15	W1
37	May 13	Athletics	5–4 (11)	Lowe (2–5)	Tam (0–1)	—	Fenway Park	31,926	22–15	W2
38	May 15	@ Twins	5–2	Castillo (4–2)	Redman (2–4)	—	Metrodome	15,332	23–15	W3
39	May 16	@ Twins	3–4	Wells (3–0)	Schourek (0–2)	Hawkins (13)	Metrodome	22,006	23–16	L1
40	May 17	@ Twins	3–5	Radke (7–1)	Arrojo (1–2)	—	Metrodome	18,466	23–17	L2
41	May 18	@ Royals	6–3	Martínez (6–0)	Stein (1–4)	—	Kaufmann Stadium	34,154	24–17	W1
42	May 19	@ Royals	2–6	Reichert (4–4)	Nomo (4–3)	—	Kaufmann Stadium	26,853	24–18	L1
43	May 20	@ Royals	10–3	Castillo (5–2)	Meadows (1–5)	—	Kaufmann Stadium	18,596	25–18	W1
—	May 22	@ Yankees	Postponed (rain). Makeup date June 4.							
44	May 23	@ Yankees	3–7	Pettitte (5–3)	Cone (0–1)	—	Yankee Stadium	44,108	25–19	L1
45	May 24	@ Yankees	1–2	Mussina (5–4)	Martínez (6–1)	Rivera (13)	Yankee Stadium	55,592	25–20	L2
46	May 25	Blue Jays	4–0	Nomo (5–3)	Loaiza (4–5)	—	Fenway Park	32,912	26–20	W1
47	May 26	Blue Jays	0–5	Michalak (5–3)	Castillo (5–3)	—	Fenway Park	31,035	26–21	L1
48	May 27	Blue Jays	4–2	Wakefield (2–0)	Parris (3–4)	Lowe (4)	Fenway Park	31,420	27–21	W1
49	May 28	Yankees	3–4	Pettitte (6–3)	Schourek (0–3)	Rivera (15)	Fenway Park	33,125	27–22	L1
50	May 29	Yankees	3–0	Martínez (7–1)	Mussina (5–5)	Lowe (5)	Fenway Park	33,711	28–22	W1
51	May 31	@ Blue Jays	11–5	Beck (1–2)	Escobar (0–4)	—	SkyDome	21,747	29–22	W2

June: 17–11

#	Date	Opponent	Score	Win	Loss	Save	Stadium	Attendance	Record	Streak
52	June 1	@ Blue Jays	6–4 (11)	Lowe (3–5)	Koch (0–2)	—	SkyDome	21,564	30–22	W3
53	June 2	@ Blue Jays	2–1	Schourek (1–3)	Plesac (0–2)	Beck (3)	SkyDome	24,603	31–22	W4
54	June 3	@ Blue Jays	5–4	Pichardo (1–0)	Carpenter (5–3)	Lowe (6)	SkyDome	24,643	32–22	W5
55	June 4	@ Yankees	6–7	Rivera (2–3)	Beck (1–3)	—	Yankee Stadium	41,771	32–23	L1
56	June 5	Tigers	4–3 (18)	Wakefield (3–0)	Borkowski (0–2)	—	Fenway Park	32,814	33–23	W1
57	June 6	Tigers	3–7	Mlicki (4–6)	Castillo (5–4)	Anderson (2)	Fenway Park	32,794	33–24	L1
58	June 7	Tigers	8–1	Wakefield (4–0)	Santos (1–2)	Arrojo (5)	Fenway Park	32,132	34–24	W1
59	June 8	Phillies	3–2	Cone (1–1)	Wolf (4–6)	Lowe (7)	Fenway Park	33,435	35–24	W2
60	June 9	Phillies	2–5	Daal (7–1)	Martínez (7–2)	Mesa (17)	Fenway Park	32,944	35–25	L1
61	June 10	Phillies	5–4	Nomo (6–3)	Cormier (3–1)	Lowe (8)	Fenway Park	32,767	36–25	W1
62	June 12	Marlins	4–2	Castillo (6–4)	Dempster (6–7)	Lowe (9)	Fenway Park	32,816	37–25	W2
63	June 13	Marlins	2–4	Clement (3–5)	Wakefield (4–1)	Alfonseca (13)	Fenway Park	31,637	37–26	L1
64	June 14	Marlins	6–4	Cone (2–1)	Smith (3–2)	Beck (4)	Fenway Park	33,225	38–26	W1
65	June 15	@ Braves	9–5 (10)	Beck (2–3)	Cabrera (4–2)	—	Turner Field	48,469	39–26	W2
66	June 16	@ Braves	0–8	Burkett (6–5)	Nomo (6–4)	—	Turner Field	50,524	39–27	L1
67	June 17	@ Braves	4–3	Castillo (7–4)	Pérez (4–5)	Lowe (10)	Turner Field	45,362	40–27	W1
68	June 19	@ Devil Rays	5–4	Wakefield (5–1)	Rekar (1–8)	Lowe (11)	Tropicana Field	12,550	41–27	W2
69	June 20	@ Devil Rays	8–2	Garcés (2–0)	Rupe (4–6)	—	Tropicana Field	12,520	42–27	W3
70	June 21	@ Devil Rays	7–4	Beck (3–3)	Yan (2–3)	Lowe (12)	Tropicana Field	15,603	43–27	W4
71	June 22	Blue Jays	3–4	Borbón (2–3)	Schourek (1–4)	Koch (12)	Fenway Park	33,844	43–28	L1
72	June 23	Blue Jays	6–9	File (3–1)	Castillo (7–5)	Koch (13)	Fenway Park	33,266	43–29	L2
73	June 24	Blue Jays	2–5	Plesac (1–2)	Wakefield (5–2)	Koch (14)	Fenway Park	32,804	43–30	L3
74	June 25	Devil Rays	12–8	Cone (3–1)	Rupe (4–7)	Lowe (13)	Fenway Park	32,854	44–30	W1
75	June 26	Devil Rays	7–6	Beck (4–3)	Zambrano (0–1)	Lowe (14)	Fenway Park	32,185	45–30	W2
76	June 27	Devil Rays	7–9	Creek (2–1)	Schourek (1–5)	—	Fenway Park	33,216	45–31	L1
77	June 28	Devil Rays	3–4	Colomé (1–0)	Lowe (3–6)	—	Fenway Park	33,433	45–32	L2
78	June 29	@ Blue Jays	4–8	Quantrill (7–1)	Florie (0–1)	—	SkyDome	23,055	45–33	L3
79	June 30	@ Blue Jays	7–5	Cone (4–1)	Hamilton (3–6)	—	SkyDome	28,543	46–33	W1

July: 14–12

#	Date	Opponent	Score	Win	Loss	Save	Stadium	Attendance	Record	Streak
80	July 1	@ Blue Jays	4–0	Arrojo (2–2)	Carpenter (7–5)	—	SkyDome	34,348	47–33	W2
81	July 2	@ Blue Jays	16–4	Nomo (7–4)	Loaiza (5–9)	—	SkyDome	38,237	48–33	W3
82	July 3	@ Indians	1–9	Westbrook (2–0)	Ohka (2–3)	—	Jacobs Field	42,520	48–34	L1
83	July 4	@ Indians	13–4	Wakefield (6–2)	Burba (8–6)	—	Jacobs Field	42,382	49–34	W1
84	July 5	@ Indians	5–4	Lowe (4–6)	Rocker (3–3)	—	Jacobs Field	42,647	50–34	W2
85	July 6	Braves	5–6 (10)	Karsay (1–1)	Kim (0–1)	Cabrera (2)	Fenway Park	33,723	50–35	L1
86	July 7	Braves	3–1	Nomo (8–4)	Marquis (2–3)	Lowe (15)	Fenway Park	33,355	51–35	W1
87	July 8	Braves	0–8	Glavine (7–5)	Ohka (2–4)	—	Fenway Park	32,677	51–36	L1
72nd Major League Baseball All-Star Game
88	July 12	@ Mets	2–4	Leiter (5–8)	Wakefield (6–3)	Benítez (19)	Shea Stadium	37,698	51–37	L2
89	July 13	@ Mets	3–1	Cone (5–1)	Appier (5–9)	Lowe (16)	Shea Stadium	42,219	52–37	W1
90	July 14	@ Mets	0–2	Rusch (5–5)	Arrojo (2–3)	Benítez (20)	Shea Stadium	52,006	52–38	L1
91	July 15	@ Expos	8–5	Nomo (9–4)	Thurman (4–6)	Lowe (17)	Olympic Stadium	32,965	53–38	W1
92	July 16	@ Expos	6–5	Pichardo (2–0)	Lloyd (7–2)	Lowe (18)	Olympic Stadium	16,005	54–38	W2
93	July 17	@ Expos	7–11	Mattes (3–1)	Wakefield (6–4)	—	Olympic Stadium	13,348	54–39	L1
94	July 18	@ Blue Jays	5–4	Garcés (3–0)	Koch (1–3)	Lowe (19)	SkyDome	30,449	55–39	W1
95	July 19	@ Blue Jays	3–4	Escobar (2–4)	Lowe (4–7)	—	SkyDome	30,488	55–40	L1
96	July 20	@ White Sox	7–2	Nomo (10–4)	Biddle (2–6)	—	Comiskey Park	28,740	56–40	W1
97	July 21	@ White Sox	3–10	Baldwin (7–5)	Ohka (2–5)	—	Comiskey Park	29,303	56–41	L1
98	July 22	@ White Sox	8–13	Garland (4–4)	Wakefield (6–5)	Howry (4)	Comiskey Park	26,221	56–42	L2
99	July 24	Blue Jays	6–4	Cone (6–1)	Hamilton (5–7)	Lowe (20)	Fenway Park	33,154	57–42	W1
100	July 25	Blue Jays	3–4 (10)	Quantrill (9–2)	Lowe (4–8)	Koch (20)	Fenway Park	33,030	57–43	L1
101	July 26	Blue Jays	6–3	Nomo (11–4)	File (3–2)	Beck (5)	Fenway Park	32,094	58–43	W1
102	July 27	White Sox	9–5	Saberhagen (1–0)	Wells (6–6)	—	Fenway Park	33,813	59–43	W2
103	July 28	White Sox	1–3	Buehrle (8–6)	Wakefield (6–6)	Foulke (24)	Fenway Park	33,316	59–44	L1
104	July 29	White Sox	4–3	Beck (5–3)	Embree (0–3)	Lowe (21)	Fenway Park	33,375	60–44	W1
105	July 31	Angels	3–4	Ortiz (9–7)	Garcés (3–1)	Percival (28)	Fenway Park	33,909	60–45	L1

August: 11–17

#	Date	Opponent	Score	Win	Loss	Save	Stadium	Attendance	Record	Streak
106	August 1	Angels	2–4	Schoenweis (8–8)	Nomo (11–5)	Levine (2)	Fenway Park	33,551	60–46	L2
107	August 2	Angels	4–13	Rapp (4–9)	Saberhagen (1–1)	—	Fenway Park	33,661	60–47	L3
—	August 3	Rangers	Postponed (rain). Makeup date August 4.							
108	August 4 (1)	Rangers	10–4	Cone (7–1)	Helling (8–9)	—	Fenway Park	32,249	61–47	W1
109	August 4 (2)	Rangers	6–2	Wakefield (7–2)	Davis (5–8)	—	Fenway Park	32,338	62–47	W2
110	August 5	Rangers	6–3	Arrojo (3–3)	Oliver (9–7)	Lowe (22)	Fenway Park	32,923	63–47	W3
111	August 6	Rangers	10–7	Fossum (1–0)	Moreno (2–2)	Lowe (23)	Fenway Park	33,977	64–47	W4
112	August 7	@ Athletics	2–5	Mulder (14–6)	Saberhagen (1–2)	Isringhausen (22)	Network Associates Coliseum	26,650	64–48	L1
113	August 8	@ Athletics	1–6	Hudson (14–6)	Castillo (7–6)	—	Network Associates Coliseum	50,863	64–49	L2
114	August 9	@ Athletics	0–6	Zito (8–7)	Wakefield (7–7)	—	Network Associates Coliseum	28,781	64–50	L3
—	August 10	@ Orioles	Postponed (rain). Makeup date October 5.							
115	August 11	@ Orioles	2–4	Towers (7–7)	Cone (7–2)	Roberts (2)	Camden Yards	48,748	64–51	L4
116	August 12	@ Orioles	12–10	Wakefield (8–7)	Johnson (10–7)	Lowe (24)	Camden Yards	48,037	65–51	W1
117	August 14	Mariners	3–6 (11)	Paniagua (4–3)	Beck (5–4)	Sasaki (37)	Fenway Park	33,790	65–52	L1
118	August 15	Mariners	2–6	García (14–4)	Castillo (7–7)	—	Fenway Park	33,186	65–53	L2
119	August 16	Mariners	6–4	Garcés (4–1)	Sele (12–4)	Urbina (16)	Fenway Park	33,548	66–53	W1
120	August 17	Orioles	5-11	Towers (8–7)	Wakefield (8–8)	—	Fenway Park	33,680	66–54	L1
121	August 18	Orioles	5–1	Garcés (5–1)	Johnson (10–8)	—	Fenway Park	31,199	67–54	W1
122	August 19	Orioles	7–13	Wasdin (3–1)	Pichardo (2–1)	—	Fenway Park	33,145	67–55	L1
123	August 20	Angels	6–1	Castillo (8–7)	Valdéz (8–7)	—	Edison Field	22,891	68–55	W1
124	August 21	@ Angels	8–5	Cone (8–2)	Schoenweis (10–9)	Urbina (17)	Edison Field	24,402	69–55	W2
125	August 22	@ Angels	2–4	Levine (7–7)	Wakefield (8–9)	Percival (36)	Edison Field	23,017	69–56	L1
126	August 23	@ Angels	7–6	Garcés (6–1)	Weber (6–2)	Urbina (18)	Edison Field	27,377	70–56	W1
127	August 24	@ Rangers	7–4	Beck (6–4)	Michalak (6–8)	Urbina (19)	The Ballpark at Arlington	45,378	71–56	W2
128	August 25	@ Rangers	7–8 (18)	Michalak (7–8)	Lowe (4–9)	—	The Ballpark at Arlington	43,775	71–57	L1
129	August 26	@ Rangers	4–5	Davis (8–8)	Wakefield (8–10)	Zimmerman (23)	The Ballpark at Arlington	26,208	71–58	L2
130	August 28	@ Indians	3–8	Burba (10–8)	Cone (8–3)	—	Jacobs Field	41,408	71–59	L3
131	August 29	@ Indians	1–2	Sabathia (14–4)	Fossum (1–1)	Wickman (25)	Jacobs Field	41,320	71–60	L4
132	August 30	@ Indians	1–3	Colón (11–10)	Nomo (11–6)	Wickman (26)	Jacobs Field	40,616	71–61	L5
133	August 31	Yankees	1–3	Clemens (18–1)	Lowe (4–10)	Rivera (42)	Fenway Park	33,501	71–62	L6

September: 6–15

#	Date	Opponent	Score	Win	Loss	Save	Stadium	Attendance	Record	Streak
134	September 1	Yankees	1–2	Hernández (1–6)	Urbina (2–2)	Rivera (43)	Fenway Park	33,084	71–63	L7
135	September 2	Yankees	0-1	Mussina (14–11)	Cone (8–4)	—	Fenway Park	33,734	71–64	L8
136	September 4	Indians	5–8	Colón (12–10)	Nomo (11–7)	Wickman (29)	Fenway Park	32,145	71–65	L9
137	September 5	Indians	10–7	Arrojo (4–3)	Woodard (3–3)	Urbina (20)	Fenway Park	32,029	72–65	W1
138	September 6	Indians	4-6	Finley (6–6)	Castillo (8–8)	Rocker (22)	Fenway Park	32,500	72–66	L1
139	September 7	@ Yankees	2–3	Hernández (2–6)	Martínez (7–3)	Rivera (45)	Yankee Stadium	55,524	72–67	L2
140	September 8	@ Yankees	2–9	Mussina (15–11)	Cone (8–5)	—	Yankee Stadium	55,316	72–68	L3
141	September 9	@ Yankees	2–7	Pettitte (15–9)	Nomo (11–8)	—	Yankee Stadium	55,318	72–69	L4
—	September 10	@ Yankees	Cancelled (rain). Not rescheduled.							
—	September 11	@ Devil Rays	Postponed (9/11 attacks). Makeup date October 1.							
—	September 12	@ Devil Rays	Postponed (9/11 attacks). Makeup date October 2.							
—	September 13	@ Devil Rays	Postponed (9/11 attacks). Makeup date October 3.							
—	September 14	@ Orioles	Postponed (9/11 attacks). Makeup date October 4.							
—	September 15	@ Orioles	Postponed (9/11 attacks). Makeup date October 5.							
—	September 16	@ Orioles	Postponed (9/11 attacks). Makeup date October 6.							
142	September 18	Devil Rays	7–2	Nomo (12–8)	Sturtze (8–12)	—	Fenway Park	30,909	73–69	W1
143	September 19	Devil Rays	2–12	Wilson (7–8)	Cone (8–6)	—	Fenway Park	29,627	73–70	L1
144	September 20	Devil Rays	2–1	Arrojo (5–3)	Creek (2–4)	Beck (6)	Fenway Park	29,530	74–70	W1
145	September 21	Tigers	5–2	Fossum (2–1)	Murray (1–5)	Urbina (21)	Fenway Park	30,905	75–70	W2
146	September 22	Tigers	3–4	Pettyjohn (1–6)	Arrojo (5–4)	Anderson (19)	Fenway Park	30,871	75–71	L1
147	September 23	Tigers	6–12	Weaver (12–15)	Nomo (12–9)	—	Fenway Park	31,333	75–72	L2
148	September 24	Orioles	1–5	Maduro (4–6)	Wakefield (8–11)	—	Fenway Park	30,114	75–73	L3
149	September 25	Orioles	7–12	Mercedes (8–17)	Castillo (8–9)	—	Fenway Park	29,726	75–74	L4
150	September 26	Orioles	9–6	Fossum (3–1)	Bauer (0–3)	Urbina (22)	Fenway Park	31,603	76–74	W1
151	September 27	Orioles	2–4	Douglass (2–1)	Wakefield (8–12)	Roberts (6)	Fenway Park	32,719	76–75	L1
152	September 28	@ Tigers	1–4	Weaver (13–15)	Nomo (12–10)	Anderson (22)	Comerica Park	32,453	76–76	L2
153	September 29	@ Tigers	2–7	Sparks (13–9)	Kim (0–2)	—	Comerica Park	30,089	76–77	L3
154	September 30	@ Tigers	8–5	Castillo (9–9)	Lima (6–11)	Urbina (23)	Comerica Park	29,229	77–77	W1

October: 5–2

#	Date	Opponent	Score	Win	Loss	Save	Stadium	Attendance	Record	Streak
155	October 1	@ Devil Rays	3–10	Sturtze (10–12)	Cone (8–7)	—	Tropicana Field	10,775	77–78	L1
156	October 2	@ Devil Rays	3–10	Wilson (8–9)	Fossum (3–2)	—	Tropicana Field	11,266	77–79	L2
157	October 3	@ Devil Rays	10–3	Lowe (5–10)	Rupe (5–12)	Wakefield (3)	Tropicana Field	10,985	78–79	W1
158	October 4	@ Orioles	5–4	Nomo (13–10)	Wasdin (3–2)	Urbina (24)	Camden Yards	43,302	79–79	W2
159	October 5 (1)	@ Orioles	5–0	Castillo (10–9)	Kohlmeier (1–2)	—	Camden Yards	46,746	80–79	W3
160	October 5 (2)	@ Orioles	7–5	Wakefield (9–12)	Roberts (9–10)	Garcés (1)	Camden Yards	47,927	81–79	W4
161	October 6	@ Orioles	5–1	Cone (9–7)	Bauer (0–5)	—	Camden Yards	48,807	82–79	W5

Note: the Red Sox only played 161 games, as a September 10 rainout against the Yankees in New York was not rescheduled.

== Awards and honors ==
- Pedro Martínez – AL Pitcher of the Month (May)
- Manny Ramirez – Silver Slugger Award (OF), AL Player of the Month (April)

All-Star Game

- Manny Ramirez, starting LF

== Farm system ==
Level	Team	League	Manager
AAA	Pawtucket Red Sox	International League	Gary Jones
AA	Trenton Thunder	Eastern League	Billy Gardner Jr.
A-Advanced	Sarasota Red Sox	Florida State League	Ron Johnson
A	Augusta GreenJackets	South Atlantic League	Mike Boulanger
A-Short Season	Lowell Spinners	New York–Penn League	Arnie Beyeler
Rookie	GCL Red Sox	Gulf Coast League	John Sanders
Rookie	DSL Red Sox	Dominican Summer League	Guadalupe Jabalera
Rookie	DSL cooperative	Dominican Summer League	
Rookie	VSL Red Sox (cooperative)	Venezuelan Summer League	

In addition to the DSL Red Sox, the team shared a DSL team with the Cleveland Indians.
VSL cooperative was with the Milwaukee Brewers and Minnesota Twins.
