= Wakeland =

Wakeland may refer to:

- Wakeland High School, a public high school located in Frisco, Texas, United States
- Bryan Wakeland, American drummer in the bands Tripping Daisy and The Polyphonic Spree
- Chris Wakeland, American baseball player
