= Pedro Santana (baseball) =

Dominican baseball player (born 1976)

- Second baseman
- Born: September 21, 1976 (age 49); San Pedro de Macorís, Dominican Republic
- Batted: Right Threw: Right

MLB debut
- July 16, 2001, for the Detroit Tigers

Last MLB appearance
- July 16, 2001, for the Detroit Tigers

MLB statistics
- Games: 1
- Plate appearances: 0
- Putouts: 1
- Stats at Baseball Reference

Teams
- Detroit Tigers (2001)

Pedro C. Santana (born September 21, 1976) is a Dominican former Major League Baseball (MLB) player who played for the Detroit Tigers in 2001. He is 5'11" and weighs 160 lbs.

== Career ==
On July 16, 2001, Santana appeared in the only game of his MLB career. He entered the game in the eighth inning as a defensive replacement at second base in place of Damion Easley and batting second in the lineup. The Tigers, who were losing to the Cincinnati Reds 9–1, batted the number four, five, six, and seven hitters in the top of the ninth inning to close out the game. Santana finished the game without a plate appearance, although he did record a putout of Reds second basemen Juan Castro to close out the eighth inning. This puts Santana in select company with other non-pitchers who appeared in a major league game but did not receive a plate appearance, such as Moonlight Graham. Santana was originally called up on July 13 when the Tigers put starting third baseman Dean Palmer on the disabled list; and was sent back down to the minors when the team activated starting shortstop Deivi Cruz on July 18.

Santana's brief appearance was notable, as the game took place in July, as opposed to later in the season when rosters expand during September call-ups. Santana was not called up that September, despite remaining on the 40-man roster.
