= Ángel Santos =

Puerto Rican baseball player (born 1979)

- Second baseman
- Born: August 14, 1979 (age 46); Río Piedras, Puerto Rico
- Batted: Switch Threw: Right

MLB debut
- September 8, 2001, for the Boston Red Sox

Last MLB appearance
- September 28, 2003, for the Cleveland Indians

MLB statistics
- Batting average: .207
- Home runs: 3
- Runs batted in: 7
- Stats at Baseball Reference

Teams
- Boston Red Sox (2001); Cleveland Indians (2003)

Ángel Ramón Santos Berrios (born August 14, 1979) is a Puerto Rican former Major League Baseball (MLB) second baseman who played with the Boston Red Sox in 2001 and Cleveland Indians in 2003.
