= Luis Pineda (baseball) =

Dominican baseball player (born 1974)

- Pitcher
- Born: October 17, 1974 (age 51); San Cristóbal, Dominican Republic
- Batted: Right Threw: Right

MLB debut
- August 4, 2001, for the Detroit Tigers

Last MLB appearance
- June 30, 2002, for the Cincinnati Reds

MLB statistics
- Earned run average: 4.44
- Innings pitched: 50 2/3
- Strikeouts: 44
- Stats at Baseball Reference

Teams
- Detroit Tigers (2001); Cincinnati Reds (2002)

Luis Pineda (born October 17, 1974) is a Dominican former Major League Baseball player who pitched for the Detroit Tigers and the Cincinnati Reds. He debuted on August 4, 2001, with the Tigers against the Oakland Athletics and had a perfect line of 1.0 IP, 0 H, 0 SO, 0 BB, 0 ER for the night. After his rookie season he was traded by the Tigers with Juan Encarnación to the Reds for Dmitri Young. His last appearance was in 2002 for Cincinnati.
