= Chris Wakeland =

American baseball player (born 1975)

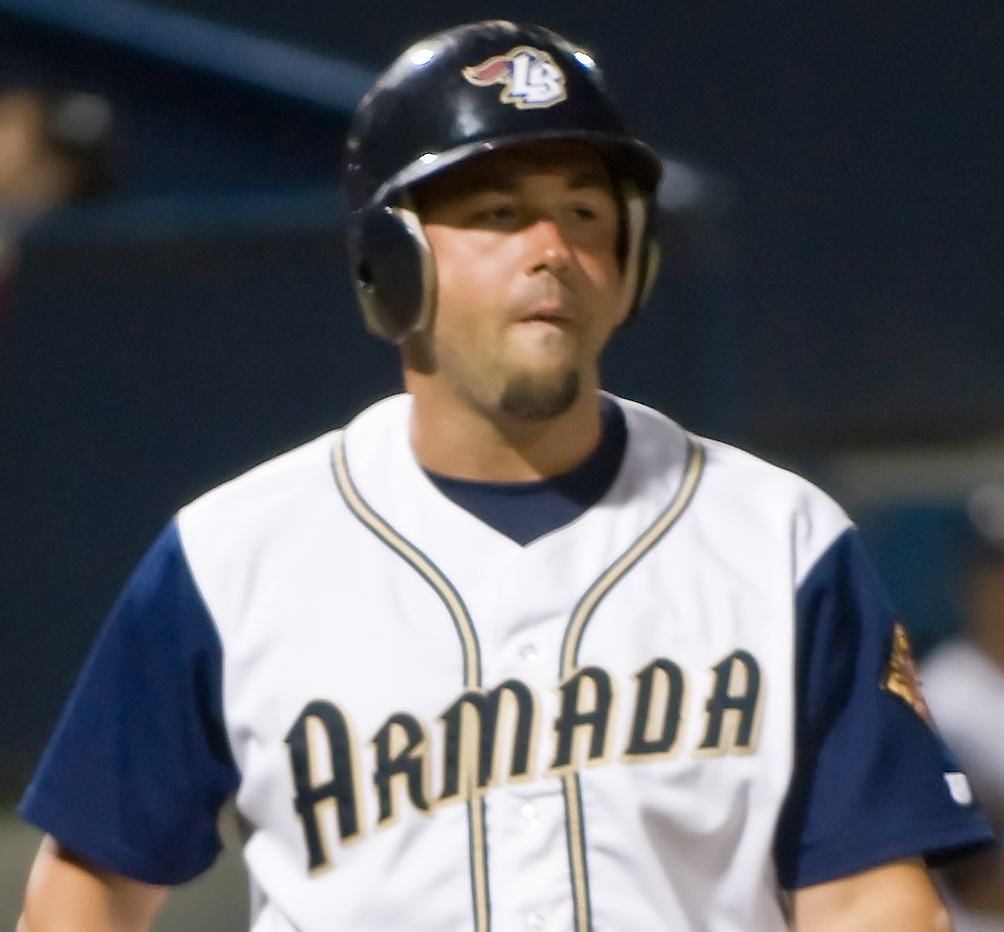
- Wakeland with the Long Beach Armada in 2007
- Outfielder
- Born: June 15, 1975 (age 51); Huntington Beach, California, U.S.
- Batted: Left Threw: Left

MLB debut
- September 4, 2001, for the Detroit Tigers

Last MLB appearance
- October 6, 2001, for the Detroit Tigers

MLB statistics
- Batting average: .250
- Home runs: 2
- Runs batted in: 6
- Stats at Baseball Reference

Teams
- Detroit Tigers (2001)

Christopher Robert Wakeland (born June 15, 1975) is an American former professional baseball player who played Major League Baseball, appearing in ten games for the Detroit Tigers in 2001.

Wakeland was drafted by the Tigers out of Oregon State University in the 15th round (431st overall) of the 1996 Major League Baseball draft.

Wakeland also played college baseball at George Fox University and was the first baseball player from that school to play in Major League Baseball.

Wakeland began his professional career with the Jamestown Jammers of the New York–Penn League in 1996. The Tigers added Wakeland to their 40-man roster in November 1999.

Before the 2000 season, Baseball America ranked Wakeland Detroit's ninth-best prospect.

He made his Major League debut on September 4, 2001 against the Chicago White Sox. He started in right field and was hitless in three plate appearances. On September 6, he picked up his first hit and run batted in on a fifth inning single against Matt Ginter which drove in Shane Halter. On September 18, he hit a home run against Brad Radke of the Minnesota Twins, the first home run of is career. He appeared in his tenth and final Major League game on October 6, 2001.

The Florida Marlins signed Wakeland to a minor league contract in November 2002.

Wakeland finished his professional baseball career with four seasons in independent baseball leagues from 2004 until 2007.
