= José Lima =

Dominican baseball player (1972–2010)

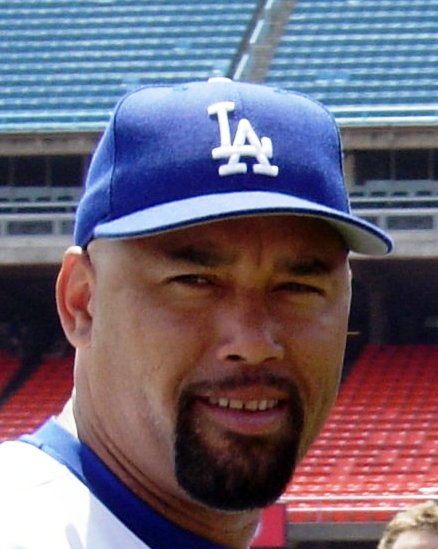
- Lima in 2004
- Pitcher
- Born: September 30, 1972; Santiago, Dominican Republic
- Died: May 23, 2010 (aged 37); Pasadena, California, U.S.
- Batted: Right Threw: Right

Professional debut
- MLB: April 20, 1994, for the Detroit Tigers
- KBO: March 29, 2008, for the Kia Tigers

Last appearance
- MLB: July 7, 2006, for the New York Mets
- KBO: June 25, 2008, for the Kia Tigers

MLB statistics
- Win–loss record: 89–102
- Earned run average: 5.26
- Strikeouts: 980

KBO statistics
- Win–loss record: 3–6
- Earned run average: 4.89
- Strikeouts: 28
- Stats at Baseball Reference

Teams
- Detroit Tigers (1994–1996); Houston Astros (1997–2001); Detroit Tigers (2001–2002); Kansas City Royals (2003); Los Angeles Dodgers (2004); Kansas City Royals (2005); New York Mets (2006); Kia Tigers (2008)

Career highlights and awards
- All-Star (1999)

José Desiderio Rodriguez Lima (September 30, 1972 – May 23, 2010) was a Dominican right-handed pitcher who spent 13 seasons in Major League Baseball (MLB) with the Detroit Tigers (1994–1996, 2001–2002), Houston Astros (1997–2001), Kansas City Royals (2003, 2005), Los Angeles Dodgers (2004) and New York Mets (2006). His best year in the majors was 1999, when he won 21 games for the Astros and pitched in his only All-Star Game.

His remarkably animated displays of emotion on the mound made him a fan favorite, but also drew the ire of opposing teams. He was known for his flamboyant celebrations after his victories in the face of opponents. Due to his indulging in musical pursuits beyond baseball, he was once described by The New York Times sportswriter Ben Shpigel as "the national anthem-crooning, towel-waving merengue singer who moonlights as a right-handed pitcher".

== MLB career ==
Lima made his Major League debut with the Detroit Tigers on April 20, 1994, at age 21, making a start against the Kansas City Royals. After three years in Detroit, he was traded to the Houston Astros on December 10, 1996, in an eight-player trade. In 1999, he compiled a record of 21–10 and was named to the National League All Star Team that season. However, in 2000, Lima struggled to recapture his success, losing 16 games and recording a league-worst 6.65 earned run average and 48 home runs, the latter of which was only two short of the single season record held by Bert Blyleven.

On June 23, 2001, Lima was traded back to Detroit in exchange for Dave Mlicki. He was released by Detroit during the 2002 season, proclaiming at the time, "If I can't pitch on this team—the worst or second-worst team in baseball—where am I going to pitch? If I can't start on this ballclub, I must be the worst pitcher on Earth."

Lima pitched for the Newark Bears in the Independent Atlantic League early in 2003, but returned to MLB in June 2003, when he was acquired by the Kansas City Royals. Lima started off fast in Kansas City, compiling a record of 7–0 with a 2.17 ERA after eight starts. A groin injury during his ninth start caused his performance to decline significantly, and he went 1–3 with a 10.65 ERA in his last six starts.

Lima joined the Los Angeles Dodgers in 2004. With the Dodgers, Lima was 13–5 with a 4.07 ERA, his best performance since the 1999 season. Possibly the best moment of his career came on October 9, 2004, in Game Three of the 2004 National League Division Series, when he pitched a five-hit shutout against the St. Louis Cardinals. It was the Dodgers' first post-season victory since Game Five of the 1988 World Series. In 2005, Lima returned to Kansas City as a free agent but managed only to compile a record of 5–16, while posting a 6.99 ERA and was not re-signed by the club.

On February 14, 2006, Lima was inked to a minor league deal by the Mets and pitched for the Mets' AAA affiliate, the Norfolk Tides. He was called up to the Mets on May 7, 2006, and went 0–3 with an 8.79 ERA in three starts before being designated for assignment on May 20, 2006. On July 4, 2006, Lima was again recalled by the Mets, when Heath Bell was optioned back to the Norfolk Tides. Lima had another poor outing, on July 7, 2006, against the Florida Marlins, which included surrendering a grand slam to opposing pitcher Dontrelle Willis, and was removed from the game. After the game, Lima was designated for assignment back to the Norfolk Tides for the second time during the 2006 season. Lima finished the 2006 season with a 0–4 record with a 9.87 ERA in four total starts for the Mets. In the Dominican Winter Baseball League, he played for the Águilas Cibaeñas. In 2007, Lima also played for Saraperos de Saltillo in the Mexican League.

== Korea Professional Baseball ==
For the 2008 season, Lima signed with the Kia Tigers, a nine-time champion in the Korea Professional Baseball. Despite high expectations as a former MLB pitcher, Lima struggled in several starts, after which he was sent down to the Korea Baseball Futures League. Many in the media reported that Lima would be released from the Tigers. However, after returning to the Tigers, Lima got two consecutive wins against the Woori Heroes by pitching seven innings while not allowing a single run, and the Hanwha Eagles, pitching five innings and allowing just three runs, but was still released by the Tigers.

== Golden Baseball League ==
Lima signed with the Long Beach Armada of the independent Golden Baseball League (GBL) on March 27, 2009. He was to play under veteran minor league manager and former major league all-star Garry Templeton. Lima was traded by the Armada to the Edmonton Capitals for former Chicago White Sox first-round draft pick Kris Honel on July 31, 2009. During a May visit to Edmonton with the Long Beach Armada, Lima was heartily embraced by the Capitals' fans and even had a local fan club develop at the ballpark—a first ever for a visiting player there. He pitched a total of four games for the Capitals, going 1–2 in the regular season and losing his only GBL playoff appearance.

== Personal life ==
Lima had at least six children with at least six different mothers. He was married twice.

=== Death ===
Lima died on the morning of May 23, 2010, at age 37. He was rushed to Huntington Memorial Hospital, where he was pronounced dead. An autopsy did not determine the cause of death, but stated that due to the condition of his heart, he likely died of a cardiac arrhythmia. The autopsy also showed that there were no drugs in his system at the time of his death. Lima suffered from cardiac problems. Lima was buried in Cementerio Las Charcas in Santiago.

On July 12, 2010, David Ortiz paid tribute to his late friend by dedicating his victory in the 2010 Major League Baseball Home Run Derby to Lima.

== See also ==
- Houston Astros award winners and league leaders
- List of Houston Astros team records
- List of Major League Baseball players from the Dominican Republic
