= James Lofton (baseball) =

American baseball player (born 1974)

- Shortstop
- Born: March 6, 1974 (age 52); Los Angeles, California, U.S.
- Batted: Both Threw: Right

MLB debut
- September 19, 2001, for the Boston Red Sox

Last MLB appearance
- October 5, 2001, for the Boston Red Sox

MLB statistics
- Batting average: .192
- Home runs: 0
- Runs batted in: 1
- Stats at Baseball Reference

Teams
- Boston Red Sox (2001)

James O'Neal Lofton (born March 6, 1974) is an American former shortstop in Major League Baseball who played briefly for the Boston Red Sox during the 2001 season. Listed at 5' 9", 170 lb., he was a switch-hitter and threw right-handed.

In an eight-game career, Lofton was a .192 hitter (5-for-26) with one run, one double, one RBI, and two stolen bases. In seven fielding appearances, he committed two errors in 25 chances for a .920 fielding percentage.

Lofton also played in the Boston, Baltimore and Cincinnati minor league systems (1993–2007), as well as in several independent leagues. He was named an All-Star in the Pioneer (1994) and Western (2000) leagues. In 14 minor league seasons, he was a .271 hitter with 57 home runs and 533 RBI in 1,264 games.

Lofton has two daughters Jasmine Lofton and Jamie Lofton.
