= Matt Miller (baseball, born 1974) =

American baseball player

- Pitcher
- Born: August 2, 1974 (age 50); Lubbock, Texas
- Batted: Left Threw: Left

MLB debut
- May 8, 2001, for the Detroit Tigers

Last MLB appearance
- April 4, 2002, for the Detroit Tigers

MLB statistics
- Win–loss record: 0–0
- Earned run average: 7.84
- Strikeouts: 7
- Stats at Baseball Reference

Teams
- Detroit Tigers (2001–2002)

Matthew Lincoln Miller (born August 2, 1974) is a former left-handed Major League Baseball pitcher who played for the Detroit Tigers in 2001 and 2002.

Miller attended Monterey High School before attending Texas Tech University, both in Lubbock, Texas. In the 1996 draft, Miller was drafted in the 2nd round by the Detroit Tigers. Miller played collegiately with the Texas Tech Red Raiders baseball team. In 1994 and 1995, he played collegiate summer baseball with the Wareham Gatemen of the Cape Cod Baseball League, and returned to the league in 1996 to play with the Hyannis Mets.

He made his major league debut May 8, 2001, for the Tigers against the Texas Rangers.
