= Heath Murray =

American baseball player (born 1973)

- Pitcher
- Born: April 19, 1973 (age 53); Troy, Ohio
- Batted: Left Threw: Left

MLB debut
- May 24, 1997, for the San Diego Padres

Last MLB appearance
- July 21, 2002, for the Cleveland Indians

MLB statistics
- Win–loss record: 2-15
- Earned run average: 6.41
- Strikeouts: 94
- Stats at Baseball Reference

Teams
- San Diego Padres (1997, 1999); Detroit Tigers (2001); Cleveland Indians (2002)

Heath Robertson Murray (born April 19, 1973) is an American former professional baseball player. Murray pitched in Major League Baseball for the San Diego Padres (1997 and 1999), Detroit Tigers (2001), and Cleveland Indians (2002).

He played college baseball for Michigan, and in 1993 he played collegiate summer baseball with the Harwich Mariners of the Cape Cod Baseball League.

The Padres drafted Murray in the third round of the 1994 MLB draft.

He is a pitching coach for his high school alma mater, Troy High School.

He currently runs his own insurance agency in Troy, Ohio, and is a State Farm insurance agent.
