= Chris Holt (pitcher) =

American baseball player (born 1971)

- Pitcher
- Born: September 18, 1971 (age 54); Dallas, Texas, U.S.
- Batted: Right Threw: Right

Professional debut
- MLB: September 1, 1996, for the Houston Astros
- NPB: June 11, 2002, for the Yokohama BayStars

Last appearance
- MLB: October 2, 2001, for the Detroit Tigers
- NPB: August 13, 2003, for the Yokohama BayStars

MLB statistics
- Win–loss record: 28–51
- Earned run average: 4.76
- Strikeouts: 426

NPB statistics
- Win–loss record: 11–24
- Earned run average: 4.13
- Strikeouts: 170
- Stats at Baseball Reference

Teams
- Houston Astros (1996–1997, 1999–2000); Detroit Tigers (2001); Yokohama BayStars (2002–2003)

Christopher Michael Holt (born September 18, 1971) is an American former professional baseball player. He played Major League Baseball (MLB) as a pitcher for the Houston Astros and Detroit Tigers. He also pitched two seasons in Japan for the Yokohama BayStars.

== Career ==
Holt made his major-league debut in 1996, appearing in four games. The following season, he had an 8–12 win–loss record with a career low 3.52 earned run average (ERA) in 209 2/3 innings pitched. He missed the 1998 season due to injury and came back in 1999. Holt was not as effective as in his rookie season, posting a record of 5–13 in 32 games (26 starts). On April 28, 2000, he tossed a one-hitter against the Milwaukee Brewers. For the 2000 season, Holt tied a career-high in wins with eight, but posted an ERA of 5.35 while losing 16 games. He also struck out a career high 136 batters.

For the 2001 season, Holt signed a one-year deal with the Detroit Tigers. Holt's ineffectiveness continued as he posted a career worst ERA of 5.77 in 30 games (22 starts).

After pitching one season with Detroit, Holt played in Nippon Professional Baseball (NPB) for the Yokohama BayStars during 2002 and 2003.
