= Sean Lowe (baseball) =

American baseball player (born 1971)

- Pitcher
- Born: March 29, 1971 (age 55); Dallas, Texas, U.S.
- Batted: Right Threw: Right

MLB debut
- August 29, 1997, for the St. Louis Cardinals

Last MLB appearance
- July 30, 2003, for the Kansas City Royals

MLB statistics
- Win–loss record: 23–15
- Earned run average: 4.95
- Strikeouts: 288
- Stats at Baseball Reference

Teams
- St. Louis Cardinals (1997–1998); Chicago White Sox (1999–2001); Pittsburgh Pirates (2002); Colorado Rockies (2002); Kansas City Royals (2003)

Jonathan Sean Lowe (born March 29, 1971) is an American former pitcher in Major League Baseball who played from 1997 through 2003 for the St. Louis Cardinals, Chicago White Sox, Pittsburgh Pirates, Colorado Rockies and Kansas City Royals.

Lowe attended Mesquite High School in Mesquite, Texas, where he graduated in 1989.

Lowe was drafted by the Cardinals in the first round (15th pick) of the 1992 Major League Baseball draft. Lowe finished his seven-year MLB career with a 23–15 record, a 4.95 ERA and 288 strikeouts. He was primarily used in middle relief during his career.

Besides, Lowe played his first professional season with their Class A (Short Season) Hamilton Redbirds in 1992, and his last with the Triple-A Omaha Royals in 2003. Lowe's unique spot in baseball immortality occurred on 16 June 2001, against the St. Louis Cardinals, when Albert Pujols recorded his first, and what may yet be his only, sacrifice bunt against Lowe.
