= Chris George (left-handed pitcher) =

American baseball player (born 1979)

- Pitcher
- Born: September 16, 1979 (age 46); Houston, Texas, U.S.
- Batted: Left Threw: Left

MLB debut
- July 26, 2001, for the Kansas City Royals

Last MLB appearance
- September 30, 2004, for the Kansas City Royals

MLB statistics
- Win–loss record: 14–20
- Earned run average: 6.48
- Strikeouts: 99
- Stats at Baseball Reference

Teams
- Kansas City Royals (2001–2004)
Medals
Men's baseball
Representing United States
Olympic Games
Gold medal – first place	2000 Sydney	Team

Christopher Coleman George (born September 16, 1979) is an American former Major League Baseball pitcher. He played most of his career with Kansas City Royals (2001–2004). He was a first round draft pick by the Royals in 1998.

From 2006–2007, George pitched for the Florida Marlins Triple-A affiliate, the Albuquerque Isotopes. George signed with the Colorado Rockies on December 22, 2007, and was assigned to Triple-A Colorado Springs. He was released by the Rockies on June 17. Shortly after his release, George signed with the Toronto Blue Jays and was assigned to their Triple-A affiliate, the Syracuse Chiefs. He last played in 2012 with the Norfolk Tides.
