= Danny Patterson =

American baseball player (born 1971)

- Pitcher
- Born: February 17, 1971 (age 55); San Gabriel, California, U.S.
- Batted: Right Threw: Right

MLB debut
- July 26, 1996, for the Texas Rangers

Last MLB appearance
- August 1, 2004, for the Detroit Tigers

MLB statistics
- Win–loss record: 24–22
- Earned run average: 4.14
- Strikeouts: 250
- Stats at Baseball Reference

Teams
- Texas Rangers (1996–1999); Detroit Tigers (2000–2004)

Danny Shane Patterson (born February 17, 1971) is an American former relief pitcher in Major League Baseball who played for the Texas Rangers (1996–1999) and the Detroit Tigers (2000–2004).

In his career, he is 24–22 with a 4.14 ERA, 250 strikeouts, 112 walks, 9 saves, in 384.1 innings pitched. His best season was in 1997 with the Texas Rangers, where he went 10–6 with a 3.42 ERA. He also walked 23 batters and struck out 69, while also picking up one save.

He was a part of a big trade on November 2, 1999, where the Texas Rangers traded Patterson, Juan González and Gregg Zaun to the Detroit Tigers for Justin Thompson, Francisco Cordero, Gabe Kapler, Bill Haselman, Frank Catalanotto and minor leaguer Alan Webb.

He then signed several minor-league contracts with the San Diego Padres (1-18-05) and the St. Louis Cardinals (8-15-04).

Patterson went to college at Cerritos Junior College in Norwalk, California. He and wife Francine reside in Scottsdale, Arizona with their two children.

Before being drafted to the Texas Rangers, Patterson was a pitcher for the Tulsa Drillers in the early to mid 1990s. At the time, the Tulsa Drillers were owned by the Texas Rangers before being bought by the Houston Astros.

== Sources ==
- Career statistics from Baseball Reference · Retrosheet · Baseball Almanac
