= Deivi Cruz =

Dominican baseball player (born 1972)

- Shortstop
- Born: November 6, 1972 (age 52); Nizao, Dominican Republic
- Batted: Right Threw: Right

MLB debut
- April 11, 1997, for the Detroit Tigers

Last MLB appearance
- October 2, 2005, for the Washington Nationals

MLB statistics
- Batting average: .269
- Home runs: 70
- Runs batted in: 464
- Stats at Baseball Reference

Teams
- Detroit Tigers (1997–2001); San Diego Padres (2002); Baltimore Orioles (2003); San Francisco Giants (2004–2005); Washington Nationals (2005)

Deivi Cruz Garcia (born November 6, 1972) is a Dominican former professional baseball shortstop. He was born in Bani, Nizao, Dominican Republic.

Cruz played at the Major League Baseball level for nine seasons (1997-2005) with the Detroit Tigers, San Diego Padres, Baltimore Orioles, San Francisco Giants, and Washington Nationals. In 1,234 career games, Cruz had a .269 batting average with 70 home runs and 464 runs batted in.

In 1997, Deivi Cruz made his Major League debut on April 1, 1997 and was honored as Tigers Rookie of the Year. Cruz was the starting shortstop for Detroit Tigers.

Cruz was released by the St. Louis Cardinals on March 30, 2006, and signed with the Bridgeport Bluefish on June 10, 2006.

Cruz' nephew, Yeyson Yrizarri, is also a professional baseball shortstop.
