= Matt Ginter =

American baseball player (born 1977)

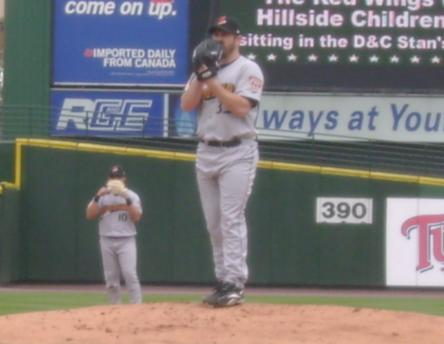
- Pitcher
- Born: December 24, 1977 (age 48); Winchester, Kentucky, U.S.
- Batted: Right Threw: Right

MLB debut
- September 1, 2000, for the Chicago White Sox

Last MLB appearance
- August 3, 2008, for the Cleveland Indians

MLB statistics
- Win–loss record: 5–7
- Earned run average: 5.43
- Strikeouts: 132
- Stats at Baseball Reference

Teams
- Chicago White Sox (2000–2003); New York Mets (2004); Detroit Tigers (2005); Cleveland Indians (2008)

Matthew Shane Ginter (born December 24, 1977) is an American former professional baseball pitcher. He played in Major League Baseball (MLB) for the Chicago White Sox, New York Mets, Detroit Tigers, and Cleveland Indians.

Ginter was originally drafted out of high school by the New York Yankees in the 17th round (509th overall) of the 1996 Major League Baseball draft, but opted to attend college at Mississippi State. He was later drafted in the first round (22nd overall) of the 1999 Major League Baseball draft by the Chicago White Sox. He made his Major League Baseball debut with the White Sox on September 1, 2000, earning the win after tossing a scoreless eighth inning in a 9–8 win over the Anaheim Angels. Ginter then spent the next three seasons splitting time between Chicago and the minor leagues, appearing in a career-high 33 games in 2002.

On March 27, 2004, Ginter was traded to the New York Mets in exchange for outfielder Timo Pérez. He made his first career start on May 16 against the Houston Astros, allowing two runs (one earned) on eight hits in 5 2/3 innings, earning a no-decision. He also recorded his first major league hit in the game off Roger Clemens. Ginter finished the season 1–3 with a 4.54 ERA in 15 games (14 starts).

On April 2, 2005, Ginter was traded to the Detroit Tigers for left-handed pitcher Steve Colyer. He made 14 appearances (one start) with the Tigers in 2005, going 0–1 with a 6.17 ERA.

Ginter signed a minor league contract with the Boston Red Sox on February 1, 2006. He began the season with the Triple-A Pawtucket Red Sox, and had a strong start to the season, notably pitching eight innings of two-hit shutout baseball on April 23. This start lowered his season ERA to 2.35 and his K/BB rate to 7. He was a strong candidate to be called up to the Red Sox to join the starting rotation, temporarily, while David Wells recovered from a knee injury. On July 1, Ginter exercised an out clause in his contract and became a free agent. At the time, he was 3–9 with a 3.64 ERA in 15 starts for Pawtucket. On July 9, Ginter signed with the Pittsburgh Pirates. He spent the remainder of the season with the Triple-A Indianapolis Indians, going 2–5 with one save and a 5.50 ERA.

On February 12, 2007, Ginter signed with the St. Louis Cardinals. Ginter began the 2007 season with the Triple-A Memphis Redbirds, posting a 2–6 record with two saves and a 4.06 ERA in 31 games (eight starts) before being released on August 17. He was later signed by the Milwaukee Brewers on September 1, and was assigned to their Triple-A affiliate, the Nashville Sounds. He became a free agent after the season.

On December 21, 2007, the Cleveland Indians signed Ginter to a minor league contract with an invitation to spring training. The Indians called Ginter up to start on July 12, 2008. In his first major league appearance in three years, Ginter went five shutout innings with five strikeouts to record the win. After spending time on the disabled list, Ginter was sent outright to the minors on August 25 and became a free agent at the end of the season. In January 2009, he signed a minor league contract with the Milwaukee Brewers. He filed for free agency after the season.

He is not related to Keith Ginter, an infielder for MLB from 2000 to 2005.
