= Willis Roberts =

Dominican baseball player (born 1975)

- Pitcher
- Born: June 19, 1975 (age 50); San Cristóbal, Dominican Republic
- Batted: Right Threw: Right

MLB debut
- July 2, 1999, for the Detroit Tigers

Last MLB appearance
- August 13, 2004, for the Pittsburgh Pirates

MLB statistics
- Win–loss record: 17–15
- Earned run average: 4.64
- Strikeouts: 179
- Stats at Baseball Reference

Teams
- Detroit Tigers (1999); Cincinnati Reds (2000); Baltimore Orioles (2001–2003); Pittsburgh Pirates (2004)

Willis Augusto Roberts (born June 19, 1975) is a Dominican former pitcher in Major League Baseball, born in San Cristobal, Dominican Republic. He batted and threw right-handed.

== Career ==
Roberts was signed by the Detroit Tigers as an amateur free agent in 1992. He remained with the Tigers organization from 1992 to 1999. He made it to the major leagues in 1999 and played for the Detroit Tigers, Cincinnati Reds, Baltimore Orioles and Pittsburgh Pirates until 2004.

Roberts made his major league debut on July 2, 1999, with the Detroit Tigers against the Minnesota Twins at Hubert H. Humphrey Metrodome with 12,033 people attending the game. Roberts relieved Will Brunson in the sixth inning, pitching one and one-third innings. The Tigers lost the game 11–4.

Roberts was released by the Tigers on February 1, 2000, and immediately joined the Cincinnati Reds as a free agent. Roberts was granted free agency on October 18 and signed with the Orioles on November 16. In the 2002 baseball season, Roberts was most successful in limiting home runs, only allowing five home runs in 75 innings. His home run rate was roughly one home run allowed for every eighteen innings pitched, or 0.6 home runs per nine innings. Roberts played three seasons for the Orioles before being granted free agency on October 17, 2003. On January 20, 2004, Roberts signed with the Pittsburgh Pirates as a free agent. He played his final baseball game with the Pittsburgh Pirates on August 13, 2004, retiring just seven days later. The New York Mets brought Roberts in on a minor league deal prior to the 2005 season, but he did not play for them.
