= Matt Anderson (baseball) =

American baseball player (born 1976)

- Pitcher
- Born: August 17, 1976 (age 49); Louisville, Kentucky, U.S.
- Batted: Right Threw: Right

MLB debut
- June 25, 1998, for the Detroit Tigers

Last MLB appearance
- July 1, 2005, for the Colorado Rockies

MLB statistics
- Win–loss record: 15–7
- Earned run average: 5.19
- Strikeouts: 224
- Stats at Baseball Reference

Teams
- Detroit Tigers (1998–2003); Colorado Rockies (2005)

Matthew Jason Anderson (born August 17, 1976) is an American former Major League Baseball (MLB) relief pitcher. The first overall pick in the 1997 MLB draft, he played for the Detroit Tigers and Colorado Rockies between 1998 and 2005.

== Early life and college career ==
Anderson attended St. Xavier High School, which was also attended by MLB players Paul Byrd, Chris Burke, and Jack Savage. After high school, he went on to Rice University. In 1995, Anderson was a Southwest Conference all-star. In 1996, he played collegiate summer baseball with the Chatham A's of the Cape Cod Baseball League, and was named the league's top pro prospect. In 1997 he was a Western Athletic Conference all-star and a First Team College All-American. Anderson set Rice University records for career wins (30) and saves (14), and also posted a 1.82 earned run average (ERA) during his final year with the team. In the 1997 amateur entry draft, Anderson was selected first overall by the Detroit Tigers. He eventually signed with the team for a $2.5 million signing bonus.

== Professional career ==
Anderson was named the 24th best prospect in 1998 by Baseball America. In 1998, he was called up by the Tigers from the minors, where he had an ERA under 0.70. In his first Major League season, he went 5–1 with a 3.27 ERA in 42 games. He also struck out 44 batters in 44 innings pitched. Anderson's numbers were never again as impressive as those of his rookie season, although he was able to record 22 saves (with a 4.82 ERA) in 2001.

In May 2002, Anderson tore a muscle in the armpit of his throwing arm while throwing a bullpen session. Earlier the same day, he had participated in a Tigers-sponsored fan octopus-throwing contest along with Jeff Weaver, leading to the perception (though disputed by Anderson) that he'd torn the muscle in hopes of winning Detroit Red Wings playoff tickets. After returning from the injury, he was unable to hit 90 mph on his fastball in his remaining days in Detroit, after regularly topping 100 mph on the radar gun, including a high mark of 103 mph twice.

After spending all of 2004 in AAA for the Tigers, Anderson made his final appearances in the bigs in 2005. Anderson walked 11 batters and gave up 19 hits in 10 innings with the Colorado Rockies that season.

Anderson started the 2006 season with the Triple-A Fresno Grizzlies in the San Francisco Giants organization. After going 1–2 with a 9.17 ERA in 29 games in relief with them, he was released by the Giants and signed with the Bridgeport Bluefish of the independent Atlantic League, where he went 1–1 with a 4.11 ERA in 15 games.

After not pitching at all in 2007, he was signed to a minor league contract with a non-roster invitation to spring training for 2008 by the Chicago White Sox. He did not make the team and pitched for the Charlotte Knights, the White Sox's Triple-A team.

On January 14, 2011, Anderson signed a minor league contract with the Philadelphia Phillies. On April 2, 2011, he was released.
