= Adam Pettyjohn =

American baseball player (born 1977)

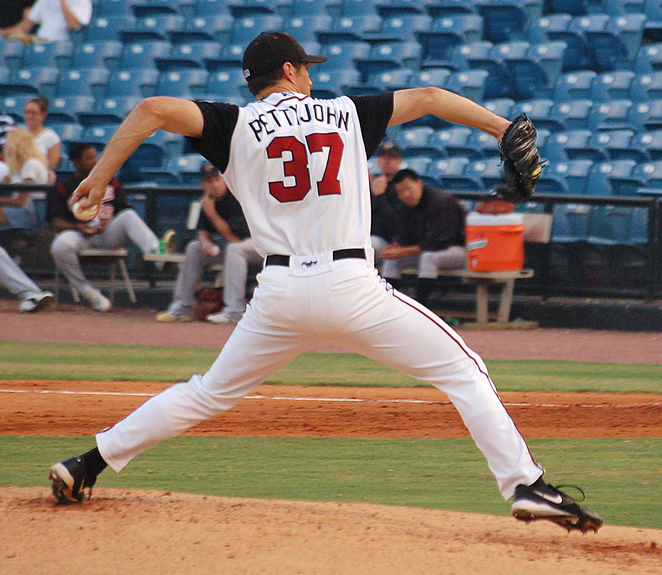
- Pettyjohn with the Nashville Sounds
- Pitcher
- Born: June 11, 1977 (age 49); Phoenix, Arizona, U.S.
- Batted: Right Threw: Left

MLB debut
- July 16, 2001, for the Detroit Tigers

Last MLB appearance
- September 28, 2008, for the Cincinnati Reds

MLB statistics
- Win–loss record: 1–7
- Earned run average: 6.65
- Strikeouts: 41
- Stats at Baseball Reference

Teams
- Detroit Tigers (2001); Cincinnati Reds (2008)

Adam Christopher Pettyjohn (born June 11, 1977) is an American former professional baseball relief pitcher. He played in Major League Baseball (MLB) for the Detroit Tigers and Cincinnati Reds. Listed at 6 feet 3 inches (1.91 m) and 190 pounds (86 kg) during his playing career, he batted right-handed and threw left-handed.

== Biography ==
Pettyjohn attended Exeter Union High School in California and then Fresno State University, where he was a teammate of pitcher Jeff Weaver.

In 1998, Pettyjohn was drafted by the Detroit Tigers in the second round (73rd overall). He signed for a $392,500 bonus. Pettyjohn spent less than three years in Minor League Baseball before reaching the major leagues, posting an ERA as low as 1.97. On July 16, 2001, he made his MLB debut at the age of 24, wearing jersey number 57. His first major-league strikeout came against Ken Griffey Jr.

In 2002, Pettyjohn did not play professionally because he had to undergo a colectomy due to ulcerative colitis. In 2003, he played in the Detroit Tigers organization. He was released by the Tigers on March 28, 2004. He spent 2004 playing for the San Francisco Giants and Oakland Athletics organizations. He spent the 2005 season and the start of the 2006 season with the Long Beach Armada of the Golden Baseball League before spending time again with the Athletics as well as the Seattle Mariners organizations.

Pettyjohn signed a minor-league contract with the Milwaukee Brewers on December 12, 2006. He started the 2007 season with the Huntsville Stars of the Southern League, Milwaukee's Double-A affiliate. As the opening day starter for the Stars on April 5, 2007, Pettyjohn gave up four hits, two earned runs, and a walk while striking out seven and getting a no-decision in the team's 4–3 victory over the Mississippi Braves. On June 1, he was promoted to the Triple-A Nashville Sounds. He led Triple-A that season with 15 wins and was named the best left-handed pitcher in Triple-A as well as being on the Pacific Coast League All Star team.

Pettyjohn agreed to terms with the Cincinnati Reds on a minor-league contract on January 4, 2008. He played for their Triple-A affiliate, the Louisville Bats, until their season finished and was a September call up for the Reds, marking the first time he had been in the majors since 2001. He began the 2009 season with Louisville, before being released in late July. He was then signed to a minor-league contract by the New York Mets. He pitched for the Buffalo Bisons through the 2010 season. Pettyjohn filed for free agency after the 2010 season.

Pettyjohn pitched for Team USA in 1997. Pettyjohn and his wife, Deanna, reside in Visalia, California with their two kids.

== See also ==
- List of people diagnosed with ulcerative colitis
