= Dave Mlicki =

American baseball player (born 1968)

- Pitcher
- Born: June 8, 1968 (age 58); Cleveland, Ohio, U.S.
- Batted: Right Threw: Right

MLB debut
- September 12, 1992, for the Cleveland Indians

Last MLB appearance
- September 23, 2002, for the Houston Astros

MLB statistics
- Win–loss record: 66–80
- Earned run average: 4.72
- Strikeouts: 834
- Stats at Baseball Reference

Teams
- Cleveland Indians (1992–1993); New York Mets (1995–1998); Los Angeles Dodgers (1998–1999); Detroit Tigers (1999–2001); Houston Astros (2001–2002)

David John Mlicki (/məˈlɪkiː/ mə-LIK-ee; born June 8, 1968) is an American former right-handed pitcher in Major League Baseball (MLB). Between 1992 and 2002, he played for the Cleveland Indians, New York Mets, Los Angeles Dodgers, Detroit Tigers, and Houston Astros.

== Career ==
After attending Oklahoma State University, he was selected by the Cleveland Indians in the 17th round of the 1990 amateur draft. Mlicki was primarily a starting pitcher in the major leagues, but did earn one major league save. On June 21, 1996, he pitched 3 shutout innings to nail down a 9–4 victory over the Reds, saving the win for middle reliever Jerry Dipoto.

On June 16, 1997, he led the New York Mets to a 6–0 win over the New York Yankees at Yankee Stadium in the first ever non-exhibition game played between the two teams, pitching a complete game shutout. On October 10, 2001, he made his only postseason appearance, being credited with the loss in Game 2 of the National League Division Series despite not giving up an earned run in the five innings he pitched. Mlicki failed to make the Milwaukee Brewers roster during spring training in 2003, and retired shortly afterward.
