= 2001 Cleveland Indians season =

2001 Cleveland Indians
- American League Central champions
- League: American League
- Division: Central
- Ballpark: Jacobs Field
- City: Cleveland, Ohio
- Record: 91–71 (.562)
- Divisional place: 1st
- Owners: Larry Dolan
- General managers: John Hart
- Managers: Charlie Manuel
- Television: WUAB; Jack Corrigan, Mike Hegan; FSN Ohio; John Sanders, Rick Manning
- Radio: WTAM; Tom Hamilton, Matt Underwood, Mike Hegan

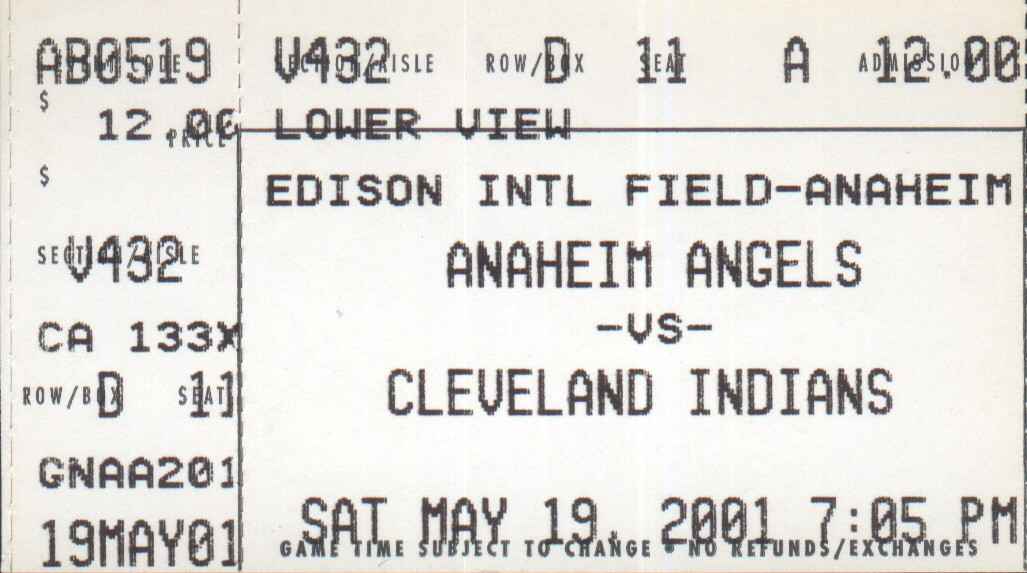
A ticket for a 2001 game between the Cleveland Indians and Anaheim Angels.

The 2001 Cleveland Indians season was the 101st season for the franchise and the 8th season at Jacobs Field.

== Offseason ==
- December 28, 2000: Fausto Carmona was signed by the Indians as an amateur free agent.
- January 9, 2001: Juan González was signed as a free agent by the Indians.

== Regular season ==
- August 5, 2001: **The Impossible Return** – Notably, the Indians tied a Major League Baseball record by erasing a 12-run Seattle lead. Thus, despite its relatively low-profile as a regular season match, the game is vividly remembered and beloved around Cleveland today.

**The Fans** Retired 2001

The number 455 was honored after the Indians sold out 455 consecutive games between 1995 and 2001, an MLB record at the time, subsequently broken by the Boston Red Sox on September 8, 2008.

=== Season standings ===
AL Central
Team	W	L	Pct.	GB	Home	Road
Cleveland Indians	91	71	.562	—	44‍–‍36	47‍–‍35
Minnesota Twins	85	77	.525	6	47‍–‍34	38‍–‍43
Chicago White Sox	83	79	.512	8	46‍–‍35	37‍–‍44
Detroit Tigers	66	96	.407	25	37‍–‍44	29‍–‍52
Kansas City Royals	65	97	.401	26	35‍–‍46	30‍–‍51

=== Record vs. opponents ===
2001 American League record Source: MLB Standings Grid – 2001
Team	ANA	BAL	BOS	CWS	CLE	DET	KC	MIN	NYY	OAK	SEA	TB	TEX	TOR	NL
Anaheim	—	4–5	4–3	6–3	5–4	5–4	5–4	3–6	4–3	6–14	4–15	7–2	7–12	5–4	10–8
Baltimore	5–4	—	9–10	3–4	1–5	4–2	5–2	3–3	5–13–1	2–7	1–8	10–9	2–7	7–12	6–12
Boston	3–4	10–9	—	3–3	3–6	4–5	3–3	3–3	5–13	4–5	3–6	14–5	5–2	12–7	10–8
Chicago	3–6	4–3	3–3	—	10–9	13–6	14–5	5–14	1–5	1–8	2–7	5–2	7–2	3–3	12–6
Cleveland	4–5	5–1	6–3	9–10	—	13–6	11–8	14–5	4–5	4–3	2–5	5–1	5–4	2–4	7–11
Detroit	4–5	2–4	5–4	6–13	6–13	—	8–11	4–15	4–5	1–6	2–5	4–2	8–1	2–4	10–8
Kansas City	4–5	2–5	3–3	5–14	8–11	11–8	—	6–13	0–6	3–6	3–6	4–2	4–5	4–3	8–10
Minnesota	6–3	3–3	3–3	14–5	5–14	15–4	13–6	—	4–2	5–4	1–8	1–6	4–5	2–5	9–9
New York	3–4	13–5–1	13–5	5–1	5–4	5–4	6–0	2–4	—	3–6	3–6	13–6	3–4	11–8	10–8
Oakland	14–6	7–2	5–4	8–1	3–4	6–1	6–3	4–5	6–3	—	9–10	7–2	9–10	6–3	12–6
Seattle	15–4	8–1	6–3	7–2	5–2	5–2	6–3	8–1	6–3	10–9	—	7–2	15–5	6–3	12–6
Tampa Bay	2–7	9–10	5–14	2–5	1–5	2–4	2–4	6–1	6–13	2–7	2–7	—	4–5	9–10	10–8
Texas	12–7	7–2	2–5	2–7	4–5	1–8	5–4	5–4	4–3	10–9	5–15	5–4	—	3–6	8–10
Toronto	4–5	12–7	7–12	3–3	4–2	4–2	3–4	5–2	8–11	3–6	3–6	10–9	6–3	—	8–10

=== Notable transactions ===
- June 22, 2001: Steve Karsay and Steve Reed were traded by the Indians to the Atlanta Braves for John Rocker and Troy Cameron (minors).
- July 31, 2001: Zach Day was traded by the Indians to the Montreal Expos for Milton Bradley.

=== Roster ===
2001 Cleveland Indians
**Roster**
**Pitchers**: 51 Mike Bacsik; 55 Danys Báez; 34 Dave Burba; 40 Bartolo Colón; 57 Ryan Drese; 47 Tim Drew; 31 Chuck Finley; 20 Steve Karsay; 41 Charles Nagy; 36 Scott Radinsky; 39 Steve Reed; 73 Ricardo Rincón; 54 David Riske; 49 John Rocker; 44 Rich Rodriguez; 52 CC Sabathia; 53 Paul Shuey; 48 Roy Smith; 45 Justin Speier; 37 Jake Westbrook; 26 Bob Wickman; 29 Steve Woodard; 27 Jaret Wright	**Catchers**: 2 Einar Díaz; 45 Tim Laker; 16 Eddie Taubensee; **Infielders**: 12 Roberto Alomar; 33 Russell Branyan; 17 Travis Fryman; 1 Mark Lewis; 8 John McDonald; 25 Jim Thome; 13 Omar Vizquel	**Outfielders**: 39 Milton Bradley; 23 Ellis Burks; 6 Jolbert Cabrera; 30 Wil Cordero; 46 Marty Cordova; 51 Jacob Cruz; 50 Karim García; 22 Juan González; 7 Kenny Lofton; 10 Dave Roberts; **Other batters**: 20 Dave Hollins	**Manager**: 32 Charlie Manuel; **Coaches**: 4 Luis Isaac (Bullpen); 28 Clarence Jones (Hitting); 9 Grady Little (Bench); 38 Dick Pole (Pitching); 35 Joel Skinner (Third Base); 11 Ted Uhlaender (First Base); 43 Dan Williams (Bullpen Catcher)

=== Game log ===
2001 Game Log: 91–71 (Home: 44–36; Away: 47–35)
April: 14–9 (Home: 9–5; Away: 5–4)

#	Date	Opponent	Score	Win	Loss	Save	Stadium	Attendance	Record	Streak
1	April 2	White Sox	4–7	Wells (1–0)	**Colón** (0–1)	Foulke (1)	**Jacobs Field**	42,606	0–1	L1
2	April 4	White Sox	8–4	**Finley** (1–0)	Eldred (0–1)	—	**Jacobs Field**	32,763	1–1	W1
3	April 6	Orioles	4–3	**Rincón** (1–0)	Mercedes (0–1)	**Wickman** (1)	**Jacobs Field**	32,738	2–1	W2
4	April 7	Orioles	2–4 (11)	Trombley (1–0)	**Reed** (0–1)	Kohlmeier (1)	**Jacobs Field**	40,704	2–2	L1
5	April 8	Orioles	4–3	**Speier** (1–0)	Maduro (0–1)	**Wickman** (2)	**Jacobs Field**	40,754	3–2	W1
6	April 9	@ White Sox	2–9	Biddle (1–0)	**Finley** (1–1)	—	Comiskey Park	21,242	3–3	L1
7	April 10	@ White Sox	7–8	Glover (1–0)	**Shuey** (0–1)	Foulke (2)	Comiskey Park	12,465	3–4	L2
8	April 11	@ White Sox	6–7	Lowe (1–0)	**Burba** (0–1)	Foulke (3)	Comiskey Park	12,693	3–5	L3
9	April 12	@ Tigers	5–3	**Colón** (1–1)	Holt (1–1)	**Wickman** (2)	Comerica Park	15,639	4–5	W1
10	April 13	@ Tigers	9–8	**Sabathia** (1–0)	Weaver (1–2)	**Shuey** (1)	Comerica Park	20,334	5–5	W2
11	April 14	@ Tigers	0–1	Sparks (1–1)	**Finley** (1–2)	—	Comerica Park	23,119	5–6	L1
–	April 15	@ Tigers	Postponed (rain, makeup July 28)							
12	April 17	@ Orioles	8–1	**Burba** (1–1)	Mercedes (0–3)	—	Oriole Park at Camden Yards	28,679	6–6	W1
13	April 18	@ Orioles	4–1	**Colón** (2–1)	Hentgen (0–2)	—	Oriole Park at Camden Yards	28,801	7–6	W2
14	April 19	@ Orioles	11–5	**Sabathia** (2–0)	McElroy (0–1)	—	Oriole Park at Camden Yards	34,100	8–6	W3
15	April 20	Tigers	5–4	**Wickman** (1–0)	Nitkowski (0–1)	—	**Jacobs Field**	33,127	9–6	W4
16	April 21	Tigers	5–4 (11)	**Reed** (1–1)	Jones (0–2)	—	**Jacobs Field**	42,068	10–6	W5
17	April 22	Tigers	11–3	**Burba** (2–1)	Mlicki (0–2)	—	**Jacobs Field**	34,125	11–6	W6
18	April 24	Angels	2–7	Schoeneweis (2–1)	**Colón** (2–2)	—	**Jacobs Field**	31,942	11–7	L1
19	April 25	Angels	1–3	Valdez (1–2)	**Sabathia** (2–1)	Percival (3)	**Jacobs Field**	31,396	11–8	L2
20	April 26	Angels	6–5	**Shuey** (1–1)	Hasegawa (1–2)	**Wickman** (4)	**Jacobs Field**	29,427	12–8	W1
21	April 27	Rangers	9–11	Mahomes (1–2)	**Drew** (0–1)	Zimmerman (2)	**Jacobs Field**	40,320	12–9	L1
22	April 28	Rangers	7–3	**Burba** (3–1)	Helling (1–4)	—	**Jacobs Field**	41,147	13–9	W1
23	April 29	Rangers	9–2	**Colón** (3–2)	Davis (2–2)	—	**Jacobs Field**	40,132	14–9	W2

May: 19–8 (Home: 7–5; Away: 12–3)

#	Date	Opponent	Score	Win	Loss	Save	Stadium	Attendance	Record	Streak
24	May 1	@ Royals	13–2	**Finley** (2–2)	Durbin (0–1)	—	Kauffman Stadium	14,512	15–9	W3
25	May 2	@ Royals	8–4	**Sabathia** (3–1)	Suzuki (2–2)	—	Kauffman Stadium	13,401	16–9	W4
26	May 3	@ Royals	9–4	**Burba** (4–1)	Reichert (3–2)	—	Kauffman Stadium	23,869	17–9	W5
27	May 4	@ Devil Rays	8–6	**Colón** (4–2)	Lopez (3–3)	**Shuey** (2)	Tropicana Field	14,287	18–9	W6
28	May 5	@ Devil Rays	9–4	**Speier** (2–0)	Wilson (1–4)	**Karsay** (1)	Tropicana Field	14,144	19–9	W7
29	May 6	@ Devil Rays	10–3	**Finley** (3–2)	Creek (1–1)	—	Tropicana Field	17,759	20–9	W8
30	May 8	Royals	8–4	**Burba** (5–1)	Cogan (0–2)	—	**Jacobs Field**	31,537	21–9	W9
31	May 9	Royals	5–1	**Sabathia** (4–1)	Reichert (3–3)	—	**Jacobs Field**	32,664	22–9	W10
32	May 10	Royals	3–8	Meadows (1–4)	**Colón** (4–3)	—	**Jacobs Field**	34,502	22–10	L1
33	May 11	Devil Rays	10–6	**Rodriguez** (1–0)	Rekar (0–5)	—	**Jacobs Field**	42,009	23–10	W1
34	May 12	Devil Rays	8–0	**Finley** (4–2)	Rose (0–2)	—	**Jacobs Field**	40,399	24–10	W2
35	May 13	Devil Rays	0–7	Sturtze (1–2)	**Burba** (5–2)	—	**Jacobs Field**	41,399	24–11	L1
36	May 15	@ Rangers	8–6	**Sabathia** (5–1)	Davis (2–4)	**Wickman** (5)	The Ballpark in Arlington	39,348	25–11	W1
37	May 16	@ Rangers	4–3	**Shuey** (2–1)	Crabtree (0–2)	**Wickman** (6)	The Ballpark in Arlington	33,695	26–11	W2
38	May 17	@ Rangers	7–12	Rogers (2–3)	**Finley** (4–3)	—	The Ballpark in Arlington	37,191	26–12	L1
39	May 18	@ Angels	7–2	**Burba** (6–2)	Rapp (1–4)		Edison International Field of Anaheim	39,177	27–12	W1
40	May 19	@ Angels	4–3 (10)	**Shuey** (3–1)	Percival (2–1)	**Wickman** (7)	Edison International Field of Anaheim	40,019	28–12	W2
41	May 20	@ Angels	6–9	Levine (2–2)	**Rodriguez** (1–1)	Percival (10)	Edison International Field of Anaheim	36,339	28–13	L1
42	May 22	Tigers	0–3	Weaver (4–5)	**Colón** (4–4)	Jones (10)	**Jacobs Field**	35,362	28–14	L2
43	May 23	Tigers	4–3 (10)	**Wickman** (2–0)	Borkowski (0–1)	—	**Jacobs Field**	36,804	29–14	W1
44	May 24	Tigers	8–5	**Burba** (7–2)	Santos (1–1)	**Wickman** (8)	**Jacobs Field**	36,295	30–14	W2
45	May 25	Yankees	6–4	**Rodriguez** (2–1)	Hernandez (0–5)	**Wickman** (9)	**Jacobs Field**	42,455	31–14	W3
46	May 26	Yankees	5–12	Clemens (5–1)	**Sabathia** (5–2)	—	**Jacobs Field**	42,528	31–15	L1
47	May 27	Yankees	2–6	Lilly (2–0)	**Colón** (4–5)	Rivera (14)	**Jacobs Field**	42,570	31–16	L2
48	May 28	@ Tigers	6–12	Sparks (3–2)	**Finley** (4–4)	—	Comerica Park	24,615	31–17	L3
49	May 29	@ Tigers	6–4	**Shuey** (4–1)	Murray (0–2)	**Wickman** (10)	Comerica Park	21,404	32–17	W1
50	May 30	@ Tigers	8–4	**Wright** (1–0)	Holt (4–4)	**Wickman** (11)	Comerica Park	18,359	33–17	W2

June: 12–15 (Home: 4–7; Away: 8–8)

#	Date	Opponent	Score	Win	Loss	Save	Stadium	Attendance	Record	Streak
51	June 1	@ Yankees	7–4 (6)	**Sabathia** (6–2)	Lilly (2–1)	**Rincón** (1)	Yankee Stadium	42,032	34–17	W3
52	June 2	@ Yankees	4–9	Clemens (6–1)	**Colón** (4–6)	Rivera (16)	Yankee Stadium	46,618	34–18	L1
53	June 3	@ Yankees	4–3	**Nagy** (1–0)	Pettitte (6–4)	**Wickman** (12)	Yankee Stadium	47,300	35–18	W1
54	June 4	@ Twins	10–11	Guerrero (5–0)	**Shuey** (4–2)	—	Hubert H. Humphrey Metrodome	20,613	35–19	L1
55	June 5	@ Twins	5–0	**Wright** (2–0)	Romero (1–2)	—	Hubert H. Humphrey Metrodome	22,022	36–19	W1
56	June 6	@ Twins	5–2	**Shuey** (5–2)	Cressend (2–1)	**Wickman** (13)	Hubert H. Humphrey Metrodome	24,031	37–19	W2
57	June 7	@ Twins	6–2	**Colón** (5–6)	Radke (7–2)	—	Hubert H. Humphrey Metrodome	24,671	38–19	W3
58	June 8	Reds	4–7	Brower (3–3)	**Rodriguez** (2–2)	Graves (14)	**Jacobs Field**	42,512	38–20	L1
59	June 9	Reds	10–2	**Burba** (8–2)	Fernandez (5–6)	—	**Jacobs Field**	42,521	39–20	W1
60	June 10	Reds	3–9	Reitsma (3–5)	**Wright** (2–1)	—	**Jacobs Field**	49,479	39–21	L1
61	June 12	Brewers	2–4	Fox (2–0)	**Shuey** (5–3)	Leskanic (7)	**Jacobs Field**	39,192	39–22	L2
62	June 13	Brewers	5–2 (10)	**Wickman** (3–0)	Fox (2–1)	—	**Jacobs Field**	35,679	40–22	L1
63	June 14	Brewers	4–9	Sheets (7–4)	**Nagy** (1–1)	—	**Jacobs Field**	41,610	40–23	L1
64	June 15	@ Pirates	3–6	Anderson (4–6)	**Burba** (8–3)	Williams (12)	PNC Park	36,235	40–24	L2
65	June 16	@ Pirates	4–6	Schmidt (3–2)	**Wright** (2–2)	Williams (13)	PNC Park	37,056	40–25	L3
66	June 17	@ Pirates	0–1	Ritchie (2–0)	**Karsay** (0–1)	—	PNC Park	36,694	40–26	L4
67	June 19	Twins	9–10 (12)	Wells (5–2)	**Nagy** (1–2)	—	**Jacobs Field**	39,190	40–27	L5
68	June 20	Twins	4–2	**Westbrook** (1–0)	Mays (8–5)	**Wickman** (14)	**Jacobs Field**	40,213	41–27	W1
69	June 21	Twins	9–6 (7)	**Woodard** (1–0)	Romero (1–4)	**Rincón** (2)	**Jacobs Field**	39,755	42–27	W2
70	June 22	@ Royals	6–5	**Sabathia** (7–2)	Stein (3–6)	**Wickman** (15)	Kauffman Stadium	31,572	43–27	W3
71	June 23	@ Royals	2–3	Durbin (5–6)	**Burba** (8–4)	R. Hernandez (13)	Kauffman Stadium	29,808	43–28	L1
72	June 24	@ Royals	4–2	**Colón** (6–6)	Suppan (3–7)	**Rocker** (20)	Kauffman Stadium	25,127	44–28	W1
73	June 25	@ Yankees	7–8	Witasick (6–2)	**Rincón** (1–1)	Rivera (24)	Yankee Stadium	40,852	44–29	L1
74	June 26	@ Yankees	5–3	**Nagy** (2–2)	A. Hernandez (0–2)	**Rocker** (21)	Yankee Stadium	40,346	45–29	W1
75	June 27	@ Yankees	5–15	Mussina (8–7)	**Sabathia** (7–3)	—	Yankee Stadium	45,539	45–30	L1
76	June 29	Royals	3–5	Suppan (4–7)	**Burba** (8–5)	R. Hernandez (14)	**Jacobs Field**	42,500	45–31	L2
77	June 30	Royals	7–11	Wilson (2–0)	**Colón** (6–7)	—	**Jacobs Field**	42,446	45–32	L3

July: 15–13 (Home: 8–8; Away: 7–5)

#	Date	Opponent	Score	Win	Loss	Save	Stadium	Attendance	Record	Streak
78	July 1	Royals	11–13	Stein (4–6)	**Nagy** (2–3)	R. Hernandez (15)	**Jacobs Field**	42,457	45–33	L4
79	July 2	Royals	2–1	**Rocker** (3–2)	Cogan (0–3)	—	**Jacobs Field**	40,248	46–33	W1
80	July 3	Red Sox	9–1	**Westbrook** (2–0)	Ohka (2–3)	—	**Jacobs Field**	42,520	47–33	W2
81	July 4	Red Sox	4–13	Wakefield (6–2)	**Burba** (8–6)	—	**Jacobs Field**	42,382	47–34	L1
82	July 5	Red Sox	4–5	Lowe (4–6)	**Rocker** (3–3)	—	**Jacobs Field**	42,647	47–35	L2
83	July 6	Cardinals	14–2	**Nagy** (3–3)	Morris (10–5)	—	**Jacobs Field**	42,394	48–35	W1
84	July 7	Cardinals	7–6 (10)	**Rocker** (4–3)	Veres (0–1)	—	**Jacobs Field**	42,467	49–35	W2
85	July 8	Cardinals	3–4	Timlin (3–4)	**Rocker** (4–4)	—	**Jacobs Field**	42,431	49–36	L1
–	July 10	72nd All-Star Game	National League vs. American League (Safeco Field, Seattle, Washington)							
86	July 12	@ Reds	7–0	**Colón** (7–7)	Reitsma (4–8)	—	Cinergy Field	28,816	50–36	W1
87	July 13	@ Reds	5–1	**Sabathia** (8–3)	Dessens (6–7)	—	Cinergy Field	38,790	51–36	W2
88	July 14	@ Reds	5–6 (13)	Graves (3–2)	**Rocker** (4–5)	—	Cinergy Field	40,794	51–37	L1
89	July 15	@ Astros	3–5	Redding (2–0)	**Westbrook** (2–1)	Wagner (20)	Enron Field	39,127	51–38	L2
90	July 16	@ Astros	8–10	Villone (3–3)	**Rocker** (4–6)	—	Enron Field	30,834	51–39	L3
91	July 17	@ Astros	10–4	**Colón** (8–7)	Reynolds (8–9)	—	Enron Field	32,284	52–39	W1
92	July 18	@ White Sox	9–4	**Sabathia** (9–3)	Buehrle (7–5)	—	Comiskey Park	22,634	53–39	W2
93	July 19	@ White Sox	10–3	**Burba** (9–6)	Lowe (5–2)	—	Comiskey Park	23,450	54–39	W3
94	July 20	Tigers	3–7	Holt (7–7)	**Westbrook** (2–2)	—	**Jacobs Field**	42,520	54–40	L1
95	July 21	Tigers	8–4	**Nagy** (4–3)	Pettyjohn (0–2)	—	**Jacobs Field**	42,316	55–40	W1
96	July 22	Tigers	6–3	**Colón** (9–7)	Weaver (9–9)	—	**Jacobs Field**	42,462	56–40	W2
97	July 23	White Sox	2–0	**Sabathia** (10–3)	Buehrle (7–6)	**Wickman** (16)	**Jacobs Field**	41,317	57–40	W3
98	July 24	White Sox	1–4	Lowe (6–2)	**Burba** (9–7)	Foulke (22)	**Jacobs Field**	42,175	57–41	L1
99	July 25	White Sox	7–5	**Westbrook** (3–2)	Biddle (2–7)	**Wickman** (17)	**Jacobs Field**	42,645	58–41	W1
100	July 26	White Sox	4–5	Ginter (1–0)	**Nagy** (4–4)	Foulke (23)	**Jacobs Field**	42,054	58–42	L1
101	July 27	@ Tigers	7–4	**Colón** (10–7)	Pettyjohn (0–3)	**Wickman** (18)	Comerica Park	39,504	59–42	W1
102	July 28 (1)	@ Tigers	6–4	**Báez** (1–0)	Murray (0–4)	**Wickman** (19)	Comerica Park	27,643	60–42	W2
103	July 28 (2)	@ Tigers	2–4	Weaver (10–9)	**Woodard** (1–1)	Anderson (12)	Comerica Park	34,916	60–43	L1
104	July 29	@ Tigers	3–8	Sparks (8–5)	**Burba** (9–8)	—	Comerica Park	32,918	60–44	L2
105	July 31	Athletics	2–11	Lidle (5–5)	**Westbrook** (3–3)	—	**Jacobs Field**	38,830	60–45	L3

August: 16–13 (Home: 9–6; Away: 7–7)

#	Date	Opponent	Score	Win	Loss	Save	Stadium	Attendance	Record	Streak
106	August 1	Athletics	6–5	**Báez** (2–0)	Mecir (2–8)	**Wickman** (20)	**Jacobs Field**	40,592	61–45	W1
107	August 2	Athletics	4–17	Mulder (13–6)	**Sabathia** (10–4)	—	**Jacobs Field**	38,226	61–46	L1
108	August 3	Mariners	1–2	Moyer (12–5)	**Colón** (10–8)	Sasaki (35)	**Jacobs Field**	42,580	61–47	L2
109	August 4	Mariners	5–8	Garcia (13–3)	**Báez** (2–1)	Rhodes (3)	**Jacobs Field**	42,440	61–48	L3
110	August 5	Mariners	15–14 (11)	**Rocker** (5–6)	Paniagua (3–3)	—	**Jacobs Field**	42,494	62–48	W1
111	August 6	Mariners	6–8	Abbott (12–2)	**Nagy** (4–5)	Paniagua (3)	**Jacobs Field**	42,058	62–49	L1
112	August 7	@ Twins	7–2	**Sabathia** (11–4)	Reed (9–7)	—	Hubert H. Humphrey Metrodome	28,192	63–49	W1
113	August 8	@ Twins	8–2 (10)	**Báez** (3–1)	Wells (8–4)	—	Hubert H. Humphrey Metrodome	38,444	64–49	W2
114	August 9	@ Twins	4–6	Milton (11–4)	**Finley** (4–5)	Hawkins (27)	Hubert H. Humphrey Metrodome	30,080	64–50	L1
115	August 10	@ Rangers	2–7	Davis (6–8)	**Woodard** (1–2)	—	The Ballpark in Arlington	47,242	64–51	L2
116	August 11	@ Rangers	5–6	Petkovsek (1–1)	**Rocker** (5–7)	Zimmerman (22)	The Ballpark in Arlington	43,145	64–52	L3
117	August 12	@ Rangers	13–2	**Sabathia** (12–4)	Bell (4–7)	—	The Ballpark in Arlington	28,765	65–52	W1
118	August 14	Twins	8–7 (11)	**Báez** (4–1)	Wells (8–5)	—	**Jacobs Field**	42,619	66–52	W2
119	August 15	Twins	8–2	**Finley** (5–5)	Mays (12–11)	—	**Jacobs Field**	41,602	67–52	W3
120	August 16	Twins	6–1	**Woodard** (2–2)	Johnson (1–2)	—	**Jacobs Field**	40,672	68–52	W4
121	August 17	Angels	2–7	Ortiz (11–7)	**Nagy** (4–6)	—	**Jacobs Field**	42,528	68–53	L1
122	August 18	Angels	4–2	**Sabathia** (13–4)	Rapp (5–10)	**Wickman** (21)	**Jacobs Field**	42,610	69–53	W1
123	August 19	Angels	1–4	Washburn (11–6)	**Colón** (10–9)	Percival (35)	**Jacobs Field**	42,510	69–54	L1
124	August 20	@ Athletics	0–9	Zito (9–8)	**Finley** (5–6)	—	Network Associates Coliseum	18,133	69–55	L2
125	August 21	@ Athletics	2–1	**Woodard** (3–2)	Lidle (8–6)	**Wickman** (22)	Network Associates Coliseum	19,343	70–55	W1
126	August 22	@ Athletics	5–4 (11)	**Wickman** (4–0)	Vizcaino (1–1)	**Riske** (1)	Network Associates Coliseum	40,992	71–55	W2
127	August 23	@ Athletics	9–7	**Nagy** (5–6)	Mulder (15–7)	**Wickman** (23)	Network Associates Coliseum	22,281	72–55	W3
128	August 24	@ Mariners	1–4	Moyer (15–5)	**Colón** (10–10)	Charlton (1)	Safeco Field	45,767	72–56	L1
129	August 25	@ Mariners	2–3 (11)	Halama (9–6)	**Rocker** (5–8)	—	Safeco Field	45,818	72–57	L2
130	August 26	@ Mariners	4–3	**Riske** (1–0)	Nelson (4–2)	**Wickman** (24)	Safeco Field	45,782	73–57	W1
131	August 28	Red Sox	8–3	**Burba** (10–8)	Cone (8–3)	—	**Jacobs Field**	41,048	74–57	W2
132	August 29	Red Sox	2–1	**Sabathia** (14–4)	Fossum (1–1)	**Wickman** (25)	**Jacobs Field**	41,320	75–57	W3
133	August 30	Red Sox	3–1	**Colón** (11–10)	Nomo (11–6)	**Wickman** (26)	**Jacobs Field**	40,616	76–57	W4
134	August 31	@ White Sox	8–11	Howry (4–5)	**Westbrook** (3–4)	Foulke (36)	Comiskey Park	24,097	76–58	L1

September: 13–8 (Home: 7–5; Away: 6–3)

#	Date	Opponent	Score	Win	Loss	Save	Stadium	Attendance	Record	Streak
135	September 1	@ White Sox	4–3	**Drese** (1–0)	Garland (6–5)	**Wickman** (27)	Comiskey Park	27,869	77–58	W1
136	September 2	@ White Sox	10–19	Biddle (6–8)	**Burba** (10–9)	—	Comiskey Park	25,680	77–59	L1
137	September 3	@ White Sox	6–3	**Sabathia** (15–4)	Glover (4–2)	**Wickman** (28)	Comiskey Park	28,135	78–59	W1
138	September 4	@ Red Sox	8–5	**Colón** (12–10)	Nomo (11–7)	**Wickman** (29)	Fenway Park	32,145	79–59	W2
139	September 5	@ Red Sox	7–10	Arrojo (4–3)	**Woodard** (3–3)	Urbina (20)	Fenway Park	32,029	79–60	L1
140	September 6	@ Red Sox	6–4	**Finley** (6–6)	Castillo (8–8)	**Rocker** (22)	Fenway Park	32,500	80–60	W1
141	September 7	White Sox	7–10	Biddle (7–8)	**Burba** (10–10)	Foulke (38)	**Jacobs Field**	42,487	80–61	L1
142	September 8	White Sox	8–7	**Báez** (5–1)	Foulke (3–8)	—	**Jacobs Field**	42,488	81–61	W1
143	September 9	White Sox	9–8	**Wickman** (5–0)	Foulke (3–9)	—	**Jacobs Field**	42,377	82–61	W2
144	September 10	White Sox	1–7	Wright (4–2)	**Colón** (12–11)	—	**Jacobs Field**	38,244	82–62	L1
–	September 11	@ Royals	Postponed (9/11 attacks, makeup October 2)							
–	September 12	@ Royals	Postponed (9/11 attacks, makeup October 3)							
–	September 13	@ Royals	Postponed (9/11 attacks, makeup October 4)							
–	September 14	@ Blue Jays	Postponed (9/11 attacks, makeup October 5)							
–	September 15	@ Blue Jays	Postponed (9/11 attacks, makeup October 6)							
–	September 16	@ Blue Jays	Postponed (9/11 attacks, makeup October 7)							
145	September 18	Royals	11–2	**Finley** (7–6)	Durbin (7–15)	—	**Jacobs Field**	34,795	83–62	W1
146	September 19	Royals	11–3	**Colón** (13–11)	Suppan (9–12)	—	**Jacobs Field**	31,357	84–62	W2
147	September 20	Royals	2–4	George (4–5)	**Drese** (1–1)	Hernandez (24)	**Jacobs Field**	33,912	84–63	L1
148	September 21	@ Twins	2–6	Reed (12–9)	**Sabathia** (15–5)	Guerrero (7)	Hubert H. Humphrey Metrodome	20,038	84–64	L2
149	September 22	@ Twins	4–2	**Rincón** (2–1)	Radke (13–10)	**Wickman** (30)	Hubert H. Humphrey Metrodome	33,733	85–64	W1
150	September 23	@ Twins	4–2	**Finley** (8–6)	Milton (14–7)	**Wickman** (31)	Hubert H. Humphrey Metrodome	21,928	86–64	W2
151	September 24	Blue Jays	2–3 (11)	File (4–3)	**Báez** (5–2)	Eyre (1)	**Jacobs Field**	32,425	86–65	L1
152	September 25	Blue Jays	11–7	**Riske** (2–0)	Plesac (4–5)	—	**Jacobs Field**	35,729	87–65	W1
–	September 26	Blue Jays	Postponed (rain, makeup October 5 in Toronto)							
153	September 28	Twins	0–1	Milton (15–7)	**Báez** (5–3)	Guerrero (9)	**Jacobs Field**	41,319	87–66	L1
154	September 29	Twins	9–8	**Westbrook** (4–4)	Guerrero (7–1)	—	**Jacobs Field**	42,417	88–66	W1
155	September 30	Twins	9–1	**Colón** (14–11)	Reed (12–11)	—	**Jacobs Field**	42,323	89–66	W2

October: 2–5 (Home: 0–0; Away: 2–5)

#	Date	Opponent	Score	Win	Loss	Save	Stadium	Attendance	Record	Streak
156	October 2	@ Royals	1–5	Hernandez (5–6)	**Rocker** (5–9)	—	Kauffman Stadium	12,016	89–67	L1
157	October 3	@ Royals	4–1	**Sabathia** (16–5)	MacDougal (1–1)	**Wickman** (32)	Kauffman Stadium	12,581	90–67	W1
158	October 4	@ Royals	4–8	Durbin (9–16)	**Colón** (14–12)	—	Kauffman Stadium	12,672	90–68	L1
159	October 5 (1)	@ Blue Jays	0–5	Halladay (5–3)	**Finley** (8–7)	—	SkyDome	N/A	90–69	L2
160	October 5 (2)	@ Blue Jays	3–4 (11)	File (5–3)	**Drese** (1–2)	—	SkyDome	19,387	90–70	L3
161	October 6	@ Blue Jays	2–5	Carpenter (11–11)	**Drew** (0–2)	Quantrill (2)	SkyDome	20,762	90–71	L4
162	October 7	@ Blue Jays	3–2	**Sabathia** (17–5)	Lyon (5–4)	**Rocker** (23)	SkyDome	28,217	91–71	W1

Legend: = Win = Loss = Postponement
Bold = Indians team member

== Player stats ==
=== Batting ===
==== Starters by position ====
Note: Pos = Position; G = Games played; AB = At bats; R = Runs scored; H = Hits; 2B = Doubles; 3B = Triples; HR = Home runs; RBI = Runs batted in; AVG = Batting average; SB = Stolen bases

Pos	Player	G	AB	R	H	2B	3B	HR	RBI	AVG	SB
C	Einar Díaz	134	437	54	121	34	1	4	56	.277	1
1B	Jim Thome	156	526	101	153	26	1	49	124	.291	0
2B	Roberto Alomar	157	575	113	193	34	12	20	100	.336	30
3B	Travis Fryman	98	334	34	88	15	0	3	38	.263	1
SS	Omar Vizquel	155	611	84	156	26	8	2	50	.255	13
LF	Marty Cordova	122	409	61	123	20	2	20	69	.301	0
CF	Kenny Lofton	133	517	91	135	21	4	14	66	.261	16
RF	Juan González	140	532	97	173	34	1	35	140	.325	1
DH	Ellis Burks	124	439	83	123	29	1	28	74	.280	5

==== Other batters ====
Note: G = Games played; AB = At bats; R = Runs scored; H = Hits; 2B = Doubles; 3B = Triples; HR = Home runs; RBI = Runs batted in; AVG = Batting average; SB = Stolen bases

Player	G	AB	R	H	2B	3B	HR	RBI	AVG	SB
Milton Bradley	10	18	3	4	1	0	0	0	.222	1
Russell Branyan	113	315	48	73	16	2	20	54	.232	1
Jolbert Cabrera	141	287	50	75	16	3	1	38	.261	10
Wil Cordero	89	268	30	67	11	1	4	21	.250	0
Jacob Cruz	28	68	12	15	4	0	3	11	.221	0
Karim García	20	45	8	14	3	0	5	9	.311	0
Dave Hollins	2	5	0	1	0	0	0	0	.200	0
Tim Laker	16	33	5	6	0	0	1	5	.182	0
Mark Lewis	6	13	1	1	0	0	0	0	.077	0
John McDonald	17	22	1	2	1	0	0	0	.091	0
Dave Roberts	15	12	3	4	1	0	0	2	.333	0
Eddie Taubensee	52	116	16	29	2	1	3	11	.250	0

Note: Pitchers' batting statistics are not included above.

=== Pitching ===
==== Starting pitchers ====
Note: W = Wins; L = Losses; ERA = Earned run average; G = Games pitched; GS = Games started; IP = Innings pitched; H = Hits allowed; R = Runs allowed; ER = Earned runs allowed; BB = Walks allowed; K = Strikeouts

Player	W	L	ERA	G	GS	IP	H	R	ER	BB	K
Bartolo Colón	13	13	4.09	34	34	222.1	220	106	101	90	201
CC Sabathia	17	5	4.39	33	33	180.1	149	93	88	95	171
Dave Burba	10	10	6.21	32	27	150.2	188	112	104	54	118
Chuck Finley	8	7	5.54	22	22	113.2	131	78	70	35	96
Charles Nagy	5	6	6.40	15	13	70.1	102	53	50	20	29
Jaret Wright	2	2	6.52	7	7	29.0	36	22	21	22	18
Tim Drew	0	2	7.97	8	6	35.0	51	39	31	16	15

==== Other pitchers ====
Note: W = Wins; L = Losses; ERA = Earned run average; G = Games pitched; GS = Games started; SV = Saves; IP = Innings pitched; H = Hits allowed; R = Runs allowed; ER = Earned runs allowed; BB = Walks allowed; K = Strikeouts

Player	W	L	ERA	G	GS	SV	IP	H	R	ER	BB	K
Steve Woodard	3	3	5.20	29	10	0	97.0	129	60	56	17	52
Jake Westbrook	4	4	5.85	23	6	0	64.2	79	43	42	22	48
Ryan Drese	1	2	3.44	9	4	0	36.2	32	15	14	15	24

==== Relief pitchers ====
Note: W = Wins; L = Losses; ERA = Earned run average; G = Games pitched; SV = Saves; IP = Innings pitched; H = Hits allowed; R = Runs allowed; ER = Earned runs; BB = Walks allowed; K = Strikeouts

Player	W	L	ERA	G	SV	IP	H	R	ER	BB	K
Bob Wickman	5	0	2.39	70	32	67.2	61	18	18	14	66
Ricardo Rincón	2	1	2.83	67	2	54.0	44	18	17	21	50
Rich Rodriguez	2	2	4.15	53	0	39.0	41	24	18	17	31
Paul Shuey	5	3	2.82	47	2	54.1	53	25	17	26	70
Danys Báez	5	3	2.50	43	0	50.1	34	22	14	20	52
Steve Karsay	0	1	1.25	31	1	43.1	29	6	6	8	44
John Rocker	3	7	5.45	38	4	34.2	33	23	21	25	43
David Riske	2	0	1.98	26	1	27.1	20	7	6	18	29
Steve Reed	1	1	3.62	31	0	27.1	22	11	11	10	21
Justin Speier	2	0	6.97	12	0	20.2	24	16	16	8	15
Roy Smith	0	0	6.06	9	0	16.1	16	14	11	13	17
Mike Bacsik	0	0	9.00	3	0	9.0	13	10	9	3	4
Scott Radinsky	0	0	27.00	2	0	2.0	4	6	6	3	3
Tim Laker	0	0	0.00	1	0	1.0	1	0	0	1	1

== Postseason ==
=== Game log ===
2001 Postseason Game Log
American League Division Series

#	Date	Opponent	Score	Win	Loss	Save	Stadium	Attendance	Record
1	October 9	@ Mariners	5–0	**Colón** (1–0)	Garcia (0–1)	—	Safeco Field	48,033	1–0
2	October 11	@ Mariners	1–5	Moyer (1–0)	**Finley** (0–1)	—	Safeco Field	48,052	1–1
3	October 13	Mariners	17–2	**Sabathia** (1–0)	Sele (0–1)	—	**Jacobs Field**	45,069	2–1
4	October 14	Mariners	2–6	Garcia (1–1)	**Colón** (1–1)	—	**Jacobs Field**	45,025	2–2
5	October 15	@ Mariners	1–3	Moyer (2–0)	**Finley** (0–2)	Sasaki (1)	Safeco Field	47,867	2–3

Legend: = Win = Loss = Postponement
Bold = Indians team member

=== Postseason rosters ===
Playoff rosters
American League Division Series

- Pitchers: 55 Danys Báez 34 Dave Burba 40 Bartolo Colón 31 Chuck Finley 73 Ricardo Rincón 54 David Riske 49 John Rocker 52 CC Sabathia 53 Paul Shuey 26 Bob Wickman
- Catchers: 2 Einar Díaz
- Infielders: 12 Roberto Alomar 33 Russell Branyan 17 Travis Fryman 25 Jim Thome 13 Omar Vizquel
- Outfielders: 6 Jolbert Cabrera 30 Wil Cordero 46 Marty Cordova 22 Juan González 7 Kenny Lofton
- Designated hitter: 23 Ellis Burks

== Award winners ==
All-Star Game

- Juan Gonzalez, right field, starter
- Roberto Alomar, second base, reserve

== Minor league affiliates ==
Classification level	Team	League
AAA	Buffalo Bisons	International League
AA	Akron Aeros	Eastern League
Advanced A	Kinston Indians	Carolina League
A	Columbus RedStixx	South Atlantic League
Short Season A	Mahoning Valley Scrappers	New York–Penn League
Rookie	Burlington Indians	Appalachian League
