= 2001 Kansas City Royals season =

2001 Kansas City Royals
- League: American League
- Division: Central
- Ballpark: Kauffman Stadium
- City: Kansas City, Missouri
- Record: 65–97 (.401)
- Divisional place: 5th
- Owners: David Glass
- General managers: Allard Baird
- Managers: Tony Muser
- Television: KMBC-TV; KCWE; FSN Rocky Mountain (Paul Splittorff, Bob Davis)
- Radio: KMBZ (Denny Matthews, Ryan Lefebvre)

The 2001 Kansas City Royals season was the 33rd season for the franchise, and their 29th at Kauffman Stadium. The Royals failed to improve on their 77–85 record from 2000 and finished fifth in the American League Central with a record of 65 wins and 97 losses. The Royals missed the postseason for the 16th consecutive season.

== Offseason ==
- January 8, 2001: Johnny Damon was traded as part of a 3-team trade by the Kansas City Royals with Mark Ellis to the Oakland Athletics. The Oakland Athletics sent Ben Grieve to the Tampa Bay Devil Rays. The Oakland Athletics sent Ángel Berroa and A. J. Hinch to the Kansas City Royals. The Tampa Bay Devil Rays sent Cory Lidle to the Oakland Athletics. The Tampa Bay Devil Rays sent Roberto Hernandez to the Kansas City Royals.
- March 23, 2001: Trenidad Hubbard was signed as a free agent with the Kansas City Royals.

== Regular season ==
=== Season standings ===
AL Central
Team	W	L	Pct.	GB	Home	Road
Cleveland Indians	91	71	.562	—	44‍–‍36	47‍–‍35
Minnesota Twins	85	77	.525	6	47‍–‍34	38‍–‍43
Chicago White Sox	83	79	.512	8	46‍–‍35	37‍–‍44
Detroit Tigers	66	96	.407	25	37‍–‍44	29‍–‍52
Kansas City Royals	65	97	.401	26	35‍–‍46	30‍–‍51

=== Record vs. opponents ===
2001 American League record Source: MLB Standings Grid – 2001
Team	ANA	BAL	BOS	CWS	CLE	DET	KC	MIN	NYY	OAK	SEA	TB	TEX	TOR	NL
Anaheim	—	4–5	4–3	6–3	5–4	5–4	5–4	3–6	4–3	6–14	4–15	7–2	7–12	5–4	10–8
Baltimore	5–4	—	9–10	3–4	1–5	4–2	5–2	3–3	5–13–1	2–7	1–8	10–9	2–7	7–12	6–12
Boston	3–4	10–9	—	3–3	3–6	4–5	3–3	3–3	5–13	4–5	3–6	14–5	5–2	12–7	10–8
Chicago	3–6	4–3	3–3	—	10–9	13–6	14–5	5–14	1–5	1–8	2–7	5–2	7–2	3–3	12–6
Cleveland	4–5	5–1	6–3	9–10	—	13–6	11–8	14–5	4–5	4–3	2–5	5–1	5–4	2–4	7–11
Detroit	4–5	2–4	5–4	6–13	6–13	—	8–11	4–15	4–5	1–6	2–5	4–2	8–1	2–4	10–8
Kansas City	4–5	2–5	3–3	5–14	8–11	11–8	—	6–13	0–6	3–6	3–6	4–2	4–5	4–3	8–10
Minnesota	6–3	3–3	3–3	14–5	5–14	15–4	13–6	—	4–2	5–4	1–8	1–6	4–5	2–5	9–9
New York	3–4	13–5–1	13–5	5–1	5–4	5–4	6–0	2–4	—	3–6	3–6	13–6	3–4	11–8	10–8
Oakland	14–6	7–2	5–4	8–1	3–4	6–1	6–3	4–5	6–3	—	9–10	7–2	9–10	6–3	12–6
Seattle	15–4	8–1	6–3	7–2	5–2	5–2	6–3	8–1	6–3	10–9	—	7–2	15–5	6–3	12–6
Tampa Bay	2–7	9–10	5–14	2–5	1–5	2–4	2–4	6–1	6–13	2–7	2–7	—	4–5	9–10	10–8
Texas	12–7	7–2	2–5	2–7	4–5	1–8	5–4	5–4	4–3	10–9	5–15	5–4	—	3–6	8–10
Toronto	4–5	12–7	7–12	3–3	4–2	4–2	3–4	5–2	8–11	3–6	3–6	10–9	6–3	—	8–10

=== Notable transactions ===
- May 23, 2001: Trenidad Hubbard was released by the Kansas City Royals.
- June 5, 2001: Paul Byrd was traded by the Philadelphia Phillies to the Kansas City Royals for José Santiago.
- June 24, 2001: Brent Mayne was traded by the Colorado Rockies to the Kansas City Royals for Sal Fasano and Mac Suzuki.
- July 31, 2001: Rey Sánchez was traded by the Kansas City Royals to the Atlanta Braves for Brad Voyles (minors) and Alejandro Machado (minors).

=== Roster ===
2001 Kansas City Royals
Roster
Pitchers: 26 Jeff Austin; 58 Cory Bailey; 36 Paul Byrd; 55 Tony Cogan; 33 Chad Durbin; 53 Chris George; 38 Jason Grimsley; 19 Doug Henry; 39 Roberto Hernández; 54 Mike MacDougal; 31 Brian Meadows; 57 Scott Mullen; 41 Dan Reichert; 46 José Santiago; 34 Blake Stein; 37 Jeff Suppan; 17 Mac Suzuki; 46 Brad Voyles; 51 Kris Wilson	Catchers: 26 Sal Fasano; 7 A. J. Hinch; 2 Brent Mayne; 22 Héctor Ortiz; 44 Gregg Zaun; Infielders: 12 Luis Alicea; 4 Ángel Berroa; 4 Wilson Delgado; 3 Carlos Febles; 28 Ken Harvey; 6 David McCarty; 8 Luis Ordaz; 17 Neifi Pérez; 16 Joe Randa; 1 Rey Sánchez; 29 Mike Sweeney	Outfielders: 15 Carlos Beltrán; 30 Brandon Berger; 27 Dee Brown; 43 Endy Chávez; 24 Jermaine Dye; 28 Trenidad Hubbard; 18 Raúl Ibañez; 14 Mark Quinn; 1 Donnie Sadler	Manager: 40 Tony Muser; Coaches: 25 Rich Dauer (third base); 21 Tom Gamboa; 23 Lamar Johnson; 9 Jamie Quirk (bench); 30 Brent Strom; 20 Frank White

== Player stats ==
=== Batting ===
==== Starters by position ====
Note: Pos = Position; G = Games played; AB = At bats; H = Hits; Avg. = Batting average; HR = Home runs; RBI = Runs batted in

Pos	Player	G	AB	H	Avg.	HR	RBI
C	Brent Mayne	51	166	40	.241	2	20
1B	Mike Sweeney	147	559	170	.304	29	99
2B	Carlos Febles	79	292	69	.236	8	25
SS	Rey Sánchez	100	390	118	.303	0	28
3B	Joe Randa	151	581	147	.253	13	83
LF	Dee Brown	106	380	93	.245	7	40
CF	Carlos Beltrán	155	617	189	.306	24	101
RF	Jermaine Dye	97	367	100	.272	13	47
DH	Raúl Ibañez	104	279	78	.280	13	54

==== Other batters ====
Note: G = Games played; AB = At bats; H = Hits; Avg. = Batting average; HR = Home runs; RBI = Runs batted in

Player	G	AB	H	Avg.	HR	RBI
Mark Quinn	118	453	122	.269	17	60
Luis Alicea	113	387	106	.274	4	32
Dave McCarty	98	200	50	.250	7	26
Neifi Pérez	49	199	48	.241	1	12
Héctor Ortiz	56	154	38	.247	0	11
Gregg Zaun	39	125	40	.320	6	18
A. J. Hinch	45	121	19	.157	6	15
Donnie Sadler	54	101	13	.129	0	2
Endy Chávez	29	77	16	.208	0	5
Luis Ordaz	28	56	14	.250	0	4
Ángel Berroa	15	53	16	.302	0	4
Wilson Delgado	14	25	3	.120	0	1
Brandon Berger	6	16	5	.313	2	2
Ken Harvey	4	12	3	.250	0	2
Trent Hubbard	5	12	3	.250	0	0
Sal Fasano	3	1	0	.000	0	0

=== Pitching ===
==== Starting pitchers ====
Note: G = Games pitched; IP = Innings pitched; W = Wins; L = Losses; ERA = Earned run average; SO = Strikeouts

Player	G	IP	W	L	ERA	SO
Jeff Suppan	34	218.1	10	14	4.37	120
Chad Durbin	29	179.0	9	16	4.93	95
Dan Reichert	27	123.0	8	8	5.63	77
Paul Byrd	16	93.1	6	6	4.05	49
Chris George	13	74.0	4	8	5.59	32
Brian Meadows	10	50.1	1	6	6.97	21
Mike MacDougal	3	15.1	1	1	4.70	7

==== Other pitchers ====
Note: G = Games pitched; IP = Innings pitched; W = Wins; L = Losses; ERA = Earned run average; SO = Strikeouts

Player	G	IP	W	L	ERA	SO
Blake Stein	36	131.0	7	8	4.74	113
Kris Wilson	29	109.1	6	5	5.19	67
Mac Suzuki	15	56.0	2	5	5.30	37

==== Relief pitchers ====
Note: G = Games pitched; W = Wins; L = Losses; SV = Saves; ERA = Earned run average; SO = Strikeouts

Player	G	W	L	SV	ERA	SO
Roberto Hernández	63	5	6	28	4.12	46
Jason Grimsley	73	1	5	0	3.02	61
Doug Henry	53	2	2	0	6.07	57
Cory Bailey	53	1	1	0	3.48	61
Tony Cogan	39	0	4	0	5.84	17
Jeff Austin	21	0	0	0	5.54	27
José Santiago	20	2	2	0	6.75	15
Scott Mullen	17	0	0	0	4.50	3
Brad Voyles	7	0	0	0	3.86	6

== Farm system ==
Level	Team	League	Manager
AAA	Omaha Golden Spikes	Pacific Coast League	John Mizerock
AA	Wichita Wranglers	Texas League	Keith Bodie
A	Wilmington Blue Rocks	Carolina League	Jeff Garber
A	Burlington Bees	Midwest League	Joe Szekely
A-Short Season	Spokane Indians	Northwest League	Tom Poquette
Rookie	GCL Royals	Gulf Coast League	Lino Diaz
