= 2001 Texas Rangers season =

2001 Texas Rangers
- League: American League
- Division: West
- Ballpark: The Ballpark in Arlington
- City: Arlington, Texas
- Record: 73–89 (.451)
- Divisional place: 4th
- Owners: Tom Hicks
- General managers: Doug Melvin
- Managers: Johnny Oates, Jerry Narron
- Television: KDFW; KDFI (Tom Grieve, Bill Jones)
- Radio: KRLD (Eric Nadel, Vince Cotroneo); KESS-FM (Eleno Ornelas, Edgar Lopez)

The 2001 Texas Rangers season was the 41st of the Texas Rangers franchise overall, their 30th in Arlington as the Rangers, and their 8th season at The Ballpark in Arlington. The Rangers finished fourth in the American League West with a record of 73 wins and 89 losses. Despite the team's batting leading the league in home runs and finishing second in on-base percentage and OPS, the team's pitching was historically poor; the team combined for an ERA of 5.71 (a franchise-worst mark), and led the league in hits allowed, earned runs surrendered, and total runs surrendered. Their 913 earned runs allowed would also be a franchise-worst, and out of all pitchers that recorded at least 75 innings, none had an ERA below 4.45.

== Offseason ==
- November 17, 2000: Aaron Harang was traded by the Texas Rangers with Ryan Cullen (minors) to the Oakland Athletics for Randy Velarde.
- December 10, 2000: Ken Caminiti was signed as a free agent with the Texas Rangers.
- January 26, 2001 – Alex Rodriguez signed with the Texas Rangers, who had fallen to last in their division in 2000. The contract he signed was the most lucrative contract in sports history: a 10-year deal worth $252 million. The deal was worth $63 million more than the second-richest baseball deal at the time.

== Regular season ==
=== Opening Day starters ===
- Iván Rodríguez, C
- Rafael Palmeiro, 1B
- Randy Velarde, 2B
- Ken Caminiti, 3B
- Alex Rodriguez, SS
- Rusty Greer, LF
- Bo Porter, CF
- Rubén Mateo, RF
- Andrés Galarraga, DH
- Rick Helling, RHP

=== Season summary ===
- June 8, 2001 – The first interleague game between the Houston Astros and the Texas Rangers took place at The Ballpark at Arlington. The rivalry would be known as the Lone Star Series. The Astros won the game by a score of 5-4. The team that would win the most games between the two in a season would be awarded the Silver Boot.

=== Season standings ===
AL West
Team	W	L	Pct.	GB	Home	Road
Seattle Mariners	116	46	.716	—	57‍–‍24	59‍–‍22
Oakland Athletics	102	60	.630	14	53‍–‍28	49‍–‍32
Anaheim Angels	75	87	.463	41	39‍–‍42	36‍–‍45
Texas Rangers	73	89	.451	43	41‍–‍41	32‍–‍48

=== Record vs. opponents ===
2001 American League record Source: MLB Standings Grid – 2001
Team	ANA	BAL	BOS	CWS	CLE	DET	KC	MIN	NYY	OAK	SEA	TB	TEX	TOR	NL
Anaheim	—	4–5	4–3	6–3	5–4	5–4	5–4	3–6	4–3	6–14	4–15	7–2	7–12	5–4	10–8
Baltimore	5–4	—	9–10	3–4	1–5	4–2	5–2	3–3	5–13–1	2–7	1–8	10–9	2–7	7–12	6–12
Boston	3–4	10–9	—	3–3	3–6	4–5	3–3	3–3	5–13	4–5	3–6	14–5	5–2	12–7	10–8
Chicago	3–6	4–3	3–3	—	10–9	13–6	14–5	5–14	1–5	1–8	2–7	5–2	7–2	3–3	12–6
Cleveland	4–5	5–1	6–3	9–10	—	13–6	11–8	14–5	4–5	4–3	2–5	5–1	5–4	2–4	7–11
Detroit	4–5	2–4	5–4	6–13	6–13	—	8–11	4–15	4–5	1–6	2–5	4–2	8–1	2–4	10–8
Kansas City	4–5	2–5	3–3	5–14	8–11	11–8	—	6–13	0–6	3–6	3–6	4–2	4–5	4–3	8–10
Minnesota	6–3	3–3	3–3	14–5	5–14	15–4	13–6	—	4–2	5–4	1–8	1–6	4–5	2–5	9–9
New York	3–4	13–5–1	13–5	5–1	5–4	5–4	6–0	2–4	—	3–6	3–6	13–6	3–4	11–8	10–8
Oakland	14–6	7–2	5–4	8–1	3–4	6–1	6–3	4–5	6–3	—	9–10	7–2	9–10	6–3	12–6
Seattle	15–4	8–1	6–3	7–2	5–2	5–2	6–3	8–1	6–3	10–9	—	7–2	15–5	6–3	12–6
Tampa Bay	2–7	9–10	5–14	2–5	1–5	2–4	2–4	6–1	6–13	2–7	2–7	—	4–5	9–10	10–8
Texas	12–7	7–2	2–5	2–7	4–5	1–8	5–4	5–4	4–3	10–9	5–15	5–4	—	3–6	8–10
Toronto	4–5	12–7	7–12	3–3	4–2	4–2	3–4	5–2	8–11	3–6	3–6	10–9	6–3	—	8–10

=== Transactions ===
- June 5, 2001: Mark Teixeira was drafted by the Texas Rangers in the 1st round (5th pick) of the 2001 amateur draft. Player signed August 24, 2001.
- June 12, 2001: Justin Duchscherer was traded by the Boston Red Sox to the Texas Rangers for Doug Mirabelli.
- July 2, 2001: Ken Caminiti was released by the Texas Rangers.
- July 24, 2001: Andrés Galarraga was traded by the Texas Rangers to the San Francisco Giants for Todd Ozias (minors), Chris Magruder and Erasmo Ramirez.
- August 31, 2001: Randy Velarde was traded by the Texas Rangers to the New York Yankees for players to be named later. The New York Yankees sent Randy Flores (October 12, 2001) and Rosman García (October 11, 2001) to the Texas Rangers to complete the trade.

=== Roster ===
2001 Texas Rangers
Roster
Pitchers: 6 Rob Bell; 53 Joaquín Benoit; 45 Jeff Brantley; 30 Francisco Cordero; 35 Tim Crabtree; 17 Doug Davis; 51 R. A. Dickey; 45 Justin Duchscherer; 56 Kevin Foster; 38 Ryan Glynn; 32 Rick Helling; 50 Jonathan Johnson; 58 Mike Judd; 52 Dan Kolb; 23 Pat Mahomes; 55 Chris Michalak; 41,52 Juan Moreno; 39 Aaron Myette; 28 Darren Oliver; 46 Mark Petkovsek; 37 Kenny Rogers; 44 J. D. Smart; 43 Mike Venafro; 50 Brandon Villafuerte; 59 Jeff Zimmerman	Catchers: 33 Bill Haselman; 36 Mike Hubbard; 57 Marcus Jensen; 6 Doug Mirabelli; 7 Iván Rodríguez; Infielders: 11,41 Ken Caminiti; 44 Kelly Dransfeldt; 14 Andrés Galarraga; 13 Mike Lamb; 25 Rafael Palmeiro; 15 Carlos Peña; 3 Alex Rodriguez; 4 Scott Sheldon; 18 Randy Velarde; 2 Michael Young	Outfielders: 57 Cliff Brumbaugh; 27 Frank Catalanotto; 9 Chad Curtis; 29 Rusty Greer; 19 Gabe Kapler; 11,12 Ricky Ledée; 11 Chris Magruder; 21 Rubén Mateo; 21 Craig Monroe; 16 Bo Porter; 24 Rubén Sierra	Manager: 5 Jerry Narron; 26 Johnny Oates; Coaches: 40 Bobby Cuellar (Pitching); 20 Bucky Dent (Bench); 48 Larry Hardy (Bullpen); 8 Rudy Jaramillo (Hitting); 31 Bobby Jones (First Base); 5 Jerry Narron (Third Base)

=== Alex Rodriguez ===
Alex Rodriguez's power hitting numbers improved with his move to Texas. In his first season with the Rangers, Alex produced one of the top offensive seasons ever for a shortstop, leading the American League with 52 HR, 133 runs scored, and 393 total bases. He became the first player since 1932 with 50 homers and 200 hits in a season, just the third shortstop to ever lead his league in homers, and was just the second AL player in the last 34 seasons (beginning 1968) to lead the league in runs, homers, and total bases; his total base figure is the most ever for a major league shortstop. His 52 homers made him the sixth youngest to ever reach 50 homers and were the highest total ever by a shortstop, surpassing Ernie Banks' mark of 47 in 1958, and also the most ever for an infielder other than a first baseman, breaking Phillies 3B Mike Schmidt's record of 48 in 1980.

It was his 5th 30-homer campaign, tying Banks for most ever by a shortstop. He also tied for the league lead in extra base hits (87) and ranked 3rd in RBI (135) and slugging (.622). He was also among the AL leaders in hits (4th, 201), average (7th, .318), and on-base percentage (8th, .399). He established Rangers club records for homers, runs, total bases, and hit by pitches, had the 2nd most extra base hits, and the 4th highest RBI total. He led the club in runs, hits, doubles (34), homers, RBI, slugging, and on-base percentage and was 2nd in walks (75), stolen bases (18), and game-winning RBI (14) while posting career highs for homers, RBI, and total bases. Rodriguez started 161 games at shortstop and one as the DH, the only major league player to start all of his team's games in 2001.

== Player stats ==
=== Batting ===
==== Starters by position ====
Note: Pos = Position; G = Games played; AB = At bats; H = Hits; Avg. = Batting average; HR = Home runs; RBI = Runs batted in

Pos	Player	G	AB	H	Avg.	HR	RBI
C	Iván Rodríguez	111	442	136	.308	25	65
1B	Rafael Palmeiro	160	600	164	.273	47	123
2B	Michael Young	101	386	96	.249	11	49
SS	Alex Rodriguez	162	632	201	.318	52	135
3B	Mike Lamb	76	284	87	.306	4	35
LF	Frank Catalanotto	133	463	153	.330	11	54
CF	Gabe Kapler	134	483	129	.267	17	72
RF	Ricky Ledée	78	242	56	.231	2	36
DH	Rubén Sierra	94	344	100	.291	23	67

==== Other batters ====
Note: G = Games played; AB = At bats; H = Hits; Avg. = Batting average; HR = Home runs; RBI = Runs batted in

Player	G	AB	H	Avg.	HR	RBI
Randy Velarde	78	296	88	.297	9	31
Rusty Greer	62	245	67	.273	7	29
Andrés Galarraga	72	243	57	.235	10	34
Ken Caminiti	54	185	43	.232	9	25
Bill Haselman	47	130	37	.285	3	25
Rubén Mateo	40	129	32	.248	1	13
Scott Sheldon	61	120	24	.200	3	11
Chad Curtis	38	115	29	.252	3	10
Bo Porter	48	87	20	.230	1	6
Carlos Peña	22	62	16	.258	3	12
Craig Monroe	27	52	11	.212	2	5
Doug Mirabelli	23	49	5	.102	2	3
Chris Magruder	17	29	5	.172	0	1
Marcus Jensen	11	25	4	.160	0	2
Mike Hubbard	5	11	3	.273	1	1
Cliff Brumbaugh	7	10	0	.000	0	0
Kelly Dransfeldt	4	3	0	.000	0	0

=== Pitching ===
==== Starting pitchers ====
Note: G = Games pitched; IP = Innings pitched; W = Wins; L = Losses; ERA = Earned run average; SO = Strikeouts

Player	G	IP	W	L	ERA	SO
Rick Helling	34	215.2	12	11	5.17	154
Doug Davis	30	186.0	11	10	4.45	115
Darren Oliver	28	154.0	11	11	6.02	104
Kenny Rogers	20	120.2	5	7	6.19	74
Rob Bell	18	105.1	5	5	7.18	64
Aaron Myette	19	80.2	4	5	7.14	67
Joaquin Benoit	1	5.0	0	0	10.80	4

==== Other pitchers ====
Note: G = Games pitched; IP = Innings pitched; W = Wins; L = Losses; ERA = Earned run average; SO = Strikeouts

Player	G	IP	W	L	ERA	SO
Ryan Glynn	12	46.0	1	5	7.04	15
Justin Duchscherer	5	14.2	1	1	12.27	11
Mike Judd	4	9.0	0	1	8.00	5

==== Relief pitchers ====
Note: G = Games pitched; W = Wins; L = Losses; SV = Saves; ERA = Earned run average; SO = Strikeouts

Player	G	W	L	SV	ERA	SO
Jeff Zimmerman	66	4	4	28	2.40	72
Mike Venafro	70	5	5	4	4.80	29
Pat Mahomes	56	7	6	0	5.70	61
Mark Petkovsek	55	1	2	0	6.69	42
Juan Moreno	45	3	3	0	3.92	36
Tim Crabtree	21	0	5	4	6.56	16
Jeff Brantley	18	0	1	0	5.14	11
Danny Kolb	17	0	0	0	4.70	15
J.D. Smart	15	1	2	0	6.46	10
Chris Michalak	11	2	2	1	3.32	10
Kevin Foster	9	0	1	0	6.62	16
Brandon Villafuerte	6	0	0	0	14.29	4
Jonathan Johnson	5	0	0	0	9.58	11
R.A. Dickey	4	0	1	0	6.75	4
Francisco Cordero	3	0	1	0	3.86	1

== Awards and honors ==
- Alex Rodriguez, Hank Aaron Award
- Alex Rodriguez, A.L. Home Run Champ
- Alex Rodriguez, Silver Slugger Award
- Iván Rodríguez, C, Gold Glove
- Rubén Sierra, Comeback Player of The Year

All-Star Game

== Farm system ==
Level	Team	League	Manager
AAA	Oklahoma RedHawks	Pacific Coast League	DeMarlo Hale
AA	Tulsa Drillers	Texas League	Paul Carey
A	Charlotte Rangers	Florida State League	Darryl Kennedy
A	Savannah Sand Gnats	South Atlantic League	Bill Slack and Pedro López
Rookie	Pulaski Rangers	Appalachian League	Bruce Crabbe
Rookie	GCL Rangers	Gulf Coast League	Carlos Subero
