= 2001 Oakland Athletics season =

2001 Oakland Athletics
- American League Wild Card winners
- League: American League
- Division: West
- Ballpark: Network Associates Coliseum
- City: Oakland, California
- Record: 102–60 (.630)
- Divisional place: 2nd
- Owners: Stephen Schott & Kenneth Hofmann
- General managers: Billy Beane
- Managers: Art Howe
- Television: KICU-TV; FSN Bay Area (Ray Fosse, Greg Papa)
- Radio: KABL (Bill King, Ken Korach, Ray Fosse)

The 2001 Oakland Athletics season was the team's 34th in Oakland, California, and the 101st season in franchise history. The team finished second in the American League West with a record of 102–60.

The Athletics entered the 2001 season with high expectations. Much of the excitement stemmed from the team's trio of promising young starting pitchers (Barry Zito, Mark Mulder, and Tim Hudson); after a strong showing in 2000, many expected the Athletics' rotation to rank among the American League's best in 2001. The trade of additional starter Cory Lidle during the 2000-01 offseason helped solidify the rotation's back-end. On offense, the Athletics were loaded; sluggers Miguel Tejada, Eric Chavez, and reigning American League MVP Jason Giambi comprised the core of a powerful Oakland attack. The addition of Johnny Damon, acquired in a three-way trade for Ben Grieve, promised to add a new dimension to the Athletics' offense. A strong bullpen (led by Chad Bradford, Jim Mecir, and Jason Isringhausen) rounded out Oakland's roster.

These high expectations quickly evaporated as the Athletics won just two of their first dozen games. While their play nominally improved over the first half of the season, they failed to build upon the momentum of their division-winning 2000 campaign. The rival Seattle Mariners, in stark contrast, raced to a historic 52–14 start. As expected, the offense performed well; Oakland was instead hamstrung by unexpectedly poor starting pitching. At the season's midpoint, the A's boasted a sub-.500 record (39–42); they trailed the division-leading Mariners by some 21 games.

The Athletics responded with one of the most dominant second halves in modern MLB history. Over their final 81 regular season games, the team went 63-18 (a record since the league switched to a 162-game schedule); this included 29 wins in their final 33 games. The Athletics' maligned rotation returned to form; over their final games, Zito, Mulder, Hudson, and Lidle went a combined 48-10. On July 25, the Athletics acquired slugger Jermaine Dye from the Kansas City Royals for prospects; this move further energized the already-surging squad. The Athletics were not able to catch up with Seattle (which won an AL-record 116 games), but their run allowed them to clinch the AL's Wild Card. The Athletics' 102 wins were at the time the most by a Wild Card clincher in MLB history.

The Athletics faced the New York Yankees (the three-time defending World Series champions) in the ALDS. Oakland took the first two games, but unraveled after a heartbreaking 1–0 loss in Game 3, in which Jeremy Giambi was thrown out at the plate after a relay throw was flipped by Derek Jeter to Jorge Posada; they lost the series to the Yankees in five games. At the end of the season, Oakland lost Giambi, Damon, and Isringhausen to free agency; this set the stage for the events portrayed in Michael Lewis' bestselling book Moneyball: The Art of Winning an Unfair Game and its film adaptation.

== Offseason ==
- November 17, 2000: Randy Velarde was traded by the Athletics to the Texas Rangers for Aaron Harang and Ryan Cullen (minors).
- January 8, 2001: Ben Grieve was traded by the Athletics to the Tampa Bay Devil Rays, and Ángel Berroa and A. J. Hinch were traded by the Athletics to the Kansas City Royals as part of a three-team trade. The Royals sent Johnny Damon and Mark Ellis to the Athletics, and the Devil Rays sent Cory Lidle to the Athletics. The Devil Rays sent Roberto Hernández to the Royals.

== Regular season ==
=== Season standings ===
AL West
Team	W	L	Pct.	GB	Home	Road
Seattle Mariners	116	46	.716	—	57‍–‍24	59‍–‍22
Oakland Athletics	102	60	.630	14	53‍–‍28	49‍–‍32
Anaheim Angels	75	87	.463	41	39‍–‍42	36‍–‍45
Texas Rangers	73	89	.451	43	41‍–‍41	32‍–‍48

=== Record vs. opponents ===
2001 American League record Source: MLB Standings Grid – 2001
Team	ANA	BAL	BOS	CWS	CLE	DET	KC	MIN	NYY	OAK	SEA	TB	TEX	TOR	NL
Anaheim	—	4–5	4–3	6–3	5–4	5–4	5–4	3–6	4–3	6–14	4–15	7–2	7–12	5–4	10–8
Baltimore	5–4	—	9–10	3–4	1–5	4–2	5–2	3–3	5–13–1	2–7	1–8	10–9	2–7	7–12	6–12
Boston	3–4	10–9	—	3–3	3–6	4–5	3–3	3–3	5–13	4–5	3–6	14–5	5–2	12–7	10–8
Chicago	3–6	4–3	3–3	—	10–9	13–6	14–5	5–14	1–5	1–8	2–7	5–2	7–2	3–3	12–6
Cleveland	4–5	5–1	6–3	9–10	—	13–6	11–8	14–5	4–5	4–3	2–5	5–1	5–4	2–4	7–11
Detroit	4–5	2–4	5–4	6–13	6–13	—	8–11	4–15	4–5	1–6	2–5	4–2	8–1	2–4	10–8
Kansas City	4–5	2–5	3–3	5–14	8–11	11–8	—	6–13	0–6	3–6	3–6	4–2	4–5	4–3	8–10
Minnesota	6–3	3–3	3–3	14–5	5–14	15–4	13–6	—	4–2	5–4	1–8	1–6	4–5	2–5	9–9
New York	3–4	13–5–1	13–5	5–1	5–4	5–4	6–0	2–4	—	3–6	3–6	13–6	3–4	11–8	10–8
Oakland	14–6	7–2	5–4	8–1	3–4	6–1	6–3	4–5	6–3	—	9–10	7–2	9–10	6–3	12–6
Seattle	15–4	8–1	6–3	7–2	5–2	5–2	6–3	8–1	6–3	10–9	—	7–2	15–5	6–3	12–6
Tampa Bay	2–7	9–10	5–14	2–5	1–5	2–4	2–4	6–1	6–13	2–7	2–7	—	4–5	9–10	10–8
Texas	12–7	7–2	2–5	2–7	4–5	1–8	5–4	5–4	4–3	10–9	5–15	5–4	—	3–6	8–10
Toronto	4–5	12–7	7–12	3–3	4–2	4–2	3–4	5–2	8–11	3–6	3–6	10–9	6–3	—	8–10

=== Notable transactions ===
- June 5, 2001: 2001 Major League Baseball draft
  - Neal Cotts was drafted by the Athletics in the 2nd round. Player signed June 13, 2001.
  - Dan Johnson was drafted by the Athletics in the 7th round. Player signed June 18, 2001.
- July 25, 2001: José Ortiz, Todd Belitz and Mario Encarnación were traded by the Athletics to the Colorado Rockies for Jermaine Dye.

=== Roster ===
2001 Oakland Athletics
Roster
Pitchers: 53 Chad Bradford; 49 Mike Fyhrie; 19 Mark Guthrie; 32 Chad Harville; 31 Gil Heredia; 37 Erik Hiljus; 15 Tim Hudson; 44 Jason Isringhausen; 21 Cory Lidle; 52 Mike Magnante; 33 T.J. Mathews; 45 Jim Mecir; 20 Mark Mulder; 29 Jeff Tam; 51 Luis Vizcaíno; 75 Barry Zito	Catchers: 13 Sal Fasano; 55 Ramón Hernández; 24,28 Greg Myers; 17 Tom Wilson; Infielders: 30 Andy Abad; 14 Mark Bellhorn; 3 Eric Chavez; 16 Jason Giambi; 11 Frank Menechino; 2 José Ortiz; 9 Olmedo Sáenz; 2 F. P. Santangelo; 4 Miguel Tejada	Outfielders: 22 Eric Byrnes; 28 Ryan Christenson; 8 Johnny Damon; 26,24 Jermaine Dye; 5 Ron Gant; 7 Jeremy Giambi; 30 Robin Jennings; 12 Terrence Long; 13 Billy McMillon; 6 Adam Piatt; 26 Rob Ryan; 23 Mario Valdez; Other batters: 5 John Jaha	Manager: 18 Art Howe; Coaches: 41 Thad Bosley (Hitting); 35 Brad Fischer (Bullpen); 39 Ken Macha (Bench); 47 Rick Peterson (Pitching); 48 Mike Quade (First Base); 38 Ron Washington (Third Base)

== Postseason ==
The A's lost 3-2 to the New York Yankees in the 2001 American League Division Series.

== Player stats ==
=== Batting ===
==== Starters by position ====
Note: Pos = Position; G = Games played; AB = At bats; H = Hits; Avg. = Batting average; HR = Home runs; RBI = Runs batted in

Pos	Player	G	AB	H	Avg.	HR	RBI
C	Ramón Hernández	156	453	115	.254	15	60
1B	Jason Giambi	154	520	178	.342	38	120
2B	Frank Menechino	139	471	114	.242	12	60
SS	Miguel Tejada	162	622	166	.267	31	113
3B	Eric Chavez	151	552	159	.288	32	114
LF	Terrence Long	162	629	178	.283	12	85
CF	Johnny Damon	155	644	165	.256	9	49
RF	Jermaine Dye	61	232	69	.297	13	59
DH	Jeremy Giambi	124	371	105	.283	12	57

==== Other batters ====
Note: G = Games played; AB = At bats; H = Hits; Avg = Batting average; HR = Home runs; RBI = Runs batted in

Player	G	AB	H	Avg.	HR	RBI
Olmedo Sáenz	106	305	67	.220	9	32
Adam Piatt	36	95	20	.211	0	6
Greg Myers	33	87	16	.184	7	13
Ron Gant	34	81	21	.259	2	13
Mark Bellhorn	38	74	10	.135	1	4
F.P. Santangelo	32	71	14	.197	0	8
Billy McMillon	20	58	17	.293	0	10
Mario Valdez	32	54	15	.278	1	8
Robin Jennings	20	52	13	.250	0	4
John Jaha	12	45	4	.089	0	8
José Ortiz	11	42	7	.167	0	3
Eric Byrnes	19	38	9	.237	3	5
Tom Wilson	9	21	4	.190	2	4
Sal Fasano	11	21	1	.048	0	0
Rob Ryan	7	7	0	.000	0	0
Ryan Christenson	7	4	0	.000	0	0
Andy Abad	1	1	0	.000	0	0

=== Pitching ===
==== Starting pitchers ====
Note: G = Games; IP = Innings pitched; W = Wins; L = Losses; ERA = Earned run average; SO = Strikeouts

Player	G	IP	W	L	ERA	SO
Tim Hudson	35	235.0	18	9	3.37	181
Mark Mulder	34	229.1	21	8	3.45	153
Barry Zito	35	214.1	17	8	3.49	205
Cory Lidle	29	188.0	13	6	3.59	118
Gil Heredia	24	109.2	7	8	5.58	48
Erik Hiljus	16	66.0	5	0	3.41	67

==== Relief pitchers ====
Note: G = Games; W = Wins; L = Losses; SV = Saves; ERA = Earned run average; SO = Strikeouts

Player	G	W	L	SV	ERA	SO
Jason Isringhausen	65	4	3	34	2.65	74
Jeff Tam	70	2	4	3	3.01	44
Mike Magnante	65	3	1	0	2.77	23
Jim Mecir	54	2	8	3	3.43	61
Mark Guthrie	54	6	2	1	4.47	52
Luis Vizcaíno	36	2	1	1	4.66	31
Chad Bradford	35	2	1	1	2.70	34
T.J. Mathews	20	0	1	1	5.09	19
Mike Fyhrie	3	0	0	0	0.00	5
Chad Harville	3	0	0	0	0.00	2

== Awards and records ==
- Jason Giambi, Silver Slugger Award

== Farm system ==
Level	Team	League	Manager
AAA	Sacramento River Cats	Pacific Coast League	Bob Geren
AA	Midland RockHounds	Texas League	Tony DeFrancesco
A	Modesto A's	California League	Greg Sparks
A	Visalia Oaks	California League	Juan Navarrette
A-Short Season	Vancouver Canadians	Northwest League	Webster Garrison
Rookie	AZL Athletics	Arizona League	Ricky Nelson

LEAGUE CHAMPIONS: AZL Athletics
