= 2001 Minnesota Twins season =

2001 Minnesota Twins
- League: American League
- Division: Central
- Ballpark: Hubert H. Humphrey Metrodome
- City: Minneapolis
- Record: 85–77 (.525)
- Divisional place: 2nd
- Owners: Carl Pohlad
- General managers: Terry Ryan
- Managers: Tom Kelly
- Television: KMSP-TV; Midwest Sports Channel (Bert Blyleven, Dick Bremer)
- Radio: 830 WCCO AM (Herb Carneal, John Gordon, Dan Gladden)

The 2001 Minnesota Twins season was the 41st season for the Minnesota Twins franchise in the Twin Cities of Minnesota, their 20th season at Hubert H. Humphrey Metrodome and the 101st overall in the American League.

The season marked the beginning of the Twins' ascendancy in the American League Central. After finishing the 2000 season last in the division with a disappointing 69–93 record, the 2001 team rebounded to finish 85–77, good enough for second place in the division. This was the Twins' first winning season since 1992. The six-year run of winning seasons that followed is the longest such stretch in franchise history. In his last year as manager, Tom Kelly continued the development of a core of young players who would win their division the following year.

Third baseman Corey Koskie hit 26 home runs and stole 27 bases, the only Twins player to steal at least 25 bases and hit 25 home runs in the same season.

== Regular season ==
- After years of having only one All-Star representative, the 2001 Twins had three: Cristian Guzmán, Joe Mays, and Eric Milton.
- The highest paid Twin in 2001 was Brad Radke at $7,750,000; followed by Todd Jones at $3,975,000.
- Herb Carneal and Jim Kaat were inducted into the Minnesota Twins Hall of Fame.

=== Offense ===
The team had consistent starters, many of whom performed well. First baseman Doug Mientkiewicz, who had a disappointing 1999 season and spent most of 2000 in the minors, had what seemed to be a breakout year, hitting .306 with 14 home runs and 74 RBI. Second baseman Luis Rivas appeared to be on the verge of breaking out as well, hitting .266 but stealing a team-leading 31 bases. Shortstop Cristian Guzmán built on his solid 2000 season by batting .302, stealing 25 bases, and once again leading the major leagues in triples with 14. His numbers were solid enough to earn him his first and only all-star berth. Third baseman Corey Koskie had his best year, hitting .276, with 26 home runs and 103 RBI. Amazingly, he also stole 27 bases. A. J. Pierzynski had a solid year for a catcher, batting .289 with 7 home runs. The "Soul Patrol" outfield of Jacque Jones in left, Torii Hunter in center, and Matt Lawton in right continued to impress, although Lawton was traded midway through the season. The biggest offensive question mark was the designated hitter position, with David Ortiz spending much of the year injured—as was often the case during his Twins tenure. He started only 78 games as the DH, with Chad Allen starting 22 and Brian Buchanan 19.

Team Leaders
Statistic	Player	Quantity
HR	Torii Hunter	27
RBI	Corey Koskie	103
BA	Doug Mientkiewicz	.306
Runs	Corey Koskie	100

=== Pitching ===
Brad Radke, Eric Milton, and Joe Mays capably filled the first three spots in the starting rotation throughout the year, with Milton and Mays earning all-star berths for their efforts. The final two spots were question marks, with Kyle Lohse making 16 uninspired starts, and J. C. Romero 11. (The team had still not figured out that Romero was better suited to the bullpen.) Because of the weak back end of the rotation, the team traded Lawton for pitcher Rick Reed midway through the year. Reed did not quite meet expectations, going 4–6 with a 5.19 ERA in twelve starts.

The bullpen was in flux. LaTroy Hawkins struggled as the team's closer, leading to Eddie Guardado earning 12 saves. Guardado, Jack Cressend, Todd Jones, and Mark Redman had serviceable years, but Bob Wells, Héctor Carrasco, and Juan Rincón did not.

Team Leaders
Statistic	Player	Quantity
ERA	Joe Mays	3.16
Wins	Joe Mays	17
Saves	LaTroy Hawkins	28
Strikeouts	Eric Milton	157

=== Defense ===
Like most of Tom Kelly's teams, the defense was exceptional. It was anchored by Mientkiewicz, who earned a Gold Glove award for his efforts. Rivas and Guzman were an impressive double-play combination, while Koskie improved defensively. After a season of uncertainty behind the plate in 2000, Pierzynski solidified the catcher position, backed up by Tom Prince. The speedy "Soul Patrol" outfield of Jones, Hunter, and Lawton was fun to watch. Lawton's departure left a void that Brian Buchanan would attempt to fill. However, as the team fell out of contention, he would give way to the platoon of Bobby Kielty and Dustan Mohr, known by fans collectively as "Dusty Kielmohr."

=== Season standings ===
AL Central
Team	W	L	Pct.	GB	Home	Road
Cleveland Indians	91	71	.562	—	44‍–‍36	47‍–‍35
Minnesota Twins	85	77	.525	6	47‍–‍34	38‍–‍43
Chicago White Sox	83	79	.512	8	46‍–‍35	37‍–‍44
Detroit Tigers	66	96	.407	25	37‍–‍44	29‍–‍52
Kansas City Royals	65	97	.401	26	35‍–‍46	30‍–‍51

=== Record vs. opponents ===
2001 American League record Source: MLB Standings Grid – 2001
Team	ANA	BAL	BOS	CWS	CLE	DET	KC	MIN	NYY	OAK	SEA	TB	TEX	TOR	NL
Anaheim	—	4–5	4–3	6–3	5–4	5–4	5–4	3–6	4–3	6–14	4–15	7–2	7–12	5–4	10–8
Baltimore	5–4	—	9–10	3–4	1–5	4–2	5–2	3–3	5–13–1	2–7	1–8	10–9	2–7	7–12	6–12
Boston	3–4	10–9	—	3–3	3–6	4–5	3–3	3–3	5–13	4–5	3–6	14–5	5–2	12–7	10–8
Chicago	3–6	4–3	3–3	—	10–9	13–6	14–5	5–14	1–5	1–8	2–7	5–2	7–2	3–3	12–6
Cleveland	4–5	5–1	6–3	9–10	—	13–6	11–8	14–5	4–5	4–3	2–5	5–1	5–4	2–4	7–11
Detroit	4–5	2–4	5–4	6–13	6–13	—	8–11	4–15	4–5	1–6	2–5	4–2	8–1	2–4	10–8
Kansas City	4–5	2–5	3–3	5–14	8–11	11–8	—	6–13	0–6	3–6	3–6	4–2	4–5	4–3	8–10
Minnesota	6–3	3–3	3–3	14–5	5–14	15–4	13–6	—	4–2	5–4	1–8	1–6	4–5	2–5	9–9
New York	3–4	13–5–1	13–5	5–1	5–4	5–4	6–0	2–4	—	3–6	3–6	13–6	3–4	11–8	10–8
Oakland	14–6	7–2	5–4	8–1	3–4	6–1	6–3	4–5	6–3	—	9–10	7–2	9–10	6–3	12–6
Seattle	15–4	8–1	6–3	7–2	5–2	5–2	6–3	8–1	6–3	10–9	—	7–2	15–5	6–3	12–6
Tampa Bay	2–7	9–10	5–14	2–5	1–5	2–4	2–4	6–1	6–13	2–7	2–7	—	4–5	9–10	10–8
Texas	12–7	7–2	2–5	2–7	4–5	1–8	5–4	5–4	4–3	10–9	5–15	5–4	—	3–6	8–10
Toronto	4–5	12–7	7–12	3–3	4–2	4–2	3–4	5–2	8–11	3–6	3–6	10–9	6–3	—	8–10

=== Roster ===
2001 Minnesota Twins
Roster
Pitchers: 19 Grant Balfour; 58 Héctor Carrasco; 28 Jack Cressend; 53 Mike Duvall; 52 Tony Fiore; 18 Eddie Guardado; 32 LaTroy Hawkins; 37 Adam Johnson; 59 Todd Jones; 49 Kyle Lohse; 25 Joe Mays; 20 Travis Miller; 21 Eric Milton; 22 Brad Radke; 55 Mark Redman; 36 Rick Reed; 39 Juan Rincón; 33 J. C. Romero; 57 Johan Santana; 56 Brad Thomas; 46 Bob Wells	Catchers: 24 Matthew LeCroy; 26 A. J. Pierzynski; 12 Tom Prince; Infielders: 38 Casey Blake; 5 Michael Cuddyer; 15 Cristian Guzmán; 7 Denny Hocking; 47 Corey Koskie; 9 Jason Maxwell; 16 Doug Mientkiewicz; 27 David Ortiz; 2 Luis Rivas	Outfielders: 31 Chad Allen; 40 John Barnes; 30 Brian Buchanan; 48 Torii Hunter; 11 Jacque Jones; 23 Bobby Kielty; 50 Matt Lawton; 8 Quinton McCracken; 17 Dustan Mohr	Manager: 10 Tom Kelly; Coaches: 35 Ron Gardenhire (third base); 4 Paul Molitor; 43 Rick Stelmaszek (bullpen); 44 Dick Such (pitching); 45 Scott Ullger; 13 Jerry White

=== Notable transactions ===
- February 12: Mike Oquist was signed as a free agent.
- March 28, 2001: Brandon Knight was returned (earlier rule 5 draft pick) by the Twins to the New York Yankees.
- March 30: Signed pitcher Héctor Carrasco as a free agent. (Carrasco had played for the Twins in 2000, but was traded to the Boston Red Sox in September.) Carrasco was granted free agency on October 19.
- April 13: Signed outfielder Quinton McCracken as a free agent. On October 8, he was granted free agency.
- May 30: Signed pitcher Tony Fiore as a free agent.
- June 5: In the amateur draft, the Twins drafted catcher and Minnesota native Joe Mauer with the first pick.
- July 28: Traded pitcher Mark Redman to the Detroit Tigers for pitcher Todd Jones. On November 5, Jones was granted free agency.
- July 30: Traded outfielder Matt Lawton to the New York Mets for pitcher Rick Reed.
- September 21: Casey Blake selected by the Baltimore Orioles off waivers. On October 8, the Twins re-acquired Blake off waivers from the Orioles.

== Player stats ==
=== Batting ===
==== Starters by position ====
Note: Pos = Position; G = Games played; AB = At bats; H = Hits; Avg. = Batting average; HR = Home runs; RBI = Runs batted in

Pos	Player	G	AB	H	Avg.	HR	RBI
C	A. J. Pierzynski	114	381	110	.289	7	55
1B	Doug Mientkiewicz	151	543	166	.306	15	74
2B	Luis Rivas	153	563	150	.266	7	47
SS	Christian Guzmán	118	493	149	.302	10	51
3B	Corey Koskie	153	562	155	.276	26	103
LF	Jacque Jones	149	475	131	.276	14	49
CF	Torii Hunter	148	564	147	.261	27	92
RF	Matt Lawton	103	376	110	.293	10	51
DH	David Ortiz	89	303	71	.234	18	48

==== Other batters ====
Note: G = Games played; AB = At bats; H = Hits; Avg. = Batting average; HR = Home runs; RBI = Runs batted in

Player	G	AB	H	Avg.	HR	RBI
Denny Hocking	112	327	82	.251	3	25
Brian Buchanan	69	197	54	.274	10	32
Tom Prince	64	196	43	.219	7	23
Chad Allen	57	175	46	.263	4	20
Bobby Kielty	37	104	26	.250	2	14
Jason Maxwell	39	68	13	.191	1	10
Quinton McCracken	24	64	14	.219	0	3
Dustan Mohr	20	51	12	.235	0	4
Matt LeCroy	15	40	17	.425	3	12
Casey Blake	13	22	7	.318	0	2
John Barnes	9	21	1	.048	0	0
Michael Cuddyer	8	18	4	.222	0	1

=== Pitching ===
==== Starting pitchers ====
Note: G = Games pitched; IP = Innings pitched; W = Wins; L = Losses; ERA = Earned run average; SO = Strikeouts

Player	G	IP	W	L	ERA	SO
Joe Mays	34	233.2	17	13	3.16	123
Brad Radke	33	226.0	15	11	3.94	137
Eric Milton	35	220.2	15	7	4.32	157
Kyle Lohse	19	90.1	4	7	5.68	64
Rick Reed	12	67.2	4	6	5.19	43
Mark Redman	9	49.0	2	4	4.22	29
Brad Thomas	5	16.1	0	2	9.37	6

==== Other pitchers ====
Note: G = Games pitched; IP = Innings pitched; W = Wins; L = Losses; ERA = Earned run average; SO = Strikeouts

Player	G	IP	W	L	ERA	SO
J.C. Romero	14	65.0	1	4	6.23	39
Johan Santana	15	43.2	2	4	4.22	29
Adam Johnson	7	25.0	1	2	8.28	17

==== Relief pitchers ====
Note: G = Games pitched; W = Wins; L = Losses; SV = Saves; ERA = Earned run average; SO = Strikeouts

Player	G	W	L	SV	ERA	SO
LaTroy Hawkins	62	1	5	28	5.96	36
Eddie Guardado	67	7	1	12	3.51	67
Bob Wells	65	8	5	2	5.11	49
Héctor Carrasco	56	4	3	1	4.64	70
Travis Miller	45	1	4	0	4.81	30
Jack Cressend	44	3	2	0	3.67	40
Todd Jones	24	1	0	2	3.26	15
Mike Duvall	8	0	0	0	7.71	4
Tony Fiore	4	0	1	0	5.68	5
Juan Rincón	4	0	0	0	6.35	4
Grant Balfour	2	0	0	0	13.50	2

== Other post-season awards ==
- Calvin R. Griffith Award (Most Valuable Twin) – Doug Mientkiewicz
- Joseph W. Haynes Award (Twins Pitcher of the Year) – Joe Mays
- Bill Boni Award (Twins Outstanding Rookie) – Luis Rivas
- Charles O. Johnson Award (Most Improved Twin) – Joe Mays
- Dick Siebert Award (Upper Midwest Player of the Year) – Aaron Sele
  - The above awards are voted on by the Twin Cities chapter of the BBWAA
- Carl R. Pohlad Award (Outstanding Community Service) – Corey Koskie
- Sherry Robertson Award (Twins Outstanding Farm System Player) – Michael Cuddyer

== Farm system ==
Level	Team	League	Manager
AAA	Edmonton Trappers	Pacific Coast League	John Russell
AA	New Britain Rock Cats	Eastern League	Stan Cliburn
A	Fort Myers Miracle	Florida State League	Jose Marzan
A	Quad Cities River Bandits	Midwest League	Jeff Carter
Rookie	Elizabethton Twins	Appalachian League	Rudy Hernández
Rookie	GCL Twins	Gulf Coast League	Al Newman

LEAGUE CO-CHAMPIONS: New Britain
