= 2001 Tampa Bay Devil Rays season =

2001 Tampa Bay Devil Rays
- League: American League
- Division: East
- Ballpark: Tropicana Field
- City: St. Petersburg, Florida
- Record: 62–100 (.383)
- Divisional place: 5th
- Owners: Vince Naimoli
- General managers: Chuck LaMar
- Managers: Larry Rothschild, Hal McRae
- Television: FSN Florida; WMOR-TV; WTSP; WTVT (Joe Magrane, Dewayne Staats)
- Radio: WFLA (Paul Olden, Charlie Slowes); WLCC (Ricardo Tavares, Enrique Oliu)

The 2001 Tampa Bay Devil Rays season was their fourth since the franchise was created. This season, they finished last in the American League East, finished the season with a record of 62–100. Their managers were Larry Rothschild and Hal McRae, the latter of whom replaced Rothschild shortly after the season began.

== Offseason ==
- November 2, 2000: Bill Pulsipher was signed as a free agent with the Tampa Bay Devil Rays.
- November 27, 2000: Quinton McCracken was released by the Tampa Bay Devil Rays.
- November 27, 2000: Jim Morris was released by the Tampa Bay Devil Rays.
- January 8, 2001: Johnny Damon was traded as part of a 3-team trade by the Kansas City Royals with Mark Ellis to the Oakland Athletics. The Oakland Athletics sent Ben Grieve to the Tampa Bay Devil Rays. The Oakland Athletics sent Ángel Berroa and A. J. Hinch to the Kansas City Royals. The Tampa Bay Devil Rays sent Cory Lidle to the Oakland Athletics. The Tampa Bay Devil Rays sent Roberto Hernandez to the Kansas City Royals.
- March 23, 2001: Bill Pulsipher was released by the Tampa Bay Devil Rays.

== Regular season ==
=== Opening Day starters ===
- Vinny Castilla
- Steve Cox
- John Flaherty
- Ben Grieve
- Albie Lopez
- Felix Martinez
- Fred McGriff
- Bob Smith
- Greg Vaughn
- Gerald Williams

=== Season standings ===
Wade Boggs's number 12 was retired by the Tampa Bay Rays in 2001.

AL East
Team	W	L	Pct.	GB	Home	Road
New York Yankees	95	65	.594	—	51‍–‍28	44‍–‍37
Boston Red Sox	82	79	.509	13½	41‍–‍40	41‍–‍39
Toronto Blue Jays	80	82	.494	16	40‍–‍42	40‍–‍40
Baltimore Orioles	63	98	.391	32½	30‍–‍50	33‍–‍48
Tampa Bay Devil Rays	62	100	.383	34	37‍–‍44	25‍–‍56

=== Record vs. opponents ===
2001 American League record Source: MLB Standings Grid – 2001
Team	ANA	BAL	BOS	CWS	CLE	DET	KC	MIN	NYY	OAK	SEA	TB	TEX	TOR	NL
Anaheim	—	4–5	4–3	6–3	5–4	5–4	5–4	3–6	4–3	6–14	4–15	7–2	7–12	5–4	10–8
Baltimore	5–4	—	9–10	3–4	1–5	4–2	5–2	3–3	5–13–1	2–7	1–8	10–9	2–7	7–12	6–12
Boston	3–4	10–9	—	3–3	3–6	4–5	3–3	3–3	5–13	4–5	3–6	14–5	5–2	12–7	10–8
Chicago	3–6	4–3	3–3	—	10–9	13–6	14–5	5–14	1–5	1–8	2–7	5–2	7–2	3–3	12–6
Cleveland	4–5	5–1	6–3	9–10	—	13–6	11–8	14–5	4–5	4–3	2–5	5–1	5–4	2–4	7–11
Detroit	4–5	2–4	5–4	6–13	6–13	—	8–11	4–15	4–5	1–6	2–5	4–2	8–1	2–4	10–8
Kansas City	4–5	2–5	3–3	5–14	8–11	11–8	—	6–13	0–6	3–6	3–6	4–2	4–5	4–3	8–10
Minnesota	6–3	3–3	3–3	14–5	5–14	15–4	13–6	—	4–2	5–4	1–8	1–6	4–5	2–5	9–9
New York	3–4	13–5–1	13–5	5–1	5–4	5–4	6–0	2–4	—	3–6	3–6	13–6	3–4	11–8	10–8
Oakland	14–6	7–2	5–4	8–1	3–4	6–1	6–3	4–5	6–3	—	9–10	7–2	9–10	6–3	12–6
Seattle	15–4	8–1	6–3	7–2	5–2	5–2	6–3	8–1	6–3	10–9	—	7–2	15–5	6–3	12–6
Tampa Bay	2–7	9–10	5–14	2–5	1–5	2–4	2–4	6–1	6–13	2–7	2–7	—	4–5	9–10	10–8
Texas	12–7	7–2	2–5	2–7	4–5	1–8	5–4	5–4	4–3	10–9	5–15	5–4	—	3–6	8–10
Toronto	4–5	12–7	7–12	3–3	4–2	4–2	3–4	5–2	8–11	3–6	3–6	10–9	6–3	—	8–10

=== Transactions ===
- April 4, 2001: Kenny Kely was purchased by the Seattle Mariners from the Tampa Bay Devil Rays.
- June 5, 2001: Dewon Brazelton was drafted by the Tampa Bay Devil Rays in the 1st round (3rd pick) of the 2001 amateur draft. Player signed August 25, 2001.
- June 5, 2001: Jon Switzer was drafted by the Tampa Bay Devil Rays in the 2nd round of the 2001 amateur draft. Player signed August 13, 2001.
- July 25, 2001: Mike DiFelice and Albie Lopez traded to Arizona Diamondbacks in exchange for Jason Conti and Nick Bierbrodt.
- July 27, 2001: Fred McGriff traded to Chicago Cubs in exchange for Manny Aybar and Player to be named later (Jason Smith).

=== Citrus Series ===
The annual interleague games between the Florida Marlins and the Tampa Bay Devil Rays were played in June and July. They are known as the Citrus Series. The Marlins won the series 4–2.

- June 15- @ Marlins 7- Devil Rays 4
- June 16- @ Marlins 11- Devil Rays 0
- June 17- @ Marlins 6- Devil Rays 4
- July 6- @ Devil Rays 5- Marlins 4 (11 innings)
- July 7- @ Devil Rays 4- Marlins 3
- July 8- Marlins 6- @ Devil Rays 1

=== Roster ===
2001 Tampa Bay Devil Rays
Roster
Pitchers: 32 Nick Bierbrodt; 59 Mickey Callaway; 46 Jesús Colomé; 38 Doug Creek; 36 Tony Fiore; 58 Travis Harper; 44 Ken Hill; 50 Mike Judd; 50 Joe Kennedy; 32 Albie Lopez; 37 Rusty Meacham; 61 Travis Phelps; 48 Ariel Prieto; 35 Bryan Rekar; 52 Brian Rose; 24 Ryan Rupe; 27 Bobby Seay; 53 Jason Standridge; 49 Tanyon Sturtze; 51 Jeff Wallace; 34 Dan Wheeler; 41 Paul Wilson; 43 Esteban Yan; 60 Víctor Zambrano	Catchers: 8 Mike DiFelice; 6 John Flaherty; 44 Toby Hall; 15 Paul Hoover; Infielders: 3 Brent Abernathy; 9 Vinny Castilla; 28 Steve Cox; 9 Chris Gomez; 19 Aubrey Huff; 25 Russ Johnson; 16 Félix Martínez; 29 Fred McGriff; 33 Damian Rolls; 10 Jared Sandberg; 26 Andy Sheets; 20 Bob Smith	Outfielders: 18 Ben Grieve; 30 José Guillén; 14 Jason Tyner; 23 Greg Vaughn; 4 Gerald Williams; 2 Randy Winn	Manager: 56 Hal McRae; 11 Larry Rothschild; Coaches: 12 Wade Boggs (hitting); 7 José Cardenal (first base); 5 Terry Collins (bullpen, third base); 10 Darren Daulton (catching, bullpen); 55 Glenn Ezell (bullpen); 54 Bill Fischer (pitching); 22 Billy Hatcher (third Base, bench); 47 Lee May (first base); 56 Hal McRae (bench)

== Player stats ==
=== Batting ===
==== Starters by position ====
Note: Pos = Position; G = Games played; AB = At bats; H = Hits; Avg. = Batting average; HR = Home runs; RBI = Runs batted in

Pos	Player	G	AB	H	Avg.	HR	RBI
C	John Flaherty	78	248	59	.238	4	29
1B	Steve Cox	108	342	88	.257	12	51
2B	Brent Abernathy	79	304	82	.270	5	33
SS	Félix Martínez	77	219	54	.247	1	14
3B	Aubrey Huff	111	411	102	.248	8	45
LF	Jason Tyner	105	396	111	.280	0	21
CF	Gerald Williams	62	232	48	.207	4	17
RF	Ben Grieve	154	542	143	.264	11	72
DH	Greg Vaughn	136	485	113	.233	24	82

==== Other batters ====
Note: G = Games played; AB = At bats; H = Hits; Avg. = Batting average; HR = Home runs; RBI = Runs batted in

Player	G	AB	H	Avg.	HR	RBI
Randy Winn	128	429	117	.273	6	50
Fred McGriff	97	343	109	.318	19	61
Russ Johnson	85	248	73	.294	4	33
Damian Rolls	81	237	62	.262	2	12
Chris Gomez	58	189	57	.302	8	36
Toby Hall	49	188	56	.298	4	30
Andy Sheets	49	153	30	.196	1	14
Mike DiFelice	48	149	31	.208	2	9
Jared Sandberg	39	136	28	.206	1	15
José Guillén	41	135	37	.274	3	11
Vinny Castilla	24	93	20	.215	2	9
Bob Smith	6	19	2	.105	0	1
Paul Hoover	3	4	1	.250	0	0

=== Pitching ===
==== Starting pitchers ====
Note: G = Games pitched; IP = Innings pitched; W = Wins; L = Losses; ERA = Earned run average; SO = Strikeouts

Player	G	IP	W	L	ERA	SO
Tanyon Sturtze	39	195.1	11	12	4.42	110
Ryan Rupe	28	143.1	5	12	6.59	123
Bryan Rekar	25	140.2	3	13	5.89	87
Albie Lopez	20	124.2	5	12	5.34	67
Joe Kennedy	20	117.2	7	8	4.44	78
Nick Bierbrodt	11	61.1	3	4	4.55	56
Travis Harper	2	7.0	0	2	7.71	2

==== Other pitchers ====
Note: G = Games pitched; IP = Innings pitched; W = Wins; L = Losses; ERA = Earned run average; ERA = Earned run average

Player	G	IP	W	L	ERA	SO
Paul Wilson	37	151.1	8	9	4.88	119
Brian Rose	7	20.1	0	2	8.85	11
Mike Judd	8	20.0	1	0	4.05	11
Jason Standridge	9	19.1	0	0	4.66	9

===== Relief pitchers =====
Note: G = Games pitched; W = Wins; L = Losses; SV = Saves; ERA = Earned run average; SO = Strikeouts

Player	G	W	L	SV	ERA	SO
Esteban Yan	54	4	6	22	3.90	64
Doug Creek	66	2	5	0	4.31	66
Travis Phelps	49	2	2	5	3.48	54
Victor Zambrano	36	6	2	2	3.16	58
Jesús Colomé	30	2	3	0	3.33	31
Jeff Wallace	29	0	3	0	3.40	38
Rusty Meacham	24	1	3	0	5.60	13
Dan Wheeler	13	1	0	0	8.66	12
Bobby Seay	12	1	1	0	6.23	12
Ken Hill	5	0	1	0	12.27	2
Ariel Prieto	3	0	0	0	2.45	2
Tony Fiore	3	0	0	0	5.40	3
Mickey Calloway	2	0	0	0	7.20	2

== Farm system ==
Level	Team	League	Manager
AAA	Durham Bulls	International League	Bill Evers
AA	Orlando Rays	Southern League	Mike Ramsey
A	Bakersfield Blaze	California League	Charlie Montoyo
A	Charleston RiverDogs	South Atlantic League	Buddy Biancalana
A-Short Season	Hudson Valley Renegades	New York–Penn League	Dave Howard
Rookie	Princeton Devil Rays	Appalachian League	Edwin Rodríguez
