= Juan Moreno (pitcher) =

Venezuelan baseball player (born 1975)

- Pitcher
- Born: Juan Carlos Moreno; February 28, 1975 (age 51); Maiquetía, Venezuela
- Batted: Left Threw: Left

MLB debut
- May 17, 2001, for the Texas Rangers

Last MLB appearance
- April 16, 2002, for the San Diego Padres

MLB statistics
- Win–loss record: 3–3
- Earned run average: 4.37
- Strikeouts: 39
- Stats at Baseball Reference

Teams
- Texas Rangers (2001); San Diego Padres (2002)

Juan Carlos Moreno (born February 28, 1975) is a Venezuelan former relief pitcher in Major League Baseball who played for the Texas Rangers (2001) and San Diego Padres (2002). He batted and threw left-handed.

His career lasted for two seasons. He had a 3–3 record, with 39 strikeouts and a 4.37 ERA, in 47 1/3 innings pitched.

== See also ==
- List of players from Venezuela in Major League Baseball
