= Mario Valdez (baseball) =

Mexican baseball player (born 1974)

- First baseman
- Born: November 19, 1974 (age 51); Ciudad Obregón, Sonora, Mexico
- Batted: Left Threw: Left

Professional debut
- MLB: June 15, 1997, for the Chicago White Sox
- NPB: July 2, 2004, for the Osaka Kintetsu Buffaloes

Last appearance
- MLB: June 22, 2001, for the Oakland Athletics
- NPB: August 27, 2004, for the Osaka Kintetsu Buffaloes

MLB statistics
- Batting average: .238
- Home runs: 2
- Runs batted in: 21

NPB statistics
- Batting average: .213
- Home runs: 9
- Runs batted in: 29
- Stats at Baseball Reference

Teams
- Chicago White Sox (1997); Oakland Athletics (2000–2001); Osaka Kintetsu Buffaloes (2004)
Medals
Men's baseball
Representing Mexico
Pan American Games
| Bronze medal – third place | 2007 Rio de Janeiro | Team |
Central American and Caribbean Games
| Bronze medal – third place | 2006 Cartagena | Team |

Mario Ayelar Valdez (born November 19, 1974) is a Mexican former professional baseball first baseman. He played during three Major League Baseball (MLB) seasons for the Chicago White Sox and Oakland Athletics. Valdez also played one season in Nippon Professional Baseball (NPB) for the Kintetsu Buffaloes in 2004.

== Early life and amateur career ==
Valdez was raised in a middle-class family in northern Mexico. He left his family as a teenager and moved to Miami, Florida not to pursue a baseball career but to learn English at an American high school in anticipation of attending an American university. He enrolled at Miami Senior High School for his final year of high school and earned a college baseball scholarship to Miami Dade College where he planned to study international business before returning to Mexico. To Valdez's surprise, he led the team with a .408 batting average as a sophomore.

== Professional career ==
Valdez was drafted by the White Sox in the 48th round of the 1993 amateur draft. Valdez played his first professional season with their rookie league (short season) GCL White Sox in 1994, and his last season with the independent Pensacola Pelicans of the Central Baseball League, in 2005. His last MLB-affiliated season was in 2003, when he played for the San Diego Padres' Triple-A unit, the Portland Beavers.

Valdez played with Mexican team Tomateros de Culiacan in winter ball in La Liga Mexicana del Pacifico. He debuted in 1995 with the team which won the championship the same year, also playing in 1996-1997, 2001-2002, 2003–2004 and the Caribbean Series in 1996-2002.
