= Chris Magruder =

American baseball player (born 1977)

- Outfielder
- Born: April 26, 1977 (age 47); Tacoma, Washington, U.S.
- Batted: Switch Threw: Right

MLB debut
- September 4, 2001, for the Texas Rangers

Last MLB appearance
- September 24, 2005, for the Milwaukee Brewers

MLB statistics
- Batting average: .220
- Home runs: 11
- Runs batted in: 56
- Stats at Baseball Reference

Teams
- Texas Rangers (2001); Cleveland Indians (2002–2003); Milwaukee Brewers (2004–2005)

Christopher James Magruder (born April 26, 1977) is a former Major League Baseball outfielder who played for the Texas Rangers, Cleveland Indians, and Milwaukee Brewers.

Magruder was drafted out of the University of Washington, where he played college baseball for the Huskies from 1996–1998, by the San Francisco Giants. He made his Major League debut in 2001 as a member of the Texas Rangers. Magruder elected free agency following the 2005 season, in lieu of an outright assignment to the Brewer's top minor league baseball affiliate, the Triple-A Nashville Sounds. He had served in a backup role as a reserve for the starting outfielders Carlos Lee, Geoff Jenkins, and Brady Clark.

Perhaps the single most significant moment of his career was his debut with the Indians. His first at bat as a member of the Tribe was a double off the wall in the 8th inning to break up a no-hit bid.

Former National Football League quarterback Jon Kitna is Magruder's first cousin.
