= Roy Smith (2000s pitcher) =

American baseball player (born 1976)

- Pitcher
- Born: May 18, 1976 (age 50); St. Petersburg, Florida
- Batted: Right Threw: Right

MLB debut
- May 26, 2001, for the Cleveland Indians

Last MLB appearance
- September 29, 2002, for the Cleveland Indians

MLB statistics
- Win–loss record: 0–0
- Earned run average: 5.24
- Strikeouts: 19
- Stats at Baseball Reference

Teams
- Cleveland Indians (2001–2002)

Walter Roy Smith (born May 18, 1976) is an American former Major League Baseball player. A pitcher, Smith played for the Cleveland Indians in 2001 and 2002.
