= Adam Johnson (baseball) =

American baseball player (born 1979)

- Pitcher
- Born: July 12, 1979 (age 46); San Jose, California, U.S.
- Batted: Right Threw: Right

MLB debut
- July 16, 2001, for the Minnesota Twins

Last MLB appearance
- September 28, 2003, for the Minnesota Twins

MLB statistics
- Win–loss record: 1–3
- Earned run average: 10.25
- Strikeouts: 17
- Stats at Baseball Reference

Teams
- Minnesota Twins (2001, 2003)

Adam Johnson (born July 12, 1979) is an American former professional baseball pitcher who played for the Minnesota Twins in 2001 and 2003.

Johnson attended and played baseball at Torrey Pines High School in San Diego. He was selected by the Minnesota Twins in the 25th round of the 1997 Major League Baseball draft but chose to play college baseball at Cal State Fullerton. Johnson set Fullerton's career record for strikeouts with 365 and was named the Pitcher of the Year in the Big West Conference in 2000. That year, he was selected by the Twins with the second pick in the 2000 Major League Baseball draft.

At the time of the draft, John Sickels wrote on ESPN.com that Johnson "[s]hould move through the minors quickly." Indeed, Johnson made his Major League Baseball debut just over a year later on July 16, 2001, against the St. Louis Cardinals, allowing three earned runs over six innings pitched. Johnson gave up 14 runs in his next 15 innings pitched and was replaced on the roster by outfielder Bobby Kielty. The Twins brought Johnson up again when rosters expanded in September. He finished the season with an earned run average (ERA) of 8.28.

In 2002, Johnson failed to make the Twins out of spring training. When he was given his assignment papers, he tore or crumpled them and stormed out of manager Ron Gardenhire's office. He spent the entire season in Triple-A with the Edmonton Trappers.

In 2003, Johnson was called up to the big leagues for the first time once the rosters expanded on September 1 after a full season at Triple-A Rochester. He appeared in two games that season. On September 28, he pitched in what would be his final Major League game and gave up six earned runs in a third of an inning pitched.

Johnson pitched until 2008 in the Oakland Athletics farm system, in the Mexican League with the Pericos de Puebla and in the independent Atlantic League of Professional Baseball and Golden Baseball League.

Johnson was widely considered a draft bust after the conclusion of his career.
