= Ben Grieve =

American baseball player (born 1976)

- Outfielder
- Born: May 4, 1976 (age 49); Arlington, Texas, U.S.
- Batted: Left Threw: Right

MLB debut
- September 3, 1997, for the Oakland Athletics

Last MLB appearance
- October 2, 2005, for the Chicago Cubs

MLB statistics
- Batting average: .269
- Home runs: 118
- Runs batted in: 492
- Stats at Baseball Reference

Teams
- Oakland Athletics (1997–2000); Tampa Bay Devil Rays (2001–2003); Milwaukee Brewers (2004); Chicago Cubs (2004–2005)

Career highlights and awards
- All-Star (1998); AL Rookie of the Year (1998)

Ben Grieve (born May 4, 1976) is an American former professional baseball outfielder who played nine seasons in Major League Baseball (MLB), mostly with the Oakland Athletics and the Tampa Bay Devil Rays.

Grieve was a prospect who won the 1998 American League Rookie of the Year award while playing for the Athletics. His father, Tom, also played in MLB.

== High school ==
Grieve attended Martin High School in Arlington, Texas, where he was teammates with Matt Blank and won a Texas baseball championship in 1993. As a senior in 1994, he hit .486. He benefited from receiving hitting instruction from Tom's former teammate and then-Texas Rangers hitting coach, Tom Robson. He also played basketball at Martin. He initially committed to play college baseball at TCU.

== Professional career ==
=== Oakland Athletics ===
Grieve was selected by the Oakland Athletics with the second pick of the 1994 Major League Baseball draft, behind Paul Wilson. Before the 1998 season, Baseball America ranked him the best prospect in baseball. In 1998, he hit .288, with 18 home runs and 89 RBIs posting a .840 OPS. His campaign earned him the American League Rookie of the Year Award. In 1999, he followed up with a solid season, hitting .265 with 28 home runs and 86 RBIs. In the 2000 season, he hit 27 home runs, drove in 104 RBIs, and hit .279. The Athletics won 91 games and the American League West division title. Following the 2000 season, he was involved in a three-team trade that sent him to the Tampa Bay Devil Rays. That trade sent Johnny Damon and Mark Ellis to the Athletics.

=== Tampa Bay Devil Rays ===
With the Devil Rays in 2001, he hit 11 HR with 72 RBI, Grieve's slugging percentage dropping a full 100 points from the prior year. The following season (2002) he battled injuries, but did manage to hit 19 home runs and drive in 64 RBI in 136 games. In 2003, in 55 games, he hit .230, with 4 home runs and 17 RBI in 165 at-bats.

=== Later career ===
Following the 2003 season, Grieve signed as a free agent with the Milwaukee Brewers; on August 31 of the 2004 season, they traded him to the Chicago Cubs. He served primarily as a back-up outfielder for both the Cubs and the Brewers that year. In all, he appeared in 123 games between the two teams, hitting just 8 home runs and driving in 35 runs.

Grieve departed the Cubs in the 2004–2005 offseason as a free agent; he eventually signed with the Pittsburgh Pirates as a non-roster invitee to 2005 spring training. He was cut by the Pirates prior to the regular season, which made him again a free agent. At the beginning of the 2005 season, he was signed by the Cubs to a minor-league contract, which assigned him to the Triple-A Iowa Cubs. During the season, he was up and down, having two short call-ups followed by activation midway through September (following roster expansion). He ended the 2005 season having played in just 23 games at the majors, during which he hit 1 home run and had 5 RBIs.

Grieve spent the 2006 season in the White Sox minor-league organization. He started the 2007 season still in the White Sox minor-league organization, a member of the AAA Charlotte Knights.

== Awards ==
- American League Rookie of the Year (1998)
- Baseball America High School All-American (1994)

== See also ==
- List of second-generation Major League Baseball players

Preceded by Nomar Garciaparra	Players Choice AL Most Outstanding Rookie; 1998	Succeeded by Carlos Beltrán
