= Jolbert Cabrera =

Colombian baseball player (born 1972)

- Outfielder / Infielder
- Born: December 8, 1972 (age 53); Cartagena, Colombia
- Batted: Right Threw: Right

Professional debut
- MLB: April 12, 1998, for the Cleveland Indians
- NPB: March 26, 2005, for the Fukuoka SoftBank Hawks

Last appearance
- MLB: September 28, 2008, for the Cincinnati Reds
- NPB: October 12, 2006, for the Fukuoka SoftBank Hawks

MLB statistics
- Batting average: .257
- Home runs: 18
- Runs batted in: 157

NPB statistics
- Batting average: .281
- Home runs: 16
- Runs batted in: 108
- Stats at Baseball Reference

Teams
- As player: Cleveland Indians (1998–2002); Los Angeles Dodgers (2002–2003); Seattle Mariners (2004); Fukuoka SoftBank Hawks (2005–2006); Cincinnati Reds (2008); As manager: Colombia (2023)

Jolbert Alexis Cabrera Ramírez (born December 8, 1972) is a Colombian former professional baseball player. He played in Major League Baseball for the Cleveland Indians (1998–2002), Los Angeles Dodgers (2002–2003), Seattle Mariners (2004), and Cincinnati Reds (2008). Cabrera batted and threw right-handed. He is the older brother of former shortstop Orlando Cabrera. The two played together during the 1997 season while members of the Ottawa Lynx, the Montreal Expos Triple-A affiliate.

== Professional career ==
Cabrera made his major league debut with the Indians on April 12, 1998, in the only game he played that season.

2001 was Cabrera's best statistical season in Cleveland, as he slashed a line of .261/3/38 with ten stolen bases for the division-winning Indians. A highlight of that 2001 season was in a nationally televised Sunday Night Baseball game on August 5, when Cleveland rallied from a 14–2 deficit in the seventh inning to win 15–14 on Cabrera's broken-bat, walk-off single off José Paniagua.

Cabrera was traded on July 22, 2002, to the Los Angeles Dodgers for minor league pitcher Lance Caraccioli. He remained there until an early season trade in 2004 sent him to Seattle. He was released in 2005.

During the 2007 offseason, Cabrera signed a minor league contract with the St. Louis Cardinals that included an invitation to spring training. After spending most of the year with their Triple-A affiliate, the Memphis Redbirds, Cabrera was released and signed a minor league contract with Colorado Rockies.

On January 5, 2008, Cabrera signed a minor league contract with the Cincinnati Reds and was called up to the majors on June 10. On September 7, 2008, Cabrera hit a walk-off single against the Cubs to win the game 4–3.

On January 12, 2009, he signed a minor league contract with an invitation to spring training with the Baltimore Orioles.

On January 15, 2010, it was reported that Cabrera had signed a minor league deal with the New York Mets with an invitation to spring training.

In an eight-year career, Cabrera had a batting average of .257 with 18 home runs and 157 RBI in 609 games.

== Coaching career ==
In 2017, Cabrera was a coach for Colombia in the World Baseball Classic, and in the 2023 WBC, he served as the team's manager.

In 2026, he was named as a fundamentals coach for the Sacramento River Cats the Triple-A affiliate of the San Francisco Giants.

== Personal life ==
Cabrera currently resides in Scottsdale, Arizona.
