= Jack Cressend =

American baseball player (born 1975)

- Pitcher
- Born: May 13, 1975 (age 51); New Orleans, Louisiana, U.S.
- Batted: Right Threw: Right

MLB debut
- August 26, 2000, for the Minnesota Twins

Last MLB appearance
- May 5, 2004, for the Cleveland Guardians

MLB statistics
- Win–loss record: 5–5
- Earned run average: 4.20
- Strikeouts: 104
- Stats at Baseball Reference

Teams
- Minnesota Twins (2000–2002); Cleveland Indians (2003–2004)

John Baptiste "Jack" Cressend III (born May 13, 1975) is an American former professional baseball pitcher. Cressend played for the Minnesota Twins (2000-2002) and Cleveland Guardians (2003-2004).

== Career ==
Cressend attended Mandeville High School and played college baseball for the Green Wave of Tulane University.

In 1995 and 1996, he played collegiate summer baseball for the Cotuit Kettleers of the Cape Cod Baseball League (CCBL). He posted a 7–1 record in 1995, and 7–0 in 1996 with a 1.89 ERA. Cressend was inducted into the CCBL Hall of Fame in 2010.

While at Tulane, he was named to the All-Tournament Team of the 1996 Conference USA baseball tournament, which Tulane won. After the tournament, he was signed to a contract by the Boston Red Sox, and began his professional career with the Lowell Spinners.

In nine games at Lowell, Cressend had a win–loss record of 3–2 and a 2.36 earned run average (ERA). The following year he played for the Sarasota Red Sox, and had an 8–11 record with a 3.80 ERA. In 1998, he spent the season with the Trenton Thunder, and had a 10–11 record with a 4.34 ERA. After three games the following season with the Thunder, the Red Sox released him.

The Minnesota Twins picked up Cressend after the Red Sox released him, and he spent the rest of the year with the New Britain Rock Cats. In 2000, the Twins converted him to a relief pitcher, and he had a 3.44 ERA in 54 games with the Salt Lake Buzz. As a result, the Twins promoted Cressend, and he made his major league debut on August 26, playing in 11 games his rookie season. He spent the 2001 season mostly with the major league squad, and had a 3–2 record and a 3.67 ERA in 44 games, following that up with a 5.91 ERA in 23 games the following season. In April that year, Cressend was suspended for three games after intentionally throwing a baseball at Ricky Gutierrez of the Cleveland Indians.

Cressend was released after the season, and was picked up by the Indians. He spent 2003 with the major league club, and had a 2–1 record and a 2.51 ERA in 33 games. He followed that up with a 6.32 ERA in 11 games, and spent the rest of the year with the Buffalo Bisons, where he had a 10–1 record. In 2005, he returned to the Red Sox organization, and spent his final professional season with the Pawtucket Red Sox, pitching in 40 games and finishing with a 5.06 ERA.

After his retirement, he became a scout for the Tampa Bay Rays from 2006 to 2008, was an assistant coach for the Tulane University and the University of Houston and then was an amateur scout and pitching consultant for the Rays from 2012 to 2014. He was hired in November 2014 to be a pitching crosschecker for the Los Angeles Dodgers.
