= Kris Wilson (baseball) =

American baseball player (born 1976)

- Pitcher
- Born: August 6, 1976 (age 50); Washington, D.C., U.S.
- Batted: Right Threw: Right

Professional debut
- MLB: July 28, 2000, for the Kansas City Royals
- KBO: April 7, 2007, for the Samsung Lions

Last appearance
- MLB: July 23, 2006, for the New York Yankees
- KBO: May 11, 2007, for the Samsung Lions

MLB statistics
- Win–loss record: 14–9
- Earned run average: 5.44
- Strikeouts: 142

KBO statistics
- Win–loss record: 1–6
- Earned run average: 3.79
- Strikeouts: 9
- Stats at Baseball Reference

Teams
- Kansas City Royals (2000–2003); New York Yankees (2006); Samsung Lions (2007)

Kristopher Kyle Wilson (born August 6, 1976) is a former professional baseball pitcher. He played parts of five seasons in Major League Baseball, one season in Korea, and two seasons in Italy.

== Amateur career ==
Wilson attended Georgia Tech, and in 1995 and 1996 he played collegiate summer baseball with the Falmouth Commodores of the Cape Cod Baseball League where he was named a league all-star in 1995.

== Professional career ==
Wilson was drafted in the ninth round of the 1997 Major League Baseball draft by the Kansas City Royals, for whom he pitched from 2000 to 2003. In Kansas City, he split time between the bullpen and starting rotation with 19 starts.

Wilson was signed by the New York Yankees as a free agent during the 2005 season on May 17, and was assigned to the Triple-A Columbus Clippers. He was called up from Columbus on July 5, 2006, and made a relief appearance against the Cleveland Indians, pitching two scoreless innings and giving up no hits. He made his only start for the Yankees on July 9 against the Tampa Bay Devil Rays replacing Shawn Chacón, lasting just 2 2/3 innings while giving up 3 runs on 5 hits. He was replaced in the starting rotation by newly acquired Sidney Ponson, and sent down to the bullpen. Wilson was designated for assignment on July 24.

Wilson signed with the Samsung Lions of the KBO, but was released by the Lions during the 2007 season. On December 8, 2007, Wilson signed with the Philadelphia Phillies, but did not pitch a game for the Phillies.
