= Tony Cogan =

American baseball player (born 1976)

- Pitcher
- Born: December 21, 1976 (age 49); Chicago, Illinois, U.S.
- Batted: Left Threw: Left

MLB debut
- April 2, 2001, for the Kansas City Royals

Last MLB appearance
- August 12, 2001, for the Kansas City Royals

MLB statistics
- Win–loss record: 0-4
- Earned run average: 5.84
- Strikeouts: 17
- Stats at Baseball Reference

Teams
- Kansas City Royals (2001)

Anthony Michael Cogan (born December 21, 1976) is a retired American professional baseball pitcher. He played part of one season in Major League Baseball in 2001 for the Kansas City Royals. Cogan, who has been listed as 6' 2", bats and throws left-handed.

== Baseball career ==
=== High school & college ===
Cogan, who is Jewish, attended Highland Park High School, which he graduated in 1995. Summer of his junior and senior years in high school he played for the Norwood Blues.

Cogan attended Stanford University, where he was a star pitcher. In 1996, he played collegiate summer baseball with the Chatham A's of the Cape Cod Baseball League. He received an Honorable Mention for the All-Pac-10 Southern Division team in his sophomore year (1997). He holds the record for career appearances by a Stanford pitcher, with 107 (all but one were in relief), and the single season record of 36. He was 18–7 in his college career, and his 15 saves is tied for the 5th-highest total in Stanford history. He was selected as Stanford's Most Inspirational Player in 1999.

=== Professional ball ===
Cogan was drafted by the Kansas City Royals in the 12th round of the 1999 amateur draft.

He moved from Single A to Triple A in 1999–2001. In 1999 he was a Northwest League All-Star, as he finished the season with a 1.36 ERA in 39.2 innings. In 2000, he was 9–7 with a 2.85 ERA playing for several minor league Royals affiliates.

After two years in the minor leagues, Cogan was called up to the Kansas City Royals on April 2, 2001. He pitched in 39 games in relief for the team that year, and had a 5.84 ERA. He was then sent to Omaha of the Pacific Coast League, where he was 1–1, with 2 saves and a 2.79 ERA.

He pitched in Double A ball for the Wichita Wranglers in the Texas League in 2002, going 4–6 with a 3.47 ERA, in 17 games (starting 16). Kansas City released Cogan on September 7.

Cogan was signed by the St. Louis Cardinals for the 2003 season and played with the AAA Memphis Redbirds. He had season-ending shoulder surgery in mid-April and was released on June 13.

In 2005 and 2006 Cogan pitched in for the Sioux Falls Canaries. In 2006, he went 7–5 with a 3.02 ERA. Cogan became a free agent after the 2006 season.

In 2007, he pitched for the Gary SouthShore RailCats of the Northern League. Cogan, the Railcats closer, led the Northern League in saves with 25, setting a new RailCats single-season club record. The 25 saves tied for the third-highest total in the history of the Northern League, and was the most for any N.L. pitcher since 2004. He also pitched in the Northern League All-Star Game, and made a team-leading 46 appearances out of the bullpen, with a 2.77 ERA. Opposing batters went 6 for 42 (.143) against him with men on base and two outs.

In 2008 the Northern League named Cogan pitcher of the week for May 26 – June 1. He went 2–0 with a 0.63 earned run average over 14.1 innings, striking out 14 hitters to bring his season total to a league high 25.

Cogan announced his retirement on February 20, 2010.
