= 2001 Major League Baseball season =

2001 MLB season
- League: Major League Baseball
- Sport: Baseball
- Duration: April 1 – November 4, 2001
- Games: 162
- Teams: 30
- TV partner(s): Fox/FX/Fox Family; ESPN

Draft
- Top draft pick: Joe Mauer
- Picked by: Minnesota Twins

Regular Season
- Season MVP: AL: Ichiro Suzuki (SEA); NL: Barry Bonds (SF)

Postseason
- AL champions: New York Yankees
- AL runners-up: Seattle Mariners
- NL champions: Arizona Diamondbacks
- NL runners-up: Atlanta Braves

World Series
- Champions: Arizona Diamondbacks
- Runners-up: New York Yankees
- World Series MVP: Randy Johnson and Curt Schilling (AZ)

MLB seasons
- ← 2000 2002 →

Locations of AL teams for the 2000–2004 MLB seasons
West Central East
Locations of NL teams for the 2001–2002 NL seasons
West Central East

The 2001 Major League Baseball season finished with the Arizona Diamondbacks defeating the New York Yankees in seven games for the World Series championship. The September 11 terrorist attacks on New York and Washington, D.C. pushed the end of the regular season from September 30 to October 7. Because of the attacks, the World Series was not completed until November 4. The 2001 World Series was the first World Series to end in November.

MLB used an unbalanced schedule for the first time since 1992 in the National League and 1978 in the American League. In all divisions except the NL Central and AL West each team played each of the other four teams in the same division 19 times. In the NL Central division foes met 16 or 17 times per season and in the AL West there were 19 or 20 games between each division foe.

This season included the Seattle Mariners tying the Major League regular season record of 116 wins, Barry Bonds breaking Mark McGwire's single-season home run record, and what some commentators described as a “patriotic return” of baseball following a week-long suspension of games after the September 11 attacks.

== Standings ==
=== American League ===
AL East
Team	W	L	Pct.	GB	Home	Road
^{(2)} New York Yankees	95	65	.594	—	51‍–‍28	44‍–‍37
Boston Red Sox	82	79	.509	13½	41‍–‍40	41‍–‍39
Toronto Blue Jays	80	82	.494	16	40‍–‍42	40‍–‍40
Baltimore Orioles	63	98	.391	32½	30‍–‍50	33‍–‍48
Tampa Bay Devil Rays	62	100	.383	34	37‍–‍44	25‍–‍56

AL Central
Team	W	L	Pct.	GB	Home	Road
^{(3)} Cleveland Indians	91	71	.562	—	44‍–‍36	47‍–‍35
Minnesota Twins	85	77	.525	6	47‍–‍34	38‍–‍43
Chicago White Sox	83	79	.512	8	46‍–‍35	37‍–‍44
Detroit Tigers	66	96	.407	25	37‍–‍44	29‍–‍52
Kansas City Royals	65	97	.401	26	35‍–‍46	30‍–‍51

AL West
Team	W	L	Pct.	GB	Home	Road
^{(1)} Seattle Mariners	116	46	.716	—	57‍–‍24	59‍–‍22
^{(4)} Oakland Athletics	102	60	.630	14	53‍–‍28	49‍–‍32
Anaheim Angels	75	87	.463	41	39‍–‍42	36‍–‍45
Texas Rangers	73	89	.451	43	41‍–‍41	32‍–‍48

=== National League ===
NL East
Team	W	L	Pct.	GB	Home	Road
^{(3)} Atlanta Braves	88	74	.543	—	40‍–‍41	48‍–‍33
Philadelphia Phillies	86	76	.531	2	47‍–‍34	39‍–‍42
New York Mets	82	80	.506	6	44‍–‍37	38‍–‍43
Florida Marlins	76	86	.469	12	46‍–‍34	30‍–‍52
Montreal Expos	68	94	.420	20	34‍–‍47	34‍–‍47

NL Central
Team	W	L	Pct.	GB	Home	Road
^{(1)} Houston Astros	93	69	.574	—	44‍–‍37	49‍–‍32
^{(4)} St. Louis Cardinals	93	69	.574	—	54‍–‍28	39‍–‍41
Chicago Cubs	88	74	.543	5	48‍–‍33	40‍–‍41
Milwaukee Brewers	68	94	.420	25	36‍–‍45	32‍–‍49
Cincinnati Reds	66	96	.407	27	27‍–‍54	39‍–‍42
Pittsburgh Pirates	62	100	.383	31	38‍–‍43	24‍–‍57

NL West
Team	W	L	Pct.	GB	Home	Road
^{(2)} Arizona Diamondbacks	92	70	.568	—	48‍–‍33	44‍–‍37
San Francisco Giants	90	72	.556	2	49‍–‍32	41‍–‍40
Los Angeles Dodgers	86	76	.531	6	44‍–‍37	42‍–‍39
San Diego Padres	79	83	.488	13	35‍–‍46	44‍–‍37
Colorado Rockies	73	89	.451	19	41‍–‍40	32‍–‍49

== Postseason ==
=== Bracket ===
Division Series (ALDS, NLDS)
1	Seattle	3
3	Cleveland	2
American League
2	NY Yankees	3
4	Oakland	2
1	Houston	0
3	Atlanta	3
National League
2	Arizona	3
4	St. Louis	2

League Championship Series (NLCS, ALCS)
1	Seattle	1
2	NY Yankees	4
3	Atlanta	1
2	Arizona	4

World Series
AL2	NY Yankees	3
NL2	Arizona	4

Note: Two teams in the same division could not meet in the division series.

== MLB statistical leaders ==
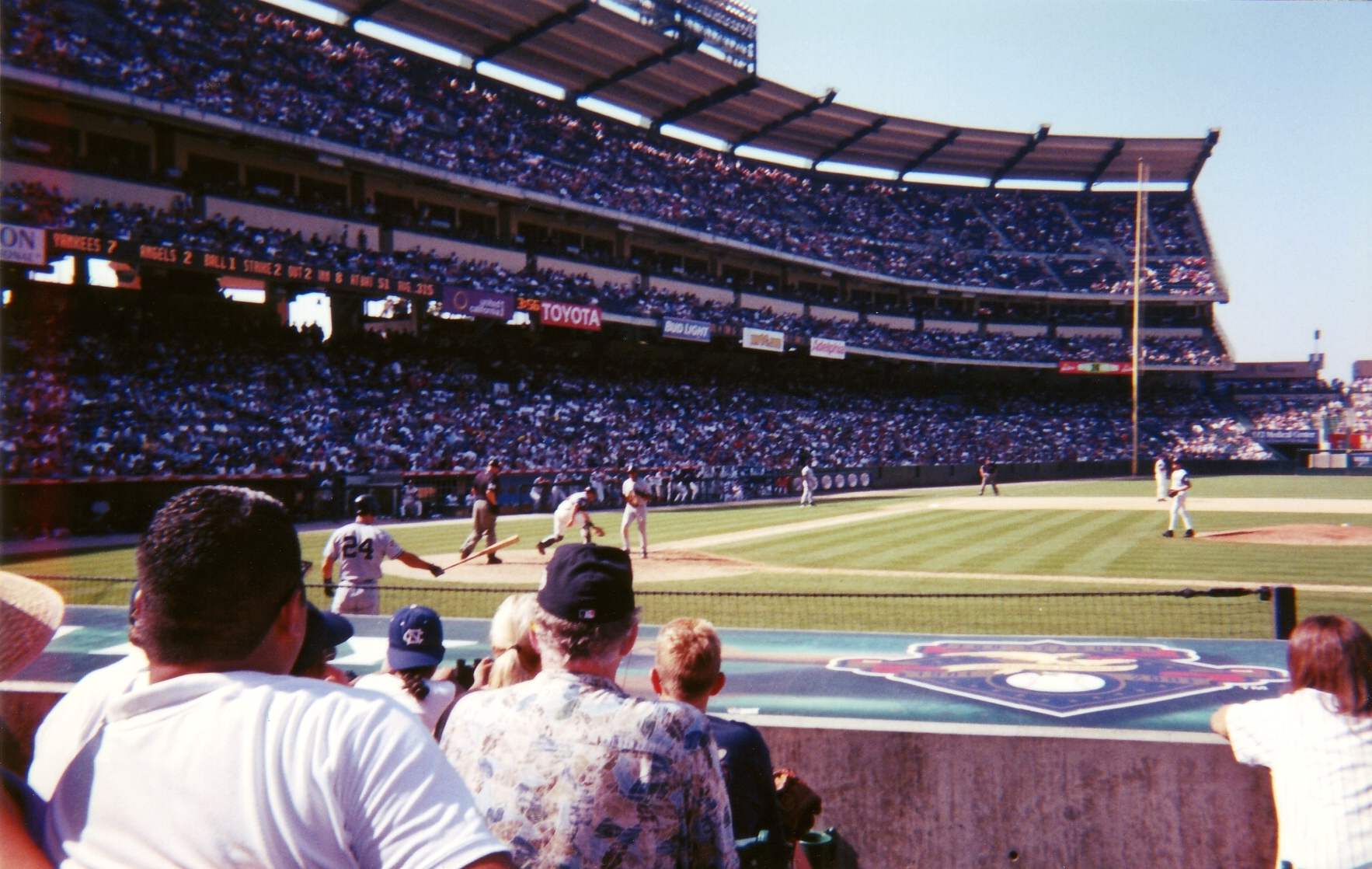
The Anaheim Angels hosting the season's eventual American League Champions New York Yankees in August 2001 at Edison International Field of Anaheim.

Statistic	American League		National League	
AVG	Ichiro Suzuki SEA	.350	Larry Walker COL	.350
HR	Alex Rodriguez TEX	52	Barry Bonds^{1} SF	73
RBI	Bret Boone SEA	141	Sammy Sosa CHC	160
Wins	Mark Mulder OAK	21	Matt Morris STL; Curt Schilling AZ	22
ERA	Freddy García SEA	3.05	Randy Johnson AZ	2.49
SO	Hideo Nomo BOS	220	Randy Johnson AZ	372
SV	Mariano Rivera NYY	50	Robb Nen SF	45
SB	Ichiro Suzuki SEA	56	Juan Pierre COL; Jimmy Rollins PHI	46

^{1} All-time single-season home runs record

== Managers ==
=== American League ===
Team	Manager	Comments
Anaheim Angels	Mike Scioscia	
Baltimore Orioles	Mike Hargrove	
Boston Red Sox	Jimy Williams	Replaced during the season by Joe Kerrigan
Chicago White Sox	Jerry Manuel	
Cleveland Indians	Charlie Manuel	
Detroit Tigers	Phil Garner	
Kansas City Royals	Tony Muser	
Minnesota Twins	Tom Kelly	
New York Yankees	Joe Torre	Won the American League pennant
Oakland Athletics	Art Howe	
Seattle Mariners±	Lou Piniella	
Tampa Bay Devil Rays	Larry Rothschild	Replaced during the season by Hal McRae
Texas Rangers	Johnny Oates	Replaced during the season by Jerry Narron
Toronto Blue Jays	Buck Martinez	

=== National League ===
Team	Manager	Comments
Arizona Diamondbacks	Bob Brenly	Won the World Series
Atlanta Braves	Bobby Cox	
Chicago Cubs	Don Baylor	
Cincinnati Reds	Bob Boone	
Colorado Rockies	Buddy Bell	
Florida Marlins	John Boles Jr.	Replaced during the season by Tony Pérez
Houston Astros	Larry Dierker	
Los Angeles Dodgers	Jim Tracy	
Milwaukee Brewers	Davey Lopes	
Montreal Expos	Felipe Alou	Replaced during the season by Jeff Torborg
New York Mets	Bobby Valentine	
Philadelphia Phillies	Larry Bowa	
Pittsburgh Pirates	Lloyd McClendon	
St. Louis Cardinals	Tony La Russa	
San Diego Padres	Bruce Bochy	
San Francisco Giants	Dusty Baker	

±hosted the MLB All Star Game

== Milestones ==
=== Batters ===
- Barry Bonds (SF):
  - Became the 17th player in Major League history to hit 500 home runs in the eighth inning against the Los Angeles Dodgers on April 17.
- Rickey Henderson (SD):
  - Became the 25th member of the 3,000-hit club with a double in the first inning against the San Diego Padres on October 7.

=== Pitchers ===
- Randy Johnson (AZ):
  - Tied a modern National League record (when including extra inning games) for most strikeouts in a single game, throwing 20 strikeouts in 9 innings in an 11-inning game in a 4–3 win against the Cincinnati Reds on May 8.

=== Miscellaneous ===
- Cleveland Indians:
  - Tied a major league record by becoming the third team to overcome a 12-run deficit on August 5, the largest deficit ever overcome to win. The Indians were in a 12-run deficit twice, 12–0 after the third inning, and 14–2 after the fifth inning. The Indians would go on to win the game 15–14 in extra innings, following a walk-off in the bottom of the 11th in a win over the Seattle Mariners.
- Detroit Tigers:
  - Tied a modern (1900–present) major league record set in 1978 for most runs scored in the ninth inning, by scoring 13 runs against the Texas Rangers on August 8.

== Awards ==
Baseball Writers' Association of America Awards
BBWAA Award	National League	American League
Rookie of the Year	Albert Pujols (STL)	Ichiro Suzuki (SEA)
Cy Young Award	Randy Johnson (AZ)	Roger Clemens (NYY)
Manager of the Year	Larry Bowa (PHI)	Lou Piniella (SEA)
Most Valuable Player	Barry Bonds (SF)	Ichiro Suzuki (SEA)
Gold Glove Awards
Position	National League	American League
Pitcher	Greg Maddux (ATL)	Mike Mussina (NYY)
Catcher	Brad Ausmus (HOU)	Iván Rodríguez (TEX)
1st Base	Todd Helton (COL)	Doug Mientkiewicz (MIN)
2nd Base	Fernando Viña (STL)	Roberto Alomar (CLE)
3rd Base	Scott Rolen (PHI)	Eric Chavez (OAK)
Shortstop	Orlando Cabrera (MON)	Omar Vizquel (CLE)
Outfield	Jim Edmonds (STL); Andruw Jones (ATL); Larry Walker (COL)	Mike Cameron (SEA); Torii Hunter (MIN); Ichiro Suzuki (SEA)
Silver Slugger Awards
Position	National League	American League
Pitcher/Designated Hitter	Mike Hampton (COL)	Edgar Martínez (SEA)
Catcher	Mike Piazza (NYM)	Jorge Posada (NYY)
1st Base	Todd Helton (COL)	Jason Giambi (OAK)
2nd Base	Jeff Kent (SF)	Bret Boone (SEA)
3rd Base	Albert Pujols (STL)	Troy Glaus (ANA)
Shortstop	Rich Aurilia (SF)	Alex Rodriguez (TEX)
Outfield	Barry Bonds (SF); Luis Gonzalez (AZ); Sammy Sosa (CHC)	Juan González (CLE); Manny Ramirez (BOS); Ichiro Suzuki (SEA)

=== Other awards ===
- Outstanding Designated Hitter Award: Edgar Martínez (SEA)
- Hank Aaron Award: Alex Rodriguez (TEX, American); Barry Bonds (SF, National).
- Roberto Clemente Award (Humanitarian):
  - Curt Schilling (AZ)
  - Residents of New York City, for their relief efforts following the September 11 terrorist attacks.
- Rolaids Relief Man Award: Mariano Rivera (NYY, American); Armando Benítez (NYM, National).
- Warren Spahn Award (Best left-handed pitcher): Randy Johnson (AZ)

=== Player of the Month ===
Month	American League	National League
April	Manny Ramirez	Luis Gonzalez
May	Jason Giambi	Barry Bonds
June	Mike Sweeney	Luis Gonzalez
July	Jim Thome	Jeff Bagwell
August	Jermaine Dye	Sammy Sosa
September	Eric Chavez	Barry Bonds

=== Pitcher of the Month ===
Month	American League	National League
April	Brad Radke	Wade Miller
May	Pedro Martínez	Curt Schilling
June	Roger Clemens	Greg Maddux
July	Mark Mulder	Greg Maddux
August	Barry Zito	Javier Vázquez
September	Barry Zito	Woody Williams

=== Rookie of the Month ===
Month	American League	National League
April	Ichiro Suzuki	Albert Pujols
May	Ichiro Suzuki	Albert Pujols
June	Ichiro Suzuki	Ben Sheets
July	CC Sabathia	Pedro Feliz
August	Ichiro Suzuki	Roy Oswalt
September	Ichiro Suzuki	Bud Smith

== Home field attendance and payroll ==
Team name	Wins	%±	Home attendance	%±	Per game	Est. payroll	%±
Seattle Mariners	116	27.5%	3,507,326	20.3%	43,300	$74,720,834	23.5%
San Francisco Giants	90	−7.2%	3,311,958	−0.2%	40,888	$63,280,167	17.8%
New York Yankees	95	9.2%	3,264,907	6.9%	40,811	$112,787,143	21.1%
Cleveland Indians	91	1.1%	3,175,523	−8.1%	39,694	$93,360,001	21.3%
Colorado Rockies	73	−11.0%	3,166,821	−3.9%	39,097	$71,541,334	17.1%
St. Louis Cardinals	93	−2.1%	3,109,578	−6.8%	37,922	$79,373,333	28.7%
Baltimore Orioles	63	−14.9%	3,094,841	−6.1%	38,686	$74,279,540	−9.8%
Los Angeles Dodgers	86	0.0%	3,017,143	4.8%	37,249	$109,105,953	23.8%
Houston Astros	93	29.2%	2,904,277	−5.0%	35,855	$60,612,667	18.2%
Texas Rangers	73	2.8%	2,831,021	9.4%	34,525	$88,633,500	25.2%
Atlanta Braves	88	−7.4%	2,823,530	−12.7%	34,858	$91,936,166	8.5%
Milwaukee Brewers	68	−6.8%	2,811,041	78.6%	34,704	$43,886,833	17.6%
Chicago Cubs	88	35.4%	2,779,465	−0.4%	34,314	$64,715,833	6.9%
Arizona Diamondbacks	92	8.2%	2,736,451	−7.0%	33,783	$85,082,999	5.0%
New York Mets	82	−12.8%	2,658,330	−5.8%	32,819	$93,174,428	17.2%
Boston Red Sox	82	−3.5%	2,625,333	1.5%	32,412	$110,035,833	37.6%
Pittsburgh Pirates	62	−10.1%	2,464,870	40.9%	30,430	$57,760,833	84.4%
San Diego Padres	79	3.9%	2,378,128	1.1%	29,360	$39,182,833	−28.8%
Oakland Athletics	102	12.1%	2,133,277	33.0%	26,337	$33,810,750	1.9%
Anaheim Angels	75	−8.5%	2,000,919	−3.2%	24,703	$47,735,167	−9.4%
Detroit Tigers	66	−16.5%	1,921,305	−21.2%	23,720	$53,416,167	−10.4%
Toronto Blue Jays	80	−3.6%	1,915,438	12.3%	23,359	$76,895,999	67.0%
Cincinnati Reds	66	−22.4%	1,879,757	−27.1%	23,207	$48,986,000	4.5%
Minnesota Twins	85	23.2%	1,782,929	78.2%	22,011	$24,130,000	37.7%
Philadelphia Phillies	86	32.3%	1,782,054	10.5%	22,001	$41,663,833	−12.3%
Chicago White Sox	83	−12.6%	1,766,172	−9.3%	21,805	$65,653,667	106.8%
Kansas City Royals	65	−15.6%	1,536,371	−1.8%	18,968	$35,422,500	42.2%
Tampa Bay Devil Rays	62	−10.1%	1,298,365	−10.4%	16,029	$56,980,000	−9.9%
Florida Marlins	76	−3.8%	1,261,226	3.5%	15,765	$35,762,500	75.8%
Montreal Expos	68	1.5%	642,745	−30.6%	7,935	$35,159,500	6.6%

== Television coverage ==
This was the first season that national television coverage was split between ESPN and Fox Sports. ESPN and ESPN2 aired selected weeknight and Sunday night games, and selected Division Series playoff games. Fox televised Saturday baseball, the All-Star Game, selected Division Series games, both League Championship Series, and the World Series. Sister network FX also aired Saturday primetime games. Thursday night games moved from Fox Sports Net to Fox Family. Fox Family also aired selected Division Series games. This was the last season that Fox Sports broadcast regular season games on either Fox Family or FX.

== See also ==
- 2001 Nippon Professional Baseball season
