= 2001 Anaheim Angels season =

Major League Baseball season

2001 Anaheim Angels
- League: American League
- Division: West
- Ballpark: Edison International Field of Anaheim
- City: Anaheim, California
- Record: 75–87 (.463)
- Divisional place: 3rd
- Owner: The Walt Disney Company
- General manager: Bill Stoneman
- Manager: Mike Scioscia
- Television: Fox Sports Net West; KCAL-9 •Rex Hudler, Steve Physioc
- Radio: KLAC (AM 570) •Mario Impemba, Daron Sutton; KTNQ (AM 1020—Spanish) •José Tolentino, Ivan Lara
- Stats: ESPN.com; Baseball Reference

The 2001 Anaheim Angels season was the 41st season of the Los Angeles Angels franchise in the American League, the 36th in Anaheim, and their 36th season playing their home games at Edison International Field of Anaheim. The Angels finished third in the American League West with a record of 75 wins and 87 losses.

== Offseason ==
- December 7, 2000: Tim Belcher was signed as a free agent with the Anaheim Angels.
- December 21, 2000: Aaron Small was signed as a free agent with the Anaheim Angels.
- January 16, 2001: José Canseco signed as a free agent with the Anaheim Angels.
- March 25, 2001: Tim Belcher retired during spring training.
- March 28, 2001: José Canseco was released by the Anaheim Angels.
- March 28, 2001: Glenallen Hill was traded by the New York Yankees to the Anaheim Angels for Darren Blakely (minors).

== Regular season ==
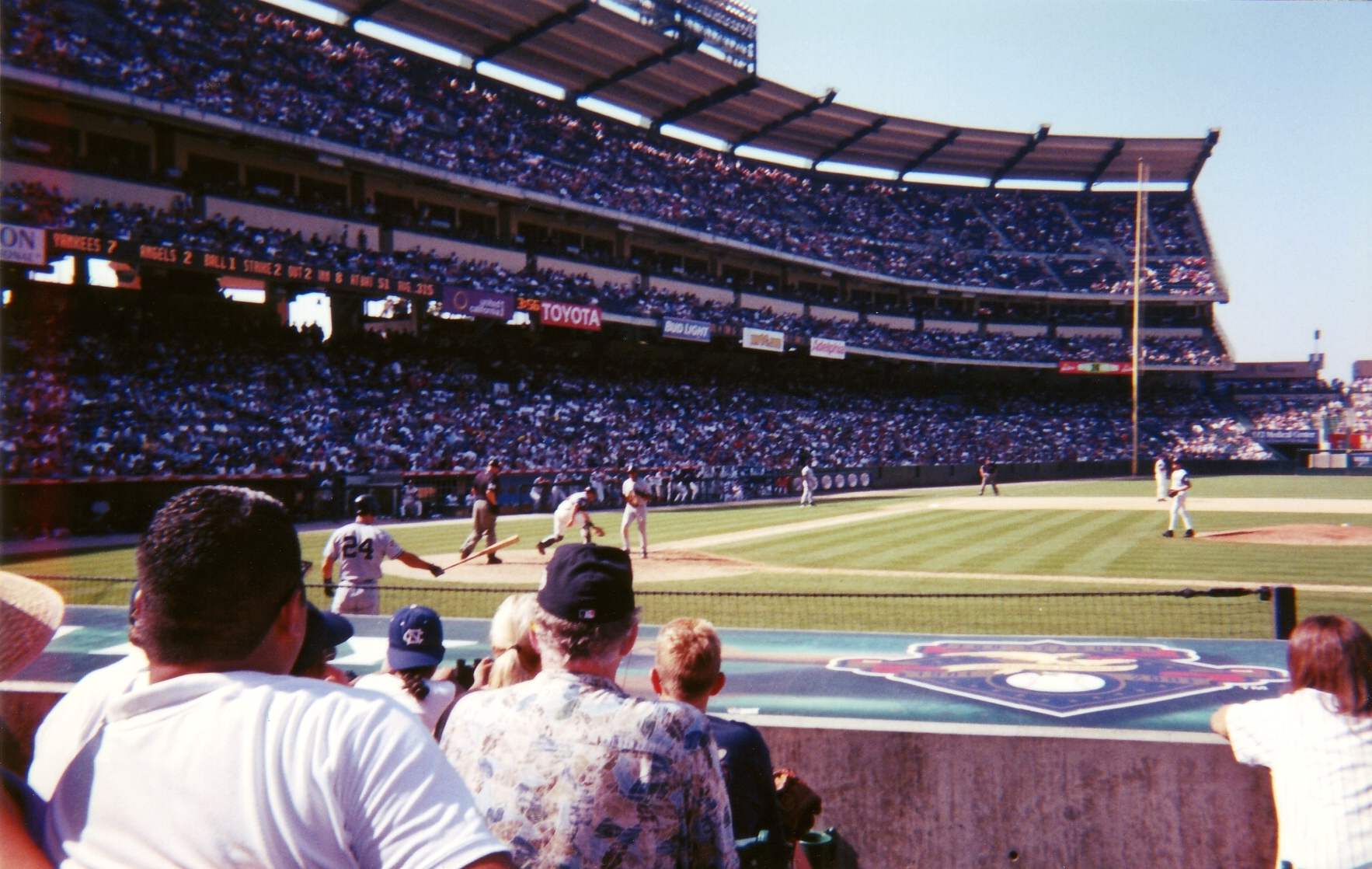
The Angels hosting a home game against the season's eventual American League Champions New York Yankees in August 2001.

=== Season standings ===
AL West
Team	W	L	Pct.	GB	Home	Road
Seattle Mariners	116	46	.716	—	57‍–‍24	59‍–‍22
Oakland Athletics	102	60	.630	14	53‍–‍28	49‍–‍32
Anaheim Angels	75	87	.463	41	39‍–‍42	36‍–‍45
Texas Rangers	73	89	.451	43	41‍–‍41	32‍–‍48

=== Record vs. opponents ===
2001 American League record Source: MLB Standings Grid – 2001
Team	ANA	BAL	BOS	CWS	CLE	DET	KC	MIN	NYY	OAK	SEA	TB	TEX	TOR	NL
Anaheim	—	4–5	4–3	6–3	5–4	5–4	5–4	3–6	4–3	6–14	4–15	7–2	7–12	5–4	10–8
Baltimore	5–4	—	9–10	3–4	1–5	4–2	5–2	3–3	5–13–1	2–7	1–8	10–9	2–7	7–12	6–12
Boston	3–4	10–9	—	3–3	3–6	4–5	3–3	3–3	5–13	4–5	3–6	14–5	5–2	12–7	10–8
Chicago	3–6	4–3	3–3	—	10–9	13–6	14–5	5–14	1–5	1–8	2–7	5–2	7–2	3–3	12–6
Cleveland	4–5	5–1	6–3	9–10	—	13–6	11–8	14–5	4–5	4–3	2–5	5–1	5–4	2–4	7–11
Detroit	4–5	2–4	5–4	6–13	6–13	—	8–11	4–15	4–5	1–6	2–5	4–2	8–1	2–4	10–8
Kansas City	4–5	2–5	3–3	5–14	8–11	11–8	—	6–13	0–6	3–6	3–6	4–2	4–5	4–3	8–10
Minnesota	6–3	3–3	3–3	14–5	5–14	15–4	13–6	—	4–2	5–4	1–8	1–6	4–5	2–5	9–9
New York	3–4	13–5–1	13–5	5–1	5–4	5–4	6–0	2–4	—	3–6	3–6	13–6	3–4	11–8	10–8
Oakland	14–6	7–2	5–4	8–1	3–4	6–1	6–3	4–5	6–3	—	9–10	7–2	9–10	6–3	12–6
Seattle	15–4	8–1	6–3	7–2	5–2	5–2	6–3	8–1	6–3	10–9	—	7–2	15–5	6–3	12–6
Tampa Bay	2–7	9–10	5–14	2–5	1–5	2–4	2–4	6–1	6–13	2–7	2–7	—	4–5	9–10	10–8
Texas	12–7	7–2	2–5	2–7	4–5	1–8	5–4	5–4	4–3	10–9	5–15	5–4	—	3–6	8–10
Toronto	4–5	12–7	7–12	3–3	4–2	4–2	3–4	5–2	8–11	3–6	3–6	10–9	6–3	—	8–10

=== Notable transactions ===
- May 4, 2001: Aaron Small was released by the Anaheim Angels.
- June 1, 2001: Glenallen Hill was released by the Anaheim Angels.
- July 13, 2001: Chone Figgins was traded by the Colorado Rockies to the Anaheim Angels for Kimera Bartee.

=== Roster ===
2001 Anaheim Angels
Roster
Pitchers: 39,46 Toby Borland; 45 Brian Cooper; 33 Steve Green; 21 Shigetoshi Hasegawa; 65 Mike Holtz; 43 Al Levine; 47 Mark Lukasiewicz; 52 Bart Miadich; 36 Ramón Ortiz; 40 Troy Percival; 58 Lou Pote; 34 Pat Rapp; 60 Scott Schoeneweis; 62 Scot Shields; 59 Ismael Valdez; 56 Jarrod Washburn; 77 Ben Weber; 32 Matt Wise	Catchers: 19 Jamie Burke; 6 Jorge Fábregas; 1 Bengie Molina; 28 José Molina; 44 Shawn Wooten; Infielders: 37 Larry Barnes; 22 David Eckstein; 39 José Fernández; 10 Benji Gil; 25 Troy Glaus; 5 Wally Joyner; 2 Adam Kennedy; 8 José Nieves; 23 Scott Spiezio	Outfielders: 16 Garret Anderson; 55 Jeff DaVanon; 17 Darin Erstad; 3 Orlando Palmeiro; 15 Tim Salmon; Other batters: 31 Glenallen Hill	Manager: 14 Mike Scioscia; Coaches: 24 Bud Black (Pitching); 4 Alfredo Griffin (First Base); 7 Mickey Hatcher (Hitting); 70 Joe Maddon (Bench); 13 Bobby Ramos (Bullpen); 12 Ron Roenicke (Third Base)

== Player stats ==
=== Batting ===
==== Starters by position ====
Note: Pos = Position; G = Games played; AB = At bats; H = Hits; Avg. = Batting average; HR = Home runs; RBI = Runs batted in

Pos	Player	G	AB	H	Avg.	HR	RBI
C	Bengie Molina	96	325	85	.262	6	40
1B	Scott Spiezio	139	457	124	.271	13	54
2B	Adam Kennedy	137	478	129	.270	6	40
SS	David Eckstein	153	582	166	.285	4	41
3B	Troy Glaus	161	588	147	.250	41	108
LF	Garret Anderson	161	672	194	.289	28	123
CF	Darin Erstad	157	631	163	.258	9	63
RF	Tim Salmon	137	475	108	.227	17	49
DH	Orlando Palmeiro	104	230	56	.243	2	23

==== Other batters ====
Note: G = Games played; AB = At bats; H = Hits; Avg. = Batting average; HR = Home runs; RBI = Runs batted in

Player	G	AB	H	Avg.	HR	RBI
Benji Gil	104	260	77	.296	8	39
Shawn Wooten	79	221	69	.312	8	32
Wally Joyner	53	148	36	.243	3	14
Jorge Fábregas	53	148	33	.223	2	16
Jeff DaVanon	40	88	17	.193	5	9
Glenallen Hill	16	66	9	.136	1	2
José Nieves	29	53	13	.245	2	3
Larry Barnes	16	40	4	.100	1	2
José Molina	15	37	10	.270	2	4
José Fernández	13	25	2	.080	0	0
Jamie Burke	9	5	1	.200	0	0

=== Pitching ===
==== Starting pitchers ====
Note: G = Games pitched; IP = Innings pitched; W = Wins; L = Losses; ERA = Earned run average; SO = Strikeouts

Player	G	IP	W	L	ERA	SO
Ramón Ortiz	32	208.2	13	11	4.36	135
Scott Schoeneweis	32	205.1	10	11	5.08	104
Jarrod Washburn	30	193.1	11	10	3.77	126
Pat Rapp	31	170.0	5	12	4.76	82
Ismael Valdez	27	163.2	9	13	4.45	100
Matt Wise	11	49.1	1	4	4.38	50
Steve Green	1	6.0	0	0	3.00	4

==== Other pitchers ====
Note: G = Games pitched; IP = Innings pitched; W = Wins; L = Losses; ERA = Earned run average; SO = Strikeouts

Player	G	IP	W	L	ERA	SO
Brian Cooper	7	13.2	0	1	2.63	7

==== Relief pitchers ====
Note: G = Games pitched; W = Wins; L = Losses; SV = Saves; ERA = Earned run average; SO = Strikeouts

Player	G	W	L	SV	ERA	SO
Troy Percival	57	4	2	39	2.65	71
Al Levine	64	8	10	2	2.38	40
Mike Holtz	63	1	2	0	4.86	38
Ben Weber	56	6	2	0	3.42	40
Shigetoshi Hasegawa	46	5	6	0	4.04	41
Lou Pote	44	2	0	2	4.15	66
Mark Lukasiewicz	24	0	2	0	6.04	25
Bart Miadich	11	0	0	0	4.50	11
Scot Shields	8	0	0	0	0.00	7
Toby Borland	2	0	1	0	10.80	0

== Farm system ==
Level	Team	League	Manager
AAA	Salt Lake Stingers	Pacific Coast League	Garry Templeton
AA	Arkansas Travelers	Texas League	Mike Brumley
A	Rancho Cucamonga Quakes	California League	Tim Wallach
A	Cedar Rapids Kernels	Midwest League	Tyrone Boykin
Rookie	AZL Angels	Arizona League	Brian Harper
Rookie	Provo Angels	Pioneer League	Tom Kotchman

LEAGUE CHAMPIONS: Arkansas

Records
Preceded by 2000	Anaheim Angels seasons 2001	Succeeded by 2002
