= 2002 Anaheim Angels season =

Major League Baseball season

2002 Anaheim Angels
- World Series champions American League champions American League Wild Card winners
- League: American League
- Division: West
- Ballpark: Edison International Field of Anaheim
- City: Anaheim, California
- Record: 99–63 (.611)
- Divisional place: 2nd
- Owner: The Walt Disney Company
- General manager: Bill Stoneman
- Manager: Mike Scioscia
- Television: KCAL-9; Fox Sports Net West •Steve Physioc, Rex Hudler
- Radio: KLAC (AM 570—Primary); KPLS (AM 830—Backup) •Rory Markas, Terry Smith; KTNQ (AM 1020—Spanish) •Ivan Lara, José Mota
- Stats: ESPN.com; Baseball Reference

The 2002 Anaheim Angels season was the franchise's 42nd, and it ended with the team's first American League pennant and World Series championship.

The Angels finished the regular season with a record of 99–63, 4 games behind the Oakland Athletics in the American League West standings, but qualified for the franchise's first ever wild card playoff berth to return to the postseason for the first time since 1986. Outfielder Garret Anderson led the team with 123 runs batted in and a .539 slugging percentage, was selected for the AL All-Star team, and won the Silver Slugger Award. Jarrod Washburn went 18–6 with a 3.15 earned run average to anchor a pitching staff that allowed the fewest runs in the league.

In the postseason, the Angels defeated the New York Yankees 3–1 in the ALDS, then defeated the Minnesota Twins 4–1 in the ALCS to win the AL pennant. The Angels then won the World Series in dramatic fashion when, with a 3–2 series deficit to the San Francisco Giants, they overcame a 5 run deficit in the late innings of Game 6 to force a winner-take-all Game 7, which they won to clinch the series 4–3. The morning after the win, The Orange County Register celebrated the Angels' win with the headline "7th Heaven," referring to the popular television series and fact that it took seven games for the Angels to win the World Series, and in doing so, it sent them to seventh heaven. Another highlight came in Game 2 when the Angels did not strike out at all, becoming the first team since both the 1960 Pirates and 1960 Yankees to avoid striking out in a postseason game (both teams avoided striking out in Game 7 of the 1960 World Series). This feat wouldn't be repeated until the 2024 Mets did so in Game 5 of the 2024 NLCS against the Dodgers.

2002 was also notable as the season in which the Angels debuted their present-day uniforms, colors, and halo insignia, which replaced the widely ridiculed "periwinkle" uniforms and "winged" insignia they had worn since 1997. It was also the last season the team was owned by The Walt Disney Company, which sold its controlling interest in the team to present-day owner Arte Moreno in 2003.

== Off season ==
The Anaheim Angels focus in the off season leading up to the 2002 season was on how to improve the Angels from the 2001 season when they finished 41 games behind the Seattle Mariners (who won a Major League Baseball record 116 games) in the AL West.

=== Off season transactions ===
- January 4, 2002: Aaron Sele was signed as a free agent with the Anaheim Angels.
- January 31, 2002: Donne Wall was signed as a free agent with the Anaheim Angels.
- February 4, 2002: Erick Aybar was signed as a free agent with the Anaheim Angels.
- February 7, 2002: Clay Bellinger was signed as a free agent with the Anaheim Angels.

== Spring training ==
The Anaheim Angels' 2002 spring training took place at Tempe Diablo Stadium in Tempe, Arizona. The Angels spring training record was 17–15.

=== Spring training transactions ===
- March 16, 2002: Julio Ramirez was signed as a free agent with the Anaheim Angels.

== Standings ==
=== Season standings ===
AL West
Team	W	L	Pct.	GB	Home	Road
Oakland Athletics	103	59	.636	—	54‍–‍27	49‍–‍32
Anaheim Angels	99	63	.611	4	54‍–‍27	45‍–‍36
Seattle Mariners	93	69	.574	10	48‍–‍33	45‍–‍36
Texas Rangers	72	90	.444	31	42‍–‍39	30‍–‍51

=== American League Wild Card ===
Division leaders
Team	W	L	Pct.
New York Yankees	103	58	.640
Minnesota Twins	94	67	.584
Oakland Athletics	103	59	.636

Wild Card team (Top team qualifies for postseason)
Team	W	L	Pct.	GB
Anaheim Angels	99	63	.611	—
Boston Red Sox	93	69	.574	6
Seattle Mariners	93	69	.574	6
Chicago White Sox	81	81	.500	18
Toronto Blue Jays	78	84	.481	21
Cleveland Indians	74	88	.457	25
Texas Rangers	72	90	.444	27
Baltimore Orioles	67	95	.414	32
Kansas City Royals	62	100	.383	37
Detroit Tigers	55	106	.342	43½
Tampa Bay Devil Rays	55	106	.342	43½

== Record vs. opponents ==
	Record			Games Left		
Opponent	Home	Road	Total	Home	Road	Total
AL East
Baltimore Orioles	4–2	3–0	7–2	–	–	–
Boston Red Sox	1–2	2–2	3–4	–	–	–
New York Yankees	2–2	1–2	3–4	–	–	–
Tampa Bay Devil Rays	5–1	3–0	8–1	–	–	–
Toronto Blue Jays	3–0	4–2	7–2	–	–	–
AL Central
Chicago White Sox	3–0	3–3	6–3	–	–	–
Cleveland Indians	3–3	3–0	6–3	–	–	–
Detroit Tigers	5–1	3–0	8–1	–	–	–
Kansas City Royals	3–0	3–3	6–3	–	–	–
Minnesota Twins	3–3	1–2	4–5	–	–	–
AL West
Oakland Athletics	6–5	3–6	9–11	–	–	–
Seattle Mariners	5–5	4–5	9–10	–	–	–
Texas Rangers	7–2	5–5	12–7	–	–	–
National League
Cincinnati Reds	2–1	–	2–1	–	–	–
Los Angeles Dodgers	2–1	1–2	3–3	–	–	–
Milwaukee Brewers	–	3–0	3–0	–	–	–
Pittsburgh Pirates	2–1	–	2–1	–	–	–
St. Louis Cardinals	–	1–2	1–2	–	–	–
Grand Totals	54–27	45–36	99–63	–	–	–

Month	Games	Won	Lost	Pct.
March	1	0	1	.000
April	24	11	13	.458
May	26	19	7	.731
June	29	17	12	.586
July	26	16	10	.615
August	29	18	11	.621
September	27	18	9	.667
Totals	162	99	63	.611

2002 American League record Source: MLB Standings Grid – 2002
Team	ANA	BAL	BOS	CWS	CLE	DET	KC	MIN	NYY	OAK	SEA	TB	TEX	TOR	NL
Anaheim	—	7–2	3–4	6–3	6–3	8–1	6–3	4–5	3–4	9–11	9–10	8–1	12–7	7–2	11–7
Baltimore	2–7	—	6–13	3–4	1–5	2–4	7–0	5–1	6–13	4–5	5–4	10–9	3–6	4–15	9–9
Boston	4–3	13–6	—	2–4	5–4	5–4	4–2	3–3	9–10	6–3	4–5	16–3	4–3	13–6	5–13
Chicago	3–6	4–3	4–2	—	9–10	12–7	11–8	8–11	2–4	2–7	5–4	4–3	5–4	4–2	8–10
Cleveland	3–6	5–1	4–5	10–9	—	10–9	9–10	8–11	3–6	2–5	3–4	4–2	4–5	3–3	6–12
Detroit	1–8	4–2	4–5	7–12	9–10	—	9–10	4–14	1–8	1–6	2–5	2–4	5–4	0–6	6–12
Kansas City	3–6	0–7	2–4	8–11	10–9	10–9	—	5–14	1–5	1–8	3–6	4–2	7–2	3–4	5–13
Minnesota	5–4	1–5	3–3	11–8	11–8	14–4	14–5	—	0–6	3–6	5–4	5–2	6–3	6–1	10–8
New York	4–3	13–6	10–9	4–2	6–3	8–1	5–1	6–0	—	5–4	4–5	13–5	4–3	10–9	11–7
Oakland	11–9	5–4	3–6	7–2	5–2	6–1	8–1	6–3	4–5	—	8–11	8–1	13–6	3–6	16–2
Seattle	10–9	4–5	5–4	4–5	4–3	5–2	6–3	4–5	5–4	11–8	—	5–4	13–7	6–3	11–7
Tampa Bay	1–8	9–10	3–16	3–4	2–4	4–2	2–4	2–5	5–13	1–8	4–5	—	4–5	8–11	7–11
Texas	7–12	6–3	3–4	4–5	5–4	4–5	2–7	3–6	3–4	6–13	7–13	5–4	—	8–1	9–9
Toronto	2–7	15–4	6–13	2–4	3–3	6–0	4–3	1–6	9–10	6–3	3–6	11–8	1–8	—	9–9

== 2002 draft ==
The 2002 Major League Baseball draft was held on June 4–5.

== Regular season ==
=== Game log ===
2002 Game Log: 99–63 (Home: 54–27; Road: 45–36)
March: 0–1 (Home: 0–1)

#	Date	Opponent	Score	Win	Loss	Save	Attendance	Record	Streak
1	March 31	Indians	0–6	Colón (1–0)	**Washburn** (0–1)	—	42,697	0–1	L1

April: 11–13 (Home: 6–8; Road: 5–5)

#	Date	Opponent	Score	Win	Loss	Save	Attendance	Record	Streak
2	April 2	Indians	7–5	**Weber** (1–0)	Riske (0–1)	**Percival** (1)	20,055	1–1	W1
3	April 3	Indians	5–6	Drese (1–0)	**Sele** (0–1)	Wickman (1)	18,194	1–2	L1
4	April 5	@ Rangers	3–1	**Schoeneweis** (1–0)	Valdez (0–1)	**Levine** (1)	49,617	2–2	W1
5	April 6	@ Rangers	6–3	**Ortiz** (1–0)	Irabu (0–1)	**Levine** (2)	35,006	3–2	W2
—	April 7	@ Rangers	**Postponed (rain)** rescheduled for June 24						
6	April 8	Mariners	4–5	Hasegawa (1–0)	**Weber** (1–1)	Sasaki (2)	16,908	3–3	L1
7	April 9	Mariners	1–5	Halama (1–0)	**Appier** (0–1)	—	17,210	3–4	L2
8	April 10	Mariners	1–8	Baldwin (2–0)	**Sele** (0–2)	—	17,784	3–5	L3
9	April 11	Mariners	4–8	García (1–2)	**Schoeneweis** (1–1)	—	18,806	3–6	L4
10	April 12	Athletics	1–5	Hudson (2–0)	**Ortiz** (1–1)	—	31,815	3–7	L5
11	April 13	Athletics	2–7	Hiljus (1–1)	**Washburn** (0–2)	—	33,554	3–8	L6
12	April 14	Athletics	4–1	**Appier** (1–1)	Zito (0–1)	**Levine** (3)	32,881	4–8	W1
13	April 16	Rangers	6–5 (10)	**Levine** (1–0)	Rocker (0–1)	—	15,385	5–8	W2
14	April 17	Rangers	1–4	Valdez (1–2)	**Schoeneweis** (1–2)	Irabu (1)	15,632	5–9	L1
15	April 18	@ Athletics	2–4	Hiljus (2–1)	**Ortiz** (1–2)	Koch (3)	9,145	5–10	L2
16	April 19	@ Athletics	9–7	**Washburn** (1–2)	Fyhrie (0–1)	**Percival** (2)	12,468	6–10	W1
17	April 20	@ Athletics	7–8	Bradford (1–0)	**Levine** (1–1)	Koch (4)	20,253	6–11	L1
18	April 21	@ Athletics	5–6	Venafro (1–0)	**Percival** (0–1)	—	20,088	6–12	L2
19	April 22	@ Mariners	5–16	Moyer (3–1)	**Schoeneweis** (1–3)	—	33,119	6–13	L3
20	April 23	@ Mariners	0–1	Franklin (2–0)	**Ortiz** (1–3)	Sasaki (6)	32,127	6–14	L4
21	April 24	@ Mariners	10–6	**Washburn** (2–2)	Abbott (1–2)	—	37,212	7–14	W1
22	April 26	Blue Jays	4–0	**Appier** (2–1)	Smith (0–1)	**Percival** (3)	25,296	8–14	W2
23	April 27	Blue Jays	11–4	**Sele** (1–2)	Borbón (1–1)	—	29,112	9–14	W3
24	April 28	Blue Jays	8-5 (14)	**Lukasiewicz** (1–0)	Borbón (1–2)	—	25,073	10–14	W4
25	April 30	@ Indians	21–2	**Ortiz** (2–3)	Sabathia (2–3)	—	24,286	11–14	W5

May: 19–7 (Home: 9–3; Road: 10–4)

#	Date	Opponent	Score	Win	Loss	Save	Attendance	Record	Streak
26	May 1	@ Indians	7–2	**Washburn** (3–2)	Drese (2–3)	—	23,536	12–14	W6
27	May 2	@ Indians	8–0	**Appier** (3–1)	Finley (2–3)	—	26,068	13–14	W7
28	May 3	@ Blue Jays	6–4	**Sele** (2–2)	Lyon (1–3)	**Percival** (4)	13,183	14–14	W8
29	May 4	@ Blue Jays	1–4	Miller (2–0)	**Schoeneweis** (1–4)	Escobar (4)	20,558	14–15	L1
30	May 5	@ Blue Jays	8–2	**Ortiz** (3–3)	Prokopec (1–4)	—	24,046	15–15	W1
31	May 7	Tigers	0–3	Greisinger (1–0)	**Weber** (1–2)	Acevedo (3)	15,315	15–16	L1
32	May 8	Tigers	3–2	**Percival** (1–1)	Rodney (0–2)	—	14,722	16–16	W1
33	May 9	Tigers	7–6	**Sele** (3–2)	Redman (0–4)	**Percival** (5)	15,003	17–16	W2
34	May 10	White Sox	19–0	**Schoeneweis** (2–4)	Wright (3–4)		36,715	18–16	W3
35	May 11	White Sox	6–3	**Ortiz** (4–3)	Garland (4–2)	**Percival** (6)	40,535	19–16	W4
36	May 12	White Sox	5–4	**Percival** (2–1)	Foulke (0–2)	—	19,251	20–16	W5
37	May 14	@ Tigers	9–2	**Appier** (4–1)	Cornejo (1–4)	—	12,745	21–16	W6
38	May 15	@ Tigers	10–1	**Sele** (4–2)	Redman (0–5)	—	12,314	22–16	W7
—	May 16	@ Tigers	**Postponed (rain)** rescheduled for August 5						
39	May 17	@ White Sox	8–4	**Schoeneweis** (3–4)	Garland (4–3)	**Levine** (4)	12,736	23–16	W8
40	May 18	@ White Sox	4–10	Glover (0–1)	**Ortiz** (4–4)	—	21,122	23–17	L1
41	May 19	@ White Sox	6–1	**Washburn** (4–2)	Buehrle (7–3)		19,869	24–17	W1
42	May 20	Royals	6–3	**Appier** (5–1)	Stein (0–2)	**Percival** (7)	14,035	25–17	W2
43	May 21	Royals	5–1	**Cook** (1–0)	Reichert (2–5)	—	15,593	26–17	W3
44	May 22	Royals	7–6	**Weber** (2–2)	May (0–2)	**Percival** (8)	16,163	27–17	W4
45	May 24	Twins	1–5	Reed (5–2)	**Ortiz** (4–5)	—	27,494	27–18	L1
46	May 25	Twins	4–3 (13)	**Levine** (2–1)	Cressend (0–1)	—	31,820	28–18	W1
47	May 26	Twins	2–5	Milton (7–3)	**Appier** (5–2)	Guardado (15)	22,854	28–19	L1
48	May 28	@ Royals	4–7	Byrd (8–2)	**Sele** (4–3)	Hernández (8)	11,773	28–20	L2
49	May 29	@ Royals	12–2	**Ortiz** (5–5)	Affeldt (1–2)	—	13,662	29–20	W1
50	May 30	@ Twins	6–7 (10)	Guardado (1–1)	**Pote** (0–1)		14,521	29–21	L1
51	May 31	@ Twins	11–3	**Washburn** (5–2)	Milton (7–4)	—	17,101	30–21	W1

June: 17–12 (Home: 9–4; Road: 8–8)

#	Date	Opponent	Score	Win	Loss	Save	Attendance	Record	Streak
52	June 1	@ Twins	2–4	Lohse (5–3)	**Appier** (5–3)	Guardado (17)	17,480	30–22	L1
53	June 2	@ Twins	5–4	**Sele** (5–3)	Kinney (1–5)	**Percival** (9)	18,657	31–22	W1
54	June 3	Rangers	5–2	**Ortiz** (6–5)	Bell (2–2)	**Percival** (10)	15,619	32–22	W2
55	June 4	Rangers	3–0	**Schoeneweis** (4–4)	Burba (3–3)	**Percival** (11)	16,810	33–22	W3
56	June 5	Rangers	7–5 (10)	**Levine** (3–1)	Irabu (2–5)	—	15,301	34–22	W4
57	June 6	Rangers	8–9	Rogers (7–3)	**Appier** (5–4)	Telford (1)	17,948	34–23	L1
58	June 7	Reds	4–3	**Sele** (6–3)	Reitsma (3–3)	**Percival** (12)	35,341	35–23	W1
59	June 8	Reds	3–4	White (3–1)	**Cook** (1–1)	Graves (19)	29,881	35–24	L1
60	June 9	Reds	7–4	**Schoeneweis** (5–4)	Hamilton (3–4)	**Percival** (13)	35,501	36–24	W1
61	June 10	Pirates	4–3	**Washburn** (6–2)	Anderson (5–8)	**Percival** (14)	16,861	37–24	W2
62	June 11	Pirates	3–7	Fogg (7–4)	**Appier** (5–5)	—	17,755	37–25	L1
63	June 12	Pirates	8–5	**Weber** (3–2)	Boehringer (1–2)	**Percival** (15)	17,096	38–25	W1
64	June 14	@ Dodgers	8–4	**Ortiz** (7–5)	Ishii (10–2)	—	51,722	39–25	W2
65	June 15	@ Dodgers	5–10	Pérez (7–3)	**Schoeneweis** (5–5)	—	52,165	39–26	L1
66	June 16	@ Dodgers	4–5	Carrara (4–2)	**Levine** (3–2)	Gagné (23)	52,183	39–27	L2
67	June 18	@ Cardinals	2–7	Kile (5–4)	**Appier** (5–6)	—	39,386	39–28	L3
68	June 19	@ Cardinals	2–6	Morris (10–4)	**Sele** (6–4)	—	35,432	39–29	L4
69	June 20	@ Cardinals	3–2	**Schoeneweis** (6–5)	Smith (0–5)	**Percival** (16)	36,385	40–29	W1
70	June 21	@ Brewers	11–4	**Ortiz** (8–5)	Quevedo (3–6)	—	20,289	41–29	W2
71	June 22	@ Brewers	8–2	**Washburn** (7–2)	Cabrera (3–5)	—	28,765	42–29	W3
72	June 23	@ Brewers	5–2	**Appier** (6–6)	Sheets (4–8)	**Percival** (17)	23,751	43–29	W4
73	June 24	@ Rangers	5–8	Benoit (2–0)	**Sele** (6–5)	—	0	43–30	L1
74	June 24	@ Rangers	2–3	Burba (4–4)	**Lackey** (0–1)	—	23,103	43–31	L2
75	June 25	@ Rangers	5–11	Valdez (5–6)	**Schoeneweis** (6–6)	—	20,089	43–32	L3
76	June 26	@ Rangers	7–6	**Weber** (4–2)	Irabu (3–7)	**Percival** (18)	29,726	44–32	W1
77	June 27	@ Rangers	6–3	**Washburn** (8–2)	Bell (3–3)	**Percival** (19)	22,077	45–32	W2
78	June 28	Dodgers	5–7	Carrara (5–2)	**Shields** (0–1)	Gagné (29)	43,690	45–33	L1
79	June 29	Dodgers	7–0	**Sele** (7–5)	Ishii (11–4)	—	43,502	46–33	W1
80	June 30	Dodgers	5–1	**Lackey** (1–1)	Pérez (9–4)	**Weber** (1)	43,059	47–33	W2

July: 16–10 (Home: 10–5; Road: 6–5)

#	Date	Opponent	Score	Win	Loss	Save	Attendance	Record	Streak
81	July 2	Orioles	0–3	Lopez (7–3)	**Ortiz** (8–6)	Julio (17)	18,521	47–34	L1
82	July 3	Orioles	1–0	**Washburn** (9–2)	Erickson (3–8)	**Percival** (20)	17,477	48–34	W1
83	July 4	Orioles	2–7	Driskill (6–1)	**Appier** (6–7)	—	43,342	48–35	L1
84	July 5	Devil Rays	6–5 (10)	**Shields** (1–1)	Yan (4–4)	—	23,648	49–35	W1
85	July 6	Devil Rays	4–3	**Schoeneweis** (7–6)	Colome (1–5)	**Percival** (21)	29,513	50–35	W2
86	July 7	Devil Rays	2–1 (10)	**Percival** (3–1)	Harper (3–5)	—	26,446	51–35	W3
**73rd All-Star Game in Milwaukee, Wisconsin**
87	July 11	@ Royals	1–0	**Washburn** (10–2)	May (2–6)	**Percival** (22)	13,031	52–35	W4
88	July 12	@ Royals	11–3	**Appier** (7–7)	Suppan (7–7)	—	24,824	53–35	W5
89	July 13	@ Royals	0–4	Byrd (12–6)	**Sele** (7–6)	—	19,504	53–36	L1
90	July 14	@ Royals	3–12	Asencio (2–2)	**Ortiz** (8–7)	—	12,457	53–37	L2
91	July 15	@ Twins	8–10	Hawkins (4–0)	**Schoeneweis** (7–7)	Guardado (29)	19,189	53–38	L3
92	July 16	@ Twins	4–2	**Washburn** (11–2)	Milton (11–7)	**Weber** (2)	26,258	54–38	W1
93	July 17	@ Athletics	10–4	**Appier** (8–7)	Hudson (7–8)	—	38,547	55–38	W2
94	July 18	@ Athletics	0–2	Zito (13–3)	**Sele** (7–7)	Koch (24)	15,733	55–39	L1
95	July 19	Mariners	15–3	**Ortiz** (9–7)	García (11–6)	—	43,407	56–39	W1
96	July 20	Mariners	7–6	**Shields** (2–1)	Rhodes (5–2)	**Weber** (3)	43,109	57–39	W2
97	July 21	Mariners	7–5	**Washburn** (12–2)	Nelson (1–2)	**Weber** (4)	34,945	58–39	W3
98	July 23	Athletics	1–2	Zito (14–3)	**Appier** (8–8)	Koch (25)	25,370	58–40	L1
99	July 24	Athletics	5–1	**Sele** (8–7)	Hudson (7–9)	—	25,240	59–40	W1
100	July 25	Athletics	5–4	**Shields** (3–1)	Mecir (3–3)	**Weber** (3)	31,653	60–40	W2
101	July 26	@ Mariners	8–0	**Lackey** (2–1)	Baldwin (6–7)	—	45,559	61–40	W3
102	July 27	@ Mariners	1–3	Piñeiro (11–4)	**Washburn** (12–3)	Sasaki (26)	45,974	61–41	L1—
103	July 28	@ Mariners	1–0	**Appier** (9–8)	Sasaki (2–4)	**Percival** (23)	45,634	62–41	W1
104	July 29	Red Sox	5–4	**Schoeneweis** (8–7)	Embree (0–1)	**Percival** (24)	27,929	63–41	W2
105	July 30	Red Sox	0–6	Martínez (14–2)	**Ortiz** (9–8)	—	32,812	63–42	L1
106	July 31	Red Sox	1–2	Wakefield (5–3)	**Lackey** (2–2)	Urbina (25)	28,227	63–43	L2

August: 18–11 (Home: 11–4; Road: 7–7)

#	Date	Opponent	Score	Win	Loss	Save	Attendance	Record	Streak
107	August 1	Yankees	2–1	**Washburn** (13–3)	Weaver (7–10)	**Percival** (25)	42,897	64–43	W1
108	August 2	Yankees	0–4	Pettitte (6–4)	**Appier** (9–9)	Mendoza (3)	43,668	64–44	L1
109	August 3	Yankees	5–4	**Percival** (4–1)	Mendoza (7–3)	—	43,619	65–44	W1
110	August 4	Yankees	5–7 (12)	Stanton (5–1)	**Shields** (3–2)	Mendoza (4)	43,455	65–45	L1
111	August 5	@ Tigers	6–3	**Lackey** (3–2)	Powell (1–2)	**Percival** (26)	18,546	66–45	W1
112	August 6	@ White Sox	11–2	**Washburn** (14–3)	Wright (7–10)	**Levine** (5)	17,706	67–45	W2
113	August 7	@ White Sox	6–7	Osuna (6–2)	**Donnelly** (0–1)	—	14,253	67–46	L1
114	August 8	@ White Sox	2–3	Parque (1–1)	**Sele** (8–8)	Marte (5)	18,165	67–47	L2
115	August 9	@ Blue Jays	4–5	Walker (5–2)	**Ortiz** (9–9)	Escobar (23)	18,728	67–48	L3
116	August 10	@ Blue Jays	11–4	**Lackey** (4–2)	Parris (5–3)	—	25,118	68–48	W1
117	August 11	@ Blue Jays	1–0	**Washburn** (15–3)	Halladay (14–5)	**Percival** (27)	34,013	69–48	W2
118	August 12	Tigers	7–0	**Appier** (10–9)	Redman (7–10)	—	19,709	70–48	W3
119	August 13	Tigers	7–6 (12)	**Levine** (4–2)	Bernero (2–7)		19,694	71–48	W4
120	August 14	Tigers	5–4	**Ortiz** (10–9)	Maroth (4–5)	**Percival** (28)	23,391	72–48	W5
121	August 16	Indians	5–4	**Lackey** (5–2)	Drese (9–9)	**Percival** (29)	41,356	73–48	W6
122	August 17	Indians	4–9	Sadler (1–0)	**Washburn** (15–4)	—	39,866	73–49	L1
123	August 18	Indians	4–1	**Appier** (11–9)	Sabathia (8–10)	**Percival** (30)	41,059	74–49	W1
124	August 20	@ Yankees	5–7	Pettitte (8–4)	**Sele** (8–9)	Stanton (2)	41,619	74–50	L1
125	August 21	@ Yankees	5–1 (11)	**Weber** (5–2)	Weaver (7–11)	—	46,423	75-50	W1
126	August 22	@ Yankees	2–4	Wells (14–6)	**Lackey** (5–3)	Karsay (6)	43,222	75–51	L1
127	August 23	@ Red Sox	1–4	Martínez (17–3)	**Washburn** (15–5)	Urbina (30)	33,221	75–52	L2
128	August 24	@ Red Sox	2–0	**Appier** (12–9)	Wakefield (7–5)	**Percival** (31)	32,510	76–52	W1
129	August 25	@ Red Sox	8–3	**Schoeneweis** (9–7)	Lowe (17–6)	—	32,059	77–52	W2
130	August 26	@ Red Sox	9–10 (10)	Urbina (1–6)	**Shields** (3–3)	—	32,869	77–53	L1
131	August 27	Devil Rays	7–3	**Lackey** (6–3)	Zambrano (5–6)	**Weber** (4)	19,869	78–53	W1
132	August 28	Devil Rays	5–8 (10)	Yan (6–7)	**Levine** (4–3)	—	17,740	78–54	L1
133	August 29	Devil Rays	6–1	**Appier** (13–9)	Sturtze (3–14)	—	18,820	79–54	W1
134	August 30	Orioles	6–2	**Callaway** (1–0)	Johnson (4–11)	**Schoeneweis** (1)	29,959	80–54	W2
135	August 31	Orioles	9–0	**Ortiz** (11–9)	Erickson (5–12)	—	38,563	81–54	W3

September: 18–9 (Home: 9–2; Road: 9–7)

#	Date	Opponent	Score	Win	Loss	Save	Attendance	Record	Streak
136	September 1	Orioles	9–3	**Lackey** (7–3)	Lopez (14–7)	**Percival** (32)	24,592	82–54	W4
137	September 3	@ Devil Rays	10–2	**Washburn** (16–5)	Sosa (1–7)	—	10,146	83–54	W5
138	September 4	@ Devil Rays	4–2	**Appier** (14–9)	Sturtze (3–15)	**Percival** (33)	10,161	84–54	W6
139	September 5	@ Devil Rays	10–1	**Ortiz** (12–9)	Kennedy (7–10)	—	10,135	85–54	W7
140	September 6	@ Orioles	6–3	**Lackey** (8–3)	Douglass (0–2)	**Percival** (34)	24,045	86–54	W8
141	September 7	@ Orioles	4–2 (10)	**Weber** (6–2)	Julio (5–6)	**Percival** (35)	30,714	87–54	W9
142	September 8	@ Orioles	6–2	**Washburn** (17–5)	Hentgen (0–1)	**Weber** (5)	27,665	88–54	W10
143	September 9	Athletics	1–2	Hudson (13–9)	**Appier** (14–10)	Koch (39)	28,145	89–54	L1
144	September 10	Athletics	5–2	**Ortiz** (13–9)	Lilly (4–7)	**Percival** (36)	35,323	89–55	W1
145	September 11	Athletics	6–5	**Shields** (4–3)	Tam (0–1)	**Percival** (37)	34,302	90–55	W2
146	September 12	Athletics	7–6	**Donnelly** (1–1)	Koch (9–3)	—	31,304	91–55	W3
147	September 13	Rangers	3–2	**Washburn** (18–5)	Benoit (3–4)	**Percival** (38)	35,345	92–55	W4
148	September 14	Rangers	8–6	**Shields** (5–3)	Van Poppel (3–2)	**Percival** (39)	39,909	93–55	W5
149	September 15	Rangers	13–4	**Ortiz** (14–9)	Rogers (13–8)	—	33,445	94–55	W6
150	September 16	@ Athletics	3–4	Koch (10–3)	**Levine** (4–3)	—	22,326	94–56	L1
151	September 17	@ Athletics	1–0 (10)	**Weber** (7–2)	Koch (10–4)	**Percival** (40)	25,894	95–56	W1
152	September 18	@ Athletics	4–7	Zito (22–5)	**Callaway** (1–1)	Koch (40)	50,734	95–57	L1
153	September 19	@ Athletics	3–5	Hudson (15–9)	**Appier** (14–11)	Koch (41)	27,435	95–58	L2
154	September 20	@ Mariners	8–1	**Ortiz** (15–9)	Piñeiro (14–7)	—	45,663	96–58	W1
155	September 21	@ Mariners	4–6	García (16–10)	**Lackey** (8–4)	Sasaki (36)	45,784	96–59	L1
156	September 22	@ Mariners	2–3	Franklin (7–4)	**Washburn** (18–6)	Nelson (2)	45,693	96–60	L2
157	September 24	@ Rangers	1–2	Benoit (4–4)	**Appier** (14–12)	Cordero (9)	21,869	96–61	L3
158	September 25	@ Rangers	3–4	Seánez (1–3)	**Schoeneweis** (9–8)	Cordero (10)	20,976	96–62	L4
159	September 26	@ Rangers	10–5	**Lackey** (9–4)	Lewis (1–3)	—	21,774	97–62	W1
160	September 27	Mariners	6–7 (12)	Halama (6–5)	**Pote** (0–2)	—	43,452	97–63	L1
161	September 28	Mariners	8–4	**Callaway** (2–1)	Franklin (7–5)	—	43,202	98–63	W1
162	September 29	Mariners	7–6	**Lukasiewicz** (2–0)	Valdez (8–12)	**Donnelly** (1)	42,878	99–63	W2

Legend: = Win = Loss = Postponement
Bold = Angels team member

== Roster ==
2002 Anaheim Angels
Roster
Pitchers: 27 Kevin Appier; 51 Mickey Callaway; 21 Dennis Cook; 53 Brendan Donnelly; 41 John Lackey; 43 Al Levine; 47 Mark Lukasiewicz; 36 Ramón Ortiz; 40 Troy Percival; 58 Lou Pote; 57 Francisco Rodríguez; 60 Scott Schoeneweis; 34 Aaron Sele; 62 Scot Shields; 18 Donne Wall; 56 Jarrod Washburn; 77 Ben Weber; 32 Matt Wise	Catchers: 6 Jorge Fábregas; 9 Sal Fasano; 1 Bengie Molina; 28 José Molina; Infielders: 5 Alfredo Amezaga; 35 Clay Bellinger; 22 David Eckstein; 6 Chone Figgins; 20 Brad Fullmer; 10 Benji Gil; 25 Troy Glaus; 2 Adam Kennedy; 8 José Nieves; 23 Scott Spiezio; 44 Shawn Wooten	Outfielders: 16 Garret Anderson; 33 Jeff DaVanon; 17 Darin Erstad; 18 Alex Ochoa; 3 Orlando Palmeiro; 39 Julio Ramírez; 15 Tim Salmon	Manager: 14 Mike Scioscia; Coaches: 24 Bud Black (pitching); 4 Alfredo Griffin (first base); 7 Mickey Hatcher (hitting); 70 Joe Maddon (bench); 13 Bobby Ramos (bullpen); 12 Ron Roenicke (third base)

=== Regular season transactions ===
- July 31, 2002: Alex Ochoa was traded by the Milwaukee Brewers with Sal Fasano to the Anaheim Angels for players to be named later and Jorge Fábregas. The Anaheim Angels sent Johnny Raburn (minors) (August 14, 2002) and Pedro Liriano (September 20, 2002) to the Milwaukee Brewers to complete the trade.

== Player stats ==
=== Batting ===
==== Starters by position ====
Note: Pos. = Position; G = Games played; AB = At bats; H = Hits; Avg. = Batting average; HR = Home runs; RBI = Runs batted in

Player	Pos	G	AB	H	Avg.	HR	RBI
Garret Anderson	LF	158	638	195	.306	29	123
David Eckstein	SS	152	608	178	.293	8	63
Darin Erstad	CF	150	625	177	.283	10	73
Brad Fullmer	DH	130	429	124	.289	19	59
Troy Glaus	3B	156	569	142	.250	30	111
Adam Kennedy	2B	144	474	148	.312	7	52
Bengie Molina	C	122	428	105	.245	5	47
Tim Salmon	RF	138	483	138	.286	22	88
Scott Spiezio	1B	153	491	140	.285	12	82

==== Other batters ====
Note: Pos = Position; G = Games played; AB = At bats; H = Hits; Avg. = Batting average; HR = Home runs; RBI = Runs batted in

Player	Pos	G	AB	H	Avg.	HR	RBI
Jorge Fábregas	C	35	88	17	.193	0	8
José Molina	C	29	70	19	.271	0	5
Shawn Wooten	1B/DH	49	113	33	.292	3	19
Julio Ramirez	CF/RF	29	32	9	.281	1	7
Orlando Palmeiro	LF/RF	110	263	79	.300	0	31
Alex Ochoa	RF	37	65	18	.277	2	10
Jeff DaVanon	OF	16	30	5	.167	1	4
José Nieves	2B/3B	45	97	28	.289	0	6
Benji Gil	1B/2B/SS	61	130	37	.285	3	20
Chone Figgins	2B	15	12	2	.167	0	1
Alfredo Amézaga	SS	12	13	7	.538	0	2
Clay Bellinger	1B	2	1	0	.000	0	0
Sal Fasano	C	2	1	0	.000	0	0

=== Pitching ===
==== Starting pitchers ====
Note: G = Games pitched; IP = Innings pitched; W = Wins; L = Losses; ERA = Earned run average; SO = Strikeouts

Player	G	IP	W	L	ERA	SO
Ramón Ortiz	32	217.1	15	9	3.77	162
Jarrod Washburn	32	206.0	18	6	3.15	139
Kevin Appier	32	188.1	7	7	3.92	132
Aaron Sele	26	160.0	8	9	4.89	82
John Lackey	18	108.1	9	4	3.66	69
Mickey Callaway	6	34.1	2	1	4.19	23

==== Other pitchers ====
Note: G = Games pitched; IP = Innings pitched; W = Wins; L = Losses; SV = Saves; ERA = Earned run average; SO = Strikeouts

Player	G	IP	W	L	SV	ERA	SO
Scott Schoeneweis	54	118.0	9	8	0	4.88	65

===== Relief pitchers =====
Note: G = Games pitched; IP = Innings pitched; W = Wins; L = Losses; SV = Saves; ERA = Earned run average; SO = Strikeouts

Player	G	IP	W	L	SV	ERA	SO
Troy Percival	58	56.1	4	1	40	1.92	68
Ben Weber	63	78.0	7	2	7	2.54	43
Al Levine	52	63.2	4	4	5	4.24	40
Lou Pote	31	50.1	0	2	0	3.22	32
Brendan Donnelly	46	49.2	1	1	1	2.17	54
Scot Shields	29	49.0	5	3	0	2.20	30
Dennis Cook	37	24.0	1	1	0	3.38	13
Donne Wall	17	21.0	0	0	0	6.43	13
Mark Lukasiewicz	17	14.0	2	0	0	3.86	15
Matt Wise	7	8.1	0	0	0	3.24	6
Francisco Rodriguez	5	5.2	0	0	0	0.00	13

== Postseason ==
With their 10–5 win over the Texas Rangers on Monday, September 26, 2002, the Angels clinched their first (and only to date as of 2022) Wildcard berth. At this time, the Angels would be in the postseason for the first time since the 1986 season.

=== American League Division Series ===
The 2002 American League Division Series featured the Wild Card winner Anaheim Angels and the AL East champion New York Yankees. The series began on October 1, 2002, with the Angels splitting the first two games at Yankee Stadium. The Angels then proceeded to win the next two games, earning their ticket to the ALCS and winning their first postseason series in franchise history, ending New York's bid for a fifth consecutive World Series appearance.

==== Game One ====
October 1, 2002 at Yankee Stadium (I) in Bronx, NY

Team	1	2	3	4	5	6	7	8	9	R	H	E
Anaheim	0	0	1	0	2	1	0	1	0	**5**	**12**	**0**
**New York**	1	0	0	2	1	0	0	4	X	**8**	**8**	**1**
WP: Steve Karsay (1–0) LP: Ben Weber (0–1) Sv: Mariano Rivera (1); Home runs: ANA: Troy Glaus 2 (2); NYY: Derek Jeter (1), Jason Giambi (1), Rondell White (1), Bernie Williams (1)

==== Game Two ====
October 2, 2002 at Yankee Stadium (I) in Bronx, NY

Team	1	2	3	4	5	6	7	8	9	R	H	E
**Anaheim**	1	2	1	0	0	0	0	3	1	**8**	**17**	**1**
New York	0	0	1	2	0	2	0	0	1	**6**	**12**	**1**
WP: Francisco Rodríguez (1–0) LP: Orlando Hernández (0–1) Sv: Troy Percival (1); Home runs: ANA: Tim Salmon (1), Scott Spiezio (1), Garret Anderson (1), Troy Glaus (3); NYY: Derek Jeter (2), Alfonso Soriano (1)

==== Game Three ====
October 4, 2002 at Edison International Field of Anaheim in Anaheim, CA

Team	1	2	3	4	5	6	7	8	9	R	H	E
New York	3	0	3	0	0	0	0	0	0	**6**	**6**	**0**
**Anaheim**	0	1	2	1	0	1	1	3	X	**9**	**12**	**0**
WP: Francisco Rodríguez (2–0) LP: Mike Stanton (0–1) Sv: Troy Percival (2); Home runs: NYY: None; ANA: Adam Kennedy (1), Tim Salmon (2)

==== Game Four ====
October 5, 2002 at Edison International Field of Anaheim in Anaheim, CA

Team	1	2	3	4	5	6	7	8	9	R	H	E
New York	0	1	0	0	1	1	1	0	1	**5**	**12**	**2**
**Anaheim**	0	0	1	0	8	0	0	0	X	**9**	**15**	**1**
WP: Jarrod Washburn (1–0) LP: David Wells (0–1); Home runs: NYY: Jorge Posada (1); ANA: Shawn Wooten (1)

=== American League Championship Series ===
The 2002 American League Championship Series featured the Wild Card winner Anaheim Angels and the AL Central champion Minnesota Twins. The series began on October 8, 2002, with the Angels splitting the first two games at the Hubert H. Humphrey Metrodome. The Angels then went home where they won three straight at Edison Field to earn a spot in the 2002 World Series. Infielder Adam Kennedy was the ALCS MVP.

==== Game One ====
October 8, 2002 at Hubert H. Humphrey Metrodome in Minneapolis

Team	1	2	3	4	5	6	7	8	9	R	H	E
Anaheim	0	0	1	0	0	0	0	0	0	**1**	**4**	**0**
**Minnesota**	0	1	0	0	1	0	0	0	X	**2**	**5**	**1**
WP: Joe Mays (1–0) LP: Kevin Appier (0–1) Sv: Eddie Guardado (1)

==== Game Two ====
October 9, 2002 at Hubert H. Humphrey Metrodome in Minneapolis

Team	1	2	3	4	5	6	7	8	9	R	H	E
**Anaheim**	1	3	0	0	0	2	0	0	0	**6**	**10**	**0**
Minnesota	0	0	0	0	0	3	0	0	0	**3**	**11**	**1**
WP: Ramón Ortiz (1–0) LP: Rick Reed (0–1) Sv: Troy Percival (1); Home runs: ANA: Darin Erstad (1), Brad Fullmer (1); MIN: None

==== Game Three ====
October 11, 2002 at Edison International Field of Anaheim in Anaheim, California

Team	1	2	3	4	5	6	7	8	9	R	H	E
Minnesota	0	0	0	0	0	0	1	0	0	**1**	**6**	**0**
**Anaheim**	0	1	0	0	0	0	0	1	X	**2**	**7**	**2**
WP: Francisco Rodríguez (1–0) LP: J. C. Romero (0–1) Sv: Troy Percival (2); Home runs: MIN: None; ANA: Garret Anderson (1), Troy Glaus (1)

==== Game Four ====
October 12, 2002 at Edison International Field of Anaheim in Anaheim, California

Team	1	2	3	4	5	6	7	8	9	R	H	E
Minnesota	0	0	0	0	0	0	0	0	1	**1**	**6**	**2**
**Anaheim**	0	0	0	0	0	0	2	5	X	**7**	**10**	**0**
WP: John Lackey (1–0) LP: Brad Radke (0–1)

==== Game Five ====
October 13, 2002 at Edison International Field of Anaheim in Anaheim, California

Team	1	2	3	4	5	6	7	8	9	R	H	E
Minnesota	1	1	0	0	0	0	3	0	0	**5**	**9**	**0**
**Anaheim**	0	0	1	0	2	0	10	0	X	**13**	**18**	**0**
WP: Francisco Rodríguez (2–0) LP: Johan Santana (0–1); Home runs: MIN: None; ANA: Adam Kennedy 3 (3), Scott Spiezio (1)

=== World Series ===
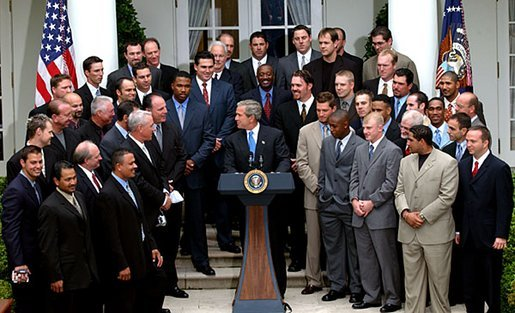
President George W. Bush greets the Angels after their World Series victory

The 2002 World Series was the 98th edition of the Fall Classic, held from October 19–27, 2002. The series featured the American League champion Anaheim Angels defeating the National League champion San Francisco Giants, 4–3, to win the franchise's first ever World Series.

The series was notable as being the first time since the 1995 inception of the wild card in Major League Baseball that two wild card teams would vie for the title. It was also the fourth World Series played between two teams from California (after 1974, 1988, and 1989, when the Giants last went to the World Series), and the first such series to not include the Oakland Athletics. It was also the last Series to be played in a full seven games until 2011.

The series was played as a best-of-seven playoff with a 2–3–2 site format (standard in Major League Baseball). Barry Bonds of the Giants was almost elected World Series MVP before the Angels began their Game 6 comeback; the award would be presented the following night to Troy Glaus of the Angels for his role in that comeback. (Bobby Richardson of the 1960 New York Yankees remains the only World Series MVP from a losing team.)

==== Game One ====
October 19, 2002 at Edison International Field of Anaheim in Anaheim, CA

Team	1	2	3	4	5	6	7	8	9	R	H	E
**San Francisco**	0	2	0	0	0	2	0	0	0	**4**	**6**	**0**
Anaheim	0	1	0	0	0	2	0	0	0	**3**	**9**	**0**
WP: Jason Schmidt (1–0) LP: Jarrod Washburn (0–1) Sv: Robb Nen (1); Home runs: SF: Barry Bonds (1), Reggie Sanders (1), J. T. Snow (1); ANA: Troy Glaus 2 (2)

==== Game Two ====
October 20, 2002 at Edison International Field of Anaheim in Anaheim, CA

Team	1	2	3	4	5	6	7	8	9	R	H	E
San Francisco	0	4	1	0	4	0	0	0	1	**10**	**12**	**1**
**Anaheim**	5	2	0	0	1	1	0	2	X	**11**	**16**	**1**
WP: Francisco Rodríguez (1–0) LP: Félix Rodríguez (0–1) Sv: Troy Percival (1); Home runs: SF: Reggie Sanders (2), David Bell (1), Jeff Kent (1), Barry Bonds (2); ANA: Tim Salmon 2 (2)

==== Game Three ====
Tuesday, October 22, 2002, at Pacific Bell Park in San Francisco

Team	1	2	3	4	5	6	7	8	9	R	H	E
**Anaheim**	0	0	4	4	0	1	0	1	0	**10**	**16**	**0**
San Francisco	1	0	0	0	3	0	0	0	0	**4**	**6**	**2**
WP: Ramón Ortiz (1–0) LP: Liván Hernández (0–1); Home runs: ANA: None; SF: Rich Aurilia (1), Barry Bonds (3)

==== Game Four ====
October 23, 2002 at Pacific Bell Park in San Francisco

Team	1	2	3	4	5	6	7	8	9	R	H	E
Anaheim	0	1	2	0	0	0	0	0	0	**3**	**10**	**1**
**San Francisco**	0	0	0	0	3	0	0	1	X	**4**	**12**	**1**
WP: Tim Worrell (1–0) LP: Francisco Rodríguez (1–1) Sv: Robb Nen (2); Home runs: ANA: Troy Glaus (3); SF: None

==== Game Five ====
Thursday, October 24, 2002, at Pacific Bell Park in San Francisco

Team	1	2	3	4	5	6	7	8	9	R	H	E
Anaheim	0	0	0	0	3	1	0	0	0	**4**	**10**	**2**
**San Francisco**	3	3	0	0	0	2	4	4	X	**16**	**16**	**0**
WP: Chad Zerbe (1–0) LP: Jarrod Washburn (0–2); Home runs: ANA: None; SF: Jeff Kent 2 (3), Rich Aurilia (2)

==== Game Six ====
October 26, 2002 at Edison International Field of Anaheim in Anaheim, CA

Team	1	2	3	4	5	6	7	8	9	R	H	E
San Francisco	0	0	0	0	3	1	1	0	0	**5**	**8**	**1**
**Anaheim**	0	0	0	0	0	0	3	3	X	**6**	**10**	**1**
WP: Brendan Donnelly (1–0) LP: Tim Worrell (1–1) Sv: Troy Percival (2); Home runs: SF: Shawon Dunston (1), Barry Bonds (4); ANA: Scott Spiezio (1), Darin Erstad (1)

==== Game Seven ====
October 27, 2002 at Edison International Field of Anaheim in Anaheim, CA

Team	1	2	3	4	5	6	7	8	9	R	H	E
San Francisco	0	1	0	0	0	0	0	0	0	**1**	**6**	**0**
**Anaheim**	0	1	3	0	0	0	0	0	X	**4**	**5**	**0**
WP: John Lackey (1–0) LP: Liván Hernández (0–2) Sv: Troy Percival (3)

=== Game log ===
2002 Post Season Game Log (11–5)
American League Division Series vs. New York Yankees

#	Date	Opponent	Score	Win	Loss	Save	Attendance	Record	Series
1	October 1	@ Yankees	5–8	Karsay (1–0)	**Weber** (0–1)	Rivera (1)	56,710	0–1	L1
2	October 2	@ Yankees	8–6	**Rodríguez** (1–0)	Hernández (0–1)	**Percival** (1)	56,695	1–1	W1
3	October 4	Yankees	9–6	**Rodríguez** (2–0)	Stanton (0–1)	**Percival** (2)	45,072	2–1	W2
4	October 5	Yankees	9–5	**Washburn** (1–0)	Wells (0–1)	—	45,067	3–1	W3

American League Championship Series vs. Minnesota Twins

#	Date	Opponent	Score	Win	Loss	Save	Attendance	Record	Series
1	October 8	@ Twins	1–2	Mays (1–0)	**Appier** (0–1)	Guardado (1)	55,562	0–1	L1
2	October 9	@ Twins	6–3	**Ortiz** (1–0)	Reed (0–1)	**Percival** (1)	55,990	1–1	W1
3	October 11	Twins	2–1	**Rodríguez** (1–0)	Romero (0–1)	**Percival** (2)	44,234	2–1	W2
4	October 12	Twins	7–1	**Lackey** (1–0)	Radke (0–1)	—	44,830	3–1	W3
5	October 13	Twins	13–5	**Rodríguez** (2–0)	Santana (0–1)	—	44,835	4–1	W4

World Series vs. San Francisco Giants

#	Date	Opponent	Score	Win	Loss	Save	Attendance	Record	Series
1	October 19	Giants	3–4	Schmidt (1–0)	**Washburn** (0–1)	Nen (1)	44,603	0–1	L1
2	October 20	Giants	11–10	**Rodríguez** (1–0)	Rodríguez (0–1)	**Percival** (1)	44,584	1–1	W1
3	October 22	@ Giants	10–4	**Ortiz** (1–0)	Hernández (0–1)	—	42,707	2–1	W2
4	October 23	@ Giants	3–4	Worrell (1–0)	**Rodríguez** (1–1)	Nen (2)	42,703	2–2	L1
5	October 24	@ Giants	4–16	Zerbe (1–0)	**Washburn** (0–2)	—	42,713	2–3	L2
6	October 26	Giants	6–5	**Donnelly** (1–0)	Worrell (1–1)	**Percival** (2)	44,506	3–3	W1
7	October 27	Giants	4–1	**Lackey** (1–0)	Hernández (0–2)	**Percival** (3)	44,598	4–3	W2

Legend: = Win = Loss = Postponement
Bold = Angels team member

=== Bracket ===
Division Series; TV: ESPN/Fox
1	New York Yankees	1
4	**Anaheim Angels**	**3**
**American League**
2	Oakland Athletics	2
3	**Minnesota Twins**	**3**
1	Atlanta Braves	2
4	**San Francisco Giants**	**3**
**National League**
2	Arizona Diamondbacks	0
3	**St. Louis Cardinals**	**3**

League Championship Series; TV: Fox
4	**Anaheim Angels**	**4**
3	Minnesota Twins	1
4	**San Francisco Giants**	**4**
3	St. Louis Cardinals	1

World Series; TV: Fox
AL4	**Anaheim Angels**	**4**
NL4	San Francisco Giants	3

The American League champion had home field advantage during the World Series.
Note: Major League Baseball's playoff format automatically seeds the Wild Card team 4th. Normally, the No. 1 seed plays the No. 4 seed in the Division Series. However, MLB does not allow the No. 1 seed to play the 4th seed/Wild Card winner in the Division Series if they are from the same division, instead having the No. 1 seed play the next lowest seed, the No. 3 seed.

== Awards and honors ==
2002 Anaheim Angels

- 2003 Outstanding Team ESPY Award

Troy Glaus

- World Series MVP

Adam Kennedy

- ALCS MVP

Tim Salmon

- Hutch Award

Garret Anderson

- All-Star
- Silver Slugger Award
- #4 in AL in RBI (123)

Darin Erstad

- Gold Glove Award

Bengie Molina

- Gold Glove Award

Mike Scioscia

- AL Manager of the Year Award

== 73rd Major League Baseball All-Star Game ==
Outfielders

Pos	#	Player	League	AB	H	RBI
LF	16	Garret Anderson	American League	4	0	1

Coaches

#	Coach	League	Position
14	Mike Scioscia	American League	Coach

== Farm system ==
Level	Team	League	Manager
AAA	Salt Lake Stingers	Pacific Coast League	Mike Brumley
AA	Arkansas Travelers	Texas League	Doug Sisson
A	Rancho Cucamonga Quakes	California League	Bobby Meacham
A	Cedar Rapids Kernels	Midwest League	Todd Claus
Rookie	AZL Angels	Arizona League	Brian Harper
Rookie	Provo Angels	Pioneer League	Tom Kotchman

== Local media ==
Local television

Local TV Channel	Play–by–play	Color Commentator	Studio Host
KCAL–TV 9	Steve Physioc	Rex Hudler	

Local cable television

Local Cable TV Channel	Play–by–play	Color Commentator	Studio Host
Fox Sports Net West	Steve Physioc	Rex Hudler	

Local radio

Flagship Station	Play–by–play #1	Play–by–play #2	Color Commentator	Studio Host
KLAC–AM 570 (primary); KPLS–AM 830 (backup)	Rory Markas (innings 1–3, 7–9 and odd numbered innings)	Terry Smith (innings 4–6 and even numbered innings)	Terry Smith (innings 1–3, 7–9 and odd numbered innings); Rory Markas (innings 4–6 and even numbered innings)	

Some radio games carried on KPLS–AM 830 because of broadcast conflict with the Los Angeles Lakers of the (NBA).

Flagship Station	Play–by–play	Color Commentator	Studio Host
KTNQ–AM 1020 (Spanish)	Ivan Lara	José Mota	

Records
Preceded by 2001	Anaheim Angels seasons 2002	Succeeded by 2003
