= Larry Barnes =

Larry Barnes may refer to:

- Larry Barnes (baseball) (born 1974), American baseball first baseman
- Larry Barnes (boxer) (born 1965), American boxer
- Larry Barnes (fullback) (1931–2016), American football player
- Larry Barnes (running back) (born 1954), American football running back
