= Bart Miadich =

American baseball player (born 1976)

- Pitcher
- Born: February 3, 1976 (age 49); Torrance, California
- Batted: Right Threw: Right

Professional debut
- MLB: September 2, 2001, for the Anaheim Angels
- NPB: July 12, 2005, for the Yomiuri Giants

Last appearance
- MLB: August 12, 2003, for the Anaheim Angels
- NPB: September 13, 2005, for the Yomiuri Giants

MLB statistics
- Win–loss record: 0–0
- Earned run average: 6.75
- Strikeouts: 14

NPB statistics
- Win–loss record: 0–0
- Earned run average: 7.17
- Strikeouts: 29
- Stats at Baseball Reference

Teams
- Anaheim Angels (2001, 2003); Yomiuri Giants (2005)

John Barton Miadich (born February 3, 1976) is an American former Major League Baseball (MLB) pitcher who played for the Anaheim Angels in 2001 and 2003.

== Amateur career ==
Miadich played high school baseball for Lakeridge High School in Lake Oswego, Oregon. Miadich attended the University of San Diego, where he played college baseball for the Toreros from 1995-1997. In 1997, he played collegiate summer baseball with the Cotuit Kettleers of the Cape Cod Baseball League where he was named a league all-star.

== Professional career ==
He was drafted by the Colorado Rockies of Major League Baseball (MLB) in 1994, but did not sign a contract with the team. In 1997, he signed as a free agent with the Boston Red Sox and was later traded to the Arizona Diamondbacks. The Diamondbacks released him in 2000.

In 2000, he was signed as a free agent by the Anaheim Angels and spent parts of the 2001 and 2003 seasons with the team before being released. He subsequently signed contracts with the San Diego Padres, Texas Rangers, Florida Marlins, and Tampa Bay Devil Rays. In 2005, he signed with the Yomiuri Giants of the Nippon Professional Baseball (NPB).

== See also ==
- List of Major League Baseball players named in the Mitchell Report
