= Jarrod Washburn =

American baseball player (born 1974)

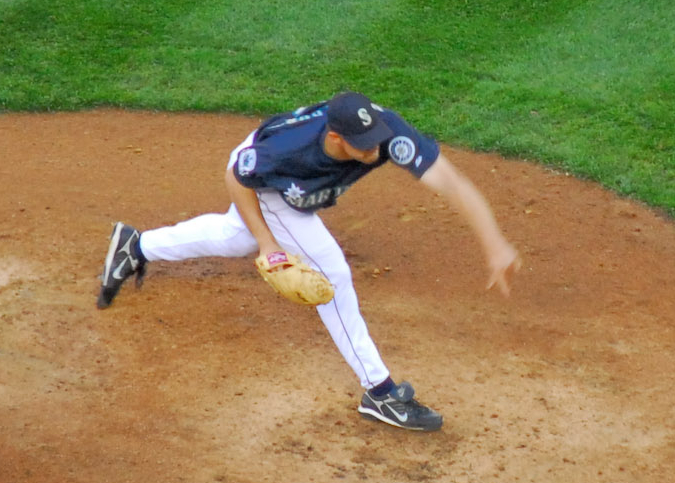
- Washburn with the Seattle Mariners
- Pitcher
- Born: August 13, 1974 (age 51); La Crosse, Wisconsin, U.S.
- Batted: Left Threw: Left

MLB debut
- June 2, 1998, for the Anaheim Angels

Last MLB appearance
- September 15, 2009, for the Detroit Tigers

MLB statistics
- Win–loss record: 107–109
- Earned run average: 4.10
- Strikeouts: 1,103
- Stats at Baseball Reference

Teams
- Anaheim Angels / Los Angeles Angels of Anaheim (1998–2005); Seattle Mariners (2006–2009); Detroit Tigers (2009)

Career highlights and awards
- World Series champion (2002)

Jarrod Michael Washburn (born August 13, 1974) is an American former professional baseball pitcher. He played for the Los Angeles Angels of Anaheim, Seattle Mariners, and Detroit Tigers over the course of a 12–year Major League Baseball (MLB) career.

== Career ==
=== High school / college ===
Jarrod Washburn graduated from Webster High School, in Webster, Burnett County, Wisconsin in 1992. Washburn attended the University of Wisconsin–Oshkosh; he redshirted his freshman year. In his freshman season, he won the championship game of the 1994 NCAA Division III World Series, against Wesleyan University (Connecticut). Washburn pitched eight strikeouts in a 6-2 complete game victory. That season he had a 6-1 record, a 2.03 earned run average (ERA) before being named to the NCAA Division III All-Midwest Region second team. In his 1995 sophomore season, he compiled a 9-1 record, 1.93 ERA. In 1996 (after leaving UW-O in 1995). In 2010, he was inducted in the college's sports Titan Hall of Fame. Washburn was named to the NCAA Division III All-Midwest Region first team.

=== Anaheim/Los Angeles Angels of Anaheim ===
Washburn was drafted by the California Angels in the second round of the 1995 Major League Baseball draft as the 31st overall pick. Washburn began his professional career pitching for the Low Single-A Boise Hawks and Cedar Rapids Kernels in 1995. In 1996, he began pitching for High Single-A Lake Elsinore, was promoted mid-season to Double-A Midland, and promoted late-season to Triple-A Vancouver. Washburn began 1997 back in Double-A and was playing for Triple-A Vancouver in 1998 when he was called up and made his major league debut on June 2. He finished 6–3 in 11 starts.

After dividing his time between the Angels and Triple-A Edmonton in 1999, going 4–5 with a 5.25 ERA in 16 games, in 2000, Washburn once again split time between Triple A and the Angels, going 7–2 in 14 starts.

Washburn was called up for good in 2001; he started 30 games and went 11–10 with an ERA of 3.77 establishing himself as a major league starter.

Washburn's career year was 2002, when he won 18 games and lost 6 with an ERA of 3.15, finishing fourth in American League Cy Young Award voting, and helped the Angels to a World Series championship. In the American League Division Series against the New York Yankees, he went 1-0 in two starts and had an ERA of 3.75. In the American League Championship Series against the Minnesota Twins, Washburn started one game, pitching seven innings and allowing one earned run; however, he struggled in the World Series against the San Francisco Giants, giving up 10 earned runs in his two starts in Games 1 and 5. The Angels would go on to win the 2002 World Series in seven games, in the first World Series ever in which both teams were wild card teams.

In 2003, Washburn went 10–15 and his ERA climbed to 4.43. 2004 was similar with a 4.64 ERA, but with more run support, his record improved to 11-8. In 2005, despite having a record of only 8–8, he had an ERA of 3.20 and became a free agent after the season.

=== Seattle Mariners ===
On December 22, 2005, Washburn signed a four-year contract worth $37.5 million with the Seattle Mariners. In 2006, he finished a disappointing 8-14 with a 4.67 ERA; in 2007, he bettered his ERA to 4.32. In 2008, Washburn struggled early in the season, but from June 9 to August 6, he had an ERA of 3.24. Through August 6, Washburn had the lowest run support in the American League, and was also the victim of seven blown saves in 2008, tying for first in the majors.

On July 6, 2009, Washburn threw the first one-hitter in Safeco Field history. The game was also the tenth one-hitter in Mariners team history, and was very nearly their first perfect game, as Washburn did not walk a batter and faced just one over the minimum in the complete game shutout. Washburn started 7-6 in 2009, and had a 2.87 ERA with only 28 walks through July 18, 2009.

As of the end of July 2009, opposing batters were hitting .224 against him, which was the third-lowest batting average in the league; he was just behind Edwin Jackson (.216) and Matt Garza (.222), and was followed by Scott Feldman (.228; .217 as a starter).

=== Detroit Tigers ===
On July 31, 2009, Washburn was traded to the Detroit Tigers for pitchers Luke French and Mauricio Robles. Washburn, a playoff-tested veteran in the midst of a great season, was expected to shore up a Tigers rotation that had seen seven different pitchers make a start in the fifth starters' spot. Tigers general manager Dave Dombrowski stated that Washburn was "pitching as well as anyone in the league" at the time of the trade. While he had led the American League in earned run average at the time of the trade, Washburn proceeded to go 1-3 with a 7.33 ERA in eight starts for Detroit. Washburn himself noted that while he had "a couple good starts, overall he had not been good." The Tigers, who had been in first place in the American League Central Division since May 8, slowly relinquished their division lead and missed out on the playoffs altogether following a 163rd game tiebreaker with the Minnesota Twins. In addition to French and Robles, the trade also cost the Tigers $3.5 million for Washburn's prorated salary. While the trade was initially highly praised, in hindsight it has been panned by critics and fans.

In 2009, with the Mariners and Tigers, Washburn finished with a combined 9-9 record with a 3.78 ERA in 28 starts.

=== Retirement ===
At the end of the 2009 season, Washburn filed for free agency. According to an interview in the May 6, 2010 issue of the University of Wisconsin-Oshkosh newspaper, The Advance-Titan, Washburn said that he is retiring to spend more time with his family. Washburn currently resides at his home in rural Webster, Wisconsin.

From 2013 to 2021, Washburn served as the head baseball coach at his alma mater, Webster High School, leading the team to a (WIAA) state championship in 2018.
