= José Molina (baseball) =

Puerto Rican baseball player and coach (born 1975)

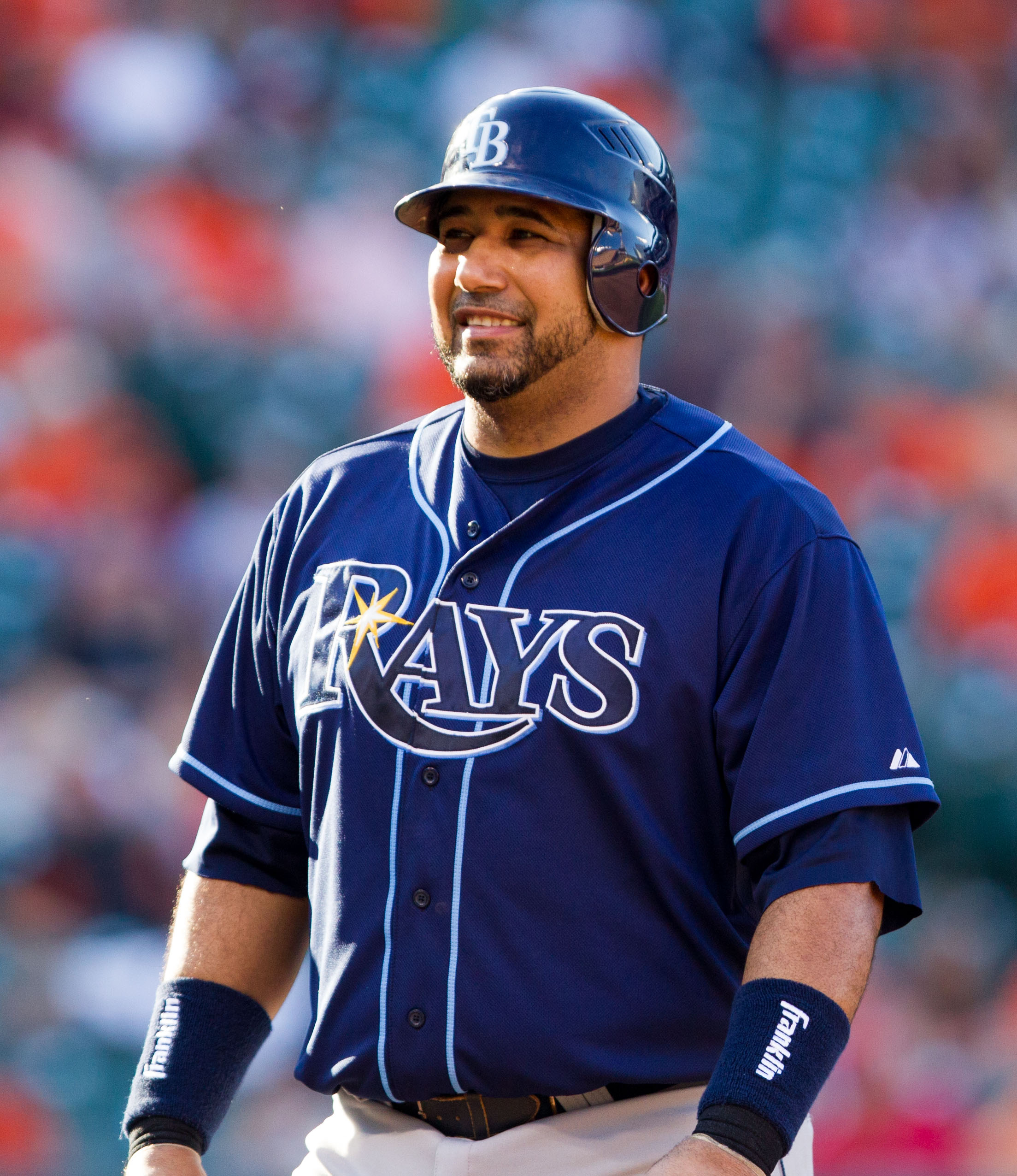
- Molina with the Tampa Bay Rays in 2012
- Catcher / Manager / Coach
- Born: June 3, 1975 (age 51); Bayamón, Puerto Rico
- Batted: Right Threw: Right

MLB debut
- September 6, 1999, for the Chicago Cubs

Last MLB appearance
- September 28, 2014, for the Tampa Bay Rays

MLB statistics
- Batting average: .233
- Home runs: 39
- Runs batted in: 223
- Stats at Baseball Reference

Teams
- Chicago Cubs (1999); Anaheim Angels / Los Angeles Angels of Anaheim (2001–2007); New York Yankees (2007–2009); Toronto Blue Jays (2010–2011); Tampa Bay Rays (2012–2014)

Career highlights and awards
- 2× World Series champion (2002, 2009)
Medals
Men's baseball
Representing Puerto Rico
World Baseball Classic
Silver medal – second place	2013 San Francisco	Team

José Benjamin Molina (Spanish pronunciation: [xoˈse moˈlina]; born June 3, 1975) is a Puerto Rican professional baseball manager and former catcher. He played in Major League Baseball (MLB) for five teams, and for the Puerto Rican national team in the World Baseball Classic (WBC). Noted for his abilities in pitch-framing and in handling pitching staffs, Molina is a two-time World Series champion in MLB and a two-time silver medalist with Puerto Rico.

Molina is the middle of three brothers (older brother Bengie and younger brother Yadier), all of whom have played catcher in Major League Baseball. They are the only three brothers in MLB history to all win World Series rings. Bengie and José did it together as members of the 2002 Anaheim Angels, and Yadier with the 2006 and 2011 Cardinals. José later won a second ring with the 2009 New York Yankees.

== Early life ==
Molina graduated from Maestro Ladi High School in Vega Alta, Puerto Rico in 1993, and attended Ladislao Martinez University.

== Professional career ==
=== Chicago Cubs (1999) ===
The Chicago Cubs selected Molina in the 14th round of the 1993 MLB draft. His first major league team was the Cubs, for which he played 10 games as a September callup in 1999.

=== Anaheim Angels / Los Angeles Angels of Anaheim (2001–2007) ===
He joined the then-Anaheim Angels in 2001 as a free agent, but played only a handful of games before establishing himself during the 2002 season as the Angels backup catcher for his brother, Bengie.

In 2002, Molina got his first World Series ring as the Angels won the 2002 World Series against the San Francisco Giants.

In 2005, he hit a career-best six home runs, and tied his career-high with 25 RBI, as he hit .306 against lefties.

Following Bengie's departure from the Angels, Molina entered the 2006 season as the Angels' new starting catcher, though it was expected that rookie Jeff Mathis would also see substantial time handling the team's catching duties over the course of the season. However, Mathis struggled during the first month of the season and, as a result, he was ultimately demoted to the minor leagues. Molina himself then struggled offensively, and the promising offensive performance of Mathis' replacement on the roster, rookie Mike Napoli, once again relegated Molina to the role of backup catcher. Still, he played in a career-high 78 games and had a career-best 225 at-bats in 2006.

=== New York Yankees (2007–2009) ===
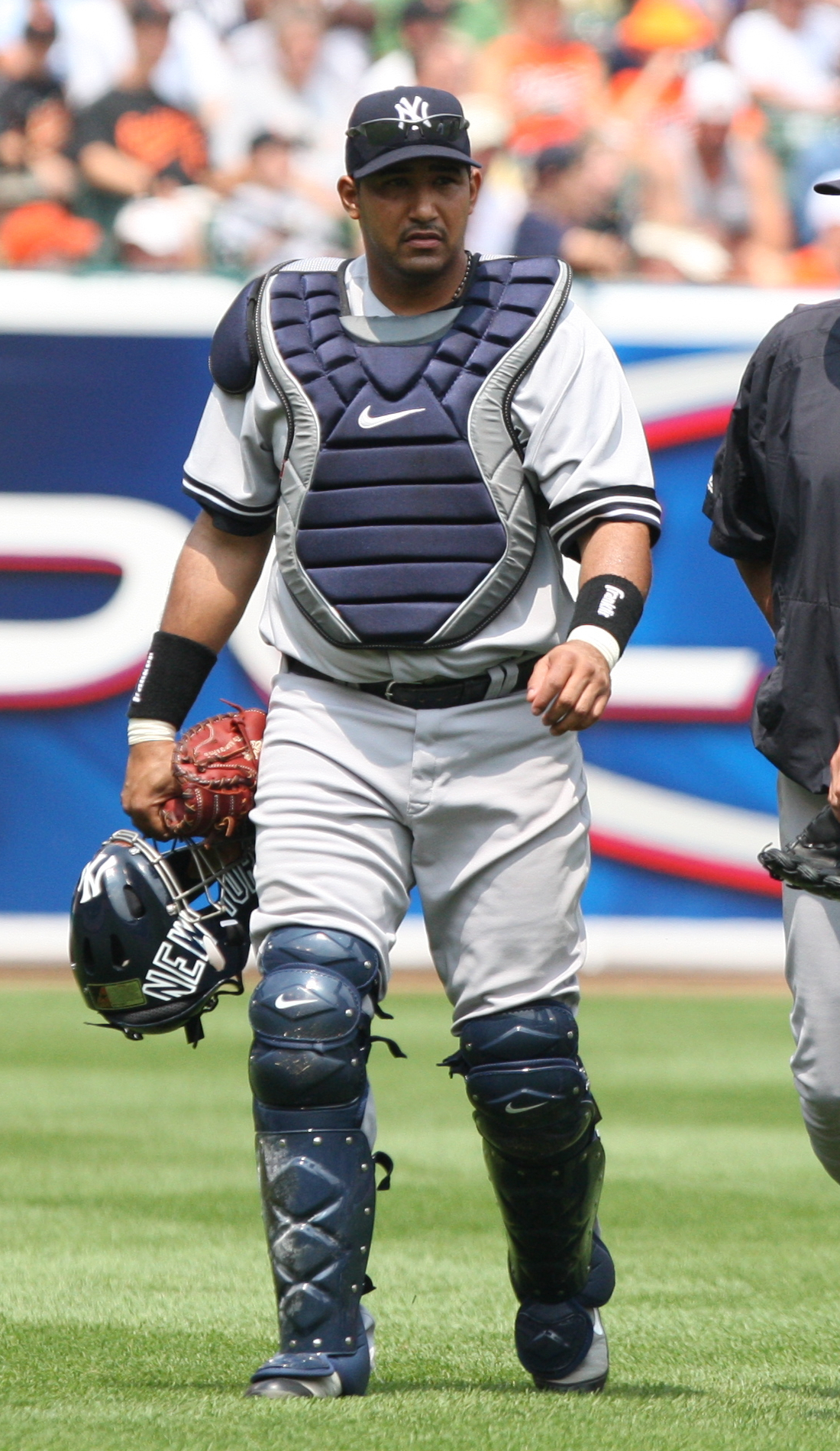
Molina with the New York Yankees in 2007

On July 21, 2007, the Angels traded Molina to the New York Yankees for minor league pitcher Jeff Kennard. At the time of the trade, he had a .237 lifetime batting average, but had hit lefties much better (.269). He would go on to hit .318 for the Yankees with a home run.

On December 3, 2007, the Yankees signed Molina to a two-year deal. He served as the team's starting catcher following a shoulder injury to Jorge Posada, but returned to the backup role when the Yankees acquired Iván Rodríguez.

Molina was successful in eight of nine sacrifice bunt attempts in 2008. On September 21, 2008, Molina hit the last home run in the original Yankee Stadium, in the Yankees' final game at the ballpark, which was against the Baltimore Orioles. Following this event, Molina expressed satisfaction at being the final answer to the question presented by Babe Ruth in his last public speech at the facility, which closed by stating, "I was glad to have hit the first home run in this park. God only knows who will hit the last." Controversy emerged around the home run ball hit by Molina in a dispute regarding ownership involving fans and Yankee Stadium security. Later in 2008, the ball would come to auction, where it was estimated by auctioneer Guernsey's at $200,000-$300,000. ESPN stated "[the ball] was expected to fetch up to $400,000, but was pulled after offers fell short of the suggested opening bid of $100,000." and blamed the 2008 financial crisis.

In 2009, Molina again served as the Yankees' primary backup catcher, catching most of A. J. Burnett's games when possible and hitting .219 in 138 at bats (52 games). On October 29, 2009, in Game 2 of the 2009 World Series, he picked off Jayson Werth at first base becoming the first Yankees catcher to pick a baserunner off in the World Series since Yogi Berra who did the same in the 1950, also against the Philadelphia Phillies. Molina got his second World Series ring as the Yankees defeated the Phillies in the 2009 World Series in six games.

=== Toronto Blue Jays (2010–2011) ===
On February 19, 2010, Molina signed a one-year contract that included an option for 2011 with the Toronto Blue Jays. He had one of his best offensive seasons in 2010, producing a .681 OPS with six home runs over 57 games.

Molina returned to the Blue Jays for the 2011 season, providing veteran guidance to rookie J. P. Arencibia. The club picked up his option for $1.2 million.

In a rarely seen lineup move, Molina was named the designated hitter on May 27, 2011, against the White Sox. In addition to getting three hits off Mark Buehrle, Molina and Rajai Davis executed a double steal; this was only Molina's 11th stolen base in his 12-year career.

=== Tampa Bay Rays (2012–2014) ===
On November 28, 2011, Molina signed a one-year contract with the Tampa Bay Rays. After posting a .223 average with eight home runs and 32 RBI, Molina's 2013 contract option for $1.8 million was picked up by the Rays. On December 2, 2013, after another season with Tampa Bay in which he hit .233 with two home runs and 18 RBI, Molina signed a two-year, $4.5 million contract with the Rays.

Molina was released on November 24, 2014.

== Coaching career ==
On November 6, 2015, Molina was hired as the minor league catching coordinator for the Los Angeles Angels of Anaheim to work with catchers in their farm system. On October 15, 2021, it was announced that Molina would not return to the Angels coaching staff in 2022.

On March 4, 2024, Molina was hired to serve as the manager for the Algodoneros de Unión Laguna of the Mexican League. On July 20, 2025, Molina was fired by the Algodoneros.

On February 19, 2026, Molina was hired to serve as a quality control coach for the Caliente de Durango of the Mexican League.

On May 6, 2026, Molina was hired as the manager of the Saraperos de Saltillo of the Mexican League, replacing Mendy López. He was dismissed on September 28, 2026.

== Defense ==
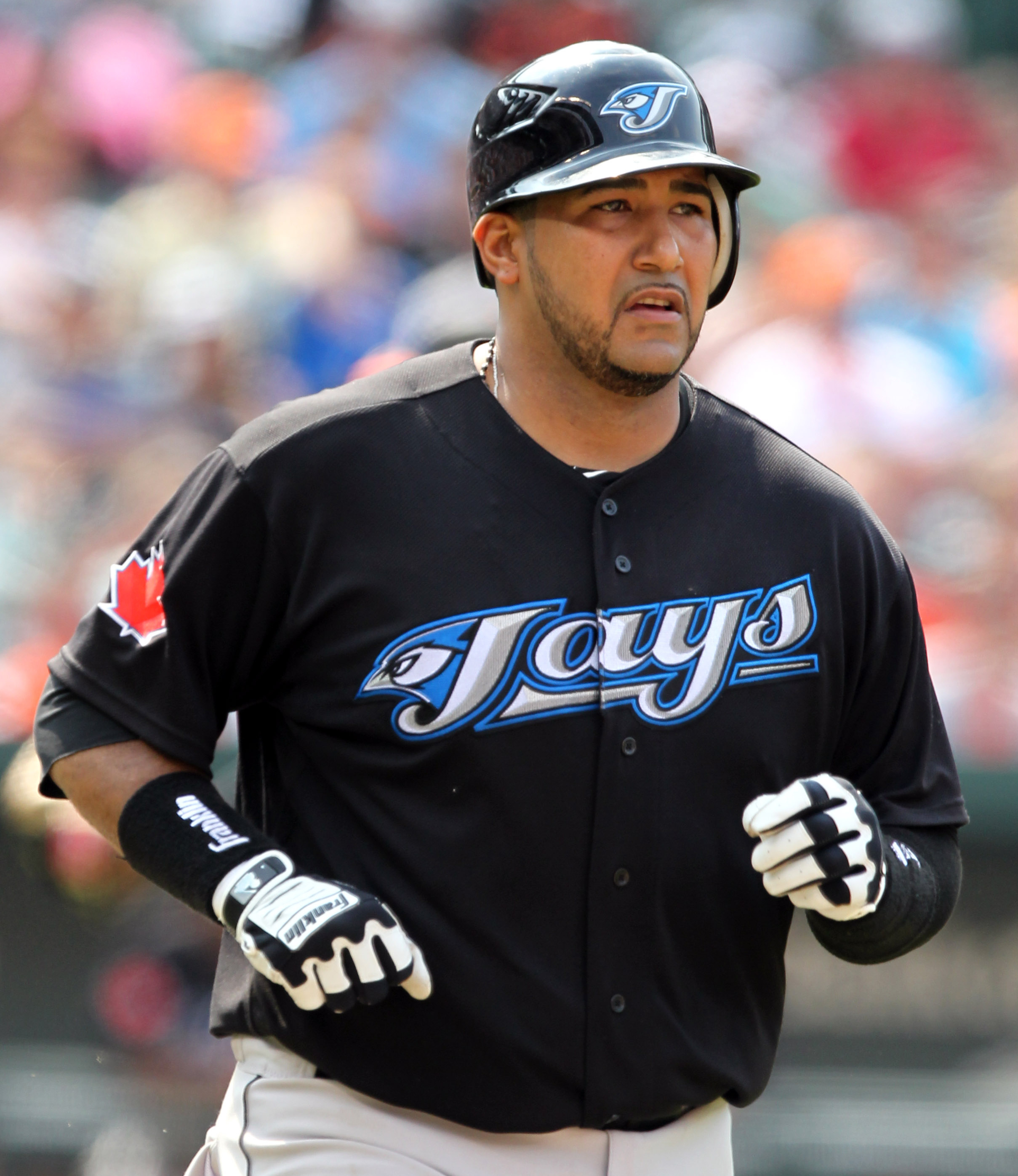
Molina with the Blue Jays

In the minors, Molina was rated as the best defensive catcher in the Pacific Coast League by Baseball America in 2002. In his years with the Cubs and Angels, he displayed better than average range as a catcher, and also played nine games at first base. In 2004, he threw out 22 of 45 base stealers (48.89%), tops in the AL (minimum of 40 attempts). He also led AL catchers with five pickoffs in 2004, despite only 57 starts. In 2005, he caught more than half of those who attempted to steal against him, again the best percentage in the AL. In 2008, he again played excellent defense, and displayed his excellent arm, replacing the injured Jorge Posada.

In a game against the Tampa Bay Rays on April 25, 2010, Molina set a Blue Jays club record by throwing out four attempted basestealers in one game, including defending American League basestealing champion Carl Crawford, who was thrown out twice. This was the first time an AL catcher had caught four basestealers in one game since Terry Steinbach in 1992.

== World Baseball Classic ==
Molina earned a silver medal as a backup catcher to his brother Yadier on the Puerto Rican team during the 2013 World Baseball Classic.

== See also ==
- List of Major League Baseball career putouts as a catcher leaders
- List of Major League Baseball players from Puerto Rico
- List of Puerto Ricans
