= Mark Lukasiewicz =

American baseball player (born 1973)

- Pitcher
- Born: March 8, 1973 (age 52); Jersey City, New Jersey, U.S.
- Batted: Left Threw: Left

MLB debut
- May 11, 2001, for the Anaheim Angels

Last MLB appearance
- September 29, 2002, for the Anaheim Angels

MLB statistics
- Win–loss record: 2–2
- Earned run average: 5.20
- Strikeouts: 40
- Stats at Baseball Reference

Teams
- Anaheim Angels (2001–2002)

Mark Lukasiewicz (born March 8, 1973) is an American former professional baseball pitcher who played two seasons for the Anaheim Angels of Major League Baseball.

Lukasiewicz grew up in Secaucus, New Jersey and graduated from Secaucus High School in 1991 before being inducted into the school's Hall of Fame in 2003.

Drafted by the Toronto Blue Jays in 1993, Lukasiewicz spent from 1994 to 2000 in their minor leagues before signing with the Anaheim Angels in 2001. He made his major league debut at the age of 28 in 2001. He was briefly called up the following year and pitched for two more seasons in the Minors before retiring at the age of 31.
