= José Nieves =

Venezuelan baseball player (born 1975)

- Shortstop
- Born: June 16, 1975 (age 50); Guacara, Carabobo State, Venezuela
- Batted: Right Threw: Right

MLB debut
- August 7, 1998, for the Chicago Cubs

Last MLB appearance
- July 29, 2002, for the Anaheim Angels

MLB statistics
- Batting average: .242
- Home runs: 9
- Runs batted in: 51
- Stats at Baseball Reference

Teams
- Chicago Cubs (1998–2000); Anaheim Angels (2001–2002)

José Miguel Nieves Pinto (born June 16, 1975) is a Venezuelan former professional baseball shortstop. He played for the Chicago Cubs (1998–2000) and Anaheim Angels (2001–02) of Major League Baseball (MLB). He batted and threw right-handed.

== Career ==
In a five-season career, Nieves was a .242 hitter with nine home runs and 51 RBI in 212 games.

He became manager of the Dayton Dragons in 2013.

== See also ==
- List of players from Venezuela in Major League Baseball
