= Shawn Wooten =

American baseball player and coach (born 1972)

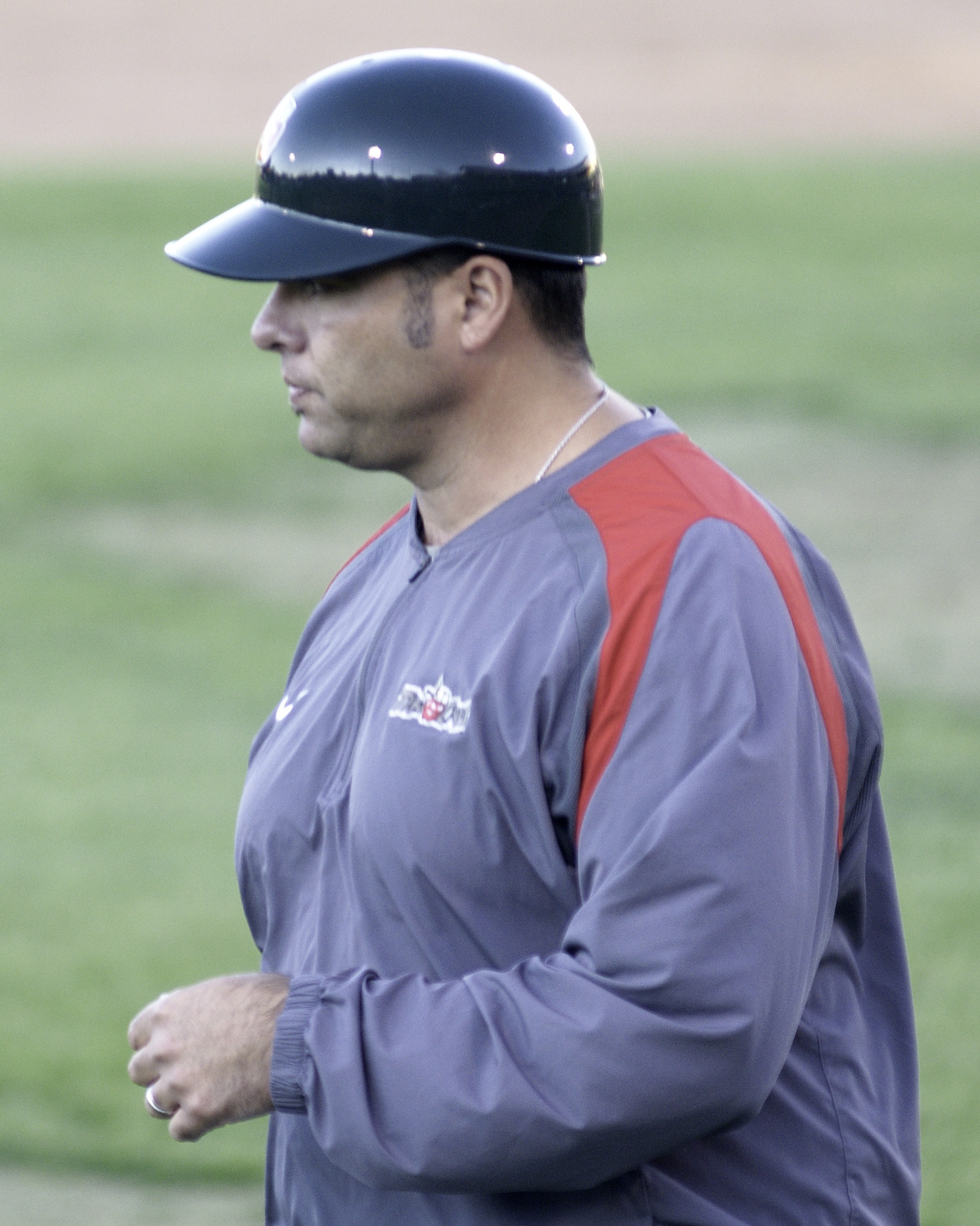
- First baseman / Catcher
- Born: July 24, 1972 (age 53); Glendora, California, U.S.
- Batted: Right Threw: Right

MLB debut
- August 19, 2000, for the Anaheim Angels

Last MLB appearance
- May 26, 2005, for the Boston Red Sox

MLB statistics
- Batting average: .272
- Home runs: 18
- Runs batted in: 86
- Stats at Baseball Reference

Teams
- Anaheim Angels (2000–2003); Philadelphia Phillies (2004); Boston Red Sox (2005)

Career highlights and awards
- World Series champion (2002)

William Shawn Wooten (born July 24, 1972) is the assistant major league hitting coach for the Los Angeles Angels. He is a former professional baseball player. He played all or parts of five seasons in Major League Baseball with the Anaheim Angels (2000–03), Philadelphia Phillies (2004), and Boston Red Sox (2005). He bats and throws right-handed.

A utility player who played first base, catcher, and third base, Wooten compiled a .272 batting average with 18 home runs and 86 RBI in 266 games played in his major league career. A member of the Angels' 2002 World Series championship team, he was a late bloomer, not making the majors until age 28. After that, while he played well in limited playing time, his career was derailed by a pair of injuries.

== Playing career ==
=== Early career ===
Wooten was originally drafted and signed by the Detroit Tigers in 1993 as a third baseman. He played a little over two years in the Tigers organization, but was released in midseason in 1995 after batting .129 in 20 games with Double-A Jacksonville. He signed with the independent Moose Jaw Diamond Dogs of the Prairie League, where he hit .373 over the second half of 1995. After playing for Moose Jaw again in 1996, he was signed by the Anaheim Angels for the 1997 season.

=== Anaheim Angels ===
==== Climbing the ladder ====
The Angels assigned Wooten to the Class-A Cedar Rapids Kernels, where he began learning the catcher position. In 1998, with the Lake Elsinore Storm, he was the club's starting first baseman, and over the next two seasons Wooten continued to play all three positions. In 2000, he batted .353 with the Triple-A Edmonton Trappers, earning a late-season promotion to the major leagues. He made his major league debut on August 19 as the starting catcher against the New York Yankees and was hitless in four at-bats. His first hit was a single to left field against Kelvim Escobar of the Toronto Blue Jays on August 30. He wound up playing in 7 games, getting five hits in nine at bats.

==== Rookie season ====
In 2001, Wooten spent his first full season in the major leagues with Anaheim (qualifying as a rookie) after making the 25-man roster out of spring training. He opened the campaign batting .385 (10-for-26), with three home runs and six runs batted in in April, leading all American League rookies in home runs for the month. His first homer was hit off Mark Mulder of the Oakland Athletics on April 16. In June, he led Angels hitters with a .386 average (17-for-44) and was batting .328 (42-for-128) at the All-Star break, second to Seattle's Ichiro Suzuki among AL rookies (based on 125 at bats). Wooten hit safely in 47 contests, including 17 multi-hit games.

His season ended when doctors discovered torn cartilage in his left wrist in early September and he underwent arthroscopic surgery. At the time, he was hitting .312 (69-for-221) with eight home runs and 32 runs batted in in 79 games and ranked second among American League first-year players with a .466 slugging percentage. Nevertheless, he was selected for the Baseball Digest and Topps Major League Baseball rookie All-Star teams. At the time of the injury, his .312 average was second best among American League rookies and was tops on the Angels' club. He wound up starting the most games (27) at designated hitter, but also played 25 games at catcher and 21 at first base.

==== 2002 ====
After starting the 2002 season in the minor leagues on a rehab assignment, Wooten came off the disabled list in July 2002. He played in 49 of the team's last 76 games, batting .338 (26-for-77) from August through September, including three doubles in a game to tie a team record. Overall, he finished with a .292 average in 49 games, mostly as a DH or first baseman.

In the 2002 postseason, Wooten was used as the club's DH against left-handed pitching, platooning with Brad Fullmer. In the 2002 American League Division Series against the New York Yankees, Wooten started two of the four games at DH and pinch-hit in a third. He had six hits in nine at-bats, including a game-tying home run off David Wells in the fifth inning of Game 4, which the Angels went on to win to finish off the series. In the ALCS against the Minnesota Twins, Wooten started one game and played in two others, going 2-for-8 with one RBI. In the World Series against the San Francisco Giants, who did not start any left-handers, he appeared in three games, going 1-for-2. Overall, he hit .474 (9-for-19) with one home run, three RBI and five runs scored in nine postseason games, third best among all hitters in the playoffs.

==== 2003 ====
In 2003, Wooten posted career highs in games (98), at bats (272), runs (25) and walks (24), hitting .243 with seven home runs and 32 RBI. Anaheim pitchers posted a 3.81 ERA with him behind the plate. After a knee injury, Wooten was used mainly as a pinch hitter. His .350 pinch-average (7-for-20) tied for second in the American League.

=== Philadelphia Phillies ===
Wooten became a free agent after the 2003 season, and signed with the Philadelphia Phillies before the 2004 season. He was used mostly as a pinch hitter and backup to starting first baseman Jim Thome. However, he batted just .184 and was sent to the minor leagues in July, returning when the rosters expanded in September. He became a free agent again after the season.

=== Boston Red Sox ===
The Boston Red Sox signed Wooten to a minor league contract before the 2005 season and assigned him to the Pawtucket Red Sox. On May 19, 2005, the Red Sox placed reserve catcher Doug Mirabelli on the 15-day DL prior to the interleague series opener with the Atlanta Braves, and the Red Sox purchased the contract of Wooten to replace him. At this time, Wooten had seven home runs and 27 RBI in 39 games for Pawtucket and was hitting .225 (34-for-151) when he got the call. He appeared in just one game, replacing Jason Varitek in the late innings of a blowout against the Toronto Blue Jays on May 26, before returning to the minor leagues for the rest of the season. It turned out to be his last major league appearance.

=== Later career ===
He signed a minor league contract with the Minnesota Twins at the beginning of the 2006 season and played for their Triple-A affiliate, the Rochester Red Wings, batting .253. He then signed with the San Diego Padres in 2007, where he began the year with the San Antonio Missions, their Double-A affiliate. He was released on July 17, then played in three games with the non-affiliated St. Paul Saints before the New York Mets bought out his contract. He was released by the Mets on May 3, 2008, and quickly re-signed with the Padres. He became a free agent at the end of the season, but went unsigned to end his playing career.

== Post-playing career ==
After his playing career ended, Wooten joined the Padres organization as an instructor. In 2010, he served as hitting coach of the short-season Eugene Emeralds. He managed the Class-A Fort Wayne TinCaps of the Midwest League in 2011. On November 10, 2011 he was hired as manager of the Lake Elsinore Storm of the California League, the Class-A Advanced affiliate of the Padres. He remained with the Storm through the 2013 season and then was hired as hitting coach for the Double-A Chattanooga Lookouts in the Dodgers organization. In 2015 the Dodgers switched their Double-A affiliation to the Tulsa Drillers and he remained the hitting coach for them. He was promoted to hitting coach for the AAA Oklahoma City Dodgers of the Pacific Coast League in 2016. He left his position with the Dodgers after the 2017 season.

Wooten was employed by the Los Angeles Angels as a minor league hitting director in 2017. In the offseason, Wooten operates a baseball academy for young kids to high schoolers (and sometimes working with college players) in Plymouth, Minnesota. Following his minor league job, Wooten was promoted to the position of Assistant Major League Hitting Coach for the Los Angeles Angels prior to the 2019 season.

Wooten is a member of the Cedar Rapids Professional Baseball Hall of Fame.
