= Al Levine =

American baseball player (born 1968)

- Relief pitcher
- Born: May 22, 1968 (age 58); Park Ridge, Illinois, U.S.
- Batted: Left Threw: Right

MLB debut
- June 22, 1996, for the Chicago White Sox

Last MLB appearance
- June 10, 2005, for the San Francisco Giants

MLB statistics
- Win–loss record: 24–33
- Earned run average: 3.96
- Strikeouts: 278
- Stats at Baseball Reference

Teams
- Chicago White Sox (1996–1997); Texas Rangers (1998); Anaheim Angels (1999–2002); Tampa Bay Devil Rays (2003); Kansas City Royals (2003); Detroit Tigers (2004); San Francisco Giants (2005)

Alan Brian Levine (born May 22, 1968) is an American former Major League Baseball relief pitcher who pitched 234 games in the minor leagues, and 416 games in the major leagues.

== Early life and career ==
Levine, who is Jewish, was born in Park Ridge, Illinois, and graduated from Hoffman Estates High School, attended and played for Harper Junior College, and graduated from Southern Illinois University. In 1989, Levine walked onto the SIU team as a pitcher.

== Baseball career ==
The Chicago White Sox drafted him in the 11th round of the 1991 draft.

=== Minor leagues ===
In 1991 he debuted with the Class A Utica Blue Sox, and was 5th in the New York-Penn League with two complete games. In 1992, he stuck 142 batters between the Sarasota White Sox and the single-A South Bend White Sox, tying for second among White Sox minor leaguers. In 1993, he led Florida State League pitchers with 129 strikeouts while pitching for Sarasota, and came in third in the league with three complete games, and fifth with 11 wins. Levine played AA for the Birmingham Barons in 1994, along with Michael Jordan, until he was called up to AAA mid-season, and came in eighth in with a 3.31 ERA.

In 1995, he started in the Nashville Sounds' starting rotation, but spent most of the season in double-A Birmingham, where he was second on the team with seven saves.

Levine pitched 234 games in the minor leagues, over 11 seasons.

=== Major leagues ===
Levine made his major league debut in 1996 with the White Sox. In 1997, he held batters to a .125 batting average when there were two outs with runners in scoring position. In December 1997, he was traded by the White Sox with Larry Thomas to the Texas Rangers for Benji Gil.

In April 1999, he was selected off waivers by the Anaheim Angels from the Texas Rangers. In 2000, he held batters to a .186 batting average when there were two outs with runners in scoring position. In 2001, he had perhaps his best season. He had a 2.38 ERA (2.11 in relief; second-best among all AL relievers) for the Angels in 64 games, and his eight wins were third-most among all AL relief pitchers. In 2002, he held batters to a .206 batting average when there were two outs with runners in scoring position.

In January 2003, Levine signed as a free agent with the St. Louis Cardinals, but was released in March. In April, he signed as a free agent with the Tampa Bay Devil Rays, who then sold him to the Kansas City Royals on July 31. In 2003, he had another excellent season, splitting it between the Tampa Bay Devil Rays and the Kansas City Royals. He had a 2.79 ERA in 54 games. He held batters to a .189 batting average when there were two outs with runners in scoring position. In December 2003, he signed as a free agent with the Detroit Tigers. In 2004, he held batters to a .154 batting average when there were two outs with runners in scoring position.

For seven seasons in a row, from 1999 to 2004, he pitched in at least 50 games each year.

In February 2005, he signed as a free agent with the San Francisco Giants, who released him in June. On July 7, 2005, he was signed as a free agent by the Florida Marlins, but was released a week later without pitching a game for them.

Levine played for seven major league teams. For his career, he held batters to a .220 batting average when there were runners in scoring position with two outs.

=== Atlantic League ===
In 2008, Levine pitched for the Newark Bears of the Atlantic League of Professional Baseball.

== See also ==
- List of Jewish Major League Baseball players
