= Ben Weber (baseball) =

American baseball player (born 1969)

- Relief pitcher
- Born: November 17, 1969 (age 56); Port Arthur, Texas, U.S.
- Batted: Right Threw: Right

MLB debut
- April 3, 2000, for the San Francisco Giants

Last MLB appearance
- May 8, 2005, for the Cincinnati Reds

MLB statistics
- Win–loss record: 19–8
- Earned run average: 3.77
- Strikeouts: 162
- Stats at Baseball Reference

Teams
- San Francisco Giants (2000); Anaheim Angels (2000–2004); Cincinnati Reds (2005)

Career highlights and awards
- World Series champion (2002)

Ben Edward Weber (born November 17, 1969) is an American chiropractor and former professional Major League Baseball right-handed relief pitcher. As an athlete, Weber was known for a unique pitching windup.

== Career ==
Weber attended Port Neches-Groves High School and then the University of Houston. Weber was selected by the Toronto Blue Jays in the 20th round (537th overall) of the 1991 Major League Baseball draft. After spending six years in the Blue Jays minor league system, Weber was released and pitched in the independent Western Baseball League for the Salinas Peppers in 1996 and in Taiwan in the Taiwan Major League from 1997 to 1998. In 1999, he pitched in the San Francisco Giants minor league system. He was added to the 40-man roster on October 21. On April 3, 2000, Weber made his Major League debut against the Florida Marlins at the age of 30.

On August 30, 2000, Weber was claimed off waivers by the Anaheim Angels, where he had two of his best years. In 2002, Weber and the Angels went on to win the 2002 World Series. In 2003, Weber posted an ERA below 3.00. In 2004, Weber dealt with recurring back and neck injuries and struggled through a difficult season in which he posted an ERA over 8.00. Weber was released by the Angels in September 2004.

On December 15, 2004, Weber signed a one-year contract with the Cincinnati Reds. He could not regain his old form and posted an 8.03 ERA while appearing in only 10 games. On January 11, 2006, Weber signed a minor league deal with the Toronto Blue Jays. At the start of the season, Weber was sent to the Blue Jays' AAA club in Syracuse where he posted a 4.33 ERA in just over 43 innings before being released June 29, 2006. Weber went to spring training with the Houston Astros in 2007. He requested and was granted his release prior to the start of the regular season.

== Personal life ==
Weber retired after spring training in 2007. He then attended Texas Chiropractic College where he obtained his doctorate of chiropractic degree. He resides in Montgomery, Alabama. Weber and his wife have triplet children.
