= Lou Pote =

American baseball player (born 1971)

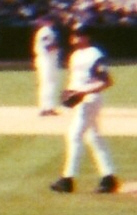
- Pote on the field with the Angels in 2001
- Pitcher
- Born: August 21, 1971 (age 54); Evergreen Park, Illinois, U.S.
- Batted: Right Threw: Right

Professional debut
- MLB: August 11, 1999, for the Anaheim Angels
- NPB: March 29, 2003, for the Hanshin Tigers
- CPBL: April 11, 2008, for the Uni-President 7-Eleven Lions

Last appearance
- MLB: June 9, 2004, for the Cleveland Indians
- NPB: June 6, 2003, for the Hanshin Tigers
- CPBL: September 15, 2008, for the Uni-President 7-Eleven Lions

MLB statistics
- Win–loss record: 4-4
- Earned run average: 3.56
- Strikeouts: 167
- Stats at Baseball Reference

Teams
- Anaheim Angels (1999–2002); Hanshin Tigers (2003); Cleveland Indians (2004); Uni-President 7-Eleven Lions (2008)

Career highlights and awards
- Taiwan Series champion (2008)

Louis William Pote (born August 21, 1971) is an American former professional baseball pitcher. He played in Major League Baseball (MLB) for the Anaheim Angels and Cleveland Indians.

== Early career ==
Pote was originally drafted by the San Francisco Giants in 1990. He began his professional career the following season with the Arizona League Giants, and continued to pitch in the Giants farm system until 1995, when he was traded to the Montreal Expos. He was released by Montreal near the end of spring training in 1997, eventually signing with the St. Louis Cardinals in August. He became a free agent at the end of the season, signing with the Angels.

== Anaheim Angels ==
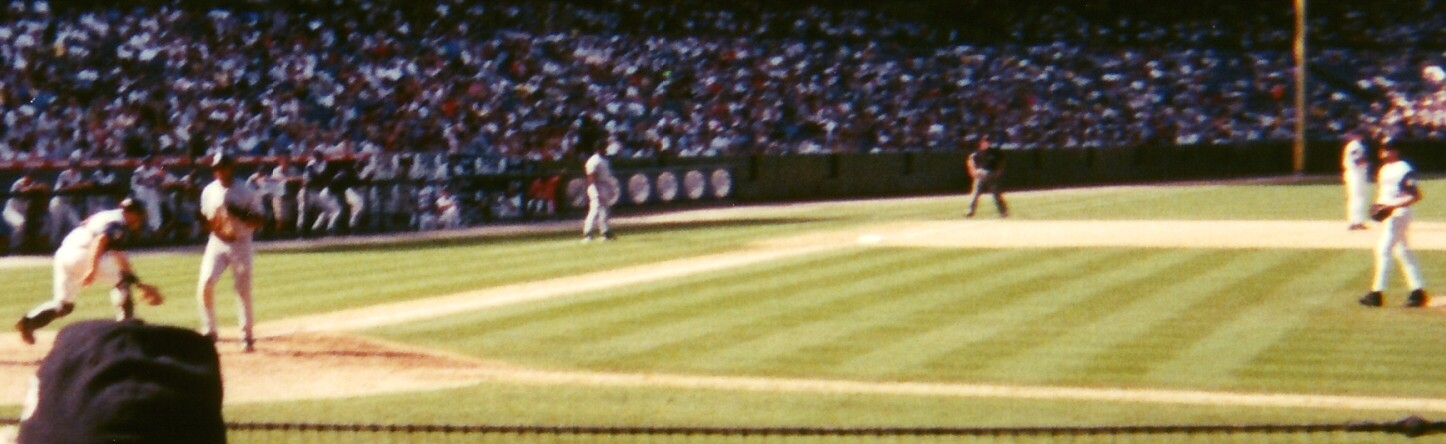
Pote (far right) relief pitching for the Anaheim Angels during a late 2001 game at Edison Field

After pitching for the Midland Angels in 1998, he was promoted to the Triple-A Edmonton Trappers in 1999. He was called up to the major leagues in August, making his debut on August 11. It was in 2001, while pitching for the Angels, that Pote caused mild-mannered Seattle Mariners DH Edgar Martínez to charge the mound for the first and only time in his career.

== Japan ==
Pote was released by the Angels in January 2003, signing with the Hanshin Tigers in Japan. He spent one season in NPB before returning to North America.

== Later career ==
Pote returned to the Cardinals prior to the 2004 season, but his contract was sold to the Indians in May. He returned to the major leagues in June, pitching in two games for Cleveland, before being released from his contract. He signed with the San Diego Padres organization, finishing the season with their top farm club, the Portland Beavers.

After spending 2005–06 in the Texas Rangers organization, Pote signed a contract with the Edmonton Cracker-Cats for the 2007 Northern League season and finished in the top 10 in pitching; he also played for the Atlantic League's Camden Riversharks. In 2008, he played for Chinese Professional Baseball League's Uni-President 7-Eleven Lions.

In 2009, Pote returned to Edmonton with the Capitals, who at the time played in the Golden Baseball League. He started the 2010 season with the Dorados de Chihuahua in the Mexican League, but pitched in just eight games before returning to the Capitals. He retired with the Capitals in 2011 after winning the NABL championship and getting the honors of MVP.
