= Larry Barnes (baseball) =

American baseball player (born 1974)

- First baseman
- Born: July 23, 1974 (age 51); Bakersfield, California, U.S.
- Batted: Left Threw: Left

Professional debut
- MLB: April 11, 2001, for the Anaheim Angels
- NPB: March 27, 2004, for the Osaka Kintetsu Buffaloes

Last appearance
- MLB: July 31, 2003, for the Los Angeles Dodgers
- NPB: September 22, 2004, for the Osaka Kintetsu Buffaloes

MLB statistics
- Batting average: .154
- Home runs: 1
- Runs batted in: 4

NPB statistics
- Batting average: .252
- Home runs: 4
- Runs batted in: 19
- Stats at Baseball Reference

Teams
- Anaheim Angels (2001); Los Angeles Dodgers (2003); Osaka Kintetsu Buffaloes (2004)

Larry Richard Barnes, Jr. (born July 23, 1974) is an American former professional baseball first baseman. He attended Bakersfield High School and then Fresno State University.

== Career ==
He was drafted by the Florida Marlins in the 1993 Major League Baseball draft, but opted not to sign. In the 1994 Major League Baseball draft, Barnes was drafted by the Atlanta Braves in the 51st round. Again, he decided it was best for him not to sign. In 1995, he was not even in the draft-he was finally signed as a free agent by the California Angels.

Not only did Barnes-who is 6'1" and 195 pounds-have a good professional rookie season batting-wise, he also did well when it came to fielding. He hit .310 and had 12 stolen bases in 56 games—and also pitched in three games, won two, and had a 2.25 ERA.

Even though he had success batting in his first pro year, he found minimal success in the years following.

Perhaps Barnes' best professional season came in 1996, when he was playing for the Angels' Single-A, Cedar Rapids Kernels. His statistics for that season:

G	AB	R	H	2B	3B	HR	RBI	SB	CS	BB	SO	Avg
131	489	84	155	36	5	27	112	9	6	58	101	.317

After that season, his success simmered off. But, he still performed well enough to earn a promotion. On April 11, 2001, at 26 years old, he made his major league debut with the Angels. His first glimpse of the major leagues as he hit .100 in 40 at-bats. Perhaps one of the shining moments of his season was one of his four hits was a home run.

Barnes has only made one appearance in the majors since his 40 at-bat season with the Angels. In 2003, with the Dodgers, he appeared in 30 games and hit .211. Since then, he has bounced all over the world, playing in Japan (Osaka Kintetsu Buffaloes) in 2004 and in the Marlins organization in 2005.

In 2007, Barnes played for the Las Vegas 51s in the Dodgers system, but he was released in August.

Barnes currently resides in Bakersfield, California.
