= Scott Schoeneweis =

American baseball player (born 1973)

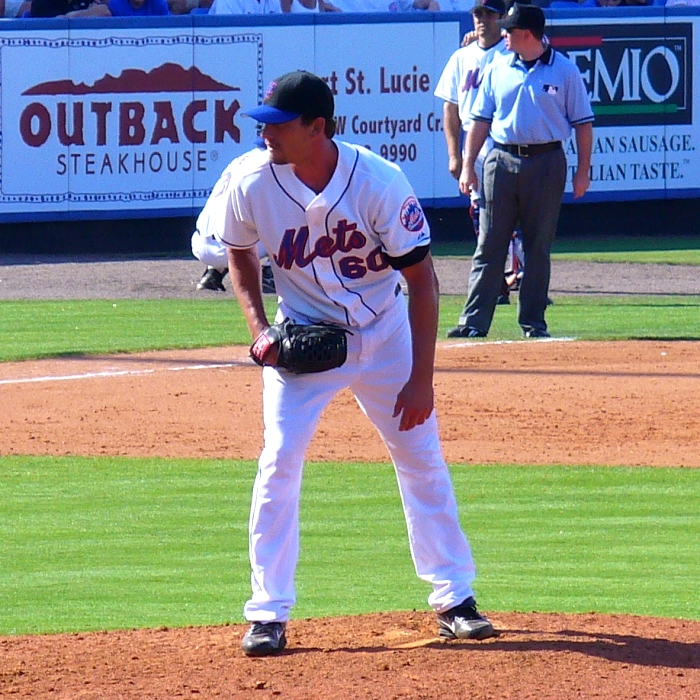
- Schoeneweis with the New York Mets
- Pitcher
- Born: October 2, 1973 (age 52); Long Branch, New Jersey, U.S.
- Batted: Left Threw: Left

MLB debut
- April 7, 1999, for the Anaheim Angels

Last MLB appearance
- May 16, 2010, for the Boston Red Sox

MLB statistics
- Win–loss record: 47–57
- Earned run average: 5.01
- Strikeouts: 568
- Stats at Baseball Reference

Teams
- Anaheim Angels (1999–2003); Chicago White Sox (2003–2004); Toronto Blue Jays (2005–2006); Cincinnati Reds (2006); New York Mets (2007–2008); Arizona Diamondbacks (2009); Boston Red Sox (2010)

Career highlights and awards
- World Series champion (2002)

Scott David Schoeneweis (/ˈʃoʊ.ɪnwaɪs/; born October 2, 1973) is an American former professional baseball left-handed relief pitcher. He played in Major League Baseball (MLB) from 1999 to 2010 for the Anaheim Angels, Chicago White Sox, Toronto Blue Jays, Cincinnati Reds, New York Mets, Arizona Diamondbacks, and Boston Red Sox.

In the five seasons from 2003 to 2007, Schoeneweis allowed only one home run to left-handed batters. Left-handed hitters batted .209, with a .264 slugging percentage and .293 on-base percentage, in 227 plate appearances against him from 2005 to 2006, and then only .207 with a .241 slugging percentage in 2007. In 2008, he was even stingier — lefties batted only .178 against him. That was second-best among all major league left-handers.

Through 2010, he had limited lefties to a .229 average.

== Early life ==
Schoeneweis was born in Long Branch, New Jersey, grew up in Mount Laurel Township, New Jersey, and is Jewish. Among Jewish pitchers, through 2010 he was first all-time in career games played, having passed Sandy Koufax in 2007 and Ken Holtzman in 2008, and 9th in strikeouts (directly behind Larry Sherry), three spots behind Jason Marquis.

He attended Lenape High School in Medford, New Jersey, where he lettered in baseball and basketball before playing collegiately at Duke University, where he was a 1993 All-American as a freshman. That season, he had 12 wins, the second-best record in the school's history. In 1993, he played collegiate summer baseball for the Chatham A's of the Cape Cod Baseball League.

At age 19, he was diagnosed with testicular cancer. The cancer had already spread to his lymph nodes. He said he took "6 months of chemotherapy in 3 months," and commented that "it puts things in perspective." Schoeneweis lost 20 pounds during his recovery.

He next underwent Tommy John surgery on his pitching elbow. He spent the following summer lifting weights and rehabilitating. and returned to Duke University, where he had 10 wins in his senior year, graduating with a history degree.

He played for the United States national baseball team in 1996. He was drafted by the California Angels in the third round of the 1996 Major League Baseball draft.

== Baseball career ==
=== Pitching ===
Schoeneweis had three pitches: a sinking 89–90 mph fastball and slider, which are his better pitches, and a changeup. He was able to get his fastball in on lefties, which keeps them off his breaking ball on the outside corner. He was a ground-ball pitcher and has been used many times as a lefty specialist.

=== Minor Leagues ===
From 1996–2000, in the minor leagues, Schoeneweis was 28–20. In the 1997 Arizona Fall League, he went 3–2 with a 1.98 earned run average for the Scottsdale Scorpions.

=== Anaheim Angels (1999–2003) ===
Schoeneweis started his MLB career with the Anaheim Angels, where in 1999, he appeared in 31 games and finished with a 1–1 record in a season shortened by a torn medial collateral ligament in his left elbow. The next season, he was used as a starting pitcher, pitching in 27 games, all starts, as he went 7–10 with a 5.45 ERA.

In 2001, during which the Angels continued using him as a starter (beginning with opening day), he won a career-high 10 games and finished with a 5.08 ERA. He hit 14 batters (third in the American League).

In 2002, Schoeneweis was used primarily as a reliever, though he made 15 starts, going 9–8 with an ERA of 4.88, and left-handed batters batted only .202 against him. At the conclusion of the season, the Angels captured the American League Wild Card and qualified for the postseason.

Schoeneweis appeared in three games versus the defending American League champion New York Yankees, giving up one earned run. Anaheim took the series 3 games to 1, and defeated the Minnesota Twins in the 2002 American League Championship Series in five games. Scott appeared in one of those games, and did not surrender a run in 0.2 innings pitched. In the 2002 World Series, Schoeneweis pitched in two games and held the San Francisco Giants scoreless in the two innings he pitched. The Angels captured the World Series title in seven games. He started the 2003 season with the Angels.

=== Chicago White Sox (2003–04) ===
During the season, he was dealt to the Chicago White Sox after appearing in 39 games, all in relief, for Anaheim. He was traded with Doug Nickle for Gary Glover, Scott Dunn, and Tim Bittner on July 30. He finished the year with a combined 3–2 record between the Angels and ChiSox, to go along with his 4.18 ERA in 59 games. He was the recipient of the 2003 Gene Autry Courage Award.

The next season, he was used mainly as a starting pitcher by Chicago manager Ozzie Guillén, going 6–9. He held batters to a .111 batting average in games that were late and close.

ESPN reported in 2007, that in 2003 and 2004 Schoeneweis received six steroid shipments from Signature Pharmacy while playing for the Chicago White Sox. Schoeneweis denied the report, and told the New York Daily News that he has never heard of Signature Pharmacy or received shipments from Florida.

=== Toronto Blue Jays (2005–06) ===
He was signed as a free agent by the Blue Jays on January 11, 2005, for $2.5 million, which was just under what he made the two previous seasons combined.

During the 2005 season he slipped on a just-watered field in Oakland, and his fellow Toronto pitchers buckled over in laughter, not realizing that Schoeneweis had just sustained the worst injury of his career. He tore a tendon behind his left knee, near his hamstring, and the tendon remained torn as he pitched over the next two years.

He ended his first season in Toronto with a 3–4 mark, and picked up his second career save. Schoeneweis's ERA improved to 3.32. He also saw action in a career-high 80 games (2nd in the American League). The lefty was also among the league leaders in holds, with 35. Left-handed hitters batted a meager .188 against him. In 2006, he went 2–2 for Toronto with a high ERA of 6.51 in 55 games.

=== Cincinnati Reds (2006) ===
On August 16, Schoeneweis was traded to the Cincinnati Reds for cash. In 16 games for the Reds, he was 2–0 with 3 saves and an 0.63 ERA.

=== New York Mets (2007–08) ===
In January 2007, Schoeneweis agreed to a 3-year deal with the New York Mets worth $10.8 million. He struggled during the season, finishing with an 0–2 record, 2 saves, and a 5.03 ERA in 70 games. He did, however, hold lefties to a .204 batting average and .247 slugging percentage, and held batters to a .221 batting average when men were on base, and a .150 batting average with 2 outs and runners in scoring position. Schoeneweis later revealed that he pitched the 2007 season with a severed tendon in his left knee, affecting his push off the mound.

In 2008, he pitched 73 times, with a 3.34 ERA. Lefties hit only .178 against him, with a .243 OBP and a .277 slugging percentage. He tied for seventh in the National League among left-handers, with 15 holds. With his 73 appearances he became the only pitcher in the major leagues to pitch in at least 70 games each of the five seasons from 2004 to 2008. The only other pitchers to do so in the four seasons from 2005 to 2008 were Chad Qualls, Bob Howry, and Dan Wheeler. He was the losing pitcher in both the final home opener and the final game at Shea Stadium during the 2008 season.

=== Arizona Diamondbacks (2009) ===
On December 12, 2008, Schoeneweis was traded to the Arizona Diamondbacks for Connor Robertson.

He started off the season very well, as in March and April, he kept batters to a .226 batting average. Through May 20, he had given up only three earned runs in 10.2 innings.

Following his wife's sudden unexpected death on May 20, he was briefly placed on the restricted list, and then the bereavement list. He returned to the mound on June 9, but after his return he gave up 15 earned runs in nine innings. Batters hit .391 against him in July, and .444 in August.

He was then placed on the disabled list on August 11, 2009, to give him time to deal with depression resulting from her death and with parenting issues. "It's obviously been a horrific year for him," Arizona manager A. J. Hinch said. "At this point, baseball becomes irrelevant." Four weeks later, he returned to the team for the last three weeks of the season. In November, he filed for free agency.

=== Milwaukee Brewers (2010) ===
On February 9, 2010, Schoeneweis signed a minor league contract with the Milwaukee Brewers with an invite to spring training. He competed to be the second lefty out of the Brewers' bullpen. "If I didn't think I could play, I wouldn't be here. My kids want me to play.... This is my job; this is what I do."

He would have received an $800,000, one-year contract if added to the 40-man roster, with a chance to earn $700,000 in performance bonuses. However, he was released on March 23. Brewers general manager Doug Melvin and manager Ken Macha asked Schoeneweis to take an assignment to the Triple-A Nashville Sounds, but he declined.

Brewers pitching coach Rick Peterson said:

He did not face that many [left-handed batters in spring training], but I am almost certain that he got every left-hander he faced out. Under different circumstances, this would have been a great fit. But Mitch [Stetter] did so well last year. He was one of the left-handed guys in the game. ... Schoeneweis is an effective big league pitcher, without an opportunity here.

=== Boston Red Sox (2010) ===
On March 26, 2010, Schoeneweis signed a minor league contract with a spring training invitation with the Boston Red Sox. In 15 games and 31 innings at Fenway Park in his career, he had a 2.59 ERA, with a .168 batting average against and .224 slugging percentage against. According to Red Sox pitching coach John Farrell, one of the main factors in the competition for the final two roster spots in the bullpen was "being able to match up left on left". Red Sox manager Terry Francona said: "I haven't even seen Schoeneweis yet, but the one thing he's been able to do is get left-handers out." According to a team source, he was to make $500,000 if he were to make the team.

On April 4, the Red Sox added him to their Opening Day major league roster. On May 20, Schoeneweis was designated for assignment after pitching in 15 games.

== Mitchell Report ==
The Baseball Commissioner's Office met with Schoeneweis in 2007 to discuss allegations filed in the Mitchell Report, an independent investigation into the use of steroids in major league baseball. The Commissioner's Office announced on December 6, 2007, that there was insufficient evidence against Schoeneweis to warrant any disciplinary action.

Schoeneweis said that his employers were aware of his use of steroids, which he took in conjunction with his treatment for testicular cancer. "I was just trying to get to normal, not above normal. It's all well-documented," Schoeneweis said.

== Personal life ==
On May 20, 2009, his wife, Gabrielle Dawn Schoeneweis, 38, was found dead in their home in Fountain Hills, Arizona. The autopsy found the cause of death to be an overdose of cocaine and the anesthetic lidocaine. Schoeneweis and his wife had four children (including his wife's daughter from a prior marriage), and had celebrated their 10th anniversary in January 2009.

Schoeneweis left Miami, Florida, where the Diamondbacks were playing a series with the Marlins, to fly to Phoenix on a private charter arranged by the Diamondbacks. General Manager Josh Byrnes said on May 27 that the Commissioner's Office granted the team permission to place Schoeneweis on the restricted list after his seven-day stint on the bereavement list expired. Schoeneweis considered retirement, but changed his mind.

Schoeneweis returned to the club on June 9, 2009. "I think I will be OK," he said. "It's time for Daddy to go back to work." However, he was unable to focus on baseball, and was tagged for 15 runs in 9 innings. "He showed a lot of character coming back to pitch last season, even though he didn't pitch the way he wanted to," said pitcher Doug Davis. He was placed on the disabled list on August 11, 2009, to give him time to deal with depression resulting from his wife's death.

== See also ==
- List of Jewish Major League Baseball players
- List of Major League Baseball players named in the Mitchell Report
