= Minoa (disambiguation) =

Minoa is the name of bronze-age settlements in the Mediterranean coasts:

Minoa may also refer to:

Cities

- Minoa (Amorgos), a town of ancient Amorgos, Greece
- Minoa (eastern Crete), a city of ancient Crete, Greece
- Minoa (western Crete), a town of ancient Crete, Greece
- Minoa (Paros), a town of ancient Paros, Greece
- Minoa (Siphnos), a town of ancient Siphnos, Greece
- Heraclea Minoa, an ancient town in Sicily
- Minoa, New York, a village in New York, United States

Biology

- Minoa (moth), a genus of moth

Other uses

- Minoa, ancient name of Paros, an island of Greece
- Minoan civilization
- East Syracuse-Minoa Central High School
- East Syracuse-Minoa Central School District
