= 2001 New York Yankees season =

Season for the Major League Baseball team the New York Yankees

2001 New York Yankees
- American League champions American League East champions
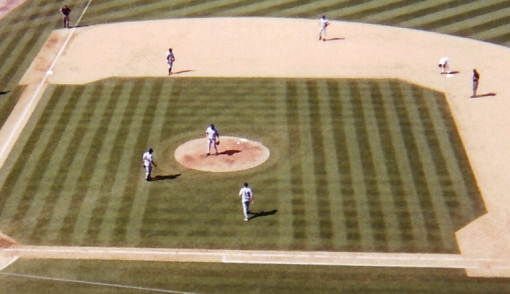
- Yankees' fielders huddling on the pitcher's mound during an August 2001 away game
- League: American League
- Division: East
- Ballpark: Yankee Stadium
- City: New York City
- Record: 95–65 (.594)
- Divisional place: 1st
- Owners: George Steinbrenner
- General managers: Brian Cashman
- Managers: Joe Torre
- Television: WNYW (Bobby Murcer, Tim McCarver); MSG (Ken Singleton, Jim Kaat, Al Trautwig, Suzyn Waldman)
- Radio: WABC (AM) (John Sterling, Michael Kay)

The 2001 New York Yankees season was the 99th season for the Yankees. The team finished with a record of 95–65 finishing 13.5 games ahead of the Boston Red Sox. New York was managed by Joe Torre. The Yankees played at Yankee Stadium. Roger Clemens had sixteen straight wins, tying an American League mark shared by Walter Johnson, Lefty Grove, Schoolboy Rowe, and Smoky Joe Wood. Clemens would finish the season with the AL Cy Young Award and become the first pitcher to win six Cy Young Awards.

Another chapter was written in the story of the Yankees-Red Sox rivalry when, on September 2, 2001, Mike Mussina came within one strike of a perfect game before surrendering a bloop single to Carl Everett. This was Mussina's third time taking a perfect game to or beyond the 8th inning. Coincidentally, it would have been the 3rd perfect game for the Yankees in a span of 4 seasons and could have been the 4th perfect game in franchise history.

In the emotional times of the fall of 2001 in New York City, following the September 11 attacks on New York's World Trade Center, the Yankees defeated the Oakland A's three games to two in the ALDS, and then the Seattle Mariners, who had won 116 games, four games to one in the ALCS. By winning the pennant for a fourth straight year, the 1998–2001 Yankees joined the 1921–1924 New York Giants, and the Yankee teams of 1936–1939, 1949–1953, 1955–1958 and 1960–1964 as the only dynasties to reach at least four straight pennants. The Yankees had now won eleven consecutive postseason series over a four-year period. However, the Yankees lost the World Series in a dramatic 7-game series to the Arizona Diamondbacks, when Yankees star closer Mariano Rivera uncharacteristically lost the lead – and the Series – in the bottom of the ninth inning of the final game. With the loss, this marked the second time in five years that a team lost the World Series after taking a lead into the bottom of the ninth inning of Game 7 (following the Cleveland Indians in 1997).

Despite the loss in the series, Derek Jeter provided one bright spot. Despite a very poor series overall, batting under .200, he got the nickname, "Mr. November", for his walk-off home run in Game 4, though it began October 31, as the game ended in the first minutes of November 1. In calling the home run, Yankees broadcaster Michael Kay said "See ya! See ya! See ya! A home run for Derek Jeter! He is Mr. November! Oh what a home run by Derek Jeter!" He said this after noticing a fan's sign that said "Mr. November".

Also, during the emotional times following the attacks, Yankee Stadium played host to a memorial service, just before the Yankees played their first home game following the attacks. The service was titled "Prayer for America".

== Offseason ==
- November 21, 2000: Joe Oliver was signed as a free agent with the New York Yankees.
- November 30, 2000: Mike Mussina was signed as a free agent with the New York Yankees.
- December 7, 2000: Dwight Gooden signed as a free agent with the New York Yankees.
- December 7, 2000: Luis Sojo was signed as a free agent with the New York Yankees.
- December 11, 2000: Brandon Knight was drafted by the Minnesota Twins from the New York Yankees in the 2000 rule 5 draft.
- February 15, 2001: Henry Rodriguez was signed as a free agent with the New York Yankees.
- March 21, 2001: Drew Henson was traded by the Cincinnati Reds with Michael Coleman to the New York Yankees for Wily Mo Pena.
- March 28, 2001: Glenallen Hill was traded by the New York Yankees to the Anaheim Angels for Darren Blakely (minors).
- March 28, 2001: Brandon Knight was returned (earlier draft pick) by the Minnesota Twins to the New York Yankees.
- March 30, 2001: Brandon Knight was released by the New York Yankees.

=== Notable transactions ===
- April 1, 2001: Brandon Knight was signed as a free agent with the New York Yankees.
- June 5, 2001: John Ford Griffin was drafted by the New York Yankees in the 1st round (23rd pick) of the 2001 amateur draft. Player signed June 14, 2001.
- June 5, 2001: Bronson Sardinha was drafted by the New York Yankees in the 1st round (34th pick) of the 2001 amateur draft. Player signed June 13, 2001.
- June 19, 2001: Henry Rodríguez was released by the New York Yankees.
- June 20, 2001: Joe Oliver was released by the New York Yankees.
- July 4, 2001: Bobby Estalella was traded by the San Francisco Giants with Joe Smith (minors) to the New York Yankees for Brian Boehringer.
- July 30, 2001: Sterling Hitchcock was traded by the San Diego Padres to the New York Yankees for Brett Jodie and Darren Blakely (minors).
- August 31, 2001: Randy Velarde was traded by the Texas Rangers to the New York Yankees for players to be named later. The New York Yankees sent Randy Flores (October 12, 2001) and Rosman Garcia (October 11, 2001) to the Texas Rangers to complete the trade.

== Season standings ==
AL East
Team	W	L	Pct.	GB	Home	Road
New York Yankees	95	65	.594	—	51‍–‍28	44‍–‍37
Boston Red Sox	82	79	.509	13½	41‍–‍40	41‍–‍39
Toronto Blue Jays	80	82	.494	16	40‍–‍42	40‍–‍40
Baltimore Orioles	63	98	.391	32½	30‍–‍50	33‍–‍48
Tampa Bay Devil Rays	62	100	.383	34	37‍–‍44	25‍–‍56

== Season summary ==
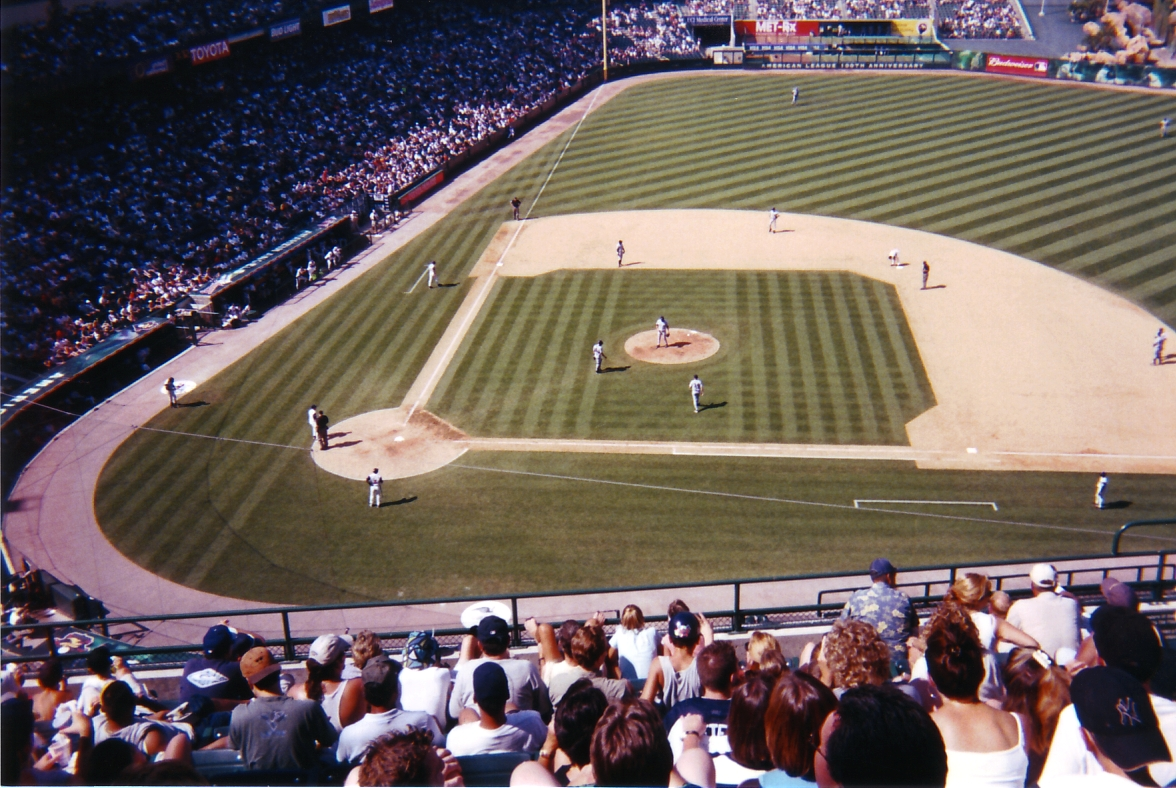
The Yankees taking the field during a late August 2001 game at Edison Field.

=== Record vs. opponents ===
2001 American League record Source: MLB Standings Grid – 2001
Team	ANA	BAL	BOS	CWS	CLE	DET	KC	MIN	NYY	OAK	SEA	TB	TEX	TOR	NL
Anaheim	—	4–5	4–3	6–3	5–4	5–4	5–4	3–6	4–3	6–14	4–15	7–2	7–12	5–4	10–8
Baltimore	5–4	—	9–10	3–4	1–5	4–2	5–2	3–3	5–13–1	2–7	1–8	10–9	2–7	7–12	6–12
Boston	3–4	10–9	—	3–3	3–6	4–5	3–3	3–3	5–13	4–5	3–6	14–5	5–2	12–7	10–8
Chicago	3–6	4–3	3–3	—	10–9	13–6	14–5	5–14	1–5	1–8	2–7	5–2	7–2	3–3	12–6
Cleveland	4–5	5–1	6–3	9–10	—	13–6	11–8	14–5	4–5	4–3	2–5	5–1	5–4	2–4	7–11
Detroit	4–5	2–4	5–4	6–13	6–13	—	8–11	4–15	4–5	1–6	2–5	4–2	8–1	2–4	10–8
Kansas City	4–5	2–5	3–3	5–14	8–11	11–8	—	6–13	0–6	3–6	3–6	4–2	4–5	4–3	8–10
Minnesota	6–3	3–3	3–3	14–5	5–14	15–4	13–6	—	4–2	5–4	1–8	1–6	4–5	2–5	9–9
New York	3–4	13–5–1	13–5	5–1	5–4	5–4	6–0	2–4	—	3–6	3–6	13–6	3–4	11–8	10–8
Oakland	14–6	7–2	5–4	8–1	3–4	6–1	6–3	4–5	6–3	—	9–10	7–2	9–10	6–3	12–6
Seattle	15–4	8–1	6–3	7–2	5–2	5–2	6–3	8–1	6–3	10–9	—	7–2	15–5	6–3	12–6
Tampa Bay	2–7	9–10	5–14	2–5	1–5	2–4	2–4	6–1	6–13	2–7	2–7	—	4–5	9–10	10–8
Texas	12–7	7–2	2–5	2–7	4–5	1–8	5–4	5–4	4–3	10–9	5–15	5–4	—	3–6	8–10
Toronto	4–5	12–7	7–12	3–3	4–2	4–2	3–4	5–2	8–11	3–6	3–6	10–9	6–3	—	8–10

=== Detailed records ===
American League
Opponent	W	L	WP	RS	RA
AL East
Baltimore Orioles	13	5	0.722	104	89
Boston Red Sox	13	5	0.722	68	50
New York Yankees					
Tampa Bay Devil Rays	13	6	0.684	99	60
Toronto Blue Jays	11	8	0.579	108	93
Total	50	24	0.676	379	292
AL West
Anaheim Angels	3	4	0.429	28	31
Oakland Athletics	3	6	0.333	30	44
Seattle Mariners	3	6	0.333	43	55
Texas Rangers	3	4	0.429	31	53
Total	12	20	0.375	132	183
AL Central
Chicago White Sox	5	1	0.833	38	19
Cleveland Indians	5	4	0.556	64	45
Detroit Tigers	5	4	0.556	51	56
Kansas City Royals	6	0	1.000	46	19
Minnesota Twins	2	4	0.333	13	13
Total	23	13	0.639	212	152
National League
Atlanta Braves	1	2	0.333	14	18
Florida Marlins	1	2	0.333	9	24
Montreal Expos	2	1	0.667	19	11
New York Mets	4	2	0.667	26	20
Philadelphia Phillies	2	1	0.667	13	13
Total	10	8	0.556	81	86
Season Total	95	65	0.594	804	713

Month	Games	Won	Lost	Win %	RS	RA
April	26	14	12	0.538	131	116
May	25	15	10	0.600	120	99
June	27	16	11	0.593	147	125
July	28	19	9	0.679	158	132
August	29	15	14	0.517	141	141
September	18	12	6	0.667	83	77
October	7	4	3	0.571	24	23
Total	160	95	65	0.594	804	713

	Games	Won	Lost	Win %	RS	RA
Home	79	51	28	0.646	422	330
Away	81	44	37	0.543	381	382
Total	160	95	65	0.594	804	713

=== Roster ===
2001 New York Yankees
Roster
Pitchers: 57 Carlos Almanzar; 41 Brian Boehringer; 38 Randy Choate; 22 Roger Clemens; 65 Adrián Hernández; 26 Orlando Hernández; 41 Sterling Hitchcock; 60 Brett Jodie; 48 Randy Keisler; 62 Brandon Knight; 61 Ted Lilly; 55 Ramiro Mendoza; 35 Mike Mussina; 43 Christian Parker; 46 Andy Pettitte; 42 Mariano Rivera; 29 Mike Stanton; 56 Todd Williams; 45 Jay Witasick; 39 Mark Wohlers	Catchers: 36 Bobby Estalella; 43 Todd Greene; 14 Joe Oliver; 20 Jorge Posada; Infielders: 57 Erick Almonte; 18 Scott Brosius; 2 Derek Jeter; 60 Nick Johnson; 24 Tino Martinez; 19 Luis Sojo; 33 Alfonso Soriano; 25 Randy Velarde; 14 Enrique Wilson	Outfielders: 12 Clay Bellinger; 17 Darren Bragg; 13 Michael Coleman; 28 David Justice; 11 Chuck Knoblauch; 59 Donzell McDonald; 21 Paul O'Neill; 48 Robert Pérez; 48 Juan Rivera; 47 Shane Spencer; 51 Bernie Williams; 17 Gerald Williams; Other batters: 45 Henry Rodríguez; 48 Scott Seabol	Manager: 6 Joe Torre; Coaches: 40 Tony Cloninger (Bullpen); 52 Gary Denbo (Hitting); 54 Lee Mazzilli (First Base); 30 Willie Randolph (Third Base); 34 Mel Stottlemyre (Pitching); 53 Don Zimmer (Bench)

== Game log ==
=== Regular season ===
Legend
Yankees Win	Yankees Loss	Game postponed

2001 Game Log (95–65) Home: 51–28 Away: 44–37
April (14–12) Home: 9–6 Away: 5–6

#	Date	Opponent	Score	Win	Loss	Save	Location	Attendance	Record
1	April 2	Royals	7–3	Clemens (1–0)	Suppan (0–1)	—	Yankee Stadium	55,814	1–0
2	April 4	Royals	8–2	Pettitte (1–0)	Stein (0–1)	—	Yankee Stadium	26,499	2–0
3	April 5	Royals	1–0	Mussina (1–0)	Reichert (0–1)	Rivera (1)	Yankee Stadium	26,696	3–0
4	April 6	Blue Jays	4–13	Loaiza (2–0)	Parker (0–1)	—	Yankee Stadium	29,606	3–1
5	April 7	Blue Jays	2–3	Michalak (1–0)	O. Hernandez (0–1)	Koch (2)	Yankee Stadium	30,487	3–2
6	April 8	Blue Jays	16–5	Clemens (2–0)	Parris (0–2)	—	Yankee Stadium	31,970	4–2
7	April 9	@ Royals	13–4	Pettitte (2–0)	Stein (0–2)	—	Kauffman Stadium	24,411	5–2
8	April 10	@ Royals	9–5	Mendoza (1–0)	R. Hernandez (0–1)	—	Kauffman Stadium	16,338	6–2
9	April 11	@ Royals	8–5	Williams (1–0)	Meadows (0–2)	Rivera (2)	Kauffman Stadium	19,175	7–2
10	April 13	@ Red Sox	2–3 (10)	Lowe (1–2)	Rivera (0–1)	—	Fenway Park	33,124	7–3
11	April 14	@ Red Sox	3–2	Stanton (1–0)	Schourek (0–1)	Rivera (3)	Fenway Park	33,396	8–3
12	April 15	@ Red Sox	4–5	Garces (1–0)	Pettitte (2–1)	Arrojo (2)	Fenway Park	32,127	8–4
13	April 16	@ Red Sox	1–4	Castillo (1–1)	Mussina (1–1)	Beck (1)	Fenway Park	33,373	8–5
14	April 17	@ Blue Jays	5–6	Loaiza (3–0)	Keisler (0–1)	Koch (4)	SkyDome	20,019	8–6
15	April 18	@ Blue Jays	2–7	Michalak (3–0)	O. Hernandez (0–2)	—	SkyDome	19,770	8–7
16	April 19	@ Blue Jays	6–5 (17)	Choate (1–0)	File (0–1)	Mendoza (1)	SkyDome	24,684	9–7
17	April 20	Red Sox	6–1	Pettitte (3–1)	Nomo (2–1)	—	Yankee Stadium	54,366	10–7
18	April 21	Red Sox	3–8	Castillo (2–1)	Mussina (1–2)	—	Yankee Stadium	55,483	10–8
19	April 22	Red Sox	4–3 (10)	Rivera (1–1)	Lowe (1–3)	—	Yankee Stadium	55,278	11–8
20	April 24	Mariners	5–7	Garcia (3–0)	Stanton (1–1)	Sasaki (10)	Yankee Stadium	29,522	11–9
21	April 25	Mariners	5–7	Charlton (1–0)	Pettitte (3–2)	Sasaki (11)	Yankee Stadium	23,684	11–10
22	April 26	Mariners	3–7	Moyer (4–0)	Mussina (1–3)	Rhodes (1)	Yankee Stadium	30,218	11–11
23	April 27	Athletics	3–2	Choate (2–0)	Mulder (2–2)	Rivera (4)	Yankee Stadium	35,170	12–11
24	April 28	Athletics	7–6	Lilly (1–0)	Hudson (2–3)	Rivera (5)	Yankee Stadium	38,422	13–11
25	April 29	Athletics	3–1	Clemens (3–0)	Zito (3–2)	Rivera (6)	Yankee Stadium	50,572	14–11
26	April 30	@ Twins	1–2	Radke (5–0)	Pettitte (3–3)	—	Hubert H. Humphrey Metrodome	24,629	14–12

May (15–10) Home: 5–3 Away: 10–7

#	Date	Opponent	Score	Win	Loss	Save	Location	Attendance	Record
27	May 1	@ Twins	4–0	Mussina (2–3)	Milton (3–2)	—	Hubert H. Humphrey Metrodome	24,505	15–12
28	May 2	@ Twins	2–4	Mays (4–1)	O. Hernandez (0–3)	Hawkins (9)	Hubert H. Humphrey Metrodome	36,825	15–13
29	May 3	@ Orioles	7–5	Mendoza (2–0)	Paronto (1–1)	Rivera (7)	Oriole Park at Camden Yards	40,218	16–13
30	May 4	@ Orioles	6–5	Stanton (2–1)	Paronto (1–2)	Rivera (8)	Oriole Park at Camden Yards	43,133	17–13
31	May 5	@ Orioles	5–2	Pettitte (4–3)	Roberts (4–1)	Boehringer (1)	Oriole Park at Camden Yards	47,726	18–13
32	May 6	@ Orioles	2–1	Mussina (3–3)	Trombley (1–1)	Rivera (9)	Oriole Park at Camden Yards	47,740	19–13
33	May 8	Twins	0–2	Milton (4–2)	O. Hernandez (0–4)	—	Yankee Stadium	29,326	19–14
34	May 9	Twins	2–0	Clemens (4–0)	Mays (4–2)	Rivera (10)	Yankee Stadium	23,280	20–14
35	May 10	Twins	4–5 (10)	Guardado (2–0)	Rivera (1–2)	Hawkins (11)	Yankee Stadium	29,100	20–15
36	May 11	Orioles	14–5	Mussina (4–3)	Roberts (4–2)	Mendoza (2)	Yankee Stadium	40,433	21–15
37	May 12	Orioles	8–5	Stanton (3–1)	Towers (1–1)	Rivera (11)	Yankee Stadium	48,288	22–15
38	May 13	Orioles	5–10 (11)	Ryan (2–0)	Rivera (1–3)	—	Yankee Stadium	39,819	22–16
39	May 15	@ Athletics	2–3 (12)	Guthrie (2–0)	Mendoza (2–1)	—	Network Associates Coliseum	24,351	22–17
40	May 16	@ Athletics	3–4 (10)	Guthrie (3–0)	Boehringer (0–1)	—	Network Associates Coliseum	43,932	22–18
41	May 17	@ Athletics	3–8	Bradford (2–1)	Mussina (4–4)	—	Network Associates Coliseum	31,073	22–19
42	May 18	@ Mariners	14–10	Mendoza (3–1)	Halama (3–4)	—	Safeco Field	45,794	23–19
43	May 19	@ Mariners	2–1 (10)	Stanton (4–1)	Sasaki (0–2)	Rivera (12)	Safeco Field	45,880	24–19
44	May 20	@ Mariners	2–6	Sele (6–0)	Clemens (4–1)	—	Safeco Field	45,953	24–20
–	May 22	Red Sox	Postponed (rain) Rescheduled for June 4						
45	May 23	Red Sox	7–3	Pettitte (5–3)	Cone (0–1)	—	Yankee Stadium	44,108	25–20
46	May 24	Red Sox	2–1	Mussina (5–4)	Martinez (6–1)	Rivera (13)	Yankee Stadium	55,592	26–20
47	May 25	@ Indians	4–6	Rodriguez (2–1)	O. Hernandez (0–5)	Wickman (9)	Jacobs Field	42,455	26–21
48	May 26	@ Indians	12–5	Clemens (5–1)	Sabathia (5–2)	—	Jacobs Field	42,528	27–21
49	May 27	@ Indians	6–2	Lilly (2–0)	Colon (4–5)	Rivera (14)	Jacobs Field	42,570	28–21
50	May 28	@ Red Sox	4–3	Pettitte (6–3)	Schourek (0–3)	Rivera (15)	Fenway Park	33,125	29–21
51	May 30	@ Red Sox	0–3	Martinez (7–1)	Mussina (5–5)	Lowe (5)	Fenway Park	33,711	29–22

June (16–11) Home: 11–7 Away: 5–4

#	Date	Opponent	Score	Win	Loss	Save	Location	Attendance	Record
52	June 1	Indians	4–7 (6)	Sabathia (6–2)	Lilly (2–1)	Rincon (1)	Yankee Stadium	42,032	29–23
53	June 2	Indians	9–4	Clemens (6–1)	Colon (4–6)	Rivera (16)	Yankee Stadium	46,618	30–23
54	June 3	Indians	3–4	Nagy (1–0)	Pettitte (6–4)	Wickman (12)	Yankee Stadium	47,300	30–24
55	June 4	Red Sox	7–6	Rivera (2–3)	Beck (1–3)	—	Yankee Stadium	41,771	31–24
56	June 5	Orioles	3–10	Johnson (5–3)	Mussina (5–6)	—	Yankee Stadium	30,605	31–25
57	June 6	Orioles	7–4	Stanton (5–1)	Groom (1–1)	Rivera (17)	Yankee Stadium	25,137	32–25
58	June 7	Orioles	4–0	Clemens (7–1)	Ponson (3–4)	—	Yankee Stadium	30,786	33–25
59	June 8	Braves	7–4	Pettitte (7–4)	Glavine (6–4)	Rivera (18)	Yankee Stadium	50,090	34–25
60	June 9	Braves	6–10	Cabrera (4–1)	Choate (2–1)	Rocker (17)	Yankee Stadium	55,107	34–26
61	June 10	Braves	1–4	Maddux (6–5)	Mussina (5–7)	Rocker (18)	Yankee Stadium	41,392	34–27
62	June 12	Expos	1–2 (12)	Strickland (1–3)	Mendoza (3–2)	—	Yankee Stadium	30,034	34–28
63	June 13	Expos	9–3	Clemens (8–1)	Irabu (0–2)	—	Yankee Stadium	24,960	35–28
64	June 14	Expos	9–6	Keisler (1–1)	Yoshii (2–3)	Rivera (19)	Yankee Stadium	33,306	36–28
65	June 15	@ Mets	5–4	Mendoza (4–2)	Leiter (3–5)	Rivera (20)	Shea Stadium	54,110	37–28
66	June 16	@ Mets	2–1	Mussina (6–7)	Appier (4–6)	Rivera (21)	Shea Stadium	54,195	38–28
67	June 17	@ Mets	7–8	Wendell (2–2)	Almanzar (0–1)	Benitez (11)	Shea Stadium	54,399	38–29
68	June 18	@ Tigers	10–1	Clemens (9–1)	Weaver (6–7)	—	Comerica Park	29,365	39–29
69	June 19	@ Tigers	1–7	Sparks (5–2)	Keisler (1–2)	—	Comerica Park	24,171	39–30
70	June 20	@ Tigers	2–5	Holt (6–5)	A. Hernandez (0–1)	Anderson (6)	Comerica Park	23,618	39–31
–	June 21	@ Tigers	Postponed (rain) Rescheduled for July 18						
71	June 22	@ Devil Rays	6–3	Mussina (7–7)	Lopez (3–10)	Rivera (22)	Tropicana Field	24,718	40–31
72	June 23	@ Devil Rays	2–1	Clemens (10–1)	Wallace (0–1)	Rivera (23)	Tropicana Field	27,816	41–31
73	June 24	@ Devil Rays	4–5	Phelps (1–1)	Stanton (5–2)	—	Tropicana Field	27,999	41–32
74	June 25	Indians	8–7	Witasick (6–2)	Rincon (1–1)	Rivera (24)	Yankee Stadium	40,852	42–32
75	June 26	Indians	3–5	Nagy (2–2)	A. Hernandez (0–2)	Rocker (21)	Yankee Stadium	40,346	42–33
76	June 27	Indians	15–5	Mussina (8–7)	Sabathia (7–3)	—	Yankee Stadium	45,539	43–33
77	June 29	Devil Rays	7–5	Clemens (11–1)	Rekar (1–9)	Rivera (25)	Yankee Stadium	38,416	44–33
78	June 30	Devil Rays	5–4	Stanton (6–2)	Creek (2–2)	Rivera (26)	Yankee Stadium	42,544	45–33

July (19–9) Home: 9–4 Away: 10–5

#	Date	Opponent	Score	Win	Loss	Save	Location	Attendance	Record
79	July 1	Devil Rays	6–1	Pettitte (8–4)	Sturtze (3–7)	—	Yankee Stadium	41,983	46–33
80	July 2	Devil Rays	7–1	Mussina (9–7)	Lopez (3–11)	—	Yankee Stadium	43,029	47–33
81	July 3	@ Orioles	10–6	Mendoza (5–2)	Mercedes (4–9)	—	Oriole Park at Camden Yards	47,702	48–33
82	July 4	@ Orioles	4–3	Clemens (12–1)	Maduro (0–2)	Rivera (27)	Oriole Park at Camden Yards	47,355	49–33
83	July 5	@ Orioles	6–3	Lilly (3–1)	Towers (6–3)	Rivera (28)	Oriole Park at Camden Yards	44,635	50–33
84	July 6	Mets	8–3	Pettitte (9–4)	Leiter (4–8)	Mendoza (3)	Yankee Stadium	55,534	51–33
85	July 7	Mets	0–3 (10)	Franco (4–1)	Rivera (2–4)	Benitez (18)	Yankee Stadium	55,589	51–34
86	July 8	Mets	4–1	Mendoza (6–2)	Wendell (3–3)	Rivera (29)	Yankee Stadium	55,528	52–34
72nd All-Star Game in Seattle, Washington
87	July 12	@ Marlins	3–9	Burnett (6–5)	Mussina (9–8)	—	Pro Player Stadium	32,629	52–35
88	July 13	@ Marlins	1–11	Smith (5–5)	Lilly (3–2)	—	Pro Player Stadium	44,313	52–36
89	July 14	@ Marlins	5–4 (10)	Rivera (3–4)	Alfonseca (3–3)	Mendoza (4)	Pro Player Stadium	39,583	53–36
90	July 15	@ Phillies	3–9	Person (7–5)	Pettitte (9–5)	—	Veterans Stadium	59,470	53–37
91	July 16	@ Phillies	6–3 (13)	Stanton (7–2)	Telemaco (5–5)	Rivera (30)	Veterans Stadium	46,446	54–37
92	July 17	@ Phillies	4–1 (12)	Choate (3–1)	Gomes (4–3)	Rivera (31)	Veterans Stadium	47,529	55–37
93	July 18 (1)	@ Tigers	8–5	Clemens (13–1)	Sparks (7–4)	Rivera (32)	Comerica Park	14,800	56–37
94	July 18 (2)	@ Tigers	4–12	Santos (2–2)	Lilly (3–3)	—	Comerica Park	33,216	56–38
95	July 19	@ Tigers	2–11	Lima (3–3)	Pettitte (9–6)	—	Comerica Park	35,320	56–39
96	July 20	Blue Jays	4–10	Loaiza (6–9)	Jodie (0–1)	—	Yankee Stadium	46,634	56–40
97	July 21	Blue Jays	3–5	Quantrill (8–2)	Rivera (3–5)	Koch (19)	Yankee Stadium	55,264	56–41
98	July 22	Blue Jays	7–3	Mussina (10–8)	Carpenter (7–7)	—	Yankee Stadium	51,132	57–41
99	July 23	Blue Jays	7–2	Clemens (14–1)	Parris (4–6)	—	Yankee Stadium	38,573	58–41
100	July 24	Tigers	6–5	Pettitte (10–6)	Sparks (7–5)	Rivera (33)	Yankee Stadium	34,519	59–41
101	July 25	Tigers	4–2	Witasick (7–2)	Lima (3–4)	Rivera (34)	Yankee Stadium	34,480	60–41
102	July 26	Tigers	14–8	Mendoza (7–2)	Holt (7–8)	—	Yankee Stadium	45,221	61–41
103	July 27	@ Blue Jays	9–1	Mussina (11–8)	Carpenter (7–8)	—	SkyDome	36,666	62–41
104	July 28	@ Blue Jays	12–1	Clemens (15–1)	Escobar (2–5)	—	SkyDome	44,105	63–41
105	July 29	@ Blue Jays	9–3	Pettitte (11–6)	Hamilton (5–8)	—	SkyDome	40,149	64–41
106	July 31	Rangers	2–6	Oliver (9–6)	Lilly (3–4)	Zimmerman (21)	Yankee Stadium	45,978	64–42

August (15–14) Home: 9–6 Away: 6–8

#	Date	Opponent	Score	Win	Loss	Save	Location	Attendance	Record
107	August 1	Rangers	9–7	Hitchcock (3–1)	Bell (4–6)	Rivera (35)	Yankee Stadium	41,714	65–42
108	August 2	Rangers	2–12	Myette (1–1)	Mussina (11–9)	—	Yankee Stadium	52,169	65–43
109	August 3	Angels	4–2	Pettitte (12–6)	Washburn (9–5)	Rivera (36)	Yankee Stadium	40,490	66–43
110	August 4	Angels	5–4	Rivera (4–5)	Levine (5–6)	—	Yankee Stadium	46,416	67–43
111	August 5	Angels	3–4	Ortiz (10–7)	Mendoza (7–3)	Percival (29)	Yankee Stadium	48,978	67–44
112	August 6	Angels	1–3	Pote (2–0)	Hitchock (3–2)	Percival (30)	Yankee Stadium	40,232	67–45
113	August 7	@ Devil Rays	2–3	Sturtze (7–9)	Mussina (11–10)	Yan (15)	Tropicana Field	22,429	67–46
114	August 8	@ Devil Rays	16–1	Pettitte (13–6)	Bierbrodt (2–4)	—	Tropicana Field	18,830	68–46
115	August 9	@ Devil Rays	4–3	Mendoza (8–3)	Yan (3–5)	Rivera (37)	Tropicana Field	21,223	69–46
116	August 10	@ Athletics	1–8	Lidle (7–5)	Lilly (3–5)	—	Network Associates Coliseum	38,728	69–47
117	August 11	@ Athletics	6–8	Magnante (1–1)	Hitchock (3–3)	Isringhausen (23)	Network Associates Coliseum	45,253	69–48
118	August 12	@ Athletics	2–4	Mulder (15–6)	Stanton (7–3)	—	Network Associates Coliseum	47,725	69–49
119	August 14	Devil Rays	5–3	Pettitte (14–6)	Kennedy (3–8)	Rivera (38)	Yankee Stadium	34,521	70–49
120	August 15	Devil Rays	10–3	Clemens (16–1)	Wilson (5–8)	—	Yankee Stadium	32,103	71–49
121	August 16	Devil Rays	12–5	Hitchock (4–3)	Rupe (5–10)	—	Yankee Stadium	43,600	72–49
122	August 17	Mariners	4–0	Mussina (12–10)	Abbott (12–3)	Mendoza (5)	Yankee Stadium	54,616	73–49
123	August 18	Mariners	6–7	Rhodes (8–0)	Lilly (3–6)	Sasaki (38)	Yankee Stadium	55,294	73–50
124	August 19	Mariners	2–10	Moyer (14–5)	Pettitte (14–7)	—	Yankee Stadium	54,339	73–51
125	August 20	@ Rangers	9–5	Stanton (8–3)	Moreno (3–3)	—	The Ballpark in Arlington	35,125	74–51
126	August 21	@ Rangers	3–13	Davis (7–8)	O. Hernandez (0–6)	—	The Ballpark in Arlington	34,940	74–52
127	August 22	@ Rangers	1–8	Oliver (10–8)	Mussina (12–11)	—	The Ballpark in Arlington	33,442	74–53
128	August 23	@ Rangers	5–2	Hitchock (5–3)	Bell (4–8)	Rivera (39)	The Ballpark in Arlington	36,158	75–53
129	August 24	@ Angels	2–6	Hasegawa (4–4)	Pettitte (14–8)	—	Edison International Field of Anaheim	43,489	75–54
130	August 25	@ Angels	7–5	Clemens (17–1)	Valdez (8–8)	Rivera (40)	Edison International Field of Anaheim	43,398	76–54
131	August 26	@ Angels	6–7 (10)	Percival (4–2)	Stanton (8–4)	—	Edison International Field of Anaheim	41,660	76–55
132	August 28	Blue Jays	4–0	Mussina (13–11)	Loaiza (9–11)	Rivera (41)	Yankee Stadium	37,450	77–55
133	August 29	Blue Jays	2–3	Halladay (3–1)	Hitchock (5–4)	Koch (30)	Yankee Stadium	36,855	77–56
134	August 30	Blue Jays	5–4 (11)	Witasick (8–2)	Eyre (0–1)	—	Yankee Stadium	42,537	78–56
135	August 31	@ Red Sox	3–1	Clemens (18–1)	Lowe (4–10)	Rivera (42)	Yankee Stadium	33,501	79–56

September (12–6) Home: 5–2 Away: 7–4

#	Date	Opponent	Score	Win	Loss	Save	Location	Attendance	Record
136	September 1	@ Red Sox	2–1	O. Hernandez (1–6)	Urbina (2–2)	Rivera (43)	Fenway Park	33,084	80–56
137	September 2	@ Red Sox	1–0	Mussina (14–11)	Cone (8–4)	—	Fenway Park	33,734	81–56
138	September 3	@ Blue Jays	7–5	Wohlers (4–1)	Koch (2–5)	Mendoza (6)	SkyDome	28,404	82–56
139	September 4	@ Blue Jays	0–14	Carpenter (9–11)	Pettitte (14–9)	—	SkyDome	20,036	82–57
140	September 5	@ Blue Jays	4–3	Clemens (19–1)	Escobar (6–6)	Rivera (44)	SkyDome	29,235	83–57
141	September 7	Red Sox	3–2	O. Hernandez (2–6)	Martinez (7–3)	Rivera (45)	Yankee Stadium	55,524	84–57
142	September 8	Red Sox	9–2	Mussina (15–11)	Cone (8–5)	—	Yankee Stadium	55,316	85–57
143	September 9	Red Sox	7–2	Pettitte (15–9)	Nomo (11–8)	—	Yankee Stadium	55,318	86–57
–	September 10	Red Sox	Cancelled (rain)						
–	September 11	White Sox	Postponed (9/11 attacks) Rescheduled for October 1						
–	September 12	White Sox	Postponed (9/11 attacks) Rescheduled for October 2						
–	September 13	White Sox	Postponed (9/11 attacks) Rescheduled for October 3						
–	September 14	@ Devil Rays	Postponed (9/11 attacks) Rescheduled for October 4						
–	September 15	@ Devil Rays	Postponed (9/11 attacks) Rescheduled for October 5						
–	September 16	@ Devil Rays	Postponed (9/11 attacks) Rescheduled for October 6						
–	September 17	@ Devil Rays	Postponed (9/11 attacks) Rescheduled for October 7						
144	September 18	@ White Sox	11–3	O. Hernandez (3–6)	Buehrle (13–8)	—	Comiskey Park	22,785	87–57
145	September 19	@ White Sox	6–3	Clemens (20–1)	Glover (4–3)	Rivera (46)	Comiskey Park	18,465	88–57
146	September 20	@ White Sox	5–7	Lowe (8–4)	Pettitte (15–10)	Foulke (39)	Comiskey Park	22,284	88–58
147	September 21	@ Orioles	6–7	Roberts (8–9)	Rivera (4–6)	—	Oriole Park at Camden Yards	47,099	88–59
148	September 22	@ Orioles	2–11	Douglass (1–1)	Hitchock (5–5)	—	Oriole Park at Camden Yards	47,068	88–60
149	September 23	@ Orioles	5–4 (10)	Stanton (9–4)	Parrish (1–2)	Rivera (47)	Oriole Park at Camden Yards	46,071	89–60
150	September 25	Devil Rays	0–4	Sturtze (9–12)	Clemens (20–2)	—	Yankee Stadium	33,777	89–61
151	September 26	Devil Rays	5–1	Lilly (4–6)	Wilson (7–9)	—	Yankee Stadium	23,352	90–61
152	September 28	Orioles	7–0	Mussina (16–11)	Johnson (10–12)	—	Yankee Stadium	42,066	91–61
153	September 29	Orioles	2–7	Maduro (5–6)	O. Hernandez (3–7)	—	Yankee Stadium	55,310	91–62
154	September 30	Orioles	1–1 (15)	Game called (rain) (game was not made up, tie does not count in record)			Yankee Stadium	55,351	91–62

October (4–3) Home: 3–0 Away: 1–3

#	Date	Opponent	Score	Win	Loss	Save	Location	Attendance	Record
155	October 1	White Sox	8–1	Hitchock (6–5)	Wells (10–10)	—	Yankee Stadium	8,112	92–62
156	October 2	White Sox	6–4	Lilly (5–6)	Wright (5–3)	Rivera (48)	Yankee Stadium	10,480	93–62
157	October 3	White Sox	2–1	Mussina (17–11)	Garland (6–7)	Rivera (49)	Yankee Stadium	14,895	94–62
158	October 4	@ Devil Rays	1–4	Bierbrodt (5–6)	A. Hernandez (0–3)	Yan (21)	Tropicana Field	15,265	94–63
159	October 5	@ Devil Rays	4–8	Kennedy (7–8)	Clemens (20–3)	Zambrano (2)	Tropicana Field	22,028	94–64
160	October 6	@ Devil Rays	2–5	Sturtze (11–12)	Mendoza (8–4)	Yan (22)	Tropicana Field	25,511	94–65
161	October 7	@ Devil Rays	1–0	O. Hernandez (4–7)	Colome (2–3)	Rivera (50)	Tropicana Field	24,075	95–65

=== Postseason ===
Legend
Yankees Win	Yankees Loss	Game postponed

2001 Postseason Game Log (10–7)
ALDS vs Athletics (3–2)

#	Date	Opponent	Score	Win	Loss	Save	Location	Attendance	Record
1	October 10	Athletics	3–5	Mulder (1–0)	Clemens (0–1)	Isringhausen (1)	Yankee Stadium	56,697	0–1
2	October 11	Athletics	0–2	Hudson (1–0)	Pettitte (0–1)	Isringhausen (2)	Yankee Stadium	56,684	0–2
3	October 13	@ Athletics	1–0	Mussina (1–0)	Zito (0–1)	Rivera (1)	Network Associates Coliseum	55,861	1–2
4	October 14	@ Athletics	9–2	Hernandez (1–0)	Lidle (0–1)		Network Associates Coliseum	43,681	2–2
5	October 15	Athletics	5–3	Stanton (1–0)	Mulder (1–1)	Rivera (2)	Yankee Stadium	56,642	3–2

ALCS vs Mariners (4–1)

#	Date	Opponent	Score	Win	Loss	Save	Location	Attendance	Record
1	October 17	@ Mariners	4–2	Pettitte (1–0)	Sele (0–1)	Rivera (1)	Safeco Field	47,644	1–0
2	October 18	@ Mariners	3–2	Mussina (1–0)	Garcia (0–1)	Rivera (2)	Safeco Field	47,791	2–0
3	October 20	Mariners	3–14	Moyer (1–0)	Hernandez (0–1)		Yankee Stadium	56,517	2–1
4	October 21	Mariners	3–1	Rivera (1–0)	Sasaki (0–1)		Yankee Stadium	56,375	3–1
5	October 22	Mariners	12–3	Pettitte (2–0)	Sele (0–2)		Yankee Stadium	56,370	4–1

WS vs Diamondbacks (3–4)

#	Date	Opponent	Score	Win	Loss	Save	Location	Attendance	Record
1	October 27	@ Diamondbacks	1–9	Schilling (1–0)	Mussina (0–1)		Bank One Ballpark	49,646	0–1
2	October 28	@ Diamondbacks	0–4	Johnson (1–0)	Pettitte (0–1)		Bank One Ballpark	49,646	0–2
3	October 30	Diamondbacks	2–1	Clemens (1–0)	Anderson (0–1)	Rivera (1)	Yankee Stadium	55,820	1–2
4	October 31	Diamondbacks	4–3 (10)	Rivera (1–0)	Kim (0–1)		Yankee Stadium	55,863	2–2
5	November 1	Diamondbacks	3–2 (12)	Hitchcock (1–0)	Lopez (0–1)		Yankee Stadium	56,018	3–2
6	November 3	@ Diamondbacks	2–15	Johnson (2–0)	Pettitte (0–2)		Bank One Ballpark	49,707	3–3
7	November 4	@ Diamondbacks	2–3	Johnson (3–0)	Rivera (1–1)		Bank One Ballpark	49,589	3–4

== Player stats ==
= Indicates team leader

=== Batting ===
Note: G = Games played; AB = At bats; R = Runs; H = Hits; HR = Home runs; RBI = Runs batted in; Avg. = Batting average; SB = Stolen bases

Pos.	Player	G	AB	R	H	HR	RBI	Avg.	SB
C	Jorge Posada	138	484	59	134	22	95	.277	2
1B	Tino Martinez	154	589	89	165	34	113	.280	1
2B	Alfonso Soriano	158	574	77	154	18	73	.268	43
3B	Scott Brosius	120	428	57	123	13	49	.287	3
SS	Derek Jeter	150	614	110	191	21	74	.311	27
LF	Chuck Knoblauch	137	521	66	130	9	44	.250	38
CF	Bernie Williams	146	540	102	166	26	94	.307	11
RF	Paul O'Neill	137	510	77	136	21	70	.267	22
DH	David Justice	111	381	58	92	18	51	.241	1

==== Other batters ====
Note: G = Games played; AB = At bats; R = Runs; H = Hits; HR = Home runs; RBI = Runs batted in; Avg. = Batting average; SB = Stolen bases

Player	G	AB	R	H	HR	RBI	Avg.	SB
Erick Almonte	8	4	0	2	0	0	.500	2
Clay Bellinger	51	81	12	13	5	12	.160	1
Darren Bragg	5	4	1	1	0	0	.250	0
Michael Coleman	12	38	5	8	1	7	.211	0
Bobby Estalella	3	4	1	0	0	0	.000	0
Todd Greene	35	96	9	20	1	11	.208	0
Nick Johnson	23	67	6	13	2	8	.194	0
Donzell McDonald	5	3	0	1	0	0	.333	0
Joe Oliver	12	36	3	9	1	2	.250	0
Robert Pérez	6	15	1	4	0	0	.267	0
Juan Rivera	3	4	0	0	0	0	.000	0
Henry Rodríguez	5	8	0	0	0	0	.000	0
Scott Seabol	1	1	0	0	0	0	.000	0
Luis Sojo	39	79	5	13	0	9	.165	1
Shane Spencer	80	283	40	73	10	46	.258	4
Randy Velarde	15	46	4	7	0	1	.152	2
Gerald Williams	38	47	12	8	0	2	.170	3
Enrique Wilson	48	99	10	24	1	12	.242	0

=== Starting pitchers ===
Note: G = Games pitched; IP = Innings pitched; W = Wins; L = Losses; ERA = Earned run average; CG = Complete games; SO = Strikeouts; BB = Walks allowed

Player	G	IP	W	L	ERA	CG	SO	BB
Mike Mussina	34	228.2	17	11	3.15	4	214	42
Roger Clemens	33	220.1	20	3	3.51	0	213	72
Andy Pettitte	31	200.2	15	10	3.99	2	164	41
Ted Lilly	26	120.2	5	6	5.37	0	112	51
Orlando Hernández	17	94.2	4	7	4.85	0	77	42
Randy Keisler	10	50.2	1	2	6.22	0	36	34
Sterling Hitchcock	10	51.1	4	4	6.49	1	28	18
Christian Parker	1	3.0	0	1	21.00	0	1	1
Brett Jodie	1	2.0	0	1	27.00	0	0	1

==== Other pitchers ====
Note: G = Games pitched; IP = Innings pitched; W = Wins; L = Losses; ERA = Earned run average; SO = Strikeouts

Player	G	IP	W	L	ERA	SO
Adrián Hernández	6	22.0	0	3	3.68	10

===== Relief pitchers =====
Note: G = Games pitched; IP = Innings pitched; W = Wins; L = Losses; SV = Saves; ERA = Earned run average; SO = Strikeouts; BB = Walks allowed

Player	G	IP	W	L	SV	ERA	SO	BB
Mariano Rivera	71	80.2	4	6	50	2.34	83	12
Mike Stanton	76	80.1	9	4	0	2.58	78	29
Ramiro Mendoza	56	100.2	8	4	6	3.75	70	23
Randy Choate	37	48.1	3	1	0	3.35	35	27
Jay Witasick	32	40.1	3	0	0	4.69	53	18
Mark Wohlers	31	35.2	1	0	0	4.54	33	18
Brian Boehringer	22	34.2	0	1	1	3.12	33	12
Todd Williams	15	15.1	1	0	0	4.70	13	9
Carlos Almanzar	10	10.2	0	1	0	3.38	6	2
Brandon Knight	4	10.2	0	0	0	10.13	7	3

== ALDS ==
Series Summary:

- Game 1 @ Yankee Stadium: Athletics 5, Yankees 3
- Game 2 @ Yankee Stadium: Athletics 2, Yankees 0
- Game 3 @ Network Associates Coliseum: Yankees 1, Athletics 0
- Game 4 @ Network Associates Coliseum: Yankees 9, Athletics 2
- Game 5 @ Yankee Stadium: Yankees 5, Athletics 3

Yankees win series 3–2, becoming the first team in MLB history to win the ALDS after dropping the first two games at home.

== ALCS ==
Game	Score	Date	Location	Attendance
1	New York – 4, Seattle – 2	October 17	Safeco Field	47,644
2	New York – 3, Seattle – 2	October 18	Safeco Field	47,791
3	Seattle – 14, New York – 3	October 20	Yankee Stadium	56,517
4	Seattle – 1, New York – 3	October 21	Yankee Stadium	56,375
5	Seattle – 3, New York – 12	October 22	Yankee Stadium	56,370

== World Series ==
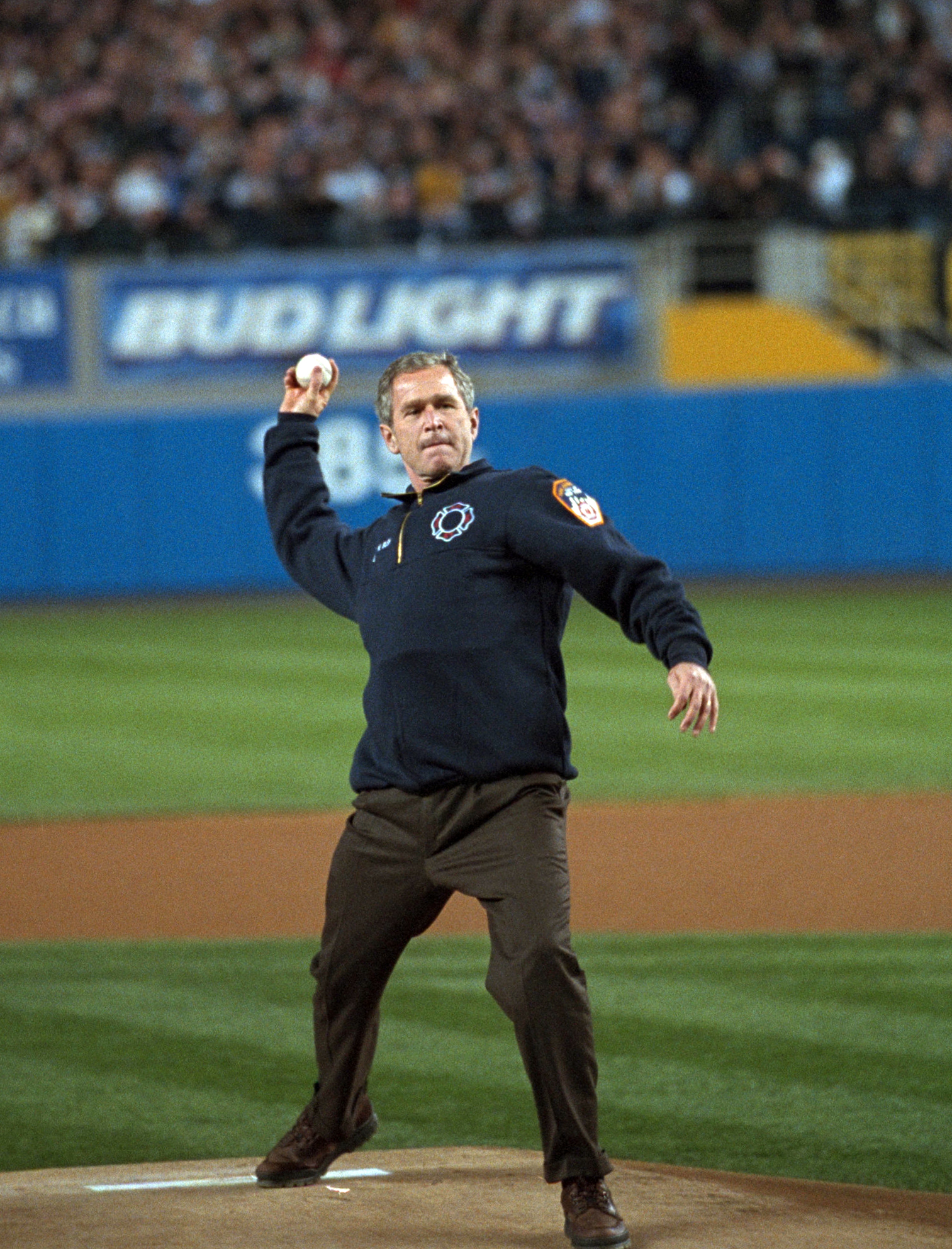
President Bush tosses out the ceremonial first pitch before a 2-1 Yankee victory in Game 3 of the 2001 World Series.

=== Game 1 ===
October 27, 2001 at Bank One Ballpark in Phoenix, Arizona

Team	1	2	3	4	5	6	7	8	9	R	H	E
New York	1	0	0	0	0	0	0	0	0	1	3	2
Arizona	1	0	4	4	0	0	0	0	x	9	10	0
W: Curt Schilling (1–0) L: Mike Mussina (0–1)
HR: ARI – Craig Counsell (1), Luis Gonzalez (1)

=== Game 2 ===
October 28, 2001 at Bank One Ballpark in Phoenix, Arizona

Team	1	2	3	4	5	6	7	8	9	R	H	E
New York	0	0	0	0	0	0	0	0	0	0	3	0
Arizona	0	1	0	0	0	0	3	0	x	4	5	0
W: Randy Johnson (1–0) L: Andy Pettitte (0–1)
HR: ARI – Matt Williams (1)

=== Game 3 ===
October 30, 2001 at Yankee Stadium in New York City

Team	1	2	3	4	5	6	7	8	9	R	H	E
Arizona	0	0	0	1	0	0	0	0	0	1	3	3
New York	0	1	0	0	0	1	0	0	x	2	7	1
W: Roger Clemens (1–0) L: Brian Anderson (0–1) S: Mariano Rivera (1)
HR: NYY – Jorge Posada (1)

=== Game 4 ===
October 31, 2001 at Yankee Stadium in New York City

Team	1	2	3	4	5	6	7	8	9	10	R	H	E
Arizona	0	0	0	1	0	0	0	2	0	0	3	6	0
New York	0	0	1	0	0	0	0	0	2	1	4	7	0
W: Mariano Rivera (1–0) L: Byung-hyun Kim (0–1)
HR: ARI – Mark Grace (1) NYY – Shane Spencer (1), Tino Martinez (1), Derek Jeter (1)

=== Game 5 ===
November 1, 2001 at Yankee Stadium in New York City

Team	1	2	3	4	5	6	7	8	9	10	11	12	R	H	E
Arizona	0	0	0	0	2	0	0	0	0	0	0	0	2	8	0
New York	0	0	0	0	0	0	0	0	2	0	0	1	3	9	1
W: Sterling Hitchcock (1–0) L: Albie Lopez (0–1)
HR: ARI – Steve Finley (1), Rod Barajas (1) NYY – Scott Brosius (1)

=== Game 6 ===
November 3, 2001 at Bank One Ballpark in Phoenix, Arizona

Team	1	2	3	4	5	6	7	8	9	R	H	E
New York	0	0	0	0	0	2	0	0	0	2	7	1
Arizona	1	3	8	3	0	0	0	0	x	15	22	0
W: Randy Johnson (2–0) L: Andy Pettitte (0–2)

=== Game 7 ===
November 4, 2001 at Bank One Ballpark in Phoenix, Arizona

Team	1	2	3	4	5	6	7	8	9	R	H	E
New York	0	0	0	0	0	0	1	1	0	2	6	3
Arizona	0	0	0	0	0	1	0	0	2	3	11	0
W: Randy Johnson (3–0) L: Mariano Rivera (1-1)
HR: NYY– Alfonso Soriano (1)

== Awards and records ==
- Roger Clemens became the first pitcher to reach his 20th win with only 1 loss.
- Roger Clemens, AL Cy Young Award

== Farm system ==
Level	Team	League	Manager
AAA	Columbus Clippers	International League	Trey Hillman
AA	Norwich Navigators	Eastern League	Stump Merrill
A	Tampa Yankees	Florida State League	Brian Butterfield
A	Greensboro Bats	South Atlantic League	Mitch Seoane
A-Short Season	Staten Island Yankees	New York–Penn League	Joe Arnold
Rookie	GCL Yankees	Gulf Coast League	Derek Shelton

LEAGUE CHAMPIONS: GCL Yankees; LEAGUE CO-CHAMPIONS: Tampa
