= Dairylea =

Dairylea may refer to:

- Dairylea (cheese), a brand of cheese products produced by Mondelēz International in the UK and Ireland
- Dairylea Cooperative Inc., a large, regional milk cooperative located in Syracuse NY, USA
- Dairylea Lunchables
