= Todd Williams =

American baseball player (born 1971)

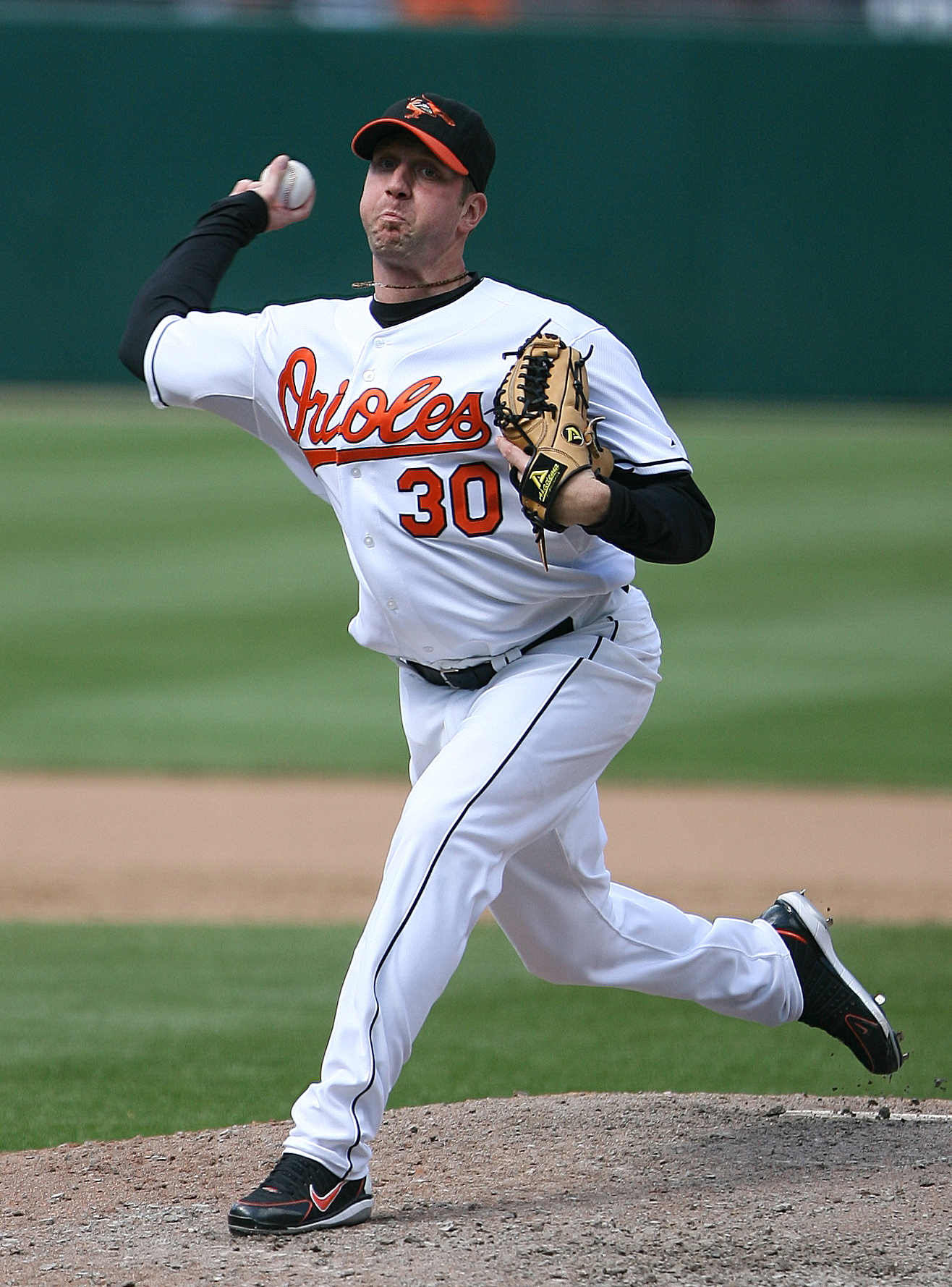
- Williams pitching for the Baltimore Orioles in 2007
- Pitcher
- Born: February 13, 1971 (age 55); Syracuse, New York, U.S.
- Batted: Right Threw: Right

MLB debut
- April 29, 1995, for the Los Angeles Dodgers

Last MLB appearance
- June 15, 2007, for the Baltimore Orioles

MLB statistics
- Win–loss record: 12–14
- Earned run average: 4.33
- Strikeouts: 116
- Stats at Baseball Reference

Teams
- Los Angeles Dodgers (1995); Cincinnati Reds (1998); Seattle Mariners (1999); New York Yankees (2001); Baltimore Orioles (2004–2007)
Medals
Men's baseball
Representing United States
Pan American Games
Silver medal – second place	1999 Winnipeg	Team
Olympic Games
Gold medal – first place	2000 Sydney	Team

Todd Michael Williams (born February 13, 1971) is an American former professional baseball relief pitcher. He attended East Syracuse-Minoa High School graduating in 1989. He then attended Onondaga Community College before signing a professional baseball contract with the Los Angeles Dodgers of the Major League Baseball (MLB) in 1991. Over the course of his professional career Williams played for 10 different organizations, including all or parts of eight seasons in the Major Leagues. He is a retired 18-year professional baseball player, with eight years of Major League Baseball experience. Williams was also a member of the USA Baseball team three separate years, with the highlight of winning a Gold Medal in the 2000 Summer Olympics held in Sydney, Australia.

Williams, who retired from baseball after the 2008 season, holds the all-time Minor League Baseball record for saves with 223, compiled during an 18-year professional career. A four-time Triple-A All-Star Game participant, Williams also holds the record for most career appearances by a professional member of Team USA.

Williams served as bullpen closer for the 2000 United States Olympic Baseball Team during the Sydney, Australia Summer Games. That squad was the lone USA baseball team to win an Olympic gold medal during the span (1988–2008) when baseball was an Olympic medal sport. Williams was a member of the 2001 American League Champion New York Yankees.

== Early life ==
Williams graduated from East Syracuse-Minoa High School in 1989. He was a two-sport athlete lettering in basketball and baseball. He received all league honors in 1988 for baseball and in '89 was a sectional all-star for the O.H.S.L Champion Spartan baseball team. A three-year member of the Varsity Baseball team, recording an earned run average of a 2.19 in 1987, 2.10 in 1988 and 2.13 in 1989 while holding a .354 batting average his senior year of 1989.

== Amateur career ==
Williams attended Onondaga Community College. In his 1990 season Williams received the Student–Athlete of the year award and was drafted by the Los Angeles Dodgers in the 54th round of the 1990 Amateur Draft.

Williams elected to play his 1991 season at Onondaga Community College and was selected to the first team all-region all-star team as well as sharing the Kelly J Dwyer Award (MVP) with teammate Marc Grande. Williams finished 8th in the Nation in E.R.A (1.14), and as of '91 was 7th in all-time leaders in E.R.A. (1.76). In 1990 Onondaga ranked 20th in the nation as a team. Onondaga ranked 3rd nationally in hitting with a .369 batting average, finished with the 4th best winning percentage in the country in '90 going 25-3 .893% and in '91 finished with the 5th best winning percentage in the country going 29–5. Williams then signed with the Los Angeles Dodgers before the 1991 draft.

== Professional career ==
=== Los Angeles Dodgers ===
Williams moved up the Dodgers ladder quickly, making it from short-season Great Falls in 1991 to Triple A Albuquerque by 1993, and made his big-league debut for the Los Angeles Dodgers on April 29, 1995, against the Atlanta Braves, retiring all three batters he faced.

=== Oakland Athletics ===
He was traded to the Oakland Athletics four months later, on Sept, 8, 1995, spending the 1996 season at Triple-A Edmonton where he was used in varied roles, including making 10 of what would be just 12 career starts.

=== Baltimore Orioles ===
Over the next eight seasons, Williams would play for six more organizations – Cincinnati Reds (1997–99), Seattle Mariners (1999–2000), the New York Yankees (2001), Montreal Expos (2002), Tampa Bay Rays (2003) and Texas Rangers (2004), seeing some big league time with the Reds (six games in 1998), Mariners (13 games in 1999) and Yankees (15 games in 2001) before signing with the Baltimore Orioles on June 23, 2004.

He would spend the next four years with the Orioles, including all of 2005 and most of 2006 in the big leagues. After posting a 2.87 ERA in 29 games with the Orioles in 2004, Williams made the club out of spring training in '05. In 72 games (eighth in the American League), he posted a 3.30 ERA, including his first Major League save, which came on August 19 in a 5–3 win against the Oakland Athletics.

Williams notched one more save in the majors with the Orioles in 2006 after posting a 4.74 ERA in 62 games. Williams struggled after sustaining an injury in 2007. He went on to post a 7.53 ERA in 14 games. Williams was subsequently released by the Orioles on June 17 of that year.

=== Minor League ===
He finished the '07 season with the Colorado Rockies organization, pitching at Double-A Tulsa and Triple-A Colorado Springs before becoming a minor league free agent.

Williams finished his playing career in 2008 with the Long Island Ducks of the Independent Atlantic League with a 2.68 ERA in 37 games and eight saves, which do not count towards his record-breaking total.

=== Professional career transactions ===
- June 4, 1990: Drafted by the Los Angeles Dodgers in the 54th round of the 1990 amateur draft. Player signed May 21, 1991.
- September 8, 1995: Traded by the Los Angeles Dodgers to the Oakland Athletics for Matt McDonald (minors).
- January 16, 1997: Released by the Oakland Athletics.
- February 3, 1997: Signed as a Free Agent with the Cincinnati Reds.
- July 22, 1999: Traded by the Cincinnati Reds to the Seattle Mariners for Kerry Robinson.
- November 16, 2000: Released by the Seattle Mariners.
- January 3, 2001: Signed as a Free Agent with the New York Yankees.
- October 12, 2001: Granted Free Agency.
- December 27, 2001: Signed as a Free Agent with the Los Angeles Dodgers.
- March 26, 2002: Released by the Los Angeles Dodgers.
- May 3, 2002: Signed as a Free Agent with the Montreal Expos.
- October 15, 2002: Granted Free Agency.
- December 23, 2002: Signed as a Free Agent with the Tampa Bay Devil Rays.
- October 15, 2003: Granted Free Agency.
- December 8, 2003: Signed as a Free Agent with the Texas Rangers.
- June 14, 2004: Released by the Texas Rangers.
- June 23, 2004: Signed as a Free Agent with the Baltimore Orioles.
- June 16, 2007: Released by the Baltimore Orioles.
- August 3, 2007: Signed as a Free Agent with the Colorado Rockies.
- October 29, 2007: Granted Free Agency.

== Career awards and accomplishments ==
- East Syracuse –Minoa High School All-League Honors 1988
- ESM O.H.S.L Championship 1989
- ESM Sectional All-Star in 1989
- ESM three year Varsity baseball E.R.A. 1987 (2.19) 1988 (2.10) 1989 (2.13)
- Onondaga Community College Student Athlete of the Year Award 1991
- First team Junior College All –Region All Star team 1991
- Ranked 8th Nationally in Junior College E.R.A 1991 (1.14)
- Named to the Onondaga Community College Hall of Fame in 2005
- Drafted by the Los Angeles Dodgers 1990
- Los Angeles Dodgers Minor League Pitcher of the Year 1992
- Three time AAA Championships. Albuquerque 1994, Edmonton 1996, Durham 2003
- Inaugural Arizona Fall League Championship Team 1992
- Dominican League Championship 1994. La Romana
- Four time AAA All Star Team 1993, 1998, 1999, 2000
- Rolaids Minor League Relief Pitcher of the Year 1993, 1997, 1998, 2000
- The all- time career Minor League Saves Leader (223 saves)
- 18 years of Professional Baseball experience
- 10 Major League organizations: Los Angeles Dodgers, Oakland A's, Cincinnati Reds, Seattle Mariners, N.Y. Yankees, Montreal Expos, Tampa Bay Rays, Texas Rangers, Baltimore Orioles, Colorado Rockies
- Major League debut April 29, 1995 (Los Angeles Dodgers)
- 8 Major League Baseball seasons; Los Angeles Dodgers 1995, Cincinnati Reds 1998, Seattle Mariners 1999, A.L. Champion New York Yankees 2001, Baltimore Orioles 2004–2007
- 1st Major League Save 2005. (Baltimore Orioles)
- Ranked 8th in the American League in appearances with 72 in 2005
- Led the Baltimore Orioles in appearances in a two-year span (134) 2005–2006
- MLB career totals: 227 games, 12–14 record, 4.33 ERA
- U.S.A. Baseball : Only player to be named to three professional teams for Team USA 1999, 2000, 2003
- U.S.A. Baseball Pan American Games Silver Medalist 1999 (Winnipeg, Canada)
- U.S.A. Baseball Olympic Gold Medalist 2000 (Sydney, Australia)
- U.S.A. Baseball Olympic Qualifying Team 2003 (Panama City, Panama)

== Personal life ==
Since retiring, Williams lives in Tampa, FL, with his sons Trey and Trevor and daughter Ally-Reese. He has been active in the youth sports area in both his current community as well as his hometown of Syracuse, NY, serving as volunteer coach in baseball, basketball and football doing youth-oriented charity work. He has organized the following:

- AAU Baseball coach
- Little League Baseball coach
- YMCA Basketball coach
- AAU Basketball coach
- Pop Warner Football coach
- Let it Fly flag football tournament coach
- Held clinics for High School Coaches
- Held baseball clinics, Little League, AAU baseball, High School and College
- Work with individuals and teams, teaching fundamentals and mental preparation
- Donates his time to several charities and fundraisers

On December 13, 2007, Williams was one of many athletes mentioned in the detailed Mitchell Report by Senator George Mitchell. Kirk Radomski claimed he sold Winstrol to Williams once in 2001. Todd Williams – Page 194 (242). There was no corroborating evidence mentioned.

== See also ==
- List of Major League Baseball players named in the Mitchell Report
