= East Syracuse, New York =

Village in New York, United States

- Village
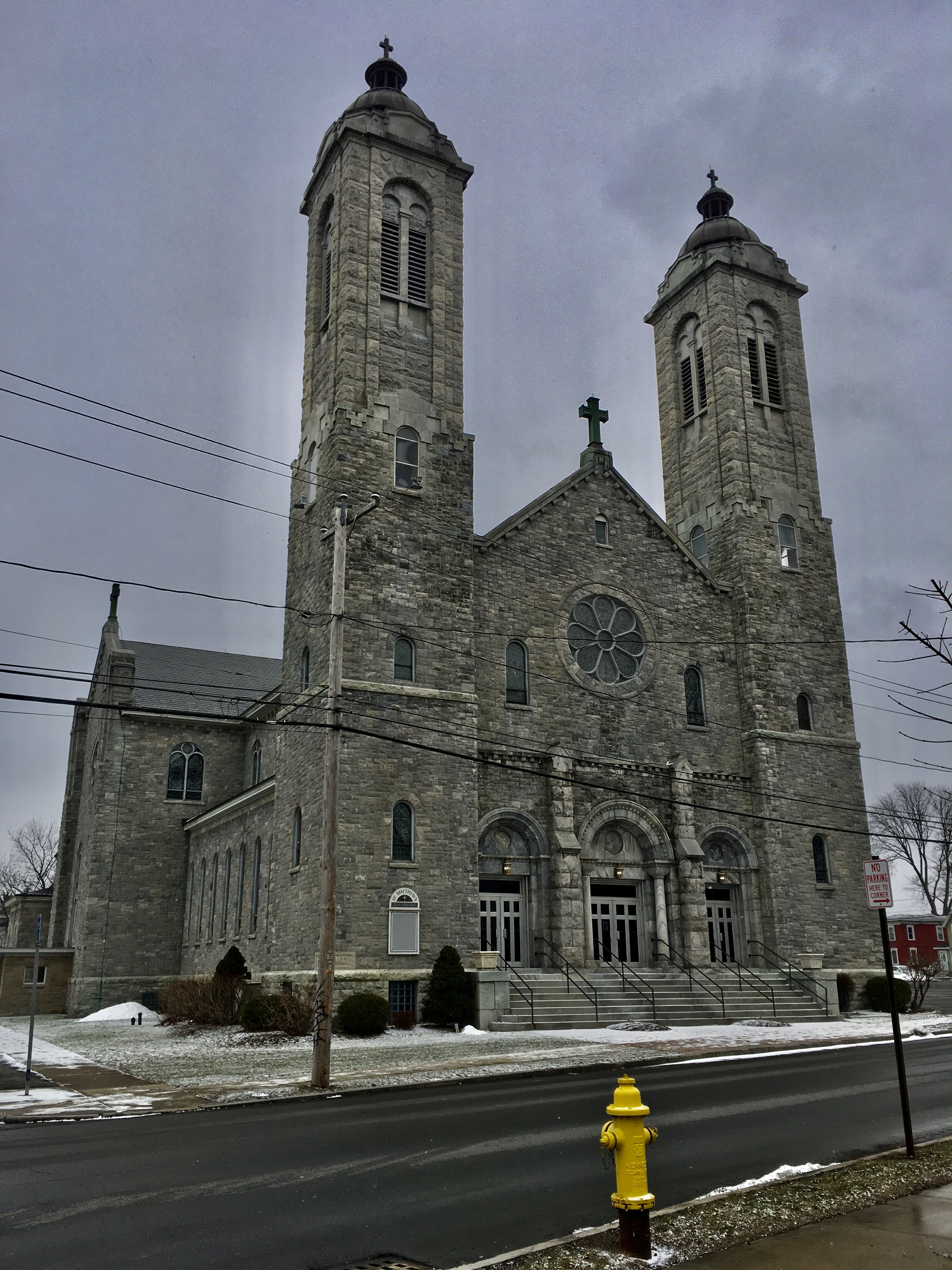
- St. Matthew's Roman Catholic Church, 2021

- Seal

- Location in Onondaga County and the state of New York.
- Coordinates: 43°3′52″N 76°4′13″W
- Country: United States
- State: New York
- County: Onondaga

Government
  - Mayor: Lorene Dadey (D)

Area
  - Total: 1.56 sq mi (4.04 km^{2})
  - Land: 1.56 sq mi (4.04 km^{2})
  - Water: 0 sq mi (0.00 km^{2})
- Elevation: 433 ft (132 m)

Population (2020)
  - Total: 3,078
  - Density: 1,973.4/sq mi (761.95/km^{2})
- Time zone: UTC-5 (Eastern (EST))
  - Summer (DST): UTC-4 (EDT)
- ZIP code: 13057
- Area code: 315
- FIPS code: 36-23052
- GNIS feature ID: 0949253
- Website: www.villageofeastsyracuse.gov

East Syracuse is an incorporated village and a suburb of the City of Syracuse in eastern Onondaga County, New York, United States. As of the 2020 census, the population was 3,078. It is located immediately east of Syracuse, in the town of DeWitt.

== Geography ==
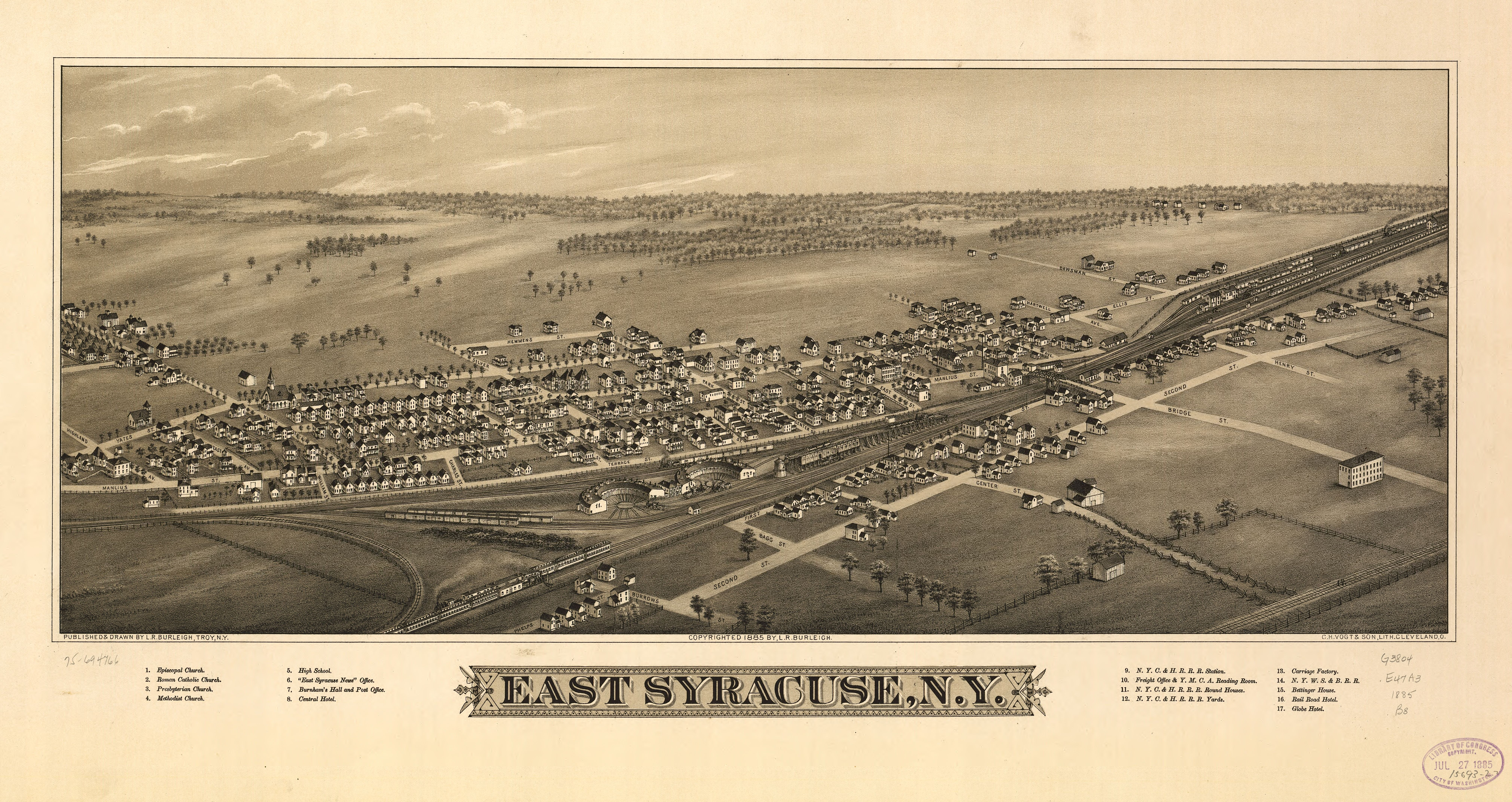
Perspective map of East Syracuse with a list of landmarks from 1885 by L.R. Burleigh

East Syracuse is located at 43°3′52″N 76°4′13″W (43.064516, -76.070143). The village center is at Manlius and North Center streets.

According to the United States Census Bureau, the village has a total area of 1.6 square miles (4.1 km^{2}), all land.

== Demographics ==
Historical population
Census	Pop.	Note	%±
1880	1,099		—
1890	2,231		103.0%
1900	2,509		12.5%
1910	3,274		30.5%
1920	4,106		25.4%
1930	4,646		13.2%
1940	4,520		−2.7%
1950	4,706		4.1%
1960	4,708		0.0%
1970	4,333		−8.0%
1980	3,412		−21.3%
1990	3,343		−2.0%
2000	3,178		−4.9%
2010	3,084		−3.0%
2020	3,078		−0.2%
U.S. Decennial Census

=== Racial and ethnic composition ===
East Syracuse village, New York – racial and ethnic composition Note: the US Census treats Hispanic/Latino as an ethnic category. This table excludes Latinos from the racial categories and assigns them to a separate category. Hispanics/Latinos may be of any race.
Race / Ethnicity (NH = Non-Hispanic)	2020	2010	2000	1990	1980
White alone (NH)	77.1% (2,373)	88.7% (2,735)	94.2% (2,995)	97.5% (3,260)	97.6% (3,331)
Black alone (NH)	7.3% (225)	3% (93)	1.3% (42)	0.5% (17)	0.2% (7)
American Indian alone (NH)	1.1% (34)	0.9% (29)	1% (31)	0.8% (27)	0.6% (21)
Asian alone (NH)	1.3% (40)	0.7% (23)	0.3% (8)	0.4% (14)	0% (0)
Pacific Islander alone (NH)	0% (0)	0.1% (2)	0% (0)		
Other race alone (NH)	0.6% (20)	0.3% (9)	0% (0)	0% (0)	0% (0)
Multiracial (NH)	7.4% (228)	3.6% (112)	2% (65)	—	—
Hispanic/Latino (any race)	5.1% (158)	2.6% (81)	1.2% (37)	0.7% (25)	1.6% (53)

=== 2020 census ===
As of the 2020 census, East Syracuse had a population of 3,078. The median age was 38.0 years. 23.4% of residents were under the age of 18 and 15.8% of residents were 65 years of age or older. For every 100 females there were 98.2 males, and for every 100 females age 18 and over there were 91.9 males age 18 and over.

100.0% of residents lived in urban areas, while 0.0% lived in rural areas.

There were 1,406 households in East Syracuse, of which 28.0% had children under the age of 18 living in them. Of all households, 24.8% were married-couple households, 28.0% were households with a male householder and no spouse or partner present, and 36.7% were households with a female householder and no spouse or partner present. About 41.6% of all households were made up of individuals and 16.2% had someone living alone who was 65 years of age or older.

There were 1,538 housing units, of which 8.6% were vacant. The homeowner vacancy rate was 1.2% and the rental vacancy rate was 6.1%.

=== 2000 census ===
As of the census of 2000, there were 3,178 people, 1,393 households, and 742 families residing in the village. The population density was 2,015.0 inhabitants per square mile (778.0/km^{2}). There were 1,503 housing units at an average density of 953.0 per square mile (368.0/km^{2}). The racial makeup of the village was 95.06% White, 1.45% African American, 1.01% Native American, 0.25% Asian, 0.09% from other races, and 2.14% from two or more races. Hispanic or Latino of any race were 1.16% of the population.

There were 1,393 households, out of which 30.1% had children under the age of 18 living with them, 30.1% were married couples living together, 15.8% had a female householder with no husband present, and 46.7% were non-families. 40.2% of all households were made up of individuals, and 16.8% had someone living alone who was 65 years of age or older. The average household size was 2.28 and the average family size was 3.09.

In the village, the population was spread out, with 27.0% under the age of 18, 7.9% from 18 to 24, 30.4% from 25 to 44, 19.1% from 45 to 64, and 15.6% who were 65 years of age or older. The median age was 36 years. For every 100 females, there were 90.6 males. For every 100 females age 18 and over, there were 86.0 males.

The median income for a household in the village was $28,703, and the median income for a family was $34,293. Males had a median income of $34,405 versus $24,875 for females. The per capita income for the village was $17,066. About 14.3% of families and 14.7% of the population were below the poverty line, including 17.9% of those under age 18 and 11.4% of those age 65 or over.

=== Historical context ===
The village was incorporated in 1881 and population peaked in the early 1960s, with a 1960 census reported population of 4,708.

== History ==
The original inhabitants of the area were Onondaga clans, whose village was atop a hill on the eastern border of Onondaga territory along what is now Kinne St. An established trail ran down part of what is now James Street to Ley Creek where the Onondagas could travel by canoe to their capital along the northeast shore of Onondaga Lake. Portions of this Onondaga village dating from the early eighteenth century were uncovered in the 1930s when East Syracuse High School was being built on Kinne St near James St.

The current settlement, originally named "Messina," grew up along the northern edge of the Erie Canal across from Headson's Landing, a busy canal port with the only bridge to cross the canal east of downtown Syracuse for ten miles. In the middle of the nineteenth century the Messina Plank Road (now New York State Route 290) was built from Messina east to Manlius Center and the canal port there. Large venetian blind and buggy whip factories operated in Messina in the late nineteenth century.

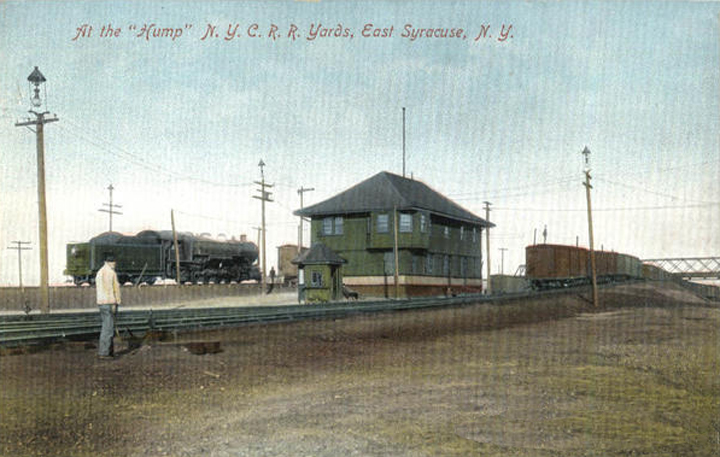
NYCRR freight yards at the 'hump' (1910).

In the 1870s, the main line of the New York Central Railroad was built through the northern part of Messina. The DeWitt Railyards complex, one of the busiest in the world in its day, stretched from Messina five miles east to Minoa. East and westbound trains were assembled in the yards at the "Hump", where trains were pushed up tracks on one side of an artificial hill and routed to their train by track switches as the rolled freely down the far side. During most of the nineteenth century the larger part of the hamlet was south of the railroad yards, but as the population grew with rail workers, housing expanded to the north.

During the boom following construction of the railroad, the name "East Syracuse" began to replace Messina. That name was chosen for the new village when it was incorporated in 1881. At that time the village thrived due to its access to transportation. The railroad was the new powerhouse, but the canal remained viable, with Headson's Landing still a busy port. The northeastern corner of the Headson's Landing Bridge was the original southwestern corner of the village.

In the 20th century, Erie Boulevard was built over the canal from west of Syracuse to about a mile past Headson's landing. In the 1960s, Interstate 690 was built through the southern part of the village between the railroad and Erie Blvd. Now only a small portion of the original settlement south of the railroad remains, including about 100 of the village's 1400 dwelling units.

With the canal gone and the railroad seeing only a portion of its former business, and as the interstate system and other high speed roads have turned the all-day trip of the nineteenth century into a few hours' drive, East Syracuse has become fully a suburb of Syracuse.

East Syracuse is home to Bristol Laboratories, formerly Cheplin Laboratories, which Bristol-Myers purchased in 1943 and converted from the production of acidophilus milk to penicillin until 2005 when it became more economical to produce overseas. Now a division of Bristol-Myers Squibb, the facility makes several newer drugs, along with housing a state-of-the-art ramp-up facility designed to quickly adapt to make moderate quantities of new drugs for clinical trials.

Jason M Rhoades became the village's youngest mayor at the age of twenty-five.

A recent list of the mayors of East Syracuse (with party affiliation) includes:

Michael "Mickey" Wrenn (Progressive) 1961-65;
Carl Sterling (Peoples) 1965-70;
Ronald A Russell Jr (Peoples) 1970-73, 1975-1979, 1981-1985, 1997-2001;
Fred Ray (Citizens) 1973-75;
Richard Benack (Citizens) 1979-81;
Richard Rhoades (Citizens) 1985-87;
Peter Higgins (Peoples) 1987-95;
Donald E Reichert (Citizens) 1995-97;
Jason M Rhoades (Citizens) 2001-03;
Lorene McCoy Dadey (Peoples) 2003-05;
Tony Albanese (Citizens) 2005-07;
Danny J Liedka (Peoples) 2007-2013;
Robert Tackman (Peoples) 2013-.

== Economy ==
The headquarters of Aspen Dental are in the Town of DeWitt near East Syracuse.

== Education ==
The East Syracuse-Minoa Central School District, which covers the majority of the village, is a public school system headquartered in the Town of Manlius, also including its surrounding area (Minoa, Kirkville, and the easternmost portion of Eastwood).

Small sections south of Interstate 690 are in the boundary of Jamesville-DeWitt Central School District.

Nearby private schools include Christian Brothers Academy, the Manlius Pebble Hill School, and Bishop Grimes Junior/Senior High School.

=== Elementary schools ===
- East Syracuse Elementary School
- Fremont Elementary School
- Minoa Elementary School
- Woodland Elementary School

=== Middle school ===
- Pine Grove Middle School

=== High school ===
- East Syracuse-Minoa Central High School

== Fire department ==
The Village of East Syracuse is protected by firefighters from the East Syracuse Volunteer Fire Department. Their fire station is located at 204 N Center Street on the corner of E Manlius Street.

== Public works ==
The East Syracuse Department of Public Works uses several late-model International dump trucks for plowing and other assorted tasks.

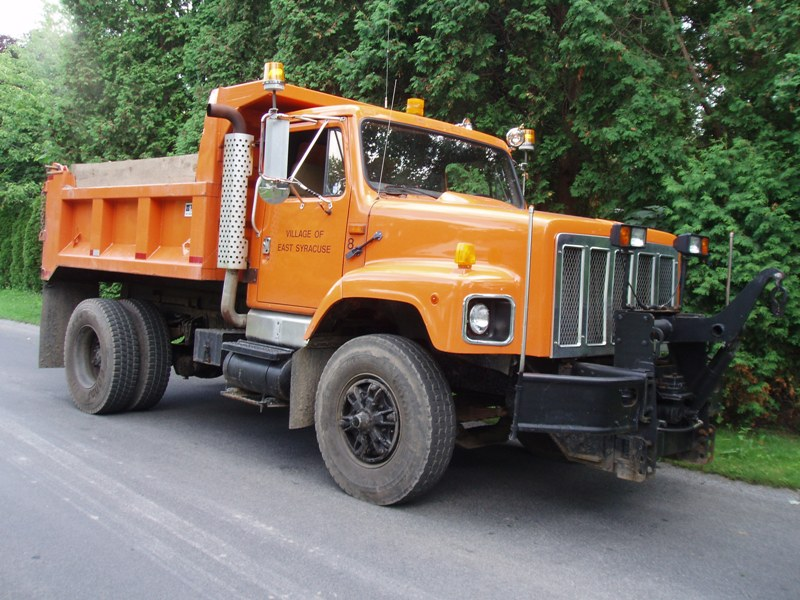
Village International DPW Plow truck at work site.

== Commerce ==
Manlius Street, typically referred to as Main Street, is home to a wide variety of locally owned shops, eating establishments, bars, manufacturers and other service providers.

Dairylea Cooperative Inc. is based in East Syracuse.

== Notable people ==
- Russ Brandon, president of the XFL; former president of the Buffalo Bills and Buffalo Sabres
- Jennifer Diederich, fashion designer and contestant in the reality series Project Runway on Bravo
- Tom Kenny, actor and comedian; best known for voicing SpongeBob SquarePants
- Bobcat Goldthwait, director, comedian and actor.

== See also ==
- Eastwood, Syracuse
