= Brandon Knight (baseball) =

American baseball player (born 1975)

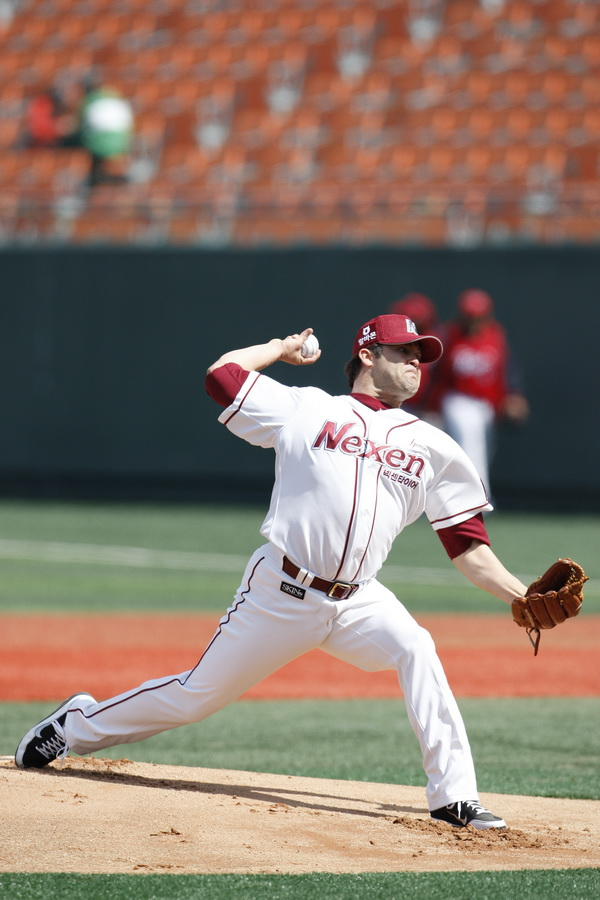

Kiwoom Heroes – No. 24
- Pitcher
- Born: October 1, 1975 (age 50); Oxnard, California, U.S.
- Batted: Left Threw: Right

Professional debut
- MLB: June 5, 2001, for the New York Yankees
- NPB: March 29, 2003, for the Fukuoka Daiei Hawks
- KBO: August 1, 2009, for the Nexen Heroes

Last appearance
- NPB: August 31, 2005, for the Hokkaido Nippon Ham Fighters
- MLB: September 18, 2008, for the New York Mets
- KBO: May 6, 2014, for the Nexen Heroes

MLB statistics
- Win–loss record: 1-0
- Earned run average: 8.62
- Strikeouts: 24

NPB statistics
- Win–loss record: 6-6
- Earned run average: 5.95
- Strikeouts: 96

KBO statistics
- Win–loss record: 48-38
- Earned run average: 3.84
- Strikeouts: 591
- Stats at Baseball Reference

Teams
- As player: New York Yankees (2001–2002); Fukuoka Daiei Hawks (2003–2004); Hokkaido Nippon Ham Fighters (2005); New York Mets (2008); Samsung Lions (2009–2010); Nexen Heroes (2011–2014); As coach: Hwaseong Heroes Pitching Coordinator (2015–2017); Nexen Heroes Pitching Coach (2017–2018); Kiwoom Heroes Pitching Coach (2019–present)
Medals
Men's baseball
Representing United States
Olympic Games
Bronze medal – third place	2008 Beijing	Team

Brandon Michael Knight (born October 1, 1975) is an American professional baseball pitcher and coach. Knight played Major League Baseball for the New York Yankees and the New York Mets, Nippon Professional Baseball for the Fukuoka Daiei Hawks and the Hokkaido Nippon Ham Fighters, and in the KBO League for the Nexen Heroes. He is the current pitching coach for the Kiwoom Heroes of the KBO.

== Professional ==
=== American baseball ===
Knight, who was selected by the Texas Rangers in the 1995 amateur draft, was traded by the Rangers to the New York Yankees on December 13, 1999, with pitcher Sam Marsonek for outfielder Chad Curtis, and appeared in 11 major league games for the New York Yankees in 2001 and 2002.

=== Nippon Professional Baseball ===
From 2003–2005, Knight played for Nippon Professional Baseball (NPB) in Japan. He spent two years in Fukuoka, Japan playing for the Fukuoka Daiei Hawks and one year in Sapporo, Japan playing for the Nippon Ham Fighters.

=== Return to American baseball ===
Upon returning to the United States, Knight signed and played in the Pittsburgh Pirates organization for the 2006 season.

In 2007, Knight signed with the Somerset Patriots of the Atlantic League. Brett Jodie, the former Yankee pitcher, now the Patriots pitching coach noticed that Knight's release point was too high. After Knight modified his release point, his command and velocity improved. The Mets decided to purchase his contract and signed him to their Triple-A team (New Orleans Zephyrs) in New Orleans, Louisiana.

While pitching for the New Orleans Zephyrs, Knight was selected to play for the U.S. Olympic team at the 2008 Summer Olympics in Beijing, China. Knight pitched in two baseball games at the Olympics, earning one win. He earned a bronze medal as part of the U.S. team.

Knight made his first career major league start in Shea Stadium for the New York Mets on July 26, 2008, against the St. Louis Cardinals. He allowed four runs in the first inning, but settled down, and held the Cardinals scoreless through the next four innings. Though he left the game with the Mets leading 5-4, the bullpen was unable to hold the lead and Knight was denied his first major league win. He was designated for assignment the following day, so that he could remain on the Olympic Roster. He was recalled to the Mets when rosters expanded in September, and he earned his first MLB win later in the year.

=== KBO League ===
On July 24, 2009, the New York Mets released Knight so that he could sign with the Samsung Lions in South Korea. On August 4, 2010, he was released from Samsung Lions due to an injury.

Knight played with the Nexen Heroes Baseball Club of Seoul, South Korea from 2011 to 2014. In 2012 he led the KBO in ERA with 2.20 and innings pitched with 208-2/3, and was second in wins with 16. His career record in Korea was 48 wins and 38 losses with an ERA of 3.84.

Since his retirement in 2015, Knight has been coaching within the Heroes organization. He is the franchise's current pitching coach.

== Personal life ==
Knight was born in Oxnard, California. He was raised in Ventura, California, and continues to reside there with his wife Brooke and children.

== See also ==
- Rule 5 draft results
