= Minoa (western Crete) =

Town on the north coast of ancient Crete

Coordinates: 35°30′43″N 24°10′42″E

Minoa (Ancient Greek: Μινώα) was a town on the north coast of ancient Crete on the Cisamun promontory (now Akrotiri).

The site of Minoa is located near modern Marathi.
