= Randy Keisler =

American baseball player (born 1976)

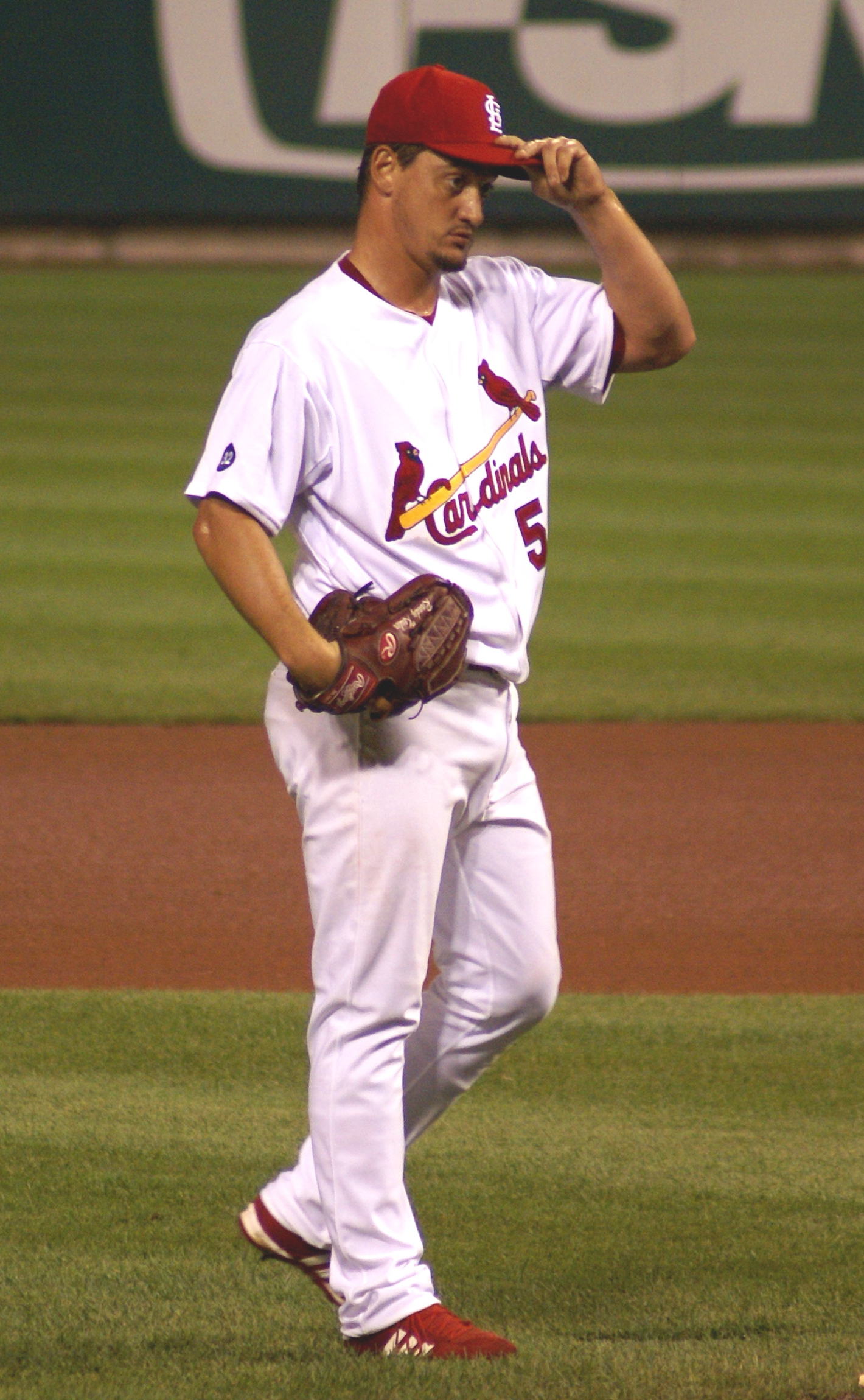
- Pitcher
- Born: February 24, 1976 (age 50); Richards, Texas, U.S.
- Batted: Left Threw: Left

MLB debut
- September 10, 2000, for the New York Yankees

Last MLB appearance
- July 27, 2007, for the St. Louis Cardinals

MLB statistics
- Win–loss record: 4–4
- Earned run average: 6.63
- Strikeouts: 100
- Stats at Baseball Reference

Teams
- New York Yankees (2000–2001); San Diego Padres (2003); Cincinnati Reds (2005); Oakland Athletics (2006); St. Louis Cardinals (2007)

Randy Dean Keisler (born February 24, 1976) is an American former professional baseball pitcher. He attended Palmer High School in Palmer, Texas, and Louisiana State University.

== Career ==
=== New York Yankees ===
Keisler was drafted by the New York Yankees in the 2nd round of the 1998 MLB draft out of LSU. He had previously been drafted by the Cleveland Indians in the 40th round of the 1995 MLB draft and the 57th round of the 1996 MLB draft and the New York Mets in the 40th round of the 1997 MLB draft but did not sign with either of those teams. He signed with the Yankees on June 2, 1998. He was selected as the Yankees Minor League player of the Year in 2000 when he was a combined 14–5 with a 2.85 ERA in 28 starts for Double-A Norwich and AAA Columbus.

Keisler made his Major League debut with the Yankees on September 10, 2000, against the Boston Red Sox, starting and pitching five innings to earn the win while allowing only one earned run. He appeared in 3 more games for the Yankees in 2000 out of the bullpen and then started 10 games for them in 2001. In his two seasons of part-time work he was 2–2 with a 7.19 ERA. He then missed the entire 2002 season while recovering from shoulder surgery he underwent in late 2001. In May 2002, Keisler, already on rehab with the shoulder injury, was bitten by a pygmy rattlesnake while gardening in his backyard. The Yankees released him in February, 2003.

=== San Diego Padres ===
Keisler signed as a free agent with the San Diego Padres on February 16, 2003, and made two starts with the Padres, while also appearing in 8 games (6 starts) for the AAA Portland Beavers. The Padres released him on June 5, 2003.

=== Texas Rangers/Houston Astros ===
He signed as a free agent with the Texas Rangers on June 16, 2003, and appeared in 5 games (2 starts) for the AAA Oklahoma RedHawks before he was released on July 14. Three days later he was signed by the Houston Astros and assigned to AAA New Orleans. He made nine starts and was 2–3 with a 4.28 ERA before becoming a free agent at the end of the season.

=== New York Mets ===
Keisler signed as a free agent with the New York Mets on February 17, 2004, and played the 2004 season with the AAA Norfolk Tides. He was 6–7 with a 3.81 ERA in 21 starts for the Tides.

=== Cincinnati Reds ===
He signed with the Cincinnati Reds as a free agent on November 12, 2004, and began the season with the AAA Louisville Bats where he was 5–2 in 12 appearances (7 starts) for a 2.88 ERA. He returned to the Majors on May 24 and made 24 appearances for the Reds in 2005, including 4 starts for a 2–1 record and 6.27 ERA.

=== Oakland Athletics ===
The Oakland Athletics signed him as a free agent on January 5, 2006, and he made 11 appearances (all out of the bullpen for the A's in 2006, with a 4.50 era and no record. He also made 25 appearances (16 starts) for the Sacramento River Cats in the Pacific Coast League, where he was 9–5 with a 3.83 ERA.

=== St. Louis Cardinals ===
He signed with the St. Louis Cardinals on November 16, 2006, but only made 4 appearances with the Cardinals, 3 of which were starts he finished 0–0 with a 5.19 ERA. He also made 24 starts for the AAA Memphis Redbirds and was 8–11 with a 4.79 ERA for the Redbirds.

=== Minnesota Twins/Chicago Cubs/Baltimore Orioles ===
Keisler signed a minor league contract with the Minnesota Twins on January 11, 2008, but was released during spring training and signed a minor league contract with the Chicago Cubs. On June 3, he opted out of his contract and on June 10, he signed with the Baltimore Orioles. In 2008, he was a combined 6–9 with a 4.03 ERA in 20 starts for the Iowa Cubs and Norfolk Tides.

=== 2009/2010 ===
Unable to sign with any Major League or affiliated minor league team after the 2008 season, he played in 2009 for the Southern Maryland Blue Crabs in the independent Atlantic League of Professional Baseball and in 2010 he played for the Vaqueros Laguna in the Mexican League.

=== Los Angeles Dodgers ===
On March 3, 2011, he attended an open tryout, sponsored by the Los Angeles Dodgers and was signed to a Minor League contract He was assigned to the AAA Albuquerque Isotopes, where he appeared in 23 games (19 starts) and was 7–7 with a 4.67 ERA.

=== Independent career ===
He signed with the Long Island Ducks for the 2012 season and the Uni-President 7-Eleven Lions in 2013.
