= Adrián Hernández (baseball, born 1975) =

Cuban baseball pitcher

Adrian Hernandez
- Pitcher
- Born: March 25, 1975 (age 51); Havana, Cuba
- Batted: Right Threw: Right

MLB debut
- April 21, 2001, for the New York Yankees

Last MLB appearance
- May 8, 2004, for the Milwaukee Brewers

MLB statistics
- Win–loss record: 0–6
- Earned run average: 6.55
- Strikeouts: 33
- Stats at Baseball Reference

Teams
- New York Yankees (2001–2002); Milwaukee Brewers (2004)

Adrian Hernandez (born March 25, 1975) is a Cuban former Major League Baseball pitcher who played for the New York Yankees and Milwaukee Brewers.

Born in Cuba, Hernández defected to the United States in January 2000.

== Baseball career ==
=== New York Yankees ===
Hernandez was signed by the New York Yankees as an amateur free agent on June 2, 2000, to a four-year, $4 million contract. He was instantly dubbed the nickname "El Duquecito" due to the similar pitching style of fellow Cuban Orlando Hernández. Hernández flew through the Yankees minor league organization in 2000 after going 8–2, with a 3.89 earned run average and 86 strikeouts in 12 games, all starts.

Hernandez made his major league debut on April 21, 2001, versus the Boston Red Sox, pitching three innings allowing one earned run on two hits. He was called up and sent down to the minors on three occasions in 2001 and finished the season, going 0–3 in six games (three starts), with 10 strikeouts and a 3.68 ERA.

In 2002, Hernandez struggled in both the majors and the minors. He finished the season with a 12.00 ERA in two games in the majors. After spending the entire 2003 season in the minors he was granted free agency by the Yankees on October 15, 2003.

=== Milwaukee Brewers ===
On October 15, 2004, Hernandez signed with the Milwaukee Brewers. After making five relief appearances for the Brewers, he made his first start with the team on May 8, 2004. Despite not allowing any hits, he walked seven batters and gave up three runs in 4.1 innings. On May 11, 2004, he was designated for assignment by the Brewers and was optioned to the Triple-A Indianapolis Indians. In the minors, he struggled, going 0–8 leading to the end of his career.

== See also ==
- List of baseball players who defected from Cuba
