= East Syracuse-Minoa Central High School =

East Syracuse-Minoa Central High School 67

Location
- 6400 Fremont Rd; East Syracuse, New York 13057; United States
- 43°4′55″N 76°1′36″W

Information
- Type: Public
- School district: East Syracuse-Minoa Central School District
- NCES School ID: 360999000772
- Principal: Edward A. Michalenko
- Teaching staff: 98.05 (on an FTE basis)
- Grades: 9-12
- Enrollment: 1,156 (2023-2024)
- Student to teacher ratio: 11.79
- Campus: Suburban
- Colors: Navy Blue and Orange
- Mascot: Spartans
- Yearbook: Nostrae Memoriae
- Website: chs.esmschools.org

East Syracuse-Minoa Central High School is a New York State public high school located on Fremont Road, near Kirkville Road, in the village of East Syracuse. The school serves grades 9–12 in the East Syracuse-Minoa Central School District, and enrolls approximately 1050 students. The centralized students are from the villages of East Syracuse and Minoa, Chittenango, the hamlet of Kirkville, and the easternmost portion of Eastwood. School colors are orange and navy blue, and the school's mascot is a Spartan hoplite.

2017 ESM named to the College Board's 8th Annual AP (Advanced Placement) District Honor Roll (one of only 447 districts in the U.S. and Canada and 26 in New York State).

2017, 2015 ESM Spartan Marching Band earned a New York State Championship in Small School 1 Division

Since 2014 List of “Best Communities for Music Education”

2013 Be the Change for Kids Innovation Award for Science, Technology, Engineering and Math-related (STEM) programs

2013 Newsweek's List of America's Best High Schools
