= East Syracuse-Minoa Central School District =

School district in New York, United States

East Syracuse Minoa Central School District

Location
- East Syracuse, New York; United States
- Coordinates: 43.094706°N 76.028155°W

District information
- Type: Public Primary and Secondary
- Motto: "A 21st Century Learning Community"
- Superintendent: Dr. Donna J. DeSiato
- Budget: $82,319,532

Students and staff
- Enrollment: 3,471 total 1,226 high school 877 middle school 1,366 elementary school 285 pre-k
- Faculty: 330
- Staff: 173
- Athletic conference: 24 NYSPHSAA Section III varsity teams
- District mascot: Spartan
- Colors: Orange and Blue

Other information
- Website: www.esmschools.org

The East Syracuse Minoa Central School District (ESM) is a pre-K through 12th grade public school district with its headquarters in Manlius, New York, enrolling approximately 3,500 students. ESM serves portions of the towns of DeWitt and Manlius, specifically the villages of East Syracuse, Minoa, and Kirkville as well as portions of Eastwood, Fayetteville, and Bridgeport. The district is partially funded by and governed under the authority of the New York State Education Department, whose standardized examinations are designed and administered by the Board of Regents of the University of the State of New York.

== Demographics ==
As of the Fall of 2018, there were approximately 3,500 students enrolled in the East Syracuse Minoa Central School District. As of the fall of 2010, The racial/ethnic makeup of the student population was 92.2% White, 3.2% Black or African American, 1.4% Asian or Pacific Islander, 1.4% Hispanic, and 1.8% Native American. Approximately 1.8% of the population, or 64 students, demonstrated limited English proficiency. About 6.6% of the student body qualified for a reduced lunch price, and 12.9% were eligible for a free lunch.

There were 323 teachers and 653 total staff employed in the school district, with a student to teacher ratio of approximately 11:1, though it is noted that the average ratio in eighth grade, and tenth grade core classes ranged only 19-20 students per teacher.

== Schools ==
=== High School (Grades 9-12) ===
- East Syracuse-Minoa Central High School,
  Mr. Edward A. Michalenko, Executive Principal
  6400 Fremont Road
  East Syracuse, NY 13057.

=== Middle School (Grades 6-8) ===
- Pine Grove Middle School,
  Ms. Ashleigh E. Wilson, Principal
  101 Spartan Way
  East Syracuse, NY 13057

=== Elementary Schools (Grades K-5) ===
- East Syracuse Elementary School,
  Ms Nicole Petranchuk, Principal
  230 Kinne Street
  East Syracuse, NY 13057
- Fremont Elementary School,
  Ms. Kelsey DeLany, Principal
  115 Richmond Road West
  East Syracuse, NY 13057
- Minoa Elementary School,
  Mr. Gary Gerst, Principal
  501 N. Main Street
  Minoa, NY 13116
- Woodland Elementary School,
  Ms Sarah Schumaker Principal
  100 Spartan Way
  East Syracuse, NY 13057

=== Specialty Schools ===
- Park Hill Pre-Kindergarten,
  Ms. Jordyn Brienzi, Principal
  303 Roby Avenue
  East Syracuse, NY 13057

== Administration ==
Dr. Donna J. DeSiato is the current Superintendent of Schools, serving since 2005.
Mr. Grenardo L. Avellino is the current Deputy Superintendent. Avellino is a former Executive Principal of the East Syracuse-Minoa Central High School from 2012 to 2023.

== See also ==
- List of high schools in New York (state)
- List of school districts in New York
