= Minoa (eastern Crete) =

Ancient city of east Crete near Pachia Ammos

Coordinates: 35°06′37″N 25°48′56″E

Minoa (Ancient Greek: Μινώα) was a city on the north coast of ancient Crete, which belonged to the district of Lyctus, and stood on the narrowest part of the island, at a distance of 60 stadia from Hierapytna.

The site of Minoa is located near modern Pakheia Ammos.
