= Christian Parker =

American baseball player (born 1975)

- Pitcher
- Born: July 3, 1975 (age 51); Albuquerque, New Mexico, U.S.
- Batted: Right Threw: Right

MLB debut
- April 6, 2001, for the New York Yankees

Last MLB appearance
- April 6, 2001, for the New York Yankees

MLB statistics
- Win–loss record: 0–1
- Earned run average: 21.00
- Strikeouts: 1
- Stats at Baseball Reference

Teams
- New York Yankees (2001)

Christian Michael Parker (born July 3, 1975) is an American former baseball player. He was drafted by the Montreal Expos in the 4th round of the 1996 Major League Baseball draft. Parker has played in one Major League Baseball (MLB) game during his career, which came on April 6, 2001. He pitched three innings for the New York Yankees, and gave up seven runs in three innings, while striking out one.

Parker was the player to be named later in the trade that sent Hideki Irabu to Montreal. Following the 2002 season, he was granted free agency, and went on to sign with New York once more, although he never again appeared in a Major League game. He was granted free agency after the 2003 season, and ended up signing with Montreal again. He signed with the Colorado Rockies after the 2004 season.

On May 12, 2005, while playing for the Colorado Springs Sky Sox in the Rockies organization, Parker was suspended for violating the minor league steroid policy. He was again a free agent following the 2005 season.
