= Minoa (Siphnos) =

Minoa (Ancient Greek: Μινῳα), was a town of ancient Greece on the island of Siphnos mentioned by Stephanus of Byzantium.

Its site is unlocated.
