= Dairylea Cooperative Inc. =

Former American dairy cooperative

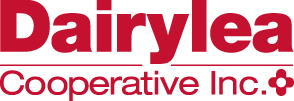
- Type: Agricultural marketing cooperative
- Industry: Food
- Founded: 1907; Orange County, New York, United States
- Defunct: April 1, 2014
- Fate: merged with Dairy Farmers of America
- Headquarters: East Syracuse, New York, United States
- Area served: Northeastern United States
- Key people: Gregory I. Wickham (CEO)
- Products: Dairy
- Members: 2,000+

Dairylea Cooperative Inc. was a dairy cooperative which was founded in 1907 as The Dairymen's League when group of dairy farmers in Orange County, New York united to increase their bargaining power. In the 1920s, the Cooperative's membership had increased to more than 100,000 farms. While based initially in Pearl River, New York, the organization was most recently headquartered in East Syracuse, New York. They renamed themselves after their most famous product, Dairylea Milk. It was formerly named Dairyman's League Co-Operative Association, and changed its name to its present one in 1969.

While it changed and adapted over the years, Dairylea helped manage the sale and distribution of raw milk from more than 2,500 farms producing 5.5 billion pounds of milk annually. In 2001, it was the largest marketer of raw milk in the northeastern United States. The cooperative was a part of the National Milk Producers Federation. Dairylea merged with Dairy Farmers of America on April 1, 2014.

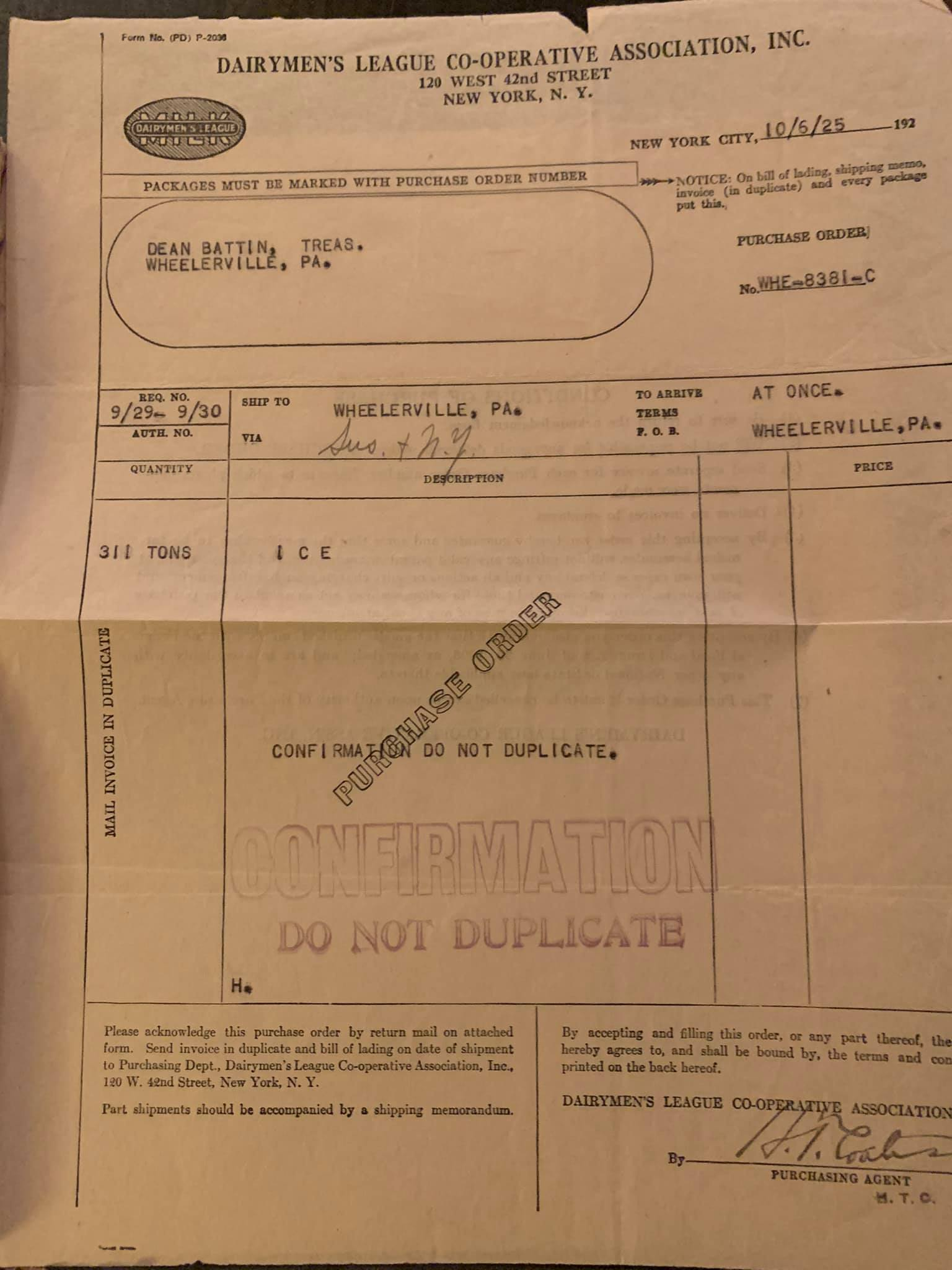
DLCA invoice
