= Minoa (Paros) =

Minoa (Ancient Greek: Μινώα), or Minoea or Minoia or Minoida, was a town of ancient Greece on the island of Paros.

Its site is unlocated on Paros.
