= Minoa, New York =

Village in New York, United States

- Village
- Seal

- Location in Onondaga County and the state of New York.
- Coordinates: 43°4′37″N 76°0′25″W
- Country: United States
- State: New York
- County: Onondaga

Government
  - Mayor: William F. Brazill

Area
  - Total: 1.32 sq mi (3.42 km^{2})
  - Land: 1.32 sq mi (3.42 km^{2})
  - Water: 0 sq mi (0.00 km^{2})
- Elevation: 413 ft (126 m)

Population (2020)
  - Total: 3,657
  - Density: 2,768.5/sq mi (1,068.92/km^{2})
- Time zone: UTC-5 (Eastern (EST))
  - Summer (DST): UTC-4 (EDT)
- ZIP code: 13116
- Area code: 315
- FIPS code: 36-47757
- GNIS feature ID: 0957426
- Website: villageofminoa.gov

Minoa is a village in Onondaga County, New York, United States. As of the 2020 census, the population was 3,657. Minoa is in the northern part of the town of Manlius and is east of Syracuse.

== History ==
Minoa is in the former Central New York Military Tract. It was known as "Manlius Station", a stop on the Syracuse and Utica Railroad (completed in 1839), until the name was changed to Minoa in 1895. The name change was driven by a group of women landowners in the area.

The village was incorporated in 1913 and was once a prominent railroad community.

== Geography ==
Minoa is located at 43°4′37″N 76°0′25″W (43.077067, -76.006955).

According to the United States Census Bureau, the village has a total area of 1.2 square miles (3.1 km^{2}), all land.

== Demographics ==
Historical population
Census	Pop.	Note	%±
1920	867		—
1930	899		3.7%
1940	902		0.3%
1950	1,008		11.8%
1960	1,838		82.3%
1970	2,245		22.1%
1980	3,640		62.1%
1990	3,745		2.9%
2000	3,348		−10.6%
2010	3,449		3.0%
2020	3,657		6.0%
U.S. Decennial Census

=== 2020 census ===
As of the 2020 census, Minoa had a population of 3,657. The median age was 42.2 years. 22.5% of residents were under the age of 18 and 22.0% of residents were 65 years of age or older. For every 100 females there were 92.6 males, and for every 100 females age 18 and over there were 87.7 males age 18 and over.

99.8% of residents lived in urban areas, while 0.2% lived in rural areas.

There were 1,461 households in Minoa, of which 32.5% had children under the age of 18 living in them. Of all households, 49.2% were married-couple households, 16.0% were households with a male householder and no spouse or partner present, and 28.0% were households with a female householder and no spouse or partner present. About 28.3% of all households were made up of individuals and 12.7% had someone living alone who was 65 years of age or older.

There were 1,503 housing units, of which 2.8% were vacant. The homeowner vacancy rate was 1.2% and the rental vacancy rate was 3.2%.

Racial composition as of the 2020 census
Race	Number	Percent
White	3,324	90.9%
Black or African American	41	1.1%
American Indian and Alaska Native	21	0.6%
Asian	50	1.4%
Native Hawaiian and Other Pacific Islander	1	0.0%
Some other race	35	1.0%
Two or more races	185	5.1%
Hispanic or Latino (of any race)	94	2.6%

=== 2000 census ===
As of the census of 2000, there were 3,348 people, 1,249 households, and 940 families residing in the village. The population density was 2,700.3 inhabitants per square mile (1,042.6/km^{2}). There were 1,293 housing units at an average density of 1,042.8 per square mile (402.6/km^{2}). The racial makeup of the village was 96.62% White, 0.51% African American, 0.42% Native American, 1.43% Asian, 0.03% Pacific Islander, 0.21% from other races, and 0.78% from two or more races. Hispanic or Latino of any race were 0.57% of the population.

There were 1,249 households, out of which 38.4% had children under the age of 18 living with them, 58.1% were married couples living together, 13.5% had a female householder with no husband present, and 24.7% were non-families. 20.7% of all households were made up of individuals, and 9.3% had someone living alone who was 65 years of age or older. The average household size was 2.62 and the average family size was 3.03.

In the village, the population was spread out, with 26.1% under the age of 18, 7.0% from 18 to 24, 28.0% from 25 to 44, 25.1% from 45 to 64, and 13.8% who were 65 years of age or older. The median age was 39 years. For every 100 females, there were 88.6 males. For every 100 females age 18 and over, there were 83.9 males.

=== Income and poverty ===
The median income for a household in the village was $93,125 in 2023. Males had a median income of $65,123 versus $35,590 for females. The per capita income for the village was $52,396 in 2023.

== Education ==
The school district is East Syracuse-Minoa Central School District.

== Notable people ==
- Larry Costello (1931–2001), former professional basketball player and coach; member of the Basketball Hall of Fame
