= Brett Jodie =

American baseball player & coach (born 1977)

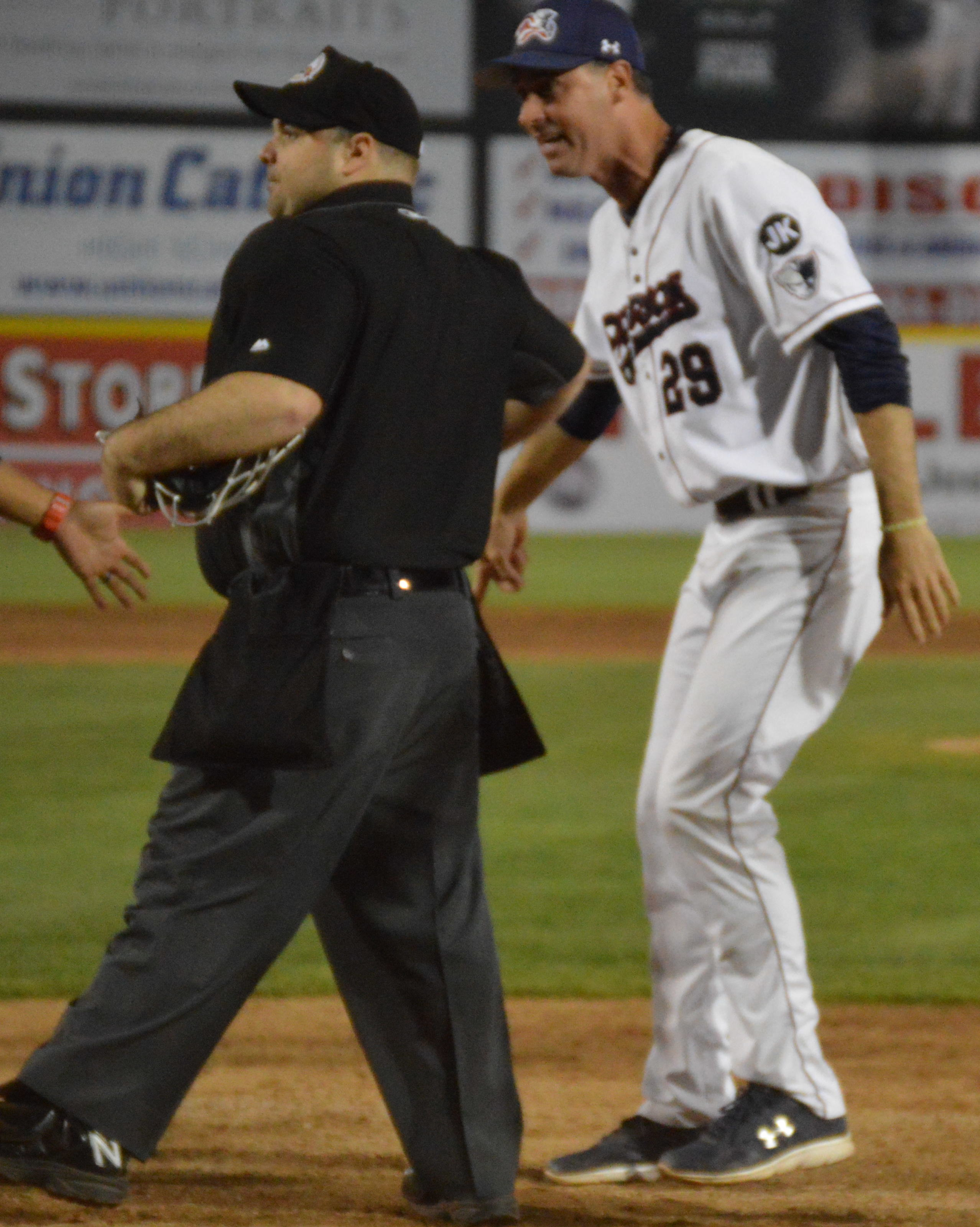
- Jodie (right) with the Somerset Patriots in 2018

Southern Maryland Blue Crabs
- Pitcher / Manager
- Born: March 25, 1977 (age 49); Columbia, South Carolina, U.S.
- Batted: Right Threw: Right

MLB debut
- July 20, 2001, for the New York Yankees

Last MLB appearance
- October 7, 2001, for the San Diego Padres

MLB statistics
- Win–loss record: 0–2
- Earned run average: 6.39
- Strikeouts: 13
- Stats at Baseball Reference

Teams
- New York Yankees (2001); San Diego Padres (2001)

Brett Paul Jodie (born March 25, 1977) is an American professional baseball coach and former pitcher who currently serves as the manager for the Southern Maryland Blue Crabs of the Atlantic League of Professional Baseball. He played in Major League Baseball (MLB) for the New York Yankees and San Diego Padres in 2001. He batted and threw right-handed.

== Playing career ==
Jodie attended the University of South Carolina. He was drafted by the Yankees in the sixth round (187th overall) of the 1998 Major League Baseball draft. He had a 0–2 record, with a 6.39 earned run average (ERA) in his eight major league appearances for the Yankees and San Diego Padres in 2001.

Jodie returned to the Yankees organization following the 2001 season, remaining in their minor league system until 2002. In 2003 and in 2005, Jodie pitched for the Somerset Patriots of the independent Atlantic League of Professional Baseball before retiring in 2006.

== Coaching career ==
=== Somerset Patriots ===
Jodie was the pitching coach for the Somerset Patriots and was named manager on November 27, 2012, replacing Sparky Lyle. Jodie managed the team through the 2019 season, winning a championship in 2015. He was not retained as manager following the Patriots' promotion to Minor League Baseball for the 2021 season and beyond.

=== Lincoln Saltdogs ===
On April 7, 2021, Jodie was announced as new manager for the Lincoln Saltdogs of the American Association of Professional Baseball.

=== Southern Maryland Blue Crabs ===
On December 19, 2025, Jodie was hired to serve as the manager of the Southern Maryland Blue Crabs of the Atlantic League of Professional Baseball, following the resignation of Stan Cliburn.
