= 2002 Cleveland Indians season =

2002 Cleveland Indians
- League: American League
- Division: Central
- Ballpark: Jacobs Field
- City: Cleveland, Ohio
- Record: 74–88 (.457)
- Divisional place: 3rd
- Owners: Larry Dolan
- General managers: Mark Shapiro
- Managers: Charlie Manuel (fired July 11) Joel Skinner (interim, July 11-September 29)
- Television: FSN Ohio; John Sanders, Mike Hegan, Rick Manning
- Radio: WTAM; Tom Hamilton, Matt Underwood, Mike Hegan

The 2002 Cleveland Indians season was the 102nd season for the franchise and the 9th season at Jacobs Field. The season began on March 31, 2002. The team finished third in the American League Central behind the Minnesota Twins and the Chicago White Sox, and suffered their first losing season since 1993.

== Offseason ==
- November 7, 2001: Chris Coste was signed as a free agent by the Indians.
- November 7, 2001: Jason Beverlin was signed as a free agent by the Indians.
- November 26, 2001: Donzell McDonald was signed as a free agent by the Indians.
- December 11, 2001: Roberto Alomar, Mike Bacsik and Danny Peoples (minors) were traded by the Indians to the New York Mets for Matt Lawton, Alex Escobar, Jerrod Riggan and players to be named later. The Mets completed the deal by sending Earl Snyder and Billy Traber to the Indians on December 13.
- December 18, 2001: John Rocker was traded by the Indians to the Texas Rangers for Dave Elder.
- February 9, 2002: Bruce Aven was signed as a free agent with the Cleveland Indians.
- March 28, 2002: Donzell McDonald was assigned by the Indians to the Kansas City Royals.

== Regular season ==
=== Opening Day starters ===
- Matt Lawton – RF
- Omar Vizquel – SS
- Ellis Burks – DH
- Jim Thome – 1B
- Travis Fryman – 3B
- Ricky Gutiérrez – 2B
- Milton Bradley – CF
- Russell Branyan – LF
- Einar Díaz – C
- Bartolo Colón – SP

=== Season standings ===
AL Central
Team	W	L	Pct.	GB	Home	Road
Minnesota Twins	94	67	.584	—	54‍–‍27	40‍–‍40
Chicago White Sox	81	81	.500	13½	47‍–‍34	34‍–‍47
Cleveland Indians	74	88	.457	20½	39‍–‍42	35‍–‍46
Kansas City Royals	62	100	.383	32½	37‍–‍44	25‍–‍56
Detroit Tigers	55	106	.342	39	33‍–‍47	22‍–‍59

=== American League Wild Card ===
Division leaders
Team	W	L	Pct.
New York Yankees	103	58	.640
Minnesota Twins	94	67	.584
Oakland Athletics	103	59	.636

Wild Card team (Top team qualifies for postseason)
Team	W	L	Pct.	GB
Anaheim Angels	99	63	.611	—
Boston Red Sox	93	69	.574	6
Seattle Mariners	93	69	.574	6
Chicago White Sox	81	81	.500	18
Toronto Blue Jays	78	84	.481	21
Cleveland Indians	74	88	.457	25
Texas Rangers	72	90	.444	27
Baltimore Orioles	67	95	.414	32
Kansas City Royals	62	100	.383	37
Detroit Tigers	55	106	.342	43½
Tampa Bay Devil Rays	55	106	.342	43½

=== Record vs. opponents ===
2002 American League record Source: MLB Standings Grid – 2002
Team	ANA	BAL	BOS	CWS	CLE	DET	KC	MIN	NYY	OAK	SEA	TB	TEX	TOR	NL
Anaheim	—	7–2	3–4	6–3	6–3	8–1	6–3	4–5	3–4	9–11	9–10	8–1	12–7	7–2	11–7
Baltimore	2–7	—	6–13	3–4	1–5	2–4	7–0	5–1	6–13	4–5	5–4	10–9	3–6	4–15	9–9
Boston	4–3	13–6	—	2–4	5–4	5–4	4–2	3–3	9–10	6–3	4–5	16–3	4–3	13–6	5–13
Chicago	3–6	4–3	4–2	—	9–10	12–7	11–8	8–11	2–4	2–7	5–4	4–3	5–4	4–2	8–10
Cleveland	3–6	5–1	4–5	10–9	—	10–9	9–10	8–11	3–6	2–5	3–4	4–2	4–5	3–3	6–12
Detroit	1–8	4–2	4–5	7–12	9–10	—	9–10	4–14	1–8	1–6	2–5	2–4	5–4	0–6	6–12
Kansas City	3–6	0–7	2–4	8–11	10–9	10–9	—	5–14	1–5	1–8	3–6	4–2	7–2	3–4	5–13
Minnesota	5–4	1–5	3–3	11–8	11–8	14–4	14–5	—	0–6	3–6	5–4	5–2	6–3	6–1	10–8
New York	4–3	13–6	10–9	4–2	6–3	8–1	5–1	6–0	—	5–4	4–5	13–5	4–3	10–9	11–7
Oakland	11–9	5–4	3–6	7–2	5–2	6–1	8–1	6–3	4–5	—	8–11	8–1	13–6	3–6	16–2
Seattle	10–9	4–5	5–4	4–5	4–3	5–2	6–3	4–5	5–4	11–8	—	5–4	13–7	6–3	11–7
Tampa Bay	1–8	9–10	3–16	3–4	2–4	4–2	2–4	2–5	5–13	1–8	4–5	—	4–5	8–11	7–11
Texas	7–12	6–3	3–4	4–5	5–4	4–5	2–7	3–6	3–4	6–13	7–13	5–4	—	8–1	9–9
Toronto	2–7	15–4	6–13	2–4	3–3	6–0	4–3	1–6	9–10	6–3	3–6	11–8	1–8	—	9–9

=== Notable transactions ===
- June 4, 2002: Jeremy Guthrie was drafted by the Indians in the 1st round (22nd pick) of the 2002 Major League Baseball draft. Player signed on October 3, 2002.
- June 7, 2002: Russell Branyan was traded by the Indians to the Cincinnati Reds for Ben Broussard.
- June 25, 2002: Bruce Aven was traded by the Indians to the Philadelphia Phillies for Jeff D'Amico.
- June 27, 2002: Bartolo Colón and Tim Drew were traded by the Indians to the Montreal Expos for Grady Sizemore, Cliff Lee, Brandon Phillips, and Lee Stevens.
- July 28, 2002: Paul Shuey was traded by the Indians to the Los Angeles Dodgers for Ricardo Rodríguez, Terry Mulholland, and Francisco Cruceta.
- August 16, 2002: Jason Beverlin was selected off waivers from the Indians by the Detroit Tigers.

=== Roster ===
2002 Cleveland Indians
**Roster**
**Pitchers**: 55 Danys Báez; 49 Jason Beverlin; 34 Dave Burba; 40 Bartolo Colón; 64 Jason Davis; 56 Sean DePaula; 57 Ryan Drese; 47 Dave Elder; 31 Chuck Finley; 49 Alex Herrera; 65 Cliff Lee; 50 Dave Maurer; 45 Terry Mulholland; 58 Heath Murray; 41 Charles Nagy; 16 Chad Paronto; 59 Jason Phillips; 51 Jerrod Riggan; 73 Ricardo Rincón; 54 David Riske; 49 Nerio Rodríguez; 46 Ricardo Rodríguez; 52 CC Sabathia; 53 Carl Sadler; 53 Paul Shuey; 48 Roy Smith; 60 Brian Tallet; 37 Jake Westbrook; 26 Bob Wickman; 39 Mark Wohlers; 27 Jaret Wright	**Catchers**: 44 Josh Bard; 2 Einar Díaz; 63 Víctor Martínez; 38 Eddie Pérez; **Infielders**: 28 Ben Broussard; 17 Travis Fryman; 12 Ricky Gutiérrez; 62 Greg LaRocca; 8 John McDonald; 61 Brandon Phillips; 36 Bill Selby; 9 Lee Stevens; 25 Jim Thome; 13 Omar Vizquel	**Outfielders**: 9 Chad Allen; 9 Brady Anderson; 20 Bruce Aven; 24 Milton Bradley; 28 Russell Branyan; 23 Ellis Burks; 10 Jolbert Cabrera; 30 Wil Cordero; 10 Coco Crisp; 44 Todd Dunwoody; 20 Karim García; 11 Matt Lawton; 30 Chris Magruder; 22 Earl Snyder	**Manager**: 32 Charlie Manuel; 35 Joel Skinner; **Coaches**: 45 Mike Brown (Pitching); 1 Al Bumbry (First Base); 29 Jeff Datz (Bench, Third Base); 4 Luis Isaac (Bullpen); 87 Dave Keller (Bullpen Catcher); 33 Eddie Murray (Hitting); 35 Joel Skinner (Third Base); 6 Robby Thompson (First Base, Bench); 43 Dan Williams (Bullpen Catcher)

=== Game log ===
2002 Game Log: 74–88 (Home: 39–42; Away: 35–46)
March: 1–0 (Home: 0–0; Away: 1–0)

#	Date	Opponent	Score	Win	Loss	Save	Stadium	Attendance	Record	Streak
1	March 31	@ Angels	6–0	**Colón** (1–0)	Washburn (0–1)	—	Edison International Field of Anaheim	42,697	1–0	W1

April: 12–13 (Home: 7–4; Away: 5–9)

#	Date	Opponent	Score	Win	Loss	Save	Stadium	Attendance	Record	Streak
2	April 2	@ Angels	5–7	Weber (1–0)	**Riske** (0–1)	Percival (1)	Edison International Field of Anaheim	20,055	1–1	L1
3	April 3	@ Angels	6–5	**Drese** (1–0)	Sele (0–1)	**Wickman** (1)	Edison International Field of Anaheim	18,194	2–1	W1
4	April 5	@ Tigers	10–1	**Báez** (1–0)	Redman (0–1)	—	Comerica Park	41,248	3–1	W2
5	April 6	@ Tigers	5–3	**Colón** (2–0)	Cornejo (0–1)	**Wickman** (2)	Comerica Park	19,754	4–1	W3
6	April 7	@ Tigers	5–1	**Sabathia** (1–0)	Weaver (0–1)	**Wickman** (3)	Comerica Park	14,749	5–1	W4
7	April 8	Twins	9–5	**Drese** (2–0)	Milton (1–1)	—	**Jacobs Field**	42,441	6–1	W5
8	April 9	Twins	5–4	**Finley** (1–0)	Mays (0–2)	**Wickman** (4)	**Jacobs Field**	23,760	7–1	W6
9	April 10	Twins	9–3	**Báez** (2–0)	Reed (1–1)	—	**Jacobs Field**	25,420	8–1	W7
10	April 11	Twins	8–4	**Colón** (3–0)	Lohse (0–1)	—	**Jacobs Field**	25,582	9–1	W8
11	April 12	Royals	3–1	**Sabathia** (2–0)	Suppan (1–1)	**Wickman** (5)	**Jacobs Field**	29,970	10–1	W9
12	April 13	Royals	8–7	**Shuey** (1–0)	Bailey (0–2)	—	**Jacobs Field**	28,455	11–1	W10
–	April 14	Royals	Postponed (rain, makeup May 18)							
13	April 16	@ White Sox	5–10	Marte (1–0)	**Finley** (1–1)	—	Comiskey Park	23,502	11–2	L1
14	April 17	@ White Sox	2–7	Buehrle (4–0)	**Báez** (2–1)	—	Comiskey Park	15,561	11–3	L2
15	April 18	@ White Sox	1–7	Ritchie (1–1)	**Colón** (3–1)	—	Comiskey Park	13,880	11–4	L3
16	April 19	@ Twins	3–12	Lohse (1–1)	**Sabathia** (2–1)	—	Hubert H. Humphrey Metrodome	23,491	11–5	L4
17	April 20	@ Twins	2–6	Kinney (1–0)	**Drese** (2–1)	—	Hubert H. Humphrey Metrodome	30,146	11–6	L5
18	April 21	@ Twins	2–4	Reed (2–1)	**Finley** (1–2)	Guerrero (8)	Hubert H. Humphrey Metrodome	22,264	11–7	L6
19	April 22	White Sox	4–2	**Báez** (3–1)	Buehrle (4–1)	**Wickman** (6)	**Jacobs Field**	24,519	12–7	W1
20	April 23	White Sox	1–5	Ritchie (2–1)	**Colón** (3–2)	—	**Jacobs Field**	25,284	12–8	L1
21	April 24	White Sox	2–9	Wright (2–2)	**Sabathia** (2–2)	—	**Jacobs Field**	25,935	12–9	L2
22	April 25	White Sox	3–6	Garland (3–1)	**Drese** (2–2)	Foulke (6)	**Jacobs Field**	29,046	12–10	L3
23	April 26	@ Rangers	7–4	Davis (2–2)	**Finley** (2–2)	—	The Ballpark in Arlington	33,243	13–10	W1
24	April 27	@ Rangers	2–4	Bell (1–0)	**Báez** (3–2)	Irabu (4)	The Ballpark in Arlington	43,353	13–11	L1
25	April 28	@ Rangers	1–2	Valdez (2–3)	**Colón** (3–3)	Irabu (5)	The Ballpark in Arlington	24,118	13–12	L2
26	April 30	Angels	2–21	Ortiz (2–3)	**Sabathia** (2–3)	—	**Jacobs Field**	24,286	13–13	L3

May: 13–15 (Home: 8–8; Away: 5–7)

#	Date	Opponent	Score	Win	Loss	Save	Stadium	Attendance	Record	Streak
27	May 1	Angels	2–7	Washburn (3–2)	**Drese** (2–3)	—	**Jacobs Field**	23,536	13–14	L4
28	May 2	Angels	0–8	Appier (3–1)	**Finley** (2–3)	—	**Jacobs Field**	26,068	13–15	L5
29	May 3	Rangers	2–4	Davis (3–2)	**Báez** (3–3)	Irabu (7)	**Jacobs Field**	32,846	13–16	L6
30	May 4	Rangers	3–0	**Colón** (4–3)	Valdez (2–4)	**Wickman** (7)	**Jacobs Field**	33,788	14–16	W1
31	May 5	Rangers	9–2	**Sabathia** (3–3)	Rogers (3–1)	—	**Jacobs Field**	31,990	15–16	W2
32	May 6	@ Orioles	9–4	**Drese** (3–3)	Groom (1–1)	—	Oriole Park at Camden Yards	24,976	16–16	W3
33	May 7	@ Orioles	3–4 (10)	Julio (2–0)	**Wohlers** (0–1)	—	Oriole Park at Camden Yards	26,455	16–17	L1
34	May 8	@ Orioles	6–2	**Báez** (4–3)	Erickson (3–3)	—	Oriole Park at Camden Yards	29,361	17–17	W1
35	May 9	@ Royals	3–5	Suppan (3–4)	**Rincón** (0–1)	Hernandez (2)	Kauffman Stadium	12,555	17–18	L1
36	May 10	@ Royals	0–9	Reichert (1–3)	**Sabathia** (3–4)	—	Kauffman Stadium	24,279	17–19	L2
–	May 11	@ Royals	Postponed (rain, makeup July 20)							
37	May 12	@ Royals	1–4	Byrd (6–2)	**Finley** (2–4)	Hernandez (3)	Kauffman Stadium	10,820	17–20	L3
38	May 14	Orioles	6–5	**Shuey** (2–0)	Julio (2–2)	—	**Jacobs Field**	30,447	18–20	W1
39	May 15	Orioles	3–1	**Colón** (5–3)	Bauer (1–1)	**Wickman** (8)	**Jacobs Field**	26,315	19–20	W2
–	May 16	Orioles	Postponed (rain, makeup June 13)							
40	May 17	Royals	2–6	Byrd (7–2)	**Finley** (2–5)	—	**Jacobs Field**	32,593	19–21	L1
41	May 18 (1)	Royals	2–4	Reichert (2–4)	**Wickman** (0–1)	Hernandez (4)	**Jacobs Field**	29,388	19–22	L2
42	May 18 (2)	Royals	4–1	**Drese** (4–3)	May (0–1)	**Wickman** (9)	**Jacobs Field**	32,110	20–22	W1
43	May 19	Royals	4–5	Grimsley (2–2)	**Wickman** (0–2)	Hernandez (5)	**Jacobs Field**	31,105	20–23	L1
44	May 20	@ Tigers	3–4	Santana (3–0)	**Rincón** (0–2)	Walker (1)	Comerica Park	12,851	20–24	L2
45	May 21	@ Tigers	1–5	Redman (1–5)	**Nagy** (0–1)	—	Comerica Park	14,442	20–25	L3
46	May 22	@ Tigers	0–2	Weaver (4–5)	**Finley** (2–6)	—	Comerica Park	14,396	20–26	L4
47	May 24	@ Blue Jays	5–2	**Drese** (5–3)	Miller (3–2)	**Wickman** (10)	SkyDome	16,385	21–26	W1
48	May 25	@ Blue Jays	3–0	**Sabathia** (4–4)	Loaiza (2–1)	**Wickman** (11)	SkyDome	21,589	22–26	W2
49	May 26	@ Blue Jays	3–1	**Colón** (6–3)	Prokopec (2–7)	—	SkyDome	22,380	23–26	W3
50	May 27	Tigers	1–4	Redman (2–5)	**Báez** (4–4)	—	**Jacobs Field**	40,652	23–27	L1
51	May 28	Tigers	4–2	**Finley** (3–6)	Weaver (4–6)	**Wickman** (12)	**Jacobs Field**	25,028	24–27	W1
52	May 29	Tigers	5–9	Sparks (3–5)	**Riske** (0–2)	Acevedo (7)	**Jacobs Field**	26,156	24–28	L1
53	May 30	Tigers	11–7	**Riske** (1–2)	Lima (1–3)	—	**Jacobs Field**	25,689	25–28	W1
54	May 31	White Sox	7–0	**Colón** (7–3)	Glover (1–1)	—	**Jacobs Field**	33,756	26–28	W2

June: 11–15 (Home: 6–6; Away: 5–9)

#	Date	Opponent	Score	Win	Loss	Save	Stadium	Attendance	Record	Streak
55	June 1	White Sox	8–4	**Báez** (5–4)	Ritchie (3–7)	—	**Jacobs Field**	37,707	27–28	W3
56	June 2	White Sox	4–3	**Finley** (4–6)	Wright (5–6)	**Wickman** (13)	**Jacobs Field**	37,760	28–28	W4
57	June 4	@ Twins	2–23	Reed (6–2)	**Drese** (5–4)	—	Hubert H. Humphrey Metrodome	14,029	28–29	L1
58	June 5	@ Twins	6–4	**Sabathia** (5–4)	Milton (7–5)	**Riske** (1)	Hubert H. Humphrey Metrodome	15,617	29–29	W1
59	June 6	@ Twins	3–8	Lohse (6–3)	**Colón** (7–4)	—	Hubert H. Humphrey Metrodome	15,553	29–30	L1
60	June 7	Mets	3–4	Leiter (6–5)	**Báez** (5–5)	Benitez (12)	**Jacobs Field**	39,986	29–31	L2
61	June 8	Mets	6–8	Trachsel (4–6)	**Finley** (4–7)	Benitez (13)	**Jacobs Field**	41,474	29–32	L3
62	June 9	Mets	8–3	**Drese** (6–4)	Estes (2–5)	—	**Jacobs Field**	39,436	30–32	W1
63	June 10	Phillies	1–3	Adms (3–4)	**Sabathia** (5–5)	Mesa (18)	**Jacobs Field**	28,440	30–33	L1
64	June 11	Phillies	5–1	**Colón** (8–4)	Wolf (3–5)	**Wickman** (14)	**Jacobs Field**	30,238	31–33	W1
65	June 12	Phillies	3–7	Padilla (9–4)	**Paronto** (0–1)	—	**Jacobs Field**	35,783	31–34	L1
66	June 13	Orioles	2–1 (10)	**Riggan** (1–0)	Roberts (3–2)	—	**Jacobs Field**	26,745	32–34	W1
67	June 14	@ Rockies	5–3	**Drese** (7–4)	Thomson (6–6)	**Wickman** (15)	Coors Field	40,156	33–34	W2
68	June 15	@ Rockies	4–7	Jones (1–1)	**Paronto** (0–2)	Jimenez (18)	Coors Field	41,870	33–35	L1
69	June 16	@ Rockies	5–4	**Colón** (9–4)	Neagle (4–4)	**Wickman** (16)	Coors Field	40,792	34–35	W1
70	June 18	@ Marlins	0–4	Dempster (5–6)	**Finley** (4–8)	—	Pro Player Stadium	9,724	34–36	L1
71	June 19	@ Marlins	1–2	Tavarez (5–3)	**Riggan** (1–1)	Nunez (16)	Pro Player Stadium	9,428	34–37	L2
72	June 20	@ Marlins	0–3 (6)	Burnett (8–5)	**Drese** (7–5)	—	Pro Player Stadium	8,045	34–38	L3
73	June 21	@ Expos	1–3	Vazquez (5–3)	**Sabathia** (5–6)	Stewart (8)	Olympic Stadium	7,494	34–39	L4
74	June 22	@ Expos	5–4	**Colón** (10–4)	Day (2–1)	**Wickman** (17)	Olympic Stadium	10,180	35–39	W1
75	June 23	@ Expos	2–7	Armas (7–7)	**Finley** (4–9)	—	Olympic Stadium	13,557	35–40	L1
76	June 25	@ Red Sox	4–2	**Báez** (6–5)	Castillo (5–8)	**Wickman** (18)	Fenway Park	34,064	36–40	W1
77	June 26	@ Red Sox	4–7	Martinez (9–2)	**Drese** (7–6)	Urbina (21)	Fenway Park	32,255	36–41	L1
–	June 27	@ Red Sox	Postponed (rain, makeup September 16)							
78	June 28	Diamondbacks	8–2	**Sabathia** (6–6)	Batista (4–5)	—	**Jacobs Field**	42,586	37–41	W1
79	June 29	Diamondbacks	2–4	Anderson (3–7)	**Finley** (4–10)	Kim (20)	**Jacobs Field**	42,466	37–42	L1
80	June 30	Diamondbacks	2–5	Schilling (13–3)	**Báez** (6–6)	—	**Jacobs Field**	42,221	37–43	L2

July: 10–16 (Home: 5–8; Away: 5–8)

#	Date	Opponent	Score	Win	Loss	Save	Stadium	Attendance	Record	Streak
81	July 2	@ Yankees	5–10	Mendoza (6–2)	**Rincón** (0–3)	—	Yankee Stadium	45,589	37–44	L3
82	July 3	@ Yankees	8–11	Wells (9–5)	**Sabathia** (6–7)	Rivera (20)	Yankee Stadium	39,879	37–45	L4
83	July 4	@ Yankees	1–7	Mussina (12–3)	**Finley** (4–11)	—	Yankee Stadium	42,909	37–46	L5
84	July 5	@ White Sox	4–2	**Báez** (7–6)	Garland (7–6)	**Wickman** (19)	Comiskey Park	29,085	38–46	W1
85	July 6	@ White Sox	3–7	Buehrle (12–6)	**Phillips** (0–1)	Marte (1)	Comiskey Park	25,016	38–47	L1
86	July 7	@ White Sox	9–3	**Drese** (8–6)	Ritchie (5–11)	—	Comiskey Park	22,104	39–47	W1
–	July 9	73nd All-Star Game	American League vs. National League (Miller Park, Milwaukee, Wisconsin)							
87	July 11	Yankees	4–7	Pettitte (3–3)	**Sabathia** (6–8)	Rivera (22)	**Jacobs Field**	41,192	39–48	L1
88	July 12	Yankees	2–1 (10)	**Wohlers** (1–1)	Karsay (3–4)	—	**Jacobs Field**	42,518	40–48	W1
89	July 13	Yankees	5–14	Wells (10–5)	**Drese** (8–7)	—	**Jacobs Field**	42,631	40–49	L1
90	July 14	Yankees	10–7	**Rincón** (1–3)	Rivera (1–4)	—	**Jacobs Field**	42,573	41–49	W1
91	July 15	White Sox	7–1	**Phillips** (1–1)	Glover (3–5)	—	**Jacobs Field**	30,025	42–49	W2
92	July 16	White Sox	4–5	Osuna (5–1)	**Wickman** (0–3)	Marte (2)	**Jacobs Field**	30,754	42–50	L1
93	July 17	Twins	5–8	Reed (7–5)	**Báez** (7–7)	Guerrero (30)	**Jacobs Field**	33,324	42–51	L2
94	July 18	Twins	6–8	Fiore (8–2)	**Rincón** (1–4)	Guerrero (31)	**Jacobs Field**	33,573	42–52	L3
95	July 19	@ Royals	5–8	Mullen (2–2)	**Murray** (0–1)	Ro. Hernandez (18)	Kauffman Stadium	20,922	42–53	L4
96	July 20 (1)	@ Royals	5–7	Ru. Hernandez (1–0)	**Wright** (0–1)	Ro. Hernandez (19)	Kauffman Stadium	N/A	42–54	L5
97	July 20 (2)	@ Royals	5–3 (10)	**Shuey** (3–0)	Voyles (0–2)	**Wickman** (20)	Kauffman Stadium	36,277	43–54	W1
98	July 21	@ Royals	12–13 (10)	Mullen (3–2)	**Murray** (0–2)	—	Kauffman Stadium	15,637	43–55	L1
99	July 23	Yankees	9–3	**Báez** (8–7)	Pettitte (4–4)	—	**Jacobs Field**	38,520	44–55	W1
100	July 24	Yankees	7–14	Wells (11–5)	**Drese** (8–8)	—	**Jacobs Field**	38,081	44–56	L1
101	July 26	Tigers	5–8	Powell (1–0)	**Nagy** (0–2)	Henriquez (2)	**Jacobs Field**	38,738	44–57	L2
102	July 27	Tigers	1–5	Sparks (5–10)	**Sabathia** (6–9)	—	**Jacobs Field**	38,622	44–58	L3
103	July 28	Tigers	9–6	**DePaula** (1–0)	Acevedo (1–5)	—	**Jacobs Field**	35,076	45–58	W1
104	July 29	@ Athletics	8–6	**Mulholland** (1–0)	Magnante (0–2)	**Wohlers** (1)	Network Associates Coliseum	18,297	46–58	W2
105	July 30	@ Athletics	5–4	**Drese** (9–8)	Lidle (3–9)	**Wohlers** (2)	Network Associates Coliseum	14,737	47–58	W3
106	July 31	@ Athletics	4–6	Mulder (12–6)	**Westbrook** (0–1)	Koch (26)	Network Associates Coliseum	47,574	47–59	L1

August: 12–16 (Home: 8–10; Away: 4–6)

#	Date	Opponent	Score	Win	Loss	Save	Stadium	Attendance	Record	Streak
107	August 1	@ Mariners	6–10	Nelson (2–2)	**DePaula** (1–1)	—	Safeco Field	45,590	47–60	L2
108	August 2	@ Mariners	1–3	Moyer (11–4)	**Báez** (8–8)	Sasaki (29)	Safeco Field	45,995	47–61	L3
109	August 3	@ Mariners	4–12	Garcia (12–7)	**Wright** (0–2)	—	Safeco Field	46,219	47–62	L4
110	August 4	@ Mariners	10–8	**Westbrook** (1–1)	Sasaki (2–5)	**Wohlers** (3)	Safeco Field	46,120	48–62	W1
111	August 6	Devil Rays	4–2	**Nagy** (1–2)	Sosa (1–5)	**Wohlers** (4)	**Jacobs Field**	35,302	49–62	W2
112	August 7	Devil Rays	6–2	**Sabathia** (7–9)	Sturtze (1–12)	—	**Jacobs Field**	37,888	50–62	W3
113	August 8	Devil Rays	2–4	Wilson (5–7)	**Báez** (8–9)	Yan (15)	**Jacobs Field**	29,973	50–63	L1
114	August 9	Rangers	2–3	Rogers (12–6)	**Wohlers** (1–2)	Cordero (4)	**Jacobs Field**	41,019	50–64	L2
115	August 10	Rangers	4–3	**Wickman** (1–3)	Kolb (2–1)	—	**Jacobs Field**	37,753	51–64	W1
116	August 11	Rangers	5–11	Myette (1–4)	**Nagy** (1–3)	—	**Jacobs Field**	36,789	51–65	L1
117	August 13	@ Devil Rays	9–5	**Sabathia** (8–9)	Sturtze (1–13)	**Wohlers** (5)	Tropicana Field	11,779	52–65	W1
118	August 14	@ Devil Rays	6–4	**Báez** (9–9)	Wilson (5–8)	**Wohlers** (6)	Tropicana Field	10,455	53–65	W2
119	August 15	@ Devil Rays	3–4	Harper (5–6)	**Wohlers** (1–3)	—	Tropicana Field	10,778	53–66	L1
120	August 16	@ Angels	4–5	Lackey (5–2)	**Drese** (9–9)	Percival (29)	Edison International Field of Anaheim	41,356	53–67	L2
121	August 17	@ Angels	9–4	**Sadler** (1–0)	Washburn (15–4)	—	Edison International Field of Anaheim	39,866	54–67	W1
122	August 18	@ Angels	1–4	Appier (11–9)	**Sabathia** (8–10)	Percival (30)	Edison International Field of Anaheim	41,059	54–68	L1
123	August 19	Athletics	1–8	Hudson (10–9)	**Báez** (9–10)	—	**Jacobs Field**	27,696	54–69	L2
124	August 20	Athletics	3–6	Harang (5–3)	**Westbrook** (1–2)	Koch (32)	**Jacobs Field**	27,527	54–70	L3
125	August 21	Athletics	0–6	Lidle (7–9)	**Rodríguez** (0–1)	—	**Jacobs Field**	26,916	54–71	L4
126	August 22	Athletics	3–9	Mulder (15–7)	**Phillips** (1–2)	Bradford (2)	**Jacobs Field**	27,759	54–72	L5
127	August 23	Mariners	4–2	**Wohlers** (2–3)	Baldwin (7–10)	—	**Jacobs Field**	33,525	55–72	W1
128	August 24	Mariners	5–3	**Mulholland** (2–0)	Creek (2–2)	—	**Jacobs Field**	38,086	56–72	W2
129	August 25	Mariners	4–12	Garcia (14–9)	**Westbrook** (1–3)	—	**Jacobs Field**	36,402	56–73	L1
130	August 26	Tigers	8–2	**Rodríguez** (1–1)	Sparks (8–13)	—	**Jacobs Field**	24,344	57–73	W1
131	August 27	Tigers	5–8	Redman (8–12)	**Phillips** (1–3)	Acevedo (27)	**Jacobs Field**	24,375	57–74	L1
132	August 28	Tigers	2–1	**Sabathia** (9–10)	Powell (1–4)	**Báez** (1)	**Jacobs Field**	25,158	58–74	W1
133	August 30	Red Sox	5–15	Lowe (18–6)	**Wright** (0–3)	—	**Jacobs Field**	31,986	58–75	L1
134	August 31	Red Sox	8–7	**Báez** (10–10)	Howry (3–4)	—	**Jacobs Field**	37,908	59–75	W1

September: 15–13 (Home: 5–6; Away: 10–7)

#	Date	Opponent	Score	Win	Loss	Save	Stadium	Attendance	Record	Streak
135	September 1	Red Sox	1–7	Wakefield (8–5)	**Nagy** (1–4)	—	**Jacobs Field**	34,799	59–76	L1
136	September 2	@ Tigers	11–1	**Sabathia** (10–10)	Powell (1–5)	—	Comerica Park	18,722	60–76	W1
137	September 3	@ Tigers	0–4	Van Hekken (1–0)	**Mulholland** (2–1)	—	Comerica Park	11,635	60–77	L1
138	September 4	@ Tigers	9–3	**Wright** (1–3)	Maroth (5–7)	—	Comerica Park	12,715	61–77	W1
139	September 5	@ White Sox	11–6	**Rodríguez** (2–1)	Glover (7–7)	—	Comiskey Park	12,667	62–77	W2
140	September 6	@ White Sox	9–7	**Burba** (5–5)	Buehrle (17–10)	**Báez** (2)	Comiskey Park	17,131	63–77	W3
141	September 7	@ White Sox	4–2	**Sabathia** (11–10)	Garland (10–11)	**Wohlers** (7)	Comiskey Park	16,622	64–77	W4
142	September 8	@ White Sox	6–7	Osuna (8–2)	**Báez** (10–11)	—	Comiskey Park	15,067	64–78	L1
143	September 9	Blue Jays	9–11	Bowles (1–1)	**Sadler** (1–1)	Escobar (30)	**Jacobs Field**	28,567	64–79	L2
144	September 10	Blue Jays	4–5	Bowles (2–1)	**Wohlers** (2–4)	Escobar (31)	**Jacobs Field**	24,312	64–80	L3
145	September 11	Blue Jays	5–6 (11)	Cassidy (1–4)	**Elder** (0–1)	Kershner (1)	**Jacobs Field**	26,609	64–81	L4
146	September 12	Twins	5–4	**Riggan** (2–1)	Mays (3–7)	**Báez** (3)	**Jacobs Field**	28,649	65–81	W1
147	September 13	Twins	12–5	**Mulholland** (3–1)	Milton (13–9)	—	**Jacobs Field**	30,421	66–81	W2
148	September 14	Twins	2–3	Reed (15–7)	**Sadler** (1–2)	Guerrero (41)	**Jacobs Field**	32,330	66–82	L1
149	September 15	Twins	0–5	Lohse (13–8)	**Lee** (0–1)	—	**Jacobs Field**	28,061	66–83	L2
150	September 16 (1)	@ Red Sox	1–6	Martinez (19–4)	**Rodríguez** (2–2)	—	Fenway Park	30,023	66–84	L3
151	September 16 (2)	@ Red Sox	7–1	**Tallet** (1–0)	Castillo (5–15)	—	Fenway Park	31,203	67–84	W1
152	September 17	@ Red Sox	2–4	Wakefield (11–5)	**Sabathia** (11–11)	Urbina (36)	Fenway Park	31,760	67–85	L1
153	September 18	@ Red Sox	6–4	**Riske** (2–2)	Embree (3–6)	**Báez** (4)	Fenway Park	31,829	68–85	W1
154	September 20	@ Royals	6–2	**Davis** (1–0)	Obermueller (0–1)	**Báez** (5)	Kauffman Stadium	13,271	69–85	W2
155	September 21	@ Royals	2–3	Grimsley (4–6)	**Mulholland** (3–2)	—	Kauffman Stadium	15,446	69–86	L1
156	September 22	@ Royals	6–5	**Sabathia** (12–11)	Grimsley (4–7)	**Báez** (6)	Kauffman Stadium	11,177	70–86	W1
157	September 24	@ Twins	3–4	Hawkins (5–0)	**Elder** (0–2)	—	Hubert H. Humphrey Metrodome	21,634	70–87	L1
158	September 25	@ Twins	5–7 (12)	Romero (9–2)	**Maurer** (0–1)	—	Hubert H. Humphrey Metrodome	15,314	70–88	L2
159	September 26	@ Twins	8–4	**Drese** (10–9)	Jackson (2–3)	—	Hubert H. Humphrey Metrodome	17,772	71–88	W1
160	September 27	Royals	4–3	**Sabathia** (13–11)	Obermueller (0–2)	—	**Jacobs Field**	27,706	72–88	W2
161	September 28	Royals	6–5 (10)	**Wohlers** (3–4)	MacDougal (0–1)	—	**Jacobs Field**	31,428	73–88	W3
162	September 29	Royals	7–3	**Wright** (2–3)	Mullen (4–5)	—	**Jacobs Field**	32,018	74–88	W4

Legend: = Win = Loss = Postponement
Bold = Indians team member

== Player stats ==
=== Batting ===
==== Starters by position ====
Note: Pos = Position; G = Games played; AB = At bats; R = Runs scored; H = Hits; 2B = Doubles; 3B = Triples; HR = Home runs; RBI = Runs batted in; AVG = Batting average; SB = Stolen bases

Pos	Player	G	AB	R	H	2B	3B	HR	RBI	AVG	SB
C	Einar Díaz	102	320	34	66	19	0	2	16	.206	0
1B	Jim Thome	147	480	101	146	19	2	52	118	.304	1
2B	Ricky Gutiérrez	94	353	38	97	13	0	4	38	.275	0
3B	Travis Fryman	118	397	42	86	14	3	11	55	.217	0
SS	Omar Vizquel	151	582	85	160	31	5	14	72	.275	18
LF	Russell Branyan	50	161	16	33	4	0	8	17	.205	1
CF	Milton Bradley	98	325	48	81	18	3	9	38	.249	6
RF	Matt Lawton	114	416	71	98	19	2	15	57	.236	8
DH	Ellis Burks	138	518	92	156	28	0	32	91	.301	2

==== Other batters ====
Note: G = Games played; AB = At bats; R = Runs scored; H = Hits; 2B = Doubles; 3B = Triples; HR = Home runs; RBI = Runs batted in; AVG = Batting average; SB = Stolen bases

Player	G	AB	R	H	2B	3B	HR	RBI	AVG	SB
Chad Allen	5	10	0	1	1	0	0	0	.100	0
Brady Anderson	34	80	4	13	4	0	1	5	.163	4
Bruce Aven	7	17	1	2	0	0	0	0	.118	1
Josh Bard	24	90	9	20	5	0	3	12	.222	0
Ben Broussard	39	112	10	27	4	0	4	9	.241	0
Jolbert Cabrera	38	72	5	8	1	0	0	7	.111	1
Wil Cordero	6	18	1	4	0	0	0	1	.222	0
Coco Crisp	32	127	16	33	9	2	1	9	.260	4
Todd Dunwoody	2	6	0	0	0	0	0	0	.000	0
Karim García	51	197	29	59	8	0	16	52	.299	0
Greg LaRocca	21	52	12	14	3	1	0	4	.269	1
Chris Magruder	87	258	34	56	15	1	6	29	.217	2
Víctor Martínez	12	32	2	9	1	0	1	5	.281	0
John McDonald	93	264	35	66	11	3	1	12	.250	3
Eddie Pérez	42	117	6	25	9	0	0	4	.214	0
Brandon Phillips	11	31	5	8	3	1	0	4	.258	0
Bill Selby	65	159	15	34	7	2	6	21	.214	0
Earl Snyder	18	55	5	11	2	0	1	4	.200	0
Lee Stevens	53	153	22	34	7	1	5	26	.222	0

Note: Pitchers' hitting stats are not included above.

=== Pitching ===
==== Starting pitchers ====
Note: W = Wins; L = Losses; ERA = Earned run average; G = Games pitched; GS = Games started; IP = Innings pitched; H = Hits allowed; R = Runs allowed; ER = Earned runs allowed; BB = Walks allowed; K = Strikeouts

Player	W	L	ERA	G	GS	IP	H	R	ER	BB	K
CC Sabathia	13	11	4.37	33	33	210.0	198	109	102	88	149
Ryan Drese	10	9	6.55	26	26	137.1	176	104	100	62	102
Bartolo Colón	10	4	2.55	16	16	116.1	104	37	33	31	75
Chuck Finley	4	11	4.44	18	18	105.1	114	56	52	48	91
Jason Phillips	1	3	4.97	8	6	41.2	41	24	23	20	23
Ricardo Rodríguez	2	2	5.66	7	7	41.1	40	27	26	18	24
Jaret Wright	2	3	15.71	8	6	18.1	40	34	32	19	12
Brian Tallet	1	0	1.50	2	2	12.0	9	3	2	4	5
Cliff Lee	0	1	1.74	2	2	10.1	6	2	2	8	6

==== Other pitchers ====
Note: W = Wins; L = Losses; ERA = Earned run average; G = Games pitched; GS = Games started; SV = Saves; IP = Innings pitched; H = Hits allowed; R = Runs allowed; ER = Earned runs allowed; BB = Walks allowed; K = Strikeouts

Player	W	L	ERA	G	GS	SV	IP	H	R	ER	BB	K
Danys Báez	10	11	4.41	39	26	6	165.1	160	84	81	82	130
Charles Nagy	1	4	8.88	19	7	0	48.2	76	51	48	13	22
Terry Mulholland	3	2	4.60	16	3	0	47.0	56	27	24	14	21
Jake Westbrook	1	3	5.83	11	4	0	41.2	50	30	27	12	20
Dave Burba	1	0	4.50	12	3	0	34.0	30	20	17	17	25
Jason Davis	1	0	1.84	3	2	0	14.2	12	3	3	4	11
Roy Smith	0	0	3.00	4	1	0	6.0	9	4	2	5	2

==== Relief pitchers ====
Note: W = Wins; L = Losses; ERA = Earned run average; G = Games pitched;SV = Saves; IP = Innings pitched; H = Hits allowed; R = Runs allowed; ER = Earned runs allowed; BB = Walks allowed; K = Strikeouts

Player	W	L	ERA	G	SV	IP	H	R	ER	BB	K
Bob Wickman	1	3	4.46	36	20	34.1	42	22	17	10	36
Mark Wohlers	3	4	4.79	64	7	71.1	71	41	38	26	46
David Riske	2	2	5.26	51	1	51.1	49	32	30	35	65
Ricardo Rincón	1	4	4.79	46	0	35.2	36	21	19	8	30
Paul Shuey	3	0	2.41	39	0	37.1	31	11	10	10	39
Chad Paronto	0	2	4.04	29	0	35.2	34	19	16	11	23
Jerrod Riggan	2	1	7.64	29	0	33.0	53	28	28	18	22
Dave Elder	0	2	3.13	15	0	23.0	18	10	8	14	23
Carl Sadler	1	2	4.43	24	0	20.1	15	10	10	11	23
Heath Murray	0	2	7.50	9	0	12.0	12	10	10	7	11
Jason Beverlin	0	0	7.36	4	0	7.1	9	7	6	4	9
Sean DePaula	1	1	12.79	5	0	6.1	11	9	9	3	8
Alex Herrera	0	0	0.00	5	0	5.1	3	0	0	1	5
Dave Maurer	0	1	13.50	2	0	1.1	3	2	2	0	0
Nerio Rodríguez	0	0	0.00	1	0	0.1	0	0	0	0	0

== Awards and honors ==
- Jim Thome, Roberto Clemente Award

All-Star Game

== Minor league affiliates ==
Classification level	Team	League
AAA	Buffalo Bisons	International League
AA	Akron Aeros	Eastern League
Advanced A	Kinston Indians	Carolina League
A	Columbus RedStixx	South Atlantic League
Short Season A	Mahoning Valley Scrappers	New York–Penn League
Rookie	Burlington Indians	Appalachian League
