= 2002 Boston Red Sox season =

Major League Baseball season

2002 Boston Red Sox
- League: American League
- Division: East
- Ballpark: Fenway Park
- City: Boston, Massachusetts
- Record: 93–69 (.574)
- Divisional place: 2nd
- Owners: John W. Henry (New England Sports Ventures)
- President: Larry Lucchino
- General manager: Mike Port
- Manager: Grady Little
- Television: WFXT (Sean McDonough, Jerry Remy); NESN (Don Orsillo, Jerry Remy)
- Radio: WEEI (Jerry Trupiano, Joe Castiglione); WLYN (J.P. Villaman, Juan Oscar Baez, Uri Berenguer, & Luis Tiant)
- Stats: ESPN.com; Baseball Reference

The 2002 Boston Red Sox season was the 102nd season in the franchise's Major League Baseball history. The Red Sox finished second in the American League East with a record of 93 wins and 69 losses, 10 1/2 games behind the New York Yankees. The Red Sox did not qualify for the postseason, as the AL wild card went to the Anaheim Angels, who had finished second in the American League West with a record of 99–63.

== Offseason ==
- October 9, 2001: Craig Grebeck was released by the Boston Red Sox.
- December 21, 2001: Johnny Damon signed a four-year, $31 million contract to join the Boston Red Sox.
- February 13, 2002: Rickey Henderson signed with the Boston Red Sox.

== Regular season ==
- In May 2002, former Red Sox clubhouse staffer Donald James Fitzpatrick pleaded guilty to charges that he sexually abused several young boys at the team's spring training facility in Winter Haven, Florida.
- Martínez pitched the first immaculate inning in franchise history, striking out all three Seattle Mariners batters on a total of nine pitches in the first inning on May 18.
- Seven Red Sox players were voted on to the American League roster for the 2002 MLB All-Star Game played in Milwaukee at Miller Park. Pitcher Derek Lowe, left fielder Manny Ramirez and third baseman Shea Hillenbrand started the game, while pitchers Pedro Martínez and Ugueth Urbina joined shortstop Nomar Garciaparra and outfielder Johnny Damon as reserves.
- Pedro Martínez became the first major league player to win 20 games in one season but pitch less than 200 innings.

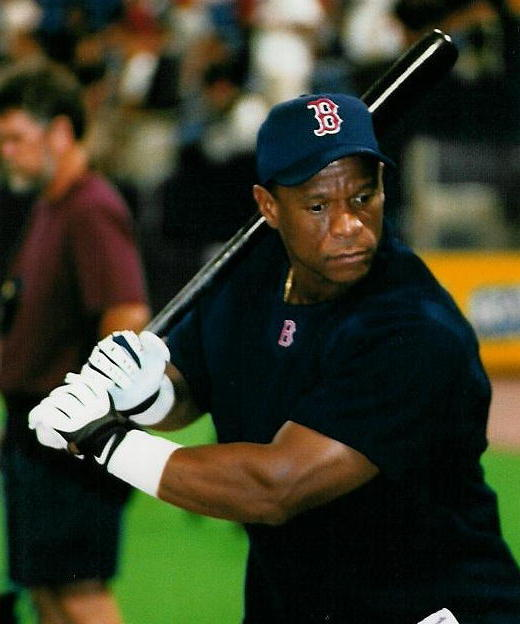
Rickey Henderson with Boston in 2002

=== Season standings ===
AL East
Team	W	L	Pct.	GB	Home	Road
New York Yankees	103	58	.640	—	52‍–‍28	51‍–‍30
Boston Red Sox	93	69	.574	10½	42‍–‍39	51‍–‍30
Toronto Blue Jays	78	84	.481	25½	42‍–‍39	36‍–‍45
Baltimore Orioles	67	95	.414	36½	34‍–‍47	33‍–‍48
Tampa Bay Devil Rays	55	106	.342	48	30‍–‍51	25‍–‍55

=== American League Wild Card ===
Division leaders
Team	W	L	Pct.
New York Yankees	103	58	.640
Minnesota Twins	94	67	.584
Oakland Athletics	103	59	.636

Wild Card team (Top team qualifies for postseason)
Team	W	L	Pct.	GB
Anaheim Angels	99	63	.611	—
Boston Red Sox	93	69	.574	6
Seattle Mariners	93	69	.574	6
Chicago White Sox	81	81	.500	18
Toronto Blue Jays	78	84	.481	21
Cleveland Indians	74	88	.457	25
Texas Rangers	72	90	.444	27
Baltimore Orioles	67	95	.414	32
Kansas City Royals	62	100	.383	37
Detroit Tigers	55	106	.342	43½
Tampa Bay Devil Rays	55	106	.342	43½

=== Record vs. opponents ===
2002 American League record Source: MLB Standings Grid – 2002
Team	ANA	BAL	BOS	CWS	CLE	DET	KC	MIN	NYY	OAK	SEA	TB	TEX	TOR	NL
Anaheim	—	7–2	3–4	6–3	6–3	8–1	6–3	4–5	3–4	9–11	9–10	8–1	12–7	7–2	11–7
Baltimore	2–7	—	6–13	3–4	1–5	2–4	7–0	5–1	6–13	4–5	5–4	10–9	3–6	4–15	9–9
Boston	4–3	13–6	—	2–4	5–4	5–4	4–2	3–3	9–10	6–3	4–5	16–3	4–3	13–6	5–13
Chicago	3–6	4–3	4–2	—	9–10	12–7	11–8	8–11	2–4	2–7	5–4	4–3	5–4	4–2	8–10
Cleveland	3–6	5–1	4–5	10–9	—	10–9	9–10	8–11	3–6	2–5	3–4	4–2	4–5	3–3	6–12
Detroit	1–8	4–2	4–5	7–12	9–10	—	9–10	4–14	1–8	1–6	2–5	2–4	5–4	0–6	6–12
Kansas City	3–6	0–7	2–4	8–11	10–9	10–9	—	5–14	1–5	1–8	3–6	4–2	7–2	3–4	5–13
Minnesota	5–4	1–5	3–3	11–8	11–8	14–4	14–5	—	0–6	3–6	5–4	5–2	6–3	6–1	10–8
New York	4–3	13–6	10–9	4–2	6–3	8–1	5–1	6–0	—	5–4	4–5	13–5	4–3	10–9	11–7
Oakland	11–9	5–4	3–6	7–2	5–2	6–1	8–1	6–3	4–5	—	8–11	8–1	13–6	3–6	16–2
Seattle	10–9	4–5	5–4	4–5	4–3	5–2	6–3	4–5	5–4	11–8	—	5–4	13–7	6–3	11–7
Tampa Bay	1–8	9–10	3–16	3–4	2–4	4–2	2–4	2–5	5–13	1–8	4–5	—	4–5	8–11	7–11
Texas	7–12	6–3	3–4	4–5	5–4	4–5	2–7	3–6	3–4	6–13	7–13	5–4	—	8–1	9–9
Toronto	2–7	15–4	6–13	2–4	3–3	6–0	4–3	1–6	9–10	6–3	3–6	11–8	1–8	—	9–9

Red Sox vs. National League
Team	NL West					
Team	ARI	COL	LAD	SDP	SFG	ATL
Boston	0–3	2–1	0–3	2–1	—	1–5

=== Transactions ===
- April 27, 2002: Wayne Gomes was signed as a free agent with the Boston Red Sox.
- June 26, 2002: Alan Embree was traded by the San Diego Padres with Andy Shibilo (minors) to the Boston Red Sox for Dan Giese and Brad Baker (minors).
- July 30, 2002: Cliff Floyd was traded by the Montreal Expos to the Boston Red Sox for Sun-Woo Kim and Seung Song (minors).

=== Opening Day lineup ===
18	Johnny Damon	CF
30	José Offerman	DH
5	Nomar Garciaparra	SS
24	Manny Ramírez	LF
22	Tony Clark	1B
7	Trot Nixon	RF
29	Shea Hillenbrand	3B
33	Jason Varitek	C
13	Rey Sánchez	2B
45	Pedro Martínez	P

=== Roster ===
2002 Boston Red Sox
Roster
Pitchers: 44 Rolando Arrojo; 17 Willie Banks; 19 John Burkett; 37 Frank Castillo; 43 Alan Embree; 15 Casey Fossum; 34 Rich Garcés; 61 Wayne Gomes; 53 Josh Hancock; 56 Chris Haney; 31 Dustin Hermanson; 46 Bob Howry; 47 Sun-Woo Kim; 32 Derek Lowe - All Star starter; 45 Pedro Martínez – All Star; 36 Darren Oliver; 41 Ugueth Urbina – All Star; 49 Tim Wakefield	Catchers: 38 Kevin Brown; 28 Doug Mirabelli; 33 Jason Varitek; Infielders: 2 Shane Andrews; 22 Tony Clark; 23 Brian Daubach; 5 Nomar Garciaparra – All Star; 29 Shea Hillenbrand – All Star starter; 26 Lou Merloni; 58 Bry Nelson; 30 José Offerman; 52 Freddy Sanchez; 13 Rey Sánchez	Outfielders: 50 Benny Agbayani; 18 Johnny Damon – All Star; 12 Cliff Floyd; 35 Rickey Henderson; 7 Trot Nixon; 24 Manny Ramirez – All Star starter; Designated hitters: 10 Carlos Baerga; 46 Juan Díaz	Manager: 3 Grady Little; Coaches: 40 Tony Cloninger (Pitching); 39 Mike Cubbage (Third Base); 25 Dwight Evans (Hitting); 51 Tommy Harper (First Base); 16 Bob Kipper (Bullpen); 60 Dana LeVangie (Bullpen catcher); 20 Mike Stanley (Bench)

== Player stats ==
=== Batting ===
Note: Pos = Position; G = Games played; AB = At bats; H = Hits; Avg. = Batting average; HR = Home runs; RBI = Runs batted in; SB = Stolen bases

==== Starters by position ====
Pos	Player	G	AB	H	Avg.	HR	RBI	SB
C	Jason Varitek	132	467	124	.266	10	61	4
1B	Tony Clark	90	275	57	.207	3	29	0
2B	Rey Sánchez	107	357	102	.286	1	38	2
3B	Shea Hillenbrand	156	634	186	.293	18	83	4
SS	Nomar Garciaparra	156	635	197	.310	24	120	5
LF	Manny Ramírez	120	436	152	.349	33	107	0
CF	Johnny Damon	154	623	178	.286	14	63	31
RF	Trot Nixon	152	532	136	.256	24	94	4
DH	Carlos Baerga	73	182	52	.286	2	19	6

==== Other batters ====
Note: G = Games played; AB = At bats; H = Hits; Avg. = Batting average; HR = Home runs; RBI = Runs batted in; SB = Stolen bases

Player	G	AB	H	Avg.	HR	RBI	SB
Brian Daubach	137	444	118	.266	20	78	2
José Offerman	72	237	55	.232	4	27	8
Lou Merloni	84	194	48	.247	4	18	1
Rickey Henderson	72	179	40	.223	5	16	8
Cliff Floyd	47	171	54	.316	7	18	4
Doug Mirabelli	57	151	34	.225	7	25	0
Benny Agbayani	13	37	11	.297	0	8	0
Bry Nelson	25	34	9	.265	0	2	1
Freddy Sanchez	12	16	3	.188	0	2	0
Shane Andrews	7	13	1	.077	0	0	0
Juan Díaz	4	7	2	.286	1	2	0
Kevin Brown	2	1	0	.000	0	0	0

=== Pitching ===
==== Starting pitchers ====
Note: G = Games pitched; GS = Games started; IP = Innings pitched; W = Wins; L = Losses; ERA = Earned run average; SO = Strikeouts

Player	G	GS	IP	W	L	ERA	SO
Derek Lowe	32	32	219.2	21	8	2.58	127
Pedro Martinez	30	30	199.1	20	4	2.26	239
John Burkett	29	29	173.0	13	8	4.53	124

==== Other pitchers ====
Note: G = Games pitched; GS = Games started; IP = Innings pitched; W = Wins; L = Losses; SV = Saves; ERA = Earned run average; SO = Strikeouts

Player	G	GS	IP	W	L	SV	ERA	SO
Tim Wakefield	45	15	163.1	11	5	3	2.81	134
Frank Castillo	36	23	163.1	6	15	1	5.07	112
Casey Fossum	41	12	106.2	5	4	1	3.46	101
Rolando Arrojo	29	8	81.1	4	3	1	4.98	51
Darren Oliver	14	9	58.0	4	5	0	4.66	32
Josh Hancock	3	1	7.1	0	1	0	3.68	6

==== Relief pitchers ====
Note: G = Games pitched; GS = Games started; IP = Innings pitched; W = Wins; L = Losses; SV = Saves; ERA = Earned run average; SO = Strikeouts

Player	G	GS	IP	W	L	SV	ERA	SO
Ugueth Urbina	61	0	60.0	1	6	40	3.00	71
Willie Banks	29	0	39.0	2	1	1	3.23	26
Alan Embree	32	0	33.1	1	2	2	2.97	43
Chris Haney	24	0	30.0	0	0	1	4.20	15
Sun-woo Kim	15	2	29.0	2	0	0	7.45	18
Dustin Hermanson	12	1	22.0	1	1	0	7.97	13
Wayne Gomes	20	0	21.1	1	2	1	4.64	15
Rich Garcés	26	0	21.1	0	1	0	6.59	16
Bob Howry	20	0	18.0	1	3	0	5.00	14

== Game log ==
Red Sox Win	Red Sox Loss	Game postponed

2002 Boston Red Sox Season Game Log: 93–69 (Home: 42–39; Away: 51–30)
April: 16–7

#	Date	Opponent	Score	Win	Loss	Save	Stadium	Attendance	Record	Streak
1	April 1	Blue Jays	11–12	Escobar (1–0)	Urbina (0–1)	—	Fenway Park	33,520	0–1	L1
—	April 3	Blue Jays	Postponed (rain). Makeup date July 2.							
2	April 5	@ Orioles	3–0	Lowe (1–0)	Towers (0–1)	Urbina (1)	Camden Yards	31,261	1–1	W1
3	April 6	@ Orioles	4–2	Fossum (1–0)	Erickson (1–1)	Urbina (2)	Camden Yards	34,978	2–1	W2
4	April 7	@ Orioles	4–1	Martínez (1–0)	Maduro (0–1)	Urbina (3)	Camden Yards	33,790	3–1	W3
5	April 9	Royals	8–4	Wakefield (1–0)	Reichert (0–2)	—	Fenway Park	31,115	4–1	W4
6	April 10	Royals	2–6	Byrd (2–0)	Lowe (1–1)	Bailey (1)	Fenway Park	33,376	4–2	L1
7	April 11	Royals	5–8	Grimsley (1–0)	Urbina (0–2)	—	Fenway Park	32,953	4–3	L2
8	April 12	Yankees	3–2	Oliver (1–0)	Hernández (1–1)	Urbina (4)	Fenway Park	32,812	5–3	W1
9	April 13	Yankees	7–6	Arrojo (1–0)	Rivera (0–1)	Urbina (5)	Fenway Park	33,756	6–3	W2
10	April 14	Yankees	2–6	Mussina (3–0)	Wakefield (1–1)	Rivera (5)	Fenway Park	33,742	6–4	L1
11	April 15	Yankees	4–3	Lowe (2–1)	Pettitte (1–1)	Urbina (6)	Fenway Park	33,864	7–4	W1
12	April 16	@ Blue Jays	14–3	Castillo (1–0)	Lyon (0–2)	Arrojo (1)	SkyDome	16,069	8–4	W2
13	April 17	@ Blue Jays	10–4	Oliver (2–0)	Eyre (1–2)	—	SkyDome	16,572	9–4	W3
14	April 19	@ Royals	4–0	Martínez (2–0)	George (0–1)	—	Kauffman Stadium	24,456	10–4	W4
—	April 20	@ Royals	Postponed (rain). Makeup date April 21.							
15	April 21 (1)	@ Royals	12–2	Burkett (1–0)	Reichert (0–3)	Wakefield (1)	Kauffman Stadium	—	11–4	W5
16	April 21 (2)	@ Royals	8–7	Lowe (3–1)	Rekar (0–1)	Urbina (7)	Kauffman Stadium	17,289	12–4	W6
17	April 23	@ Orioles	5–7	Erickson (2–2)	Castillo (1–1)	Julio (2)	Camden Yards	26,301	12–5	L1
18	April 24	@ Orioles	3–5	López (2–0)	Oliver (2–1)	Julio (3)	Camden Yards	29,004	12–6	L2
19	April 25	@ Orioles	7–0	Martínez (3–0)	Maduro (1–2)	—	Camden Yards	31,353	13–6	W1
20	April 26	Devil Rays	4–2	Burkett (2–0)	Wilson (1–2)	Urbina (8)	Fenway Park	32,292	14–6	W2
21	April 27	Devil Rays	10–0	Lowe (4–1)	James (0–2)	—	Fenway Park	32,387	15–6	W3
—	April 28	Devil Rays	Postponed (rain). Makeup date July 23.							
22	April 29	Orioles	3–5	López (3–0)	Castillo (1–2)	Julio (4)	Fenway Park	31,177	15–7	L1
23	April 30	Orioles	4–0	Oliver (3–1)	Maduro (1–3)	—	Fenway Park	31,571	16–7	W1

May: 20–8

#	Date	Opponent	Score	Win	Loss	Save	Stadium	Attendance	Record	Streak
24	May 1	Orioles	15–3	Martínez (4–0)	Douglass (0–1)	—	Fenway Park	33,274	17–7	W2
25	May 3	@ Devil Rays	3–2	Fossum (2–0)	Colomé (1–3)	Urbina (9)	Tropicana Field	12,583	18–7	W3
26	May 4	@ Devil Rays	7–5	Kim (1–0)	Zambrano (1–2)	Urbina (10)	Tropicana Field	17,972	19–7	W4
27	May 5	@ Devil Rays	2–0	Castillo (2–2)	Rupe (3–3)	Urbina (11)	Tropicana Field	15,920	20–7	W5
28	May 6	@ Devil Rays	5–3	Oliver (4–1)	Sturtze (0–4)	Wakefield (2)	Tropicana Field	11,564	21–7	W6
29	May 7	@ Athletics	9–7	Arrojo (2–0)	Mecir (1–1)	Urbina (12)	Network Associates Coliseum	19,715	22–7	W7
30	May 8	@ Athletics	12–6	Burkett (3–0)	Hiljus (3–2)	—	Network Associates Coliseum	40,155	23–7	W8
31	May 9	@ Athletics	5–1	Lowe (5–1)	Hudson (3–4)	—	Network Associates Coliseum	18,477	24–7	W9
32	May 10	@ Mariners	2–7	Piñeiro (3–0)	Castillo (2–3)	Soriano (1)	Safeco Field	45,833	24–8	L1
33	May 11	@ Mariners	1–3	Halama (2–0)	Oliver (4–2)	Sasaki (8)	Safeco Field	45,887	24–9	L2
34	May 12	@ Mariners	10–4	Martínez (5–0)	Baldwin (3–3)	—	Safeco Field	45,862	25–9	W1
35	May 14	Athletics	6–2	Burkett (4–0)	Hudson (3–5)	—	Fenway Park	31,404	26–9	W2
36	May 15	Athletics	8–2	Lowe (6–1)	Hiljus (3–3)	—	Fenway Park	32,346	27–9	W3
37	May 16	Athletics	0–5	Zito (4–2)	Castillo (2–4)	—	Fenway Park	33,057	27–10	L1
38	May 17	Mariners	3–6	Franklin (4–1)	Arrojo (2–1)	Sasaki (10)	Fenway Park	33,205	27–11	L2
39	May 18	Mariners	4–1	Martínez (6–0)	Baldwin (3–4)	Urbina (13)	Fenway Park	32,385	28–11	W1
40	May 19	Mariners	3–2	Burkett (5–0)	García (4–4)	Urbina (14)	Fenway Park	32,783	29–11	W2
41	May 20	White Sox	9–0	Lowe (7–1)	Ritchie (3–5)	—	Fenway Park	32,461	30–11	W3
42	May 21	White Sox	3–8	Wright (5–4)	Oliver (4–3)	—	Fenway Park	31,772	30–12	L1
43	May 22	White Sox	0–2	Garland (5–3)	Castillo (2–5)	Foulke (7)	Fenway Park	33,157	30–13	L2
44	May 23	Yankees	3–1	Martínez (7–0)	Lilly (1–4)	Urbina (15)	Fenway Park	33,884	31–13	W1
45	May 24	Yankees	9–8 (11)	Arrojo (3–1)	Karsay (1–2)	—	Fenway Park	34,175	32–13	W2
46	May 25	Yankees	2–3	Mendoza (2–2)	Lowe (7–2)	Rivera (15)	Fenway Park	33,743	32–14	L1
47	May 26	Yankees	5–14	Mussina (7–2)	Oliver (4–4)	—	Fenway Park	34,096	32–15	L2
48	May 27	@ Blue Jays	8–6	Castillo (3–5)	Halladay (5–2)	Urbina (16)	SkyDome	14,108	33–15	W1
49	May 28	@ Blue Jays	6–4	Wakefield (2–1)	Escobar (1–2)	Urbina (17)	SkyDome	13,075	34–15	W2
50	May 29	@ Blue Jays	7–4	Burkett (6–0)	Cassidy (0–1)	Fossum (1)	SkyDome	17,875	35–15	W3
51	May 31	@ Yankees	5–2	Lowe (8–2)	Wells (6–2)	—	Yankee Stadium	52,941	36–15	W4

June: 10–16

#	Date	Opponent	Score	Win	Loss	Save	Stadium	Attendance	Record	Streak
52	June 1	@ Yankees	2–10	Mussina (8–2)	Oliver (4–5)	—	Yankee Stadium	55,699	36–16	L1
53	June 2	@ Yankees	7–1	Castillo (4–5)	Lilly (2–5)	—	Yankee Stadium	55,602	37–16	W1
54	June 3	@ Tigers	6–7 (10)	Acevedo (1–1)	Wakefield (2–2)	—	Comerica Park	12,918	37–17	L1
55	June 4	@ Tigers	10–5	Burkett (7–0)	Lima (1–4)	—	Comerica Park	14,254	38–17	W1
56	June 5	@ Tigers	11–0	Lowe (9–2)	Bernero (1–2)	Haney (1)	Comerica Park	15,537	39–17	W2
57	June 6	@ Tigers	4–3	Arrojo (4–1)	Redman (2–6)	Urbina (18)	Comerica Park	21,992	40–17	W3
58	June 7	Diamondbacks	5–7	Batista (3–3)	Castillo (4–6)	Kim (15)	Fenway Park	32,853	40–18	L1
59	June 8	Diamondbacks	2–3	Schilling (12–1)	Martínez (7–1)	Kim (16)	Fenway Park	33,275	40–19	L2
60	June 9	Diamondbacks	3–7	Helling (6–5)	Burkett (7–1)	—	Fenway Park	32,209	40–20	L3
61	June 10	Rockies	7–3	Lowe (10–2)	Neagle (4–3)	Wakefield (3)	Fenway Park	33,508	41–20	W1
62	June 11	Rockies	1–3	Jennings (8–2)	Fossum (2–1)	Jiménez (17)	Fenway Park	32,340	41–21	L1
63	June 12	Rockies	7–5	Castillo (5–6)	Hampton (3–8)	Urbina (19)	Fenway Park	31,583	42–21	W1
64	June 14	@ Braves	1–2	Hammond (5–2)	Martínez (7–2)	Smoltz (20)	Turner Field	48,922	42–22	L1
65	June 15	@ Braves	2–4	Maddux (7–2)	Burkett (7–2)	Smoltz (21)	Turner Field	50,764	42–23	L2
66	June 16	@ Braves	6–1	Lowe (11–2)	Glavine (11–3)	—	Turner Field	45,666	43–23	W1
67	June 18	@ Padres	4–2	Banks (1–0)	Lawrence (7–4)	Urbina (20)	Qualcomm Stadium	30,212	44–23	W2
68	June 19	@ Padres	2–3	Tomko (4–5)	Castillo (5–7)	Hoffman (19)	Qualcomm Stadium	32,974	44–24	L1
69	June 20	@ Padres	5–0	Martínez (8–2)	Pickford (0–2)	—	Qualcomm Stadium	35,346	45–24	W1
70	June 21	@ Dodgers	2–3	Nomo (7–5)	Burkett (7–3)	Gagné (26)	Dodger Stadium	46,719	45–25	L1
71	June 22	@ Dodgers	4–5	Daal (5–3)	Lowe (11–3)	Gagné (27)	Dodger Stadium	43,833	45–26	L2
72	June 23	@ Dodgers	6–9	Ashby (7–6)	Arrojo (4–2)	—	Dodger Stadium	45,960	45–27	L3
73	June 25	Indians	2–4	Báez (6–5)	Castillo (5–8)	Wickman (18)	Fenway Park	34,064	45–28	L4
74	June 26	Indians	7–4	Martínez (9–2)	Drese (7–6)	Urbina (21)	Fenway Park	32,255	46–28	W1
—	June 27	Indians	Postponed (rain). Makeup date September 26.							
75	June 28	Braves	2–4	Remlinger (4–0)	Wakefield (2–3)	Smoltz (26)	Fenway Park	33,137	46–29	L1
76	June 29	Braves	1–2	Millwood (5–5)	Lowe (11–4)	Smoltz (27)	Fenway Park	32,651	46–30	L2
77	June 30	Braves	3–7 (10)	Remlinger (5–0)	Urbina (0–3)	—	Fenway Park	32,348	46–31	L3

July: 17–12

#	Date	Opponent	Score	Win	Loss	Save	Stadium	Attendance	Record	Streak
78	July 1	Blue Jays	4–0	Martínez (10–2)	Parris (0–2)	—	Fenway Park	33,005	47–31	W1
79	July 2 (1)	Blue Jays	2–1	Banks (2–0)	Eyre (2–4)	Embree (1)	Fenway Park	32,993	48–31	W2
80	July 2 (2)	Blue Jays	6–4	Kim (2–0)	Smith (0–2)	Embree (2)	Fenway Park	32,902	49–31	W3
81	July 3	Blue Jays	5–2	Gomes (1–0)	Politte (3–2)	Urbina (22)	Fenway Park	31,777	50–31	W4
82	July 4	Blue Jays	9–5	Lowe (12–4)	Heredia (0–2)	—	Fenway Park	32,086	51–31	W5
83	July 5	Tigers	5–9	Redman (4–8)	Castillo (5–9)	—	Fenway Park	33,571	51–32	L1
84	July 6	Tigers	8–0	Martínez (11–2)	Maroth (1–3)	—	Fenway Park	32,485	52–32	W1
85	July 7	Tigers	8–9	Farnsworth (2–1)	Garcés (0–1)	Acedevo (14)	Fenway Park	33,297	52–33	L1
86	July 11	@ Blue Jays	10–3	Burkett (8–3)	Walker (3–1)	—	SkyDome	19,494	53–33	W1
87	July 12	@ Blue Jays	0–5	Halladay (10–4)	Lowe (12–5)	—	SkyDome	20,185	53–34	L1
88	July 13	@ Blue Jays	1–4	Carpenter (2–1)	Castillo (5–10)	—	SkyDome	28,112	53–35	L2
89	July 14	@ Blue Jays	5–6	Escobar (5–4)	Urbina (0–4)	—	SkyDome	24,140	53–36	L3
90	July 15	@ Tigers	3–4 (11)	Henríquez (1–0)	Gomes (1–1)	—	Comerica Park	21,687	53–37	L4
91	July 16	@ Tigers	9–4	Burkett (9–3)	Farnsworth (2–2)	—	Comerica Park	21,654	54–37	W1
92	July 17	@ Devil Rays	6–1	Lowe (13–5)	Wilson (2–7)	—	Tropicana Field	15,672	55–37	W2
93	July 18	@ Devil Rays	4–3	Wakefield (3–3)	Yan (5–5)	Urbina (23)	Tropicana Field	22,012	56–37	W3
94	July 19	@ Yankees	4–2	Martínez (12–2)	Mussina (12–4)	Urbina (24)	Yankee Stadium	55,510	57–37	W4
95	July 20	@ Yankees	8–9 (11)	Karsay (5–4)	Gomes (1–2)	—	Yankee Stadium	55,526	57–38	L1
96	July 21	@ Yankees	8–9	Stanton (4–1)	Urbina (0–5)	—	Yankee Stadium	55,581	57–39	L2
97	July 23 (1)	Devil Rays	22–4	Wakefield (4–3)	Sturtze (1–10)	Banks (1)	Fenway Park	33,190	58–39	W1
98	July 23 (2)	Devil Rays	4–5	Zambrano (4–4)	Urbina (0–6)	Yan (13)	Fenway Park	32,729	58–40	L1
99	July 24	Devil Rays	5–9	Colomé (2–5)	Castillo (5–11)	Zambrano (1)	Fenway Park	32,969	58–41	L2
100	July 25	Devil Rays	6–0	Martínez (13–2)	de los Santos (0–2)	—	Fenway Park	33,439	59–41	W1
101	July 26	Orioles	2–9	López (11–3)	Arrojo (4–3)	—	Fenway Park	33,840	59–42	L1
102	July 27	Orioles	4–0	Burkett (10–3)	Ponson (4–5)	—	Fenway Park	33,474	60–42	W1
103	July 28	Orioles	12–3	Lowe (14–5)	Erickson (4–10)	—	Fenway Park	33,371	61–42	W2
104	July 29	@ Angels	4–5	Schoenweis (8–7)	Embree (3–5)	Percival (24)	Edison Field	27,929	61–43	L1
105	July 30	@ Angels	6–0	Martínez (14–2)	Ortiz (9–8)	—	Edison Field	32,812	62–43	W1
106	July 31	@ Angels	2–1	Wakefield (5–3)	Lackey (2–2)	Urbina (25)	Edison Field	28,227	63–43	W2

August: 12–15

#	Date	Opponent	Score	Win	Loss	Save	Stadium	Attendance	Record	Streak
107	August 1	@ Rangers	7–19	Park (4–5)	Burkett (10–4)	—	The Ballpark at Arlington	24,834	63–44	L1
108	August 2	@ Rangers	13–0	Lowe (15–5)	Valdéz (5–8)	—	The Ballpark at Arlington	32,366	64–44	W1
109	August 3	@ Rangers	6–8	Kolb (2–0)	Howry (2–3)	—	The Ballpark at Arlington	44,291	64–45	L1
110	August 4	@ Rangers	11–3	Martínez (15–2)	Myette (0–4)	—	The Ballpark at Arlington	29,359	65–45	W1
111	August 6	Athletics	1–9	Mulder (13–6)	Wakefield (5–4)	—	Fenway Park	34,059	65–46	L1
112	August 7	Athletics	2–3	Harang (4–2)	Burkett (10–5)	Koch (28)	Fenway Park	33,325	65–47	L2
113	August 8	Athletics	4–2	Lowe (16–5)	Zito (15–5)	Urbina (26)	Fenway Park	33,855	66–47	W1
114	August 9	Twins	4–5	Romero (8–1)	Castillo (5–12)	Guardado (34)	Fenway Park	33,973	66–48	L1
115	August 10	Twins	2–0	Martínez (16–2)	Mays (1–4)	Urbina (27)	Fenway Park	32,018	67–48	W1
116	August 11	Twins	3–1	Wakefield (6–4)	Santana (6–4)	Urbina (28)	Fenway Park	33,470	68–48	W2
117	August 13	@ Mariners	3–10	Piñeiro (12–4)	Burkett (10–6)	—	Safeco Field	45,703	68–49	L1
118	August 14	@ Mariners	12–5	Lowe (17–5)	Moyer (12–5)	—	Safeco Field	45,233	69–49	W1
119	August 15	@ Mariners	3–4	García (13–8)	Fossum (2–2)	Sasaki (30)	Safeco Field	45,645	69–50	L1
120	August 16	@ Twins	0–5	Mays (2–4)	Martínez (16–3)	—	Metrodome	35,824	69–51	L2
121	August 17	@ Twins	5–2	Wakefield (7–4)	Santana (6–5)	—	Metrodome	43,345	70–51	W1
122	August 18	@ Twins	2–6	Reed (11–6)	Burkett (10–7)	—	Metrodome	37,196	70–52	L1
123	August 20	Rangers	2–3 (10)	Rodriguez (2–1)	Banks (2–1)	Cordero (5)	Fenway Park	33,742	70–53	L2
124	August 21	Rangers	5–3	Howry (3–3)	Kolb (3–2)	Urbina (29)	Fenway Park	32,746	71–53	W1
125	August 22	Rangers	12–3	Hermanson (1–0)	Reyes (1–2)	Castillo (1)	Fenway Park	33,104	72–53	W2
126	August 23	Angels	4–1	Martínez (17–3)	Washburn (15–5)	Urbina (30)	Fenway Park	33,221	73–53	W3
127	August 24	Angels	0–2	Appier (12–9)	Wakefield (7–5)	Percival (31)	Fenway Park	32,510	73–54	L1
128	August 25	Angels	3–8	Schoeneweis (9–7)	Lowe (17–6)	—	Fenway Park	32,059	73–55	L2
129	August 26	Angels	10–9 (10)	Urbina (1–6)	Shields (3–3)	—	Fenway Park	32,869	74–55	W1
130	August 27	Yankees	0–6	Wells (15–6)	Fossum (2–3)	—	Fenway Park	33,810	74–56	L1
131	August 28	Yankees	0–7	Mussina (16–7)	Martínez (17–4)	—	Fenway Park	33,793	74–57	L2
132	August 30	@ Indians	15–5	Lowe (18–6)	Wright (0–3)	—	Jacobs Field	31,986	75–57	W1
133	August 31	@ Indians	7–8	Báez (10–10)	Howry (3–4)	—	Jacobs Field	37,908	75–58	L1

September: 18–11

#	Date	Opponent	Score	Win	Loss	Save	Stadium	Attendance	Record	Streak
134	September 1	@ Indians	7–1	Wakefield (8–5)	Nagy (1–4)	—	Jacobs Field	34,799	76–58	W1
135	September 2	@ Yankees	8–4	Fossum (3–3)	Mussina (16–8)	—	Yankee Stadium	55,169	77–58	W2
136	September 3	@ Yankees	2–4	Clemens (12–5)	Castillo (5–13)	Stanton (3)	Yankee Stadium	47,318	77–59	L1
137	September 4	@ Yankees	1–3	Pettitte (9–5)	Lowe (18–7)	Karsay (9)	Yankee Stadium	50,006	77–60	L2
138	September 5	Blue Jays	4–5	Miller (7–4)	Hermanson (1–1)	Escobar (29)	Fenway Park	30,021	77–61	L3
139	September 6	Blue Jays	7–2	Wakefield (9–5)	Halladay (15–7)	—	Fenway Park	31,847	78–61	W1
140	September 7	Blue Jays	4–1	Fossum (4–3)	Bowles (0–1)	Urbina (31)	Fenway Park	31,591	79–61	W2
141	September 8	Blue Jays	4–9	Loaiza (8–8)	Castillo (5–14)	—	Fenway Park	31,344	79–62	L1
142	September 9	Devil Rays	6–3	Lowe (19–7)	Sturtze (3–16)	Urbina (32)	Tropicana Field	10,577	80–62	W1
143	September 10	Devil Rays	12–1	Burkett (11–7)	Kennedy (7–11)	—	Tropicana Field	10,891	81–62	W2
144	September 11	Devil Rays	6–3	Martínez (18–4)	Wilson (6–10)	Urbina (33)	Fenway Park	12,415	82–62	W3
145	September 12	Devil Rays	6–3	Wakefield (10–5)	Yan (6–8)	Urbina (34)	Fenway Park	10,149	83–62	W4
146	September 13	Orioles	3–8	López (15–7)	Fossum (4–4)	—	Fenway Park	32,166	83–63	L1
147	September 14	Orioles	6–4	Lowe (20–7)	Hentgen (0–2)	Urbina (35)	Fenway Park	33,123	84–63	W1
148	September 15	Orioles	3–8	Johnson (5–13)	Burkett (11–8)	—	Fenway Park	31,007	84–64	L1
149	September 16 (1)	Indians	6–1	Martínez (19–4)	Rodríguez (2–2)	—	Fenway Park	30,023	85–64	W1
150	September 16 (2)	Indians	1–7	Tallet (1–0)	Castillo (5–15)	—	Fenway Park	31,203	85–65	L1
151	September 17	Indians	4–2	Wakefield (11–5)	Sabathia (11–11)	Urbina (36)	Fenway Park	31,760	86–65	W1
152	September 18	Indians	4–6	Riske (2–2)	Embree (3–6)	Báez (4)	Fenway Park	31,829	86–66	L1
153	September 20	@ Orioles	4–2	Lowe (21–7)	Hentgen (0–3)	Urbina (37)	Camden Yards	32,648	87–66	W1
154	September 21	@ Orioles	3–0	Burkett (12–8)	Johnson (5–14)	Urbina (38)	Camden Yards	43,613	88–66	W2
155	September 22	@ Orioles	13–2	Martínez (20–4)	Ponson (7–8)	—	Camden Yards	30,573	89–66	W3
156	September 23	@ Orioles	5–4	Embree (4–6)	Roberts (5–4)	Gomes (1)	Camden Yards	24,664	90–66	W4
157	September 24	@ White Sox	4–2	Fossum (5–4)	Garland (12–12)	Urbina (39)	Comiskey Park	14,168	91–66	W5
158	September 25	@ White Sox	2–7	Biddle (3–4)	Lowe (21–8)	—	Comiskey Park	13,102	91–67	L1
159	September 26	@ White Sox	2–3	Wright (14–12)	Hancock (0–1)	Foulke (11)	Comiskey Park	12,304	91–68	L2
160	September 27	Devil Rays	6–1	Burkett (13–8)	Wilson (6–12)	—	Fenway Park	32,423	92–68	W1
161	September 28	Devil Rays	6–9	Zambrano (8–8)	Howry (3–5)	Carter (2)	Fenway Park	32,623	92–69	L1
162	September 29	Devil Rays	11–8	Castillo (6–15)	Álvarez (2–3)	Urbina (40)	Fenway Park	32,194	93–69	W1

== Awards and honors ==
- Derek Lowe – AL Pitcher of the Month (April)
- Pedro Martínez – AL Pitcher of the Month (July)
- Manny Ramirez – Silver Slugger Award (DH), AL Player of the Month (September)

All-Star Game

- Johnny Damon, reserve OF (fan vote selection)
- Nomar Garciaparra, reserve SS
- Shea Hillenbrand, starting 3B
- Derek Lowe, starting P
- Pedro Martínez, reserve P (did not attend)
- Manny Ramirez, starting LF
- Ugueth Urbina, reserve P (roster replacement)

== Farm system ==
Level	Team	League	Manager
AAA	Pawtucket Red Sox	International League	Buddy Bailey
AA	Trenton Thunder	Eastern League	Ron Johnson
A-Advanced	Sarasota Red Sox	Florida State League	Billy Gardner Jr.
A	Augusta GreenJackets	South Atlantic League	Arnie Beyeler
A-Short Season	Lowell Spinners	New York–Penn League	Mike Boulanger
Rookie	GCL Red Sox	Gulf Coast League	John Sanders
Rookie	DSL Red Sox	Dominican Summer League	Nelson Norman
Rookie	VSL Red Sox (cooperative)	Venezuelan Summer League	Josman Robles

VSL cooperative was with the Milwaukee Brewers.
