= 2002 New York Yankees season =

Season for the Major League Baseball team the New York Yankees

2002 New York Yankees
- American League East champions
- League: American League
- Division: East
- Ballpark: Yankee Stadium
- City: New York City
- Record: 103–58 (.640)
- Divisional place: 1st
- Owners: George Steinbrenner
- General managers: Brian Cashman
- Managers: Joe Torre
- Television: WCBS-TV; YES Network (Michael Kay, Jim Kaat, Ken Singleton, Bobby Murcer, David Cone, Paul O'Neill)
- Radio: WCBS (AM) (John Sterling, Charley Steiner)

The 2002 New York Yankees season was the 100th season for the Yankees. The team finished with a record of 103–58 finishing 10.5 games ahead of the Boston Red Sox. New York was managed by Joe Torre. The Yankees played at Yankee Stadium. 2002 was a transition year for the Yankees, as they soldiered on without Paul O'Neill, Tino Martinez, Scott Brosius and Chuck Knoblauch, main pieces in the 1990s dynasty. In the playoffs, they lost in the ALDS in 4 games to the Anaheim Angels, marking the 2002 Yankees season a failure as they did not advance to a World Series for the first time since 1997; failing to win their fifth straight pennant; they did not win a World Championship, giving the team a 2-year title drought.

== Offseason ==
- December 7, 2001: David Justice was traded by the Yankees to the New York Mets for Robin Ventura.
- December 13, 2001: John Vander Wal was traded by the San Francisco Giants to the Yankees for Jay Witasick.
- December 13, 2001: Jason Giambi, a free agent, signed a 7-year $120-million deal with the Yankees.
- January 8, 2002: Luis Sojo was signed as a free agent with the New York Yankees.
- January 11, 2002: David Wells was signed as a free agent with the Yankees.
- January 17, 2002: Clay Bellinger was released by the Yankees.
- January 28, 2002: Ron Coomer was signed as a free agent with the Yankees.
- March 27, 2002: Bobby Estalella was released by the Yankees.

=== Broadcasting changes ===
Beginning this season, the newly launched YES Network began airing regular season games, taking over from MSG Network, cable rights holder for these games until the 2001 season. The on-air team of Ken Singleton and Jim Kaat was moved from MSG to YES beginning this season, while Michael Kay joined as play-by-play commentator beginning this season in addition to radio duties, and they also added retired right fielder Paul O'Neill and former Yankees pitcher David Cone as color commentators; in addition, the over-the-air Yankees games were moved from Fox owned and operated station WNYW to CBS owned and operated station WCBS-TV; Bobby Murcer remained as a play-by-play announcer for the games on over-the-air television. Also beginning this season, the radio broadcasts of Yankees games moved from WABC-AM to CBS Radio-owned AM station WCBS-AM which was a sibling to TV over-the-air rights holder WCBS-TV.

== Regular season ==
=== Season standings ===
AL East
Team	W	L	Pct.	GB	Home	Road
New York Yankees	103	58	.640	—	52‍–‍28	51‍–‍30
Boston Red Sox	93	69	.574	10½	42‍–‍39	51‍–‍30
Toronto Blue Jays	78	84	.481	25½	42‍–‍39	36‍–‍45
Baltimore Orioles	67	95	.414	36½	34‍–‍47	33‍–‍48
Tampa Bay Devil Rays	55	106	.342	48	30‍–‍51	25‍–‍55

=== American League Wild Card ===
Division leaders
Team	W	L	Pct.
New York Yankees	103	58	.640
Minnesota Twins	94	67	.584
Oakland Athletics	103	59	.636

Wild Card team (Top team qualifies for postseason)
Team	W	L	Pct.	GB
Anaheim Angels	99	63	.611	—
Boston Red Sox	93	69	.574	6
Seattle Mariners	93	69	.574	6
Chicago White Sox	81	81	.500	18
Toronto Blue Jays	78	84	.481	21
Cleveland Indians	74	88	.457	25
Texas Rangers	72	90	.444	27
Baltimore Orioles	67	95	.414	32
Kansas City Royals	62	100	.383	37
Detroit Tigers	55	106	.342	43½
Tampa Bay Devil Rays	55	106	.342	43½

=== Record vs. opponents ===
2002 American League record Source: MLB Standings Grid – 2002
Team	ANA	BAL	BOS	CWS	CLE	DET	KC	MIN	NYY	OAK	SEA	TB	TEX	TOR	NL
Anaheim	—	7–2	3–4	6–3	6–3	8–1	6–3	4–5	3–4	9–11	9–10	8–1	12–7	7–2	11–7
Baltimore	2–7	—	6–13	3–4	1–5	2–4	7–0	5–1	6–13	4–5	5–4	10–9	3–6	4–15	9–9
Boston	4–3	13–6	—	2–4	5–4	5–4	4–2	3–3	9–10	6–3	4–5	16–3	4–3	13–6	5–13
Chicago	3–6	4–3	4–2	—	9–10	12–7	11–8	8–11	2–4	2–7	5–4	4–3	5–4	4–2	8–10
Cleveland	3–6	5–1	4–5	10–9	—	10–9	9–10	8–11	3–6	2–5	3–4	4–2	4–5	3–3	6–12
Detroit	1–8	4–2	4–5	7–12	9–10	—	9–10	4–14	1–8	1–6	2–5	2–4	5–4	0–6	6–12
Kansas City	3–6	0–7	2–4	8–11	10–9	10–9	—	5–14	1–5	1–8	3–6	4–2	7–2	3–4	5–13
Minnesota	5–4	1–5	3–3	11–8	11–8	14–4	14–5	—	0–6	3–6	5–4	5–2	6–3	6–1	10–8
New York	4–3	13–6	10–9	4–2	6–3	8–1	5–1	6–0	—	5–4	4–5	13–5	4–3	10–9	11–7
Oakland	11–9	5–4	3–6	7–2	5–2	6–1	8–1	6–3	4–5	—	8–11	8–1	13–6	3–6	16–2
Seattle	10–9	4–5	5–4	4–5	4–3	5–2	6–3	4–5	5–4	11–8	—	5–4	13–7	6–3	11–7
Tampa Bay	1–8	9–10	3–16	3–4	2–4	4–2	2–4	2–5	5–13	1–8	4–5	—	4–5	8–11	7–11
Texas	7–12	6–3	3–4	4–5	5–4	4–5	2–7	3–6	3–4	6–13	7–13	5–4	—	8–1	9–9
Toronto	2–7	15–4	6–13	2–4	3–3	6–0	4–3	1–6	9–10	6–3	3–6	11–8	1–8	—	9–9

=== Notable transactions ===
- April 8, 2002: Bill Pulsipher was signed as a free agent with the New York Yankees.
- May 23, 2002: Bill Pulsipher was released by the New York Yankees.
- July 1, 2002: Raúl Mondesí was traded by the Toronto Blue Jays to the New York Yankees for Scott Wiggins.
- July 5, 2002: Ted Lilly was traded as part of a 3-team trade by the New York Yankees with Jason Arnold (minors) and John-Ford Griffin to the Oakland Athletics. The Oakland Athletics sent a player to be named later, Carlos Peña, and Franklyn Germán to the Detroit Tigers. The Detroit Tigers sent Jeff Weaver to the New York Yankees. The Detroit Tigers sent cash to the Oakland Athletics. The Oakland Athletics sent Jeremy Bonderman (August 22, 2002) to the Detroit Tigers to complete the trade.

=== Roster ===
2002 New York Yankees
Roster
Pitchers: 38 Randy Choate; 22 Roger Clemens; 65 Adrian Hernández; 26 Orlando Hernández; 41 Sterling Hitchcock; 31 Steve Karsay; 48 Brandon Knight; 45,43 Ted Lilly; 55 Ramiro Mendoza; 35 Mike Mussina; 46 Andy Pettitte; 42 Mariano Rivera; 29 Mike Stanton; 48 Jay Tessmer; 53 Mike Thurman; 18 Jeff Weaver; 33 David Wells	Catchers: 45 Alberto Castillo; 20 Jorge Posada; 11 Chris Widger; Infielders: 17 Alex Arias; 39 Ron Coomer; 25 Jason Giambi; 57 Drew Henson; 2 Derek Jeter; 36 Nick Johnson; 12 Alfonso Soriano; 19 Robin Ventura; 14 Enrique Wilson	Outfielders: 57 Karim García; 43 Raúl Mondesí; 59 Juan Rivera; 47 Shane Spencer; 18 Marcus Thames; 28 John Vander Wal; 27 Rondell White; 51 Bernie Williams; 17 Gerald Williams	Manager: 6 Joe Torre; Coaches: 53 Rick Down (Hitting); 52 Lee Mazzilli (First Base); 56 Rich Monteleone (Bullpen); 30 Willie Randolph (Third Base); 34 Mel Stottlemyre (Pitching); 54 Don Zimmer (Bench)

=== Game log ===
Legend
Yankees Win	Yankees Loss	Game postponed

2002 Game Log (103–58) Home: 52–28 Away: 51–30
April (17–10) Home: 8–2 Away: 9–8

#	Date	Opponent	Score	Win	Loss	Save	Location	Attendance	Record
1	April 1	@ Orioles	3–10	Erickson (1–0)	Clemens (0–1)	—	Oriole Park at Camden Yards	48,058	0–1
2	April 3	@ Orioles	1–0	Wells (1–0)	Johnson (0–1)	Rivera (1)	Oriole Park at Camden Yards	32,142	1–1
3	April 4	@ Orioles	4–1	Mussina (1–0)	Ponson (0–1)	Rivera (2)	Oriole Park at Camden Yards	33,317	2–1
4	April 5	Devil Rays	4–0	Pettitte (1–0)	Kennedy (0–1)	—	Yankee Stadium	55,771	3–1
5	April 6	Devil Rays	3–0	O. Hernandez (1–0)	Alvarez (0–1)	Rivera (3)	Yankee Stadium	39,093	4–1
6	April 7	Devil Rays	7–2	Clemens (1–1)	Sturtze (0–1)	—	Yankee Stadium	37,343	5–1
7	April 8	@ Blue Jays	16–3	Wells (2–0)	Prokopec (0–1)	—	SkyDome	16,073	6–1
8	April 9	@ Blue Jays	5–2	Mussina (2–0)	Plesac (0–1)	Rivera (4)	SkyDome	18,003	7–1
9	April 10	@ Blue Jays	7–9	Borbon (1–0)	Lilly (0–1)	Escobar (1)	SkyDome	19,124	7–2
10	April 11	@ Blue Jays	3–11	Eyre (1–0)	Clemens (1–2)	—	SkyDome	20,091	7–3
11	April 12	@ Red Sox	2–3	Oliver (1–0)	O. Hernandez (1–1)	Urbina (4)	Fenway Park	32,812	7–4
12	April 13	@ Red Sox	6–7	Arrojo (1–0)	Rivera (0–1)	Urbina (5)	Fenway Park	33,756	7–5
13	April 14	@ Red Sox	6–2	Mussina (3–0)	Wakefield (1–1)	Rivera (5)	Fenway Park	33,742	8–5
14	April 15	@ Red Sox	3–4	Lowe (2–1)	Pettitte (1–1)	Urbina (6)	Fenway Park	33,864	8–6
15	April 16	Orioles	4–5	Bauer (1–0)	Mendoza (0–1)	Julio (1)	Yankee Stadium	33,721	8–7
16	April 17	Orioles	7–1	O. Hernandez (2–1)	Towers (0–3)	—	Yankee Stadium	27,912	9–7
17	April 18	Orioles	8–4	Wells (3–0)	Erickson (1–2)	—	Yankee Stadium	35,212	10–7
18	April 19	Blue Jays	6–5	Rivera (1–1)	File (0–1)	—	Yankee Stadium	36,136	11–7
19	April 20	Blue Jays	4–5 (10)	Plesac (1–1)	Mendoza (0–2)	—	Yankee Stadium	39,265	11–8
20	April 21	Blue Jays	9–2	Clemens (2–2)	Carpenter (0–1)	—	Yankee Stadium	43,309	12–8
21	April 23	@ Athletics	2–1	O. Hernandez (3–1)	Hudson (2–2)	Rivera (6)	Network Associates Coliseum	40,360	13–8
22	April 24	@ Athletics	8–5	Stanton (1–0)	Magnante (0–1)	Rivera (7)	Network Associates Coliseum	54,513	13–9
23	April 25	@ Athletics	2–6	Zito (1–1)	Mussina (3–1)	—	Network Associates Coliseum	31,870	14–9
24	April 26	@ Mariners	7–1	Clemens (3–2)	Baldwin (2–1)	—	Safeco Field	45,814	15–9
25	April 27	@ Mariners	0–1	Garcia (3–2)	Lilly (0–2)	Sasaki (7)	Safeco Field	46,047	15–10
26	April 28	@ Mariners	4–3	Karsay (1–0)	Rhodes (1–1)	Rivera (8)	Safeco Field	46,115	16–10
27	April 30	Athletics	8–2	Wells (4–0)	Zito (1–2)	—	Yankee Stadium	32,888	17–10

May (19–9) Home: 8–7 Away: 11–2

#	Date	Opponent	Score	Win	Loss	Save	Location	Attendance	Record
28	May 1	Athletics	1–4	Hiljus (3–1)	Mussina (3–2)	Koch (6)	Yankee Stadium	31,006	17–11
29	May 2	Athletics	9–2	Clemens (4–2)	Lidle (1–4)	—	Yankee Stadium	30,463	18–11
30	May 3	Mariners	2–6	Garcia (4–2)	Lilly (0–3)	—	Yankee Stadium	47,918	18–12
31	May 4	Mariners	5–9	Nelson (1–0)	Karsay (1–1)	—	Yankee Stadium	52,081	18–13
32	May 5	Mariners	6–10	Pineiro (2–0)	Wells (4–1)	—	Yankee Stadium	48,176	18–14
33	May 7	@ Devil Rays	5–2	Mussina (4–2)	Wilson (1–3)	Rivera (9)	Tropicana Field	15,031	19–14
34	May 8	@ Devil Rays	7–2	Clemens (5–2)	James (0–3)	—	Tropicana Field	15,263	20–14
35	May 9	@ Devil Rays	3–1	O. Hernandez (4–1)	Kennedy (1–3)	Rivera (10)	Tropicana Field	16,013	21–14
36	May 10	@ Twins	5–3	Wells (5–1)	Milton (4–3)	Rivera (11)	Hubert H. Humphrey Metrodome	35,727	22–14
37	May 11	@ Twins	4–2	Stanton (2–0)	Guardado (0–1)	Rivera (12)	Hubert H. Humphrey Metrodome	43,265	23–14
38	May 12	@ Twins	10–4	Mussina (5–2)	Reed (4–2)	—	Hubert H. Humphrey Metrodome	26,165	24–14
39	May 14	Devil Rays	10–3	Clemens (6–2)	Harper (0–1)	—	Yankee Stadium	29,503	25–14
40	May 15	Devil Rays	7–10	Kennedy (2–3)	O. Hernandez (4–2)	Yan (6)	Yankee Stadium	26,571	25–15
41	May 16	Devil Rays	13–0	Wells (6–1)	Rupe (3–5)	—	Yankee Stadium	32,695	26–15
42	May 17	Twins	13–12 (14)	Hitchcock (1–0)	Trombley (0–1)	—	Yankee Stadium	39,470	27–15
43	May 18	Twins	6–2	Lilly (1–3)	Fiore (2–1)	—	Yankee Stadium	46,057	28–15
44	May 19	Twins	3–0	Clemens (7–2)	Kinney (1–4)	Rivera (13)	Yankee Stadium	53,662	29–15
45	May 20	Blue Jays	6–3	Mendoza (1–2)	Heredia (0–1)	Rivera (14)	Yankee Stadium	30,657	30–15
46	May 21	Blue Jays	4–1	Mussina (6–2)	Prokopec (2–6)	Karsay (1)	Yankee Stadium	26,531	31–15
47	May 22	Blue Jays	3–8	Halladay (5–1)	A. Hernandez (0–1)	—	Yankee Stadium	44,284	31–16
48	May 23	@ Red Sox	1–3	Martinez (7–0)	Lilly (1–4)	Urbina (15)	Fenway Park	33,884	31–17
49	May 24	@ Red Sox	8–9 (11)	Arrojo (3–1)	Karsay (1–2)	—	Fenway Park	34,175	31–18
50	May 25	@ Red Sox	3–2	Mendoza (2–2)	Lowe (7–2)	Rivera (15)	Fenway Park	33,743	32–18
51	May 26	@ Red Sox	14–5	Mussina (7–2)	Oliver (4–4)	—	Fenway Park	34,096	33–18
52	May 27	@ White Sox	10–6	Thurman (1–0)	Wright (5–5)	—	Comiskey Park	43,781	34–18
53	May 28	@ White Sox	4–2	Lilly (2–4)	Garland (5–4)	Rivera (16)	Comiskey Park	27,859	35–18
54	May 29	@ White Sox	6–3	Karsay (2–2)	Foulke (0–3)	Rivera (17)	Comiskey Park	27,572	36–18
55	May 31	Red Sox	2–5	Lowe (8–2)	Wells (6–2)	—	Yankee Stadium	52,941	36–19

June (14–12) Home: 8–6 Away: 6–6

#	Date	Opponent	Score	Win	Loss	Save	Location	Attendance	Record
56	June 1	Red Sox	10–2	Mussina (8–2)	Oliver (4–5)	—	Yankee Stadium	55,699	37–19
57	June 2	Red Sox	1–7	Castillo (4–5)	Lilly (2–5)	—	Yankee Stadium	55,602	37–20
58	June 3	Orioles	3–4	Julio (3–4)	Rivera (1–2)	—	Yankee Stadium	31,476	37–21
59	June 4	Orioles	13–5	Mendoza (3–2)	Erickson (3–6)	—	Yankee Stadium	32,214	38–21
60	June 5	Orioles	3–4	Driskill (3–0)	Wells (6–3)	Julio (10)	Yankee Stadium	26,506	38–22
–	June 6	Orioles	Postponed (rain) Rescheduled for September 10						
61	June 7	Giants	2–1	Mussina (9–2)	Hernandez (5–6)	Rivera (18)	Yankee Stadium	55,053	39–22
62	June 8	Giants	3–4	Schmidt (2–1)	Rivera (1–3)	Nen (16)	Yankee Stadium	55,194	39–23
63	June 9	Giants	4–2	Clemens (8–2)	Rodriguez (1–3)	Karsay (2)	Yankee Stadium	55,335	40–23
64	June 10	Diamondbacks	7–5	Stanton (3–0)	Johnson (9–2)	—	Yankee Stadium	45,698	41–23
65	June 11	Diamondbacks	6–4	Wells (7–3)	Anderson (1–6)	Mendoza (1)	Yankee Stadium	44,734	42–23
66	June 12	Diamondbacks	5–9	Batista (4–3)	Mussina (9–3)	Kim (17)	Yankee Stadium	50,864	42–24
67	June 14	@ Mets	4–2 (10)	Karsay (3–2)	Komiyama (0–3)	—	Shea Stadium	54,069	43–24
68	June 15	@ Mets	0–8	Estes (3–5)	Clemens (8–3)	—	Shea Stadium	54,347	43–25
69	June 16	@ Mets	2–3	Guthrie (1–0)	Wells (7–4)	Benitez (15)	Shea Stadium	55,141	43–26
70	June 18	@ Rockies	10–5	Mussina (10–3)	Jennings (8–3)	Stanton (1)	Coors Field	48,738	44–26
71	June 19	@ Rockies	20–10	Mendoza (4–2)	White (1–5)	—	Coors Field	48,821	45–26
72	June 20	@ Rockies	11–14 (10)	Stark (4–1)	Karsay (3–3)	—	Coors Field	48,916	45–27
73	June 21	@ Padres	1–9	Perez (2–0)	Wells (7–5)	—	Qualcomm Stadium	55,858	45–28
74	June 22	@ Padres	1–0	Lilly (3–5)	Peavy (0–1)	—	Qualcomm Stadium	60,021	46–28
75	June 23	@ Padres	3–2	Mendoza (5–2)	Reed (1–3)	Karsay (3)	Qualcomm Stadium	50,050	47–28
76	June 25	@ Orioles	3–4	Roberts (4–2)	Pettitte (1–2)	Julio (16)	Oriole Park at Camden Yards	41,583	47–29
77	June 26	@ Orioles	7–8	Roberts (5–2)	Stanton (3–1)	—	Oriole Park at Camden Yards	42,670	47–30
78	June 27	@ Orioles	3–2	Wells (8–5)	Erickson (3–7)	Rivera (19)	Oriole Park at Camden Yards	48,057	48–30
79	June 28	Mets	11–5	Mussina (11–3)	D'Amico (4–7)	O. Hernandez (1)	Yankee Stadium	55,739	49–30
80	June 29	Mets	2–11	Leiter (8–6)	Lilly (3–6)	—	Yankee Stadium	55,615	49–31
81	June 30	Mets	8–0	Pettitte (2–2)	Trachsel (6–7)	—	Yankee Stadium	55,700	50–31

July (17–8) Home: 9–2 Away: 8–6

#	Date	Opponent	Score	Win	Loss	Save	Location	Attendance	Record
82	July 2	Indians	10–5	Mendoza (6–2)	Rincon (0–3)	—	Yankee Stadium	45,589	51–31
83	July 3	Indians	11–8	Wells (9–5)	Sabathia (6–7)	Rivera (20)	Yankee Stadium	39,879	52–31
84	July 4	Indians	7–1	Mussina (12–3)	Finley (4–11)	—	Yankee Stadium	42,909	53–31
85	July 5	Blue Jays	6–3	O. Hernandez (5–2)	Loaiza (3–5)	Rivera (21)	Yankee Stadium	46,788	54–31
86	July 6	Blue Jays	3–8	Parris (1–2)	Pettitte (2–3)	—	Yankee Stadium	55,005	54–32
87	July 7	Blue Jays	10–6	Weaver (7–8)	Thurman (1–2)	—	Yankee Stadium	46,922	55–32
73rd All-Star Game in Milwaukee, Wisconsin
88	July 11	@ Indians	7–4	Pettitte (3–3)	Sabathia (6–8)	Rivera (22)	Jacobs Field	41,192	56–32
89	July 12	@ Indians	1–2 (10)	Wohlers (1–1)	Karsay (3–4)	—	Jacobs Field	42,518	56–33
90	July 13	@ Indians	14–5	Wells (10–5)	Drese (8–7)	—	Jacobs Field	42,631	57–33
91	July 14	@ Indians	7–10	Rincon (1–3)	Rivera (1–4)	—	Jacobs Field	42,573	57–34
92	July 15	@ Blue Jays	5–8	Parris (2–2)	O. Hernandez (5–3)	Escobar (15)	SkyDome	25,371	57–35
93	July 16	@ Blue Jays	7–6	Karsay (4–4)	Politte (3–3)	Rivera (23)	SkyDome	27,197	58–35
94	July 17	Tigers	2–1	Pettitte (4–3)	Redman (5–9)	—	Yankee Stadium	49,116	59–35
95	July 18	Tigers	6–5	Mendoza (7–2)	Rodney (1–3)	Rivera (24)	Yankee Stadium	54,725	60–35
96	July 19	Red Sox	2–4	Martinez (12–2)	Mussina (12–4)	Urbina (24)	Yankee Stadium	55,510	60–36
97	July 20	Red Sox	9–8 (11)	Karsay (5–4)	Gomes (1–2)	—	Yankee Stadium	55,526	61–36
98	July 21	Red Sox	9–8	Stanton (4–1)	Urbina (1–5)	—	Yankee Stadium	55,581	62–36
99	July 23	@ Indians	3–9	Baez (8–7)	Pettitte (4–4)	—	Jacobs Field	38,520	62–37
100	July 24	@ Indians	14–7	Wells (11–5)	Drese (8–8)	—	Jacobs Field	38,081	63–37
101	July 26	@ Devil Rays	12–9	Mussina (13–4)	Sosa (1–3)	Karsay (4)	Tropicana Field	22,527	64–37
102	July 27	@ Devil Rays	4–7	Harper (4–6)	Weaver (7–9)	Yan (14)	Tropicana Field	35,021	64–38
103	July 28	@ Devil Rays	9–1	Pettitte (5–4)	Sturtze (1–11)	—	Tropicana Field	29,144	65–38
104	July 29	@ Rangers	9–2	O. Hernandez (6–3)	Rogers (11–6)	—	The Ballpark in Arlington	44,006	66–38
105	July 30	@ Rangers	9–6	Wells (12–5)	Myette (0–3)	Mendoza (2)	The Ballpark in Arlington	42,818	67–38
106	July 31	@ Rangers	6–17	Bell (4–3)	Mussina (13–5)	—	The Ballpark in Arlington	41,133	67–39

August (17–11) Home: 7–6 Away: 10–5

#	Date	Opponent	Score	Win	Loss	Save	Location	Attendance	Record
107	August 1	@ Angels	1–2	Washburn (13–3)	Weaver (7–10)	Percival (25)	Edison International Field of Anaheim	42,897	67–40
108	August 2	@ Angels	4–0	Pettitte (6–4)	Appier (9–9)	Mendoza (3)	Edison International Field of Anaheim	43,668	68–40
109	August 3	@ Angels	4–5	Percival (4–1)	Mendoza (7–3)	—	Edison International Field of Anaheim	43,619	68–41
110	August 4	@ Angels	7–5 (12)	Stanton (5–1)	Shields (3–2)	Mendoza (4)	Edison International Field of Anaheim	43,455	69–41
111	August 6	Royals	2–6	Ru. Hernandez (2–1)	Mussina (13–6)	—	Yankee Stadium	48,275	69–42
112	August 7	Royals	6–2	Clemens (9–3)	Suppan (8–11)	—	Yankee Stadium	40,184	70–42
113	August 8	Royals	6–3	Pettitte (7–4)	Byrd (14–8)	Rivera (25)	Yankee Stadium	55,142	71–42
114	August 9	Athletics	2–3 (16)	Bowie (2–0)	Hitchcock (1–1)	—	Yankee Stadium	54,316	71–43
115	August 10	Athletics	0–8	Lidle (5–9)	Wells (12–6)	—	Yankee Stadium	54,439	71–44
116	August 11	Athletics	8–5	Mussina (14–6)	Mulder (13–7)	—	Yankee Stadium	54,703	72–44
117	August 13	@ Royals	10–5	Clemens (10–3)	Suppan (8–12)	—	Kauffman Stadium	28,834	73–44
118	August 14	@ Royals	3–2	Mendoza (8–3)	Stein (0–3)	Rivera (26)	Kauffman Stadium	26,383	74–44
119	August 15	@ Royals	7–5 (12)	Stanton (6–1)	Ro. Hernandez (1–3)	Rivera (27)	Kauffman Stadium	27,565	75–44
120	August 16	@ Mariners	9–3	Wells (13–6)	Halama (5–4)	Weaver (1)	Safeco Field	46,033	76–44
121	August 17	@ Mariners	8–3	Mussina (15–6)	Franklin (4–3)	Karsay (5)	Safeco Field	46,174	77–44
122	August 18	@ Mariners	2–5	Pineiro (13–4)	Clemens (10–4)	Sasaki (31)	Safeco Field	46,086	77–45
123	August 20	Angels	7–5	Pettitte (8–4)	Sele (8–9)	Stanton (2)	Yankee Stadium	41,619	78–45
124	August 21	Angels	1–5 (11)	Weber (5–2)	Weaver (7–11)	—	Yankee Stadium	46,423	78–46
125	August 22	Angels	4–2	Wells (14–6)	Lackey (5–3)	Karsay (6)	Yankee Stadium	43,222	79–46
126	August 23	Rangers	2–6	Park (5–6)	Mussina (15–7)	—	Yankee Stadium	50,871	79–47
127	August 24	Rangers	3–2	Clemens (11–4)	Alvarez (0–4)	Karsay (7)	Yankee Stadium	53,494	80–47
128	August 25	Rangers	2–6	Benoit (3–2)	Pettitte (8–5)	—	Yankee Stadium	50,037	80–48
129	August 26	Rangers	10–3	O. Hernandez (7–3)	Rogers (12–7)	Weaver (2)	Yankee Stadium	42,785	81–48
130	August 27	@ Red Sox	6–0	Wells (15–6)	Fossum (2–3)	—	Fenway Park	33,810	82–48
131	August 28	@ Red Sox	7–0	Mussina (16–7)	Martinez (17–4)	—	Fenway Park	33,793	83–48
132	August 29	@ Blue Jays	4–7	Loaiza (7–7)	Clemens (11–5)	—	SkyDome	32,679	83–49
133	August 30	@ Blue Jays	9–7	Weaver (8–11)	Walker (7–4)	Karsay (8)	SkyDome	24,301	84–49
134	August 31	@ Blue Jays	1–5	Miller (6–4)	O. Hernandez (7–4)	—	SkyDome	36,021	84–50

September (19–8) Home: 12–5 Away: 7–3

#	Date	Opponent	Score	Win	Loss	Save	Location	Attendance	Record
135	September 1	@ Blue Jays	6–7	Halladay (15–6)	Wells (15–7)	Escobar (28)	SkyDome	32,577	84–51
136	September 2	Red Sox	4–8	Fossum (3–3)	Mussina (16–8)	—	Yankee Stadium	55,169	84–52
137	September 3	Red Sox	4–2	Clemens (12–5)	Castillo (5–13)	Stanton (3)	Yankee Stadium	47,318	85–52
138	September 4	Red Sox	3–1	Pettitte (9–5)	Lowe (18–7)	Karsay (9)	Yankee Stadium	50,006	86–52
139	September 5	Tigers	9–3	O. Hernandez (8–4)	Sparks (8–15)	—	Yankee Stadium	28,222	87–52
140	September 6	Tigers	8–1	Wells (16–7)	Redman (8–14)	—	Yankee Stadium	41,114	88–52
141	September 7	Tigers	1–2	German (1–0)	Mussina (16–9)	Acevedo (28)	Yankee Stadium	40,541	88–53
142	September 8	Tigers	6–4	Stanton (7–1)	Henriquez (1–1)	Karsay (10)	Yankee Stadium	39,302	89–53
143	September 10 (1)	Orioles	5–2	Pettitte (10–5)	Johnson (4–13)	Stanton (4)	Yankee Stadium	8,875	90–53
144	September 10 (2)	Orioles	3–1	Weaver (9–11)	Ponson (7–6)	Karsay (11)	Yankee Stadium	31,270	91–53
145	September 11	Orioles	5–4 (11)	Karsay (6–4)	Bauer (6–7)	—	Yankee Stadium	35,183	92–53
146	September 12	Orioles	7–3	Wells (17–7)	Douglass (0–3)	—	Yankee Stadium	33,263	93–53
147	September 13	White Sox	2–13	Biddle (2–3)	Mussina (16–10)	Osuna (11)	Yankee Stadium	45,935	93–54
148	September 14	White Sox	1–8	Wright (12–12)	Clemens (12–6)	—	Yankee Stadium	44,795	93–55
149	September 15	White Sox	8–4 (6)	Pettitte (11–5)	Porzio (2–1)	—	Yankee Stadium	39,587	94–55
150	September 17	@ Devil Rays	7–9	Carter (1–0)	Mendoza (8–4)	—	Tropicana Field	14,797	94–56
151	September 18	@ Devil Rays	7–1	Weaver (10–11)	Zambrano (6–8)	—	Tropicana Field	14,993	94–57
152	September 19	@ Devil Rays	2–3 (10)	Yan (7–8)	Hitchcock (1–2)	—	Tropicana Field	18,557	95–57
153	September 20	@ Tigers	5–1	Clemens (13–6)	Van Hekken (1–2)	—	Comerica Park	25,364	96–57
154	September 21	@ Tigers	3–2	Pettitte (12–5)	Beverlin (0–2)	Karsay (12)	Comerica Park	25,432	97–57
155	September 22	@ Tigers	4–3	Wells (18–7)	Maroth (6–9)	Stanton (5)	Comerica Park	23,930	98–57
156	September 23	Devil Rays	2–3	Zambrano (7–8)	O. Hernandez (8–5)	Yan (19)	Yankee Stadium	31,937	98–58
157	September 24	Devil Rays	6–0	Mussina (17–10)	Harper (5–9)	—	Yankee Stadium	32,492	99–58
158	September 25	Devil Rays	4–3	Weaver (11–11)	Sturtze (4–18)	Rivera (28)	Yankee Stadium	30,004	100–58
–	September 26	Devil Rays	Cancelled (rain)						
159	September 27	@ Orioles	6–2	Pettitte (13–5)	Ponson (7–9)	—	Oriole Park at Camden Yards	40,975	101–58
160	September 28	@ Orioles	4–2	Wells (19–7)	Driskill (8–8)	Stanton (6)	Oriole Park at Camden Yards	48,165	102–58
161	September 29	@ Orioles	6–1	Mussina (18–10)	Stephens (2–5)	—	Oriole Park at Camden Yards	46,443	103–58

== Player stats ==
=== Starters by position ===
Note: Pos = Position; G = Games played; AB = At bats; H = Hits; Avg. = Batting average; HR = Home runs; RBI = Runs batted in

Pos	Player	G	AB	H	Avg.	HR	RBI
C	Jorge Posada	143	511	137	.268	20	99
1B	Jason Giambi	155	560	176	.314	41	122
2B	Alfonso Soriano	156	696	209	.300	39	102
SS	Derek Jeter	157	644	191	.297	18	75
3B	Robin Ventura	141	465	115	.247	27	93
LF	Rondell White	126	455	109	.240	14	62
CF	Bernie Williams	154	612	204	.333	19	102
RF	Raúl Mondesí	71	270	65	.241	11	43
DH	Nick Johnson	129	378	92	.243	15	58

=== Other batters ===
Note: G = Games played; AB = At bats; H = Hits; Avg. = Batting average; HR = Home runs; RBI = Runs batted in

Player	G	AB	H	Avg.	HR	RBI
Shane Spencer	94	288	71	.247	6	34
John Vander Wal	84	219	57	.260	6	20
Ron Coomer	55	148	39	.264	3	17
Enrique Wilson	60	105	19	.181	2	11
Juan Rivera	28	83	22	.265	1	6
Chris Widger	21	64	19	.297	0	5
Alberto Castillo	15	37	5	.135	0	4
Gerald Williams	33	17	0	.000	0	0
Marcus Thames	7	13	3	.231	1	2
Alex Arias	6	7	0	.000	0	0
Karim García	2	5	1	.200	0	0
Drew Henson	3	1	0	.000	0	0

=== Starting pitchers ===
Note: G = Games, IP = Innings pitched; W = Wins; L = Losses; ERA = Earned run average; SO = Strikeouts

Player	G	IP	W	L	ERA	SO
Mike Mussina	33	215.2	18	10	4.05	182
David Wells	31	206.1	19	7	3.75	137
Roger Clemens	29	180.0	13	6	4.35	192
Orlando Hernández	24	146.0	8	5	3.64	113
Andy Pettitte	22	134.2	13	5	3.27	97
Ted Lilly	16	76.2	3	6	3.40	59

=== Other pitchers ===
Note: G = Games; IP = Innings pitched; W = Wins; L = Losses; ERA = Earned run average; SO = Strikeouts

Player	G	IP	W	L	ERA	SO
Jeff Weaver	15	78.0	5	3	4.04	57
Mike Thurman	12	33.0	1	0	5.18	23
Adrián Hernández	2	6.0	0	1	12.00	9

=== Relief pitchers ===
Note: G = Games; W = Wins; L = Losses; SV = Saves; ERA = Earned run average; SO = Strikeouts

Player	G	W	L	SV	ERA	SO
Mariano Rivera	45	1	4	28	2.74	41
Ramiro Mendoza	62	8	4	4	3.44	61
Mike Stanton	79	7	1	6	3.00	44
Steve Karsay	78	6	4	12	3.26	65
Sterling Hitchcock	20	1	2	0	5.49	31
Randy Choate	18	0	0	0	6.04	17
Brandon Knight	7	0	0	0	11.42	7
Jay Tessmer	2	0	0	0	6.75	0

== Postseason ==
=== Game log ===
2002 Postseason Game Log (1–3)
ALDS vs Angels (1–3)

#	Date	Opponent	Score	Win	Loss	Save	Location	Attendance	Record
1	October 1	Angels	8–5	Karsay (1–0)	Weber (0–1)	Rivera (1)	Yankee Stadium	56,710	1–0
2	October 2	Angels	6–8	Rodriguez (1–0)	Hernandez (0–1)	Percival (1)	Yankee Stadium	56,695	1–1
3	October 4	@ Angels	6–9	Rodriguez (2–0)	Stanton (0–1)	Percival (2)	Edison International Field of Anaheim	45,072	1–2
4	October 5	@ Angels	5–9	Washburn (1–0)	Wells (0–1)	—	Edison International Field of Anaheim	45,067	1–3

=== ALDS ===
Anaheim's victory secured their place in the American League Championship Series, where they defeated the Minnesota Twins, and subsequently the San Francisco Giants to win the World Series.

This was the first time since 1997 that the Yankees failed to win the American League pennant and advance to the World Series.

== Awards and records ==
- Jason Giambi, Silver Slugger Award
- Alfonso Soriano, Most home runs in one season by an American League second baseman (39)

== Farm system ==
Level	Team	League	Manager
AAA	Columbus Clippers	International League	Brian Butterfield, Frank Howard and Stump Merrill
AA	Norwich Navigators	Eastern League	Stump Merrill and Luis Sojo
A	Tampa Yankees	Florida State League	Mitch Seoane
A	Greensboro Bats	South Atlantic League	Bill Masse
A-Short Season	Staten Island Yankees	New York–Penn League	Derek Shelton
Rookie	GCL Yankees	Gulf Coast League	Manny Crespo

LEAGUE CHAMPIONS: Norwich, Staten Island
