= 2002 Kansas City Royals season =

2002 Kansas City Royals
- League: American League
- Division: Central
- Ballpark: Kauffman Stadium
- City: Kansas City, Missouri
- Record: 62-100 (.383)
- Divisional place: 4th
- Owners: David Glass
- General managers: Allard Baird
- Managers: Tony Muser, John Mizerock, Tony Peña
- Television: KMBC-TV; KCWE; FSN Rocky Mountain (Paul Splittorff, Bob Davis)
- Radio: KMBZ (Denny Matthews, Ryan Lefebvre)

The 2002 Kansas City Royals season was the 34th season for the franchise, and their 30th at Kauffman Stadium. The Royals failed to improve on their 65–97 record from 2001, and finished fourth in the American League Central, with a record of 62 wins and 100 losses, their first 100 loss season in franchise history. The Royals missed the postseason for the 17th consecutive season.

== Offseason ==
- December 18, 2001: Chuck Knoblauch was signed as a free agent with the Kansas City Royals.
- December 19, 2001: Traded a PTBNL to the Chicago Cubs for Michael Tucker. The Royals sent Shawn Sonnier to Chicago on March 15, 2002, to complete the trade.
- January 10, 2002: Paul Byrd was signed as a free agent with the Kansas City Royals.
- March 28, 2002: Donzell McDonald was assigned to the Kansas City Royals by the Cleveland Indians.

== Regular season ==
=== Season standings ===
AL Central
Team	W	L	Pct.	GB	Home	Road
Minnesota Twins	94	67	.584	—	54‍–‍27	40‍–‍40
Chicago White Sox	81	81	.500	13½	47‍–‍34	34‍–‍47
Cleveland Indians	74	88	.457	20½	39‍–‍42	35‍–‍46
Kansas City Royals	62	100	.383	32½	37‍–‍44	25‍–‍56
Detroit Tigers	55	106	.342	39	33‍–‍47	22‍–‍59

=== American League Wild Card ===
Division leaders
Team	W	L	Pct.
New York Yankees	103	58	.640
Minnesota Twins	94	67	.584
Oakland Athletics	103	59	.636

Wild Card team (Top team qualifies for postseason)
Team	W	L	Pct.	GB
Anaheim Angels	99	63	.611	—
Boston Red Sox	93	69	.574	6
Seattle Mariners	93	69	.574	6
Chicago White Sox	81	81	.500	18
Toronto Blue Jays	78	84	.481	21
Cleveland Indians	74	88	.457	25
Texas Rangers	72	90	.444	27
Baltimore Orioles	67	95	.414	32
Kansas City Royals	62	100	.383	37
Detroit Tigers	55	106	.342	43½
Tampa Bay Devil Rays	55	106	.342	43½

=== Record vs. opponents ===
2002 American League record Source: MLB Standings Grid – 2002
Team	ANA	BAL	BOS	CWS	CLE	DET	KC	MIN	NYY	OAK	SEA	TB	TEX	TOR	NL
Anaheim	—	7–2	3–4	6–3	6–3	8–1	6–3	4–5	3–4	9–11	9–10	8–1	12–7	7–2	11–7
Baltimore	2–7	—	6–13	3–4	1–5	2–4	7–0	5–1	6–13	4–5	5–4	10–9	3–6	4–15	9–9
Boston	4–3	13–6	—	2–4	5–4	5–4	4–2	3–3	9–10	6–3	4–5	16–3	4–3	13–6	5–13
Chicago	3–6	4–3	4–2	—	9–10	12–7	11–8	8–11	2–4	2–7	5–4	4–3	5–4	4–2	8–10
Cleveland	3–6	5–1	4–5	10–9	—	10–9	9–10	8–11	3–6	2–5	3–4	4–2	4–5	3–3	6–12
Detroit	1–8	4–2	4–5	7–12	9–10	—	9–10	4–14	1–8	1–6	2–5	2–4	5–4	0–6	6–12
Kansas City	3–6	0–7	2–4	8–11	10–9	10–9	—	5–14	1–5	1–8	3–6	4–2	7–2	3–4	5–13
Minnesota	5–4	1–5	3–3	11–8	11–8	14–4	14–5	—	0–6	3–6	5–4	5–2	6–3	6–1	10–8
New York	4–3	13–6	10–9	4–2	6–3	8–1	5–1	6–0	—	5–4	4–5	13–5	4–3	10–9	11–7
Oakland	11–9	5–4	3–6	7–2	5–2	6–1	8–1	6–3	4–5	—	8–11	8–1	13–6	3–6	16–2
Seattle	10–9	4–5	5–4	4–5	4–3	5–2	6–3	4–5	5–4	11–8	—	5–4	13–7	6–3	11–7
Tampa Bay	1–8	9–10	3–16	3–4	2–4	4–2	2–4	2–5	5–13	1–8	4–5	—	4–5	8–11	7–11
Texas	7–12	6–3	3–4	4–5	5–4	4–5	2–7	3–6	3–4	6–13	7–13	5–4	—	8–1	9–9
Toronto	2–7	15–4	6–13	2–4	3–3	6–0	4–3	1–6	9–10	6–3	3–6	11–8	1–8	—	9–9

=== Notable transactions ===
- June 4, 2002: Zack Greinke was drafted by the Kansas City Royals in the 1st round (6th pick) of the 2002 amateur draft. Player signed July 13, 2002.

=== Roster ===
2002 Kansas City Royals
Roster
Pitchers: 48 Jeremy Affeldt; 53 Miguel Asencio; 26 Jeff Austin; 58 Cory Bailey; 35 Ryan Bukvich; 36 Paul Byrd; 33 Chad Durbin; 56 Nate Field; 32 Chris George; 38 Jason Grimsley; 39 Roberto Hernández; 40 Runelvys Hernández; 52 Jeremy Hill; 54 Mike MacDougal; 31 Darrell May; 57 Scott Mullen; 43 Wes Obermueller; 41 Dan Reichert; 47 Bryan Rekar; 56 Shawn Sedlacek; 52 Brian Shouse; 34 Blake Stein; 37 Jeff Suppan; 17 Mac Suzuki; 46 Brad Voyles; 51 Kris Wilson	Catchers: 22 Juan Brito; 7 A. J. Hinch; 2 Brent Mayne; 17 Dusty Wathan; Infielders: 12 Luis Alicea; 4 Ángel Berroa; 50 Mike Caruso; 3 Carlos Febles; 6 David McCarty; 1 Luis Ordaz; 19 Kit Pellow; 8 Neifi Pérez; 43 Chan Perry; 16 Joe Randa; 29 Mike Sweeney	Outfielders: 15 Carlos Beltrán; 30 Brandon Berger; 27 Dee Brown; 9 Alexis Gómez; 45 Aaron Guiel; 18 Raúl Ibañez; 11 Chuck Knoblauch; 19 Donzell McDonald; 14 Mark Quinn; 1 Donnie Sadler; 24 Michael Tucker	Manager: 13 John Mizerock; 40 Tony Muser; 6 Tony Peña; Coaches: 25 Rich Dauer (third base); 21 Tom Gamboa (first base); 23 Lamar Johnson (hitting); 13 John Mizerock (bullpen); 35 Al Nipper (pitching); 44 Bob Schaefer (bench)

== Player stats ==
=== Batting ===
==== Starters by position ====
Note: Pos = Position; G = Games played; AB = At bats; H = Hits; Avg. = Batting average; HR = Home runs; RBI = Runs batted in

Pos	Player	G	AB	H	Avg.	HR	RBI
C	Brent Mayne	101	326	77	.236	4	30
1B	Mike Sweeney	126	471	160	.340	24	86
2B	Carlos Febles	119	351	86	.245	4	26
SS	Neifi Pérez	145	554	131	.236	3	37
3B	Joe Randa	151	549	155	.282	11	80
LF	Chuck Knoblauch	80	300	63	.210	6	22
CF	Carlos Beltrán	162	637	174	.273	29	105
RF	Michael Tucker	144	475	118	.248	12	56
DH	Raúl Ibañez	137	497	146	.294	24	103

==== Other batters ====
Note: G = Games played; AB = At bats; H = Hits; Avg. = Batting average; HR = Home runs; RBI = Runs batted in

Player	G	AB	H	Avg.	HR	RBI
Aaron Guiel	70	240	56	.233	4	38
Luis Alicea	94	237	54	.228	1	23
A. J. Hinch	72	197	49	.249	7	27
Brandon Berger	51	134	27	.201	6	17
Luis Ordaz	33	94	21	.223	0	4
Mark Quinn	23	76	18	.237	2	11
Ángel Berroa	20	75	17	.227	0	5
Donnie Sadler	35	68	13	.191	0	5
Kit Pellow	29	63	15	.238	1	5
Dee Brown	16	51	12	.235	1	7
David McCarty	13	32	3	.094	1	2
Juan Brito	9	23	7	.304	0	1
Donzell McDonald	10	22	4	.182	0	1
Mike Caruso	12	20	2	.100	0	0
Chan Perry	5	11	1	.091	0	3
Alexis Gómez	5	10	2	.200	0	0
Dusty Wathan	3	5	3	.600	0	1

=== Pitching ===
==== Starting pitchers ====
Note: G = Games pitched; IP = Innings pitched; W = Wins; L = Losses; ERA = Earned run average; SO = Strikeouts

Player	G	IP	W	L	ERA	SO
Paul Byrd	33	228.1	17	11	3.90	129
Jeff Suppan	33	208.0	9	16	5.32	109
Shawn Sedlacek	16	84.1	3	5	6.72	52
Runelvys Hernández	12	74.1	4	4	4.36	45
Chris George	6	27.1	0	4	5.60	13
Chad Durbin	2	8.1	0	1	11.88	5
Wes Obermueller	2	7.2	0	2	11.74	5
Bryan Rekar	2	7.0	0	2	15.43	2

==== Other pitchers ====
Note: G = Games pitched; IP = Innings pitched; W = Wins; L = Losses; ERA = Earned run average; SO = Strikeouts

Player	G	IP	W	L	ERA	SO
Darrell May	30	131.1	4	10	5.35	95
Miguel Asencio	31	123.1	4	7	5.11	58
Jeremy Affeldt	34	77.2	3	4	4.64	67
Dan Reichert	30	66.0	3	5	5.32	36
Mac Suzuki	7	21.0	0	2	9.00	15

==== Relief pitchers ====
Note: G = Games pitched; W = Wins; L = Losses; SV = Saves; ERA = Earned run average; SO = Strikeouts

Player	G	W	L	SV	ERA	SO
Roberto Hernández	53	1	3	26	4.33	39
Jason Grimsley	70	4	7	1	3.91	59
Scott Mullen	44	4	5	0	3.15	21
Cory Bailey	37	3	4	1	4.11	24
Blake Stein	27	0	4	1	7.91	42
Ryan Bukvich	26	1	0	0	6.12	20
Brian Shouse	23	0	0	0	6.14	11
Brad Voyles	22	0	2	1	6.51	26
Kris Wilson	12	2	0	0	8.20	10
Jeff Austin	10	0	0	0	4.91	6
Jeremy Hill	10	0	1	0	3.86	7
Mike MacDougal	6	0	1	0	5.00	10
Nate Field	5	0	0	0	9.00	3

== Farm system ==
Level	Team	League	Manager
AAA	Omaha Royals	Pacific Coast League	Bucky Dent
AA	Wichita Wranglers	Texas League	Keith Bodie
A	Wilmington Blue Rocks	Carolina League	Jeff Garber
A	Burlington Bees	Midwest League	Joe Szekely
A-Short Season	Spokane Indians	Northwest League	Tom Poquette
Rookie	GCL Royals	Gulf Coast League	Lloyd Simmons
