= Dave Maurer (baseball) =

American baseball player (born 1975)

- Pitcher
- Born: February 23, 1975 (age 50); Minneapolis, Minnesota
- Batted: Right Threw: Left

MLB debut
- July 22, 2000, for the San Diego Padres

Last MLB appearance
- August 28, 2004, for the Toronto Blue Jays

MLB statistics
- Win–loss record: 1–1
- Earned run average: 8.87
- Strikeouts: 18
- Stats at Baseball Reference

Teams
- San Diego Padres (2000–2001); Cleveland Indians (2002); Toronto Blue Jays (2004)

David Charles Maurer (born February 23, 1975) is an American former Major League Baseball player. A pitcher, Maurer played for the San Diego Padres (2000 and 2001), Cleveland Indians (2002), and Toronto Blue Jays (2004).

Maurer attended Apple Valley High School in Apple Valley, Minnesota. He played college baseball at Howard College and Oklahoma State University. In 1996, he played collegiate summer baseball with the Orleans Cardinals of the Cape Cod Baseball League. He was selected by the Padres in the 11th round of the 1997 MLB draft.
