= Carl Sadler =

American baseball player (born 1976)

- Relief pitcher
- Born: October 11, 1976 (age 49); Gainesville, Florida
- Batted: Left Threw: Left

MLB debut
- July 31, 2002, for the Cleveland Indians

Last MLB appearance
- May 18, 2003, for the Cleveland Indians

MLB statistics
- Win–loss record: 1–2
- Earned run average: 3.60
- Strikeouts: 33
- Stats at Baseball Reference

Teams
- Cleveland Indians (2002–2003)

William Carl Sadler (born October 11, 1976) is an American former Major League Baseball player. A pitcher, Sadler played for the Cleveland Indians in 2002 and 2003.

Sadler attended high school in Perry, Florida, and was selected by the Montreal Expos in the 34th round of the 1996 Major League Baseball draft. He signed with the team, and spent the 1997 season with the Expos' rookie team as well as the Vermont Expos. He missed the 1998 season due to elbow surgery, and was released by the Expos. The Cleveland Indians signed him in 1996, but he underwent Tommy John surgery after six games, missing the rest of 1999 and some of 2000, with doctors giving Sadler a 50-50 chance of pitching again after surgery. In 2001, Sadler spent most of the season with the Kinston Indians, finishing with a win-loss record of 6-0, a 1.88 earned run average (ERA), and 78 strikeouts in 27 appearances. He spent 2002 with the Akron Aeros and Buffalo Bisons, and had ERAs of 2.33 and 1.93 in 33 combined games, which led to his major league debut.

Sadler made his major league debut on July 31, 2002, and played in 24 games, going 1-2 with a 4.43 ERA. The following year, he made the roster to start the season, and over the first two months of the season had a 1.88 ERA. However, opposing left-handed hitters had a .333 batting average against him, and he was demoted in spite of the low ERA. He finished the season with Buffalo, and had a 6.28 ERA in 31 appearances. The following season, Sadler split the season with Akron and Buffalo, and he was released at the end of the season. In 2005, he played for the Long Island Ducks and Somerset Patriots of the independent Atlantic League and the Yuma Scorpions of the Golden Baseball League, retiring after the season ended.
