= Juan Díaz (first baseman) =

Cuban baseball player (born 1974)

- First baseman
- Born: February 19, 1974 (age 52); San José de las Lajas, Cuba
- Batted: Right Threw: Right

MLB debut
- June 12, 2002, for the Boston Red Sox

Last MLB appearance
- June 23, 2002, for the Boston Red Sox

MLB statistics
- Batting average: .286
- Home runs: 1
- Runs batted in: 2
- Stats at Baseball Reference

Teams
- Boston Red Sox (2002)

Juan Carlos Díaz (born February 19, 1974) is a Cuban former professional baseball player. Listed at 6 feet 2 inches (1.88 m) and 228 pounds (103 kg), he batted and threw right-handed. He spent part of the 2002 season in Major League Baseball (MLB) with the Boston Red Sox as a first baseman and designated hitter.

== Biography ==
Díaz was a veteran of 14 minor-league seasons. He started his baseball career in 1997 with the Los Angeles Dodgers organization, playing for them two years before joining the Boston (2000–2002), Baltimore (2003), Minnesota (2004), and St. Louis systems. In 2007, he played for the independent Joliet JackHammers of the Northern League. He split 2008 between the JackHammers and the Tecolotes de Nuevo Laredo of the Mexican League.

In four major-league games with the Red Sox, Díaz posted a .286 batting average (2-for-7) with two RBIs and two runs scored. He also had one walk, for a .375 on-base percentage. His two hits consisted of a home run and a double, yielding an .857 slugging average. His only home run came on June 23, when he hit a two-run shot off Dodgers pitcher Andy Ashby in a 9–6 loss, in what turned out to be the final at-bat of Diaz's major-league career.

From 1997 through 2008, Díaz made 936 minor league appearances, hitting for a .301 average (999-for-3209) with 230 home runs and 719 RBIs.

Diaz played the 2010 baseball season for the Winnipeg Goldeyes in the Northern League. On January 27, 2011, it was announced that he was released by Winnipeg. Two months later, Díaz retired from baseball.

== See also ==
- List of baseball players who defected from Cuba
- List of Major League Baseball players with a home run in their final major league at bat
