= Dave Elder (baseball) =

American baseball player (1975–2023)

- Pitcher
- Born: September 23, 1975; Atlanta, Georgia, U.S.
- Died: January 31, 2023 (aged 47); McDonough, Georgia, U.S.
- Batted: Right Threw: Right

MLB debut
- July 24, 2002, for the Cleveland Indians

Last MLB appearance
- May 11, 2003, for the Cleveland Indians

MLB statistics
- Win–loss record: 1–3
- Earned run average: 4.62
- Strikeouts: 26
- Stats at Baseball Reference

Teams
- Cleveland Indians (2002–2003)

David Matthew Elder (September 23, 1975 – January 31, 2023) was an American Major League Baseball player. A pitcher, Elder played for the Cleveland Indians in 2002 and 2003.

Elder attended Booker T. Washington High School in Pensacola, Florida, and played college baseball for Georgia Tech. In 1996, he played collegiate summer baseball with the Hyannis Mets of the Cape Cod Baseball League. He was selected by the Texas Rangers in the fourth round of the 1997 MLB draft. Elder began his career with the rookie-level Pulaski Rangers, and had a 1.95 earned run average (ERA) in 20 games. He missed the 1998 season due to Tommy John surgery. Afterwards, he would play in 24 games for the Charlotte Rangers, finishing with a 4–2 win–loss record and a 2.84 ERA. He spent 2000 with the Tulsa Drillers, but struggled due to a high walk rate of 6.8 bases on balls per nine innings.

After spending 2001 with the Drillers and the Oklahoma RedHawks, Elder was traded to the Cleveland Indians on December 18 for John Rocker. He split 2002 with the Akron Aeros and Buffalo Bisons, then made his major league debut on July 24, 2002. He pitched in 15 games on the season and had a 0–2 record and a 3.13 ERA. On May 11, 2003, Elder surrendered Rafael Palmeiro's 500th career home run at The Ballpark in Arlington. This ended up being Elder's final major league game, as he was demoted to the minors shortly afterward.

Elder spent the rest of 2003 with the Bisons, then became a free agent after the 2003 season and signed with the Atlanta Braves. He spent 2004 with the Greenville Braves, the Trenton Thunder of the New York Yankees organization, and the Somerset Patriots of the Atlantic League. In 2005 and 2006, Elder split the season between Somerset and the Omaha Royals, the Kansas City Royals' Triple-A team. In 2007, he started two games for Somerset before finishing the season with the Vaqueros Laguna in the Mexican League, finishing the season with a 4–1 record and a 2.75 ERA in 26 games; he retired after the season.

Elder died in McDonough, Georgia, on January 31, 2023, at the age of 47. He had committed suicide via drug overdose.
