= Bruce Aven =

American baseball player (born 1972)

- Outfielder
- Born: March 4, 1972 (age 54); Orange, Texas, U.S.
- Batted: Right Threw: Right

MLB debut
- August 27, 1997, for the Cleveland Indians

Last MLB appearance
- May 27, 2002, for the Cleveland Indians

MLB statistics
- Batting average: .273
- Home runs: 20
- Runs batted in: 103
- Stats at Baseball Reference

Teams
- Cleveland Indians (1997); Florida Marlins (1999); Pittsburgh Pirates (2000); Los Angeles Dodgers (2000–2001); Cleveland Indians (2002)

David Bruce Aven (born March 4, 1972) is an American former Major League Baseball outfielder. Aven attended and played baseball for the Lamar University Cardinals.

Aven played for four different baseball clubs during his career: the Cleveland Indians (1997, 2002), Florida Marlins (1999), Pittsburgh Pirates (2000), and Los Angeles Dodgers (2000–2001). He made his Major League Baseball debut on August 27, 1997. Aven last played in a Major League game on May 27, 2002. He is now a baseball coach at American Heritage School in Plantation, Florida.
