= Juan Brito (catcher) =

Dominican baseball player (born 1977)

- Catcher
- Born: November 7, 1977 (age 48); Santiago, Dominican Republic
- Batted: Right Threw: Right

MLB debut
- May 3, 2002, for the Kansas City Royals

Last MLB appearance
- October 3, 2004, for the Arizona Diamondbacks

MLB statistics
- Batting average: .216
- Home runs: 3
- Runs batted in: 13
- Stats at Baseball Reference

Teams
- Kansas City Royals (2002); Arizona Diamondbacks (2004)

Juan Brito (born November 7, 1977) is a Dominican former professional baseball catcher. He played in Major League Baseball (MLB) from 2002 to 2004 for the Kansas City Royals and Arizona Diamondbacks.

== Career ==
Brito last played for the Washington Nationals' Triple-A affiliate, the Columbus Clippers in 2007. In 62 total appearances for Columbus, he slashed .240/.294/.357 with three home runs and 24 RBI.

Brito played in the 2006 World Baseball Classic for the Dominican Republic team.
