= Scott Mullen =

American baseball player (born 1975)

- Pitcher
- Born: January 17, 1975 (age 51); San Benito, Texas, U.S.
- Batted: Right Threw: Left

MLB debut
- August 31, 2000, for the Kansas City Royals

Last MLB appearance
- August 3, 2003, for the Los Angeles Dodgers

MLB statistics
- Win–loss record: 4–5
- Earned run average: 4.66
- Strikeouts: 35
- Stats at Baseball Reference

Teams
- Kansas City Royals (2000–2003); Los Angeles Dodgers (2003); Yokohama BayStars (2004); Yomiuri Giants (2005)

Kenneth Scott Mullen (born January 17, 1975) is an American former pitcher in Major League Baseball. He played for the Kansas City Royals and Los Angeles Dodgers from 2000 to 2003.

Mullen played college baseball at The Citadel, The Military College of South Carolina and Dallas Baptist University. In 1995, he played collegiate summer baseball with the Wareham Gatemen of the Cape Cod Baseball League.

Mullen was drafted in the seventh round (199th overall) of the 1996 MLB draft by the Kansas City Royals. He spent five seasons in the Royals' minor league system before making his Major League debut in 2000 and spent parts of the next three seasons with the Royals before he was traded to the Los Angeles Dodgers in 2003 (with Victor Rodriguez) for Gookie Dawkins. He pitched primarily for the Dodgers minor league team in 2003, but spent part of the year in the majors.

In 2005, he pitched in Japan and then returned to the United States in 2006 to play for the Richmond Braves in AAA.
