= Donzell McDonald =

American baseball player (born 1975)

- Outfielder
- Born: February 20, 1975 (age 51); Long Beach, California, U.S.
- Batted: Both Threw: Right

MLB debut
- April 19, 2001, for the New York Yankees

Last MLB appearance
- June 21, 2002, for the Kansas City Royals

MLB statistics
- Batting average: .200
- Home runs: 0
- Runs batted in: 1
- Stats at Baseball Reference

Teams
- New York Yankees (2001); Kansas City Royals (2002)

Donzell McDonald (born February 20, 1975) is an American former outfielder who played parts of two seasons in Major League Baseball from 2001 to 2002.

== Early life ==
Born in Long Beach, California, McDonald grew up in Fort Collins, Colorado. He attended Cherry Creek High School, then went on to Trinidad Community College and later moved to Yavapai College with coach Nino Giarratano.

== Professional career ==
Donzell was drafted by the New York Yankees in the 22nd round, 618th overall, in the 1995 Major League Baseball draft. The switch hitting center fielder was known for his speed; twice he stole over 50 bases in the minor leagues, and six times stole more than 30.

He made his major league debut in 2001. He played 5 games with the Yankees that year, getting one hit in three at bats, he would also appear in ten games for the Kansas City Royals in 2002. He was last in the Yankees farm system in 2004, after being in the Cleveland Indians, Kansas City Royals, and Atlanta Braves farm systems. He played for several seasons in the Mexican League and different independent leagues, last appearing in a professional game in 2010 when he played center field for Acereros de Monclova.

== Personal ==
McDonald resides in Arizona and currently serves as a pro scout/roving coach for the Texas Rangers organization.

Donzell is the older brother of former outfielder Darnell McDonald and cousin of former pitcher James McDonald.

== Honors and awards ==
- 1996 New York–Penn League All-Star Team
