= Jason Beverlin =

American baseball player (born 1973)

- Pitcher
- Born: November 27, 1973 (age 52); Ashtabula, Ohio, U.S.
- Batted: Left Threw: Right

Professional debut
- MLB: July 29, 2002, for the Cleveland Indians
- NPB: April 13, 2003, for the Yakult Swallows

Last appearance
- MLB: September 28, 2002, for the Detroit Tigers
- NPB: August 19, 2006, for the Yokohama BayStars

MLB statistics
- Win–loss record: 0–3
- Earned run average: 8.69
- Strikeouts: 16

NPB statistics
- Win–loss record: 17–19
- Earned run average: 5.08
- Strikeouts: 204
- Stats at Baseball Reference

Teams
- Cleveland Indians (2002); Detroit Tigers (2002); Yakult Swallows (2003–2004); Yokohama BayStars (2006)

Jason Robert Beverlin (born November 27, 1973) is an American baseball coach and former pitcher, who is the current pitching coach of the Coastal Carolina Chanticleers. The native of Royal Oak, Michigan played college baseball at Western Carolina as well as in Major League Baseball (MLB) and Nippon Professional Baseball (NPB). He played one season in the United States and three seasons in Japan. He also served as the head coach of Bethune–Cookman Wildcats (2012–2017).

== Playing career ==
Beverlin attended Western Carolina University, and in 1993 he played collegiate summer baseball with the Cotuit Kettleers of the Cape Cod Baseball League.

Beverlin was selected in the fourth round of the 1994 Major League Baseball draft by the Oakland Athletics. The next summer, he was traded to the New York Yankees along with Rubén Sierra in exchange for Danny Tartabull. He became a minor league free agent following the 2000 season and signed with the Anaheim Angels. After a single season in their farm system, he again became a free agent and signed with the Cleveland Indians.

In 2002, Beverlin made his Major League Baseball (MLB) debut. That year he played with both the Cleveland Indians and Detroit Tigers. He spent three of the next four seasons pitching in Japan with the Yakult Swallows and Yokohama BayStars. In 2007, he briefly played for the Buffalo Bisons, the Triple-A affiliate of the Cleveland Indians.

== Coaching career ==
Following his professional playing career, Beverlin became a college baseball coach. Prior to the start of the 2008 season, he was named the pitching coach at Georgia Southern, where he coached from 2008 to 2009. From 2010 to 2011, he was the pitching coach at Tennessee.

Prior to the start of the 2012 season, Beverlin was named the head coach at Bethune-Cookman.

=== Head coaching records ===
The following is a table of Beverlin's yearly records as an NCAA Division I head baseball coach.

Statistics overview
Season	Team	Overall	Conference	Standing	Postseason
Bethune-Cookman Wildcats (Mid-Eastern Athletic Conference) (2012–2017)
2012	Bethune-Cookman	34–27	18–5	1st (South)	NCAA Regional
2013	Bethune-Cookman	34–25	17–7	t-1st (South)	
2014	Bethune-Cookman	27–33	14–10	t-1st (South)	NCAA Regional
2015	Bethune-Cookman	19–40	14–10	2nd (South)	
2016	Bethune-Cookman	29–27	17–7	2nd (South)	NCAA Regional
2017	Bethune-Cookman	36–25	15–8	1st (South)	NCAA Regional
Bethune-Cookman:		179–177	95–47		
Total:		179–177			
National champion Postseason invitational champion Conference regular season champion Conference regular season and conference tournament champion Division regular season champion Division regular season and conference tournament champion Conference tournament champion
