= Juan Acevedo =

Mexican baseball player (born 1970)

- Pitcher
- Born: May 5, 1970 (age 55); Ciudad Juárez, Mexico
- Batted: Right Threw: Right

MLB debut
- April 30, 1995, for the Colorado Rockies

Last MLB appearance
- August 5, 2003, for the Toronto Blue Jays

MLB statistics
- Win–loss record: 28–40
- Earned run average: 4.33
- Strikeouts: 350
- Saves: 53
- Stats at Baseball Reference

Teams
- Colorado Rockies (1995); New York Mets (1997); St. Louis Cardinals (1998–1999); Milwaukee Brewers (2000); Colorado Rockies (2001); Florida Marlins (2001); Detroit Tigers (2002); New York Yankees (2003); Toronto Blue Jays (2003)

Juan Carlos Acevedo (born May 5, 1970) is a Mexican former professional baseball pitcher who played in Major League Baseball (MLB) for eight teams, over eight seasons. He pitched in the Mexican League after his MLB retirement.

== Biography ==
Acevedo attended Dundee-Crown High School in Carpentersville, Illinois, where as a senior he had an 8–0 record in baseball. After high school, Acevedo attended Parkland College in Champaign, Illinois. He was drafted by the Colorado Rockies in 1992 as a 14th round amateur pick. Acevedo signed with them June 3, 1992, and debuted April 30, 1995.

During his career, Acevedo served primarily as a relief pitcher, starting only 34 of his 366 games played. Known as a journeyman, Acevedo played for the Colorado Rockies, Detroit Tigers, Florida Marlins, Milwaukee Brewers, New York Mets, New York Yankees, St. Louis Cardinals, and Toronto Blue Jays during an eight-year career. He was a part-time closer for the Cardinals in 1998, taking over in the second half of the season for struggling veteran Jeff Brantley. He finished his MLB career with a 4.33 ERA and a 28–40 win–loss record. His 28 saves in a season for Detroit in 2002 was a record for a Mexican-born pitcher. He retired after the 2003 season.

Rob Neyer and Bill James credit Acevedo as having thrown a mid-90s four seam fastball and a cut fastball.

In early 2002, Acevedo married Sonja Ptach. They have three children together. Soon after their marriage, Acevedo retired as an MLB player and began pitching for Monterrey of the Mexican League. Ptach filed for divorce in 2005 for irreconcilable difference and mental cruelty. The divorce was settled with Acevedo being ordered to pay off their former home.

Throughout his MLB career Acevedo made upwards of $4.5 million, but a failed restaurant investment, credit card and cell phone debt, along with money owed to the Illinois Department of Revenue caused Acevedo to not pay off his mortgage as ordered. In March 2010, Acevedo was sentenced to six months in jail for contempt of court. The charge was related to a violation of the financial terms of his divorce settlement.

== See also ==
- Best pitching seasons by a Detroit Tiger
