= Óscar Henríquez =

Venezuelan baseball player (born 1974)

- Relief pitcher
- Born: January 28, 1974 (age 52); La Guaira, Vargas, Venezuela
- Batted: Right Threw: Right

MLB debut
- September 7, 1997, for the Houston Astros

Last MLB appearance
- September 8, 2002, for the Detroit Tigers

MLB statistics
- Win–loss record: 1–2
- Earned run average: 6.06
- Strikeouts: 45

KBO statistics
- Win–loss record: 0–3
- Earned run average: 9.00
- Strikeouts: 4
- Stats at Baseball Reference

Teams
- Houston Astros (1997); Florida Marlins (1998); Hyundai Unicorns (2001); Detroit Tigers (2002)

Óscar Eduardo Henríquez [en-ree'-kayz] (born January 28, 1974) is a Venezuelan former relief pitcher in Major League Baseball who played for the Houston Astros (1997), Florida Marlins (1998) and Detroit Tigers (2002) in parts of three seasons spanning 1997–2002. Listed at 6' 6", 220 lb., Henríquez batted and threw right handed. He was born in La Guaira, Vargas. In the 1997 season he was with the New Orleans Zephyrs before being called up to the Astros. During the 1996 season he pitched with the Kissimmee Astros of the Gulf Coast league and ranked fifth on the team in strikeouts with 40.

== Career ==
Henríquez was signed as a free agent by the Houston Astros in 1991. Because of his immense size and overpowering fastball, Henríquez became a celebrity in his native Venezuela, where he was dubbed Manacho.

In 1995, Henríquez was diagnosed with myasthenia gravis, a rare disorder that affects the nervous system and causes muscle weakness. He had a surgery to remove the thymus gland in the upper neck, and later came down with pneumonia in both lungs. But Henriquez recovered and told the Astros he would be back, and the organization stood by him.

In a 49-game career, Henríquez posted a 1–2 record with a 6.06 ERA and two saves, including 45 strikeouts and 30 walks in 52 innings of work.

In between, Henríquez played winter ball with the Cardenales de Lara, Navegantes del Magallanes and Tiburones de La Guaira clubs of the Venezuelan League in 12 seasons spanning 1992–2006, and also pitched for the Hyundai Unicorns of Korea Professional Baseball in 2001. In 2005 he pitched for San Marino in the Italian Baseball League.

== See also ==
- List of Major League Baseball players from Venezuela
