= Frank Castillo =

American baseball player (1969–2013)

- Pitcher
- Born: April 1, 1969; El Paso, Texas, U.S.
- Died: July 28, 2013 (aged 44); Bartlett Lake, Arizona, U.S.
- Batted: Right Threw: Right

MLB debut
- June 27, 1991, for the Chicago Cubs

Last MLB appearance
- May 26, 2005, for the Florida Marlins

MLB statistics
- Win–loss record: 82–104
- Earned run average: 4.56
- Strikeouts: 1,101
- Stats at Baseball Reference

Teams
- Chicago Cubs (1991–1997); Colorado Rockies (1997); Detroit Tigers (1998); Toronto Blue Jays (2000); Boston Red Sox (2001–2002, 2004); Florida Marlins (2005)

Frank Anthony Castillo (April 1, 1969 – July 28, 2013) was an American Major League Baseball starting pitcher. Castillo played for the Chicago Cubs (1991–1997), Colorado Rockies (1997), Detroit Tigers (1998), Toronto Blue Jays (2000), Boston Red Sox (2001–2002, 2004), and Florida Marlins (2005).

== Career ==
A sixth-round pick by the Cubs in the 1987 amateur draft, Castillo made his major league debut in 1991.

On September 25, 1995, in a 7–0 shutout victory over the St. Louis Cardinals at Wrigley Field, Castillo had a no-hitter broken up with two out in the ninth inning by inches. Bernard Gilkey hit a two-strike, line drive that fell in for a hit, despite an all-out attempt by Sammy Sosa to make a diving catch. The ball rolled to the wall for a triple, the only hit Castillo allowed. He struck out a career-high 13, including the first two batters in the ninth. Castillo was trying to become the first Cubs pitcher to throw a no-hitter since Milt Pappas against the San Diego Padres on September 2, 1972, which also was the last no-hitter hurled at Wrigley Field.

His most productive season came in 1995, when he posted career numbers in wins (11), earned run average (ERA) (3.21) and shutouts (2), while matching a career-high 135 strikeouts in 188 innings pitched.

Castillo briefly retired from Major League Baseball after receiving a World Series ring as a member of the 2004 Boston Red Sox. He pitched one game with the Florida Marlins in 2005. He returned to baseball in 2007 with the York Revolution of the independent Atlantic League and again played for them in 2008. He collected an 84–56 record and a 3.72 ERA in 14 minor league seasons spanning 1987–2008.

== Death ==
Castillo drowned in Bartlett Lake in Arizona on July 28, 2013, at the age of 44, while boating near his home with his family. At the time of his death, the last position in baseball he held was pitching coach for the Rookie League Mesa Cubs.
