= 2004 Toronto Blue Jays season =

2004 Toronto Blue Jays
- League: American League
- Division: East
- Ballpark: SkyDome
- City: Toronto
- Record: 67–94 (.414)
- Divisional place: 5th
- Owners: Rogers; Paul Godfrey (CEO)
- General managers: J. P. Ricciardi
- Managers: Carlos Tosca, John Gibbons
- Television: The Sports Network (Pat Tabler, Rod Black); Rogers Sportsnet (Rob Faulds, John Cerutti)
- Radio: CJCL (AM) (Jerry Howarth, Tom Cheek, Mike Wilner)

The 2004 Toronto Blue Jays season was the franchise's 28th season of Major League Baseball. It resulted in the Blue Jays finishing fifth in the American League East with a record of 67 wins and 94 losses, their worst record since 1980. The Blue Jays' radio play-by-play announcer, Tom Cheek, called every Blue Jays game from the team's inaugural contest on April 7, 1977, until June 3, 2004, when he took two games off following the death of his father – a streak of 4,306 consecutive regular season games and 41 postseason games. It was the team's first season where Ace is the sole mascot, following the removal of Diamond at the end of the previous season.

== Transactions ==
Transactions by the Toronto Blue Jays during the off-season before the 2004 season.

=== September 2003 ===
September 29	Ken Huckaby granted free agency (signed with Texas Rangers to a one-year contract on November 19, 2003). Doug Linton granted free agency (signed with Kansas City Royals to a one-year contract on January 16, 2004). John Wasdin granted free agency (signed with Texas Rangers to a one-year contract on October 22, 2003).
September 30	DeWayne Wise granted free agency (signed with Atlanta Braves to a one-year, $325,000 contract on October 25, 2003).

=== October 2003 ===
October 8	Released Doug Creek.
October 15	Bruce Aven granted free agency. Brian Bowles granted free agency (signed with Milwaukee Brewers to a one-year contract on December 12, 2003). Mike Colangelo granted free agency (signed with Florida Marlins to a one-year contract on January 28, 2004). Dan Reichert granted free agency (signed with Milwaukee Brewers to a one-year contract on February 25, 2004). Anthony Sanders granted free agency (signed with Colorado Rockies to a contract on February 5, 2004). Tanyon Sturtze granted free agency (signed with Los Angeles Dodgers to a contract on December 19, 2003). Corey Thurman granted free agency (signed with Cincinnati Reds to a contract on November 26, 2003). Scott Wiggins granted free agency (signed with Milwaukee Brewers to a contract on November 24, 2003).
October 26	Kelvim Escobar granted free agency (signed with Anaheim Angels to a three-year, $18.75 million contract on November 24, 2003). Cory Lidle granted free agency (signed with Cincinnati Reds to a one-year, $2.75 million contract on January 6, 2004).
October 28	Re-signed Frank Catalanotto to a one-year, $2.3 million contract.

=== November 2003 ===
November 18	Signed free agent Pat Hentgen from the Baltimore Orioles to a one-year, $2.2 million contract. Acquired Ted Lilly from the Oakland Athletics for Bobby Kielty.
November 20	Signed free agent Dave Maurer to a one-year contract.
November 26	Signed free agent Bruce Chen from the Boston Red Sox to a contract.

=== December 2003 ===
December 9	Signed free agent Kerry Ligtenberg from the Baltimore Orioles to a two-year, $4.5 million contract.
December 14	As part of three-team trade: Acquired Justin Speier from the Colorado Rockies. Traded a player to be named later to the Colorado Rockies (Sandy Nin on December 15, 2003). Traded Mark Hendrickson to the Tampa Bay Devil Rays. In addition, the Tampa Bay Devil Rays sent Joe Kennedy to the Colorado Rockies.
December 18	Signed free agent Miguel Batista from the Arizona Diamondbacks to a three-year, $13.1 million contract.
December 21	Trever Miller granted free agency (signed with Tampa Bay Devil Rays to a one-year, $650,000 contract on January 7, 2004). Cliff Politte granted free agency (signed with Chicago White Sox to a one-year, $800,000 on January 7, 2004).
December 27	Signed free agent Valerio De Los Santos from the Philadelphia Phillies to a one-year, $850,000 contract.

=== January 2004 ===
January 1	Signed free agent Jayson Durocher from the Milwaukee Brewers to a one-year contract.
January 7	Signed free agent Terry Adams from the Philadelphia Phillies to a one-year, $1.7 million contract. Signed free agent Chris Gomez from the Minnesota Twins to a one-year, $750,000 contract. Signed free agent Chad Hermansen from the Los Angeles Dodgers to a one-year contract. Signed Mark Lukasiewicz from the Anaheim Angels to a one-year contract. Tom Wilson selected off of waivers by the San Diego Padres.
January 14	Re-signed Ted Lilly to a two-year, $5 million contract.
January 20	Re-signed Justin Speier to a one-year, $1.6 million contract.
January 22	Re-signed Roy Halladay to a four-year, $42 million contract.

=== March 2004 ===
March 5	Released Pete Walker.
March 29	Acquired Jason Frasor from the Los Angeles Dodgers for Jayson Werth.
March 31	Selected Sean Douglass off waivers from the Minnesota Twins.

== Regular season ==
=== Summary ===
The 2004 season was a disappointing year for the Blue Jays right from the beginning. They started the season 0–8 at SkyDome and never started a lengthy winning streak. Much of that was due to injuries to All-Stars Carlos Delgado, Vernon Wells and Roy Halladay among others. Although the additions of starting pitchers Ted Lilly and Miguel Batista and reliever Justin Speier were relatively successful, veteran Pat Hentgen faltered throughout the season and retired on July 24. Rookies and minor league callups David Bush, Jason Frasor, Josh Towers and others filled the void in the rotation and the bullpen; however, inconsistent performances were evident. Most starting pitchers did not pitch further than the sixth inning; thus, the overused bullpen contributed to the frequent relinquishing of early scoring leads.

The offense really sputtered due to the injuries of Wells, Delgado, Catalanotto and others, although in their absence, Josh Phelps emerged as the team's go to guy, hitting 12 homers and driving in 51 runs before being limited to playing against left-handed pitching and was traded to the Cleveland Indians. Five different catchers were used: Greg Myers, Bobby Estalella, Kevin Cash, Gregg Zaun, and rookie Guillermo Quiróz. Greg Myers was injured running the bases in Minnesota, early in the season, and was lost for the year. Bobby Estalella was called up, but he proved to be brittle as well. Gregg Zaun landed the starting catching job for the rest of the season. Kevin Cash continued to struggle from an offensive standpoint and would be moved in the offseason. The highly touted Guillermo Quiróz was promoted from the minors near the end of the season.

With the team struggling in last place and mired in a five-game losing streak, manager Carlos Tosca was fired on August 8, 2004, and was replaced by first-base coach John Gibbons through the end of the season. The Jays' trying year would also touch long-time radio announcer Tom Cheek, who had to break his streak of calling all 4,306 regular season games in franchise history, upon the death of his father. Cheek had to take more time off later to remove a brain tumor, and by the end of the season, Cheek only called the home games.

Nevertheless, prospects Russ Adams, Gabe Gross, and Alex Ríos provided excitement for the fans. Adams hit his first major league home run in his second game, in which Gross also earned his own first major league grand slam. Alex Ríos was among the MLB Rookie of the Year Award candidates. However, the award went to Bobby Crosby of the Oakland Athletics. Rookie pitchers David Bush, Gustavo Chacín and Jason Frasor also showed promise for the club's future. The Blue Jays' lone MLB All-Star Game representative in 2004 was pitcher Ted Lilly.

On October 2, 2004, the Toronto Blue Jays announced the dismissals of pitching coach Gil Patterson and first-base coach Joe Breeden, effective at the end of the season. One day later, the Blue Jays finished the 2004 campaign with a 3–2 loss against the New York Yankees in front of an announced crowd of 49,948. However, the Jays' annus horribilis continued after the game, when it was announced that former pitcher and current TV broadcaster John Cerutti died suddenly of natural causes at the age of only 44.

More losses to the Jays family came in the offseason. Canadian Baseball Hall of Fame member Bobby Mattick, the manager from 1980 to 1981 and perhaps the best baseball man in the organization, suffered a stroke and died at the age of 89. Mattick had also served as the Vice President of Baseball Operations for the Blue Jays. A few days before Christmas, the Jays also mourned the loss of former first baseman Doug Ault, who had hit two home runs in the team's inaugural game in 1977; he was only 54 years old.

Rogers Communications, the owner of the Jays, purchased SkyDome from Sportsco International in November 2004 for approximately $25 million CAD ($21.24 million USD), just a fraction of the construction cost.

Just days after superstar Carlos Delgado became a free agent after the club refused arbitration, the Jays announced the signing of Manitoban third baseman Corey Koskie, formerly of the Minnesota Twins. One month after Koskie was inked, the Jays traded pitching prospect Adam Peterson to the Arizona Diamondbacks for corner infielder/DH Shea Hillenbrand.

=== Season standings ===
AL East
Team	W	L	Pct.	GB	Home	Road
New York Yankees	101	61	.623	—	57‍–‍24	44‍–‍37
Boston Red Sox	98	64	.605	3	55‍–‍26	43‍–‍38
Baltimore Orioles	78	84	.481	23	38‍–‍43	40‍–‍41
Tampa Bay Devil Rays	70	91	.435	30½	41‍–‍39	29‍–‍52
Toronto Blue Jays	67	94	.416	33½	40‍–‍41	27‍–‍53

=== Record vs. opponents ===
2004 American League record Source: MLB Standings Grid – 2004
Team	ANA	BAL	BOS	CWS	CLE	DET	KC	MIN	NYY	OAK	SEA	TB	TEX	TOR	NL
Anaheim	—	6–3	4–5	5–4	4–5	7–2	7–0	5–4	5–4	10–9	13–7	6–1	9–10	4–5	7–11
Baltimore	3–6	—	10–9	2–4	3–3	6–0	6–3	4–5	5–14	0–7	7–2	11–8	5–2	11–8	5–13
Boston	5–4	9–10	—	4–2	3–4	6–1	4–2	2–4	11–8	8–1	5–4	14–5	4–5	14–5	9–9
Chicago	4–5	4–2	2–4	—	10–9	8–11	13–6	9–10	3–4	2–7	7–2	4–2	6–3	3–4	8–10
Cleveland	5–4	3–3	4–3	9–10	—	9–10	11–8	7–12	2–4	6–3	5–4	3–3	1–8	5–2	10–8
Detroit	2–7	0–6	1–6	11–8	10–9	—	8–11	7–12	4–3	4–5	5–4	3–3	4–5	4–2	9–9
Kansas City	0–7	3–6	2–4	6–13	8–11	11–8	—	7–12	1–5	2–7	2–5	3–6	4–5	3–3	6–12
Minnesota	4–5	5–4	4–2	10–9	12–7	12–7	12–7	—	2–4	2–5	5–4	4–5	5–2	4–2	11–7
New York	4–5	14–5	8–11	4–3	4–2	3–4	5–1	4–2	—	7–2	6–3	15–4	5–4	12–7	10–8
Oakland	9–10	7–0	1–8	7–2	3–6	5–4	7–2	5–2	2–7	—	11–8	7–2	11–9	6–3	10–8
Seattle	7–13	2–7	4–5	2–7	4–5	4–5	5–2	4–5	3–6	8–11	—	2–5	7–12	2–7	9–9
Tampa Bay	1–6	8–11	5–14	2–4	3–3	3–3	6–3	5–4	4–15	2–7	5–2	—	2–7	9–9	15–3
Texas	10–9	2–5	5–4	3–6	8–1	5–4	5–4	2–5	4–5	9–11	12–7	7–2	—	7–2	10–8
Toronto	5–4	8–11	5–14	4–3	2–5	2–4	3–3	2–4	7–12	3–6	7–2	9–9	2–7	—	8–10

=== Transactions ===
Transactions for the Toronto Blue Jays during the 2004 regular season.

==== April 2004 ====
April 9	Signed free agent Gregg Zaun from the Montreal Expos to a one-year contract. Selected Micheal Nakamura off waivers from the Minnesota Twins.
April 18	Sent Scott Cassidy to the Boston Red Sox as part of a conditional deal.

==== May 2004 ====
May 1	Sent Bruce Chen to the Baltimore Orioles as part of a conditional deal.
May 3	Received Stubby Clapp from the Cleveland Indians as part of a conditional deal.
May 12	Received Frank Menechino from the Oakland Athletics as part of a conditional deal.
May 21	Signed free agent Bobby Estalella from the Arizona Diamondbacks to a one-year contract.
May 27	Signed free agent Marvin Benard from the Chicago White Sox to a one-year contract.

==== June 2004 ====
June 2	Signed free agent Ryan Glynn from the Atlanta Braves to a contract.
June 16	Acquired Julius Matos from the Montreal Expos for G.J. Raymundo.
June 23	Received Anthony Sanders from the Colorado Rockies as part of a conditional deal.

==== July 2004 ====
July 14	Released Mark Lukasiewicz.
July 24	Acquired John Hattig from the Boston Red Sox for Terry Adams.

==== August 2004 ====
August 2	Signed free agent Jesús Sánchez from the Cincinnati Reds to a contract.
August 4	Acquired Eric Crozier from the Cleveland Indians for Josh Phelps.

==== September 2004 ====
September 2	Released Marvin Benard.
September 13	Re-signed Frank Catalanotto to a two-year, $5.4 million contract.

=== 2004 draft picks ===
The 2004 MLB draft was held on June 7–8. The Blue Jays had two compensation picks.

Round	Pick	Player	Position	College/School	Nationality	Signed
1	16	David Purcey	LHP	Oklahoma	(United States)	2004–07–20
1	32*	Zach Jackson	LHP	Texas A&M	(United States)	2004–07–23
2	57	Curtis Thigpen	C	Texas	(United States)	2004–07–09
3	83*	Adam Lind	1B	South Alabama	(United States)	2004–06–16
3	87	Danny Hill	RHP	Missouri	(United States)	2004–06–16
4	117	Casey Janssen	RHP	UCLA	(United States)	2004–06–16
5	147	Ryan Klosterman	SS	Vanderbilt	(United States)	2004–06–22
6	177	Preston Patton	OF	Texas A&M	(United States)	–
7	207	Randy Dicken	RHP	Shippensburg	(United States)	2004–06–16
8	237	Rhame Cannon	1B	The Citadel	(United States)	2004–06–16
9	267	Joseph Metropoulos	1B	Southern California	(United States)	2004–06–16
10	297	Brian Hall	2B	Stanford	(United States)	2004–06–16
24	717	Jesse Litsch	RHP	South Florida Community College	(United States)	–

- * The Blue Jays received the 32nd pick as compensation for loss of free agent Kelvim Escobar
- * The Blue Jays received the 83rd pick from the Los Angeles Angels of Anaheim as compensation for signing of free agent Kelvim Escobar

=== Roster ===
2004 Toronto Blue Jays
Roster
Pitchers: 51 Terry Adams; 43 Miguel Batista; 49 Dave Bush; 39 Gustavo Chacín; 50 Vinnie Chulk; 26 Valerio de los Santos; 24 Sean Douglass; 36 Bob File; 54 Jason Frasor; 48 Kevin Frederick; 51 Ryan Glynn; 32 Roy Halladay; 41 Pat Hentgen; 23 Jason Kershner; 35 Brandon League; 46 Kerry Ligtenberg; 31 Ted Lilly; 44 Aquilino López; 51 Dave Maurer; 34 Justin Miller; 53 Micheal Nakamura; 59 Adam Peterson; 30 Justin Speier; 7 Josh Towers	Catchers: 29 Kevin Cash; 20 Bobby Estalella; 28 Greg Myers; 16 Guillermo Quiróz; 9 Gregg Zaun; Infielders: 8 Russ Adams; 25 Carlos Delgado; 3 Chris Gomez; 11 Eric Hinske; 1 Orlando Hudson; 4 Frank Menechino; 17 Josh Phelps; 5 Chris Woodward	Outfielders: 2 Dave Berg; 27 Frank Catalanotto; 6 Howie Clark; 21 Gabe Gross; 33 Chad Hermansen; 37 Reed Johnson; 18 Simon Pond; 15 Alex Ríos; 10 Vernon Wells; Other batters: 17 Eric Crozier	Manager: 58 John Gibbons; 14 Carlos Tosca; Coaches: 56 Mike Barnett (hitting); 53 Joe Breeden (bench); 55 Brian Butterfield (third base); 58 John Gibbons (first base); 47 Gil Patterson (pitching); 52 Bruce Walton (bullpen)

=== Game log ===
2004 Game Log
April: 7–15 (Home: 1–8; Away: 6–7)

#	Date	Opponent	Score	Win	Loss	Save	Attendance	Record
1	April 5	Tigers	7–0	Johnson (1–0)	Halladay (0–1)		47,817	0–1
2	April 6	Tigers	7–3	Maroth (1–0)	Batista (0–1)	Robertson (1)	21,003	0–2
3	April 7	Tigers	6–3	Bonderman (1–0)	Hentgen (0–1)		13,100	0–3
4	April 9	@ Red Sox	10–5	Speier (1–0)	Timlin (0–1)		34,337	1–3
5	April 10	@ Red Sox	4–1	Martínez (1–1)	Halladay (0–2)	Foulke (2)	35,305	1–4
6	April 11	@ Red Sox	6–4 (12)	Malaska (1–0)	López (0–1)		34,286	1–5
7	April 13	@ Tigers	7–5	Adams (1–0)	Patterson (0–1)	Speier (1)	8,804	2–5
8	April 14	@ Tigers	5–3	Robertson (1–0)	Lilly (0–1)	Patterson (1)	15,129	2–6
9	April 15	@ Tigers	11–0	Halladay (1–2)	Johnson (1–2)		17,572	3–6
10	April 16	Orioles	11–2	Riley (1–0)	Batista (0–2)		14,239	3–7
11	April 17	Orioles	5–3	Ryan (1–0)	Speier (1–1)	Julio (1)	20,177	3–8
12	April 18	Orioles	7–0	DuBose (1–2)	Hentgen (0–2)		16,842	3–9
13	April 20	Red Sox	4–2	Martínez (2–1)	Halladay (1–3)	Foulke (4)	26,010	3–10
14	April 21	Red Sox	4–2	Wakefield (2–0)	Lilly (0–2)	Foulke (5)	16,163	3–11
15	April 22	Red Sox	7–3	Adams (2–0)	Schilling (2–1)		16,480	4–11
16	April 23	@ Orioles	11–3	DuBose (2–2)	Towers (0–1)		26,827	4–12
17	April 24	@ Orioles	5–4 (12)	Ligtenberg (1–0)	DeJean (0–1)		41,093	5–12
18	April 25	@ Orioles	15–3	Halladay (2–3)	Ponson (2–1)		31,028	6–12
19	April 26	@ Twins	6–1	Lilly (1–2)	Radke (2–2)		13,859	7–12
20	April 27	@ Twins	7–4	Rincón (3–0)	Speier (1–2)		14,029	7–13
21	April 28	@ Twins	9–5	Rincón (4–0)	Frasor (0–1)		15,164	7–14
22	April 29	@ White Sox	6–4	Loaiza (4–0)	Nakamura (0–1)	Koch (2)	11,210	7–15
--	April 30	@ White Sox	Postponed (rain) Rescheduled for May 1					

May: 15–14 (Home: 13–6; Away: 2–8)

#	Date	Opponent	Score	Win	Loss	Save	Attendance	Record
23	May 1	@ White Sox	4–3 (10)	Takatsu (1–0)	Speier (1–3)			7–16
24	May 1	@ White Sox	10–6	Lilly (2–2)	Wright (0–4)		22,072	8–16
25	May 2	@ White Sox	3–2	Garland (2–1)	Batista (0–3)	Koch (3)	15,550	8–17
26	May 3	Royals	3–2 (10)	Field (1–0)	Adams (2–1)	Cerda (1)	13,007	8–18
27	May 4	Royals	5–4	Hentgen (1–2)	May (0–4)	Frasor (1)	20,011	9–18
28	May 5	Royals	10–3	Halladay (3–3)	Anderson (1–3)		14,103	10–18
29	May 7	White Sox	5–4	Adams (3–1)	Politte (0–1)		15,661	11–18
30	May 8	White Sox	4–2	Frasor (1–1)	Cotts (0–1)	Adams (1)	18,368	12–18
31	May 9	White Sox	5–2	Miller (1–0)	Loaiza (4–2)	Ligtenberg (1)	17,546	13–18
32	May 10	@ Royals	9–3	Hentgen (2–2)	Anderson (1–4)		13,803	14–18
33	May 11	@ Royals	5–1	Camp (2–0)	Halladay (3–4)		15,779	14–19
34	May 12	@ Royals	4–3	Field (2–0)	Adams (3–2)		29,309	14–20
35	May 13	Red Sox	12–6	Batista (1–3)	Schilling (4–3)		20,876	15–20
36	May 14	Red Sox	9–3	Embree (2–0)	Ligtenberg (1–1)		20,948	15–21
37	May 15	Red Sox	4–0	Arroyo (2–1)	Hentgen (2–3)		36,841	15–22
38	May 16	Red Sox	3–1	Halladay (4–4)	Martínez (4–3)	Adams (2)	31,618	16–22
39	May 17	Twins	9–5	Rincón (6–2)	Nakamura (0–2)	Fultz (1)	13,502	16–23
40	May 18	Twins	5–3	Batista (2–3)	Santana (2–1)	Adams (3)	25,405	17–23
41	May 19	Twins	6–5	Fultz (2–1)	Adams (3–3)	Nathan (13)	25,675	17–24
42	May 21	@ Red Sox	11–5	Timlin (3–1)	Nakamura (0–3)		35,287	17–25
43	May 22	@ Red Sox	5–2	Martínez (1–0)	Ligtenberg (1–2)	Foulke (9)	35,196	17–26
44	May 23	@ Red Sox	7–2	Wakefield (4–2)	Batista (2–4)		35,239	17–27
45	May 24	Angels	6–5 (10)	Frasor (2–1)	Weber (0–2)		15,301	18–27
46	May 26	Angels	6–5	Adams (4–3)	Percival (2–1)		14,515	19–27
47	May 27	Angels	3–2	Halladay (5–4)	Washburn (7–2)	Frasor (2)	14,773	20–27
48	May 28	Rangers	5–4	Lilly (3–2)	Dickey (4–5)	Frasor (3)	16,394	21–27
49	May 29	Rangers	6–2	Batista (3–4)	Dominguez (0–1)		30,704	22–27
50	May 30	Rangers	4–2	Rogers (8–2)	Miller (1–1)	Cordero (16)	22,225	22–28
51	May 31	@ Mariners	6–2	Moyer (4–2)	Hentgen (2–4)		27,856	22–29

June: 12–15 (Home: 6–6; Away: 6–9)

#	Date	Opponent	Score	Win	Loss	Save	Attendance	Record
52	June 1	@ Mariners	6–5	López (1–1)	Nageotte (0–1)	Frasor (4)	24,848	23–29
53	June 2	@ Mariners	5–3	Lilly (4–2)	Piñeiro (1–7)	Ligtenberg (2)	25,317	24–29
54	June 3	@ Athletics	2–1 (11)	Bradford (3–1)	Adams (4–4)		10,879	24–30
55	June 4	@ Athletics	6–1	Towers (1–1)	Bradford (3–2)	Chulk (1)	12,822	25–30
56	June 5	@ Athletics	4–0	Hudson (6–2)	Hentgen (2–5)		20,772	25–31
57	June 6	@ Athletics	8–3	Redman (4–3)	Kershner (0–1)		24,092	25–32
58	June 8	Dodgers	7–1	Lilly (5–2)	Nomo (3–6)		16,499	26–32
59	June 9	Dodgers	4–0	Batista (4–4)	Lima (4–2)		18,003	27–32
60	June 10	Dodgers	6–1	Ishii (8–3)	Towers (1–2)		16,267	27–33
61	June 11	Diamondbacks	3–2	Choate (1–0)	Frasor (2–2)	Valverde (7)	14,259	27–34
62	June 12	Diamondbacks	15–4	Halladay (6–4)	Good (0–1)	Chulk (2)	30,349	28–34
63	June 13	Diamondbacks	5–3	Johnson (9–4)	Lilly (5–3)	Valverde (8)	22,766	28–35
64	June 15	@ Giants	4–3	Schmidt (8–2)	Batista (4–5)	Herges (17)	36,737	28–36
65	June 16	@ Giants	10–2	Rueter (3–6)	Hentgen (2–6)		36,834	28–37
66	June 17	@ Giants	8–5	Brower (4–3)	Speier (1–4)	Herges (18)	40,464	28–38
67	June 18	@ Padres	3–2	Lilly (6–3)	Wells (2–5)	Frasor (5)	40,511	29–38
68	June 19	@ Padres	3–2	Linebrink (3–1)	Speier (1–5)	Hoffman (15)	40,307	29–39
69	June 20	@ Padres	3–0	Batista (5–5)	Lawrence (8–5)	Frasor (6)	41,060	30–39
70	June 22	Devil Rays	5–1	Harper (2–0)	Hentgen (2–7)		15,646	30–40
71	June 23	Devil Rays	2–1 (10)	Frasor (3–2)	Colomé (1–1)		14,713	31–40
72	June 24	Devil Rays	19–13	Halama (4–1)	Lilly (6–4)		14,876	31–41
73	June 25	Expos	3–1	Towers (2–2)	Day (5–8)	Frasor (7)	16,484	32–41
74	June 26	Expos	10–5	Batista (6–5)	Downs (0–1)		23,875	33–41
75	June 27	Expos	9–4	Hernández (5–7)	Hentgen (2–8)		25,915	33–42
76	June 28	@ Devil Rays	10–2	Zambrano (8–4)	Halladay (6–5)		11,218	33–43
77	June 29	@ Devil Rays	4–0	Lilly (7–4)	Halama (4–2)		11,640	34–43
78	June 30	@ Devil Rays	6–2	Brazelton (2–0)	Towers (2–3)		10,560	34–44

July: 11–14 (Home: 7–5; Away: 4–9)

#	Date	Opponent	Score	Win	Loss	Save	Attendance	Record
79	July 1	@ Devil Rays	14–0	Batista (7–5)	Hendrickson (5–6)		14,417	35–44
80	July 2	@ Expos †	2–0	Hernández (6–7)	Bush (0–1)		8,220	35–45
81	July 3	@ Expos †	2–0	Halladay (7–5)	Armas (1–3)	Frasor (8)	8,831	36–45
82	July 4	@ Expos †	6–4	Hill (1–1)	Lilly (7–5)	Horgan (1)	8,279	36–46
83	July 6	Mariners	7–6	Batista (8–5)	Moyer (6–5)	Frasor (9)	16,262	37–46
84	July 7	Mariners	12–4	Towers (3–3)	Blackley (1–1)		18,513	38–46
85	July 8	Mariners	10–8	Speier (2–5)	Guardado (2–1)		16,188	39–46
86	July 9	Angels	5–4	Colón (6–8)	Halladay (7–6)	Percival (14)	15,071	39–47
87	July 10	Angels	11–2	Escobar (5–5)	Lilly (7–6)		20,635	39–48
88	July 11	Angels	5–2	Lackey (7–8)	Batista (8–6)	Percival (15)	17,573	39–49
89	July 16	@ Rangers	11–2	Drese (5–5)	Halladay (7–7)		44,348	39–50
90	July 17	@ Rangers	4–0	Rodríguez (3–0)	Lilly (7–7)		43,189	39–51
91	July 18	@ Rangers	7–5	Brocail (1–1)	Chulk (0–1)	Cordero (28)	24,334	39–52
92	July 19	@ Athletics	5–3	Towers (4–3)	Saarloos (1–1)	Frasor (10)	15,480	40–52
93	July 20	@ Athletics	1–0 (14)	Lehr (1–1)	Speier (2–6)		18,885	40–53
94	July 21	@ Yankees	10–3	Vázquez (11–6)	Hentgen (2–9)		53,031	40–54
95	July 22	@ Yankees	1–0	Rivera (1–0)	Chulk (0–2)		53,657	40–55
96	July 23	Devil Rays	7–4	Batista (9–6)	Hendrickson (7–8)	Frasor (11)	16,633	41–55
97	July 24	Devil Rays	4–2	Towers (5–3)	Bell (3–4)	Frasor (12)	18,841	42–55
98	July 25	Devil Rays	5–3	Bush (1–1)	Zambrano (9–7)	Ligtenberg (3)	15,784	43–55
99	July 26	Yankees	6–5 (10)	Rivera (2–1)	Frasor (3–3)		30,041	43–56
100	July 27	Yankees	7–4	Proctor (1–0)	Ligtenberg (1–3)	Gordon (3)	30,087	43–57
101	July 28	Yankees	3–2 (10)	Frasor (4–3)	Proctor (1–1)		31,385	44–57
102	July 30	@ Devil Rays	3–0	Towers (6–3)	Halama (5–5)	Frasor (13)	10,531	45–57
103	July 31	@ Devil Rays	6–5	Sosa (3–0)	Bush (1–2)	Báez (21)	17,418	45–58

August: 10–20 (Home: 5–10; Away: 5–10)

#	Date	Opponent	Score	Win	Loss	Save	Attendance	Record
104	August 1	@ Devil Rays	5–3	Brazelton (4–3)	Douglass (0–1)	Báez (22)	10,750	45–59
105	August 2	Indians	6–1	Lilly (8–7)	Lee (10–4)		17,549	46–59
106	August 3	Indians	7–6	Speier (3–6)	Betancourt (4–5)	Frasor (14)	15,025	47–59
107	August 4	Indians	14–5	Westbrook (9–5)	Towers (6–4)		15,675	47–60
108	August 5	Indians	6–3 (10)	Betancourt (5–5)	Ligtenberg (1–4)	Wickman (2)	30,037	47–61
109	August 6	@ Yankees	11–4	Vázquez (13–6)	Douglass (0–2)		48,900	47–62
110	August 7	@ Yankees	6–0	Hernández (4–0)	Lilly (8–8)		54,025	47–63
111	August 8	@ Yankees	8–2	Lieber (8–7)	Batista (9–7)		52,616	47–64
112	August 9	@ Yankees	5–4	Towers (7–4)	Loaiza (9–6)	Frasor (15)	49,853	48–64
113	August 10	@ Indians	2–0	Durbin (5–4)	Bush (1–3)	Wickman (5)	19,942	48–65
114	August 11	@ Indians	3–2	Sabathia (9–6)	Frederick (0–1)	Wickman (6)	23,696	48–66
115	August 12	@ Indians	6–2	Riske (6–2)	Ligtenberg (1–5)		22,734	48–67
116	August 13	Orioles	4–0	Ponson (8–12)	Batista (9–8)		21,234	48–68
117	August 14	Orioles	7–2	Towers (8–4)	Borkowski (3–3)		35,768	49–68
118	August 15	Orioles	11–7	Groom (3–0)	Chulk (0–3)		26,132	49–69
119	August 16	@ Red Sox	8–4	Lowe (11–10)	Miller (1–2)	Foulke (20)	35,271	49–70
120	August 17	@ Red Sox	5–4	Foulke (3–3)	Frederick (0–2)		35,105	49–71
121	August 18	@ Red Sox	6–4	Wakefield (9–7)	Batista (9–9)		34,867	49–72
122	August 20	@ Orioles	14–4	Towers (9–4)	Borkowski (3–4)		35,024	50–72
123	August 21	@ Orioles	10–4	Bush (2–3)	Cabrera (9–6)		38,079	51–72
124	August 22	@ Orioles	8–5	Miller (2–2)	Bédard (5–8)	Frasor (16)	44,482	52–72
125	August 23	Red Sox	3–0	Lilly (9–8)	Martínez (13–5)		27,145	53–72
126	August 24	Red Sox	5–4	Wakefield (10–7)	Batista (9–10)	Foulke (23)	22,217	53–73
127	August 25	Red Sox	11–5	Schilling (16–6)	Towers (9–5)		22,479	53–74
128	August 26	Yankees	7–4	Nitkowski (1–1)	Frasor (4–4)	Rivera (44)	35,682	53–75
129	August 27	Yankees	8–7	Sturtze (5–2)	Miller (2–3)	Gordon (4)	35,436	53–76
130	August 28	Yankees	18–6	Brown (10–3)	Lilly (9–9)	Rivera (45)	43,541	53–77
131	August 29	Yankees	6–4	Batista (10–10)	Mussina (9–8)	Frasor (17)	44,072	54–77
132	August 31	Mariners	7–5	Atchison (2–2)	Ligtenberg (1–6)	Putz (6)	21,174	54–78

September: 10–15 (Home: 6–5; Away: 4–10)

#	Date	Opponent	Score	Win	Loss	Save	Attendance	Record
133	September 1	Mariners	4–2	Bush (3–3)	Villone (5–5)	Speier (2)	22,310	55–78
134	September 2	Mariners	8–6	File (1–0)	Baek (1–1)	Speier (3)	23,374	56–78
135	September 3	Athletics	7–4	Hudson (11–4)	Lilly (9–10)	Dotel (18)	28,488	56–79
136	September 4	Athletics	9–5	Hammond (4–1)	Frasor (4–5)		29,149	56–80
137	September 5	Athletics	13–5	Glynn (1–0)	Harden (9–6)		28,327	57–80
138	September 7	@ Angels	5–2	Colón (14–11)	Bush (3–4)	Percival (27)	36,277	57–81
139	September 8	@ Angels	1–0	Miller (3–3)	Escobar (9–10)	Speier (4)	36,905	58–81
140	September 9	@ Angels	5–4	Lilly (10–10)	Washburn (11–6)	Speier (5)	37,514	59–81
141	September 10	@ Rangers	10–3	Drese (12–8)	Batista (10–11)		24,617	59–82
142	September 11	@ Rangers	10–7	Mahay (3–0)	Frasor (4–6)	Cordero (43)	40,587	59–83
143	September 12	@ Rangers	7–6	Brocail (3–1)	Speier (3–7)	Cordero (44)	20,434	59–84
144	September 13	Orioles	9–1	Chen (1–0)	Miller (3–4)		18,372	59–85
145	September 15	Orioles	3–0	Lilly (11–10)	Riley (1–4)	Speier (6)	19,942	60–85
146	September 16	Orioles	9–5	López (13–8)	Batista (10–12)		21,451	60–86
147	September 17	Devil Rays	11–4	Waechter (4–7)	Towers (9–6)		25,987	60–87
148	September 18	Devil Rays	4–2	Bush (4–4)	Ritchie (0–1)	Batista (1)	33,432	61–87
149	September 19	Devil Rays	9–7	Chulk (1–3)	Kazmir (2–2)	Speier (7)	30,714	62–87
150	September 20	@ Yankees	6–3	Chacín (1–0)	Vázquez (14–10)	Batista (2)	10,732	63–87
151	September 21	@ Yankees	5–3	Loaiza (10–7)	Halladay (7–8)	Rivera (50)	36,675	63–88
152	September 22	@ Yankees	5–4	Lilly (12–10)	Hernández (8–1)	Batista (3)	49,560	64–88
153	September 24	@ Devil Rays	4–2	Hendrickson (10–15)	Towers (9–7)	Báez (29)	13,003	64–89
154	September 25	@ Devil Rays	6–5	Báez (4–3)	Batista (10–13)		20,978	64–90
--	September 26	@ Devil Rays	Cancelled (Hurricane Jeanne) Not rescheduled					
155	September 27	@ Orioles	4–1	League (1–0)	Ponson (11–15)	Batista (4)	17,809	65–90
--	September 28	@ Orioles	Postponed (rain) Rescheduled for September 29					
156	September 29	@ Orioles	7–6	Ryan (4–6)	Speier (3–8)			65–91
157	September 29	@ Orioles	4–0	Bauer (2–1)	Chacín (1–1)		20,600	65–92
158	September 30	@ Orioles	9–3	Riley (3–4)	Towers (9–8)		18,793	65–93

October: 1–2 (Home: 0–0; Away: 1–2)

#	Date	Opponent	Score	Win	Loss	Save	Attendance	Record
159	October 1	Yankees	7–0	Bush (5–4)	Hernández (8–2)		48,914	66–93
160	October 2	Yankees	4–2	Halladay (8–8)	Brown (10–6)	Batista (5)	50,498	67–93
161	October 3	Yankees	3–2	Proctor (2–1)	Towers (9–9)	Sturtze (1)	49,948	67–94

† At Hiram Bithorn Stadium in San Juan, Puerto Rico.

== Player stats ==
= Indicates team leader

=== Batting ===
==== Starters by position ====
Note: Pos = Position; G = Games played; AB = At bats; H = Hits; Avg. = Batting average; HR = Home runs; RBI = Runs batted in

Pos	Player	G	AB	H	Avg.	HR	RBI
C	Gregg Zaun	107	338	91	.269	6	36
1B	Carlos Delgado	128	458	123	.269	32	99
2B	Orlando Hudson	135	489	132	.270	12	58
SS	Chris Gomez	109	341	96	.282	3	37
3B	Eric Hinske	155	570	140	.246	15	69
LF	Reed Johnson	141	537	145	.270	10	61
CF	Vernon Wells	134	536	146	.272	23	67
RF	Alex Ríos	111	426	122	.286	1	28
DH	Josh Phelps	79	295	70	.237	12	51

==== Other batters ====
Note: G = Games played; AB = At bats; H = Hits; Avg. = Batting average; HR = Home runs; RBI = Runs batted in

Player	G	AB	H	Avg.	HR	RBI
Frank Catalanotto	75	249	73	.293	1	26
Frank Menechino	71	236	71	.301	9	25
Chris Woodward	69	213	50	.235	1	24
Kevin Cash	60	181	35	.193	4	21
Dave Berg	58	154	39	.253	3	23
Gabe Gross	44	129	27	.209	3	16
Howie Clark	40	115	25	.217	3	12
Russ Adams	22	72	22	.306	4	10
Guillermo Quiróz	17	52	11	.212	0	6
Simon Pond	16	49	8	.163	1	6
Eric Crozier	14	33	5	.152	2	4
Greg Myers	8	18	4	.222	0	1
Bobby Estalella	5	13	3	.231	0	0
Chad Hermansen	4	7	0	.000	0	0

=== Pitching ===
==== Starting pitchers ====
Note: G = Games pitched; IP = Innings pitched; W = Wins; L = Losses; ERA = Earned run average; SO = Strikeouts

Player	G	IP	W	L	ERA	SO
Miguel Batista	38	198.2	10	13	4.80	104
Ted Lilly	32	197.1	12	10	4.06	168
Roy Halladay	21	133.0	8	8	4.20	95
Josh Towers	21	116.1	9	9	5.11	51
Dave Bush	16	97.2	5	4	3.69	64
Justin Miller	19	81.2	3	4	6.06	47
Pat Hentgen	18	80.1	2	9	6.95	33
Gustavo Chacin	2	14.0	1	1	2.57	6

==== Other pitchers ====
Note: G = Games pitched; IP = Innings pitched; W = Wins; L = Losses; ERA = Earned run average; SO = Strikeouts

Player	G	IP	W	L	ERA	SO
Sean Douglass	14	38.2	0	2	6.28	36
Ryan Glynn	6	20.0	1	0	4.05	14

==== Relief pitchers ====
Note: G = Games pitched; W = Wins; L = Losses; SV = Saves; ERA = Earned run average; SO = Strikeouts

Player	G	W	L	SV	ERA	SO
Jason Frasor	63	4	6	17	4.08	54
Justin Speier	62	3	8	7	3.91	52
Kerry Ligtenberg	57	1	6	3	6.38	49
Vinnie Chulk	47	1	3	2	4.66	44
Terry Adams	42	4	4	3	3.98	35
Bob File	24	1	0	0	4.81	15
Jason Kershner	24	0	1	0	6.04	15
Kevin Frederick	22	0	2	0	6.59	22
Micheal Nakamura	19	0	3	0	7.36	24
Aquilino López	18	1	1	0	6.00	13
Valerio De Los Santos	17	0	0	0	6.17	10
Brandon League	3	1	0	0	0.00	0
Adam Peterson	3	0	0	0	16.88	2
Dave Maurer	3	0	0	0	54.00	1
Frank Menechino	1	0	0	0	0.00	0

== Award winners ==
- Vernon Wells, Gold Glove Award

All-Star Game

- Ted Lilly, pitcher

== Farm system ==
Level	Team	League	Manager
AAA	Syracuse SkyChiefs	International League	Marty Pevey
AA	New Hampshire Fisher Cats	Eastern League	Mike Basso
A	Dunedin Blue Jays	Florida State League	Omar Malavé
A	Charleston Alley Cats	South Atlantic League	Ken Joyce
A-Short Season	Auburn Doubledays	New York–Penn League	Dennis Holmberg
Rookie	Pulaski Blue Jays	Appalachian League	Gary Cathcart

LEAGUE CHAMPIONS: New Hampshire
