= Adam Peterson =

Adam Peterson may refer to:

- Adam Peterson (1990s pitcher) (born 1965), former MLB pitcher for the White Sox and Padres
- Adam Peterson (tennis) (born 1974), former American tennis player
- Adam Peterson (2000s pitcher) (born 1979), former MLB pitcher for the Blue Jays

== See also ==
- Adam Pettersson, ice hockey player
