= Tom Cheek =

American sports commentator (1939–2005)

- Born: June 13, 1939; Pensacola, Florida, U.S.
- Died: October 9, 2005 (aged 66); Oldsmar, Florida, U.S.
- Education: Cambridge School of Broadcasting
- Occupation: Toronto Blue Jays radio sportscaster
- Spouse: Shirley Cheek
- Children: 3
- Awards: Ford C. Frick Award (2013)
- Baseball career

Member of the Canadian

Baseball Hall of Fame
- Induction: 2013

Thomas F. Cheek (June 13, 1939 – October 9, 2005) was an American sports commentator who is best remembered as the play-by-play radio announcer for the Toronto Blue Jays of Major League Baseball (MLB), from the team's establishment in 1977 until his retirement in 2004. During that time, he covered a 27-year streak of 4,306 consecutive games plus 41 post-season games—from the first Blue Jays game on April 7, 1977, until June 3, 2004. He was inducted to the Blue Jays Level of Excellence in 2004.

Cheek's best-known call was perhaps his description of Joe Carter's dramatic title-clinching home run in Game 6 of the 1993 World Series, when he said, "Touch 'em all, Joe, you'll never hit a bigger home run in your life!" He is also author of the book Road to Glory, chronicling the first 16 years of Blue Jays baseball.

Cheek posthumously received the Ford C. Frick Award from the Baseball Hall of Fame in 2013 after being nominated as a finalist for the award every year since 2005.

== Biography ==
=== Early life ===
Born and raised in the west side of Pensacola, Florida, Cheek, an avid sports fan, was given his first tape recorder at age 14, which inspired his interest in broadcasting.

His father, also named Tom Cheek, was a well known United States Naval Aviator in World War II and a recipient of the Navy Cross at the Battle of Midway.

From 1957 to 1960, Tom Cheek (the son) served in the United States Air Force, where he spent a year in Morocco as a teletype operator with the Strategic Air Command as an airman third class. During this time he was introduced to New York Yankees broadcaster Red Barber. Following his discharge in 1960, he attended the Cambridge School of Broadcasting in Boston for two years.

=== Early broadcasting years ===
Cheek began his radio broadcasting career in Plattsburgh, New York, as a disc jockey on WEAV in 1962. He then moved to Burlington, Vermont, where he worked for WDOT and was quickly promoted to corporate sales manager and sports director. He later moved from music to sports broadcasting when he moved to WJOY, where his on-air sports work included baseball, basketball, football and hockey for the University of Vermont.

In 1968, he was almost hired as the first broadcaster for the newly formed Atlanta Hawks of the NBA, but Skip Caray was chosen instead.

The newly formed Montreal Expos were looking for an announcer to complement their primary play-by-play man, Dave Van Horne. Burlington, although traditionally a Boston Red Sox town, was warming up to the new expansion team as it was only 99 miles (159 km) from Montreal. When it was decided the Expos would use a guest announcer format, Cheek got his first broadcast experience in Major League Baseball, filling in there occasionally from 1974 to 1976.

=== Toronto Blue Jays ===
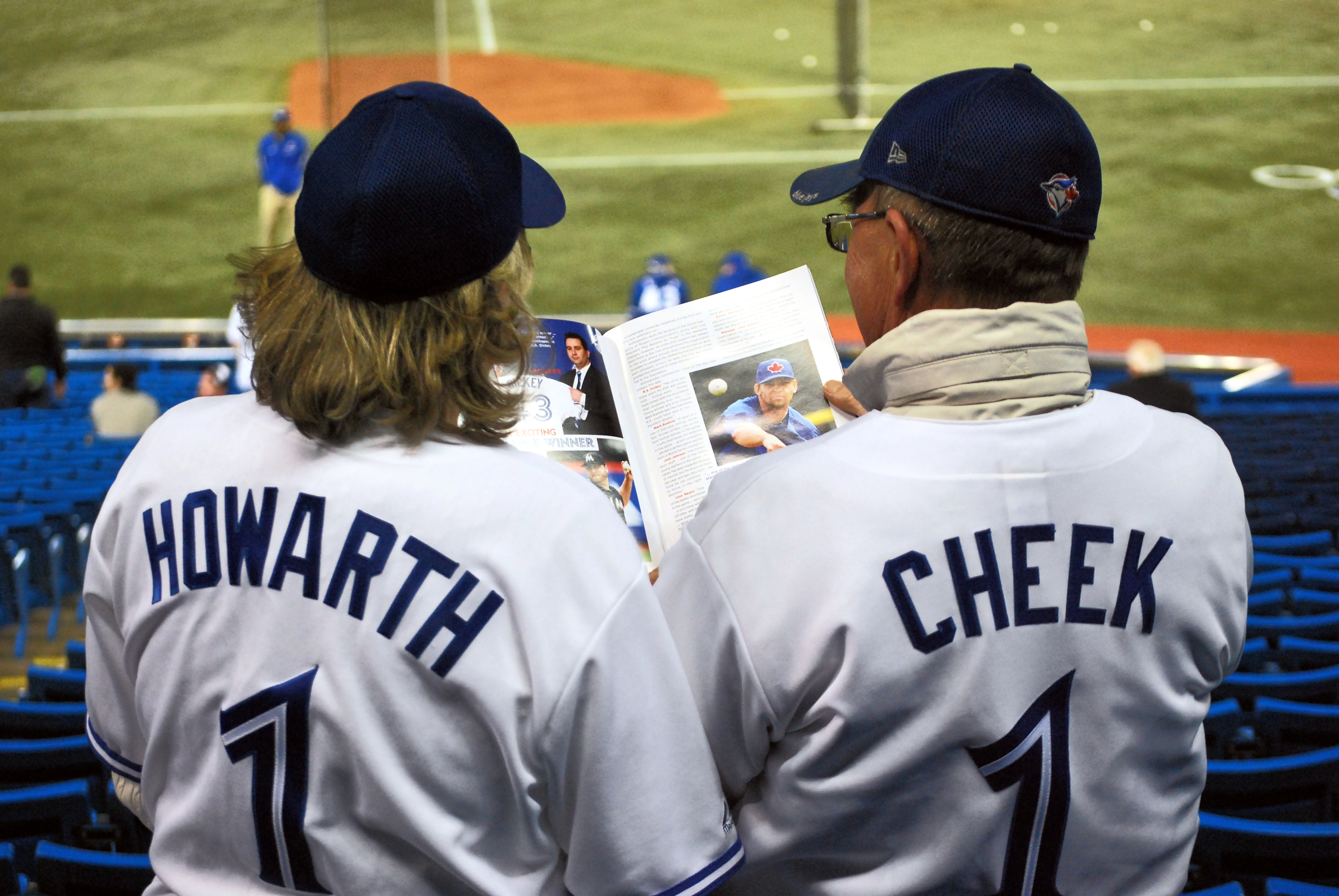
Toronto Blue Jays fans wearing jerseys honouring Tom Cheek and Jerry Howarth in 2013

Beginning in 1977, Cheek became the first full-time announcer for the Toronto Blue Jays alongside his first broadcast partner, Baseball Hall of Fame pitcher Early Wynn, who remained with him through the end of 1980. Wynn was replaced by Jerry Howarth in 1981.

For the next 23 years, "Tom and Jerry" were the radio voices of the Blue Jays, covering the team's rise through the 1980s and culminating with their back-to-back World Series Championships in 1992 and 1993. They were joined by color commentator Gary Matthews in 2000 and 2001.

Cheek's Blue Jays broadcasts originated from Toronto's CKFH "The Fan" 1430, founded by another legendary Toronto sports broadcaster, Hockey Hall of Fame member Foster Hewitt. For a brief period, the broadcast was heard on 1050 CHUM; but following the Blue Jays' purchase by Rogers Communications, reverted to "The Fan", which had changed its call sign and frequency to CJCL 590 AM, also known as FAN 590.

Cheek called many memorable moments in Blue Jays history, including many firsts; the Blue Jays' division-clinching game in 1985, and both final plays of the 1992 and 1993 World Series—the latter of which spawned his famous "Touch 'em all, Joe!" quote, when Joe Carter clinched the World Series on a walk-off home run for only the second time in World Series history.

==== "The Streak" ====
Tom Cheek's name on the Blue Jays Level of Excellence.

Cheek announced every Blue Jays game from their inaugural game at Exhibition Stadium, in Toronto, on April 7, 1977, until June 3, 2004, when he took two games off following the death of his father—a streak of 4,306 consecutive regular season and 41 postseason games. On August 9, 2004, the Jays raised a banner to SkyDome's (now the Rogers Centre) "Level of Excellence" bearing Cheek's name and, in place of a jersey number, 4,306—his streak of straight regular-season broadcasts.

=== Other broadcasting activities ===
Cheek was a member of the broadcast team for ABC Sports at the 1980 Winter Olympics in Lake Placid, and at the 1984 Winter Olympics in Sarajevo.

=== Illness and death ===
A week after his consecutive game streak ended, Cheek was forced to take time off to undergo surgery on June 12, 2004, to remove a brain tumor. Following the surgery, Cheek was able to call some Blue Jays home games while undergoing chemotherapy, but was replaced on the road by various guest announcers. For a time, it seemed he had recovered and would be able to resume calling Blue Jays games in 2005. However, the cancer returned and he required further treatment at Toronto's Mount Sinai Hospital and Toronto Western Hospital.

Cheek sat in with the new commentator, Canadian-born former minor league baseball infielder/outfielder Warren Sawkiw, and Howarth, to call an inning of the Blue Jays' 2005 opening game in Tampa Bay. This would be Cheek's final broadcast appearance.

Cheek died on October 9, 2005, at age 66 in Oldsmar, Florida. He was interred in the Sylvan Abbey Memorial Park in Clearwater, Florida.

== Personal life ==
Cheek married his wife, Shirley, of Hemmingford, Quebec, in 1959. They had three children—Jeff, Lisa, and Tom—and seven grandchildren at the time of his death. Jeff was a pitcher in the Blue Jays organization from 1992 to 1994.

== Awards and honors ==
Cheek was inducted into the Blue Jays Level of Excellence in 2004 with the number "4306" next to his name, signifying his broadcasting streak. Shortly before his death, Canada's Sports Hall of Fame established the Tom Cheek Media Leadership Award for "playing a key role in promoting Canadian sports"; Cheek himself was the recipient of the first award. During the 2006 season, the Blue Jays wore a white circular sewn-on patch with the letters TC, and a radio microphone in black, beside the letters on their uniform sleeves in tribute to Cheek.

For nine straight years (2005–2013), Cheek was among the ten finalists for the Ford C. Frick Award by the National Baseball Hall of Fame, an award presented each year, during the Hall's induction weekend, to a broadcaster for "major contributions to baseball". He received the 2013 award on December 5, 2012.

== Memorable calls ==
- On October 2, 1991, Cheek described the Blue Jays' win of the AL East this way:

Roberto Alomar has stolen his fifty-third base. A fly ball will win it now. Joe Carter at the plate. The winning run—the American League championship—ninety feet away. The pitch—a swing—and a base hit! And the Blue Jays are the champs! The Blue Jays are the champs of the American League East!

- On October 24, 1992, Cheek called the Blue Jays' first World Series championship:

Timlin to the belt... Pitch on the way... And there's a bunted ball, first base side, Timlin, to Carter, and the Blue Jays win it! The Blue Jays win it! The Blue Jays are World Series Champions!

- On October 23, 1993, Cheek called the Jays' back-to-back World Series championship with his famous call:

Joe has had his moments. Trying to lay off that ball, low to the outside part of the plate, he just went after one. Two balls and two strikes on him. Here's the pitch on the way, a swing and a belt! Left field, way back, BLUE JAYS WIN IT! The Blue Jays are World Series Champions, as Joe Carter hits a three-run home run in the ninth inning and the Blue Jays have repeated as World Series Champions! Touch 'em all, Joe, you'll never hit a bigger home run in your life!

== Bibliography ==
- Cheek, Tom; Howard Berger (1993). Road to Glory: An Insider's Look at 16 Years of Blue Jays Baseball. Los Angeles CA: Warwick Publishing. ISBN 1-895629-16-0.
