= Russ Adams =

American baseball player (born 1980)

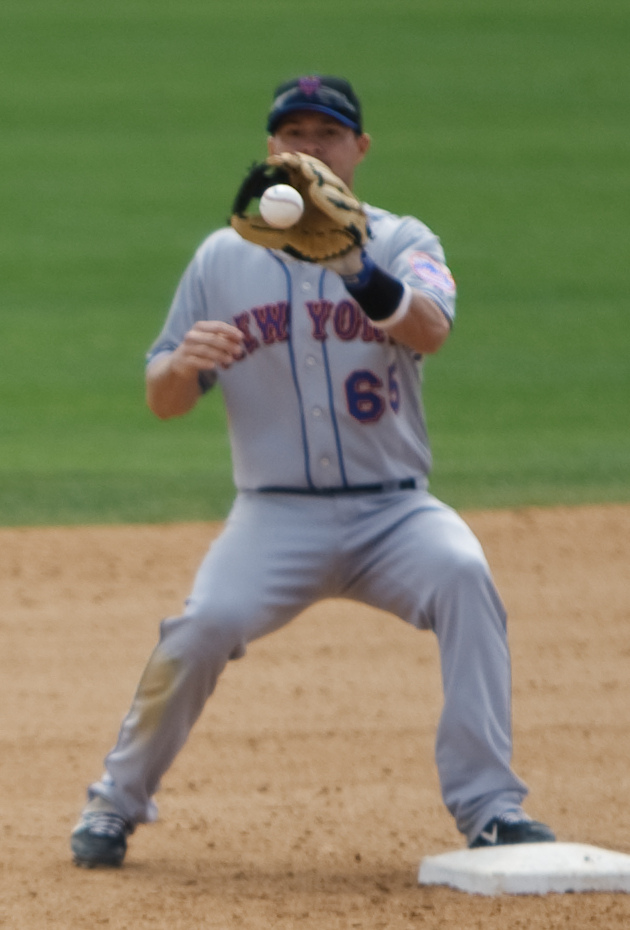
- Adams with the New York Mets
- Infielder
- Born: August 30, 1980 (age 46); Laurinburg, North Carolina, U.S.
- Batted: Left Threw: Right

MLB debut
- September 3, 2004, for the Toronto Blue Jays

Last MLB appearance
- June 30, 2009, for the Toronto Blue Jays

MLB statistics
- Batting average: .247
- Home runs: 17
- Runs batted in: 113
- Stats at Baseball Reference

Teams
- Toronto Blue Jays (2004–2007, 2009)

Russ Moore Adams (born August 30, 1980) is an American former professional baseball infielder. He played in Major League Baseball (MLB) for the Toronto Blue Jays.

== Collegiate career and draft ==
Adams attended Scotland High School in Laurinburg, North Carolina. At Scotland High, Adams was named All-Conference and All-State as a senior in 1999, while also being named conference player of the year. He signed to play college baseball at the University of North Carolina at Chapel Hill. In 2001, he played collegiate summer baseball with the Orleans Cardinals of the Cape Cod Baseball League and was named a league All-Star. After his strong season in 2002, when he batted .370 with 45 steals, led to the Toronto Blue Jays drafting him in the first round (14th overall) in the 2002 Major League Baseball draft.

== Professional career ==
=== Toronto Blue Jays ===
Adams was named to the New York–Penn League All-Star team in 2002 while playing for the Auburn Doubledays.

Adams was brought up to the major league club late in the 2004 season and had his official rookie season in 2005. He was used primarily in the lead-off position in the lineup. Adams finished the 2005 season with a .256 batting average, .325 OBP, 27 doubles, 5 triples, 8 home runs, and 11 stolen bases. Adams finished seventh in the AL in sacrifice flies and tenth in the American League in at bats per strikeout. Adams was named to the Topps Major League Rookie All-Star Team along with teammate Gustavo Chacín. However, he made 26 errors in the field for the Blue Jays and was often criticized for his throwing arm.

He played shortstop before being optioned to the Jays' Triple-A affiliate, the Syracuse Chiefs on May 25, 2006 (along with Josh Towers). On June 12, 2006, he was recalled by the Blue Jays after playing 17 games for Syracuse. After having trouble with the bat since his call up, and due to teammate Aaron Hill's struggles at short, he was removed as the second baseman, with Hill switching over to second and utility man John McDonald taking the shortstop role previously occupied by Hill. He was optioned back to Syracuse on July 30 so that he could receive more playing time.

Jays GM J.P. Ricciardi stated at the beginning of the 2007 season that Adams would begin 2007 in Triple-A, and would have to earn his way back onto the team. On August 17, 2007, Russ was recalled from Triple-A and played with the Jays as a utility infielder. On September 19, 2007, he recorded his first-ever major league grand slam, against Jonathan Papelbon of the Boston Red Sox.

On February 5, 2009, Adams was designated for assignment by the Blue Jays to make room for T. J. Beam on the 40-man roster. On February 11, he was outrighted to the Triple-A Las Vegas 51s. While with Las Vegas, he played some games in the infield and outfield, and spent a month on the disabled list with a broken hand, but hit over .300 while active. On June 21, Adams' contract was purchased from Triple-A by the Blue Jays, as Joe Inglett was optioned back to Las Vegas. Adams singled in a pinch-hitting appearance that day against the Washington Nationals. GM Ricciardi said Adams would be a reserve infielder, left fielder, designated hitter and pinch hitter with Toronto.

=== San Diego Padres ===
On July 3, 2009, Adams was designated for assignment by the Blue Jays after they called up David Dellucci from Triple-A Las Vegas. He cleared waivers and elected to become a free agent. He was claimed by the San Diego Padres, and then played with their AAA affiliate Portland Beavers.

=== New York Mets ===
He signed a minor league deal, including an invitation to Spring Training, with the New York Mets before the 2010 season. With the thyroid disease of Mets' starter, José Reyes, Adams was one of three contenders to temporarily replace Reyes, along with Alex Cora and Rubén Tejada. Adams is considered "an upgrade offensively from Cora and the unknown Tejada", but "no better a defensive replacement (career UZR/150 of -13.5) than the other two." [Italics added.] However, Adams did not make the team out of spring training. Adams was "earmarked for Buffalo."

Not making the team out of Spring Training, Adams played second base (No. 38) with the Mets Triple-A affiliate, the Buffalo Bisons. On April 15, 2010, he was injured turning a double play when Tug Hulett of the Pawtucket Red Sox, Boston's Triple-A affiliate, slid hard into him. Adams was helped off the field by his teammates and was replaced by Alex Cintrón. Adams entered the game hitting .286." Adams returned from injury for the April 21, 2010, game against the Rochester Red Wings, singling in the top of the third inning, but not scoring. On May 5, 2011, Adams retired from baseball at the age of 30.
