= Warren Sawkiw =

Canadian baseball player and scout

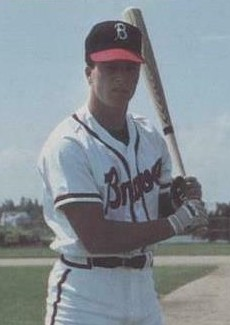
- Infielder / Utility player
- Born: January 19, 1968 (age 58); Toronto, Ontario, Canada
- Bats: Switch Throws: Right
- Stats at Baseball Reference

Warren Sawkiw (born January 19, 1968) is a Canadian former professional baseball player and broadcaster. As a player, he was listed at 5 feet 11 inches (1.80 m) and 185 pounds (84 kg); he threw right-handed and was a switch hitter.

== Biography ==
Born in Toronto, Ontario, Sawkiw played college baseball for the Wake Forest Demon Deacons. In 1988 and 1989, he played collegiate summer baseball with the Bourne Braves of the Cape Cod Baseball League and was named a league all-star in 1989. He was selected by the Detroit Tigers in the 1990 Major League Baseball draft. He went on to play in minor league and independent baseball from 1990 to 1998, appearing in a total of 658 games, compiling a .277 batting average. He was primarily an infielder, but also served as a utility player, appearing at every defensive position including pitcher. He started his professional career in 1990 with the Class A Short Season Niagara Falls Rapids, advanced as far as Triple-A with the Syracuse Chiefs in 1995, and finished his career in baseball with the independent Elmira Pioneers in 1998.

After his retirement from baseball as a player, Sawkiw joined TSN as a colour commentator on Montreal Expos games in 2001 and then Rogers Sportsnet as a studio analyst for the network's baseball coverage in 2003. After long-time Toronto Blue Jays radio broadcaster Tom Cheek was unable to serve as the team's lead radio play-by-play announcer in 2005 due to health issues, Sawkiw joined Jerry Howarth as an analyst on Blue Jays radio broadcasts. Sawkiw continued working in this capacity through the 2006 season, with former Blue Jays catcher and Houston Astros broadcaster Alan Ashby replacing Sawkiw in the broadcast booth in 2007. Sawkiw did color commentary for CBC Sports' coverage of baseball at the 2008 Summer Olympics. Sawkiw also served as the announcer for CBC Sports' coverage of baseball at the 2015 Pan American Games.
