= Jerry Howarth =

American-Canadian sportscaster

- Born: March 12, 1946 (age 80); York, Pennsylvania
- Citizenship: American 1946–present Canadian 1994–present
- Education: University of Santa Clara
- Occupation: Toronto Blue Jays play-by-play announcer
- Years active: 1981–2017

Jerry Howarth (born March 12, 1946) is an American Canadian former sports commentator, best known as the radio play-by-play voice of the Toronto Blue Jays from 1981 through the 2017 season.

Howarth had shared the play-by-play duties with his late longtime broadcast partner Tom Cheek from 1982 until 2005, then served as the play-by-play announcer until announcing his retirement before the start of spring training 2018 due to ongoing health concerns.

== Early career ==
Born in York, Pennsylvania, and raised in San Francisco, California, Howarth grew up an avid sports fan. He graduated with a degree in economics from the University of Santa Clara in 1968, then served two years as an officer in the U.S. Army. He launched his career as a sportscaster in 1974 by calling play-by-play action for AAA baseball's Tacoma Twins of the Pacific Coast League, as well as basketball and football for the University of Puget Sound in Tacoma, Washington.

In 1976, Howarth became the play-by-play voice of the Salt Lake City Gulls, also of the Pacific Coast League. Howarth was then hired as the assistant general manager and performed double duty as play-by-play man for the Utah Pros of the short-lived Western Basketball Association. Howarth was then hired as group sales director by the NBA's Utah Jazz before joining KWMS radio in Salt Lake as the station's sports talk show host.

== Toronto Blue Jays ==
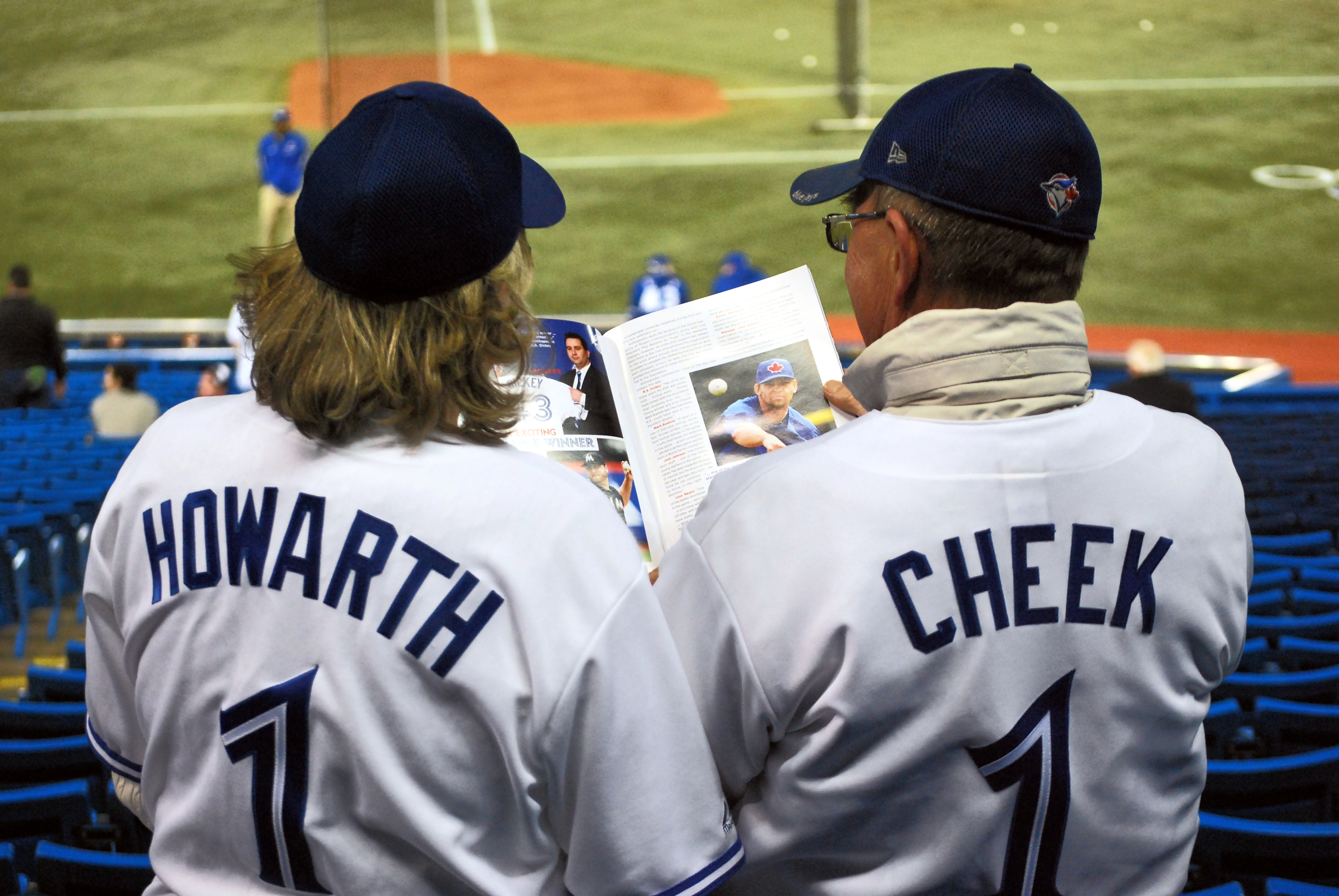
Toronto Blue Jays fans wearing jerseys honouring Jerry Howarth and Tom Cheek in 2013

=== The Tom and Jerry era ===
In 1981, Howarth split his time between his radio duties in Salt Lake and his new career in Toronto. He worked part of the 1981 Blue Jays season as a commentator along with Early Wynn for CJCL, part of the Hewpax Sports Network that owned the Jays’ radio rights at the time. Starting in the 1982 season, he replaced Wynn and joined Tom Cheek as his full-time play-by-play partner. For the next 23 years, "Tom and Jerry" would be the radio voices of the Blue Jays. Their partnership covered the rise of the Blue Jays through the 1980s, culminating with back to back World Series Championships in 1992 and 1993.

On June 3, 2004, Cheek missed calling a Blue Jays game for the first time in 27 years, because his father died. He returned to the booth a week later only to miss more games when he was hospitalized and had a brain tumour removed. He was diagnosed with brain cancer, but continued to broadcast with Howarth during home games, taking a few innings off to rest during these games. Cheek's health continued to deteriorate, eventually forcing him to discontinue his broadcasting career after the end of the 2004 Toronto Blue Jays season. Cheek died on 9 October 2005.

=== Play-by-play broadcaster ===
As it became clear in early 2005 that Cheek would not be coming back, Howarth became the play-by-play broadcaster for Blue Jays games at this time and Warren Sawkiw filled in as analyst. Sawkiw continued to work alongside Howarth through the end of the 2006 Blue Jays season. In 2007, Sawkiw was replaced in the booth by former Blue Jay catcher Alan Ashby. Howarth continued to be the lead voice of the Toronto Blue Jays with Ashby serving as game analyst, until the end of the 2012 season. Howarth next worked alongside former Jays pitcher and World Series champion Jack Morris during the 2013 season. After one season, Morris was replaced by Joe Siddall who worked with Horwarth from 2014 through to 2017. During this time, Mike Wilner, host of the Blue Jays Talk radio show, also provided play-by-play for some innings. Duane Ward supplied colour commentary for some games during the 2014 and 2015 season and Kevin Barker supplied colour for some games during the 2016 season.

=== Indigenous Team Names ===
In October 2016, prior to the American League Championship Series between Toronto and Cleveland, Howarth revealed — in an interview on CJCL radio — that in 1992, he had quietly taken a vow to not use team nicknames or expressions on-air that he considered to be offensive to aboriginal Canadians or Native Americans, such as the Atlanta Braves and Cleveland Indians. He began the practice after receiving a letter from a listener who was a member of a First Nation group, whose writer explained that the names were offensive. Howarth felt the letter was written "in such a loving, kind way" and that it had "touched [his] heart", which led him to respect their wishes. Renu Mandhane, chief commissioner of the Ontario Human Rights Commission, supported Howarth's position, and called upon other media outlets to stop using the name in the wake of Cleveland's playoff series.

=== Retirement ===
On November 16, 2016, it was announced that Howarth had been diagnosed with prostate cancer, and that he would undergo surgery in the following week to remove a small tumor from his prostate. For health reasons, Howarth decided to retire from broadcasting in February 2018.

== Personal ==
Howarth, who became a Canadian citizen in 1994, lives in Toronto with his wife Mary. They have two sons, Joe lives in Toronto, and Ben lives in Chicago.

Howarth coached high school basketball for 20 years at Etobicoke Collegiate Institute. He is also known for his active support and fund raising efforts on behalf of the Special Olympics.

== Awards ==
- On August 11, 2012, Howarth was awarded the Canadian Baseball Hall of Fame's Jack Graney Award.

== Works ==
- Howarth, Jerry (2019). Hello, Friends! Stories From My Life And Blue Jays Baseball. ECW Press. ISBN 978-1-77041-498-3.
