= Mike Wilner =

Canadian former baseball broadcaster

- Born: Michael Samuel Wilner; March 14, 1970 (age 56); Toronto, Ontario, Canada
- Education: University of Toronto
- Sports commentary career
- Team: Toronto Blue Jays
- Sport(s): Baseball, basketball, football, hockey

Michael Samuel Wilner (born March 14, 1970) is a Canadian former baseball broadcaster for the Toronto Blue Jays. From 2014 through 2020, he called play-by-play for the Blue Jays' radio broadcasts, and authored a blog on Sportsnet.ca/590. He formerly hosted a postgame radio call-in show called BlueJaysTalk on the Fan 590. He graduated from the University of Toronto in 1994 where he attended New College. As of February 11, 2021, Wilner has been a baseball columnist for the Toronto Star.

== Broadcasting career ==
Wilner began his broadcasting career at the University of Toronto in 1988, and was named sports director there a year later. During his tenure at the University of Toronto, Wilner did play-by-play for various sports including hockey, basketball, and football. Wilner began his professional broadcasting career at the age of 19 with the Class-A Welland Pirates. He later did play-by-play for various baseball teams including the Class-A Watertown Indians, and the Double-A Hardware City Rock Cats. During the 2010 Winter Olympics, Wilner covered the 2010 Winter Olympics for the Fan 590, running the Whistler bureau with David Alter from Whistler, British Columbia.

On June 1, 2010, Mike Wilner got into an argument during a media scrum with the Toronto Blue Jays manager Cito Gaston about Gaston's field level decision making. Wilner detailed the confrontation on his blog. A day later his employer, the Fan 590 announced Wilner would not be covering the team for several days, presumably a suspension though the Fan 590 refused to state the reason. Because Rogers Communications, owners of the Toronto Blue Jays, also owns the Fan 590, the suspension had at least the appearance of a case of media censorship. The Toronto Chapter of the Baseball Writers' Association of America issued a letter of protest suggesting the suspension was an attempt by the Blue Jays to muzzle media criticism. The controversy received coverage in all three of Toronto's daily newspapers, largely in sympathy with Wilner.

In 2013, Wilner became a full-time play-by-play caller, along with his Blue Jays Talk duties, for all 162 games. From 2014 to 2017, Wilner performed play-by-play duties for select innings of all Toronto Blue Jays home games and many road games in the absence of Jerry Howarth. In 2018, following the retirement of longtime Blue Jays play-by-play commentator Jerry Howarth, Wilner called most Blue Jays games with Ben Wagner. He officially became the full-time radio play-by-play announcer with Wagner prior to the 2019 season. That same year, he was replaced by Scott MacArthur as host of the BlueJaysTalk radio show.

Wilner continued as the Blue Jays play-by-play announcer through the 2020 season. However, on November 27, 2020, Sportsnet announced that Wilner would not return to the position in 2021. For his part, Wilner did not elaborate on any reasons behind the termination.

== Newspaper columnist ==
On February 11, 2021, Wilner announced that he had become a baseball columnist for the Toronto Star. Wilner's work for the Toronto Star also includes hosting a weekly baseball-themed podcast, titled Deep Left Field, where he interviews various guests.

== Personal life ==
Wilner is divorced, and together with his ex-wife from Buenos Aires, Argentina, they have two daughters and he resides in Mississauga.

Wilner's brother, Norman Wilner, has been a film critic for Now and a programmer for the Toronto International Film Festival.
