= Miguel Batista =

Dominican baseball player (born 1971)

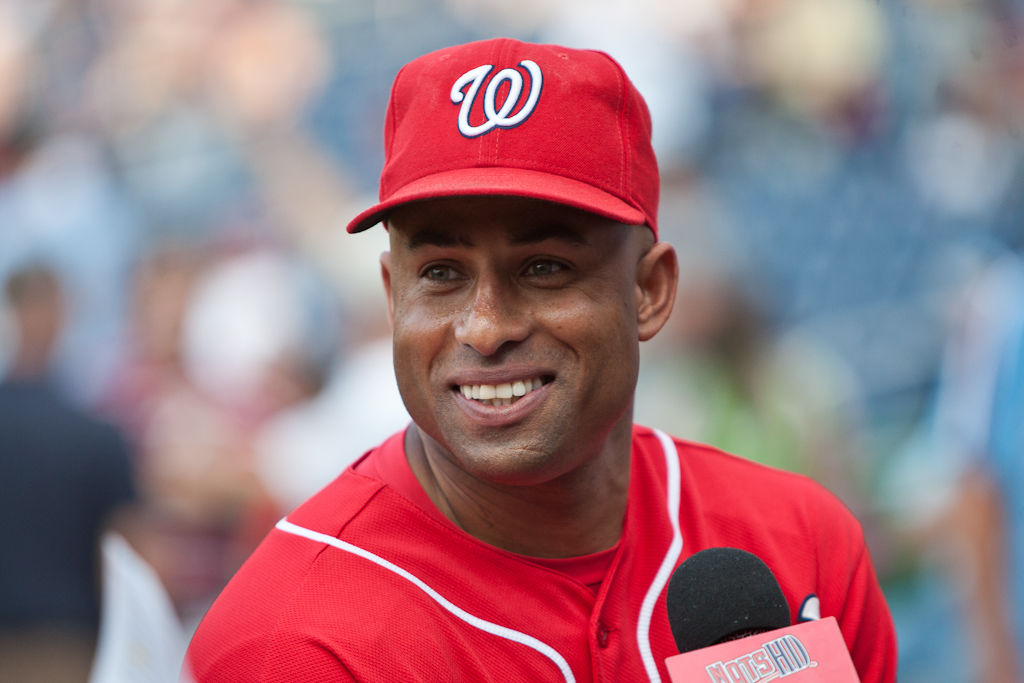
- Batista with the Washington Nationals
- Pitcher
- Born: February 19, 1971 (age 55); Santo Domingo, Dominican Republic
- Batted: Right Threw: Right

MLB debut
- April 11, 1992, for the Pittsburgh Pirates

Last MLB appearance
- September 11, 2012, for the Atlanta Braves

MLB statistics
- Win–loss record: 102–115
- Earned run average: 4.48
- Strikeouts: 1,250
- Stats at Baseball Reference

Teams
- Pittsburgh Pirates (1992); Florida Marlins (1996); Chicago Cubs (1997); Montreal Expos (1998–2000); Kansas City Royals (2000); Arizona Diamondbacks (2001–2003); Toronto Blue Jays (2004–2005); Arizona Diamondbacks (2006); Seattle Mariners (2007–2009); Washington Nationals (2010); St. Louis Cardinals (2011); New York Mets (2011–2012); Atlanta Braves (2012)

Career highlights and awards
- World Series champion (2001)

Miguel Descartes Batista Jerez (born February 19, 1971) is a Dominican former professional baseball pitcher. He played in Major League Baseball for 12 teams, spending multiple seasons with the Montreal Expos, Kansas City Royals, Arizona Diamondbacks, Toronto Blue Jays, Seattle Mariners, and New York Mets.

Batista was versatile, serving as a starter, reliever, and closer in his career. He signed as an international free agent with the Expos. He made his major league debut in 1992, pitching one game for the Pittsburgh Pirates after being selected in the Rule 5 Draft. He returned to the majors in 1996 and won the 2001 World Series with the Diamondbacks. He signed multi-year contracts with the Blue Jays before the 2004 season and Mariners ahead of the 2007 season. He continued pitching in MLB through the 2012 season.

== Playing career ==
=== Montreal Expos ===
Batista began playing baseball at age 15. When he was 17, he attended a try out and signed with the Montreal Expos. He pitched in the Dominican Summer League in 1988 and 1989. He made his American debut in 1990, pitching for the Gulf Coast Expos and Rockford Expos. He returned to Rockford for the 1991 season.

=== Pittsburgh Pirates ===
The Pittsburgh Pirates selected Batista in the 1991 Rule 5 Draft. He made his MLB debut on April 11, 1992, allowing a two-run home run to Rubén Amaro Jr. in two innings of relief. He was one of the youngest players in MLB that season. After that appearance, Pittsburgh sent him back to the Expos, and he would not return to the majors until August 1996.

=== Montreal Expos (second stint) ===
Batista returned to the Expos farm system, pitching for the West Palm Beach Expos for the rest of 1992. He pitched for the Double-A Harrisburg Senators in 1993 and 1994. The Expos released him after the season.

=== Florida Marlins ===
On December 9, 1994, Batista signed with the Florida Marlins. He advanced to Triple-A, pitching for the Charlotte Knights in 1995 and 1996. Batista returned to the majors in August 1996. In nine relief appearances in one month, he had a 5.56 ERA and 6 strikeouts in 11 1/3 innings.

=== Chicago Cubs ===
The Chicago Cubs claimed Batista off waivers on December 17, 1996. He started the 1997 season with the Triple-A Iowa Cubs. That August, he returned to the majors. In 11 games, including his first six MLB starts, he was 0–5 with a 5.70 ERA, 27 strikeouts, and 4 home runs allowed in 36 1/3 innings.

=== Montreal Expos (third stint) ===
The Cubs traded Batista to the Montreal Expos for outfielder Henry Rodríguez on December 12, 1997. The trade was a cost-saving move by the Expos, who did not want to pay Rodríguez his salary of more than $2 million.

Batista spent the entire 1998 season with the Expos. He joined the starting rotation at the end of April, earning his first MLB win on May 15. He returned to a relief role from May through August, then got five starts in September. He finished the season with a 3–5 win–loss record and 3.80 ERA in 135 innings. He was a swingman again in 1999. On April 14, he pitched his first complete game, allowing 1 run and striking out six Milwaukee Brewers batters. He threw his first complete game shutout on June 5 against the Toronto Blue Jays. He had an 8–7 record and 4.88 ERA in 134 2/3 innings over 39 games, including 17 starts. Batista started the 2000 season with Montreal, pitching poorly. He allowed 13 earned runs in 8 1/3 relief innings.

=== Kansas City Royals ===
The Expos traded Batista to the Kansas City Royals for pitcher Brad Rigby on April 25, 2000. He continued to pitch wildly, with 34 walks in 57 innings. He had a 2–6 record and 7.74 ERA with the Royals, starting 9 games and being a reliever in 5 games.

=== Arizona Diamondbacks ===
Batista's best seasons came in 2001 and 2003 with the Arizona Diamondbacks, when he went 11–8 and 10–9 with 3.36 and 3.54 ERAs respectively. He pitched 7 2/3 shutout innings at Yankee Stadium in Game 5 of the 2001 World Series. He faced one batter in Game 7 of the series, getting the second out of the eighth inning before Randy Johnson finished the game.

In 2001, Batista kept a photo of Albert Einstein in his locker. Manager Bob Brenly said Batista was "extremely well read, extremely well spoken and a very thoughtful, caring human being."

Batista started Game 3 of the 2002 National League Division Series, losing to the St. Louis Cardinals.

=== Toronto Blue Jays ===
Batista signed a three-year, $13.1-million contract with the Toronto Blue Jays in December 2003. He struggled in his first season with his new club, posting a 4.80 ERA and leading the American League with 94 walks. He lost his starter's job late in the season. In 2005, Batista was the Jays closer and had career highs with 31 saves and 8 blown saves. The Blue Jays then signed B. J. Ryan to a large contract to be their closer.

=== Arizona Diamondbacks (second stint) ===
The Blue Jays traded Batista back to the Diamondbacks during the 2005 offseason along with Orlando Hudson for Troy Glaus and prospect Sergio Santos. Batista's 2006 record in Arizona was 11–8 with an ERA of 4.58. He led the National League with 14 wild pitches.

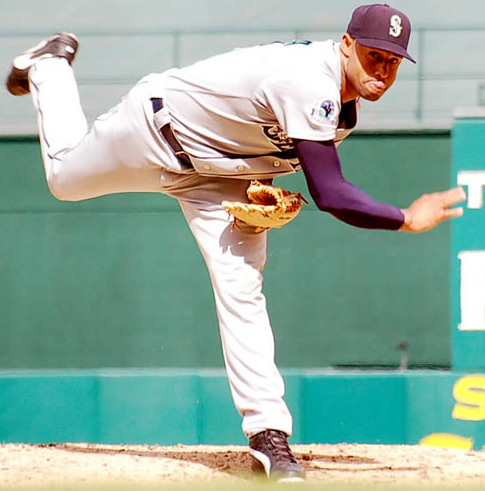
Batista with the Mariners in 2007

=== Seattle Mariners ===
After the season, the Diamondbacks offered Batista arbitration, as he was a free agent, but Arizona was not willing to commit to a multi-year contract. In December, Batista signed a three-year, $24 million contract with the Seattle Mariners. Batista had a solid first season with the Mariners, going 16–11 with a 4.29 ERA. During the offseason Batista pitches for the Aguilas Cibaeñas of the Dominican Winter League

During 2008, he had the lowest percentage of quality starts in the majors, at 25%, and the fewest innings pitched per start, at 4.6. He threw strikes in 57% of his pitches, the lowest rate in the majors. In 2009, he was moved to a long relief role in the bullpen.

On November 6, 2009, Batista declared free agency.

On September 2, 2009, Batista was nominated for the Roberto Clemente Award. He was nominated because in the off-season he traveled throughout the United States and Latin America to deliver baseball equipment, medical supplies, and speak to kids of all ages to stress the importance of education and determination. Batista said this about being nominated for helping the less fortunate:

I have been to so many countries and seen the reactions of so many kids when you do something for them, I think it's the most gratifying thing we can do. It would be a great honor for anything, but especially satisfying for a Latino player. I remember talking to [Albert] Pujols about it. He won it last year and we agreed that it probably means more to us than other people because of who Roberto Clemente was. There have been a lot of great Latin players, but no one did what he did.

=== Washington Nationals ===
On January 29, 2010, Batista agreed to a minor league contract with the Washington Nationals with an invite to spring training. It was his third stint with the organization, which relocated from Montreal.

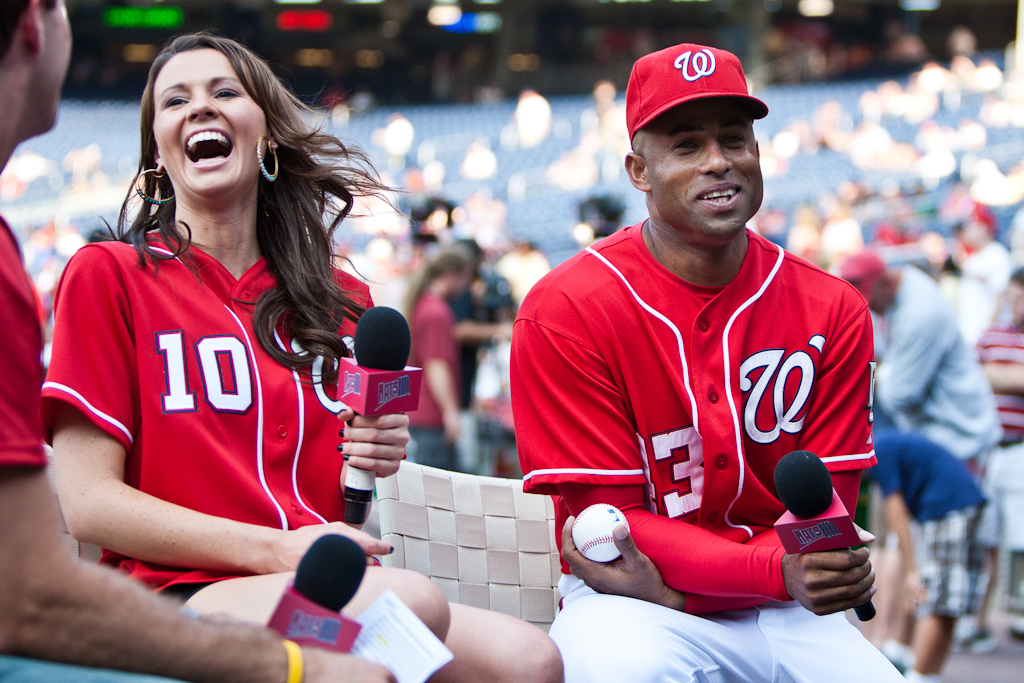
Batista (right) and Miss Iowa Katherine Connors in 2010

On July 27, Batista was called on to replace the injured Stephen Strasburg ten minutes before game time. Batista threw 5 shutout innings, allowing 3 hits and recording 6 strikeouts. Following the game, in which he was booed twice for replacing much-touted Stephen Strasburg, Batista told reporters, "Imagine, if you go there to see Miss Universe — and you end up having Miss Iowa." When Miss Iowa USA Katherine Connors heard about the comment, she replied in a statement, "I know I can throw a pitch or two! The question is, can Miguel Batista walk the runway in a swimsuit?" Batista sent her flowers and she was invited to throw a ceremonial pitch at Nationals Park on July 30. He later clarified his statement by saying, "People started booing me, and they hadn't seen me throw a pitch yet. It's like you hear 'Miss Iowa,' and you say, 'Iowa?' And then you see her up close and you say, 'Wow, she's gorgeous.'" Batista was invited to judge the 2011 Miss Iowa USA competition. Batista finished the season with a 3.87 ERA and became a free agent.

=== St. Louis Cardinals ===
Batista signed a minor league contract with the St. Louis Cardinals on January 14, 2011. In a spring training game, Batista hit Nationals shortstop Ian Desmond on the back. Later, when asked if the pitch hurt, Desmond replied, "Miggy throws like Miss Iowa. No big deal."

Batista made the opening day roster out of spring training. On Friday, April 22, with imminent severe weather moving into the area in the area and the increasingly likely threat of a rain delay at first pitch, the Cardinals opted to switch their starting pitcher for the game – calling on Batista to make his first start of the season in favor of scheduled starter Kyle McClellan. The rain began falling at the start of the game as predicted and the umpire crew opted for a rain delay. Two hours later the Cardinals were able to send their scheduled starter McClellan back to the mound while the opposing Cincinnati Reds had lost their starter.

The next day, this time after a 42-minute rain delay, the Cardinals again called on Batista – this time in relief in the 8th inning. After getting Ryan Hanigan to make the first out Batista ran into trouble. An error from third baseman David Freese put a man on 2nd with only one out. After striking out Brandon Phillips and intentionally walking Joey Votto, Batista hit Jonny Gomes with an 0–2 count to load the bases. He was then lifted in favor of lefty Trever Miller who would force home a run with a bases-loaded walk. Miller yielded to ex-closer Ryan Franklin who allowed a single by Miguel Cairo to plate two more runs and put Batista on the hook for the loss. Despite taking the loss, according to the commentators, Batista became the first pitcher since 2005 to start in a game and then relieve in the next game.

The Cardinals released Batista on June 22, after recording a 4.90 ERA in 29 1/3 innings.

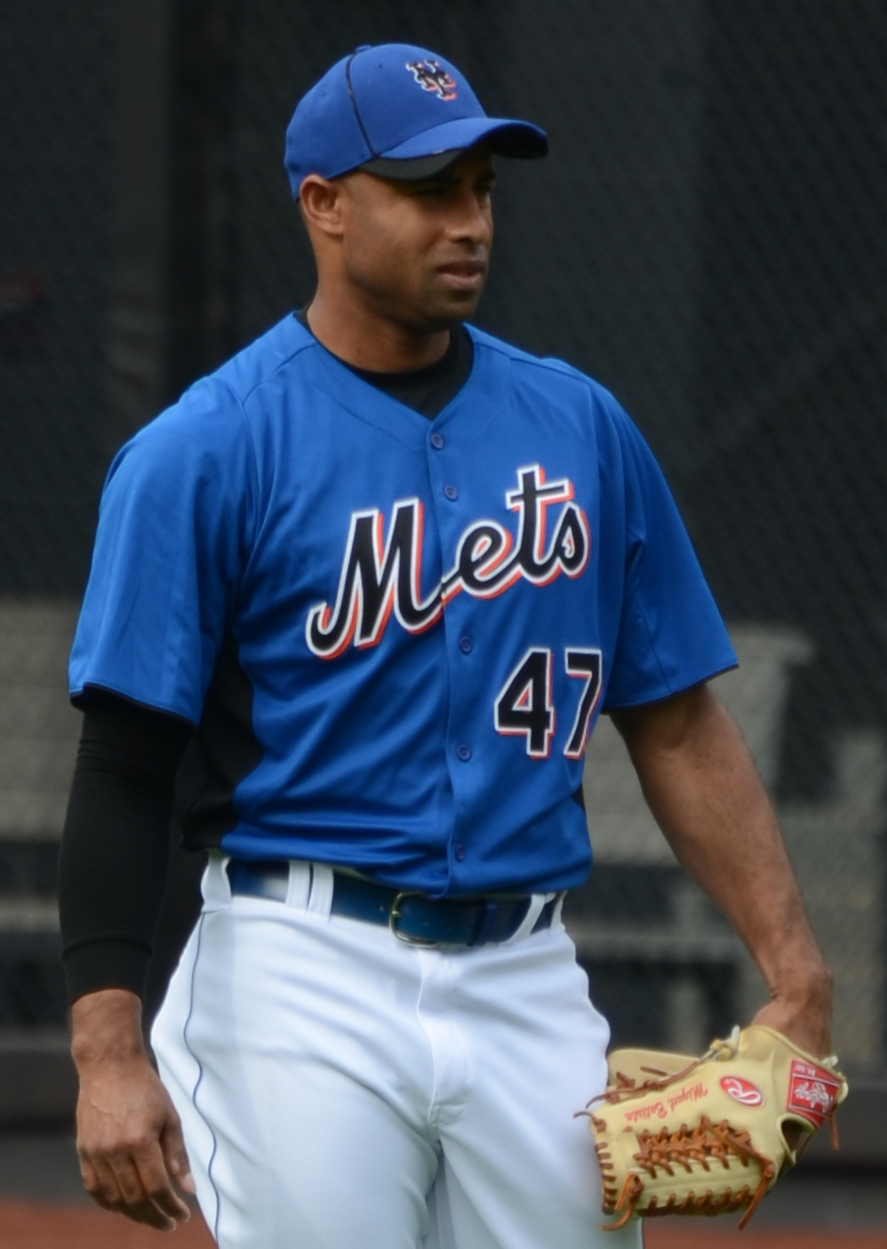
Batista with the Mets in 2011

=== New York Mets ===
Batista signed a minor league contract with the New York Mets on July 4, 2011. On August 28, 2011, the Mets selected his contract from Buffalo. He made his first start with the Mets on September 1, 2011, and won his 100th career game. On September 28, 2011, the Mets' final game of the season, Batista started against the Cincinnati Reds and pitched a two-hit, complete-game shutout.

On January 10, 2012, Batista resigned with the Mets to a minor league deal. He was later added to the 40-man roster. After posting a 1–3 record with a 4.82 ERA, Batista was designated for assignment on July 22. He was released on July 26.

=== Atlanta Braves and later career ===
On July 27, 2012, Batista signed a contract with the Atlanta Braves. On January 19, 2013, Batista signed a minor league contract with the Colorado Rockies. He was released on March 25.

On April 9, 2013, Batista signed a minor league contract with the Toronto Blue Jays and was assigned to the Triple-A Buffalo Bisons. He was released by the Blue Jays on May 21.

== International career ==
Batista pitched for the Dominican Republic in the 2006 World Baseball Classic. He allowed 4 runs, including 2 home runs, in 3 1/3 innings.

== Personal life ==
Batista has written a book of poetry in Spanish titled Sentimientos en Blanco y Negro (transl. Feelings in Black and White). He has also published Ante los ojos de la ley (transl. Through the Eyes of the Law), a thriller about a serial killer. His novel was published in English as The Avenger of Blood: A Plot Where Real Facts and Evidences Face Faith.

Batista played the Native American flute on a 2004 Radmilla Cody album.

Batista donated 11,000 books to the a Navajo Nation library in 2003. He also donated $50,000 to build a baseball diamond in Sacaton, Arizona, the first on the tribe's land.

Batista has supported childhood literacy and education efforts in Seattle while with the Mariners and in the Dominican Republic after he retired.
