= Kevin Frederick =

American baseball player (born 1976)

- Relief pitcher
- Born: November 4, 1976 (age 49); Evanston, Illinois, U.S.
- Batted: Left Threw: Right

MLB debut
- July 15, 2002, for the Minnesota Twins

Last MLB appearance
- September 17, 2004, for the Toronto Blue Jays

MLB statistics
- Win–loss record: 0–2
- Earned run average: 7.59
- Strikeouts: 27
- Stats at Baseball Reference

Teams
- Minnesota Twins (2002); Toronto Blue Jays (2004)

Kevin Frederick (born November 4, 1976) is an American actor, producer, and baseball player. In nine seasons, Frederick was primarily a relief pitcher.

== Career ==
Frederick attended high school at Stevenson High School in Lincolnshire, Illinois. After graduating from Creighton University, where he was a two-time Missouri Valley Conference all-star, Frederick was drafted in 1997 in the 17th round of the amateur entry draft by the Minnesota Twins, but failed to reach a contract agreement with the team.

In the 1998 amateur entry draft, Frederick was again selected by the Twins. He signed with the team, and played four and a half seasons in the minor leagues before being called up in July 2002. He made his major league debut on July 15 in a win against the Los Angeles Angels, in which he gave up one run over an inning and two thirds. Frederick only pitched in eight games for the Twins that season. Before the 2003 season, Frederick was picked up off waivers by the Toronto Blue Jays. Frederick pitched most of two seasons in the minor leagues, and was granted free agency after the 2004 season. He was signed in the middle of the 2005 season by the Boston Red Sox. He played two seasons in the Red Sox farm system, and retired after the 2006 season, only twenty-nine years old. Kevin has recently expressed his hobby for video games and hopes one day he can go pro in Counter-Strike.
