= Eric Crozier (baseball) =

American baseball player (born 1978)

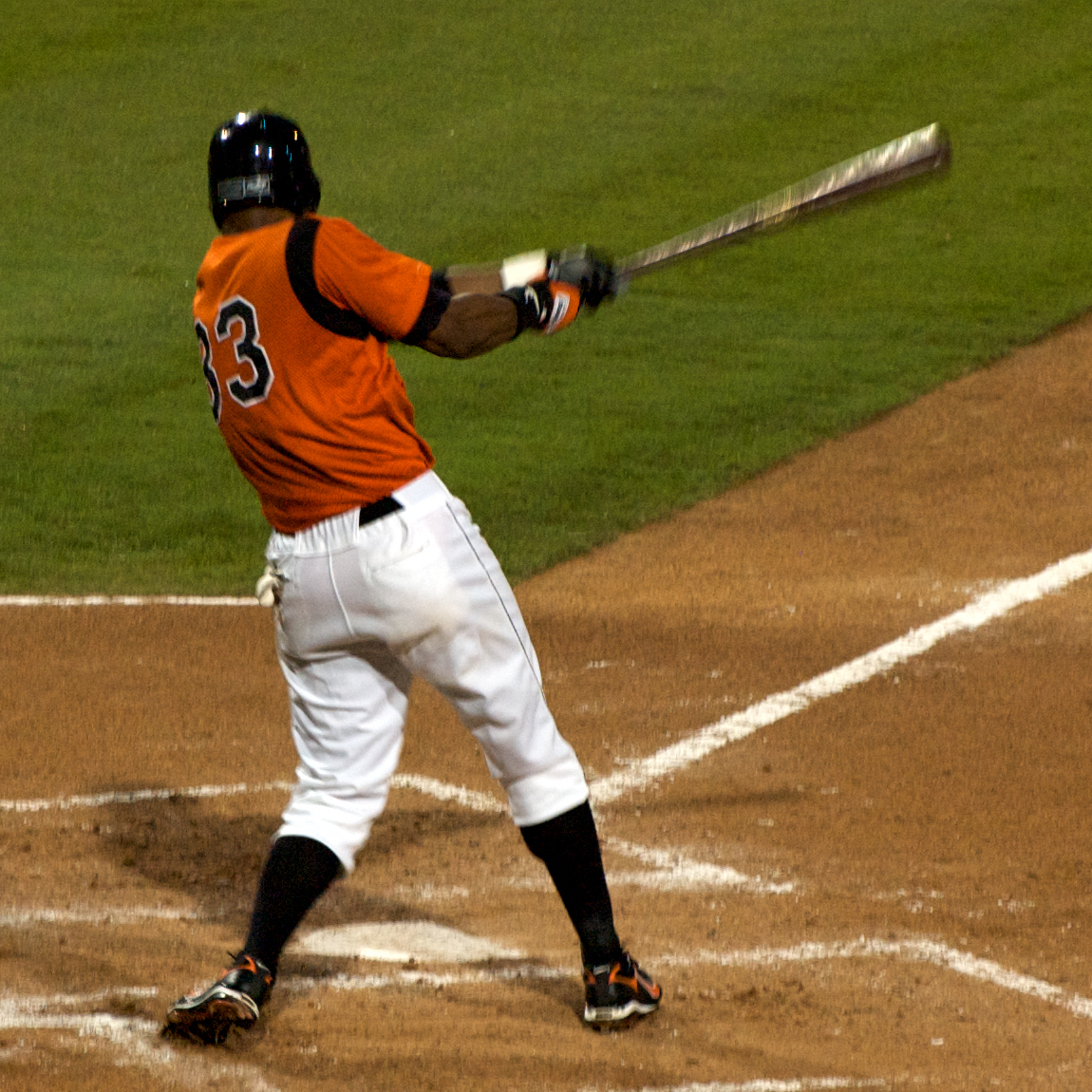
- Crozier batting for the Bowie Baysox, Double-A affiliates of the Baltimore Orioles, in 2009.
- Outfielder
- Born: August 11, 1978 (age 47); Columbus, Ohio, U.S.
- Batted: Left Threw: Left

MLB debut
- September 4, 2004, for the Toronto Blue Jays

Last MLB appearance
- October 2, 2004, for the Toronto Blue Jays

MLB statistics
- Batting average: .152
- Home runs: 2
- Runs batted in: 4
- Stats at Baseball Reference

Teams
- Toronto Blue Jays (2004)

Eric Le Roi Crozier (born August 11, 1978) is an American former Major League Baseball (MLB) first baseman and outfielder. Crozier played for the Toronto Blue Jays in 2004. For his entire minor league career, Crozier has logged 911 games, accumulating 115 home runs and 458 RBI, while batting .262.

== Career ==
Crozier attended Independence High School and Norfolk State University. Crozier was drafted by the Cleveland Indians in the 41st round of the 2000 Major League Baseball draft. On August 4, 2004, he was traded to the Toronto Blue Jays for Josh Phelps and made his Major League debut on September 4, 2004. In 2005, Crozier played in the Blue Jays', Yankees', and Reds' organizations. In 2006, he played for the Reds' Double-A affiliate, the Chattanooga Lookouts before being released on May 22. He signed with the Lancaster Barnstormers of the Atlantic League. He started 2007 playing for Boston's Double-A affiliate, the Portland Sea Dogs, but was released during the season and signed with the Barnstormers again. In 2008, he was left unprotected in the expansion draft and was taken by the Southern Maryland Blue Crabs.

He was purchased by the Baltimore Orioles on Friday, June 19, 2009, and spent the season with the Double-A Bowie Baysox. He last played for the Southern Maryland Blue Crabs of the independent Atlantic League in 2010.
