= Josh Phelps =

American baseball player (born 1978)

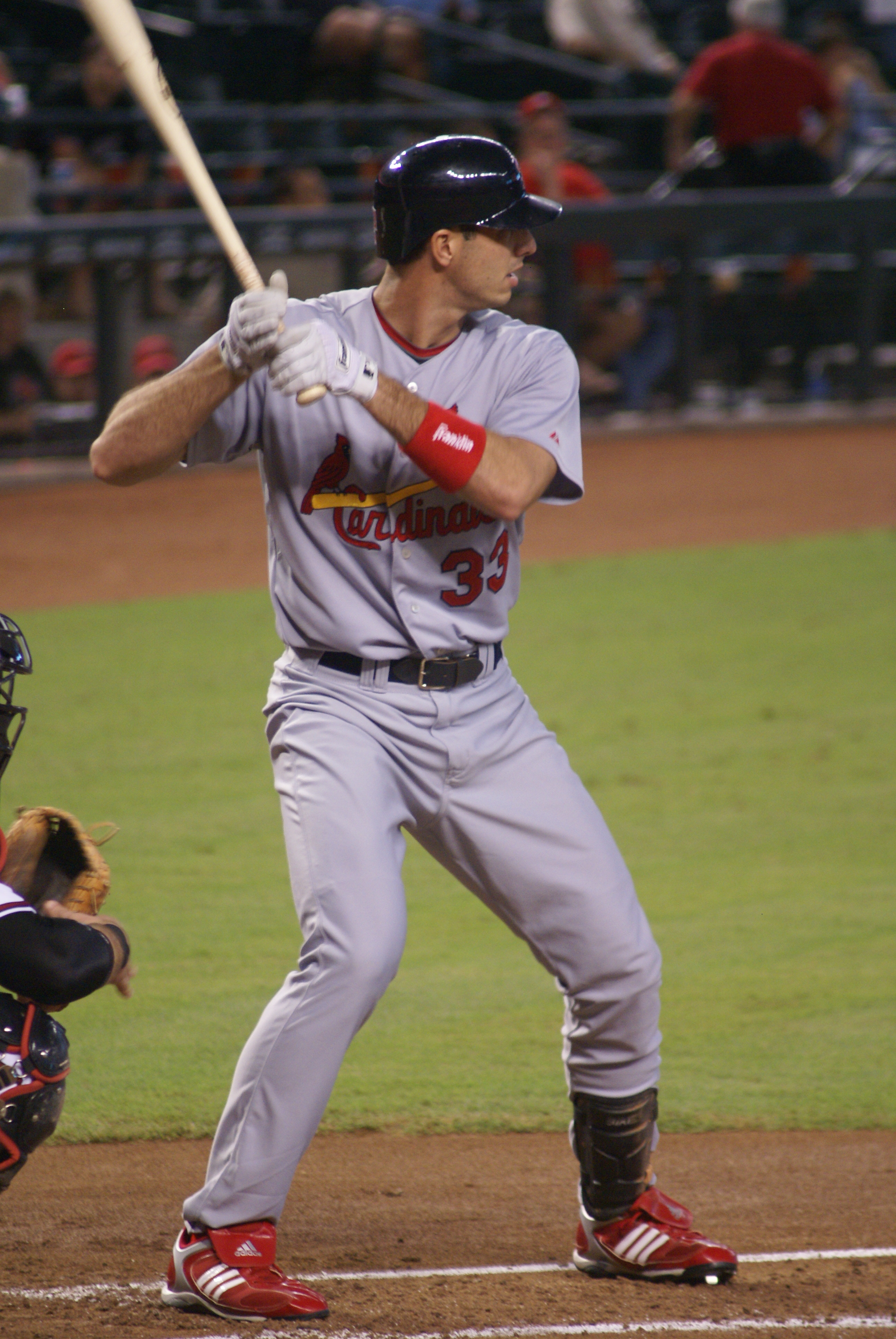
- Phelps with the St. Louis Cardinals
- Designated hitter / First baseman
- Born: May 12, 1978 (age 47); Anchorage, Alaska, U.S.
- Batted: Right Threw: Right

MLB debut
- June 13, 2000, for the Toronto Blue Jays

Last MLB appearance
- September 28, 2008, for the St. Louis Cardinals

MLB statistics
- Batting average: .273
- Home runs: 64
- Runs batted in: 244
- Stats at Baseball Reference

Teams
- Toronto Blue Jays (2000–2004); Cleveland Indians (2004); Tampa Bay Devil Rays (2005); New York Yankees (2007); Pittsburgh Pirates (2007); St. Louis Cardinals (2008)

Joshua Lee Phelps (born May 12, 1978) is an American former professional baseball first baseman. He played in Major League Baseball (MLB) for the Toronto Blue Jays, Cleveland Indians, Tampa Bay Devil Rays, New York Yankees, Pittsburgh Pirates, and St. Louis Cardinals. Phelps was also a member of the independent Bridgeport Bluefish, as well as the Telemarket Rimini of the Italian Baseball League.

== Career ==
=== High school years ===
Phelps attended Lakeland High School in Rathdrum, Idaho, where he was the baseball team's Most Valuable Player as a senior, and graduated 4th in his class in 1996 with a 3.94 GPA.

Phelps was drafted by the Toronto Blue Jays as a catcher in the 10th round of the 1996 draft. Phelps had originally planned to take a degree in engineering.

=== Minor league career ===
In 1999, he led the Florida State League in slugging percentage (.562), and was 2nd in batting (.328). He was rated as the 5th best prospect in the organization by Baseball America.

In 2001, with Tennessee of the Southern League (Double-A), he hit .292, led the league with 36 doubles and 31 home runs, and was third in RBI (97). He was the Southern League MVP, was named to their All-Star team as the catcher and designated hitter, was selected to Baseball America's Minor League Second Team All-Star as catcher, was named as the R. Howard Webster Award winner (team MVP), and was twice selected as the SL Player of the Week.

He then hit .433 in 23 games in the Arizona Fall League for Scottsdale. He was rated the top prospect in the Blue Jays organization by Baseball America.

In 2002, he started the season with Syracuse (Triple-A) of the International League, and was recalled on July 2 by Toronto. At the time of his recall, he was leading all of minor league baseball in home runs (24), and was leading the IL in RBI (64) and slugging percentage (.658).

He was named to the Triple-A All Star team, and was selected to play for Team USA at the Futures game in Milwaukee.

He spent 2006 with the Toledo Mud Hens, the Detroit Tigers Triple-A franchise. He hit .308 (2nd in the league), and ranked second among International League hitters with a .532 slugging percentage, and 3rd in the league with 24 HR and 90 RBI.

Through 2006 in his minor league career, he had hit .288/.360/.524.

=== Major league career ===
In 2000, he appeared in one game for Toronto at the age of 22. The following year, he caught in 7 games, and went hitless in 12 at bats. In 2002, he hit .309 with a .562 slugging percentage, and was 5th in the AL in HBP (17). In 2003, he hit a career-high 20 home runs. In August 2004, he was traded by the Blue Jays to the Cleveland Indians for Eric Crozier.

In December 2004, he signed as a free agent with the Tampa Bay Devil Rays. In January 2006, he was signed by the Detroit Tigers to a minor league contract. In November 2006, he signed with the Baltimore Orioles to a one-year minor league contract, but he was acquired by the Yankees in the Rule 5 Draft on December 7, 2006. On March 30, 2007, he was placed on the New York Yankee 40-man roster, beating out Andy Phillips. Initially picked to platoon at first base with Doug Mientkiewicz, manager Joe Torre hinted that Phelps might man the position by himself if his impressive spring training numbers continued into the regular season. On June 19, 2007, Phelps was designated for assignment. He was claimed by the Pittsburgh Pirates on June 22 and replaced Brad Eldred on their 25-man roster.

On November 29, 2007, he elected to file for free agency and was signed to a minor league contract by the St. Louis Cardinals on January 10, 2008. Phelps was promoted to the Major League roster on August 27, 2008. He appeared in 19 games in 2008, and he made his last Major League appearance on September 28, 2008, in the last game of the Cardinals' season.

On October 15, 2008, he was designated for assignment to make room for left-handed relief specialist, Charlie Manning.

On November 3, 2008, the San Francisco Giants signed Josh Phelps to a minor league contract with a spring training invitation.

Phelps is the all-time leader in home runs for a player born in Alaska.

=== Independent League career ===
2010 was his first season with the Bridgeport Bluefish in the Atlantic League. He was the starting first baseman and wore number 29 as of June 30, 2010. In 100 games he hit .310/.375/.449 with 10 home runs, 67 RBIs and 15 stolen bases.

=== Italian Baseball League career ===
On February 21, 2011, the Telemarket Rimini signed Josh Phelps to one-year contract. In 40 games he hit .340/.444/.486 with 4 home runs, 29 RBIs and 5 stolen bases.

== Awards ==
- 1999 – Florida State League All-Star DH
- 2001 – Baseball America 2nd team Minor League All-Star C
- 2001 – Southern League All-Star C
- 2001 – Southern League Most Valuable Player
- 2001 – Double A All-Star C
- 2001 – Toronto Blue Jays Minor League Player of the Year
- 2002 – Baseball America 2nd team Minor League All-Star C
- 2002 – Triple A All-Star DH
- 2002 – Toronto Blue Jays Minor League Player of the Year
- 2002 – AL Rookie of the Year (Voting Rank: # 6)

== See also ==
- Rule 5 draft results
