= Matt Riley =

American baseball player (born 1979)

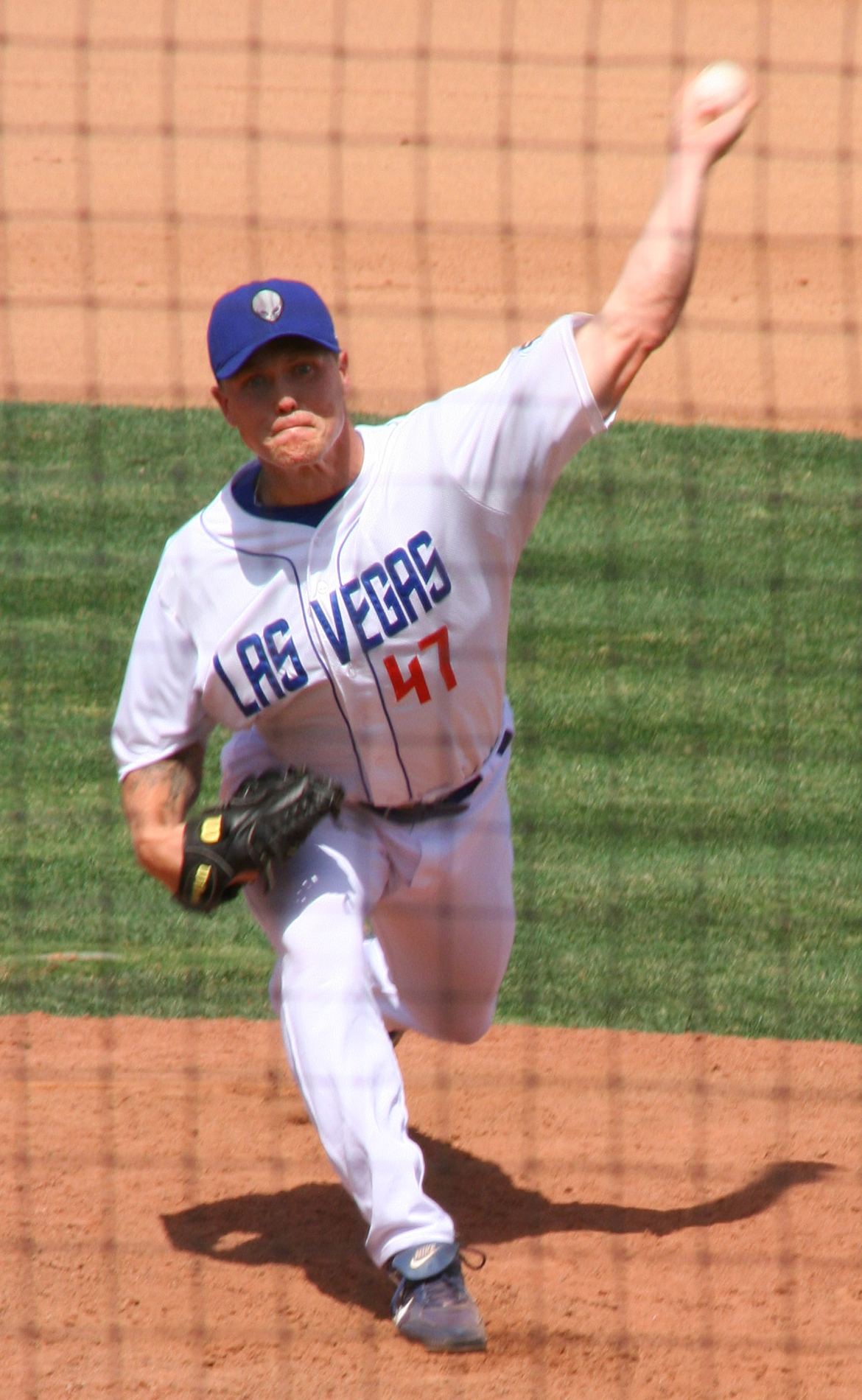
- Riley pitching for the Las Vegas 51s in 2008.
- Relief pitcher
- Born: August 2, 1979 (age 46); Antioch, California, U.S.
- Batted: Left Threw: Left

MLB debut
- September 9, 1999, for the Baltimore Orioles

Last MLB appearance
- May 4, 2005, for the Texas Rangers

MLB statistics
- Win–loss record: 5–4
- Earned run average: 5.99
- Strikeouts: 78
- Stats at Baseball Reference

Teams
- Baltimore Orioles (1999, 2003–2004); Texas Rangers (2005)

Matthew Paul Riley (born August 2, 1979) is an American former professional baseball pitcher. He played in Major League Baseball (MLB) for the Baltimore Orioles and Texas Rangers.

== Baseball career ==
He attended Sacramento City College. Riley was drafted by the Baltimore Orioles in the third round of the 1997 draft. He dominated for the Delmarva Shorebirds of the South Atlantic League at age 18, having an earned run average of 1.19 and 136 strikeouts in 83 innings pitched. It was there that his curveball started becoming known as one of the best in the Orioles' organization at the time. He had similar success with the Frederick Keys of the Carolina League and the Bowie Baysox of the Double-A Eastern League in 1999. He earned a callup to the Orioles in 1999, and though his ERA in three starts there was 7.36, he was still highly regarded by the Orioles due to his minor-league achievements that year. Baseball America listed him as the Orioles' top prospect in both 1999 and 2000. However, in 2000, he made only two starts for the Rochester Red Wings (then the Orioles' Triple-A affiliate), giving up 11 earned runs in 7 innings. He spent the rest of that season and the 2001 season recovering from his first Tommy John surgery.

He returned to playing in 2002, but with little success. He went 4-10 at Bowie, with an ERA of 6.34. He showed signs of improvement in 2003, going a combined 9-4 for Bowie and the Orioles' new Triple-A team in Ottawa and earning another callup to the major leagues, where he earned his first career win and had a 1.80 ERA in two starts. The 2004 season was the first season that he began in the majors, but he struggled there. In 14 appearances (13 starts), he logged a 3-4 record and a 5.62 ERA, and he was also sent back to Ottawa for ten starts.

Finally, in 2005, the Orioles traded him to the Texas Rangers during spring training for Ramon Nivar. He was able to play briefly in the major leagues for Texas, but as a one-out middle reliever rather than a starter. He accumulated an ERA of 9.95 over seven games and was then sent down to the Triple-A Oklahoma RedHawks. In July 2005, he had his second Tommy John surgery and missed the rest of the 2005 season. While attempting to come back from that surgery, he retore his ulnar collateral ligament and had to have a third Tommy John surgery on his left elbow.

In 2007, Riley played for the Las Vegas 51s and Jacksonville Suns in the Los Angeles Dodgers minor league system. Riley was released by the Dodgers on July 24, 2008.

After not playing baseball in 2009, Riley played for two independent league teams in 2010 — the Orange County Flyers and the York Revolution. He then retired from the game.

== Personal life ==
Matt married Tiffany Hayward on January 14, 2006. They have 2 daughters together and reside in Tennessee.
