= Frank Menechino =

American baseball player and coach (born 1971)

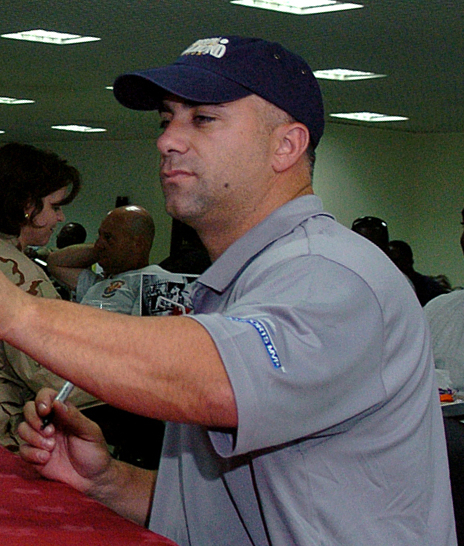
- Menechino at As Sayliyah Army Base in 2007
- Second baseman
- Born: January 7, 1971 (age 55); Staten Island, New York, U.S.
- Batted: Right Threw: Right

MLB debut
- September 6, 1999, for the Oakland Athletics

Last MLB appearance
- October 2, 2005, for the Toronto Blue Jays

MLB statistics
- Batting average: .240
- Home runs: 36
- Runs batted in: 149
- Stats at Baseball Reference

Teams
- As player: Oakland Athletics (1999–2004); Toronto Blue Jays (2004–2005); As coach: Miami Marlins (2014–2018); Chicago White Sox (2020–2022)

Frank Menechino (born January 7, 1971) is an American former professional baseball infielder and most recently the hitting coach for the Chicago White Sox of Major League Baseball (MLB). He played in MLB for the Oakland Athletics and Toronto Blue Jays from 1999 through 2005.

== Playing career ==
Menechino played baseball at Susan E. Wagner High School in New York. He played college baseball at Gulf Coast Community College in Panama City, Florida before transferring to the University of Alabama.

Drafted by the Chicago White Sox in the 45th round of the 1993 draft, Menechino played five years for their minor league teams. Notably, he was one of the players who crossed the picket lines to be a replacement player during spring training in 1995 during the players' strike. Due to this, he was ineligible to join the MLBPA.

He played for the Oakland Athletics and Toronto Blue Jays of the American League. He played second base, shortstop, third base, designated hitter, and also made two pitching appearances. When he pitched for the A's in 2000, it was the last time the A's had a position player pitch until first baseman Ike Davis in 2015. His best year came in 2001 with the Oakland Athletics, when he set career highs with 12 home runs, 60 RBI and 139 games played.

In early 2006, Menechino signed a minor league contract with the Cincinnati Reds, but did not make the major league team out of spring training. On August 17, Menechino signed a minor league contract with the New York Yankees and was sent to the Triple-A Columbus Clippers, where he was a utility man. On February 10, 2007, Menechino signed a minor league contract with the Colorado Rockies. The Rockies released him June 1, 2007, followed by his contract being picked up by the San Diego Padres and being assigned to the Triple-A Portland Beavers on June 9, 2007. He became a free agent at the end of the season.

He played in Italy for Danesi Nettuno for two months in 2008, before retiring after hurting his back.

== Coaching career ==
On December 22, 2008, Menechino was hired to become the new hitting coach for the New York Yankees' Double-A affiliate, the Trenton Thunder. Menechino coached for the Triple-A Scranton/Wilkes-Barre Yankees in 2011.

Menechino was hired by the Miami Marlins as their hitting coach on October 11, 2013. The Marlins fired him after the 2018 season.

The Chicago White Sox hired Menechino to be the hitting coach of their Triple-A Affiliate, the Charlotte Knights, for the 2019 season. Following the 2019 season, he was promoted to the position of hitting coach for the White Sox. Following the 2022 season, Menechino was fired.

== See also ==
- Staten Island Sports Hall of Fame
- List of people from Staten Island § Baseball
