= Josh Towers =

American baseball player (born 1977)

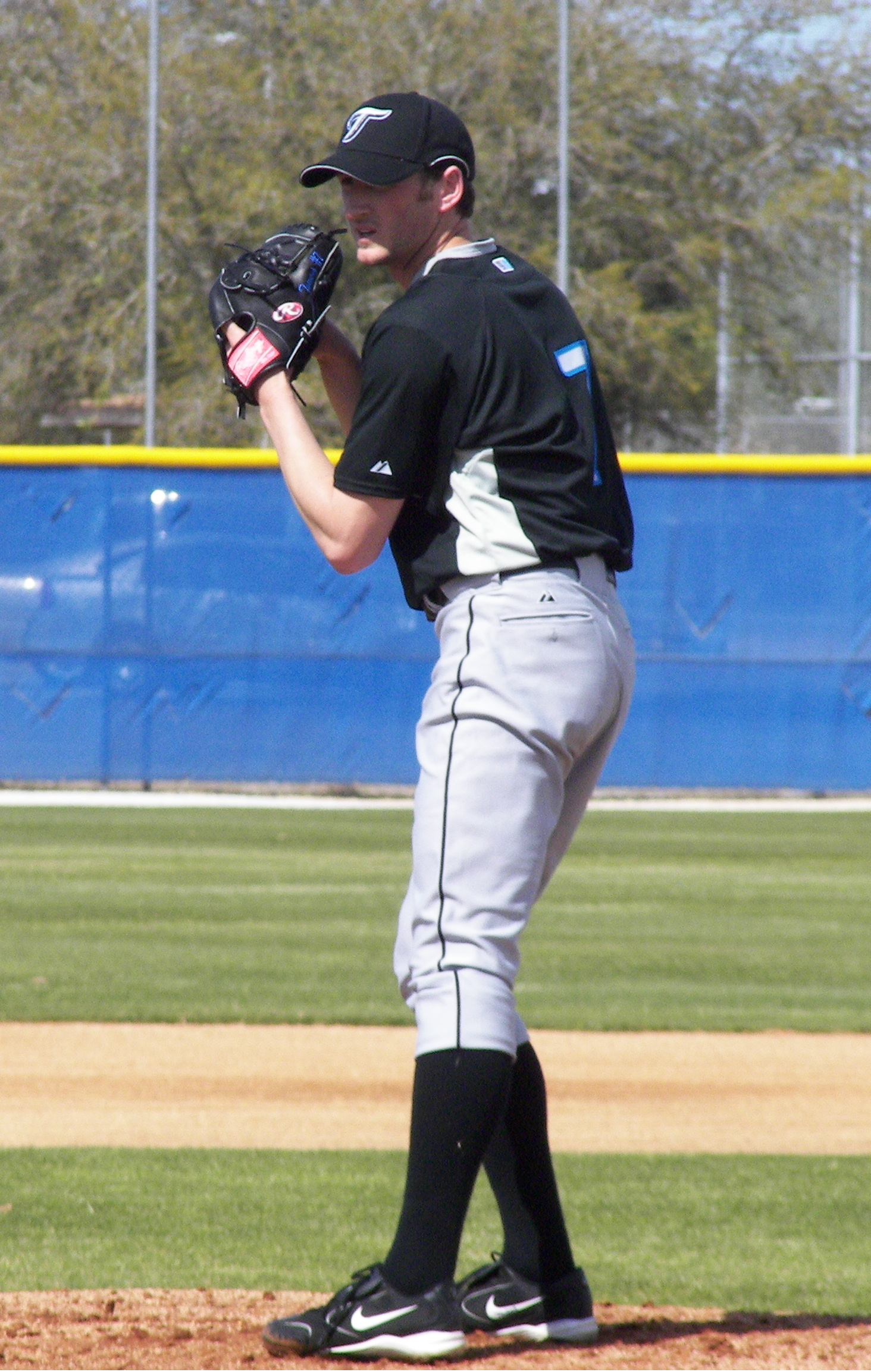
- Towers with the Blue Jays in 2007
- Pitcher
- Born: February 26, 1977 (age 49); Port Hueneme, California, U.S.
- Batted: Right Threw: Right

MLB debut
- May 2, 2001, for the Baltimore Orioles

Last MLB appearance
- September 12, 2009, for the New York Yankees

MLB statistics
- Win–loss record: 45–55
- Earned run average: 4.95
- Strikeouts: 389
- Stats at Baseball Reference

Teams
- Baltimore Orioles (2001–2002); Toronto Blue Jays (2003–2007); New York Yankees (2009)

Joshua Eric Towers (born February 26, 1977) is an American former right-handed professional baseball pitcher. Towers stands at 6 feet 1 inch (1.85 m) tall, and weighs 188 pounds (85 kg).

== Professional career ==
=== Baltimore Orioles ===
Towers was drafted by the Baltimore Orioles in the 15th round of the 1996 Major League Baseball draft. Towers made his major league debut on May 2, 2001, pitching out of the bullpen. After moving to the rotation, he threw a complete game shutout on June 8. Overall, he compiled an 8-10 record with a 4.49 ERA in 140.1 innings. His season ended prematurely when he broke his finger after punching a bullpen phone in Toronto's SkyDome.

Towers started the 2002 with three straight losses, allowing 12 earned runs on 23 hits in 19.1 innings. He was then moved to the bullpen, where he continued to struggle. He was optioned to the minors after allowing 10 runs in five innings against the Red Sox on May 1. He spent the rest of the season pitching in Triple-A Rochester, finishing with a 7.57 ERA in 69 innings. Towers became a minor league free agent at the end of the season.

=== Toronto Blue Jays ===
Towers signed with the Blue Jays as a minor league free agent for the 2003 season. Joining the team midway through the season, he would go on to have a very successful run, appearing in 14 games (eight starts). He finished the year 8–1 with a 4.48 ERA. Unusually, while with the Blue Jays Towers was assigned the uniform number 7. This made him the only pitcher in the major leagues with a single-digit uniform number at that time, and also the first pitcher in Blue Jays history with a single digit number. Though several dozen pitchers had previously worn a single digit uniform number for a span of several games, Towers was the first to wear it regularly over the course of several seasons since pitcher Ben Chapman (a converted outfielder) wore number 5 for the Brooklyn Dodgers in 1944-45.

In 2004, Towers became the Blue Jays' fifth starter. He went 9–9 with a 5.11 ERA in 21 starts that season. Towers missed time in September with a sore shoulder.

Towers was once again in the Blue Jays rotation to start the 2005 season. After ace Roy Halladay's leg was broken by a line drive on July 8, Towers was arguably Toronto's most dependable pitcher. He finished the season with a club-leading 13 wins (tied with rookie Gustavo Chacín), and set career bests with a 3.71 ERA, 33 games started, and 208.2 innings pitched. In November, Towers signed a two-year, $5.2 million contract with the Blue Jays.

The Blue Jays, hoping to compete in the AL East, struggled in 2006. Towers had a 1–8 and 9.00 ERA after 10 starts, and was demoted to Triple-A Syracuse on May 25 "to clear his head," according to manager John Gibbons. Towers only pitched in five games at the major league level for the rest of the season. He was recalled on June 20, but his struggles continued, and he was outrighted to Triple-A on June 27. He finished the season with a 2–10 record and 8.42 ERA in 15 appearances.

Following his poor 2006 season, Towers decided to train with teammate and fellow Las Vegas off-season resident Reed Johnson. He also developed a new in-season workout regimen. Towers competed with John Thomson, Tomo Ohka, and Víctor Zambrano for one of two open spots in the Blue Jays rotation. During spring training, Towers was dominant, with only one bad outing during the spring. On March 31, it was announced that Towers had won the final spot in the 2007 rotation to begin the season. Blue Jays General Manager J. P. Ricciardi admitted that Towers would be "on a short leash".

After allowing 12 earned runs on 27 hits in his first four starts, Towers was demoted to the bullpen and Víctor Zambrano was promoted in his place. Despite his continued struggles in the bullpen, he moved back into the rotation on June 11 to replace the injured Tomo Ohka. On July 8, Josh Towers pitched eight shutout innings, taking a perfect game into the sixth inning. During a game against the New York Yankees on August 7, Towers intentionally hit Alex Rodriguez with a pitch. Rodriguez approached the mound and the benches cleared. After Rodriguez took first, Towers heard Yankees first base coach Tony Peña "chirping" at him, which led to the benches clearing again. After the game, Towers called Pena a "quitter," referring to his resignation as the Kansas City Royals' manager in 2005, and said he is not in a position to run his mouth. Towers promptly surrendered two runs after the incident and lost the game. He was then moved to the bullpen for the rest of the season once again when A.J. Burnett was activated from the disabled list. The Blue Jays declined to offer Towers a contract in the offseason, making him a free agent.

=== Colorado Rockies ===
On January 4, 2008, Towers signed a one-year contract with the Colorado Rockies. The deal also included a mutual option for 2009. He spent four months with the Rockies' Triple-A affiliate, the Colorado Springs Sky Sox. After compiling a 6.27 ERA between the rotation and bullpen, Towers was released by the Rockies.

=== Washington Nationals ===
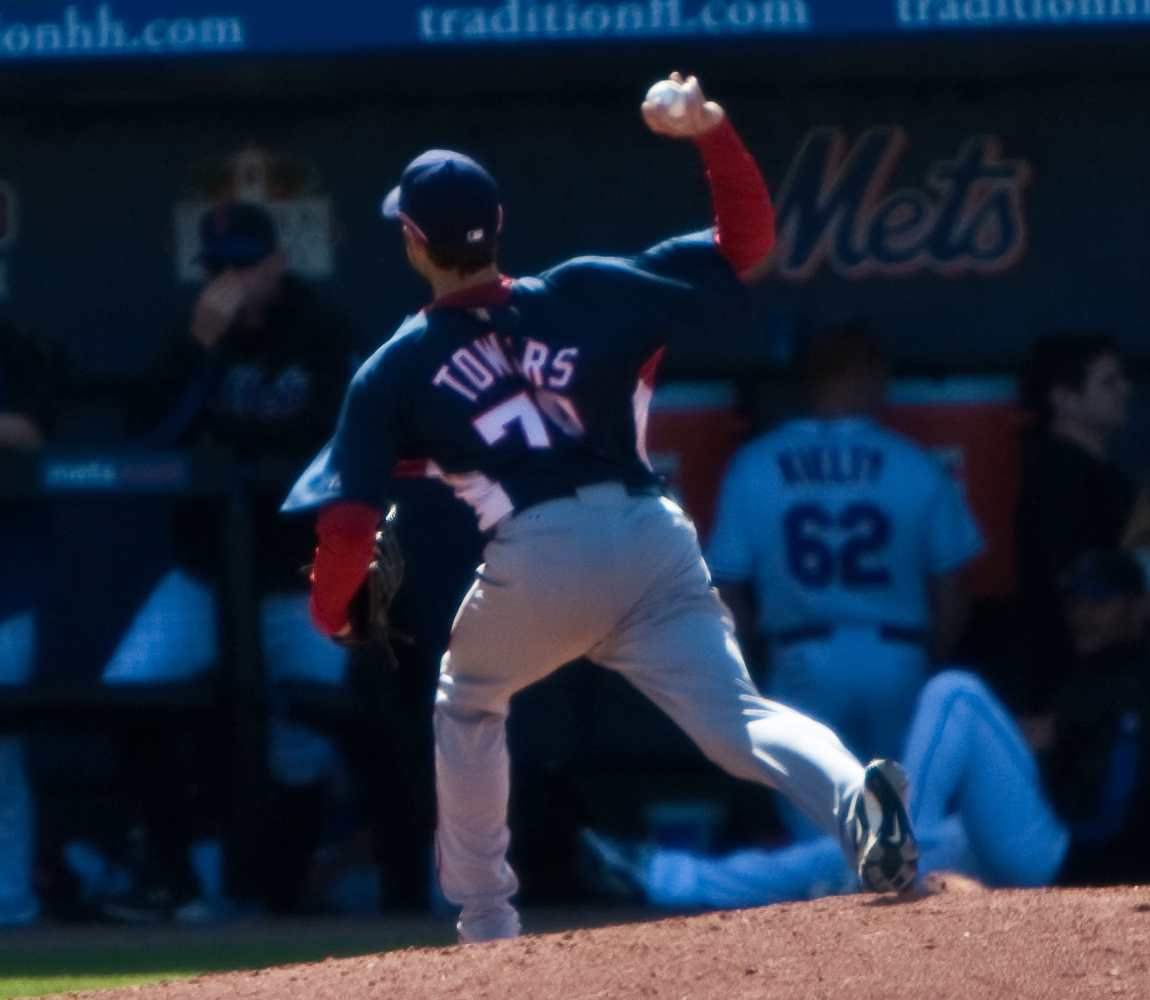
Towers as a non-roster invitee of the Washington Nationals in 2009 spring training

After becoming a free agent, Towers signed a minor league contract with the Washington Nationals in January 2009. He pitched in just one game for the Syracuse Chiefs due to injury and was released on May 5.

=== New York Yankees ===
On May 10, 2009, he was signed to a minor league contract by the New York Yankees and sent to the Scranton/Wilkes-Barre Yankees. On August 8, 2009, he was called up and placed on the Yankees roster but was designated for assignment the following day to make room for newly acquired pitcher Chad Gaudin. Towers cleared waivers and was outrighted back to the Scranton/Wilkes-Barre Yankees. On September 5, he was recalled to the Yankees. He earned a World Series ring for his two appearances with the club that season.

=== Los Angeles Dodgers ===
On December 11, 2009, Towers signed a minor league contract with the Los Angeles Dodgers. He competed for a spot in the rotation during spring training, but was ultimately assigned to the Triple-A Albuquerque Isotopes to start the season. He made eight starts for the Isotopes and was 2-5 with an 8.05 ERA. On May 20, he triggered his opt out clause and was granted his release from the organization.

=== Guerreros de Oaxaca ===
He signed with Guerreros de Oaxaca in the Mexican Baseball League for 2011 and pitched to a 7.94 ERA in four games.

=== Camden Riversharks ===
After his release in Mexico he signed with the Independent Camden Riversharks. With Camden, he posted a record of 5-6, with a 6.15 ERA. On August 7, 2011, Towers announced his retirement from baseball.

Since his retirement, Towers has served as the color commentator for the University of Nevada, Las Vegas Rebels baseball team. He is also a baseball analyst for Vegas Stats & Information Network.

== Coaching career ==
Beginning in 2026, Towers is the pitching coach for the Kelowna Falcons, a summer college baseball team in the West Coast League.
