= Adam Peterson (2000s pitcher) =

American baseball player (born 1979)

- Pitcher
- Born: May 18, 1979 (age 46); Savannah, Georgia, U.S.
- Batted: Right Threw: Right

MLB debut
- June 24, 2004, for the Toronto Blue Jays

Last MLB appearance
- June 28, 2004, for the Toronto Blue Jays

MLB statistics
- Win–loss record: 0–0
- Earned run average: 16.88
- Strikeouts: 2
- Stats at Baseball Reference

Teams
- Toronto Blue Jays (2004)

Adam L. Peterson (born May 18, 1979) is an American former professional baseball pitcher who appeared in three Major League Baseball games for the Toronto Blue Jays in June 2004.

The Blue Jays drafted Peterson out of Wichita State in the fourth round of the 2002 MLB draft. Peterson had been drafted three previous times in later rounds, by the Philadelphia Phillies in 1998, Kansas City Royals in 2000, and New York Yankees in 2001.

At Wichita State, Peterson started 26 of 30 games and was 14–4 with a 3.95 ERA. He was named to the 2000 All-Missouri Valley Conference Tournament team. That summer, he pitched for the Anchorage Glacier Pilots in the Alaska Baseball League.

Peterson pitched in three Blue Jays games in June 2004, all losses. He had one shutout appearance, walking two and striking out the only two batters of his brief major league career against the Montreal Expos on June 27. In his other two appearances, he allowed 5 earned runs while getting 5 outs, including a three-run home run to Carl Crawford in his debut on June 24.

Peterson was called a "fireballing reliever" in August 2004. That season he saved a career-high 15 games for the Double-A New Hampshire Fisher Cats.

The Blue Jays traded Peterson to the Arizona Diamondbacks on January 12, 2005 for infielder Shea Hillenbrand. The Diamondbacks placed Peterson on waivers that spring, and the Detroit Tigers claimed him on April 18. He pitched for the Double-A Erie SeaWolves in 2005, his last year in professional baseball.

== Personal life ==
Peterson's father served in the U.S. Army, so he grew up playing baseball in Panama and Colorado before attending Oconto Falls High School in Wisconsin. Peterson is married.
