= Gustavo Chacín =

Venezuelan baseball player (born 1980)

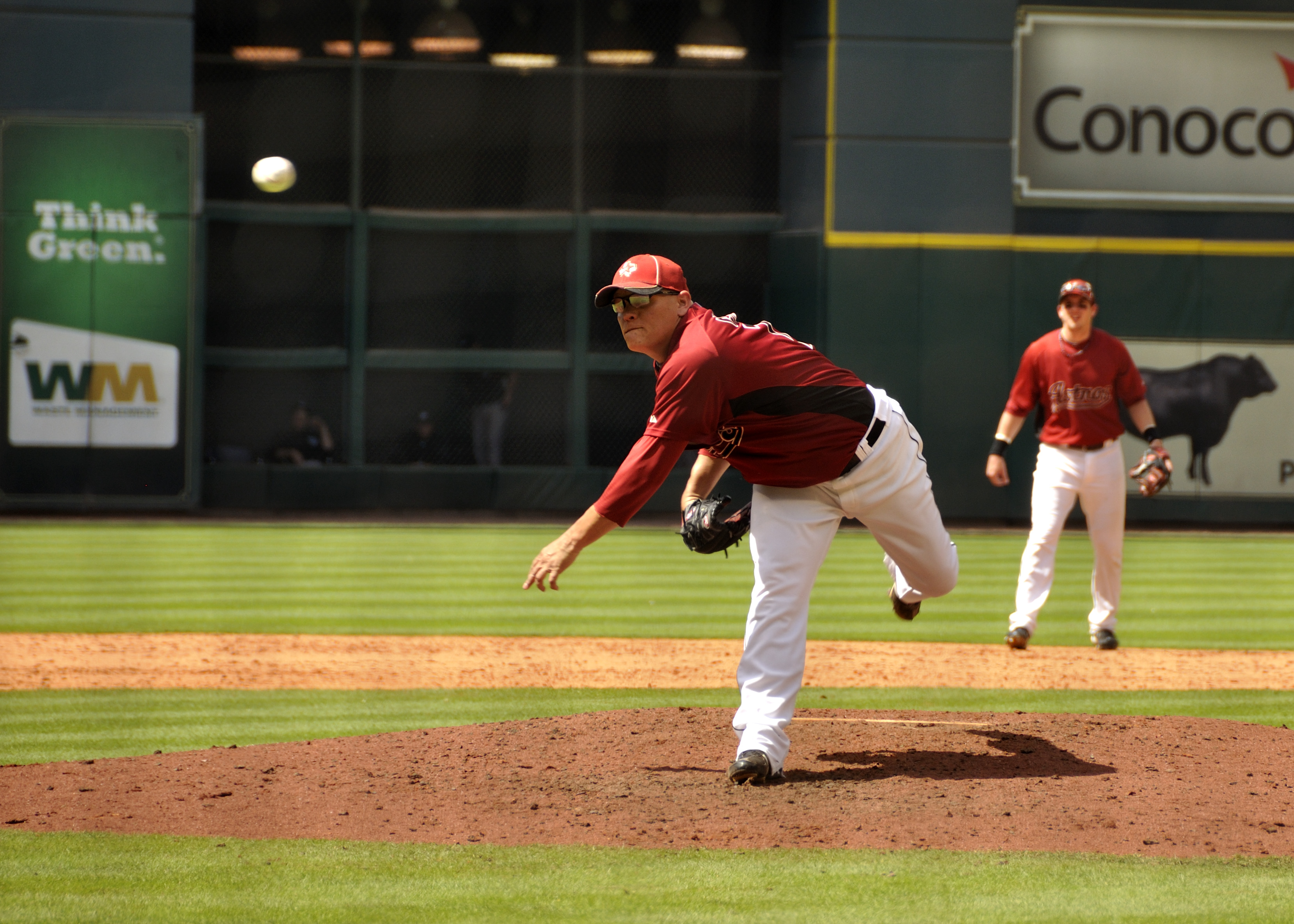
- Chacin with the Houston Astros
- Pitcher
- Born: December 4, 1980 (age 45); Maracaibo, Zulia State, Venezuela
- Batted: Left Threw: Left

MLB debut
- September 20, 2004, for the Toronto Blue Jays

Last MLB appearance
- September 30, 2010, for the Houston Astros

MLB statistics
- Win–loss record: 27–17
- Earned run average: 4.23
- Strikeouts: 216
- Stats at Baseball Reference

Teams
- Toronto Blue Jays (2004–2007); Houston Astros (2010)

Gustavo Adolfo Chacín (/tʃɑːˈsiːn/; born December 4, 1980) is a Venezuelan former professional baseball pitcher. He played in Major League Baseball (MLB) for the Toronto Blue Jays and Houston Astros.

== Career ==
=== Toronto Blue Jays ===
In 2004, Chacín led all minor leaguers with 18 wins, and was the 24th pitcher used by the Blue Jays, tying the team record set in the 2002 season.

Chacín began the 2004 campaign with the New Hampshire Fisher Cats of the Double–A Eastern League. He was 16–2 with 109 strikeouts and a 2.86 ERA in 141 2/3 innings, having earned his promotion to the Syracuse Chiefs of the Triple–A International League after a 34-innings scoreless streak. With the Chiefs, Chacín posted a 2–0 record with 14 strikeouts and a 2.31 ERA in 11 2/3 innings. Then, he was promoted to the major leagues for the first time and made his debut on September 20, 2004, against the New York Yankees at Yankee Stadium. Chacín allowed two earned runs on three hits over seven innings for the win, as Toronto beat the Yankees 6–3. In his second start, Chacín held the Baltimore Orioles to four hits and a run in seven innings, but took the loss. At the end of the season, he had compiled a 1–1 record with six strikeouts and a 2.57 ERA in 14 innings

At spring training in 2005, Chacín landed a spot in the Jays' starting rotation. He jumped out to a hot start, earning a record of 4–1 with 18 strikeouts and a 2.41 ERA over 32.2 innings through the month of April, and was selected the American League Rookie of the Month. In July, Chacín won five of his six starts, being named Rookie of the Month for the second time in the season. Chacín pitched and won the final game of the season for the Blue Jays against the Kansas City Royals with a solid line of 7 2/3 innings, 7 hits allowed, 1 run, 1 walk, 3 strikeouts in the 7–2 Blue Jay win. Chacín finished the season with a record of 13–9 and 3.72 ERA in 34 starts. He collected 121 strikeouts in 203 innings. He finished fifth in Rookie of the Year voting, netting two first place votes and fourteen total points, and was named to the Topps All-Star Rookie Team along with fellow Blue Jay Russ Adams.

Chacín finished his 2006 season 9–4 with a 5.05 ERA. He opened the 2007 season with Toronto, but was sent down to the minors by the end of April.

In 2008, Chacín spent the entire season with Toronto's Single–A affiliate Dunedin Blue Jays. He finished the 2008 campaign at Dunedin with a 1-7 won-loss record, and a 7.88 ERA, and was granted free agency by the Blue Jays at the conclusion of the season.

=== Philadelphia Phillies ===
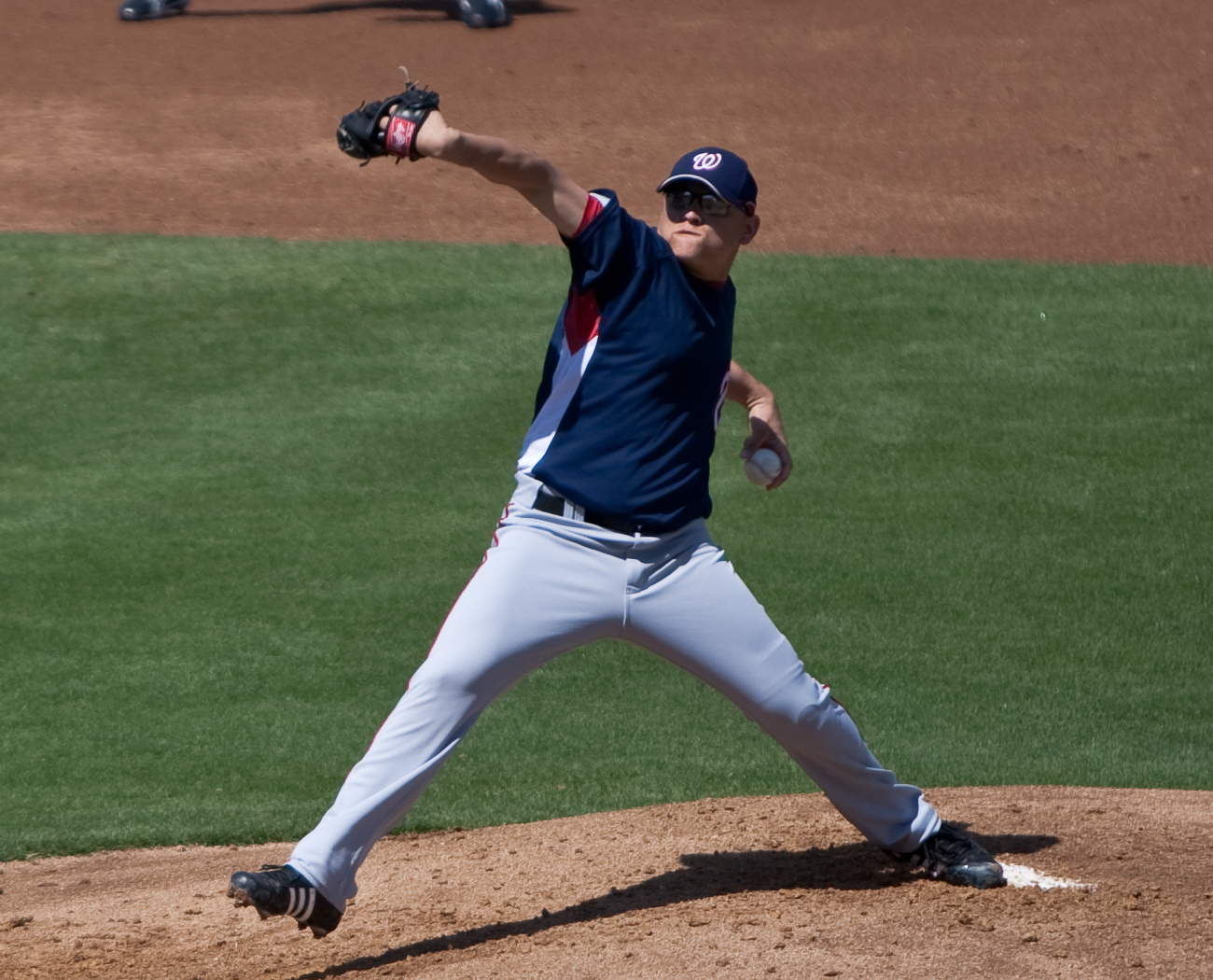
Chacín as a non-roster invitee of the Washington Nationals in 2009 spring training.

Chacín signed a minor league contract with the Washington Nationals on December 23, 2008, but was released by that club at the conclusion of spring training. Only a few days later, Chacín signed a minor league contract with the Philadelphia Phillies organization He split the 2009 season between the Lehigh Valley IronPigs, the Phillies' Triple–A affiliate, and the Double–A Reading Fightin Phils, compiling a cumulative 9–4 record and 3.20 ERA with 62 strikeouts across 106 2/3 innings pitched.

=== Houston Astros ===
Chacin was signed to a minor-league contract by the Houston Astros on December 14, 2009. He also received an invitation to spring training.

On May 3, 2010, the Astros purchased the contract of Chacin from the Triple–A Round Rock Express of the Pacific Coast League. Previously, Chacin had been exclusively a starter in the majors; with Houston, he was used exclusively as a relief pitcher.

Chacín had his only major-league hit in a game against the Washington Nationals on the May 31, 2010, a solo home run off Nationals starter Luis Atilano. It was Chacín's first major-league plate appearance in almost five years. It also proved to be the final at bat of his major-league career.

Chacin made 44 appearances for the Astros in 2010, all in relief. He went 2–2, with one save, and an ERA of 4.70. He did not make the 2011 club, however, and was sent down to the Triple-A Oklahoma City RedHawks. After going 3–6 with a 5.13 ERA, he was released by the Astros organization on July 14, 2011.

=== New York Mets ===
He signed a minor league contract with the New York Mets on July 16, 2011. The Mets assigned him to the Triple-A Buffalo Bisons. He went 0–1 with the Bisons, compiling a 12.00 ERA in 15 innings of work, and was granted free agency after the season ended.

== Personal life ==
Chacín cannot grow hair because of alopecia areata.

Gustavo Chacín and MLB pitcher Jhoulys Chacín are second cousins (once removed).

A joke on Toronto sports radio station Fan 590 that the name Chacín sounds like it should be the name of a cologne led the Blue Jays to do a "Chacín Cologne Night" on June 27, 2006.

Chacín was arrested on March 16, 2007, for driving under the influence in Tampa, Florida. He was stopped by Tampa Police at 3:43 a.m. ET and booked on the misdemeanor charge. Police reports indicated that Chacín's blood alcohol level measured .150, above the legal limit of .08. The pitcher was released on a $500 bond.

== See also ==
- List of Major League Baseball players from Venezuela
- List of Major League Baseball players with a home run in their final major league at bat
