= 2002 Toronto Blue Jays season =

2002 Toronto Blue Jays
- League: American League
- Division: East
- Ballpark: SkyDome
- City: Toronto
- Record: 78–84 (.481)
- Divisional place: 3rd
- Owners: Rogers Communications, Interbrew
- General managers: J. P. Ricciardi
- Managers: Buck Martinez, Carlos Tosca
- Television: CBC Television (Brian Williams, John Cerutti); The Sports Network (Rod Black, Pat Tabler); Rogers Sportsnet (Rob Faulds, John Cerutti)
- Radio: CHUM (AM) (Jerry Howarth, Tom Cheek)

The 2002 Toronto Blue Jays season was the franchise's 26th season of Major League Baseball. It resulted in the Blue Jays finishing third in the American League East with a record of 78 wins and 84 losses.

== Transactions ==
Transactions by the Toronto Blue Jays during the off-season before the 2002 season.

=== October 2001 ===
October 15	Jason Dickson granted free agency (signed with Tampa Bay Devil Rays to a contract on November 14, 2001). Aaron Holbert granted free agency (signed with Seattle Mariners to a contract on January 30, 2002). Izzy Molina granted free agency (signed with Baltimore Orioles to a contract on November 20, 2001).
October 19	Kevin Beirne granted free agency (signed with Los Angeles Dodgers to a contract on December 3, 2001). Matt DeWitt granted free agency (signed with San Diego Padres to a contract on December 18, 2001). Ryan Freel granted free agency (signed with Tampa Bay Devil Rays to a contract on November 8, 2001).

=== November 2001 ===
November 5	Tony Fernández granted free agency. Jeff Frye granted free agency (signed with Cincinnati Reds to a contract on March 25, 2002).
November 20	Brian Simmons selected off of waivers by the Chicago White Sox.

=== December 2001 ===
December 7	Acquired Eric Hinske and Justin Miller from the Oakland Athletics for Billy Koch.
December 10	Acquired Félix Heredia and a player to be named later (Jim Deschaine on December 13, 2001) from the Chicago Cubs for Alex Gonzalez.
December 12	Released Alberto Castillo.
December 13	Drafted Corey Thurman from the Kansas City Royals in the 2001 MLB Rule 5 draft. Acquired Luke Prokopec and Chad Ricketts from the Los Angeles Dodgers for César Izturis and Paul Quantrill.
December 18	Signed free agent Brian Lesher from the Milwaukee Brewers to a one-year, $245,000 contract. Signed free agent Chad Mottola from the Florida Marlins to a one-year contract. Signed free agent Chris Peters from the New York Yankees to a contract.
December 22	Luis Lopez selected off of waivers by the Oakland Athletics.

=== January 2002 ===
January 2	Acquired Tom Wilson from the Oakland Athletics for Mike Kremblas.
January 17	Acquired Brian Cooper from the Anaheim Angels for Brad Fullmer. Re-signed Kelvim Escobar to a one-year, $2.3 million contract. Re-signed Shannon Stewart to a one-year, $4.25 million contract.

=== February 2002 ===
February 6	Signed free agent Dave Berg from the Florida Marlins to a one-year, $450,000 contract.
February 10	Signed free agent Ken Huckaby from the Arizona Diamondbacks to a contract.
February 14	Signed free agent Pedro Swann from the Atlanta Braves to a contract.

=== March 2002 ===
March 27	Chris Latham selected off of waivers by the New York Mets.
March 29	Released Chris Peters.
March 30	Signed free agent Simon Pond from the Cleveland Indians to a contract.

== Regular season ==
=== Summary ===
The Blue Jays started the 2002 season with slow progress in performance. Buck Martinez was fired about a third of the way through the season, with a 20–33 record. He was replaced by third base coach Carlos Tosca, an experienced minor league manager. They went 58–51 under Tosca to finish the season 78–84. Roy Halladay, a talented but inconsistent prospect who was no more than a fifth starter who alternated between Toronto and Triple-A during his first three seasons, was relied on as the team's ace and rose to the challenge being the team's top pitcher, finishing the season with a 19–7 record and a 2.93 ERA. The hitters were led once again by Carlos Delgado. Ricciardi was credited for dumping Raúl Mondesí in mid-season to the New York Yankees to free up his salary, which in turn was used for the off-season signing of Mike Bordick, Frank Catalanotto and Tanyon Sturtze. Promising young players were assigned to key roles, including starting third baseman Eric Hinske (who later won the Rookie of the Year Award for this year) and 23-year-old centre fielder Vernon Wells, who had his first 100 RBI season replacing Mondesi. Another bright young player was Josh Phelps, a former catcher turned designated hitter, who hit 15 home runs.

=== Opening Day starters ===
- Homer Bush, 2B
- José Cruz Jr., OF
- Carlos Delgado, 1B
- Darrin Fletcher, C
- Roy Halladay, P
- Eric Hinske, 3B
- Felipe López, SS
- Raúl Mondesí, DH
- Shannon Stewart, OF
- Vernon Wells, OF

=== Season standings ===
AL East
Team	W	L	Pct.	GB	Home	Road
New York Yankees	103	58	.640	—	52‍–‍28	51‍–‍30
Boston Red Sox	93	69	.574	10½	42‍–‍39	51‍–‍30
Toronto Blue Jays	78	84	.481	25½	42‍–‍39	36‍–‍45
Baltimore Orioles	67	95	.414	36½	34‍–‍47	33‍–‍48
Tampa Bay Devil Rays	55	106	.342	48	30‍–‍51	25‍–‍55

=== American League Wild Card ===
Division leaders
Team	W	L	Pct.
New York Yankees	103	58	.640
Minnesota Twins	94	67	.584
Oakland Athletics	103	59	.636

Wild Card team (Top team qualifies for postseason)
Team	W	L	Pct.	GB
Anaheim Angels	99	63	.611	—
Boston Red Sox	93	69	.574	6
Seattle Mariners	93	69	.574	6
Chicago White Sox	81	81	.500	18
Toronto Blue Jays	78	84	.481	21
Cleveland Indians	74	88	.457	25
Texas Rangers	72	90	.444	27
Baltimore Orioles	67	95	.414	32
Kansas City Royals	62	100	.383	37
Detroit Tigers	55	106	.342	43½
Tampa Bay Devil Rays	55	106	.342	43½

=== Record vs. opponents ===
2002 American League record Source: MLB Standings Grid – 2002
Team	ANA	BAL	BOS	CWS	CLE	DET	KC	MIN	NYY	OAK	SEA	TB	TEX	TOR	NL
Anaheim	—	7–2	3–4	6–3	6–3	8–1	6–3	4–5	3–4	9–11	9–10	8–1	12–7	7–2	11–7
Baltimore	2–7	—	6–13	3–4	1–5	2–4	7–0	5–1	6–13	4–5	5–4	10–9	3–6	4–15	9–9
Boston	4–3	13–6	—	2–4	5–4	5–4	4–2	3–3	9–10	6–3	4–5	16–3	4–3	13–6	5–13
Chicago	3–6	4–3	4–2	—	9–10	12–7	11–8	8–11	2–4	2–7	5–4	4–3	5–4	4–2	8–10
Cleveland	3–6	5–1	4–5	10–9	—	10–9	9–10	8–11	3–6	2–5	3–4	4–2	4–5	3–3	6–12
Detroit	1–8	4–2	4–5	7–12	9–10	—	9–10	4–14	1–8	1–6	2–5	2–4	5–4	0–6	6–12
Kansas City	3–6	0–7	2–4	8–11	10–9	10–9	—	5–14	1–5	1–8	3–6	4–2	7–2	3–4	5–13
Minnesota	5–4	1–5	3–3	11–8	11–8	14–4	14–5	—	0–6	3–6	5–4	5–2	6–3	6–1	10–8
New York	4–3	13–6	10–9	4–2	6–3	8–1	5–1	6–0	—	5–4	4–5	13–5	4–3	10–9	11–7
Oakland	11–9	5–4	3–6	7–2	5–2	6–1	8–1	6–3	4–5	—	8–11	8–1	13–6	3–6	16–2
Seattle	10–9	4–5	5–4	4–5	4–3	5–2	6–3	4–5	5–4	11–8	—	5–4	13–7	6–3	11–7
Tampa Bay	1–8	9–10	3–16	3–4	2–4	4–2	2–4	2–5	5–13	1–8	4–5	—	4–5	8–11	7–11
Texas	7–12	6–3	3–4	4–5	5–4	4–5	2–7	3–6	3–4	6–13	7–13	5–4	—	8–1	9–9
Toronto	2–7	15–4	6–13	2–4	3–3	6–0	4–3	1–6	9–10	6–3	3–6	11–8	1–8	—	9–9

=== Transactions ===
Transactions for the Toronto Blue Jays during the 2002 regular season.

==== April 2002 ====
April 24	Player rights of Alfredo Aceves sold to Leones de Yucatán of the Mexican League.

==== May 2002 ====
May 3	Selected Pete Walker off of waivers from the New York Mets.
May 10	Released Homer Bush.
May 15	Sent Pedro Borbón Jr. to the Houston Astros as part of a conditional deal.
May 26	Acquired Cliff Politte from the Philadelphia Phillies for Dan Plesac.

==== June 2002 ====
June 21	Signed free agent Scott Winchester from the Montreal Expos to a one-year contract.

==== July 2002 ====
July 1	Acquired Scott Wiggins from the New York Yankees for Raúl Mondesí.

==== August 2002 ====
August 8	Scott Eyre selected off of waivers by the San Francisco Giants.
August 30	Selected Jason Kershner off of waivers from the San Diego Padres.

==== September 2002 ====
September 30	Released Brian Cooper.

=== 2002 draft picks ===
The 2002 MLB draft was held on June 4–5.

Round	Pick	Player	Position	College/School	Nationality	Signed
1	14	Russ Adams	SS	North Carolina	(United States)	2002–06–07
2	55	Dave Bush	RHP	Wake Forest	(United States)	2002–06–04
3	86	Justin Maureau	LHP	Wichita State	(United States)	–
4	110	Adam Peterson	RHP	Wichita State	(United States)	2002–06–11
5	146	Chad Pleiness	RHP	Central Michigan	(United States)	–
6	176	Jason Perry	OF	Georgia Tech	(United States)	2002–06–22
7	206	Brian Grant	RHP	C.B. Aycock High School (NC)	(United States)	–
8	236	Chris Leonard	LHP	Miami (FL)	(United States)	–
9	266	Russ Savickas	RHP	Johnston High School	(United States)	–
10	296	Eric Arnold	2B	Rice	(United States)	–

=== Roster ===
2002 Toronto Blue Jays
Roster
Pitchers: 51 Pedro Borbón Jr.; 37 Brian Bowles; 26 Chris Carpenter; 40 Scott Cassidy; 38 Pasqual Coco; 50 Brian Cooper; 45 Kelvim Escobar; 29 Scott Eyre; 36 Bob File; 32 Roy Halladay; 43 Mark Hendrickson; 49 Félix Heredia; 46 Jason Kershner; 21 Esteban Loaiza; 28 Brandon Lyon; 34 Justin Miller; 39 Steve Parris; 19 Dan Plesac; 19 Cliff Politte; 44 Luke Prokopec; 53 Mike Smith; 35 Corey Thurman; 41 Pete Walker; 57 Scott Wiggins	Catchers: 29 Kevin Cash; 9 Darrin Fletcher; 20 Ken Huckaby; 17 Josh Phelps; 15 Tom Wilson; Infielders: 2 Dave Berg; 18 Homer Bush; 25 Carlos Delgado; 11 Eric Hinske; 3 Orlando Hudson; 6 Joe Lawrence; 7 Felipe López; 5 Chris Woodward	Outfielders: 23 José Cruz Jr.; 31 Brian Lesher; 43 Raúl Mondesí; 24 Shannon Stewart; 8 Pedro Swann; 10 Vernon Wells; 54 Jayson Werth; 16 DeWayne Wise	Manager: 13 Buck Martinez; 14 Carlos Tosca; Coaches: 56 Mike Barnett (hitting); 53 Mark Connor (pitching); 16 Garth Iorg (first base); 58 John Gibbons (first base); 47 Gil Patterson (bullpen); 4 Cookie Rojas (bench); 14 Carlos Tosca (third base); 55 Brian Butterfield (third base)

=== Game log ===
2002 Game Log
April: 8–16 (Home: 3–8; Away: 5–8)

#	Date	Opponent	Score	Win	Loss	Save	Attendance	Record
1	April 1	@ Red Sox	12–11	Escobar (1–0)	Urbina (0–1)		33,520	1–0
--	April 3	@ Red Sox	Postponed (rain) Rescheduled for July 2					
2	April 4	Twins	7–2	Halladay (1–0)	Mays (0–1)		47,469	2–0
3	April 5	Twins	4–3	Reed (1–0)	Lyon (0–1)	Guardado (3)	15,784	2–1
4	April 6	Twins	7–5	Hawkins (1–0)	Eyre (0–1)	Guardado (4)	18,947	2–2
5	April 7	Twins	10–6	Radke (1–0)	Cooper (0–1)		21,071	2–3
6	April 8	Yankees	16–3	Wells (2–0)	Prokopec (0–1)		16,073	2–4
7	April 9	Yankees	5–2	Mussina (2–0)	Plesac (0–1)	Rivera (4)	18,003	2–5
8	April 10	Yankees	9–7	Borbón (1–0)	Lilly (0–1)	Escobar (1)	19,124	3–5
9	April 11	Yankees	11–3	Eyre (1–1)	Clemens (1–2)		20,091	4–5
10	April 12	@ Devil Rays	14–7	Miller (1–0)	Rupe (1–1)		11,058	5–5
11	April 13	@ Devil Rays	5–4	Prokopec (1–1)	Sturtze (0–2)	Escobar (2)	11,143	6–5
12	April 14	@ Devil Rays	5–4 (10)	Yan (1–0)	Coco (0–1)		11,222	6–6
13	April 16	Red Sox	14–3	Castillo (1–0)	Lyon (0–2)	Arrojo (1)	16,069	6–7
14	April 17	Red Sox	10–3	Oliver (2–0)	Eyre (1–2)		16,572	6–8
15	April 19	@ Yankees	6–5	Rivera (1–1)	File (0–1)		36,136	6–9
16	April 20	@ Yankees	5–4 (10)	Plesac (1–1)	Mendoza (0–2)		39,265	7–9
17	April 21	@ Yankees	9–2	Clemens (2–2)	Carpenter (0–1)		43,309	7–10
18	April 23	@ Rangers	2–1	Lyon (1–2)	Valdez (1–3)	Escobar (3)	20,472	8–10
19	April 24	@ Rangers	3–2	Rogers (2–0)	Prokopec (1–2)	Irabu (2)	21,072	8–11
20	April 25	@ Rangers	11–9	Van Poppel (1–0)	Plesac (1–2)	Irabu (3)	24,162	8–12
21	April 26	@ Angels	4–0	Appier (2–1)	Smith (0–1)	Percival (3)	25,296	8–13
22	April 27	@ Angels	11–4	Sele (1–2)	Borbón (1–1)		29,112	8–14
23	April 28	@ Angels	8–5 (14)	Lukasiewicz (1–0)	Borbón (1–2)		25,073	8–15
24	April 30	Rangers	10–3	Rogers (3–0)	Prokopec (1–3)		12,571	8–16

May: 10–17 (Home: 5–12; Away: 5–5)

#	Date	Opponent	Score	Win	Loss	Save	Attendance	Record
25	May 1	Rangers	8–1	Burba (2–0)	Halladay (1–1)		13,055	8–17
26	May 2	Rangers	5–3	Bell (2–0)	Smith (0–2)	Irabu (6)	13,011	8–18
27	May 3	Angels	6–4	Sele (2–2)	Lyon (1–3)	Percival (4)	13,183	8–19
28	May 4	Angels	4–1	Miller (2–0)	Schoeneweis (1–4)	Escobar (4)	20,558	9–19
29	May 5	Angels	8–2	Ortiz (3–3)	Prokopec (1–4)		24,046	9–20
30	May 7	@ Mariners	4–1	Halladay (2–1)	Baldwin (3–2)	Escobar (5)	34,500	10–20
31	May 8	@ Mariners	5–4 (10)	Sasaki (2–0)	Eyre (1–3)		35,190	10–21
32	May 9	@ Mariners	8–7 (11)	Franklin (3–1)	Thurman (0–1)		37,734	10–22
33	May 10	@ Athletics	6–2	Prokopec (2–4)	Mulder (2–2)		10,824	11–22
34	May 11	@ Athletics	7–4	Zito (3–2)	Miller (2–1)		21,115	11–23
35	May 12	@ Athletics	11–4	Halladay (3–1)	Lidle (1–5)	Walker (1)	19,519	12–23
36	May 14	Mariners	6–3	Loaiza (1–0)	García (4–3)	Escobar (6)	14,308	13–23
37	May 15	Mariners	8–6	Rhodes (2–1)	Escobar (1–1)	Sasaki (9)	17,012	13–24
38	May 16	Mariners	15–2	Piñeiro (4–0)	Prokopec (2–5)		14,280	13–25
39	May 17	Athletics	7–1	Halladay (4–1)	Mulder (2–3)		14,061	14–25
40	May 18	Athletics	6–3	Miller (3–1)	Fyhrie (1–3)	Escobar (7)	17,846	15–25
41	May 19	Athletics	11–0	Loaiza (2–0)	Hudson (3–6)		23,408	16–25
42	May 20	@ Yankees	6–3	Mendoza (1–2)	Heredia (0–1)	Rivera (14)	30,657	16–26
43	May 21	@ Yankees	4–1	Mussina (6–2)	Prokopec (2–6)	Karsay (1)	26,531	16–27
44	May 22	@ Yankees	8–3	Halladay (5–1)	Hernández (0–1)		44,284	17–27
45	May 24	Indians	5–2	Drese (5–3)	Miller (3–2)	Wickman (10)	16,385	17–28
46	May 25	Indians	3–0	Sabathia (4–4)	Loaiza (2–1)	Wickman (11)	21,589	17–29
47	May 26	Indians	3–1	Colón (6–3)	Prokopec (2–7)		22,380	17–30
48	May 27	Red Sox	8–6	Castillo (3–5)	Halladay (5–2)	Urbina (16)	14,108	17–31
49	May 28	Red Sox	6–4	Wakefield (2–1)	Escobar (1–2)	Urbina (17)	13,075	17–32
50	May 29	Red Sox	7–4	Burkett (6–0)	Cassidy (0–1)	Fossum (1)	17,875	17–33
51	May 31	@ Tigers	4–2	Loaiza (3–1)	Bernero (1–1)	Escobar (8)	28,578	18–33

June: 15–12 (Home: 9–4; Away: 6–8)

#	Date	Opponent	Score	Win	Loss	Save	Attendance	Record
52	June 1	@ Tigers	4–1 (11)	Politte (1–0)	Patterson (0–1)	Escobar (9)	19,581	19–33
53	June 2	@ Tigers	7–6	Halladay (6–2)	Weaver (4–7)	Escobar (10)	21,399	20–33
54	June 3	Devil Rays	6–1	Walker (1–0)	Sturtze (0–7)		13,002	21–33
55	June 4	Devil Rays	3–1	Miller (4–2)	Wilson (2–4)	Escobar (11)	13,162	22–33
56	June 5	Devil Rays	8–6	Álvarez (1–1)	Loaiza (3–2)		13,643	22–34
57	June 6	Devil Rays	5–4	Escobar (2–2)	Harper (2–3)		24,069	23–34
58	June 7	Rockies	8–0	Halladay (7–2)	Hampton (3–7)		20,032	24–34
59	June 8	Rockies	3–1	Walker (2–0)	Thomson (6–5)	Escobar (12)	21,298	25–34
60	June 9	Rockies	3–2	Escobar (3–2)	Jiménez (1–4)		20,328	26–34
61	June 10	Giants	6–5	Thurman (1–1)	Rueter (7–4)	Escobar (13)	18,081	27–34
62	June 11	Giants	9–2	Jensen (6–5)	Lyon (1–4)		20,228	27–35
63	June 12	Giants	6–3	Hernández (6–6)	Halladay (7–3)	Nen (17)	21,106	27–36
64	June 14	@ Expos	8–2	Ohka (6–3)	Miller (4–3)		7,557	27–37
65	June 15	@ Expos	9–3	Day (1–0)	Loaiza (3–3)		12,474	27–38
66	June 16	@ Expos	6–5	Stewart (3–1)	Escobar (3–3)		15,425	27–39
67	June 18	@ Dodgers	2–1	Halladay (8–3)	Ashby (6–6)		24,991	28–39
68	June 19	@ Dodgers	5–2	Ishii (11–2)	Miller (4–4)	Gagné (24)	31,429	28–40
69	June 20	@ Dodgers	2–1	Pérez (8–3)	Loaiza (3–4)	Gagné (25)	24,977	28–41
70	June 21	@ Diamondbacks	4–3	Kim (3–0)	Escobar (3–4)		34,263	28–42
71	June 22	@ Diamondbacks	6–3	Carpenter (1–1)	Batista (4–4)		39,018	29–42
72	June 23	@ Diamondbacks	9–3	Halladay (9–3)	Anderson (2–7)		36,247	30–42
73	June 25	@ Devil Rays	20–11	Walker (3–0)	Sosa (0–1)		10,380	31–42
74	June 26	@ Devil Rays	4–2	Sturtze (1–8)	Parris (0–1)	Yan (10)	10,154	31–43
75	June 27	@ Devil Rays	6–4	Harper (3–3)	Politte (1–1)	Yan (11)	10,328	31–44
76	June 28	Expos	2–1	Armas (8–7)	Halladay (9–4)	Stewart (9)	20,848	31–45
77	June 29	Expos	5–4 (10)	Escobar (4–4)	Herges (2–2)		24,344	32–45
78	June 30	Expos	7–5	Eyre (2–3)	Lloyd (2–3)	Escobar (14)	24,965	33–45

July: 13–14 (Home: 8–3; Away: 5–11)

#	Date	Opponent	Score	Win	Loss	Save	Attendance	Record
79	July 1	@ Red Sox	4–0	Martínez (10–2)	Parris (0–2)		33,005	33–46
80	July 2	@ Red Sox	2–1	Banks (2–0)	Eyre (2–4)	Embree (1)	32,993	33–47
81	July 2	@ Red Sox	6–4	Kim (2–0)	Smith (0–3)	Embree (2)	32,902	33–48
82	July 3	@ Red Sox	5–2	Gomes (1–0)	Politte (1–2)	Urbina (22)	31,777	33–49
83	July 4	@ Red Sox	9–5	Lowe (12–4)	Heredia (0–2)		32,086	33–50
84	July 5	@ Yankees	6–3	Hernández (5–2)	Loaiza (3–5)	Rivera (21)	46,788	33–51
85	July 6	@ Yankees	8–3	Parris (1–2)	Pettitte (2–3)		55,005	34–51
86	July 7	@ Yankees	10–6	Weaver (7–8)	Thurman (1–2)		46,922	34–52
87	July 11	Red Sox	10–3	Burkett (8–3)	Walker (3–1)		19,494	34–53
88	July 12	Red Sox	5–0	Halladay (10–4)	Lowe (12–5)		20,185	35–53
89	July 13	Red Sox	4–1	Carpenter (2–1)	Castillo (5–10)		28,112	36–53
90	July 14	Red Sox	6–5	Escobar (5–4)	Urbina (0–4)		24,140	37–53
91	July 15	Yankees	8–5	Parris (2–2)	Hernández (5–3)	Escobar (15)	25,371	38–53
92	July 16	Yankees	7–6	Karsay (4–4)	Politte (1–3)	Rivera (23)	27,197	38–54
93	July 17	Orioles	7–1	Halladay (11–4)	Johnson (3–7)		17,015	39–54
94	July 18	Orioles	5–4	Carpenter (3–1)	Driskill (6–3)	Escobar (16)	17,004	40–54
95	July 19	Devil Rays	11–8	Loaiza (4–5)	Creek (2–1)	Escobar (17)	16,985	41–54
96	July 20	Devil Rays	12–10	Parris (3–2)	de los Santos (0–1)	Escobar (18)	24,449	42–54
97	July 21	Devil Rays	7–5	Sosa (1–2)	Walker (3–2)	Yan (12)	21,442	42–55
98	July 22	@ Orioles	6–3	Halladay (12–4)	Johnson (3–8)	Escobar (19)	27,235	43–55
--	July 23	@ Orioles	Postponed (rain) Rescheduled for August 24					
99	July 24	@ Orioles	5–2	Carpenter (4–1)	Driskill (6–4)	Politte (1)	30,961	44–55
100	July 26	@ Twins	10–5	Fiore (9–2)	Prokopec (2–8)		25,049	44–56
101	July 27	@ Twins	5–4 (10)	Wells (1–1)	Escobar (5–5)		40,306	44–57
102	July 28	@ Twins	4–0	Santana (5–2)	Loaiza (4–6)		30,554	44–58
103	July 29	@ Royals	4–1	Byrd (14–7)	Carpenter (4–2)		14,759	44–59
104	July 30	@ Royals	13–4	Walker (4–2)	Asencio (2–4)		13,066	45–59
105	July 31	@ Royals	9–2	Parris (4–2)	Sedlacek (1–2)		13,461	46–59

August: 13–17 (Home: 7–9; Away: 6–8)

#	Date	Opponent	Score	Win	Loss	Save	Attendance	Record
106	August 1	@ Royals	3–2	Halladay (13–4)	Hernández (1–1)	Escobar (20)	12,669	47–59
107	August 2	Orioles	9–8	Ryan (2–0)	Escobar (5–6)	Julio (21)	19,052	47–60
108	August 3	Orioles	8–4	Driskill (7–5)	Carpenter (4–3)		17,534	47–61
109	August 4	Orioles	5–4	Heredia (1–2)	Ryan (2–1)	Escobar (21)	17,637	48–61
110	August 5	Orioles	7–1	Parris (5–2)	López (12–4)		15,245	49–61
111	August 6	Mariners	14–12	Halladay (14–4)	Baldwin (7–8)	Escobar (22)	25,392	50–61
112	August 7	Mariners	5–4 (10)	Sasaki (3–5)	Prokopec (2–9)		27,733	50–62
113	August 8	Mariners	3–1	Moyer (12–4)	Carpenter (4–4)	Nelson (1)	25,486	50–63
114	August 9	Angels	5–4	Walker (5–2)	Ortiz (9–9)	Escobar (23)	18,728	51–63
115	August 10	Angels	11–4	Lackey (4–2)	Parris (5–3)		25,118	51–64
116	August 11	Angels	1–0	Washburn (15–3)	Halladay (14–5)	Percival (27)	34,013	51–65
117	August 12	@ Athletics	2–1	Loaiza (5–6)	Harang (4–3)	Escobar (24)	14,178	52–65
118	August 13	@ Athletics	5–4	Zito (16–5)	Carpenter (4–5)	Koch (29)	17,466	52–66
119	August 14	@ Athletics	4–2	Hudson (9–9)	Walker (5–3)	Koch (30)	40,528	52–67
120	August 16	@ Rangers	6–5	Kolb (3–1)	Escobar (5–7)		31,194	52–68
121	August 17	@ Rangers	9–5	Reyes (1–0)	Parris (5–4)		30,426	52–69
122	August 18	@ Rangers	10–7	Myette (2–4)	Loaiza (5–7)		20,214	52–70
123	August 19	Royals	2–0	Walker (6–3)	Byrd (14–9)	Escobar (25)	16,218	53–70
124	August 20	Royals	6–5 (12)	Affeldt (2–4)	Cassidy (0–2)	Hernández (22)	20,002	53–71
125	August 21	Royals	7–4	Sedlacek (3–3)	Halladay (14–6)	Hernández (23)	25,304	53–72
126	August 23	@ Orioles	11–7	Brock (2–1)	Cassidy (0–3)	Ryan (1)	32,955	53–73
127	August 24	@ Orioles	4–1	Walker (7–3)	Driskill (8–7)	Escobar (26)	25,880	54–73
128	August 24	@ Orioles	8–3	Loaiza (6–7)	Bauer (6–5)		30,498	55–73
129	August 25	@ Orioles	5–2	Miller (5–4)	Johnson (4–10)	Escobar (27)	30,812	56–73
130	August 26	@ White Sox	8–4	Thurman (2–2)	Parque (1–4)		15,760	57–73
131	August 27	@ White Sox	8–4 (10)	Osuna (7–2)	Cassidy (0–4)		12,185	57–74
132	August 28	@ White Sox	8–0	Garland (9–10)	Parris (5–5)		12,972	57–75
133	August 29	Yankees	7–4	Loaiza (7–7)	Clemens (11–5)		32,679	58–75
134	August 30	Yankees	9–7	Weaver (8–11)	Walker (7–4)	Karsay (8)	24,301	58–76
135	August 31	Yankees	5–1	Miller (6–4)	Hernández (7–4)		36,021	59–76

September: 19–8 (Home: 10–3; Away: 9–5)

#	Date	Opponent	Score	Win	Loss	Save	Attendance	Record
136	September 1	Yankees	7–6	Halladay (15–6)	Wells (15–7)	Escobar (28)	32,577	60–76
137	September 2	White Sox	5–3	Garland (10–10)	Thurman (2–3)	Marte (8)	18,373	60–77
138	September 3	White Sox	5–4	Rauch (1–1)	Loaiza (7–8)	Marte (9)	14,427	60–78
139	September 4	White Sox	6–2	Walker (8–4)	Wright (10–12)		21,122	61–78
140	September 5	@ Red Sox	5–4	Miller (7–4)	Hermanson (1–1)	Escobar (29)	30,021	62–78
141	September 6	@ Red Sox	7–2	Wakefield (9–5)	Halladay (15–7)		31,847	62–79
142	September 7	@ Red Sox	4–1	Fossum (4–3)	Bowles (0–1)	Urbina (31)	31,591	62–80
143	September 8	@ Red Sox	9–4	Loaiza (8–8)	Castillo (5–14)		31,344	63–80
144	September 9	@ Indians	11–9	Bowles (1–1)	Sadler (1–1)	Escobar (30)	28,567	64–80
145	September 10	@ Indians	5–4	Bowles (2–1)	Wohlers (2–4)	Escobar (31)	24,312	65–80
146	September 11	@ Indians	6–5 (11)	Cassidy (1–4)	Elder (0–1)	Kershner (1)	26,609	66–80
147	September 13	Devil Rays	5–2	Halladay (16–7)	Brazelton (0–1)	Escobar (32)	14,257	67–80
148	September 14	Devil Rays	8–4	Hendrickson (1–0)	Sturtze (3–17)	Escobar (33)	22,155	68–80
149	September 15	Devil Rays	7–4	Kennedy (8–11)	Loaiza (8–9)	Yan (18)	16,513	68–81
150	September 16	@ Orioles	2–0	Walker (9–4)	Ponson (7–7)	Escobar (34)	20,279	69–81
151	September 17	@ Orioles	10–4	Stephens (2–4)	Miller (7–5)		20,486	69–82
152	September 18	@ Orioles	2–1	Halladay (17–7)	Douglass (0–4)	Escobar (35)	20,928	70–82
153	September 19	@ Orioles	9–3	Hendrickson (2–0)	López (15–8)		24,162	71–82
154	September 20	@ Devil Rays	11–7	Sturtze (4–17)	Loaiza (8–10)		12,682	71–83
155	September 21	@ Devil Rays	4–3	Carter (2–0)	Walker (9–5)		13,351	71–84
156	September 22	@ Devil Rays	12–6	Miller (8–5)	Wilson (6–11)		19,625	72–84
157	September 24	Orioles	11–1	Halladay (18–7)	Douglass (0–5)		14,438	73–84
158	September 25	Orioles	3–2	Hendrickson (3–0)	López (15–9)	Escobar (36)	17,287	74–84
159	September 26	Orioles	5–1	Loaiza (9–10)	Hentgen (0–4)		13,127	75–84
160	September 27	Tigers	5–2	Walker (10–5)	Van Hekken (1–3)	Escobar (37)	15,407	76–84
161	September 28	Tigers	10–2	Miller (9–5)	Beverlin (0–3)		19,541	77–84
162	September 29	Tigers	1–0	Halladay (19–7)	Maroth (6–10)	Escobar (38)	30,029	78–84

== Player stats ==
= Indicates team leader

=== Batting ===
==== Starters by position ====
Note: Pos = Position; G = Games played; AB = At bats; H = Hits; Avg. = Batting average; HR = Home runs; RBI = Runs batted in

Pos	Player	G	AB	H	Avg.	HR	RBI
C	Ken Huckaby	88	273	67	.245	3	22
1B	Carlos Delgado	143	505	140	.277	33	108
2B	Orlando Hudson	54	192	53	.276	4	23
SS	Chris Woodward	90	312	86	.276	13	45
3B	Eric Hinske	151	566	158	.279	24	84
LF	Shannon Stewart	141	577	175	.303	10	45
CF	Vernon Wells	159	608	167	.275	23	100
RF	Raúl Mondesí	75	299	67	.224	15	45
DH	Josh Phelps	74	265	82	.309	15	58

==== Other batters ====
Note: G = Games played; AB = At bats; H = Hits; Avg. = Batting average; HR = Home runs; RBI = Runs batted in

Player	G	AB	H	Avg.	HR	RBI
José Cruz Jr.	124	466	114	.245	18	70
Dave Berg	109	374	101	.270	4	39
Felipe López	85	282	64	.227	8	34
Tom Wilson	96	265	68	.257	8	37
Joe Lawrence	55	150	27	.180	2	15
Darrin Fletcher	45	127	28	.220	3	22
DeWayne Wise	42	112	20	.179	3	13
Homer Bush	23	78	18	.231	1	2
Jayson Werth	15	46	12	.261	0	6
Brian Lesher	24	38	5	.132	0	2
Kevin Cash	7	14	2	.143	0	0
Pedro Swann	13	12	1	.083	0	1

=== Pitching ===
==== Starting pitchers ====
Note: G = Games pitched; IP = Innings pitched; W = Wins; L = Losses; ERA = Earned run average; SO = Strikeouts

Player	G	IP	W	L	ERA	SO
Roy Halladay	34	239.1	19	7	2.93	168
Esteban Loaiza	25	151.1	9	10	5.71	87
Steve Parris	14	75.1	5	5	5.97	48
Chris Carpenter	13	73.1	4	5	5.28	45
Brian Cooper	2	8.1	0	1	14.04	3

==== Other pitchers ====
Note: G = Games pitched; IP = Innings pitched; W = Wins; L = Losses; ERA = Earned run average; SO = Strikeouts

Player	G	IP	W	L	ERA	SO
Pete Walker	37	139.1	10	5	4.33	80
Justin Miller	25	102.1	9	5	5.54	68
Luke Prokopec	22	71.2	2	9	6.78	41
Brandon Lyon	15	62.0	1	4	6.53	30
Mark Hendrickson	16	36.2	3	0	2.45	21
Mike Smith	14	35.1	0	3	6.62	16

==== Relief pitchers ====
Note: G = Games pitched; W = Wins; L = Losses; SV = Saves; ERA = Earned run average; SO = Strikeouts

Player	G	W	L	SV	ERA	SO
Kelvim Escobar	76	5	7	38	4.27	85
Scott Cassidy	58	1	4	0	5.73	48
Cliff Politte	55	1	3	1	3.61	57
Félix Heredia	53	1	2	0	3.61	31
Scott Eyre	49	2	4	0	4.97	51
Corey Thurman	43	2	3	0	4.37	56
Dan Plesac	19	1	2	0	3.38	14
Brian Bowles	17	2	1	0	4.05	19
Pedro Borbón Jr.	16	1	2	0	4.97	11
Jason Kershner	10	0	0	1	1.69	7
Bob File	5	0	1	0	18.90	2
Scott Wiggins	3	0	0	0	3.38	3
Pasqual Coco	2	0	1	0	18.00	0

== Award winners ==
- Eric Hinske, American League Rookie of the Year Award
- Eric Hinske, The Sporting News Rookie of the Year Award

All-Star Game

- Roy Halladay, pitcher

== Farm system ==
Level	Team	League	Manager
AAA	Syracuse SkyChiefs	International League	Omar Malavé
AA	Tennessee Smokies	Southern League	Rocket Wheeler
A	Dunedin Blue Jays	Florida State League	Marty Pevey
A	Charleston Alley Cats	South Atlantic League	Paul Elliott
A-Short Season	Auburn Doubledays	New York–Penn League	Dennis Holmberg
Rookie	Medicine Hat Blue Jays	Pioneer League	Rolando Pino
