= Toronto Blue Jays all-time roster =

List of baseball players

The following is a list of players both past and current who appeared at least in one game for the Toronto Blue Jays American League franchise (1977–present).

Players in Bold are members of the National Baseball Hall of Fame.

Players in Italics have been honoured on the Blue Jays Level of Excellence.

== A ==
- Jeremy Accardo
- Juan Acevedo
- Jim Acker
- Jason Adam
- Glenn Adams
- Riley Adams
- Russ Adams
- Terry Adams
- Willie Aikens
- Danny Ainge
- Andrew Albers
- Butch Alberts
- Doyle Alexander
- Edgardo Alfonzo
- Anthony Alford
- Gary Allenson
- Nick Allgeyer
- Carlos Almanzar
- **Roberto Alomar**
- Henderson Álvarez
- Brett Anderson
- Chase Anderson
- Shaun Anderson
- Clayton Andrews
- Tanner Andrews
- Luis Andújar
- Dustin Antolin
- Nori Aoki
- Luis Aquino
- J. P. Arencibia
- Spencer Arrighetti
- Alan Ashby
- Doug Ault
- John Axford

== B ==
- Bob Bailor
- Doug Bair
- Bryan Baker
- Dave Baker
- John Bale
- Anthony Banda
- Josh Banks
- Rod Barajas
- Jesse Barfield
- Addison Barger
- Kevin Barker
- Mike Barlow
- Danny Barnes
- Jacob Barnes
- Darwin Barney
- Michael Barrett
- Anthony Bass
- Chris Bassitt
- Brett Bateman
- Miguel Batista
- Tony Batista
- Kevin Batiste
- Howard Battle
- José Bautista
- Charlie Beamon Jr.
- Jeremy Beasley
- Chad Beck
- Kevin Beirne
- Jeff Beliveau
- Derek Bell
- George Bell
- Brandon Belt
- Juan Beníquez
- Armando Benítez
- Joaquín Benoit
- Juan Berenguer
- Dave Berg
- Travis Bergen
- José Berríos
- Gerónimo Berroa
- Steward Berroa
- Jon Berti
- Joe Biagini
- Bo Bichette
- Shane Bieber
- Cavan Biggio
- Bud Black
- Willie Blair
- Casey Blake
- Henry Blanco
- Brian Bohanon
- Mike Bolsinger
- Mark Bomback
- Emilio Bonifacio
- Barry Bonnell
- Pedro Borbón Jr.
- Pat Borders
- Mike Bordick
- Ryan Borucki
- Rick Bosetti
- Buddy Boshers
- Denis Boucher
- Brian Bowles
- Steve Bowling
- Matthew Boyd
- Jackie Bradley Jr.
- Steve Braun
- Bob Brenly
- Socrates Brito
- Tilson Brito
- Scott Brow
- Bobby Brown
- Kevin Brown
- Justin Bruihl
- Jacob Brumfield
- Tom Bruno
- Clay Buchholz
- Taylor Buchholz
- John Buck
- Mark Buehrle
- DeWayne Buice
- Bryan Bullington
- A. J. Burnett
- Andy Burns
- Ryan Burr
- Brian Burres
- Jeff Burroughs
- David Bush
- Homer Bush
- Tom Buskey
- Sal Butera
- Rich Butler
- Rob Butler
- Jeff Byrd

== C ==
- Francisco Cabrera
- Génesis Cabrera
- Melky Cabrera
- Greg Cadaret
- Miguel Cairo
- Daz Cameron
- Shawn Camp
- Leonel Campos
- Sil Campusano
- Willie Cañate
- John Candelaria
- Tom Candiotti
- Joe Cannon
- José Canseco
- Vinny Capra
- Jesse Carlson
- Andrew Carpenter
- Chris Carpenter
- David Carpenter
- Giovanni Carrara
- Joel Carreño
- Ezequiel Carrera
- Joe Carter
- Rico Carty
- Kevin Cash
- Scott Cassidy
- Alberto Castillo
- Frank Castillo
- Max Castillo
- Tony Castillo
- Anthony Castro
- Miguel Castro
- Frank Catalanotto
- Bill Caudill
- Dylan Cease
- Brett Cecil
- Darrell Ceciliani
- Domingo Cedeño
- Brendan Cellucci
- Rick Cerone
- John Cerutti
- Gustavo Chacín
- Matt Chapman
- Tyler Chatwood
- Jesse Chavez
- Raúl Chávez
- Vinnie Chulk
- Adam Cimber
- Jim Clancy
- Bryan Clark
- Howie Clark
- Stan Clarke
- Jonatan Clase
- Royce Clayton
- Roger Clemens
- Ernie Clement
- Tyler Clippard
- Buck Coats
- Pasqual Coco
- Robert Coello
- Chris Coghlan
- Phil Coke
- Chris Colabello
- A. J. Cole
- Taylor Cole
- Joe Coleman
- Darnell Coles
- Dave Collins
- Zack Collins
- David Cone
- Brian Cooper
- David Cooper
- Don Cooper
- Scott Copeland
- Patrick Corbin
- Francisco Cordero
- Jimmy Cordero
- Marty Cordova
- Brad Cornett
- Danny Cox
- Ted Cox
- Tim Crabtree
- Evan Crawford
- Doug Creek
- Felipe Crespo
- Eric Crozier
- José Cruz Jr.
- Rhiner Cruz
- Víctor Cruz
- José Cuas
- Darwin Cubillán
- Steve Cummings
- Brandon Cumpton

== D ==
- Omar Daal
- Mark Dalesandro
- Chad Dallas
- Hagen Danner
- Mike Darr
- Danny Darwin
- Tom Davey
- Bob Davis
- Dick Davis
- Doug Davis
- Jonathan Davis
- Rajai Davis
- Steve Davis
- Ken Dayley
- Brett de Geus
- Jordan De Jong
- Luis De Los Santos
- Valerio de los Santos
- Dennis DeBarr
- Paul DeJong
- Steve Delabar
- Carlos Delgado
- David Dellucci
- Matt Dermody
- Mark DeRosa
- Jeff DeWillis
- Matt DeWitt
- Scott Diamond
- Aledmys Díaz
- Carlos Díaz
- Jonathan Diaz
- Robinzon Díaz
- Yennsy Díaz
- Corey Dickerson
- R. A. Dickey
- Rafael Dolis
- Matt Dominguez
- Seranthony Domínguez
- Andy Dominique
- Josh Donaldson
- Octavio Dotel
- Félix Doubront
- Sean Douglass
- Scott Downs
- Kyle Drabek
- Oliver Drake
- Brandon Drury
- Rob Ducey
- Ryan Dull
- Mariano Duncan
- Jarrod Dyson
- Sam Dyson

== E ==
- David Eckstein
- Cam Eden
- Butch Edge
- Carl Edwards Jr.
- Mark Eichhorn
- Brandon Eisert
- Edwin Encarnación
- Jim Eppard
- Kelvim Escobar
- Yunel Escobar
- Santiago Espinal
- Paolo Espino
- Nino Espinosa
- Bobby Estalella
- Lázaro Estrada
- Marco Estrada
- Leo Estrella
- Tom Evans
- Dana Eveland
- Sam Ewing
- Scott Eyre

== F ==
- Ron Fairly
- Danny Farquhar
- Sal Fasano
- Ryan Feierabend
- Scott Feldman
- Junior Félix
- José Fernández
- Tony Fernández
- Cecil Fielder
- Luis Figueroa
- Bob File
- Tom Filer
- Braydon Fisher
- Derek Fisher
- Mike Flanagan
- Josh Fleming
- Huck Flener
- Darrin Fletcher
- Gavin Floyd
- Mason Fluharty
- Wilmer Font
- Ty France
- Bowden Francis
- Jeff Francis
- Ben Francisco
- Frank Francisco
- Juan Francisco
- John Frascatore
- Willie Fraser
- Jason Frasor
- Kevin Frederick
- Ryan Freel
- Dave Freisleben
- Luis Frias
- Jeff Frye
- Brad Fullmer

== G ==
- Matt Gage
- Freddy Galvis
- Carlos García
- Dámaso García
- Jaime García
- Pedro García
- Yimi García
- Jerry Garvin
- Chad Gaudin
- Kevin Gausman
- Sam Gaviglio
- Dave Geisel
- Justin Germano
- Chris Getz
- Ray Giannelli
- Ken Giles
- Tom Gilles
- Cole Gillespie
- Andrés Giménez
- Chad Girodo
- Troy Glaus
- Brad Glenn
- Gary Glover
- Ryan Glynn
- Zack Godley
- Ryan Goins
- Yan Gomes
- Chris Gomez
- Luis Gómez
- Rene Gonzales
- Alex L. González
- Alex S. Gonzalez
- Édgar González
- Curtis Goodwin
- Don Gordon
- Anthony Gose
- Jim Gott
- Mauro Gozzo
- Curtis Granderson
- Kendall Graveman
- Craig Grebeck
- Chad Green
- Nick Green
- Shawn Green
- Charlie Greene
- Todd Greene
- Willie Greene
- Kevin Gregg
- Randal Grichuk
- Alfredo Griffin
- Foster Griffin
- John-Ford Griffin
- Jason Grilli
- Steve Grilli
- Lee Gronkiewicz
- Gabe Gross
- Kelly Gruber
- Javy Guerra
- Vladimir Guerrero Jr.
- Taylor Guerrieri
- Preston Guilmet
- Eric Gunderson
- Lourdes Gurriel Jr.
- Mark Guthrie
- Juan Guzmán

== H ==
- Matt Hague
- Darren Hall
- **Roy Halladay**
- Joey Hamilton
- Brad Hand
- Alen Hanson
- Erik Hanson
- J. A. Happ
- Steve Hargan
- Lucas Harrell
- Chuck Hartenstein
- Thomas Hatch
- John Hattig
- Mike Hauschild
- LaTroy Hawkins
- Dirk Hayhurst
- Jeff Hearron
- Adeiny Hechavarria
- Tyler Heineman
- **Rickey Henderson**
- Mark Hendrickson
- Liam Hendriks
- Tom Henke
- Pat Hentgen
- Félix Heredia
- Chad Hermansen
- Pedro Hernández
- Teoscar Hernández
- Toby Hernández
- Xavier Hernandez
- Jordan Hicks
- Aaron Hill
- Glenallen Hill
- Shawn Hill
- Shea Hillenbrand
- Eric Hinske
- Paul Hodgson
- Jeff Hoffman
- Jarrett Hoffpauir
- Dave Hollins
- Vince Horsman
- Willie Horton
- Spencer Horwitz
- TJ House
- J. P. Howell
- Roy Howell
- Jared Hoying
- Ken Huckaby
- John Hudek
- Daniel Hudson
- Orlando Hudson
- Mike Huff
- Phil Huffman
- Edwin Hurtado
- Drew Hutchison
- Tommy Hutton
- Colt Hynes

== I ==
- Ryota Igarashi
- Alexis Infante
- Joe Inglett
- Garth Iorg
- César Izturis
- Maicer Izturis

== J ==
- Darrin Jackson
- Edwin Jackson
- Jay Jackson
- Roy Lee Jackson
- Danny Jansen
- Casey Janssen
- Marty Janzen
- Jesse Jefferson
- Jeremy Jeffress
- Chad Jenkins
- Eloy Jimenez
- Leo Jimenez
- Cliff Johnson
- Dan Johnson
- Dane Johnson
- Jerry Johnson
- Joe Johnson
- Josh Johnson
- Kelly Johnson
- Reed Johnson
- Tim Johnson
- Tony Johnson
- Ricardo Jordan
- Caleb Joseph
- Hayden Juenger

== K ==
- Gosuke Katoh
- Munenori Kawasaki
- Anthony Kay
- Pat Kelly (C)
- Pat Kelly (IF)
- Buddy Kennedy
- Joe Kennedy
- **Jeff Kent**
- Jason Kershner
- Jimmy Key
- Sean Keys
- Bobby Kielty
- Kevin Kiermaier
- Yusei Kikuchi
- Paul Kilgus
- Isiah Kiner-Falefa
- Nick Kingham
- Alejandro Kirk
- Don Kirkwood
- John Klein
- Mickey Klutts
- Randy Knorr
- Billy Koch
- Tom Koehler
- Bobby Korecky
- Corey Koskie
- George Kottaras
- Erik Kratz
- Jack Kucek
- Craig Kusick

== L ==
- Aaron Laffey
- Junior Lake
- Jake Lamb
- Dennis Lamp
- Ryan Langerhans
- Andy LaRoche
- Chris Latham
- Mat Latos
- Eric Lauer
- Gary Lavelle
- Derek Law
- Tom Lawless
- Casey Lawrence
- Joe Lawrence
- Brett Lawrie
- Rick Leach
- Brandon League
- Luis Leal
- Wil Ledezma
- Chase Lee
- Manuel Lee
- Al Leiter
- Mark Leiter Jr.
- Dave Lemanczyk
- Mark Lemongello
- Patrick Lennon
- Arnold León
- Dominic Leone
- Brian Lesher
- Fred Lewis
- Rommie Lewis
- Cory Lidle
- Kerry Ligtenberg
- Ted Lilly
- Brad Lincoln
- Adam Lind
- Doug Linton
- Francisco Liriano
- Nelson Liriano
- Jesse Litsch
- Brendon Little
- Graeme Lloyd
- Esteban Loaiza
- Adam Loewen
- Joey Loperfido
- Aquilino López
- Felipe López
- Luis Lopez
- Otto López
- Raffy Lopez
- Michael Lorenzen
- Aaron Loup
- Richard Lovelady
- Mark Lowe
- Easton Lucas
- Elvis Luciano
- Eric Ludwick
- Steve Luebber
- Rick Luecken
- Nathan Lukes
- Héctor Luna
- Jordan Luplow
- Brandon Lyon

== M ==
- Bob MacDonald
- Ken Macha
- Mike Macha
- Adam Macko
- Mickey Mahler
- Luke Maile
- Mike Maksudian
- Candy Maldonado
- Alek Manoah
- Fred Manrique
- Joe Mantiply
- Shaun Marcum
- Norberto Martin
- Rudy Martin Jr.
- Russell Martin
- Buck Martinez
- Dave Martinez
- Domingo Martínez
- Orelvis Martínez
- Sandy Martínez
- Jim Mason
- Darin Mastroianni
- Mike Matheny
- Jeff Mathis
- Len Matuszek
- Steven Matz
- Dave Maurer
- John Mayberry
- John Mayberry Jr.
- Tim Mayza
- Lee Mazzilli
- Charles McAdoo
- Mason McCoy
- Mike McCoy
- John McDonald
- Dustin McGowan
- **Fred McGriff**
- Deck McGuire
- Reese McGuire
- Dave McKay
- Billy McKinney
- Joey McLaughlin
- Brian McRae
- Kevin Mench
- Frank Menechino
- Paul Menhart
- Orlando Merced
- Whit Merrifield
- Julian Merryweather
- Chris Michalak
- Spencer Miles
- Kevin Millar
- Dyar Miller
- Justin Miller
- Trever Miller
- Brad Mills
- Brian Milner
- Tommy Milone
- Paul Mirabella
- Randy Moffitt
- Bengie Molina
- José Molina
- **Paul Molitor**
- Raúl Mondesí
- Miguel Montero
- Balor Moore
- Charlie Moore
- Franklin Morales
- Kendrys Morales
- Brian Moran
- Mickey Morandini
- Gabriel Moreno
- Mike Morgan
- **Jack Morris**
- Brandon Morrow
- Lloyd Moseby
- Julio Mosquera
- Chad Mottola
- Rance Mulliniks
- Pete Munro
- Bill Murphy
- Patrick Murphy
- Tom Murphy
- Dale Murray
- Jeff Musselman
- Ron Musselman
- Greg Myers
- Randy Myers

== N ==
- Micheal Nakamura
- Tommy Nance
- Dioner Navarro
- Gift Ngoepe
- Mike Nickeas
- Steve Nicosia
- **Phil Niekro**
- Jayson Nix
- Otis Nixon
- Sean Nolin
- Tim Nordbrook
- Wayne Nordhagen
- Daniel Norris
- José Núñez

== O ==
- Charlie O'Brien
- Seung-hwan Oh
- Tomo Ohka
- Mike Ohlman
- Kazuma Okamoto
- John Olerud
- Al Oliver
- Darren Oliver
- Ray Olmedo
- Jorge Orta
- Ramón Ortiz
- Roberto Osuna
- Willis Otañez
- Lyle Overbay
- Connor Overton

== P ==
- Lance Painter
- Josh Palacios
- Joe Panik
- Thomas Pannone
- Jimmy Paredes
- **Dave Parker**
- Ian Parmley
- Steve Parris
- John Parrish
- Lance Parrish
- Wes Parsons
- Corey Patterson
- David Pauley
- David Paulino
- Joel Payamps
- Steve Pearce
- Nate Pearson
- Cliff Pennington
- Héctor Pérez
- Juan Pérez
- Luis Pérez
- Robert Pérez
- Tomás Pérez
- Robert Person
- Adam Peterson
- Geno Petralli
- Jake Petricka
- David Phelps
- Josh Phelps
- Jason Phillips
- Kyle Phillips
- Tony Phillips
- Kevin Pillar
- Robinson Piña
- Yohendrick Piñango
- Dan Plesac
- Cliff Politte
- Dalton Pompey
- Cody Ponce
- Simon Pond
- Zach Pop
- Hosken Powell
- David Price
- Luke Prokopec
- David Purcey

== Q ==
- Paul Quantrill
- Tom Quinlan
- Guillermo Quiróz

== R ==
- Doug Rader
- Carlos Ramirez
- Neil Ramirez
- Domingo Ramos
- Colby Rasmus
- Rob Rasmussen
- Jon Rauch
- Robbie Ray
- Robert Ray
- Todd Redmond
- Jeremy Reed
- Rob Refsnyder
- Dan Reichert
- Sean Reid-Foley
- Nolan Reimold
- Ben Revere
- Dave Revering
- Jo-Jo Reyes
- José Reyes
- Clayton Richard
- Trevor Richards
- Scott Richmond
- Dave Righetti
- Alex Ríos
- Bill Risley
- Juan Rivera
- Tanner Roark
- Leon Roberts
- Ryan Roberts
- Bob Robertson
- Nick Robertson
- Will Robertson
- Kenny Robinson
- Alan Roden
- José Rodríguez
- Nerio Rodríguez
- Yariel Rodríguez
- Yerry Rodríguez
- Josh Roenicke
- Esmil Rogers
- Jimmy Rogers
- Tyler Rogers
- **Scott Rolen**
- Jordan Romano
- Mike Romano
- Davis Romero
- Ricky Romero
- Sergio Romo
- Phil Roof
- Francisco Rosario
- Mark Ross
- Zac Rosscup
- Chris Rowley
- Randy Ruiz
- B. J. Ryan
- Hyun-jin Ryu
- Marc Rzepczynski

== S ==
- Jarrod Saltalamacchia
- Juan Samuel
- Aaron Sanchez
- Alex Sanchez
- Ali Sánchez
- Jesús Sánchez
- Anthony Sanders
- Nick Sandlin
- Anthony Santander
- Benito Santiago
- Luis Santos
- Sergio Santos
- Tayler Saucedo
- Michael Saunders
- Max Scherzer
- Davis Schneider
- Scott Schoeneweis
- Dick Schofield
- Ken Schrom
- Bo Schultz
- Paxton Schultz
- John Scott
- Marco Scutaro
- Connor Seabold
- David Segui
- Marcus Semien
- Steve Senteney
- Brian Serven
- Scott Service
- Paul Sewald
- Justin Shafer
- Mike Sharperson
- Travis Shaw
- Ron Shepherd
- Matt Shoemaker
- Moisés Sierra
- Rubén Sierra
- José Silva
- Brian Simmons
- Steve Sinclair
- Bill Singer
- Aaron Small
- Chris Smith
- Dwight Smith Jr.
- Jason Smith
- Joe Smith
- Josh Smith
- Kevin Smith
- Mike Smith
- Murphy Smith
- Justin Smoak
- Kirby Snead
- Travis Snider
- Cory Snyder
- Eric Sogard
- Luis Sojo
- Tony Solaita
- Yangervis Solarte
- Joakim Soria
- José Soriano
- Lenyn Sosa
- Glenn Sparkman
- Justin Speier
- Paul Spoljaric
- Ed Sprague
- George Springer
- Randy St. Claire
- Steve Staggs
- Matt Stairs
- Mike Stanley
- Matt Stark
- Michael Stefanic
- Brock Stewart
- Dave Stewart
- Shannon Stewart
- Zach Stewart
- Dave Stieb
- Drew Storen
- Mickey Storey
- Todd Stottlemyre
- Myles Straw
- Ross Stripling
- Marcus Stroman
- Tanyon Sturtze
- Pedro Swann
- Erik Swanson
- Darnell Sweeney

== T ==
- Pat Tabler
- Jameson Taillon
- Brian Tallet
- Jeff Tam
- Raimel Tapia
- Dillon Tate
- Ty Taubenheim
- Beau Taylor
- Mark Teahen
- Rowdy Tellez
- Ryan Tepera
- Nick Tepesch
- Eric Thames
- Curtis Thigpen
- Josh Thole
- **Frank Thomas**
- Andy Thompson
- Lou Thornton
- Trent Thornton
- Corey Thurman
- Ty Tice
- Ricky Tiedemann
- Mike Timlin
- Jackson Todd
- Steve Tolleson
- Yorvit Torrealba
- Héctor Torres
- Josh Towers
- Steve Trachsel
- Devon Travis
- Ricky Trlicek
- Troy Tulowitzki
- Spencer Turnbull
- Justin Turner

== U ==
- Tom Underwood
- Willie Upshaw
- Melvin Upton Jr.
- José Ureña
- Richard Ureña
- Luis Urías
- Gio Urshela

== V ==
- César Valdez
- Merkin Valdez
- Danny Valencia
- Brandon Valenzuela
- Breyvic Valera
- CJ Van Eyk
- Ben Van Ryn
- Louis Varland
- Daulton Varsho
- Andrew Vasquez
- Jorge Velandia
- Otto Vélez
- Pat Venditte
- Jamie Vermilyea
- Carlos Villanueva
- Jonathan Villar
- Frank Viola
- Ozzie Virgil Jr.
- Omar Vizquel
- Daniel Vogelbach
- Austin Voth
- Pete Vuckovich

== W ==
- Neil Wagner
- Will Wagner
- Jacob Waguespack
- Matt Waldron
- Josh Walker
- Pete Walker
- Taijuan Walker
- Dave Wallace
- P. J. Walters
- Chien-Ming Wang
- Duane Ward
- Turner Ward
- Jeff Ware
- John Wasdin
- David Weathers
- Thad Weber
- Mitch Webster
- David Wells
- Greg Wells
- Randy Wells
- Vernon Wells
- Jayson Werth
- Mickey Weston
- Devon White
- Mitch White
- Mark Whiten
- Matt Whiteside
- Dan Whitmer
- Ernie Whitt
- Scott Wiggins
- Ted Wilborn
- Mark Wiley
- Brad Wilkerson
- Kenny Williams
- Matt Williams
- Woody Williams
- Mike Willis
- Frank Wills
- Mookie Wilson
- Tom Wilson
- **Dave Winfield**
- DeWayne Wise
- Shannon Withem
- Kevin Witt
- Brian Wolfe
- Al Woods
- Gary Woods
- Simeon Woods Richardson
- Chris Woodward

== Y ==
- Shun Yamaguchi
- Ryan Yarbrough
- Trey Yesavage

== Z ==
- Víctor Zambrano
- Gregg Zaun
- T. J. Zeuch
- Bradley Zimmer
- Eddie Zosky
