= Carlos Tosca =

Cuban baseball coach & manager (born 1953)

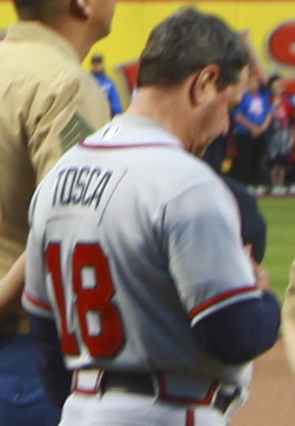
- Tosca with the Atlanta Braves in 2013
- Manager / Coach
- Born: September 29, 1953 (age 72); Pinar del Río, Cuba

MLB statistics
- Games managed: 382
- Win–loss record: 191–191
- Winning %: .500
- Stats at Baseball Reference
- Managerial record at Baseball Reference

Teams
- As manager: Toronto Blue Jays (2002–2004); As coach: Arizona Diamondbacks (1998–2000); Toronto Blue Jays (2002); Arizona Diamondbacks (2005–2006); Florida Marlins (2007–2010); Atlanta Braves (2011–2016)

Carlos Tosca (born September 29, 1953) is a Cuban former professional baseball manager and coach in Major League Baseball (MLB).

He was the manager of the Toronto Blue Jays from 2002 to 2004. He succeeded Buck Martinez on June 3, 2002, served the entire 2003 season, then was replaced by John Gibbons on August 8, 2004, after compiling a 191–191 win–loss record (.500).

Tosca is a graduate of the University of South Florida. He did not play professional baseball, but became a coach at the high school level after his graduation. In 1978, he entered pro baseball as a coach in the Short Season-A New York–Penn League.

== Biography ==
Tosca managed in the farm systems of the New York Yankees, Kansas City Royals, Florida Marlins and Atlanta Braves for 17 seasons between 1980 and 2001. He was the first manager in the history of the Portland Sea Dogs of the Double-A Eastern League, serving as their pilot from 1994 to 1996. He has managed at the highest level of minor league baseball with the Triple-A Charlotte Knights (1997) and Richmond Braves (2001), and was the bench coach on Buck Showalter's staff during the first three MLB seasons (1998–2000) in Arizona Diamondbacks history.

Tosca was hired as the third base coach of the Blue Jays for the 2002 season by the club's recently appointed general manager, J. P. Ricciardi. When Toronto started poorly (20–33, .377) under Martinez—who had been hired by former GM Gord Ash—Ricciardi replaced the incumbent manager with Tosca. Over the final two-thirds of the campaign, Tosca led the Jays to a 58–51 (.523) mark and a third-place finish in the American League East Division. Tosca then produced another winning record (86–76, .531) and third-place finish in 2003. But in 2004, the Jays won only 47 of their first 111 games (.423) and were in fifth place in their division when Tosca was relieved of command by Ricciardi. The Jays finished the campaign at 67–94 (.416).

After returning to the Diamondbacks in 2005–2006 to coach third base under manager Bob Melvin, Tosca was the bench coach for the Marlins under Fredi González from 2007 to June 22, 2010.

When González was hired to replace Bobby Cox as the manager of the Braves following the 2010 season, Tosca was hired to serve as the Braves' new bench coach. He managed the Braves on May 10 and 11, 2013 due to González' daughter's college graduation.

On May 17, 2016, both Tosca and González were dismissed from the Atlanta Braves.

In February 2019, Tosca was named as the Field Coach for the GCL Orioles.

== Managerial record ==
As of September 28, 2015

| Team | Year | Regular season | | | | | Postseason | | | |
| Team | Year | Games | Won | Lost | Win % | Finish | Won | Lost | Win % | Result |
|---|---|---|---|---|---|---|---|---|---|---|
| TOR | 2002 | 109 | 58 | 51 | .532 | 3rd in AL East | – | – | – | – |
| TOR | 2003 | 162 | 86 | 76 | .531 | 3rd in AL East | – | – | – | – |
| TOR | 2004 | 111 | 47 | 64 | .423 | fired | – | – | – | – |
| Total | | 382 | 191 | 191 | .500 | | 0 | 0 | – | |

== Personal ==
Tosca has an identical twin brother named Rick.

Managerial/coaching positions
| Preceded by Franchise inactive Jack Gillis | Gulf Coast League Yankees manager 1980–1982; 1985 | Succeeded by Jack Gillis; Fred Ferrreira |
| Preceded by Doug Holmquist | Greensboro Hornets manager 1983–1984 | Succeeded by Doug Camilli |
| Preceded by Luis Silverio | Gulf Coast Royals manager 1988–1990 | Succeeded by Bob Herold |
| Preceded by Brian Poldberg | Baseball City Royals manager 1991 | Succeeded by Ron Johnson |
| Preceded by Franchise created | Gulf Coast Marlins manager 1992 | Succeeded by Jim Hendry |
| Preceded by Joel Youngblood | Kane County Cougars manager 1993 | Succeeded by Lynn Jones |
| Preceded by Franchise created | Portland Sea Dogs manager 1994–1996 | Succeeded by Fredi González |
| Preceded by Sal Rende | Charlotte Knights manager 1997 | Succeeded by Fredi González |
| Preceded by Franchise created | Arizona Diamondbacks bench coach 1998–2000 | Succeeded by Bob Melvin |
| Preceded by Randy Ingle | Richmond Braves manager 2001 | Succeeded by Fredi González |
| Preceded by Terry Bevington | Toronto Blue Jays third base coach 2002 | Succeeded by Brian Butterfield |
| Preceded by Glenn Sherlock | Arizona Diamondbacks third base coach 2005–2006 | Succeeded by Chip Hale |
| Preceded by Gary Tuck | Florida Marlins bench coach 2007–2010 | Succeeded by Brandon Hyde |
| Preceded by Chino Cadahia | Atlanta Braves bench coach 2011–2016 | Succeeded by Terry Pendleton |
