= Brian Butterfield =

American baseball coach (born 1958)

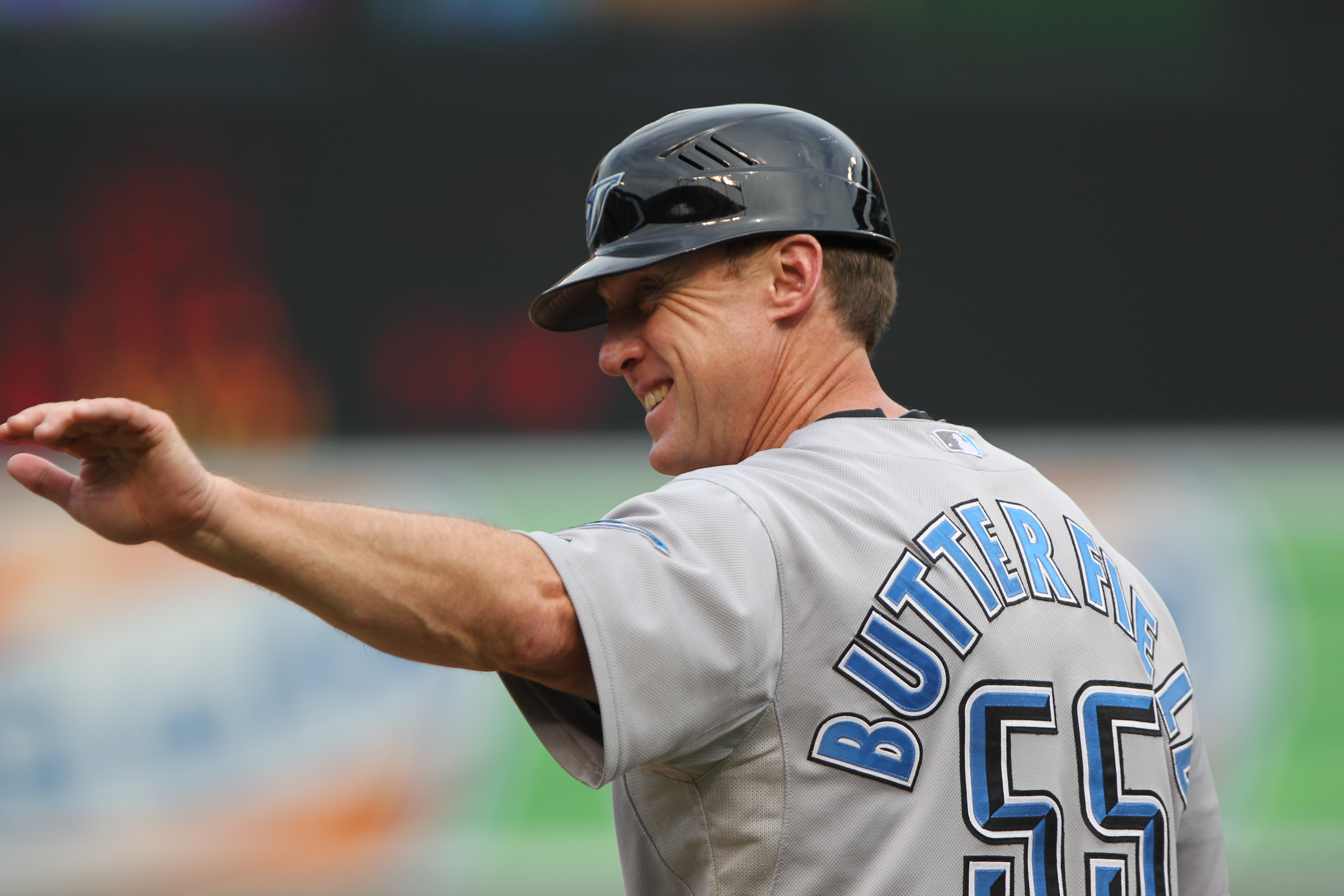
- Butterfield as third base coach for the Toronto Blue Jays in 2011
- Third base coach
- Born: March 9, 1958 (age 68); Bangor, Maine, U.S.
- Bats: Switch Throws: Right
- Stats at Baseball Reference

Teams
- As coach: New York Yankees (1994–1995); Arizona Diamondbacks (1998–2000); Toronto Blue Jays (2002–2012); Boston Red Sox (2013–2017); Chicago Cubs (2018–2019); Los Angeles Angels (2020–2021)

Career highlights and awards
- World Series Champion (2013)

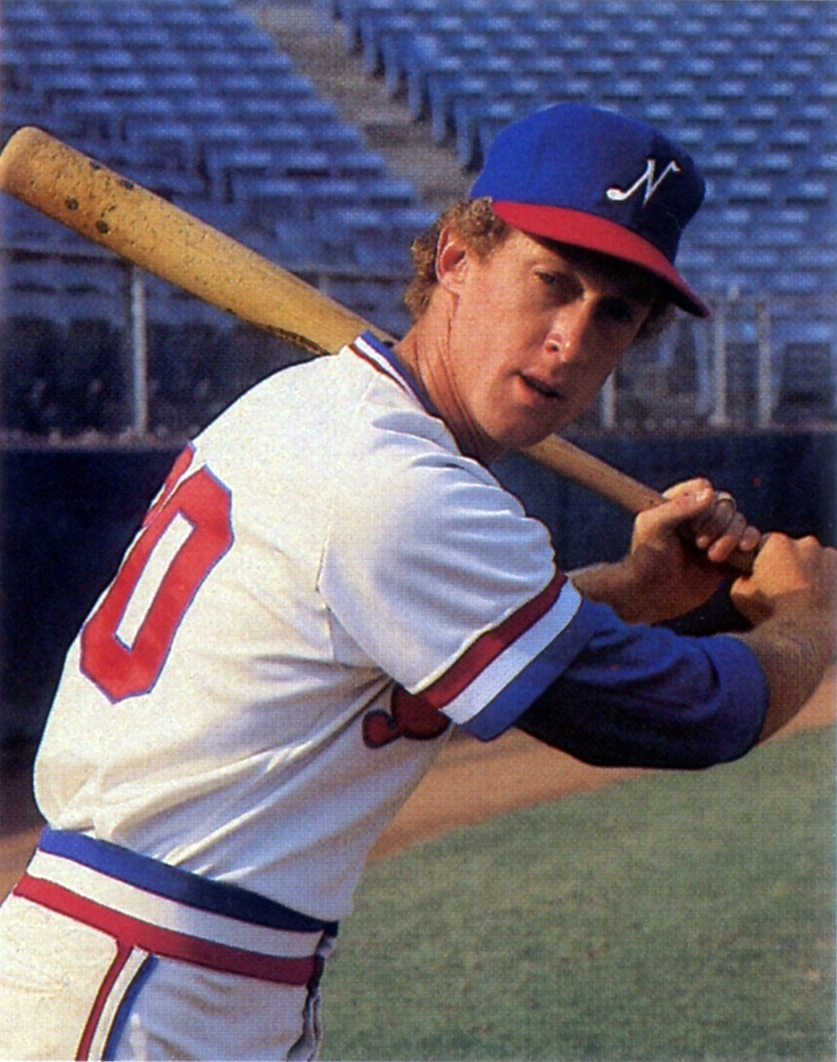
Butterfield with the Nashville Sounds in 1982

Brian James Butterfield (born March 9, 1958) is an American professional baseball coach, and a former minor league player, manager and infield instructor. He has coached for the New York Yankees, Arizona Diamondbacks, Toronto Blue Jays, Boston Red Sox, Chicago Cubs, and Los Angeles Angels of Major League Baseball (MLB).

== Early years ==
Born in Bangor, Maine, Butterfield is the son of the late Jack Butterfield, a longtime college baseball coach who was vice-president of player development and scouting for the New York Yankees from 1977 until his death in November 1979. The younger Butterfield attended the University of Maine, where his father was head baseball coach from 1957 to 1974, and still resides in Orono, Maine. He also attended Valencia Community College and graduated from Florida Southern College, where he earned a Bachelor of Arts degree in 1980. In 1976, he played collegiate summer baseball for the Wareham Gatemen of the Cape Cod Baseball League, where he helped lead the team to the league title. He is the nephew of College Football Hall of Fame Coach Jim Butterfield.

== Playing career ==
During his active career, Butterfield was a second baseman in the Yankees' minor league system, playing for five seasons (1979–83) and batting .249 with one home run in 397 games played, largely at the full-season Class A level. A switch hitter who threw right-handed, he was listed at 6 feet (1.8 m) tall and 175 pounds (79 kg).

== Early coaching career ==
Butterfield's coaching career began during his professional playing days as a part-time assistant at Florida Southern (1979) and Eckerd College (1980–81). After his playing career ended, he became a roving infield instructor in the Yankees' organization, then a coach at different levels of the Bombers' farm system. He also managed the Short Season-A Oneonta Yankees (1989) and Class A Greensboro Hornets (1990) and Fort Lauderdale Yankees (1992), before joining the Major League staff of Yankees' manager Buck Showalter as first-base coach in 1994–95.

After he was replaced by Joe Torre as the Yankees' pilot after the 1995 season, Showalter was promptly named the first manager of the expansion Arizona Diamondbacks, set to begin play during the 1998 National League season. Hired with two seasons to prepare for the team's debut, Showalter brought several Yankees' instructors with him to Phoenix, including Butterfield, to implement the Diamondbacks' player development program. Butterfield was named roving minor league infield instructor in 1996 and then, in 1997, manager of the D-backs' Rookie-level team, the Arizona League Diamondbacks. Butterfield then became the first third-base coach in the Diamondbacks' Major League history, serving under Showalter in 1998–2000.

After Showalter's firing following the 2000 season, Butterfield returned to the Yankees as a minor league manager, helming the Tampa Yankees of the Class A Florida State League (2001) and beginning 2002 as manager of the Triple-A Columbus Clippers of the International League. However, the Clippers got off to a poor, 12–25 start and Butterfield was fired on May 16, 2002.

Less than three weeks later, on June 3, 2002, Carlos Tosca, a coaching colleague of Butterfield's with the Diamondbacks, was appointed manager of the Toronto Blue Jays. He hired Butterfield as his third-base coach, beginning a 10 1/2-year tenure for Butterfield in Toronto. During that time, Butterfield served under four different Blue Jay managers.

== Infield coaching career ==
Butterfield has earned a reputation throughout baseball as a premier infield coach. Orlando Hudson, who was recognized as one of the best defensive second baseman in baseball during his 11-year MLB career, and winner of the Gold Glove Award in 2005 and 2006, has stated that Butterfield deserves immense credit for making him the defensive player he is. Under Butterfield's tutelage Aaron Hill, a shortstop by trade, became an above-average defensive second baseman. Butterfield worked very closely with the young and talented Blue Jays third baseman Brett Lawrie.

It was announced on September 30, 2007, that Butterfield would be the bench coach for the Blue Jays in 2008, replacing Ernie Whitt. On October 30, 2009, it was announced that Butterfield would once again be the Blue Jays' third base coach for the 2010 season.

During the 2010 off-season, Butterfield was one of four finalists for the Blue Jays' managerial job, along with John Farrell, DeMarlo Hale, and Sandy Alomar Jr. Two years later, after Farrell's return to the Red Sox as their manager for 2013, Butterfield was again a finalist for the Jays' managerial opening.

When John Gibbons got the Blue Jays' job, Butterfield joined Farrell and the Red Sox on October 30, 2012, as third-base coach. He served through the Red Sox' 2013 World Series championship season, coaching third base, positioning the infielders defensively, working with young players Will Middlebrooks and Xander Bogaerts, and helping to convert Mike Napoli from catcher to first baseman. Butterfield was rehired for 2014 with the rest of Farrell's staff after the World Series triumph, and remained the team's third-base and infield coach through October 26, 2017, when, two weeks after Farrell's firing, Butterfield took a similar job on the staff of the Chicago Cubs.

Butterfield was hired by the Los Angeles Angels as their third base coach prior to the 2020 season. The Angels dismissed Butterfield after the 2021 season. On January 21, 2022, it was reported that Butterfield was denied a role on the New York Mets staff for his refusal to receive the COVID-19 vaccine.

Sporting positions
| Preceded by Frank Howard | New York Yankees first base coach 1994–1995 | Succeeded by José Cardenal |
| Preceded by Franchise created | Arizona Diamondbacks third base coach 1998–2000 | Succeeded by Chris Speier |
| Preceded by Trey Hillman | Columbus Clippers manager 2002 | Succeeded by Frank Howard |
| Preceded by Carlos Tosca; Nick Leyva | Toronto Blue Jays third base coach 2002–2007; 2010–2012 | Succeeded by Marty Pevey; Luis Rivera |
| Preceded by Ernie Whitt | Toronto Blue Jays bench coach 2008–2009 | Succeeded by Nick Leyva |
| Preceded by Jerry Royster | Boston Red Sox third base coach 2013–2017 | Succeeded by Carlos Febles |
| Preceded by Gary Jones | Chicago Cubs third base coach 2018–2019 | Succeeded by Will Venable |
| Preceded by Mike Gallego | Los Angeles Angels third base coach 2020-2021 | Succeeded by Phil Nevin |
