= Pedro Swann =

American baseball player (born 1970)

Delaware State Hornets
- Outfielder / Coach
- Born: October 27, 1970 (age 55); Wilmington, Delaware, U.S.
- Batted: Left Threw: Right

MLB debut
- September 9, 2000, for the Atlanta Braves

Last MLB appearance
- September 27, 2003, for the Baltimore Orioles

MLB statistics
- Batting average: .143
- Home runs: 1
- Runs batted in: 3
- Stats at Baseball Reference

Teams
- Atlanta Braves (2000); Toronto Blue Jays (2002); Baltimore Orioles (2003)

Pedro Maurice Swann (born October 27, 1970) is an American former outfielder who spent parts of three seasons in Major League Baseball (MLB) with the Atlanta Braves (2000), Toronto Blue Jays (2002) and Baltimore Orioles (2003). Swann spent 16 seasons in the minor leagues and played 25 games in the majors, making his big league debut at the age of 29. Swann has also coached in the college and independent baseball ranks.

== Playing career ==
Swann was drafted out of Delaware State University in the 26th round of the 1991 Major League Baseball draft by the Atlanta Braves. He spent 13 seasons in the minors before making his debut for the Braves in 2000, striking out in both of his at-bats that season. He played all of 2001 with the Braves' Triple-A affiliate in Richmond and became a free agent at the end of the season. On February 14, 2002, Swann signed with the Toronto Blue Jays and spent most of the season in Triple-A, but did play 13 games for the Blue Jays.

For 2003, he signed with the Baltimore Orioles and again spent a few games in the majors. His most notable performance as a major leaguer occurred at Camden Yards on September 18, 2003. An attempt to avoid Hurricane Isabel by changing the game's start time from 7:05 pm (ET) to 12:35 pm proved futile as the contest was played entirely in a downpour. With the score tied at one, Swann opened the bottom of the fifth inning with a double off Mike Mussina. When Brian Roberts hit a one-out single to left field, Orioles third-base coach Tom Trebelhorn had initially waved Swann home. He abruptly put up the stop sign when left fielder Hideki Matsui quickly threw the ball to third baseman Aaron Boone. Swann, who was too far past third base, got caught in a rundown and was tagged out. When the inning ended with the Orioles failing to score a run, the match was suspended and replayed in its entirety eight days later on September 26 as part of a twi-night doubleheader at Yankee Stadium. The Orioles would have had a 2–1 victory had Swann successfully crossed home plate because the game became official upon the completion of the fifth inning.

He became a free agent after the 2004 season and signed a minor league contract with the Cincinnati Reds for the 2005 season. In 127 games for Triple-A Louisville, he hit .285 with 18 home runs and 85 Runs batted in. In 2006, he played in Double-A and Triple-A for the Philadelphia Phillies, with the Tabasco Olmecs in the Mexican League, and Camden Riversharks of the independent Atlantic League. In 2007, he again played for the Double-A and Triple-A teams and announced his retirement before the start of the 2008 season.

== Coaching career ==
Pedro Swann operates Pro Swing Sports Academy, an indoor training facility in Middletown, Delaware. Also on the staff are two other former major leaguers, pitcher Dwayne Henry and Carlos Mendez, a former first baseman and catcher. Swann offers hitting lessons, while Dwayne gives pitching and Carlos catching instruction.

Prior to the 2013 season, Swann was hired as the head baseball coach of the Maryland-Eastern Shore Hawks. He left after the 2014 season to become the bench coach for the Camden Riversharks.

=== Head coaching records ===
Below is a table of Swann's yearly records as an NCAA head baseball coach.

Record table
Season	Team	Overall	Conference	Standing	Postseason
Maryland Eastern Shore Hawks (Mid-Eastern Athletic Conference) (2013–present)
2013	Maryland Eastern Shore	8-45	4-20	4th (Northern)	MEAC Tournament
2014	Maryland Eastern Shore	13-35	8-16	4th (Northern)	MEAC Tournament
Maryland Eastern Shore:		21-80	12-36		
Delaware State Hornets (Northeast Conference) (2025–present)
2025	Delaware State	7–34	6–24	T–9th	
2026	Delaware State	8–42	8–25	T–11th	
Delaware State:		15–76	14–49		
Total:		36-156			
National champion Postseason invitational champion Conference regular season champion Conference regular season and conference tournament champion Division regular season champion Division regular season and conference tournament champion Conference tournament champion

== Film career ==
Swann played the role of Juan Vasquez in the 1999 film For the Love of the Game starring Kevin Costner.
