= Félix Heredia =

Dominican baseball player (born 1975)

- Pitcher
- Born: June 18, 1975 (age 50); Santa Cruz de Barahona, Dominican Republic
- Batted: Left Threw: Left

MLB debut
- August 9, 1996, for the Florida Marlins

Last MLB appearance
- April 18, 2005, for the New York Mets

MLB statistics
- Win–loss record: 28–19
- Earned run average: 4.42
- Strikeouts: 351
- Stats at Baseball Reference

Former teams
- Florida Marlins (1996–1998); Chicago Cubs (1998–2001); Toronto Blue Jays (2002); Cincinnati Reds (2003); New York Yankees (2003–2004); New York Mets (2005)

Career highlights and awards
- World Series champion (1997)

Félix Heredia Pérez (born June 18, 1975) is a Dominican former Major League Baseball relief pitcher. On October 18, 2005, he became the 11th MLB player to be suspended for testing positive for steroids. He is also known as "El Gato Flaco" (Skinny Cat in Spanish) and, "The Run Fairy" (a nickname sarcastically lampooning his poor performances in the latter part of his career).

Heredia attended Escuela Dominical in Barahona. He was signed as a free agent by the Florida Marlins in 1993 and made his major league debut with the Marlins on August 9, 1995. Heredia went on to pitch for the Chicago Cubs and Toronto Blue Jays before having his best season in 2003 with the Cincinnati Reds and New York Yankees. That year, he was 5–3 with one save and a 2.69 ERA in 69 relief appearances. However, his performance declined rapidly in 2004 with the Yankees, who traded him to the New York Mets for Mike Stanton prior to the 2005 season. However, he made just three appearances with the Mets in 2005 before going on the disabled list with an aneurysm in his left shoulder in June, and he missed the rest of the season.

The following off-season, he signed with Arizona, but was released during spring training. Four days later, Heredia signed with the Cleveland Indians, appearing in eight games for their Triple-A affiliate, the Buffalo Bisons, before being released on May 12. On December 16, 2006, the Detroit Tigers signed him to a minor league deal, but despite a 2.00 ERA in spring training, Heredia was released.

Heredia is married with three children and resides in Santo Domingo, Dominican Republic.

== See also ==
- List of sportspeople sanctioned for doping offences
