= Luke Prokopec =

Australian baseball player (born 1978)

- Pitcher
- Born: 23 February 1978 (age 47); Blackwood, South Australia
- Batted: Left Threw: Right

MLB debut
- 4 September, 2000, for the Los Angeles Dodgers

Last MLB appearance
- 23 August, 2002, for the Toronto Blue Jays

MLB statistics
- Win–loss record: 11–17
- Earned run average: 5.30
- Strikeouts: 144
- Stats at Baseball Reference

Teams
- Los Angeles Dodgers (2000–2001); Toronto Blue Jays (2002)

Kenneth Luke Prokopec (born 23 February 1978) is an Australian former professional baseball right-handed pitcher. He played in Major League Baseball (MLB) for the Los Angeles Dodgers and Toronto Blue Jays.

While with the Dodgers in 2000 and 2001, the tandem of Prokopec and fellow Australian Jeff Williams gained considerable popularity in the Los Angeles area. However, the attention was short lived, as both moved on to other franchises. Prokopec was traded to Toronto on 13 December 2001 with Chad Ricketts in exchange for César Izturis and Paul Quantrill.

Prokopec's 2002 tenure with the Toronto Blue Jays was unsuccessful, as he went 2-9 and sustained a labral tear injury late in the season. In short order, the Blue Jays granted Prokopec free agency in October 2002. The Los Angeles Dodgers then signed him that November, but kept him off their 40-man roster, and the Cincinnati Reds subsequently claimed Prokopec from Los Angeles in the Rule 5 Draft in December. However, Prokopec would never throw another pitch (in either the majors or the minors) for any organization—further labral problems occurred, forcing Prokopec's early retirement from professional baseball at the age of 24.

Prokopec returned to Australia, and in 2013 was a baseball instructor for the Queensland Academy of Sport in Brisbane.

== Pitching style ==
Prokopec threw an 88–96 MPH four-seam fastball, an 82–86 MPH slider, an 81–83 MPH changeup, and a 75–77 MPH curveball.
