= Tom Wilson (2000s catcher) =

American baseball player (born 1970)

- Catcher
- Born: December 19, 1970 (age 55); Fullerton, California, U.S.
- Batted: Right Threw: Right

MLB debut
- May 19, 2001, for the Oakland Athletics

Last MLB appearance
- October 10, 2004, for the Los Angeles Dodgers

MLB statistics
- Batting average: .253
- Home runs: 15
- Runs batted in: 76
- Stats at Baseball Reference

Teams
- Oakland Athletics (2001); Toronto Blue Jays (2002–2003); New York Mets (2004); Los Angeles Dodgers (2004)

Thomas Leroy Wilson (born December 19, 1970) is a former professional baseball player. He played all or parts of four seasons in Major League Baseball, primarily as a catcher.

== Career ==
Drafted by the New York Yankees in the 23rd round of the 1990 Major League Baseball draft, Wilson made his major league debut with the Oakland Athletics on May 19, 2001. He played nine games for the Athletics, and was traded in early 2002 to the Toronto Blue Jays for Mike Kremblas. He spent two seasons on the Blue Jays, playing 96 games each season. The following season, he played a few games with the Mets, and later the Dodgers, in his final major league season.

The highlight of Wilson's career came on October 5, 2004. As a member of the Los Angeles Dodgers, Wilson hit a solo home run in the National League Division Series against St. Louis Cardinals closer Jason Isringhausen. With this at bat being his only postseason plate appearance, Wilson boasts a 1.000 career postseason batting average with a 4.000 slugging percentage. This at bat was also the last official at bat of Wilson's major league career.

On December 21, 2004, Wilson became a free agent. He was signed to a minor league contract by the Colorado Rockies, but spent the entire season with their Triple-A affiliate, the Colorado Springs Sky Sox. A free agent again prior to the 2006 season, Wilson played for the Triple-A affiliate of the Florida Marlins, the Albuquerque Isotopes. Wilson compiled a career .253 batting average with 15 home runs and 76 runs batted in in 554 at-bats.

Following his retirement, Wilson became a scout for the New York Yankees.
