= Corey Thurman =

American baseball player (born 1978)

- Pitcher
- Born: November 5, 1978 (age 47); Augusta, Georgia, U.S.
- Batted: Right Threw: Right

MLB debut
- April 5, 2002, for the Toronto Blue Jays

Last MLB appearance
- August 13, 2003, for the Toronto Blue Jays

MLB statistics
- Win–loss record: 3–4
- Earned run average: 4.75
- Strikeouts: 67
- Stats at Baseball Reference

Teams
- Toronto Blue Jays (2002–2003)

Corey Lamar Thurman (born November 5, 1978) is an American former professional baseball pitcher. He played two seasons in Major League Baseball for the Toronto Blue Jays, and also played for the York Revolution of the independent Atlantic League.

== Career ==
Thurman was selected by the Kansas City Royals in 4th round of 1996 Major League Baseball draft. He played his first professional season with their Rookie league GCL Royals in 1996. In 2007, he played for the Milwaukee Brewers Double-A affiliate, the Huntsville Stars. He signed with the York Revolution of the independent Atlantic League for the 2008 season and re-signed with them for the 2009 season. In December 2009, Thurman married Angela Day in York, Pennsylvania. Said Thurman, "I met a girl who loves to watch SportsCenter--what else can you do?"

Thurman was released by the York Revolution on May 25, 2015; after five appearances on the season, Thurman had an 8.23 ERA over 19.2 innings. Thurman left the Revolution as the team's all-time leader in wins (66), games started (180), quality starts (60), innings pitched (980.1), and strikeouts (667).

== Pitching style ==
Thurman threw an 88–91 MPH four-seam fastball, an excellent changeup with good location at around 80 MPH, as well as a 75–77 MPH curveball and an 81–83 MPH slider.
