= Mike Smith (2000s pitcher) =

American baseball player (born 1977)

- Pitcher
- Born: September 19, 1977 (age 48); Norwood, Massachusetts, U.S.
- Batted: Right Threw: Right

MLB debut
- April 26, 2002, for the Toronto Blue Jays

Last appearance
- August 6, 2006, for the Minnesota Twins

MLB statistics
- Win–loss record: 0–3
- Earned run average: 7.04
- Strikeouts: 17

CPBL statistics
- Win–loss record: 7–7
- Earned run average: 5.45
- Strikeouts: 72
- Stats at Baseball Reference

Teams
- Toronto Blue Jays (2002); Minnesota Twins (2006); Brother Elephants (2009)

Michael Anthony Smith (born September 19, 1977) is an American former professional baseball pitcher who played for the Toronto Blue Jays and Minnesota Twins of Major League Baseball (MLB), and the Brother Elephants of the Chinese Professional Baseball League (CPBL).

== Career ==
Smith played college baseball for the University of Richmond. In 1999, he played collegiate summer baseball with the Hyannis Mets of the Cape Cod Baseball League. He was selected by the Toronto Blue Jays in the 5th round of the 2000 MLB draft. He played in 14 games for the Blue Jays in 2002, starting six and posting an earned run average of 6.62. The Minnesota Twins acquired Smith from the Philadelphia Phillies during the 2005-2006 offseason, but he was not on the Twins' 40-man roster. However, inconsistent pitching from Scott Baker and Boof Bonser and shoulder problems for Brad Radke prompted the Twins to call him up to the major leagues on August 2, 2006.

Smith signed with the York Revolution of the Atlantic League for the 2009 season, but left to pitch in Asia. He plays for the Brother Elephants team in Taiwan's Chinese Professional Baseball League (CPBL).

For the 2010 season, Mike played for the Brockton Rox of the Can-Am. He led the Cam-Am in wins and ERA, going 12–3 with a 2.87 ERA in 125.1 innings. He was named to the Cam-Am All-Star Team, along with teammates Melvin Falu, Mike Wlodarczyk, and Chris Grossman. The four Rox players were the most named to the All-Star team out of any other team in the Can-Am.
