= Justin Miller (baseball, born 1977) =

American baseball player (1977–2013)

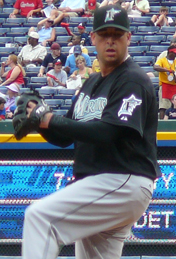
- Miller with the Florida Marlins in 2007
- Pitcher
- Born: August 27, 1977; Torrance, California, U.S.
- Died: June 26, 2013 (aged 35); Palm Harbor, Florida, U.S.
- Batted: Right Threw: Right

Professional debut
- MLB: April 12, 2002, for the Toronto Blue Jays
- NPB: 2006, for the Chiba Lotte Marines

Last appearance
- NPB: 2006, for the Chiba Lotte Marines
- MLB: July 18, 2010, for the Los Angeles Dodgers

MLB statistics
- Win–loss record: 24–14
- Earned run average: 4.82
- Strikeouts: 300

NPB statistics
- Win–loss record: 0–1
- Earned run average: 10.80
- Strikeouts: 11
- Stats at Baseball Reference

Teams
- Toronto Blue Jays (2002, 2004–2005); Chiba Lotte Marines (2006); Florida Marlins (2007–2008); San Francisco Giants (2009); Los Angeles Dodgers (2010)

Justin Mark Miller (August 27, 1977 – June 26, 2013) was an American professional baseball pitcher. He played in Major League Baseball (MLB) for the Toronto Blue Jays, Florida Marlins, San Francisco Giants, and Los Angeles Dodgers. He also played in Nippon Professional Baseball (NPB) for the Chiba Lotte Marines. Miller was the inspiration for the "Justin Miller rule" requiring pitchers with arm tattoos to wear long-sleeved shirts.

== Amateur career ==
Miller played in the 1992 Little League World Series with Torrance and played high school baseball with Torrance High School, where he was first team All-State and Conference player of the year as a Senior. He attended Los Angeles Harbor College and was a Junior College All-American in 1997.

== Professional career ==
=== Colorado Rockies ===
Miller was drafted by the Colorado Rockies in the 5th round of the 1997 MLB draft and made his professional debut with the short-season Class A Portland Rockies, helping them win the Northwest League championship. He then moved up to the Asheville Tourists (Class A) in 1998 and the Salem Avalanche (Class A Advanced) in 1999.

=== Oakland Athletics ===
Miller was traded by the Rockies to the Oakland Athletics on December 13, 1999 (along with Henry Blanco) for Scott Karl and Jeff Cirillo. He spent most of 2000 and 2001 with the AAA Sacramento River Cats of the Pacific Coast League.

=== Toronto Blue Jays ===
Miller was traded to the Toronto Blue Jays on December 7, 2001 (along with Eric Hinske) for Billy Koch. He made his Major League debut on April 12, 2002, for the Blue Jays against the Tampa Bay Devil Rays. He pitched 2 2/3 innings of relief, hitting the first two batters he faced, and allowing a total of four hits and one run. He made his first ML start on April 27 against the Anaheim Angels, but lasted only 3 2/3 innings while giving up four runs. He appeared in 25 games with the Blue Jays in 2002, starting 18 of them and finishing 9–5 with a 5.54 ERA. He missed most of the 2003 season with a shoulder injury and returned in 2004, when he appeared in 19 games for the Blue Jays (15 starts) and went 3–4 with a 6.06 ERA. He then spent most of 2005 with the AAA Syracuse SkyChiefs, appearing in only one game for the Blue Jays.

=== Tampa Bay Devil Rays/Chiba Lotte Marines ===
He signed as a minor league free agent with the Tampa Bay Devil Rays in 2006 and appeared in five games for their AAA affiliate, the Durham Bulls. He was then released and played for the Chiba Lotte Marines in Japan, pitching in twelve games.

=== Florida Marlins ===
After a three-game stint with the Philadelphia Phillies AAA affiliate, the Ottawa Lynx, Miller signed a minor-league contract with the Florida Marlins.

He started the season at Triple-A Albuquerque and was recalled by the Marlins on May 19, 2007, after an injury to Ricky Nolasco. Although Miller had been a starter in previous seasons, the Marlins used him to fill a relief role, with former closer Byung-hyun Kim taking Nolasco's spot in the starting rotation. The Marlins released him on October 3, 2008.

=== San Francisco Giants ===
On November 1, 2008, the San Francisco Giants signed him to a minor league contract with an invitation to spring training. After an injury to Joe Martinez, he was added to the Giants roster and appeared in 44 games out of the bullpen (long relief), 3-3, with a 3.18 ERA, for the Giants in 2009.

=== Los Angeles Dodgers ===
Miller was signed to a minor league contract which included an invitation to spring training by the Los Angeles Dodgers on December 4, 2009. He was assigned to the Triple-A Albuquerque Isotopes to start the season. His contract was purchased by the Dodgers on May 27. He appeared in 19 games with the Dodgers, compiling a 4.44 ERA. He was designated for assignment on July 23. He cleared waivers and was reassigned to Albuquerque. In 32 games for the Isotopes in 2010, he had a 1.95 ERA. He was granted free agency on October 6.

=== Seattle Mariners ===
On November 17, 2010, Miller signed a minor league contract with the Seattle Mariners. He was released by Seattle April 25, 2011.

=== Texas Rangers ===
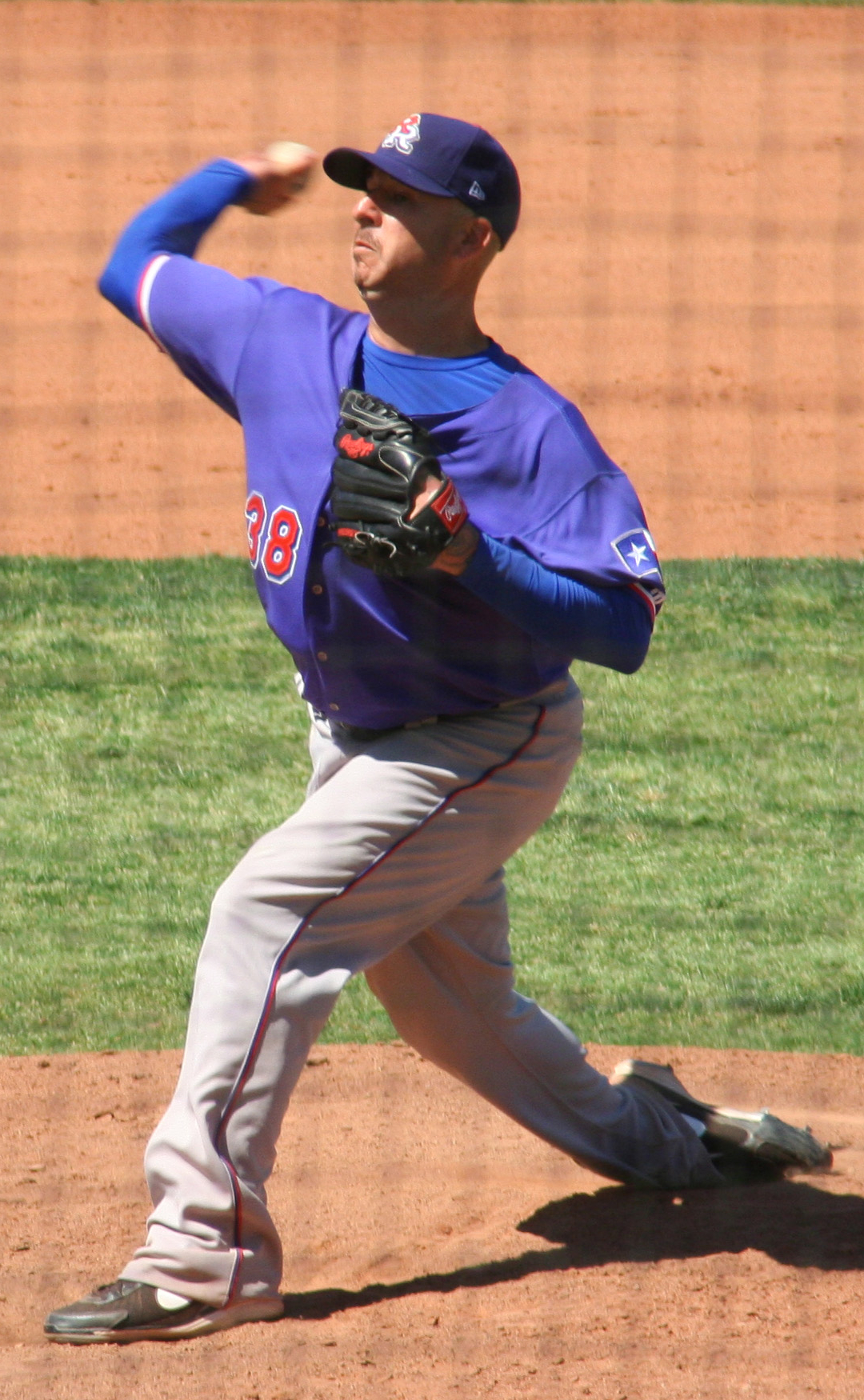
Miller pitching for the Round Rock Express, Triple-A affiliates of the Texas Rangers, in 2011.

Miller signed a minor league contract with the Texas Rangers April 29. He was later released by the Rangers on June 6, 2011.

=== Return to Dodgers ===
On July 4, 2011, Miller signed a minor league contract with the Los Angeles Dodgers. He pitched in three games for the Albuquerque Isotopes, walking four and allowing two runs in 1 2/3 innings for a 10.80 ERA. He was released on July 25.

== Death ==
Miller was found dead in his Palm Harbor home on June 26, 2013. A cause of death was not announced. Miller had two sons, and had been married to Jessica for 15 years.

== Tattoos ==
Miller was known for his many tattoos. He got his first tattoo at 16 years old and, in 2004, said he hoped to have his whole body covered eventually. In a move sometimes called the "Justin Miller Rule", Major League Baseball told Miller that he had to wear a long-sleeved shirt under his jersey whenever he was playing because hitters complained about being "distracted" by Miller's sleeve tattoos.
