= Pasqual Coco =

Dominican baseball player (born 1977)

- Pitcher
- Born: September 24, 1977 (age 48); Santo Domingo, Dominican Republic
- Batted: Right Threw: Right

MLB debut
- July 17, 2000, for the Toronto Blue Jays

Last MLB appearance
- April 14, 2002, for the Toronto Blue Jays

MLB statistics
- Win–loss record: 1–1
- Earned run average: 6.05
- Strikeouts: 11
- Stats at Baseball Reference

Teams
- Toronto Blue Jays (2000–2002)

Pasqual Coco (born September 24, 1977) is a Dominican former pitcher in Major League Baseball. Coco pitched parts of three seasons with the Toronto Blue Jays from 2000 to 2002.

He was released by the Blue Jays after an incident during spring training 2003, in which he stole money from his roommate, minor league pitcher Diego Markwell. Coco admitted he took the money, apologized (although he said he had "good reason" for taking it), and returned it. No criminal charges were laid. The Jays nevertheless released him, citing his breach of team regulations.

Coco subsequently spent time in the Milwaukee Brewers and Montreal Expos organizations, as well as in the Mexican League, but never returned to the majors.

== Pitching style ==
Coco was known for throwing a 90–92 mph fastball and an 81–83 mph lively palmball.
