= Joe Lawrence =

American baseball player (born 1977)

- Second baseman
- Born: February 13, 1977 (age 48); Lake Charles, Louisiana, U.S.
- Batted: Right Threw: Right

MLB debut
- April 8, 2002, for the Toronto Blue Jays

Last MLB appearance
- July 22, 2002, for the Toronto Blue Jays

MLB statistics
- Batting average: .180
- Home runs: 2
- Runs batted in: 15
- Stats at Baseball Reference

Teams
- Toronto Blue Jays (2002)

Joseph Dudley Lawrence (born February 13, 1977) is an American former professional baseball player. Playing in Major League Baseball, Lawrence played in 55 games for the Toronto Blue Jays in 2002, mostly as a second baseman.

== Biography ==
=== Early life ===
Joe Lawrence was born Joseph Dudley Lawrence in Lake Charles, Louisiana on February 13, 1977.

=== Baseball career ===
Lawrence played for only one team during his short tenure of 55 games in Major League Baseball in 2002, the Toronto Blue Jays.
