= Brian Lesher =

American baseball player (born 1971)

- Outfielder
- Born: March 5, 1971 (age 55); Wilrijk, Belgium
- Batted: Right Threw: Left

MLB debut
- August 25, 1996, for the Oakland Athletics

Last MLB appearance
- September 28, 2002, for the Toronto Blue Jays

MLB statistics
- Batting average: .224
- Home runs: 9
- Runs batted in: 38
- Stats at Baseball Reference

Teams
- Oakland Athletics (1996–1998); Seattle Mariners (2000); Toronto Blue Jays (2002)

Brian Herbert Lesher (born March 5, 1971) is an American former professional baseball outfielder. He played in Major League Baseball (MLB) for the Oakland Athletics, Seattle Mariners, and Toronto Blue Jays.

Lesher was born in Belgium where his father, John, a former West Virginia Mountaineers basketball player, was playing professional basketball. Lesher played college baseball for the University of Delaware and was selected by Oakland in the 25th round of the 1992 MLB draft.

Lesher entered the majors in 1996 with the Athletics, playing for three consecutive years before joining the Seattle Mariners in 2000 and Toronto Blue Jays in 2002. His most productive season came in 1997 with Oakland, when he posted career-highs in games (46), home runs (4), runs batted in (17), runs scored (17), and stolen bases (4). Lesher is the only person born in Belgium to play major league baseball.

In a five-season career, Lesher was a .224 hitter with nine home runs and 38 RBI in 108 games.

Following his playing career, Lesher became the head coach at Newark Charter School and coached his two sons. Lesher was inducted to the Delaware Baseball Coaches Association Hall of Fame in 2023.
