= Simon Pond =

Canadian baseball player

- First baseman
- Born: October 27, 1976 (age 49); North Vancouver, British Columbia, Canada
- Batted: Left Threw: Right

MLB debut
- April 7, 2004, for the Toronto Blue Jays

Last MLB appearance
- June 5, 2004, for the Toronto Blue Jays

MLB statistics
- Batting average: .163
- Home runs: 1
- Runs batted in: 6
- Stats at Baseball Reference

Teams
- Toronto Blue Jays (2004)

Simon Emilio Pond (born October 27, 1976) is a Canadian former first baseman, third baseman, and outfielder in Major League Baseball. Born in North Vancouver, British Columbia, he was originally selected by the Montreal Expos in the 8th round of the 1994 amateur draft (224th overall), and played in the Expos' farm system until 2000, when he was traded to the Cleveland Indians. He made his major league debut with the Toronto Blue Jays in 2004, and was a member of Team Canada at the 2004 Summer Olympics, where they finished in fourth place in the baseball tournament.

During the 2005 season, he was signed by the Baltimore Orioles and played with their Double-A affiliate, the Bowie Baysox.

Simon spent 2006 playing in the Pittsburgh Pirates organization with the Double-A affiliate of the Pirates, the Altoona Curve.
