= Dave Berg (infielder) =

American baseball player (born 1970)

- Utility player
- Born: September 3, 1970 (age 55); Roseville, California, U.S.
- Batted: Right Threw: Right

MLB debut
- April 2, 1998, for the Florida Marlins

Last MLB appearance
- September 29, 2004, for the Toronto Blue Jays

MLB statistics
- Batting average: .269
- Home runs: 21
- Runs batted in: 163
- Stats at Baseball Reference

Teams
- Florida Marlins (1998–2001); Toronto Blue Jays (2002–2004)

David Scott Berg (born September 3, 1970) is an American former professional baseball utility player and the current manager of the Arkansas Travelers, the Double-A affiliate of the Seattle Mariners. Berg played in six major league seasons with the Florida Marlins (1998-2001) and Toronto Blue Jays (2002-2004). A versatile utility-man in the purest sense, David Scott Berg was an adequate defensive player at all infield positions who also played some left and right field.

== Career ==
=== Playing ===
A native of Roseville, California, Berg played college baseball at the University of Miami. He was originally selected by the Florida Marlins in the 38th round of the 1993 Major League Baseball draft. He made his major league debut for the Marlins on April 2, 1998, becoming the lowest-ever draft pick by the franchise to reach the Majors. He hit .313 in 1998. Berg played for the Marlins for four seasons before signing with the Toronto Blue Jays prior to the 2002 season. He spent the next three seasons with the Blue Jays.

He retired from baseball in 2006.

=== Coaching ===
After his playing days ended Berg became a coach, initially in the Marlins organization. In 2010 and 2011, Berg managed the Short-Season A Jamestown Jammers. In 2012 and 2014 he managed the Low-A Greensboro Grasshoppers while 2013 was spent working as a Marlins minor league infield coordinator. In 2015 and 2016, Berg was the skipper for the Double-A Jacksonville Suns. He was the hitting coach for the Triple-A Tacoma Rainiers in 2017 and 2018, affiliate of the Seattle Mariners. In 2019 he managed their Low-A affiliate West Virginia Power.

Prior to the 2020 season, Berg became the manager of the Double-A Arkansas Travelers.
