= Jason Kershner =

American baseball pitcher (born 1976)

- Pitcher
- Born: December 19, 1976 (age 49); Scottsdale, Arizona, U.S.
- Batted: Left Threw: Left

MLB debut
- July 25, 2002, for the San Diego Padres

Last MLB appearance
- June 16, 2004, for the Toronto Blue Jays

MLB statistics
- Win–loss record: 3–5
- Earned run average: 4.22
- Strikeouts: 65
- Stats at Baseball Reference

Teams
- San Diego Padres (2002); Toronto Blue Jays (2002–2004)

Jason Ashley Kershner (born December 19, 1976) is a former professional baseball pitcher. He played three seasons at the major league level, playing for the San Diego Padres and the Toronto Blue Jays. Kershner won three games in the major leagues (all in 2003) and picked up his only career save on September 11, 2002. In an extra inning game against the Indians, Kershner pitched the 11th inning, allowing 1 run but nailing down a 6-5 Blue Jays victory.

He was selected by the Philadelphia Phillies in 12th round of the 1995 Major League Baseball draft. Kershner played his first professional season with their Rookie league Martinsville Phillies in 1995. He spent the 2007 season playing for the Cincinnati Reds Triple-A club, the Louisville Bats. He started the 2008 season playing for the Phillies Double-A affiliate, the Reading Phillies, but was released in late June.

On July 10, 2008, Kershner signed a minor league contract with the Seattle Mariners and was assigned to the Triple-A Tacoma Rainiers. He became a free agent at the end of the season. Kershner then signed with the York Revolution of the Atlantic League for the 2009 season. He ended his career with the Victoria Seals of the Golden Baseball League.
