= Raúl Mondesí =

Dominican baseball player (born 1971)

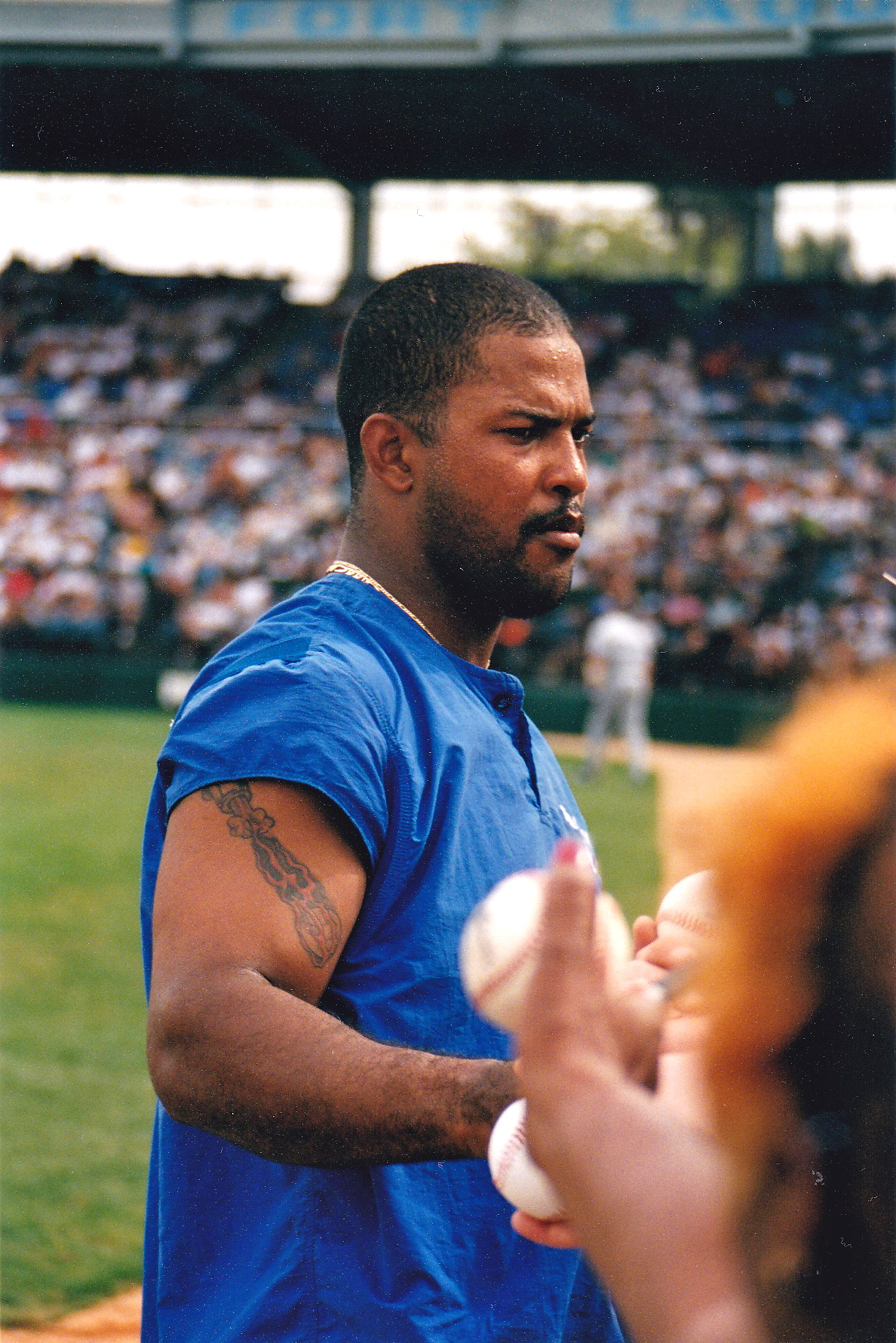
- Mondesí signing autographs at Spring Training in 1998
- Right fielder
- Born: March 12, 1971 (age 55); San Cristóbal, Dominican Republic
- Batted: Right Threw: Right

MLB debut
- July 19, 1993, for the Los Angeles Dodgers

Last MLB appearance
- May 27, 2005, for the Atlanta Braves

MLB statistics
- Batting average: .273
- Home runs: 271
- Runs batted in: 860
- Stats at Baseball Reference

Teams
- Los Angeles Dodgers (1993–1999); Toronto Blue Jays (2000–2002); New York Yankees (2002–2003); Arizona Diamondbacks (2003); Pittsburgh Pirates (2004); Anaheim Angels (2004); Atlanta Braves (2005)

Career highlights and awards
- All-Star (1995); NL Rookie of the Year (1994); 2× Gold Glove Award (1995, 1997)

Raúl Ramón Mondesí Avelino (born March 12, 1971) is a Dominican former politician and baseball player. Mondesí played in Major League Baseball (MLB) for 13 seasons, primarily for the Los Angeles Dodgers, and made his MLB debut with them in 1993. He was the National League (NL) Rookie of the Year in 1994, an MLB All-Star, and a two-time Rawlings Gold Glove Award winner. Known for his combination of power and speed, Mondesí twice achieved the 30–30 club. He led MLB right fielders in assists in three separate seasons over the course of his career.

After baseball, Mondesí began a career in politics, gaining election to the Dominican Chamber of Deputies in 2006. In 2010, he became mayor of San Cristóbal in the Dominican Republic, serving a six-year term. In 2017, Mondesí was sentenced to eight years in prison on corruption charges arising from his mayoral tenure.

== Career ==
=== Los Angeles Dodgers ===
Mondesí was originally signed by the Los Angeles Dodgers as an amateur free agent in 1988 out of the Dominican Republic. With the Great Falls Dodgers in 1990, he hit .303 with 30 stolen bases and was selected to the Pioneer League All-Star team. In 1991, he played in 21 games with the Bakersfield Dodgers, 53 games with the San Antonio Missions, and 2 with the Albuquerque Dukes hitting .277 with 8 home runs and 18 stolen bases. In 1992, he played 18 games with San Antonio and 35 with Albuquerque, hitting .296. He spent all of 1993 with the Dukes, hitting .280 with 12 homers and 13 steals.

He made his MLB debut for the Dodgers on July 19, 1993, against the Philadelphia Phillies, hitting a single to center field as a pinch hitter in seventh inning against David West for his first major league hit. He hit his first home run, a two-run shot off Bob Scanlan in the 13th inning of a game against the Chicago Cubs on July 31. He returned to the minors after the August 6 games, but was back with the Dodgers for good in September. He appeared in 42 games that season for the Dodgers, hitting .291 with four home runs.

Mondesí made the Dodgers opening day roster in 1994 and played in 112 games, hitting .306 with 16 homers, 56 RBI, and 11 stolen bases. He was selected as the National League Rookie of the Year.

In 1995, he was twice selected as National League Player of the Week (April 30 and July 5), he won the Rawlings Gold Glove Award and was selected to the 1995 Major League Baseball All-Star Game. He flew out to right field in his one at-bat in the All-Star game. He also competed in the Home Run Derby. Overall, he hit .285 with 26 home runs, 88 RBI, and 14 stolen bases. He had two hits in nine at-bats for the Dodgers in the 1995 National League Division Series loss to the Cincinnati Reds. He was two for twelve in the 1996 National League Division Series against the Atlanta Braves, with two doubles.

In 1997, he hit .310 with 30 homers, 88 RBI, and 32 steals becoming the first Dodger player in history to join the 30–30 club. He also won his second Rawlings Gold Glove Award and finished 15th in voting for the National League Most Valuable Player Award. In 1999, he again joined the 30–30 club with 33 homers and 36 steals, though his average had dipped to .253.

=== Toronto Blue Jays ===
On November 8, 1999, Mondesí was traded by the Dodgers (along with Pedro Borbón Jr.) to the Toronto Blue Jays for Shawn Green and minor league player Jorge Nunez. He only played in 96 games during his first season in Toronto after he tore ligaments in his right elbow during a game on July 21, which required season-ending surgery. He played two and a half seasons with the Blue Jays, playing in 320 games and hitting 66 home runs. He won the American League Player of the Week Award for the week of May 6, 2001.

=== New York Yankees ===
Mondesí was traded by the Blue Jays to the New York Yankees on July 1, 2002, for Scott Wiggins. He played in 71 games for the Yankees that season and another 98 in 2003, hitting .250 with 27 home runs and 92 RBI. He had 3 hits in 12 at-bats for the Yankees in the 2002 American League Division Series against the Anaheim Angels.

=== Arizona Diamondbacks ===
The Yankees traded Mondesí on July 29, 2003, to the Arizona Diamondbacks for David Dellucci, Bret Prinz and minor leaguer John Prowl. In 45 games with the Diamondbacks, he hit .302 with eight home runs.

=== Pittsburgh Pirates ===
Mondesí signed as a free agent with the Pittsburgh Pirates on February 24, 2004. By May he was talking of leaving the team for personal reasons, involving a legal dispute, in the Dominican Republic. He left the team on May 11, 2004, and his contract was terminated a week later.

=== Anaheim Angels ===
The Anaheim Angels signed Mondesí on May 30, 2004. The deal was investigated by Major League Baseball, but the Angels were cleared of any wrongdoing. Shortly after Mondesí signed with the Angels, he tore his quadriceps and was placed on the disabled list. He was released by the Angels in July for not showing up for his rehab therapy.

=== Atlanta Braves ===
The Atlanta Braves signed Mondesí in 2005; he appeared in 41 games with the team before the Braves released him on May 31.

== Career statistics ==
In 1525 games over 13 seasons, Mondesí recorded a .273 batting average (1589-for-5814) with 909 runs, 319 doubles, 49 triples, 271 home runs, 860 RBI, 229 stolen bases, 475 walks, .331 on-base percentage, and .485 slugging percentage. Defensively, although primarily a right fielder, he posted a .976 fielding percentage playing at all three outfield positions.

== Post-baseball career ==
In May 2006, running on the ballot of the Dominican Liberation Party, Mondesi was elected to a seat in the Dominican Republic's Chamber of Deputies, representing his home province San Cristóbal. In November 2007, he switched sides, aligning himself with the Dominican Revolutionary Party after discrepancies with the government over humanitarian aid to be given to his province after Tropical Storm Noel. He was elected mayor of his hometown on May 16, 2010, for a six-year term.

In September 2017, Mondesi was sentenced to eight years in prison and ordered to pay a $1.3 million fine for corruption and mishandling of public funds during his term as mayor of San Cristóbal. In 2024, Mondesi was re-sentenced to a term of six years and nine months imprisonment. As he had been under house arrest, the sentence was considered served.

== Personal life ==
Mondesí's son Adalberto Mondesí (formerly known as Raul Mondesí Jr.) is also a professional baseball player. He made his MLB debut for the Kansas City Royals in the 2015 World Series.

== See also ==
- List of Major League Baseball career home run leaders
- List of Major League Baseball career stolen bases leaders
- 30–30 club

Achievements
| Preceded by none | Players Choice NL Most Outstanding Rookie; 1994 | Succeeded by Chipper Jones |
Political offices
| Preceded by ? | Deputy of the Dominican Congress for San Cristobal; 2006–2010 | Succeeded by Josefina Tamárez |
| Preceded by José Montás | Mayor for San Cristobal; 2010 – 2016 | Succeeded by |
