= Scott Wiggins =

American baseball player (born 1976)

- Pitcher
- Born: March 24, 1976 (age 50); Fort Thomas, Kentucky, U.S.
- Batted: Left Threw: Left

MLB debut
- September 11, 2002, for the Toronto Blue Jays

Last MLB appearance
- September 20, 2002, for the Toronto Blue Jays

MLB statistics
- Win–loss record: 0–0
- Earned run average: 3.38
- Strikeouts: 3
- Stats at Baseball Reference

Teams
- Toronto Blue Jays (2002)

Scott Joseph Wiggins (born March 24, 1976) is an American former professional baseball pitcher. He played in Major League Baseball for the Toronto Blue Jays in 2002.

Originally drafted by the New York Yankees in 1999, Wiggins was traded to the Toronto Blue Jays in 2002 in exchange for Raúl Mondesí. Wiggins appeared in three games as a reliever for the Blue Jays as a September call-up in 2002, recording a 0–0 record with a 3.38 ERA in 2.2 innings pitched with three strikeouts.

In 10 minor league and independent league seasons, Wiggins posted a 31–24 win-loss record with a 3.60 ERA in 595.1 innings pitched with 561 strikeouts.
