= Brian Bowles (baseball) =

American baseball player (born 1976)

- Relief pitcher
- Born: August 18, 1976 (age 50); Harbor City, California
- Batted: Right Threw: Right

MLB debut
- June 27, 2001, for the Toronto Blue Jays

Last MLB appearance
- September 8, 2003, for the Toronto Blue Jays

MLB statistics
- Win–loss record: 2–1
- Earned run average: 3.23
- Strikeouts: 25
- Stats at Baseball Reference

Teams
- Toronto Blue Jays (2001–2003)

Brian Christopher Bowles (born August 18, 1976) is a former Major League Baseball relief pitcher, born in Harbor City, California. He was drafted by the Toronto Blue Jays in the 50th round of the 1994 amateur draft. Bowles signed on to play minor league baseball in the Blue Jays organization. He batted and threw right-handed during his baseball career.

== Major league career ==
Bowles made his major league debut for the Blue Jays at age 24. That year, had an earned run average of 0.00 in 3 2/3 innings. In 2002, Bowles had an earned run average of 4.05 in 20 innings, going 2–1. In 2003, Bowles recorded a 2.57 earned run average in 7.0 innings. On October 15, 2003, Bowles was granted free agency. Less than two months later, Bowles signed with the Milwaukee Brewers. After failing to make the Major League roster in 2004, Bowles was released by the Brewers on July 8. On July 21, he signed with the Colorado Rockies. Bowles, however, became unhappy in the Rockies system. On October 15, 2004, Bowles was again granted free agency. On March 6, 2005, Bowles was signed by Chicago White Sox. After failing to make the roster, Bowles was released on March 30, only 24 days after he was signed. After not playing in 2005, Bowles was signed on March 4, 2006, by the Baltimore Orioles. After the season, Bowles was granted free agency. On November 13, 2006, Bowles was signed by the San Francisco Giants. He did not, however, play a game as Giant. After playing the 2007 season for the Triple-A Fresno Grizzlies, Bowles retired. Bowles is now the head varsity baseball coach and teacher for Palos Verdes Peninsula High School.

At the time of his retirement Bowles had a 2–1 record, a 3.23 earned run average, 17 walks, and 25 strikeouts. His lifetime fielding percentage was .800.

== Pitching style ==
Bowles threw a 91-mile per hour four-seam fastball, an 89-90 mile per hour two-seam fastball in addition to an 84-86 mile per hour slider, and an 80-84 mile per hour forkball. Bowles' fastballs were his best pitches.

== Personal life ==
Bowles attended college at the University of California, Santa Barbara and earned a B.A. in history in Spring 2008.
