= Brian Cooper (baseball) =

American baseball player (born 1974)

- Pitcher
- Born: August 19, 1974 (age 51); Hollywood, California, U.S.
- Batted: Right Threw: Right

MLB debut
- September 7, 1999, for the Anaheim Angels

Last MLB appearance
- September 28, 2005, for the San Francisco Giants

MLB statistics
- Win–loss record: 5–14
- Earned run average: 5.80
- Strikeouts: 75
- Stats at Baseball Reference

Teams
- Anaheim Angels (1999–2001); Toronto Blue Jays (2002); San Francisco Giants (2004–2005)

Brian John Cooper (born August 19, 1974), is a retired professional baseball pitcher. He played all or parts of six seasons in Major League Baseball between 1999 and 2005, where he played for the Anaheim Angels, Toronto Blue Jays, and San Francisco Giants. He is currently the pitching coach for the San Jose Giants.

== Pitching style ==
Cooper threw an 86–89 MPH four-seam fastball, a slider from 80–84 MPH, a 78–82 MPH sinker, a 79–82 MPH changeup, and an occasional 72–78 MPH curveball.
