= Scott Cassidy =

American baseball player (born 1975)

Le Moyne Dolphins
- Relief pitcher / Coach
- Born: October 3, 1975 (age 50); Syracuse, New York, U.S.
- Batted: Right Threw: Right

MLB debut
- April 1, 2002, for the Toronto Blue Jays

Last MLB appearance
- September 26, 2006, for the San Diego Padres

MLB statistics
- Win–loss record: 8–9
- Earned run average: 4.88
- Strikeouts: 109
- Stats at Baseball Reference

Teams
- Toronto Blue Jays (2002); Boston Red Sox (2005); San Diego Padres (2005–2006)
Medals
Men's baseball
Representing United States
Baseball World Cup
Silver medal – second place	2001 Taipei	National team

Scott Robert Cassidy (born October 3, 1975) is an American baseball coach for the Le Moyne Dolphins baseball team and former relief pitcher who played in Major League Baseball from 2002 to 2006. Cassidy played with the Toronto Blue Jays (2002), Boston Red Sox (2005) and San Diego Padres (2005–2006). Before his professional career, Cassidy pitched for the USC Aiken Pacers from 1994 to 1995 and the Le Moyne Dolphins. He batted and threw right-handed.

== Life as a Blue Jay ==
Scott Cassidy began his MLB career with the Toronto Blue Jays in 2002 appearing in 58 games and logging 66.0 innings. He ended his first season with a 1–4 record with an ERA of 5.73 in 58 games.

He then spent 2003 in Triple-A where he was pitching for the Syracuse SkyChiefs as a reliever.

== Dealt to Boston ==
On April 18, 2004, the Jays traded Cassidy to their AL East rival, the Boston Red Sox, for a player to be named. Scott did not prove to be a major acquisition as he finished the 2004 campaign playing on the Red Sox's Triple-A affiliate in Pawtucket. He also spent the first part of the 2005 year in Triple-A splitting time between the Pawtucket and Portland squads.

He then pitched in 1 game for Boston coming in as a relief pitcher. He was traded on July 19, 2005, for the second time in his career. This time it was to a team in the National League, the San Diego Padres. Outfielder Adam Hyzdu came over to Boston in return.

== Pitching in the NL ==
With San Diego for the second half of 2005, Cassidy had a 1–1 record with a much lower ERA then he had as a member of the Red Sox at 6.57. In 2006, he posted a much more respectable 2.53 ERA while winning 6 games.

He threw 42.2 innings in his 42 appearances all of which came out of the bullpen as a reliever. Cassidy signed a minor league contract with the Milwaukee Brewers on December 3, 2007, but announced his retirement on March 2, 2008.

== Pitching style ==
Cassidy primarily throws an 88-90 MPH fastball, and a 78-81 MPH slider. He throws an occasional changeup around 80 MPH, and a curveball around 77 MPH.

== Coaching career ==
After Cassidy's playing career ended, he entered the coaching ranks. He spent a season as a coach at SUNY Sullivan before being named pitching coach under Steve Owens at Le Moyne College for the 2010 season. When Owens left for Bryant after 2010, Cassidy was named Le Moyne's head coach. He earned his 300th win as Le Moyne's coach in 2023.

== Head coaching record ==
Record table
Season	Team	Overall	Conference	Standing	Postseason
Le Moyne Dolphins (Northeast-10 Conference) (2011–2023)
2011	Le Moyne	23–30			
2012	Le Moyne	43–15–1	20–8–1	1st (SouthWest)	NCAA Division 2 Regional
2013	Le Moyne	25–24	16–11	3rd (SouthWest)	Northeast–10 Conference Tournament
2014	Le Moyne	19–23	13–9	3rd (SouthWest)	Northeast–10 Conference Tournament
2015	Le Moyne	14–24	7–11	6th (SouthWest)	
2016	Le Moyne	27–17	15–8	1st (SouthWest)	Northeast–10 Conference Tournament
2017	Le Moyne	28–16	15–7	1st (SouthWest)	Northeast–10 Conference Tournament
2018	Le Moyne	34–17–1	17–6–1	1st (SouthWest)	NCAA Division 2 Regional
2019	Le Moyne	24–25	13–11	3rd (SouthWest)	Northeast–10 Conference Tournament
2020	Le Moyne	9–7			
2021	Le Moyne	16–9	13–7	2nd (SouthWest)	Northeast–10 Conference Tournament
2022	Le Moyne	27–25	14–10	1st (SouthWest)	NCAA Division 2 Regional
2023	Le Moyne	32–27–1	14–6	1st (SouthWest)	Northeast–10 Conference Tournament
Le Moyne:			157–94–2		
Le Moyne Dolphins (Northeast Conference) (2024–present)
2024	Le Moyne	22–27–1	15–17	8th	
2025	Le Moyne	20–28–0	17–13	5th	
2026	Le Moyne	12–19–0	12–9		
Le Moyne:		375–333–4 (.529)	44–39 (.530)		
Total:		375–333–4 (.529)			
National champion Postseason invitational champion Conference regular season champion Conference regular season and conference tournament champion Division regular season champion Division regular season and conference tournament champion Conference tournament champion
