= 2002 Chicago White Sox season =

2002 Chicago White Sox
- League: American League
- Division: Central
- Ballpark: Comiskey Park
- City: Chicago
- Record: 81–81 (.500)
- Divisional place: 2nd
- Owners: Jerry Reinsdorf
- General managers: Kenny Williams
- Managers: Jerry Manuel
- Television: WGN-TV/WCIU-TV; FSN Chicago (Ken Harrelson, Darrin Jackson)
- Radio: WMVP (John Rooney, Ed Farmer)

The 2002 Chicago White Sox season was the White Sox's 103rd season, and their 102nd in Major League Baseball. They finished with a record of 81–81, good enough for second place in the American League Central, 13.5 games behind the champion Minnesota Twins.

== Offseason ==
February 1, 2002: Kenny Lofton signed as a free agent with the Chicago White Sox.

== Regular season ==
- On May 2, 2002, Mike Cameron of the Mariners hit four home runs in one game versus the White Sox.
- On July 2, the Tigers and White Sox set a Major League Baseball record by combining to hit for 12 home runs in one game. The box score for the home runs is as follows:
  - Detroit Young 2 (7,1st inning off Ritchie 0 on, 2 out, 9th inning off Howry 0 on, 2 out); Fick (11,1st inning off Ritchie 1 on, 2 out); Lombard (1,7th inning off Ritchie 0 on, 1 out); Magee (6,9th inning off Howry 0 on, 0 out); Easley (4,9th inning off Howry 1 on).
  - Chicago Lofton (4,1st inning off Bernero 0 on, 0 out); Ordonez 2 (15,1st inning off Bernero 0 on, 2 out, 8th inning off Paniagua 3 on, 1 out); Valentin (11,2nd inning off Bernero 0 on, 0 out); Alomar 2 (6,4th inning off Bernero 0 on, 2 out, 6th inning off Lima 0 on).

=== Season standings ===
AL Central
Team	W	L	Pct.	GB	Home	Road
Minnesota Twins	94	67	.584	—	54‍–‍27	40‍–‍40
Chicago White Sox	81	81	.500	13½	47‍–‍34	34‍–‍47
Cleveland Indians	74	88	.457	20½	39‍–‍42	35‍–‍46
Kansas City Royals	62	100	.383	32½	37‍–‍44	25‍–‍56
Detroit Tigers	55	106	.342	39	33‍–‍47	22‍–‍59

=== American League Wild Card ===
Division leaders
Team	W	L	Pct.
New York Yankees	103	58	.640
Minnesota Twins	94	67	.584
Oakland Athletics	103	59	.636

Wild Card team (Top team qualifies for postseason)
Team	W	L	Pct.	GB
Anaheim Angels	99	63	.611	—
Boston Red Sox	93	69	.574	6
Seattle Mariners	93	69	.574	6
Chicago White Sox	81	81	.500	18
Toronto Blue Jays	78	84	.481	21
Cleveland Indians	74	88	.457	25
Texas Rangers	72	90	.444	27
Baltimore Orioles	67	95	.414	32
Kansas City Royals	62	100	.383	37
Detroit Tigers	55	106	.342	43½
Tampa Bay Devil Rays	55	106	.342	43½

=== Record vs. opponents ===
2002 American League record Source: MLB Standings Grid – 2002
Team	ANA	BAL	BOS	CWS	CLE	DET	KC	MIN	NYY	OAK	SEA	TB	TEX	TOR	NL
Anaheim	—	7–2	3–4	6–3	6–3	8–1	6–3	4–5	3–4	9–11	9–10	8–1	12–7	7–2	11–7
Baltimore	2–7	—	6–13	3–4	1–5	2–4	7–0	5–1	6–13	4–5	5–4	10–9	3–6	4–15	9–9
Boston	4–3	13–6	—	2–4	5–4	5–4	4–2	3–3	9–10	6–3	4–5	16–3	4–3	13–6	5–13
Chicago	3–6	4–3	4–2	—	9–10	12–7	11–8	8–11	2–4	2–7	5–4	4–3	5–4	4–2	8–10
Cleveland	3–6	5–1	4–5	10–9	—	10–9	9–10	8–11	3–6	2–5	3–4	4–2	4–5	3–3	6–12
Detroit	1–8	4–2	4–5	7–12	9–10	—	9–10	4–14	1–8	1–6	2–5	2–4	5–4	0–6	6–12
Kansas City	3–6	0–7	2–4	8–11	10–9	10–9	—	5–14	1–5	1–8	3–6	4–2	7–2	3–4	5–13
Minnesota	5–4	1–5	3–3	11–8	11–8	14–4	14–5	—	0–6	3–6	5–4	5–2	6–3	6–1	10–8
New York	4–3	13–6	10–9	4–2	6–3	8–1	5–1	6–0	—	5–4	4–5	13–5	4–3	10–9	11–7
Oakland	11–9	5–4	3–6	7–2	5–2	6–1	8–1	6–3	4–5	—	8–11	8–1	13–6	3–6	16–2
Seattle	10–9	4–5	5–4	4–5	4–3	5–2	6–3	4–5	5–4	11–8	—	5–4	13–7	6–3	11–7
Tampa Bay	1–8	9–10	3–16	3–4	2–4	4–2	2–4	2–5	5–13	1–8	4–5	—	4–5	8–11	7–11
Texas	7–12	6–3	3–4	4–5	5–4	4–5	2–7	3–6	3–4	6–13	7–13	5–4	—	8–1	9–9
Toronto	2–7	15–4	6–13	2–4	3–3	6–0	4–3	1–6	9–10	6–3	3–6	11–8	1–8	—	9–9

=== Opening Day lineup ===
- Kenny Lofton, CF
- Ray Durham, 2B
- Frank Thomas, DH
- Magglio Ordóñez, RF
- Paul Konerko, 1B
- José Valentín, 3B
- Carlos Lee, LF
- Sandy Alomar Jr., C
- Royce Clayton, SS
- Mark Buehrle, P

=== Notable transactions ===
- May 16, 2002: Brooks Kieschnick was signed as a free agent with the Chicago White Sox.
- July 25, 2002: Ray Durham was traded by the Chicago White Sox with cash to the Oakland Athletics for Jon Adkins.
- July 28, 2002: Kenny Lofton was traded by the Chicago White Sox to the San Francisco Giants for Felix Diaz and Ryan Meaux (minors).
- July 29, 2002: Sandy Alomar Jr. was traded by the Chicago White Sox to the Colorado Rockies for Enemencio Pacheco (minors).

=== Roster ===
2002 Chicago White Sox
Roster
Pitchers: 49 Lorenzo Barceló; 60 Rocky Biddle; 56 Mark Buehrle; 29 Keith Foulke; 52 Jon Garland; 58 Matt Ginter; 38 Gary Glover; 46 Bob Howry; 43 Dámaso Marte; 13 Antonio Osuna; 40 Jim Parque; 41 Mike Porzio; 51 Jon Rauch; 48 Todd Ritchie; 36 Dan Wright; 65 Kelly Wunsch	Catchers: 15 Sandy Alomar Jr.; 8 Mark Johnson; 61 Miguel Olivo; 27 Josh Paul; Infielders: 10 Royce Clayton; 24 Joe Crede; 5 Ray Durham; 17 Tony Graffanino; 12 Willie Harris; 28 D'Angelo Jiménez; 14 Paul Konerko; 39 Jeff Liefer; 35 Frank Thomas; 22 José Valentín	Outfielders: 25 Joe Borchard; 45 Carlos Lee; 1 Kenny Lofton; 30 Magglio Ordóñez; 44 Aaron Rowand	Manager: 7 Jerry Manuel; Coaches: 54 Nardi Contreras; 18 Wallace Johnson; 59 Man Soo Lee; 53 Art Kusnyer; 23 Joe Nossek; 20 Gary Pettis; 47 Gary Ward

=== Game log ===
2002 White Sox game log
April (16–10) – home (9–2) – road (7–8)

#	Date	Time	Opponent	Score	Win	Loss	Save	Attendance	Record	Box
1	April 1	@ Mariners	6–5	Buehrle (1–0)	García (0–1)	Foulke (1)	3:18	46,036	1–0	box
2	April 2	@ Mariners	4–7	Rhodes (1–0)	Barceló (0–1)	Sasaki (1)	3:03	40,805	1–1	box
3	April 3	@ Mariners	6–7	Franklin (1–0)	Foulke (0–1)		2:50	31,082	1–2	box
4	April 5	@ Royals	2–5	Byrd (1–0)	Garland (0–1)	Stein (1)	2:50	15,975	1–3	box
5	April 6	@ Royals	14–0	Buehrle (2–0)	Durbin (0–1)		2:49	15,178	2–3	box
6	April 7	@ Royals	2–9	Suppan (1–0)	Ritchie (0–1)		2:47	10,788	2–4	box
–	April 8	@ Tigers	Postponed (rain), rescheduled for July 13							
7	April 9	@ Tigers	8–2	Wright (1–0)	Sparks (0–1)		2:34	11,833	3–4	box
8	April 10	@ Tigers	7–5	Osuna (1–0)	Lima (0–2)	Foulke (2)	2:49	14,155	4–4	box
9	April 12	Orioles	5–2	Buehrle (3–0)	Towers (0–2)	Foulke (3)	2:24	41,128	5–4	box
10	April 13	Orioles	4–3	Osuna (2–0)	Roberts (0–1)	Foulke (4)	2:36	19,201	6–4	box
11	April 14	Orioles	4–9	Maduro (1–1)	Wright (1–1)		2:55	23,951	6–5	box
12	April 15	Orioles	13–4	Garland (1–1)	Johnson (0–3)		2:41	15,794	7–5	box
13	April 16	Indians	10–5	Marte (1–0)	Finley (1–1)		2:55	23,502	8–5	box
14	April 17	Indians	7–2	Buehrle (4–0)	Báez (2–1)		2:35	15,561	9–5	box
15	April 18	Indians	7–1	Ritchie (1–1)	Colón (3–1)		2:55	13,880	10–5	box
16	April 19	Tigers	2–8	Sparks (1–1)	Wright (1–2)		2:42	13,917	10–6	box
17	April 20	Tigers	12–5	Garland (2–1)	Cornejo (0–2)		2:51	15,737	11–6	box
18	April 21	Tigers	11–8	Osuna (3–0)	Paniagua (0–1)	Foulke (5)	3:08	13,619	12–6	box
19	April 22	@ Indians	2–4	Báez (3–1)	Buehrle (4–1)	Wickman (6)	2:35	24,519	12–7	box
20	April 23	@ Indians	5–1	Ritchie (2–1)	Colón (3–2)		2:53	25,284	13–7	box
21	April 24	@ Indians	9–2	Wright (2–2)	Sabathia (2–2)		3:04	25,935	14–7	box
22	April 25	@ Indians	6–3	Garland (3–1)	Drese (2–2)	Foulke (6)	3:07	29,046	15–7	box
23	April 26	@ Athletics	4–6	Lidle (1–3)	Parque (0–1)	Koch (5)	2:52	10,129	15–8	box
24	April 27	@ Athletics	1–16	Fyhrie (1–1)	Buehrle (4–2)		2:42	26,111	15–9	box
25	April 28	@ Athletics	0–10	Hudson (3–2)	Ritchie (2–2)		2:37	20,365	15–10	box
26	April 30	Mariners	8–4	Wright (3–2)	Abbott (1–3)		2:41	16,253	16–10	box

May (12–16) – home (8–9) – road (4–7)

#	Date	Time	Opponent	Score	Win	Loss	Save	Attendance	Record	Box
27	May 1	Mariners	9 – 2 (8)	Garland (4–1)	Franklin (2–1)	Glover (1)	2:50	12,735	17–10	box
28	May 2	Mariners	4–15	Baldwin (3–1)	Rauch (0–1)		3:00	12,891	17–11	box
29	May 3	Athletics	6–1	Buehrle (5–2)	Fyhrie (1–2)		2:39	15,746	18–11	box
30	May 4	Athletics	10–2	Ritchie (3–2)	Hudson (3–3)		2:59	27,511	19–11	box
31	May 5	Athletics	2–3	Zito (2–2)	Wright (3–3)	Koch (7)	2:42	27,275	19–12	box
32	May 6	@ Rangers	5–6	Irabu (1–2)	Osuna (3–1)		3:18	24,609	19–13	box
33	May 7	@ Rangers	11–6	Porzio (1–0)	Bell (2–1)	Ginter (1)	3:00	20,108	20–13	box
34	May 8	@ Rangers	5–3	Buehrle (6–2)	Davis (3–3)		2:49	21,305	21–13	box
35	May 9	@ Rangers	1–4	Benoit (1–0)	Ritchie (3–3)	Irabu (8)	2:47	32,962	21–14	box
36	May 10	@ Angels	0–19	Schoeneweis (2–4)	Wright (3–4)		2:48	36,715	21–15	box
37	May 11	@ Angels	3–6	Ortiz (4–3)	Garland (4–2)	Percival (6)	2:49	40,535	21–16	box
38	May 12	@ Angels	4–5	Percival (2–1)	Foulke (0–2)		3:26	19,251	21–17	box
39	May 14	Rangers	15–4	Buehrle (7–2)	Davis (3–4)		3:07	17,503	22–17	box
40	May 15	Rangers	2–5	Valdez (3–4)	Ritchie (3–4)	Irabu (10)	2:47	13,980	22–18	box
41	May 16	Rangers	4–0	Wright (4–4)	Rogers (4–2)		2:16	13,119	23–18	box
42	May 17	Angels	4–8	Schoeneweis (3–4)	Garland (4–3)	Levine (4)	2:56	12,736	23–19	box
43	May 18	Angels	10–4	Glover (1–0)	Ortiz (4–4)		3:08	21,122	24–19	box
44	May 19	Angels	1–6	Washburn (4–2)	Buehrle (7–3)		2:13	19,869	24–20	box
45	May 20	@ Red Sox	0–9	Lowe (7–1)	Ritchie (3–5)		2:20	32,461	24–21	box
46	May 21	@ Red Sox	8–3	Wright (5–4)	Oliver (4–3)		2:48	31,772	25–21	box
47	May 22	@ Red Sox	2–0	Garland (5–3)	Castillo (2–5)	Foulke (7)	2:22	33,157	26–21	box
48	May 24	Tigers	12–1	Buehrle (8–3)	Sparks (2–5)		2:22	14,597	27–21	box
49	May 25	Tigers	6–4	Wunsch (1–0)	Greisinger (2–2)	Foulke (8)	2:33	21,543	28–21	box
50	May 26	Tigers	2–9	Bernero (1–0)	Ritchie (3–6)		2:30	23,353	28–22	box
51	May 27	Yankees	6–10	Thurman (1–0)	Wright (5–5)		2:52	43,781	28–23	box
52	May 28	Yankees	2–4	Lilly (2–4)	Garland (5–4)	Rivera (16)	3:00	27,859	28–24	box
53	May 29	Yankees	3–6	Karsay (2–2)	Foulke (0–3)	Rivera (17)	3:10	27,572	28–25	box
54	May 31	@ Indians	0–7	Colón (7–3)	Glover (1–1)		2:44	33,756	28–26	box

June (12–16) – home (7–6) – road (5–10)

#	Date	Time	Opponent	Score	Win	Loss	Save	Attendance	Record	Box
55	June 1	@ Indians	4–8	Báez (5–4)	Ritchie (3–7)		2:59	37,707	28–27	box
56	June 2	@ Indians	3–4	Finley (4–6)	Wright (5–6)	Wickman (13)	2:42	37,760	28–28	box
57	June 3	Royals	4–0	Garland (6–4)	Affeldt (1–3)		2:41	15,168	29–28	box
58	June 4	Royals	2–3	Asencio (1–0)	Buehrle (8–4)	Hernández (9)	2:42	13,063	29–29	box
59	June 5	Royals	6–1	Glover (2–1)	Suppan (5–5)		2:33	12,167	30–29	box
60	June 6	Royals	3–4	May (1–3)	Ritchie (3–8)	Hernández (10)	2:50	14,311	30–30	box
61	June 7	Expos	3–4	Armas (6–7)	Wright (5–7)	Tucker (3)	2:55	22,481	30–31	box
62	June 8	Expos	1–2	Stewart (1–1)	Foulke (0–4)	Tucker (4)	2:31	24,783	30–32	box
63	June 9	Expos	13–2	Buehrle (9–4)	Pavano (3–8)		2:42	21,870	31–32	box
64	June 10	Mets	1–3	Astacio (7–2)	Glover (2–2)	Benítez (14)	2:51	27,679	31–33	box
65	June 11	Mets	10–8	Ritchie (4–8)	D'Amico (4–5)	Osuna (1)	2:51	20,156	32–33	box
66	June 12	Mets	2–1	Biddle (1–0)	Leiter (6–6)	Osuna (2)	2:36	16,314	33–33	box
67	June 14	@ Cubs	4–8	Clement (5–4)	Garland (6–5)		2:46	38,051	33–34	box
68	June 15	@ Cubs	3–7	Lieber (5–4)	Buehrle (9–5)		2:57	38,860	33–35	box
69	June 16	@ Cubs	10–7	Foulke (1–4)	Wood (6–5)	Osuna (3)	3:09	38,742	34–35	box
70	June 18	@ Phillies	6 – 3 (12)	Osuna (4–1)	Coggin (0–2)	Biddle (1)	4:16	17,424	35–35	box
71	June 19	@ Phillies	3–4	Plesac (2–2)	Biddle (1–1)		2:49	21,905	35–36	box
72	June 20	@ Phillies	6–1	Buehrle (10–5)	Person (2–4)		2:49	22,132	36–36	box
73	June 21	@ Braves	2–3	Gryboski (1–1)	Ritchie (4–9)	Smoltz (23)	2:37	35,102	36–37	box
74	June 22	@ Braves	2–15	Moss (4–2)	Glover (2–3)		2:57	47,276	36–38	box
75	June 23	@ Braves	1–9	Marquis (6–4)	Wright (5–8)		2:45	30,883	36–39	box
76	June 24	@ Twins	4–5	Hawkins (3–0)	Howry (0–1)	Guardado (22)	2:46	24,102	36–40	box
77	June 25	@ Twins	15–7	Buehrle (11–5)	Milton (8–6)		3:19	24,662	37–40	box
78	June 26	@ Twins	5–6	Lohse (7–5)	Ritchie (4–10)	Guardado (23)	2:51	28,340	37–41	box
79	June 27	@ Twins	7–4	Glover (3–3)	Reed (6–4)	Foulke (9)	3:18	29,532	38–41	box
80	June 28	Cubs	13–9	Ginter (1–0)	Borowski (2–4)		3:35	46,027	39–41	box
81	June 29	Cubs	5–4	Garland (7–5)	Cruz (1–10)	Osuna (4)	3:10	45,942	40–41	box
82	June 30	Cubs	2–9	Clement (6–5)	Buehrle (11–6)		2:42	45,351	40–42	box

July (11–15) – home (6–6) – road (5–9)

#	Date	Time	Opponent	Score	Win	Loss	Save	Attendance	Record	Box
83	July 2	Tigers	17–9	Ritchie (5–10)	Bernero (2–4)		2:53	19,331	41–42	box
84	July 3	Tigers	4–5	Moehler (1–0)	Glover (3–4)	Paniagua (1)	3:01	15,064	41–43	box
85	July 4	Tigers	5–6	Sparks (4–8)	Wunsch (1–1)	Acevedo (13)	3:02	22,916	41–44	box
86	July 5	Indians	2–4	Báez (7–6)	Garland (7–6)	Wickman (19)	3:09	29,085	41–45	box
87	July 6	Indians	7–3	Buehrle (12–6)	Phillips (0–1)	Marte (1)	2:38	25,016	42–45	box
88	July 7	Indians	3–9	Drese (8–6)	Ritchie (5–11)		2:55	22,104	42–46	box
All-Star Break: AL and NL tied 7–7 (11) at Miller Park
89	July 11	@ Tigers	9–2	Wright (6–8)	Sparks (4–9)		2:24	16,791	43–46	box
90	July 12	@ Tigers	1–2	Redman (5–8)	Ritchie (5–12)	Acevedo (15)	2:38	26,121	43–47	box
91	July 13	@ Tigers	3–5	Rodney (1–2)	Buehrle (12–7)	Acevedo (16)	2:37	13,189	43–48	box
92	July 13	@ Tigers	1–3	Maroth (2–3)	Biddle (1–2)	Henriquez (1)	2:38	20,058	43–49	box
93	July 14	@ Tigers	6–4	Garland (8–6)	Bernero (2–5)	Osuna (5)	2:33	22,098	44–49	box
94	July 15	@ Indians	1–7	Phillips (1–1)	Glover (3–5)		2:53	30,025	44–50	box
95	July 16	@ Indians	5–4	Osuna (5–1)	Wickman (0–3)	Marte (2)	3:08	30,754	45–50	box
96	July 17	@ Royals	6–8	Suppan (8–7)	Ritchie (5–13)	Hernández (17)	3:08	13,823	45–51	box
97	July 18	@ Royals	3–5	Byrd (13–6)	Marte (1–1)		2:06	15,522	45–52	box
98	July 19	@ Orioles	4–10	López (10–3)	Garland (8–7)		2:44	36,949	45–53	box
99	July 20	@ Orioles	3 – 4 (14)	Bauer (5–4)	Howry (0–2)		4:54	39,257	45–54	box
100	July 21	@ Orioles	8–7	Howry (1–2)	Roberts (5–3)	Osuna (6)	3:12	35,337	46–54	box
101	July 22	Twins	6–11	Reed (8–5)	Ritchie (5–14)		3:33	32,352	46–55	box
102	July 23	Twins	8–7	Buehrle (13–7)	Santana (4–2)	Osuna (7)	3:08	22,665	47–55	box
103	July 24	Twins	1–8	Lohse (10–5)	Garland (8–8)		2:50	23,535	47–56	box
104	July 26	Royals	10–2	Wright (7–8)	Sedlacek (1–1)		3:08	20,803	48–56	box
105	July 27	Royals	9–1	Glover (4–5)	May (2–7)		2:41	28,931	49–56	box
106	July 28	Royals	4–2	Howry (2–2)	Suppan (8–9)	Marte (3)	2:36	29,534	50–56	box
107	July 30	@ Twins	3–0	Buehrle (14–7)	Lohse (10–6)		2:08	27,391	51–56	box
108	July 31	@ Twins	1 – 2 (10)	Romero (6–1)	Osuna (5–2)		3:02	29,478	51–57	box

August (14–13) – home (9–6) – road (5–7)

#	Date	Time	Opponent	Score	Win	Loss	Save	Attendance	Record	Box
109	August 1	@ Twins	0–6	Milton (13–7)	Wright (7–9)		2:25	26,270	51–58	box
110	August 2	@ Devil Rays	8 – 5 (12)	Wunsch (2–1)	Colomé (2–6)	Osuna (8)	3:57	10,823	52–58	box
111	August 3	@ Devil Rays	2–6	Wilson (4–7)	Ritchie (5–15)		2:34	11,963	52–59	box
112	August 4	@ Devil Rays	3–10	Kennedy (7–8)	Buehrle (14–8)		2:41	11,809	52–60	box
113	August 5	@ Devil Rays	4–3	Foulke (2–4)	Yan (5–6)	Marte (4)	2:28	10,769	53–60	box
114	August 6	Angels	2–11	Washburn (14–3)	Wright (7–10)	Levine (5)	3:05	17,706	53–61	box
115	August 7	Angels	7–6	Osuna (6–2)	Donnelly (0–1)		3:33	14,253	54–61	box
116	August 8	Angels	3–2	Parque (1–1)	Sele (8–8)	Marte (5)	2:44	18,165	55–61	box
117	August 9	Mariners	10–2	Buehrle (15–8)	García (12–8)		2:49	28,229	56–61	box
118	August 10	Mariners	3–7	Nelson (3–2)	Biddle (1–3)		3:34	29,766	56–62	box
119	August 11	Mariners	6–5	Wright (8–10)	Baldwin (7–9)	Osuna (9)	2:54	28,282	57–62	box
120	August 13	@ Rangers	12–3	Glover (5–5)	Benoit (2–2)		3:05	25,657	58–62	box
121	August 14	@ Rangers	6–11	Valdez (6–9)	Parque (1–2)		3:11	21,450	58–63	box
122	August 16	@ Athletics	0–1	Lidle (6–9)	Buehrle (15–9)	Koch (31)	2:16	22,622	58–64	box
123	August 17	@ Athletics	2–9	Mulder (14–7)	Garland (8–9)		2:48	40,658	58–65	box
124	August 18	@ Athletics	4–7	Zito (17–5)	Wright (8–11)		2:47	31,489	58–66	box
125	August 19	Twins	3–7	Radke (5–3)	Glover (5–6)		2:42	24,016	58–67	box
126	August 20	Twins	0–5	Lohse (11–7)	Parque (1–3)		2:22	16,192	58–68	box
127	August 21	Twins	10–1	Buehrle (16–9)	Mays (2–5)		2:37	17,225	59–68	box
128	August 23	Devil Rays	2–8	Sturtze (3–13)	Garland (8–10)		2:40	27,988	59–69	box
129	August 24	Devil Rays	5–2	Wright (9–11)	Wilson (6–9)	Marte (6)	2:23	24,580	60–69	box
130	August 25	Devil Rays	8–3	Glover (6–6)	Kennedy (7–9)		2:44	20,340	61–69	box
131	August 26	Blue Jays	4–8	Thurman (2–2)	Parque (1–4)		3:23	15,760	61–70	box
132	August 27	Blue Jays	8 – 4 (10)	Osuna (7–2)	Cassidy (0–4)		2:25	12,185	62–70	box
133	August 28	Blue Jays	8–0	Garland (9–10)	Parris (5–5)		2:20	12,972	63–70	box
134	August 30	@ Tigers	4–3	Wright (10–11)	Maroth (5–6)	Marte (7)	2:36	16,857	64–70	box
135	August 31	@ Tigers	9–4	Glover (7–6)	Sparks (8–14)		2:46	15,726	65–70	box

September (16–11) – home (8–5) – road (8–6)

#	Date	Time	Opponent	Score	Win	Loss	Save	Attendance	Record	Box
136	September 1	@ Tigers	7–0	Buehrle (17–9)	Redman (8–13)		2:18	14,856	66–70	box
137	September 2	@ Blue Jays	5–3	Garland (10–10)	Thurman (2–3)	Marte (8)	2:58	18,373	67–70	box
138	September 3	@ Blue Jays	5–4	Rauch (1–1)	Loaiza (7–8)	Marte (9)	2:59	14,427	68–70	box
139	September 4	@ Blue Jays	2–6	Walker (8–4)	Wright (10–12)		2:39	21,122	68–71	box
140	September 5	Indians	6–11	Rodríguez (2–1)	Glover (7–7)		2:59	12,667	68–72	box
141	September 6	Indians	7–9	Burba (5–5)	Buehrle (17–10)	Báez (2)	2:48	17,131	68–73	box
142	September 7	Indians	2–4	Sabathia (11–10)	Garland (10–11)	Wohlers (7)	2:28	16,622	68–74	box
143	September 8	Indians	7–6	Osuna (8–2)	Báez (10–11)		2:56	15,067	69–74	box
144	September 9	@ Royals	10–6	Wright (11–12)	Byrd (15–11)		2:38	9,555	70–74	box
145	September 10	@ Royals	12–4	Porzio (2–0)	Hernández (3–4)	Osuna (10)	3:20	10,106	71–74	box
146	September 11	@ Royals	6–9	May (4–9)	Buehrle (17–11)		2:51	12,104	71–75	box
147	September 12	@ Royals	5–1	Garland (11–11)	Asencio (3–6)		2:22	10,427	72–75	box
148	September 13	@ Yankees	13–2	Biddle (2–3)	Mussina (16–10)	Osuna (11)	3:22	45,935	73–75	box
149	September 14	@ Yankees	8–1	Wright (12–12)	Clemens (12–6)		2:45	44,795	74–75	box
150	September 15	@ Yankees	4 – 8 (6)	Pettitte (11–5)	Porzio (2–1)		2:01	39,587	74–76	box
151	September 17	Royals	6–1	Buehrle (18–11)	Asencio (3–7)	Foulke (10)	2:31	12,003	75–76	box
152	September 18	Royals	3–1	Garland (12–11)	Suppan (8–16)	Marte (10)	2:41	10,246	76–76	box
153	September 19	Royals	1–2	Byrd (17–11)	Biddle (2–4)	Hernández (26)	2:31	10,354	76–77	box
154	September 20	Twins	10–2	Wright (13–12)	Rincón (0–2)		2:24	16,128	77–77	box
155	September 21	Twins	14–4	Rauch (2–1)	Radke (9–5)		2:53	20,645	78–77	box
156	September 22	Twins	8–2	Buehrle (19–11)	Mays (4–8)		2:40	15,112	79–77	box
157	September 24	Red Sox	2–4	Fossum (5–4)	Garland (12–12)	Urbina (39)	2:57	14,168	79–78	box
158	September 25	Red Sox	7–2	Biddle (3–4)	Lowe (21–8)		2:19	13,102	80–78	box
159	September 26	Red Sox	3–2	Wright (14–12)	Hancock (0–1)	Foulke (11)	2:11	12,304	81–78	box
160	September 27	@ Twins	1–3	Fiore (10–3)	Glover (7–8)	Guardado (44)	2:22	21,905	81–79	box
161	September 28	@ Twins	2–3	Hawkins (6–0)	Buehrle (19–12)	Guardado (45)	2:35	32,072	81–80	box
162	September 29	@ Twins	1–3	Wells (2–1)	Porzio (2–2)	Romero (1)	2:27	31,270	81–81	box

== Player stats ==
=== Batting ===
Note: G = Games played; AB = At bats; R = Runs scored; H = Hits; 2B = Doubles; 3B = Triples; HR = Home runs; RBI = Runs batted in; BB = Base on balls; SO = Strikeouts; AVG = Batting average; SB = Stolen bases

Player	G	AB	R	H	2B	3B	HR	RBI	BB	SO	AVG	SB
Sandy Alomar Jr., C	51	167	21	48	10	1	7	25	5	14	.287	0
Joe Borchard, OF	16	36	5	8	0	0	2	5	1	14	.222	0
Mark Buehrle, P	34	6	1	1	0	0	0	0	0	4	.167	0
Royce Clayton, SS	112	342	51	86	14	2	7	35	20	67	.251	5
Joe Crede, 3B	53	200	28	57	10	0	12	35	8	40	.285	0
Ray Durham, 2B	96	345	71	103	20	2	9	48	49	59	.299	20
Keith Foulke, P	65	1	0	0	0	0	0	0	0	0	.000	0
Jon Garland, P	33	2	0	0	0	0	0	0	0	0	.000	0
Gary Glover, P	41	1	0	0	0	0	0	0	0	1	.000	0
Tony Graffanino, 3B, 2B, SS	70	229	35	60	12	4	6	31	22	38	.262	2
Willie Harris, 2B, CF	49	163	14	38	4	0	2	12	9	21	.233	8
D'Angelo Jiménez, 2B, SS	27	108	22	31	4	3	1	11	16	10	.287	2
Mark Johnson, C	86	263	31	55	8	1	4	18	30	52	.209	0
Paul Konerko, 1B	151	570	81	173	30	0	27	104	44	72	.304	0
Carlos Lee, LF	140	492	82	130	26	2	26	80	75	73	.264	1
Jeff Liefer, OF, 1B, DH	76	204	28	47	8	0	7	26	19	60	.230	0
Kenny Lofton, CF	93	352	68	91	20	6	8	42	49	51	.259	22
Dámaso Marte, P	68	1	0	0	0	0	0	0	0	1	.000	0
Miguel Olivo, C	6	19	2	4	1	0	1	5	2	5	.211	0
Magglio Ordóñez, RF	153	590	116	189	47	1	38	135	53	77	.320	7
Josh Paul, C	33	104	11	25	4	0	0	11	9	22	.240	2
Todd Ritchie, P	27	4	1	1	0	0	0	0	1	1	.250	0
Aaron Rowand, CF	126	302	41	78	16	2	7	29	12	54	.258	0
Frank Thomas, DH, 1B	148	523	77	132	29	1	28	92	88	115	.252	3
José Valentín, 3B	135	474	70	118	26	4	25	75	43	99	.249	3
Dan Wright, P	33	4	0	0	0	0	0	0	0	2	.000	0
Team totals	162	5502	856	1475	289	29	217	819	555	952	.268	75

=== Pitching ===
Note: W = Wins; L = Losses; ERA = Earned run average; G = Games pitched; GS = Games started; SV = Saves; IP = Innings pitched; H = Hits allowed; R = Runs allowed; ER = Earned runs allowed; HR = Home runs allowed; BB = Walks allowed; K = Strikeouts

Player	W	L	ERA	G	GS	SV	IP	H	R	ER	HR	BB	K
Lorenzo Barceló	0	1	9.00	4	0	0	6.0	9	6	6	1	1	1
Rocky Biddle	3	4	4.06	44	7	1	77.2	72	42	35	13	43	64
Mark Buehrle	19	12	3.58	34	34	0	239.0	236	102	95	25	68	134
Keith Foulke	2	4	2.90	65	0	11	77.2	65	26	25	7	15	58
Jon Garland	12	12	4.58	33	33	0	192.2	188	109	98	23	84	112
Matt Ginter	1	0	4.47	33	0	1	54.1	59	34	27	6	21	37
Gary Glover	7	8	5.20	41	22	1	138.1	136	86	80	21	53	70
Bob Howry	2	2	3.91	47	0	0	50.2	45	22	22	7	19	31
Dámaso Marte	1	1	2.83	68	0	10	60.1	44	19	19	5	20	72
Antonio Osuna	8	2	3.86	59	0	11	67.2	64	32	29	1	32	66
Jim Parque	1	4	9.95	8	4	0	25.1	34	29	28	11	16	13
Mike Porzio	2	2	4.81	32	0	0	43.0	40	25	23	10	25	33
Jon Rauch	2	1	6.59	8	6	0	28.2	28	26	21	7	16	19
Todd Ritchie	5	15	6.06	26	23	0	133.2	176	104	90	18	54	77
Dan Wright	14	12	5.18	33	33	0	196.1	200	124	113	32	72	136
Kelly Wunsch	2	1	3.41	50	0	0	31.2	26	12	12	3	20	22
Team totals	81	81	4.53	162	162	35	1423.0	1422	798	716	190	559	945

== Farm system ==
Level	Team	League	Manager
AAA	Charlotte Knights	International League	Nick Capra
AA	Birmingham Barons	Southern League	Wally Backman
A	Winston-Salem Warthogs	Carolina League	Razor Shines
A	Kannapolis Intimidators	South Atlantic League	John Orton
Rookie	Bristol White Sox	Appalachian League	Nick Leyva
Rookie	AZL White Sox	Arizona League	Jerry Hairston, Sr.

LEAGUE CHAMPIONS: Birmingham, Bristol
