= Ken Vining =

American baseball player (born 1974)

- Pitcher
- Born: December 5, 1974 (age 51); Decatur, Georgia, U.S.
- Batted: Left Threw: Left

MLB debut
- May 23, 2001, for the Chicago White Sox

Last MLB appearance
- July 5, 2001, for the Chicago White Sox

MLB statistics
- Win–loss record: 0–0
- Earned run average: 17.55
- Strikeouts: 3
- Stats at Baseball Reference

Teams
- Chicago White Sox (2001)

Kenneth Edward Vining (born December 5, 1974) is an American former Major League Baseball (MLB) pitcher. Vining played for the Chicago White Sox during the 2001 season. In 8 career games, he posted an 0–0 record and an earned run average (ERA) of 17.55. Vining batted and threw left-handed.

== Amateur career ==
Vining attended Cardinal Newman High School in Columbia, South Carolina. He was a 62nd–round draft pick of the Cleveland Indians in the 1993 draft, but he went to Clemson University in Clemson, South Carolina instead of signing with Cleveland. Vining spent three seasons with Clemson. In 1994, his freshman season, Vining posted a 3–0 record and a 4.20 ERA in 20 appearances. The following year, he saw action in 22 games, making 9 starts. He had a 4–0 record, two saves, and a 3.39 ERA. As a junior in 1996, Vining started in 16 of his 19 appearances, tallying a 10–3 record and ERA of 2.97. From 1994 to 1996, he played collegiate summer baseball with the Chatham A's of the Cape Cod Baseball League and was named a league all-star in 1994.

== Professional career ==
During the 1996 Major League Baseball draft, the San Francisco Giants selected Vining in the 4th round. He officially joined their organization on June 28. Vining made his professional debut with the Single–A Bellingham Giants of the Northwest League. He made 12 appearances (11 starts) in 1996, posting a 4–2 record and a 2.09 ERA. In 60.1 innings, Vining struck out 69 batters and surrendered 23 walks.

Vining began the 1997 season with the San Jose Giants of the Single–A California League. In 23 starts, Vining went 9–6 with a 4.21 ERA. He recorded 142 strikeouts and 60 walks over 136.2 innings. On July 31, 1997, Vining was one of six prospects (along with Keith Foulke, Bob Howry, Lorenzo Barceló, Mike Caruso, and Brian Manning) traded to the White Sox in exchange for Wilson Álvarez, Danny Darwin, and Roberto Hernández in what became known as the White Flag Trade. Now a member of the White Sox organization, Vining finished the year by making 5 starts for the Single–A Winston–Salem Warthogs. He had a 2–2 record and an ERA of 2.86.

In 1998, Vining made 28 starts for the Birmingham Barons of the Double–A Southern League. He posted a 10–12 record and a 4.07 ERA, striking out 133 batters and walking 91 in 172.2 innings. Vining remained with Birmingham for the following season, but only made three starts. He was credited with an 0–2 record and an ERA of 9.26.

Vining made the transition from a starting pitcher to a relief pitcher prior to the 2000 season, which he again spent with Birmingham. In 43 appearances, Vining posted an ERA of 4.08 and a 1–5 record. In 46.1 innings, he struck out 41 and walked 18. Following the 2000 season, Vining played in the Arizona Fall League as a member of the Phoenix Desert Dogs. In 12 games, he posted a 1.50 ERA and a 3–0 record, striking out 12 batters and walking only one.

In 2001, Vining spent most of the season with the Triple–A Charlotte Knights of the International League. He appeared in 41 games for Charlotte, posting an ERA of 1.96 over 46 innings, while striking out 47 batters and surrendering 19 walks. Vining made his MLB debut on May 23 against the Toronto Blue Jays. He faced two batters, and recorded his first MLB strikeout against Tony Batista. In 8 appearances with the White Sox, Vining surrendered 13 earned runs over 6.2 innings, amassing an ERA of 17.55. He made his final major league appearance on July 5.

Vining spent the 2002 season with Charlotte, posting a 2.87 ERA over 44 appearances (47 innings). He had a 2–5 record, walked 25, and struck out 35. He left the White Sox organization after the season and signed with the Houston Astros on November 6.

During the 2003 season, Vining made 41 appearances, including 6 starts, for Houston's Triple–A affiliate, the New Orleans Zephyrs. In 64 innings, he had a 5.20 ERA, struck out 30 batters, walked 22, and tallied a 3–5 record. He was released by the Astros organization on August 22.
