= Danny Darwin =

American baseball player (born 1955)

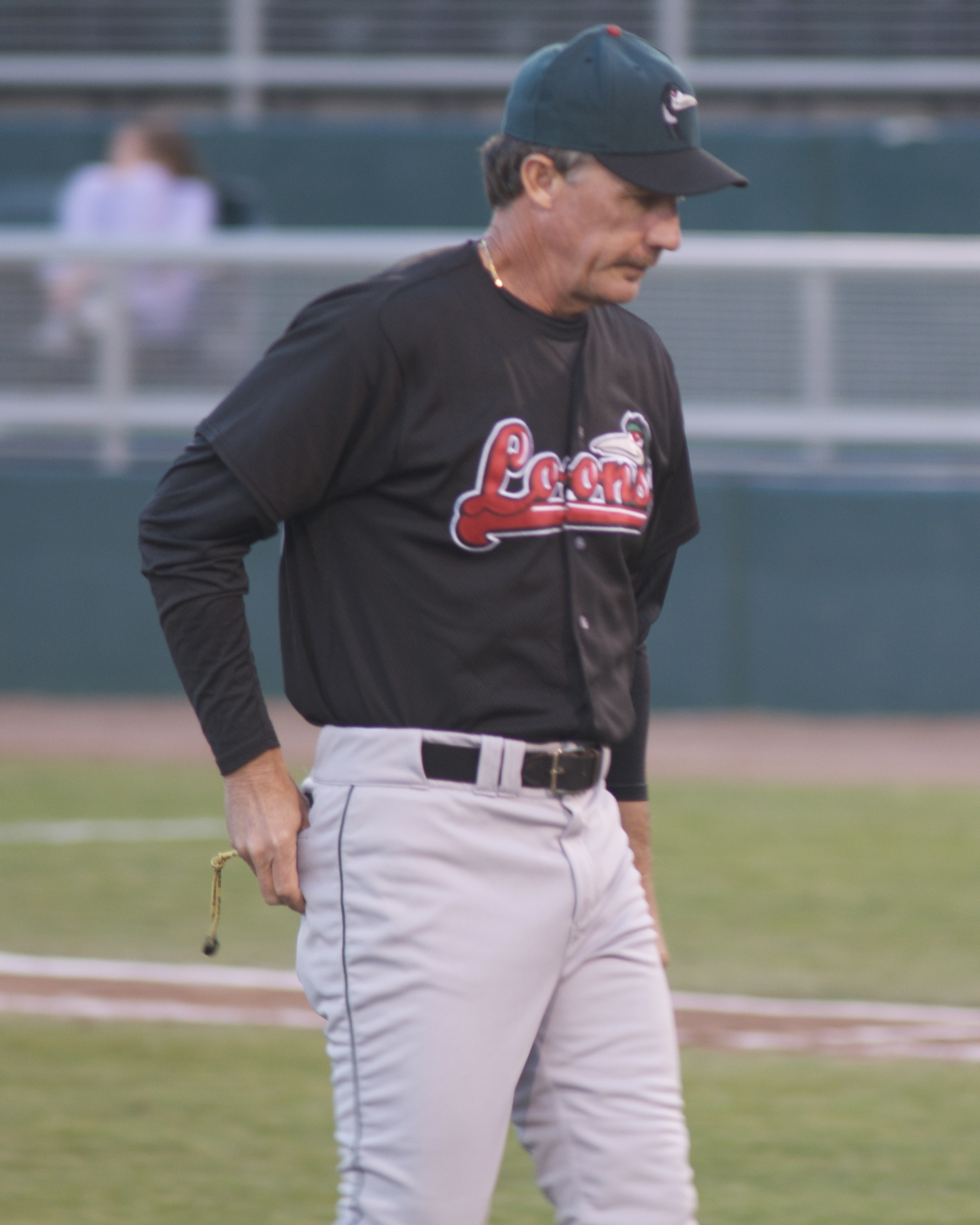
- Darwin as a pitching coach with the Great Lakes Loons in 2008
- Pitcher
- Born: October 25, 1955 (age 70); Bonham, Texas, U.S.
- Batted: Right Threw: Right

MLB debut
- September 8, 1978, for the Texas Rangers

Last MLB appearance
- September 22, 1998, for the San Francisco Giants

MLB statistics
- Win–loss record: 171–182
- Earned run average: 3.84
- Strikeouts: 1,942
- Stats at Baseball Reference

Teams
- Texas Rangers (1978–1984); Milwaukee Brewers (1985–1986); Houston Astros (1986–1990); Boston Red Sox (1991–1994); Toronto Blue Jays (1995); Texas Rangers (1995); Pittsburgh Pirates (1996); Houston Astros (1996); Chicago White Sox (1997); San Francisco Giants (1997–1998)

Career highlights and awards
- NL ERA leader (1990)

Danny Wayne Darwin (born October 25, 1955), known as "the Bonham Bullet", is an American professional baseball pitcher and coach, who played in Major League Baseball (MLB) for the Texas Rangers, Milwaukee Brewers, Houston Astros, Boston Red Sox, Toronto Blue Jays, Pittsburgh Pirates, Chicago White Sox, and San Francisco Giants, from 1978 through 1998. Over his MLB career, he amassed 171 wins and 182 losses, with a 3.84 earned run average (ERA).

== Playing career ==
Darwin attended Bonham High School and Grayson County College. He signed as an undrafted free agent with the Texas Rangers on May 10, 1976. He began his professional career with the Asheville Tourists in Single-A in 1976. He pitched for the Double-A Tulsa Drillers in 1977 and the Triple-A Tucson Toros in 1978. With Tulsa, he was 13–4, 2.41 ERA in 23 starts with six complete games and four shutouts.

Darwin made his major league debut with the Rangers on September 8, 1978. He pitched two innings of relief in an 11–4 loss against the Oakland Athletics, giving up one run and two hits. On September 24 of the same year, he made his first major league start against the Seattle Mariners. He pitched six innings, giving up eight hits, striking out seven, and allowing only one walk to record his first victory.

Darwin did not become a full-time starter until 1981, a strike-shortened season. He made 22 starts that year, carving out a 9–9 record with a 3.64 ERA.

Darwin pitched almost exclusively out of the bullpen in 1982, but returned to the Texas rotation the following year. He was traded to the Milwaukee Brewers on January 18, 1985, as part of a four-team deal with the Royals and Mets. Darwin made 29 starts for Milwaukee during the 1985 campaign, posting a record of 8–18.

Darwin was traded during the 1986 season to the Houston Astros for Mark Knudson and Don August. He had a stellar regular season, but Darwin never saw action as a postseason starter because he was being saved for a World Series bid (specifically Game 1) due to the Astros (managed by Hal Lanier) relying on a three-man trio of starters in Nolan Ryan, Mike Scott, and Bob Knepper; the Astros lost in the 1986 National League Championship Series to the New York Mets. As it turned out, Darwin would never pitch in a postseason game in his career despite being on a playoff roster. He remained with Houston through 1990, gradually being switched from a starting pitcher to a reliever by his last years with the Astros. In his final season in Houston, he was 11–4 with a 2.21 ERA in 48 games (17 starts) to win the National League ERA title.

Darwin signed a four-year contract with the Boston Red Sox worth up to $12.2 million in December 1990. He pitched as both a starter and a reliever for Boston. After leaving the Red Sox, Darwin had a shaky season in 1995, starting with the Toronto Blue Jays, but being cut midway through the season (with a 1–8 record and 7.62 ERA) and signing with the Texas Rangers again.

Darwin's return to Texas was short-lived, as he spent the last three years of his career bouncing around among teams. He signed with the Pittsburgh Pirates in 1996, who traded him back to the Astros at mid-season for Rich Loiselle. Darwin then signed with the Chicago White Sox in 1997, only to be dealt at the trade deadline to the San Francisco Giants as part of a multi-player deal that sent Wilson Álvarez and Roberto Hernández to the Giants and Keith Foulke, Bob Howry, Lorenzo Barceló, Mike Caruso, Ken Vining, and Brian Manning to the White Sox in what became known as the White Flag Trade. The Giants made the playoffs by winning the NL West, and Darwin was scheduled to start Game 4 of the National League Division Series against the Florida Marlins. However, the Giants lost in a sweep, which meant that Darwin had been in a playoff roster twice in his career but did not make a postseason appearance. He finished his career in 1998 with the Giants, with an 8–10 record and 5.51 ERA. In an April game against the Pirates, Darwin and Barry Bonds got into a heated argument after Bonds fielded a hit that drove in a run.

== Coaching career ==
Darwin was the pitching coach for the Jacksonville Suns in the Double-A Southern League from 2006 to 2007, the Class-A Great Lakes Loons from 2008 to 2009, and the Chattanooga Lookouts in 2010. In April 2018, Darwin became interim pitching coach for the Cincinnati Reds, promoted from Double-A Pensacola Blue Wahoos, where he was pitching coach for three seasons. In January 2019, Darwin returned to be the pitching coach for the Chattanooga Lookouts.

== Personal life ==
Danny's younger brother, Jeff Darwin, also had a professional pitching career. Jeff, who also graduated from Bonham High School, spent parts of three seasons in the majors, including 1996–1997 with the Chicago White Sox. Both Danny and Jeff were in the White Sox organization in 1997 but Danny was traded on July 31 and Jeff was not called up from the minors until August 17. In 1998, they were both with the Giants but Jeff spent the year in Triple-A. Their brother Kevin Darwin was twice drafted by MLB teams but did not play professionally due to arm injuries.

Rangers broadcaster Mark Holtz nicknamed Darwin "The Bonham Bullet" due to his hometown and fastball velocity. Nolan Ryan nicknamed Darwin "Dr. Death" for Darwin's glare at opposing players.

Darwin sponsored a celebrity golf tournament at North Central Texas College, where his brother Kevin worked.

== See also ==
- Houston Astros award winners and league leaders
- List of Major League Baseball annual ERA leaders
- List of Major League Baseball career strikeout leaders
