= Wilson Álvarez =

Venezuelan baseball player (born 1970)

- Pitcher
- Born: March 24, 1970 (age 56); Maracaibo, Zulia State, Venezuela
- Batted: Left Threw: Left

MLB debut
- July 24, 1989, for the Texas Rangers

Last MLB appearance
- September 28, 2005, for the Los Angeles Dodgers

MLB statistics
- Win–loss record: 102–92
- Earned run average: 3.96
- Strikeouts: 1,330
- Stats at Baseball Reference

Teams
- Texas Rangers (1989); Chicago White Sox (1991–1997); San Francisco Giants (1997); Tampa Bay Devil Rays (1998–1999, 2002); Los Angeles Dodgers (2003–2005)

Career highlights and awards
- All-Star (1994); Pitched no-hitter on August 11, 1991

Member of the Venezuelan

Baseball Hall of Fame
- Induction: 2011

Wilson Eduardo Álvarez Fuenmayor (born March 24, 1970) is a Venezuelan former professional baseball player. He played in Major League Baseball as a left-handed pitcher. During a thirteen-year baseball career, he pitched for the Texas Rangers, Chicago White Sox, San Francisco Giants, Tampa Bay Devil Rays, and Los Angeles Dodgers.

== Career ==
Born in Maracaibo, Venezuela, Alvarez represented his hometown in the 1982 Little League World Series, where they finished with a 2–1 record. Alvarez was signed by the Texas Rangers as an amateur free agent on September 23, 1986. He made his major league debut at the age of nineteen on July 24, 1989, the first player born in the 1970s to debut in MLB. Five days later, he was traded with Scott Fletcher and Sammy Sosa to the Chicago White Sox for Harold Baines and Fred Manrique. Alvarez provided one of the highlights of the 1991 Chicago White Sox season on August 11, pitching a no-hitter against the Baltimore Orioles at Memorial Stadium in his second Major League start. In his previous appearance, with the Rangers, he faced five batters and gave up two walks, a single and two home runs without retiring a batter, giving him an undefined career ERA prior to his no-hitter.

Between the majors, minors and winter league play, Alvarez pitched close to 300 innings in 1991; an extremely heavy workload. In 1993 he managed to break into the Sox starting pitching rotation permanently. That season, Alvarez won 15 games and finished second in the league in earned run average, but he experienced control problems and led the league with 122 walks.

In 1994, Alvarez went 12–8 and made the American League All-Star team. After a disappointing 8–11 in 1995, he had 15 wins and 181 strikeouts in 1996.

During the 1997 season, the White Sox traded Álvarez, Danny Darwin, and Roberto Hernández to the San Francisco Giants for six prospects (Keith Foulke, Bob Howry, Lorenzo Barceló, Mike Caruso, Ken Vining, and Brian Manning) in what became known as the White Flag Trade. A free agent after 1997, he signed a five-year contract with Tampa Bay. He was first in the team's starting rotation, and started Opening Day on March 31, 1998, throwing the Devil Rays' first ever pitch (a ball to Detroit's Brian L. Hunter).

In his first season with the Devil Rays Alvarez missed two months with tendonitis in his shoulder, eventually losing 14 games during the season. The following year he made two trips to the disabled list. Finally, he had arthroscopic shoulder surgery and missed the next two seasons. After finishing his contract with Tampa Bay, Álvarez signed with the Dodgers. He began the 2003 season as a starter for Triple-A Las Vegas. After going 5–1 with a 1.15 ERA, he filled the long relief role for the Dodgers at mid-season. Later he got a chance to start, collecting a 5–0 record and 1.06 ERA over a stretch of nine games. In 2004, he went 7–6 in 40 games (15 as a starter).

On August 1, 2005, Alvarez announced he would retire after the season. He compiled a career 102–92 record with 1330 strikeouts and a 3.96 ERA in 1747.2 innings.

In 2010, Álvarez was inducted into the Caribbean Baseball Hall of Fame.

After a brief stint as the pitching coach of the State College Spikes, Álvarez joined the Baltimore Orioles organization when he was named pitching coach of the Gulf Coast League Orioles in 2013. In June 2019, he was replaced as Orioles pitching coach.

== See also ==
- List of Major League Baseball no-hitters
- List of Major League Baseball single-inning strikeout leaders
- List of Major League Baseball players from Venezuela

Awards and achievements
Preceded by Dennis Martínez	No-hitter pitcher August 11, 1991	Succeeded by Bret Saberhagen
Preceded by none	Tampa Bay Devil Rays Opening Day; Starting pitcher 1998–1999	Succeeded by Steve Trachsel
