= White Flag Trade =

1997 Major League Baseball trade

The White Flag Trade was a trade made between two Major League Baseball teams in 1997. On July 31, 1997, the Chicago White Sox traded three veteran pitchers to the San Francisco Giants for six minor league players. At the time, the trade was maligned by the vast majority of White Sox fans, who saw it as a sign that owner Jerry Reinsdorf was giving up on the team, even while they were only 3 1/2 games behind the Cleveland Indians for the American League Central Division lead.

Reinsdorf defended the trade, saying that "anyone who thinks we can catch Cleveland is crazy", and the White Sox eventually finished 6 games out of 1st place in 1997. Although the team did win the Central Division title in 2000 with contributions from two of the players received in the trade, the trade remains one of the most contested in White Sox history.

== The trade ==
In 1997, the White Sox were a borderline playoff team struggling with fan relations as a result of the 1994 MLB strike. With diminished fan attendance and multiple players eligible to enter free agency at the end of the season, general manager Ron Schueler decided to trade them for prospects. Although the team was just 3 1/2 games behind the Cleveland Indians at the trade deadline, Schueler sent three of the team's best pitchers to the San Francisco Giants.

The San Francisco Giants received:

- Wilson Álvarez, left-handed starting pitcher
- Danny Darwin, right-handed starting pitcher
- Roberto Hernández, right-handed relief pitcher

The Chicago White Sox received:

- Keith Foulke, right-handed pitcher
- Bob Howry, right-handed pitcher
- Lorenzo Barceló, right-handed pitcher
- Ken Vining, left-handed pitcher
- Mike Caruso, shortstop
- Brian Manning, outfielder

== Aftermath ==
The San Francisco Giants went on to win the National League West Division title with a 90–72 record, two games better than the Los Angeles Dodgers. The Chicago White Sox finished 80–81, six games behind the American League Central Division champion Cleveland Indians. The Giants were swept by the Florida Marlins (now the Miami Marlins) in the National League Division Series. The Indians also lost to the Marlins in the World Series.

Wilson Álvarez and Roberto Hernández would both join the expansion Tampa Bay Devil Rays (now the Tampa Bay Rays) as free agents in the offseason and spend several years with the team, while Danny Darwin would pitch one more season for the Giants before retiring in 1998.

In 2000, the White Sox won the American League Central with an American League-best record of 95–67. They made the playoffs but were swept in the Division Series by the American League wild card team, the Seattle Mariners. Foulke and Howry were a large part of their bullpen, with Foulke earning 34 saves in his role as closer. However, the middle of the batting order went a combined 3-for-40 in the series, and the Sox were swept in three games. The 2000 San Francisco Giants also won their division, with an MLB-best record of 97–65. However, none of the players acquired from the 1997 trade were still playing with the team during the 2000 season. The Giants also lost in the Division Series, this time to the New York Mets who went on to lose to the New York Yankees in the World Series.

Keith Foulke played in MLB until the 2008 season, after which he played one more season for the Newark Bears of the independent Atlantic League before retiring at the end of 2009. On December 8, 2008, Howry reunited with the Giants, signing a one-year contract. Manning never made it to the major leagues, and Vining only played 8 games with the White Sox during his Major League career. Shortstop Mike Caruso showed signs of being a solid hitter, batting .306 his rookie year, but was a poor fielder.

== Legacy ==
Fans heavily criticized the decision to trade, believing the owner and general manager had given up on a potentially successful team. The trade widened the rift between supporters and ownership, particularly when Reinsdorf told Chicago Sun-Times reporter Toni Ginnetti that "anyone who thinks we can catch Cleveland is crazy". Baseball historians and pundits have called the trade "infamous" because of the optics of trading away veterans while so close to the division lead, and it is still cited as one of the most notable trades in White Sox history.

However, player reaction was more varied. While Darwin said he had "never seen ... an owner say that he was giving up on his ballclub", shortstop Ozzie Guillén pointed out that low fan support was a factor in the trade. Years later, Howry said in an interview that he was oblivious to the negative publicity surrounding the trade at the time, and was not even aware that it had been dubbed the "White Flag Trade" until almost 2 years later, just prior to the 1999 season. Howry viewed the trade as a positive force in his own career, as there was no pressure to perform when he arrived on the White Sox, and he felt that environment helped the young players on the team develop into eventual division champions. "I was 23 years old," he said. "I was just like, okay, I'm still playing, I got a place to play."

Some baseball writers have pointed out that the trade showed Reinsdorf was simply ahead of his time, as it has become more common since 1997 for teams seemingly in contention to decide to build for the future, rather than gamble on a long-shot bid for a title. Chicago Tribune columnist Paul Sullivan wrote in 2020 that Reinsdorf and his GM avoided a prolonged outcry over the trade, partly due to the fact that social media was not omnipresent in 1997. The term "white flag trade" is sometimes applied to other team's choices to rebuild in the face of losing future free agents for nothing.

== See also ==
- Brock for Broglio
- Herschel Walker trade
- Eric Lindros trade
- Ricky Williams trade
- Deshaun Watson trade
- Luka Dončić–Anthony Davis trade
