= Mike Caruso (baseball) =

American baseball player (born 1977)

- Shortstop
- Born: May 27, 1977 (age 49); Queens, New York, U.S.
- Batted: Left Threw: Right

MLB debut
- March 31, 1998, for the Chicago White Sox

Last MLB appearance
- August 9, 2002, for the Kansas City Royals

MLB statistics
- Batting average: .274
- Home runs: 7
- Runs batted in: 90
- Stats at Baseball Reference

Teams
- Chicago White Sox (1998–1999); Kansas City Royals (2002)

Michael John Caruso (born May 27, 1977) is an American former Major League Baseball shortstop who played for the Chicago White Sox and Kansas City Royals.

Caruso was a prospect for the San Francisco Giants drafted out of Marjory Stoneman Douglas High School in Parkland, Florida in 1996. During the 1997 season, Caruso was one of six prospects (along with Keith Foulke, Bob Howry, Lorenzo Barceló, Ken Vining, and Brian Manning) traded to the White Sox in exchange for Wilson Álvarez, Danny Darwin, and Roberto Hernández in what became known as the White Flag Trade.

In 1998, Caruso was called up by the White Sox at the age of 20 to become their everyday starting shortstop. He finished third in the Major League Baseball Rookie of the Year Award balloting. However, his career in Chicago only lasted two years. He reemerged back into the Major Leagues in 2002 with the Royals, but only played in 12 games.

After two years out of the game, Caruso began a comeback attempt. He played the 2007 season for the South Georgia Peanuts of the independent South Coast League. However, the South Coast League only lasted one season before suspending operations. He then played for the Joliet JackHammers.
