= Miguel Asencio =

Dominican baseball player (born 1980)

- Pitcher
- Born: September 29, 1980 (age 44); Villa Mella, Dominican Republic
- Batted: Right Threw: Right

MLB debut
- April 6, 2002, for the Kansas City Royals

Last MLB appearance
- April 29, 2006, for the Colorado Rockies

MLB statistics
- Win–loss record: 7–8
- Earned run average: 5.12
- Strikeouts: 92
- Stats at Baseball Reference

Teams
- Kansas City Royals (2002–2003); Colorado Rockies (2006)

Miguel DePaula Asencio (born September 29, 1980) is a Dominican former Major League Baseball pitcher. He began his professional career in 1998 in the Dominican Republic. In 11 games, he went 0–2 with a 6.55 ERA.

Asencio was signed by the Philadelphia Phillies as an amateur free agent on July 2, 1998. He pitched for the Gulf Coast Phillies in 1999 going 1–4 with an ERA of 5.97. Miguel split the 2000 season between Clearwater and Batavia. Asencio held opponents to a .224 batting average while at Clearwater and a .191 average at Batavia. He continued to pitch for Clearwater during the 2001 season posting 12–5 record with an ERA of 2.84. Asencio was named to the Florida State League All-Star Team and was the FSL player of the week from July 16–22.

The Kansas City Royals acquired him in the 2002 Rule 5 Draft. Miguel spent the entire year with the club compiling a 4–7 record and an ERA of 5.11. His Major League debut in relief versus the Chicago White Sox on April 6, 2002, was inauspicious as his first 16 pitches (including a wild pitch to the third batter), were out of the strike zone, forcing in a run before he even threw his first Major League strike. He was subsequently removed after throwing 16 consecutive balls. Due to an injury shortened season, he only started eight times for the Royals in 2003. He spent the 2004 season recovering from Tommy John surgery. The San Diego Padres signed Asencio in 2005. His stint with the Padres did not last long, as he was released in June later that year. The Colorado Rockies signed him in 2006. Asencio only appeared in three games for the Rockies going 1–0 with a 4.70 ERA. The Houston Astros acquired Asencio in a trade on December 12, 2006. In September 2007, Asencio was designated for assignment. In January 2008, Asencio signed a minor league contract with the Boston Red Sox and became a free agent after the season.
