= Keith Foulke =

American baseball player (born 1972)

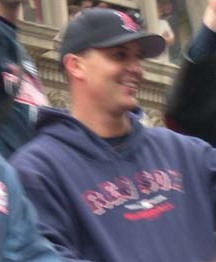
- Foulke in 2004
- Pitcher
- Born: October 19, 1972 (age 53); Ellsworth Air Force Base, South Dakota, U.S.
- Batted: Right Threw: Right

MLB debut
- May 21, 1997, for the San Francisco Giants

Last MLB appearance
- September 18, 2008, for the Oakland Athletics

MLB statistics
- Win–loss record: 41–37
- Earned run average: 3.33
- Strikeouts: 718
- Saves: 191
- Stats at Baseball Reference

Teams
- San Francisco Giants (1997); Chicago White Sox (1997–2002); Oakland Athletics (2003); Boston Red Sox (2004–2006); Oakland Athletics (2008)

Career highlights and awards
- All-Star (2003); World Series champion (2004); AL Rolaids Relief Man Award (2003); AL saves leader (2003)

Keith Charles Foulke (/foʊk/ FOHK; born October 19, 1972) is an American professional baseball manager and former Major League Baseball relief pitcher who was the first manager of the Boston Hunters of the Women's Pro Baseball League (WPBL). A graduate of Hargrave High School in Huffman, Texas, Foulke attended Galveston College and Lewis–Clark State College. Between 1997 and 2008, he pitched for the San Francisco Giants, Chicago White Sox, Oakland Athletics, Boston Red Sox and Cleveland Indians. Foulke was an All-Star in 2003 and he earned the save in the final game of the 2004 World Series.

== Career ==
After graduating from Hargrave High School in Huffman, Texas, in 1991, he attended Galveston College and Lewis–Clark State College in Idaho. He began his career in the minor-league system of the San Francisco Giants. During the 1997 season, Foulke was one of six prospects (along with Bob Howry, Lorenzo Barceló, Mike Caruso, Ken Vining, and Brian Manning) traded to the White Sox in exchange for Wilson Álvarez, Danny Darwin, and Roberto Hernández in what became known as the White Flag Trade.

In 1998, Foulke found a home in the White Sox bullpen, primarily serving as set-up man for closers Matt Karchner (who was traded to the Chicago Cubs in the middle of the season) and Bill Simas. In 1999, Foulke established himself as one of the league's best relief pitchers, posting a 2.22 ERA in 105.1 innings of work over 67 games, however, he was still used primarily as a set-up man. His stellar season even netted him a vote for the 1999 AL Cy Young Award.

In 2000, Foulke again was an important piece of the White Sox bullpen. Though Bob Howry entered the season as the team's primary closer, Foulke was seeing more and more time closing out games, and by April's end he had recorded 4 saves (in 1999, he didn't notch a save until June). As Howry continued to struggle, Foulke inherited the closer's role and flourished, saving 34 games for the White Sox in 2000, and was a major reason the White Sox won the AL Central title.

On December 3, 2002, Foulke, along with catcher Mark Johnson, minor league pitcher Joe Valentine, and cash, was traded by the White Sox to the Oakland Athletics for closer Billy Koch and two minor leaguers. During the 2003 season with the Athletics, Foulke would distinguish himself as a closer, leading the league in saves and games finished, being named to the All-Star team and winning the American League Rolaids Relief Man of the Year Award. However, it was Foulke who also gave up the game-winning double to David Ortiz in Game 4 of the American League Division Series that year.

Foulke was granted free agency on October 27, 2003, and signed with the Boston Red Sox.

=== 2004 ===
Foulke continued his dominance in his first year with the Red Sox, saving 32 games in 39 opportunities while racking up 79 strikeouts and a 2.17 ERA across 83 innings. In the 2004 postseason, Foulke appeared in 11 of 14 games, throwing 257 pitches over 14 innings. He would rack up 19 strikeouts and over the entire stretch would only allow exactly one earned run. While Foulke was marvelous (1.80 ERA) in the World Series, his most crucial work was in the American League Championship Series against the Yankees, when he pitched in five games and didn't allow a run. With the Red Sox down, 3–0, in the series, Foulke threw 100 pitches over the next three days to help his team force Game 7. Foulke was on the mound when the final out was made in the 2004 World Series. He induced Édgar Rentería (who would be his teammate the next season) of the St. Louis Cardinals to hit a one-bounce ground ball back to him which he flipped to first, thus clinching the Red Sox' first World Series Championship since 1918, ending the Curse of the Bambino. Fox commentator Joe Buck famously called the grounder with:

Back to Foulke. Red Sox fans have longed to hear it: The Boston Red Sox are World Champions!

For the first half of the 2004 season, Foulke wore his Red Sox cap with an American flag patch on it to show support for American troops in Iraq. In July 2004, Foulke agreed to remove the flag patch to comply with MLB rules prohibiting individual players from altering their team's uniform.

=== 2005 ===
Despite being the hero of the previous postseason, Foulke struggled to keep his job as closer as he battled knee injuries throughout 2005. His ERA ballooned to over 5.00 and he eventually lost the role of closer to Mike Timlin.

==== "Johnny from Burger King" ====
On June 28, 2005, after struggling with injuries and a 6.03 ERA to that point, Foulke lashed out at Red Sox fans, who were booing him.

"They're not going to make it any harder than it is for me to go home and look in the mirror", Foulke said about the booing that rained down from the stands on a sticky night in the Fens. "Like I've told you guys plenty of times, I'm more embarrassed to walk into this locker room and look at the faces of my teammates than I am to walk out and see Johnny from Burger King booing me. I'm worried about these guys, not everybody else."

Foulke's perceived lack of respect for Red Sox fans made him a target for both fans and the Boston media alike. His baseball heart was also questioned because he said he did not care if he was a closer, but clarified, "I love to pitch. I don't care if I pitch in the second inning, the fourth inning, the ninth inning, the 10th inning. I didn't ask to be a closer. It's just the job that I do." The media also had a field day when they found out that Foulke demanded a new truck as compensation for his weekly interviews with Dale & Holley on WEEI.

=== 2006 ===
The Red Sox had high expectations for Foulke in 2006, after two knee surgeries in the offseason. Manager Terry Francona was hoping to put Foulke back in the closer role, but after an inconsistent spring and early regular season games, Francona was quick to go to Jonathan Papelbon as the closer. Foulke pitched mainly as one of the team's middle relievers, along with Mike Timlin, Julián Tavárez, and Rudy Seánez. Foulke continued to struggle, with an ERA of 5.63. On June 12, 2006, Foulke was put on the disabled list with right elbow tendinitis. Foulke was activated from the 15-day DL on August 18. In November 2006, Foulke opted for free agency.

=== 2007 ===
Foulke signed a one-year deal (with an option for a second year) with the Cleveland Indians for the 2007 season after passing a physical in January. However, Foulke announced his retirement on February 16, 2007, before ever putting on an Indians uniform. He cited pains in his elbow and injuries from the previous two seasons as the primary reason for ending his ten-year career. Pitchers and catchers reported one day earlier and the first spring workout was not scheduled until February 17. The announcement came as a shock to most people, as Foulke was slated to compete with Joe Borowski to fill the vacant closer's role.

=== 2008 ===
On February 8, 2008, Foulke returned from retirement and signed a one-year contract with the Oakland Athletics, for whom he had previously closed in 2003.

=== 2009 ===
Foulke played for the Newark Bears in the Atlantic League of Professional Baseball.

== Scouting report ==
From 2000 to 2004, Foulke was one of the top closers in baseball. At the peak of his career, he had an effective 87–91 MPH fastball and what many people considered to be one of the best circle changeups in the sport (which he could get down to 76 MPH, making for a 12–14 MPH difference in the two, a sign of a good changeup.) However, later in his career, his fastball ranged from 84–86 MPH while his changeup remained at 76 MPH. While solid against right-handed hitters, he is particularly lethal against lefties. His strikeout pitch is usually an inside circle changeup.

Foulke had good control, as evidenced by his career strikeout-to-walk ratio of 3.70. While he did not hold runners on base particularly well, he covered his position adequately and threw accurately to the bases. In 2004, he completed a fifth straight season without committing an error (71 total chances in 307 games). In addition, his unusual throwing motion provided him with the ability to mask his changeup well, though runners on base could easily see his grip from his exposed hand and potentially tip his pitches to teammates at bat.

== Personal life ==
Foulke's son Kade was raised in Florida and played both hockey and baseball before choosing to focus on the latter sport during high school. Before honoring his commitment to play college baseball at Galveston College, Kade Foulke played for the Brockton Rox.

Foulke's father served in the United States Air Force.

== See also ==
- List of Major League Baseball annual saves leaders
