= Bob Howry =

American baseball player (born 1973)

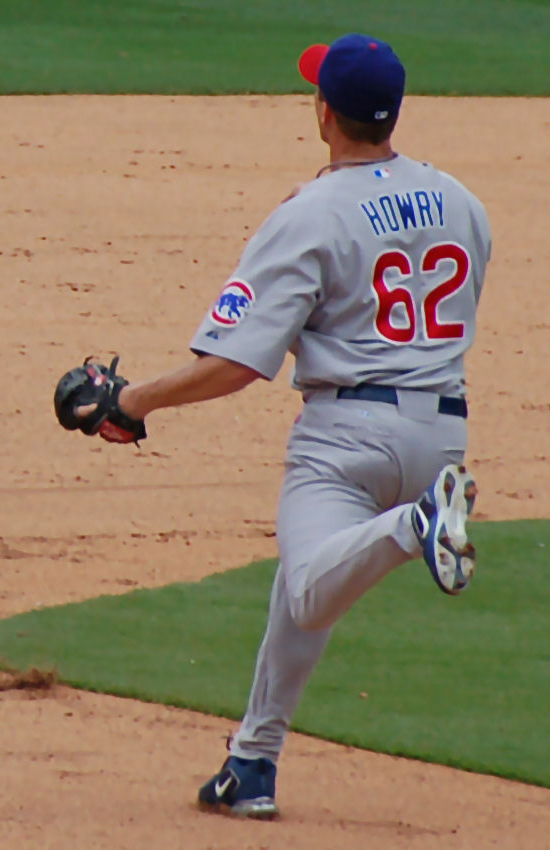
- Howry with the Chicago Cubs in 2007
- Pitcher
- Born: August 4, 1973 (age 52); Phoenix, Arizona, U.S.
- Batted: Left Threw: Right

MLB debut
- June 21, 1998, for the Chicago White Sox

Last MLB appearance
- July 28, 2010, for the Chicago Cubs

MLB statistics
- Win–loss record: 45–52
- Earned run average: 3.84
- Strikeouts: 653
- Stats at Baseball Reference

Teams
- Chicago White Sox (1998–2002); Boston Red Sox (2002–2003); Cleveland Indians (2004–2005); Chicago Cubs (2006–2008); San Francisco Giants (2009); Arizona Diamondbacks (2010); Chicago Cubs (2010)

Bobby Dean Howry (born August 4, 1973) is an American former professional baseball relief pitcher.

== Early life ==
Howry attended, and played baseball at Deer Valley High School in Arizona, then he attended McNeese State University and was drafted by the San Francisco Giants in the fifth round of the 1994 Major League Baseball draft.

== Baseball career ==
During the 1997 season, Howry was one of six prospects (along with Keith Foulke, Lorenzo Barceló, Mike Caruso, Ken Vining, and Brian Manning) traded to the White Sox in exchange for Wilson Álvarez, Danny Darwin, and Roberto Hernández in what became known as the White Flag Trade.

He made his major league debut with the Chicago White Sox in 1998 and served as the team's closer, saving 28 games in 1999 until being replaced by Keith Foulke in early May 2000. He was dealt to the Boston Red Sox in 2002, but suffered right elbow problems that forced him to be put on the 60-day disabled list in late 2003. Howry successfully recovered from right elbow surgery and made a comeback with the Cleveland Indians in 2004. In a year and a half with the Indians, Howry posted an 11–6 record with 87 strikeouts and a 2.61 ERA.

In late 2005, Howry signed a three-year, $12 million deal with the Chicago Cubs. Facing the Colorado Rockies on June 24, 2007, he gave up a three-run home run to Troy Tulowitzki in the ninth that capped a six-run comeback to put the Rockies ahead 9–8. After the home run, a fan ran on the field, getting tackled as he neared the pitcher's mound. According to Howry, the fan asked him, "What are you doing?" Howry responded by saying "I'm trying to give up home runs, what do you think?" The Cubs won 10–9 on a two-RBI single by Alfonso Soriano in the bottom of the inning. Howry filled in for an injured Ryan Dempster during the 2007 playoff run, earning eight saves with a 3.32 ERA, and was one of the Cubs' primary relievers in 2008, sometimes serving as setup man to All-Star closer Kerry Wood.

He is one of four pitchers who have pitched in at least 70 games each of the four seasons from 2004 to 2008, the others being Scott Schoeneweis (who has done so for five seasons), Chad Qualls, and Dan Wheeler.

After the Cubs declined arbitration, Howry signed a $2.75 million, one-year contract with the San Francisco Giants on December 3, 2008.

On December 28, 2009, Howry signed a one-year deal with the Arizona Diamondbacks with a club option for 2011.

On May 17, 2010, he was released by the Arizona Diamondbacks to make room for recently acquired Saul Rivera.

On May 21, Howry re-signed with the Cubs.

On July 30, 2010, the Cubs released Howry. During his brief return to the Cubs in 2010, he was 0–3 with a 5.66 ERA in 24 relief appearances. Howry was released to make room for pitcher Carlos Zambrano, who was returning to the team from suspension.

On February 27, 2011, Howry retired.
