= Lorenzo Barceló =

Dominican baseball player (born 1977)

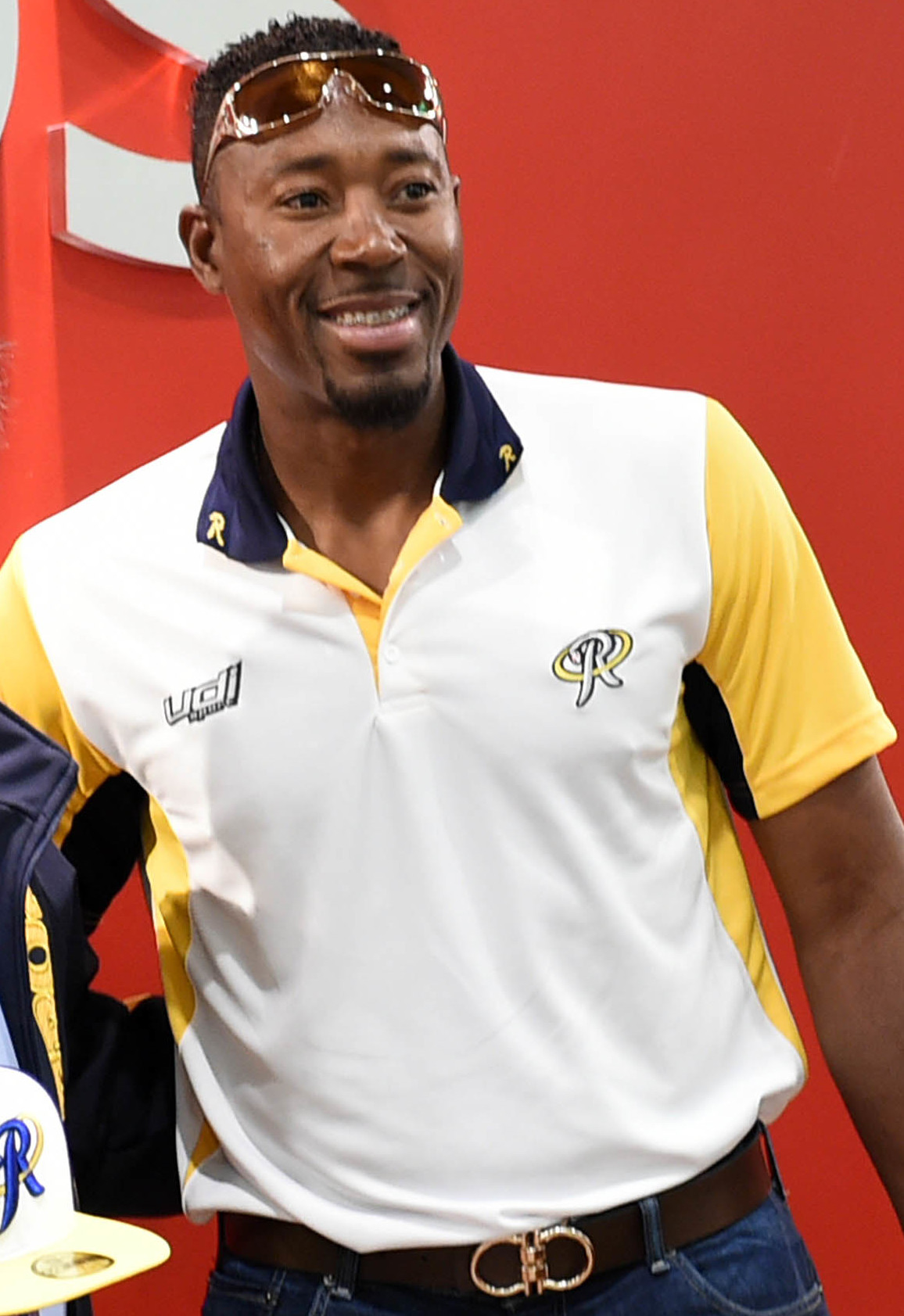
- Barceló with Rieleros de Aguascalientes in 2016
- Pitcher
- Born: August 10, 1977 (age 49); San Pedro de Macorís, Dominican Republic
- Batted: Right Threw: Right

Professional debut
- MLB: July 22, 2000, for the Chicago White Sox
- CPBL: March 20, 2007, for the Chinatrust Whales

Last appearance
- MLB: April 19, 2002, for the Chicago White Sox
- CPBL: September 17, 2008, for the Chinatrust Whales

MLB statistics
- Win–loss record: 5–3
- Earned run average: 4.50
- Strikeouts: 42

CPBL statistics
- Win–loss record: 9–11
- Earned run average: 3.38
- Strikeouts: 165
- Stats at Baseball Reference

Teams
- Chicago White Sox (2000–2002); Chinatrust Whales (2007–2008)
Medals
Men's baseball
Representing Dominican Republic
World Baseball Classic
Gold medal – first place	2013 San Francisco	Team

Lorenzo Barceló (born August 10, 1977) is a Dominican former professional baseball pitcher. He played for the Chicago White Sox from 2000–2002.

== Career ==
=== MLB career ===
==== San Francisco Giants ====
Barceló was originally signed by the San Francisco Giants as an amateur free agent on May 23, 1994, out of San Pedro de Macorís in the Dominican Republic. In the Giants farm system, he pitched for the Bellingham Giants, Burlington Bees, San Jose Giants and Shreveport Captains.

==== Chicago White Sox ====
On July 31, 1997, he was traded to the Chicago White Sox (along with Mike Caruso, Keith Foulke, Bob Howry, Ken Vining and Brian Manning) in exchange for Wilson Álvarez, Danny Darwin and Roberto Hernández. This trade became known as the White Flag Trade.

He made his Major League debut for the White Sox on July 22, 2000, against the Boston Red Sox, allowing 2 runs in 2.3 innings. He made his first start on August 8, 2000, against the Seattle Mariners, allowing 5 runs in 4 innings.

Barceló recorded his first win in a 3.1 inning relief appearance against the Baltimore Orioles on August 23, 2000. He finished the 2000 season with a 4–2 record and 3.69 ERA in 22 appearances (only the 1 start). He made 17 appearances in 2001 and was 1–0 with a 4.71 ERA and in 2002 he made 4 appearances and was 0–1 with a 9.00 ERA. He pitched 1.2 innings in the 2000 American League Division Series against the Mariners, and did not allow a run.

==== Second stint with San Francisco Giants ====
He returned to the Giants as a minor league free agent in 2003. He played for the AAA Fresno Grizzlies, pitching 20 games with a 6.49 ERA. After the season, Barceló was released by the Giants, and he decided to retire from baseball.

==== Los Angeles Dodgers ====
He signed a minor league contract with the Los Angeles Dodgers on September 1, 2012, and was assigned to the AAA Albuquerque Isotopes, his first affiliated baseball appearance since 2003. Since he arrived so late in the season, he only appeared in 1 regular season game for the Isotopes, allowing 2 runs in 3 innings. He also participated in the Pacific Coast League playoffs.

=== Independent and foreign league careers ===
Barceló made a comeback in 2009 to play for the Tucson Toros in the Golden Baseball League. He also played for the York Revolution of the Atlantic League of Professional Baseball in 2011 and played for the Pericos de Puebla in the Mexican League from 2010 to 2012. In 2012, he also played for the Rojos del Águila de Veracruz. He spent parts of the 2014 & 2015 seasons with the Rieleros de Aguascalientes before he was released on April 1, 2015.

On August 2, 2018, Barceló signed with the Long Island Ducks of the Atlantic League of Professional Baseball. He became a free agent following the 2018 season.
