= Roberto Hernández (relief pitcher) =

Puerto Rican baseball player (born 1964)

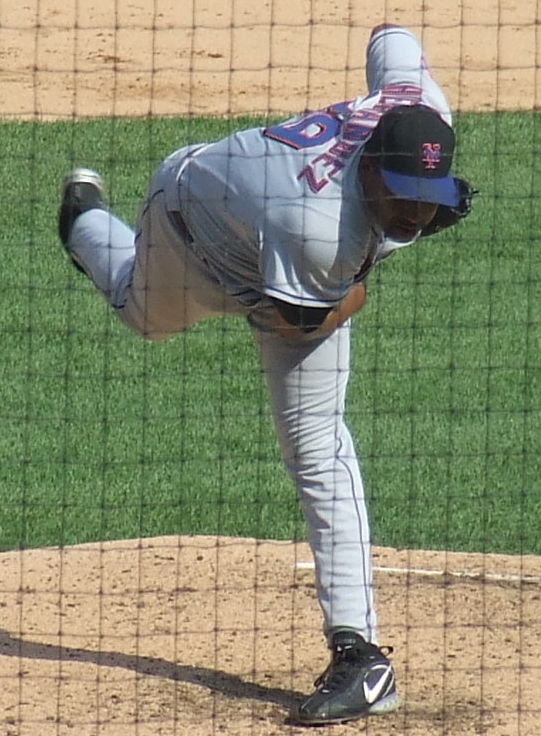
- Hernández with the New York Mets in 2006
- Pitcher
- Born: November 11, 1964 (age 61); Santurce, Puerto Rico
- Batted: Right Threw: Right

MLB debut
- September 2, 1991, for the Chicago White Sox

Last MLB appearance
- September 25, 2007, for the Los Angeles Dodgers

MLB statistics
- Games pitched: 1,010
- Win–loss record: 67–71
- Earned run average: 3.45
- Strikeouts: 945
- Saves: 326
- Stats at Baseball Reference

Teams
- Chicago White Sox (1991–1997); San Francisco Giants (1997); Tampa Bay Devil Rays (1998–2000); Kansas City Royals (2001–2002); Atlanta Braves (2003); Philadelphia Phillies (2004); New York Mets (2005); Pittsburgh Pirates (2006); New York Mets (2006); Cleveland Indians (2007); Los Angeles Dodgers (2007)

Career highlights and awards
- 2× All-Star (1996, 1999)

Roberto Manuel Hernández Rodríguez (born November 11, 1964) is a Puerto Rican former professional baseball right-handed relief pitcher. His best Major League Baseball (MLB) seasons came with the Chicago White Sox and Tampa Bay Devil Rays, in the 1990s. In all, Hernández played for 10 different big league teams, over 17 seasons.

== Early life ==
Roberto Manuel Hernández was born November 11, 1964, in Puerto Rico. His father moved his family to the Dominican Republic where his father was originally from. At age 2, his family moved again to New York City.

Hernández attended the Chelsea Vocational School in Manhattan where he played baseball for three years. During his junior year of high school, he and his brother were forced to drop out due to the fact that is mother was sick and his father was laid off from his job. He assisted his family for a year, then was offered a scholarship at the New Hampton School, a private school in New Hampshire where he repeated his junior year and completed his senior year of high school while continuing to play baseball.

== Amateur career ==
In the fall of 1984, Hernández attended the University of Connecticut to play baseball for the Huskies and was named the starting catcher in the spring of 1985. Following the 1985 college season, he played in a summer league in Virginia. He was the only catcher on the team but he desired to pitch. The coach told him he would get the opportunity to pitch if they found another catcher. In his first start, he pitched against a team from Madison and struck out 14 batters. He then pitched against North Carolina, East Carolina and finally against Elon but wouldn’t pitch again and caught mostly every game the rest of the summer.

Hernández hoped to return to UConn in the fall of 1985 and pitch; However, he had difficulty contacting the coach during the summer. Hernández then made the decision to transfer. He hoped to attend the University of South Carolina but he could not get a letter of consent. Had he signed, he would have been forced to sit out a season, which would have hurt his chances of being drafted the following year. Larry Carr, the pitching coach at Coastal Carolina, had seen Hernández pitch and called the pitching coach at USC Aiken (USCA) and told him to offer Hernández a scholarship.

Hernández enrolled at USCA without having visited in the hope that he could pitch there during the 1986 season and prepare for the draft. He hurt his arm pitching in the fall and would undergo surgery to remove bone chips from his elbow. Once he recovered from surgery, he pitched well in the spring. Every time he began warming up for a game he would notice that 10-15 scouts would be watching him with a radar gun. Hernández’s success in the 1986 season helped put USCA on the map for professional scouts. The school would later refurbish and rename their baseball field after him.

== Professional career ==
Hernández was selected by the California Angels as the 16th pick in the first round of the 1986 amateur draft. He was traded to the Chicago White Sox in 1989. In 1991, while pitching for the Vancouver Canadians of the Pacific Coast League, Hernández experienced numbness in his pitching hand, later determined to be caused by blood clots. He was rushed into emergency surgery to have veins transplanted from his inner thigh to his forearm. The surgery was successful and he went on to make his major league debut as a starting pitcher against the Kansas City Royals on September 2 of that year.

Hernández had a long and largely successful career as a relief pitcher in the major leagues. In 1993, he was instrumental in the White Sox' drive for the American League West Division pennant, going 2–1 with 21 saves in the second half of the season. He made four appearances in the American League Championship Series that year and pitched four scoreless innings.

During the 1997 season, the White Sox traded Hernández, Wilson Álvarez, and Danny Darwin, to the San Francisco Giants for six prospects (Keith Foulke, Bob Howry, Lorenzo Barceló, Mike Caruso, Ken Vining, and Brian Manning in what became known as the White Flag Trade. He appeared in all three games of the National League Division Series against the Florida Marlins. After the season, he signed as a free agent with the Tampa Bay Devil Rays. In 1999, he earned his career-high of 43 saves which was a Devil Rays team record until 2010. Despite his 43 saves, the team only won 69 games overall.

His performance level declined after being traded to the Kansas City Royals prior to the 2001 season. He went on to sign as a free agent with the Atlanta Braves in 2003, the Philadelphia Phillies in 2004, and the New York Mets in 2005. After 2002, he moved from being a closer to being a setup man, in which role he generally flourished. He signed a one-year contract with the Pittsburgh Pirates for the 2006 season. On July 31, 2006, Hernández was reacquired by the Mets along with pitcher Óliver Pérez for outfielder Xavier Nady.

On December 2, 2006, Hernández signed a one-year, $3.5 million contract with the Cleveland Indians for the 2007 season with a $3.7 million club option for 2008. Coming out of spring training, he and Rafael Betancourt were the Indians' primary right-handed eighth-inning relievers. But Hernández pitched poorly over the first three months of the season (6.23 ERA in 28 games) and eventually lost the confidence of manager Eric Wedge. He was designated for assignment June 20 and waived for the purposes of giving him his unconditional release on June 28.

Hernández was signed to a minor league contract by the Los Angeles Dodgers on July 7, 2007, and, after pitching in one game for the Triple-A Las Vegas 51s, was recalled to the Dodgers on July 18.

On August 16, 2007, Hernández appeared in his 1,000th game against the Houston Astros. He became the 11th pitcher in major league baseball history to appear in 1,000 career games.

In addition to his MLB career, Hernández played in the Puerto Rican Winter League from 1987 to 1996 with the Mayaguez Indians.

== Personal life ==
Hernández is married with four children and resides in Gulfport, Florida. His son, Roberto Jr., attended USCA as a member of the baseball team, playing at the stadium named for his father.

== See also ==
- List of players from Puerto Rico in MLB
- Career Leaders in Games Finished
- Major League Baseball titles leaders
