= Mike Porzio =

American baseball player (born 1972)

- Pitcher
- Born: August 20, 1972 (age 53); Waterbury, Connecticut, U.S.
- Batted: Left Threw: Left

MLB debut
- July 9, 1999, for the Colorado Rockies

Last MLB appearance
- July 26, 2003, for the Chicago White Sox

MLB statistics
- Win–loss record: 3–3
- Earned run average: 5.90
- Strikeouts: 52
- Stats at Baseball Reference

Teams
- Colorado Rockies (1999); Chicago White Sox (2002–2003)

Lawrence Michael Porzio (born August 20, 1972) is an American former pitcher in Major League Baseball who played for the Colorado Rockies and Chicago White Sox in parts of three seasons spanning 1999–2003. He last pitched professionally in 2008 for the Bridgeport Bluefish of the independent Atlantic League.
