= 2015 Milwaukee Brewers season =

2015 Milwaukee Brewers
- League: National League
- Division: Central
- Ballpark: Miller Park
- City: Milwaukee, Wisconsin
- Record: 68–94 (.420)
- Divisional place: 4th
- Owners: Mark Attanasio
- General managers: Doug Melvin
- Managers: Ron Roenicke, Craig Counsell
- Television: Fox Sports Wisconsin (Brian Anderson, Bill Schroeder, Craig Coshun, Matt Lepay, Telly Hughes, Jeff Grayson, Sophia Minnaert); WYTU-LD (Spanish-language coverage, Sunday home games; Hector Molina, Kevin Holden)
- Radio: 620 WTMJ (Bob Uecker, Joe Block, Jeff Levering); 1510 ESPN Deportes (Spanish-language coverage, select daytime games; Andy Olivares)
- Stats: ESPN.com; Baseball Reference

The 2015 Milwaukee Brewers season was the 46th season for the Brewers in Milwaukee, the 18th in the National League, and 47th overall. They finished fourth in the National League Central. On May 3 after starting the season 7–18, Ron Roenicke was fired as manager and replaced with Craig Counsell.

== Offseason ==
- October 30: Francisco Rodríguez, Mark Reynolds, Lyle Overbay, Tom Gorzelanny, and Zach Duke become free agents.
- Reynolds signed with the St. Louis Cardinals.
- Gorzelanny signed with the Detroit Tigers.
- Duke signed with the Chicago White Sox.
- October 31: Claimed Juan Centeno off waivers from the New York Mets.
- November 1: Received Adam Lind from the Toronto Blue Jays for Marco Estrada.
- November 7: Released Miguel De Los Santos and signed Jeremy Hermida and Pete Orr to minor leagues contracts and invited Orr to spring training.
- November 14: Received Kyle Wren from the Atlanta Braves for Zach Quintana and signed Jaye Chapman.
- November 18: Signed John Ely to a minor league contract.
- November 20: Promoted 4 players from the minors.
- November 25: Sent Ariel Pena to the minors and signed Nick Additon to a minor league contract.
- November 29: Signed Brent Leach to a minor league contract and invited him to spring training.
- December 2-December 17: Signed 4 players to a minor league contract and invited 1 of them to spring training.
- December 18: Received Matt Long and Jarrett Martin from the Los Angeles Dodgers for Shawn Zarraga.
- December 23: Claimed Shane Peterson off waivers from the Chicago Cubs.
- January 5: Signed Nevin Ashley to a minor league contract and invited him to spring training.
- January 19: Received Corey Knebel, Luis Sardinas, and Marcos Diplan from the Texas Rangers for Yovani Gallardo and cash. Also sent Hunter Morris to the minors.
- January 21: Signed Dontrelle Willis to a minor league contract and invited him to spring training.
- January 26: Invited 8 players to spring training.
- January 29: Signed Hiram Burgos to a minor league contract.
- January 30: Signed Neal Cotts and sent Elian Herrera to the minors.
- February 2: Signed Beau Wallace to a minor league contract.
- February 5: Signed Chris Perez to a minor league contract and invited him to spring training.

== Regular season ==
=== Season standings ===
==== National League Central ====
NL Central
Team	W	L	Pct.	GB	Home	Road
St. Louis Cardinals	100	62	.617	—	55‍–‍26	45‍–‍36
Pittsburgh Pirates	98	64	.605	2	53‍–‍28	45‍–‍36
Chicago Cubs	97	65	.599	3	49‍–‍32	48‍–‍33
Milwaukee Brewers	68	94	.420	32	34‍–‍47	34‍–‍47
Cincinnati Reds	64	98	.395	36	34‍–‍47	30‍–‍51

==== National League Wild Card ====
Division leaders
Team	W	L	Pct.
St. Louis Cardinals	100	62	.617
Los Angeles Dodgers	92	70	.568
New York Mets	90	72	.556

Wild Card teams (Top 2 teams qualify for postseason)
Team	W	L	Pct.	GB
Pittsburgh Pirates	98	64	.605	+1
Chicago Cubs	97	65	.599	—
San Francisco Giants	84	78	.519	13
Washington Nationals	83	79	.512	14
Arizona Diamondbacks	79	83	.488	18
San Diego Padres	74	88	.457	23
Miami Marlins	71	91	.438	26
Milwaukee Brewers	68	94	.420	29
Colorado Rockies	68	94	.420	29
Atlanta Braves	67	95	.414	30
Cincinnati Reds	64	98	.395	33
Philadelphia Phillies	63	99	.389	34

==== Record vs. opponents ====
2015 National League record Source: MLB Standings Grid – 2015
Team	AZ	ATL	CHC	CIN	COL	LAD	MIA	MIL	NYM	PHI	PIT	SD	SF	STL	WSH	AL
Arizona	—	3–3	2–4	6–1	13–6	6–13	5–2	5–2	2–5	2–4	1–5	9–10	11–8	0–7	3–4	11–9
Atlanta	3–3	—	1–6	3–4	1–6	3–3	10–9	5–2	8–11	11–8	2–4	2–5	3–4	4–2	5–14	6–14
Chicago	4–2	6–1	—	13–6	4–2	3–4	3–3	14–5	7–0	2–5	11–8	3–3	5–2	8–11	4–3	10–10
Cincinnati	1–6	4–3	6–13	—	2–4	1–6	3–4	9–10	0–7	4–2	11–8	2–4	2–5	7–12	5–1	7–13
Colorado	6–13	6–1	2–4	4–2	—	8–11	2–5	5–1	0–7	5–2	1–6	7–12	11–8	3–4	3–3	5–15
Los Angeles	13–6	3–3	4–3	6–1	11–8	—	4–2	4–3	3–4	5–2	1–5	14–5	8–11	2–5	4–2	10–10
Miami	2–5	9–10	3–3	4–3	5–2	2–4	—	4–2	8–11	9–10	1–6	2–5	5–2	1–5	9–10	7–13
Milwaukee	2–5	2–5	5–14	10–9	1–5	3–4	2–4	—	3–3	7–0	10–9	5–2	1–5	6–13	3–4	8–12
New York	5–2	11–8	0–7	7–0	7–0	4–3	11–8	3–3	—	14–5	0–6	2–4	3–3	3–4	11–8	9–11
Philadelphia	4–2	8–11	5–2	2–4	2–5	2–5	10–9	0–7	5–14	—	2–5	5–1	1–5	2–5	7–12	8–12
Pittsburgh	5–1	4–2	8–11	8–11	6–1	5–1	6–1	9–10	6–0	5–2	—	5–2	6–1	9–10	3–4	13–7
San Diego	10–9	5–2	3–3	4–2	12–7	5–14	5–2	2–5	4–2	1–5	2–5	—	8–11	4–3	2–5	7–13
San Francisco	8–11	4–3	2–5	5–2	8–11	11–8	2–5	5–1	3–3	5–1	1–6	11–8	—	2–4	4–3	13–7
St. Louis	7–0	2–4	11–8	12–7	4–3	5–2	5–1	13–6	4–3	5–2	10–9	3–4	4–2	—	4–2	11–9
Washington	4–3	14–5	3–4	1–5	3–3	2–4	10–9	4–3	8–11	12–7	4–3	5–2	3–4	2–4	—	8–12

=== Game log ===
2015 game log
April: 5–17 (Home: 3–10; Away: 2–7)

#	Date	Opponent	Score	Win	Loss	Save	Attendance	Record
1	April 6	Rockies	0–10	Kendrick (1–0)	**Lohse** (0–1)	—	46,032	0–1
2	April 7	Rockies	2–5	Lyles (1–0)	**Garza** (0–1)	Hawkins (1)	30,222	0–2
3	April 8	Rockies	4–5 (10)	Hawkins (1–0)	**Rodríguez** (0–1)	Axford (1)	28,720	0–3
4	April 10	Pirates	2–6	Locke (1–0)	**Fiers** (0–1)	—	27,373	0–4
5	April 11	Pirates	6–0	**Nelson** (1–0)	Worley (0–1)	—	41,108	1–4
6	April 12	Pirates	2–10	Sadler (1–0)	**Lohse** (0–2)	—	39,017	1–5
7	April 13	@ Cardinals	5–4	**Garza** (1–1)	Wainwright (1–1)	**Rodríguez** (1)	47,875	2–5
8	April 15	@ Cardinals	2–4	Lynn (1–1)	**Peralta** (0–1)	Rosenthal (3)	40,826	2–6
9	April 16	@ Cardinals	0–4	Lackey (1–0)	**Fiers** (0–2)	—	40,079	2–7
10	April 17	@ Pirates	3–6	Worley (1–1)	**Nelson** (1–1)	Melancon (1)	25,664	2–8
11	April 18	@ Pirates	2–6	Locke (2–0)	**Lohse** (0–3)	—	33,961	2–9
12	April 19	@ Pirates	2–5	Cole (2–0)	**Garza** (1–2)	Melancon (2)	28,129	2–10
13	April 20	Reds	1–6	DeSclafani (2–0)	**Peralta** (0–2)	—	26,660	2–11
14	April 21	Reds	10–16	Marquis (1–1)	**Fiers** (0–3)	—	27,293	2–12
15	April 22	Reds	1–2	Cueto (1–2)	**Rodríguez** (0–2)	Chapman (4)	30,452	2–13
16	April 23	Reds	4–2	**Lohse** (1–3)	Gregg (0–2)	**Rodríguez** (2)	27,795	3–13
17	April 24	Cardinals	0–3	Martínez (2–0)	**Garza** (1–3)	Rosenthal (7)	26,286	3–14
18	April 25	Cardinals	3–5	Belisle (1–0)	**Peralta** (0–3)	Maness (1)	35,919	3–15
19	April 26	Cardinals	6–3	**Blazek** (1–0)	Lynn (1–2)	**Rodríguez** (3)	32,758	4–15
20	April 27	@ Reds	6–9	Marquis (2–1)	**Nelson** (1–2)	—	17,167	4–16
21	April 28	@ Reds	2–4	Cueto (2–2)	**Lohse** (1–4)	Chapman (5)	19,238	4–17
22	April 29	@ Reds	8–3	**Garza** (2–3)	Lorenzen (0–1)	—	23,012	5–17

May: 12–17 (Home: 6–10; Away: 6–7)

#	Date	Opponent	Score	Win	Loss	Save	Attendance	Record
23	May 1	@ Cubs	0–1	Lester (1–2)	**Peralta** (0–4)	Rondón (5)	31,128	5–18
24	May 2	@ Cubs	6–1	**Fiers** (1–3)	Arrieta (3–2)	—	34,878	6–18
25	May 3	@ Cubs	5–3	**Smith** (1–0)	Strop (0–1)	**Rodríguez** (4)	33,398	7–18
26	May 4	Dodgers	4–3	**Blazek** (2–0)	Hatcher (0–3)	**Rodríguez** (5)	23,374	8–18
27	May 5	Dodgers	2–8	Greinke (5–0)	**Garza** (2–4)	—	23,356	8–19
28	May 6	Dodgers	6–3	**Peralta** (1–4)	Wieland (0–1)	**Rodríguez** (6)	22,708	9–19
29	May 7	Dodgers	4–14	Frías (3–0)	**Fiers** (1–4)	—	28,505	9–20
30	May 8	Cubs	6–7	Hammel (3–1)	**Nelson** (1–3)	—	38,283	9–21
31	May 9	Cubs	12–4	**Lohse** (2–4)	Wood (2–2)	—	39,600	10–21
32	May 10	Cubs	3–2 (11)	**Blazek** (3–0)	Motte (1–1)	—	41,467	11–21
33	May 11	White Sox	10–7	**Broxton** (1–0)	Duke (1–2)	**Rodríguez** (7)	29,886	12–21
34	May 12	White Sox	2–4	Sale (3–1)	**Blazek** (3–1)	Robertson (6)	26,935	12–22
35	May 13	White Sox	2–4	Quintana (2–3)	**Nelson** (1–4)	Robertson (7)	29,679	12–23
36	May 15	@ Mets	7–0	**Lohse** (3–4)	Colón (6–2)	—	27,554	13–23
37	May 16	@ Mets	1–14	deGrom (4–4)	**Garza** (2–5)	—	30,208	13–24
38	May 17	@ Mets	1–5	Syndergaard (1–1)	**Peralta** (1–5)	—	32,422	13–25
39	May 18	@ Tigers	3–2	**Jeffress** (1–0)	Lobstein (3–4)	**Rodríguez** (8)	26,016	14–25
40	May 19	@ Tigers	8–1	**Nelson** (2–4)	Sánchez (3–5)	—	26,994	15–25
41	May 20	@ Tigers	2–5	Hardy (2–0)	**Broxton** (1–1)	Soria (13)	27,716	15–26
42	May 21	@ Braves	1–10	Teherán (4–1)	**Garza** (2–6)	—	18,239	15–27
43	May 22	@ Braves	11–0	**Blazek** (4–1)	Stults (1–5)	—	25,774	16–27
44	May 23	@ Braves	2–3 (11)	Avilán (2–0)	**Kintzler** (0–1)	—	33,223	16–28
45	May 24	@ Braves	1–2	Foltynewicz (3–1)	**Nelson** (2–5)	Grilli (13)	30,612	16–29
46	May 25	Giants	4–8	Lincecum (5–2)	**Lohse** (3–5)	—	41,969	16–30
47	May 26	Giants	3–6	Bumgarner (6–2)	**Garza** (2–7)	Casilla (13)	35,492	16–31
48	May 27	Giants	1–3	Vogelsong (4–2)	**Fiers** (1–5)	Casilla (14)	35,208	16–32
49	May 29	D-backs	5–7	Reed (2–2)	**Broxton** (1–2)	Ziegler (3)	34,276	16–33
50	May 30	D-backs	3–7	Hellickson (3–3)	**Lohse** (3–6)	Delgado (1)	39,552	16–34
51	May 31	D-backs	7–6 (17)	**Garza** (3–7)	Nuño (0–1)	—	32,460	17–34

June: 14–14 (Home: 6–6; Away: 8–8)

#	Date	Opponent	Score	Win	Loss	Save	Attendance	Record
52	June 1	@ Cardinals	1–0	**Fiers** (2–5)	García (1–2)	**Rodríguez** (9)	40,689	18–34
53	June 2	@ Cardinals	0–1	Lynn (4–4)	**Cravy** (0–1)	Rosenthal (16)	42,835	18–35
54	June 3	@ Cardinals	4–7	Lackey (4–3)	**Nelson** (2–6)	Rosenthal (17)	41,567	18–36
55	June 5	@ Twins	10–5	**Jeffress** (2–0)	Boyer (1–2)	—	29,398	19–36
56	June 6	@ Twins	4–2	**Garza** (4–7)	Pressly (3–2)	**Rodríguez** (10)	38,707	20–36
57	June 7	@ Twins	0–2	Pelfrey (5–2)	**Fiers** (2–6)	Perkins (21)	31,911	20–37
58	June 8	@ Pirates	2–0	**Nelson** (3–6)	Burnett (6–2)	**Rodríguez** (11)	18,016	21–37
59	June 9	@ Pirates	4–1	**Jungmann** (1–0)	Liriano (3–5)	**Rodríguez** (12)	20,672	22–37
60	June 10	@ Pirates	0–2	Morton (4–0)	**Lohse** (3–7)	Melancon (19)	26,269	22–38
61	June 11	Nationals	6–5	**Smith** (2–0)	Barrett (3–2)	**Rodríguez** (13)	26,371	23–38
62	June 12	Nationals	8–4	**Fiers** (3–6)	Zimmermann (5–4)	—	31,815	24–38
63	June 13	Nationals	2–7	Ross (1–1)	**Nelson** (3–7)	—	36,800	24–39
64	June 14	Nationals	0–4	Scherzer (7–5)	**Jungmann** (1–1)	—	34,964	24–40
65	June 15	Royals	5–8	Vólquez (6–4)	**Lohse** (3–8)	Davis (8)	23,007	24–41
66	June 16	Royals	2–7	Young (6–2)	**Garza** (4–8)	—	27,740	24–42
67	June 17	@ Royals	2–10	Blanton (1–0)	**Fiers** (3–7)	—	33,420	24–43
68	June 18	@ Royals	2–3	Guthrie (5–4)	**Nelson** (3–8)	Holland (12)	36,318	24–44
69	June 19	@ Rockies	9–5	**Jungmann** (2–1)	de la Rosa (4–3)	—	35,841	25–44
70	June 20	@ Rockies	1–5	Bettis (3–2)	**Lohse** (3–9)	—	35,180	25–45
71	June 21	@ Rockies	4–10	Rusin (3–2)	**Garza** (4–9)	—	41,487	25–46
72	June 23	Mets	3–2	**Smith** (3–0)	Robles (1–2)	**Rodríguez** (14)	25,055	26–46
73	June 24	Mets	4–1	**Nelson** (4–8)	Colón (9–6)	**Rodríguez** (15)	22,017	27–46
74	June 25	Mets	0–2	deGrom (8–5)	**Blazek** (4–2)	Familia (20)	33,354	27–47
75	June 26	Twins	10–4	**Lohse** (4–9)	May (4–6)	—	33,296	28–47
76	June 27	Twins	2–5	Gibson (5–6)	**Garza** (4–10)	Perkins (24)	39,977	28–48
77	June 28	Twins	5–3	**Smith** (4–0)	Fien (2–3)	—	38,958	29–48
78	June 29	@ Phillies	7–4	**Nelson** (5–8)	O'Sullivan (1–6)	**Rodríguez** (16)	18,423	30–48
79	June 30	@ Phillies	4–3	**Cotts** (1–0)	Giles (3–2)	**Rodríguez** (17)	20,564	31–48

July: 13–12 (Home: 5–5; Away: 8–7)

#	Date	Opponent	Score	Win	Loss	Save	Attendance	Record
80	July 1	@ Phillies	9–5	**Lohse** (5–9)	Harang (4–11)	—	27,069	32–48
81	July 2	@ Phillies	8–7 (11)	**Blazek** (5–2)	García (2–3)	**Rodríguez** (18)	30,486	33–48
82	July 3	@ Reds	12–1	**Fiers** (4–7)	Lorenzen (3–3)	—	40,760	34–48
83	July 4	@ Reds	7–3	**Nelson** (6–8)	Smith (0–2)	—	38,663	35–48
84	July 5	@ Reds	6–1	**Jungmann** (3–1)	Leake (5–5)	—	28,881	36–48
85	July 6	Braves	3–5	Wisler (3–1)	**Lohse** (5–10)	Grilli (23)	25,046	36–49
86	July 7	Braves	3–4	Banuelos (1–0)	**Cravy** (0–2)	Grilli (24)	33,388	36–50
87	July 8	Braves	6–5	**Jeffress** (3–0)	Avilán (2–3)	**Rodríguez** (19)	33,338	37–50
88	July 10	@ Dodgers	2–3	Tsao (1–0)	**Nelson** (6–9)	Jansen (15)	44,200	37–51
89	July 11	@ Dodgers	7–1	**Jungmann** (4–1)	Beachy (0–1)	—	49,081	38–51
90	July 12	@ Dodgers	3–4	Báez (2–1)	**Smith** (4–1)	Jansen (16)	43,229	38–52
–	July 14	86th All-Star Game	National League vs. American League (Great American Ball Park, Cincinnati)					
91	July 17	Pirates	4–1	**Fiers** (5–7)	Morton (6–3)	**Rodríguez** (20)	32,363	39–52
92	July 18	Pirates	8–5	**Nelson** (7–9)	Worley (3–5)	**Rodríguez** (21)	33,104	40–52
93	July 19	Pirates	6–1	**Jungmann** (5–1)	Locke (5–6)	—	33,835	41–52
94	July 21	Indians	8–1	**Garza** (5–10)	Salazar (8–5)	—	34,379	42–52
95	July 22	Indians	5–7	Adams (1–0)	**Lohse** (5–11)	Allen (20)	32,588	42–53
96	July 23	@ D-backs	3–8	Godley (1–0)	**Fiers** (5–8)	—	18,011	42–54
97	July 24	@ D-backs	2–1	**Nelson** (8–9)	Corbin (1–3)	**Rodríguez** (22)	29,956	43–54
98	July 25	@ D-backs	0–2	De La Rosa (8–5)	**Jungmann** (5–2)	Ziegler (16)	34,957	43–55
99	July 26	@ D-backs	0–3	Hellickson (7–6)	**Garza** (5–11)	Ziegler (17)	24,216	43–56
100	July 27	@ Giants	2–4	Heston (11–5)	**Lohse** (5–12)	Romo (2)	41,988	43–57
101	July 28	@ Giants	5–2	**Peralta** (2–5)	Cain (2–2)	**Rodríguez** (23)	42,743	44–57
102	July 29	@ Giants	0–5	Strickland (1–1)	**Fiers** (5–9)	—	42,352	44–58
103	July 30	Cubs	2–5	Soriano (2–0)	**Smith** (4–2)	Rondón (14)	36,206	44–59
104	July 31	Cubs	1–4	Hammel (6–5)	**Jungmann** (5–3)	Rondón (15)	35,669	44–60

August: 11–15 (Home: 10–8; Away: 1–7)

#	Date	Opponent	Score	Win	Loss	Save	Attendance	Record
105	August 1	Cubs	2–4	Hendricks (5–5)	**Garza** (5–12)	Hunter (1)	41,720	44–61
106	August 2	Cubs	3–4	Richard (2–0)	**Lohse** (5–13)	Rondón (16)	38,536	44–62
107	August 3	Padres	5–13	Ross (8–8)	**Peralta** (2–6)	—	20,888	44–63
108	August 4	Padres	4–1	**Nelson** (9–9)	Cashner (4–11)	**Rodríguez** (24)	23,616	45–63
109	August 5	Padres	8–5	**Jungmann** (6–3)	Kennedy (6–10)	**Rodríguez** (25)	22,975	46–63
110	August 6	Padres	10–1	**Garza** (6–12)	Despaigne (5–8)	—	28,789	47–63
111	August 7	Cardinals	0–6	Lynn (9–6)	**Cravy** (0–3)	Villanueva (2)	28,869	47–64
112	August 8	Cardinals	0–3	García (4–4)	**Peralta** (2–7)	Rosenthal (33)	34,327	47–65
113	August 9	Cardinals	5–4	**Smith** (5–2)	Broxton (1–3)	**Rodríguez** (26)	34,993	48–65
114	August 11	@ Cubs	3–6	Haren (8–7)	**Jungmann** (6–4)	Russell (1)	37,109	48–66
115	August 12	@ Cubs	2–3 (10)	Hunter (3–2)	**Blazek** (5–3)	—	36,438	48–67
116	August 13	@ Cubs	2–9	Lester (8–8)	**Cravy** (0–4)	—	40,799	48–68
117	August 14	Phillies	3–1	**Peralta** (3–7)	Morgan (3–4)	**Rodríguez** (27)	34,735	49–68
118	August 15	Phillies	4–2	**Smith** (6–2)	De Fratus (0–2)	**Rodríguez** (28)	39,204	50–68
119	August 16	Phillies	6–1	**Jungmann** (7–4)	Harang (5–14)	**Rodríguez** (29)	33,920	51–68
120	August 17	Marlins	2–6	Nicolino (2–1)	**Garza** (6–13)	—	21,910	51–69
121	August 18	Marlins	6–9	Flores (1–1)	**Cravy** (0–5)	Ramos (20)	31,937	51–70
122	August 19	Marlins	8–7	**Peralta** (4–7)	Koehler (8–11)	**Rodríguez** (30)	30,453	52–70
123	August 21	@ Nationals	10–3	**Nelson** (10–9)	González (9–6)	**Lohse** (1)	29,916	53–70
124	August 22	@ Nationals	1–6	Ross (4–5)	**Jungmann** (7–5)	—	33,171	53–71
125	August 23	@ Nationals	5–9	Zimmermann (10–8)	**Garza** (6–14)	—	28,039	53–72
126	August 25	@ Indians	6–11	Tomlin (2–1)	**Peralta** (4–8)	—	11,687	53–73
127	August 26	@ Indians	2–6	Manship (1–0)	**Nelson** (10–10)	—	13,052	53–74
128	August 28	Reds	5–0	**Jungmann** (8–5)	Iglesias (3–6)	—	27,632	54–74
129	August 29	Reds	9–12	Hoover (6–0)	**Rodríguez** (0–3)	Chapman (25)	34,365	54–75
130	August 30	Reds	4–1	**Peralta** (5–8)	Lamb (0–3)	**Rodríguez** (31)	33,293	55–75

September: 13–15 (Home: 4–5; Away: 9–10)

#	Date	Opponent	Score	Win	Loss	Save	Attendance	Record
131	September 1	Pirates	7–4	**Nelson** (11–10)	Cole (15–8)	**Rodríguez** (32)	18,468	56–75
132	September 2	Pirates	9–4	**Jeffress** (4–0)	Locke (7–9)	—	24,521	57–75
133	September 3	Pirates	5–3	**Jungmann** (9–5)	Liriano (9–7)	**Rodríguez** (33)	22,424	58–75
–	September 4	@ Reds	6:10pm	PPD, RAIN; rescheduled for September 5				
134	September 5	@ Reds	8–6	**Jeffress** (5–0)	Hoover (7–1)	**Rodríguez** (34)	28,632	59–75
135	September 5	@ Reds	7–3	**Peña** (1–0)	Sampson (2–3)	—	29,842	60–75
136	September 6	@ Reds	3–6	Lorenzen (4–8)	**Nelson** (11–11)	Chapman (28)	28,027	60–76
137	September 7	@ Marlins	9–1	**Davies** (1–0)	Nicolino (3–3)	—	16,804	61–76
138	September 8	@ Marlins	4–6	Barraclough (2–0)	**Jungmann** (9–6)	Ramos (24)	14,958	61–77
139	September 9	@ Marlins	2–5	Koehler (9–13)	**Cravy** (0–6)	Ramos (25)	15,316	61–78
140	September 10	@ Pirates	6–4 (13)	**Rodríguez** (1–3)	Liz (1–4)	**Lohse** (2)	21,964	62–78
141	September 11	@ Pirates	3–6	Morton (9–7)	**Nelson** (11–12)	Melancon (45)	28,346	62–79
142	September 12	@ Pirates	2–10	Locke (8–10)	**Davies** (1–1)	—	35,749	62–80
143	September 13	@ Pirates	6–7 (11)	Hughes (3–1)	**Thornburg** (0–1)	—	34,740	62–81
144	September 15	Cardinals	1–3 (10)	Siegrist (7–1)	**Thornburg** (0–2)	Rosenthal (44)	30,349	62–82
145	September 16	Cardinals	4–5	García (9–5)	**Peralta** (5–9)	Rosenthal (45)	19,827	62–83
146	September 17	Cardinals	3–6	Lackey (12–9)	**Nelson** (11–13)	—	23,734	62–84
147	September 18	Reds	3–5	Finnegan (4–0)	**Davies** (1–2)	Chapman (31)	37,158	62–85
148	September 19	Reds	7–9	Badenhop (2–4)	**Cravy** (0–7)	Chapman (32)	30,387	62–86
149	September 20	Reds	8–4	**Peña** (2–0)	DeSclafani (9–11)	—	29,479	63–86
150	September 21	@ Cubs	5–9	Hammel (9–6)	**Peralta** (5–10)	—	34,373	63–87
151	September 22	@ Cubs	0–4	Arrieta (20–6)	**Cravy** (0–8)	—	36,270	63–88
152	September 23	@ Cubs	4–1	**Davies** (2–2)	Hendricks (7–7)	**Rodríguez** (35)	37,559	64–88
153	September 24	@ Cardinals	3–7	Wacha (17–6)	**Jungmann** (9–7)	—	43,243	64–89
154	September 25	@ Cardinals	4–3	**Smith** (7–2)	Rosenthal (2–3)	**Rodríguez** (36)	45,057	65–89
155	September 26	@ Cardinals	1–5	García (10–5)	**Wagner** (0–1)	—	45,561	65–90
156	September 27	@ Cardinals	8–4	**Goforth** (1–0)	Rosenthal (2–4)	**Rodríguez** (37)	45,021	66–90
157	September 29	@ Padres	4–3	**López** (1–0)	Ross (10–12)	**Rodríguez** (38)	36,047	67–90
158	September 30	@ Padres	5–0	**Davies** (3–2)	Cashner (6–16)	—	30,514	68–90

October: 0–4 (Home: 0–3; Away: 0–1)

#	Date	Opponent	Score	Win	Loss	Save	Attendance	Record
159	October 1	@ Padres	1–3	Kennedy (9–15)	**Jungmann** (9–8)	Kimbrel (39)	22,129	68–91
160	October 2	Cubs	1–6	Arrieta (22–6)	**Peña** (2–1)	—	30,044	68–92
161	October 3	Cubs	0–1	Hendricks (8–7)	**Wagner** (0–2)	Rondón (30)	35,291	68–93
162	October 4	Cubs	1–3	Haren (11–9)	**López** (1–1)	Wood (4)	32,959	68–94

- Brewers win
- Brewers loss
- Postponement
- Bold: Brewers team member

== Detailed records ==
National League
Opponent	Home	Away	Total	Pct.	Runs scored	Runs allowed
NL East
Atlanta Braves	1–2	1–3	2–5	.286	27	29
Miami Marlins	1–2	1–2	2–4	.333	31	34
New York Mets	2–1	1–2	3–3	.500	16	24
Philadelphia Phillies	3–0	4–0	7–0	1.000	41	23
Washington Nationals	2–2	1–2	3–4	.429	32	38
	9–7	8–9	17–16	.515	147	148
NL Central
Milwaukee Brewers	—	—	—	—	—	—
Chicago Cubs	2–8	3–6	5–14	.263	58	77
Cincinnati Reds	4–6	6–3	10–9	.526	111	93
Pittsburgh Pirates	7–2	3–7	10–9	.526	79	81
St. Louis Cardinals	2–7	4–6	6–13	.316	50	77
	15–23	16–22	31–45	.408	298	328
NL West
Arizona Diamondbacks	1–2	1–3	2–5	.286	20	34
Colorado Rockies	0–3	1–2	1–5	.167	20	40
Los Angeles Dodgers	2–2	1–2	3–4	.429	28	36
San Diego Padres	3–1	2–1	5–2	.714	37	26
San Francisco Giants	0–3	1–2	1–5	.167	15	28
	6–11	6–10	12–21	.364	120	164

American League
Opponent	Home	Away	Total	Pct.	Runs scored	Runs allowed
Chicago White Sox	1–2	—	1–2	.333	14	15
Cleveland Indians	1–1	0–2	1–3	.250	21	25
Detroit Tigers	—	2–1	2–1	.667	13	8
Kansas City Royals	0–2	0–2	0–4	.000	11	28
Minnesota Twins	2–1	2–1	4–2	.667	31	21
	4–6	4–6	8–12	.400	90	97

== Roster ==
2015 Milwaukee Brewers
Roster
Pitchers: 50 Yhonathan Barrios; 54 Michael Blazek; 51 Jonathan Broxton; 48 Neal Cotts; 45 Tyler Cravy; 27 Zach Davies; 50 Mike Fiers; 22 Matt Garza; 32 David Goforth; 58 Preston Guilmet; 47 Adrian Houser; 21 Jeremy Jeffress; 51 César Jiménez; 41 Taylor Jungmann; 53 Brandon Kintzler; 46 Corey Knebel; 26 Kyle Lohse; 28 Jorge López; 52 Jimmy Nelson; 58 Ariel Peña; 38 Wily Peralta; 57 Francisco Rodríguez; 13 Will Smith; 30,37 Tyler Thornburg; 59 Tyler Wagner; 47 Rob Wooten	Catchers: 5 Nevin Ashley; 25 Juan Centeno; 20 Jonathan Lucroy; 12 Martín Maldonado; Infielders: 2 Scooter Gennett; 5 Héctor Gómez; 3 Elián Herrera; 14 Luis Jiménez; 24 Adam Lind; 14 Hernán Pérez; 16 Aramis Ramírez; 29 Yadiel Rivera; 15 Jason Rogers; 10 Luis Sardiñas; 9 Jean Segura	Outfielders: 8 Ryan Braun; 18 Khris Davis; 27 Carlos Gómez; 28 Gerardo Parra; 35 Shane Peterson; 25 Michael Reed; 16 Domingo Santana; 7 Logan Schafer	Manager: 30 Craig Counsell; 10 Ron Roenicke; Coaches: 11 Darnell Coles (hitting); 56 Joe Crawford (coach); 33 Mike Guerrero (first base); 55 Marcus Hanel (bullpen catcher); 39 Rick Kranitz (pitching); 36 Jerry Narron (bench); 6 Ed Sedar (third base); 43 Lee Tunnell (bullpen)

== Statistics ==
Through October 4, 2015

=== Batting ===
Note: G = Games played; AB = At bats; R = Runs scored; H = Hits; 2B = Doubles; 3B = Triples; HR = Home runs; RBI = Runs batted in; BB = Base on balls; SO = Strikeouts; AVG = Batting average; SB = Stolen bases

Player	G	AB	R	H	2B	3B	HR	RBI	BB	SO	AVG	SB
Nevin Ashley, C	12	20	2	2	1	0	0	1	0	8	.100	0
Michael Blazek, P	45	4	0	1	1	0	0	1	0	2	.250	0
Ryan Braun, RF	140	506	87	144	27	3	25	84	54	115	.285	24
Juan Centeno, C	10	21	0	1	1	0	0	0	2	7	.048	0
Tyler Cravy, P	14	8	0	0	0	0	0	0	0	3	.000	0
Zach Davies, P	6	13	1	1	0	0	0	0	0	3	.077	0
Khris Davis, LF	121	392	54	97	16	2	27	66	44	122	.247	6
Mike Fiers, P	21	30	0	3	0	0	0	0	0	12	.100	0
Matt Garza, P	26	39	0	3	0	0	0	0	1	21	.077	0
Scooter Gennett, 2B	114	375	42	99	18	4	6	29	12	68	.264	1
David Goforth, P	20	3	0	0	0	0	0	0	0	3	.000	0
Carlos Gómez, CF	74	286	42	75	20	1	8	43	23	70	.262	7
Héctor Gómez, 2B	66	127	15	23	11	2	1	7	3	40	.181	0
Elián Herrera, 2B, 3B	83	256	29	62	18	0	7	33	18	72	.242	3
Luis Jiménez, 3B	15	15	1	1	0	0	0	0	1	6	.067	0
Taylor Jungmann, P	21	37	2	10	2	0	0	0	1	12	.270	0
Brandon Kintzler, P	7	1	0	0	0	0	0	0	0	0	.000	0
Adam Lind, 1B	149	502	72	139	32	0	20	87	66	100	.277	0
Kyle Lohse, P	41	39	3	9	1	0	0	1	0	10	.231	0
Jorge López, P	2	2	0	0	0	0	0	0	0	2	.000	0
Jonathan Lucroy, C	103	371	51	98	20	3	7	43	36	64	.264	1
Martín Maldonado, C	79	229	19	48	7	0	4	22	23	65	.210	0
Jimmy Nelson, P	30	55	1	6	1	0	0	2	1	34	.109	0
Gerardo Parra, OF	100	323	53	106	24	5	9	31	20	57	.328	9
Ariel Peña, P	6	7	0	0	0	0	0	0	0	6	.000	0
Wily Peralta, P	20	30	1	1	0	0	0	1	3	15	.033	0
Hernán Pérez, 3B	90	230	13	62	15	2	1	21	4	48	.270	4
Shane Peterson, OF	93	201	22	52	7	3	2	16	20	55	.259	0
Aramis Ramírez, 3B	81	279	25	69	18	0	11	42	16	42	.247	1
Michael Reed, RF	7	6	2	2	1	0	0	0	0	3	.333	0
Yadiel Rivera, IF	7	14	0	1	0	0	0	0	0	4	.071	0
Jason Rogers, 1B	86	152	22	45	6	2	4	16	15	34	.296	0
Luis Sardiñas, SS, 2B	36	97	8	19	0	1	0	4	6	25	.196	0
Domingo Santana, OF	38	121	14	28	5	0	6	18	18	46	.231	2
Logan Schafer, CF	69	122	17	27	6	1	1	6	12	29	.221	0
Jean Segura, SS	142	560	57	144	16	5	6	50	13	93	.257	25
Tyler Thornburg, P	24	3	0	0	0	0	0	0	0	1	.000	0
Tyler Wagner, P	3	3	0	0	0	0	0	0	0	2	.000	0
Rob Wooten, P	4	1	0	0	0	0	0	0	0	0	.000	0
Team totals	162	5480	655	1378	274	34	145	624	412	1299	.251	84

=== Pitching ===
Note: W = Wins; L = Losses; ERA = Earned run average; G = Games pitched; GS = Games started; SV = Saves; IP = Innings pitched; H = Hits allowed; R = Runs allowed; ER = Earned runs allowed; HR = Home runs allowed; BB = Walks allowed; K = Strikeouts

Player	W	L	ERA	G	GS	SV	IP	H	R	ER	HR	BB	K
Yhonathan Barrios	0	0	0.00	5	0	0	6.2	3	0	0	0	0	7
Michael Blazek	5	3	2.43	45	0	0	55.2	40	17	15	3	18	47
Jonathan Broxton	1	2	5.89	40	0	0	36.2	41	24	24	5	10	37
Neal Cotts	1	0	3.26	51	0	0	49.2	44	18	18	9	17	49
Tyler Cravy	0	8	5.70	14	7	0	42.2	47	27	27	5	22	35
Zach Davies	3	2	3.71	6	6	0	34.0	26	14	14	2	15	24
Mike Fiers	5	9	3.89	21	21	0	118.0	117	57	51	14	43	121
Matt Garza	6	14	5.63	26	25	0	148.2	176	101	93	23	57	104
David Goforth	1	0	4.01	20	0	0	24.2	32	11	11	4	8	24
Preston Guilmet	0	0	27.00	2	0	0	2.0	4	6	6	1	2	1
Adrian Houser	0	0	0.00	2	0	0	2.0	1	0	0	0	2	0
Jeremy Jeffress	5	0	2.65	72	0	0	68.0	64	21	20	5	22	67
César Jiménez	0	0	3.66	16	0	0	19.2	16	8	8	2	8	21
Taylor Jungmann	9	8	3.77	21	21	0	119.1	106	54	50	11	47	107
Brandon Kintzler	0	1	6.43	7	0	0	7.0	12	6	5	1	5	7
Corey Knebel	0	0	3.22	48	0	0	50.1	44	18	18	8	17	58
Kyle Lohse	5	13	5.85	37	22	2	152.1	180	99	99	29	43	108
Jorge López	1	1	5.40	2	2	0	10.0	14	6	6	0	5	10
Jimmy Nelson	11	13	4.11	30	30	0	177.1	163	89	81	18	65	148
Ariel Peña	2	1	4.28	6	5	0	27.1	24	14	13	2	14	27
Wily Peralta	5	10	4.72	20	20	0	108.2	130	58	57	14	37	60
Francisco Rodríguez	1	3	2.21	60	0	38	57.0	38	14	14	6	11	62
Will Smith	7	2	2.70	76	0	0	63.1	52	22	19	5	24	91
Tyler Thornburg	0	2	3.67	24	0	0	34.1	31	21	14	7	12	34
Tyler Wagner	0	2	7.24	3	3	0	13.2	22	11	11	1	7	5
Rob Wooten	0	0	12.00	4	0	0	6.0	5	8	8	1	6	6
Team totals	68	94	4.28	162	162	40	1435.0	1432	737	682	176	517	1260

== Farm system ==
The Brewers' farm system consisted of seven minor league affiliates in 2015.

Level	Team	League	Manager
Triple-A	Colorado Springs Sky Sox	Pacific Coast League	Rick Sweet
Double-A	Biloxi Shuckers	Southern League	Carlos Subero
Class A-Advanced	Brevard County Manatees	Florida State League	Joe Ayrault
Class A	Wisconsin Timber Rattlers	Midwest League	Matt Erickson
Rookie	Helena Brewers	Pioneer League	Tony Diggs
Rookie	AZL Brewers	Arizona League	Néstor Corredor
Rookie	DSL Brewers	Dominican Summer League	—
