= Josh Prince =

American baseball player (born 1988)

- Utility player
- Born: January 26, 1988 (age 38); Sulphur, Louisiana, U.S.
- Batted: Right Threw: Right

MLB debut
- April 6, 2013, for the Milwaukee Brewers

Last MLB appearance
- June 20, 2013, for the Milwaukee Brewers

MLB statistics
- Batting average: .125
- Home runs: 0
- Runs batted in: 0
- Stats at Baseball Reference

Teams
- Milwaukee Brewers (2013)

Joshua Cole Prince (born January 26, 1988) is an American former professional baseball utility player who is currently a minor league hitting coach. He played in Major League Baseball (MLB) for the Milwaukee Brewers in 2013.

== Playing career ==
=== Amateur baseball ===
Prince attended Alfred M. Barbe High School in Lake Charles, Louisiana. He was twice named to the All-Louisiana team, and graduated in 2006. He enrolled at the University of Texas at Austin, where he played college baseball for the Texas Longhorns baseball team as a freshman. He was named a Freshman All-American. After his freshman year, Prince transferred to Tulane University, and he continued his college baseball career with the Tulane Green Wave baseball team. He also played summer collegiate baseball for the Green Bay Bullfrogs of the Northwoods League in 2008.

=== Milwaukee Brewers ===
The Milwaukee Brewers selected Prince in the third round, with the 105th overall selection, of the 2009 Major League Baseball draft. Prince started his professional career with the Helena Brewers of the Rookie-level Pioneer League in 2009; he was moved up to the Wisconsin Timber Rattlers of the Single–A Midwest League during the season. Prince was promoted to the Brevard County Manatees of the High–A Florida State League in 2010 and 2011. He was moved to centerfield while at Brevard County. He played the 2012 season with the Huntsville Stars of the Double–A Southern League. After the 2012 regular season, the Brewers assigned Prince to the Phoenix Desert Dogs of the Arizona Fall League (AFL). Prince led the AFL in hits.

The Brewers added him to their 40-man roster after the 2012 season. Prince began the 2013 season with the Nashville Sounds of the Triple–A Pacific Coast League. He was called up to the major leagues on April 6, 2013, to replace the injured Aramis Ramírez. He was outrighted off the roster on October 4, 2013.

Prince spent the 2014 season with Huntsville, and became a free agent after the season.

=== Detroit Tigers ===
On March 22, 2015, the Detroit Tigers signed Prince to a minor league contract. In 40 games for the Double–A Erie SeaWolves, he hit .205/.296/.299 with two home runs, nine RBI, and eight stolen bases. Prince was released by the Tigers organization on June 20.

=== Bridgeport Bluefish ===
After being released by the Tigers, Prince signed with the Bridgeport Bluefish of the Atlantic League of Professional Baseball for the remainder of the 2015 season.

=== Sugar Land Skeeters ===
On April 6, 2016, Prince signed with the Sugar Land Skeeters of the Atlantic League. Prince later re–signed with the Skeeters for the 2017 season.

=== Arizona Diamondbacks ===
On January 5, 2018, Prince signed a minor league contract with the Arizona Diamondbacks. He spent the season with the Double–A Jackson Generals, also playing in two games for the Triple–A Reno Aces. In 102 games for Jackson, Prince hit .285/.385/.411 with six home runs, 37 RBI, and 12 stolen bases. He elected free agency following the season on November 2.

=== Sugar Land Skeeters (second stint) ===
On January 18, 2019, Prince re-signed with the Sugar Land Skeeters as a player-coach. After hitting .133 in 13 games, he was released on May 10.

=== Texas AirHogs ===
On May 17, 2019, Prince signed as a player-coach with the Texas AirHogs of the American Association.

=== Arizona Diamondbacks (second stint) ===
On July 7, 2019, Prince's contract was purchased by the Arizona Diamondbacks organization. In 26 games for the Triple–A Reno Aces, he batted .300/.364/.500 with two home runs, 10 RBI, and two stolen bases. Prince elected free agency following the season on November 4.

== Post-playing career ==
In January 2020, Prince was named hitting coach of the Greenville Drive, the Single–A affiliate of the Boston Red Sox.

He was named as the hitting coach of the FCL Red Sox for the 2022 season.

== Personal life ==
Prince's older brothers, Ran and Dooley, both played college baseball.
