= Helena Brewers =

- 1978–2018; Helena, Montana

Minor league affiliations
- Class: Rookie (1978–2000, 2003–2018)
- League: Pioneer League (1978–2000, 2003–2018)

Major league affiliations
- Team: Milwaukee Brewers (1985–2000, 2003–2018); Independent (1984); Philadelphia Phillies (1978–1983)

Minor league titles
- League titles (4): 1984; 1995; 1996; 2010
- Division titles (10): 1979; 1984; 1987; 1993; 1994; 1995; 1996; 2005; 2010; 2013

Team data
- Previous names: Helena Brewers (1987–2000, 2003–2018); Helena Gold Sox (1984–1986); Helena Phillies (1978–1983)
- Colors: Blue, gold, white, wheat, ivory
- Mascot: Wally the Mammoth (2015–2018); Lewis the Lion and Clark the Cougar (2003–2015); Brewinkle (1996-2000)
- Ballpark: Kindrick Legion Field (1978–2000, 2003–2018)

The Helena Brewers were a Minor League Baseball team in the Pioneer League located in Helena, Montana, from 1978 to 2018. The team played their home games at Kindrick Legion Field, which was built in 1939. They were affiliated with the Milwaukee Brewers (1985–2000, 2003–2018) and Philadelphia Phillies (1978–1983).

Among the best-known players to play in Helena are Hall of Famer Ryne Sandberg, who started his career with the Phillies in Helena, Gary Sheffield, who started his career with the Helena Gold Sox in 1986, Jeff Cirillo and Mark Loretta who began their careers with the 1991 and 1993 Helena Brewers, respectively; and Milwaukee Brewers outfielder Ryan Braun.

== History ==
The Helena Phillies joined the Pioneer League in 1978, giving Helena a professional baseball team for the first time in 64 years. In 1984, the Helena Gold Sox won the Pioneer League Championship, a rarity for an independent club. The team hooked on with the Milwaukee Brewers in 1985 and changed its name to the Helena Brewers in 1987. Helena won the league championship in back-to-back seasons in 1995 and 1996. The franchise moved to Provo, Utah, as the Provo Angels after the 2000 season. In 2003, the Medicine Hat Blue Jays moved to Helena, and the team once again became a Brewers affiliate, called the Helena Brewers.

In 2015, David Denson, while playing for the Helena Brewers, which were then affiliated with the Milwaukee Brewers, became the first active player in affiliated professional baseball to come out as gay.

The franchise left Helena for Colorado Springs, Colorado, after the 2018 season, where it would play as the Rocky Mountain Vibes.

== Season-by-season record ==
Helena Brewers
Year	Regular Season			Postseason		
Year	Record	Win %	Finish*	Record	Win %	Result
1978	30–38	.441	6th	—	—	—
1979	43–26	.623	2nd	0–2	.000	Lost PL Championship vs Lethbridge Dodgers, 0–2
1980	32–38	.457	3rd	—	—	—
1981	22–44	.371	4th	—	—	—
1982	29–41	.414	4th	—	—	—
1983	16–54	.229	4th	—	—	—
1984	44–24	.647	1st	3–1	.750	Won PL Championship vs Billings Mustangs, 3–1
1985	42–26	.618	2nd	—	—	—
1986	38–32	.543	3rd	—	—	—
1987	46–24	.657	1st	1–3	.250	Lost PL Championship vs Salt Lake City Trappers, 1–3
1988	41–29	.586	2nd	—	—	—
1989	38–30	.559	2nd	—	—	—
1990	37–28	.569	3rd	—	—	—
1991	44–26	.629	2nd	—	—	—
1992	50–26	.658	2nd	—	—	—
1993	43–30	.589	1st	1–2	.333	Lost PL Championship vs Billings Mustangs, 1–2
1994	44–28	.611	1st	2–3	.400	Lost PL Championship vs Billings Mustangs, 2–3
1995	49–22	.690	1st	4–1	.800	Won Northern Division Championship vs Idaho Falls Braves, 2–1; Won PL Championship vs Medicine Hat Blue Jays, 2–0
1996	43–29	.597	2nd	4–1	.800	Won Northern Division Championship vs Lethbridge Black Diamonds, 2–1; Won PL Championship vs Ogden Raptors, 2–0
1997	37–34	.521	5th	—	—	—
1998	21–55	.276	4th	—	—	—
1999	47–28	.627	1st	0–2	.000	Lost Northern Division Championship vs Missoula Osprey, 0–2
2000	26–50	.342	4th	—	—	—
2003	48–28	.632	2nd	1–2	.333	Lost Northern Division Championship vs Billings Mustangs, 1–2
2004	39–37	.513	2nd	—	—	—
2005	46–30	.605	1st	2–2	.500	Won Northern Division Championship vs Billings Mustangs, 2–0; Lost PL Championship vs Orem Owlz, 0–2
2006	34–42	.447	3rd	—	—	—
2007	48–28	.632	2nd	1–2	.333	Lost Northern Division Championship vs Great Falls White Sox, 1–2
2008	35–41	.461	6th	—	—	—
2009	32–44	.421	6th	—	—	—
2010	41–34	.421	3rd	4–1	.800	Won North Division Championship vs Great Falls Voyagers, 2–1; Won PL Championship vs Ogden Raptors, 2–0
2011	30–46	.395	7th	—	—	—
2012	24–52	.316	8th	—	—	—
2013	43–33	.566	2nd	3-2	.600	Won North Division Championship vs Great Falls Voyagers, 2–0; Lost PL Championship vs Idaho Falls Chukars, 1–2
2014	27–49	.355	8th	—	—	—
2015	32–42	.432	8th	–	–	—
2016	28–46	.378	8th	–	–	—
2017	28–48	.368	8th	–	–	—
2018	36–40	.474	6th	–	–	—
Totals	1,433–1,402	.505	–	29–26	.509	4 League Championships
Note: * Finish denotes overall position in the league standings.

== Major leaguers ==
The following is a list of Helena players by year that later played in Major League Baseball:

- 1978: George Bell, Carmelo Castillo, Wil Culmer, Bob Dernier, Ed Hearn, Alejandro Sánchez, Ryne Sandberg
- 1979: Jay Baller, Roy Smith
- 1980: Rocky Childress, Darren Daulton, Marty Decker, Ken Dowell, Tony Ghelfi
- 1981: Johnny Abrego, Charles Hudson, Jim Olander, Jose Segura
- 1982: Ken Jackson, Lance McCullers, Johnny Paredes, Wilfredo Tejada
- 1983: Ricky Jordan, Tom Magrann, Tom Newell
- 1984: Jack Daugherty, John Trautwein
- 1985: John Jaha, Russ McGinnis, Randy Veres
- 1986: George Canale, Brian Drahman, Darryl Hamilton, Gary Sheffield, Greg Vaughn
- 1987: Frank Bolick, Oreste Marrero, Ángel Miranda, Charlie Montoyo, Jaime Navarro, Dave Nilsson, Troy O'Leary, Steve Sparks, Bill Spiers
- 1988: Bert Heffernan, Mike Ignasiak, Mark Kiefer
- 1991: Jeff Cirillo, Mike Matheny, Marshall Boze
- 1992: Bobby Hughes, Danny Perez, Tim Unroe; Danan Hughes played minor league baseball for the 1992 and 1993 seasons in the Pioneer League for the Helena Brewers. He decided to make football his full-time profession when the Kansas City Chiefs selected him in the 7th round of the 1993 NFL Draft. Hughes played for the Chiefs from 1993 to 1998 as a wide receiver and special teams player.
- 1993: Brian Banks, Todd Dunn, Danny Klassen, Mark Loretta, Sean Maloney, Greg Martinez
- 1994: Antone Williamson, Kelly Wunsch
- 1995: Robinson Cancel, Geoff Jenkins, Mike Kinkade, Mickey Lopez, Greg Mullins
- 1996: Allen Levrault, Mark Watson
- 1997: Jason Childers, Brian Mallette
- 1998: Matt Childers, Bill Hall, Luis Martinez
- 2003: Drew Anderson, Carlos Corporán, Tim Dillard, Dana Eveland, Vinny Rottino, Mitch Stetter, Ty Taubenheim
- 2004: Alcides Escobar
- 2005: Michael Brantley, Ryan Braun, Lorenzo Cain, Darren Ford, Matt Gamel, Ángel Salomé, Joe Thatcher
- 2006: Zach Braddock, Cole Gillespie, Taylor Green, Mike McClendon
- 2007: Dane De La Rosa, Eric Farris, Eric Fryer, Caleb Gindl, Donovan Hand, Matt LaPorta, Jonathan Lucroy, Zelous Wheeler
- 2008: Erik Komatsu, Lucas Luetge, Wily Peralta, Logan Schafer, Rob Wooten
- 2009: Chris Capuano, Khristopher Davis, Michael Fiers, Sean Halton, Jake Odorizzi, Josh Prince
- 2010: Hiram Burgos, Jimmy Nelson, Caleb Thielbar, Tyler Thornburg
- 2011: Tyler Cravy, David Goforth, Yadiel Rivera, Jason Rodgers
- 2012: Michael Reed, Tyler Wagner
- 2018: Max Lazar
