= Kindrick Legion Field =

Baseball park in Helena, Montana

- Location in Montana
- Former names: Legion Park, Memorial Park Field
- Address: 1300 N. Ewing Street; Helena, Montana; United States
- Coordinates: 46°35′57″N 112°01′38″W
- Owner: City of Helena
- Capacity: 2,100
- Surface: Natural Grass (Turf in foul territory)
- Field size: Left field: 325 ft (99 m); Center field: 385 ft (117 m); Right field: 310 ft (94 m)

Construction
- Groundbreaking: 1932
- Opened: August 24, 1932
- Renovated: 2024
- Cost: $1,500 ($35,396 in 2025 dollars)

Tenants
- Helena Brewers (PL) 1978–2000; 2003–2018; Helena American Legion Baseball

Kindrick Legion Field is a baseball park located in Helena, Montana which serves as the home field of three American Legion teams: the Senators, Reps, and Independents. It was previously the home ballpark of the Helena Brewers Minor League Baseball team who left after the 2018 season. The stadium was built in 1932 and holds 2,100 people.

Formerly called Legion Park, and later Memorial Park Field, the name of the ballpark was changed in the mid-1970s to Kindrick Legion Field in honor of longtime American Legion supporter Ace Kindrick.

City officials are considering the best future use for the field after the departure of the Helena Brewers: continue with just American Legion ball or seek to add a team from the collegiate summer Expedition League.
