= Ariel Peña =

Dominican baseball player (born 1989)

- Pitcher
- Born: May 20, 1989 (age 37); Los Jovillos, Dominican Republic
- Batted: Right Threw: Right

MLB debut
- September 5, 2015, for the Milwaukee Brewers

Last MLB appearance
- April 4, 2016, for the Milwaukee Brewers

MLB statistics
- Win–loss record: 2–1
- Earned run average: 4.28
- Strikeouts: 27
- Stats at Baseball Reference

Teams
- Milwaukee Brewers (2015–2016)

Ariel Peña Mora (born May 20, 1989) is a Dominican former professional baseball pitcher. He played in Major League Baseball (MLB) from 2015 to 2016 for the Milwaukee Brewers. He throws a four-seam fastball, a two-seam fastball, a slider and a changeup.

== Career ==
=== Los Angeles Angels of Anaheim ===
On March 24, 2007, Peña signed as an international free agent with the Los Angeles Angels of Anaheim.

=== Milwaukee Brewers ===
The Angels traded Peña, Johnny Hellweg, and Jean Segura to the Milwaukee Brewers for Zack Greinke on July 27, 2012.

The Brewers promoted Peña to the major leagues from the Colorado Springs Sky Sox of the Triple–A Pacific Coast League on September 4, 2015. He became the first reliever in Major League history to give up three home runs on Opening Day when Denard Span, Joe Panik and Buster Posey of the San Francisco Giants hit consecutive homers off him in the eighth inning on April 4, 2016.

=== Rieleros de Aguascalientes ===
On June 3, 2017, Peña signed with the Rieleros de Aguascalientes of the Mexican League. In 11 games (10 starts) for Aguascalientes, he logged a 5–2 record and 3.83 ERA with 58 strikeouts across 54 innings of work. Peña was released by the Rieleros on April 11, 2018.

=== Leones de Yucatán ===
On August 12, 2018, Peña signed with the Leones de Yucatán of the Mexican League. He made one start for the team, allowing 2 earned runs on 4 hits with 3 strikeouts across 3 2/3 innings. Peña became a free agent following the season.

=== Rieleros de Aguascalientes (second stint) ===
On January 25, 2019, Peña signed with the Rieleros de Aguascalientes of the Mexican League. In 6 starts for Aguascalientes, he struggled to a 9.43 ERA with 29 walks and 29 strikeouts over 21 innings pitched. Peña was released by the Rieleros on May 7.
