= Tyler Cravy =

American baseball player (born 1989)

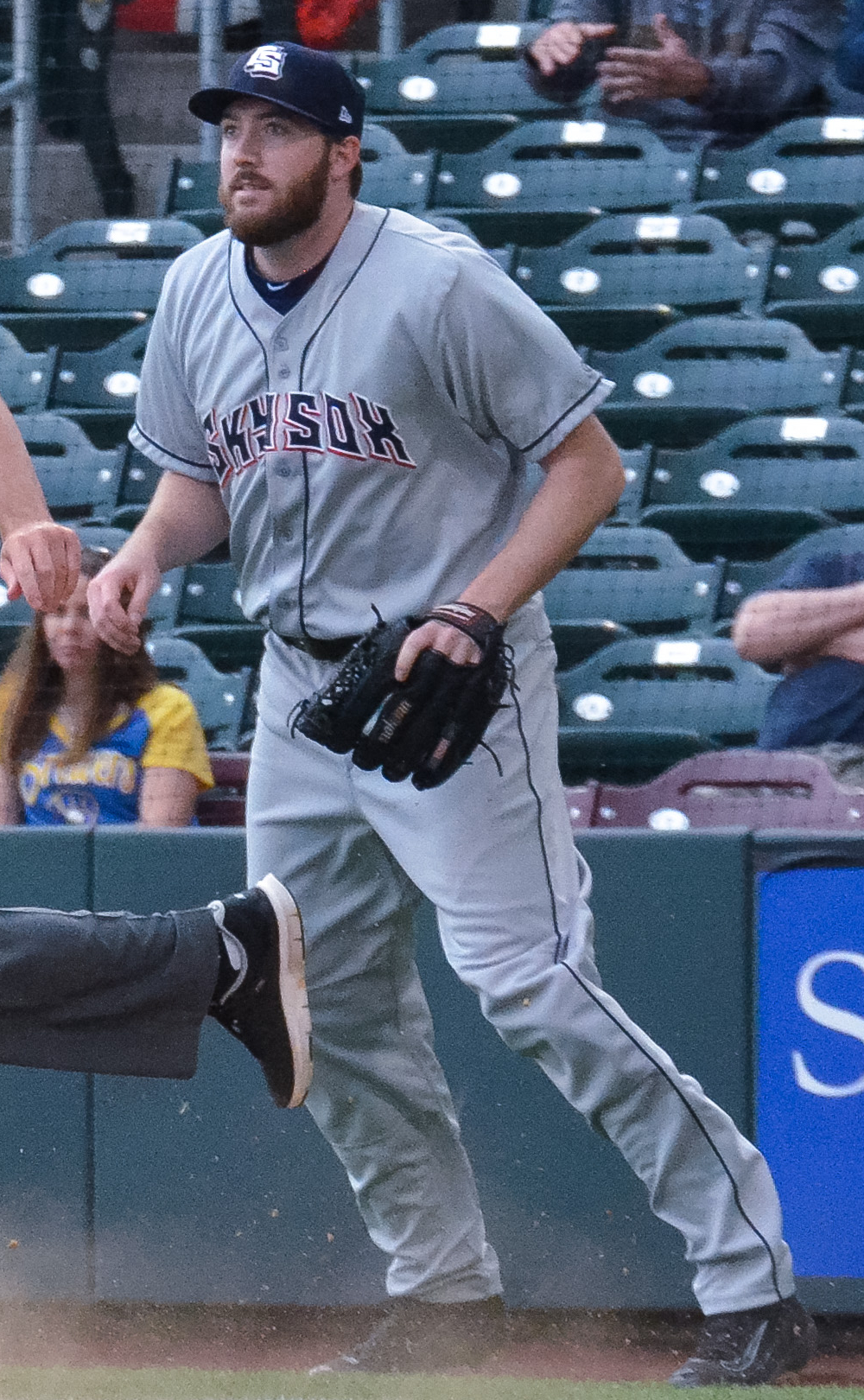
- Cravy with the Colorado Springs Sky Sox in 2016.
- Pitcher
- Born: July 13, 1989 (age 37); Vallejo, California, U.S.
- Batted: Right Threw: Right

MLB debut
- June 2, 2015, for the Milwaukee Brewers

Last MLB appearance
- October 2, 2016, for the Milwaukee Brewers

MLB statistics
- Win–loss record: 0–9
- Earned run average: 4.56
- Strikeouts: 57
- Stats at Baseball Reference

Teams
- Milwaukee Brewers (2015–2016)

Tyler Jay Cravy (born July 13, 1989) is an American former professional baseball pitcher. He played in Major League Baseball (MLB) for the Milwaukee Brewers.

== Amateur career ==
Cravy graduated from Hogan High School in Vallejo, California, in 2007. He also spent one semester in his sophomore year at Benicia High School in Benicia, California, but returned to Hogan. He had surgery to repair a hernia in 2008, and did not play baseball. After attending Diablo Valley College in 2008, he transferred to Napa Valley College in 2009, and pitched for their baseball team. He set a school record with 110 strikeouts in 90 1/3 innings pitched. Cravy was named the Bay Valley Conference's Most Valuable Player and a Community College Baseball All-American.

== Professional career ==
=== Milwaukee Brewers ===
The Milwaukee Brewers selected Cravy in the 17th round of the 2009 Major League Baseball draft. He signed with the Brewers, receiving a $75,000 signing bonus. He began his professional career with the Arizona Brewers of the Rookie-level Arizona League in 2009, and pitched for the Helena Brewers of the Rookie-level Pioneer League in 2010. After starting the 2011 season with the Wisconsin Timber Rattlers of the Single–A Midwest League, where he struggled with a 5.75 earned run average (ERA). The Brewers demoted him to Helena. Cravy returned to Wisconsin for the 2012 season, and he responded with a 3.38 ERA.

In 2013, Cravy pitched for the Brevard County Manatees of the High–A Florida State League, and he had a 4-2 win–loss record with a 2.04 ERA in 79 1/3 innings pitched. After the 2013 regular season, the Brewers assigned Cravy to the Surprise Saguaros of the Arizona Fall League. He began the 2014 season with the Huntsville Stars of the Double–A Southern League, and started the league's All-Star Game for the Northern Division. After pitching to an 8–1 record and a 1.72 ERA with Huntsville, the Brewers promoted Cravy to the Nashville Sounds of the Triple–A Pacific Coast League (PCL). In his first game with the Sounds, he strained his left oblique muscle, and missed the remainder of the 2014 regular season.

Cravy began the 2015 season with the Colorado Springs Sky Sox of the PCL. The Brewers added him to their 40-man roster and promoted to the major leagues on May 31. He was optioned back to Colorado Springs on June 3.

Spending spring training with the Brewers major league team, Cravy was the last player cut in spring training, the organization opting to send him to Triple–A Colorado Springs Sky Sox. He was called up to the active roster on April 2, 2016, when Matt Garza was put on the DL. The Brewers put Cravy in to more of a relieving role in 2016, and he appeared in 20 games.

An "on-the-bubble" player heading in to 2017, Cravy pitched around a 2.00 ERA in spring training and again was the final player cut, leading him to harshly criticize the Brewers management, saying that he may not report to the minor leagues but instead go to "a 9 to 5 job where I get treated like a human." Cravy also was a returning roster member, which made getting cut for the second straight year harder. He also took shots at the Brewers' management and general manager David Stearns, saying, "It says a lot about the integrity, or lack thereof, of the guys running the show." In later interviews Cravy labeled these comments as regrettable. On June 30, 2017, Cravy was removed from the 40-man roster and sent outright to Triple-A Colorado Springs. He spent the year in Triple–A, struggling to a 6.24 ERA with 38 strikeouts across 42 appearances out of the bullpen. Cravy elected free agency following the season on November 6.

=== York Revolution ===
On May 11, 2018, Cravy signed with the York Revolution of the independent Atlantic League of Professional Baseball. In nine appearances for the Revolution, he struggled to an 0-1 record and 9.45 ERA with four strikeouts across 6 2/3 innings pitched. Cravy was released by York on June 18.
