= Tyler Wagner =

American baseball player (born 1991)

- Pitcher
- Born: January 24, 1991 (age 35); Las Vegas, Nevada, U.S.
- Batted: Right Threw: Right

MLB debut
- May 31, 2015, for the Milwaukee Brewers

Last MLB appearance
- April 24, 2016, for the Arizona Diamondbacks

MLB statistics
- Win–loss record: 1–2
- Earned run average: 4.94
- Strikeouts: 12
- Stats at Baseball Reference

Teams
- Milwaukee Brewers (2015); Arizona Diamondbacks (2016)

Tyler Joseph Wagner (born January 24, 1991) is an American former professional baseball pitcher. He played in Major League Baseball (MLB) for the Milwaukee Brewers and Arizona Diamondbacks.

== College career ==
Wagner played college baseball at the University of Utah for the Utah Utes from 2010 to 2012 as a relief pitcher. As a sophomore in 2011, Wagner set the Utes single-season saves record with 12 and finished his career with a school record 17 saves. Overall, he appeared in 57 games in his three seasons in Utah, going 6–10 with a 2.73 earned run average (ERA) and 90 strikeouts in 99 innings.

== Professional career ==
=== Milwaukee Brewers ===
==== Minor leagues ====
Wagner was drafted by the Milwaukee Brewers in the fourth round, with the 155th overall selection, of the 2012 Major League Baseball draft. He signed with the Brewers and was converted to a starting pitcher. made his professional debut that season with the rookie-level Helena Brewers. Wagner struggled posting a 7.77 ERA in 48 2/3 innings. Wagner pitched for the Wisconsin Timber Rattlers in 2013 going 10–8 with a 3.21 ERA with 116 strikeouts. He played for the Brevard County Manatees in 2014, and finished the season with 13 wins and a 1.86 ERA. After the regular season, he was promoted to the Double-A Huntsville Stars for the Southern League playoffs.

==== Major leagues ====
The Brewers promoted Wagner to make his major league debut on May 31. After one start, they optioned him back to the Biloxi Shuckers of the Southern League. Wagner made 3 starts for the Brewers in 2015, posting an 0–2 record, 7.24 ERA, and 5 strikeouts in 13 2/3 total innings.

=== Arizona Diamondbacks ===
On January 30, 2016, Wagner was traded to the Arizona Diamondbacks along with Jean Segura in exchange for Aaron Hill, Chase Anderson, Isan Díaz, and cash considerations. Wagner made three total appearances for the Diamondbacks during the regular season, compiling a 1-0 record and 1.80 ERA with seven strikeouts across 10 innings pitched.

=== Texas Rangers ===
Wagner was claimed off waivers by the Texas Rangers on November 18, 2016. On April 19, 2017, Wagner was removed from the 40-man roster and sent outright to the Triple-A Round Rock Express. He made 29 appearances (21 starts) for Round Rock, struggling to a 3-11 record and 6.25 ERA with 88 strikeouts and three saves across 125 1/3 innings pitched.

In 2018, Wagner played in 25 games (including 18 starts) for the Double–A Frisco RoughRiders and Triple–A Round Rock, accumulating a 4.76 ERA with 59 strikeouts across 104 innings pitched. He elected free agency following the season on November 2, 2018.
