= Michael Blazek =

American baseball player (born 1989)

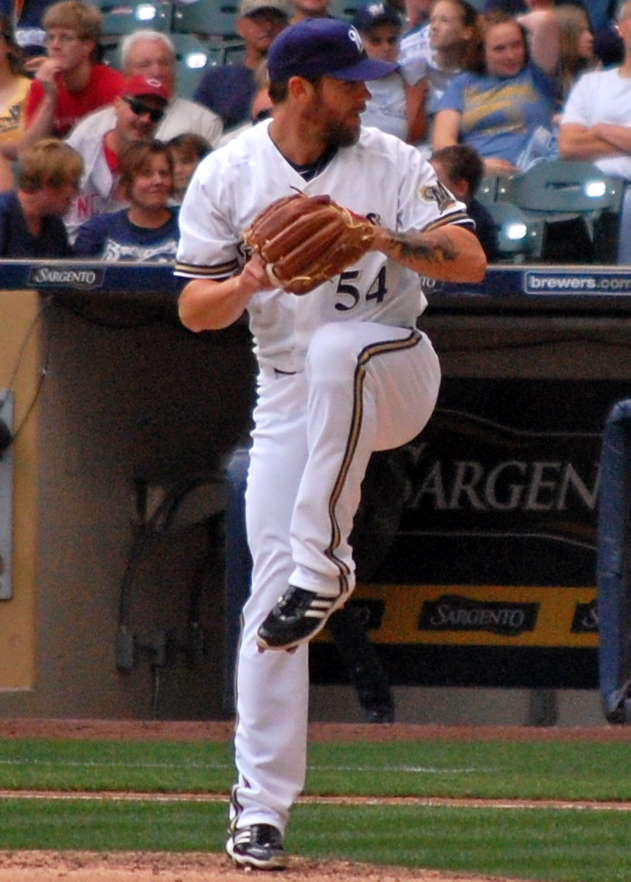
- Blazek with Milwaukee Brewers
- Pitcher
- Born: March 16, 1989 (age 37); Las Vegas, Nevada, U.S.
- Batted: Right Threw: Right

MLB debut
- June 22, 2013, for the St. Louis Cardinals

Last MLB appearance
- July 30, 2019, for the Washington Nationals

MLB statistics
- Win–loss record: 8–6
- Earned run average: 4.50
- Strikeouts: 104
- Stats at Baseball Reference

Teams
- St. Louis Cardinals (2013); Milwaukee Brewers (2013, 2015–2017); Washington Nationals (2019)

Michael Robert Blazek (/ˈbleɪzɛk/ BLAY-zek; born March 16, 1989) is an American former professional baseball pitcher. He played in Major League Baseball (MLB) for the St. Louis Cardinals, Milwaukee Brewers, and Washington Nationals.

== Career ==
Blazek attended Arbor View High School in Las Vegas. After originally signing with the University of Nevada as an infielder, Blazek later switched to sign with the College of Southern Nevada. After throwing in front of scouts in the St. Louis Cardinals organization, including current Houston Astros general manager Jeff Luhnow, Blazek was selected in the 35th round, with the 1,068th overall selection, of the 2007 MLB draft.

=== St. Louis Cardinals ===
Blazek climbed his way through the minor leagues, originally as a starting pitcher. In 2011, Blazek made the Texas League All-Star Game after going 8–3 in the first half with a 5.31 ERA with Double-A Springfield. Blazek was converted to a relief pitcher in 2012, and in 40 games with Springfield, he went 5–8 with a 4.16 ERA, striking out 83 in 80 innings. After the season, Blazek had his contract purchased by the Cardinals, protecting from the Rule V Draft.

After 17 appearances and an 0.92 ERA to begin the 2013 season at Springfield, the Cardinals promoted Blazek to the major leagues for the first time. However, Blazek did not make an appearance before being optioned to Triple-A Memphis, making room for Michael Wacha. Blazek was recalled by the Cardinals on June 22, and made his major league debut the same night in a relief appearance, throwing a scoreless inning against the Texas Rangers. All told, Blazek was recalled to the majors and sent back down 4 times during the 2013 season by St. Louis. On September 1, he was included as the player to be named later in the trade that brought reliever John Axford from the Milwaukee Brewers two days earlier. With the Cardinals, Blazek made 11 appearances with a 6.97 ERA, walking 10 and striking out 10 in 10.1 innings.

=== Milwaukee Brewers ===
With Memphis at the time of the trade, Blazek joined the Brewers bullpen, making 7 appearances that September for a Milwaukee team well out of the postseason picture. He threw an inning in each appearance and gave up 4 runs. Blazek spent the entire 2014 season with the Triple-A Nashville Sounds, where he began the year as a reliever, but was later moved into the rotation. In 20 appearances as a reliever, Blazek was 0–3 with a 5.68 ERA, and opposing batters hit .358 against him. However, in 17 starts, Blazek went 4–1 with a 3.62 ERA and a .235 OBA.

Blazek made his first Opening Day roster in 2015 with the Brewers. That season was a career year for the then-26 year old, as Blazek made 45 appearances in relief for Milwaukee, going 5–3 with a 2.43 ERA in 55 2/3 innings, with a 7.6 K/9 and a 2.9 BB/9. His season came to an abrupt end when he was placed on the disabled list with a fracture in his right hand on August 14. Blazek again made the club in 2016, but endured two stints on the disabled list and one stint with the Triple-A Colorado Springs Sky Sox in a drop-off from his 2015 season. Despite being activated off the disabled list on September 3, Blazek made just one appearance down the stretch for Milwaukee. In 41 appearances with Milwaukee in 2016, Blazek had a 5.66 ERA in 41 1/3 innings, with a 7.8 K/9 and a 5.9 BB/9, nearly twice as high as the year prior.

After not making the club out of spring training in 2017, Blazek was designated for assignment on April 5, making room for new acquisition Nick Franklin. Blazek remained in the organization, however, and after 3 months of pitching in Triple-A, Blazek was called up to join the bullpen in Milwaukee. Blazek was moved to the rotation at Triple-A in May, and he went 2–2 with a 3.06 ERA in 9 starts with 3.0 BB/9 and 7.3 K/9 before his call-up.

On July 27, Blazek made his first career major league start, taking the injured Matt Garza's turn in the rotation. He gave up 8 runs in 2 1/3 innings against Washington while allowing 6 home runs. Of those, 5 came in the third inning, the most allowed in a single inning in major league history, and 4 were given up to consecutive batters. Blazek was designated for assignment on August 13, to make room for the newly-acquired Neil Walker on the 40 man roster. He cleared waivers and was sent outright to Triple-A Colorado Springs Sky Sox on August 16. Blazek became a free agent following the season on October 6.

=== Arizona Diamondbacks ===
On January 22, 2018, Blazek signed a minor league deal with the Arizona Diamondbacks. He split the season between the rookie–level Arizona League Diamondbacks, Double–A Jackson Generals, and Triple–A Reno Aces. In 13 games split between the three affiliates, Blazek accumulated a 4.05 ERA with 18 strikeouts across 13 1/3 innings pitched. He elected free agency following the season on November 2.

=== Washington Nationals ===
On April 5, 2019, Blazek signed with the Lincoln Saltdogs of the independent American Association. However, prior to the start of the season on May 11, his contract was purchased by the Washington Nationals. On July 22, the Nationals selected his contract. On July 23, 2019, Blazek made his first appearance for the Nationals, throwing two innings and giving up 1 run on 3 hits. He was designated for assignment on July 31, 2019. He cleared waivers and was sent outright to Triple-A Fresno Grizzlies on August 3. Blazek elected free agency on October 1, 2019.

=== Southern Maryland Blue Crabs ===
On March 12, 2020, Blazek signed with the Southern Maryland Blue Crabs of the Atlantic League of Professional Baseball. He did not play a game for the team because of the cancellation of the ALPB season due to the COVID-19 pandemic and became a free agent after the year.
