= Wily Peralta =

Dominican baseball player (born 1989)

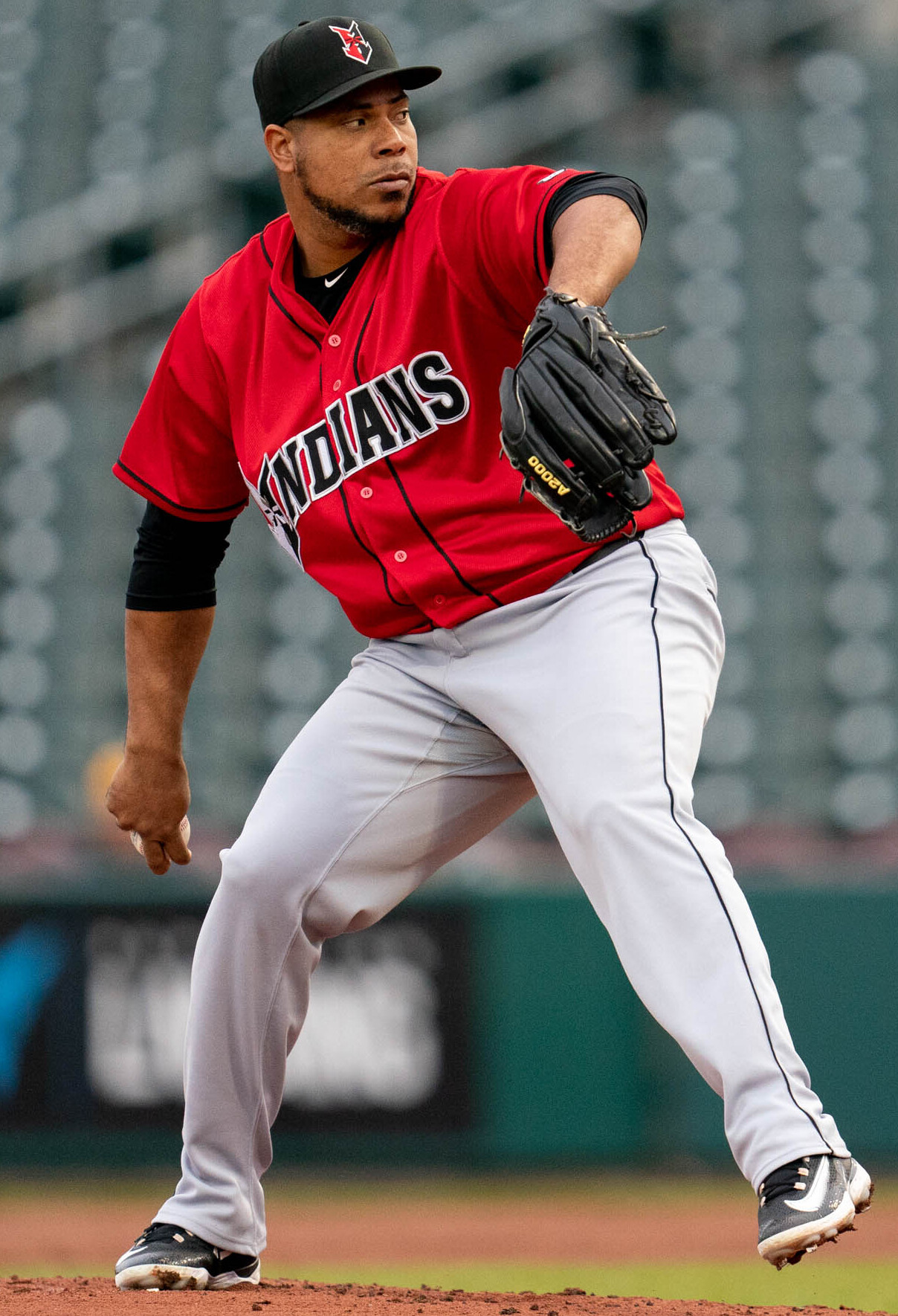
- Peralta with the Indianapolis Indians in 2024

Free agent
- Pitcher
- Born: May 8, 1989 (age 37); Samaná, Dominican Republic
- Bats: Right Throws: Right

MLB debut
- April 22, 2012, for the Milwaukee Brewers

MLB statistics (through 2022 season)
- Win–loss record: 56–61
- Earned run average: 4.29
- Strikeouts: 660
- Stats at Baseball Reference

Teams
- Milwaukee Brewers (2012–2017); Kansas City Royals (2018–2019); Detroit Tigers (2021–2022)

Wily Peralta (born May 8, 1989) is a Dominican professional baseball pitcher who is a free agent. He has previously played in Major League Baseball (MLB) for the Milwaukee Brewers, Kansas City Royals, and Detroit Tigers.

== Early life ==
Peralta grew up in Samaná, Dominican Republic, but moved to Santo Domingo when he was 11 in order to train with his uncle. He did not own a baseball glove until he was 11 years old. He practiced throwing with a lemon.

== Career ==
=== Milwaukee Brewers ===
==== Minor leagues ====
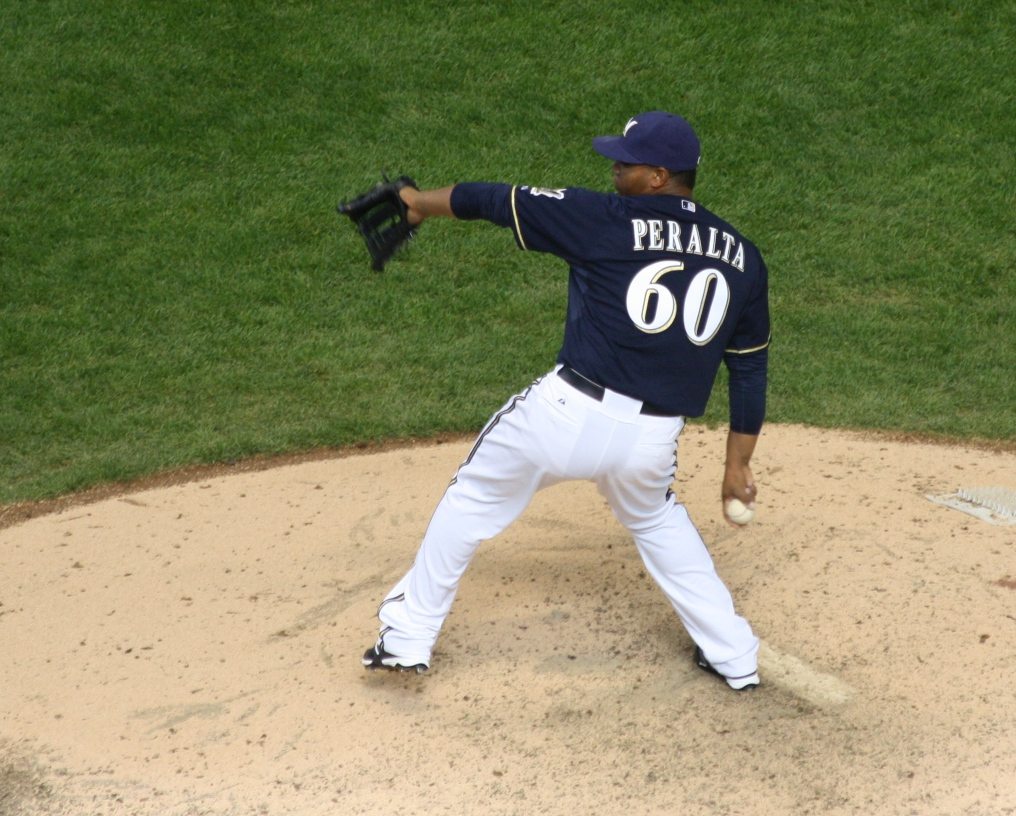
Peralta in his major league debut

Peralta was signed by the Brewers as a free agent in 2006. He played his first professional season in America for the rookie-level Arizona League Brewers that season. After sitting out the 2007 season, he returned in 2008, playing for the rookie-level Helena Brewers and Single-A West Virginia Power. Peralta played for the Single-A Wisconsin Timber Rattlers in 2009. He split the 2010 season between the High-A Brevard County Manatees and Double-A Huntsville Stars. He was added to the Brewers' 40-man roster following the season, in order to remain protected from the Rule 5 draft.

Peralta began the 2011 season with Huntsville. He was promoted to the Triple-A Nashville Sounds late in the season.

==== Major leagues ====
The Brewers promoted Peralta to the MLB roster on April 21, 2012, to replace Kameron Loe. He recorded his first MLB start on September 5, against the Miami Marlins. In six appearances (five starts) for Milwaukee during his rookie campaign, Peralta logged a 2-1 record and 2.48 ERA with 23 strikeouts over 29 innings of work.

On July 9, 2013, Peralta pitched his first MLB career complete game against the Cincinnati Reds, the first complete game pitched by a Brewers pitcher since April 5, 2011, by Yovani Gallardo. He made 32 starts for the Brewers on the year, compiling an 11-15 record and 4.37 ERA with 129 strikeouts across 183 1/3 innings pitched.

Peralta enjoyed a career year in 2014, making another 32 starts, in which he posted a 17-11 record and 3.53 ERA with 154 strikeouts across 198 2/3 innings pitched. Peralta dealt with an extended disabled list stint in 2015, managing a 5-10 record and 4.72 ERA with 60 strikeouts in 108 2/3 innings across 20 starts. In 2016, Peralta battled with inconsistency and injuries for a second straight season, as he finished 7–11 with a 4.86 ERA and 93 strikeouts in 127 2/3 innings pitched over 23 starts.

After struggling to begin the 2017 season, Peralta was shifted to the bullpen on June 5, 2017. He was designated for assignment by Milwaukee on July 28. In 19 appearances (eight starts) for the team, Peralta had struggled to a 5-4 record and 7.85 ERA with 52 strikeouts over 57 1/3 innings of work. He cleared waivers and was sent outright to Triple-A Nashville on August 3. Peralta elected free agency on October 6.

=== Kansas City Royals ===
On December 5, 2017, Peralta signed a one-year, $1.5 million contract with the Kansas City Royals. His contract included a $3 million club option for the 2019 season. Peralta was designated for assignment on March 28, 2018. He cleared waivers and was outrighted to the Triple–A Omaha Storm Chasers. He was recalled by the Royals on June 17. During the month of June, he made five appearances in relief, allowing one run in 4 2/3 innings pitched and recording two saves. On the season, Peralta pitched exclusively out of the bullpen, recording 14 saves in 37 appearances.

Peralta made 42 relief appearances for Kansas City during the 2019 season, registering a 2-4 record and 5.80 ERA with 24 strikeouts and two saves across 40 1/3 innings pitched. On July 20, 2019, Peralta was designated for assignment. On July 24, Peralta was released by the Royals after clearing waivers.

=== Detroit Tigers ===
On February 18, 2021, after spending the 2020 season as a free agent, Peralta signed a minor league contract with the Detroit Tigers organization and received an invitation to Spring Training. He was assigned to the Triple-A Toledo Mud Hens to begin the year, and recorded a 2.75 ERA in 6 appearances. On June 15, Peralta was selected to the active roster. On June 30, Peralta recorded his first win as a starter since 2017, allowing one run (zero earned) and three hits over five innings in a victory over the Cleveland Indians. Peralta made 18 starts for the 2021 Tigers, posting a 4–5 record with a 3.07 ERA.

On March 16, 2022, Peralta was signed to another minor league contract with an invitation to spring training. On April 16, the Tigers selected Peralta's contract. He made 28 appearances for the team, recording a 2-0 record and 2.58 ERA with 32 strikeouts in 38.1 innings pitched. On August 19, the Tigers designated Peralta for assignment. He was released on August 22.

=== Washington Nationals ===
On January 31, 2023, Peralta signed a minor league contract with the Washington Nationals organization. In 24 starts for the Triple–A Rochester Red Wings, he struggled to a 3–8 record and 6.31 ERA with 100 strikeouts across 102 2/3 innings pitched. Peralta elected free agency following the season on November 6.

=== Pittsburgh Pirates ===
On January 31, 2024, Peralta signed a minor league contract with the Pittsburgh Pirates. On March 25, Peralta was reassigned to minor league camp. He made 17 appearances for the Triple–A Indianapolis Indians, struggling to a 7.44 ERA with 29 strikeouts across 32 2/3 innings pitched. Peralta was released by the Pirates organization on June 9.

=== Dorados de Chihuahua ===
On May 19, 2025, Peralta signed with the Dorados de Chihuahua of the Mexican League. In 12 starts, he posted a 4–5 record with a 7.80 ERA and 41 strikeouts across 57 2/3 innings. On April 14, 2026, Peralta was released by Chihuahua.
