= Shane Peterson =

American baseball player (born 1988)

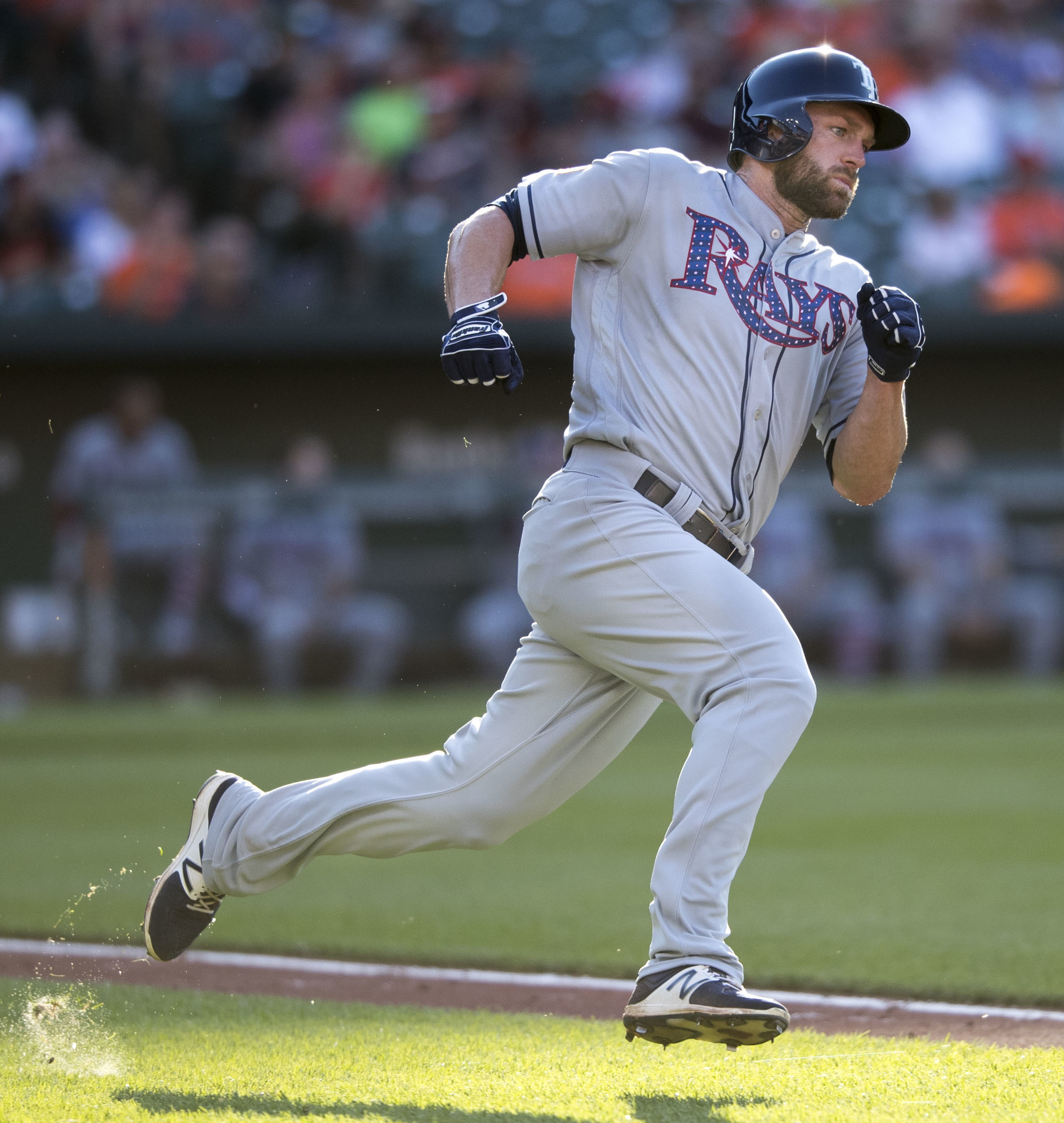
- Peterson with the Tampa Bay Rays
- Outfielder
- Born: February 11, 1988 (age 38); Fallbrook, California, U.S.
- Batted: Left Threw: Left

MLB debut
- April 16, 2013, for the Oakland Athletics

Last MLB appearance
- July 23, 2017, for the Tampa Bay Rays

MLB statistics
- Batting average: .254
- Home runs: 4
- Runs batted in: 28
- Stats at Baseball Reference

Teams
- Oakland Athletics (2013); Milwaukee Brewers (2015); Tampa Bay Rays (2017)

Shane Aaron Peterson (born February 11, 1988) is an American former professional baseball outfielder. He played in Major League Baseball (MLB) for the Oakland Athletics, Milwaukee Brewers, and Tampa Bay Rays.

== Career ==
=== Amateur ===
Peterson attended California State University, Long Beach, and in 2007 he played collegiate summer baseball with the Hyannis Mets of the Cape Cod Baseball League where he was named a league all-star.

=== St. Louis Cardinals ===
Peterson was selected by the St. Louis Cardinals in the second round, with the 59th overall selection, of the 2008 Major League Baseball draft. He made his professional debut with the Low-A Batavia Muckdogs, hitting .291/.400/.409 with one home run, 39 RBI, and three stolen bases across 65 appearances. Peterson began the 2009 season with the High-A Palm Beach Cardinals, later receiving a promotion to the Double-A Springfield Cardinals.

=== Oakland Athletics ===
On July 24, 2009, Peterson was traded to the Oakland Athletics in exchange for Matt Holliday. He made 39 appearances down the stretch for the Double-A Midland RockHounds, slashing .273/.333/.396 with three home runs, 17 RBI, and four stolen bases.

Returning to Midland in 2010, Peterson slashed .265/.354/.367 with five home runs, 59 RBI, and 11 stolen bases over 128 appearances. He made 105 appearances split between Midland and the Triple-A Sacramento River Cats during the 2011 season, batting a cumulative .274/.366/.421 with nine home runs, 59 RBI, and 13 stolen bases.

Peterson split the 2012 campaign between Midland and Sacramento, hitting a combined .326/.460/.510 with nine home runs, 46 RBI, and 13 stolen bases in 87 total games. On November 20, 2012, Oakland added Peterson to their 40-man roster to protect him from the Rule 5 draft.

On April 16, 2013, Peterson made his MLB debut against the Houston Astros, going 0-for-4 with two strikeouts; he made his second and final appearance of the year the following day, and recorded his first career hit in the game (off of Houston reliever Xavier Cedeño. He spent the remainder of the year with Sacramento, hitting .251/.358/.387 with 12 home runs, 79 RBI, and 17 stolen bases across 126 appearances.

Peterson spent the entirety of the 2014 season with Sacramento, playing in 137 games for the River Cats, in which he slashed .308/.381/.460 with 11 home runs, 90 RBI, and 11 stolen bases. On December 11, 2014, Peterson was designated for assignment by the Athletics.

=== Milwaukee Brewers ===
On December 19, 2014, Peterson was claimed off waivers by the Chicago Cubs. On December 23, Peterson was claimed off waivers by the Milwaukee Brewers. In 93 games for the Brewers in 2015, he batted .259/.324/.353 with two home runs and 16 RBI.

Peterson was designated for assignment by the Brewers on January 29, 2016. He cleared waivers and was sent outright to the Triple–A Colorado Springs Sky Sox on February 4. Peterson was invited to the Brewers' spring training camp in mid-February to compete for the lone outfield position still open, and was one of nine players competing to be the Brewers' center fielder for the 2016 season. Peterson did not win a job and spent the year with Colorado Springs, hitting .347/.429/.694 with three home runs, seven RBI, and four stolen bases. He elected free agency following the season on November 7.

=== Tampa Bay Rays ===
On December 19, 2016, Peterson signed a minor league contract with the Tampa Bay Rays. On April 14, 2017, he was called up to play an away game against the Boston Red Sox where he hit a two-run home run in his first at-bat as a member of the Rays. Peterson made 30 total appearances for Tampa Bay, hitting .253/.310/.392 with two home runs, 11 RBI, and two stolen bases. On July 28, Peterson was designated for assignment by the Rays.

=== San Diego Padres ===
On December 21, 2017, Peterson signed a minor league contract with the San Diego Padres. In 126 games for the Triple–A El Paso Chihuahuas, he batted .286/.343/.451 with 11 home runs and 74 RBI. Peterson elected free agency following the season on November 2, 2018.

=== Los Angeles Dodgers ===
On December 30, 2018, Peterson signed a minor league contract with the Los Angeles Dodgers. In 79 games for the Triple–A Oklahoma City Dodgers, he batted .245/.313/.439 with 10 home runs and 38 RBI. Peterson elected free agency following the season on November 4, 2019.
