= Brevard County Manatees =

- 1994–2016; Viera, Florida
Team logo
Cap insignia

Minor league affiliations
- Class: Class A-Advanced (1994–2016)
- League: Florida State League (1994–2016)

Major league affiliations
- Team: Milwaukee Brewers (2005–2016); Montreal Expos (2002–2004); Florida Marlins (1994–2001)

Minor league titles
- League titles: 2001 (co-champions)
- Division titles: 1994; 2001; 2007

Team data
- Name: Brevard County Manatees (1994–2016)
- Colors: Blue, red, gold, gray, white
- Mascot: Hugh Manatee (1994-2001); Manny Manatee (2002-2016)
- Ballpark: Space Coast Stadium (1994–2016)

The Brevard County Manatees were a minor league baseball team of the Class A-Advanced Florida State League from 1994 to 2016. They were based in Viera, Florida, and played their home games at Space Coast Stadium. The team left Brevard County after the 2016 season for Kissimmee, Florida, where they began play in 2017 as the Florida Fire Frogs.

The team′s mascot was a manatee. From 1994 to 2001, he was named Hugh Manatee (a pun on "humanity"), and from 2002 to 2016 he was known as Manny Manatee.

== Team history ==
In 1994, the Manatees won the East Division title, but lost the Florida State League championship series to the Tampa Yankees in four games. They won the East Division again in 2001, but due to the September 11, 2001, terrorist attacks the league championship series was canceled and the Manatees and the West Division champion, the Tampa Yankees, were declared co-champions. In 2007, the Manatees won the North Division title but lost in the league championship series to the Clearwater Threshers in four games.

On August 12, 2009, the Manatees recorded the 1,000th win in franchise history with an 8–2 win over the Dunedin Blue Jays.

The Manatees were affiliated with the Florida Marlins from 1994 to 2001 and with the Montreal Expos from 2002 through 2004. From 2005 through 2016, they were an affiliate of the Milwaukee Brewers.

The Manatees played their last game on September 4, 2016, losing to the Daytona Tortugas 6–4 before a crowd of 1,573 at Space Coast Stadium. After the 2016 season, the team relocated to Kissimmee, Florida, to play its home games at Osceola County Stadium. The name of the team changed to the Florida Fire Frogs and its affiliation switched from the Brewers to the Atlanta Braves.

== Notable promotions ==
In April 2007, on "World Record First Pitch Attempt Day" the stadium was opened at 6:00 a.m. for the 7:00 p.m. game to allow each fan to throw a ceremonial first pitch. They were still short of the world record by several hundred pitches.

== Notable alumni ==
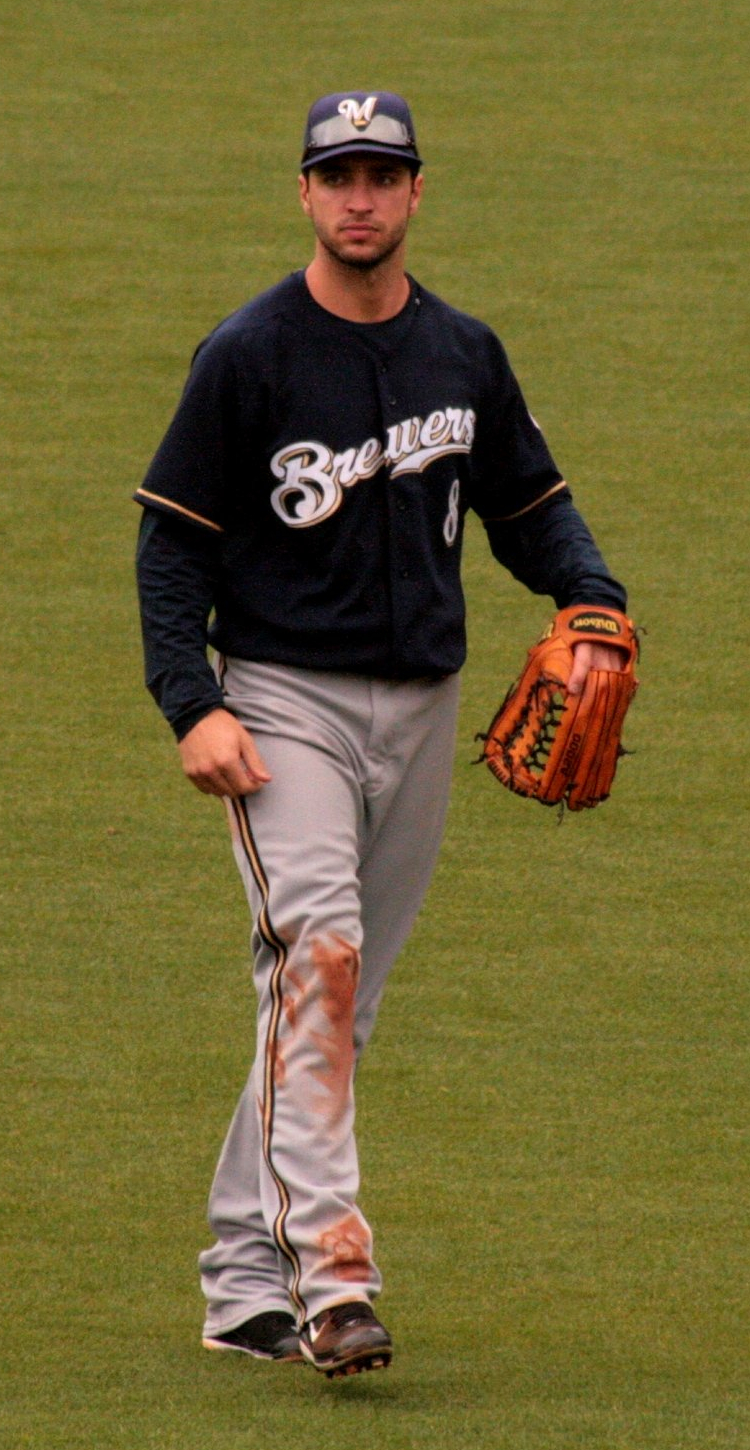
Ryan Braun

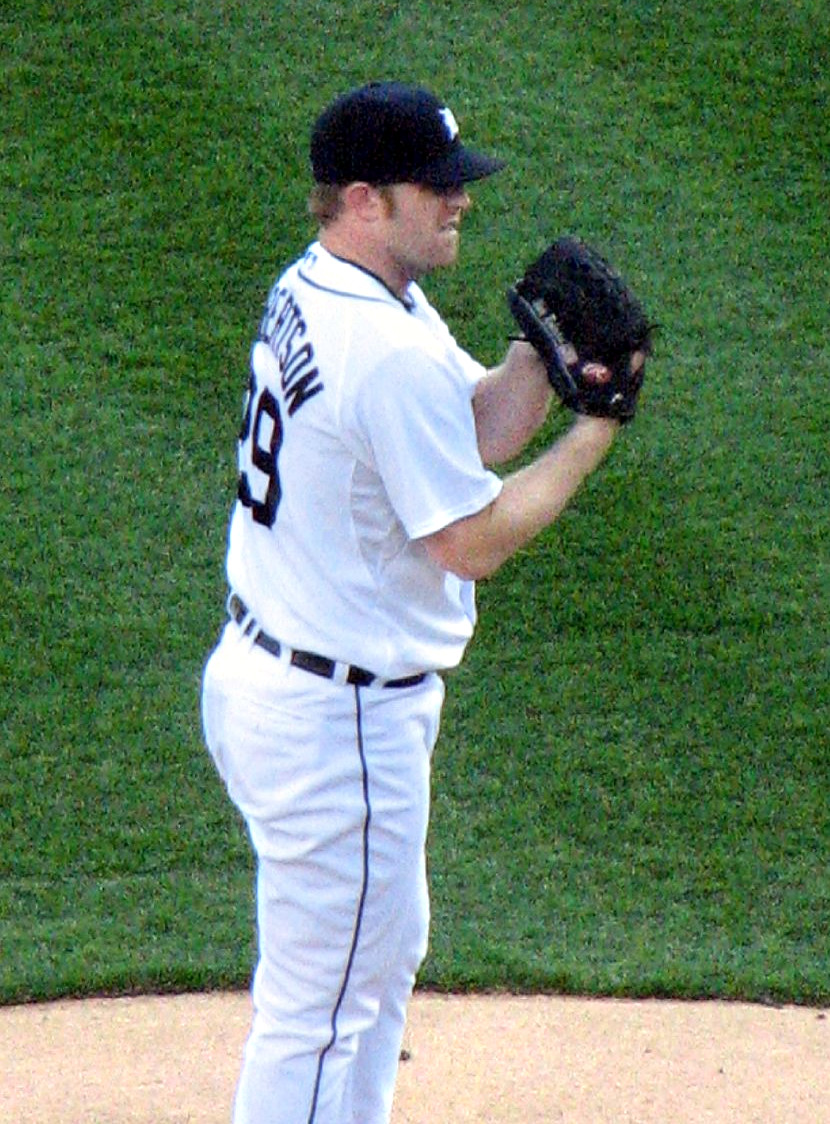
Nate Robertson

=== Baseball Hall of Fame alumni ===
- Andre Dawson (1995) 2010 Inductee
- Tim Raines (2004 as manager) 2017 Inductee

=== Notable alumni ===
- Orlando Arcia
- John Axford
- Josh Beckett
- Ryan Braun
- Hiram Burgos
- Josh Butler
- Lorenzo Cain
- Chad Cordero
- Tyler Cravy
- Khris Davis
- Ryan Dempster
- Alcides Escobar
- Yovani Gallardo
- Mat Gamel
- Scooter Gennett
- David Goforth
- Tom Gorzelanny
- Jim Henderson
- Félix Heredia
- Shawn Hill
- Jeremy Jeffress
- Taylor Jungmann
- Jonathan Lucroy
- Jorge Lopez
- Damien Magnifico
- Matt Mantei
- Mike McClendon
- Brian Meadows
- Randy Messenger
- Kevin Millar
- Jimmy Nelson
- Manny Parra
- Scott Podsednik
- Jay Powell
- Darrell Rasner
- Mike Redmond
- Michael Reed
- Édgar Rentería
- Yadiel Rivera
- Nate Robertson
- Tony Saunders
- Logan Schafer
- Grady Sizemore
- Brent Suter
- Joe Thatcher
- Luis Ugueto
- Carlos Villanueva
- Tyler Wagner
- Kelley Washington
- Randy Winn
- Chris Young

== Season-by-season results ==
Brevard County Manatees
Year	Regular Season			Postseason		
Year	Record	Win %	League	Record	Win %	Result
1994	78–61	.561	2nd	3–3	.500	Won East Division title vs West Palm Beach Expos, 2–0; Lost FSL Championship vs Tampa Yankees, 1–3
1995	61–74	.452	12th	—	—	—
1996	47–92	.338	14th	—	—	—
1997	62–76	.449	12th	—	—	—
1998	43–97	.307	14th	—	—	—
1999	61–74	.452	12th	—	—	—
2000	66–74	.471	10th	—	—	—
2001	80–55	.593	1st	2–1	.667	Won East Division title vs Vero Beach Dodgers, 2–1; FSL Championship series vs Tampa Yankees canceled due to September 11, 2001 attacks. Both teams are declared co-champions.
2002	51–85	.375	12th	—	—	—
2003	65–66	.496	7th	—	—	—
2004	53–72	.424	10th	—	—	—
2005	63–73	.463	10th	—	—	—
2006	64–65	.496	8th	—	—	—
2007	74–62	.544	4th	3–4	.429	Won East Division title vs St. Lucie Mets, 2–1; Lost FSL Championship vs Clearwater Threshers, 1–3
2008	66–72	.478	8th	—	—	—
2009	79–48	.622	1st	0–2	.000	Lost North Division title vs Tampa Yankees, 0–2
2010	64–75	.460	10th	—	—	—
2011	62–76	.449	11th	—	—	—
2012	63–72	.467	8th	—	—	—
2013	66–68	.493	7th	—	—	—
2014	73–62	.541	6th	—	—	—
2015	55–80	.407	9th	—	—	—
2016	40–97	.292	12th	—	—	—
Totals	1,436–1,676	.458	—	8–10	.444	1 League Co-Championship; 3 Division Titles
