= Yhonathan Barrios =

Colombian baseball player

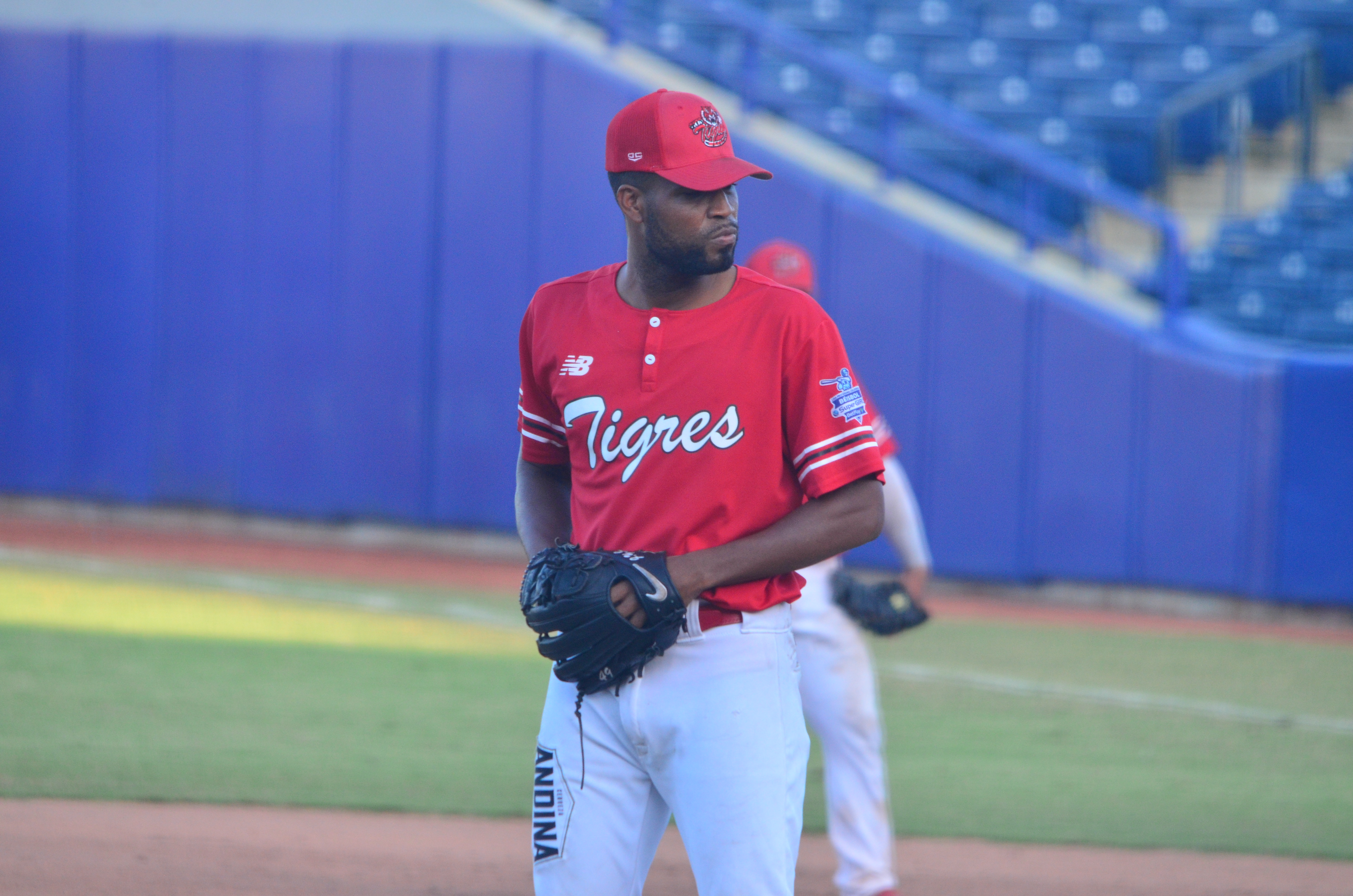
- Barrios with Tigres de Cartagena in 2020
- Pitcher
- Born: December 1, 1991 (age 33); Cartagena, Colombia
- Batted: Switch Threw: Right

MLB debut
- September 24, 2015, for the Milwaukee Brewers

Last MLB appearance
- October 4, 2015, for the Milwaukee Brewers

MLB statistics
- Win–loss record: 0–0
- Earned run average: 0.00
- Strikeouts: 7
- Stats at Baseball Reference

Teams
- Milwaukee Brewers (2015)

Yhonathan Barrios (born December 1, 1991) is a Colombian former professional baseball pitcher. He played in Major League Baseball (MLB) for the Milwaukee Brewers.

== Career ==
=== Pittsburgh Pirates ===
Barrios was signed by the Pittsburgh Pirates on July 5, 2008, as an infielder out of Colombia. The Pirates converted him to a pitcher in July 2013.

=== Milwaukee Brewers ===
On July 23, 2015, Barrios was traded to the Milwaukee Brewers in exchange for infielder Aramis Ramírez. He made his MLB debut on September 24. In his rookie campaign, Barrios logged five scoreless appearances with 7 strikeouts across 6 2/3 innings.

Barrios spent the 2016 season on the disabled list after suffering a shoulder injury. He was removed from the 40–man roster and sent outright to the Triple–A Colorado Springs SkySox on November 7. Barrios rejected the assignment and subsequently elected free agency.

On November 9, 2016, Barrios re–signed with the Brewers on a minor league contract, and received an invitation to spring training as a non–roster invitee. Barrios did not make an appearance for the organization in 2017, and elected free agency after the year on November 6, 2017.
