= Aramis Ramírez =

Dominican baseball player (born 1978)

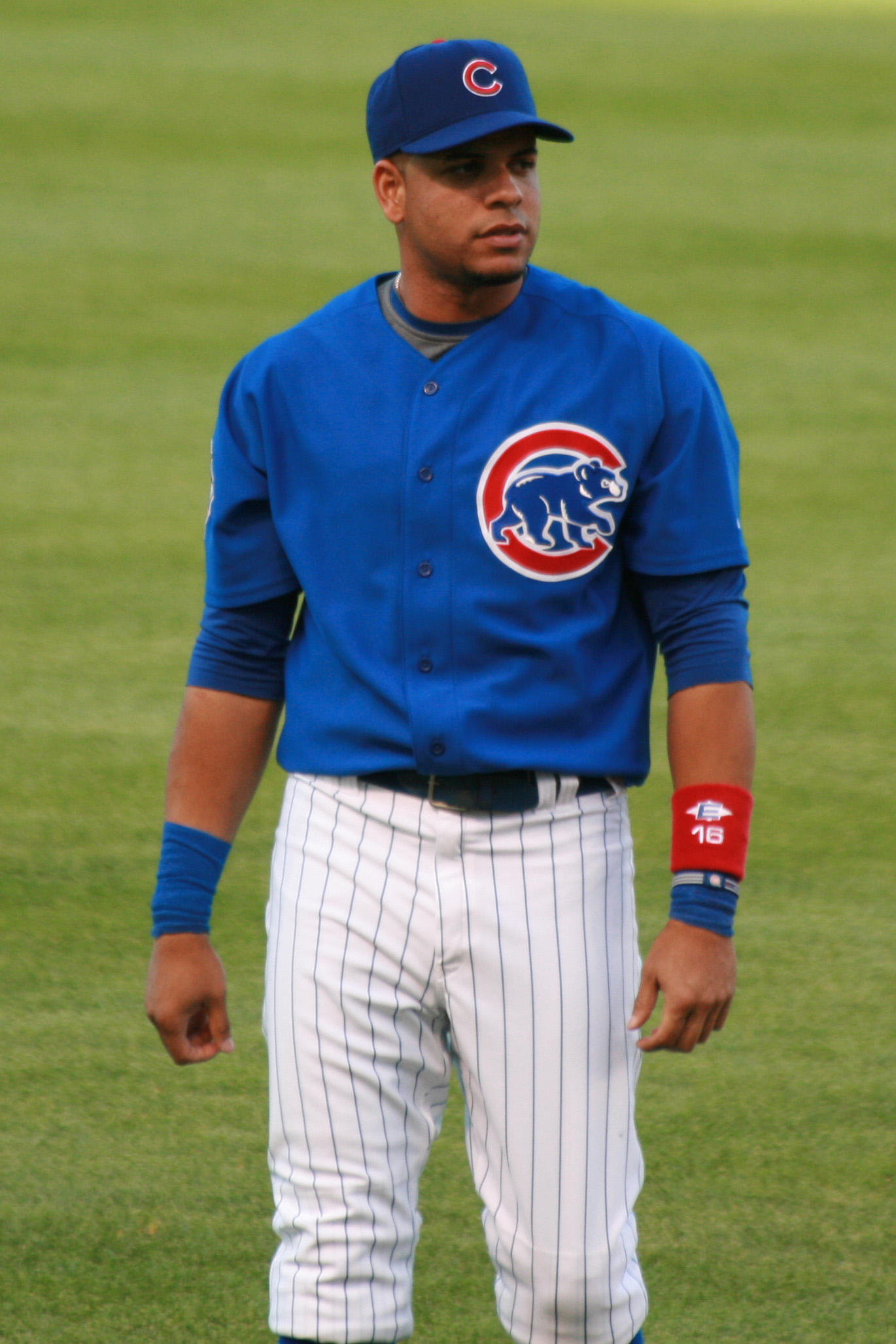
- Ramírez with the Chicago Cubs in 2008
- Third baseman
- Born: June 25, 1978 (age 48); Santo Domingo, Dominican Republic
- Batted: Right Threw: Right

MLB debut
- May 26, 1998, for the Pittsburgh Pirates

Last MLB appearance
- October 3, 2015, for the Pittsburgh Pirates

MLB statistics
- Batting average: .283
- Hits: 2,303
- Home runs: 386
- Runs batted in: 1,417
- Stats at Baseball Reference

Teams
- Pittsburgh Pirates (1998–2003); Chicago Cubs (2003–2011); Milwaukee Brewers (2012–2015); Pittsburgh Pirates (2015)

Career highlights and awards
- 3× All-Star (2005, 2008, 2014); Silver Slugger Award (2011); NL Hank Aaron Award (2008); Chicago Cubs Hall of Fame

Aramis Nin Ramírez (/əˈrɑːmɪs/; born June 25, 1978) is a Dominican former professional baseball third baseman, who played 18 seasons in Major League Baseball (MLB) for the Pittsburgh Pirates, Chicago Cubs, and Milwaukee Brewers. He was named an All-Star three times during his career.

He started his professional career with the Pirates in 1998, before being traded to the Chicago Cubs in 2003. On November 12, 2006, Ramírez signed a five-year deal with the Cubs. On December 12, 2011, he signed a three-year contract with the Milwaukee Brewers. On July 23, 2015, he was traded back to Pittsburgh exactly 12 years after they first traded him, where he would finish the remainder of his final season.

== Professional career ==
=== Pittsburgh Pirates ===
On November 7, 1994, Ramírez signed a contract with the Pittsburgh Pirates. On May 26, 1998, he made his major league debut with the Pirates, becoming the youngest player in MLB at that time.

Ramírez struggled in his first three seasons, splitting playing time between the Pirates and Triple-A Nashville Sounds. Playing with the Pirates for an entire season for the first time in 2001, Ramírez hit .300 with 34 home runs. In 2002, his batting performance dipped to .234 with 18 home runs.

=== Chicago Cubs ===
==== 2003 season ====
Ramírez was traded to the Chicago Cubs on July 23, 2003 with outfielder Kenny Lofton for José Hernández, Matt Bruback and a player to be named later (The Cubs sent Bobby Hill on August 15, 2003 to complete the trade). Ramírez finished the 2003 season strong in Chicago, though he led the majors with 33 errors at third base. He had the lowest fielding percentage of all Major League third basemen with .929. The Cubs made the playoffs and defeated the Atlanta Braves before being beaten by the eventual World Series champions Florida Marlins in the seven-game 2003 National League Championship Series. During the first inning of Game 4 of the NLCS, Ramírez hit the first playoff grand slam in Cubs history off Marlins starter Dontrelle Willis. Ramírez finished the series with three home runs, seven RBIs, and one triple.

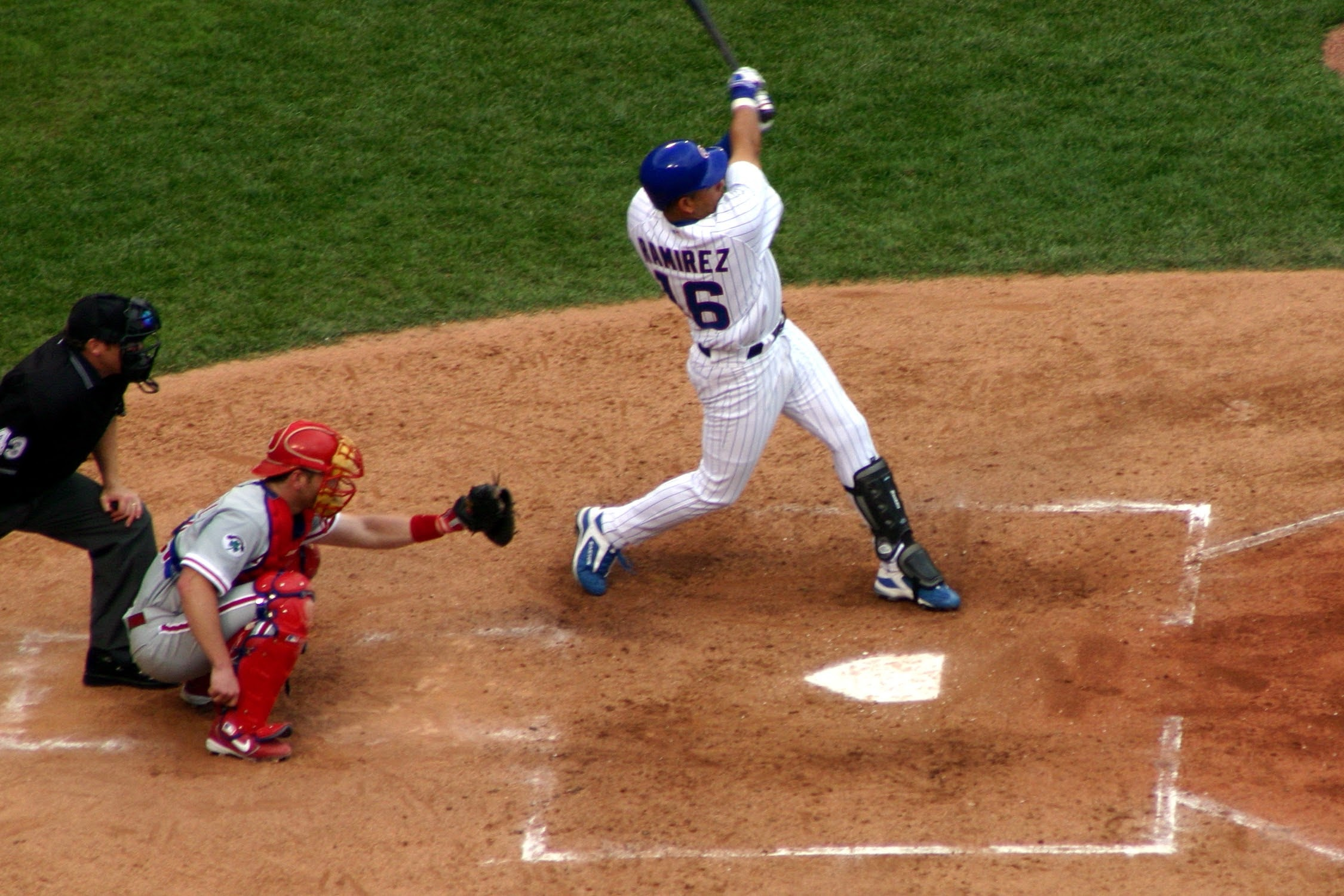
Ramirez hitting one of his three home runs during a game at Wrigley Field against the Philadelphia Phillies on July 30, 2004

==== 2004 season ====
On September 16, 2004, Ramírez became the 14th player in Major League history to have two different games with three home runs in a season. On defense, his range factor of 2.26 was the lowest among all Major League third basemen.

==== 2005 season ====
In 2005, he was elected to play in his first All-Star Game. Ramírez finished the season on the disabled list, after straining his quadriceps femoral muscle on August 24. He finished the season with 31 home runs and 92 RBIs.

==== 2006 season ====
In 2006, Ramírez hit 38 home runs and 119 RBIs. He collected his 1,000th hit on July 15 versus the New York Mets. On defense, his range factor of 2.41 was the lowest among Major League third basemen for the third straight year. After the season, he was listed as being potentially the biggest free agent in the market. Ramírez elected to stay with the Cubs, agreeing to a five-year, $73 million contract on November 12, 2006.

==== 2007 season ====
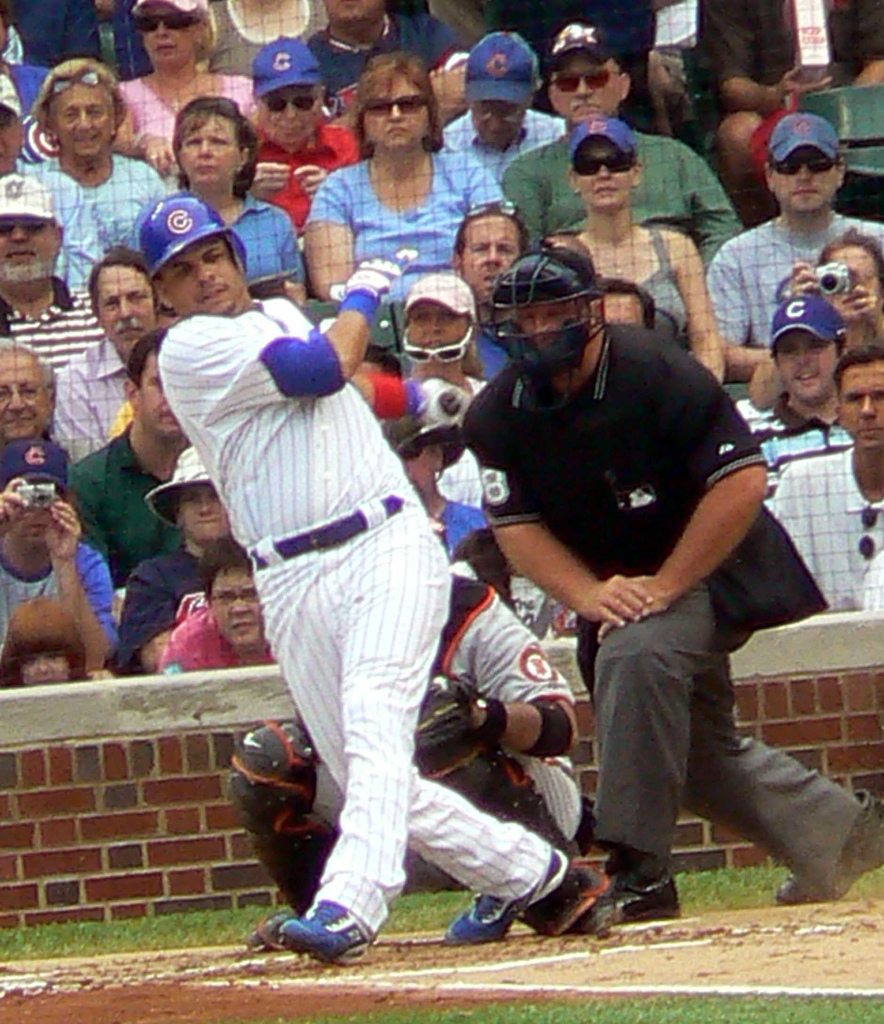
Ramírez takes a swing.

Ramírez hit his 200th career home run, off Claudio Vargas, on April 23, 2007. On June 29, 2007, Ramírez had one of the best games of his career, in which he went 3-for-5, highlighted by ending a crucial game against the Milwaukee Brewers with a two-out, two-run home run in the bottom of the ninth inning off pitcher, Francisco Cordero to cap a five-run comeback win. Many Cub fans saw this game as the best comeback win of the season, which also sparked a new rivalry with the Brewers.

The Cubs won the 2007 National League Central division. Ramírez finished the season with 101 RBIs, which led the team. He finished second on the Cubs in home runs (26) and batting average (.310). The divisional title came only after battling it out with Milwaukee for the final month of September. Ramírez made strides to improve his defensive game in 2007, as he lowered his error total and improved his range factor for the third consecutive year. Aramis Ramírez hit the longest home run of the season on 9/21/07, at 495 feet.

==== 2008 season ====
On June 20, in the bottom of the ninth inning, during the first game of the 2008 Crosstown Classic against the Chicago White Sox, Ramírez hit his 2nd home run of the day for a walk off. He went on to homer in each of the next two games in that series.

On July 7, Ramírez was selected to play in the All-Star Game as a reserve. Prior to Game 4 of the World Series, Ramírez was awarded the Hank Aaron Award as the most outstanding offensive performer in the National League. Ramírez finished the season with the lowest range factor (2.16) of all major league third basemen.

==== 2009 season ====
Ramírez got off to a quick start in 2009 with five RBIs during the Cubs' opening series against the Houston Astros. His first-inning homer in the season opener off Roy Oswalt was the 250th of his career. On April 18 against the St. Louis Cardinals, he hit a walk-off home run in the 11th inning.

On May 8, Ramírez dislocated his left shoulder while fielding a ground ball in a game against the Milwaukee Brewers.

==== 2010 season ====
Ramirez began the season fairly slowly, batting .168 with five home runs and 22 RBIs through his first 47 games before landing on the 15-day disabled list on June 9 with a bruised thumb. Infielder Chad Tracy was recalled from the Iowa Cubs to replace Ramirez.

Ramirez returned to the starting lineup on June 25 in Chicago against the White Sox. On defense, in 2010 he had the lowest fielding percentage among major league third baseman, at .939.

==== 2011 season ====
Ramirez activated his $14 million option on November 3, 2010 to stay with the Cubs for the 2011 season.

On June 27, 2011, Ramirez and teammate Carlos Peña homered twice in a 7–3 win over the Colorado Rockies. Ramirez and Pena both hit a two-run home run and a solo home run each.

On July 1, 2011, Ramírez hit his 300th career home run against the Chicago White Sox.

On July 10, 2011, Aramis Ramírez was asked by National League manager Bruce Bochy to replace Plácido Polanco in the All-Star Game, but Ramirez declined the invitation due to previous plans to be with his family during the break.

On October 30, 2011, Ramirez declined his portion of the $16 million option on his contract and chose to become a free agent.

On November 2, 2011, Ramirez was awarded the Louisville Slugger Silver Slugger Award for best offensive NL third baseman. In his ninth season as a Cub, Ramirez batted .306 with 35 doubles, 26 home runs and a team-high 93 RBIs. He also led the team in slugging percentage and on-base percentage.

=== Milwaukee Brewers ===
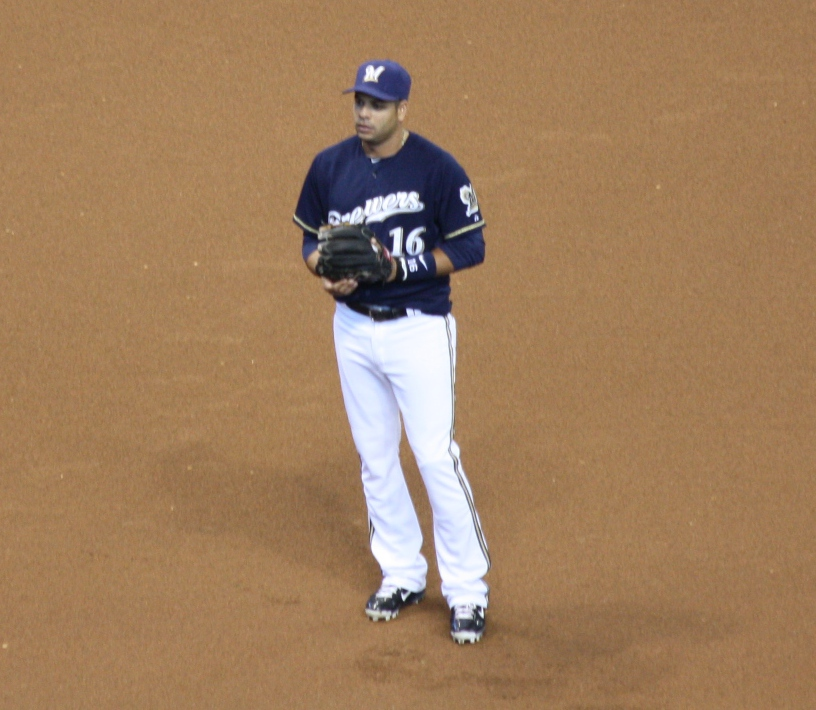
Fielding for the Milwaukee Brewers

On December 12, 2011, Ramirez signed a four-year deal worth $46 million with the Milwaukee Brewers.

==== 2012 season ====
Ramirez continued his success in Milwaukee. He had a slow start to 2012, batting as low as .218 in mid-May. However, Ramirez was able to rebound to have a very solid offensive season with the Brewers, finishing the season with a .300 batting average, with 27 home runs, 105 RBIs, as well as a league-leading 50 doubles.

Ramirez was a top-five finalist for the NL Gold Glove Award in his first season as a Brewer, dramatically improving his fielding abilities and becoming one of the best infield defenders in baseball. He also finished ninth overall in MVP voting, the highest of his career.

==== 2013 season ====
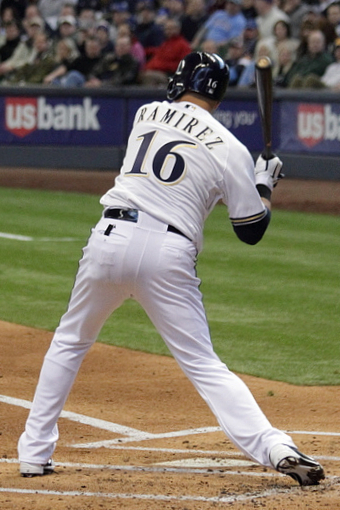
With the Brewers in 2013

Ramirez's 2013 campaign was constantly interrupted by injury. During the preseason, Ramirez sprained his left knee sliding into second base during an exhibition game at Maryvale Baseball Park in Phoenix where the Milwaukee Brewers play their spring training games. He recovered in time to play on Opening Day, but re-aggravated the injury on a similar slide into second base during the fourth game of the season and was forced to miss 30 days on the Disabled List. Ramirez returned to play in May and June, but was hampered by the knee injury causing him to lack lateral movement at 3rd base and diminished his signature power. The injury developed into patella tendinitis forcing Ramirez into another 30-day stint on the Disabled List by the end of July.

Ramírez returned from the DL, finishing the season with a .283 batting average, 12 home runs and 49 runs batted in over 92 games. This was his fewest games played in a season since 2009, when Ramirez played in only 82 games.

==== 2014 season ====
Ramirez focused on lower body workouts in the off season to prevent a re-occurrence of the knee injury from the previous season. His workouts proved successful as he was a starter for the 2014 National League All-Star Team. He alternated strong batting seasons with weak ones, but ended the season with a .285 batting average, 15 home runs, and 66 RBI over 131 games.

==== 2015 season ====
In advance of spring training, Ramirez announced that the 2015 season would likely be his last.

=== Second stint with Pirates ===
On July 23, 2015, Ramirez was traded by the Brewers back to the Pirates in exchange for minor league pitcher Yhonathan Barrios. Upon his return to the Pirates, he was unable to wear his familiar #16 as that was being currently worn by first base coach Nick Leyva, so Ramirez chose to wear #17 instead, with Pedro Florimón making the switch to #23 to accommodate Ramirez. On September 9, 2015, Ramirez played a position other than third base for the first time in his Major League career, starting at first base.

Ramírez formally announced his retirement from MLB on November 5 but added that he hoped to play one final season in the Dominican Winter League with los Tigres del Licey. He also expressed an interest in remaining involved in baseball in the future.

== Personal life ==
Ramirez has a son, Aramis Jr.

On January 12, 2024, Ramirez was inducted into the Chicago Cubs Hall of Fame with former teammate Kerry Wood. Their induction was announced at the 2024 Cubs Con.

== See also ==
- List of Major League Baseball career home run leaders
- List of Major League Baseball career total bases leaders
- List of Major League Baseball career runs scored leaders
- List of Major League Baseball career runs batted in leaders
- List of Major League Baseball career hits leaders
- List of Major League Baseball career doubles leaders
- List of Major League Baseball career extra base hits leaders
- List of Major League Baseball career hit by pitch leaders
- 2021 Baseball Hall of Fame balloting
