= David Goforth =

American baseball player (born 1988)

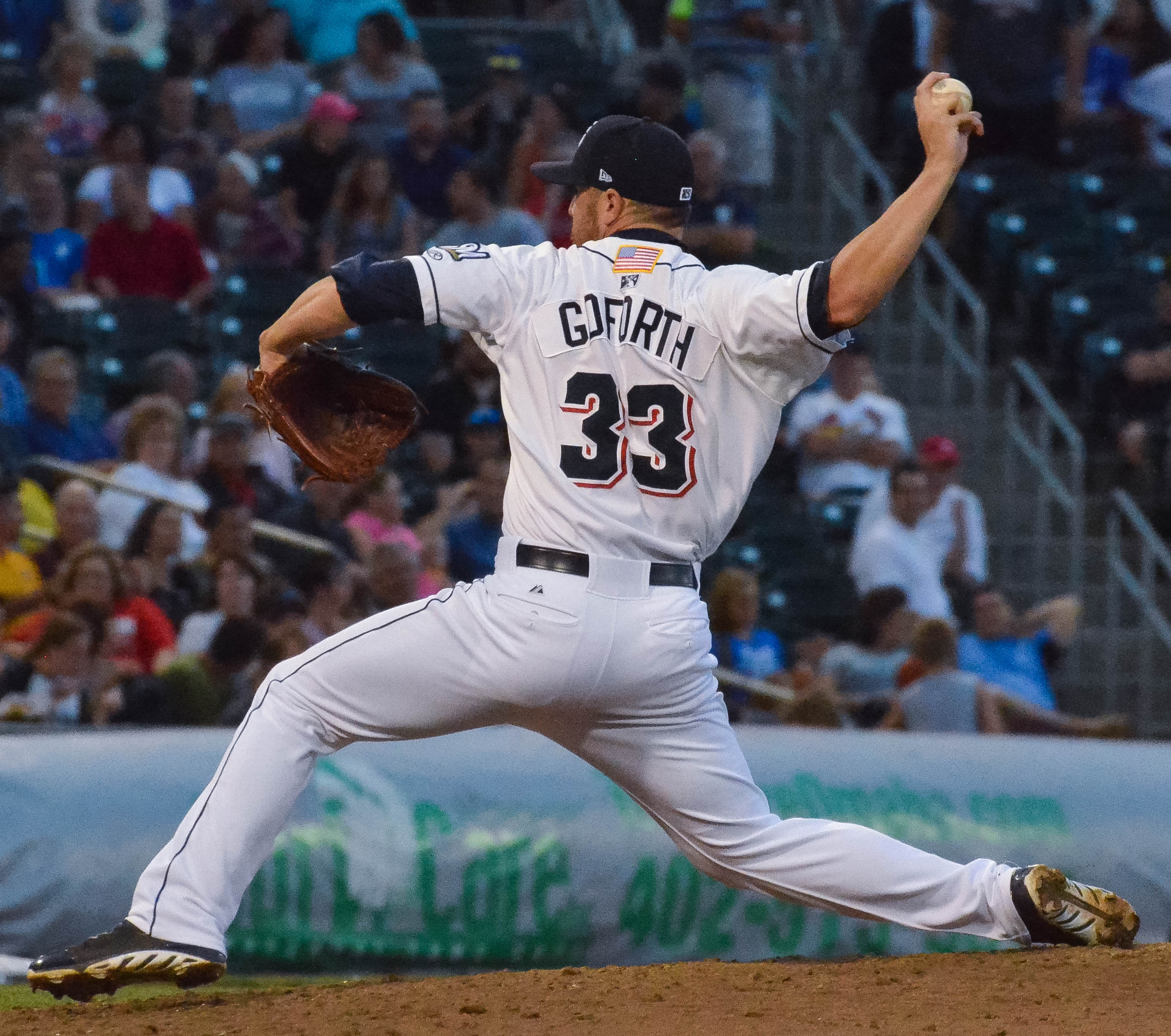
- Goforth at the 2015 Triple-A All-Star Game
- Pitcher
- Born: October 11, 1988 (age 37); Philadelphia, Mississippi, U.S.
- Batted: Right Threw: Right

MLB debut
- May 26, 2015, for the Milwaukee Brewers

Last MLB appearance
- April 9, 2017, for the Milwaukee Brewers

MLB statistics
- Win–loss record: 1–0
- Earned run average: 5.94
- Strikeouts: 33
- Stats at Baseball Reference

Teams
- Milwaukee Brewers (2015–2017)

David Paul Goforth (born October 11, 1988) is an American former professional baseball pitcher. He pitched in Major League Baseball (MLB) for the Milwaukee Brewers from 2015 through 2017.

== Career ==
=== Amateur career ===
Goforth attended Neshoba Central High School in Neshoba County, Mississippi, and the University of Mississippi (Ole Miss), and played college baseball for the Ole Miss Rebels baseball team. Goforth redshirted in his first year at Ole Miss, and spent his redshirt freshman season as a relief pitcher. After the 2009 season, he played collegiate summer baseball with the Brewster Whitecaps of the Cape Cod Baseball League. As a redshirt sophomore, Goforth began the year pitching in relief, but was moved into the starting rotation later in the year. After the season, Goforth was selected by the Cleveland Indians in the 31st round of the 2010 MLB draft. Goforth opted not to sign with Cleveland, and instead returned to Ole Miss for his redshirt junior year. Gorforth had a strong season as a starting pitcher for the Rebels as a redshirt junior.

=== Milwaukee Brewers ===
The Milwaukee Brewers selected Goforth in the seventh round of the 2011 MLB draft after the season. After the 2013 season, the Brewers assigned Goforth to play for the Surprise Saguaros of the Arizona Fall League. He participated in the Fall Stars Game.

The Brewers invited Goforth to spring training in 2014. Pitching for the Huntsville Stars of the Double–A Southern League in 2014, Goforth was named a midseason and postseason All-Star. After the season, the Brewers added Goforth to their 40-man roster to protect him from the Rule 5 draft.

Goforth began the 2015 season with the Colorado Springs Sky Sox of the Triple–A Pacific Coast League. On May 25, the Brewers promoted Goforth to the major leagues after Wily Peralta was placed on the disabled list. Goforth was designated for assignment by the Brewers on November 23, 2016. He was outrighted to the minor leagues on December 3. On April 14, 2017, Goforth was designated for assignment following the acquisition of Oliver Drake. He elected free agency on October 6.

=== Washington Nationals ===
On December 9, 2017, Goforth signed a minor league contract with the Washington Nationals. In 38 games for the Triple–A Syracuse Chiefs, he compiled a 3.46 ERA with 45 strikeouts across 67 2/3 innings pitched. Goforth elected free agency following the season on November 2, 2018.
