= Yadiel Rivera =

Puerto Rican baseball player (born 1992)

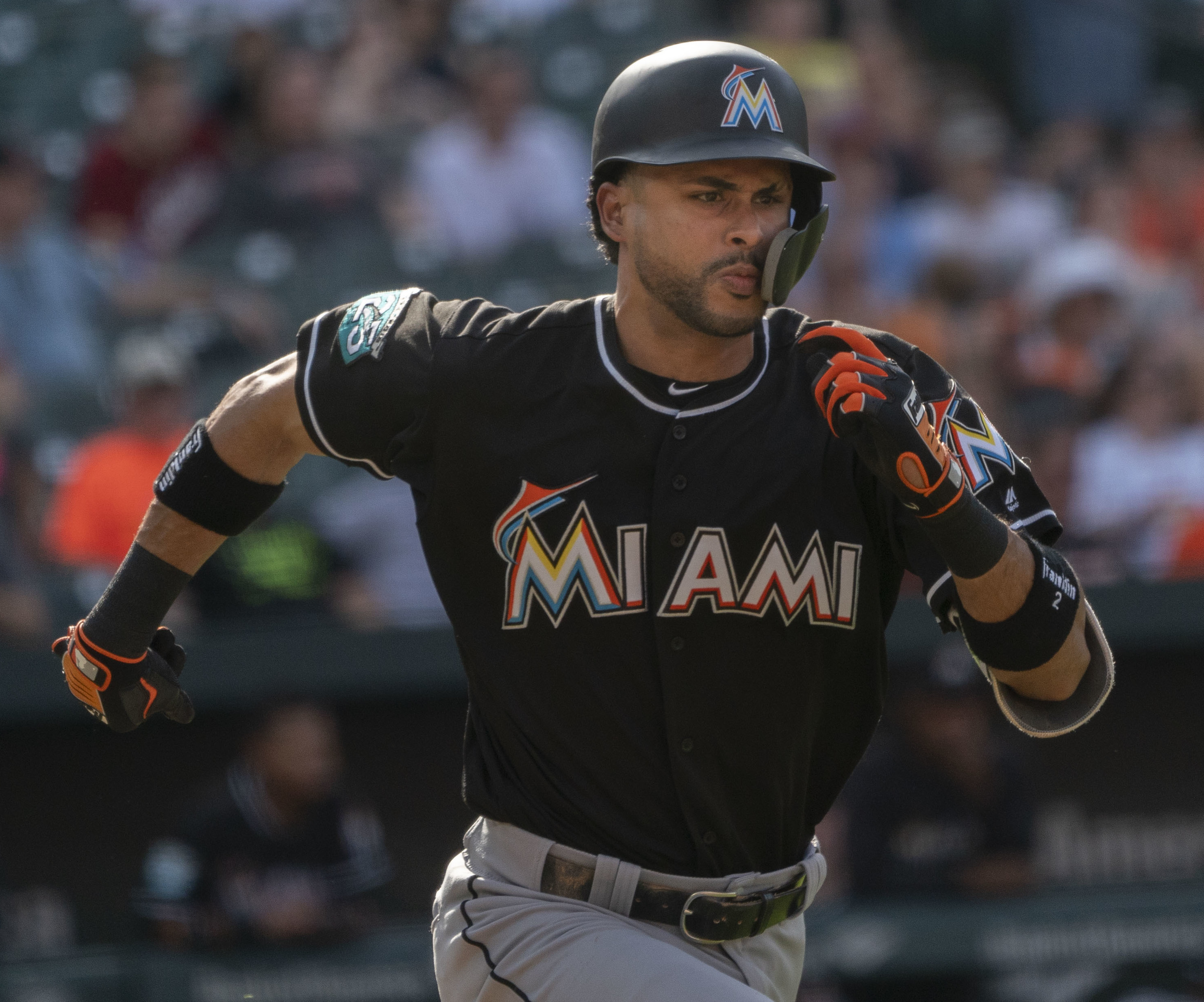
- Rivera with the Marlins in 2018
- Infielder
- Born: May 2, 1992 (age 34); Caguas, Puerto Rico
- Batted: Right Threw: Right

MLB debut
- September 22, 2015, for the Milwaukee Brewers

Last MLB appearance
- September 1, 2020, for the Texas Rangers

MLB statistics
- Batting average: .175
- Home runs: 1
- Runs batted in: 15
- Stats at Baseball Reference

Teams
- Milwaukee Brewers (2015–2017); Miami Marlins (2018–2019); Texas Rangers (2020)
Medals
Men's baseball
Representing Puerto Rico
Central American and Caribbean Games
Bronze medal – third place	2026 Santo Domingo	Team
Caribbean Cup
Bronze medal – third place	2023 Puerto Rico	Team

Yadiel Rivera (born May 2, 1992) is a Puerto Rican former professional baseball infielder. He played in Major League Baseball (MLB) for the Milwaukee Brewers, Miami Marlins, and Texas Rangers.

== Career ==
=== Milwaukee Brewers ===
Rivera was drafted by the Milwaukee Brewers in the ninth round of the 2010 Major League Baseball draft out of Manuela Toro High School in Caguas, Puerto Rico. He reached Double-A for the first time in 2014. Rivera was added to the Brewers 40-man roster on November 20, 2014.

Rivera made his Major League debut on September 22, 2015.

On September 4, 2016, Rivera was recalled to the active roster from Triple-A Colorado Springs Sky Sox to back up the injured Jonathan Villar. Rivera was designated for assignment by the Brewers on September 15, 2017. He elected free agency following the season on November 6.

=== Miami Marlins ===
On November 24, 2017, Rivera signed a minor league contract with the Miami Marlins. Rivera's contract was purchased by the Marlins on March 29, 2018 after he made the team's Opening Day roster. On July 7, Rivera hit his first career home run at Nationals Park against Washington Nationals starter Max Scherzer. He made 111 total appearances for Miami during the regular season, slashing .173/.269/.216 with one home run, nine RBI, and two stolen bases. On December 11, Rivera was removed from the 40-man roster and sent outright to Triple-A New Orleans.

Rivera was assigned to Triple-A New Orleans to start the 2019 season. On June 14, 2019, the Marlins selected Rivera's contract, adding him to their active roster. In 34 appearances for Miami, he batted .183/.258/.217 with three RBI and two stolen bases. On August 6, Rivera was designated for assignment following the promotion of Héctor Noesí. He cleared waivers and was sent outright to Triple-A Jacksonville on August 8. Rivera elected free agency on October 1.

=== Texas Rangers ===
On January 10, 2020, Rivera signed a minor league contract with the Texas Rangers that included an invitation to spring training. On August 20, Rivera was selected to the active roster. He made his season debut on August 23. On September 4, Rivera was designated for assignment after going 0-for-5 in 5 at-bats over 4 games. He became a free agent on November 2.

=== Houston Astros ===
On May 8, 2021, Rivera signed a minor league contract with the Houston Astros organization and was assigned to the Triple-A Sugar Land Skeeters. Rivera played in 19 games for the Skeeters, hitting .232/.250/.261 with 8 RBI before he was released on September 16.

=== Arizona Diamondbacks ===
On April 1, 2022, Rivera signed a minor league contract with the Arizona Diamondbacks and was assigned to the Triple-A Reno Aces. He was released on June 19.
