= Milwaukee Brewers all-time roster =

List of baseball players

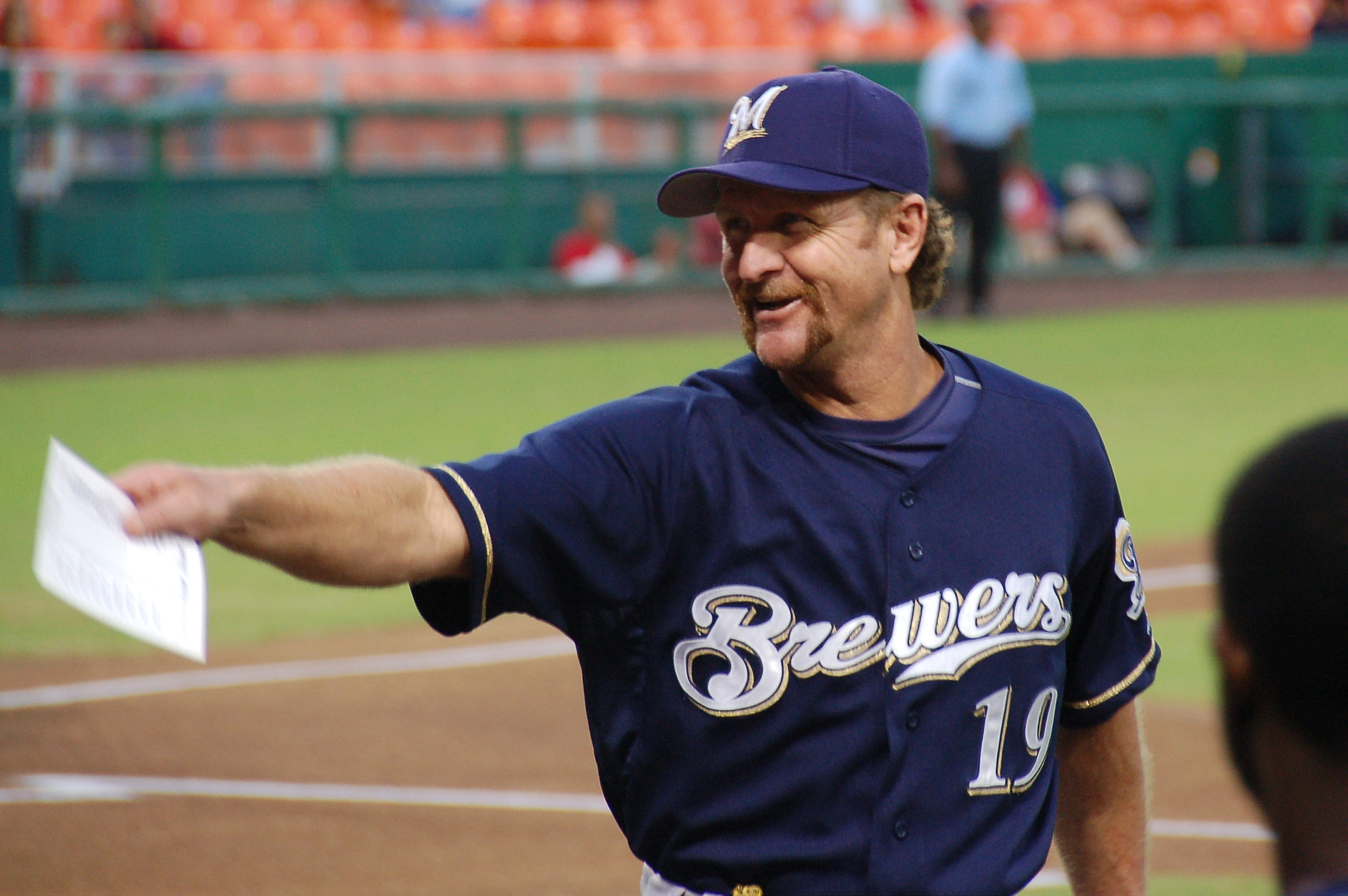
Robin Yount played in 2,856 games for the Brewers from 1974 to 1993, more than any other player in team history.

The Milwaukee Brewers are a Major League Baseball (MLB) franchise based in Milwaukee, Wisconsin. Established in Seattle, Washington, as the Seattle Pilots in 1969, the team became the Milwaukee Brewers after relocating to Milwaukee in 1970. The franchise played in the American League until 1998 when it moved to the National League in conjunction with a major league realignment. As of the completion of the 2025 season, 1,075 players have competed in at least one game for the Brewers.

== Players ==
General key
†	Inducted in the National Baseball Hall of Fame
No.	Number retired by team
Position	The player's primary fielding position

Positions key
P	Pitcher	3B	Third baseman	RF	Right fielder
C	Catcher	SS	Shortstop	OF	Outfielder
1B	First baseman	LF	Left fielder	DH	Designated hitter
2B	Second baseman	CF	Center fielder	—	

Players
Name	Season(s)	Position
Hank Aaron^{† No. 44}	1975–1976	DH
Jim Abbott	1999	P
Juan Acevedo	2000	P
Mike Adams	2004–2006	P
Joel Adamson	1997	P
Willy Adames	2021–2024	SS
Jim Adduci	1986, 1988	OF
Jesús Aguilar	2017–2019	1B
Jack Aker	1969	P
Matt Albers	2018–2019	P
Izzy Alcántara	2002	LF
Jay Aldrich	1987, 1989	P
Jason Alexander	2022	P
Tyler Alexander	2025	P
Andy Allanson	1992	C
Hank Allen	1970	OF
Erick Almonte	2011	RF
Felipe Alou	1974	OF
Max Alvis	1970	3B
Brett Anderson	2020–2021	P
Brian Anderson	2023	3B
Chase Anderson	2016–2019	P
Drew Anderson	2006	OF
Grant Anderson	2025	P
Larry Anderson	1974–1975	P
Clayton Andrews	2023	P
Nori Aoki	2012–2013	RF
Greg Aquino	2007	P
Orlando Arcia	2016–2021	SS
Aaron Ashby	2021–2022, 2024–2025	P
Alec Asher	2018	P
Nevin Ashley	2015	C
Rick Auerbach	1971–1973	SS
Don August	1988–1991	P
Jerry Augustine	1975–1984	P
Jim Austin	1991–1993	P
Rick Austin	1975–1976	P
Tyler Austin	2019	1B
Drew Avans	2025	LF
John Axford	2009–2013, 2021	P
Joe Azcue	1972	C
Burke Badenhop	2013	P
Ji-Hwan Bae	2026	OF/2B
Paul Bako	2002	C
Dave Baldwin	1970	P
Grant Balfour	2007	P
Sal Bando	1977–1981	3B
Jett Bandy	2017–2018	C
Dick Baney	1969	P
Brian Banks	1996–1999	1B
Steve Barber	1969	P
Kevin Barker	1999–2000	1B
Len Barker	1987	P
Luke Barker	2022	P
Jacob Barnes	2016–2019	P
Chris Barnwell	2006	SS
Yhonathan Barrios	2015	P
Kevin Bass	1982	OF
Billy Bates	1989–1990	2B
Dick Bates	1969	P
Jake Bauers	2024–2025	1B
Gary Beare	1976–1977	P
Larry Bearnarth	1971	P
Rich Becker	1999	CF
Andy Beene	1983–1984	P
David Bell	2006	3B
Gary Bell	1969	P
Jerry Bell	1971–1974	P
Juan Bell	1993	SS
Ronnie Belliard	1998–2002	2B
Gary Bennett	2004	C
Jeff Bennett	2004	P
Jason Bere	1999–2000	P
Dwight Bernard	1981–1982	P
Steward Berroa	2025	CF
Ken Berry	1974	OF
Quintin Berry	2017	CF
Sean Berry	1999–2000	3B
Yuniesky Betancourt	2011, 2013	1B
Alec Bettinger	2021	P
Kurt Bevacqua	1975–1976	3B
Jeff Bianchi	2012–2014	SS
Tommy Bianco	1975	3B
Dante Bichette	1991–1992	OF
Phil Bickford	2020–2021	P
Mike Birkbeck	1986–1989	P
Ray Black	2019–2020	P
Tyler Black	2024–2025	DH
Bradley Blalock	2024	P
Henry Blanco	2000–2001	C
Michael Blazek	2013, 2015–2017	P
Mike Boddicker	1993	P
Brandon Boggs	2011	LF
Dan Boitano	1979–1980	P
Bob Bolin	1970	P
Mark Bomback	1978	P
Ricky Bones	1992–1996	P
Chris Bosio	1986–1992	P
Thad Bosley	1981	OF
Ricky Bottalico	2005	P
Jason Bourgeois	2009	RF
Caleb Boushley	2023	P
Jim Bouton	1969	P
Steve Bowling	1976	OF
Brad Boxberger	2021–2022	P
Blaine Boyer	2016	P
Marshall Boze	1996	P
Gene Brabender	1969–1970	P
Zach Braddock	2010–2011	P
Jackie Bradley Jr.	2021	CF
Glenn Braggs	1986–1990	OF
Bucky Brandon	1969	P
Russell Branyan	2004–2005, 2008	3B
Ryan Braun	2007–2020	LF
Ken Brett	1972	P
Johnny Briggs	1971–1975	OF
Lewis Brinson	2017	CF
Pete Broberg	1975–1976	P
Greg Brock	1987–1991	1B
Jeff Bronkey	1994–1995	P
Mike Brosseau	2022–2023	3B
Mark Brouhard	1980–1985	OF
Kevin D. Brown	1990–1991	P
Kevin L. Brown	2000–2001	C
Ollie Brown	1972–1973	DH
Jonathan Broxton	2014–2015	P
Keon Broxton	2016–2018	CF
Bruce Brubaker	1970	P
Tom Brunansky	1993–1994	OF
George Brunet	1969	P
Jim Bruske	2000	P
Steve Brye	1977	OF
Mike Buddie	2000–2002	P
J. B. Bukauskas	2023–2024	P
Dave Burba	2003–2004	P
Bob Burda	1970	OF
Hiram Burgos	2013	P
Corbin Burnes	2018–2023	P
Jeromy Burnitz	1996–2001	RF
Mike Burns	2009	P
Ray Burris	1985, 1987	P
Terry Burrows	1996	P
Dave Bush	2006–2010	P
Matt Bush	2022–2023	P
Josh Butler	2009	P
José Cabrera	2002	P
Lorenzo Cain	2010, 2018–2022	CF
Mike Caldwell	1977–1984	P
Daz Cameron	2025	RF
Mike Cameron	2008–2009	CF
George Canale	1989–1991	1B
Robinson Cancel	1999	C
Tom Candiotti	1983–1984	P
Mark Canha	2023	OF
Mike Capel	1990	P
José Capellán	2005–2007	P
Vinny Capra	2024–2025	3B
Chris Capuano	2004–2007, 2010, 2016	P
Victor Caratini	2022–2023	C
Bernie Carbo	1976	DH
José Cardenal	1971	OF
Cris Carpenter	1996	P
Chuck Carr	1996–1997	OF
Matías Carrillo	1991	OF
Brett Carroll	2011	RF
Chris Carter	2016	1B
Raúl Casanova	2000–2002	C
Juan Castillo	1986–1989	2B
Bill Castro	1974–1980	P
Frank Catalanotto	2009	RF
Xavier Cedeño	2018	P
Juan Centeno	2015	C
Rick Cerone	1986	C
Jhoulys Chacín	2018–2019	P
Andrew Chafin	2023	P
Bill Champion	1973–1976	P
Matt Childers	2002	P
Ji-man Choi	2018	1B
Bobby Chouinard	1998	P
Jackson Chourio	2024–2025	LF
Ryan Christenson	2002	CF
Vinnie Chulk	2012	P
Mark Ciardi	1987	P
Jeff Cirillo	1994–1999, 2005–2006	P
Aaron Civale	2024–2025	P
Bobby Clark	1984–1985	OF
Brady Clark	2003–2006	CF
Matt Clark	2014	1B
Ron Clark	1969, 1972	2B
Alex Claudio	2019–2020, 2023	P
Royce Clayton	2003	SS
Mark Clear	1986–1988	P
Reggie Cleveland	1979–1981	P
Bryan Clutterbuck	1986, 1989	P
Jaime Cocanower	1983–1986	P
Todd Coffey	2008–2010	P
Jim Colborn	1972–1976	P
Lou Collier	1999–2001	LF
Isaac Collins	2024–2025	LF
Jesús Colomé	2009	P
Bob Coluccio	1973–1975	OF
Wayne Comer	1969–1970	OF
Billy Conigliaro	1972	OF
Brooks Conrad	2012	2B
Jason Conti	2003	RF
William Contreras	2023–2025	C
Mike Coolbaugh	2001	3B
Cecil Cooper	1977–1987	1B
Rocky Coppinger	1999, 2001	P
Francisco Cordero	2006–2007	P
Carlos Corporán	2009	C
Barry Cort	1977	P
Nestor Cortes	2025	P
Neal Cotts	2015	P
Craig Counsell	2004, 2007–2011	SS
Jake Cousins	2021–2023	P
Tyler Cravy	2015–2016	P
Chuck Crim	1987–1991	P
Coleman Crow	2026	P
Mike Crudale	2003	P
Enrique Cruz	2003	SS
Luis Cruz	2010	SS
Nelson Cruz	2005	RF
Will Cunnane	2001	P
Lafayette Currence	1975	P
John Curtiss	2021	P
Jeff D'Amico	1996–2001	P
Carl Dale	1999	P
Bobby Darwin	1975–1976	OF
Danny Darwin	1985–1986	P
Zach Davies	2015–2019	P
Brock Davis	1972	OF
Dick Davis	1977–1980	DH
Doug Davis	2003–2006, 2010	P
Jonathan Davis	2022	CF
Kane Davis	2000, 2005	P
Khris Davis	2013–2015	LF
Mark Davis	1997	P
Tommy Davis	1969	OF
Frankie de la Cruz	2011	P
Jorge de la Rosa	2004–2006	P
Valerio de los Santos	1998–2003	P
Rob Deer	1986–1990	OF
Mike DeJean	2001–2003	P
Chris Demaria	2006	P
Rick Dempsey	1991	C
Elmer Dessens	2007	P
Alex Diaz	1992–1994	OF
Eddy Díaz	1997	2B
Edgar Díaz	1986, 1990	SS
Rob Dibble	1995	P
Chris Dickerson	2010	LF
Mark DiFelice	2008–2009, 2011	P
Ben Diggins	2002	P
Tim Dillard	2008–2009, 2011–2012	P
Joe Dillon	2007–2008	2B
Frank DiPino	1981	P
John Donaldson	1969	2B
Josh Donaldson	2023	3B
Bill Doran	1993	2B
Al Downing	1970	P
Oliver Drake	2017–2018	P
Mauricio Dubón	2019	SS
Chris Duffy	2009	CF
Zach Duke	2014	P
Oliver Dunn	2024–2025	3B
Todd Dunn	1996–1997	LF
Caleb Durbin	2025	3B
Ray Durham	2008	2B
Jayson Durocher	2002–2003	P
Trent Durrington	2004–2005	3B
Jamie Easterly	1981–1983	P
Angel Echevarria	2000–2001	LF
Tom Edens	1990	P
Bill Edgerton	1969	P
Jim Edmonds	2010	CF
Marshall Edwards	1981–1983	OF
Cal Eldred	1991–1999	P
Rob Ellis	1971, 1974–1975	OF
Dick Ellsworth	1970–1971	P
Jake Elmore	2016	LF
Narciso Elvira	1990	P
Dave Engle	1989	1B
Matt Erickson	2004	2B
Alcides Escobar	2008–2010	SS
Eduardo Escobar	2021	3B
Paolo Espino	2017	P
Horacio Estrada	1999–2000	P
Johnny Estrada	2007	C
Marco Estrada	2010–2014	P
Leo Estrella	2003	P
Andy Etchebarren	1978	C
Dana Eveland	2005–2006	P
Jorge Fábregas	2002	C
Steve Falteisek	1999	P
Irving Falú	2014	2B
Jake Faria	2019	P
Ed Farmer	1978	P
Eric Farris	2011–2012	2B
Erick Fedde	2025	P
Mike Felder	1985–1990	OF
Mario Feliciano	2021–2022	C
Neftalí Feliz	2017	P
John Felske	1972–1973	C
Jared Fernández	2006	P
Tony Fernández	2001	3B
Mike Ferraro	1969, 1972	3B
Mike Fetters	1992–1997	P
J. P. Feyereisen	2020–2021	P
Prince Fielder	2005–2011	1B
Mike Fiers	2011–2015	P
Alfredo Fígaro	2013–2014	P
Nelson Figueroa	2002	P
Tom Filer	1988–1990	P
Derek Fisher	2021	RF
Rollie Fingers^{† No. 34}	1981–1982, 1984–1985	P
Scott Fletcher	1992	2B
John Flinn	1980	P
Ramón Flores	2016	CF
Bryce Florie	1996–1997	P
Rich Folkers	1977	P
Ben Ford	2004	P
Matt Ford	2003	P
Tony Fossas	1989–1990	P
Ray Fosse	1979	C
John Foster	2003	P
Chad Fox	1998–1999, 2001–2002	P
Juan Francisco	2013	1B
Julio Franco	1997	DH
Terry Francona	1989–1990	1B
Tito Francona	1970	1B
Nick Franklin	2017, 2018	2B
Wayne Franklin	2002–2003	P
LaVel Freeman	1989	DH
Sam Freeman	2016	P
David Freitas	2019	C
Sal Frelick	2023–2025	RF
Danny Frisella	1976	P
Miguel Fuentes	1969	P
Éric Gagné	2008	P
Bob Galasso	1979	P
Yovani Gallardo	2007–2014	P
Ben Gamel	2019–2020	LF
Mat Gamel	2008–2012	1B
Gus Gandarillas	2001	P
Jim Gantner	1976–1992	2B
Avisaíl García	2020–2021	RF
Pedro García	1973–1976	2B
Ramón García	1996	P
Rob Gardner	1973	P
Matt Garza	2014–2017	P
Robert Gasser	2024–2025	P
John Gelnar	1969–1971	P
Scooter Gennett	2013–2016	2B
Chris George	1991	P
Jody Gerut	2009–2010	CF
Bob Gibson	1983–1986	P
Gus Gil	1969–1971	3B
Brian Giles	1985	SS
Caleb Gindl	2013–2014	RF
Keith Ginter	2002–2004	3B
Brian Givens	1995–1996	P
Gary Glover	2004–2005	P
Zack Godley	2021	P
David Goforth	2015–2017	P
Carlos Gómez	2010–2015	CF
Chi Chi Gonzalez	2022	P
Héctor Gómez	2014–2015	2B
Álex González	2012–2013	1B
Geremi González	2006	P
Gio González	2018–2019	P
Mike Gonzalez	2013	P
Greg Goossen	1969–1970	1B
Tom Gorzelanny	2013–2014	P
Jim Gosger	1969	OF
Trevor Gott	2022	P
Tony Graffanino	2006–2007	2B
Yasmani Grandal	2019	C
Curtis Granderson	2018	LF
Sean Green	2011	P
Taylor Green	2011–2012	3B
Charlie Greene	1999	C
Zack Greinke	2011–2012	P
Ben Grieve	2004	RF
Justin Grimm	2020	P
Trent Grisham	2019	RF
Marquis Grissom	1998–2000	CF
Gabe Gross	2006–2008	CF
Deolis Guerra	2019	P
Javy Guerra	2023	P
Junior Guerra	2016–2019	P
Preston Guilmet	2015	P
Jandel Gustave	2021–2022	P
Tony Gwynn Jr.	2006–2008	CF
Jedd Gyorko	2020	3B
Moose Haas	1976–1985	P
Eric Haase	2024–2025	C
Josh Hader	2017–2022	P
Jerry Hairston Jr.	2011	SS
Bill Hall	2002–2009	3B
DL Hall	2024–2025	P
Sean Halton	2013	1B
Bob Hamelin	1998	1B
Darryl Hamilton	1988, 1990–1995	OF
Jeffrey Hammonds	2001–2003	RF
Donovan Hand	2013	P
Larry Haney	1969, 1977–1978	C
Jim Hannan	1971	P
Greg Hansell	1997	P
Bob Hansen	1974, 1976	DH
Blaine Hardy	2021	P
J. J. Hardy	2005–2009	SS
Pete Harnisch	1997	P
Brian Harper	1994	DH
Tommy Harper	1969–1971	2B
Lenny Harris	2002	1B
Reggie Harris	1999	P
Vic Harris	1980	OF
Corey Hart	2004–2012	1B
Donnie Hart	2019	P
Paul Hartzell	1984	P
Tom Hausman	1975–1976	P
LaTroy Hawkins	2010–2011	P
Charlie Hayes	2000	1B
Jimmy Haynes	2000–2001	P
Ryon Healy	2020	3B
Neal Heaton	1992	P
Mike Hegan	1969–1971, 1974–1977	OF
Jack Heidemann	1976–1977	DH
Bob Heise	1971–1973	2B
Rick Helling	2005–2006	P
Johnny Hellweg	2013	P
Wes Helms	2003–2005	3B
Jim Henderson	2012–2014	P
Logan Henderson	2025	P
Rod Henderson	1998	P
Ben Hendrickson	2004, 2006	P
Doug Henry	1991–1994	P
Kevin Herget	2024	P
Adrián Hernández	2004	P
Elieser Hernández	2024	P
José Hernández	2000–2002	SS
Liván Hernández	2012	P
Daniel Herrera	2011	P
Elián Herrera	2014–2015	3B
Mike Hershberger	1970	OF
Brewer Hicklen	2024	RF
Teddy Higuera	1985–1991, 1993–1994	P
Aaron Hill	2016	3B
Sam Hinds	1977	P
Larry Hisle	1978–1982	DH
Keston Hiura	2019–2022	2B
Trevor Hoffman^{†}	2009–2010	P
Fred Holdsworth	1980	P
Darren Holmes	1991–1992	P
Rhys Hoskins	2024	1B
Brock Holt	2020	2B
J. J. Hoover	2018	P
Paul Householder	1985–1986	OF
Rhys Hoskins	2025	1B
Adrian Houser	2015, 2018–2023	P
Tyler Houston	2000–2002	3B
Steve Hovley	1969–1970	OF
Wilbur Howard	1973	OF
Roy Howell	1981–1984	DH
Bryan Hudson	2024–2025	P
Joe Hudson	1998	P
Bobby Hughes	1998–1999	C
Jared Hughes	2017	P
David Hulse	1995–1996	OF
Bob Humphreys	1970	P
Jim Hunter	1991	P
Dave Huppert	1985	C
Jeff Huson	1997	2B
Mike Ignasiak	1991, 1993–1995	P
Joe Inglett	2010	RF
Hernán Iribarren	2008–2009	2B
Travis Ishikawa	2012	1B
César Izturis	2012	SS
Alex Jackson	2022	C
Darrin Jackson	1997–1998	OF
Jay Jackson	2019	P
Zach Jackson	2006, 2008	P
John Jaha	1992–1998	1B
Dion James	1983–1985	OF
Danny Jansen	2025	C
Tyler Jay	2024	P
Jeremy Jeffress	2014–2016, 2017–2019	P
Geoff Jenkins	1998–2007	LF
Dan Jennings	2018	P
Marcus Jensen	1998, 2002	C
César Jiménez	2015	P
Luis Jiménez	2015	3B
Deron Johnson	1974	DH
John Henry Johnson	1986–1987	P
Mark Johnson	2004	C
Tim Johnson	1973–1978	SS
Chris Jones	2000	RF
Doug Jones	1982, 1996–1998	P
Jahmai Jones	2023	DH
Odell Jones	1988	P
Von Joshua	1976–1977	OF
Jeff Juden	1998	P
Jorge Julio	2009	P
Taylor Jungmann	2015–2017	P
Jakob Junis	2024	P
Janson Junk	2023–2024	P
Gabe Kapler	2008	CF
Scott Karl	1995–1999	P
Rickey Keeton	1980–1981	P
Trevor Kelley	2022	P
Jason Kendall	2008–2009	C
John Kennedy	1969–1970	SS
Jim Kern	1984–1985	P
Dallas Keuchel	2024	P
Mark Kiefer	1993–1996	P
Steve Kiefer	1986–1988	3B
Brooks Kieschnick	2003–2004	P
Ray King	2000–2002, 2007	P
Matt Kinney	2003–2004	P
Brandon Kintzler	2010–2015	P
Michael Kirkman	2016	P
Ed Kirkpatrick	1977	OF
Joe Kmak	1993	C
Corey Knebel	2015–2018, 2020	P
Mark Knudson	1986–1991	P
Kevin Kobel	1973–1974, 1976	P
Pete Koegel	1970–1971	C
Jared Koenig	2024–2025	P
Brandon Kolb	2001	P
Dan Kolb	2003–2004, 2006	P
Brad Komminsk	1987	OF
Andy Kosco	1971	OF
Corey Koskie	2006	3B
Kevin Koslofski	1996	OF
Mark Kotsay	2011	RF
George Kottaras	2010–2012	C
Erik Kratz	2018	C
Lew Krausse Jr.	1970–1971	P
Ray Krawczyk	1989	P
Bill Krueger	1989–1990	P
Dave Krynzel	2004–2005	CF
Ted Kubiak	1970–1971	2B
Art Kusnyer	1976	C
Pete Ladd	1982–1985	P
Joe Lahoud	1972–1973	OF
Blake Lalli	2013	1B
Mike Lamb	2008	3B
Tom Lampkin	1993	C
Dave LaPoint	1980	P
Luis Lara	2026	OF
Eric Lauer	2020–2023	P
George Lauzerique	1970	P
Jack Lazorko	1984	P
Tim Leary	1985–1986	P
Carlos Lee	2005–2006	LF
Mark Lee	1990–1991	P
Justin Lehr	2005–2006	P
Mark Leiter	2001	P
Jeffrey Leonard	1988	OF
Randy Lerch	1981–1982	P
Curt Leskanic	2000–2001, 2003	P
Brad Lesley	1985	P
Jesse Levis	1996–1998, 2001	C
Allen Levrault	2000–2001	P
Sixto Lezcano	1974–1980	OF
Jeff Liefer	2004	1B
Adam Lind	2015	1B
Jack Lind	1974–1975	SS
Josh Lindblom	2020–2021	P
Scott Linebrink	2007	P
Frank Linzy	1972–1973	P
Pedro Liriano	2004	P
Pat Listach	1992–1996	SS
Graeme Lloyd	1993–1996	P
Bob Locker	1969–1970	P
Brandon Lockridge	2025	CF
Skip Lockwood	1969–1973	P
Kameron Loe	2010–2012	P
Boone Logan	2018	P
Kyle Lohse	2013–2015	P
Doug Loman	1984–1985	OF
Jim Lonborg	1972	P
Braden Looper	2009	P
Tim Lopes	2021	2B
Felipe López	2009, 2011	2B
Jorge López	2015, 2017–2018	P
Luis López	2000–2002	SS
Marcelino López	1971	P
Mark Loretta	1995–2002	3B
Andrew Lorraine	2002	P
Willie Lozado	1984	3B
Jonathan Lucroy	2010–2016	C
Gordon Lund	1969	SS
Jordan Lyles	2018, 2019	P
Chris Mabeus	2006	P
Julio Machado	1990–1991	P
Robert Machado	2002	C
Alex Madrid	1987	P
Damien Magnifico	2016	P
Chris Magruder	2004–2005	LF
Luke Maile	2021	C
Candy Maldonado	1991	OF
Carlos Maldonado	1993	P
Martín Maldonado	2011–2016	C
Brian Mallette	2002	P
Sean Maloney	1997	P
David Manning	2003	P
Rick Manning	1983–1987	OF
Josías Manzanillo	1993	P
Shaun Marcum	2011–2012	P
Jhan Mariñez	2016–2017	P
Mike Marshall	1969	P
Buck Martinez	1978–1980	C
Greg Martinez	1998	OF
Luis Martínez	2003	P
Tommy Matchick	1971	3B
Mike Matheny	1994–1998	C
Mark Mathias	2020, 2022	RF
Mike Matthews	2002	P
Dave May	1970–1974, 1978	OF
Derrick May	1995	OF
Matt Maysey	1993	P
Edwin Maysonet	2012	SS
Jamie McAndrew	1995, 1997	P
Mike McClendon	2010–2012	P
Seth McClung	2007–2009	P
Bob McClure	1977–1986	P
Andrew McCutchen	2022	DH
Ben McDonald	1996–1997	P
Easton McGee	2025	P
Jake McGee	2022	P
Casey McGehee	2009–2011	P
Tim McIntosh	1990–1993	C
Billy McKinney	2021	LF
Ken McMullen	1977	DH
Jerry McNertney	1969–1970	C
Nick Mears	2024–2025	P
Doc Medich	1982	P
James Meeker	2024	P
Trevor Megill	2023–2025	P
J. C. Mejía	2022–2023	P
Kevin Mench	2006–2007	LF
José Mercedes	1994–1998	P
Bob Meyer	1969–1970	P
Joey Meyer	1988–1989	DH
Will Middlebrooks	2016	3B
Matt Mieske	1993–1997	OF
Wade Miley	2018, 2023–2024	P
Brad Miller	2018	2B
Damian Miller	2005–2007	C
Owen Miller	2023–2024	1B
Roger Miller	1974	P
Shelby Miller	2025	P
Tyson Miller	2023	P
Hoby Milner	2021–2024	P
Tommy Milone	2017	P
Don Mincher	1969	1B
Paul Mirabella	1987–1990	P
Ángel Miranda	1993–1997	P
Jacob Misiorowski	2025-2026	P
Mike Misuraca	1997	P
Bobby Mitchell	1971, 1973–1975	OF
Garrett Mitchell	2022–2025	CF
Paul Mitchell	1979–1980	P
Sergio Mitre	2011	P
Chad Moeller	2004–2006	C
Paul Molitor^{† No. 4}	1978–1992	3B
Andruw Monasterio	2023–2025	3B
Don Money	1973–1983	3B
Frankie Montas	2024	P
Charlie Moore	1973–1986	C
Donnie Moore	1981	P
Nyjer Morgan	2011–2012	CF
John Morris	1969–1971	P
Logan Morrison	2020	1B
Julio Mosquera	2005	C
Guillermo Mota	2008	P
Curt Motton	1972	OF
Mike Moustakas	2018–2019	3B
James Mouton	2000–2001	CF
Lyle Mouton	1999–2000	LF
Willie Mueller	1978–1981	P
Greg Mullins	1998	P
Tom Murphy	1974–1976	P
Tony Muser	1978	1B
Mike Myers	1998–1999	P
Tobias Myers	2024–2025	P
Shane Nance	2002–2003	P
Omar Narváez	2020–2022	C
Chris Narveson	2009–2013	P
Jaime Navarro	1989–1994, 2000	P
Brad Nelson	2008–2009	1B
Jimmy Nelson	2013–2017, 2019	P
Nick Neugebauer	2001–2002	P
Marc Newfield	1996–1998	OF
Ray Newman	1972–1973	P
Kirk Nieuwenhuis	2016–2017	CF
Juan Nieves	1986–1988	P
Wil Nieves	2011	C
Dave Nilsson	1992–1999	C
Laynce Nix	2006–2008	LF
Hideo Nomo	1999	P
Takahito Nomura	2002	P
Tim Nordbrook	1978–1979	SS
Daniel Norris	2021	P
Jacob Nottingham	2018–2021	C
Rafael Novoa	1993	P
Edwin Núñez	1991–1992	P
Charlie O'Brien	1987–1990	C
Syd O'Brien	1972	3B
John O'Donoghue	1969–1970	P
Troy O'Leary	1993–1994	LF
Wes Obermueller	2003–2005	P
Alex Ochoa	1999, 2002	RF
Ben Oglivie	1978–1986	OF
Tomo Ohka	2005–2006	P
Jim Olander	1991	OF
Joe Oliver	1995	C
Nate Orf	2018	2B
Jesse Orosco	1992–1994	P
Joey Ortiz	2024–2025	SS
Pat Osburn	1975	P
Keith Osik	2003	C
Jimmy Osting	2002	P
Lyle Overbay	2004–2005, 2014	1B
Eric Owens	1998	LF
Ray Oyler	1969	SS
Jim Paciorek	1987	1B
Jim Pagliaroni	1969	C
Matt Pagnozzi	2014	C
Lance Painter	2001	P
Thomas Pannone	2023	P
Enoli Paredes	2024	P
Dave Parker	1990	DH
Gerardo Parra	2014–2015	LF
Manny Parra	2007–2010, 2012	P
Bill Parsons	1971–1973	P
Bronswell Patrick	1998	P
Chad Patrick	2025	P
Corey Patterson	2009	LF
Marty Pattin	1969–1971	P
Joel Payamps	2023–2025	P
Elvis Peguero	2023–2025	P
Dave Pember	2002	P
Ariel Peña	2015–2016	P
Elvis Peña	2001	2B
Roberto Peña	1970–1971	1B
Freddy Peralta	2018–2025	P
Wily Peralta	2012–2017	P
Ángel Perdomo	2020–2021	P
Luis Perdomo	2022	P
Danny Perez	1996	OF
Eddie Pérez	2003	C
Hernán Pérez	2015–2019	2B
Juan Pérez	2012	P
Robert Pérez	2001	RF
Santiago Pérez	2000	SS
Blake Perkins	2023–2025	CF
Jeff Peterek	1989	P
Ray Peters	1970	P
Jace Peterson	2020–2022	3B
Kyle Peterson	1999, 2001	P
Shane Peterson	2015	LF
Jake Petricka	2019	P
David Phelps	2020	P
Tommy Phelps	2005	P
Travis Phelps	2004	P
Brett Phillips	2017–2018	CF
Rob Picciolo	1982–1983	SS
Manny Piña	2016–2021	C
Josmil Pinto	2016	C
Jim Pittsley	1999	P
Dan Plesac	1986–1992	P
Eric Plunk	1998–1999	P
Scott Podsednik	2003–2004	CF
John Poff	1980	DH
Gus Polidor	1989–1990	3B
Drew Pomeranz	2019	P
Carlos Ponce	1985	1B
Chuck Porter	1981–1985	P
Darrell Porter	1971–1976	C
Mike Potts	1996	P
Dennis Powell	1990	P
Cooper Pratt	2026	SS
Alex Presley	2016	RF
Quinn Priester	2025	P
Josh Prince	2013	OF
Bill Pulsipher	1998–1999	P
Rubén Quevedo	2001–2003	P
José Quintana	2025	P
Jamie Quirk	1977	DH
Aramis Ramírez	2012–2015	3B
Héctor Ramírez	1999–2000	P
Neil Ramírez	2016	P
Willie Randolph	1991	2B
Merritt Ranew	1969	C
Cody Ransom	2012	3B
Drew Rasmussen	2020–2021	P
Paul Ratliff	1971–1972	C
Lance Rautzhan	1979	P
Corey Ray	2021	RF
Colin Rea	2021, 2023–2024	P
Randy Ready	1983–1986	3B
Jeremy Reed	2011	LF
Jody Reed	1994	2B
Michael Reed	2015–2016	CF
Kevin Reimer	1993	DH
Hunter Renfroe	2022	RF
Luis Rengifo	2026	2B
Andy Replogle	1978–1979	P
Jerry Reuss	1989	P
Al Reyes	1995–1999	P
Pablo Reyes	2021–2022	3B
Archie Reynolds	1972	P
Bob Reynolds	1971	P
Ken Reynolds	1973	P
Mark Reynolds	2014	1B
Tommie Reynolds	1972	OF
Trevor Richards	2021	P
Paul Rigdon	2000–2001	P
Ron Rightnowar	1995	P
Ernest Riles	1985–1988	SS
David Riske	2008–2010	P
Todd Ritchie	2003	P
Mike Rivera	2006–2009, 2011	C
Yadiel Rivera	2015–2017	3B
Sid Roberson	1995	P
Daniel Robertson	2021	3B
Billy Jo Robidoux	1985–1988	1B
Ron Robinson	1990–1992	P
Carlos Rodríguez	2024–2025	P
Eduardo Rodríguez	1973–1978	P
Ellie Rodríguez	1971–1973	C
Elvin Rodríguez	2025	P
Francisco Rodríguez	2011–2013, 2014–2015	P
Jason Rogers	2014–2015	1B
Mark Rogers	2010, 2012	P
Taylor Rogers	2022	P
Garry Roggenburk	1969	P
Rich Rollins	1969–1970	3B
Chris Roller	2024	CF
Sal Romano	2021	P
Ed Romero	1977, 1980–1985, 1989	2B
Phil Roof	1970–1971	C
Rafael Roque	1998–2000	P
Jimmy Rosario	1976	OF
Joe Ross	2024	P
Vinny Rottino	2006–2008	C
Ben Rowen	2016	P
Darin Ruf	2023	DH
Bruce Ruffin	1992	P
Esteury Ruiz	2022	LF
Glendon Rusch	2002–2003	P
Jim Rushford	2002	RF
Gary Ryerson	1972–1973	P
CC Sabathia^{†}	2008	P
Ray Sadecki	1976	P
Connor Sadzeck	2022	P
Chris Sáenz	2004	P
Takashi Saito	2011	P
Lenn Sakata	1977–1979	2B
Tyler Saladino	2018–2019	SS
Ángel Salomé	2008	C
Alex Sánchez	2001–2003	CF
Gary Sánchez	2024	DH
Miguel Sánchez	2021–2022	P
Ken Sanders	1970–1972	P
Carlos Santana	2023	1B
Domingo Santana	2015–2018	RF
Julio Santana	2005	P
Víctor Santos	2004–2005	P
Luis Sardiñas	2015	SS
Dennis Sarfate	2006	P
Ted Savage	1970–1971	OF
Rob Scahill	2016–2017	P
Bob Scanlan	1994–1995, 2000	P
Logan Schafer	2011–2015	CF
Ducky Schofield	1971	SS
Jonathan Schoop	2018	2B
Bill Schroeder	1983–1988	C
George Scott	1972–1976	1B
Ray Searage	1984–1986	P
Bob Sebra	1990	P
Diego Seguí	1969	P
Jean Segura	2012–2015	SS
Anthony Seigler	2025	3B
Kevin Seitzer	1992, 1993–1996	3B
Dick Selma	1974	P
Pedro Severino	2022	C
Richie Sexson	2000–2003	1B
Bill Sharp	1975–1976	OF
Travis Shaw	2017–2019, 2021	3B
Ben Sheets	2001–2008	P
Gary Sheffield	1988–1991	SS
Bob Sheldon	1974–1975, 1977	2B
Chris Short	1973	P
Brian Shouse	2006–2008	P
Ted Simmons^{†}	1981–1985	C
Allan Simpson	2006	P
Dick Simpson	1969	OF
Duane Singleton	1994–1995	OF
Jon Singleton	2023	1B
Bob Skube	1982–1983	OF
Jim Slaton	1971–1977, 1979–1983	P
Joe Slusarski	1995	P
Ethan Small	2022–2023	P
Bernie Smith	1970–1971	OF
Burch Smith	2019	P
Chris Smith	2009–2010	P
Mark Smith	2003	LF
Travis Smith	1998	P
Will Smith	2014–2016	P
Justin Smoak	2020	1B
John Snyder	2000	P
Russ Snyder	1970	OF
Eric Sogard	2017–2018, 2020	2B
Lary Sorensen	1977–1980	P
Joakim Soria	2018	P
Bennett Sousa	2023	P
Cory Spangenberg	2019	3B
Steve Sparks	1995–1996	P
Bill Spiers	1989–1994	SS
Junior Spivey	2004–2005	2B
Ed Sprague Sr.	1973–1976	P
Chris Spurling	2006–2007	P
Matt Stairs	2002	RF
Steve Stanicek	1987	DH
Fred Stanley	1969–1970	SS
Dave Stapleton	1987–1988	P
Randy Stein	1978	P
Earl Stephenson	1972	P
Jerry Stephenson	1969	P
Adam Stern	2010	LF
Mitch Stetter	2007–2011	P
Kelly Stinnett	1996–1997	C
Josh Stinson	2012	P
Mel Stocker	2007	LF
Hunter Strickland	2021	P
Peter Strzelecki	2022–2023	P
Franklin Stubbs	1991–1992	1B
Everett Stull	2000, 2002	P
William Suero	1992–1993	3B
Jim Sundberg	1984	C
Jeff Suppan	2007–2010	P
B. J. Surhoff	1987–1995	C
Andrew Susac	2016–2017	C
Brent Suter	2016–2022	P
Gary Sutherland	1976	2B
Don Sutton^{†}	1982–1984	P
Mac Suzuki	2001	P
Dale Sveum	1986–1991	SS
Anthony Swarzak	2017	P
Mark Sweeney	2000–2001	LF
R. J. Swindle	2009	P
Fred Talbot	1969	P
Raimel Tapia	2023	RF
Jim Tatum	1992	3B
Julián Tavárez	2008	P
Chuck Taylor	1972	P
Tyrone Taylor	2019–2023	RF
Julio Teherán	2023	P
Rowdy Tellez	2021–2023	1B
Tom Tellmann	1983–1984	P
Frank Tepedino	1971	1B
Eric Thames	2017–2019	1B
Ron Theobald	1971–1972	2B
Connor Thomas	2025	P
Dan Thomas	1976–1977	OF
Gorman Thomas	1973–1976, 1978–1983, 1986	DH
Mike Thomas	1995	P
Ryan Thompson	2002	LF
Dickie Thon	1993	SS
Tyler Thornburg	2012–2016	P
Gary Timberlake	1969	P
Justin Topa	2020–2021	P
Abraham Toro	2023	3B
Yorvit Torrealba	2012	C
Carlos Torres	2016–2017	P
Salomón Torres	2008	P
Bill Travers	1974–1980	P
Brice Turang	2023–2025	2B
Derrick Turnbow	2005–2008	P
Wayne Twitchell	1970	P
Tim Unroe	1995–1997	1B
Jose Urena	2022	P
Luis Urías	2020–2023	3B
Abner Uribe	2023–2025	P
Sandy Valdespino	1969–1970	OF
José Valentín	1992–1999	SS
Dave Valle	1994	C
Tim Van Egmond	1996	P
John Vander Wal	2003	RF
Claudio Vargas	2007, 2009–2010	P
Gus Varland	2023	P
Andrew Vaughn	2025	1B
Greg Vaughn	1989–1996	LF
Carlos Velázquez	1973	P
Freddie Velázquez	1969	C
José Veras	2012	P
Randy Veres	1989–1990	P
José Vidal	1969	OF
Thyago Vieira	2023–2024	P
Carlos Villanueva	2006–2010	P
Jonathan Villar	2016–2018	2B
Ron Villone	1996–1997	P
Fernando Viña	1995–1999	2B
Luis Vizcaíno	2002–2004	P
Daniel Vogelbach	2020–2021	1B
Stephen Vogt	2017	C
Jack Voigt	1997	LF
Luke Voit	2023	1B
Bill Voss	1971–1972	OF
Pete Vuckovich	1981–1986	P
John Vukovich	1973–1974	3B
Paul Wagner	1997–1998	P
Tyler Wagner	2015	P
Bobby Wahl	2020	P
Rick Waits	1983–1985	P
Neil Walker	2017	2B
Colin Walsh	2016	3B
Danny Walton	1969–1971	OF
Wei-Chung Wang	2014, 2017	P
Turner Ward	1994–1996	OF
David Weathers	1998–2001, 2009	P
Floyd Weaver	1971	P
Tyler Webb	2017	P
Ryan Weber	2021	P
Rickie Weeks Jr.	2003, 2005–2014	2B
Bill Wegman	1985–1995	P
Patrick Weigel	2021	P
Steve Whitaker	1969	P
Devon White	2001	CF
Mitch White	2024	P
Kevin Wickander	1995–1996	P
Floyd Wicker	1970–1971	OF
Bob Wickman	1996–2000	P
Joey Wiemer	2023–2024	CF
Aaron Wilkerson	2017–2019	P
Andy Wilkins	2016	P
Billy Williams	1969	OF
Devin Williams	2019–2024	P
Gerald Williams	1996–1997	CF
Matt Williams	2000	P
Taylor Williams	2017–2019	P
Antone Williamson	1997	1B
Alex Wilson	2019	P
Bryse Wilson	2023–2024	P
Josh Wilson	2011	SS
Joe Winkelsas	2006	P
Jesse Winker	2023	DH
Matt Wise	2004–2007	P
Jim Wohlford	1977–1979	OF
Randy Wolf	2010–2012	P
Dooley Womack	1969	P
Kolten Wong	2021–2022	2B
Brad Woodall	1998	P
Steve Woodard	1997–2000	P
Jake Woodford	2026	P
Brandon Woodruff	2017–2023, 2025	P
Rob Wooten	2013–2015	P
Clyde Wright	1974	P
Jamey Wright	2000–2002	P
Rick Wrona	1994	C
Jimmy Wynn	1977	DH
Eric Yardley	2020–2021	P
Al Yates	1971	OF
Christian Yelich	2018–2025	LF
Craig Yoho	2025	P
Ned Yost	1980–1983	C
Eric Young Sr.	2002–2003	2B
Mike Young	1988	OF
Robin Yount^{† No. 19}	1974–1993	SS
Jeff Yurak	1978	OF
Mike Zagurski	2018	P
Rob Zastryzny	2024–2025	P
Gregg Zaun	2010	C
Bruce Zimmermann	2025	P
Jordan Zimmermann	2021	P
Pete Zoccolillo	2003	RF
Eddie Zosky	1999	SS
