= 2002 Milwaukee Brewers season =

2002 Milwaukee Brewers
- League: National League
- Division: Central
- Ballpark: Miller Park
- City: Milwaukee, Wisconsin, United States
- Record: 56–106 (.346)
- Divisional place: 6th
- Owners: Bud Selig
- General managers: Dean Taylor
- Managers: Davey Lopes, Jerry Royster
- Television: WCGV-TV; WISN-TV; FSN Wisconsin (Daron Sutton, Bill Schroeder)
- Radio: WTMJ (AM) (Bob Uecker, Jim Powell)

The 2002 Milwaukee Brewers season was the 33rd season for the Brewers in Milwaukee, their 5th in the National League, and their 34th overall. The Brewers finished sixth in the National League Central with a record of 56 wins and 106 losses, their only 100 loss season to date. Davey Lopes was fired after the team started 3–12. The Brewers also hosted the All-Star Game on July 9.

== Offseason ==
- January 21, 2002: Alex Ochoa was traded as part of a 3-team trade by the Colorado Rockies to the Milwaukee Brewers. The New York Mets sent Lenny Harris and Glendon Rusch to the Milwaukee Brewers. The New York Mets sent Benny Agbayani, Todd Zeile, and cash to the Colorado Rockies. The Colorado Rockies sent Craig House and Ross Gload to the New York Mets. The Milwaukee Brewers sent Jeff D'Amico, Jeromy Burnitz, Lou Collier, Mark Sweeney, and cash to the New York Mets.
- February 8, 2002: Midre Cummings was signed as a free agent with the Milwaukee Brewers.

== Regular season ==
On May 23, 2002, Shawn Green of the Los Angeles Dodgers hit four home runs in one game versus the Brewers. He also had one single and one double for a total of 19 total bases. The number broke the previous record of 18 total bases set 48 seasons prior by Joe Adcock of the Milwaukee Braves versus the Brooklyn Dodgers at Ebbets Field on July 31, 1954.

=== Season standings ===
==== National League Central ====
NL Central
Team	W	L	Pct.	GB	Home	Road
St. Louis Cardinals	97	65	.599	—	52‍–‍29	45‍–‍36
Houston Astros	84	78	.519	13	47‍–‍34	37‍–‍44
Cincinnati Reds	78	84	.481	19	38‍–‍43	40‍–‍41
Pittsburgh Pirates	72	89	.447	24½	38‍–‍42	34‍–‍47
Chicago Cubs	67	95	.414	30	36‍–‍45	31‍–‍50
Milwaukee Brewers	56	106	.346	41	31‍–‍50	25‍–‍56

==== Record vs. opponents ====
2002 National League record Source: MLB Standings Grid – 2002
Team	AZ	ATL	CHC	CIN	COL	FLA	HOU	LAD	MIL	MON	NYM	PHI	PIT	SD	SF	STL	AL
Arizona	—	3–3	4–2	6–0	14–5	5–1	3–3	9–10	4–2	4–2	5–2	4–3	4–2	12–7	8–11	2–4	11–7
Atlanta	3–3	—	4–2	4–2	4–3	11–8	3–3	2–4	5–1	13–6	12–7	11–7	3–3	3–3	3–3–1	5–1	15–3
Chicago	2–4	2–4	—	5–12	4–2	4–2	8–11	2–4	7–10	3–3	1–5	2–4	10–9	2–4	3–3	6–12	6–6
Cincinnati	0–6	2–4	12–5	—	3–3	5–1	6–11	4–2	13–6	1–5	2–4	2–4	11–7	5–1	2–4	8–11	2–10
Colorado	5–14	3–4	2–4	3–3	—	5–2	3–3	7–12	3–3	4–2	3–3	3–3	4–2	11–8	8–12	2–4	7–11
Florida	1–5	8–11	2–4	1–5	2–5	—	3–3	3–3	4–2	10–9	8–11	10–9	4–2	5–1	4–3	4–2	10–8
Houston	3–3	3–3	11–8	11–6	3–3	3–3	—	3–3	10–8	3–3	4–2	3–3	11–6	4–2	1–5	6–13	5–7
Los Angeles	10–9	4–2	4–2	2–4	12–7	3–3	3–3	—	5–1	5–2	4–2	4–3	4–2	10–9	8–11	2–4	12–6
Milwaukee	2–4	1–5	10–7	6–13	3–3	2–4	8–10	1–5	—	2–4	1–5	1–5	4–15	5–1	1–5	7–10	2–10
Montreal	2–4	6–13	3–3	5–1	2–4	9–10	3–3	2–5	4–2	—	11–8	11–8	3–3	3–4	4–2	3–3	12–6
New York	2–5	7–12	5–1	4–2	3–3	11–8	2–4	2–4	5–1	8–11	—	9–10	1–4	3–4	0–6	3–3	10–8
Philadelphia	3–4	7–11	4–2	4–2	3–3	9–10	3–3	3–4	5–1	8–11	10–9	—	2–4	2–4	3–3	4–2	10–8
Pittsburgh	2–4	3–3	9–10	7–11	2–4	2–4	6–11	2–4	15–4	3–3	4–1	4–2	—	2–4	2–4	6–11	3–9
San Diego	7–12	3–3	4–2	1–5	8–11	1–5	2–4	9–10	1–5	4–3	4–3	4–2	4–2	—	5–14	1–5	8–10
San Francisco	11–8	3–3–1	3–3	4–2	11–8	3–4	5–1	11–8	5–1	2–4	6–0	3–3	4–2	14–5	—	2–4	8–10
St. Louis	4–2	1–5	12–6	11–8	4–2	2–4	13–6	4–2	10–7	3–3	3–3	2–4	11–6	5–1	4–2	—	8–4

=== All-Star Game ===
The 2002 Major League Baseball All-Star Game was the 73rd playing of the midsummer classic between the all-stars of the American League (AL) and National League (NL). The game was held on July 9, 2002 at Miller Park in Milwaukee, Wisconsin. The game resulted in a 7-7 tie. The next year home field advantage in the World Series would be awarded to the winning league. The game is commonly referred to as a 'flop' by sports writers due to the lack of continuation of the game.

The roster selection for the 2002 game marked the inaugural All-Star Final Vote competition (then known as "The All-Star 30th Man" competition). Johnny Damon and Andruw Jones represented the American and National Leagues as a result of this contest.

=== Notable transactions ===
- April 5, 2002: Marco Scutaro was selected off waivers by the New York Mets from the Milwaukee Brewers.
- June 4, 2002: Prince Fielder was drafted by the Milwaukee Brewers in the 1st round (7th pick) of the 2002 amateur draft. Player signed June 17, 2002.
- June 4, 2002: Hunter Pence was drafted by the Milwaukee Brewers in the 40th round of the 2002 amateur draft, but did not sign.
- July 31, 2002: Alex Ochoa was traded by the Milwaukee Brewers with Sal Fasano to the Anaheim Angels for players to be named later and Jorge Fábregas. The Anaheim Angels sent Johnny Raburn (minors) (August 14, 2002) and Pedro Liriano (September 20, 2002) to the Milwaukee Brewers to complete the trade.

=== Roster ===
2002 Milwaukee Brewers
Roster
Pitchers: 47 Mike Buddie; 49 José Cabrera; 43 Matt Childers; 28 Valerio de los Santos; 48 Mike DeJean; 81 Ben Diggins; 56 Jayson Durocher; 52 Nelson Figueroa; 40 Chad Fox; 26 Wayne Franklin; 46 Ray King; 23 Andrew Lorraine; 59 Brian Mallette; 30 Mike Matthews; 47 Shane Nance; 32 Nick Neugebauer; 95 Takahito Nomura; 30 Jimmy Osting; 13 Dave Pember; 37 Rubén Quevedo; 39 Glendon Rusch; 15 Ben Sheets; 50 Everett Stull; 51 Luis Vizcaíno; 21 Jamey Wright	Catchers: 9 Paul Bako; 25 Raul Casanova; 6 Jorge Fábregas; 26 Marcus Jensen; 72 Robert Machado; Infielders: 10 Ronnie Belliard; 1 Keith Ginter; 2 Bill Hall; 16 Lenny Harris; 18 José Hernández; 2 Tyler Houston; 1 Luis López; 8 Mark Loretta; 11 Richie Sexson; 7 Eric Young	Outfielders: 55 Izzy Alcántara; 27 Ryan Christenson; 41 Jeffrey Hammonds; 5 Geoff Jenkins; 23 Alex Ochoa; 33 Jim Rushford; 22 Alex Sánchez; 12 Matt Stairs; 38 Ryan Thompson	Manager: 30 Davey Lopes; 3 Jerry Royster; Coaches: 45 Gary Allenson (Third Base); 35 Bill Castro (Bullpen); 29 Dave Collins (First Base); 36 Gary Matthews (Hitting); 3 Jerry Royster (Bench); 43 Dave Stewart (Pitching); -- Cecil Cooper (Bench)

== Player stats ==
= Indicates team leader

=== Batting ===
==== Starters by position ====
Note: Pos = Position; G = Games played; AB = At bats; H = Hits; Avg. = Batting average; HR = Home runs; RBI = Runs batted in

Pos	Player	G	AB	H	Avg.	HR	RBI
C	Paul Bako	87	234	55	.235	4	20
1B	Richie Sexson	157	570	159	.279	29	102
2B	Eric Young Sr.	138	496	139	.280	3	28
SS	José Hernández	152	525	151	.288	24	73
3B	Tyler Houston	76	255	77	.302	7	33
LF	Geoff Jenkins	67	243	59	.243	10	29
CF	Alex Sánchez	112	394	114	.289	1	33
RF	Jeffrey Hammonds	128	448	115	.257	9	41

==== Other batters ====
Note: G = Games played; AB = At bats; H = Hits; Avg. = Batting average; HR = Home runs; RBI = Runs batted in

Player	G	AB	H	Avg.	HR	RBI
Ronnie Belliard	104	289	61	.211	3	26
Matt Stairs	107	270	66	.244	16	41
Mark Loretta	86	217	58	.267	2	19
Alex Ochoa	85	215	55	.256	6	21
Lenny Harris	122	197	60	.305	3	17
Robert Machado	51	153	39	.255	2	17
Ryan Thompson	62	137	34	.248	8	24
Raúl Casanova	31	87	16	.184	1	8
Jim Rushford	23	77	11	.143	1	6
Keith Ginter	21	76	18	.237	1	8
Jorge Fábregas	30	67	11	.164	3	14
Ryan Christenson	22	58	9	.155	1	3
Bill Hall	19	36	7	.194	1	5
Marcus Jensen	16	35	4	.114	1	4
Izzy Alcántara	16	32	8	.250	2	5
Luis López	6	8	0	.000	0	1

=== Pitching ===
==== Starting pitchers ====
Note: G = Games pitched; IP = Innings pitched; W = Wins; L = Losses; ERA = Earned run average; SO = Strikeouts

Player	G	IP	W	L	ERA	SO
Ben Sheets	34	216.2	11	16	4.15	170
Glendon Rusch	34	210.2	10	16	4.70	140
Rubén Quevedo	26	139.0	6	11	5.76	93
Jamey Wright	19	114.1	5	13	5.35	69
Nick Neugebauer	12	55.1	1	7	4.72	47
Wayne Franklin	4	24.0	2	1	2.63	17
Ben Diggins	5	24.0	0	4	8.63	15
Jimmy Osting	3	12.0	0	2	7.50	7
Everett Stull	2	10.0	0	1	6.30	7

==== Other pitchers ====
Note: G = Games pitched; IP = Innings pitched; W = Wins; L = Losses; ERA = Earned run average; SO = Strikeouts

Player	G	IP	W	L	ERA	SO
José Cabrera	50	103.1	6	10	6.79	61
Nelson Figueroa	30	93.0	1	7	5.03	51
Andrew Lorraine	5	12.0	0	1	11.25	10
Dave Pember	4	8.2	0	1	5.19	5

==== Relief pitchers ====
Note: G = Games pitched; W = Wins; L = Losses; SV = Saves; ERA = Earned run average; SO = Strikeouts

Player	G	W	L	SV	ERA	SO
Mike DeJean	68	1	5	27	3.12	65
Luis Vizcaíno	76	5	3	5	2.99	79
Ray King	76	3	2	0	3.05	50
Valerio De Los Santos	51	2	3	0	3.12	38
Jayson Durocher	39	1	1	0	1.88	44
Mike Buddie	25	1	2	0	4.54	28
Takahito Nomura	21	0	0	0	8.56	9
Matt Childers	8	0	0	0	12.00	6
Brian Mallette	5	0	0	0	10.80	5
Shane Nance	4	0	0	0	4.26	5
Mike Matthews	4	0	0	0	4.50	2
Chad Fox	3	1	0	0	5.79	3

== Awards and honors ==
All-Star Game

- 1B Richie Sexson, All-Star Game Selection
- SS Jose Hernandez, All-Star Game Selection

== Farm system ==
The Brewers' farm system consisted of eight minor league affiliates in 2002. The Brewers operated a Venezuelan Summer League team as a co-op with the Boston Red Sox.

Level	Team	League	Manager
Triple-A	Indianapolis Indians	International League	Ed Romero
Double-A	Huntsville Stars	Southern League	Frank Kremblas
Class A-Advanced	High Desert Mavericks	California League	Mike Caldwell
Class A	Beloit Snappers	Midwest League	Don Money
Rookie	Ogden Raptors	Pioneer League	Tim Blackwell
Rookie	AZL Brewers	Arizona League	Carlos Lezcano
Rookie	DSL Brewers	Dominican Summer League	—
Rookie	VSL Ciudad Alianza	Venezuelan Summer League	—
