= 2002 Chicago Cubs season =

2002 Chicago Cubs
- League: National League
- Division: Central
- Ballpark: Wrigley Field
- City: Chicago
- Record: 67–95 (.414)
- Divisional place: 5th
- Owners: Tribune Company
- General managers: Andy MacPhail, Jim Hendry
- Managers: Don Baylor, Rene Lachemann, Bruce Kimm
- Television: WGN-TV/Superstation WGN (Chip Caray, Joe Carter); FSN Chicago (Chip Caray, Dave Otto)
- Radio: WGN (Pat Hughes, Ron Santo)
- Stats: ESPN.com; Baseball Reference

The 2002 Chicago Cubs season was the 131st season of the Chicago Cubs franchise, the 127th in the National League and the 87th at Wrigley Field. The Cubs finished fifth in the National League Central with a record of 67–95.

== Offseason ==
- November 2, 2001: Mark Bellhorn was traded by the Oakland Athletics to the Chicago Cubs for Adam Morrissey (minors).
- January 16, 2002: Alan Benes was signed as a free agent with the Chicago Cubs.
- March 27, 2002: Dontrelle Willis was traded by the Chicago Cubs with Jose Cueto (minors), Ryan Jorgensen, and Julián Tavárez to the Florida Marlins for Antonio Alfonseca and Matt Clement.

== Regular season ==
=== Season standings ===
==== National League Central ====
NL Central
Team	W	L	Pct.	GB	Home	Road
St. Louis Cardinals	97	65	.599	—	52‍–‍29	45‍–‍36
Houston Astros	84	78	.519	13	47‍–‍34	37‍–‍44
Cincinnati Reds	78	84	.481	19	38‍–‍43	40‍–‍41
Pittsburgh Pirates	72	89	.447	24½	38‍–‍42	34‍–‍47
Chicago Cubs	67	95	.414	30	36‍–‍45	31‍–‍50
Milwaukee Brewers	56	106	.346	41	31‍–‍50	25‍–‍56

==== Record vs. opponents ====
2002 National League record Source: MLB Standings Grid – 2002
Team	AZ	ATL	CHC	CIN	COL	FLA	HOU	LAD	MIL	MON	NYM	PHI	PIT	SD	SF	STL	AL
Arizona	—	3–3	4–2	6–0	14–5	5–1	3–3	9–10	4–2	4–2	5–2	4–3	4–2	12–7	8–11	2–4	11–7
Atlanta	3–3	—	4–2	4–2	4–3	11–8	3–3	2–4	5–1	13–6	12–7	11–7	3–3	3–3	3–3–1	5–1	15–3
Chicago	2–4	2–4	—	5–12	4–2	4–2	8–11	2–4	7–10	3–3	1–5	2–4	10–9	2–4	3–3	6–12	6–6
Cincinnati	0–6	2–4	12–5	—	3–3	5–1	6–11	4–2	13–6	1–5	2–4	2–4	11–7	5–1	2–4	8–11	2–10
Colorado	5–14	3–4	2–4	3–3	—	5–2	3–3	7–12	3–3	4–2	3–3	3–3	4–2	11–8	8–12	2–4	7–11
Florida	1–5	8–11	2–4	1–5	2–5	—	3–3	3–3	4–2	10–9	8–11	10–9	4–2	5–1	4–3	4–2	10–8
Houston	3–3	3–3	11–8	11–6	3–3	3–3	—	3–3	10–8	3–3	4–2	3–3	11–6	4–2	1–5	6–13	5–7
Los Angeles	10–9	4–2	4–2	2–4	12–7	3–3	3–3	—	5–1	5–2	4–2	4–3	4–2	10–9	8–11	2–4	12–6
Milwaukee	2–4	1–5	10–7	6–13	3–3	2–4	8–10	1–5	—	2–4	1–5	1–5	4–15	5–1	1–5	7–10	2–10
Montreal	2–4	6–13	3–3	5–1	2–4	9–10	3–3	2–5	4–2	—	11–8	11–8	3–3	3–4	4–2	3–3	12–6
New York	2–5	7–12	5–1	4–2	3–3	11–8	2–4	2–4	5–1	8–11	—	9–10	1–4	3–4	0–6	3–3	10–8
Philadelphia	3–4	7–11	4–2	4–2	3–3	9–10	3–3	3–4	5–1	8–11	10–9	—	2–4	2–4	3–3	4–2	10–8
Pittsburgh	2–4	3–3	9–10	7–11	2–4	2–4	6–11	2–4	15–4	3–3	4–1	4–2	—	2–4	2–4	6–11	3–9
San Diego	7–12	3–3	4–2	1–5	8–11	1–5	2–4	9–10	1–5	4–3	4–3	4–2	4–2	—	5–14	1–5	8–10
San Francisco	11–8	3–3–1	3–3	4–2	11–8	3–4	5–1	11–8	5–1	2–4	6–0	3–3	4–2	14–5	—	2–4	8–10
St. Louis	4–2	1–5	12–6	11–8	4–2	2–4	13–6	4–2	10–7	3–3	3–3	2–4	11–6	5–1	4–2	—	8–4

=== Notable transactions ===
- September 4, 2002: Bill Mueller was traded by the Chicago Cubs with cash to the San Francisco Giants for Jeff Verplancke (minors).

=== Roster ===
2002 Chicago Cubs
Roster
Pitchers: 57 Antonio Alfonseca; 53 Francis Beltrán; 35 Alan Benes; 46 Jason Bere; 48 Joe Borowski; 37 Scott Chiasson; 30 Matt Clement; 51 Juan Cruz; 49 Will Cunnane; 55 Courtney Duncan; 44 Kyle Farnsworth; 13 Jeff Fassero; 45 Tom Gordon; 32 Jon Lieber; 54 Ron Mahay; 52 Pat Mahomes; 31 Donovan Osborne; 22 Mark Prior; 41 Jesus Sánchez; 39 Steve Smyth; 34 Kerry Wood; 38 Carlos Zambrano	Catchers: 27 Joe Girardi; 9 Todd Hundley; 72 Robert Machado; 58 Mike Mahoney; Infielders: 28 Mark Bellhorn; 19 Hee-Seop Choi; 8 Alex Gonzalez; 17 Bobby Hill; 29 Fred McGriff; 33 Bill Mueller; 1 Augie Ojeda; 15 Kevin Orie; 11 Chris Stynes	Outfielders: 18 Moisés Alou; 24 Roosevelt Brown; 16 Delino DeShields; 12 Angel Echevarria; 15 Mario Encarnación; 3 Chad Hermansen; 6 Darren Lewis; 20 Corey Patterson; 21 Sammy Sosa	Manager: 25 Don Baylor; 10 Bruce Kimm; Coaches: 2 Sandy Alomar Sr. (first base); 43 Dave Bialas (third base); 3 Gene Glynn (former third base); 36 Rick Kranitz (bullpen); 5 Rene Lachemann (bench); 4 Jeff Pentland (hitting); 47 Larry Rothschild (pitching)

== Player stats ==
=== Batting ===
==== Starters by position ====
Note: Pos = Position; G = Games played; AB = At bats; H = Hits; Avg. = Batting average; HR = Home runs; RBI = Runs batted in

Pos	Player	G	AB	H	Avg.	HR	RBI
C	Joe Girardi	90	234	53	.226	1	13
1B	Fred McGriff	146	523	143	.273	30	103
2B	Mark Bellhorn	146	445	115	.258	27	56
SS	Alex Gonzalez	142	513	127	.248	18	61
3B	Bill Mueller	103	353	94	.266	7	37
LF	Moisés Alou	132	484	133	.275	15	61
CF	Corey Patterson	153	592	150	.253	14	54
RF	Sammy Sosa	150	556	160	.288	49	108

==== Other batters ====
Note: G = Games played; AB = At bats; H = Hits; Avg. = Batting average; HR = Home runs; RBI = Runs batted in

Player	G	AB	H	Avg.	HR	RBI
Todd Hundley	92	266	56	.211	16	35
Roosevelt Brown	111	204	43	.211	3	23
Chris Stynes	98	195	47	.241	5	26
Bobby Hill	59	190	48	.253	4	20
Delino DeShields	67	146	28	.192	3	10
Angel Echevarria	50	98	30	.306	3	21
Darren Lewis	58	79	19	.241	0	7
Augie Ojeda	30	70	13	.186	0	4
Robert Machado	22	58	16	.276	1	5
Hee-Seop Choi	24	50	9	.180	2	4
Chad Hermansen	35	43	9	.209	1	3
Kevin Orie	13	32	9	.281	0	5
Mike Mahoney	16	29	6	.207	0	3
Mario Encarnación	3	7	0	.000	0	0

=== Pitching ===
==== Starting pitchers ====
Note: G = Games pitched; IP = Innings pitched; W = Wins; L = Losses; ERA = Earned run average; SO = Strikeouts

Player	G	IP	W	L	ERA	SO
Kerry Wood	33	213.2	12	11	3.66	217
Matt Clement	32	205.0	12	11	3.60	215
Jon Lieber	21	141.0	6	8	3.70	87
Mark Prior	19	116.2	6	6	3.32	147
Jason Bere	16	85.2	1	10	5.67	65
Alan Benes	7	39.1	2	2	4.35	32
Steve Smyth	8	26.0	1	3	9.35	16

==== Other pitchers ====
Note: G = Games pitched; IP = Innings pitched; W = Wins; L = Losses; ERA = Earned run average; SO = Strikeouts

Player	G	IP	W	L	ERA	SO
Carlos Zambrano	32	108.1	4	8	3.66	93
Juan Cruz	45	97.1	3	11	3.98	81
Pat Mahomes	16	32.2	1	1	3.86	23

==== Relief pitchers ====
Note: G = Games pitched; W = Wins; L = Losses; SV = Saves; ERA = Earned run average; SO = Strikeouts

Player	G	W	L	SV	ERA	SO
Antonio Alfonseca	66	2	5	19	4.00	61
Joe Borowski	73	4	4	2	2.73	97
Jeff Fassero	57	5	6	0	6.18	44
Kyle Farnsworth	45	4	6	1	7.33	46
Tom Gordon	19	1	1	0	3.42	31
Will Cunnane	16	1	1	0	5.47	30
Donovan Osborne	11	0	1	0	6.19	13
Ron Mahay	11	2	0	0	8.59	14
Francis Beltrán	11	0	0	0	7.50	11
Jesús Sánchez	8	0	0	0	12.96	6
Scott Chiasson	4	0	0	0	23.14	3
Courtney Duncan	2	0	0	0	0.00	1

== Farm system ==
Level	Team	League	Manager
AAA	Iowa Cubs	Pacific Coast League	Bruce Kimm and Pat Listach
AA	West Tenn Diamond Jaxx	Southern League	Bobby Dickerson
A	Daytona Cubs	Florida State League	Dave Trembley
A	Lansing Lugnuts	Midwest League	Julio Garcia
A-Short Season	Boise Hawks	Northwest League	Steve McFarland
Rookie	AZL Cubs	Arizona League	Carmelo Martínez

LEAGUE CHAMPIONS: Boise, AZL Cubs
