= Ben Diggins =

American baseball player (born 1979)

- Pitcher
- Born: June 13, 1979 (age 47); Leoti, Kansas, U.S.
- Batted: Right Threw: Right

MLB debut
- September 2, 2002, for the Milwaukee Brewers

Last MLB appearance
- September 26, 2002, for the Milwaukee Brewers

MLB statistics
- Win–loss record: 0–4
- Earned run average: 8.62
- Strikeouts: 15
- Stats at Baseball Reference

Teams
- Milwaukee Brewers (2002)

Benjamin Howard Diggins (born June 13, 1979) is an American former professional baseball pitcher. He played in Major League Baseball (MLB) for the Milwaukee Brewers.

== Amateur career ==
Diggins was drafted by the St. Louis Cardinals in the first round of the 1998 Major League Baseball draft, but did not sign. He was later drafted by the Los Angeles Dodgers in the first round of the 2000 Major League Baseball draft and signed on August 23, 2000. He attended the University of Arizona where he was a Baseball America Freshman All-American in 1999 and a consensus All-American as a sophomore in 2000. As a starting pitcher Diggins was 10–4 with a 3.83 ERA and 127 strikeouts. He also hit for the Wildcats, batting .340 with 9 home runs and 41 RBIs. He played for the U.S.A National Baseball team the summer of 1999, where he led the team in saves (3) and ERA (2.05)

== Professional career ==
=== Los Angeles Dodgers ===
Diggins began his professional career with the Class-A Wilmington Waves of the South Atlantic League in 2001. He went 7–6 with a 3.58 ERA and 79 strikeouts in 21 games, all starts.

In 2002 Diggins began the season with the Class-A Advanced Vero Beach Dodgers. He went 6–10 with a 3.63 ERA in 20 games, 19 starts.

=== Milwaukee Brewers ===
On July 23, 2002 Diggins was traded by the Dodgers along with Shane Nance to the Milwaukee Brewers for Tyler Houston and a player to be named later, who eventually was Brian Mallette. He finished the season with the Double-A Huntsville Stars of the Southern League where he went 2–1 with a 1.91 ERA in seven games, all starts. Between the two organizations, Diggins went a combined 8–11 with a 3.20 ERA and 135 strikeouts in 1512/3 innings pitched. Diggins was promoted to the Major Leagues and made his debut on September 2, 2002, against the Chicago Cubs. He started the game but only pitched 11/3, giving up eight runs, seven earned. In five games, all starts, Diggins went 0–4 with an 8.62 ERA in 24 innings pitched.

In 2003 Diggins began the season with the Double-A Huntsville Stars going 3–2 with a 2.36 ERA, all starts, before tearing the UCL ligament in his elbow. He had season-ending Tommy John surgery in August 2003.

=== Houston Astros ===
On December 8, 2005 Diggins was selected by the Houston Astros in the Rule 5 Draft but never made an appearance in their organization.

=== Windy City Thunderbolts ===
After being released by the Houston Astros, Diggins signed with the Independent Windy City Thunderbolts of the Frontier League as a first baseman. His transition soon led to his retirement. After just 17 games Diggins batted .209 with one home run and 9 RBIs.

== See also ==
- Rule 5 draft results
