= Gregg Zaun =

American baseball player (born 1971)

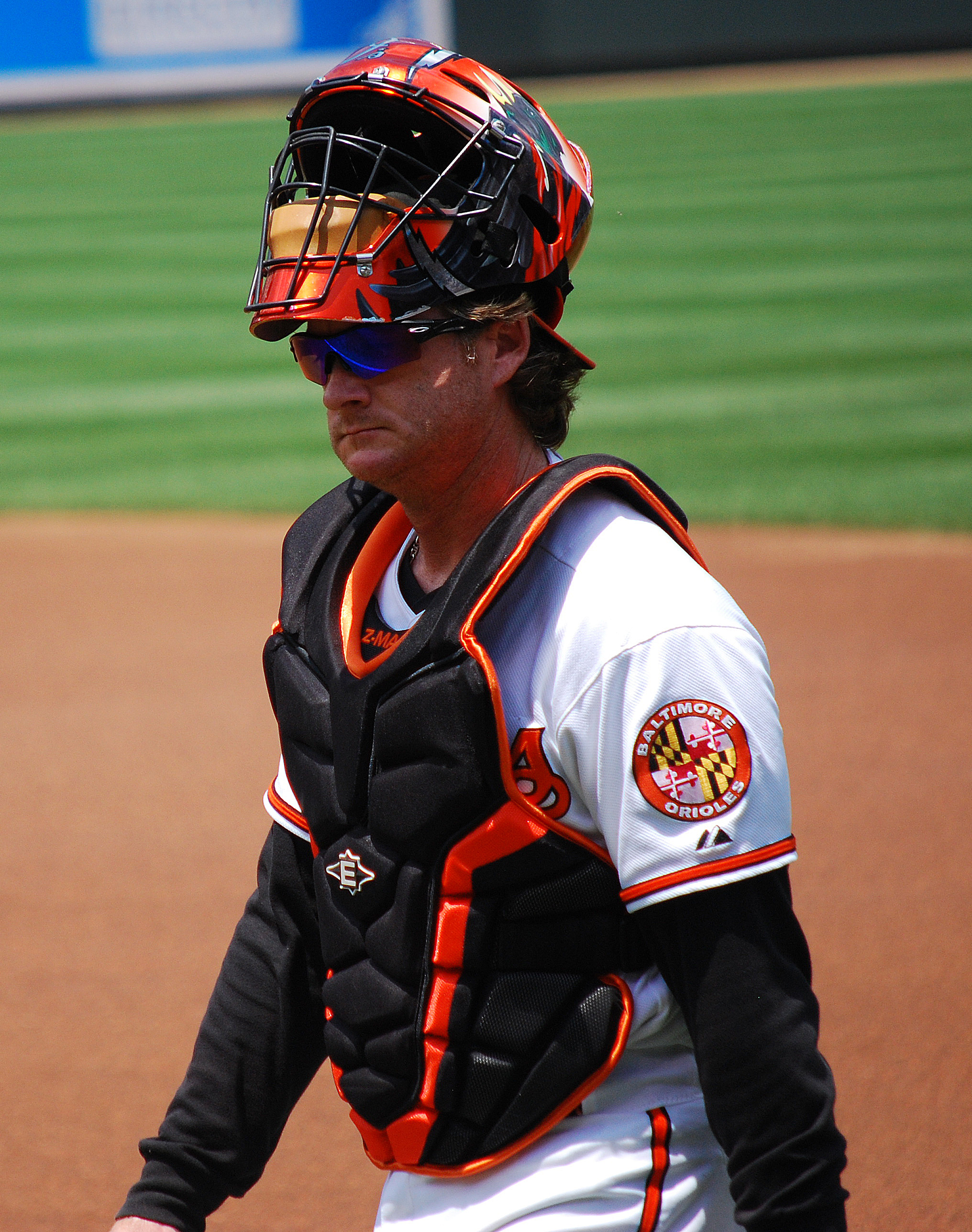
- Zaun with the Baltimore Orioles in 2009
- Catcher
- Born: April 14, 1971 (age 55); Glendale, California, U.S.
- Batted: Switch Threw: Right

MLB debut
- June 24, 1995, for the Baltimore Orioles

Last MLB appearance
- May 20, 2010, for the Milwaukee Brewers

MLB statistics
- Batting average: .252
- Home runs: 88
- Runs batted in: 446
- Stats at Baseball Reference

Teams
- Baltimore Orioles (1995–1996); Florida Marlins (1996–1998); Texas Rangers (1999); Kansas City Royals (2000–2001); Houston Astros (2002–2003); Colorado Rockies (2003); Toronto Blue Jays (2004–2008); Baltimore Orioles (2009); Tampa Bay Rays (2009); Milwaukee Brewers (2010)

Career highlights and awards
- World Series champion (1997)
Medals
Men's baseball
Representing United States
World Junior Baseball Championship
Gold medal – first place	1989 Trois-Rivières	Team

Gregory Owen Zaun (/ˈzɔːn/; born April 14, 1971) is an American baseball analyst, public speaker and a former professional baseball catcher. He played for nine teams over 16 seasons in Major League Baseball (MLB) from 1995 until 2010, winning a World Series Championship in 1997. From 2006 to 2017, he served as an on-air personality with Sportsnet in Canada.

== Playing career ==
=== Early life ===
Zaun was born in Glendale, California. The nephew of former MLB catcher Rick Dempsey, Zaun was a high school teammate of Mark Loretta. Zaun and Loretta attended Saint Francis High School in La Cañada, California, and graduated in 1989. Zaun was recruited to play college baseball at USC, UCLA, Loyola Marymount and Oklahoma, but signed a letter of intent to play for Texas. However, he chose not to play for Texas upon learning that they had signed a junior college All-American catcher. Zaun also played for the United States national baseball team at the 1989 World Junior Baseball Championship in Canada.

=== Professional career ===
Drafted by the Baltimore Orioles in the 17th round of the 1989 Major League Baseball draft, Zaun reached the majors with the Orioles in June 1995. He was used primarily as a back-up early in his career. He batted .231 with one home run and 13 runs batted in (RBI) in 39 games with the Orioles in 1996 before being optioned on August 6 to the Rochester Red Wings where he hit .319 in 14 games. He was sent to the Florida Marlins on August 23 to complete a transaction from two days prior on August 21 when Terry Mathews was acquired by the Orioles. After winning a World Series with the Marlins in 1997, he became their starting catcher to finish out the 1998 season when Charles Johnson and then Mike Piazza were traded. He then moved to the Texas Rangers prior to the 1999 season. He has also played with the Kansas City Royals, Houston Astros, and Colorado Rockies. He signed as a free agent with the Blue Jays prior to the 2004 season. Valuable in the line-up as a switch-hitter, he set a career high in 2005 with 133 games.

==== 2006–2011 ====
Prior to the 2006 season, the Blue Jays signed Bengie Molina as the everyday catcher, making Zaun the backup. Zaun started 2006 on the injured list, with Jason Phillips serving as Molina's backup during the first week of the year. Zaun hit a game-winning two-run homer off the Tampa Bay Devil Rays' Jason Childers in his return on April 8. Molina's struggles against right-handed pitchers caused John Gibbons to platoon the two, with Molina generally starting against left-handed pitchers and Zaun playing against righties. On September 13, 2006, he hit home runs from both sides of the plate in the same game. He was only the fourth Blue Jay in history to do this.

Because the Blue Jays actively pursued Rod Barajas of the Texas Rangers as the club's new starting catcher during the 2006 offseason, it was assumed that Zaun would be exploring free agency as signing Barajas would mean Zaun would be maintained as a backup. Meanwhile, negotiations between Zaun and the club deteriorated, as Zaun claimed that the Jays offered "slightly better than back-up money for playing every day". Negotiations with Barajas went as far as an offer conditional on a routine physical, but eventually fell apart for undisclosed reasons. After turning down a reported $6.5 million two-year offer from the Blue Jays a week earlier, Zaun officially accepted a two-year, $7.25 million contract offer to return to the Blue Jays as their starting catcher on November 28, 2006. The new contract deal also included a third-year option, guaranteed based on appearances. The signing came after Zaun was rumored to have been courted by the Boston Red Sox and New York Yankees, both in backup roles.

Arguably his most famous play with the Jays was hitting a game-winning grand slam in the bottom of the 13th inning off of Tampa Bay Rays closer Troy Percival, on September 6, 2008, with two outs in the inning, wiping out the Rays, 7–4. Zaun hit only the second game-winning grand slam in Jays history but it was the first that occurred in extra innings, and even more spectacular was that his team was losing at the time, due to an RBI single by Dioner Navarro to put the Rays up, 4–3, before the slam at the top of the 13th.

On January 22, 2009, Zaun signed a one-year deal with the Baltimore Orioles.

Zaun was claimed off waivers by the Tampa Bay Rays GM Andrew Friedman in exchange for Rhyne Hughes on August 7, 2009. On August 16, Zaun hit a pinch hit grand slam home run against his old team, the Blue Jays, in the eighth inning off Brandon League on a 3–2 fastball. On November 12, 2009, Zaun was granted free agency.

On December 4, 2009, Zaun signed a one-year contract with the Milwaukee Brewers for $1.9 million. After suffering a severe injury, Zaun's 2010 season—and, as it turned out, his MLB career, ended on May 20. After the season, Milwaukee declined his contract option, and he became a free agent on November 2.

In January, Zaun signed a minor league deal with the San Diego Padres, with an invitation to spring training. However, noting that he still had not recovered from his previous injury enough to play regularly, he chose to retire on March 7, 2011.

=== Mitchell Report ===
In 2007, Zaun was included in the Mitchell Report following a 20-month investigation into the use of performance-enhancing drugs by former Senator George Mitchell. In the report, Kirk Radomski claimed he sold Deca-Durabolin and Winstrol to Zaun in 2001, after a referral from Jason Grimsley. Radomski produced a cheque from Zaun for $500. Mitchell also explained that former Montreal Expos bullpen catcher Luis Perez claimed to have supplied Zaun with steroids in 2002. Zaun declined to be interviewed for the report.

On February 15, 2008, Zaun responded in detail to the allegations made in the report after issuing a denial as soon as it came out. Zaun vehemently denied taking performance-enhancing drugs, stating that he owed Grimsley $500 and that Grimsley re-wrote the cheque to purchase drugs for himself. Zaun explained, "I can say, with 100% certainty, that the cheque was not to buy performance-enhancing drugs. It's obvious to me what parts of the cheque are my writing".

== Post-playing career ==
=== Broadcasting career ===
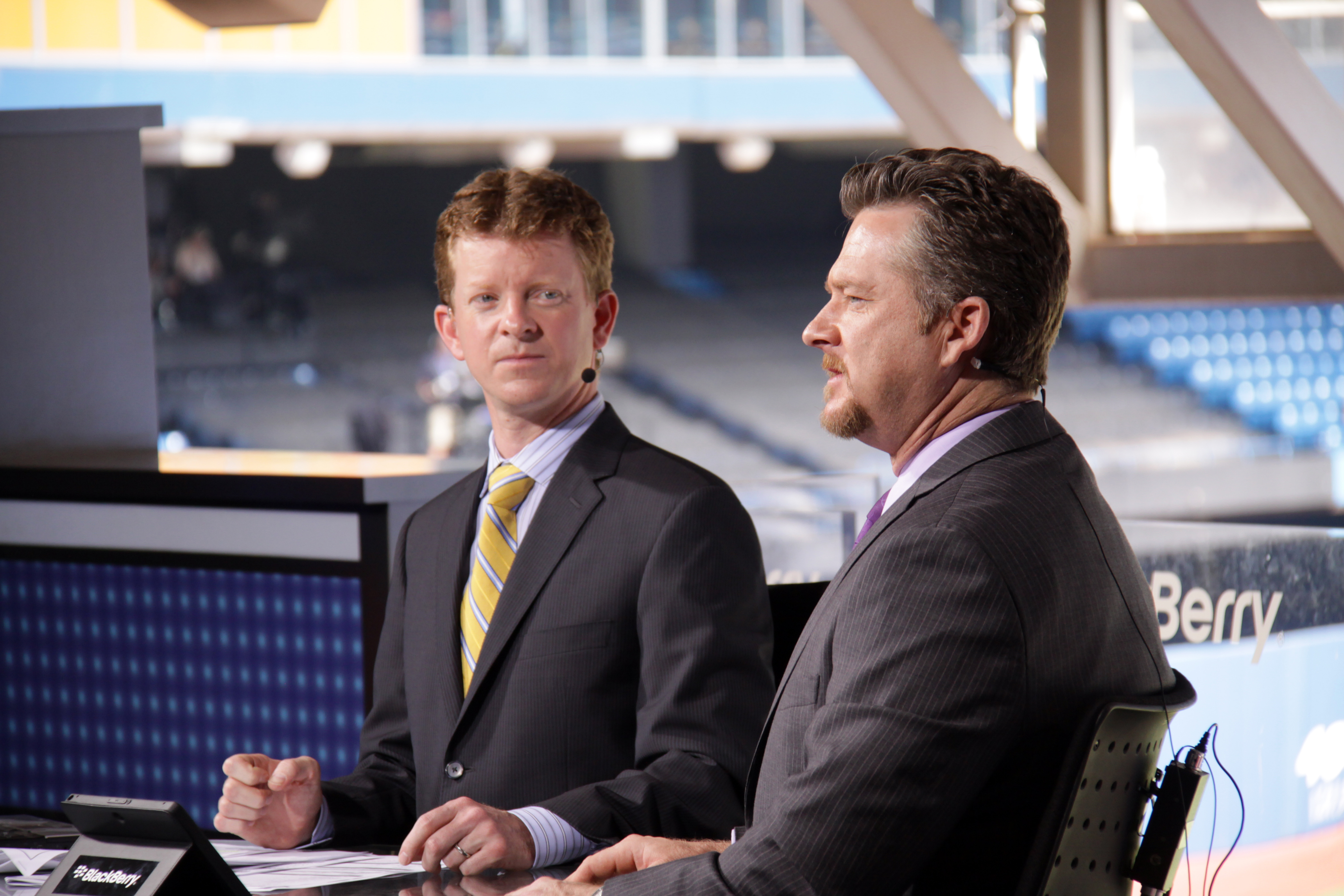
Zaun (right) with fellow announcer Jamie Campbell in 2011.

Zaun started his broadcasting career after the Blue Jays closed out their 2006 season. Throughout the playoffs, Zaun would offer his thoughts on how the teams and players were doing, and how he thought they could improve.

After his retirement, on March 14, 2011, Zaun signed a two-year contract with Rogers Sportsnet to become their studio MLB analyst. He also served as a part-time analyst on Sportsnet Radio Fan 590 and the Blue Jays Radio Network. As part of his duties he blogged on his website 'zauntourage.com' (now defunct).

On May 10–11, 2011 Zaun filled in as the color commentator on the NESN broadcast of a Red Sox series against the Blue Jays when the normal broadcaster, Jerry Remy, was ill.

==== Firing ====
On November 30, 2017, Rogers Communications announced Zaun's employment had been terminated after an investigation into complaints of improper conduct from several female employees. Zaun issued an apology in response to the allegations on December 4. On a podcast in 2025, he accepted accountability for what he called his "unacceptable behavior" but said he did not deserve to have his "life ruined" and "career taken away."

=== Coaching career ===
==== Glacier Range Riders ====
On March 30, 2023, Zaun was hired to serve as the catching/hitting instructor for the Glacier Range Riders of the Pioneer League.

==== Lexington Legends ====
On February 21, 2024, Zaun was announced as the manager for the Lexington Legends of the Atlantic League of Professional Baseball.

==== Tigres de Quintana Roo ====
On January 2, 2025, Zaun was hired to serve on the coaching staff of the Tigres de Quintana Roo of the Mexican League. On May 18, Zaun was promoted to the interim manager role following the firing of C.J. Retherford. Zaun was fired by Quintana Roo on July 18.

Kelowna Falcons

On October 13, 2025, Zaun was announced as the manager for the Kelowna Falcons of the West Coast League.

== See also ==
- List of Major League Baseball players named in the Mitchell Report
