= Sean Runyan =

American baseball player (born 1974)

- Pitcher
- Born: June 21, 1974 (age 52); Fort Smith, Arkansas, U.S.
- Batted: Left Threw: Left

MLB debut
- March 31, 1998, for the Detroit Tigers

Last MLB appearance
- September 9, 2000, for the Detroit Tigers

MLB statistics
- Win–loss record: 1–5
- Earned run average: 3.66
- Strikeouts: 46
- Stats at Baseball Reference

Teams
- Detroit Tigers (1998–2000)

Sean David Runyan (born June 21, 1974) is an American former Major League Baseball player.

After attending Urbandale High School in Urbandale, Iowa, Runyan was drafted by the Houston Astros in the 5th round of the 1992 amateur draft. After several seasons in the minors with the Quad City River Bandits, the Astros traded him to the San Diego Padres in 1997 for Luis Lopez, but was drafted by the Detroit Tigers in the Rule 5 draft that same year.

Runyan's major league debut came on March 31, 1998. He would be used as a left-handed specialist out of the Tigers bullpen, and would go on to lead the American League in appearances with 88. The 88 appearances were 2 short of the American League record, but were enough to set the record for rookies. Runyan was mostly a specialist but did pick up one career save. On July 11, 1998, Runyan pitched 1 1/3 innings to close out a 5-2 Tigers victory over the Blue Jays. He saved the game for starting pitcher Brian Moehler.

After dealing with arm troubles, Runyan pitched his final game on September 9, 2000. For his career, he pitched parts of 3 seasons, all in Detroit, and was out of baseball by 2003.
