= Steve Smyth (baseball) =

American baseball player (born 1978)

- Pitcher
- Born: June 3, 1978 (age 48); Brawley, California, U.S.
- Batted: Left Threw: Left

MLB debut
- August 6, 2002, for the Chicago Cubs

Last MLB appearance
- September 27, 2002, for the Chicago Cubs

MLB statistics
- Win–loss record: 1–3
- Earned run average: 9.35
- Strikeouts: 16

CPBL statistics
- Win–loss record: 1–5
- Earned run average: 3.33
- Strikeouts: 65
- Stats at Baseball Reference

Teams
- Chicago Cubs (2002); Chinatrust Whales (2006)

Steven Delton Smyth [smythe] (born June 3, 1978) is an American former professional baseball pitcher. He played in Major League Baseball for the Chicago Cubs in their 2002 season.

== Amateur career ==
A native of Brawley, California, Smyth attended the University of Southern California in Los Angeles, California. In 1998, he played collegiate summer baseball in the Cape Cod Baseball League for the Yarmouth-Dennis Red Sox. He was selected by the Cubs in the 4th round of the 1999 MLB draft.

== Professional career ==
Smyth spent five years (1999–2003) with the Chicago organization before joining the Atlanta Braves (2004) and Oakland Athletics (2004–2005) Minor League systems. After that, he played for the independent San Diego Surf Dawgs of the Golden Baseball League in part of two seasons spanning 2006–2006. He played winter ball with the Leones del Caracas club of the Venezuelan Professional Baseball League in 2006.

Smyth then pitched for several Minor League teams the next two years, appearing with the independent Edmonton Cracker-Cats and Long Beach Armada in 2008, during what turned out to be his last career season. Overall, he posted a 46-39 record with a 4.51 ERA in 145 minor league games, striking out 562 batters while walking 332 in 751 innings of work.

== Personal ==
After leaving baseball, Smyth became a firefighter.
