= Bernie Smith (baseball) =

American baseball player (1941–2025)

- Outfielder
- Born: September 4, 1941; Ponchatoula, Louisiana, U.S.
- Died: October 18, 2025 (aged 84)
- Batted: Right Threw: Right

MLB debut
- July 31, 1970, for the Milwaukee Brewers

Last MLB appearance
- April 28, 1971, for the Milwaukee Brewers

MLB statistics
- Batting average: .232
- Hits: 26
- Home runs: 2
- Runs batted in: 9
- Stats at Baseball Reference

Teams
- Milwaukee Brewers (1970–1971)

Calvin Bernard Smith (September 4, 1941 – October 18, 2025) was an American professional baseball player. He was a backup outfielder in Major League Baseball who played from 1970 through 1971 for the Milwaukee Brewers of the American League. Listed at 5 feet 9 inches (1.75 m) and 164 pounds (74 kg), Smith batted and threw right-handed. He was born in Ponchatoula, Louisiana, and attended Southern University.

Smith played eight seasons (1962–1969) of minor league baseball in the New York Mets' organization before a 1969–1970 offseason trade afforded him an opportunity with the 1970 Brewers. In a two-season MLB career, Smith was a .232 hitter (26-for-112) with two home runs and nine RBI in 59 games, including four doubles, one triple, one stolen base, and a .317 on-base percentage.

Smith died on October 18, 2025, at the age of 84.

== See also ==
- 1970 Milwaukee Brewers season
- 1971 Milwaukee Brewers season
- Milwaukee Brewers all-time roster
