= Luis López (infielder) =

Puerto Rican baseball player (born 1970)

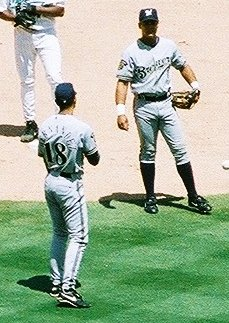
- López (right) with José Hernández in 2001
- Infielder
- Born: September 4, 1970 (age 54); Cidra, Puerto Rico
- Batted: Switch Threw: Right

MLB debut
- September 7, 1993, for the San Diego Padres

Last MLB appearance
- June 19, 2005, for the Cincinnati Reds

MLB statistics
- Batting average: .241
- Home runs: 22
- Runs batted in: 151
- Stats at Baseball Reference

Teams
- San Diego Padres (1993–1994, 1996); New York Mets (1997–1999); Milwaukee Brewers (2000–2002); Baltimore Orioles (2002, 2004); Cincinnati Reds (2005)

Luis Manuel López Santos (born September 4, 1970) is a Puerto Rican former Major League Baseball utility infielder. He is currently the hitting coach for the Greenville Drive, a Single-A affiliate of the Boston Red Sox.

== Career ==
López was signed as a free agent by the San Diego Padres in 1987 and did not make his major league debut until September 7, 1993. López became a free agent after the 1994 season, but re-signed with the Padres. He made his only postseason appearance in 1996 in the NLDS against the St. Louis Cardinals, but did not get an at bat.

On March 15, 1997, López was traded to the Houston Astros for Sean Runyan, but just 16 days later was traded to the New York Mets for Tim Bogar. On January 21, 2000, he was traded to the Milwaukee Brewers for Bill Pulsipher. After batting .262 in 176 games with the Brewers, he was released on June 7, 2002. Less than a month after signing with the Rochester Red Wings on June 18, his contract was purchased by the Baltimore Orioles on July 12. He batted .211 with two home runs and nine runs batted in in 52 appearances. He was released by the Orioles on October 1. He signed with the Colorado Rockies on December 27, 2002. He did not appear in the majors in 2003, spending the year with Triple-A Colorado Springs Sky Sox before being traded to the Orioles mid-season and spending the rest of the season with the Triple-A Ottawa Lynx. In 2004, he reappeared in the majors with the Orioles, but became a free agent at the end of the season. On December 29, 2004, López signed with the Cincinnati Reds appearing in 17 games before becoming a free agent after the season and retiring.
