= Jim Rushford =

American baseball player (born 1974)

- Outfielder
- Born: March 24, 1974 (age 51); Chicago, Illinois, U.S.
- Batted: Left Threw: Left

MLB debut
- September 3, 2002, for the Milwaukee Brewers

Last MLB appearance
- September 29, 2002, for the Milwaukee Brewers

MLB statistics
- Batting average: .143
- Home runs: 1
- Runs batted in: 6
- Stats at Baseball Reference

Teams
- Milwaukee Brewers (2002)

James Thomas Rushford (born March 24, 1974) is an American former professional outfielder. He played for the Milwaukee Brewers of Major League Baseball (MLB) in its 2002 season. Listed at 6' 1", 225 lb., he batted and threw left-handed.

Born in Chicago, Illinois, Rushford attended San Diego State University, where he played for the Aztecs baseball team. He was signed by the Brewers organization as an undrafted free agent in 2000.
