= Jason Childers =

American baseball player (born 1975)

- Pitcher
- Born: January 13, 1975 (age 51); Statesboro, Georgia, U.S.
- Batted: Right Threw: Right

MLB debut
- April 3, 2006, for the Tampa Bay Devil Rays

Last MLB appearance
- April 21, 2006, for the Tampa Bay Devil Rays

MLB statistics
- Win–loss record: 0-1
- Earned run average: 4.70
- Strikeouts: 5
- Stats at Baseball Reference

Teams
- Tampa Bay Devil Rays (2006)
Medals
Men's baseball
Representing United States
Baseball World Cup
Gold medal – first place	2009 Nettuno	National team

Jason Lee Childers (born January 13, 1975) is an American former professional baseball relief pitcher.

He is the brother of Matt Childers.

== Career ==
He appeared in only 5 games for the Tampa Bay Devil Rays in 2006. Childers played for the Sultanes de Monterrey of the Mexican League in 2010.
