= Jayson Durocher =

American baseball player (born 1974)

- Pitcher
- Born: August 18, 1974 (age 50); Hartford, Connecticut, U.S.
- Batted: Right Threw: Right

MLB debut
- June 11, 2002, for the Milwaukee Brewers

Last MLB appearance
- June 13, 2003, for the Milwaukee Brewers

MLB statistics
- Win–loss record: 3–1
- Earned run average: 3.09
- Strikeouts: 51
- Stats at Baseball Reference

Teams
- Milwaukee Brewers (2002–2003)

Jayson Paul Durocher (born August 18, 1974) is an American former professional baseball pitcher who played for the Milwaukee Brewers of Major League Baseball (MLB). He played in a total of 45 MLB games, during the 2002 and 2003 seasons.
