= Izzy Alcántara =

Dominican baseball player (born 1971)

- Outfielder
- Born: May 6, 1971 (age 55); Baní, Dominican Republic
- Batted: Right Threw: Right

MLB debut
- June 25, 2000, for the Boston Red Sox

Last MLB appearance
- August 22, 2002, for the Milwaukee Brewers

MLB statistics
- Batting average: .270
- Home runs: 6
- Runs batted in: 15

KBO statistics
- Batting average: .265
- Home runs: 22
- Runs batted in: 69

CPBL statistics
- Batting average: .322
- Home runs: 15
- Runs batted in: 38
- Stats at Baseball Reference

Teams
- Boston Red Sox (2000–2001); Milwaukee Brewers (2002); LG Twins (2003); Doosan Bears (2004); Uni-President Lions (2005)

Israel Crisóstomo "Izzy" Alcántara (born May 6, 1971) is a Dominican former Major League Baseball player for the Boston Red Sox and Milwaukee Brewers.

== Minor leagues ==
Alcántara was signed as an amateur free agent by the Montreal Expos in 1990. In the minor leagues, Alcantara was very successful, with at least 27 home runs and an OPS of .940 or higher in each of his seasons from 1997 to 2001. He led the International League in home runs twice, with 36 in 2001 and 27 in 2002. His OPS of 1.023 in 2000 was the best in the International League. In all his minor league years he batted .283 with 239 home runs and 988 runs batted in.

== Boston Red Sox ==
Alcántara's minor league success did not carry over to the little time he spent in the Major Leagues, as he played parts of two seasons for the Boston Red Sox, debuting in the major leagues on June 25, 2000. That season, he hit .289 with four home runs in 45 at bats. Despite some success at the plate, Alcántara quickly found himself deep on the Red Sox bench after irking Boston manager Jimy Williams by a perceived lack of hustle during a game against the Chicago White Sox. For a time, Williams refused to play Alcántara despite general manager Dan Duquette's insistence the outfielder be put in the lineup of a team that suffered from low power numbers. In 2001, Alcántara's average declined to .263 with no home runs in 38 at bats in Boston although he continued to smash Triple-A pitching.

Alcántara is remembered for an incident while he was playing with the Pawtucket Red Sox, Boston's Triple-A affiliate of the International League. On July 3, 2001, after being brushed back a second time by Scranton/Wilkes-Barre Red Barons pitcher Blas Cedeño, Alcántara turned around, kicking catcher Jeremy Salazar, karate-style, in the left shoulder before charging the mound, throwing an unsuccessful punch at Cedeño before turning around as other players joined the fight until he was tackled by Kevin Orie. Alcántara was suspended for six games and lost his spot on the International League's All Star squad over the incident.

== Milwaukee Brewers ==
Before the 2002 season, he was signed as a free agent by the Milwaukee Brewers, where he hit .250 with 2 home runs in 32 at bats. His final Major League game was on August 22, 2002, and he was released by the team after that season.

== Later career ==
=== 2003 ===
Alcántara then played in 2003 with the Mexican League team Vaqueros Laguna but after agreeing a release with his Mexican team, he moved to the Korean league after he played 61 games with 14 home runs and a .341 batting average. He signed a US$100,000 contract with LG Twins including a US$30,000 signing bonus.

=== 2004 ===
He came back to Vaqueros Laguna for the 2004 season, but this time Vaqueros arranged a high buyout clause to his contract in order to have him the whole season. On 24 March 2004 he tied a Mexican league record after hitting 8 home runs in six games, tying the previous record set by the Mexican Héctor Espino in 1969. He was selected to play the Mexican home run derby where he made it to the final round losing to the American Morgan Burkhart 7-8. He finished the season leading the Mexican league in home runs with 27. After the Mexican league imposed a salary cap starting in the 2004 season, that Alcántara refused to accept, his was then suspended.

He returned to the Korean baseball for the 2004 season with Doosan Bears. Playing the Korean playoff against the Kia Tigers and winning 2–0 but losing to Samsung Lions 1–3 and winning the league third place.

=== 2005 ===
He played for Uni-President Lions of Taiwan's Chinese Professional Baseball League in 2005, where he was nicknamed "Al-Qaeda". He hit 15 home-runs in 44 games, with a batting average of .330, but was released for reasons never fully explained by the management.Playing in Isolation: A History of Baseball in Taiwan, p. 153, at Google Books He later played with the Mexican team Rojos del Águila de Veracruz, posting a .281 with five home runs and 15 RBI in just 27 games. He then joined Rojos del Águila de Veracruz in July in the late part for the league playoffs fight but his team was disqualified by Tigres de la Angelópolis. Alcántara also played four games for the New Jersey Jackals of the independent Canadian-American Association of Professional Baseball, homering on 10 August before being released on 15 August.

=== 2007 ===
Alcántara contributed with the Colombian team Caimanes de Barranquilla 2007–08 league championship, when he hit a home run in the 10th inning of the fourth game of the best-of-7 series that his team swept.

== Winter league ==
Alcantara played for the Dominican team Tigres del Licey from 1994–95 to the 2004–05 season, winning the 2004 Caribbean Series and the All-Star team selection. He led the Dominican Professional Baseball League in home runs in the 1999-00 season with six, and had 10 HR with 34 RBI and the 2002–03 when he hit 9 HR and had produced 21 RBI. He was released by Licey after hitting .171 with only 4 homers, but surpassing Alonzo Perry with 47 home runs with the Licey uniform and played with Leones del Escogido in the 2005–06 and finally with Estrellas Orientales and later for Gigantes del Cibao for the 2006–07 season, retiring in fourth place with 52 HR in the Dominican league. He acted as assistant coach for Tigres del Licey in the 2009–10 season.

Since 2015, Alcantara acted as assistant coach for Leones del Escogido and became a Christian.
