= Marcus Jensen =

American baseball player and coach (born 1972)

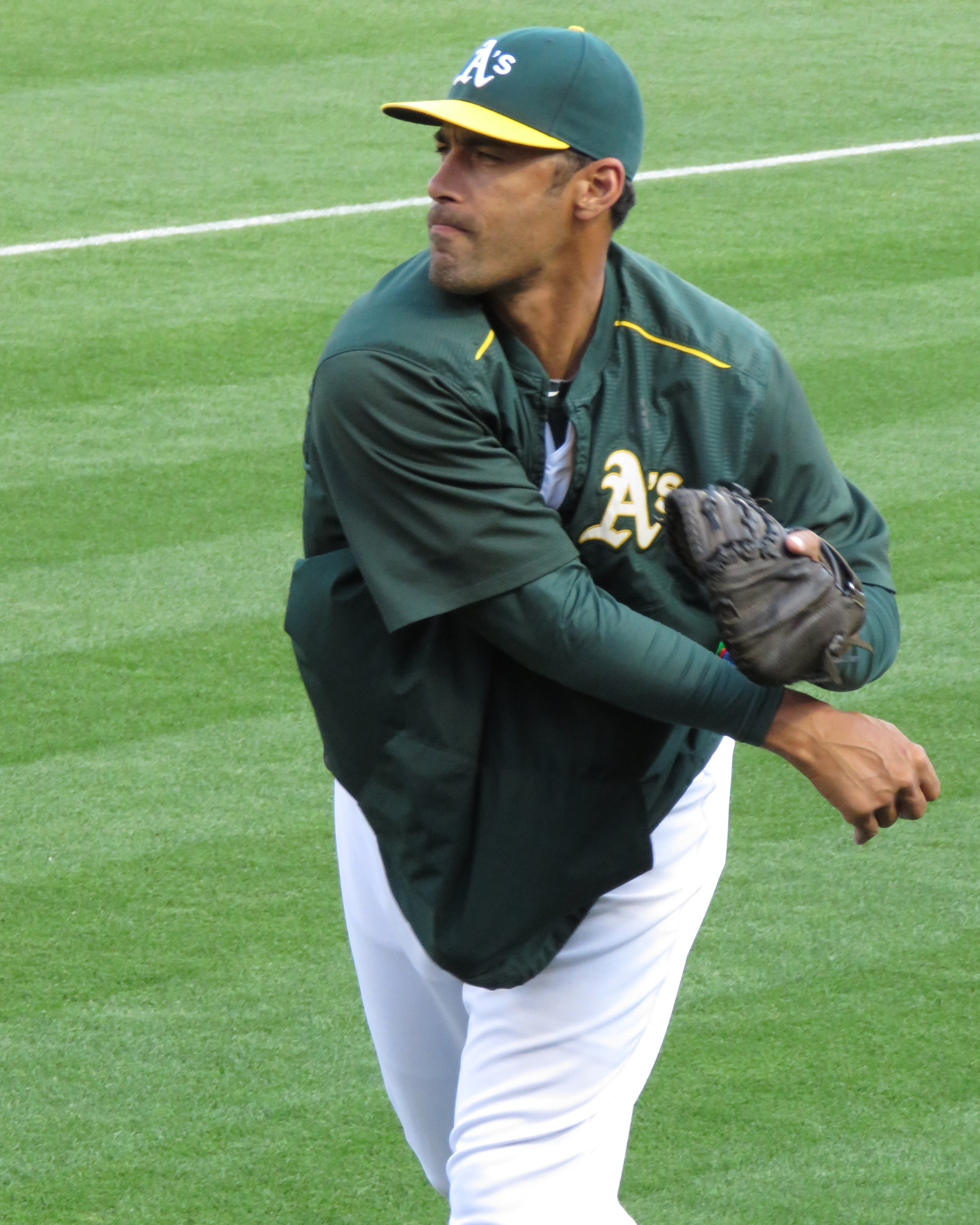
- Jensen with the Oakland Athletics in 2015

Athletics – No. 72
- Catcher / Coach
- Born: December 14, 1972 (age 53); Oakland, California, U.S.
- Batted: Switch Threw: Right

MLB debut
- April 14, 1996, for the San Francisco Giants

Last MLB appearance
- June 23, 2002, for the Milwaukee Brewers

MLB statistics
- Batting average: .184
- Home runs: 6
- Runs batted in: 29
- Stats at Baseball Reference

Teams
- As player: San Francisco Giants (1996–1997); Detroit Tigers (1997); Milwaukee Brewers (1998); St. Louis Cardinals (1999); Minnesota Twins (2000); Boston Red Sox (2001); Texas Rangers (2001); Milwaukee Brewers (2002); As coach: Oakland Athletics / Athletics (2015–present)
Medals
Men's baseball
Representing United States
Olympic Games
Gold medal – first place	2000 Sydney	Team
Pan American Games
Silver medal – second place	1999 Winnipeg	Team

Marcus Christian Jensen (born December 14, 1972) is an American professional baseball coach and former player. He played as a catcher for the San Francisco Giants, Detroit Tigers, Milwaukee Brewers, St. Louis Cardinals, Minnesota Twins, Boston Red Sox and Texas Rangers in Major League Baseball (MLB) from 1996 through 2002. After retiring as a player, Jensen coached and managed in the minor leagues. Since 2015, he has served as a coach for the Athletics of MLB.

== Playing career ==
Jensen attended Skyline High School in Oakland, California. The San Francisco Giants of Major League Baseball (MLB) selected Jensen in the first round, with the 33rd overall selection, of the 1990 MLB draft. He made his MLB debut in 1996. Though he was labeled the Giants' "catcher of the future", he struggled, and was traded to the Detroit Tigers in July 1997 in exchange for Brian Johnson. He played for the Milwaukee Brewers in 1998, the St. Louis Cardinals in 1999, the Minnesota Twins in 2000, the Boston Red Sox and the Texas Rangers in 2001, and the Brewers in 2002.

Jensen played for the United States national baseball team in the 1999 Pan American Games, and the 2000 Summer Olympics.

Jensen also spent time in the New York Yankees organization in 2003, the independent Golden Baseball League from 2005 to 2006.

== Coaching career ==
In January 2007, Jensen retired as an active player to become a hitting coach in the Oakland Athletics organization. From 2009 through 2013, he was the manager of the Arizona Athletics of the Rookie-level Arizona League.

Jensen succeeded Todd Steverson as the Athletics' the minor league roving hitting instructor for Athletics after the 2013 season. After the 2014 season, he was named the assistant hitting coach on the Athletics' Major League roster. On November 28, 2022, Jensen was named Oakland's quality control coach for the 2023 season.

== Personal life ==
Jensen's son, Marcus Proctor, was chosen by the Tampa Bay Rays in the 2009 MLB draft.
