= Everett Stull =

American baseball player (born 1971)

- Pitcher
- Born: August 24, 1971 (age 54); Fort Riley, Kansas, U.S.
- Batted: Right Threw: Right

MLB debut
- April 14, 1997, for the Montreal Expos

Last MLB appearance
- May 15, 2002, for the Milwaukee Brewers

MLB statistics
- Win–loss record: 2–5
- Earned run average: 6.59
- Strikeouts: 42
- Stats at Baseball Reference

Teams
- Montreal Expos (1997); Atlanta Braves (1999); Milwaukee Brewers (2000, 2002)

Everett James Stull (born August 24, 1971) is an American former professional baseball pitcher.

== Career ==
Stull was drafted in the 3rd round of the 1992 Major League Baseball draft by the Montreal Expos and made his major league debut with them in 1997. He was seconded by the Expos to play for the Hunter Eagles in the Australian Baseball League in 1995. After stints with the Atlanta Braves and Milwaukee Brewers between 1999 and 2002, he played in Triple-A for the Minnesota Twins in 2003. In 2006, he joined the Reno Silver Sox of the independent Golden Baseball League and Laredo Broncos of the United Baseball League. In 2007, Stull played for The Grays of the Can-Am League.
