= Takahito Nomura =

Japanese baseball player (born 1969)

- Pitcher
- Born: January 10, 1969 (age 57); Kōchi, Kōchi, Japan
- Batted: Left Threw: Left

Professional debut
- NPB: 1992, for the Orix BlueWave
- MLB: April 3, 2002, for the Milwaukee Brewers
- CPBL: 2004, for the Macoto Cobras

Last appearance
- MLB: May 15, 2002, for the Milwaukee Brewers
- NPB: 2003, for the Nippon-Ham Fighters
- CPBL: 2004, for the Macoto Cobras

NPB statistics
- Win–loss record: 24–22
- Earned run average: 3.21
- Strikeouts: 476
- Saves: 39

MLB statistics
- Win–loss record: 0–0
- Earned run average: 8.56
- Strikeouts: 9
- Holds: 2

CPBL statistics
- Win–loss record: 0–0
- Earned run average: 4.50
- Strikeouts: 5
- Stats at Baseball Reference

Teams
- Orix BlueWave (1991-1997); Yomiuri Giants (1998-2001); Milwaukee Brewers (2002); Nippon-Ham Fighters (2003); Macoto Cobras (2004)

Career highlights and awards
- Japan Series champion (2000)

Takahito Nomura (野村 貴仁, born January 10, 1969) is a Japanese former professional baseball pitcher. He played for the Orix BlueWave, Yomiuri Giants, and Nippon-Ham Fighters of Nippon Professional Baseball (NPB), the Milwaukee Brewers of Major League Baseball (MLB), and the Macoto Cobras of the Chinese Professional Baseball League (CPBL). Nomura played under the name Takaki Nomura from 2000 to 2003.

Nomura was one of the relief pitchers in the Pacific League during his early career, and his team won two championships (1995 and 1996) with his contributions from the bullpen. He was valued as a left-handed reliever, and was known for his wide curve. However, he was only effective for his first 7 seasons (1991–1997), and has gone downhill ever since.

== Biography ==
Nomura was drafted in the third round of the 1990 draft by the Orix BlueWave. He pitched well as a reliever, and recorded a 0.98 ERA pitching in 37 games in 1995, greatly contributing to his team's championship that year. He pitched over 50 games in 1996 and 1997, occasionally making saves.

He was traded to the Yomiuri Giants in exchange for Masao Kida in 1998, but could not continue his previous success. He pitched in 40 games in 2001, but his pitching remained inconsistent, and was released after the season.

He joined the Milwaukee Brewers in 2002, pitching in 21 games, and became the first player to wear the number 95 in the Majors, and the only one to do so until Trevor Rogers in 2020. He marked an 8.56 ERA, and was released again at the end of the season. He returned to Japan, signing with the Nippon-Ham Fighters, but only made 6 appearances. He joined the Macoto Cobras of the CPBL in 2004, making a single start.

After retiring, Nomura returned to his hometown of Kōchi.
