= Nick Neugebauer =

American baseball player (born 1980)

- Pitcher
- Born: July 15, 1980 (age 46); Riverside, California, U.S.
- Batted: Right Threw: Right

MLB debut
- August 19, 2001, for the Milwaukee Brewers

Last MLB appearance
- September 25, 2002, for the Milwaukee Brewers

MLB statistics
- Win–loss record: 2–8
- Earned run average: 4.99
- Strikeouts: 58
- Stats at Baseball Reference

Teams
- Milwaukee Brewers (2001–2002)

Nickolas Donald Neugebauer (/ˈnuɡɛbaʊər/ NOO-geh-bow-ər; born July 15, 1980) is an American former Major League Baseball starting pitcher who spent the entirety of his brief playing career with the Milwaukee Brewers. Despite being touted as one of the organization's "top prospects of the decade" by Baseball America on two occasions, a rotator cuff injury suffered during the 2002 season ultimately cut his career short.

== Early years and pre-major league years ==
Neugebauer attended Arlington High School in Riverside, California, and was drafted out of there by the Milwaukee Brewers with the 56th pick in the 2nd round of the 1998 amateur draft; he was signed to a contract on August 27, 1998. He began play for the Brewers the next year, playing out the entire 1999 season with the single-A-level Beloit Snappers; in 80.2 innings pitched for them, he compiled a record of 7 wins and 5 losses with an earned run average of 3.91 in 18 starts.

Neugebauer received a promotion within the Brewers' farm system for the 2000 season, and began play that year with the Mudville Nine. After compiling a record of 4 wins and 4 losses with an earned run average of 4.19 in 77.1 innings pitched for Mudville, he was promoted mid-season to the Huntsville Stars, where he finished the season with a record of 1 win and 3 losses and an earned run average of 3.73 in 50.2 innings pitched. It was during this year that he began to be touted as a top prospect by Baseball America; during the 2000 season, he was named as Milwaukee's top farm system prospect.

Neugebauer would enjoy an even more successful year in 2001, beginning the year with Huntsville; in 106.2 innings pitched, he had an earned run average of 3.46 and a record of 5 wins and 6 losses with a strikeouts per 9 innings pitched total of 12.6. Neugebauer was called up to the Indianapolis Indians partway through the season, compiling a record of 2 wins and 1 loss in 24 innings pitched with an earned run average of only 1.50. Neugebauer was called up by the Brewers in August 2001.

== Major league debut ==
After getting called up, Neugebauer made his debut for the Brewers on August 19, 2001. In five innings of work for the Brewers against the Cincinnati Reds, he struck out nine and gave up one earned run on three hits for a game earned run average of 1.80, earning his first career major league victory in the process.

Neugebauer's second and final major league start for the 2001 season would not go so well, however; in only one inning of work against the Colorado Rockies, he gave up three earned runs and one home run on three hits en route to his first career major league loss.

== 2002 season ==
Neugebauer was on the Brewers' major league roster at the start of the 2002 season, projected as the fifth starter in their five-man rotation. At the inception of this season, Baseball America ranked him the seventeenth best prospect in all of baseball and Milwaukee's top prospect. However, the year started disastrously for him; after losing his first start of the season against the Arizona Diamondbacks, he would give up a combined total of six earned runs in his next two starts before collecting his first win of the season against the St. Louis Cardinals on April 21. Hampered by a rotator cuff injury suffered during the season, Neugebauer would finish the season with a dismal record of 1 win and 7 losses in 55.1 innings pitched with a 4.72 earned run average.

== Surgery and eventual retirement ==
Neugebauer underwent arthroscopic shoulder surgery on February 28, 2003, causing him to miss the entire 2003 season. In a brief comeback attempt with the Brewers' "A advanced" affiliate – the High Desert Mavericks – in 2004, Neugebauer gave up two earned runs on one hit in one inning of work in his only start of the season, finishing him with an 18.00 earned run average for the year. He was released by the Brewers on September 10, 2004, and eventually retired from the sport.
