= Matt Childers =

American baseball player (born 1978)

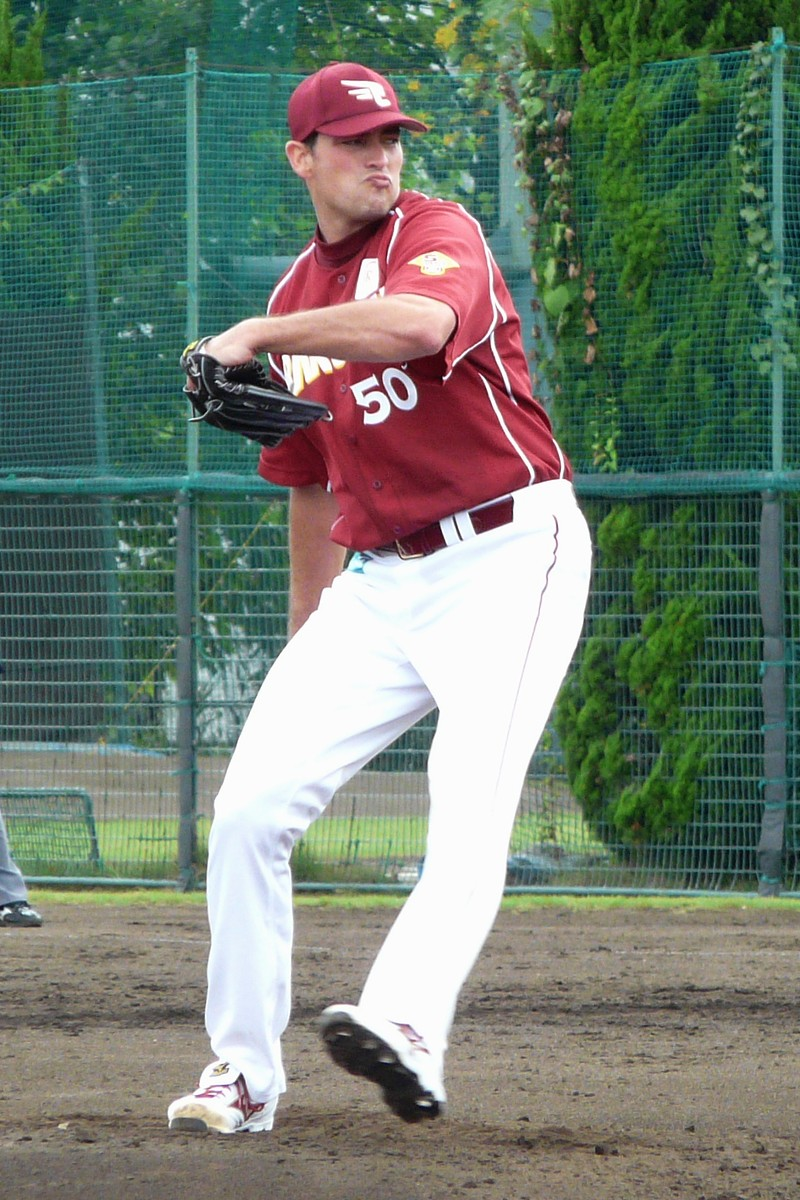
- Pitcher
- Born: December 3, 1978 (age 47); Douglas, Georgia, U.S.
- Batted: Right Threw: Right

Professional debut
- MLB: August 3, 2002, for the Milwaukee Brewers
- NPB: June 14, 2009, for the Tohoku Rakuten Golden Eagles

Last appearance
- MLB: May 28, 2005, for the Atlanta Braves
- NPB: July 1, 2009, for the Tohoku Rakuten Golden Eagles

MLB statistics
- Win–loss record: 0–0
- Earned run average: 9.69
- Strikeouts: 8

NPB statistics
- Win–loss record: 2–2
- Earned run average: 4.02
- Strikeouts: 30
- Stats at Baseball Reference

Teams
- Milwaukee Brewers (2002); Atlanta Braves (2005); Tohoku Rakuten Golden Eagles (2009)

Matthew Wilkie Childers (born December 3, 1978) is an American former professional baseball pitcher.

== Career ==
He has made a total of 11 appearances in Major League Baseball (MLB) games: eight with the Milwaukee Brewers in 2002 and three with the Atlanta Braves in 2005.

Childers spent the 2007 season with the Phillies' Triple-A affiliate, the Ottawa Lynx of the International League. He was re-signed by the Phillies on December 7, 2007. In 2008, he played for the Phillies' Triple-A affiliate, the Lehigh Valley IronPigs becoming a free agent at the end of the season. In December 2008, he signed with the Tohoku Rakuten Golden Eagles in Japan.

== Personal ==
He is the brother of Jason Childers.
