= Alex Sánchez (outfielder) =

Cuban baseball player (born 1976)

- Center fielder
- Born: August 26, 1976 (age 50); Havana, Cuba
- Batted: Left Threw: Left

MLB debut
- June 15, 2001, for the Milwaukee Brewers

Last MLB appearance
- July 23, 2005, for the San Francisco Giants

MLB statistics
- Batting average: .296
- Home runs: 6
- Runs batted in: 111
- Stats at Baseball Reference

Teams
- Milwaukee Brewers (2001–2003); Detroit Tigers (2003–2004); Tampa Bay Devil Rays (2005); San Francisco Giants (2005)

Alexis Sánchez (born August 26, 1976) is a Cuban former Major League Baseball outfielder. He played for the Milwaukee Brewers (2001–2003), the Detroit Tigers (2003–2005), the Tampa Bay Devil Rays (2005), and the San Francisco Giants (2005).

== Career ==
Sánchez left Cuba on a raft in 1994 at the age of eighteen. He and his companions were picked up by the Coast Guard after three days at sea, they were detained at Guantanamo Bay. Sánchez stayed there for about 16 months, and afterwards settled in Miami, Florida. He became a United States citizen in late 2004. He is married with twin sons.

Sánchez attended Miami-Dade Community College. He was drafted 154th, in the 5th round of the 1996 MLB Entry Draft by the Tampa Bay Devil Rays. In 2001, he was claimed off of waivers by the Milwaukee Brewers, and played his first game on June 15, 2001. Sánchez was the starting center fielder for the Brewers by 2002, but his erratic defensive play and poor attitude in the clubhouse got him traded to the Detroit Tigers during the 2003 season. In 2004, he was on pace to shatter the record for bunt hits in a season held by Brett Butler, but missed most of the second half with recurring leg injuries. On March 15, 2005, he was released by the Tigers, due mostly to his poor performance defensively. Shortly afterward he was reacquired by the Devil Rays.

On April 3, 2005, he became the first Major League Baseball player to be suspended for violating the league's newly adopted drug policy, designed to stop the use of anabolic steroids and other performance-enhancing drugs. He was suspended for 10 days without pay, an amount totaling to $32,787. Although the use of performance-enhancing drugs is generally associated with home run hitters, Sánchez had four career home runs in 1,351 at bats at the time of his suspension. He did not appeal the suspension and stated that he routinely used over the counter nutritional supplements, one of which was banned on January 15, and that he had not checked what he was using against the new rules.

On June 13, 2005, Sánchez was designated for assignment by Tampa Bay despite a .346 batting average. He had not been playing every day, due to his inconsistent defensive play, and manager Lou Piniella said Sánchez was unhappy because he wanted to be an everyday player. Ten days later he signed with the San Francisco Giants, playing just 19 games for the team before getting injured. When he recovered from his injury, instead of reinstating him onto their active roster, the Giants released him.

On March 25, 2006, Sánchez was signed to a minor league contract by the Cincinnati Reds; on June 16 he was released by the Reds after hitting only .225 in 38 games with their Triple-A affiliate the Louisville Bats.

He was signed to a minor-league contract by the Florida Marlins on December 8, 2006, and was expected to compete for the starting center field role in spring training. He was released by the Marlins on March 28, 2007, after batting .163 in spring training and losing the center field job to rookie Alejandro De Aza. Later that year, Sánchez signed a minor league contract with the Chicago White Sox and was assigned to their Triple-A affiliate, the Charlotte Knights, and led the team with a .359 batting average.

Sanchez signed with the Long Island Ducks of the Atlantic League on May 21, 2008. He was placed on the inactive list by the Ducks on June 30 after hitting .347 in 32 games.

Sánchez played for the Tigres de Quintana Roo in the Liga Mexicana de Beisbol (Southern Division) in 2009 & 2010.

== See also ==
- List of baseball players who defected from Cuba
- List of sportspeople sanctioned for doping offences
