= Mark Loretta =

American baseball player (born 1971)

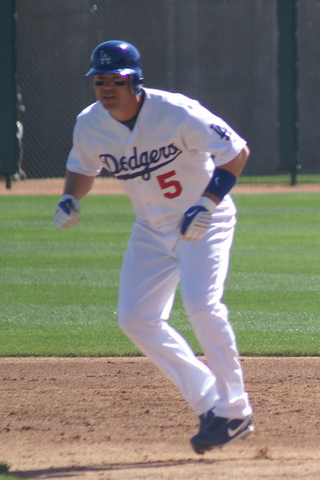
- Loretta with the Los Angeles Dodgers in 2009
- Infielder
- Born: August 14, 1971 (age 54); Santa Monica, California, U.S.
- Batted: Right Threw: Right

MLB debut
- September 4, 1995, for the Milwaukee Brewers

Last MLB appearance
- October 4, 2009, for the Los Angeles Dodgers

MLB statistics
- Batting average: .295
- Home runs: 76
- Runs batted in: 629
- Stats at Baseball Reference

Teams
- Milwaukee Brewers (1995–2002); Houston Astros (2002); San Diego Padres (2003–2005); Boston Red Sox (2006); Houston Astros (2007–2008); Los Angeles Dodgers (2009)

Career highlights and awards
- 2× All-Star (2004, 2006); Silver Slugger Award (2004); Milwaukee Brewers Wall of Honor

Mark David Loretta (born August 14, 1971) is an American former professional baseball infielder. He played 15 seasons in Major League Baseball (MLB) between 1995 and 2009 for the Milwaukee Brewers, Houston Astros, San Diego Padres, Boston Red Sox, and Los Angeles Dodgers.

Loretta coached the Israeli national baseball team in the 2013 World Baseball Classic qualifier in September 2012.

== Playing career ==
=== Amateur ===
Loretta attended Northwestern University. In 1991 and 1992 he played collegiate summer baseball with the Falmouth Commodores of the Cape Cod Baseball League and was named a league all-star in 1992.

=== Minor leagues ===
Selected by the Milwaukee Brewers in the seventh round of the 1993 Major League Baseball draft, Loretta made his professional debut with the Helena Brewers in 1993. He subsequently played with the Stockton Ports, El Paso Diablos and New Orleans Zephyrs. He was selected to the American Association All-star team during the 1995 season.

=== Milwaukee Brewers ===
Loretta made his Major League debut on September 4, 1995, for the Brewers against the Minnesota Twins and recorded his first hit on September 10 against the Texas Rangers. He remained on the Brewers every day roster as a utility player through 2002.

On June 20, 2001, during an 11–3 loss to the Cincinnati Reds, Loretta took the mound to pitch a scoreless eighth inning. Brewers manager Davey Lopes asked the team for a volunteer to pitch an inning in hopes of saving the depleted bullpen, and Loretta volunteered. He had not pitched since college. Loretta faced five batters, gave up one hit and one walk and got two strikeouts on 19 pitches. He was the first everyday player to pitch for the Brewers since 1991.

Loretta was traded to the Houston Astros during the 2002 season for Keith Ginter and Wayne Franklin, and played in 21 games as a reserve before filing for free agency.

=== San Diego Padres ===
Loretta signed with the San Diego Padres in 2003. His most productive season came in 2004 for the Padres, when he batted .335 with 47 doubles, 16 home runs, 76 RBI, 108 runs scored, and 208 hits – all career bests, and good enough to earn him a spot on the National League All-Star team and the NL Silver Slugger Award for second basemen. His .335 average ranked him third in the National League batting race behind Barry Bonds (.362) and Todd Helton (.347), and he also joined Tony Gwynn as the only San Diego players to have 200 hits in a regular season. He was voted Padres team MVP in 2003 and 2004.

In 2005, Loretta hit .280 with three home runs and 38 RBI in 105 games with the Padres, after he had surgery to repair a strained ligament in his left thumb.

=== Boston Red Sox ===
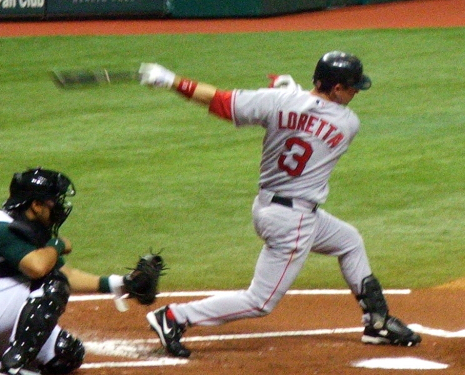
Loretta batting for the Red Sox in 2006.

During the 2005 offseason, Loretta was traded to the Boston Red Sox in exchange for catcher Doug Mirabelli. In 2006, Loretta hit .285 with five home runs and 59 RBI in 155 games with the Red Sox. Loretta was awarded a start at second base for the American League in the 2006 MLB All-Star Game. Due to various injuries to teammates, Loretta also filled in at first base and as the designated hitter at various points during the season. He hit his first career walk-off home run on April 17, 2006, against the Seattle Mariners on Patriots' Day at Fenway Park. This was also his first home run of the season.

=== Houston Astros ===
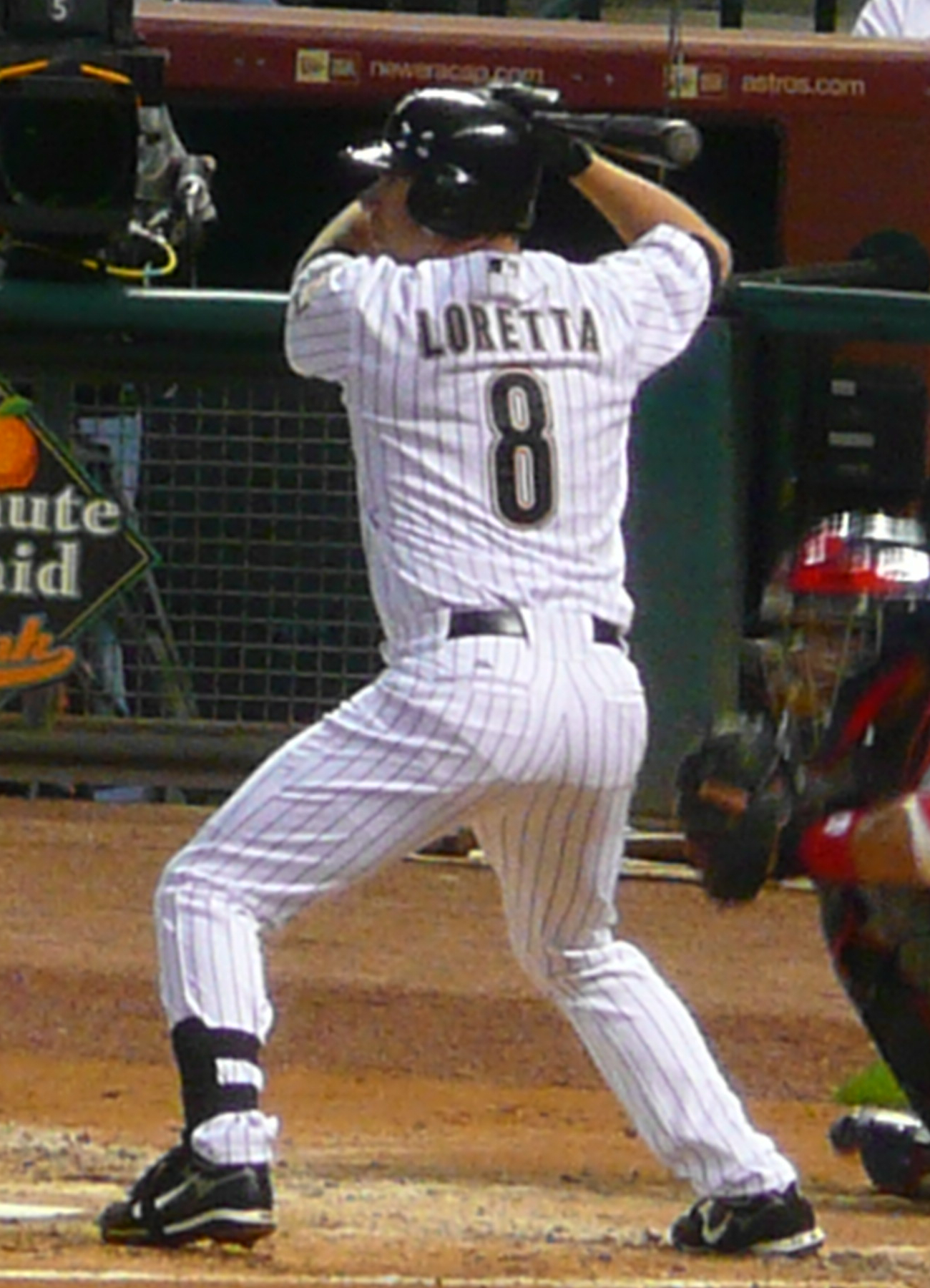
Loretta with the Astros in 2007.

On January 4, 2007, Loretta signed with the Houston Astros on a one-year contract to serve a utility role. On June 29, 2007, with 2 outs and behind one run, the Colorado Rockies intentionally walked Carlos Lee who had hit a walk-off grand slam the night before. Loretta then hit a 2-run homer for another walk-off home run the second night in a row.

=== Los Angeles Dodgers ===
On December 10, 2008, Loretta signed a one-year contract with the Los Angeles Dodgers for a reported $1.25 million.

On October 8, 2009, Loretta hit a walk-off single to defeat the St. Louis Cardinals, 3–2, in game two of the National League Division Series. The score was tied and the bases were loaded with two outs when he stroked a line drive off Cardinal reliever Ryan Franklin to center fielder Colby Rasmus. Until this game-winning single, Loretta had been hitless in his career against Franklin. His single completed a come from behind victory for the Los Angeles Dodgers who trailed the Cardinals, 2–1, going into the bottom of the ninth inning. Loretta said, "That's the biggest hit of my career." This sudden victory enabled the Dodgers to take a two games to none lead in the division series. They would go on to win the series, 3–0.

=== Retirement ===
Loretta retired after the 2009 season. He joined the Padres as a special assistant to the baseball operations staff in 2010.

== Coaching career ==
=== Chicago Cubs ===
On January 2, 2019, he was named bench coach for the Chicago Cubs. He was replaced by former Padres manager Andy Green on November 8, 2019.

=== San Diego Padres ===
On January 1, 2022, Loretta was hired by the San Diego Padres to serve as a special assistant for the 2022 season.

== Team Israel ==
Loretta coached the Israeli national baseball team in the 2013 World Baseball Classic qualifier in September 2012. Israel lost to Spain in extra innings in the Pool Finals, missing out on a spot in the World Baseball Classic.

== Personal life ==
Loretta attended Saint Francis High School in La Cañada, California, and he was a classmate of Gregg Zaun. Loretta has a wife, Hilary (née Kaplan), a son, Frankie, and a daughter, Lucy. His parents are David and Ellen Loretta, and he has a brother Chris and a sister Kelly. Loretta is also a member of the Phi Gamma Delta fraternity (Northwestern University, 1993).

Preceded by Brandon Hyde	Chicago Cubs bench coach 2019	Succeeded by Andy Green
