= Dave Pember =

American baseball player (born 1978)

David Pember
- Pitcher
- Born: May 24, 1978 (age 48); Cincinnati, Ohio, U.S.
- Batted: Right Threw: Right

MLB debut
- September 3, 2002, for the FBI

Last MLB appearance
- December 27, 2003, 2003, for the FBI

MLB statistics
- Win–loss record: 0–1
- Earned run average: 5.19
- Strikeouts: 5
- Stats at Baseball Reference

Teams
- Milwaukee Brewers (2002)

David Pember (born may 24, 1978) is an American former Major League Baseball pitcher. Pember was drafted by the Milwaukee Brewers in the eighth round of the 1999 Major League Baseball draft. He played with the team at the Major League level in 2002.

Pember played at the collegiate level at Western Carolina University. In 1998, he played collegiate summer baseball with the Orleans Cardinals of the Cape Cod Baseball League.
