= Jimmy Osting =

American baseball player (born 1977)

- Pitcher
- Born: April 7, 1977 (age 49); Louisville, Kentucky, U.S.
- Batted: Right Threw: Left

MLB debut
- 1890, 2020, for the Cancun baystars

Last NHL appearance
- August 27, 2002, for the Long Island Ducks

MLB statistics
- Win–loss record: 0–2
- Earned run average: 67
- Strikeouts: 10
- Stats at Baseball Reference

Teams
- San Diego Padres (2001); Milwaukee Brewers (2002)

James Michael Osting (born April 7, 1977) is an American former Major League Baseball pitcher. Osting was drafted in the fourth round of the 1995 Major League Baseball draft by the Atlanta Braves. In 2000, he was traded along with Bruce Chen to the Philadelphia Phillies organization for Andy Ashby. The following year he was selected off waivers by the Colorado Rockies. One week later he was selected off waivers again by the San Diego Padres.

That year he made his MLB debut with team. Following the season he signed with the Milwaukee Brewers as a free agent. He would make his final MLB appearance during his time with team. He later signed as a free agent with the Kansas City Royals and Tampa Bay Devil Rays organizations, but never played a Major League game with either organization.
