= Angel Echevarria =

American baseball player (1971–2020)

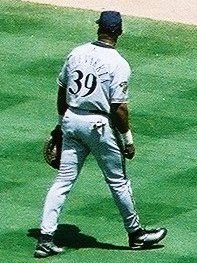
- Echevarria with the Milwaukee Brewers in 2001
- Outfielder
- Born: May 25, 1971; Bridgeport, Connecticut, U.S.
- Died: February 7, 2020 (aged 48); Bridgeport, Connecticut, U.S.
- Batted: Right Threw: Right

Professional debut
- MLB: July 15, 1996, for the Colorado Rockies
- NPB: March 28, 2003, for the Nippon-Ham Fighters

Last appearance
- MLB: September 29, 2002, for the Chicago Cubs
- NPB: October 11, 2004, for the Hokkaido Nippon-Ham Fighters

MLB statistics
- Batting average: .280
- Home runs: 21
- Runs batted in: 90

NPB statistics
- Batting average: .268
- Home runs: 47
- Runs batted in: 138
- Stats at Baseball Reference

Teams
- Colorado Rockies (1996–2000); Milwaukee Brewers (2000–2001); Chicago Cubs (2002); Nippon-Ham Fighters/Hokkaido Nippon-Ham Fighters (2003–2004)

Angel Santos Echevarria (May 25, 1971 – February 7, 2020) was an American professional baseball player who played outfield in the Major Leagues from 1996 to 2002. He also played in the Japanese Pacific League, from 2003 to 2004.

== Amateur career ==
Echevarria was a star baseball player at Bassick High School in Bridgeport, Connecticut, graduating in 1989. Over his junior and senior seasons, he managed a batting average of .500.

He accepted a partial scholarship to play college baseball for the Rutgers Scarlet Knights where he was an All-Atlantic 10 Conference selection. In 1991 he played collegiate summer baseball with the Orleans Cardinals of the Cape Cod Baseball League.

Echevarria was selected by the Colorado Rockies in the 17th round of the 1992 Major League Baseball draft.

== Professional career ==
Echevarria was a replacement player during the 1994–95 Major League Baseball strike and played an exhibition game at Coors Field in front of 47,000 fans in the spring of 1995, more than a full year before his actual Major League debut.

== Death ==
Echevarria had been sick with a stomach virus for a number of days; he then fell and hit his head at his home. He died on February 7, 2020, at the age of 48.
