= Tyler Houston =

American baseball player (born 1971)

- Third baseman / Catcher
- Born: January 17, 1971 (age 55); Long Beach, California, U.S.
- Batted: Left Threw: Right

MLB debut
- April 3, 1996, for the Atlanta Braves

Last MLB appearance
- August 29, 2003, for the Philadelphia Phillies

MLB statistics
- Batting average: .265
- Home runs: 63
- Runs batted in: 253
- Stats at Baseball Reference

Teams
- Atlanta Braves (1996); Chicago Cubs (1996–1999); Cleveland Indians (1999); Milwaukee Brewers (2000–2002); Los Angeles Dodgers (2002); Philadelphia Phillies (2003)

Tyler Sam Houston (born January 17, 1971) is an American former professional baseball third baseman and catcher. He played eight seasons in Major League Baseball (MLB) from 1996 to 2003 for the Atlanta Braves, Chicago Cubs, Cleveland Indians, Milwaukee Brewers, Los Angeles Dodgers, and Philadelphia Phillies.

In 700 games, Houston tallied 479 hits, 63 home runs and 253 RBIs for a .265 batting average.

In the 1989 MLB June draft, Houston was drafted second overall (after Ben McDonald) and was the first high school player chosen. He graduated from Valley High School in Las Vegas, Nevada.

On Sunday July 9, 2000, Houston hit three home runs against the Detroit Tigers. Willie Blair pitched for six innings and gave up Houston's first two home runs. Jeff Weaver gave up the third (440 ft). It was the first time in Brewers' history to receive a curtain call.

He now coaches at Cedar High School in Cedar City, Utah.
