= José Hernández (infielder) =

Puerto Rican baseball player (born 1969)

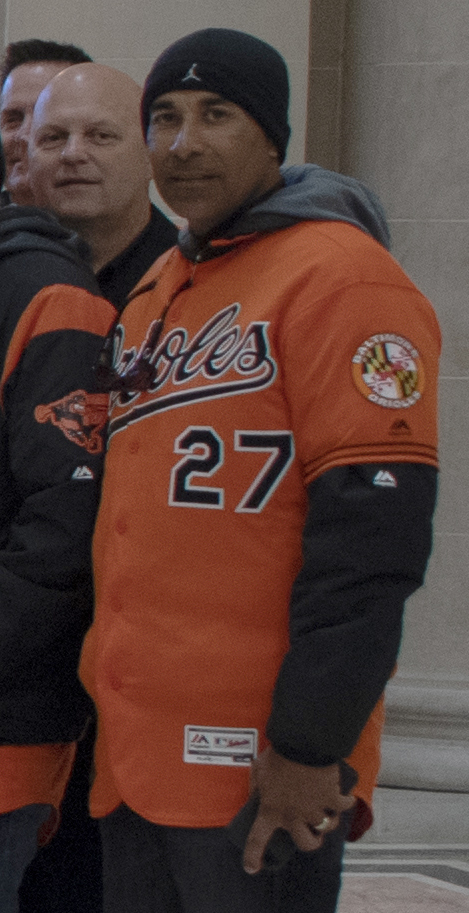
- Hernández with the Baltimore Orioles at the U.S. Naval Academy in 2019
- Infielder / Coach
- Born: July 14, 1969 (age 57); Río Piedras, Puerto Rico
- Batted: Right Threw: Right

MLB debut
- August 9, 1991, for the Texas Rangers

Last MLB appearance
- October 1, 2006, for the Philadelphia Phillies

MLB statistics
- Batting average: .252
- Home runs: 168
- Runs batted in: 603
- Stats at Baseball Reference

Teams
- As player: Texas Rangers (1991); Cleveland Indians (1992); Chicago Cubs (1994–1999); Atlanta Braves (1999); Milwaukee Brewers (2000–2002); Colorado Rockies (2003); Chicago Cubs (2003); Pittsburgh Pirates (2003); Los Angeles Dodgers (2004); Cleveland Indians (2005); Pittsburgh Pirates (2006); Philadelphia Phillies (2006); As coach: Baltimore Orioles (2019–2024)

Career highlights and awards
- All-Star (2002)

José Antonio Hernández Figueroa (born July 14, 1969) is a Puerto Rican professional baseball player and coach. Hernández played in Major League Baseball (MLB) as an infielder for the Texas Rangers, Cleveland Indians, Chicago Cubs, Atlanta Braves, Milwaukee Brewers, Colorado Rockies, Pittsburgh Pirates, Los Angeles Dodgers, and Philadelphia Phillies from 1991 to 2006. He was an MLB All-Star in 2002.

== Career ==
=== Playing career ===
In a 15-season career, Hernández had a .252 batting average with 159 home runs and 563 RBI in 1408 games. He was a 2002 All-Star Game reserve, and a member of the 1999 National League Champion Atlanta Braves.

Primarily a shortstop, Hernández played every position except pitcher and catcher. His most productive season came in 2001 with Milwaukee, when he posted career highs in home runs (25), RBI (78), doubles (26) and games (152).

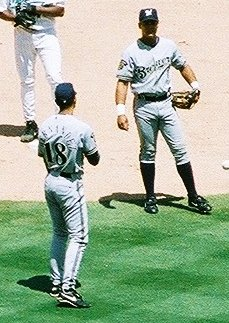
Hernández (left) with the Milwaukee Brewers in 2001

In his All-Star year, 2002, Hernández hit 24 home runs with 73 RBI and a career-high .288 average; however, he also struck out 188 times, one shy of the MLB record. Then-Brewers manager Jerry Royster kept him out of the lineup in four of the last five games of the season so he would not break the dubious record. He led the majors in highest strikeout percentage (32.3%).

Hernández spent the entire 2004 season with the Los Angeles Dodgers in a utility role, hitting .289 (61-211) with 12 doubles, one triple, 13 home runs and 29 RBI in 95 games for the National League West champions. Hernández recorded 26 extra base hits and a .540 slugging percentage in just 211 at bats. Only Anaheim's Troy Glaus (207 AB, 18 HR) hit more home runs in the majors in 2004 among players with 215 or fewer at bats.

Hernández signed on with the Cleveland Indians for the 2005 to begin his second tenure with the team. He played in 84 games and hit .231 with six home runs and 31 runs batted in.

Before the 2006 season, Hernández signed a minor league contract with the Pirates that included an invitation to spring training, and an opportunity to compete for a spot on the team. After playing only 67 games for Pittsburgh, the Phillies purchased his contract from the Pirates on August 22, 2006. He became a free agent after the season.

Hernández returned to the Pirates organization on January 3, 2007. Unconditionally released on March 30, he signed with the Indianapolis Indians. In 99 games, he hit .242 with 13 home runs and 56 RBI.

Hernández set a Puerto Rican Winter League record with 20 home runs for Mayagüez during the 1997-1998 season.

=== Coaching career ===
Hernández has been a field coach in the Baltimore Orioles organization since 2010. Beginning with the Gulf Coast League Orioles for one season, he was promoted to the Delmarva Shorebirds in 2011, the Frederick Keys in 2012 and the Norfolk Tides in 2013. He served as a field coach for the Norfolk Tides in 2018 for a sixth year. In January 2019, Hernández was promoted to the Major League staff in Baltimore with the title "Major League coach". On October 4, 2021, it was announced that Hernández would assume a different role on the Orioles' staff. On October 11, 2024, the Orioles announced they would not bring back Hernández in 2025.

== Personal life ==
Hernández is the cousin of former Major League Baseball infielder Luis Figueroa and the son-in-law of Orlando Gómez, a former Major League Baseball coach and scout and minor league catcher and manager who, like Hernández, worked in the Orioles organization.
