= Brian Mallette =

American baseball player (born 1975)

- Relief pitcher
- Born: January 19, 1975 (age 51); Dublin, Georgia, U.S.
- Batted: Right Threw: Right

Professional debut
- MLB: April 12, 2002, for the Milwaukee Brewers
- NPB: April 29, 2003, for the Osaka Kintetsu Buffaloes

Last appearance
- MLB: May 23, 2002, for the Milwaukee Brewers
- NPB: May 4, 2003, for the Osaka Kintetsu Buffaloes

MLB statistics
- Innings pitched: 5
- Earned run average: 10.80
- Strikeouts: 5

NPB statistics
- Innings pitched: 5
- Earned run average: 14.40
- Strikeouts: 1
- Stats at Baseball Reference

Teams
- Milwaukee Brewers (2002); Osaka Kintetsu Buffaloes (2003)

Brian Drew Mallette (born January 19, 1975) is an American former professional baseball pitcher. He played part of one season in Major League Baseball for the Milwaukee Brewers in 2002, and one season in Nippon Professional Baseball for the Osaka Kintetsu Buffaloes.

Mallette was drafted by the Milwaukee Brewers in 1997, and he signed with the team on June 9. In 2002, Mallette was called up to the majors. He pitched five innings that season before being traded to the Los Angeles Dodgers in October. He began the 2003 season with the triple-A Las Vegas 51s, but pitched in just one game before being released. He was signed by the Buffaloes, and finished the season with them. In 2004, he returned to North America, pitching for the Louisville Bats in the Cincinnati Reds organization.

Before the 2005 season, Mallette signed a minor league contract with the Pittsburgh Pirates. On April 6, while in triple-A, he was suspended for 30 games after failing his second drug test. He was granted free agency in October, ending his professional career.

== See also ==
- List of Major League Baseball players suspended for performance-enhancing drugs
