= Robert Machado =

Venezuelan baseball player (born 1973)

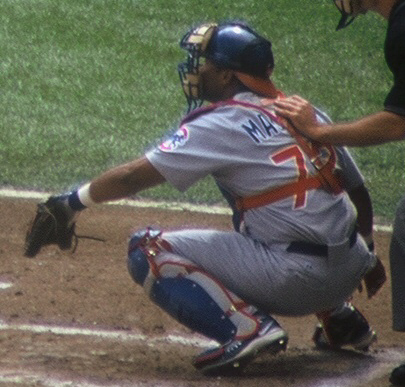
- Machado with the Chicago Cubs in 2001
- Catcher
- Born: June 3, 1973 (age 53); Puerto Cabello, Carabobo State, Venezuela
- Batted: Right Threw: Right

MLB debut
- July 24, 1996, for the Chicago White Sox

Last MLB appearance
- September 18, 2004, for the Baltimore Orioles

MLB statistics
- Batting average: .230
- Home runs: 11
- Runs batted in: 61
- Stats at Baseball Reference

Teams
- Chicago White Sox (1996–1998); Montreal Expos (1999); Seattle Mariners (2000); Chicago Cubs (2001–2002); Milwaukee Brewers (2002); Baltimore Orioles (2003–2004)

Robert Alexis Machado [ma-cha'-do] (born June 3, 1973) is a Venezuelan former catcher in Major League Baseball who played from 1998 through 2004 for the Chicago White Sox, Montreal Expos, Seattle Mariners, Chicago Cubs, Milwaukee Brewers and Baltimore Orioles. Listed at 6' 1", 205 lb., Machado batted and threw right-handed. He was born in Puerto Cabello, Carabobo.

== Career ==
Machado was a solid defensive catcher with a strong arm, but his little offensive value limited his effectiveness as an everyday player. His most productive season came in 2001 with the Cubs, when he posted a .997 of fielding percentage and threw out 13 of 39 baserunners who attempted to steal off him. He also had eight multi-hit games, including three over a six-game span, when he went 9-for-23 with three doubles and a home run.

On June 9, 2002, the Cubs traded Machado to the Brewers for previously heralded prospect Jackson Melián.

Machado also played in all or part of 13 Minor League seasons spanning 1991–2004, posting a .273 average with 70 homers and 392 RBI in 862 games.

In February 2009, Machado received a 15-game suspension for violating MLB-Minor League drug treatment and prevention program while trying to return to organized baseball.

== See also ==
- List of Major League Baseball players from Venezuela
