= 2013 Milwaukee Brewers season =

2013 Milwaukee Brewers
- League: National League
- Division: Central
- Ballpark: Miller Park
- City: Milwaukee, Wisconsin
- Record: 74–88 (.457)
- Divisional place: 4th
- Owners: Mark Attanasio
- General managers: Doug Melvin
- Managers: Ron Roenicke
- Television: Fox Sports Wisconsin (Brian Anderson, Bill Schroeder, Craig Coshun, Telly Hughes, Jeff Grayson, Sophia Minnaert); WYTU-LD (Hector Molina, Kevin Holden)
- Radio: 620 WTMJ (Bob Uecker, Joe Block, Andy Olivares)
- Stats: ESPN.com; Baseball Reference

The 2013 Milwaukee Brewers season was the 44th season for the Brewers in Milwaukee, the 16th in the National League, and 45th overall.

== Regular season ==
=== Season standings ===
==== National League Central ====
NL Central
Team	W	L	Pct.	GB	Home	Road
St. Louis Cardinals	97	65	.599	—	54‍–‍27	43‍–‍38
Pittsburgh Pirates	94	68	.580	3	50‍–‍31	44‍–‍37
Cincinnati Reds	90	72	.556	7	49‍–‍31	41‍–‍41
Milwaukee Brewers	74	88	.457	23	37‍–‍44	37‍–‍44
Chicago Cubs	66	96	.407	31	31‍–‍50	35‍–‍46

==== National League Wild Card ====
Division winners
Team	W	L	Pct.
St. Louis Cardinals	97	65	.599
Atlanta Braves	96	66	.593
Los Angeles Dodgers	92	70	.568

Wild Card teams (Top 2 teams qualify for postseason)
Team	W	L	Pct.	GB
Pittsburgh Pirates	94	68	.580	+4
Cincinnati Reds	90	72	.556	—
Washington Nationals	86	76	.531	4
Arizona Diamondbacks	81	81	.500	9
San Francisco Giants	76	86	.469	14
San Diego Padres	76	86	.469	14
Colorado Rockies	74	88	.457	16
New York Mets	74	88	.457	16
Milwaukee Brewers	74	88	.457	16
Philadelphia Phillies	73	89	.451	17
Chicago Cubs	66	96	.407	24
Miami Marlins	62	100	.383	28

=== Record vs. opponents ===
2013 National League record Source: MLB Standings Grid – 2013
Team	AZ	ATL	CHC	CIN	COL	LAD	MIA	MIL	NYM	PHI	PIT	SD	SF	STL	WSH	AL
Arizona	—	2–4	4–3	3–4	12–7	10–9	4–2	6–1	3–4	3–4	3–3	7–12	7–12	4–3	2–4	11–9
Atlanta	4–2	—	5–1	4–3	6–1	5–2	13–6	2–4	10–9	11–8	4–3	1–5	3–4	4–3	13–6	11–9
Chicago	3–4	1–5	—	5–14	3–3	1–6	4–3	6–13	3–3	3–3	7–12	3–4	4–3	7–12	3–4	13–7
Cincinnati	4–3	3–4	14–5	—	2–4	4–3	6–1	10–9	4–2	4–2	8–11	3–3	6–1	8–11	3–4	11–9
Colorado	7–12	1–6	3–3	4–2	—	10–9	3–4	4–2	3–4	3–4	4–2	12–7	9–10	3–4	3–4	5–15
Los Angeles	9–10	2–5	6–1	3–4	9–10	—	5–2	4–2	5–1	5–2	4–2	11–8	8–11	4–3	5–1	12–8
Miami	2–4	6–13	3–4	1–6	4–3	2–5	—	1–5	11–8	7–12	2–4	3–4	4–3	2–4	5–14	9–11
Milwaukee	1–6	4–2	13–6	9–10	2–4	2–4	5–1	—	4–3	5–2	7–12	3–4	5–2	5–14	3–4	6–14
New York	4–3	9–10	3–3	2–4	4–3	1–5	8–11	3–4	—	10–9	2–5	4–3	4–2	2–5	7–12	11–9
Philadelphia	4–3	8–11	3–3	2–4	4–3	2–5	12–7	2–5	9–10	—	3–4	4–2	3–3	2–5	8–11	7–13
Pittsburgh	3–3	3–4	12–7	11–8	2–4	2–4	4–2	12–7	5–2	4–3	—	3–4	4–3	10–9	4–3	15–5
San Diego	12–7	5–1	4–3	3–3	7–12	8–11	4–3	4–3	3–4	2–4	4–3	—	8–11	2–4	2–5	8–12
San Francisco	12–7	4–3	3–4	1–6	10–9	11–8	3–4	2–5	2–4	3–3	3–4	11–8	—	2–4	3–3	6–14
St. Louis	3–4	3–4	12–7	11–8	4–3	3–4	4–2	14–5	5–2	5–2	9–10	4–2	4–2	—	6–0	10–10
Washington	4–2	6–13	4–3	4–3	4–3	1–5	14–5	4–3	12–7	11–8	3–4	5–2	3–3	0–6	—	11–9

=== Game log ===
2013 game log
April (14–11) – home (9–5) – road (5–6)

#	Date	Opponent	Score	Win	Loss	Save	Attendance	Record
1	April 1	Rockies	5–4 (10)	**Henderson** (1–0)	Ottavino (0–1)		45,781	1–0
2	April 2	Rockies	4–8	Escalona (1–0)	**Gonzalez** (0–1)	Betancourt (1)	24,753	1–1
3	April 3	Rockies	3–7	Nicasio (1–0)	**Peralta** (0–1)		25,766	1–2
4	April 5	Diamondbacks	1–3	Miley (0–1)	**Badenhop** (0–1)	Putz (1)	24,623	1–3
5	April 6	Diamondbacks	2–9	Corbin (1–0)	**Fiers** (0–1)		30,115	1–4
6	April 7	Diamondbacks	7–8 (11)	Sipp (1–0)	**Axford** (0–1)	Bell (1)	37,733	1–5
7	April 8	@ Cubs	7–4	**Estrada** (1–0)	Jackson (0–2)	**Henderson** (1)	40,083	2–5
8	April 9	@ Cubs	3–6	Mármol (1–1)	**Axford** (0–2)	Fujikawa (2)	30,065	2–6
–	April 10	@ Cubs	7:05pm	PPD, RAIN; rescheduled for July 30				
9	April 12	@ Cardinals	0–2	Miller (2–0)	**Lohse** (0–1)	Boggs (2)	42,528	2–7
10	April 13	@ Cardinals	0–8	Wainwright (2–1)	**Gallardo** (0–1)		44,696	2–8
11	April 14	@ Cardinals	4–3 (10)	**Kintzler** (1–0)	Salas (0–2)	**Badenhop** (1)	42,645	3–8
12	April 16	Giants	10–8	**Kintzler** (2–0)	Zito (2–1)	**Henderson** (2)	29,075	4–8
13	April 17	Giants	4–3	**Henderson** (2–0)	Casilla (1–1)		29,362	5–8
14	April 18	Giants	7–2	**Gallardo** (1–1)	Cain (0–2)		29,161	6–8
15	April 19	Cubs	5–4	**Estrada** (2–0)	Samardzija (1–3)	**Henderson** (3)	28,346	7–8
16	April 20	Cubs	5–1	**Burgos** (1–0)	Jackson (0–3)		42,230	8–8
17	April 21	Cubs	4–2	**Peralta** (1–1)	Feldman (0–3)	**Henderson** (4)	37,123	9–8
18	April 22	@ Padres	7–1	**Lohse** (1–1)	Marquis (1–2)		18,643	10–8
19	April 23	@ Padres	6–3	**Gallardo** (2–1)	Richard (0–2)	**Henderson** (5)	19,560	11–8
20	April 24	@ Padres	1–2	Volquez (1–3)	**Estrada** (2–1)	Street (3)	17,205	11–9
21	April 26	@ Dodgers	5–7	Belisario (2–2)	**Gonzalez** (0–2)	League (7)	44,930	11–10
22	April 27	@ Dodgers	6–4	**Peralta** (2–1)	Guerrier (1–1)	Henderson (6)	50,224	12–10
23	April 28	@ Dodgers	0–2	Kershaw (3–2)	**Lohse** (1–2)	League (8)	49,003	12–11
24	April 29	Pirates	10–4	**Gallaro** (3–1)	Rodríguez (2–1)		21,255	13–11
25	April 30	Pirates	12–8	**Gorzelanny** (1–0)	Morris (0–1)		24,154	14–11

May (6–22) – home (3–12) – road (3–10)

#	Date	Opponent	Score	Win	Loss	Save	Attendance	Record
26	May 1	Pirates	4–6	Morris (1–1)	**Axford** (0–3)	Grilli (11)	26,079	14–12
27	May 2	Cardinals	5–6	Westbrook (2–1)	**Peralta** (2–2)	Mujica (7)	22,204	14–13
28	May 3	Cardinals	1–6	Miller (4–2)	**Lohse** (1–3)		40,068	14–14
29	May 4	Cardinals	6–7	Maness (1–0)	**Henderson** (2–1)	Mujica (8)	36,156	14–15
30	May 5	Cardinals	1–10	García (4–1)	**Estrada** (2–2)		38,620	14–16
31	May 7	Rangers	6–3	**Peralta** (3–2)	Grimm (2–2)	**Henderson** (7)	22,467	15–16
32	May 8	Rangers	1–4	Holland (3–2)	**Lohse** (1–4)	Nathan (9)	22,616	15–17
33	May 10	@ Reds	3–4	Simón (3–1)	**Gallardo** (3–2)	Chapman (8)	33,251	15–18
34	May 11	@ Reds	7–13	Latos (4–0)	**Burgos** (1–1)		41,678	15–19
35	May 12	@ Reds	1–5	Arroyo (3–4)	**Peralta** (3–3)		38,813	15–20
36	May 13	@ Pirates	5–1	**Estrada** (3–2)	Burnett (3–4)		11,872	16–20
37	May 14	@ Pirates	3–4 (12)	Mazzaro (2–0)	**Fiers** (0–2)		11,556	16–21
38	May 15	@ Pirates	1–3	Rodríguez (4–2)	**Gallardo** (3–3)	Grilli (16)	13,554	16–22
39	May 16	@ Pirates	1–7	Liriano (2–0)	**Burgos** (1–2)		16,434	16–23
40	May 17	@ Cardinals	6–7	García (5–2)	**Peralta** (3–4)	Mujica (12)	39,426	16–24
41	May 18	@ Cardinals	6–4 (10)	**Axford** (1–3)	Kelly (0–2)	**Henderson** (8)	42,410	17–24
42	May 19	@ Cardinals	2–4	Gast (2–0)	**Lohse** (1–5)	Mujica (13)	39,878	17–25
43	May 20	Dodgers	1–3	Kershaw (5–2)	**Gallardo** (3–4)		28,287	17–26
44	May 21	Dodgers	5–2	**Fiers** (1–2)	Greinke (2–1)	**Henderson** (9)	26,384	18–26
45	May 22	Dodgers	2–9	Ryu (5–2)	**Peralta** (3–5)		36,963	18–27
46	May 24	Pirates	2–1	**Estrada** (4–2)	Burnett (3–5)	**Rodríguez** (1)	33,874	19–27
47	May 25	Pirates	2–5	Locke (5–1)	**Fiers** (1–3)		40,410	19–28
48	May 26	Pirates	4–5	Rodríguez (6–2)	**Gallardo** (3–5)	Grilli (20)	44,626	19–29
49	May 27	Twins	3–6	Correia (5–4)	**Peralta** (3–6)	Perkins (10)	38,627	19–30
50	May 28	Twins	5–6 (14)	Pressly (2–0)	**Badenhop** (0–2)	Duensing (1)	24,415	19–31
51	May 29	@ Twins	1–4	Deduno (1–1)	**Estrada** (4–3)	Perkins (11)	31,359	19–32
52	May 30	@ Twins	6–8	Walters (2–0)	**Lohse** (1–6)	Burton (2)	32,688	19–33
53	May 31	@ Phillies	8–5	**Gallardo** (4–5)	Hamels (1–9)	**Rodríguez** (2)	37,420	20–33

June (12–15) – home (7–6) – road (5–9)

#	Date	Opponent	Score	Win	Loss	Save	Attendance	Record
54	June 1	@ Phillies	4–3	**Peralta** (4–6)	Cloyd (1–2)	**Rodríguez** (3)	41,114	21–33
55	June 2	@ Phillies	5–7	Lee (7–2)	**Fiers** (1–4)	Bastardo (1)	40,613	21–34
56	June 3	Athletics	2–10	Milone (6–5)	**Estrada** (4–4)		21,023	21–35
57	June 4	Athletics	4–3 (10)	**Axford** (2–3)	Neshek (1–1)		24,230	22–35
58	June 5	Athletics	1–6	Colón (7–2)	**Gallardo** (4–6)		25,912	22–36
59	June 6	Phillies	1–5	Cloyd (2–2)	**Peralta** (4–7)		21,581	22–37
60	June 7	Phillies	5–4	**Rodríguez** (1–0)	Horst (0–2)		31,417	23–37
61	June 8	Phillies	4–3	**Thornburg** (1–0)	Kendrick (6–4)	**Rodríguez** (4)	38,267	24–37
62	June 9	Phillies	9–1	**Lohse** (2–6)	Pettibone (3–2)		38,300	25–37
63	June 10	@ Marlins	6–1	**Gallardo** (5–6)	Nolasco (3–7)		13,259	26–37
64	June 11	@ Marlins	4–5	Qualls (2–0)	**Henderson** (2–2)	Cishek (7)	13,110	26–38
65	June 12	@ Marlins	10–1	**Fígaro** (1–0)	Slowey (2–6)		13,468	27–38
66	June 14	@ Reds	3–4 (10)	Simón (5–2)	**Badenhop** (0–3)		35,138	27–39
67	June 15	@ Reds	6–0	**Gallardo** (6–6)	Bailey (4–5)		37,519	28–39
68	June 16	@ Reds	1–5	Cueto (4–0)	**Peralta** (4–8)	Simón (1)	39,088	28–40
69	June 18	@ Astros	1–10	Lyles (4–1)	**Figaro** (1–1)		13,330	28–41
70	June 19	@ Astros	3–1	**Axford** (3–3)	Ambriz (1–4)	**Rodríguez** (5)	15,866	29–41
71	June 20	@ Astros	4–7 (10)	Ambriz (2–4)	**Gonzalez** (0–3)		17,803	29–42
72	June 21	Braves	2–0	**Peralta** (5–8)	Teherán (5–4)	**Henderson** (10)	32,594	30–42
73	June 22	Braves	2–0	**Badenhop** (1–3)	Hudson (4–7)	**Rodríguez** (6, career #300)	41,974	31–42
74	June 23	Braves	4–7	Maholm (8–6)	**Figaro** (1–2)	Kimbrel (21)	41,221	31–43
75	June 25	Cubs	9–3	**Lohse** (3–6)	Jackson (3–10)		30,172	32–43
76	June 26	Cubs	4–5	Feldman (7–6)	**Gallardo** (6–7)	Gregg (12)	28,061	32–44
77	June 27	Cubs	2–7	Garza (3–1)	**Peralta** (5–9)		31,792	32–45
78	June 28	@ Pirates	3–10	Cole (4–0)	**Hellweg** (0–1)	Reid (1)	36,875	32–46
79	June 29	@ Pirates	1–2	Liriano (7–3)	**Hand** (0–1)	Grilli (27)	38,438	32–47
80	June 30	@ Pirates	1–2 (14)	Watson (2–1)	**Rodríguez** (1–1)		35,351	32–48

July (14–14) – home (7–6) – road (7–8)

#	Date	Opponent	Score	Win	Loss	Save	Attendance	Record
81	July 1	@ Nationals	5–10	Zimmermann (12–3)	**Gallardo** (6–8)		24,889	32–49
82	July 2	@ Nationals	4–0	**Henderson** (3–2)	Storen (2–2)		24,897	33–49
83	July 3	@ Nationals	4–1	**Lohse** (4–6)	Detwiler (2–7)	**Rodríguez** (7)	28,920	34–49
84	July 4	@ Nationals	5–8	Storen (3–2)	**Gorzelanny** (1–1)	Soriano (22)	38,221	34–50
85	July 5	Mets	5–12	Wheeler (2–1)	**Hellweg** (0–2)	Edgin (1)	32,519	34–51
86	July 6	Mets	7–6	**Gallardo** (7–8)	Marcum (1–10)	**Rodríguez** (8)	31,619	35–51
87	July 7	Mets	1–2	Hefner (4–6)	**Gorzelanny** (1–2)	Parnell (15)	39,677	35–52
88	July 8	Reds	4–3	**Lohse** (5–6)	Bailey (5–7)	**Rodríguez** (9)	25,341	36–52
89	July 9	Reds	2–0	**Peralta** (6–9)	Cingrani (3–1)		25,369	37–52
90	July 10	Reds	2–6	Leake (8–4)	**Hellweg** (0–3)		35,239	37–53
91	July 11	@ Diamondbacks	3–5	Miley (6–7)	**Henderson** (3–3)	Ziegler (2)	17,531	37–54
92	July 12	@ Diamondbacks	1–2	Corbin (11–1)	**Gorzelanny** (1–3)	Hernandez (2)	19,681	37–55
93	July 13	@ Diamondbacks	4–5	Harris (2–0)	**Lohse** (5–7)	Ziegler (3)	33,566	37–56
94	July 14	@ Diamondbacks	5–1	**Peralta** (7–9)	Kennedy (3–6)		25,057	38–56
95	July 19	Marlins	2–0	**Lohse** (6–7)	Turner (3–2)	**Rodríguez** (10)	30,316	39–56
96	July 20	Marlins	6–0	**Gallardo** (8–8)	Eovaldi (2–1)		37,446	40–56
97	July 21	Marlins	1–0 (13)	**Axford** (4–3)	Webb (1–4)		30,073	41–56
98	July 22	Padres	3–5	Cashner (6–5)	**Gorzelanny** (1–4)	Street (17)	30,348	41–57
99	July 23	Padres	2–6	Ross (1–4)	**Hand** (0–2)		28,242	41–58
100	July 24	Padres	3–1	**Lohse** (7–7)	O'Sullivan (0–2)	**Henderson** (11)	25,551	42–58
101	July 25	Padres	8–10	Volquez (8–8)	**Gallardo** (8–9)	Street (18)	34,372	42–59
102	July 26	@ Rockies	3–8	Chatwood (7–3)	**Peralta** (7–10)		32,740	42–60
103	July 27	@ Rockies	7–5	**Gorzelanny** (2–4)	McHugh (0–2)	**Henderson** (12)	38,012	43–60
104	July 28	@ Rockies	5–6	Belisle (5–5)	**Axford** (4–4)	Brothers (7)	33,237	43–61
105	July 29	@ Cubs	5–0	**Kintzler** (3–0)	Strop (1–1)		32,848	44–61
106	July 30	@ Cubs	6–5	**Wooten** (1–0)	Russell (1–3)	**Henderson** (13)	34,996	45–61
107	July 30	@ Cubs	3–2	**Badenhop** (2–3)	Gregg (2–3)	**Henderson** (14)	31,638	46–61
108	July 31	@ Cubs	1–6	Jackson (7–11)	**Peralta** (7–11)		29,817	46–62

August (13–14) – home (4–8) – road (9–6)

#	Date	Opponent	Score	Win	Loss	Save	Attendance	Record
109	August 2	Nationals	1–4	Zimmermann (13–6)	**Figaro** (1–3)	Soriano (27)	34,824	46–63
110	August 3	Nationals	0–3	Haren (6–11)	**Hand** (0–3)	Soriano (28)	35,690	46–64
111	August 4	Nationals	8–5	**Axford** (5–4)	Abad (0–3)	**Henderson** (15)	35,055	47–64
112	August 5	@ Giants	2–4	Casilla (5–2)	**Axford** (5–5)	Romo (27)	42,217	47–65
113	August 6	@ Giants	3–1	**Peralta** (8–11)	Cain (7–7)	**Henderson** (16)	41,426	48–65
114	August 7	@ Giants	6–1	**Figaro** (2–3)	Bumgarner (11–7)		41,416	49–65
115	August 8	@ Giants	1–4	Lincecum (6–11)	**Hand** (0–4)		41,219	49–66
116	August 9	@ Mariners	10–5	**Lohse** (8–7)	Saunders (10–11)		34,827	50–66
117	August 10	@ Mariners	10–0	**Gorzelanny** (3–4)	Iwakuma (10–6)		46,027	51–66
118	August 11	@ Mariners	0–2	Hernández (12–5)	**Peralta** (8–12)	Farquhar (4)	25,390	51–67
119	August 13	@ Rangers	5–1	**Estrada** (5–4)	Ogando (5–4)	**Henderson** (17)	38,516	52–67
120	August 14	@ Rangers	4–5	Frasor (4–2)	**Axford** (5–6)	Nathan (36)	37,729	52–68
121	August 15	Reds	1–2	Cingrani (6–2)	**Lohse** (8–8)	Chapman (30)	36,076	52–69
122	August 16	Reds	7–6	**Axford** (6–6)	Chapman (3–5)		33,037	53–69
123	August 17	Reds	2–0	**Gallardo** (9–9)	Latos (12–4)	**Henderson** (18)	37,046	54–69
124	August 18	Reds	1–9	Bailey (8–10)	**Peralta** (8–13)		34,175	54–70
125	August 19	Cardinals	5–8	Wacha (2–0)	**Kintzler** (3–1)	Mujica (32)	32,972	54–71
126	August 20	Cardinals	6–3	**Lohse** (9–8)	Lynn (13–7)	**Henderson** (19)	38,093	55–71
127	August 21	Cardinals	6–8	Siegrist (2–1)	**Gorzelanny** (3–5)	Mujica (33)	37,028	55–72
128	August 23	@ Reds	6–4	**Wooten** (2–0)	Simón (5–4)	**Henderson** (20)	34,230	56–72
129	August 24	@ Reds	3–6	Arroyo (13–9)	**Axford** (6–7)	Chapman (33)	33,430	56–73
130	August 25	@ Reds	3–1	**Estrada** (6–4)	Reynolds (0–2)	**Henderson** (21)	33,743	57–73
131	August 27	@ Pirates	7–6	**Wooten** (3–0)	Morris (5–7)	**Henderson** (22)	23,801	58–73
132	August 28	@ Pirates	1–7	Morton (6–3)	**Gorzelanny** (3–6)		20,634	58–74
133	August 29	@ Pirates	4–0	**Gallardo** (10–9)	Cole (6–7)		23,747	59–74
134	August 30	Angels	0–5	Weaver (9–7)	**Peralta** (8–14)		32,340	59–75
135	August 31	Angels	5–6	De La Rosa (6–1)	**Henderson** (3–4)	Frieri (29)	28,175	59–76

September (15–12) – home (7–7) – road (8–5)

#	Date	Opponent	Score	Win	Loss	Save	Attendance	Record
136	September 1	Angels	3–5	Wilson (14–6)	**Wooten** (3–1)	Frieri (30)	29,733	59–77
137	September 2	Pirates	2–5	Morton (7–3)	**Thornburg** (1–1)	Melancon (10)	23,252	59–78
138	September 3	Pirates	3–4	Mazzaro (7–2)	**Henderson** (3–5)	Melancon (11)	25,558	59–79
139	September 4	Pirates	9–3	**Peralta** (9–14)	Liriano (15–7)		29,041	60–79
140	September 6	@ Cubs	5–8	Villanueva (5–8)	**Lohse** (9–9)	Gregg (30)	25,351	60–80
141	September 7	@ Cubs	5–3	**Hellweg** (1–3)	Arrieta (3–4)	**Henderson** (23)	34,929	61–80
142	September 8	@ Cubs	3–1	**Gallardo** (11–9)	Grimm (7–8)	**Henderson** (24)	27,802	62–80
143	September 10	@ Cardinals	2–4	Miller (13–9)	**Peralta** (9–15)		35,050	62–81
144	September 11	@ Cardinals	1–5	Rosenthal (2–3)	**Kintzler** (3–2)		35,134	62–82
145	September 12	@ Cardinals	5–3	**Thornburg** (2–1)	Kelly (8–4)	**Henderson** (25)	35,208	63–82
146	September 13	Reds	5–1	**Lohse** (10–9)	Latos (14–6)		39,665	64–82
147	September 14	Reds	3–7	Bailey (11–10)	**Hellweg** (1–4)	Chapman (36)	25,929	64–83
148	September 15	Reds	6–5	**Henderson** (4–5)	Duke (1–2)		26,725	65–83
149	September 16	Cubs	6–1	**Peralta** (10–15)	Jackson (8–16)		24,464	66–83
150	September 17	Cubs	4–3	**Henderson** (5–5)	Grimm (7–9)		22,506	67–83
151	September 18	Cubs	7–0	**Thornburg** (3–1)	Rusin (2–5)		24,632	68–83
152	September 19	Cubs	1–5	Arrieta (4–4)	**Lohse** (10–10)		21,625	68–84
153	September 20	Cardinals	6–7 (10)	Axford (7–7)	**Blazek** (0–1)	Martínez (1)	37,148	68–85
154	September 21	Cardinals	2–7	Lynn (14–10)	**Gallardo** (11–10)		35,008	68–86
155	September 22	Cardinals	6–4	**Peralta** (11–15)	Kelly (9–5)	**Henderson** (26)	27,389	69–86
156	September 23	@ Braves	5–0	**Estrada** (7–4)	Minor (13–8)		19,893	70–86
157	September 24	@ Braves	2–3	Kimbrel (4–3)	**Hand** (0–5)		22,605	70–87
158	September 25	@ Braves	4–0	**Lohse** (11–10)	Maholm (10–11)		19,558	71–87
159	September 26	@ Mets	4–2	**Fígaro** (3–3)	Gee (12–11)	**Henderson** (27)	21,350	72–87
160	September 27	@ Mets	4–2	**Gallardo** (12–10)	Torres (4–6)	**Henderson** (28)	25,276	73–87
161	September 28	@ Mets	4–2 (10)	**Hand** (1–5)	Atchison (3–3)	**Fígaro** (1)	29,326	74–87
162	September 29	@ Mets	2–3	Black (3–0)	**Kintzler** (3–3)	Francisco (1)	41,891	74–88

- Brewers win
- Brewers loss
- Postponement
- Bold: Brewers team member

=== Roster ===
2013 Milwaukee Brewers
**Roster**
**Pitchers**: 59 John Axford; 31 Burke Badenhop; 54 Michael Blazek; 46 Hiram Burgos; 41 Marco Estrada; 64 Michael Fiers; 45 Alfredo Fígaro; 49 Yovani Gallardo; 51 Mike Gonzalez; 32 Tom Gorzelanny; 48 Donovan Hand; 40 Johnny Hellweg; 29 Jim Henderson; 53 Brandon Kintzler; 26 Kyle Lohse; 38 Chris Narveson; 52 Jimmy Nelson; 60 Wily Peralta; 57 Francisco Rodríguez; 63 Tyler Thornburg; 47 Rob Wooten	**Catchers**: 20 Jonathan Lucroy; 12 Martín Maldonado; **Infielders**: 3 Yuniesky Betancourt; 14 Jeff Bianchi; 21 Juan Francisco; 2 Scooter Gennett; 11 Álex González; 11 Sean Halton; 50 Blake Lalli; 16 Aramis Ramírez; 9 Jean Segura; 23 Rickie Weeks	**Outfielders**: 7 Norichika Aoki; 8 Ryan Braun; 18 Khris Davis; 15 Caleb Gindl; 27 Carlos Gómez; 25 Josh Prince; 22 Logan Schafer	**Manager**: 10 Ron Roenicke; **Coaches**: 55 Marcus Hanel (bullpen catcher); 35 Garth Iorg (first base); 39 Rick Kranitz (pitching); 36 Jerry Narron (bench); 32 Johnny Narron (hitting); 6 Ed Sedar (third base); 31 John Shelby (coach); 85 Lee Tunnell (bullpen)

== Player stats ==
=== Batting ===
Note: G = Games played; AB = At bats; R = Runs; H = Hits; 2B = Doubles; 3B = Triples; HR = Home runs; RBI = Runs batted in; SB = Stolen bases; BB = Walks; AVG = Batting average; SLG = Slugging average

Player	G	AB	R	H	2B	3B	HR	RBI	SB	BB	AVG	SLG
Nori Aoki	155	597	80	171	20	3	8	37	20	55	.286	.370
Jean Segura	146	588	74	173	20	10	12	49	44	25	.294	.423
Carlos Gómez	147	536	80	152	27	10	24	73	40	37	.284	.506
Jonathan Lucroy	147	521	59	146	25	6	18	82	9	46	.280	.455
Yuniesky Betancourt	137	391	35	83	15	1	13	46	0	14	.212	.355
Rickie Weeks Jr.	104	350	40	73	20	1	10	24	7	40	.209	.357
Aramis Ramírez	92	304	43	86	18	0	12	49	0	36	.283	.461
Logan Schafer	134	298	29	63	15	3	4	33	7	25	.211	.322
Juan Francisco	89	240	26	53	10	1	13	32	0	25	.221	.433
Jeff Bianchi	100	236	22	56	8	1	1	25	4	11	.237	.292
Ryan Braun	61	225	30	67	14	2	9	38	4	27	.298	.498
Scooter Gennett	69	213	29	69	11	2	6	21	2	10	.324	.479
Martín Maldonado	67	183	13	31	7	1	4	22	0	13	.169	.284
Khris Davis	56	136	27	38	10	0	11	27	3	11	.279	.596
Caleb Gindl	57	132	17	32	7	2	5	14	2	20	.242	.439
Álex González	41	113	14	20	3	0	1	8	0	3	.177	.230
Sean Halton	42	101	9	24	4	0	4	17	0	5	.238	.396
Blake Lalli	16	24	1	3	0	0	0	2	0	0	.125	.125
Josh Prince	8	8	3	1	1	0	0	0	0	1	.125	.250
Pitcher totals	162	278	9	40	3	0	2	11	0	3	.144	.176
Team totals	162	5474	640	1381	238	43	157	610	142	407	.252	.398

=== Pitching ===
Note: W = Wins; L = Losses; ERA = Earned run average; G = Games pitched; GS = Games started; SV = Saves; IP = Innings pitched; H = Hits allowed; R = Runs allowed; ER = Earned runs allowed; BB = Walks allowed; SO = Strikeouts

Player	W	L	ERA	G	GS	SV	IP	H	R	ER	BB	SO
Kyle Lohse	11	10	3.35	32	32	0	198.2	196	78	74	36	125
Wily Peralta	11	15	4.37	32	32	0	183.1	187	107	89	73	129
Yovani Gallardo	12	10	4.18	31	31	0	180.2	180	92	84	66	144
Marco Estrada	7	4	3.87	21	21	0	128.0	109	56	55	29	118
Tom Gorzelanny	3	6	3.90	43	10	0	85.1	77	41	37	31	83
Brandon Kintzler	3	3	2.69	71	0	0	77.0	66	26	23	16	58
Alfredo Fígaro	3	3	4.14	33	5	1	74.0	77	41	34	15	54
Donovan Hand	1	5	3.69	31	7	0	68.1	71	29	28	21	37
Tyler Thornburg	3	1	2.03	18	7	0	66.2	53	17	15	26	48
Burke Badenhop	2	3	3.47	63	0	1	62.1	62	32	24	12	42
Jim Henderson	5	5	2.70	61	0	28	60.0	44	18	18	24	75
John Axford	6	7	4.45	62	0	0	54.2	62	29	27	23	54
Mike Gonzalez	0	3	4.68	75	0	0	50.0	58	28	26	25	60
Johnny Hellweg	1	4	6.75	8	7	0	30.2	40	30	23	6	9
Hiram Burgos	1	2	6.44	6	6	0	29.1	38	23	21	11	18
Rob Wooten	3	1	3.90	27	0	0	27.2	27	12	12	8	18
Francisco Rodríguez	1	1	1.09	25	0	10	24.2	17	3	3	9	26
Mike Fiers	1	4	7.25	11	3	0	22.1	28	20	18	6	15
Jimmy Nelson	0	0	0.90	4	1	0	10.0	2	1	1	5	8
Michael Blazek	0	1	3.86	7	0	0	7.0	6	4	3	3	4
Chris Narveson	0	0	0.00	2	0	0	2.0	1	0	0	1	0
Team totals	74	88	3.84	162	162	40	1442.2	1401	687	615	466	1125

== Farm system ==
The Brewers' farm system consisted of seven minor league affiliates in 2013.

Level	Team	League	Manager
Triple-A	Nashville Sounds	Pacific Coast League	Mike Guerrero
Double-A	Huntsville Stars	Southern League	Darnell Coles
Class A-Advanced	Brevard County Manatees	Florida State League	Joe Ayrault
Class A	Wisconsin Timber Rattlers	Midwest League	Matt Erickson
Rookie	Helena Brewers	Pioneer League	Tony Diggs
Rookie	AZL Brewers	Arizona League	Néstor Corredor
Rookie	DSL Brewers	Dominican Summer League	—
