= Rob Wooten =

American baseball player (born 1985)

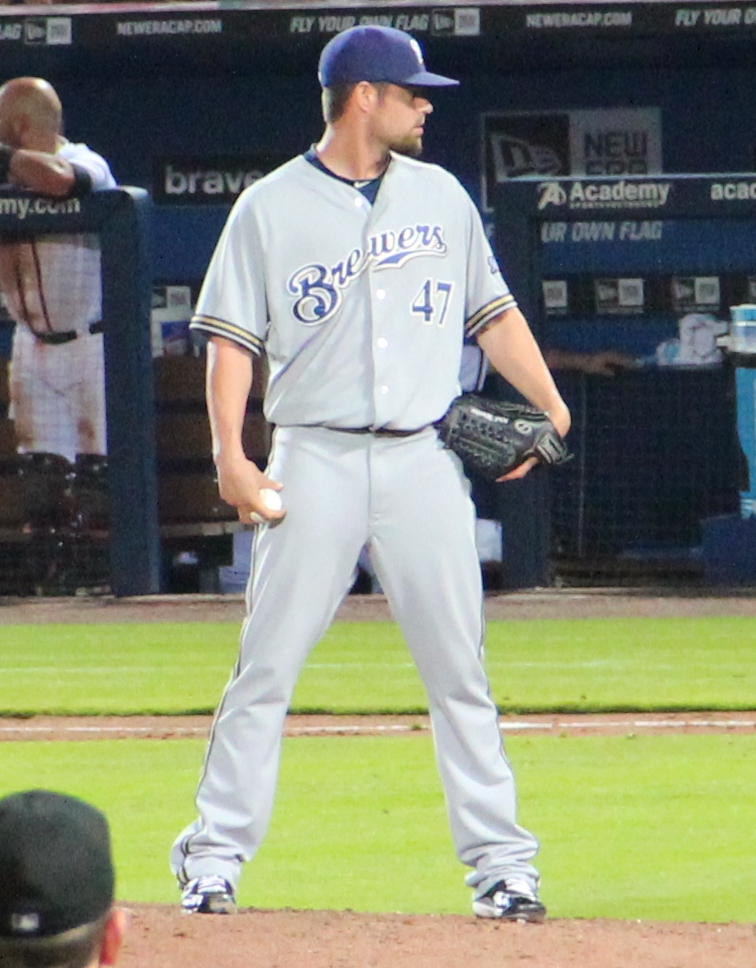
- Wooten with the Milwaukee Brewers
- Pitcher
- Born: July 21, 1985 (age 41); Goldsboro, North Carolina, U.S.
- Batted: Right Threw: Right

MLB debut
- July 26, 2013, for the Milwaukee Brewers

Last MLB appearance
- May 7, 2015, for the Milwaukee Brewers

MLB statistics
- Win–loss record: 4–5
- Earned run average: 5.03
- Strikeouts: 53
- Stats at Baseball Reference

Teams
- Milwaukee Brewers (2013–2015)

Robert Davis Wooten (born July 21, 1985) is an American former Major League Baseball (MLB) pitcher who played for the Milwaukee Brewers from 2013 to 2015.

== College career ==
Wooten earned a bachelor's degree in exercise and sport science from the University of North Carolina. During his playing days at North Carolina, the team advanced to three straight College World Series appearances from 2006 to 2008. In 2007, he played collegiate summer baseball with the Chatham A's of the Cape Cod Baseball League.

== Professional career ==
=== Milwaukee Brewers ===
Wooten made his major league debut for the Brewers against the Colorado Rockies, pitching a scoreless inning. He emerged as a second setup man to closer Jim Henderson, along with Brandon Kintzler. Wooten usually pitched in the 7th inning, Kintzler in the 8th, and Henderson closed it out in the 9th.

Wooten didn't make the team out of spring training, but was recalled after Henderson (who was no longer the closer, but a setup man to Francisco Rodriguez) was placed on the DL with right shoulder inflammation.

Wooten was outrighted off the Brewers roster on May 28, 2015.

=== Atlanta Braves ===
Wooten signed a minor league contract with the Atlanta Braves on January 13, 2016. On May 3, Wooten was released by the Braves, but he re–signed with the Braves on a new minor league contract on May 22. In 35 appearances for the Triple–A Gwinnett Braves, he compiled a 3–5 record and 3.58 ERA with 60 strikeouts across 73 innings pitched. Wooten elected free agency following the season on November 7.

=== Cincinnati Reds ===
On December 20, 2016, Wooten signed a minor league contract with the Cincinnati Reds. He made 6 starts for the Triple–A Louisville Bats in 2017, registering a 1–3 record and 6.94 ERA with 26 strikeouts across 23 1/3 innings pitched.

Wooten spent the 2018 campaign with the rookie–level Arizona League Reds, also playing in one game for Triple–A Louisville. In 7 games for the AZL Reds, he recorded an 8.16 ERA with 15 strikeouts across 14 1/3 innings pitched. Wooten elected free agency following the season on November 3, 2018.

On January 4, 2019, Wooten re-signed with Cincinnati on a minor league contract. In 9 starts split between Louisville and the Double–A Chattanooga Lookouts, he compiled a 1–3 record and 6.25 ERA with 30 strikeouts over 36 innings pitched. Wooten did not play in a game in 2020 due to the cancellation of the minor league season because of the COVID-19 pandemic. Wooten announced his retirement from professional baseball on April 18, 2020.

== Coaching career ==
On January 14, 2021, Wooten was announced as the pitching coach for the Chattanooga Lookouts, the Double-A affiliate of the Cincinnati Reds.

On May 11, 2022, Wooten was hired to serve as the head baseball coach at Grace Christian School in Sanford, North Carolina.

== Personal life ==
Wooten is a Christian.
