= Brandon Kintzler =

American baseball player (born 1984)

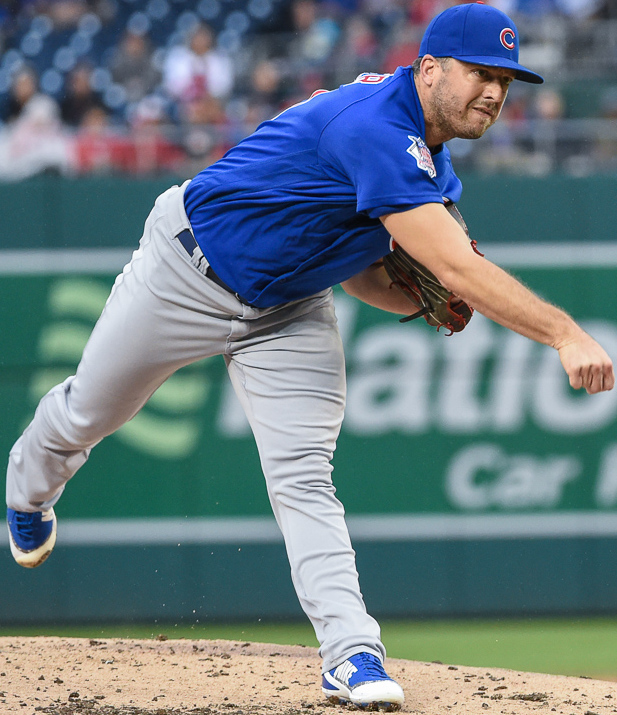
- Kintzler with the Chicago Cubs in 2018
- Pitcher
- Born: August 1, 1984 (age 42); Las Vegas, Nevada, U.S.
- Batted: Right Threw: Right

MLB debut
- September 10, 2010, for the Milwaukee Brewers

Last MLB appearance
- July 29, 2021, for the Philadelphia Phillies

MLB statistics
- Win–loss record: 24–24
- Earned run average: 3.50
- Strikeouts: 335
- Saves: 61
- Stats at Baseball Reference

Teams
- Milwaukee Brewers (2010–2015); Minnesota Twins (2016–2017); Washington Nationals (2017–2018); Chicago Cubs (2018–2019); Miami Marlins (2020); Philadelphia Phillies (2021)

Career highlights and awards
- All-Star (2017)

Brandon Lee Kintzler (born August 1, 1984) is an American former professional baseball relief pitcher. He played in Major League Baseball (MLB) for the Milwaukee Brewers, Minnesota Twins, Washington Nationals, Chicago Cubs, Miami Marlins, and Philadelphia Phillies.

Kintzler was born in Las Vegas, Nevada, and began playing baseball with a traveling youth team. After going undrafted out of Palo Verde High School, he spent one year apiece at Pasadena City College and Dixie State College, leading the latter to a national championship in 2004. The Padres selected Kintzler in the 40th round of the 2004 MLB draft, and he spent two years in the team's farm system before sustaining a season-ending shoulder injury. Kintzler took one year off from baseball and moved back home to undergo shoulder surgery before he was recruited to the independent Winnipeg Goldeyes in 2007. Two years later, Kintzler requested a trade to the St. Paul Saints, believing it would give him a better opportunity to reach MLB.

The Brewers offered Kintzler a contract in 2009 after watching him pitch at the American Association All-Star Game for the Saints, and he made his MLB debut in September 2010. Kintzler's five-season tenure with the Brewers was hindered by injury, first a stress fracture in his elbow in 2011, followed by a patellar tendon rupture in 2014, and he became a free agent at the conclusion of the 2015 season. Kintzler accepted a minor league contract with the Twins that December, and became the team's closer in 2016 after the departure of Kevin Jepsen. Kintzler continued to close for the team in 2017 after Glen Perkins experienced a shoulder injury, and he received an All-Star selection in 2017.

Kintzler joined the Nationals in 2017, where he served as the seventh-inning reliever before suffering a forearm flexor strain in June 2018. The Nationals traded him to the Cubs, and, after a disappointing 2018, he tweaked his pitching delivery and improved in 2019. Kintzler signed a one-year contract with the Marlins in 2020, and helped lead the team to the postseason by throwing shutout final innings in both Wild Card Games against the Cubs. In 2021, Kintzler signed a contract with the Phillies.

Kintzler is considered by baseball journalists to be the most successful 40th-round draft pick in MLB history. His signature pitch is a sinker that he developed after shoulder surgery limited the speed of his four-seam fastball.

== Early life ==
Kintzler was born in Las Vegas, Nevada on August 1, 1984. At the age of four, his neighborhood bicycle stunts caught the attention of reporter Colin Cowherd. Between the ages of 10 and 12, Kintzler played for the Vegas Yard Dawgs, a traveling youth baseball team. He went on to play baseball at Palo Verde High School in Las Vegas.

Undrafted out of high school, Kintzler chose to attend Pasadena City College (PCC). In his one season with the PCC baseball team in 2003, he was an All-South Coast Conference first-team selection, with a 5–3 win–loss record and 3.83 earned run average (ERA) in 106 innings pitched. Additionally, he pitched two complete game shutouts and led the team in strikeouts, with 72. The following year, he attended Dixie State College, where he posted a 9–1 record and 2.30 ERA in 12 starts, and helped led the team to the 2004 NJCAA National Baseball Championship. In 2015, Dixie State inducted Kintzler into their Athletic Hall of Fame and retired his No. 3 jersey.

== Minor and independent league career ==
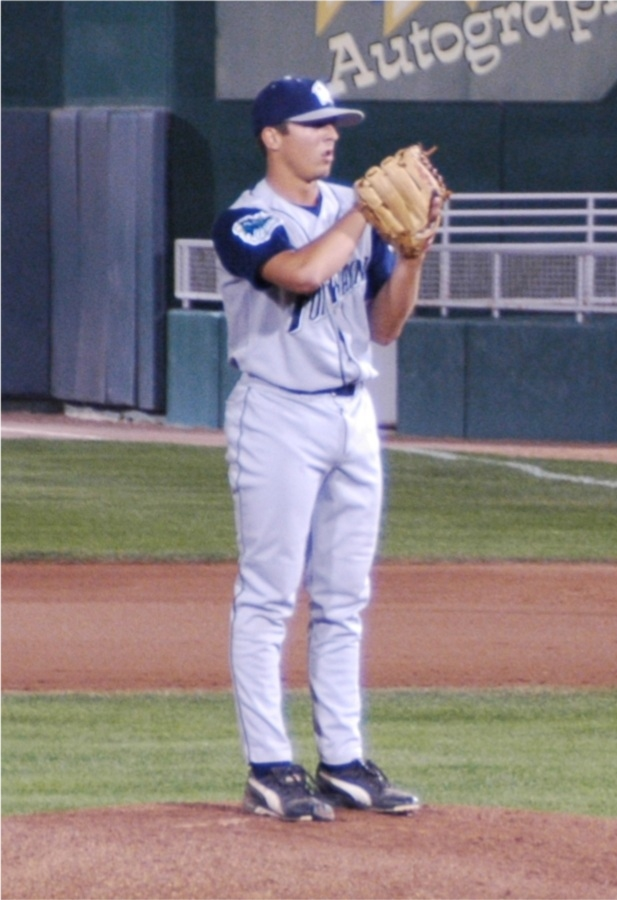
Kintzler with the Fort Wayne Wizards in 2005

=== Minor league system (2004–2005) ===
Kintzler was selected twice in a row in the 40th round of the Major League Baseball draft. He was first chosen by the New York Yankees in 2003, but chose not to sign. The next year, he was selected by the San Diego Padres. He spent parts of the 2004 and 2005 seasons with the Class A-Short Season Eugene Emeralds of the Northwest League, and also made appearances with the Rookie Arizona League Padres and the Class A Fort Wayne Wizards. Kintzler suffered a torn glenoid labrum in the 2005 season, and the Padres released him at the end of spring training in 2006. Rather than pitch that year, Kintzler instead moved back to Las Vegas, received shoulder surgery, and worked at Cold Stone Creamery, which he joked, "[g]ives you a strong wrist".

=== Independent leagues (2007–2009) ===
In 2007, Kintzler signed with the Winnipeg Goldeyes of the independent Northern League. Goldeyes manager Rick Forney recruited Kintzler after "look[ing] up his numbers on Baseball Reference just like everyone else". The shoulder surgery limited his four-seam fastball to 86 mph (138 km/h), and Kintzler worked with Greg Maddux to develop a two-seam sinker. In his first season, Kintzler pitched to a 5–2 record and 4.07 ERA in 77 innings. The next year, he asked the Goldeyes to use him as a starting pitcher rather than as a reliever. That season, Kintzler pitched 19 starts and 112 1/3 innings. In his two seasons with the Goldeyes, Kintzler posted a 4.41 ERA in 49 games.

In the offseason, Kintzler requested a trade to the St. Paul Saints of the American Association, believing that the team gave him a better chance of making the major leagues. While playing with the Saints in 2009, Kintzler was offered the role of former Oakland Athletics pitcher Tim Hudson in the film Moneyball. He turned down the role in order to start the American Association All-Star Game, where he struck out five of six batters he faced.

== Major league career ==
=== Milwaukee Brewers (2010–2015) ===
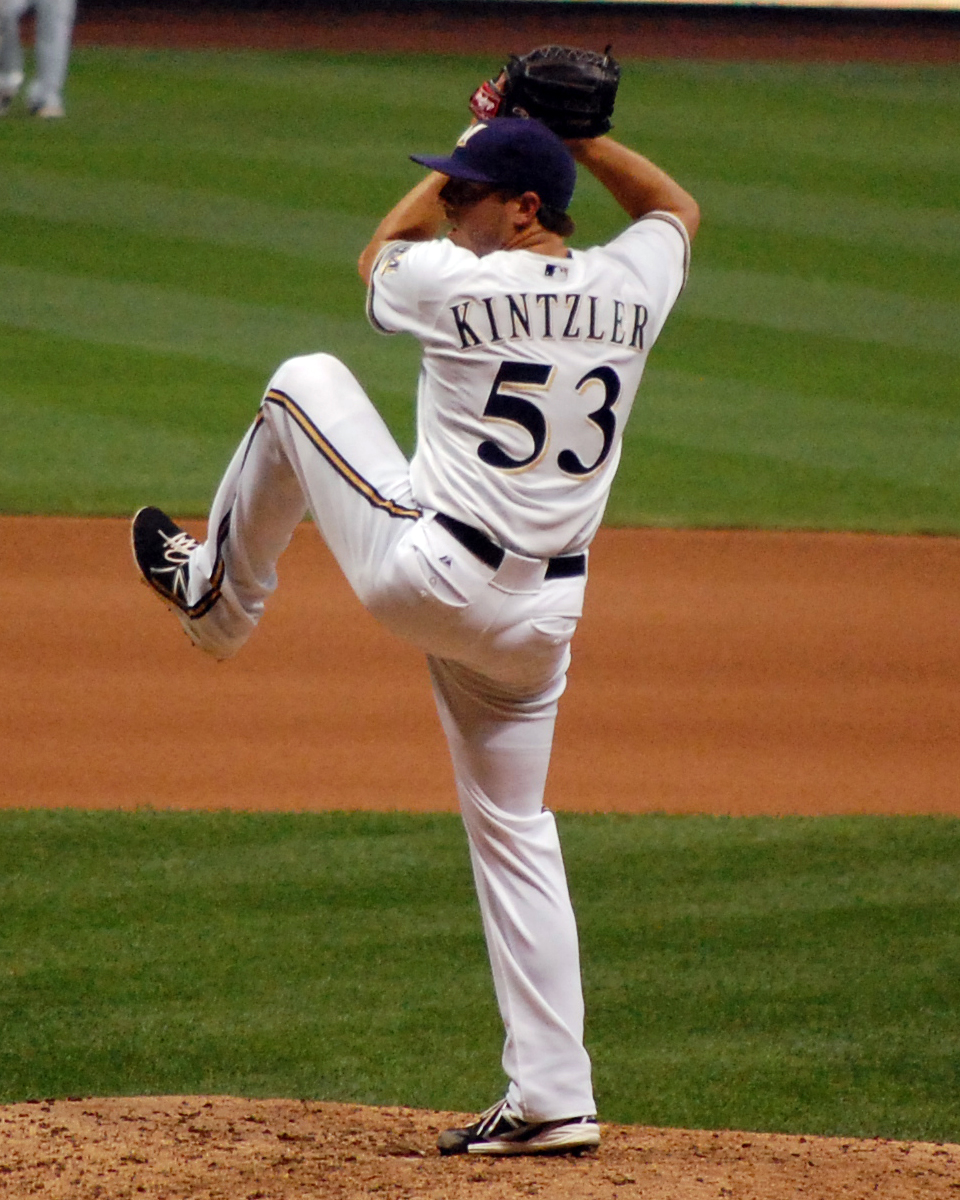
Kintzler with the Milwaukee Brewers in 2013

Kintzler signed a minor league contract with the Milwaukee Brewers on July 24, 2009, the day after his All-Star appearance. Brewers scout Tim Collinsworth had attended the game, and told the Brewers, "I got a pitcher here who can go right to Class AA." Kintzler spent the remainder of the 2009 season with the Double-A Huntsville Stars, pitching to a 1–2 record and 4.54 ERA in nine appearances. Beginning 2010 with Huntsville as well, he went 1–0 with a 0.40 ERA in 20 appearances and converting all 10 save opportunities. That June, Kintzler was promoted to the Triple-A Nashville Sounds, with whom he went 3–0 with a 2.36 ERA in 22 games. After being promoted to the Brewers as a September call-up, Kintzler made his major league debut on September 10, 2010, pitching 1 1/3 innings in a 4–0 loss to the Chicago Cubs. In seven appearances and 7 1/3 innings with the Brewers that year, Kintzler posted a 0–1 record and 7.36 ERA.

After starting the 2011 season with the Brewers, Kintzler was placed on the disabled list on May 14, suffering from what was originally believed to be tendinitis in his triceps. It was later revealed that he had a stress fracture in his elbow, an injury which required surgery to insert a screw into the joint. The injury ended his season after only nine relief appearances, in which he posted a 3.68 ERA. He planned to return to the Brewers in 2012 but began experiencing pain during batting practice on March 9 and had to be shut down. Kintzler started the year on the disabled list and was designated for assignment on June 28 while still out with the injury. After going unclaimed on waivers, Kintzler was reassigned to the minor leagues. He spent time with the Class-A Advanced Brevard County Manatees, Huntsville, and Nashville before being called back up to the Brewers in September, where he posted a 3–0 record and 3.78 ERA in 14 games. Kintzler finished the season with a 0–4 record and a 2.87 ERA in 45 combined minor league appearances and 53 1/3 innings.

2013 was a breakout season for Kintzler, who served as the primary setup man for closer Jim Henderson. He posted a 2.69 ERA in 71 relief appearances that season, retired 52 of the first batters he faced, and stranded 16 out of 21 inherited runners. Despite starting the 2014 with five scoreless appearances, Kintzler experienced shoulder discomfort and was placed on the disabled list on April 12. In his 15-day absence, Henderson, Tyler Thornburg, and Will Smith filled his eighth-inning role. He made 64 appearances that season, posting a 3.24 ERA in 58 1/3 innings.

Kintzler began to suffer knee pain in 2014, but avoided mentioning it until the conclusion of the Brewers season, when he discovered that he had suffered a partial patellar tendon rupture. He underwent surgery for the injury in October 2014, and began the 2015 season with the Class-A Colorado Springs Sky Sox. He missed two months of the season due to the injury and spent most of his time pitching in the minors, where he went 1–1 with a 4.43 ERA in 20 games. Appearing in only seven games for the Brewers and posting a 6.43 ERA, Kintzler became a free agent at the conclusion of the 2015 season.

=== Minnesota Twins (2016–2017) ===
Kintzler joined the Minnesota Twins on December 17, 2015, accepting a minor league contract. He began the 2016 season with the Triple-A Rochester Red Wings, pitching to a 1.93 ERA in his final seven minor-league appearances. When the Los Angeles Dodgers claimed Casey Fien off of waivers, Kintzler was promoted to the 40-man roster on May 7. On June 8, 2016, Kintzler was asked to close for the Twins, pitching the ninth inning of a 7–5 win over the Miami Marlins. The next day, regular closer Kevin Jepsen was released from the team following a disappointing performance, and the Twins announced that Kintzler would share the final-inning position with Fernando Abad. The team later appointed Glen Perkins to the closing role, but when Perkins suffered a torn labrum, Kintzler was once again called upon to fill in. He made 54 appearances for the Twins, posting a 3.15 ERA and converting 17 saves in 20 attempts.

The Twins signed Kintzler to a one-year deal on January 13, 2017. With Perkins beginning the 2017 MLB season on the 60-day disabled list as he recovered from shoulder surgery, the Twins named Kintzler as their closer. On July 6, Kintzler was named to the American League roster for the 2017 All-Star Game. He appeared in the bottom of the fifth inning and retired all three batters he faced. At the time of the All-Star break, Kintzler had posted a 2.35 ERA and was leading the American League with 23 saves.

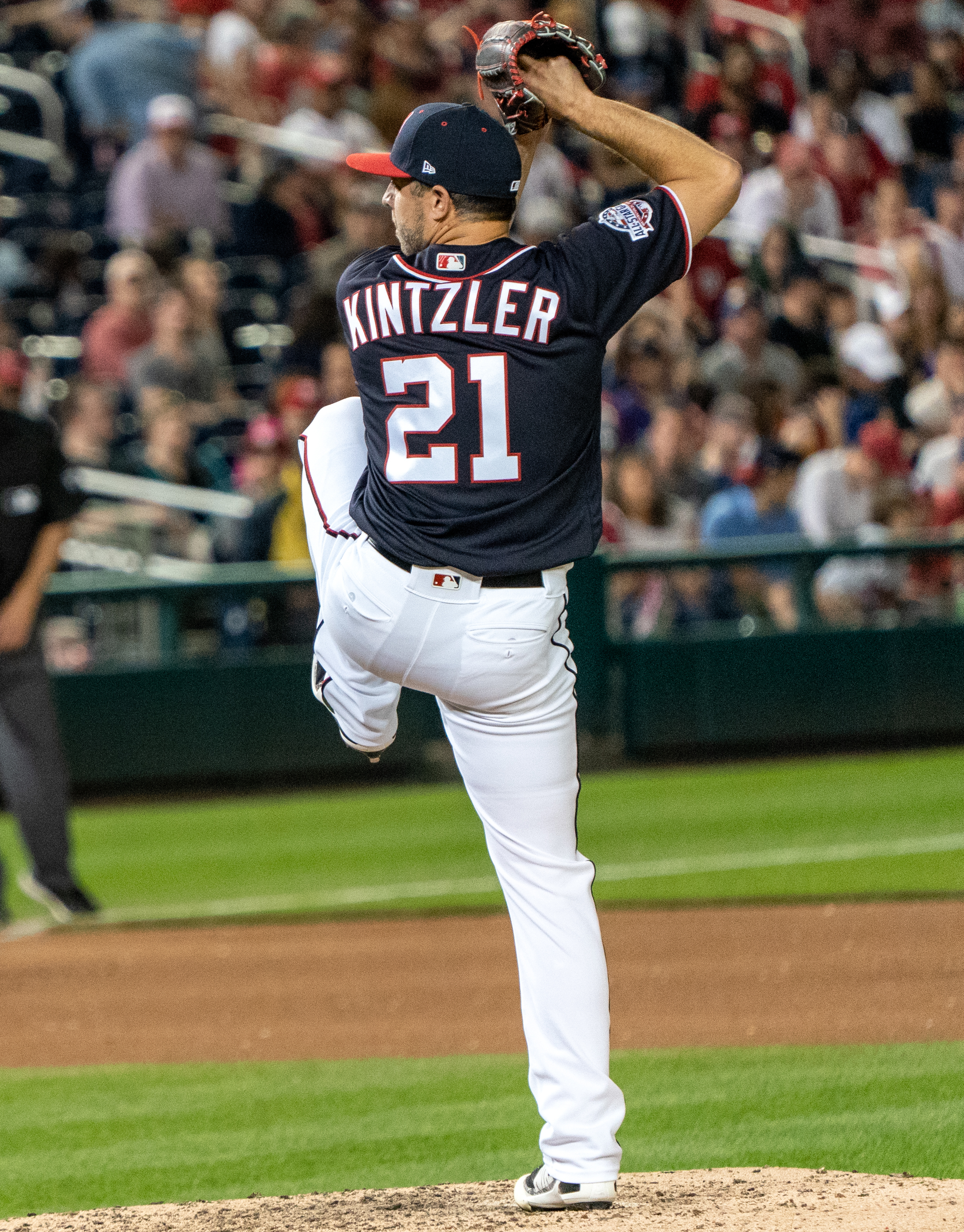
Kintzler with the Washington Nationals in 2018

=== Washington Nationals (2017–2018) ===
On July 31, 2017, the Twins traded Kintzler to the Washington Nationals in exchange for minor league pitcher Tyler J. Watson. Kintzler served as the club's seventh-inning reliever, setting up for Ryan Madson and Sean Doolittle in the eighth and ninth, respectively. In the remainder of the regular season, Kintzler recorded only one save but posted a 3.46 ERA in 26 innings with the Nationals. Kintzler made three appearances in the 2017 National League Division Series (NLDS). He gave up one run in each of his last two outings, and was credited with the Game 3 loss to the Chicago Cubs. The Cubs ultimately won the series 3–2, eliminating the Nationals from the playoffs.

Kintzler signed a two-year contract with the Nationals on December 21, 2017. He left the mound in the eighth inning of a June 9 game against the San Francisco Giants with forearm tightness, and missed most of the month with a forearm flexor strain. That season, Kintzler posted a 3.59 ERA in 42 2/3 innings with the Nationals. On July 31, 2018, the Nationals traded Kintzler to the Chicago Cubs in exchange for Jhon Romero, partly because the Nationals wanted to make Wander Suero their closer. Shortly after his departure, rumors emerged that Nationals general manager Mike Rizzo traded Kintzler after the pitcher circulated unflattering stories about Dave Martinez and the Nationals' clubhouse. Rizzo denied the claims and said that the trade was financially motivated.

=== Chicago Cubs (2018–2019) ===
After acquiring Kintzler from the Nationals, Cubs manager Joe Maddon praised the pitcher, calling him a "very durable kind of guy [...] Good sink. Puts the ball on the ground." Kintzler struggled with the Cubs in 2018, allowing 14 runs and posting a 7.00 ERA in 18 innings. He admitted that his struggles were largely mental, telling NBC Sports Chicago that, "I feel like when I came over, I tried to be perfect. And usually I'm more of a guy that is in full-on attack mode." Between the Nationals and the Cubs, Kintzler finished 2018 with a 3–3 record, 4.60 ERA, and 43 strikeouts in 70 games and 60 2/3 innings.

Kintzler returned to the Cubs in 2019 with an improved approach to the mound, recording a 2.29 ERA in his first 19 appearances of the season. He credited pitching coach Tommy Hottovy for the turnaround, saying that Hottovy visited his home during the offseason and suggested a few tweaks to his pitching delivery. Serving as a setup man for the Cubs, Kintzler pitched in 62 games and posted a 2.68 ERA. He was placed on the 10-day injured list in August with a sore pectoral, and missed a handful of games in September due to an oblique strain. As a result, his ERA after the All-Star break was nearly double that of his early-season statistics, going from 1.98 in his first 37 games of the season to 3.92 in the last 25.

=== Miami Marlins (2020) ===
On February 3, 2020, Kintzler signed a one-year, $3.25 million contract with the Miami Marlins. After the Marlins beat the Philadelphia Phillies 5–2 on the July 24 Opening Day game, NBC Sports Philadelphia analyst Ricky Bottalico referred to the team as "bottom feeders", a label that Kintzler embraced throughout the season, saying, "I don't care if we're bottom feeders. I want to thank Ricky Bottalico for that motivation in opening weekend in Philadelphia by the way." Kintzler played a critical role in the Marlin's postseason run, throwing scoreless final innings in both Wild Card Games against the Cubs. In the 2020 season, which was shortened to 60 games due to the COVID-19 pandemic, Kintzler led the Marlins in saves with 12, and pitched to a 2.22 ERA in 24 1/3 innings with the Marlins.

=== Philadelphia Phillies (2021) ===
On February 10, 2021, Kintzler signed a minor league contract with the Philadelphia Phillies, a deal that included an invitation to spring training. On March 26, Kintzler and outfielder Matt Joyce were added to the Phillies' Opening Day roster. Kintzler debuted with the Phillies on April 5, 2021, taking over for starting pitcher Matt Moore in the fourth inning of an eventual 5–3 rout over the New York Mets. After posting an 8.50 ERA in his first 20 appearances, Kintzler was placed on the disabled list in June with a strained neck. He attributed the injury to the COVID-19 vaccine, which he had received during the first week of the season, and revealed that his neck had been in pain for the first six weeks of the season, and had in turn caused back pain. When projected starter Aaron Nola was scratched two hours before a game against the Boston Red Sox on July 11, 2021, Kintzler was called upon to start a bullpen game for the Phillies. The Phillies designated Kintzler for assignment on July 30, the MLB trade deadline. He was subsequently released from his contract into free agency on August 2.

=== San Diego Padres (2022) ===
On August 19, 2022, Kintzler signed a minor league contract with the San Diego Padres. In 7 games for the Triple-A El Paso Chihuahuas, he struggled to a 22.85 ERA with 3 strikeouts across 4 1/3 innings pitched. Kintzler elected free agency following the season on November 10.

== Pitcher profile ==
Kintzler is considered by several baseball journalists, including Andrew Simon from MLB.com and Kyle Glaser from Baseball America, to be the most successful 40th-round draft pick in MLB history. He is best known for his sinking fastball, a pitch that he began throwing after shoulder surgery limited the speed of his four-seam fastball. Cubs teammate Pedro Strop referred to the pitch as "one of the best that I've seen". Between 2016 and 2018, Kintzler threw the sinker for 80% of his pitches; in 2019, it made up 75%. His average pitch velocity of 92.6 mph (149.0 km/h) dropped to 91.3 mph (146.9 km/h) in 2020, which he attributed to the unusual nature of the season. Kintzler's other pitches are an 88 mph (142 km/h) changeup and 87 mph (140 km/h) slider.

== Personal life ==
Kintzler met his wife, Melissa, while playing with the Goldeyes, and the two married at a drive-through chapel in Las Vegas. Their first child, Knox, was born in late 2015. His daughter was born in December 2017, shortly before Kintzler signed his contract with the Nationals.

While playing with the Twins, Kintzler gained the nickname "Salt". He explains the origin of the name as such: "Anyone's salty when they're in Triple-A, so I just kind of had an edge." His entrance music is "Lose Yourself" by Eminem. He has compared the lyrics to his time in the MLB, saying, "It's about getting opportunity [...] I know those opportunities for me don't come very much, so the second the Twins were willing to give me a chance to close, you've got to take it and run with it."
