= Tyler Thornburg =

American baseball player (born 1988)

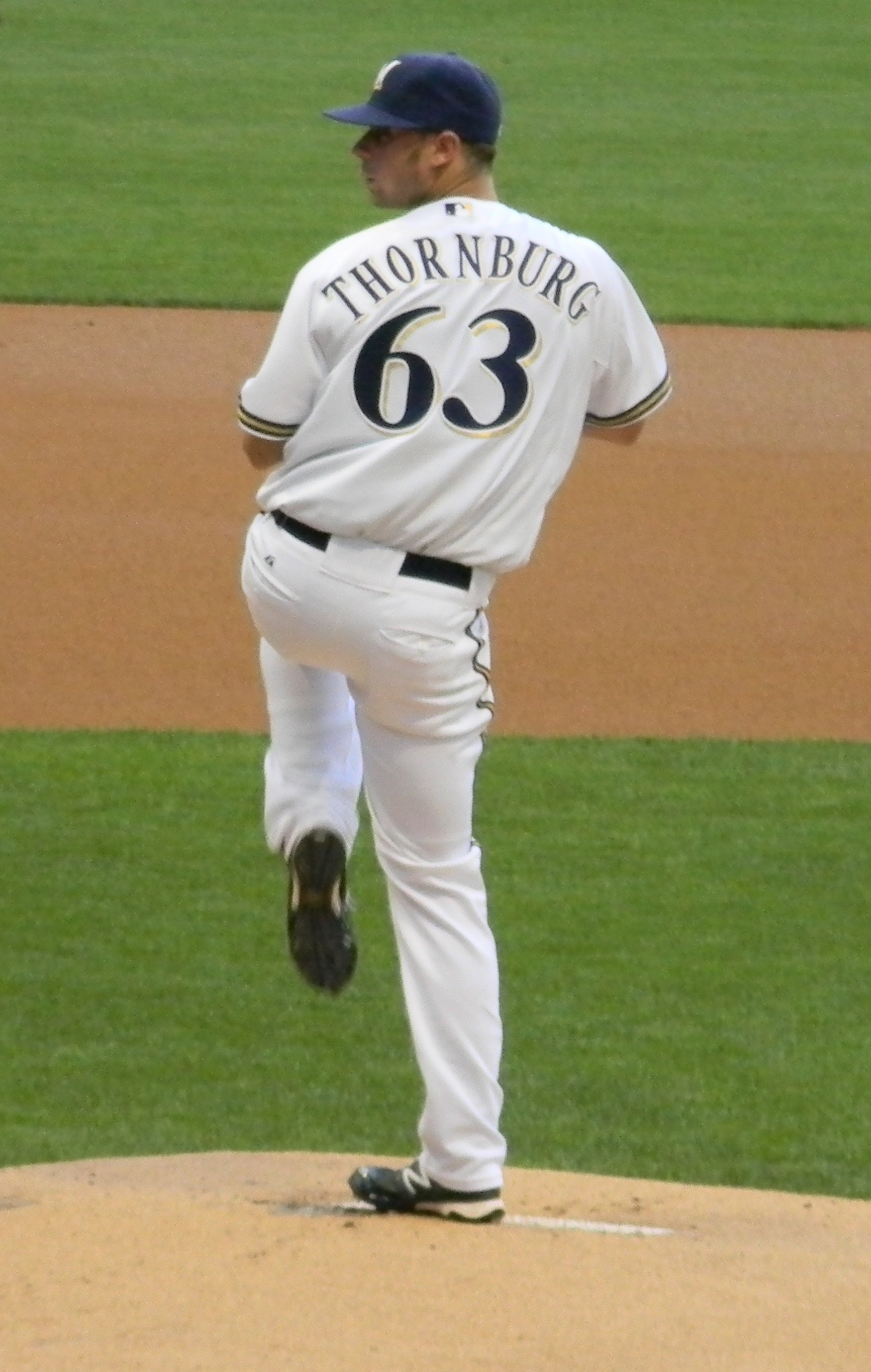
- Thornburg with the Milwaukee Brewers in 2012
- Pitcher
- Born: September 29, 1988 (age 38); Houston, Texas, U.S.
- Batted: Right Threw: Right

MLB debut
- June 19, 2012, for the Milwaukee Brewers

Last MLB appearance
- June 30, 2022, for the Minnesota Twins

MLB statistics
- Win–loss record: 16–10
- Earned run average: 3.46
- Strikeouts: 287
- Stats at Baseball Reference

Teams
- Milwaukee Brewers (2012–2016); Boston Red Sox (2018–2019); Cincinnati Reds (2020); Atlanta Braves (2022); Minnesota Twins (2022)

Tyler Michael Thornburg (born September 29, 1988) is an American former professional baseball pitcher. He played in Major League Baseball (MLB) for the Milwaukee Brewers, Boston Red Sox, Cincinnati Reds, Atlanta Braves and Minnesota Twins. He serves as a pitching coach in the Brewers' minor league organization.

== Early life ==
At the age of 12, Thornburg played as an outfielder in little league baseball for the Sandy Springs All-Stars, who won the Georgia state championship, and reached the 2001 Southeast Regional final of the Little League World Series.

== Amateur career ==
Thornburg attended Riverwood High School in Sandy Springs, Georgia, where he played for the school's baseball team. He then enrolled in Charleston Southern University, where he played college baseball for the Buccaneers, a member of the Big South Conference within NCAA Division I. With the Buccaneers, Thornburg played as a pitcher and outfielder. In the summer of 2008, Thornburg played collegiate summer baseball for the Winchester Royals of the Valley Baseball League in Virginia; he recorded a 1.48 ERA in 24 1/3 innings pitched, and was named to the league's First Team. He played for the Brewster Whitecaps of the Cape Cod Baseball League in the summer of 2009. In 2010, Thornburg was twice named the Big South pitcher of the week.

== Professional career ==
=== Milwaukee Brewers ===
The Milwaukee Brewers drafted Thornburg in the third round, with the 96th overall selection, of the 2010 Major League Baseball draft.

==== Minor League Baseball ====
Thornburg signed with the Brewers and pitched during the 2010 season for the Helena Brewers in the Rookie-level Pioneer League. Thornburg began the 2011 season with the Wisconsin Timber Rattlers of the Class A Midwest League, then received a promotion to the Brevard County Manatees of the Class A-Advanced Florida State League (FSL). Thornburg had a 7–0 win–loss record and 1.50 earned run average (ERA) with Wisconsin, and represented the Timber Rattlers in the Midwest League All-Star Game. He was named FSL pitcher of the week in his first week after the promotion. Thornburg participated in the 2011 All-Star Futures Game.

MLB.com ranked Thornburg as the Brewers' fourth best prospect heading into the 2012 season. The Brewers assigned Thornburg to the Huntsville Stars of the Class AA Southern League. He had an 8–1 record with a 3.00 ERA in 13 games started, and was named the Brewers' minor league pitcher of the month for May 2012. He was also selected to appear in the Southern League All-Star Game. However, instead of making an All-Star Game appearance, Thornburg was promoted to the major leagues.

==== 2012 ====
Thornburg made his debut for the Brewers on June 19, 2012, against the Toronto Blue Jays. He was called up to make an emergency start, for the injured Shaun Marcum. In his debut, Thorburg allowed back-to-back-to-back home runs to Colby Rasmus, José Bautista, and Edwin Encarnación. He also collected his first major league hit with a double to left center in his first major league at bat. He was assigned to the Nashville Sounds of the Class AAA Pacific Coast League after the game. He made additional MLB appearances in July, and then late in the season. Overall, with the 2012 Brewers, Thornburg appeared in eight games (three starts) without a win or loss, with a 4.50 ERA and 20 strikeouts and seven walks in 22 innings pitched.

==== 2013 ====
Thornburg appeared in three games with the Brewers during spring training in 2013, but was cut on March 11 and assigned to Nashville. He was the Sounds' Opening Day starter, pitching five innings and giving up one run, earning a no decision. On June 5, Thornburg was recalled, replacing the injured Marco Estrada; at the time, Thornburg was 0–7 with a 6.75 ERA in 12 starts with Nashville. Thornburg pitched that day against the Oakland Athletics, providing two scoreless innings of relief in the 6–1 loss. He recorded his first win in his next appearance, pitching two scoreless innings against the Philadelphia Phillies on June 8. After the game, Thornburg was optioned back to Nashville, when Jim Henderson was activated off the disabled list. Thornburg made three more starts with Nashville before being recalled on June 29, replacing Caleb Gindl. He spent the rest of the season with Milwaukee. Overall, in 18 games (seven starts) with the 2013 Brewers, Thornburg went 3–1 with a 2.03 ERA, striking out 48 and walking 26 in 66 2/3 innings.

==== 2014 ====
In 2014, Thornburg began the season in the Brewers' bullpen before suffering a season-ending elbow injury in June. With the 2014 Brewers, Thornburg made 27 appearances, all in relief, compiling a 3–1 record with 4.25 ERA with 28 strikeouts and 21 walks in 29 2/3 innings pitched.

==== 2015 ====
After starting the 2015 season with Milwaukee, Thornburg spent three months in Triple-A regaining his arm strength, before being recalled at the end of July. With the 2015 Brewers, Thornburg made 24 appearances, all in relief, compiling an 0–2 record with 3.67 ERA, 34 strikeouts, and 12 walks in 34 1/3 innings pitched.

==== 2016 ====
Prior to the 2016 season, the Brewers decided to use Thornburg as a full-time reliever rather than preparing him as a starter during spring training and in Triple-A. Thornburg became the Brewers' setup-man and displayed career-best fastball velocity, reaching as high as 96 mph (154 km/h) with his heater. He set the Brewers franchise record for consecutive innings without allowing a baserunner by a relief pitcher. With the 2016 Brewers, Thornburg made a career-high 67 appearances, all in relief, compiling an 8–5 record with 2.15 ERA, 90 strikeouts, and 25 walks in 67 innings pitched.

Overall, in parts of five seasons with Milwaukee, Thornburg appeared in 144 games (ten starts), compiling a 14–9 record with 2.87 ERA; he had 220 strikeouts and 91 walks in 219 2/3 innings pitched.

=== Boston Red Sox ===
On December 6, 2016, the Brewers traded Thornburg to the Boston Red Sox for Travis Shaw, Mauricio Dubon, Josh Pennington and a player to be named later. The Red Sox completed the trade in June 2017, sending Yeison Coca to the Brewers.

Thornburg started the 2017 season on the disabled list with a shoulder injury, and in June was diagnosed with thoracic outlet syndrome, requiring surgery; as a result, he missed the entire season.

In 2018, Thornburg's recovery from surgery resulted in him missing spring training. He joined the Triple-A Pawtucket Red Sox at the start of May, for a rehabilitation assignment. That assignment was stopped after nine appearances, and Thornburg started a new rehabilitation assignment on June 2, pitching in both Double-A and Triple-A. During his rehabilitation assignments, Thornburg made 18 total appearances (one start), compiling an 0–1 record with 4.96 ERA, 16 strikeouts, and eight walks in 16 1/3 innings pitched. Thornburg was added to Boston's active roster on July 4, and he made his debut with the Red Sox on July 6, allowing one hit and one run in an inning pitched against the Kansas City Royals. Overall with the 2018 Red Sox, Thornburg made 25 relief appearances, compiling a 2–0 record and 5.63 ERA with 21 strikeouts in 24 innings. He was not included on Boston's postseason roster.

On November 30, 2018, the Red Sox re-signed Thornburg to a one-year contract worth $1.75 million, plus incentives worth up to $400,000. Thornburg was included on Boston's Opening Day roster to start the 2019 season. Through May 22, he had 16 appearances, recording 22 strikeouts and 10 walks in 18 2/3 innings with a 7.71 ERA and no decisions. On May 23, Thornburg was placed on the 10-day injured list with a right hip impingement. He was sent on a rehabilitation assignment with Pawtucket on June 9. After being activated from the injured list, Thornburg declined a minor league assignment and was released by the Red Sox on July 10.

=== Los Angeles Dodgers ===
On July 30, 2019, Thornburg signed a minor league contract with the Los Angeles Dodgers organization. He was assigned to the Triple-A Oklahoma City Dodgers, with whom he compiled a 6.00 ERA and 15 strikeouts over 12 innings pitched. Thornburg elected free agency following the season on November 4.

=== Cincinnati Reds ===
On December 31, 2019, Thornburg signed a minor league deal with the Cincinnati Reds that included an invitation to Spring Training. On August 14, 2020, the Reds selected Thornburg to the active roster. In mid-September 2020, Thornburg underwent Tommy John surgery.

=== Atlanta Braves ===
On March 16, 2022, Thornburg signed a one-year, non-guaranteed major-league contract worth $900,000 with the Atlanta Braves. He was placed on the Opening Day roster. The Braves designated Thornburg for assignment on May 23. He was released on May 28.

=== Minnesota Twins ===
On June 6, 2022, Thornburg signed a minor league deal with the Minnesota Twins. After he appeared in two games for the St. Paul Saints, the Twins promoted him to the major leagues on June 12. In 5 games for Minnesota, Thornburg recorded a 2.79 ERA with 4 strikeouts in 9.2 innings of work. On July 1, he was designated for assignment by the Twins following the promotion of Juan Minaya. He cleared waivers and was sent outright to Triple-A St. Paul on July 4. He was released on September 5.

== Coaching career ==
In 2025, the Milwaukee Brewers hired Thornburg to serve as an associate coach for their Double-A affiliate, the Biloxi Shuckers. On February 4, 2026, Thornburg was moved up to the Triple-A Nashville Sounds as the affiliate's pitching coach.

== Scouting report ==
Thornburg had a 91 to 96 mph (146 to 154 km/h) fastball. Due to his velocity, size, over-the-top delivery, and repertoire, he drew favorable comparisons to Tim Lincecum. He threw two off-speed pitches, including a strong power curveball in the upper-70s, and a sinking change-up in the low-80s.

As a late-inning reliever/closer, Thornburg's fastball was consistently thrown around 94 to 97 mph (151 to 156 km/h). His curveball was his primary off-speed pitch.
