= Donovan Hand =

American baseball player (born 1986)

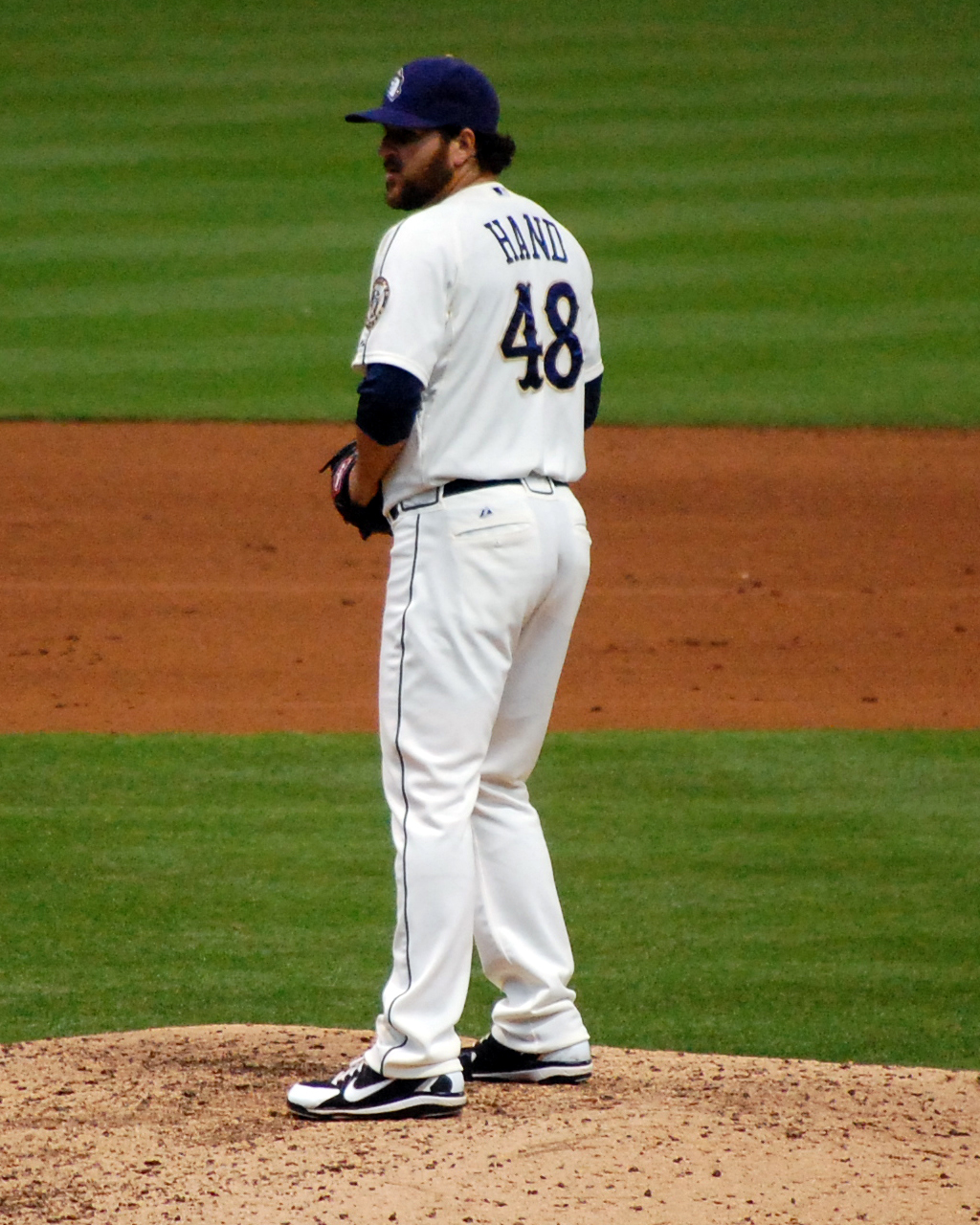
- Hand with the Milwaukee Brewers
- Pitcher
- Born: April 20, 1986 (age 40); Hatton, Alabama, U.S.
- Batted: Right Threw: Right

Professional debut
- MLB: May 26, 2013, for the Milwaukee Brewers
- CPBL: March 24, 2016, for the Brother Elephants

Last appearance
- MLB: June 17, 2015, for the Cincinnati Reds
- CPBL: April 17, 2016, for the Brother Elephants

MLB statistics
- Win–loss record: 1–5
- Earned run average: 3.53
- Strikeouts: 40

CPBL statistics
- Win–loss record: 1–0
- Earned run average: 9.00
- Strikeouts: 11
- Stats at Baseball Reference

Teams
- Milwaukee Brewers (2013); Cincinnati Reds (2015); Brother Elephants (2016)

Donovan Jay Hand (born April 20, 1986) is an American former professional baseball pitcher. He played in Major League Baseball (MLB) for the Milwaukee Brewers and Cincinnati Reds and in the Chinese Professional Baseball League (CPBL) for the Brother Elephants.

== Career ==
=== Milwaukee Brewers ===
Hand graduated from Hatton High School in Town Creek, Alabama and played college baseball at Jacksonville State University in Jacksonville, Alabama. He was drafted by the Brewers in the 14th round of the 2007 amateur entry draft. That year, he split time playing for their Rookie League Helena Brewers and Class A West Virginia Power. Hand split the 2008 season between the Class A-Advanced Brevard County Manatees and Double-A Huntsville Stars and continued with the Stars in 2009. In 2010 and 2011, Hand split his time between Huntsville and the Triple-A Nashville Sounds. In 2012, he stuck with the Sounds until being called up to the Brewers during the 2013 season.

Hand made his MLB debut on May 26, 2013. And made his first career start on June 22, 2013. Hand threw 4 2/3 scoreless innings, and teammates Burke Badenhop, John Axford, Michael Gonzalez, and Francisco Rodriguez secured the shut out. Rodriguez notched the save, for save number 300 in his career. After appearing in 31 games (7 of those being starts), He was designated for assignment on February 7, 2014, to make room for Francisco Rodriguez on the 40-man roster and was later optioned to Triple-A. As of July 21, 2014, Hand is 1–6 with a 5.44 ERA in 39 appearances all in relief for the Nashville Sounds.

=== Cincinnati Reds ===
On January 15, 2015, Hand signed a minor league deal with the Cincinnati Reds.

=== Brother Elephants ===
Hand signed with the Brother Elephants of the Chinese Professional Baseball League for the 2016 season.

=== New York Mets ===
On March 4, 2017, Hand signed a minor league contract with the New York Mets organization. He made 25 starts split between the Double–A Binghamton Rumble Ponies and Triple–A Las Vegas 51s, posting a 7–8 record and 5.99 ERA with 92 strikeouts in 139 2/3 innings pitched. Hand elected free agency following the season on November 6.
