= Caleb Gindl =

American baseball player (born 1988)

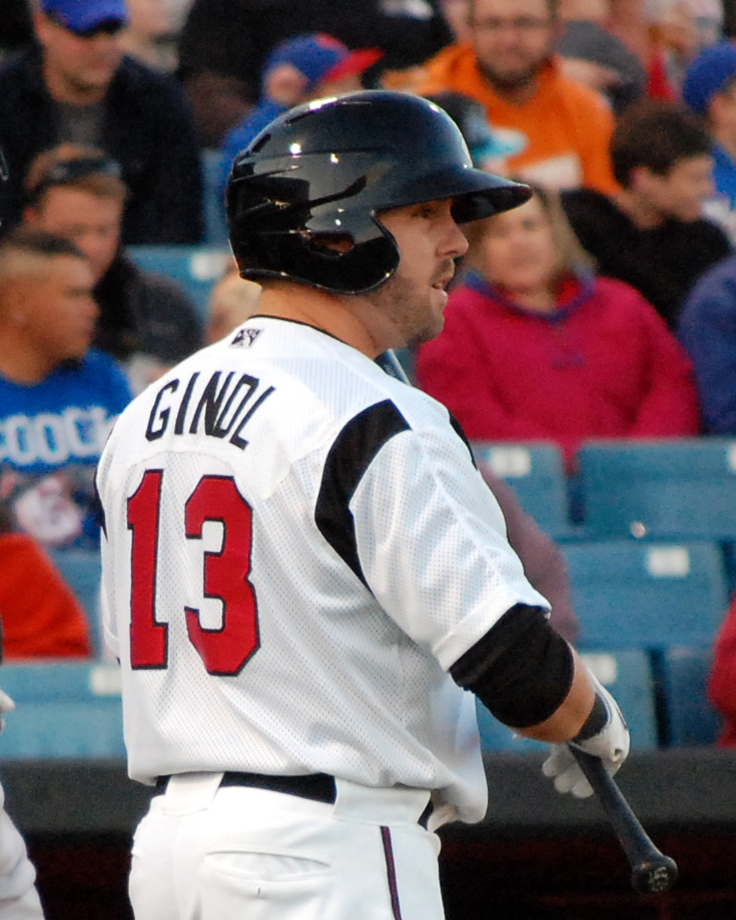
- Gindl playing for the Nashville Sounds
- Outfielder
- Born: August 31, 1988 (age 37); Molino, Florida, U.S.
- Batted: Left Threw: Left

MLB debut
- June 15, 2013, for the Milwaukee Brewers

Last MLB appearance
- May 11, 2014, for the Milwaukee Brewers

MLB statistics
- Batting average: .232
- Home runs: 5
- Runs batted in: 14
- Stats at Baseball Reference

Teams
- Milwaukee Brewers (2013–2014)

Caleb Charles Gindl (born August 31, 1988) is an American former professional baseball outfielder. He has played in Major League Baseball (MLB) for the Milwaukee Brewers.

== Career ==
Gindl attended Pace High School in Pace, Florida.

=== Milwaukee Brewers ===
==== Minor leagues ====
The Milwaukee Brewers selected Gindl in the fifth round (161st overall) of the 2007 Major League Baseball draft. That year, he played for the rookie-level Helena Brewers, where in 55 games, he hit .372 with five home runs, 42 RBI and 22 doubles. He was a Pioneer League Post-Season All-Star, along with fellow Brewers Jonathan Lucroy, Eric Farris, and Roque Mercedes. He played the entire 2008 season with the Single-A West Virginia Power, where in 137 games, he hit .307 with 13 home runs, 81 RBI, 38 doubles, 86 runs, and 14 stolen bases, and was again a Post-Season All-Star. After the season, he played for the West Oahu CaneFires of Hawaii Winter Baseball, where he hit .281 with three home runs and 18 RBI in 25 games. In 2009, he was promoted to the High-A Brevard County Manatees, where in 112 games, he hit .277 with 17 home runs, 71 RBI, and 18 stolen bases, and he was a Mid and Post-Season All-Star. Gindl spent the entire 2010 season with the Double-A Huntsville Stars, where in 128 games, he hit .272 with nine home runs, 60 RBI, and 33 doubles. After the season, he played for Surprise in the Arizona Fall League, where in 16 games, he hit .259 with two home runs, six RBI, and 11 runs, and he was named an AFL Rising Star, along with fellow Brewer Jeremy Jeffress. He received an invitation to major league spring training with the Brewers in 2011. Gindl played 2011 with the Triple-A Nashville Sounds, where in 126 games, he hit .307 with 15 home runs, 60 RBI, 84 runs, and 63 walks. In 2012 with Nashville, Gindl hit .261 with 12 home runs and 50 RBI across 127 appearances. Gindl began 2013 with Nashville, where he was hitting .274 with eight home runs and 38 RBI before being recalled.

==== Major leagues ====
The Brewers promoted Gindl to the major leagues for the first time on June 15, replacing Ryan Braun. He recorded his first major league hit, a pinch-hit single off Tim Hudson of the Atlanta Braves, on June 22. Gindl was used off the bench and in left field, along with Logan Schafer in his first stint up. On June 29, Gindl was optioned to Nashville to make room for Tyler Thornburg. He went 5-for-20 with one RBI in his first stint with the major league club. On July 11, Gindl was recalled, replacing the previous day's starter, Johnny Hellweg. On July 21, Gindl hit his first career home run, a walk-off homer in the bottom of the 13th inning to seal a 1–0 win against the Miami Marlins. He became the first Brewer in franchise history to record a walk off home run as their first career home run. Gindl was again used mostly off the bench, but he also got starts at left, along with Schafer and Khris Davis, and was occasionally used in right field in lieu of Norichika Aoki. In 57 games with Milwaukee during his rookie campaign, he hit .242 with five home runs, 14 RBI, 17 runs, and 20 walks.

Gindl was designated for assignment by the Brewers on September 2, 2014.

=== Toronto Blue Jays ===
Gindl signed a minor league contract with the Toronto Blue Jays organization on December 12, 2014. He made 85 appearances for the Triple-A Buffalo Bisons, hitting .228/.287/.319 with four home runs, 27 RBI, and two stolen bases. Gindl elected free agency following the season on November 6, 2015.

=== Lancaster Barnstormers ===
On March 22, 2016, Gindl signed with the Lancaster Barnstormers of the Atlantic League of Professional Baseball. Gindl made 135 appearances for the Barnstormers during the year, slashing .295/.359/.425 with 10 home runs, 72 RBI, and seven stolen bases.

=== San Francisco Giants ===
On December 13, 2016, Gindl signed a minor league contract with the Chicago White Sox. He was released in March 2017, prior to the start of the regular season.

On July 16, 2017, Gindl signed a minor league contract with the San Francisco Giants. In 44 appearances for the Double-A Richmond Flying Squirrels, Gindl batted .284/.335/.533 with eight home runs and 25 RBI. He was released by the organization on September 6. On September 17, Gindl re–signed with San Francisco on a new minor league contract.

Gindl split the 2018 season between Double–A Richmond and the Triple–A Sacramento River Cats, accumulating a .299/.369/.417 batting line with three home runs and 34 RBI. He became a free agent after the season on November 2, 2018.

=== Lancaster Barnstormers (second stint) ===
On April 9, 2019, Gindl signed with the Lancaster Barnstormers of the Atlantic League of Professional Baseball. He made 139 appearances for the Barnstormers, slashing .291/.389/.502 with 22 home runs and 91 RBI. Gindl became a free agent following the season.

On March 12, 2020, Gindl re-signed with the Barnstormers for the 2020 season as a player-coach. However, the season was canceled due to the COVID-19 pandemic and he became a free agent after the season.

On April 28, 2021, Gindl re-signed with the Barnstormers for the 2021 season. On June 29, Gindl set a Barnstormers franchise record by homering in seven straight games, breaking a mark previously held by Ryan Harvey. He finished the year having played in 115 games, with a .291/.392/.578 batting line, 34 home runs, and 91 RBI. Gindl became a free agent following the season.
