= Sean Halton =

American baseball player (born 1987)

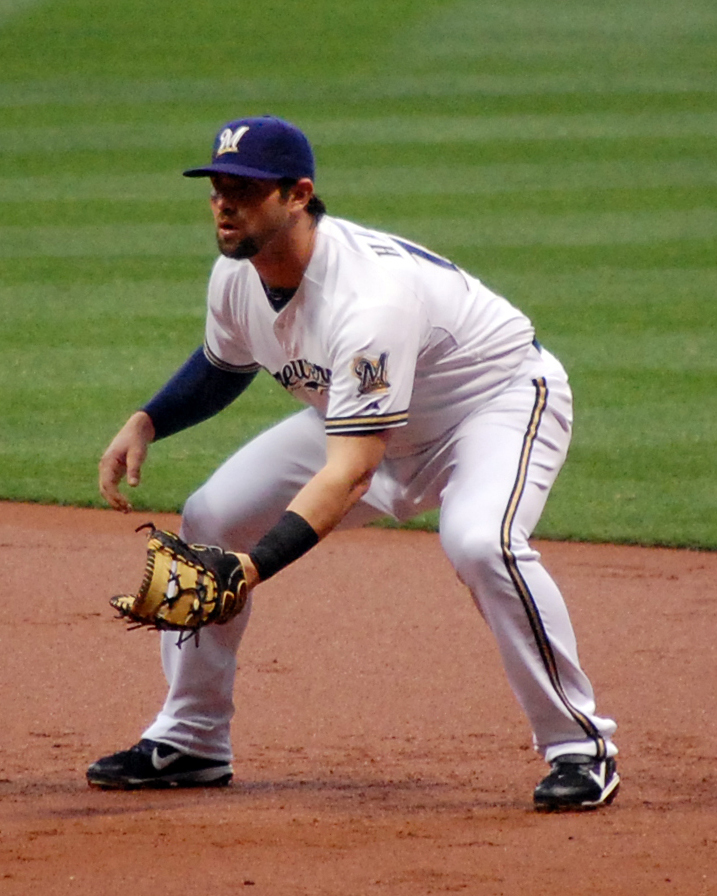
- Halton with the Milwaukee Brewers
- First baseman / Outfielder
- Born: June 7, 1987 (age 39); San Francisco, California, U.S.
- Batted: Right Threw: Right

MLB debut
- June 27, 2013, for the Milwaukee Brewers

Last MLB appearance
- September 29, 2013, for the Milwaukee Brewers

MLB statistics
- Batting average: .238
- Home runs: 4
- Runs batted in: 17
- Stats at Baseball Reference

Teams
- Milwaukee Brewers (2013)

Sean Michael Halton (born June 7, 1987) is an American former professional baseball first baseman. He played in Major League Baseball (MLB) for the Milwaukee Brewers in 2013.

== Career ==
Halton attended Fresno High School and Fresno City College. After two years at FCC, he then attended Lewis-Clark State College in Lewiston, Idaho.

=== Milwaukee Brewers ===
He was drafted by Milwaukee in the 13th round of the 2009 MLB draft. That year, he played for the Helena Brewers of the Rookie-level Pioneer League. He played part of the 2010 season with the Wisconsin Timber Rattlers of the Single-A Midwest League and then ended the season with the Brevard County Manatees of the High-A Florida State League.

In 2011, Halton spent the entire season with the Double-A affiliated Huntsville Stars. Halton spent all of 2012 with the Nashville Sounds of the Triple-A Pacific Coast League. After spending all of 2013 spring training with the big league club, Halton was sent to Nashville to begin the season.

Halton made his major league debut for the Brewers on June 27, 2013, against the Chicago Cubs. In a pinch-hit at-bat, Halton singled off of Cubs pitcher Matt Garza to record his first major league hit in his first major league plate appearance. Halton made 42 total appearances for Milwaukee during his rookie campaign, hitting .238/.291/.396 with four home runs and 17 RBI.

On March 18, 2014, Halton was removed from the 40–man roster and sent outright to Triple–A Nashville. He made 122 appearances for the Sounds, slashing .293/.342/.435 with eight home runs and 63 RBI.

=== Baltimore Orioles ===
On December 11, 2014, Halton was drafted by the Baltimore Orioles in the minor league phase of the Rule 5 draft. Halton spent the 2015 campaign with the Double–A Bowie Baysox and Triple–A Norfolk Tides. In 118 appearances for the two affiliates, he posted a combined .228/.309/.327 slash line seven home runs and 52 RBI. Halton elected free agency following the season on November 6, 2015.

=== Lancaster Barnstormers ===
On March 9, 2016, Halton signed with the Lancaster Barnstormers of the Atlantic League of Professional Baseball. Halton made 106 appearances for the Barnstormers, slashing .290/.354/.550 with 22 home runs, 71 RBI, and six stolen bases.

=== Broncos de Reynosa ===
On April 1, 2016, Halton signed with the Broncos de Reynosa of the Mexican League. He made 30 appearances for the Broncos, batting .271/.363/.402 with two home runs and 17 RBI. Halton was released by Reynosa on May 7.

=== Lancaster Barnstormers (second stint) ===
On January 3, 2017, Halton signed a minor-league contract with the Detroit Tigers. He was released prior to the start of the regular season on March 30.

On April 5, 2017, Halton signed with the Lancaster Barnstormers of the Atlantic League of Professional Baseball. He played in 135 games for Lancaster, hitting .267/.340/.506 with 26 home runs, 90 RBI, and three stolen bases. Halton became a free agent following the season.

Halton retired from professional baseball in January 2018.

== Personal life ==
Halton now owns a baseball training facility in Pacific Grove, California called "The Clubhouse 831"

== See also ==
- Rule 5 draft results
