= Hiram Burgos =

Puerto Rican baseball player (born 1987)

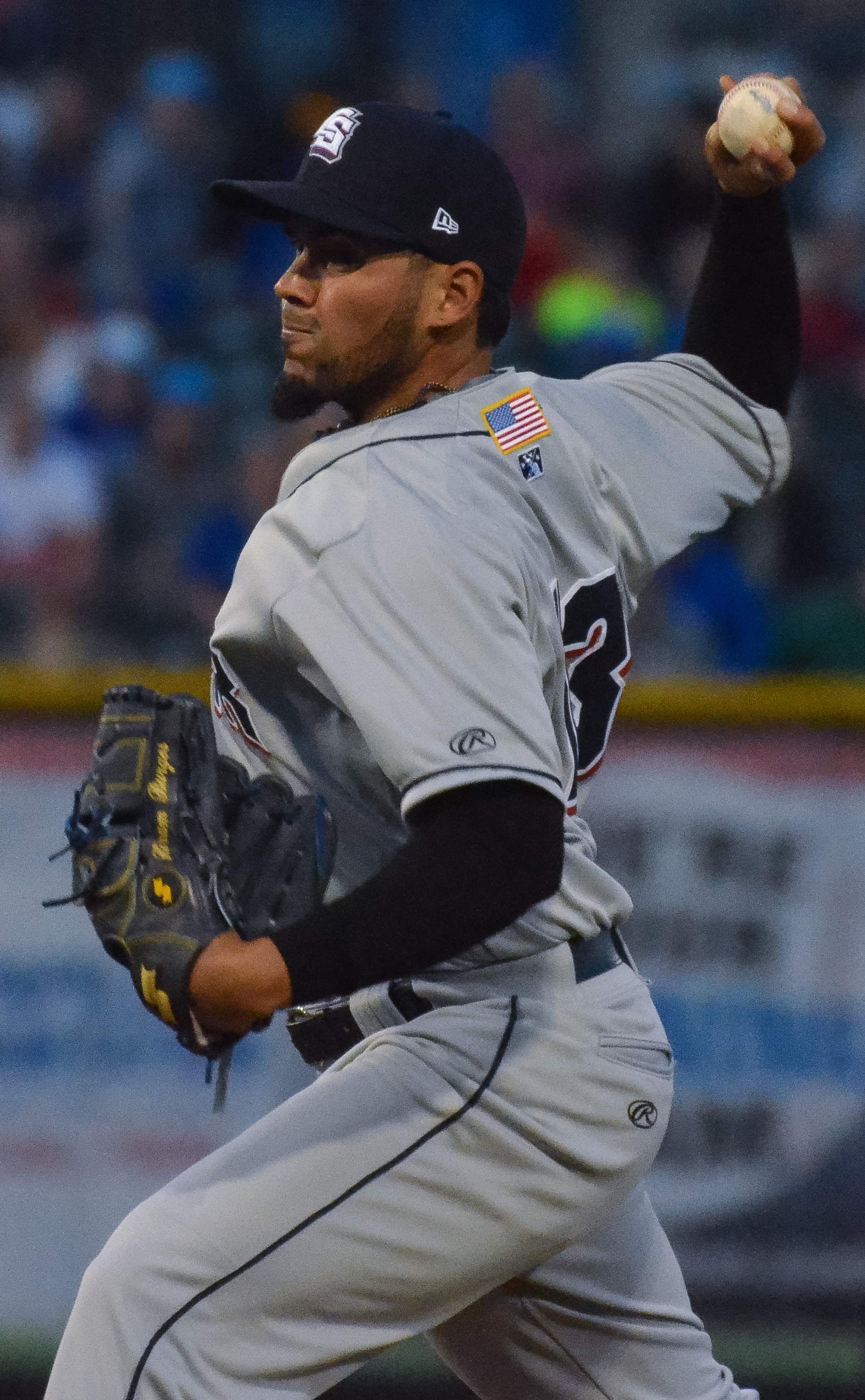
- Burgos pitching for the Colorado Springs Sky Sox, triple-A affiliates of the Brewers, in 2016
- Pitcher
- Born: August 4, 1987 (age 39); Cayey, Puerto Rico
- Batted: Right Threw: Right

MLB debut
- April 20, 2013, for the Milwaukee Brewers

Last MLB appearance
- May 21, 2013, for the Milwaukee Brewers

MLB statistics
- Win–loss record: 1–2
- Earned run average: 6.44
- Strikeouts: 18
- Stats at Baseball Reference

Teams
- Milwaukee Brewers (2013)
Medals
Representing Puerto Rico
Men's baseball
World Baseball Classic
Silver medal – second place	2013 San Francisco	Team
Silver medal – second place	2017 Los Angeles	Team

Hiram Burgos (born August 4, 1987) is a Puerto Rican former professional baseball pitcher. He played in Major League Baseball (MLB) for the Milwaukee Brewers in 2013.

== Early life ==
When he was three years old his parents, Hiram Burgos Delgado and Ivette Irizarry Arce, introduced him to the sport by visiting baseball parks. He attended the Puerto Rico Baseball Academy and High School and Bethune-Cookman College. Burgos expected to be selected in the 2008 Major League Baseball draft after recording a 9–1 season while pitching for Bethune-Cookman University, but was disappointed after going undrafted. As a consequence of this, he decided to complete his bachelor's degree following the insistence of his mother.

== Playing career ==
Burgos was drafted by the Milwaukee Brewers in the 6th round, with the 196th overall selection, of the 2009 Major League Baseball draft. On November 20, 2012, the Brewers added Burgos to their 40-man roster to protect him from the Rule 5 draft.

The Brewers promoted Burgos to the major leagues for the first time on April 19, 2013 and subsequently made his major league debut the following day. His first career start came the same day at home against the Chicago Cubs. On May 11, Burgos had an ineffective start against the Cincinnati Reds, allowing 12 runs (10 earned) in just 3 innings pitched. A day after his sixth start of the season on May 21, Burgos was placed on the 15-day disabled list with a right shoulder impingement.

Burgos was released by the Brewers on September 2, 2014, and re–signed with the team on a minor league contract on January 30, 2015. Burgos spent the 2016 campaign with the Triple–A Colorado Springs SkySox, compiling a 10–10 record and 4.40 ERA with 115 strikeouts across 27 games (25 starts). He elected free agency following the season on November 7, 2016.

On December 15, 2016, Burgos signed another minor league contract with the Brewers that included an invitation to spring training. Burgos was invited to join the Brewers' spring training roster for 2017 and started in the Brewers' first game against the University of Wisconsin-Milwaukee, in which he pitched two scoreless innings. He made 18 appearances (15 starts) split between Biloxi and Colorado Springs, posting an aggregate 4–5 record and 6.06 ERA with 64 strikeouts across 62 1/3 innings pitched. Burgos elected free agency on November 6, 2017, Burgos later re-signed with the Brewers on a minor league contract on February 12, 2018. He was released by the Brewers organization on October 2, having not appeared during the 2018 season.

== Coaching career ==
=== Milwaukee Brewers ===
Burgos retired after the 2018 season and was hired as the pitching coach for the Arizona League Brewers, the rookie–level affiliate of the Milwaukee Brewers. Burgos was later promoted to serve as the pitching coach for Milwaukee's High–A affiliate, the Wisconsin Timber Rattlers.

=== Chicago White Sox ===
On January 22, 2026, Burgos was announced as a lower-level pitching coordinator within the Chicago White Sox organization.

== International career ==
=== World Baseball Classic ===
Burgos has played for the Puerto Rican national team twice, in the 2013 World Baseball Classic and in the 2017 World Baseball Classic, winning in both tournaments the silver medal.

== See also ==
- List of Major League Baseball players from Puerto Rico
