= John Axford =

Canadian baseball player (born 1983)

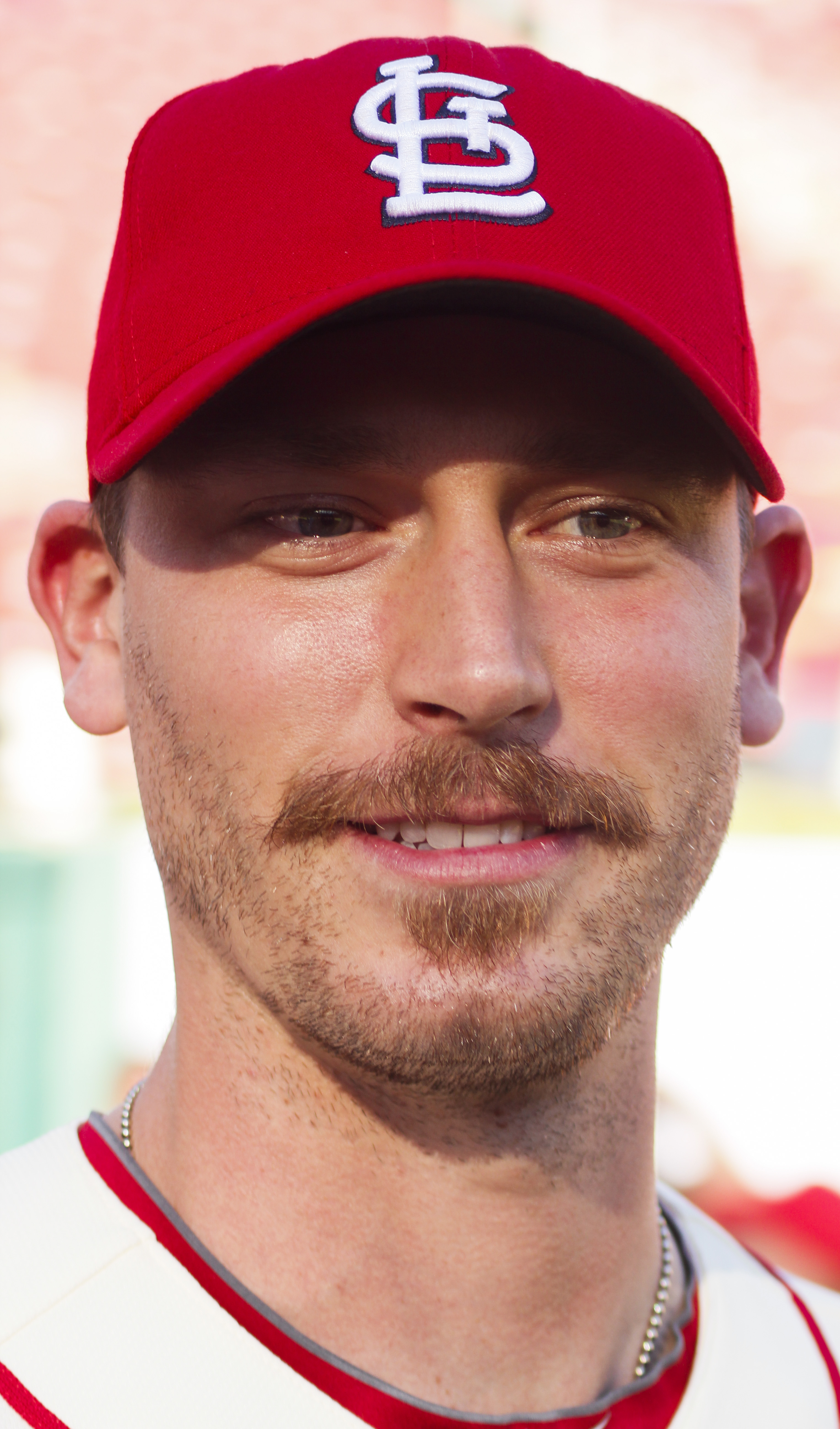
- Axford with the St. Louis Cardinals
- Pitcher
- Born: April 1, 1983 (age 43); Simcoe, Ontario, Canada
- Batted: Right Threw: Right

MLB debut
- September 15, 2009, for the Milwaukee Brewers

Last MLB appearance
- August 2, 2021, for the Milwaukee Brewers

MLB statistics
- Win–loss record: 38–34
- Earned run average: 3.90
- Strikeouts: 589
- Saves: 144
- Stats at Baseball Reference

Teams
- Milwaukee Brewers (2009–2013); St. Louis Cardinals (2013); Cleveland Indians (2014); Pittsburgh Pirates (2014); Colorado Rockies (2015); Oakland Athletics (2016–2017); Toronto Blue Jays (2018); Los Angeles Dodgers (2018); Milwaukee Brewers (2021)

Career highlights and awards
- NL Rolaids Relief Man Award (2011); NL saves leader (2011); Milwaukee Brewers Wall of Honor

John Berton Axford (born April 1, 1983), nicknamed "Ax Man", is a Canadian former professional baseball pitcher. He played in Major League Baseball (MLB) for the Milwaukee Brewers, St. Louis Cardinals, Cleveland Indians, Pittsburgh Pirates, Colorado Rockies, Oakland Athletics, Toronto Blue Jays, and Los Angeles Dodgers. Axford made his MLB debut in 2009 with the Brewers. He won the Rolaids Relief Man Award in 2011 after leading the National League in saves.

== Amateur career ==
Raised in Port Dover, Ontario, Axford attended Assumption College School in nearby Brantford. Because the school did not have an interscholastic baseball program, he played for Port Dover Minor Baseball, then Team Ontario and Team Canada. His combined four-year totals with the three clubs were a 37–12 record, a 1.88 earned run average (ERA), 278 innings pitched, 432 strikeouts and 173 walks.

The Seattle Mariners selected Axford in the seventh round (219th overall) of the 2001 Major League Baseball (MLB) draft, but he accepted an athletic scholarship to the University of Notre Dame instead. In 2002, he played collegiate summer baseball with the Hyannis Mets of the Cape Cod Baseball League, and returned to the league in 2003 to play for the Cotuit Kettleers. He was inactive during his junior year after undergoing Tommy John surgery in December 2003. Used as a starting pitcher in 26 of 36 games, his record in three seasons with the Fighting Irish was 14–6. Despite losing his scholarship as a redshirt senior in 2005, he still earned a bachelor's degree in film, television and theatre.

Axford was selected by the Cincinnati Reds in the 42nd round (1,259th overall) of the 2005 MLB draft. He spent the spring of 2006, his one remaining year of collegiate athletic eligibility, at Canisius College where he went 3–8, with a 5.01 earned run average in fourteen starts. After watching him in action with the Golden Griffins, the Reds declined to offer a contract. By that summer, he was pitching for the Melville Millionaires of the Western Major Baseball League. A nineteen-strikeout performance in a seven-inning contest caught the attention of the New York Yankees.

== Professional career ==
=== New York Yankees ===
The New York Yankees signed Axford as a minor-league free agent on August 11, 2006.

His 2007 campaign was divided between three Class A farm teams (Staten Island Yankees, Charleston RiverDogs and Tampa Yankees) and the Triple A Scranton/Wilkes-Barre Yankees, where he appeared in only one game. He had a combined 1–4 record in 27 games, and was released on December 14, 2007.

=== Milwaukee Brewers ===
After spending the winter working as a cell phone salesman for Telus in the Toronto area, he signed with the Milwaukee Brewers on March 4, 2008. A 5–10 campaign with a 4.55 ERA for the Brevard County Manatees was followed by an offseason employment as a bartender at an East Side Mario's location in Hamilton, Ontario.

Used exclusively out of the bullpen in 2009, he improved to a combined 9–1 with the Manatees, Huntsville Stars and Nashville Sounds. He was called up to the Brewers on September 7, and made his major league debut eight nights later as the last Brewers pitcher in a 13–7 loss to the Chicago Cubs at Wrigley Field. He surrendered an earned run, a hit and three walks in one inning pitched.

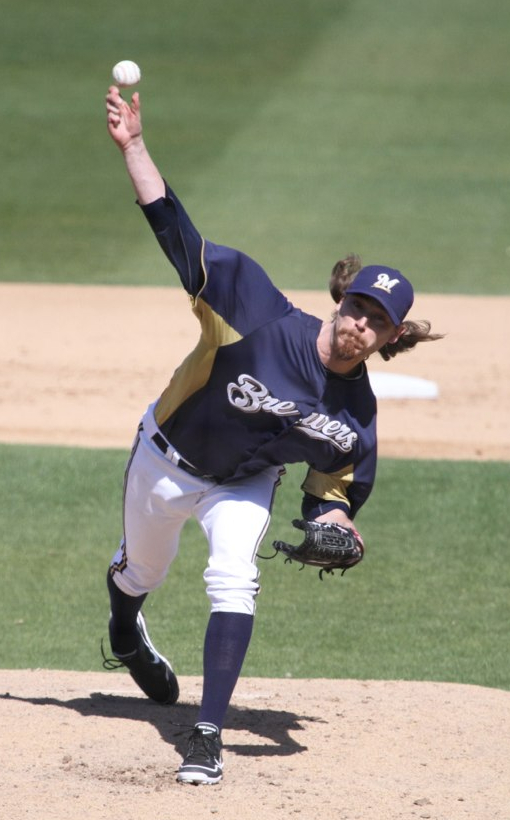
Axford pitching for the Milwaukee Brewers in 2012 spring training

Axford started 2010 in Nashville before being promoted by the Brewers on May 15. With Trevor Hoffman struggling in save situations, Axford, despite having never been a closer in his career, was given the job, where he became a big success in the role and gained popularity with Brewers fans as he sported a handlebar mustache in many of his early appearances, evoking memories of legendary reliever Rollie Fingers. Axford finished his first full season with an 8–2 record, a 2.48 ERA, pitched in 50 games, was 24 out of 27 in save attempts, and struck out 76 batters in 58 innings pitched. He was named a relief pitcher on Baseball America's 2010 All-Rookie Team.

Axford went into 2011 as the Brewers closer and struggled early, blowing two saves in the first two weeks of the season, then went on to convert every single save opportunity the rest of the way. In a game against the Chicago Cubs on July 27, Axford converted his 26th consecutive save opportunity, breaking Doug Jones's Brewers franchise record. Axford was named Delivery Man of the Month Award winner for July 2011, in which he recorded 11 saves with a 2.57 ERA. On September 24, he set the Brewers franchise record for most saves in a single season, saving his 45th against the Florida Marlins. For the season he led the National League in saves (46), and was second in games finished (63), pitching 73 2/3 innings with 86 strikeouts and 59 hits while going 2–2 with a 1.95 ERA. Axford was the first Brewers pitcher since Rollie Fingers to be a league leader in saves. He continued his success in the 2011 postseason, appearing in 6 playoff games and racking up 3 saves and a 1.29 ERA while striking out 9 batters in 7 innings pitched. Axford, however, blew his first save since the second week of the season in the decisive Game Five of the NLDS, but still got the win as the Brewers won in the 10th inning. On October 28, Axford was named the recipient of the 2011 Robert Goulet Memorial Mustached American of the Year Award by the American Mustache Institute. Recognition of Axford's success in 2011 continued into the offseason, where he was ninth overall in voting for the NL Cy Young Award and 17th overall for the NL MVP award. He was nominated for and won several awards recognizing his success, including the NL Rolaids Relief Man (given to the league's best closer), and the Canadian Tip O'Neill Award (presented annually by the Canadian Baseball Hall of Fame to the Canadian-born player judged to have excelled in individual achievement and team contribution). He shared the award with Joey Votto, being the third time the Tip O'Neill Award had been shared.

Axford began 2012 with six straight saves, extending a streak to 49 consecutive save opportunities converted. This was the fourth-longest streak in MLB history. The streak ended on May 11, 2012, in a game against the Chicago Cubs. As it turned out, Axford's wife began going into labor with the birth of his second child that night, and he was unavailable to comment after the game. Instead, he left a handwritten note for journalists in his locker. On July 16, Axford gave up three runs in the top of the ninth to blow a 2–0 lead. Axford, however, was able to regain his control and was reinstated as the Brewers closer in the second half of the season. He managed to rebound enough to finish the 2012 season with 35 saves, which was still good enough for 6th in the National League, with a 4.67 ERA, plus a new career high in strikeouts in a season, striking out 93 batters in 69 innings pitched, averaging 12 strikeouts per 9 innings pitched. On September 16, Axford recorded his 100th career save against the New York Mets.

On January 18, 2013, the Brewers announced they had avoided arbitration with Axford, signing him to a one-year contract worth $5 million. He pitched for the Canadian national baseball team in the 2013 World Baseball Classic (WBC) before the season. In his first four appearances, he had an 0–2 record with 22.10 ERA and a blown save. He threw 98 miles per hour (158 km/h) during the WBC, but only 90–91 miles per hour (145–146 km/h) with the Brewers. The Brewers replaced Axford as their closer with Canadian-born Jim Henderson. He had a 4.45 ERA in 62 games for Milwaukee.

=== St. Louis Cardinals ===
On August 30, 2013, the Brewers traded Axford to the St. Louis Cardinals for a player to be named later, who was later identified as Michael Blazek. Cardinals' coaches informed Axford he was tipping his pitches. With the Cardinals, he worked with catcher Yadier Molina to fix mechanical flaws the Cardinals' coaching staff diagnosed. Axford completed the season with a 1.74 ERA in his last 13 regular-season games, and a 1.59 ERA during the 2013 postseason, including 2 1/3 innings without allowing a run during the 2013 World Series. After the season, the Cardinals opted not to tender Axford a contract for the 2014 season, making him a free agent.

=== Cleveland Indians ===
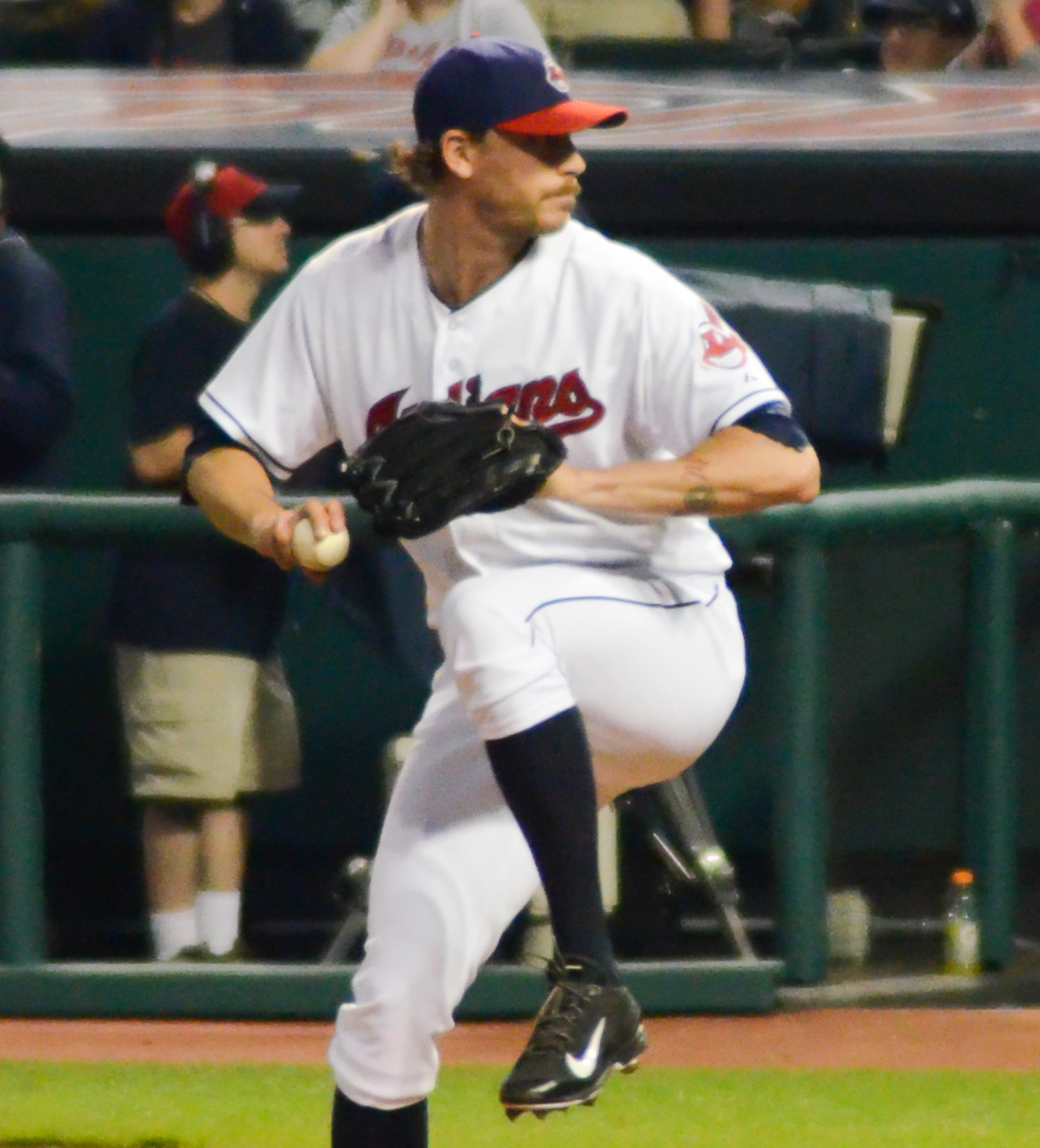
Axford pitching for the Cleveland Indians in 2014

On December 19, 2013, Axford signed a one-year, $4.5 million contract with the Cleveland Indians, who announced he would serve as their closer. Despite 9 saves in April, Axford struggled in the closer role and lost the job to a closer-by-committee composed of Cody Allen, Bryan Shaw, Scott Atchison and Marc Rzepczynski in May.

=== Pittsburgh Pirates ===
Axford was claimed off waivers by the Pittsburgh Pirates on August 14, 2014. He was designated for assignment on October 25, 2014, and removed from the 40-man roster. He elected to become a free agent on November 3.

=== Colorado Rockies ===
Axford signed a minor league contract with the Colorado Rockies on January 30, 2015. He was added to the 40-man roster on March 1, when Tyler Chatwood was placed on the 60-day disabled list. After struggles from LaTroy Hawkins, setup man Adam Ottavino was appointed as the Rockies closer. When Ottavino tore his UCL and needed Tommy John surgery, Axford was named the closer for Colorado. Balls hit against him had the highest average exit velocity in the major leagues, at 90.6 miles per hour. Axford was designated for assignment by the Rockies after the season.

=== Oakland Athletics ===
On December 11, 2015, Axford signed a two-year, $10 million contract with the Oakland Athletics. In 2016, Axford appeared in 68 games, earning three saves in ten chances. He had a 3.97 ERA. He was designated for assignment on July 27, 2017, and released on August 1.

=== Toronto Blue Jays ===
On February 8, 2018, Axford signed a minor league contract with the Toronto Blue Jays with an invitation to spring training. His contract was purchased by the Blue Jays on March 29, 2018, and he was assigned to the Opening Day roster. On July 28, Axford made his first career start against the Chicago White Sox, becoming the sixth Canadian-born starter in franchise history. He faced the minimum over a career-high three innings, though the Blue Jays would end up losing the game 9–5.

=== Los Angeles Dodgers ===
On July 31, 2018, Axford was traded to the Los Angeles Dodgers in exchange for minor league pitcher Corey Copping. He only played in five games with the Dodgers, allowing seven earned runs in 3 2/3 innings.

=== Toronto Blue Jays (second stint) ===
On February 14, 2019, Axford signed a minor league contract to return to the Blue Jays. He was released on March 23 after suffering a stress reaction in his elbow. The following day, it was announced that he would undergo rehab and re-sign with the Blue Jays to a re-worked contract. On August 8, Axford had bone spurs removed from his pitching elbow. Axford only appeared in one rehab start with the rookie-level GCL Blue Jays before electing free agency on November 4, 2019.

After spending the 2020 season out of affiliated ball, Axford agreed to a contract to re-join the Blue Jays on June 20, 2021. He again pitched for their rookie-level team, renamed as the FCL Blue Jays, on June 28.

=== Milwaukee Brewers (second stint) ===
On August 2, 2021, Axford was traded to the Milwaukee Brewers in exchange for cash considerations. The Brewers then selected his contract. After pitching 1/3 of an inning in his return, Axford was removed from the game due to an injury. It was later revealed that Axford had significant structural damage in his right elbow and missed the remainder of the season. He became a free agent following the season.

On June 6, 2022, Axford announced on his personal Twitter account that he had resumed throwing for the first time since undergoing Tommy John surgery in September 2021.

On December 19, 2022, Axford announced that he would be playing for Team Canada in the 2023 World Baseball Classic.

On March 12, 2024, Axford announced his retirement from professional baseball.

== Scouting report ==
When Axford first entered the majors as the Brewers closer, he relied heavily (almost exclusively) on his power fastball, which is generally thrown around 96–98 miles per hour (154–158 km/h), but can reach as high as 100 miles per hour (160 km/h). Because of his height, the pitch is delivered on a downward plane, and is thrown with a peculiar arm snapping motion. Since then, his breaking pitches have become nearly as dominant as his fastball, and he now regularly throws a curveball at 79–80 miles per hour (127–129 km/h) with a sharp 12-to-6 break, as well as an 83–86-mile-per-hour (134–138 km/h) slider with a late, sharp break.

== Personal life ==
Axford received a bachelor's degree from Notre Dame in film and television. An avid film fan, Axford correctly predicted 14 of the 15 winners of the 2013 Oscar awards, and all eighteen winners in 2014 via his Twitter account. Making predictions in all 24 categories of the 2015 and 2016 Oscars, Axford successfully chose 17 winners in both years. In 2017, he improved upon this, making correct picks in 19 of the 24 categories at the 88th Academy Awards. Axford is involved in the annual Milwaukee Film Festival.

== See also ==
- List of Major League Baseball annual saves leaders
- List of Major League Baseball career saves leaders
