= Johnny Hellweg =

American baseball player (born 1988)

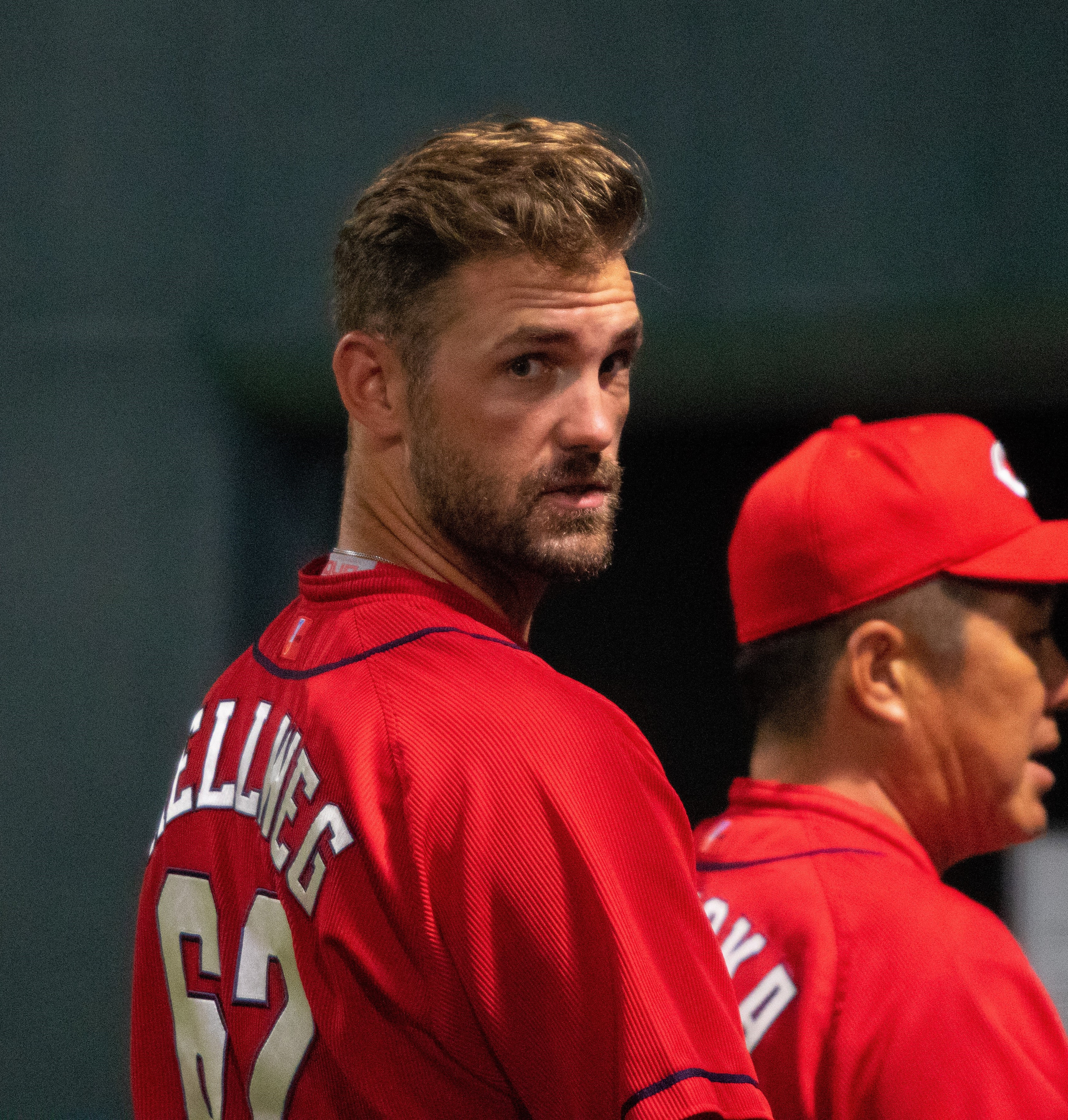
- Hellweg with the Hiroshima Toyo Carp in 2018
- Pitcher
- Born: October 29, 1988 (age 37); Ann Arbor, Michigan, U.S.
- Batted: Right Threw: Right

Professional debut
- MLB: June 28, 2013, for the Milwaukee Brewers
- NPB: 2018, for the Hiroshima Toyo Carp

Last appearance
- MLB: September 26, 2013, for the Milwaukee Brewers
- NPB: 2019, for the Hiroshima Toyo Carp

MLB statistics
- Win–loss record: 1–4
- Earned run average: 6.75
- Strikeouts: 9

NPB statistics
- Win–loss record: 1–0
- Earned run average: 0.77
- Strikeouts: 12
- Stats at Baseball Reference

Teams
- Milwaukee Brewers (2013); Hiroshima Toyo Carp (2018–2019)

John David Hellweg (born October 29, 1988) is an American former professional baseball pitcher. He has played in Major League Baseball (MLB) for the Milwaukee Brewers and for the Hiroshima Toyo Carp of Nippon Professional Baseball (NPB).

== Career ==
=== Los Angeles Angels ===
Hellweg attended St. Dominic High School in O'Fallon, Missouri, and Florida State College at Jacksonville. The Los Angeles Angels of Anaheim selected Hellweg in the 16th round of the 2008 MLB draft.

=== Milwaukee Brewers ===
The Angels traded Hellweg, Jean Segura, and Ariel Peña to the Milwaukee Brewers for Zack Greinke on July 27, 2012.

The Brewers promoted Hellweg to the majors for the first time on June 26, 2013. Hellweg made his Major League debut on June 28, 2013 against the Pittsburgh Pirates. During his debut, he pitched only 1 2/3 innings surrendering 7 runs (all in the 2nd inning). He finished the season with a 1–4 record and an unprecedented 9/26 SO/BB ratio.

Hellweg began the 2014 season as the opening day starter for the Brewers' Triple–A affiliate, the Nashville Sounds. After 4 starts though, Hellweg would miss the remainder of the season due to injury. Hellweg would return from injury in 2015 to pitch in 16 starts between the Double–A Biloxi Shuckers and High–A Brevard County Manatees. Through his 16 minor league starts, he was 1–10 with 52 walks in 61 innings. On November 2, 2015, Hellweg was removed from the 40–man roster and sent outright to the Triple–A Colorado Springs Sky Sox.

=== San Diego Padres ===
On November 26, 2015, Hellweg signed a minor league contract with the San Diego Padres. In 10 games (6 starts) split between the Double–A San Antonio Missions and Triple–A El Paso Chihuahuas, he struggled to a 10.95 ERA with 17 strikeouts across 24 2/3 innings pitched. Hellweg was released by the Padres organization on July 4, 2016.

=== New Jersey Jackals ===
On July 8, 2016, Hellweg signed a contract with the New Jersey Jackals of the Can-Am League.

=== Cincinnati Reds ===
On November 16, 2016, Hellweg signed a minor league contract with the Cincinnati Reds.

=== New Jersey Jackals (second stint) ===
In 2017, Hellweg pitched for the New Jersey Jackals of the Can-Am League. In 38 innings, Hellweg struck out 62 while only serving up 2 home runs.

=== Pittsburgh Pirates ===
On August 25, 2017, Hellweg signed a minor league contract with the Pittsburgh Pirates. He had four outings for the Double–A Altoona Curve down the stretch. In 2018, Hellweg made 24 appearances for the Triple–A Indianapolis Indians, compiling a 1.33 ERA with 25 strikeouts and 11 saves across 27 innings of work. On June 25, 2018, Hellweg was released so he could pursue an opportunity in Japan.

=== Hiroshima Toyo Carp ===
On June 26, 2018, Hellweg signed with the Hiroshima Toyo Carp of the Nippon Professional Baseball (NPB). He made 7 appearances for Hiroshima, compiling a 1.13 ERA with 10 strikeouts across 8 innings pitched.

Hellweg made five scoreless appearances for the Carp in 2019, striking out 2 in 3 2/3 innings of work. On December 2, 2019, he became a free agent.

=== St. Louis Cardinals ===
On January 30, 2020, Hellweg signed a minor league deal with the St. Louis Cardinals. He did not play in a game in 2020 due to the cancellation of the minor league season because of the COVID-19 pandemic. Hellweg was released by the Cardinals organization on May 27.

=== Long Island Ducks ===
On February 22, 2021, Hellweg signed with the Long Island Ducks of the Atlantic League of Professional Baseball. He became a free agent following the season.
