= Jim Henderson (baseball) =

Canadian baseball player (born 1982)

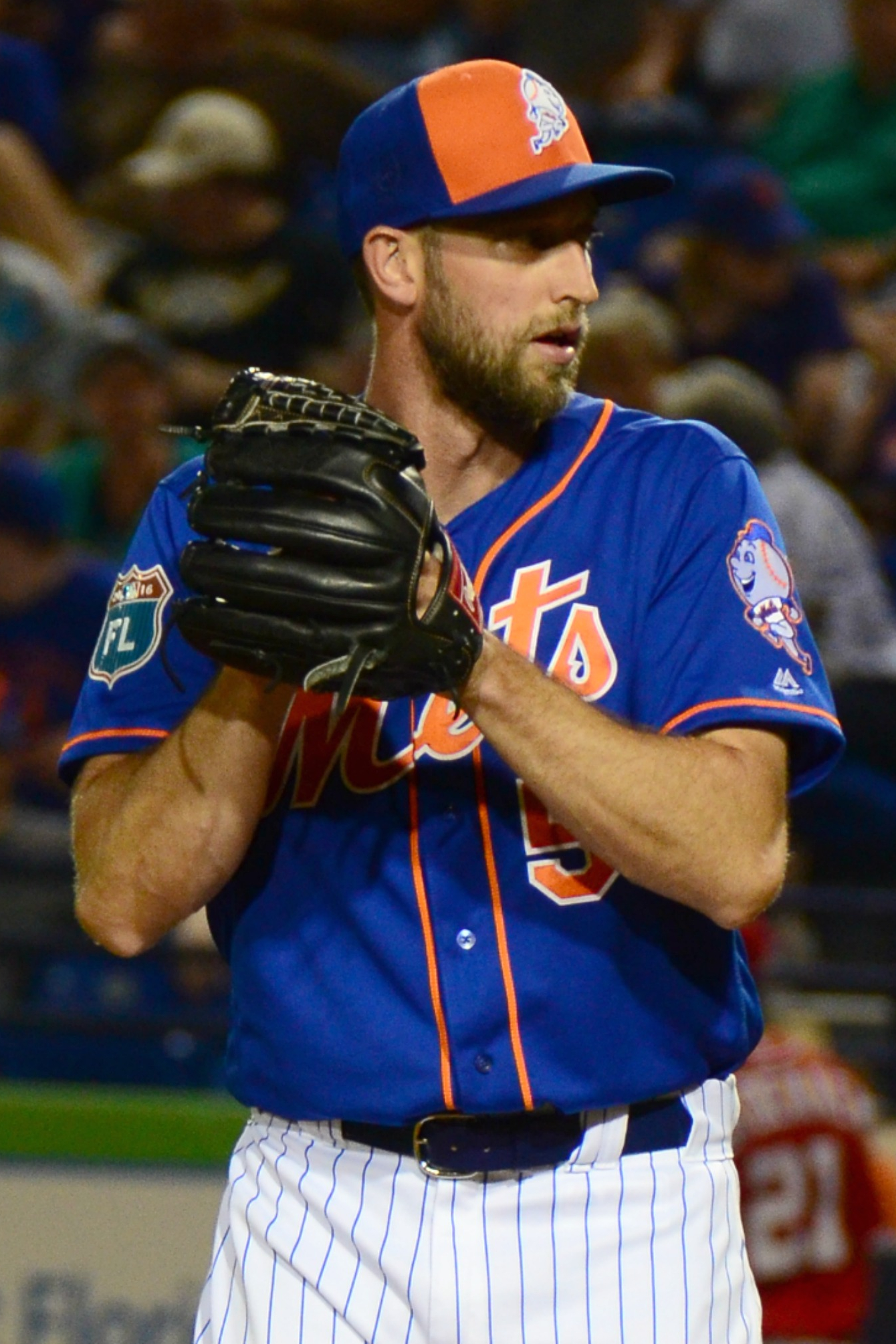
- Henderson with the New York Mets in 2016

Milwaukee Brewers – No. 71
- Pitcher
- Born: October 21, 1982 (age 44); Calgary, Alberta, Canada
- Batted: Right Threw: Right

MLB debut
- July 26, 2012, for the Milwaukee Brewers

Last MLB appearance
- October 2, 2016, for the New York Mets

MLB statistics
- Win–loss record: 10–11
- Earned run average: 3.61
- Strikeouts: 177
- Saves: 31
- Stats at Baseball Reference

Teams
- As player: Milwaukee Brewers (2012–2014); New York Mets (2016); As coach: Milwaukee Brewers (2022–present)

Career highlights and awards
- As coach: World Series champion (2026)
Medals
Men's baseball
Representing Canada
Baseball World Cup
Bronze medal – third place	2011 Panama City	Team
Pan American Games
Gold medal – first place	2011 Guadalajara	Team

James Duffy Henderson (born October 21, 1982) is a Canadian former professional baseball pitcher who currently serves as the pitching coordinator for the Milwaukee Brewers of Major League Baseball (MLB). He played in MLB for the Brewers and New York Mets.

== Early life ==
Henderson was born in Calgary, Alberta, to Marilyn and Neil Henderson, an auto mechanic at the University of Calgary. Henderson's father died as a result of Lou Gehrig's disease when Henderson was a teenager.

As a high school student, Henderson played summer baseball for the Okotoks Dawgs in Okotoks. He graduated from Bishop Carroll High School before playing two seasons at Midland College, a junior college in Texas, then moving on to Tennessee Wesleyan College and the Bulldogs of the National Association of Intercollegiate Athletics.

== Playing career ==
=== Montreal Expos/Washington Nationals (2003–2006) ===
Henderson was drafted by the Montreal Expos in the 26th round of the 2003 Major League Baseball draft. He made his professional debut that summer pitching out of the bullpen for the Rookie League Gulf Coast League Expos and Low-A Vermont Expos in the New York–Penn League. He played the entire 2004 season with Vermont and was promoted to the Single-A Savannah Sand Gnats of the South Atlantic League in 2005. After opening the 2006 season with the High-A Carolina League's Potomac Nationals, Henderson was sent back to Savannah for three games before returning to Potomac for the rest of the campaign.

=== Chicago Cubs (2007–2008) ===
The Chicago Cubs selected Henderson in the 2006 Rule 5 draft. He played the majority of 2007 with the Double-A Tennessee Smokies in the Southern League except for eight games in the middle of the season with the Triple-A Iowa Cubs in the Pacific Coast League. He began the 2008 season at Tennessee but was promoted to Iowa after five games. He pitched three games at Triple-A Iowa before a shoulder injury ended his season and resulted in his release from the Cubs organization in March 2009.

=== Milwaukee Brewers (2009–2015) ===
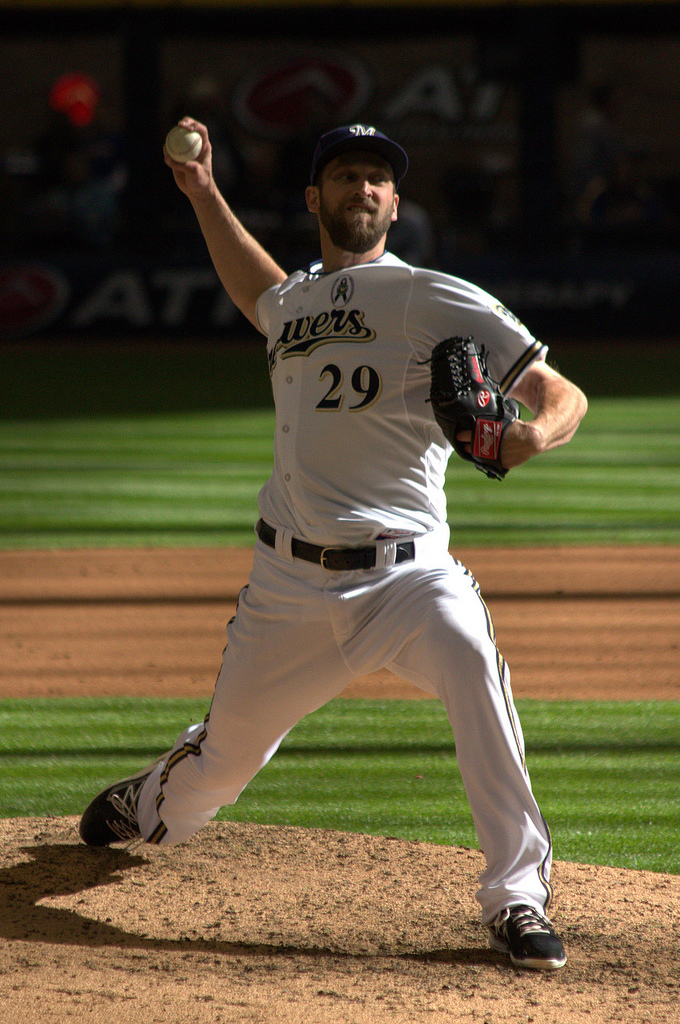
Henderson pitching for the Milwaukee Brewers in 2013

Henderson signed a minor league contract with the Milwaukee Brewers before the start of the 2009 season. He played the majority of that year with the Class A Wisconsin Timber Rattlers in the Midwest League but was promoted to the Florida State League's Class A-Advanced Brevard County Manatees midseason and the Double-A Southern League's Huntsville Stars in August. Over 26 appearances for Wisconsin, Henderson held 1.07 earned run average (ERA) with 26 strikeouts in 25 1/3 innings, which earned him a spot in the 2009 Midwest League All-Star Game. He played the entire 2010 season with Huntsville after which he became a free agent. After re-signing with the Brewers, he split the 2011 campaign between Huntsville and the Triple-A Nashville Sounds in the Pacific Coast League.

After ten years in the minors, Henderson earned his first promotion to MLB when the Milwaukee Brewers summoned him from Nashville on July 26, 2012, making his major league debut that night against the Washington Nationals, pitching one inning and striking out the first batter he faced, Roger Bernadina. At Nashville, he was selected for the Triple-A All-Star Game with a 1.69 ERA, 56 strikeouts, 4 wins, and 15 saves as the Sounds' closer.

In 2013, Henderson replaced struggling fellow Canadian-born John Axford as the Brewers' closer. Henderson went 5–5 with a 2.70 ERA while collecting 28 saves in 32 opportunities. His fastball had high velocity, reaching up to 98 mph (158 km/h), and he established his slider as a strikeout pitch, which established him as a strikeout pitcher, finishing the season with an 11.3 K/9. Francisco Rodríguez closed while Henderson was on the disabled list (DL) with a hamstring strain, but Henderson regained the role after Rodriguez was traded to the Baltimore Orioles.

Henderson won the Brewers closer job for 2014 out of spring training despite experiencing a loss in velocity. This was later revealed to be caused by right shoulder inflammation, and he went on the 15-day DL in April after compiling a 7.15 ERA in 14 games pitched. Henderson was later transferred to the 60-day DL following a minor league rehab assignment, and he ended up missing the rest of the season after having shoulder surgery in August.

Still seeking to reclaim his lost velocity after his 2014 shoulder surgery, Henderson was outrighted to the Triple-A Colorado Springs Sky Sox on May 21, 2015. He spent over a month on the DL at Colorado Springs and elected to become a free agent after the season.

=== New York Mets (2016) ===
Henderson signed a minor league contract with the New York Mets for 2015 that included an invitation to spring training. He made the Mets' roster for Opening Day in 2016 after a spring training in which he posted a 1.69 ERA with 13 strikeouts over 10 2/3 innings beating out Sean Gilmartin for the last spot in the Mets' bullpen. On June 21, he was placed on the DL with tendinitis in his right biceps. After 14 minor league rehab appearances, mostly with the Triple-A Las Vegas 51s, he was activated from the DL and added to the active roster on August 20. He was outrighted to Triple-A after the season and elected free agency.

=== Chicago Cubs (2017) ===
Henderson signed a minor league contract with the Chicago Cubs for 2017 with an invitation to spring training, but he was released before the season's start.

=== Milwaukee Brewers (2018) ===
In 2018, Henderson signed a minor league contract with the Milwaukee Brewers. He was assigned to the Double-A Biloxi Shuckers in the Southern League and placed on the 60-Day DL. He was released after the season without having appeared in any games.

== Coaching career ==
During the 2018 season, while he was on the Biloxi 60-Day DL, Henderson assisted in Milwaukee's scouting department and served as the bullpen coach for Milwaukee's Low-A affiliate, the Helena Brewers of the Pioneer League. In 2019, Henderson worked as the pitching coach for the Single-A Wisconsin Timber Rattlers. Before the cancellation of the 2020 minor league season, he was slated to be the pitching coach for the Brewers' Triple-A affiliate, the San Antonio Missions. Henderson began serving as pitching coach for the Brewers' new Triple-A affiliate, the Nashville Sounds, in 2021.

Henderson was promoted to Milwaukee's major league coaching staff to serve as their bullpen coach beginning in the 2022 season. On January 5, 2026, Henderson was promoted to the role of pitching coordinator.

== International competition ==
Henderson was a member of the gold medal winning Canadian national baseball team at the 2011 Pan American Games. In recognition of the victory, the team was inducted into the Canadian Baseball Hall of Fame in 2012.
