= 1988 in baseball =

The following are the baseball events of the year 1988 throughout the world.

== Champions ==
=== Major League Baseball ===
- World Series: Los Angeles Dodgers over Oakland Athletics (4–1); Orel Hershiser, MVP

League Championship Series (ALCS, NLCS)
East	Boston	0
West	Oakland	4
East	NY Mets	3
West	Los Angeles	4

World Series
AL	Oakland	1
NL	Los Angeles	4

- American League Championship Series MVP: Dennis Eckersley
- National League Championship Series MVP: Orel Hershiser
- All-Star Game, July 12 at Riverfront Stadium: American League, 2–1; Terry Steinbach, MVP

=== Other champions ===
- Baseball World Cup: Cuba
- Caribbean World Series: Leones del Escogido (Dominican Republic)
- College World Series: Stanford
- Japan Series: Seibu Lions over Chunichi Dragons (4–1)
- Korean Series: Haitai Tigers over Binggrae Eagles
- Big League World Series: Taipei, Taiwan
- Junior League World Series: Mexicali, Mexico
- Little League World Series: Tai Ping, Taichung, Taiwan
- Senior League World Series: Pingtung, Taiwan
- Summer Olympic Games at Seoul, South Korea (demonstration sport): United States (1st), Japan (2nd), Puerto Rico (3rd)

== Awards and honors ==
- Baseball Hall of Fame
  - Willie Stargell
- Most Valuable Player
  - Jose Canseco, Oakland Athletics, OF (AL)
  - Kirk Gibson, Los Angeles Dodgers, OF (NL)
- Cy Young Award
  - Frank Viola, Minnesota Twins (AL)
  - Orel Hershiser, Los Angeles Dodgers (NL)
- Rookie of the Year
  - Walt Weiss, Oakland Athletics, SS (AL)
  - Chris Sabo, Cincinnati Reds, 3B (NL)
- Manager of the Year Award
  - Tony La Russa, Oakland Athletics (AL)
  - Tommy Lasorda, Los Angeles Dodgers (NL)
- Woman Executive of the Year (major or minor league): Mindy Rich, Buffalo Bisons, American Association
- Gold Glove Award
  - Don Mattingly (1B) (AL)
  - Harold Reynolds (2B) (AL)
  - Gary Gaetti (3B) (AL)
  - Tony Fernández (SS) (AL)
  - Kirby Puckett (OF) (AL)
  - Gary Pettis (OF) (AL)
  - Devon White (OF) (AL)
  - Bob Boone (C) (AL)
  - Mark Langston (P) (AL)

== MLB statistical leaders ==
	American League		National League
Type	Name	Stat	Name	Stat
AVG	Wade Boggs BOS	.366	Tony Gwynn SD	.313
HR	Jose Canseco OAK	42	Darryl Strawberry NYM	39
RBI	Jose Canseco OAK	124	Will Clark SF	109
Wins	Frank Viola MIN	24	Orel Hershiser LAD; Danny Jackson CIN	23
ERA	Allan Anderson MIN	2.45	Joe Magrane STL	2.18

== Major League Baseball final standings ==
American League
Rank	Club	Wins	Losses	Win %	GB
East Division
1st	Boston Red Sox	89	73	.549	–
2nd	Detroit Tigers	88	74	.543	1.0
3rd	Milwaukee Brewers	87	75	.537	2.0
3rd	Toronto Blue Jays	87	75	.537	2.0
5th	New York Yankees	85	76	.528	3.5
6th	Cleveland Indians	78	84	.481	11.0
7th	Baltimore Orioles	54	107	.335	34.5
West Division
1st	Oakland Athletics	104	58	.642	–
2nd	Minnesota Twins	91	71	.562	13.0
3rd	Kansas City Royals	84	77	.522	19.5
4th	California Angels	75	87	.463	29.0
5th	Chicago White Sox	71	90	.441	32.5
6th	Texas Rangers	70	91	.435	33.5
7th	Seattle Mariners	68	93	.422	35.5

National League
Rank	Club	Wins	Losses	Win %	GB
East Division
1st	New York Mets	100	60	.625	–
2nd	Pittsburgh Pirates	85	75	.531	15.0
3rd	Montreal Expos	81	81	.500	20.0
4th	Chicago Cubs	77	85	.475	24.0
5th	St. Louis Cardinals	76	86	.469	25.0
6th	Philadelphia Phillies	65	96	.404	35.5
West Division
1st	Los Angeles Dodgers	94	67	.584	–
2nd	Cincinnati Reds	87	74	.540	7.0
3rd	San Diego Padres	83	78	.516	11.0
4th	San Francisco Giants	83	79	.512	11.5
5th	Houston Astros	82	80	.506	12.5
6th	Atlanta Braves	54	106	.338	40

== Events ==
=== January ===
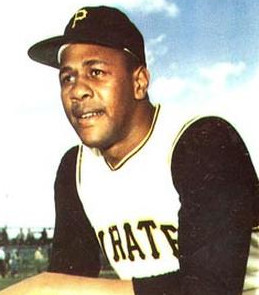
Willie Stargell in 1966

- January 4:
  - First baseman Bob Horner, 30, a member of the November 1986 "Collusion II" class of free agents, rejoins the majors after spending the 1987 season in Japan, signing with the St. Louis Cardinals; 1988 will be Horner's final season in "Organized Baseball."
  - The defending World Series champion Minnesota Twins sign free-agent catcher Brian Harper, 28, released by the Oakland Athletics last October 12. Harper will bat .306 in 730 games over the next six seasons with the Twins, and earn a World Series ring.
- January 5:
  - The Milwaukee Brewers and their future Hall-of-Fame third baseman, Paul Molitor, agree on a new, two-year contract worth up to $3.7 million. Molitor, 31, batted .353 in 1987; his 39-game hitting streak was the American League's longest since Joe DiMaggio's fabled 56-game skein 46 years earlier. He had been granted free agency on November 9, 1987.
  - Right-hander Don Sutton, 42, himself a future Hall of Famer, returns to his original team, the Los Angeles Dodgers, on a one-year contract; he had been released by the California Angels last October 30. Sutton won 230 games and was a four-time All-Star as a Dodger between 1966 and 1980.
  - The Boston Red Sox sign 12-year veteran relief pitcher Dennis Lamp, granted free agency from the Oakland Athletics last October 19.
- January 6 – In a move that "shatters the two-year calm" in free agency since the dawn of the collusion era in November 1985, the New York Yankees sign National League slugger Jack Clark to a two-year contract worth as much as $4 million with incentives. First baseman Clark, 32, is a 4x All-Star who'll be the Yanks' designated hitter in 1988. He had been granted free agency from the St. Louis Cardinals last November 9.
- January 7:
  - The Minnesota Twins re-sign All-Star, Gold Glove Award-winning third baseman Gary Gaetti, 29, voted MVP of the 1987 ALCS, granted free agency last November 9. He signs a three-year $4.3 million contract.
  - The Kansas City Royals re-sign 16-game-winning left-hander Charlie Leibrandt, 31, a November 9 free agent, to a two-year contract.
- January 8:
  - On deadline day for November 9's free agents to sign with their 1987 teams—or wait until May 1 to do so—the Houston Astros come to terms with three important members of their 1987 pitching staff, retaining starter Danny Darwin, set-up man Larry Andersen, and ace closer Dave Smith.
  - The New York Yankees, however, lose free agent starting pitcher Bill Gullickson to the Yomiuri Giants of Nippon Professional Baseball; he rejects the Bombers' two-year, $1.8 million offer and signs with the Japanese team for two years and $3.3 million.
- January 12:
  - Former Pittsburgh Pirates slugger Willie Stargell is the only player elected to the Hall of Fame by the Baseball Writers' Association of America. Stargell becomes the 17th player to be elected in his first year of eligibility. Pitcher Jim Bunning garners 317 votes (74.2%), and falls four votes shy of the 321 needed for election in his 13th year on the ballot.
  - The Milwaukee Brewers unconditionally release five-time AL All-Star Cecil Cooper, ending the 38-year-old first baseman's 17-year MLB playing career.
- January 15 – The New York Yankees sign 13-year MLB veteran southpaw John Candelaria, granted free agency from the New York Mets on November 9.
- January 19 – For the third consecutive off-season, the Major League Baseball Players Association files a collusion-related grievance, alleging that the 26 team owners are illegally working together to depress player salaries; "Collusion III" deals with an "information bank" the owners have created to compare salary offers being made to free agents.
- January 22:
  - Four months after he ruled in favor of the MLBPA in its "Collusion I" grievance, arbitrator Thomas T. Roberts declares seven players no-risk, "new-look" free agents, enabling them to sign with competing clubs despite their already having contracts. The seven are Juan Beníquez, Tom Brookens, Carlton Fisk, Kirk Gibson, Donnie Moore, Joe Niekro and Butch Wynegar. All were members of the "Class of 1985," granted freedom by the CBA to "test the market," but who encountered the owners' "gentleman's agreement" to restrict player movement, salaries and contract terms.
  - Catcher Lance Parrish returns to the Philadelphia Phillies on a one-year, $1 million contract. Last year, Parrish was one of seven marquee members of free-agency's "Class of 1986" whose negotiations were affected by owner collusion.
- January 25 – Veteran outfielder Juan Beníquez is the first of January 22's "new-look" free agents to negotiate a new contract—although he remains with the Toronto Blue Jays.
- January 29 – One week after being declared a new-look free agent, outfielder Kirk Gibson abandons the Detroit Tigers to sign a three-year, $4.5 million contract with the Los Angeles Dodgers. Gibson, 30, will have a massive impact on the 1988 Dodgers, winning the National League MVP Award, authoring one of the most dramatic moments in World Series history, and earning his second career world-championship ring.

=== February ===
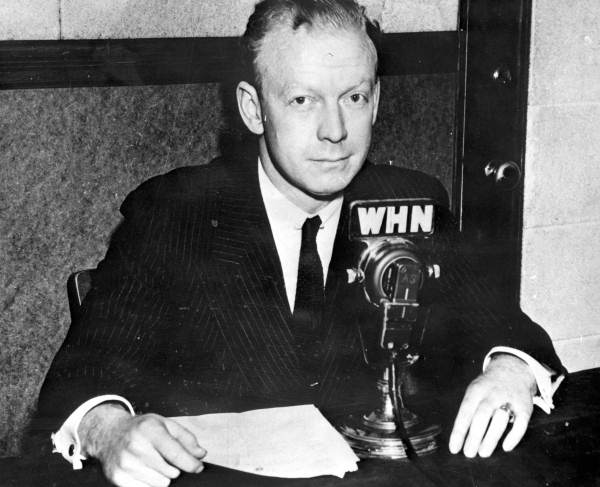
Red Barber in 1943

- February 9:
  - New-look free agents Tom Brookens, Carlton Fisk, Donnie Moore, Joe Niekro and Butch Wynegar sign new contracts to return to their 1987 teams.
  - The St. Louis Cardinals obtain right-hander José DeLeón from the Chicago White Sox for southpaw Ricky Horton, outfielder Lance Johnson and cash.
  - The Oakland Athletics sign DH Don Baylor, unconditionally released by the Minnesota Twins last December 21.
- February 12 – The Chicago Cubs trade infielder Mike Brumley and outfielder Keith Moreland to the San Diego Padres in exchange for pitchers Goose Gossage and Ray Hayward.
- February 15 – The Cincinnati Reds trade pitcher Jeff Montgomery to the Kansas City Royals for outfielder Van Snider.
- February 17 – In Tallahassee, Florida, legendary broadcaster Red Barber, enshrined in Cooperstown as one of the first winners of the Ford C. Frick Award, is honored on his 80th birthday by the state where he grew up. He's lauded by Howard Cosell as a man who "always told it like it is."
- February 18:
  - Veteran southpaw starter Frank Tanana, a 15-game winner in 1987, wins his arbitration case and returns to the Detroit Tigers; he had been granted free agency November 9 and opted for arbitration.
  - The Kansas City Royals sign first baseman/DH Steve Balboni as a free agent, after unconditionally releasing him last December 21.
- February 20 – The Tigers sign outfielder/third baseman Luis Salazar, granted free agency from the San Diego Padres last October 20.
- February 25 – Outfielder José Cruz, 40, a two-time NL All-Star who has spent the 14 seasons with the Houston Astros, signs with the New York Yankees. He had been granted free agency last November 9.
- February 26 – Despite bitter neighborhood opposition, the Chicago City Council votes 29–19 to allow night baseball at 72-year-old Wrigley Field this coming season. The Cubs will be permitted to host eight night games in 1988, and 18 from 1989 through 2002. In response, MLB magnates award Wrigley the 1990 All-Star Game, which will be played under the lights.
- February 27 – The Baltimore Orioles trade third baseman Ray Knight to the Detroit Tigers for pitcher Mark Thurmond.
- February 28 – The Cleveland Indians sign 28-year-old outfielder/first baseman/DH Terry Francona, granted free agency from the Cincinnati Reds last November 2. Francona, whose father, Tito, was a Cleveland stalwart from 1959–1964, will return there in 2013 to manage the Indians/Guardians for 11 seasons, winning 921 games—the most of any skipper in the club's 125-year history—and the 2016 American League pennant.

=== March ===
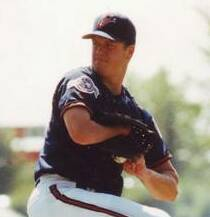
Jim Abbott in 1998

- March 1 – For the first time since 1956, the Special Veterans Committee does not elect anyone to the Hall of Fame. Phil Rizzuto, Leo Durocher, Joe Gordon and Gil Hodges are among the candidates passed over.
- March 7:
  - Jim Abbott, a junior left-handed pitcher for the University of Michigan who was born without a right hand, wins the James E. Sullivan Award as 1987's top amateur athlete in the U.S. Abbott, now 20, will forge a ten-year MLB career beginning in 1989 and win 87 games.
  - American League umpires, instructed to more strictly enforce the balk rule during the coming season, call 12 such infractions in an exhibition game between the Texas Rangers and Toronto Blue Jays. Knuckleballer Charlie Hough commits nine balks in only four innings of work—including seven in the second.
- March 11 – Veteran manager Gene Mauch, 62, takes an abrupt medical leave from the California Angels' spring training camp for treatment of bronchitis; he will formally retire from managing on March 26. Advance scout and former MLB second baseman Cookie Rojas, 49, takes his place. Mauch spent 26 seasons as a big-league skipper for four clubs; his teams never won a pennant.
- March 17:
  - A study commissioned by the players' union and presented in a remedy hearing before arbitrator Thomas Roberts claims that major-league players have lost between $70 million and $90 million in salaries to owners' collusion in 1986 and 1987.
  - A little over a month after being acquired from the San Diego Padres, pitcher Ray Hayward is on the move again. The Cubs trade the left-hander to the Texas Rangers in exchange for infielder Greg Tabor and outfielder Dave Meier.
- March 21 – The Baltimore Orioles trade outfielder Mike Young and a player to be named later (minor-league outfielder Frank Bellino) to the Philadelphia Phillies for third baseman Rick Schu and outfielders Keith Hughes and Jeff Stone. Young, 28, slugged 45 home runs during his first two seasons with Baltimore (1984–1985), but injuries and inconsistency have derailed his career.
- March 24 – The Montreal Expos purchase the contract of third baseman Graig Nettles from the Atlanta Braves. Nettles, 43 and a 21-year MLB veteran, filed for bankruptcy last month in his native city of San Diego.
- March 25 – The Toronto Blue Jays sell the contract of first baseman Willie Upshaw to the Cleveland Indians.
- March 29 – The Chicago White Sox sign 38-year-old southpaw Jerry Reuss, granted free agency from the California Angels last November 9. Reuss will go 13–9 (3.44) in 32 games for the 1988 ChiSox in his 20th MLB season.
- March 30 – After a month-long spring training trial, the Los Angeles Dodgers sign free-agent catcher Rick Dempsey, a San Fernando Valley native and 19-year MLB veteran who was the MVP of the 1983 World Series during his long stint with the Baltimore Orioles. Dempsey, 38, will be a prominent member of "The Stuntmen," the 1988 Dodgers' bench players who'll help fuel the club's drive to the World Series championship.

=== April ===
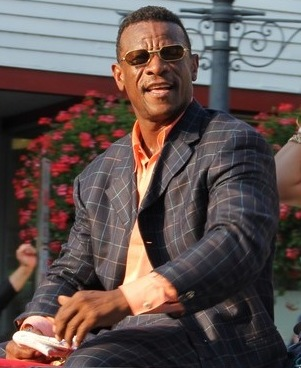
Rickey Henderson in 2011

- April 4:
  - Toronto Blue Jays slugger George Bell, last year's American League Most Valuable Player, drills three home runs on Opening Day—the first man in MLB history to achieve that milestone—to key a 5–3 victory over the host Kansas City Royals. Bell is also one of only two major leaguers (José Canseco will be the other) to homer three times in a game this season. Two days from now, in the Jays' second contest of 1988, Bell goes five-for-five with two doubles, becoming the first of 23 players to collect five hits in a game this year.
  - The New York Mets blast six homers off Montreal Expos pitchers in a 10–6, Opening Day victory at Olympic Stadium. Darryl Strawberry hits two of the long balls, including a tape-measure shot, estimated at 525 feet (160 m), that hits a concrete ring high above right field that supports the domed stadium's roof.
- April 8 – The 1988 MLB season, only five days old, sees its first brawl when a long-simmering feud between Texas Rangers southpaw Mitch Williams, nicknamed "The Wild Thing," and the Boston Red Sox boils over during Boston's 4–0 victory at Arlington Stadium. The inciting incident is Williams' brushback pitch delivered to Wade Boggs in the ninth inning. Boggs is unscathed and draws a walk, but after teammate Marty Barrett scores a run one batter later, Barrett confronts Williams at the mound and the two trade punches. Williams is ejected (and later suspended by the American League), along with Boston's Dwight Evans, but Barrett stays in the game.
- April 11 – Rickey Henderson of the New York Yankees steals four bases in a 17–9 loss to Toronto at Exhibition Stadium, notching the first of three four-theft days of his 1988 campaign. The Hall of Famer will also steal three bags in seven more games, and win his eighth AL stolen-base crown (with 93) by year's end.
- April 12 – The Baltimore Orioles dismiss manager Cal Ripken Sr. after their sixth consecutive loss to start the season. He's replaced by Frank Robinson, who will see the winless streak extended to an MLB-record 21 consecutive games. All-time Orioles great and future Hall of Famer Robinson, 52, becomes MLB's first Black manager since he himself was dismissed by the San Francisco Giants on August 4, 1984.
- April 14 – Pilot Field opens in Buffalo as home to the Triple-A Buffalo Bisons. The first retro-classic ballpark in the world, the stadium was built to try to attract a major league franchise.
- April 15 – The Boston Red Sox sign veteran catcher Rick Cerone, unconditionally released by the New York Yankees April 4.
- April 22 – The Minnesota Twins and St. Louis Cardinals, combatants in last year's World Series, exchange starting players with Minnesota acquiring second baseman Tom Herr from the NL champs for right fielder Tom Brunansky.
- April 28 – The Hall-of-Fame MLB career of Steve Carlton ends when the 43-year-old hurler, author of 329 victories, is released by the Twins.
- April 29 – The Baltimore Orioles shut out the Chicago White Sox, 9–0, at Comiskey Park, for their first victory of 1988 after 21 consecutive losses. Starter Mark Williamson is credited with the win (allowing three hits, with two strikeouts and no walks in six innings); he and closer Dave Schmidt, who earns the save (one hit allowed, with one strikeout and no walks in three innings), keep Chicago scoreless. Two future Hall of Famers—Cal Ripken Jr. (4-for-5, including a double and a home run) and Eddie Murray (two-run homer)—pace the offense.
- April 30:
  - At Riverfront Stadium, in the ninth inning of a game already marked by a bench-clearing brawl involving Cincinnati Reds pitcher Tom Browning and the New York Mets' Darryl Strawberry, Cincinnati manager Pete Rose and umpire Dave Pallone engage in a physical altercation after a delayed "safe" call by first-base arbiter Pallone enables the Mets' Howard Johnson to score the eventual winning run all the way from second base. During the ensuing argument, Pallone allegedly pokes Rose under the eye, and the Reds' manager responds by shoving Pallone twice. Home fans shower the umpires with debris, forcing them to temporarily exit the field.
    - Two days from today, National League president A. Bartlett Giamatti suspends Rose for 30 days, the longest such penalty for an on-field incident levied on a manager in MLB history; Rose is also fined $10,000.
    - Former Reds' second baseman Tommy Helms, now their first-base coach, becomes acting manager until Rose's reinstatement June 1; Cincinnati goes 12–15 under Helms from May 2–31.
  - Dave Winfield, his name prominent in trade talks, drives in two runs and helps his New York Yankees rout the visiting Texas Rangers, 15–3. With 29 RBIs in 23 games, Winfield ties Ron Cey (1977 in 20 games) and Dale Murphy (1985 in 19 games) for most runs driven in during the month of April; he's also batting .398.

=== May ===
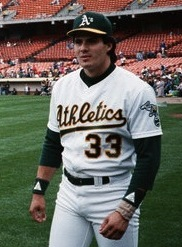
José Canseco

- May 2:
  - Cincinnati Reds pitcher Ron Robinson, one out away from a perfect game, surrenders a single to Wallace Johnson and a home run to Tim Raines, before Cincinnati finally beats the Montreal Expos, 3–2. John Franco secures the final out to get the save.
  - The Baltimore Orioles release former All-Star pitcher Scott McGregor, ending his comeback bid.
- May 7 – Trouble finds Billy Martin again when the New York Yankees' manager sustains a 40-stitch cut inside his left ear during an early-hours fight in the restroom of an Arlington, Texas, nightclub. Martin, who will turn 60 on May 16, is held for observation in a local hospital, but discharged in time for him to manage tonight's game, a 3–2 defeat inflicted by the Texas Rangers.
- May 9:
  - The Oakland Athletics win their 14th consecutive game, defeating the visiting Detroit Tigers, 3–1, behind the pitching of Bob Welch and Dennis Eckersley and José Canseco's ninth home run of 1988. Oakland (24–7) has built an eight-game lead in the American League West. The A's winning streak is the majors' longest since 1977.
  - Bill Buckner, 38, is given his outright release by the California Angels; he'll sign as a free agent with the Kansas City Royals four days from now.
- May 10 – Three days after signing as a free agent, first baseman Chris Chambliss is released by the New York Yankees.
- May 14 – At Busch Memorial Stadium, infielder José Oquendo of the St. Louis Cardinals becomes the first non-pitcher to gain a decision since outfielder Rocky Colavito on August 25, 1968. The Atlanta Braves beat the Cardinals, 7–5, in 19 innings in MLB's longest game, by innings, of 1988. The Redbirds' eighth pitcher of the game, Oquendo hurls three scoreless frames before he surrenders the game-winning hit to Ken Griffey Sr.
- May 19:
  - A plethora of heavy rainstorms has led to a bumper crop of postponed baseball games, schedule and travel disruptions, impromptu doubleheaders, and make-up dates. So far in 1988, in six weeks, 28 MLB games have been rain-outs—one more than in all of 1987. Even Los Angeles, known for dry springs and summers, is not immune: the Dodgers had three consecutive home games washed out in April, a first since the club moved West in 1958.
  - To make room for top prospect Mark Grace, the Chicago Cubs trade first baseman Leon Durham to the Cincinnati Reds for pitcher Pat Perry and cash considerations.
- May 22:
  - The Atlanta Braves fire manager Chuck Tanner after a 12–27 start and replace him with Russ Nixon, promoted from Double-A Greenville. The firing ends Tanner's 19-year MLB managerial career; his Atlanta record is only 153–208 (.424).
  - Pedro Guerrero of the Los Angeles Dodgers flings his bat at New York Mets hurler David Cone after Cone brushes back Guerrero then hits him with a pitch during the same at bat. A full-scale brawl does not ensue, but Guerrero is ejected by home-plate umpire John Kibler, then fined by the National League office.
- May 25 – The Texas Rangers unconditionally release former All-Star outfielder Steve Kemp, 33, whose productive and promising early career was ruined by injuries.
- May 28 – With the San Diego Padres (16–30) battling the Braves for last place in the NL West, general manager "Trader Jack" McKeon fires second-year pilot Larry Bowa and takes the reins of the team himself. Multi-tasker McKeon will pull the Padres out of their doldrums; they'll post a 67–48 mark through the remainder of 1988.
- May 30 – Lou Piniella quits as general manager of the New York Yankees, a job he's held for only seven months. Amid rumors he may return to the managing ranks, with the Philadelphia Phillies if not the Yankees themselves, he'll stay on with the Bombers performing undisclosed duties. Bob Quinn, a Yankee vice president, will succeed Piniella in the GM role, although owner George Steinbrenner dominates the team's baseball decisions.

=== June ===
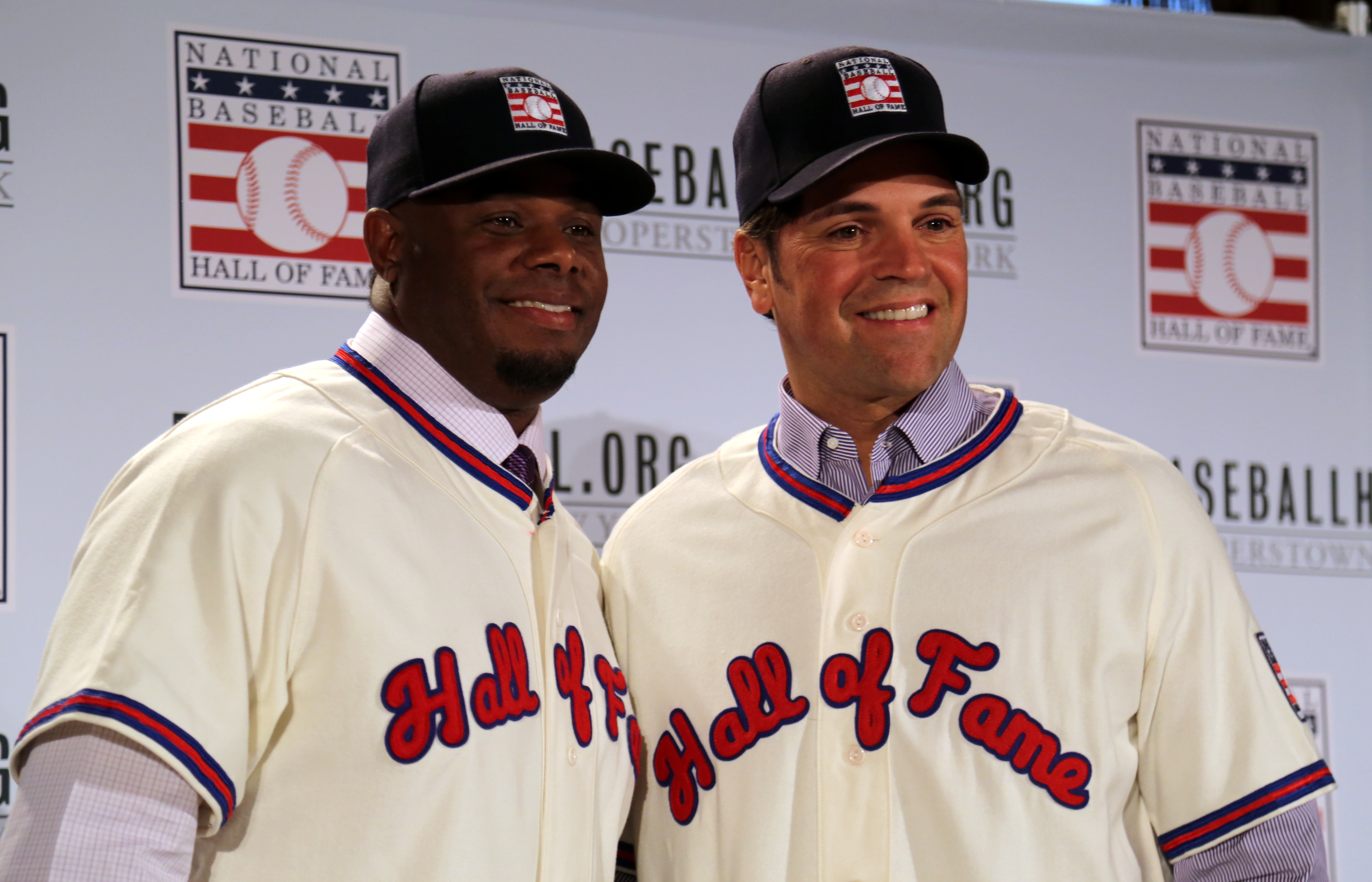
2016 Hall of Fame inductees Ken Griffey Jr. (left) and Mike Piazza

- June 1 – The San Diego Padres select 21-year-old right-hander Andy Benes of the University of Evansville as the first overall selection in the 1988 MLB amateur draft. One of eight future All-Stars taken in the first round, he'll win 155 MLB games over a 14-season career.
  - As a favor to Tom Lasorda, the Los Angeles Dodgers select Miami–Dade Community College first baseman Mike Piazza, 19, in the 62nd round. The 1,390th player chosen in the lottery—considered a "non-prospect"—Piazza is drafted at Lasorda's request because the Dodger manager is friendly with the player's father, who hails from his home town. Converting to catcher in the minor leagues, Piazza will graduate to the Dodgers in 1992, then win the National League Rookie of the Year Award in 1993; by the time he retires in May 2008 as a 12-time All-Star, he will have set the career MLB record for home runs by a receiver (396) and batted .308 lifetime. He'll be inducted into the Hall of Fame in 2016.
  - The California Angels select left-hander Jim Abbott of the Michigan Wolverines, who was born without a right hand, with their first pick, eighth overall; he signs with the Angels August 3. Abbott defers the beginning of his pro career to join the U.S. Olympic baseball team for the 1988 Seoul summer games, where baseball is a "demonstration sport."
- June 3:
  - Furious at American League president Bobby Brown's "lenient" treatment of Billy Martin, the league's umpires publicly threaten to take punishment into their own hands. The New York Yankees' volatile manager is beginning a three-day suspension for throwing and kicking dirt on arbiter Dale Scott in late May. Says their union chief, Richie Phillips: "[Martin is] going to have to behave like an altar boy ... Otherwise, he's going to be ejected, ejected, ejected, ejected."
  - The Cleveland Indians trade first baseman Pat Tabler to the Kansas City Royals in exchange for pitcher Bud Black.
- June 6 – The Seattle Mariners (23–33) fire old-school, hard-nosed Dick Williams, their manager since May 9, 1986. His dismissal ends Williams' Hall-of-Fame managerial career after 21 seasons, 1,563 regular-season wins, four pennants, and two World Series championships. Coach Jim Snyder will serve as interim skipper for the remainder of 1988.
- June 7 – Commissioner of Baseball Peter Ueberroth, in office for less than four years, announces he won't seek re-election when his term expires on March 31, 1989. He will leave a mixed legacy: negotiating new television contracts that will funnel $1.5 billion into owners' coffers and enable all 26 clubs to turn a profit or break even, but inspiring the ill-conceived owner conspiracy to illegally limit salaries and player movement that will cost them $434 million in collusion penalties, and plant the seeds for the disastrous 1994–1995 player strike.
- June 8:
  - Philadelphia Phillies club president Bill Giles dismisses general manager Woody Woodward, on the job for only seven months himself, for what Woodward describes as "philosophical differences." The Phillies receive permission from the division-rival St. Louis Cardinals to speak with their director of player development, Lee Thomas, about the opening and they will hire Thomas, 52, as vice president, player personnel, later this month.
  - The San Francisco Giants trade veteran outfielder Jeffrey Leonard, reigning NLCS MVP, to the Milwaukee Brewers of the American League for infielder Ernest Riles. Leonard, 32, is due to become a free agent in November.
- June 12:
  - Against the Atlanta Braves at the Astrodome, Houston's Mike Scott's a bid for a second career no-hitter is broken up with two out in the ninth by Ken Oberkfell's single. Oberkfell's is the only one Scott allows in a 5–0 Astros victory. Scott had no-hit the San Francisco Giants in 1986 on September 25.
  - Robin Yount hits for the cycle and scores four runs and leads his Milwaukee Brewers to a 16–2 blowout win over the Chicago White Sox at Comiskey Park.
- June 18 – The Los Angeles Dodgers sign 16-year-old right-hander Pedro Martínez of Manoguayabo, Dominican Republic, as an international free agent. Pedro's brother Ramón, 20, is one of the Dodgers' top pitching prospects and he will make his National League debut this coming August.
- June 19 – The Boston Red Sox rip 23 base hits—most in a game by any team in 1988—and outscore the Baltimore Orioles, 15–7, at Memorial Stadium. For the home side, Eddie Murray slugs his 314th career homer, temporarily tying him for second place with Reggie Smith among MLB switch-hitters. He remains far behind the all-time leader, Mickey Mantle, who hit 536.
- June 20 – The Cincinnati Reds release pitcher Mario Soto.
- June 21 – With his team trailing 6–3 in the bottom of the ninth at Tiger Stadium against the New York Yankees, Alan Trammell hits an "ultimate walk-off grand slam" (with two outs and his team down by three runs) off reliever Cecilio Guante. Trammell becomes the first, however, in major league history to do so with a 3–2 (three ball, two strike) count on him.
- June 23 – Billy Martin is fired from his fifth stint as New York Yankees manager by owner George Steinbrenner after a four-game losing streak, a 2–7 road trip, and losing a power struggle with the Bombers' front office; his club is 40–28, second in the AL East, 2½ games behind the Detroit Tigers. The firing, followed 18 months from now by his sudden death on Christmas Day 1989, will bring an end to Martin's 16-season managerial career; his final totals: 1,253–1,013 (.553) for five AL teams (556–385, .593, as a Yankee) in the regular season, with one World Series win (1977), two AL pennants and six division titles.
  - Steinbrenner taps Lou Piniella to return to the dugout and replace Martin; it's ex-GM Piniella's second term as the club's manager.
  - Martin becomes the fourth high-profile, veteran manager whose careers will end this season; the others: Gene Mauch, Chuck Tanner and Dick Williams.
- June 26 – Craig Biggio makes his MLB debut. In three plate appearances, Biggio strikes out once, draws a walk, and scores a run as his Houston Astros notch a 6–0 win over the San Francisco Giants.
- June 30 – The Illinois General Assembly votes to help fund a new baseball stadium to replace Comiskey Park, now the oldest facility in Major League Baseball. The vote keeps Chicago White Sox owner Jerry Reinsdorf from carrying out his threat to move the team.

=== July ===
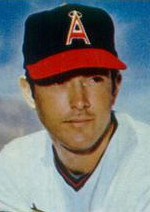
Nolan Ryan won 138 games for the California Angels

- July 4 – At the unofficial half-way mark of the 1988 season, the closest pennant race is in the American League East, where the Detroit Tigers (49–30) hold a 2½-game lead over the New York Yankees (47–33). With MLB's best record, the Oakland Athletics (52–29) maintain a six-game cushion in the AL West over the defending world champion Minnesota Twins (45–34). The New York Mets (52–30), who have the majors' second-best record so far, lead the National League East by seven lengths over the Chicago Cubs (44–36). In the NL West, the resurgent Los Angeles Dodgers (46–33) are 5½ in front of the arch-rival San Francisco Giants (41–39).
- July 5 – Dave Dombrowski becomes the youngest general manager in the major leagues when the Montreal Expos promote him to succeed Bill Stoneman. Three weeks from his 32nd birthday, Dombrowski joined the club's front office in 1986 after spending his early career with the Chicago White Sox working under Roland Hemond.
- July 9:
  - In their 21–2 victory over the St. Louis Cardinals, the San Francisco Giants establish a franchise record (since its move to the West Coast in 1958) for most runs scored in a game. Chris Speier hits for the cycle and Ernest Riles slugs the 10,000th home run in the Giants' all-time, 105-year history.
  - Nolan Ryan becomes the first pitcher to win 100 games in both the American and National leagues, as the Houston Astros defeat Ryan's original team, the New York Mets, 6–3.
  - When the Detroit Tigers top the Oakland Athletics, 4–3, manager Sparky Anderson racks up his 800th regular-season win as the Tigers' skipper, making him the first man to win 800 or more games in each league. Anderson, 54, won 863 during his nine seasons as pilot of the Cincinnati Reds (1970–1978); he's been running the Bengal dugout since June 14, 1979.
- July 12 – After being maligned as unworthy to be voted a starting catcher in the 1988 All-Star Game—his batting average is currently .219—Terry Steinbach of the Minnesota Twins hits a solo home run and a sacrifice fly to lead the American League to a 2–1 victory over the National League at Riverfront Stadium. Steinbach is named MVP.
- July 13 – The Cincinnati Reds and Montreal Expos make a five-player transaction during the All-Star break. Cincinnati trades pitcher Pat Pacillo, the team's top pick in the 1984 June draft, and outfielder Tracy Jones to Montréal for right-hander Randy St. Claire, catcher Jeff Reed and outfielder Herm Winningham.
- July 14:
  - The Boston Red Sox, a disappointing 43–42 and 8½ games out of first in the AL East, fire John McNamara, their manager since 1985, and appoint third-base coach "Walpole Joe" Morgan interim pilot. Morgan, so nicknamed to differentiate him from the Hall-of-Fame former second baseman, is a 57-year-old, ex-utility infielder who hit only .193 with 36 hits for five MLB teams, then managed in the minors for 16 seasons. The Red Sox respond to his hiring by winning their next 12 games and 19 of their next 20—earning "Walpole Joe" a permanent job and causing the press to coin the term "Morgan Magic."
  - Ten days after being released by the Kansas City Royals, relief pitcher Dan Quisenberry is signed by the St. Louis Cardinals.
  - The Chicago Cubs and Montreal Expos trade outfielders, with the Cubs shipping Dave Martinez to the Expos for Mitch Webster.
- July 21 – In what will become known as one of the most one-sided trades of its era, the Seattle Mariners obtain outfielder Jay Buhner, along with two minor-league pitchers, Rick Balabon and Troy Evers (PTBNL), from the New York Yankees for DH/first baseman Ken Phelps. Phelps will play half a season for the Yankees before injuries derail his career, and Buhner blossoms into an All-Star with Seattle, smashing 307 home runs and twice leading his league's outfielders in assists. Seven years after the trade, it will be mocked by actor Jerry Stiller in a 1995 episode of Seinfeld.
- July 22 – Seattle makes another deal, re-acquiring third baseman Darnell Coles and sending veteran outfielder Glenn Wilson to the Pittsburgh Pirates in exchange.
- July 27:
  - Just six days after he pulls off the Buhner coup, the Mariners' general manager, Dick Balderson, is fired by his impatient owner, George Argyros. The Ms are only 39–62 and last in the AL West. Argyros names Woody Woodward as Balderson's successor; it's Woodward's third major-league GM job in less than a calendar year.
  - Julio Franco goes three-for-five and drives in five runs, helping his Cleveland Indians trounce the host Baltimore Orioles, 12–2, and extending his hitting streak, which started July 3, to 22 games. While not MLB's longest hit streak of 1988 (that belongs to John Shelby of the Los Angeles Dodgers, a 24-game skein between May 14 and June 9), it's the longest in the American League and Franco's second 20+-game streak of the season; he earlier hit safely in 21 straight between May 11 and June 3.
  - The Texas Rangers sign catcher Iván Rodríguez as an international free agent.
- July 29 – The Boston Red Sox trade future World Series hero Curt Schilling, currently age 21 and pitching for Double-A New Britain, and rookie outfielder Brady Anderson to the Baltimore Orioles for veteran right-hander Mike Boddicker.

=== August ===
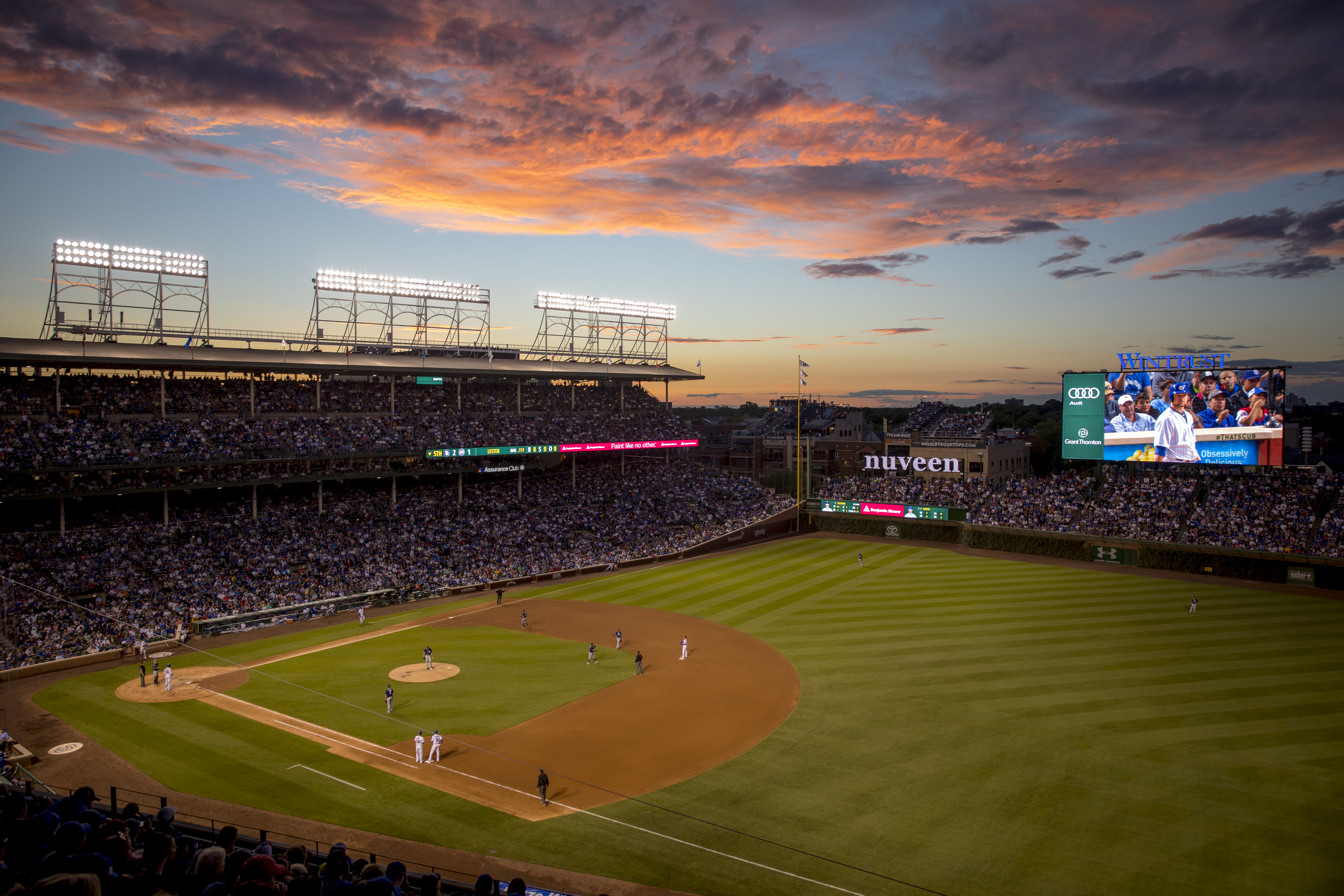
Night game at Wrigley Field (2017)

- August 2 – Outfielder Ken Griffey Sr. returns to the Cincinnati Reds as a free agent; Griffey, now 38, was a three-time National League All-Star as a member of Cincinnati's "Big Red Machine" between 1973 and 1981. He had been released by the Atlanta Braves on July 28.
- August 3 – The red-hot Boston Red Sox, 19–1 since Joe Morgan's appointment as manager, climb into a first-place tie in the AL East, defeating the Texas Rangers, 5–4, while the front-running Detroit Tigers fall to the Kansas City Royals, 2–1. Both clubs are 62–43. The Tigers, however, will cool off the Bosox by winning four in a five-game series that begins tomorrow in Detroit.
- August 9 – Fifty-three years, two months and 16 days since MLB's first night game on May 24, 1935, the Chicago Cubs win the first official contest played under the lights at Wrigley Field, 6–4, over the New York Mets. The lights had been switched on just before the start of the prior evening's game, a rain-out.
- August 10 – One day after he permits six runs, five earned, in a seven-inning start against the Cincinnati Reds, the Los Angeles Dodgers release Cooperstown-bound Don Sutton, 43, ending his playing career. With 324 victories, 233 as a Dodger, Sutton retires as MLB's winningest active pitcher; he's 3–6 (3.92) in 16 starts in 1988.
- August 11:
  - Having been stuck at 299 career home runs since May 16, New York Mets catcher Gary Carter clubs career home run #300 in a 9–6 victory over the Chicago Cubs at Wrigley Field.
  - The Boston Red Sox set an AL record with their 23rd straight win at home, beating the Detroit Tigers 9–4. Boston surpasses the league mark of 22 set by the 1931 Philadelphia Athletics.
- August 13 – Just 4½ games from first in the NL East after four straight losing seasons, the re-built Pittsburgh Pirates (64–53) obtain veteran left-hander Dave LaPoint, a ten-game winner in 25 starts for the Chicago White Sox so far in 1988, for righty Barry Jones. LaPoint will win four games for the Bucs down the stretch before departing as a free agent in November.
- August 16 – In an attention-grabbing trade of productive marquee players, the St. Louis Cardinals deal former 21-game-winning lefty John Tudor, 34, to the Los Angeles Dodgers for hard-hitting outfielder/first baseman Pedro Guerrero, 32, a four-time All-Star and .309 lifetime hitter.
- August 26 – Former All-Star closer Donnie Moore is unconditionally released by the California Angels. Moore, 33, is 5–2 (4.92) with four saves in only 27 appearances this season. Known for allowing a devastating home run in the 1986 ALCS, he will attempt a brief comeback in the minor leagues in 1989, but his MLB career is over.
- August 30 – Orel Hershiser wins his 18th game and helps himself with a two-RBI double in a complete-game, 4–2 Los Angeles Dodgers triumph over the Montreal Expos at Olympic Stadium. With two out in the fifth, he allows his second run of the inning before shutting down the Expos for the rest of the game. The 41/3 shutout innings that close today's contest kick off what will be Hershiser's MLB-record-setting string of 591/3 scoreless innings pitched, which will continue through the end of the regular season September 28.
- August 31:
  - For the second time in less than a year, MLB owners are found guilty of collusion: conspiring to restrict salaries, contract terms, and free-agent mobility in violation of their CBA with the players' union. In his finding regarding the free-agent "Class of 1986," a case known as "Collusion II," arbitrator George Nicolau writes that owners, "by common consent," ceded "exclusive negotiating rights … to former clubs. There was no vestige of a free market, as that term is commonly understood." Monetary damages will levied against the owners after additional hearings are held.
  - Veteran outfielder Fred Lynn, 36, is traded by the last-place Baltimore Orioles to the contending Detroit Tigers for catcher Chris Hoiles and two minor-league pitchers, Robinson Garcés and César Mejía.
  - The Houston Astros obtain right-hander Bob Forsch from the St. Louis Cardinals for outfielder Denny Walling. Forsch, 38, has won 163 games over his 15 seasons as a Cardinal, and is 9–4 (3.73) in 30 games (including 12 starts) this season.

=== September ===
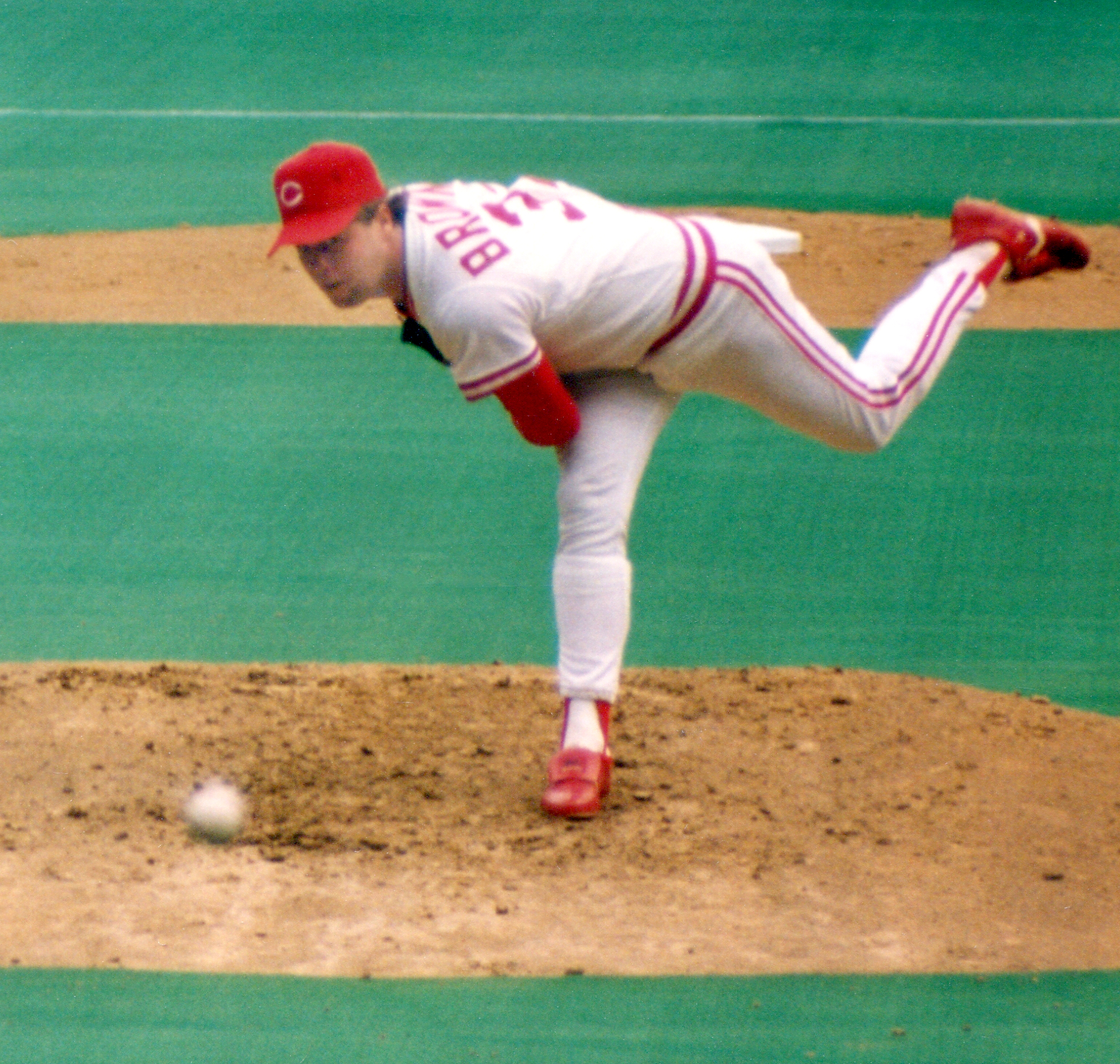
Tom Browning

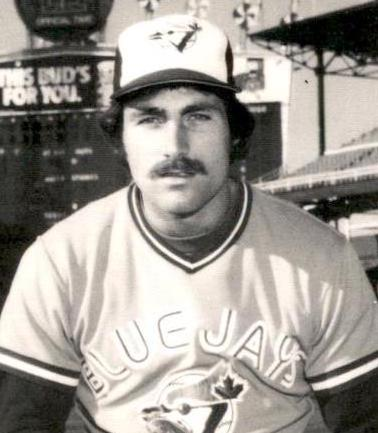
Dave Stieb

- September 5 – The regular season's post-Labor-Day, final stretch begins with two divisions still up for grabs. The AL East has the closest race, where the front-runners, the Boston Red Sox and Detroit Tigers, are coming off poor months of August. The Red Sox (76–61) lead the Tigers (75–62) by a single game, but the New York Yankees, Milwaukee Brewers and Toronto Blue Jays are within 6½ lengths. In the NL West, the Los Angeles Dodgers (78–57) have a five-game advantage over the Houston Astros (74–63).
  - The other divisions have clear-cut leaders, with the New York Mets (81–54) and Oakland Athletics (87–51) enjoying margins of ten and 9½ games respectively.
- September 8 – MLB owners unanimously elect A. Bartlett Giamatti, 50, former Yale University president and chief executive of the National League since June 1986, the seventh Commissioner of Baseball. His term will begin April 1, 1989. Until then, he will work alongside incumbent Peter Ueberroth, who declined to seek reelection.
- September 9 – Bruce Sutter converts his 300th career save (the third player in history to do so) to preserve an Atlanta Braves win over the San Diego Padres. It is the last save of his career.
- September 11 – In the American League's longest game, by innings, of the year, the Detroit Tigers and New York Yankees battle into the 18th tied, 3–3. In the top half, the Tigers push over an unearned run to take the lead, only to see the Bombers' Claudell Washington slug a two-run, game-winning, walk-off homer in the home half. The win lifts the Yankees into second place over Detroit, 3½ games behind the Boston Red Sox in the division race.
- September 14 – Mike Greenwell hits for the cycle and scores three runs, driving his Red Sox to a 4–3 victory over the Baltimore Orioles at Fenway Park and helping his team maintain its 4½-game lead in the AL East. Greenwell's sixth-inning triple comes as the result of a disputed official scorer's ruling on a wind-blown fly that's misplayed by Baltimore left-fielder Larry Sheets.
- September 16 – Tom Browning of the Cincinnati Reds hurls a 1–0 perfect game over the Los Angeles Dodgers. Browning becomes the second left-hander to pitch a perfect game, joining Sandy Koufax in 1965. The tenth perfect game in major league history, it's the first ever pitched against a team that will win the World Series that year. Browning's gem is also MLB's only nine-inning no-hitter of 1988. In defeating the San Diego Padres on June 6 of this season, Browning had another no-hitter broken up in the ninth inning by Tony Gwynn's single with one out.
- September 17 – Jeff Reardon becomes the first pitcher to save 40 games in one season in both leagues as the Minnesota Twins beat the Chicago White Sox, 3–1. Reardon, who saved 41 games for the Montreal Expos in 1985, pitches the ninth inning for his 40th save in 47 opportunities.
- September 20 – Wade Boggs of the Boston Red Sox becomes the first player in major league history since 1901 to collect 200 or more hits in six consecutive years. He is also the second player (to Lou Gehrig) to collect 200 hits and 100 bases on balls in three straight seasons.
- September 22:
  - With nine games left in the 1988 campaign, the Philadelphia Phillies, last in the NL East at 60–92–1, fire Lee Elia, their manager since June 18, 1987. Coach John Vukovich will guide them to a 5–4 record as interim pilot down the final stretch.
  - The California Angels, 75–79 and fourth in the AL West, make another managerial change, dropping Cookie Rojas, their skipper since March 26, in favor of coach Moose Stubing on an interim basis; Stubing goes 0–8 in the Halos' waning days of 1988.
- September 23 – In a 9–8, 14-inning victory over the Milwaukee Brewers at County Stadium, José Canseco of the Oakland Athletics steals his 39th and 40th bases of 1988 to become the first member of the "40–40 club". Canseco also blasts his 41st homer of the year, a three-run job, in the eighth.
- September 24 – The Athletics defeat the Brewers 5–2 for their 100th win of the season. Oakland starter Dave Stewart picks up his 20th win, and Dennis Eckersley gets his 44th save.
- September 28:
  - In a scintillating, suspenseful and historic pitchers' duel at Jack Murphy Stadium, Orel Hershiser of the Los Angeles Dodgers fires ten scoreless innings against the San Diego Padres, to set the new MLB record for consecutive scoreless innings pitched—59—while the man who held the previous mark, 582/3, in 1968, Hall-of-Famer Don Drysdale, broadcasts the event with Vin Scully to Los Angeles fans. In the tenth, Hershiser strands baserunner Marvell Wynne at third with two out to set the new record; then, his streak still intact, he leaves the contest for a double-switch in the 11th. The Padres' Andy Hawkins matches Hershiser with ten scoreless frames, and the teams battle into the 16th tied 0–0 before San Diego notches a come-from-behind, 2–1 triumph on Mark Parent's walk-off home run.
    - Hershiser will go on to throw 81/3 more scoreless innings in Game 1 of the NL Championship Series before surrendering a run on a Darryl Strawberry RBI double. His regular-season record will be extended to 591/3 in his first start of 1989, when he's finally scored upon in the opening frame.
  - At the Seoul Summer Olympiad, where baseball is a "demonstration sport," left-hander Jim Abbott fires a complete-game 5–3 victory for the U.S. over Japan in the championship match. Abbott, the California Angels' top draft pick, was born without a right hand; he is saluted by his Japanese opponents on the field after he secures the final out. Baseball will become a full-fledged Olympic medal sport with the 1992 Barcelona games.
- September 29 – The Chicago Cubs deal eight-year veteran starting catcher and Georgia native Jody Davis to the Atlanta Braves for pitchers Kevin Blankenship and Kevin Coffman.
- September 30:
  - For the second consecutive start, Dave Stieb of the Toronto Blue Jays has a no-hitter broken up with two out in the ninth, and has to settle for a one-hit shutout. In the Blue Jays' 4–0 victory over the Baltimore Orioles at Exhibition Stadium, he has the bid broken up by a Jim Traber single. Six days earlier, in a 1–0 shutout over the Cleveland Indians at Cleveland Stadium, Stieb's bid for a no-hitter was broken up by a Julio Franco single with two out in the ninth. Had Stieb accomplished the double no-hit feat, he would have joined Johnny Vander Meer (1938) as the only pitchers to hurl no-hitters in consecutive starts.
  - The final MLB divisional race is decided when the Boston Red Sox (89–71) clinch the AL East title—although they "back in" to the championship. The Bosox (89–71) lose (4–2 to the Cleveland Indians), but so do their remaining challengers, the Milwaukee Brewers (86–73) and New York Yankees (85–74). Boston will face the Oakland Athletics in the 1988 ALCS, while the Los Angeles Dodgers take on the New York Mets in the NLCS.

=== October ===
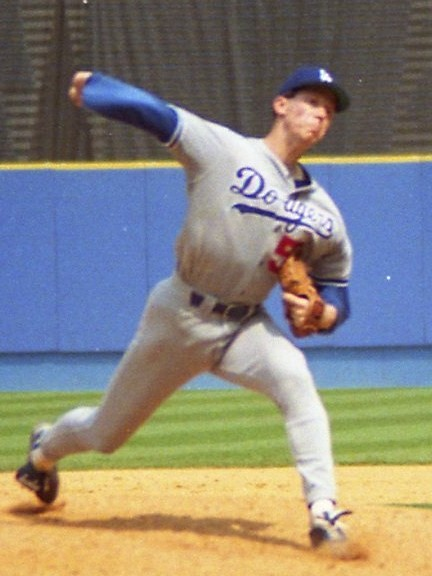
Orel Hershiser

- October 3:
  - The Philadelphia Phillies trade their once-prized, free-agent catcher, Lance Parrish, back to the American League, sending him to the California Angels for 19-year-old pitching prospect David Holdridge. Parrish, 32, batted only .230 with 32 home runs in his two years as a Phillie. He waives pending free-agency by signing a one-year, $1 million contract with the Angels.
  - The Houston Astros dismiss manager Hal Lanier after his 1988 team lost 17 of its final 25 games to disappear from the NL West race. The Astros had also slumped at the end of 1987. Lanier's replacement, named November 7, will be former Houston infielder Art Howe, 41, one of Bobby Valentine's lieutenants with the in-state rival Texas Rangers.
- October 4 – Nick Leyva, 35, a coach for Whitey Herzog's St. Louis Cardinals since 1984, takes the managerial reins of the division-rival Phillies, signing a three-year contract. Recently hired GM Lee Thomas was Leyva's boss when Thomas served as the Redbirds' farm system director.
- October 5 – General manager Syd Thrift, who rebuilt the Pittsburgh Pirates from a 57-win, last-place outfit in 1985 to an 85-win, runner-up in this past season's NL East race, is fired by unanimous vote of the club's board of directors. His assistant, Larry Doughty, is elevated to interim (and ultimately permanent) GM. Despite his accomplishments, Thrift, 59, is bounced because of his excessive "egotism" and reluctance to share credit for the Bucs' resurgence.
- October 7 – The Cincinnati Reds release shortstop Dave Concepción, 40, one of the last remaining active members of the "Big Red Machine" dynasty of the 1970s. Concepción, a nine-time All-Star and 5x Gold Glover, appeared in 2,488 regular-season games and won two World Series rings in his 19 seasons in a Cincinnati uniform. Ron Oester will become the last player from that era on the roster after Ken Griffey is released on August 24, 1990.
- October 8:
  - Controversy erupts in Game 3 of the 1988 NLCS at Shea Stadium with the series knotted at one game each. The Los Angeles Dodgers, nursing a 4–3, eighth-inning lead, call on closer Jay Howell to preserve their one-run edge. But, on a 3–2 count to lead-off man Kevin McReynolds, New York Mets manager Davey Johnson asks the umpires to inspect Howell's equipment for an illegal substance—and they discover pine tar on his glove. Howell is ejected, and the Dodger lead evaporates when New York tallies five runs on key hits from Wally Backman, Mookie Wilson and Darryl Strawberry. The Mets' 8–4 win enables them to move ahead, two-games-to-one, in the best of seven matchup. The National League suspends Howell for the duration of the series, then reduces the penalty to two days.
  - For the 16th time in the 16 years he has been the New York Yankees' principal owner, George Steinbrenner changes managers, replacing Lou Piniella with Dallas Green, 54, former president and general manager (1982–1987) of the Chicago Cubs and before that a pennant- and World Series-winning pilot of the Philadelphia Phillies (1979–1981). Piniella went only 45–48 during his second term at the Yankee helm, which began June 24 after Billy Martin was fired; he had previously skippered them for the full seasons of 1986 and 1987.
  - The Chicago White Sox sack manager Jim Fregosi, their skipper since June 21, 1986. The former All-Star shortstop, 46, compiled a 193–226 (.461) record for the South Siders.
- October 9:
  - The 1988 ALCS is settled quickly, when the Oakland Athletics dispose of the Boston Red Sox in four straight contests. In today's 4–1 triumph at the Oakland–Alameda County Coliseum, José Canseco belts his third homer of the series, Dave Stewart handcuffs Boston over seven innings, and closer Dennis Eckersley saves his fourth straight LCS victory to win MVP honors. With its sweep, the Athletics franchise earns the 13th AL pennant in its 88-year history, and first since 1974.
  - The Toronto Blue Jays sign coveted international free-agent Carlos Delgado, a 16-year-old, hard-hitting catcher from Aguadilla, Puerto Rico; he'll still be 16 when he debuts next summer in the New York–Penn League. Delgado, later an outfielder and first baseman, will smash 473 home runs in a 17-season MLB career that begins in 1993.
- October 12 – Orel Hershiser throws a five-hit shutout and leads the underdog Los Angeles Dodgers to a 6–0 victory and a seven-game NLCS triumph over the visiting New York Mets. He's named the series' MVP after starting three games and relieving in one and going 1–0 (1.09) with a save. The Dodgers, who had lost ten of 11 games to the Mets and were outscored 49–18 during the regular season, win their 21st National League pennant since 1890.
- October 15 – In Game 1 of the 1988 World Series at Dodger Stadium, Los Angeles trails the Oakland Athletics, 4–3, in the bottom of the ninth when Kirk Gibson, each of his legs injured during the pennant race and NLCS, hobbles to the plate to pinch-hit against Oakland's lethal closer, Dennis Eckersley. With two outs, a full count, and Mike Davis on second base, Gibson uses his upper body and wrists to launch a backdoor slider from Eckersley into the right-field stands for a 5–4 Dodger victory. Gibson's home run re-energizes his team and shatters the confidence of the favored Athletics, who lose the series in five games. It inspires the phrase "walk-off home run" (ironically, based on a term coined by Eckersley) and is widely regarded as one of the greatest moments in baseball history.
- October 20 – Orel Hershiser caps his dream season with a 5–2, four-hitter over the Oakland Athletics in Game 5 of the World Series to give the Dodgers their first championship since 1981 and sixth overall; it also makes them the only team with more than one Fall Classic championship during the 1980s. Hershiser is elected the series' MVP.
- October 24:
  - In an interim remedial award based on his August 31 ruling in Collusion II, arbitrator George Nicolau declares 14 members of the "Class of 1986" to be "new-look" free agents, eligible to negotiate with competing MLB teams despite already holding contracts. They include pitchers Doyle Alexander, Jim Clancy, Ken Dayley and Roy Smith; catchers Bob Boone and Rich Gedman; infielder Willie Randolph; and outfielder Claudell Washington. Tim Raines is also among them, but he had waived his new-look free-agent rights when he recently signed a three-year, $6.3 million contract to remain with the Montreal Expos.
  - Jack Clark's tenure in the Bronx ends after one season when the New York Yankees trade the first baseman/DH, along with pitcher Pat Clements, to the San Diego Padres for hurlers Jimmy Jones and Lance McCullers and outfielder Stan Jefferson.
  - The Philadelphia Phillies deal lefty and former 17-game-winner Shane Rawley and cash to the Minnesota Twins for catcher Tom Nieto, infielder Tom Herr and outfielder Eric Bullock.
- October 25 – With 15 of 28 first place votes and 103 points, Tony La Russa of the Oakland Athletics is elected AL Manager of the Year by the Baseball Writers' Association of America; Joe Morgan, who took control of the Boston Red Sox on July 14, is the runner-up (nine first-place mentions, 89 points).
- October 26 – Six days after leading the Los Angeles Dodgers to an improbable World Series championship, Tommy Lasorda is named NL Manager of the Year by the BBWAA. Lasorda wins in a runaway, taking 19 of 24 first place votes for 101 points, doubling the support for his runner-up, Jim Leyland of the Pittsburgh Pirates.
- October 28 – The Detroit Tigers deal veteran right-hander Walt Terrell to the San Diego Padres for first baseman Keith Moreland and third baseman Chris Brown. Terrell, 30, went only 7–16 (3.97) in 29 starts in 1988, after winning 17 of 27 decisions in 1987.

=== November ===
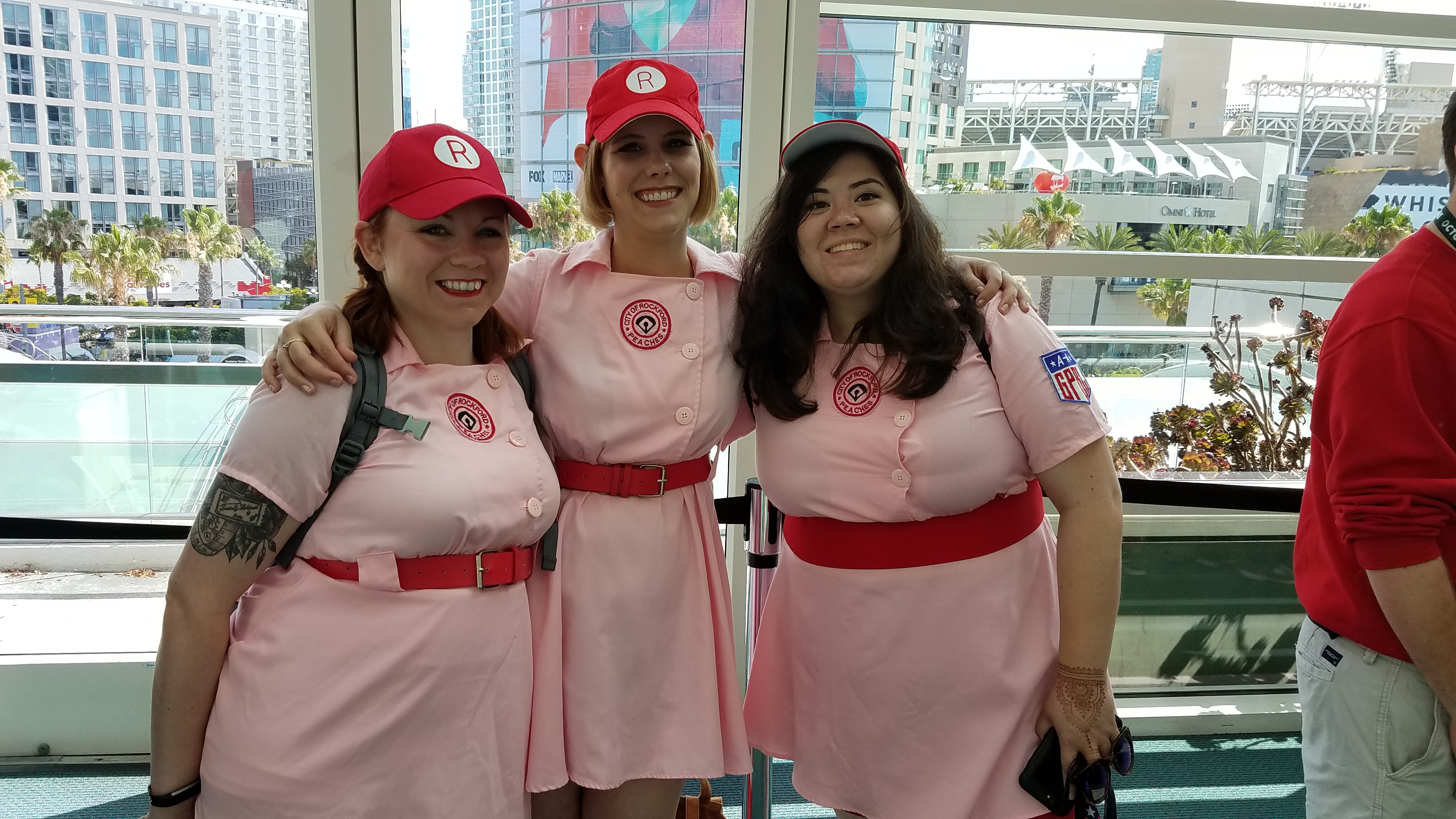
Cosplay from A League of Their Own, the 1993 AAGPBL biopic, at San Diego Comic-Con (2018)

- November 3:
  - The Minnesota Twins trade future Hall of Famer Bert Blyleven to the California Angels, along with minor-league hurler Kevin Trudeau, for pitchers Mike Cook and Rob Wassenaar and first baseman Paul Sorrento. Blyeleven, 37, has compiled 149 victories over two separate terms as a Twin; the native of The Netherlands, who grew up in Southern California, will come "home" to win 17 games for the Angels.
  - Jeff Torborg is named to fill the vacant Chicago White Sox managerial job. The former MLB catcher, 46, helmed the Cleveland Indians from June 19, 1977 to July 22, 1979, and compiled a 157–201 (.439) record. He has spent the past nine seasons on the coaching staff of the New York Yankees.
- November 4 – The free-agent "Class of 1988" is joined by 75 players granted the opportunity under the terms of the CBA to test the market for their services. Two future Hall of Famers headline the class: Nolan Ryan and Mike Schmidt.
- November 7:
  - The Seattle Mariners appoint former second baseman and 1965 NL Rookie of the Year Jim Lefebvre their pilot for 1989. Lefebvre, 46, previously was the third base and hitting coach of the Oakland Athletics.
  - The Los Angeles Dodgers come to contract terms with two key players who were granted free agency from the world-champion club three days ago: pitcher Alejandro Peña and shortstop Alfredo Griffin.
- November 8 – The National Baseball Hall of Fame and Museum announces the inauguration of Women in Baseball, a permanent display to honor the entire All-American Girls Professional Baseball League rather than any individual figure. The AAGPBL began play in 1943 and lasted a dozen years, giving more than 500 women an opportunity that had never existed before.
- November 9:
  - Winning 27 of 28 first-place votes, Minnesota Twins pitcher Frank Viola is selected the American League's Cy Young Award winner. The left-hander posted a 24–7 record with 193 strikeouts and a 2.64 ERA.
  - The Baltimore Orioles acquire first baseman/DH Randy Milligan from the Pittsburgh Pirates for minor-league hurler Pete Blohm.
- November 10:
  - Los Angeles Dodgers pitcher Orel Hershiser, who posted a 23–8 record with 178 strikeouts and a 2.31 ERA, is a unanimous choice as National League's Cy Young Award winner, receiving all 24 first place votes from the BBWAA. He is the ninth pitcher to win the NL award unanimously.
  - Tommy John is released by the New York Yankees; however, the 45-year-old southpaw will return to the Bombers for a 26th big-league season when he signs a free-agent contract on February 13, 1989.
- November 14 – The California Angels fill their 1989 managerial vacancy by hiring former 5x NL Gold Glove-winning third baseman and one-time Texas Rangers skipper Doug Rader, 44. Owner Gene Autry admits he initially offered the post to Gene Mauch, who has already served two terms in the job and resigned twice, in 1982 and again this past March, when he stepped down in the middle of spring training for health reasons.
- November 15 – Kirk Gibson, the fiery outfielder who drove the Los Angeles Dodgers to a pennant and world championship, is elected Most Valuable Player in his first season in the National League. With 13 of 24 first-place votes and 272 points, he outdistances two members of the New York Mets, Darryl Strawberry (seven, 236) and Kevin McReynolds (four, 162).
- November 16 – José Canseco is the unanimous choice as the American League Most Valuable Player, winning all 28 first-place votes cast. Canseco led the AL in homers (42), RBI (124) and slugging (.569), and also stole 40 bases in 1988. He becomes the Junior Circuit's first consensus MVP since another Oakland outfielder, Reggie Jackson, in 1973.
- November 23 – The New York Yankees sign Steve Sax, granted free agency from the Los Angeles Dodgers on November 4, to a three-year, $4 million contract. Three-time NL All-Star Sax, 28, has been the Dodgers' everyday second baseman since 1982.
- November 28 – Rich Gedman becomes the highest paid catcher in American League history when he signs a one-year contract with the Boston Red Sox for $1.2 million.
- November 30:
  - The Kansas City Royals sign catcher Bob Boone, a "new look" free agent liberated from the California Angels by arbitrator George Nicolau in an October 24 ruling. Boone, 41, will win his fourth straight AL Gold Glove Award in 1989.
  - The Oakland Athletics sign journeyman outfielder Billy Beane, granted his six-year free agency from the Detroit Tigers on October 15. Beane, 26, will play one more pro season, mostly in the minor leagues, in 1989 before embarking on a momentous off-field career as, first, a scout, and then a prominent front-office executive of the Athletics franchise.

=== December ===
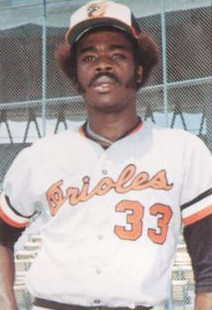
Eddie Murray

- December 1 – The Oakland Athletics retain hard-hitting outfielder Dave Henderson, signing him to a three-year, $2.8 million contract. Henderson, 30, had been granted free agency on November 4.
- December 3:
  - The Cleveland Indians sign left-handed relief pitcher Jesse Orosco, granted free agency from the Los Angeles Dodgers November 4. Orosco, 31 and reaching the midpoint of a 24-year MLB career (when he'll set an all-time record for 1,252 games pitched), appeared in 55 contests out of the Dodger bullpen last year.
  - The New York Yankees sign another veteran southpaw and November 4 free agent, Dave LaPoint, 29, a 14-game winner in 1988.
- December 4:
  - The Baltimore Orioles trade future Hall-of-Fame first baseman Eddie Murray to the Los Angeles Dodgers for pitchers Brian Holton and Ken Howell and infielder Juan Bell. Native Angeleno Murray—who wears #33—has slugged 333 homers in his 12-season career in Baltimore.
  - The Houston Astros obtain right-hander Mark Portugal from the Minnesota Twins for a player to be named later, pitcher Todd McClure. Portugal, 26, will blossom into an effective starting pitcher in Houston, and an 18-game winner in 1993.
- December 5:
  - The estate of late owner Edward Bennett Williams, who died in August, sells the Orioles for $70 million to a group headed by financier Eli Jacobs and including incumbent team president Larry Lucchino, a Williams protégé. Jacobs and Lucchino will spearhead the design and construction of Oriole Park at Camden Yards, which, after its opening in 1992, will serve as a model for a new era of "jewel box" style MLB ballparks built expressly for baseball.
  - The Chicago Cubs and Texas Rangers open the annual winner meetings with a nine-player, inter-league trade. The Cubs send pitchers Drew Hall and Jamie Moyer and outfielder Rafael Palmeiro to the Rangers for pitchers Paul Kilgus, Mitch Williams and Steve Wilson, infielders Curtis Wilkerson and Luis Benítez, and outfielder Pablo Delgado. The headliners are future slugger Palmeiro, already an All-Star, and the flamboyant relief pitcher Williams, but Moyer (now 26 and a three-year veteran) is also destined for a memorable, 25-year MLB career.
  - The Cleveland Indians retain southpaw starting pitcher Bud Black, 31, who had been granted free agency from them on November 4.
- December 6:
  - Continuing their off-season roster shake-ups, the Indians and Rangers team up for a major trade themselves, with Cleveland sending hard-hitting second baseman Julio Franco to Texas for first baseman Pete O'Brien, second baseman Jerry Browne and outfielder Oddibe McDowell.
  - The Montreal Expos acquire right-hander Kevin Gross, a 1988 All-Star, from the division-rival Philadelphia Phillies for pitchers Jeff Parrett and Floyd Youmans.
- December 7:
  - The Rangers drop yet another off-season bombshell, luring future Hall of Famer and Texas baseball icon Nolan Ryan north to the Dallas–Fort Worth metroplex and away from the Houston Astros with a one-year $1.6 million contract. Granted free agency on November 4, Ryan (who will turn 42 in January), is already the author of a record five no-hitters; he'll fire two more during his five-year career with the Rangers, while "changing the destiny" of what had been thought of as a "small-time franchise."
  - Another future inductee to the Baseball Hall of Fame and November 4 free agent, Mike Schmidt, decides to remain with the Philadelphia Phillies on a one-year deal. Battling chronic shoulder woes, the 39-year-old slugger, 12-time All-Star, and 10x Gold Glove Award winner—the greatest player in Phillies' history (106.9 bWAR)—will be able to play in only 42 games in his final season, the last on May 28, 1989.
  - The Chicago Cubs retain veteran starting pitcher Scott Sanderson, a November 4 free agent. He underwent back surgery in February 1988 and was not able to return to the mound until August 26.
  - The New York Mets deal scrappy second baseman Wally Backman to the Minnesota Twins for minor-league pitchers Jeff Bumgarner, Steve Gasser and Toby Nivens.
- December 8:
  - The San Diego Padres sign left-handed starter Bruce Hurst, granted free agency from the Boston Red Sox on November 4. Hurst, 30, had formed a one-two tandem with Roger Clemens at the top of the Bosox' rotation, and had gone 18–6 (3.66) in 32 starts in 1988.
  - The New York Yankees subtract righty Andy Hawkins from San Diego's starting pitching staff, signing the 28-year-old and member of the "Class of 1988" as a free agent. He had been 14–11 (3.33) in 33 starts for the 1988 Padres.
  - The Red Sox acquire righty John Dopson and shortstop Luis Rivera from the Montreal Expos for hurler Dan Gakeler and shortstop Spike Owen. Dopson will win 12 games and make 28 starts for Boston in 1989.
  - The Expos swap outfielders with the San Francisco Giants, sending right-handed-hitting Tracy Jones to the Giants for Mike Aldrete, a left-handed batsman.
  - The Baltimore Orioles obtain veteran outfielder Phil Bradley from the Philadelphia Phillies for pitchers Gordon Dillard and recently acquired Ken Howell.
  - The Cincinnati Reds trade Lloyd McClendon to the Chicago Cubs for fellow outfielder Rolando Roomes.
- December 10 – Willie Randolph, a "new look" free agent and a 13-year fixture in the New York Yankees' infield as a five-time All-Star second baseman for four AL pennant-winners and two World Series champions, signs a two-year, $1.75 million contract with the Los Angeles Dodgers, effectively swapping jobs with Steve Sax, who signed with the Yankees on November 23, nineteen days after being granted free agency.
- December 13:
  - One month after winning the National League's Cy Young Award, Orel Hershiser of the Los Angeles Dodgers is named the Sports Illustrated Sportsman of the Year.
  - The Boston Red Sox trade pitchers Jeff Sellers and Luis Vasquez (PTBNL) and outfielder Todd Benzinger to the Cincinnati Reds for southpaw reliever Rob Murphy and first baseman Nick Esasky.
- December 14 – CBS pays approximately $1.8 billion for exclusive over-the-air television rights to Major League Baseball for four years, beginning in 1990. CBS will pay MLB and its clubs about $265 million each year for the World Series, League Championship Series, All-Star Game, and the Saturday Game of the Week. CBS replaces ABC (which has broadcast Monday and later Thursday night games and LCS and World Series in alternating years since 1976) and NBC (which has broadcast major-league games, including World Series and All-Star games, in some shape or form since 1947 and the Game of the Week exclusively since 1966) as MLB's national network television home. It is one of the largest agreements (to date) between the sport of baseball and the business of broadcasting. The cost of the deal between CBS and Major League Baseball is about 25% more than in the previous television contract with ABC and NBC. The deal with CBS is also intended to pay each team (26 in 1990 and then, 28 by 1993) $10 million a year.
- December 16 – The St. Louis Cardinals make two transactions.
  - They sign right-hander Bob Tewksbury, 28, granted free agency from the Chicago Cubs on October 15; he'll have a banner 1992 season for the Redbirds, going 16–5 (2.16), making the All-Star team and placing third in NL Cy Young Award voting.
  - St. Louis also obtains centerfielder Milt Thompson from the Philadelphia Phillies for catcher Steve Lake and outfielder Curt Ford.
- December 20 – Ron Guidry and the New York Yankees part company when the Bombers decline to offer him a 1989 contract, making him a free agent. He's among several well-known veterans, such as Buddy Bell and Ken Griffey Sr., who are cut loose during the next two days. Although the Yankees will offer Guidry a spring training trial next season, a sore elbow will set him back; his MLB pitching career is over at age 38 after 179 regular-season victories (with three seasons of 21 or more wins), the 1978 AL Cy Young Award, two World Series rings, and a 3–1 (1.69) mark in four Fall Classic starts.
- December 22 – The Toronto Blue Jays sell the contract of first baseman/DH Cecil Fielder, 25, to the Hanshin Tigers of Nippon Professional Baseball. Fielder has struggled to find playing time in Toronto, appearing in 220 games over all or part of four seasons, but he'll belt 38 homers for Hanshin in 1989 and position himself for a return to the American League and stardom in 1990.

== Movies ==
- Bull Durham
- Eight Men Out

== Births ==
=== January ===
- January 1 – Dallas Keuchel
- January 2 – Aaron Barrett
- January 2 – Eric Fornataro
- January 6 – Cody Hall
- January 7 – Jhoulys Chacín
- January 8 – Jon Edwards
- January 10 – Rafael Dolis
- January 10 – Jason Gurka
- January 12 – Hyun-soo Kim
- January 12 – Justin Marks
- January 18 – Luis Jiménez
- January 19 – Shawn Tolleson
- January 21 – Preston Claiborne
- January 21 – Josh Ravin
- January 22 – Josh Spence
- January 24 – Ashur Tolliver
- January 26 – Josh Prince
- January 28 – A. J. Griffin
- January 29 – Mike Bolsinger
- January 29 – Hank Conger

=== February ===
- February 1 – Brett Anderson
- February 1 – Allan de San Miguel
- February 2 – Brad Peacock
- February 2 – Travis Snider
- February 10 – Jake Brigham
- February 10 – Jeanmar Gómez
- February 11 – Shane Peterson
- February 12 – Josh Phegley
- February 13 – Ryan Goins
- February 14 – Paul Clemens
- February 16 – Jorge Rondón
- February 19 – Kevin Chapman
- February 20 – Spencer Patton
- February 21 – Tyler Lyons
- February 22 – Rocky Gale
- February 24 – Chris Parmelee
- February 25 – Nathan Adcock
- February 25 – Conor Mullee
- February 26 – Dustin Ackley
- February 26 – Héctor Rondón
- February 28 – Aroldis Chapman

=== March ===
- March 1 – Trevor Cahill
- March 1 – Yang Hyeon-jong
- March 4 – José de Paula
- March 4 – Ryan Strausborger
- March 5 – Joe Benson
- March 5 – Héctor Gómez
- March 6 – Leonys Martín
- March 7 – Tyler Ladendorf
- March 8 – Tommy Pham
- March 8 – Ken Roberts
- March 10 – Cedric Hunter
- March 11 – Pedro Báez
- March 11 – Vince Belnome
- March 13 – Jason Rogers
- March 14 – Josh Stinson
- March 15 – Steve Ames
- March 19 – Clayton Kershaw
- March 23 – Dellin Betances
- March 26 – Marcus Hatley
- March 28 – Ryan Kalish

=== April ===
- April 1 – Alex Hassan
- April 3 – Hirokazu Sawamura
- April 6 – Mitsuo Yoshikawa
- April 7 – Charles Brewer
- April 9 – Simón Castro
- April 9 – Tommy Medica
- April 10 – Chris Dwyer
- April 10 – Chris Heston
- April 11 – Pete Kozma
- April 11 – Kenta Maeda
- April 11 – Chris McGuiness
- April 11 – Ryan Schimpf
- April 13 – Tsubasa Aizawa
- April 15 – Chris Tillman
- April 16 – Shogo Akiyama
- April 20 – Brandon Belt
- April 22 – Dee Strange-Gordon
- April 27 – José Miguel Fernández
- April 30 – Ryan O'Rourke
- April 30 – Jesús Sucre

=== May ===
- May 2 – Neftalí Feliz
- May 3 – Ben Revere
- May 4 – Christian Bergman
- May 7 – Sam Dyson
- May 7 – Osvaldo Martínez
- May 9 – Buddy Boshers
- May 10 – Ryan Jackson
- May 20 – Kyle Jensen
- May 20 – Carlos Rivero
- May 20 – Tony Sanchez
- May 23 – Vic Black
- May 27 – Brad Boxberger
- May 27 – Garrett Richards
- May 28 – Justin Bour
- May 28 – Ryan Court
- May 28 – Craig Kimbrel
- May 28 – Lester Oliveros

=== June ===
- June 1 – Francisco Peguero
- June 5 – Jake Petricka
- June 8 – Terrance Gore
- June 9 – Joe Kelly
- June 9 – Zach Rosscup
- June 11 – Brock Holt
- June 19 – Jacob deGrom
- June 19 – Devin Mesoraco
- June 28 – Kevan Smith
- June 29 – Brooks Raley
- June 30 – Jeff Kobernus
- June 30 – Blake Treinen

=== July ===
- July 2 – Chris Marrero
- July 5 – Andre Rienzo
- July 10 – Ryan Wheeler
- July 13 – DJ LeMahieu
- July 18 – Brett Nicholas
- July 20 – Ty Kelly
- July 20 – Stephen Strasburg
- July 22 – Kwang-hyun Kim
- July 25 – José Martínez
- July 27 – Yoervis Medina

=== August ===
- August 1 – Roenis Elías
- August 2 – Brett Jackson
- August 3 – Pat McCoy
- August 10 – Sammy Solis
- August 11 – Andrew Lambo
- August 12 – Jake Dunning
- August 12 – Jhan Mariñez
- August 12 – José Tábata
- August 13 – Brandon Workman
- August 14 – Alex Liddi
- August 16 – Justin Grimm
- August 16 – J. C. Ramírez
- August 19 – Chris Smith
- August 23 – Miles Mikolas
- August 26 – Elvis Andrus
- August 26 – Mario Hollands
- August 27 – A. J. Achter
- August 27 – Seth Frankoff
- August 27 – Mike Olt
- August 29 – Alex White
- August 31 – Matt Adams
- August 31 – Caleb Gindl

=== September ===
- September 3 – Josh Osich
- September 4 – Adam Duvall
- September 6 – Arnold León
- September 8 – Chance Ruffin
- September 8 – Alex Sanabia
- September 9 – Will Middlebrooks
- September 9 – Joey Terdoslavich
- September 11 – Mike Moustakas
- September 13 – Marcus Walden
- September 13 – Andy Wilkins
- September 17 – Casey Crosby
- September 20 – Steve Lombardozzi Jr.
- September 21 – Che-Hsuan Lin
- September 23 – Jedd Gyorko
- September 24 – James Jones
- September 24 – Moisés Sierra
- September 24 – Hunter Strickland
- September 26 – Chris Archer
- September 26 – Yūdai Ōno
- September 28 – Gary Brown
- September 28 – Cameron Rupp
- September 29 – Tyler Thornburg
- September 30 – Sugar Ray Marimón
- September 30 – Brian Moran

=== October ===
- October 3 – Mike Belfiore
- October 3 – Phil Gosselin
- October 4 – Lonnie Chisenhall
- October 7 – Brandon Cunniff
- October 8 – Manny Barreda
- October 9 – Starling Marte
- October 9 – Yuki Yanagita
- October 10 – Fernando Martínez
- October 11 – David Goforth
- October 11 – Edison Barrios
- October 12 – José Ortega
- October 12 – Nick Tepesch
- October 14 – Merrill Kelly
- October 14 – Seth Maness
- October 17 – Stefen Romero
- October 20 – Michael Mariot
- October 20 – Gus Schlosser
- October 25 – Alberto Cabrera
- October 27 – T. J. Rivera
- October 28 – Corban Joseph
- October 29 – Johnny Hellweg

=== November ===
- November 1 – Masahiro Tanaka
- November 1 – Alex Wimmers
- November 2 – Seth Rosin
- November 3 – Carlos Moncrief
- November 6 – James Paxton
- November 7 – Dariel Álvarez
- November 8 – Yasmani Grandal
- November 9 – Curt Casali
- November 9 – Zach Neal
- November 10 – Rob Segedin
- November 15 – Ben Rowen
- November 16 – Brandon Cumpton
- November 17 – Shane Greene
- November 20 – Cody Allen
- November 21 – Ryan LaMarre
- November 21 – Matt West
- November 22 – Drew Pomeranz
- November 22 – Austin Romine
- November 24 – Jarrod Parker
- November 25 – Jimmy Paredes
- November 26 – Josh Smoker
- November 26 – Matt Tracy
- November 26 – Héctor Velázquez
- November 28 – Kevin Quackenbush
- November 29 – Brett Nicholas

=== December ===
- December 1 – Daniel Straily
- December 2 – Brett Eibner
- December 6 – Adam Eaton
- December 12 – Juan Díaz
- December 12 – Mike Kickham
- December 13 – Perci Garner
- December 14 – Matt Grace
- December 14 - Hayato Sakamoto
- December 15 – Ryan Pressly
- December 20 – Erik Goeddel
- December 20 – Braulio Lara
- December 21 – Danny Duffy
- December 21 – Cody Stanley
- December 21 – Asher Wojciechowski
- December 23 – Audry Pérez
- December 23 – Roberto Pérez
- December 27 – Rick Porcello
- December 27 – Addison Reed
- December 30 – Bryce Brentz
- December 30 – Danny Burawa
- December 30 – Drew Rucinski
- December 31 – Álex Colomé

== Deaths ==
=== January ===
- January 6 – Ralph Buxton, 76, Canadian pitcher who played briefly for the 1938 Philadelphia Athletics and the 1949 New York Yankees.
- January 12 – John H. Johnson, 66, president of Minor League Baseball from 1979 until his death; previously, farm system director of the Yankees from 1958 to 1971, and assistant to Commissioner of Baseball Bowie Kuhn from 1971 to 1979.
- January 15 – George Hennessey, 80, pitcher for the St. Louis Browns, Philadelphia Phillies and Chicago Cubs between 1937 and 1945.
- January 16 – Dutch Kemner, 88, relief pitcher who appeared in nine games with the 1929 Cincinnati Reds.
- January 23 – Johnny Gee, 72, who pitched for the Pittsburgh Pirates and the New York Giants in the 1940s and also played basketball with the NBA Syracuse Nationals during the 1946–1947 season.
- January 24 – Ray Rohwer, 92, outfielder who hit .284 for the Pittsburgh Pirates from 1921 to 1922.
- January 28 – Al Rubeling, 74, backup infielder for the Philadelphia Athletics and Pittsburgh Pirates from 1940 through 1944.

=== February ===
- February 1 – Red Phillips, 79, relief pitcher who posted a 4–4 record in 29 games for the Detroit Tigers in the 1934 and 1936 seasons.
- February 3 – Jocko Thompson, 71, left-hander who pitched in 41 games for the Philadelphia Phillies for all or parts of four seasons (1948–1951); a much-decorated United States Army lieutenant who served in the European Theater during World War II.
- February 16 – Bill Cox, 74, pitcher in 50 games for the St. Louis Cardinals, Chicago White Sox and St. Louis Browns from 1936 to 1940, who later served in Germany in the U.S. Army during World War II.
- February 20:
  - Bob O'Farrell, 91, catcher for four National League teams over 21 seasons who won the 1926 MVP award with the St. Louis Cardinals; player-manager of Cardinals (1927) and Cincinnati Reds (Opening Day through July 6, 1934).
  - Jim Woods, 71, nicknamed "Possum", well-traveled but highly regarded #2 play-by-play broadcaster between 1953 and 1981 who called games for the New York Yankees, New York Giants, Pittsburgh Pirates, St. Louis Cardinals, Oakland Athletics, Boston Red Sox and USA Network; noted for his chemistry and collaboration with Pittsburgh's Bob Prince (1958–1969) and Boston's Ned Martin (1974–1978).
- February 23 – Pete Donohue, 87, pitcher who had three 20-win seasons for the Cincinnati Reds and beat the Philadelphia Phillies 20 consecutive times from 1922 to 1925.
- February 26 – Tom Oliver, 85, fine defensive center fielder for the Boston Red Sox in the early 1930s; later a coach for the Philadelphia Athletics and Baltimore Orioles between 1951 and 1954.
- February 28 – Harvey Kuenn, 57, eight-time All-Star shortstop and outfielder, most notably with the Detroit Tigers, who batted .303 lifetime and led the American League in hits four times and doubles three times, while winning the 1953 Rookie of the Year Award and the 1959 batting title; later, a longtime batting coach who managed the Milwaukee Brewers—nicknamed "Harvey's Wallbangers"—to their only AL pennant in 1982; compiled a 159–118 mark (.572) as skipper of the Brewers between June 2, 1982 and end of the 1983 season.

=== March ===
- March 1 – Luis "Canena" Márquez, 62, the third Puerto Rican to play in the major leagues (after Hiram Bithorn and Luis Rodríguez Olmo), who appeared in 68 games from 1951 to 1954 with the Boston Braves, Chicago Cubs and Pittsburgh Pirates.
- March 6:
  - Lou Legett, 86, catcher for the Boston Red Sox between 1929 and 1935.
  - Dick Ricketts, 54, pitcher for the 1959 St. Louis Cardinals and also a forward-center in NBA with the St. Louis Hawks and the Rochester/Cincinnati Royals from 1955 to 1958; his brother Dave was a longtime backup catcher and coach in MLB.
- March 11 – Art Daney, Chief Whitehorn, 84, Native American of the Choctaw Nation of Oklahoma, who pitched briefly for the 1928 Philadelphia Athletics.
- March 14 – Zeb Terry, 96, shortstop/second baseman who hit .260 in 589 games for the Boston Braves, Chicago Cubs, Chicago White Sox and Pittsburgh Pirates from 1916 to 1922.
- March 16 – Jigger Statz, 90, outfielder for the New York Giants, Boston Red Sox, Chicago Cubs and Brooklyn Robins from 1919 to 1928, who hit .319 for the 1923 Cubs including 209 hits, 110 runs, 51 extrabases, 70 RBI and 29 stolen bases; played 18 seasons for Los Angeles Angels of the Pacific Coast League; amassed 4,093 hits over a 24-year career.
- March 21 – Edd Roush, 94, Hall of Fame center fielder for the Cincinnati Reds who batted .323 lifetime, leading the National League in batting twice and in slugging, doubles and triples once each, while hitting 30 inside-the-park home runs and ending with 182 triples for the 13th-most triples in major league history.
- March 29 – Ted Kluszewski, 63, All-Star first baseman who played from 1947 through 1961 for four teams, most prominently the Cincinnati Reds/Redlegs; led the National League with 49 home runs and 141 RBI in 1954 and batted .300 seven times; batting star for Chicago White Sox in 1959 World Series and author of first homer in Los Angeles Angels' MLB history (1961); known for sporting a sleeveless uniform jersey that showcased his muscular biceps; served as Cincinnati's hitting coach during "The Big Red Machine" dynasty of the 1970s.

=== April ===
- April 4:
  - Jack Aragón, 72, a 12-season catcher and manager in the minor leagues who appeared in one game for the 1941 New York Giants; son of Angel Aragón.
  - Charlie Snell, 94, backup catcher who hit .211 in eight games for the 1912 St. Louis Browns.
- April 5 – Tom Earley, 71, relief pitcher who posted an 18–24 record with a 3.78 ERA for the Boston Braves from 1938 to 1945.
- April 9 – Syd Cohen, 81, pitcher for the Washington Senators from 1934 to 1937, and later a minor league baseball manager; elder brother Andy was an MLB player and coach who died six months and 20 days after Syd.
- April 12 – Frank Skaff, 77, first baseman for the 1935 Brooklyn Dodgers and the 1943 Philadelphia Athletics; longtime scout, minor league skipper and MLB coach who served as acting manager of the 1966 Detroit Tigers.
- April 14 – Ralph Winegarner, 78, infielder/outfielder/pitcher for the Cleveland Indians and St. Louis Browns in parts of six seasons spanning 1930–1949; coached for the Browns, 1949–1951.
- April 15 – John Hines, 87, outfielder/catcher for the Chicago American Giants of the Negro National League between 1923 and 1934; member of its 1926 Negro World Series champions.
- April 22 – Len Church, 46, relief pitcher for the 1966 Chicago Cubs.
- April 27 – Alphonse "Tommy" Thomas, 88, pitcher who won 117 games for the Chicago White Sox, Washington Senators, Philadelphia Phillies, St. Louis Browns and Boston Red Sox from 1926 through 1937; managed minor-league Baltimore Orioles, 1940 to 1949, then served as a Red Sox scout.
- April 29 – Dom Dallessandro, 74, outfielder for the Boston Red Sox and Chicago Cubs in eight seasons from 1937 to 1947; posted a .304 average and a .400 on-base percentage in 1944; missed 1945 Cubs' pennant-winning season and a chance to play in the World Series due to World War II military service.

=== May ===
- May 2 – Art Hefner, 74, centerfielder and third baseman for the 1948 New York Black Yankees and 1949 Philadelphia Stars of the Negro National League.
- May 12:
  - Jacquelyn Kelley, 61, All-Star outfielder in the All-American Girls Professional Baseball League.
  - Hank Schenz, 69, scrappy backup infielder who posted a .247 average in 207 games for the Chicago Cubs, Pittsburgh Pirates and New York Giants from 1946 through 1951.
- May 25 – Charlie Perkins, 82, pitcher for the Philadelphia Phillies and Brooklyn Dodgers in the early 1930s.
- May 26 – Dick Strahs, 64, relief pitcher for the 1954 Chicago White Sox.

=== June ===
- June 1 – Belve Bean, 83, relief pitcher who posted an 11–7 record with the Indians and Senators from 1930 to 1935.
- June 8 – Walt Chipple, 69, backup outfielder for the 1945 Washington Senators.
- June 9 – Newt Allen, 87, five-time All-Star second baseman for the Negro leagues' Kansas City Monarchs; two-time (1924, 1942) Negro World Series champion, the latter year as the Monarchs' player-manager.
- June 12 – Merle Settlemire, 85, relief pitcher for the 1928 Boston Red Sox.
- June 15 – Hugh Willingham, 82, backup infielder for the Chicago White Sox and Philadelphia Phillies from 1930 to 1933; later became a longtime White Sox scout.
- June 17 – Ed Montague, 82, shortstop for the Cleveland Indians between 1928 and 1932, who later became a scout, most notable for signing Willie Mays; father of the longtime umpire.
- June 19 – Alice DeCambra, 66, infielder/pitcher during five seasons in the All-American Girls Professional Baseball League.
- June 21 – Ed Linke, 76, relief pitcher who posted a 22–22 record with the Washington Senators and St. Louis Browns from 1933 to 1938.
- June 22 – Hank Edwards, 69, outfielder who hit .280 with a .343 on-base percentage in 735 games with the Indians, Cubs, Dodgers, Reds, White Sox and Browns from 1941 to 1953.
- June 27 – Red Bullock, 76, pitcher for the 1936 Philadelphia Athletics.

=== July ===
- July 1 – Ed Sauer, 69, outfielder who played in the 1940s with the Chicago Cubs, St. Louis Cardinals and Boston Braves; brother of Hank Sauer.
- July 2 – Tom Drake, 75, relief pitcher for the Cleveland Indians and Brooklyn Dodgers from 1939 to 1941.
- July 4 – Lee Weyer, 51, National League umpire from 1963 until his death; worked in 3,827 NL games, four World Series and five NL Championship Series.
- July 8 – Frank Ellerbe, 84, third baseman who hit .268 in 420 games for the Senators, Browns and Indians from 1919 to 1924.
- July 10 – Ernie Nevel, 69, relief pitcher who appeared in 14 games with the New York Yankees and Cincinnati Reds from 1950 to 1953.
- July 14 – Whitey Witt, 92, outfielder who hit .287 with 18 home runs and 302 RBI in 1,139 games for the Philadelphia Athletics, New York Yankees and Brooklyn Robins from 1916 to 1926; last surviving member of the 1923 New York Yankees' World Series champions.
- July 15 – Clyde Beck, 88, infielder for the Chicago Cubs and Cincinnati Reds from 1926 to 1931.
- July 20 – John W. Galbreath, 90, real estate magnate and majority owner of the Pittsburgh Pirates from 1950 to 1985, during which period the team won three World Series.
- July 23 – Ken Polivka, 67, relief pitcher who appeared in two games with the 1947 Cincinnati Reds.
- July 24:
  - Jerry Lane, 62, pitcher for the Washington Senators and Cincinnati Redlegs from 1953 to 1955.
  - Joe Orengo, 73, valuable man at all four infield positions, who hit .238 in 366 games for the Cardinals, Giants, Dodgers, Tigers and White Sox between 1939 and 1945.
- July 26 – Al Flair, 62, first baseman for the 1941 Boston Red Sox.
- July 27 – Jack Drees, 71, Chicago sportscaster and television voice of the White Sox from 1968 to 1972; also known for football, boxing and horse racing broadcast work.

=== August ===
- August 2 – Bob Berman, 89, backup catcher for the 1918 Washington Senators.
- August 5 – Ralph Michaels, 86, backup infielder who hit .295 in 32 games for the Chicago Cubs from 1924 to 1926.
- August 13:
  - Mel Almada, 75, outfielder who hit .284 from 1933 through 1939 for the Boston Red Sox, Washington Senators, St. Louis Browns and Brooklyn Dodgers, who is regarded as the first Mexican player to appear in a major league baseball game.
  - Edward Bennett Williams, 68, owner of the Baltimore Orioles from August 2, 1979, until his death; prominent Washington attorney and sportsman, who previously was co-owner or owner of the NFL Redskins from 1962 to 1974.
- August 22 – Bob Daughters, 74, played for the 1937 Boston Red Sox.
- August 29 – Charles Johnston, 92, American League umpire in 1936 and 1937.
- August 31 – John Daley, 101, shortstop for the 1912 St. Louis Browns, the oldest living major league player at the time of his death.

=== September ===
- September 2:
  - Jim Bagby Jr., 71, All-Star pitcher for the Boston Red Sox and Cleveland Indians (1938–1947), who led AL in starts and innings in 1943; his father, Jim Sr., won 127 games for three MLB clubs over nine seasons.
  - Marshall Riddle, 70, Negro league infielder.
- September 6 – Lew Krausse, 76, relief pitcher who posted a 5–1 record with a 4.50 ERA in 23 appearances for the Philadelphia Athletics from 1931 to 1932; longtime scout and minor-league manager; father of the MLB pitcher of the 1960s and 1970s.
- September 8 – Rats Henderson, 92, stalwart pitcher for the Atlantic City Bacharach Giants of the Eastern Colored League from 1923 to 1928; led ECL in both games won and lost (ten) in 1923.
- September 16 – Bob Trice, 62, pitcher who on September 13, 1953 became the first African American player in Philadelphia Athletics history; posted a 9–9 (5.75 ERA) record in 27 games for the A's through May 2, 1955.
- September 29 – Tony Ordeñana, 69, shortstop for the 1943 Pittsburgh Pirates, and one of many players who only appeared in the majors during World War II.

=== October ===
- October 6 – Bob Boken, 80, infielder for the Washington Senators and Chicago White Sox from 1933 to 1934.
- October 8 – Boob Fowler, 87, infielder who hit .326 in 78 games for the Cincinnati Reds and Boston Red Sox from 1923 through 1926.
- October 14:
  - Abie Hood, 85, second baseman who hit .286 in five games for the 1925 Boston Braves.
  - Vic Raschi, 69, All-Star pitcher who won 20 games for the Yankees in three straight years (1949–1951), including World Series clinchers in 1949 and 1951; all told, played for six World Series champions (1947 and 1949–1953).
- October 19 – Bill Burgo, 67, backup outfielder for the Philadelphia Athletics in the 1943 and 1944 seasons.
- October 21 – Regino "Reggie" Otero, 73, Cuban first baseman who had a long minor league career (1936–1953); played briefly with the 1945 Chicago Cubs and 13 years in the Cuban League; later a successful career manager in the Cuban, Mexican and Venezuelan leagues; coached in the majors for the Cincinnati Reds (1959–1965) and Cleveland Indians (1966), then scouted for the Indians and Dodgers.
- October 26 – Bill Johnson, 92, catcher in Black baseball who played primarily in the Eastern Colored League during the 1920s.
- October 27 – Ben Steiner, 67, second baseman for the Boston Red Sox and Detroit Tigers from 1945 to 1947.
- October 28 – Dave Tyriver, 50, pitcher for the 1962 Cleveland Indians.
- October 29 – Andy Cohen, 84, second baseman who hit .281 in 262 games with the New York Giants from 1926 to 1929; acting manager of 1960 Philadelphia Phillies for one game (April 14) between terms of Eddie Sawyer and Gene Mauch; younger brother Syd, an MLB pitcher, died earlier in 1988 (on April 9).
- October 30 – Bernie Walter, 80, pitcher for the 1930 Pittsburgh Pirates.

=== November ===
- November 1 – Lefty Sullivan, 72, pitcher for the 1939 Cleveland Indians.
- November 5 – Glenn Chapman, 82, infielder who hit .280 in 67 games for the 1934 Brooklyn Dodgers.
- November 9 – Bob Weiland, 82, left-hander who went 62–94 (4.24) in 277 games in a dozen seasons (1928–1935, 1937–1940) for five clubs, primarily the St. Louis Cardinals and Boston Red Sox.
- November 16 – Johnny Hayes, 78, two-time All-Star catcher who appeared for four Negro National League clubs, mainly the New York Black Yankees, between 1934 and 1948.
- November 19 – Kid Lowe, 88, third baseman for the Memphis Red Sox and three other Negro National League teams between 1921 and 1930.
- November 21 – Carl Hubbell, 85, "The Meal Ticket," Hall-of-Fame pitcher who won 253 games for the 1928–1943 New York Giants, then second-most among NL left-handers; named NL's MVP in 1933 and 1936, he led league in wins and ERA three times each and had 1.79 ERA in six World Series starts; his 1,677 strikeouts were NL record for portsiders until 1958, and he won 24 straight games in 1936–1937; in 1934 MLB All-Star Game, he fanned five straight eventual Hall of Famers, and his #11 uniform was retired upon his playing retirement; served Giants as their farm system director from 1944 until 1975.
- November 22 – Ray Kelly, 74, sportswriter who covered the Philadelphia Athletics and Phillies since the late 1940s.
- November 28 – Butch Davis, 72, outfielder who played in Black baseball, the Negro leagues (batting .341 for the 1947 Baltimore Elite Giants), independent leagues and, in 1951 and 1952, "organized" minor league baseball.
- November 30 – Wally Berger, 83, All-Star center fielder for the Boston Braves who had four 100-RBI seasons and batted .300 lifetime; led NL in homers and RBI in 1935; his 38 homers as a 1930 rookie (tied by Frank Robinson in 1956) stood as an MLB record until 1987.

=== December ===
- December 12 – Joe Reichler, 73, sportswriter and author who wrote for the Associated Press for 20 years and served as an assistant to the commissioner after 1966; editor of the Macmillan Baseball Encyclopedia since its first edition in 1969.
- December 16:
  - Joe Hatten, 72, pitcher who posted a 65–49 record with a 3.87 ERA for the Brooklyn Dodgers and Chicago Cubs from 1946 through 1952.
  - Bob Kahle, 73, pinch-hitter for the 1938 Boston Braves.
  - Leonard Lindsay, 79, first baseman who appeared for three Negro leagues clubs over four seasons between 1935 and 1947.
- December 21 – Willie Kamm, 88, third baseman for the Chicago White Sox (1923–1931) and Cleveland Indians (1931–1935) who led AL in fielding average eight times and in putouts seven times; batted .308 in 1928 and led league in walks in 1925.
- December 29:
  - John Happenny, 87, backup infielder who hit .221 in 32 games for the 1923 Chicago White Sox.
  - Earl Mossor, 63, pitcher who appeared in three games with the 1951 Brooklyn Dodgers.
- December 31 – Wes Flowers, 75, relief pitcher who posted a 2–2 record with a 5.40 ERA for the Brooklyn Dodgers in 1940 and 1944, and later served in the Navy during World War II.
