= Randy Asadoor =

American baseball player (born 1962)

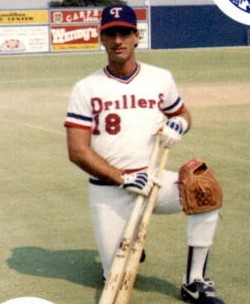
- Third baseman
- Born: October 20, 1962 (age 63); Fresno, California, U.S.
- Batted: Right Threw: Right

MLB debut
- September 14, 1986, for the San Diego Padres

Last MLB appearance
- October 5, 1986, for the San Diego Padres

MLB statistics
- Batting average: .364
- Home runs: 0
- RBI: 7
- Stats at Baseball Reference

Teams
- San Diego Padres (1986)

Randall Carl Asadoor (born October 20, 1962) is an American former professional baseball infielder. He played in Major League Baseball (MLB) for the San Diego Padres during the 1986 season.

Asadoor attended Bullard High School, which has also seen names like Steve Ellsworth, Dave Meier, Stan Papi and Rex Hudler pass through, before moving on to Fresno State University. In 1982, he played collegiate summer baseball with the Cotuit Kettleers of the Cape Cod Baseball League.

Asadoor was originally drafted by the Baltimore Orioles in the 11th round (286th overall) of the 1980 amateur entry draft. He decided not to sign and waited until 1983, when he was drafted by the Texas Rangers in the 3rd round (57th overall)-to sign.

From 1983 to 1986, Asadoor's played in the minor leagues. On September 14, 1986, at the age of 23, Asadoor made his major league debut with the Padres (to whom he had been traded to on April 6, 1985, for Mitch Williams).

He hit for a high batting average in his brief stint with the Padres, hitting .364 in 55 at-bats. However, this was the only glimpse of the majors that he would ever get. His poor defense may have been a factor in this, as in only 15 games at third base, he made 5 errors.
