= Bullard High School (Fresno, California) =

Public secondary school in Fresno, California, United States

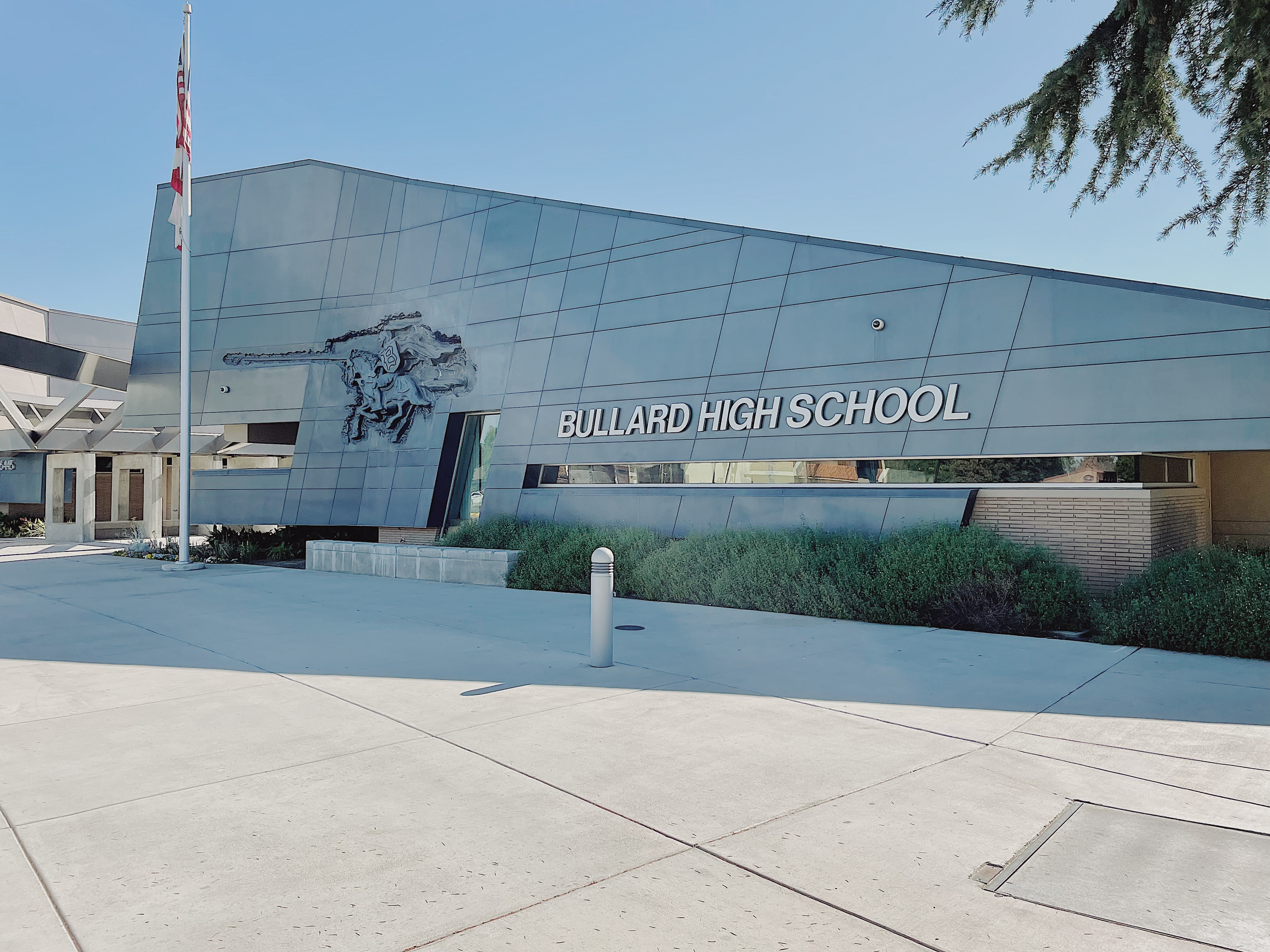
- Law, Justice, and Public Service Magnet

Location
- 5445 N. Palm Avenue; Fresno California 93704; United States; 36°49′02″N 119°48′36″W

Information
- Type: Public
- Founded: 1955
- School district: Fresno Unified School District
- CEEB code: 050973
- Principal: Alicia Jackson
- Faculty: 114.22 (on FTE basis)
- Grades: 9–12
- Enrollment: 2,371 (2023-2024)
- Student to teacher ratio: 20.76
- Colors: Navy, Columbia blue, and white
- Athletics conference: California Interscholastic Federation County Metro League
- Mascot: Knight
- Accreditation: WASC
- Publication: The Charger
- Yearbook: The Lance
- Website: bullard.fresnounified.org

Bullard High School is a public secondary school located in Fresno, California, United States. Founded in 1955 and recognized as one of Fresno's top public schools, it is part of the Fresno Unified School District, and as of 2011 had around 2,650 students on roll in grades 9–12, approximately 650 students per grade.

== History ==
The school is named after Edwin J. Bullard, a Fresno area farmer and former member of the Fresno Country Board of Supervisors. The Bullard geographical area originally had its own school district, named Bullard Unified, but it merged with Fresno Unified in 1958. Some parents discussed taking the Bullard area schools back out of Fresno Unified in 1991, primarily over funding concerns but it never moved beyond preliminary stages. Other attempts to disconnect the school from Fresno Unified occurred in 2011, when some parents proposed merging with Fresno and Edison High Schools, creating a new "Van Ness" school district and also in 2016, when teachers created a plan to convert Bullard to a charter school.

The campus has grown significantly since its founding in 1955. An all-weather track and field facility as well and an aquatic complex were added in the early 2010s. A three year construction project was completed in 2017 which included two new classrooms, a new administration building, and a new library media center. Solar panels were added over the parking lots in 2018.

The school was selected to host an early anti-plagiarism pilot program in 1999 by alumni John Barrie, who later created Turnitin. A 2014 bomb threat against the school led to two teenagers being arrested. In 2015, a student attacked a teacher and another student, which led to calls for stricter discipline. A cheating controversy marred the 2016 graduation, where the valedictorian leveled accusations against the teachers and administration; a school spokesman denied the claims. A Bullard cheerleader's 2019 video spawned widespread racial criticism. In May 2022, a picture taken in the school's weightroom sparked additional race-based outrage. Only a few months later at the start of the 2022-23 school year, the school gained further controversy over a new cell phone ban with implementation of Yondr pouches.

== Ethnic composition ==
As of the 2014–2015 school year, the student population was 41% Caucasian, 38% Hispanic, 13% African American, 5% Asian and 3% Other. Approximately 3% of the students have been identified as English Language Learners.

== Athletics ==
For much of its history, Bullard High has competed in the North Yosemite League, playing against the other public high schools in Fresno and Madera for over 40 years. In 2002, the school shifted over to the Tri-City League but after two years there, it moved to the County Metro League. Due to their close proximity on opposing sides of Fresno's 41 Freeway, a rivalry developed between Bullard and Hoover High School. The rivalry was dubbed the "Battle of Barstow" after a street both campuses share. However, as the competitive balance of the area high schools has shifted over the years, more rivalries have developed within league play.

Bullard High School offers a comprehensive Division I interscholastic athletics program with 24 different varsity-level sports. The athletics program has produced Major League Baseball players including Steve Ellsworth, Dave Meier, Stan Papi, Randy Asadoor and Rex Hudler. Former Fresno State and NFL quarterback Kevin Sweeney is another notable Bullard alumnus.

The school has had consistent success in baseball, softball, volleyball (boys and girls), tennis, water polo, and soccer. The school earned varsity football league championships in the Northern Yosemite League in 1962, 1966, 1967, 1977, 1981 and 1999, as well as in the County Metro League in 2004, 2005, 2008, 2009 and 2012. The 2009 varsity football team had success in the Division I Central Section playoffs and won the section title that year, being named Valley Champions. The girls tennis team had a string of section championships from 1987 to 1994. The 1999 girls volleyball team made a deep run in the CIF playoffs, beating Mira Costa and sweeping San Marcos before getting knocked out by top ranked Newport Harbor. The 2009 boys soccer team won a section title and were state championship runners-up. The girls soccer team won a section title in 2011 (also state championship runners-up) along with the boys basketball team that same year.

While not an alumnus, former National Football League head and assistant coach Mike Martz started his coaching career as an assistant coach for the Knights football team in 1973. Bullard's success under coach Tony Amundsen put them on the radar of Southern California basketball programs. Tony's older brother, Tim, took the reins of the basketball program in 2016.

== Notable alumni ==
- Randy Asadoor — San Diego Padres infielder
- Robert Alan Beuth — actor, playwright, sculptor
- Lynn Biyendolo — professional soccer player, Western New York Flash
- Joe Cooper — NFL kicker, Super Bowl champion
- Steve Ellsworth — Boston Red Sox pitcher
- Kevin Federline — entertainer and former husband of Britney Spears
- Andy Finch — professional snowboarder; halfpipe finals at the 2006 Winter Olympics in Turin, Italy
- Rex Hudler — Major League Baseball utility player
- Robert Kendrick — professional tennis player, well known for collegiate Div
- Dana Kimmell - Former actress and model
- Anthony McCoy — Seattle Seahawks tight end
- Dave Meier — Major League Baseball outfielder
- Stan Papi — Major League Baseball player
- Vern Poythress — Calvinist philosopher and theologian
- Kevin Sweeney — NFL quarterback
- Robert Westenberg — Tony-nominated Broadway actor
