= 1988 Junior League World Series =

Tournament information
- Location: Taylor, Michigan
- Dates: August 15–20

Final positions
- Champions: Mexicali, Mexico
- Runner-up: Hilo, Hawaii

The 1988 Junior League World Series took place from August 15–20 in Taylor, Michigan, United States. Mexicali, Mexico defeated Hilo, Hawaii in the championship game.

This year saw the debut of the Canada Region.

== Teams ==
United States	International
(Michigan) Taylor, Michigan; Northeast; Host	(Quebec) Sherbrooke, Quebec Canada
(Indiana) Hobart, Indiana Central	(Baja California) Mexicali, Baja California Mexico
(Pennsylvania) Philadelphia, Pennsylvania East	Manatí, Puerto Rico Puerto Rico
(Florida) Altamonte Springs, Florida South	
(Hawaii) Hilo, Hawaii West

== Results ==
Upper round 1	Upper round 2	Upper final	World Championship
—	Puerto Rico	0
—	Mexico	4
1–0	Mexico	3
1–0	Florida	0
—	Pennsylvania	2
—	Florida	9
2–0	Mexico (F/9)	9
2–0	Hawaii	7
—	Indiana	2
—	Hawaii	3
1–0	Hawaii	15
1–0	Canada	0
—	Canada	10
—	Michigan	2	3–0	Mexico	11	—
3–1	Hawaii	6	—
Lower round 1	Lower round 2	Lower round 3	Lower final
1–1	Canada	8
0–1	Puerto Rico	0	1–1	Pennsylvania	7	2–1	Hawaii	6
0–1	Pennsylvania	2	2–1	Canada	2	3–1	Florida	1
2–1	Florida (F/9)	5
1–1	Florida	10
0–1	Indiana	6	1–1	Indiana	2
0–1	Michigan	5

1988 Junior League World Series Champions
Mexicali, Mexico
