= George Nicolau =

American labor lawyer and arbitrator (1925–2020)

George Nicolau (February 14, 1925 – January 2, 2020) was a labor lawyer and arbitrator, president of the National Academy of Arbitrators, and chairman of Major League Baseball’s arbitration panel. He was also an arbitrator for the National Basketball Association and many other organizations in aviation, communications, sports, and entertainment.

Nicolau is best known for his decisions in the Major League Baseball collusion cases known as Collusion II and Collusion III, which resulted in a $280m settlement.

Nicolau's papers are deposited at the Tamiment Library and Robert F. Wagner Labor Archives at New York University.

A native of Detroit, Michigan, Nicolau died in New York City on January 2, 2020.
