= Art Hefner =

American baseball player (1913–1988)

- Center fielder
- Born: August 2, 1913; Brevard, North Carolina
- Died: May 2, 1988 (aged 74); Brevard, North Carolina
- Batted: Left Threw: Right

Negro league baseball debut
- April 25, 1948, for the New York Black Yankees

Last appearance
- September 18, 1949, for the Philadelphia Stars
- Stats at Baseball Reference

Teams
- New York Black Yankees (1948); Philadelphia Stars (1949)

James Chester Arthur Hefner Jr. (August 2, 1913 – May 2, 1988) was an American professional baseball center fielder in the Negro leagues. He played with the New York Black Yankees in 1948, and the Philadelphia Stars in 1949.

== Early life and career ==
Hefner was born in Transylvania County, North Carolina on August 2, 1913, the son of James Chester Arthur and Mary Hefner (né Davis). He made his Negro Major leagues debut on April 25, 1948, with the New York Black Yankees. In February 1949, following the disbanding of the Yankees (itself part of the larger Negro league contraction necessitated by the exodus of star players to the recently integrated Major Leagues), Heffner was initially drafted by the Birmingham Black Barons, but then acquired by Philadelphia prior to the start of the regular season.

== Post-retirement ==
Following his baseball career, Hefner was employed by DuPont and served as a deacon in the Bethel "A" Baptist Church in Brevard.
