= Edison Barrios =

Venezuelan baseball player (born 1988)

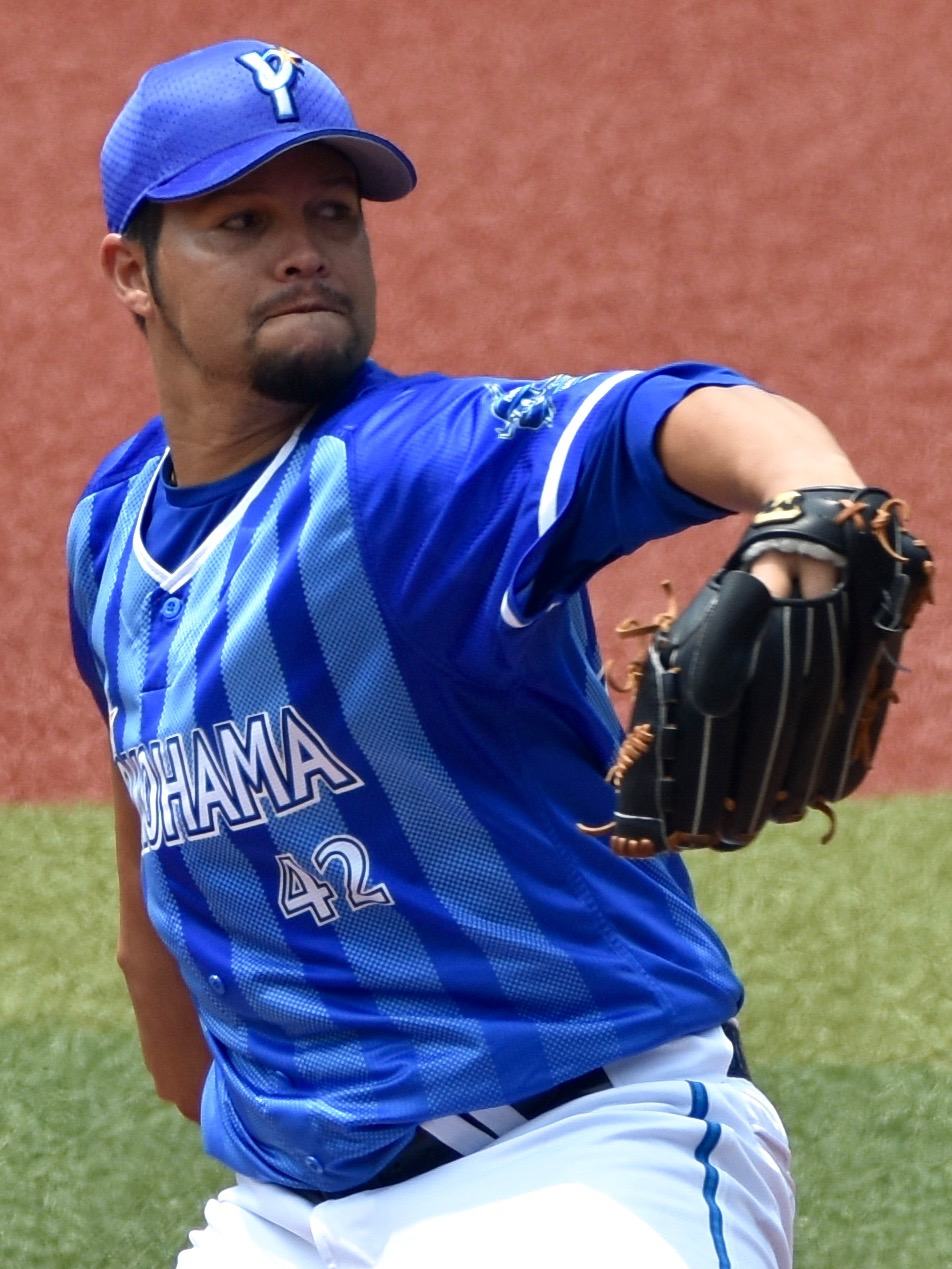
- Barrios in 2018
- Pitcher
- Born: October 11, 1988 (age 37); Villa de Cura, Aragua, Venezuela
- Batted: Right Threw: Right

NPB debut
- August 18, 2013, for the Fukuoka SoftBank Hawks

Last NPB appearance
- September 22, 2019, for the Yokohama DeNA BayStars

NPB statistics
- Win–loss record: 5–12
- Earned run average: 3.96
- Strikeouts: 111
- Stats at Baseball Reference

Teams
- Fukuoka SoftBank Hawks (2013–2016); Yokohama DeNA BayStars (2018–2019)

Career highlights and awards
- 2x Japan Series champion (2014, 2015)

Edison Ernesto Barrios Castillo (born October 11, 1988) is a Venezuelan former professional baseball pitcher. He played for the Pittsburgh Pirates organization, and in Nippon Professional Baseball (NPB) for the Fukuoka SoftBank Hawks and Yokohama DeNA BayStars.

== Career ==
=== Pittsburgh Pirates ===
Barrios began his professional career in 2006 with the Venezuelan Summer League Pirates of the Pittsburgh Pirates organization. He played for the VSL Pirates in the 2007 and 2008 seasons. He became a free agent following the season.

=== Fukuoka SoftBank Hawks ===
Barrios signed with the Fukuoka SoftBank Hawks of Nippon Professional Baseball for the 2011 season. He played for the club in the 2012, 2013, 2014, 2015, and 2016 seasons before becoming a free agent at the end of the 2016 season.

=== Yokohama DeNA BayStars ===
After not playing professional baseball in the 2017 season, Barrios signed with the Yokohama DeNA BayStars of Nippon Professional Baseball. He played for the team in the 2018 and 2019 seasons. On October 30, 2019, the BayStars announced that the team will not sign Barrios for the next season. On December 2, 2019, he became a free agent.

=== Diablos Rojos del Mexico ===
On April 2, 2020, Barrios signed with the Diablos Rojos del Mexico of the Mexican League. Barrios did not play in a game in 2020 due to the cancellation of the Mexican League season because of the COVID-19 pandemic. On September 7, Barrios was released by the Diablos.
