= Greg Tabor =

American baseball player (born 1961)

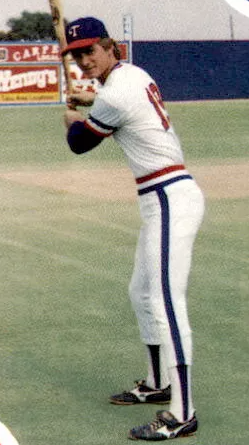
- Tabor with the Tulsa Drillers c. 1984
- Second baseman
- Born: May 21, 1961 (age 63); Castro Valley, California
- Batted: Right Threw: Right

MLB debut
- September 10, 1987, for the Texas Rangers

Last MLB appearance
- October 4, 1987, for the Texas Rangers

MLB statistics
- Batting average: .111
- Home runs: 0
- Runs batted in: 1

Teams
- Texas Rangers (1987)

Greg Steven Tabor (born May 21, 1961) is a former right-handed Major League Baseball second baseman and pinch runner who played for the Texas Rangers in 1987.

== Baseball career and statistics ==
Drafted by the Rangers 10th overall in the January Regular phase of the 1981 amateur draft, Tabor split time with the GCL Rangers and Asheville Tourists that year. Combined, he hit .193 in 161 at-bats that season.

In 1982, Tabor played for the Burlington Rangers and Tulsa Drillers, he hit .240 with 32 stolen bases in 392 at-bats. He spent 1983 with the Drillers, hitting .268 with 30 stolen bases in 370 at-bats. Again with the Drillers in 1984, he hit .299 with 22 stolen bases in 462 at-bats.

Tabor spent all of 1985, 1986 and 1987 with the Oklahoma City 89ers. With the 89ers in 1985, he hit .222 in 81 at-bats. He hit .284 in 401 at-bats in 1986, and in 1987 he hit .303 with 22 stolen bases in 528 at-bats. He made his major league debut that year on September 10. He pinch ran for Larry Parrish against the California Angels, and in his sole at-bat he popped out. He did however score a run in his first game. Tabor appeared in nine games in 1987, collecting one hit in nine at-bats for a .111 batting average. Used often as a pinch runner, he scored four runs. He played his final game on October 4.

On March 17, 1988, he was traded to the Chicago Cubs with Ray Hayward for Dave Meier. Tabor and Paul Noce battled for the 25th roster spot in spring training of 1988, however the Cubs signed Angel Salazar, and gave him the 25th spot. He played in 130 games for their Triple-A team the Iowa Cubs in 1988, hitting .267, walking only 19 times in 469 at-bats.

Overall, he hit .272 with 145 stolen bases in 800 minor league games. He scored 404 runs and drove 310 in.
