= Ray Hayward =

American baseball player (born 1961)

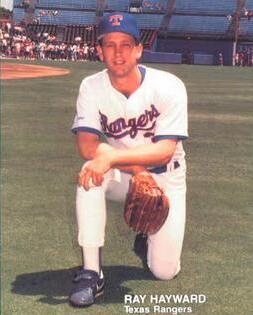
- Hayward with the Texas Rangers c. 1988

Texas Tech Red Raiders
- Pitcher / Coach
- Born: April 27, 1961 (age 65); Enid, Oklahoma, U.S.
- Batted: Left Threw: Left

MLB debut
- September 20, 1986, for the San Diego Padres

Last MLB appearance
- July 5, 1988, for the Texas Rangers

MLB statistics
- Earned run average: 6.75
- Win–loss record: 4–8
- Strikeouts: 45
- Stats at Baseball Reference

Teams
- San Diego Padres (1986–1987); Texas Rangers (1988)

Raymond Alton Hayward (born April 27, 1961) is an American former professional baseball left-handed starting pitcher. He played in Major League Baseball (MLB) from 1986 to 1988 for the San Diego Padres and Texas Rangers. He is currently the pitching coach for the collegiate Texas Tech Red Raiders baseball team.

== Career ==
=== College career ===
Prior to playing professional baseball, Hayward attended the University of Oklahoma. In 1980, he went 9–2 with a 3.19 ERA and 78 strikeouts in 93 innings of work. The following year, he went 9–2 with a 1.70 ERA, striking out 75 batters in 69 innings. He appeared in only three games in 1982, going 1–1 with a 2.40 ERA. In his final college season – 1983 – he went 7–6 with a 3.40 ERA and 125 strikeouts in 98 innings of work.

=== MLB draft ===
Originally, he was drafted in the 12th round of the 1982 amateur draft by the Pittsburgh Pirates. Choosing not to sign that time, he was drafted 10th overall in the 1983 amateur draft by the Padres, at which time he did choose to sign.

=== Professional baseball ===
==== 1983 ====
Hayward began his professional career with the Beaumont Golden Gators, going 5–1 with a 1.76 ERA and 71 strikeouts in 66 1/3 innings of work. He completed five and shutout two of the 10 games he started.

==== 1984 ====
In 1984, Hayward pitched for the Las Vegas Stars, going 9–6 with a 4.87 ERA. In 26 games (24 starts), he had one complete game and one shutout. He struck out 91 batters in 129 1/3 innings of work.

==== 1985 ====
Hayward did not play in 1985.

==== 1986 ====
Again pitching for Las Vegas in 1986, Hayward went 9–11 with a 4.63 ERA in 26 games (25 starts). He earned a late September call up, and on September 20 he made his big league debut. Making the start against Houston Astros ace Mike Scott, Hayward lasted only 1 1/3 innings, allowing seven hits and six earned runs. He'd start in two more games that year, going 0–2 with a 9.00 ERA overall.

==== 1987 ====
1987 was Hayward's best minor league season since his professional rookie year. In 23 games (22 starts), he went 8–5 with a 3.10 ERA. In 142 1/3 innings, he struck out 115 batters. So impressive it was in fact that the Padres recalled him, and on June 10 he made his first big league appearance of the 1987 season. Over the span of a couple of weeks, he'd make four relief appearances, going 0–0 with a 16.50 ERA. In his first game back, he allowed six runs in an inning of work.

==== 1988 ====
Hayward was traded along with Goose Gossage from the Padres to the Chicago Cubs for Keith Moreland and Mike Brumley on February 12, 1988. He was again traded on March 17, this time to the Rangers for Dave Meier and Greg Tabor.

Pitching for the Oklahoma City 89ers, Hayward went 3–2 with a 3.86 ERA in eight games. He earned an extended stay with the Rangers that season, starting 12 games and going 4–6 with a 5.46 ERA. Hayward pitched in his final big league game on July 5, 1988.

==== 1989 ====
Although he would not play in the majors after 1988, he did continue to pitch in the minor leagues. Hayward did not play in 1989, however.

==== 1990 ====
He pitched for the 89ers in 1990, Hayward went 5–9 with a 5.16 ERA in 89 innings.

==== 1991 ====
1991 was Hayward's final professional season. He pitched for both the Tulsa Drillers and the 89ers, going a combined 3–6 with a 4.72 ERA in 76 1/3 innings.

=== Major league totals ===
Overall, Hayward went 4–8 with a 6.75 ERA, one complete game and one shutout in 19 games (15 starts). In 78 2/3 innings of work, he allowed 10 home runs and 42 walks, and he struck out 45 batters.

=== Non-playing career ===
Following the conclusion of his playing career, Hayward would serve as an area scout for the Detroit Tigers from 1994 to 1999. In 2000, Hayward received his first coaching job with his alma mater, the Oklahoma Sooners. Hayward held the pitching coach and recruiting coordinator positions at OU until 2004, when he accepted the position as the Midwest scouting supervisor for the Miami Marlins.

Hayward would serve as the scouting supervisor for the Marlins from 2005 to 2012 before accepting the pitching coach position at Texas Tech under coach Tim Tadlock. In his second season in 2013–14, Hayward helped guide the Red Raiders to their first NCAA Division I Baseball Championship appearance since 2004 as well as the program's first super regional victory and College World Series appearance. Texas Tech's pitchers would accumulate a season long Earned run average of 3.17 which was the lowest for the team since 1971. Through the regional and super regional rounds of the NCAA tournament, Haywood's pitching staff produced an ERA of 0.65 and held four opponents to 0 runs, earning a berth in the College World Series. The season long total of 9 shutouts set a school record. He has served as special assistant to the Texas Tech baseball program since 2018.
