= Dave Meier =

American baseball player (born 1959)

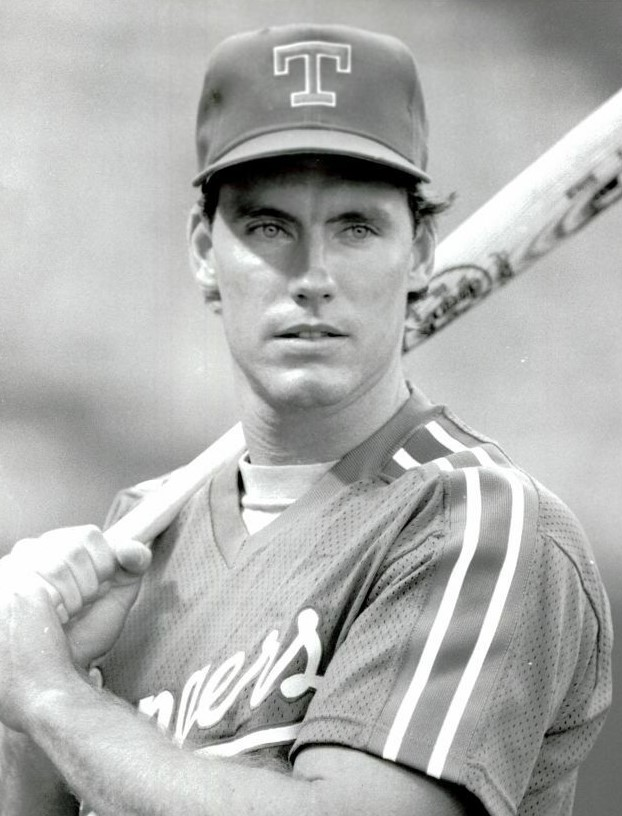
- Outfielder
- Born: August 8, 1959 (age 66); Helena, Montana
- Batted: Right Threw: Right

MLB debut
- April 3, 1984, for the Minnesota Twins

Last MLB appearance
- September 29, 1988, for the Minnesota Twins

MLB statistics
- Batting average: .253
- Home runs: 1
- Runs batted in: 22
- Stats at Baseball Reference

Teams
- Minnesota Twins (1984–1985); Texas Rangers (1987); Chicago Cubs (1988)

David Keith Meier (born August 8, 1959) is a former Major League Baseball left fielder, who also played a few games at third base and as a designated hitter.

== Early life and education ==
Meier attended Bullard High School in Fresno, California and then went on to attend Stanford University and Fresno City College. While at Stanford, Meier played for head coach Mark Marquess, who went on to lead the United States to the Olympic gold medal. "He was tough, a real disciplinarian," Meier told the Chicago Tribune in 1988. "At that age we probably needed it. I went back to visit a few years later, and he was real nice. I thought, 'Is this the same guy?'"

== Early baseball career ==
Standing at 6 ft 0 in (1.83 m) and 185 pounds, Meier, a right-hander, was originally drafted by the St. Louis Cardinals in the third round, 61st overall, of the 1978 draft, but he opted not to sign. In 1981, he was drafted by the Minnesota Twins in the 5th round, 113th overall, and at that point, decided to sign.

An overall good contact hitter in the minors who showed some pop, Meier had his best season in 1983 with the Triple-A Toledo Mud Hens, when he hit .336 with 8 home runs and 21 doubles in 126 games. He started the 1984 season on the Opening Day roster, making his big league debut as a pinch hitter on April 3. He went 0 for 1 in his debut.

Meier spent the majority of his major league career as a back-up/pinch hitter, with his best season being 1985, when he hit .260 with 1 home run and 8 RBI in 104 at-bats (74 games). He finished his career hitting .253, with 1 home run, 15 doubles, 1 triple, 22 RBI and 37 runs scored in 145 games. He committed four errors in his career for a fielding percentage of .978.

== Stint with the Chicago Cubs ==
On March 17, 1988, the Rangers traded Meier and Greg Tabor to the Chicago Cubs for Ray Hayward. In September 1988, the Cubs promoted Meier to the major league team from its AAA Iowa Cubs minor league team after Iowa's season was over. The Cubs found Meier while he was enjoying a postseason vacation in Lake Tahoe, Nevada. "I was in Tahoe," he told the Chicago Sun-Times. "I don't know how they found me, but when they did, I said, 'Who, me? I haven't played in eight days.' But I was thrilled. I got here as fast as I could."

Meier played his final major league game on September 29, 1988 for the Cubs at the age of 29. He went 1–1 as a pinch hitter in his final game.

== Retirement ==
In March 1989, Meier retired.

== Today ==
Meier currently resides in San Diego, California.
