= Stan Papi =

American baseball player (born 1951)

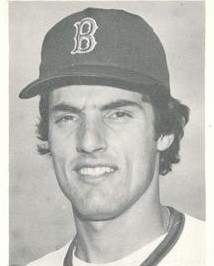
- Infielder
- Born: February 4, 1951 (age 75); Fresno, California, U.S.
- Batted: Right Threw: Right

MLB debut
- April 11, 1974, for the St. Louis Cardinals

Last MLB appearance
- October 1, 1981, for the Detroit Tigers

MLB statistics
- Batting average: .218
- Home runs: 7
- Runs batted in: 51
- Stats at Baseball Reference

Teams
- St. Louis Cardinals (1974); Montreal Expos (1977–1978); Boston Red Sox (1979–1980); Detroit Tigers (1980–1981)

Stanley Gerard Papi (/ˈpæpi/ PAP-ee; born February 4, 1951) is an American former Major League Baseball player perhaps most remembered for being traded by the Montreal Expos to the Boston Red Sox for Bill Lee during the 1978-79 off-season.

== Career ==
Papi was born in Fresno, California, and was drafted by the Houston Astros in the 2nd round of the 1969 amateur draft but was traded to St. Louis and then Montreal, where he played part of 1977 and 1978 with the Expos.

The Red Sox had a Gold Glove-caliber shortstop in Rick Burleson, and the trade for a light-hitting utility shortstop as Papi for a left-handed pitcher of some quality, was denounced by fans and even questioned by Red Sox team captain and future Hall of Famer Carl Yastrzemski. Shortly after the trade of Lee for Papi was announced, the graffiti "Who the hell is Stan Papi?" was painted on the exterior wall of the Green Monster at Fenway Park. Although Fenway Park staff painted over the graffiti many times, the sentence continued to re-appear until Bill Lee retired in 1982.

In Montreal, Lee went on to win 16 games in 1979 while Papi proved a bust in Boston. Lee was instrumental to the Expos achieving their first winning record (95–65) under manager Dick Williams, Lee's first manager. With a 16–10 won loss record, 3.04 earned run average and three shutouts, Lee proved very valuable to Montreal. Papi appeared in 50 games and hit .188 with one home run and six runs batted in 117 at bats. After appearing in one game in 1980, he was sent to the Philadelphia Phillies to complete an earlier trade for catcher Dave Rader. He was sent to the Phillies' minor league affiliate in Oklahoma City, and never appeared with the major league club. Just over two weeks later, he was sold to the Detroit Tigers, where he ended his career in 1981.

In his six major league seasons, Papi hit .218 with 7 home runs and 51 RBIs in 225 games.
