= 2000 Colorado Rockies season =

Major League Baseball season

2000 Colorado Rockies
- League: National League
- Division: West
- Ballpark: Coors Field
- City: Denver, Colorado
- Record: 82–80 (.506)
- Divisional place: 4th
- Owner: Jerry McMorris
- General manager: Dan O'Dowd
- Manager: Buddy Bell
- Television: KWGN-TV; Fox Sports Rocky Mountain (George Frazier, Dave Armstrong)
- Radio: KOA (AM) (Wayne Hagin, Jeff Kingery); KCUV (Antonio Guevara)
- Stats: ESPN.com; Baseball Reference

The Colorado Rockies' 2000 season was the eighth for the Rockies. They competed in the National League West. Buddy Bell was their manager. They played home games at Coors Field. They finished with a record of 82–80, fourth in the NL West. Despite the team finishing fourth in their division and finishing with a mediocre record, the team batted excellently; the 2000 Rockies combined for a team batting average of .294, which was the integration era's highest mark since the 1950 Boston Red Sox batted .302. They led the league in hits; finished 2nd in on-base percentage (tied with the San Francisco Giants) and runs scored; and third in stolen bases (tied with the San Diego Padres).

== Offseason ==
- October 30, 1999: Dante Bichette was traded by the Colorado Rockies with cash to the Cincinnati Reds for Stan Belinda and Jeffrey Hammonds.
- November 16, 1999: Darryl Kile was traded by the Colorado Rockies with Luther Hackman and Dave Veres to the St. Louis Cardinals for Manny Aybar, Brent Butler, Rich Croushore, and José Jiménez.
- November 17, 1999: Curt Leskanic was traded by the Colorado Rockies to the Milwaukee Brewers for Mike Myers.
- November 21, 1999: Julián Tavárez was selected off waivers by the Colorado Rockies from the San Francisco Giants.
- December 9, 1999: Tom Goodwin was signed as a free agent by the Colorado Rockies.
- December 13, 1999: Vinny Castilla was traded by the Colorado Rockies to the Tampa Bay Devil Rays for Rolando Arrojo and Aaron Ledesma.
- December 13, 1999: Jamey Wright was traded by the Colorado Rockies with Henry Blanco to the Milwaukee Brewers for Jeff Cirillo and Scott Karl.
- December 16, 1999: Brent Mayne was signed as a free agent by the Colorado Rockies.
- January 14, 2000: Bobby Jones was traded by the Colorado Rockies with Lariel González to the New York Mets for Masato Yoshii.
- March 31, 2000: Brian Hunter was signed as a free agent by the Colorado Rockies.

== Regular season ==
=== Opening Day starters ===
24	Tom Goodwin	CF
3	Mike Lansing	2B
33	Larry Walker	RF
7	Jeff Cirillo	3B
17	Todd Helton	1B
4	Jeffrey Hammonds	LF
5	Neifi Perez	SS
8	Brent Mayne	C
34	Pedro Astacio	P

=== Season standings ===
NL West
Team	W	L	Pct.	GB	Home	Road
San Francisco Giants	97	65	.599	—	55‍–‍26	42‍–‍39
Los Angeles Dodgers	86	76	.531	11	44‍–‍37	42‍–‍39
Arizona Diamondbacks	85	77	.525	12	47‍–‍34	38‍–‍43
Colorado Rockies	82	80	.506	15	48‍–‍33	34‍–‍47
San Diego Padres	76	86	.469	21	41‍–‍40	35‍–‍46

=== Record vs. opponents ===
2000 National League record Source: NL Standings Head-to-Head
Team	AZ	ATL	CHC	CIN	COL	FLA	HOU	LAD	MIL	MON	NYM	PHI	PIT	SD	SF	STL	AL
Arizona	—	3–6	5–4	2–5	7–6	4–5	6–1	7–6	4–5	4–5	2–7	8–1	7–2	9–4	6–7	5–4	6–9
Atlanta	6–3	—	4–5	2–5	5–4	6–6	5–4	7–2	6–3	6–7	7–6	8–5	5–2	8–1	6–3	3–4	11–7
Chicago	4–5	5–4	—	4–8	4–5	1–6	5–7	3–6	6–7	4–5	2–5	6–3	3–9	3–5	4–5	3–10	8–7
Cincinnati	5–2	5–2	8–4	—	6–3	3–6	7–5	4–5	5–8–1	6–3	5–4	3–4	7–6	4–5	3–6	7–6	7–8
Colorado	6–7	4–5	5–4	3–6	—	4–5	5–4	4–9	4–5	7–2	3–6	6–3	7–2	7–6	6–7	5–3	6–6
Florida	5–4	6–6	6–1	6–3	5–4	—	3–5	2–7	3–4	7–6	6–6	9–4	5–4	2–7	3–6	3–6	8–9
Houston	1–6	4–5	7–5	5–7	4–5	5–3	—	3–6	7–6	4–5	2–5	5–4	10–3	2–7	1–8	6–6	6–9
Los Angeles	6–7	2–7	6–3	5–4	9–4	7–2	6–3	—	3–4	5–3	4–5	5–4	4–5	8–5	7–5	3–6	6–9
Milwaukee	5–4	3–6	7–6	8–5–1	5–4	4–3	6–7	4–3	—	4–5	2–7	2–5	7–5	2–7	3–6	5–7	6–9
Montreal	5–4	7–6	5–4	3–6	2–7	6–7	5–4	3–5	5–4	—	3–9	5–7	3–4	3–6	3–6	2–5	7–11
New York	7–2	6–7	5–2	4–5	6–3	6–6	5–2	5–4	7–2	9–3	—	6–7	7–2	3–6	3–5	6–3	9–9
Philadelphia	1–8	5–8	3–6	4–3	3–6	4–9	4–5	4–5	5–2	7–5	7–6	—	3–6	2–5	2–7	2–7	9–9
Pittsburgh	2–7	2–5	9–3	6–7	2–7	4–5	3–10	5–4	5–7	4–3	2–7	6–3	—	7–2	2–6	4–8	6–9
San Diego	4–9	1–8	5–3	5–4	6–7	7–2	7–2	5–8	7–2	6–3	6–3	5–2	2–7	—	5–7	0–9	5–10
San Francisco	7–6	3–6	5–4	6–3	7–6	6–3	8–1	5–7	6–3	6–3	5–3	7–2	6–2	7–5	—	5–4	8–7
St. Louis	4–5	4–3	10–3	6–7	3–5	6–3	6–6	6–3	7–5	5–2	3–6	7–2	8–4	9–0	4–5	—	7–8

=== Transactions ===
- April 7, 2000: Manny Aybar was traded by the Colorado Rockies to the Cincinnati Reds for Gabe White.
- June 5, 2000: Garrett Atkins was drafted by the Colorado Rockies in the 5th round of the 2000 amateur draft. Player signed June 22, 2000.
- June 5, 2000: Clint Barmes was drafted by the Colorado Rockies in the 10th round of the 2000 amateur draft. Player signed June 9, 2000.
- June 5, 2000: Brad Hawpe was drafted by the Colorado Rockies in the 11th round of the 2000 amateur draft. Player signed June 21, 2000.
- July 15, 2000: Todd Sears (minors) was traded by the Colorado Rockies to the Minnesota Twins for Butch Huskey and Todd Walker.
- July 27, 2000: Rolando Arrojo was traded by the Colorado Rockies with Rich Croushore and Mike Lansing to the Boston Red Sox for Jeff Frye, Brian Rose, John Wasdin, and Jeff Taglienti (minors).
- July 31, 2000: Todd Hollandsworth was traded by the Los Angeles Dodgers with Kevin Gibbs (minors) and Randey Dorame (minors) to the Colorado Rockies for Tom Goodwin and cash.

=== Major League debuts ===
- Batters:
  - Bubba Carpenter (May 13)
  - Juan Pierre (Aug 7)
  - Elvis Peña (Sep 2)
- Pitchers:
  - Craig House (Aug 6)

=== Roster ===
2000 Colorado Rockies
Roster
Pitchers: 30 Rolando Arrojo; 34 Pedro Astacio; 38 Manny Aybar; 37 Stan Belinda; 48 Rigo Beltrán; 41 Brian Bohanon; 47 Giovanni Carrara; 43 Bobby Chouinard; 54 Rich Croushore; 44 Mike DeJean; 45 Jerry DiPoto; 48 Craig House; 32 Kevin Jarvis; 49 José Jiménez; 19 Scott Karl; 51 David Lee; 31 David Moraga; 28 Mike Myers; 40 Brian Rose; 50 Julián Tavárez; 54 Pete Walker; 46 John Wasdin; 36 Gabe White; 21 Masato Yoshii	Catchers: 8 Brent Mayne; 15 Ben Petrick; 29 Scott Servais; Infielders: 7 Jeff Cirillo; 39 Angel Echevarria; 2 Jeff Frye; 17 Todd Helton; 3 Mike Lansing; 18 Aaron Ledesma; 23 Jeff Manto; 20 Adam Melhuse; 23 Elvis Peña; 5 Neifi Pérez; 14,12 Todd Walker	Outfielders: 31 Darren Bragg; 23 Bubba Carpenter; 24 Tom Goodwin; 4 Jeffrey Hammonds; 27 Todd Hollandsworth; 12 Brian Hunter; 36 Butch Huskey; 29 Carlos Mendoza; 6 Juan Pierre; 22 Terry Shumpert; 33 Larry Walker	Manager: 25 Buddy Bell; Coaches: 00 Brad Andress; 26 Rich Donnelly (third base); 1 Dave Garcia (asst. coach); 11 Toby Harrah (bench); 13 Clint Hurdle (hitting); 16 Fred Kendall (bullpen); 53 Marcel Lachemann (pitching); 20 Dallas Williams (first base)

== Player stats ==
= Indicates team leader

=== Batting ===
==== Starters by position ====
Note: Pos = Position; G = Games played; AB = At bats; H = Hits; Avg. = Batting average; HR = Home runs; RBI = Runs batted in: SB = Stolen bases

Pos	Player	G	AB	H	Avg.	HR	RBI	SB
C	Brent Mayne	117	335	101	.301	6	64	1
1B	Todd Helton	160	580	216	.372	42	147	5
2B	Mike Lansing	90	365	94	.258	11	47	8
SS	Neifi Pérez	162	651	187	.287	10	71	3
3B	Jeff Cirillo	157	598	195	.326	11	115	3
LF	Larry Walker	87	314	97	.309	9	51	5
CF	Tom Goodwin	91	317	86	.271	5	47	39
RF	Jeffrey Hammonds	122	454	152	.335	20	106	14

==== Other batters ====
Note: G = Games played; AB = At bats; H = Hits; Avg. = Batting average; HR = Home runs; RBI = Runs batted in; SB = Stolen bases

Player	G	AB	H	Avg.	HR	RBI	SB
Darren Bragg	71	149	33	.221	3	21	4
Bubba Carpenter	15	27	6	.222	3	5	0
Angel Echevarria	10	9	1	.111	0	2	0
Jeff Frye	37	87	31	.356	0	3	4
Brian Hunter	72	200	55	.275	1	13	15
Butch Huskey	45	92	32	.348	4	18	1
Todd Hollandsworth	56	167	54	.323	11	23	7
Aaron Ledesma	32	40	9	.225	0	3	0
Jeff Manto	7	5	4	.800	1	4	0
Adam Melhuse	23	23	4	.175	0	4	0
Carlos Mendoza	13	10	1	.100	0	0	1
Ben Petrick	52	146	47	.322	3	20	1
Elvis Pena	10	9	3	.333	0	1	1
Juan Pierre	51	200	62	.310	0	20	7
Scott Servais	33	101	22	.218	1	13	0
Terry Shumpert	115	263	68	.259	9	40	8
Todd Walker	57	171	54	.316	7	36	4

=== Pitching ===
==== Starting pitchers ====
Note: G = Games pitched; IP = Innings pitched; W = Wins; L = Losses; ERA = Earned run average; SO = Strikeouts

Player	G	IP	W	L	ERA	SO
Pedro Astacio	32	196.1	12	9	5.27	193
Brian Bohanon	34	177.0	12	10	4.68	98
Masato Yoshii	29	167.1	6	15	5.86	88
Kevin Jarvis	30	115.0	3	4	5.95	60
Rolando Arrojo	19	101.1	5	9	6.04	80
Brian Rose	12	63.2	4	5	5.51	40
Rigo Beltrán	1	1.1	0	0	40.50	1

==== Relief pitchers ====
Note: G = Games pitched; IP = Innings pitched; W = Wins; L = Losses; ERA = Earned run average; SO = Strikeouts; SV = Saves

Player	G	IP	W	L	ERA	SO	SV
Manny Aybar	1	1.2	0	1	16.20	0	0
Stan Belinda	46	35.2	1	3	7.07	40	1
Giovanni Carrara	8	13.1	0	1	12.83	15	0
Bobby Chouinard	31	32.2	2	2	3.86	23	0
Rich Croushore	6	11.1	2	0	8.74	11	0
Mike DeJean	54	53.1	4	4	4.89	34	0
Craig House	16	13.2	1	1	7.24	8	0
José Jiménez	72	70.2	5	2	3.18	44	24
David Lee	7	5.2	0	0	11.12	6	1
David Moraga	1	1.0	0	0	45.00	0	0
Mike Myers	78	45.1	0	1	1.99	41	1
Julián Tavárez	51	120.0	11	5	4.43	62	1
Pete Walker	3	4.2	0	0	17.36	2	0
John Wasdin	14	35.2	0	3	5.80	35	0
Gabe White	67	83.0	11	2	2.17	82	5

==== Other pitchers ====
Note: G = Games pitched; IP = Innings pitched; W = Wins; L = Losses; ERA = Earned run average; SO = Strikeouts; SV = Saves

Player	G	IP	W	L	ERA	SO	SV
Scott Karl	17	65.2	2	3	7.68	29	0
Julián Tavárez	51	120.0	11	5	4.43	62	1
John Wasdin	14	35.2	0	3	5.80	35	0

== Game log ==
2000 Game Log
April: 11-14 (Home: 6-4; Away: 5-10)

#	Date	Opponent	Score	Win	Loss	Save	Attendance	Record
1	April 3	@ Braves	2–0	Maddux (1–0)	Astacio (0–1)	Remlinger (1)	42,255	0–1
2	April 4	@ Braves	5–3	Tavárez (1–0)	Burkett (0–1)	Jiménez (1)	26,132	1–1
3	April 5	@ Braves	9–6	Chen (1–0)	Aybar (0–1)	Ligtenberg (1)	30,008	1–2
4	April 7	@ Marlins	4–3	Penny (1–0)	Yoshii (0–1)	Alfonseca (2)	13,803	1–3
5	April 8	@ Marlins	4–2	Jiménez (1–0)	Fernandez (1–1)	Lee (1)	20,077	2–3
6	April 9	@ Marlins	7–6	Dempster (1–1)	Astacio (0–2)	Alfonseca (3)	16,463	2–4
7	April 10	Reds	7–5	Arrojo (1–0)	Parris (0–2)	Belinda (1)	48,094	3–4
8	April 11	Reds	10–3	Villone (2–0)	Bohanon (0–1)		40,488	3–5
9	April 12	Reds	7–5	Jiménez (2–0)	Reyes (0–1)	Tavárez (1)	38,339	4–5
10	April 13	Cardinals	12–6	Croushore (1–0)	Kile (2–1)		39,365	5–5
11	April 14	Cardinals	6–2	Astacio (1–2)	Ankiel (1–1)		40,248	6–5
12	April 16	Cardinals	9–3	Hentgen (3–0)	Arrojo (1–1)		43,029	6–6
13	April 16	Cardinals	14–13	Jiménez (3–0)	Mohler (0–1)	White (1)	35,095	7–6
14	April 17	@ Diamondbacks	9–1	Yoshii (1–1)	Daal (0–1)		33,743	8–6
15	April 18	@ Diamondbacks	7–1	Reynoso (1–2)	Karl (0–1)		30,275	8–7
16	April 19	@ Diamondbacks	8–7	Morgan (1–0)	Tavárez (1–1)	Kim (1)	31,237	8–8
17	April 20	@ Diamondbacks	3–0	Johnson (4–0)	Arrojo (1–2)		34,458	8–9
18	April 21	@ Cardinals	6–4	Jarvis (1–0)	Hentgen (3–1)	Jiménez (2)	34,966	9–9
19	April 22	@ Cardinals	7–6	Croushore (2–0)	James (0–1)	Jiménez (3)	42,901	10–9
20	April 23	@ Cardinals	6–3 (7)	Benes (2–1)	Karl (0–2)	Slocumb (1)	30,253	10–10
21	April 25	@ Expos	10–4	Pavano (3–0)	Bohanon (0–2)		10,019	10–11
22	April 26	@ Expos	9–2	Hermanson (3–1)	Jarvis (1–1)	Urbina (6)	10,735	10–12
23	April 28	Mets	12–5	Astacio (2–2)	Hampton (2–4)		45,366	11–12
24	April 29	Mets	13–6	Reed (3–0)	Yoshii (1–2)		41,220	11–13
25	April 30	Mets	14–11	Leiter (2–0)	Bohanon (0–3)		36,252	11–14

May: 17-8 (Home: 13-2; Away: 4-6)

#	Date	Opponent	Score	Win	Loss	Save	Attendance	Record
26	May 1	Expos	15–8	White (1–0)	Hermanson (3–2)		35,104	12–14
27	May 2	Expos	12–6	Karl (1–2)	Powell (0–2)		39,132	13–14
28	May 3	Expos	16–7	Astacio (3–2)	Irabu (1–3)		40,096	14–14
29	May 5	@ Giants	5–0	Nathan (2–0)	Yoshii (1–3)		40,930	14–15
30	May 6	@ Giants	6–0	Estes (2–1)	Arrojo (1–3)		40,930	14–16
31	May 8	@ Astros	3–1	Astacio (4–2)	Holt (1–5)		33,195	15–16
32	May 9	@ Astros	13–8	Pérez (2–1)	Tavárez (1–2)		32,130	15–17
33	May 10	@ Astros	5–1	Reynolds (5–0)	Yoshii (1–4)		34,265	15–18
34	May 12	Giants	15–7	Bohanon (1–3)	Nathan (2–1)		42,566	16–18
35	May 13	Giants	10–9	White (2–0)	Johnstone (2–3)	Jiménez (4)	44,829	17–18
36	May 14	Giants	11–7	White (3–0)	Hernández (2–5)		44,577	18–18
37	May 16	@ Mets	4–3 (11)	Tavárez (2–2)	Wendell (2–2)	Jiménez (5)	25,697	19–18
38	May 17	@ Mets	4–2	Leiter (5–0)	Arrojo (1–4)	Franco (2)	23,665	19–19
39	May 19	@ Phillies	10–2	Astacio (5–2)	Ashby (2–4)		14,202	20–19
40	May 20	@ Phillies	4–3	Tavárez (3–2)	Brock (0–4)	Jiménez (6)	19,192	21–19
41	May 21	@ Phillies	4–3	Person (4–2)	Yoshii (1–5)	Brantley (2)	20,612	21–20
42	May 23	Cubs	10–7	Bohanon (2–3)	Garibay (0–1)		41,264	22–20
43	May 24	Cubs	9–4	Astacio (6–2)	Farnsworth (1–5)	Jiménez (7)	40,046	23–20
44	May 25	Cubs	6–5	Lieber (5–3)	DeJean (0–1)	Aguilera (7)	43,178	23–21
45	May 26	Pirates	2–1	Córdova (2–4)	Yoshii (1–6)	Williams (7)	40,188	23–22
46	May 27	Pirates	7–6	White (4–0)	Christiansen (1–3)		42,184	24–22
47	May 28	Pirates	11–2	Arrojo (2–4)	Anderson (1–3)		41,641	25–22
48	May 29	Astros	8–7	White (5–0)	Cabrera (0–1)	Jiménez (8)	41,231	26–22
49	May 30	Astros	10–7	Belinda (1–0)	Valdes (1–1)	Jiménez (9)	38,032	27–22
50	May 31	Astros	8–6	White (6–0)	Slusarski (0–3)	Jiménez (10)	39,241	28–22

June: 15-10 (Home: 10-3; Away: 5-7)

#	Date	Opponent	Score	Win	Loss	Save	Attendance	Record
51	June 2	@ Brewers	8–6	Arrojo (3–4)	Bere (3–4)	Myers (1)	14,110	29–22
52	June 3	@ Brewers	2–1 (12)	De Los Santos (1–2)	Belinda (1–1)		20,730	29–23
53	June 4	@ Brewers	7–1	Jarvis (2–1)	Haynes (6–4)		17,147	30–23
54	June 5	@ Mariners	6–2	Sele (6–2)	Yoshii (1–7)		25,582	30–24
55	June 6	@ Mariners	4–1	Tomko (4–2)	Bohanon (2–4)	Sasaki (9)	26,812	30–25
56	June 7	@ Mariners	6–1	Arrojo (4–4)	Moyer (3–2)		27,050	31–25
57	June 9	Rangers	3–2 (12)	Tavárez (4–2)	Wetteland (3–2)		44,764e	32–25
58	June 10	Rangers	12–6	Karl (2–2)	Loaiza (3–4)		46,155	33–25
59	June 11	Rangers	9–8	DeJean (1–1)	Crabtree (1–2)	Jiménez (11)	42,802	34–25
60	June 13	Astros	6–3	Reynolds (6–3)	Arrojo (4–5)	Wagner (6)	42,699	34–26
61	June 14	Astros	8–4	Slusarski (1–3)	Astacio (6–3)		42,010	34–27
62	June 15	Astros	5–4	Jiménez (4–0)	Wagner (2–4)		40,743	35–27
63	June 17	Diamondbacks	14–5	Bohanon (3–4)	Anderson (6–2)		48,043	36–27
64	June 18	Diamondbacks	19–2	Yoshii (2–7)	Reynoso (4–6)		48,117	37–27
65	June 20	@ Reds	3–2	Graves (9–1)	Astacio (6–4)		24,060	37–28
66	June 21	@ Reds	6–4	Tavárez (5–2)	Williamson (2–4)	Jiménez (12)	23,580	38–28
67	June 22	@ Reds	5–3	Parris (3–10)	Jarvis (2–2)	Graves (10)	28,531	38–29
68	June 23	@ Diamondbacks	2–0	Anderson (7–2)	Bohanon (3–5)	Kim (10)	37,089	38–30
69	June 24	@ Diamondbacks	4–0	Yoshii (3–7)	Johnson (11–2)		42,559	39–30
70	June 25	@ Diamondbacks	8–3	Morgan (3–1)	Astacio (6–5)		35,887	39–31
71	June 26	Giants	15–6	Arrojo (5–5)	Gardner (4–4)		40,197	40–31
72	June 27	Giants	12–7	Estes (7–3)	Jarvis (2–3)		41,573	40–32
73	June 28	Giants	17–13	DeJean (2–1)	Johnstone (2–4)		43,405	41–32
74	June 29	Giants	11–4	Yoshii (4–7)	Nathan (4–2)		43,946	42–32
75	June 30	@ Padres	5–4	Astacio (7–5)	Almanzar (1–3)	Jiménez (13)	34,811	43–32

July: 7-22 (Home: 4-9; Away: 3-13)

#	Date	Opponent	Score	Win	Loss	Save	Attendance	Record
76	July 1	@ Padres	5–3	Meadows (7–5)	Arrojo (5–6)	Hoffman (21)	34,941	43–33
77	July 2	@ Padres	3–2 (10)	DeJean (3–1)	Hoffman (1–3)	Jiménez (14)	22,873	44–33
78	July 3	@ Padres	3–1	Bohanon (4–5)	Montgomery (0–2)	Jiménez (15)	31,717	45–33
79	July 4	@ Giants	4–1	Hernández (7–6)	Yoshii (4–8)	Nen (14)	40,930	45–34
80	July 4	@ Giants	3–0	Gardner (5–4)	Karl (2–3)	Nen (15)	40,930	45–35
81	July 5	@ Giants	4–2	Nathan (5–2)	Belinda (1–2)	Rodríguez (2)	40,930	45–36
82	July 6	@ Giants	6–5	Nen (3–3)	Myers (0–1)		40,930	45–37
83	July 7	@ Angels	12–4	Ortiz (3–2)	Jarvis (2–4)		29,826	45–38
84	July 8	@ Angels	6–2	Hill (5–5)	Bohanon (4–6)		22,958	45–39
85	July 9	@ Angels	10–4	Bottenfield (5–7)	Yoshii (4–9)		23,820	45–40
86	July 13	Reds	15–6	Dessens (2–0)	Astacio (7–6)		48,735	45–41
87	July 14	Reds	9–2	Harnisch (2–5)	Arrojo (5–7)		48,471	45–42
88	July 15	Reds	7–4	Williamson (3–6)	Yoshii (4–10)	Graves (15)	48,201	45–43
89	July 17	Athletics	11–10	Magnante (1–1)	White (6–1)	Isringhausen (20)	40,120	45–44
90	July 17	Athletics	10–9 (10)	DeJean (4–1)	Isringhausen (4–3)		40,276	46–44
91	July 18	Athletics	18–3	Astacio (8–6)	Mulder (5–6)		38,371	47–44
92	July 19	@ Dodgers	9–1	Brown (9–3)	Arrojo (5–8)		26,889	47–45
93	July 20	@ Dodgers	6–3	Park (10–7)	Yoshii (4–11)	Fetters (4)	33,619	47–46
94	July 21	Padres	5–1	Eaton (2–1)	Bohanon (4–7)		41,118	47–47
95	July 22	Padres	9–4	White (7–1)	Clement (9–9)		46,085	48–47
96	July 23	Padres	6–4 (10)	Hoffman (3–4)	Belinda (1–3)	Wall (1)	40,251	48–48
97	July 24	Dodgers	4–1	Brown (10–3)	Arrojo (5–9)	Fetters (5)	39,425	48–49
98	July 25	Dodgers	6–4	Park (11–7)	Chouinard (0–1)	Shaw (15)	41,220	48–50
99	July 26	Dodgers	11–4	Bohanon (5–7)	Pérez (4–5)		40,301	49–50
100	July 27	Dodgers	16–11	Masaoka (1–0)	Carrara (0–1)		40,724	49–51
101	July 28	@ Brewers	5–0	Wright (6–4)	Astacio (8–7)		21,239	49–52
102	July 29	@ Brewers	10–2	Tavárez (6–2)	Rigdon (1–2)		21,762	50–52
103	July 30	@ Brewers	3–2	D'Amico (7–4)	Yoshii (4–12)	Leskanic (2)	21,071	50–53
104	July 31	@ Cubs	2–0	Tapani (7–8)	Bohanon (5–8)	Aguilera (24)	38,731	50–54

August: 18-11 (Home: 7-5; Away: 11-6)

#	Date	Opponent	Score	Win	Loss	Save	Attendance	Record
105	August 1	@ Cubs	2–1	Astacio (9–7)	Farnsworth (1–6)	White (2)	38,221	51–54
106	August 2	@ Cubs	3–2	Rain (3–0)	Wasdin (1–4)	Aguilera (25)	39,539	51–55
107	August 4	Phillies	8–1	Tavárez (7–2)	Bottenfield (7–9)		42,827	52–55
108	August 5	Phillies	7–6	Jiménez (5–0)	Brantley (1–6)		40,979	53–55
109	August 6	Phillies	10–9	Chen (6–1)	Astacio (9–8)		38,278	53–56
110	August 7	Pirates	8–7	Sauerbeck (4–1)	Jiménez (5–1)	Williams (16)	39,691	53–57
111	August 8	Pirates	6–1	Rose (4–5)	Silva (7–6)		38,535	54–57
112	August 9	Pirates	4–3	White (8–1)	Williams (2–3)		39,328	55–57
113	August 10	@ Cardinals	5–4	Timlin (4–3)	Jiménez (5–2)		44,020	55–58
114	August 11	@ Expos	10–3	Bohanon (6–8)	Hermanson (8–10)		9,136	56–58
115	August 12	@ Expos	14–2	Yoshii (5–12)	Moore (1–2)		9,815	57–58
116	August 13	@ Expos	5–3	Chouinard (1–1)	Strickland (4–2)	White (3)	10,606	58–58
117	August 14	@ Expos	4–3	House (1–0)	Strickland (4–3)	Jiménez (16)	6,924	59–58
118	August 15	@ Mets	7–5	Cook (6–2)	House (1–1)	Benítez (30)		59–59
119	August 15	@ Mets	4–3	Jones (8–5)	Chouinard (1–2)	Benítez (31)	29,744	59–60
120	August 16	@ Mets	7–5	Bohanon (7–8)	Rusch (8–10)	White (4)	29,832	60–60
121	August 17	@ Mets	13–2	Wendell (5–4)	Yoshii (5–13)		42,697	60–61
122	August 18	Marlins	9–8	Smith (2–4)	Rose (4–6)	Alfonseca (35)	40,205	60–62
123	August 19	Marlins	10–3	Tavárez (8–2)	Cornelius (3–6)		40,232	61–62
124	August 20	Marlins	13–4	Astacio (10–8)	Sánchez (8–9)		38,498	62–62
125	August 21	Braves	7–4	Millwood (8–8)	Bohanon (7–9)	Rocker (17)	43,015	62–63
126	August 22	Braves	7–6 (12)	Mayne (1–0)	Rocker (1–1)		41,707	63–63
127	August 23	Braves	5–2	Maddux (14–7)	Rose (4–7)	Remlinger (12)	41,850	63–64
128	August 25	@ Pirates	6–3	Tavárez (9–2)	Anderson (4–7)		23,104	64–64
129	August 26	@ Pirates	11–4	Astacio (11–8)	Silva (8–8)		23,340	65–64
130	August 27	@ Pirates	9–2	Bohanon (8–9)	Serafini (1–3)		20,157	66–64
131	August 28	@ Phillies	3–2	Person (7–4)	Yoshii (5–14)	Brantley (21)	14,118	66–65
132	August 29	@ Phillies	2–1	Rose (5–7)	Daal (3–16)	Jiménez (17)	14,862	67–65
133	August 30	@ Phillies	5–4 (11)	White (9–1)	Gomes (4–6)	Jiménez (18)	14,150	68–65

September: 13-15 (Home: 9-10; Away: 4-5)

#	Date	Opponent	Score	Win	Loss	Save	Attendance	Record
134	September 1	Brewers	5–3	Astacio (12–8)	Snyder (3–7)	White (5)	38,970	69–65
135	September 2	Brewers	8–3	D'Amico (11–5)	DeJean (4–2)		36,139	69–66
136	September 3	Brewers	6–4 (11)	Acevedo (3–5)	DeJean (4–3)	Leskanic (9)	36,576	69–67
137	September 4	Cubs	6–2	Rose (6–7)	Lieber (12–8)		40,277	70–67
138	September 5	Cubs	10–2	Tavárez (10–2)	Arnold (0–2)		39,159	71–67
139	September 6	Cubs	8–5 (11)	Van Poppel (3–4)	White (9–2)	Aguilera (29)	37,509	71–68
140	September 8	Dodgers	8–5	Bohanon (9–9)	Brown (12–6)		37,647	72–68
141	September 9	Dodgers	7–6	White (10–2)	Park (15–9)	Jiménez (19)	37,241	73–68
142	September 10	Dodgers	12–1	Dreifort (11–8)	Astacio (12–9)	Herges (1)	36,273	73–69
143	September 11	@ Padres	7–2	Williams (10–5)	Tavárez (10–3)		19,404	73–70
144	September 12	@ Padres	6–3	Yoshii (6–14)	Clement (12–15)	Jiménez (20)	15,772	74–70
145	September 13	@ Padres	11–0	Bohanon (10–9)	Eaton (5–3)		13,832	75–70
146	September 14	@ Dodgers	5–4	Rose (7–7)	Park (15–10)	Jiménez (21)	24,368	76–70
147	September 15	@ Dodgers	4–3 (10)	Herges (10–3)	DeJean (4–4)		33,009	76–71
148	September 16	@ Dodgers	5–4	Gagné (3–6)	Tavárez (10–4)	Shaw (25)	36,464	76–72
149	September 17	@ Dodgers	12–6	Prokopec (1–0)	Yoshii (6–15)		36,498	76–73
150	September 19	Padres	7–2	Clement (13–15)	Bohanon (10–10)		36,295	76–74
151	September 20	Padres	15–11	Eaton (6–3)	Rose (7–8)	Hoffman (41)	36,088	76–75
152	September 21	Padres	13–4	Jarvis (3–4)	Tollberg (4–4)		36,286	77–75
153	September 22	Marlins	8–4	Penny (7–7)	Tavárez (10–5)		45,529	77–76
154	September 23	Marlins	3–1 (7)	Smith (5–6)	Wasdin (1–5)		36,355	77–77
155	September 24	Marlins	9–3	Bohanon (11–10)	Sánchez (9–12)		35,071	78–77
156	September 25	Diamondbacks	6–4	Johnson (19–6)	Rose (7–9)	Mantei (17)	37,131	78–78
157	September 26	Diamondbacks	7–6	Chouinard (2–2)	Morgan (5–5)	Jiménez (22)	35,703	79–78
158	September 27	Diamondbacks	6–4	White (11–2)	Plesac (5–1)	Jiménez (23)	36,519	80–78
159	September 28	Diamondbacks	12–3	Reynoso (11–12)	Wasdin (1–6)		36,659	80–79
160	September 29	@ Braves	4–2	Bohanon (12–10)	Ashby (12–13)	Jiménez (24)	44,548	81–79
161	September 30	@ Braves	5–2	Glavine (21–9)	Rose (7–10)	Rocker (24)	48,933	81–80

October: 1-0 (Home: 0-0; Away: 1-0)

#	Date	Opponent	Score	Win	Loss	Save	Attendance	Record
162	October 1	@ Braves	10–5	Tavárez (11–5)	Rocker (1–2)		45,794	82–80

== Farm system ==
Level	Team	League	Manager
AAA	Colorado Springs Sky Sox	Pacific Coast League	Chris Cron
AA	Carolina Mudcats	Southern League	Ron Gideon
A	Salem Avalanche	Carolina League	Alan Cockrell
A	Asheville Tourists	South Atlantic League	Joe Mikulik
A-Short Season	Portland Rockies	Northwest League	Billy White
Rookie	AZL Rockies	Arizona League	P. J. Carey

== See also ==
- List of Colorado Rockies team records
- List of Major League Baseball annual doubles leaders
- List of Major League Baseball annual putouts leaders
- List of Major League Baseball annual runs batted in leaders
- List of Major League Baseball batting champions
- List of National League annual slugging percentage leaders
- List of Silver Slugger Award winners at first base

Records
Preceded by 1999	Colorado Rockies seasons 2000	Succeeded by 2001
