= 2000 St. Louis Cardinals season =

Major League Baseball season

2000 St. Louis Cardinals
- National League Central champions
- League: National League
- Division: Central
- Ballpark: Busch Memorial Stadium
- City: St. Louis, Missouri
- Record: 95–67 (.586)
- Divisional place: 1st
- Owners: William DeWitt, Jr.
- General managers: Walt Jocketty
- Managers: Tony La Russa
- Television: Fox Sports Midwest; KPLR (Al Hrabosky, Bob Carpenter, Dan McLaughlin, Joe Buck)
- Radio: KMOX (Jack Buck, Mike Shannon, Joe Buck)

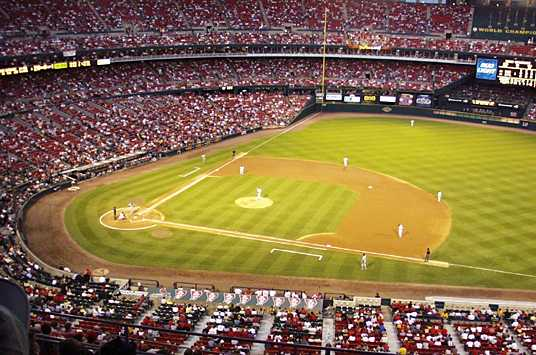
The season's eventual National League Central Division champions St. Louis Cardinals playing host to the Chicago Cubs during a September 2000 game at Busch Memorial Stadium.

The 2000 St. Louis Cardinals season was the team's 119th season in St. Louis, Missouri and the 109th season in the National League. The Cardinals went 95–67 during the season, their best finish since 1987, and won the National League Central by ten games over the Cincinnati Reds. In the playoffs the Cardinals defeated the Atlanta Braves a three-game sweep of the NLDS. They faced the New York Mets in the NLCS and lost in five games.

The Cardinals sweep of the Braves in the NLDS was notable because of the perception by the media that it would make it easier for their opponent in the Mets to reach the World Series. The Braves (the defending National League champion) had eliminated the Mets from the playoffs on the final day of the 1998 season and in the 1999 NLCS.

The 2000 Cardinals featured a completely revamped roster, assembled during a busy offseason following a losing 1999 campaign. Key acquisitions included second baseman Fernando Vina, from the Milwaukee Brewers, catcher Mike Matheny, from the Toronto Blue Jays, and centerfielder Jim Edmonds, from the Anaheim Angels. Matheny and Edmonds won Gold Gloves this year. Pitcher Darryl Kile, from the Colorado Rockies, was one of three new starters in the rotation. He went 20-9 and finished 5th in voting for the NL Cy Young Award.

== Offseason ==
- November 11, 1999: Alberto Castillo, Matt DeWitt, and Lance Painter were traded by the Cardinals to the Toronto Blue Jays for Paul Spoljaric and Pat Hentgen.
- November 16, 1999: Manny Aybar, Brent Butler, Rich Croushore, and José Jiménez were traded by the Cardinals to the Colorado Rockies for Darryl Kile, Luther Hackman and Dave Veres.
- November 24, 1999: Heathcliff Slocumb was signed as a free agent by the Cardinals.
- December 15, 1999: Luis Ordaz was traded by the Cardinals to the Arizona Diamondbacks for Dante Powell.
- December 20, 1999: Juan Acevedo was traded by the Cardinals with two players to be named later to the Milwaukee Brewers for Fernando Vina. In June 2000 the Cardinals sent Eliezer Alfonzo and Matt Parker to the Brewers to complete the trade.
- January 5, 2000: Ernie Young was signed as a free agent by the Cardinals.
- January 7, 2000: Andy Benes was signed as a free agent by the Cardinals.
- March 18, 2000: Joe McEwing was traded by the Cardinals to the New York Mets for Jesse Orosco.
- March 23, 2000: Kent Bottenfield was traded by the Cardinals with Adam Kennedy to the Anaheim Angels for Jim Edmonds.

== Regular season ==
=== Opening Day starters ===
- Eric Davis
- Jim Edmonds
- Darryl Kile
- Ray Lankford
- Mike Matheny
- Craig Paquette
- Édgar Rentería
- Fernando Tatís
- Fernando Viña

=== Season standings ===
NL Central
| Team | W | L | Pct. | GB | Home | Road |
|---|---|---|---|---|---|---|
| St. Louis Cardinals | 95 | 67 | .586 | — | 50‍–‍31 | 45‍–‍36 |
| Cincinnati Reds | 85 | 77 | .525 | 10 | 43‍–‍38 | 42‍–‍39 |
| Milwaukee Brewers | 73 | 89 | .451 | 22 | 42‍–‍39 | 31‍–‍50 |
| Houston Astros | 72 | 90 | .444 | 23 | 39‍–‍42 | 33‍–‍48 |
| Pittsburgh Pirates | 69 | 93 | .426 | 26 | 37‍–‍44 | 32‍–‍49 |
| Chicago Cubs | 65 | 97 | .401 | 30 | 38‍–‍43 | 27‍–‍54 |

=== Record vs. opponents ===
2000 National League record Source: NL Standings Head-to-Head
| Team | AZ | ATL | CHC | CIN | COL | FLA | HOU | LAD | MIL | MON | NYM | PHI | PIT | SD | SF | STL | AL |
|---|---|---|---|---|---|---|---|---|---|---|---|---|---|---|---|---|---|
| Arizona | — | 3–6 | 5–4 | 2–5 | 7–6 | 4–5 | 6–1 | 7–6 | 4–5 | 4–5 | 2–7 | 8–1 | 7–2 | 9–4 | 6–7 | 5–4 | 6–9 |
| Atlanta | 6–3 | — | 4–5 | 2–5 | 5–4 | 6–6 | 5–4 | 7–2 | 6–3 | 6–7 | 7–6 | 8–5 | 5–2 | 8–1 | 6–3 | 3–4 | 11–7 |
| Chicago | 4–5 | 5–4 | — | 4–8 | 4–5 | 1–6 | 5–7 | 3–6 | 6–7 | 4–5 | 2–5 | 6–3 | 3–9 | 3–5 | 4–5 | 3–10 | 8–7 |
| Cincinnati | 5–2 | 5–2 | 8–4 | — | 6–3 | 3–6 | 7–5 | 4–5 | 5–8–1 | 6–3 | 5–4 | 3–4 | 7–6 | 4–5 | 3–6 | 7–6 | 7–8 |
| Colorado | 6–7 | 4–5 | 5–4 | 3–6 | — | 4–5 | 5–4 | 4–9 | 4–5 | 7–2 | 3–6 | 6–3 | 7–2 | 7–6 | 6–7 | 5–3 | 6–6 |
| Florida | 5–4 | 6–6 | 6–1 | 6–3 | 5–4 | — | 3–5 | 2–7 | 3–4 | 7–6 | 6–6 | 9–4 | 5–4 | 2–7 | 3–6 | 3–6 | 8–9 |
| Houston | 1–6 | 4–5 | 7–5 | 5–7 | 4–5 | 5–3 | — | 3–6 | 7–6 | 4–5 | 2–5 | 5–4 | 10–3 | 2–7 | 1–8 | 6–6 | 6–9 |
| Los Angeles | 6–7 | 2–7 | 6–3 | 5–4 | 9–4 | 7–2 | 6–3 | — | 3–4 | 5–3 | 4–5 | 5–4 | 4–5 | 8–5 | 7–5 | 3–6 | 6–9 |
| Milwaukee | 5–4 | 3–6 | 7–6 | 8–5–1 | 5–4 | 4–3 | 6–7 | 4–3 | — | 4–5 | 2–7 | 2–5 | 7–5 | 2–7 | 3–6 | 5–7 | 6–9 |
| Montreal | 5–4 | 7–6 | 5–4 | 3–6 | 2–7 | 6–7 | 5–4 | 3–5 | 5–4 | — | 3–9 | 5–7 | 3–4 | 3–6 | 3–6 | 2–5 | 7–11 |
| New York | 7–2 | 6–7 | 5–2 | 4–5 | 6–3 | 6–6 | 5–2 | 5–4 | 7–2 | 9–3 | — | 6–7 | 7–2 | 3–6 | 3–5 | 6–3 | 9–9 |
| Philadelphia | 1–8 | 5–8 | 3–6 | 4–3 | 3–6 | 4–9 | 4–5 | 4–5 | 5–2 | 7–5 | 7–6 | — | 3–6 | 2–5 | 2–7 | 2–7 | 9–9 |
| Pittsburgh | 2–7 | 2–5 | 9–3 | 6–7 | 2–7 | 4–5 | 3–10 | 5–4 | 5–7 | 4–3 | 2–7 | 6–3 | — | 7–2 | 2–6 | 4–8 | 6–9 |
| San Diego | 4–9 | 1–8 | 5–3 | 5–4 | 6–7 | 7–2 | 7–2 | 5–8 | 7–2 | 6–3 | 6–3 | 5–2 | 2–7 | — | 5–7 | 0–9 | 5–10 |
| San Francisco | 7–6 | 3–6 | 5–4 | 6–3 | 7–6 | 6–3 | 8–1 | 5–7 | 6–3 | 6–3 | 5–3 | 7–2 | 6–2 | 7–5 | — | 5–4 | 8–7 |
| St. Louis | 4–5 | 4–3 | 10–3 | 6–7 | 3–5 | 6–3 | 6–6 | 6–3 | 7–5 | 5–2 | 3–6 | 7–2 | 8–4 | 9–0 | 4–5 | — | 7–8 |

=== Transactions ===
- June 5: Released Mike Mohler.
- July 31: Traded Heathcliff Slocumb and Ben Johnson to the San Diego Padres for Carlos Hernández and Nate Tebbs (minors).
- July 31: Traded José León with cash to the Baltimore Orioles for Will Clark. Acquired to play in place of the injured Mark McGwire, Clark responded with a .964 OPS and hit a home run in each of his first four games with the new club. He performed better in the 2000 playoffs (.345 BA) than in recent years. After announcing that his retirement would come when the Cardinals' playoff run ended, Clark went 1 for 3 in his final game on October 16, 2000, in the NLCS against the New York Mets,

=== Roster ===
2000 St. Louis Cardinals
Roster
| Pitchers: 66 Rick Ankiel; 31 Alan Benes; 40 Andy Benes; 56 Justin Brunette; 41 Jason Christiansen; 63 Luther Hackman; 41 Pat Hentgen; 37 Darren Holmes; 49 Mike James; 57 Darryl Kile; 50 Mike Matthews; 32 Mike Mohler; 35 Matt Morris; 47 Jesse Orosco; 36 Scott Radinsky; 68 Britt Reames; 52 José Rodríguez; 58 Heathcliff Slocumb; 67 Gene Stechschulte; 55 Garrett Stephenson; 46 Mark Thompson; 50 Mike Timlin; 43 Dave Veres; 44 Dave Wainhouse | Catchers: 8 Carlos Hernández; 26 Eli Marrero; 44,22 Mike Matheny; 32 Keith McDonald; 29 Rick Wilkins; Infielders: 28,22 Will Clark; 25 Mark McGwire; 21 Craig Paquette; 33 Eduardo Pérez; 27 Plácido Polanco; 3 Édgar Rentería; 28 Larry Sutton; 23 Fernando Tatís; 4 Fernando Viña | Outfielders: 24 Eric Davis; 7 J. D. Drew; 12 Shawon Dunston; 15 Jim Edmonds; 5 Thomas Howard; 16 Ray Lankford; 8 Chris Richard; 13 Luis Saturria | Manager: 10 Tony La Russa; Coaches: 34 Mark DeJohn (Bench); 18 Dave Duncan (Pitching); 19 Mike Easler (Hitting); 38 Marty Mason (Bullpen); 39 Dave McKay (First Base); 11 José Oquendo (Third Base) |

== Player stats ==
=== Batting ===
==== Starters by position ====
Note: Pos = Position; G = Games played; AB = At bats; H = Hits; Avg. = Batting average; HR = Home runs; RBI = Runs batted in

| Pos | Player | G | AB | H | Avg. | HR | RBI |
|---|---|---|---|---|---|---|---|
| C | Mike Matheny | 128 | 417 | 109 | .261 | 6 | 47 |
| 1B | Mark McGwire | 89 | 236 | 72 | .305 | 32 | 73 |
| 2B | Fernando Viña | 123 | 487 | 146 | .300 | 4 | 31 |
| SS | Édgar Rentería | 150 | 562 | 156 | .278 | 16 | 76 |
| 3B | Fernando Tatís | 96 | 324 | 82 | .253 | 18 | 64 |
| LF | Ray Lankford | 128 | 392 | 99 | .253 | 26 | 65 |
| CF | Jim Edmonds | 152 | 525 | 155 | .295 | 42 | 108 |
| RF | J.D. Drew | 135 | 407 | 120 | .295 | 18 | 57 |

==== Other batters ====
Note: G = Games played; AB = At bats; H = Hits; Avg. = Batting average; HR = Home runs; RBI = Runs batted in

| Player | G | AB | H | Avg. | HR | RBI |
|---|---|---|---|---|---|---|
| Craig Paquette | 134 | 384 | 94 | .245 | 15 | 61 |
| Plácido Polanco | 118 | 323 | 102 | .316 | 5 | 39 |
| Eric Davis | 92 | 254 | 77 | .303 | 6 | 40 |
| Shawon Dunston | 98 | 216 | 54 | .250 | 12 | 43 |
| Will Clark | 51 | 171 | 59 | .345 | 12 | 42 |
| Thomas Howard | 86 | 133 | 28 | .211 | 6 | 28 |
| Eli Marrero | 53 | 102 | 23 | .225 | 5 | 17 |
| Eduardo Pérez | 35 | 91 | 27 | .297 | 3 | 10 |
| Carlos Hernández | 17 | 51 | 14 | .275 | 1 | 10 |
| Larry Sutton | 23 | 25 | 8 | .320 | 1 | 6 |
| Chris Richard | 6 | 16 | 2 | .125 | 1 | 1 |
| Rick Wilkins | 4 | 11 | 3 | .273 | 0 | 1 |
| Keith McDonald | 6 | 7 | 3 | .429 | 3 | 5 |
| Luis Saturria | 6 | 5 | 0 | .000 | 0 | 0 |

=== Pitching ===
==== Starting pitchers ====
Note: G = Games pitched; IP = Innings pitched; W = Wins; L = Losses; ERA = Earned run average; SO = Strikeouts

| Player | G | IP | W | L | ERA | SO |
|---|---|---|---|---|---|---|
| Darryl Kile | 34 | 232.1 | 20 | 9 | 3.91 | 192 |
| Garrett Stephenson | 32 | 200.1 | 16 | 9 | 4.49 | 123 |
| Pat Hentgen | 33 | 194.1 | 15 | 12 | 4.72 | 118 |
| Rick Ankiel | 31 | 175.0 | 11 | 7 | 3.50 | 194 |
| Andy Benes | 30 | 166.0 | 12 | 9 | 4.88 | 137 |
| Britt Reames | 8 | 40.2 | 2 | 1 | 2.88 | 31 |

==== Relief pitchers ====
Note: G = Games pitched; W = Wins; L = Losses; SV = Saves; ERA = Earned run average; SO = Strikeouts

| Player | G | W | L | SV | ERA | SO |
|---|---|---|---|---|---|---|
| Dave Veres | 71 | 3 | 5 | 29 | 2.85 | 67 |
| Mike James | 51 | 2 | 2 | 2 | 3.16 | 41 |
| Heathcliff Slocumb | 43 | 2 | 3 | 1 | 5.44 | 34 |
| Matt Morris | 31 | 3 | 3 | 4 | 3.57 | 34 |
| Alan Benes | 30 | 2 | 2 | 0 | 5.67 | 26 |
| Mike Timlin | 25 | 3 | 1 | 1 | 3.34 | 26 |
| Mike Mohler | 22 | 1 | 1 | 0 | 9.00 | 8 |
| Jason Christiansen | 21 | 1 | 0 | 0 | 5.40 | 12 |
| Gene Stechschulte | 20 | 1 | 0 | 0 | 6.31 | 12 |
| Mark Thompson | 20 | 1 | 1 | 0 | 5.04 | 19 |
| Mike Matthews | 14 | 0 | 0 | 0 | 11.57 | 8 |
| Dave Wainhouse | 9 | 0 | 1 | 0 | 9.35 | 5 |
| José Rodríguez | 6 | 0 | 0 | 0 | 0.00 | 2 |
| Jesse Orosco | 6 | 0 | 0 | 0 | 3.86 | 4 |
| Darren Holmes | 5 | 0 | 1 | 0 | 9.72 | 5 |
| Justin Brunette | 4 | 0 | 0 | 0 | 5.79 | 2 |
| Luther Hackman | 1 | 0 | 0 | 0 | 10.13 | 0 |
| Scott Radinsky | 1 | 0 | 0 | 0 | ---- | 0 |

== NLDS ==
St. Louis won series, 3-0. This was the series in which pitching phenom Rick Ankiel permanently lost his command and control, throwing four wild pitches in one inning.

| Game | Score | Date |
|---|---|---|
| 1 | St. Louis 7, Atlanta 5 | October 3 |
| 2 | St. Louis 10, Atlanta 4 | October 5 |
| 3 | St. Louis 7, Atlanta 1 | October 7 |

== NLCS ==
=== Game 1 ===
October 11: Busch Stadium, St. Louis, Missouri

| Team | 1 | 2 | 3 | 4 | 5 | 6 | 7 | 8 | 9 | R | H | E |
|---|---|---|---|---|---|---|---|---|---|---|---|---|
| New York | 2 | 0 | 0 | 0 | 1 | 0 | 0 | 0 | 3 | 6 | 8 | 3 |
| St. Louis | 0 | 0 | 0 | 0 | 0 | 0 | 0 | 0 | 2 | 2 | 9 | 0 |
WP: Mike Hampton (1-0) LP: Darryl Kile (0-1); Home runs: NYM: Todd Zeile (1), Jay Payton (1); STL: None

=== Game 2 ===
October 12: Busch Stadium, St. Louis, Missouri

| Team | 1 | 2 | 3 | 4 | 5 | 6 | 7 | 8 | 9 | R | H | E |
|---|---|---|---|---|---|---|---|---|---|---|---|---|
| New York | 2 | 0 | 1 | 0 | 0 | 0 | 0 | 2 | 1 | 6 | 9 | 0 |
| St. Louis | 0 | 1 | 0 | 0 | 2 | 0 | 0 | 2 | 0 | 5 | 10 | 3 |
WP: Turk Wendell (1-0) LP: Mike Timlin (0-1) Sv: Armando Benítez (1); Home runs: NYM: Mike Piazza (1); STL: None

=== Game 3 ===
October 14: Shea Stadium, Flushing, New York

| Team | 1 | 2 | 3 | 4 | 5 | 6 | 7 | 8 | 9 | R | H | E |
|---|---|---|---|---|---|---|---|---|---|---|---|---|
| St. Louis | 2 | 0 | 2 | 1 | 3 | 0 | 0 | 0 | 0 | 8 | 14 | 0 |
| New York | 1 | 0 | 0 | 1 | 0 | 0 | 0 | 0 | 0 | 2 | 7 | 1 |
WP: Andy Benes (1-0) LP: Rick Reed (0-1)

=== Game 4 ===
October 15: Shea Stadium, Flushing, New York

| Team | 1 | 2 | 3 | 4 | 5 | 6 | 7 | 8 | 9 | R | H | E |
|---|---|---|---|---|---|---|---|---|---|---|---|---|
| St. Louis | 2 | 0 | 0 | 1 | 3 | 0 | 0 | 0 | 0 | 6 | 11 | 2 |
| New York | 4 | 3 | 0 | 1 | 0 | 2 | 0 | 0 | X | 10 | 9 | 0 |
WP: Glendon Rusch (1-0) LP: Darryl Kile (0-2); Home runs: STL: Jim Edmonds (1); Will Clark (1); NYM: Mike Piazza (2)

=== Game 5 ===
October 16: Shea Stadium, Flushing, New York

| Team | 1 | 2 | 3 | 4 | 5 | 6 | 7 | 8 | 9 | R | H | E |
|---|---|---|---|---|---|---|---|---|---|---|---|---|
| St. Louis | 0 | 0 | 0 | 0 | 0 | 0 | 0 | 0 | 0 | 0 | 3 | 2 |
| New York | 3 | 0 | 0 | 3 | 0 | 0 | 1 | 0 | X | 7 | 10 | 0 |
WP: Mike Hampton (2-0) LP: Pat Hentgen (0-1)

== Farm system ==
| Level | Team | League | Manager |
|---|---|---|---|
| AAA | Memphis Redbirds | Pacific Coast League | Gaylen Pitts |
| AA | Arkansas Travelers | Texas League | Chris Maloney |
| A | Potomac Cannons | Carolina League | Joe Cunningham, Jr. |
| A | Peoria Chiefs | Midwest League | Tom Lawless |
| A-Short Season | New Jersey Cardinals | New York–Penn League | Jeff Shireman |
| Rookie | Johnson City Cardinals | Appalachian League | Luis Meléndez |

LEAGUE CHAMPIONS: Memphis
