= 2000 San Diego Padres season =

2000 San Diego Padres
- League: National League
- Division: West
- Ballpark: Qualcomm Stadium
- City: San Diego, California
- Record: 76–86 (.469)
- Divisional place: 5th
- Owners: John Moores
- General managers: Kevin Towers
- Managers: Bruce Bochy
- Television: KUSI-TV; 4SD (Mark Grant, Mel Proctor, Rick Sutcliffe)
- Radio: KOGO (Jerry Coleman, Ted Leitner, Bob Chandler); KURS (Rene Mora, Juan Avila, Eduardo Ortega)

The 2000 San Diego Padres season was the 32nd season in franchise history.

== Offseason ==
- November 22, 1999: George Williams was signed as a free agent with the San Diego Padres.
- December 22, 1999: Bret Boone was traded by the Atlanta Braves with Ryan Klesko and Jason Shiell to the San Diego Padres for Wally Joyner, Reggie Sanders, and Quilvio Veras.
- February 23, 2000: Al Martin was traded by the Pittsburgh Pirates with cash to the San Diego Padres for John Vander Wal, Geraldo Padua (minors), and James Sak (minors).

== Regular season ==
=== Opening Day starters ===
- Bret Boone
- Wiki González
- Tony Gwynn
- Damian Jackson
- Ryan Klesko
- Al Martin
- Phil Nevin
- Eric Owens
- Woody Williams

=== Season standings ===
NL West
Team	W	L	Pct.	GB	Home	Road
San Francisco Giants	97	65	.599	—	55‍–‍26	42‍–‍39
Los Angeles Dodgers	86	76	.531	11	44‍–‍37	42‍–‍39
Arizona Diamondbacks	85	77	.525	12	47‍–‍34	38‍–‍43
Colorado Rockies	82	80	.506	15	48‍–‍33	34‍–‍47
San Diego Padres	76	86	.469	21	41‍–‍40	35‍–‍46

=== Record vs. opponents ===
2000 National League record Source: NL Standings Head-to-Head
Team	AZ	ATL	CHC	CIN	COL	FLA	HOU	LAD	MIL	MON	NYM	PHI	PIT	SD	SF	STL	AL
Arizona	—	3–6	5–4	2–5	7–6	4–5	6–1	7–6	4–5	4–5	2–7	8–1	7–2	9–4	6–7	5–4	6–9
Atlanta	6–3	—	4–5	2–5	5–4	6–6	5–4	7–2	6–3	6–7	7–6	8–5	5–2	8–1	6–3	3–4	11–7
Chicago	4–5	5–4	—	4–8	4–5	1–6	5–7	3–6	6–7	4–5	2–5	6–3	3–9	3–5	4–5	3–10	8–7
Cincinnati	5–2	5–2	8–4	—	6–3	3–6	7–5	4–5	5–8–1	6–3	5–4	3–4	7–6	4–5	3–6	7–6	7–8
Colorado	6–7	4–5	5–4	3–6	—	4–5	5–4	4–9	4–5	7–2	3–6	6–3	7–2	7–6	6–7	5–3	6–6
Florida	5–4	6–6	6–1	6–3	5–4	—	3–5	2–7	3–4	7–6	6–6	9–4	5–4	2–7	3–6	3–6	8–9
Houston	1–6	4–5	7–5	5–7	4–5	5–3	—	3–6	7–6	4–5	2–5	5–4	10–3	2–7	1–8	6–6	6–9
Los Angeles	6–7	2–7	6–3	5–4	9–4	7–2	6–3	—	3–4	5–3	4–5	5–4	4–5	8–5	7–5	3–6	6–9
Milwaukee	5–4	3–6	7–6	8–5–1	5–4	4–3	6–7	4–3	—	4–5	2–7	2–5	7–5	2–7	3–6	5–7	6–9
Montreal	5–4	7–6	5–4	3–6	2–7	6–7	5–4	3–5	5–4	—	3–9	5–7	3–4	3–6	3–6	2–5	7–11
New York	7–2	6–7	5–2	4–5	6–3	6–6	5–2	5–4	7–2	9–3	—	6–7	7–2	3–6	3–5	6–3	9–9
Philadelphia	1–8	5–8	3–6	4–3	3–6	4–9	4–5	4–5	5–2	7–5	7–6	—	3–6	2–5	2–7	2–7	9–9
Pittsburgh	2–7	2–5	9–3	6–7	2–7	4–5	3–10	5–4	5–7	4–3	2–7	6–3	—	7–2	2–6	4–8	6–9
San Diego	4–9	1–8	5–3	5–4	6–7	7–2	7–2	5–8	7–2	6–3	6–3	5–2	2–7	—	5–7	0–9	5–10
San Francisco	7–6	3–6	5–4	6–3	7–6	6–3	8–1	5–7	6–3	6–3	5–3	7–2	6–2	7–5	—	5–4	8–7
St. Louis	4–5	4–3	10–3	6–7	3–5	6–3	6–6	6–3	7–5	5–2	3–6	7–2	8–4	9–0	4–5	—	7–8

=== Notable transactions ===
- June 5, 2000: Xavier Nady was drafted by the San Diego Padres in the 2nd round of the 2000 Major League Baseball draft. Player signed September 17, 2000.
- July 31, 2000: Heathcliff Slocumb was traded by the St. Louis Cardinals with Ben Johnson to the San Diego Padres for Carlos Hernández and Nate Tebbs (minors).
- July 31, 2000: John Mabry was traded by the Seattle Mariners with Tom Davey to the San Diego Padres for Al Martin.

=== Roster ===
2000 San Diego Padres
Roster
Pitchers: 40 Carlos Almanzar; 37 Brian Boehringer; 58,59 Buddy Carlyle; 21 Matt Clement; 33 Will Cunnane; 44 Tom Davey; 53 Adam Eaton; 57 Todd Erdos; 43 Domingo Guzmán; 41 Sterling Hitchcock; 51 Trevor Hoffman; 47 Brandon Kolb; 44 Rodrigo López; 54 Dave Maurer; 34 Brian Meadows; 27 Steve Montgomery; 66 Rodney Myers; 57 Vicente Palacios; 39 Carlos Reyes; 55 Dan Serafini; 58 Heathcliff Slocumb; 32 Stan Spencer; 55 Brian Tollberg; 56 Kevin Walker; 36 Donne Wall; 50 Matt Whisenant; 49 Matt Whiteside; 18 Woody Williams; 34 Jay Witasick	Catchers: 13 Ben Davis; 7 Wiki González; 59 Carlos Hernández; 39 George Williams; Infielders: 21 Dusty Allen; 9 Gabe Alvarez; 29 Bret Boone; 10 Chris Gomez; 2 Damian Jackson; 30 Ryan Klesko; 20 Greg LaRocca; 12 Dave Magadan; 23 Phil Nevin; 14 David Newhan; 16 Kevin Nicholson; 14 Desi Relaford; 4 Ed Sprague Jr.; 24 Joe Vitiello	Outfielders: 26 Mike Darr; 25 Kory DeHaan; 19 Tony Gwynn; 17 John Mabry; 20 Al Martin; 8 Eric Owens; 28 Rubén Rivera; 22 John Roskos; Other batters: 22 Xavier Nady	Manager: 15 Bruce Bochy; Coaches: 38 Greg Booker (bullpen); 11 Tim Flannery (third base); 24 Ben Oglivie (hitting); 5 Rob Picciolo (bench); 45 Dave Smith (pitching); 3 Alan Trammell (first base)

== Player stats ==
=== Batting ===
==== Starters by position ====
Note: Pos = Position; G = Games played; AB = At bats; H = Hits; Avg. = Batting average; HR = Home runs; RBI = Runs batted in

Pos	Player	G	AB	H	Avg.	HR	RBI
C	Wiki Gonzalez	95	284	66	.232	5	30
1B	Ryan Klesko	145	494	140	.283	26	92
2B	Bret Boone	127	463	116	.251	19	74
SS	Damian Jackson	138	470	120	.255	6	37
3B	Phil Nevin	143	538	163	.303	31	107
LF	Al Martin	93	346	106	.306	11	27
CF	Rubén Rivera	135	423	88	.208	17	57
RF	Eric Owens	145	583	171	.293	6	51

==== Other batters ====
Note: G = Games played; AB = At bats; H = Hits; Avg. = Batting average; HR = Home runs; RBI = Runs batted in

Player	G	AB	H	Avg.	HR	RBI
Mike Darr	58	205	55	.268	1	30
Carlos Hernández	58	191	48	.251	2	25
Desi Relaford	45	157	32	.204	2	16
Ed Sprague Jr.	73	157	41	.261	10	27
Dave Magadan	95	132	36	.273	2	21
Ben Davis	43	130	29	.223	3	14
Tony Gwynn	36	127	41	.323	1	17
John Mabry	48	123	28	.228	7	25
Kory DeHaan	90	103	21	.204	2	13
Kevin Nicholson	37	97	21	.216	1	8
Chris Gomez	33	54	12	.222	0	3
Joe Vitiello	39	52	13	.250	2	8
John Roskos	14	27	1	.037	0	1
Greg LaRocca	13	27	6	.222	0	2
David Newhan	14	20	3	.150	1	2
George Williams	11	16	3	.188	1	2
Gabe Alvarez	11	13	2	.154	0	0
Dusty Allen	9	12	0	.000	0	0
Xavier Nady	1	1	1	1.000	0	0

=== Pitching ===
==== Starting pitchers ====
Note: G = Games pitched; IP = Innings pitched; W = Wins; L = Losses; ERA = Earned run average; SO = Strikeouts

Player	G	IP	W	L	ERA	SO
Matt Clement	34	205.0	13	17	5.14	170
Woody Williams	23	168.0	10	8	3.75	111
Adam Eaton	22	135.0	7	4	4.13	90
Brian Meadows	22	124.2	7	8	5.34	53
Brian Tollberg	19	118.0	4	5	3.58	76
Sterling Hitchcock	11	65.2	1	6	4.93	61
Jay Witasick	11	60.2	3	2	5.64	54
Stan Spencer	8	49.2	2	2	3.26	40
Rodrigo López	6	24.2	0	3	8.76	17

==== Other pitchers ====
Note: G = Games pitched; IP = Innings pitched; W = Wins; L = Losses; ERA = Earned run average; SO = Strikeouts

Player	G	IP	W	L	ERA	SO
Brian Boehringer	7	15.2	0	3	5.74	9

==== Relief pitchers ====
Note: G = Games pitched; W = Wins; L = Losses; SV = Saves; ERA = Earned run average; SO = Strikeouts

Player	G	W	L	SV	ERA	SO
Trevor Hoffman	70	4	7	43	2.99	85
Kevin Walker	70	7	1	0	4.19	56
Carlos Almanzar	62	4	5	0	4.39	56
Donne Wall	44	5	2	1	3.35	29
Matt Whiteside	28	2	3	0	4.14	27
Will Cunnane	27	1	1	0	4.23	34
Matt Whisenant	24	2	2	0	3.80	12
Todd Erdos	22	0	0	1	6.67	16
Heathcliff Slocumb	22	0	1	0	3.79	12
Dave Maurer	14	1	0	0	3.68	13
Carlos Reyes	12	1	1	1	6.00	13
Brandon Kolb	11	0	1	0	4.50	12
Tom Davey	11	2	1	0	0.71	6
Vicente Palacios	7	0	1	0	6.75	8
Steve Montgomery	7	0	2	0	7.94	3
Buddy Carlyle	4	0	0	0	21.00	2
Dan Serafini	3	0	0	0	18.00	3
Rodney Myers	3	0	0	0	4.50	3
Domingo Guzmán	1	0	0	0	9.00	0

== Award winners ==
2000 Major League Baseball All-Star Game

- Trevor Hoffman

== Farm system ==
Level	Team	League	Manager
AAA	Las Vegas Stars	Pacific Coast League	Duane Espy and Tony Franklin
AA	Mobile BayBears	Southern League	Mike Basso
A	Rancho Cucamonga Quakes	California League	Tom LeVasseur
A	Fort Wayne Wizards	Midwest League	Craig Colbert
Rookie	AZL Padres	Arizona League	Howard Bushong
Rookie	Idaho Falls Padres	Pioneer League	Don Werner

LEAGUE CHAMPIONS; Idaho Falls
