= 2000 Cincinnati Reds season =

2000 Cincinnati Reds
- League: National League
- Division: Central
- Ballpark: Cinergy Field
- City: Cincinnati
- Record: 85–77 (52.5%)
- Divisional place: 2nd
- Owners: Carl Lindner
- General managers: Jim Bowden
- Managers: Jack McKeon
- Television: FSN Ohio (George Grande, Chris Welsh)
- Radio: WLW (Marty Brennaman, Joe Nuxhall)
- Stats: ESPN.com; Baseball Reference

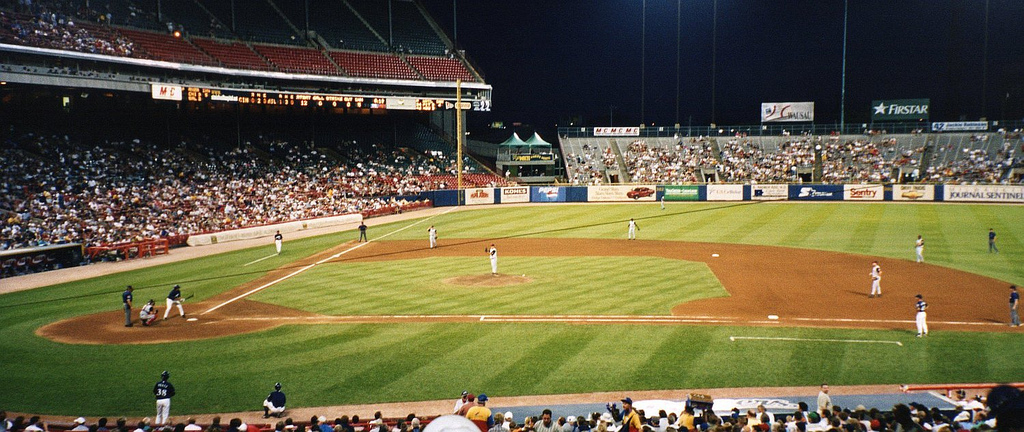
The Reds playing against the Milwaukee Brewers during an August 2000 away game at Milwaukee County Stadium.

The 2000 Cincinnati Reds season was the 131st season for the franchise in Major League Baseball. It consisted of the Cincinnati Reds attempting to win the National League Central, although coming short in second place. They had a record of 85 wins and 77 losses. The Reds became only the second team in the modern era of baseball not be shut out for an entire season, joining the 1932 New York Yankees. The 2020 Los Angeles Dodgers later accomplished this feat, but their season was shortened to 60 games due to the COVID-19 pandemic.

The Reds were managed by Jack McKeon. This was also future Hall of Famer Ken Griffey Jr's first season with the Reds, as he was traded to his long-time father's team from Seattle before the start of the season.

== Offseason ==
- October 30, 1999: Stan Belinda and Jeffrey Hammonds were traded by the Reds to the Colorado Rockies for Dante Bichette and cash.
- November 16, 1999: Brooks Kieschnick was signed as a free agent by the Reds.
- December 13, 1999: DeWayne Wise was drafted by the Toronto Blue Jays from the Cincinnati Reds in the 1999 rule 5 draft.
- December 15, 1999: Elmer Dessens was signed as a free agent by the Reds.
- January 14, 2000: Mark Sweeney and a player to be named later were traded by the Reds to the Milwaukee Brewers for Alex Ochoa. The Reds completed the deal by sending Gene Altman (minors) to the Brewers on May 15.
- February 10, 2000: Mike Cameron, Brett Tomko, Antonio Pérez, and Jake Meyer (minors) were traded by the Reds to the Seattle Mariners for Ken Griffey Jr.

== Regular season ==
=== Season standings ===
NL Central
Team	W	L	Pct.	GB	Home	Road
St. Louis Cardinals	95	67	.586	—	50‍–‍31	45‍–‍36
Cincinnati Reds	85	77	.525	10	43‍–‍38	42‍–‍39
Milwaukee Brewers	73	89	.451	22	42‍–‍39	31‍–‍50
Houston Astros	72	90	.444	23	39‍–‍42	33‍–‍48
Pittsburgh Pirates	69	93	.426	26	37‍–‍44	32‍–‍49
Chicago Cubs	65	97	.401	30	38‍–‍43	27‍–‍54

=== Record vs. opponents ===
2000 National League record Source: NL Standings Head-to-Head
Team	AZ	ATL	CHC	CIN	COL	FLA	HOU	LAD	MIL	MON	NYM	PHI	PIT	SD	SF	STL	AL
Arizona	—	3–6	5–4	2–5	7–6	4–5	6–1	7–6	4–5	4–5	2–7	8–1	7–2	9–4	6–7	5–4	6–9
Atlanta	6–3	—	4–5	2–5	5–4	6–6	5–4	7–2	6–3	6–7	7–6	8–5	5–2	8–1	6–3	3–4	11–7
Chicago	4–5	5–4	—	4–8	4–5	1–6	5–7	3–6	6–7	4–5	2–5	6–3	3–9	3–5	4–5	3–10	8–7
Cincinnati	5–2	5–2	8–4	—	6–3	3–6	7–5	4–5	5–8–1	6–3	5–4	3–4	7–6	4–5	3–6	7–6	7–8
Colorado	6–7	4–5	5–4	3–6	—	4–5	5–4	4–9	4–5	7–2	3–6	6–3	7–2	7–6	6–7	5–3	6–6
Florida	5–4	6–6	6–1	6–3	5–4	—	3–5	2–7	3–4	7–6	6–6	9–4	5–4	2–7	3–6	3–6	8–9
Houston	1–6	4–5	7–5	5–7	4–5	5–3	—	3–6	7–6	4–5	2–5	5–4	10–3	2–7	1–8	6–6	6–9
Los Angeles	6–7	2–7	6–3	5–4	9–4	7–2	6–3	—	3–4	5–3	4–5	5–4	4–5	8–5	7–5	3–6	6–9
Milwaukee	5–4	3–6	7–6	8–5–1	5–4	4–3	6–7	4–3	—	4–5	2–7	2–5	7–5	2–7	3–6	5–7	6–9
Montreal	5–4	7–6	5–4	3–6	2–7	6–7	5–4	3–5	5–4	—	3–9	5–7	3–4	3–6	3–6	2–5	7–11
New York	7–2	6–7	5–2	4–5	6–3	6–6	5–2	5–4	7–2	9–3	—	6–7	7–2	3–6	3–5	6–3	9–9
Philadelphia	1–8	5–8	3–6	4–3	3–6	4–9	4–5	4–5	5–2	7–5	7–6	—	3–6	2–5	2–7	2–7	9–9
Pittsburgh	2–7	2–5	9–3	6–7	2–7	4–5	3–10	5–4	5–7	4–3	2–7	6–3	—	7–2	2–6	4–8	6–9
San Diego	4–9	1–8	5–3	5–4	6–7	7–2	7–2	5–8	7–2	6–3	6–3	5–2	2–7	—	5–7	0–9	5–10
San Francisco	7–6	3–6	5–4	6–3	7–6	6–3	8–1	5–7	6–3	6–3	5–3	7–2	6–2	7–5	—	5–4	8–7
St. Louis	4–5	4–3	10–3	6–7	3–5	6–3	6–6	6–3	7–5	5–2	3–6	7–2	8–4	9–0	4–5	—	7–8

=== Notable transactions ===
- July 12, 2000: Denny Neagle and Mike Frank were traded by the Reds to the New York Yankees for Ed Yarnall, Drew Henson, Brian Reith, and Jackson Melián.
- August 31, 2000: Dante Bichette was traded by the Reds to the Boston Red Sox for Chris Reitsma and John Curtice (minors).

=== Roster ===
2000 Cincinnati Reds
Roster
Pitchers: 36 Manny Aybar; 50 Rob Bell; 37 Norm Charlton; 45 Elmer Dessens; 43 Osvaldo Fernández; 59 Keith Glauber; 32 Danny Graves; 38 Pete Harnisch; 52 Andy Larkin; 53 Larry Luebbers; 52 Héctor Mercado; 15 Denny Neagle; 58 Steve Parris; 49 Dennys Reyes; 52 John Riedling; 56 Scott Sullivan; 41 Ron Villone; 36 Gabe White; 48 Scott Williamson; 51 Scott Winchester; 51 Mark Wohlers	Catchers: 23 Jason LaRue; 6 Benito Santiago; 10 Eddie Taubensee; Infielders: 28 Mike Bell; 17 Aaron Boone; 21 Sean Casey; 12 Juan Castro; 69 D. T. Cromer; 6 Gookie Dawkins; 46 Brooks Kieschnick; 11 Barry Larkin; 28 Mark Lewis; 9 Hal Morris; 3 Pokey Reese; 26 Chris Sexton; 12 Chris Stynes	Outfielders: 26 Kimera Bartee; 9 Dante Bichette; 22 Brady Clark; 30 Ken Griffey Jr.; 44 Brian Hunter; 7 Alex Ochoa; 34 Michael Tucker; 25 Dmitri Young	Manager: 31 Jack McKeon; Coaches: 55 Mark Berry (bullpen catcher); 2 Harry Dunlop (assistant); 30 Ken Griffey, Sr. (hitting); 35 Don Gullett (pitching); 47 Tom Hume (bullpen); 19 Denis Menke (bench); 16 Ron Oester (third base); 22 Dave Collins (first base)

== Player stats ==
=== Batting ===
==== Starters by position ====
Note: Pos = Position; G = Games played; AB = At bats; H = Hits; Avg. = Batting average; HR = Home runs; RBI = Runs batted in

Pos	Player	G	AB	H	Avg.	HR	RBI
C	Benito Santiago	89	252	66	.262	8	45
1B	Sean Casey	133	480	151	.315	20	85
2B	Pokey Reese	135	518	132	.255	12	46
3B	Aaron Boone	84	291	83	.285	12	43
SS	Barry Larkin	102	396	124	.313	11	41
LF	Dmitri Young	152	548	166	.303	18	88
CF	Ken Griffey Jr.	145	520	141	.271	40	118
RF	Dante Bichette	125	461	136	.295	16	76

==== Other batters ====
Note: Pos = Position; G = Games played; AB = At bats; H = Hits; Avg. = Batting average; HR = Home runs; RBI = Runs batted in

Pos	Player	G	AB	H	Avg.	HR	RBI
UT	Chris Stynes	119	380	127	.334	12	40
OF	Michael Tucker	148	270	72	.267	15	36
C	Ed Taubensee	81	266	71	.267	6	24
OF	Alex Ochoa	118	244	77	.316	13	58
IF	Juan Castro	82	224	54	.241	4	23
IF	Chris Sexton	35	100	21	.210	0	10
C	Jason LaRue	31	98	23	.235	5	12
1B	Hal Morris	59	63	14	.222	2	6
1B	D.T. Cromer	35	47	16	.340	2	8
SS	Travis Dawkins	14	41	9	.220	0	3
OF	Brian Hunter	32	40	9	.225	0	1
3B	Mike Bell	19	27	6	.222	2	4
3B	Mark Lewis	11	19	2	.105	0	3
1B	Brooks Kieschnick	14	12	0	.000	0	0
OF	Brady Clark	11	11	3	.273	0	2
OF	Kimera Bartee	11	4	0	.000	0	0

=== Pitching ===
==== Starting pitchers ====
Note: G = Games pitched; GS = Games started; IP = Innings pitched; W= Wins; L = Losses; K = Strikeouts; ERA = Earned run average; WHIP = Walks + Hits Per Inning Pitched

Player	G	GS	IP	W	L	K	ERA	WHIP
Steve Parris	33	33	192.2	12	17	117	4.81	1.547
Ron Villone	35	23	141.0	10	10	77	5.43	1.645
Rob Bell	26	26	140.1	7	8	112	5.00	1.447
Pete Harnisch	22	22	131.0	8	6	71	4.74	1.366
Denny Neagle	18	18	117.2	8	2	88	3.52	1.368
Osvaldo Fernández	15	14	79.2	4	3	36	3.62	1.255

==== Other pitchers ====
Note: G = Games pitched; IP = Innings pitched; W = Wins; L = Losses; ERA = Earned run average; SO = Strikeouts

Player	G	IP	W	L	ERA	SO
Elmer Dessens	40	147.1	11	5	4.28	85
Scott Williamson	48	112.0	5	8	3.29	136

==== Relief pitchers ====
Note: G = Games pitched; W = Wins; L = Losses; SV = Saves; ERA = Earned run average; SO = Strikeouts

Player	G	W	L	SV	ERA	SO
Danny Graves	66	10	5	30	2.56	53
Scott Sullivan	79	3	6	3	3.47	96
Dennys Reyes	62	2	1	0	4.53	36
Manny Aybar	32	1	1	0	4.83	31
Mark Wohlers	20	1	2	0	4.50	20
Larry Luebbers	14	0	2	1	6.20	9
John Riedling	13	3	1	1	2.35	18
Héctor Mercado	12	0	0	0	4.50	13
Scott Winchester	5	0	0	0	3.68	3
Keith Glauber	4	0	0	0	3.68	4
Andy Larkin	3	0	0	0	5.40	7
Norm Charlton	2	0	0	0	27.00	1
Gabe White	1	0	0	0	18.00	2

== Farm system ==
Level	Team	League	Manager
AAA	Louisville RiverBats	International League	Dave Miley
AA	Chattanooga Lookouts	Southern League	Mike Rojas
A	Clinton LumberKings	Midwest League	Jay Sorg
A	Dayton Dragons	Midwest League	Freddie Benavides
Rookie	GCL Reds	Gulf Coast League	Luis Quiñones
Rookie	Billings Mustangs	Pioneer League	Russ Nixon
