= 2000 San Francisco Giants season =

2000 San Francisco Giants
- National League West champions
- League: National League
- Division: West
- Ballpark: Pacific Bell Park
- City: San Francisco, California
- Record: 97–65 (.599)
- Divisional place: 1st
- Owners: Peter Magowan
- General managers: Brian Sabean
- Managers: Dusty Baker
- Television: KTVU (Mike Krukow, Ted Robinson, Jon Miller); FSN Bay Area (Mike Krukow, Duane Kuiper, Lon Simmons)
- Radio: KNBR (Mike Krukow, Lon Simmons, Ted Robinson, Jon Miller, Duane Kuiper); KZSF (Erwin Higueros, Amaury Pi-Gonzalez)

The 2000 San Francisco Giants season was the Giants' 118th season in Major League Baseball and their 43rd season in San Francisco since their move from New York following the 1957 season. The Giants finished in first place in the National League West with a record of 97 wins and 65 losses, which was the best record in the major leagues in 2000. They lost the NLDS in four games to the New York Mets. The team played their first season in newly opened Pacific Bell Park. The Giants had 889 runs batted in (RBI), the most in franchise history, while their 925 runs scored is the most in the club's San Francisco era.

== Offseason ==
- December 12, 1999: Bobby Estalella was traded by the Philadelphia Phillies to the San Francisco Giants for Chris Brock.

== Regular season ==
=== Season standings ===
NL West
| Team | W | L | Pct. | GB | Home | Road |
|---|---|---|---|---|---|---|
| San Francisco Giants | 97 | 65 | .599 | — | 55‍–‍26 | 42‍–‍39 |
| Los Angeles Dodgers | 86 | 76 | .531 | 11 | 44‍–‍37 | 42‍–‍39 |
| Arizona Diamondbacks | 85 | 77 | .525 | 12 | 47‍–‍34 | 38‍–‍43 |
| Colorado Rockies | 82 | 80 | .506 | 15 | 48‍–‍33 | 34‍–‍47 |
| San Diego Padres | 76 | 86 | .469 | 21 | 41‍–‍40 | 35‍–‍46 |

=== Record vs. opponents ===
2000 National League record Source: NL Standings Head-to-Head
| Team | AZ | ATL | CHC | CIN | COL | FLA | HOU | LAD | MIL | MON | NYM | PHI | PIT | SD | SF | STL | AL |
|---|---|---|---|---|---|---|---|---|---|---|---|---|---|---|---|---|---|
| Arizona | — | 3–6 | 5–4 | 2–5 | 7–6 | 4–5 | 6–1 | 7–6 | 4–5 | 4–5 | 2–7 | 8–1 | 7–2 | 9–4 | 6–7 | 5–4 | 6–9 |
| Atlanta | 6–3 | — | 4–5 | 2–5 | 5–4 | 6–6 | 5–4 | 7–2 | 6–3 | 6–7 | 7–6 | 8–5 | 5–2 | 8–1 | 6–3 | 3–4 | 11–7 |
| Chicago | 4–5 | 5–4 | — | 4–8 | 4–5 | 1–6 | 5–7 | 3–6 | 6–7 | 4–5 | 2–5 | 6–3 | 3–9 | 3–5 | 4–5 | 3–10 | 8–7 |
| Cincinnati | 5–2 | 5–2 | 8–4 | — | 6–3 | 3–6 | 7–5 | 4–5 | 5–8–1 | 6–3 | 5–4 | 3–4 | 7–6 | 4–5 | 3–6 | 7–6 | 7–8 |
| Colorado | 6–7 | 4–5 | 5–4 | 3–6 | — | 4–5 | 5–4 | 4–9 | 4–5 | 7–2 | 3–6 | 6–3 | 7–2 | 7–6 | 6–7 | 5–3 | 6–6 |
| Florida | 5–4 | 6–6 | 6–1 | 6–3 | 5–4 | — | 3–5 | 2–7 | 3–4 | 7–6 | 6–6 | 9–4 | 5–4 | 2–7 | 3–6 | 3–6 | 8–9 |
| Houston | 1–6 | 4–5 | 7–5 | 5–7 | 4–5 | 5–3 | — | 3–6 | 7–6 | 4–5 | 2–5 | 5–4 | 10–3 | 2–7 | 1–8 | 6–6 | 6–9 |
| Los Angeles | 6–7 | 2–7 | 6–3 | 5–4 | 9–4 | 7–2 | 6–3 | — | 3–4 | 5–3 | 4–5 | 5–4 | 4–5 | 8–5 | 7–5 | 3–6 | 6–9 |
| Milwaukee | 5–4 | 3–6 | 7–6 | 8–5–1 | 5–4 | 4–3 | 6–7 | 4–3 | — | 4–5 | 2–7 | 2–5 | 7–5 | 2–7 | 3–6 | 5–7 | 6–9 |
| Montreal | 5–4 | 7–6 | 5–4 | 3–6 | 2–7 | 6–7 | 5–4 | 3–5 | 5–4 | — | 3–9 | 5–7 | 3–4 | 3–6 | 3–6 | 2–5 | 7–11 |
| New York | 7–2 | 6–7 | 5–2 | 4–5 | 6–3 | 6–6 | 5–2 | 5–4 | 7–2 | 9–3 | — | 6–7 | 7–2 | 3–6 | 3–5 | 6–3 | 9–9 |
| Philadelphia | 1–8 | 5–8 | 3–6 | 4–3 | 3–6 | 4–9 | 4–5 | 4–5 | 5–2 | 7–5 | 7–6 | — | 3–6 | 2–5 | 2–7 | 2–7 | 9–9 |
| Pittsburgh | 2–7 | 2–5 | 9–3 | 6–7 | 2–7 | 4–5 | 3–10 | 5–4 | 5–7 | 4–3 | 2–7 | 6–3 | — | 7–2 | 2–6 | 4–8 | 6–9 |
| San Diego | 4–9 | 1–8 | 5–3 | 5–4 | 6–7 | 7–2 | 7–2 | 5–8 | 7–2 | 6–3 | 6–3 | 5–2 | 2–7 | — | 5–7 | 0–9 | 5–10 |
| San Francisco | 7–6 | 3–6 | 5–4 | 6–3 | 7–6 | 6–3 | 8–1 | 5–7 | 6–3 | 6–3 | 5–3 | 7–2 | 6–2 | 7–5 | — | 5–4 | 8–7 |
| St. Louis | 4–5 | 4–3 | 10–3 | 6–7 | 3–5 | 6–3 | 6–6 | 6–3 | 7–5 | 5–2 | 3–6 | 7–2 | 8–4 | 9–0 | 4–5 | — | 7–8 |

=== Transactions ===
- June 5, 2000: Boof Bonser was drafted by the San Francisco Giants in the 1st round (21st pick) of the 2000 amateur draft. Player signed July 3, 2000.
- July 3, 2000: Jalal Leach was signed as a free agent with the San Francisco Giants.

=== Roster ===
2000 San Francisco Giants
Roster
| Pitchers: 37 Miguel del Toro; 56 Alan Embree; 55 Shawn Estes; 38 Aaron Fultz; 26 Mark Gardner; 57 Doug Henry; 61 Liván Hernández; 49 John Johnstone; 28 Scott Linebrink; 36 Joe Nathan; 31 Robb Nen; 48 Russ Ortiz; 47 Félix Rodríguez; 46 Kirk Rueter; 51 Ryan Vogelsong; 60 Ben Weber; 41 Chad Zerbe | Catchers: 29 Bobby Estalella; 33 Doug Mirabelli; 9 Scott Servais; Infielders: 35 Rich Aurilia; 18 Russ Davis; 53 Pedro Feliz; 21 Jeff Kent; 34 Ramón Martínez; 28 Juan Melo; 22 Damon Minor; 32 Bill Mueller; 6 J. T. Snow | Outfielders: 7 Marvin Benard; 25 Barry Bonds; 23 Ellis Burks; 52,57 Felipe Crespo; 14 Terrell Lowery; 8 Calvin Murray; 1 Armando Ríos | Manager: 12 Dusty Baker; Coaches: 20 Gene Clines (hitting); 15 Sonny Jackson (third base); 59 Juan Lopez (bullpen); 19 Dave Righetti (pitching); 5 Robby Thompson (first base); 10 Ron Wotus (bench) |

=== Pacific Bell Park ===
- The opening series took place from April 11–13, 2000 against the Los Angeles Dodgers (the same team the Giants faced in their final series at Candlestick Park), and the Giants were swept in three games. In the first game of that series, the Giants lost 6–5, highlighted by three home runs from the Dodgers' Kevin Elster.

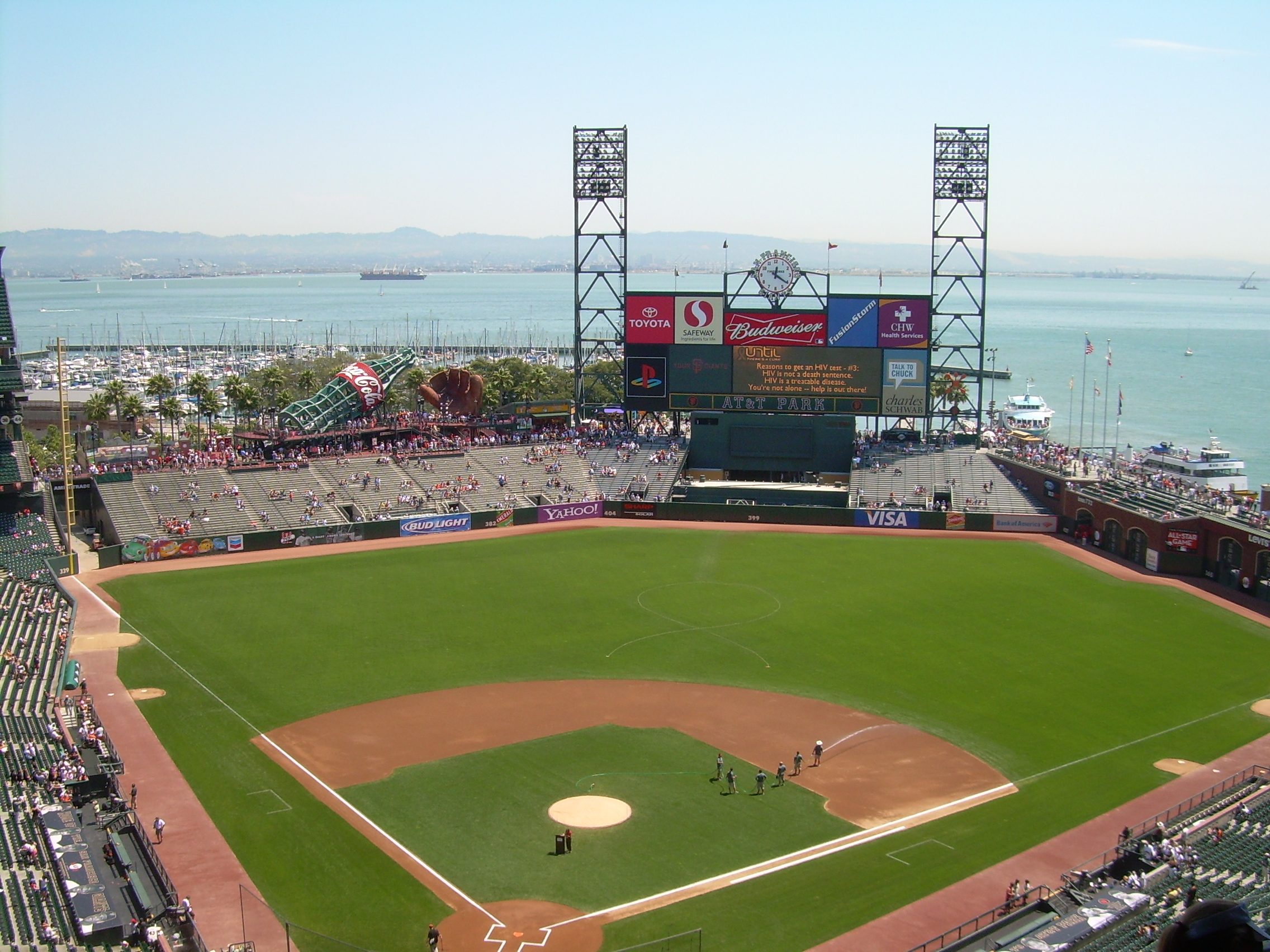
AT&T Park

- The most prominent feature of the ballpark is the right field wall, which is 24 feet (7.3 m) high in honor of former Giant Willie Mays, who wore number 24. Because of the proximity to the San Francisco Bay, the right field foul pole is only 309 feet (94.2 m) from home plate. The wall is made of brick, with fenced off archways opening to the Cove beyond, above which are several rows of arcade seating. The fence angles quickly away from home plate; right-center field extends out to 421 feet (128 m) from home plate. Atop the fence are four pillars with fountains atop. These four pillars will burst jets of water when a Giant hits a home run.

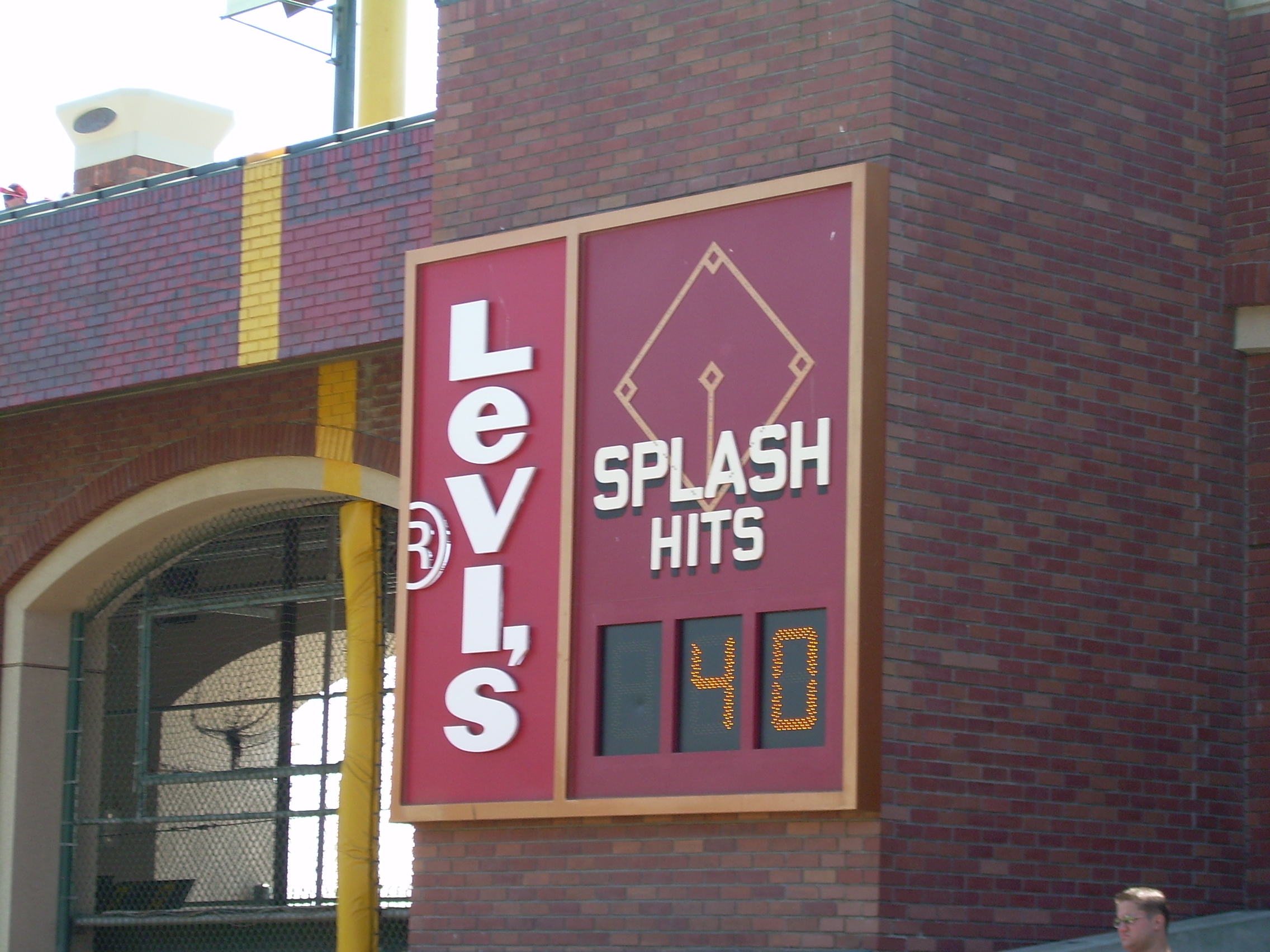
The "Splash Hit" counter on the right field wall

- Lining the foul portion of the wall are rubber chickens, which are put up by fans whenever a Giants player (especially Barry Bonds) is intentionally walked. The fans do this to show that the opposing team is "chicken" for not pitching right to the Giants players. To some old-timers, the right field area vaguely suggests the layout at the Polo Grounds. This deep corner of the ballpark has been dubbed "death valley" and "triples alley." Like its Polo Grounds counterpart, it is very difficult to hit a home run to this area, and a batted ball that finds its way into this corner often results in a triple.

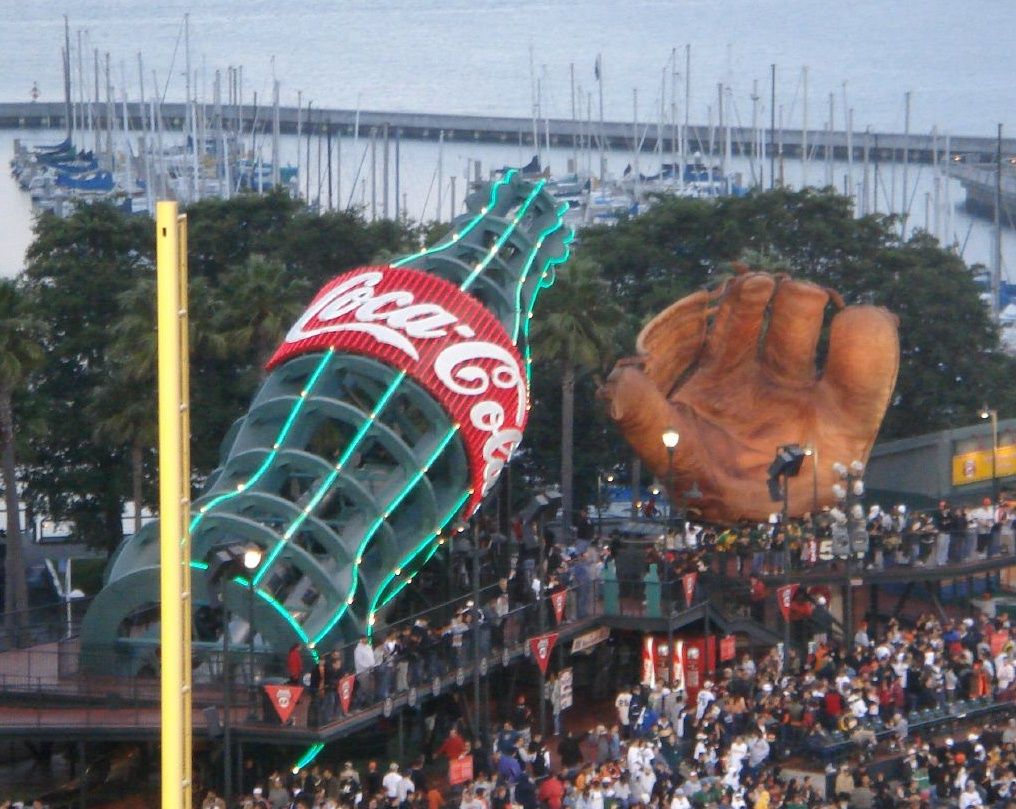
The Coca-Cola bottle and old-fashioned glove

- Beyond right field is a section of the bay, dubbed McCovey Cove after famed Giants first baseman Willie McCovey, into which a number of home runs have been hit on the fly. As of September 17, 2007, 45 "Splash Hits" had been knocked into the Cove by Giants players since the park opened; 35 of those were by Barry Bonds. Opponents had hit the water on the fly 15 times; Todd Hundley of the Los Angeles Dodgers was the first visitor to do so on June 30, 2000. Luis Gonzalez of the Los Angeles Dodgers and Cliff Floyd of the Chicago Cubs are the only visiting players to do so twice, while Carlos Delgado of the New York Mets has performed the feat three times. Across the cove from the ballpark is McCovey Point and China Basin Park, featuring monuments to past Giants legends.

== Player stats ==
=== Starters by position ===
Note: Pos = Position; G = Games played; AB = At bats; H = Hits; Avg. = Batting average; HR = Home runs; RBI = Runs batted in

| Pos | Player | G | AB | H | Avg. | HR | RBI |
|---|---|---|---|---|---|---|---|
| C | Bobby Estalella | 106 | 299 | 70 | .234 | 14 | 53 |
| 1B | J.T. Snow | 155 | 536 | 152 | .284 | 19 | 96 |
| 2B | Jeff Kent | 159 | 587 | 196 | .334 | 33 | 125 |
| SS | Rich Aurilia | 141 | 509 | 138 | .271 | 20 | 79 |
| 3B | Bill Mueller | 153 | 560 | 150 | .268 | 10 | 55 |
| LF | Barry Bonds | 143 | 480 | 147 | .306 | 49 | 106 |
| CF | Marvin Benard | 149 | 560 | 147 | .263 | 12 | 55 |
| RF | Ellis Burks | 122 | 393 | 135 | .344 | 24 | 96 |

==== Other batters ====
Note: G = Games played; AB = At bats; H = Hits; Avg. = Batting average; HR = Home runs; RBI = Runs batted in

| Player | G | AB | H | Avg. | HR | RBI |
|---|---|---|---|---|---|---|
| Armando Ríos | 115 | 233 | 62 | .266 | 10 | 50 |
| Doug Mirabelli | 82 | 230 | 53 | .230 | 6 | 28 |
| Calvin Murray | 108 | 194 | 47 | .242 | 2 | 22 |
| Ramón Martínez | 88 | 189 | 57 | .302 | 6 | 25 |
| Russ Davis | 80 | 180 | 47 | .261 | 9 | 24 |
| Felipe Crespo | 89 | 131 | 38 | .290 | 4 | 29 |
| Terrell Lowery | 24 | 34 | 15 | .441 | 1 | 5 |
| Juan Melo | 11 | 13 | 1 | .077 | 0 | 1 |
| Damon Minor | 10 | 9 | 4 | .444 | 3 | 6 |
| Scott Servais | 7 | 8 | 2 | .250 | 0 | 0 |
| Pedro Feliz | 8 | 7 | 2 | .286 | 0 | 0 |

=== Starting pitchers ===
Note: G = Games; IP = Innings pitched: W = Wins; L = Losses; ERA = Earned run average; SO = Strikeouts

| Player | G | IP | W | L | ERA | SO |
|---|---|---|---|---|---|---|
| Liván Hernández | 33 | 240.0 | 17 | 11 | 3.75 | 165 |
| Russ Ortiz | 33 | 195.2 | 14 | 12 | 5.01 | 167 |
| Shawn Estes | 30 | 190.1 | 15 | 6 | 4.26 | 136 |
| Kirk Reuter | 32 | 184.0 | 11 | 9 | 3.96 | 71 |
| Joe Nathan | 20 | 93.1 | 5 | 2 | 5.21 | 61 |

==== Other pitchers ====
Note: G = Games pitched; IP = Innings pitched; W = Wins; L = Losses; ERA = Earned run average; SO = Strikeouts

| Player | G | IP | W | L | ERA | SO |
|---|---|---|---|---|---|---|
| Mark Gardner | 30 | 149.1 | 11 | 7 | 4.05 | 92 |

===== Relief pitchers =====
Note: G = Games: W = Wins: L = Losses; SV = Saves; ERA = Earned run average; SO = Strikeouts

| Player | G | W | L | SV | ERA | SO |
|---|---|---|---|---|---|---|
| Robb Nen | 68 | 4 | 3 | 41 | 1.50 | 92 |
| Félix Rodríguez | 76 | 4 | 2 | 3 | 2.64 | 95 |
| Alan Embree | 63 | 3 | 5 | 2 | 4.95 | 49 |
| Aaron Fultz | 58 | 5 | 2 | 1 | 4.67 | 62 |
| John Johnstone | 47 | 3 | 4 | 0 | 6.30 | 37 |
| Doug Henry | 27 | 3 | 1 | 0 | 2.49 | 16 |
| Miguel Del Toro | 9 | 2 | 0 | 0 | 5.19 | 16 |
| Ben Weber | 9 | 0 | 1 | 0 | 14.63 | 6 |
| Chad Zerbe | 4 | 0 | 0 | 0 | 4.50 | 5 |
| Ryan Vogelsong | 4 | 0 | 0 | 0 | 0.00 | 6 |
| Scott Linebrink | 3 | 0 | 0 | 0 | 11.57 | 0 |

== National League Divisional Playoffs ==
=== San Francisco Giants vs. New York Mets ===
New York wins series, 3–1.

| Game | Score | Date |
|---|---|---|
| 1 | San Francisco 5, New York 1 | October 4 |
| 2 | New York 5, San Francisco 4 (10 innings) | October 5 |
| 3 | New York 3, San Francisco 2 (13 innings) | October 7 |
| 4 | New York 4, San Francisco 0 | October 8 |

== Award winners ==
- Ellis Burks, Outfield, Willie Mac Award

All-Star Game

- Jeff Kent, second base, starter
- Barry Bonds elected to start but unable to play due to injury

National League Most Valuable Player: Jeff Kent, Second Base

== Farm system ==
| Level | Team | League | Manager |
|---|---|---|---|
| AAA | Fresno Grizzlies | Pacific Coast League | Shane Turner |
| AA | Shreveport Captains | Texas League | Bill Hayes |
| A | Bakersfield Blaze | California League | Lenn Sakata |
| A | San Jose Giants | California League | Keith Comstock |
| A-Short Season | Salem-Keizer Volcanoes | Northwest League | Fred Stanley |
| Rookie | AZL Giants | Arizona League | Lemmie Miller |
