= Bubba Carpenter =

American baseball player (born 1968)

- Outfielder
- Born: July 23, 1968 (age 57); Dallas, Texas, U.S.
- Batted: Left Threw: Left

MLB debut
- May 13, 2000, for the Colorado Rockies

Last MLB appearance
- June 6, 2000, for the Colorado Rockies

MLB statistics
- Batting average: .222
- Hits: 6
- Home runs: 3
- Runs batted in: 5

KBO statistics
- Batting average: .282
- Hits: 40
- Home runs: 5
- Runs batted in: 32
- Stats at Baseball Reference

Teams
- Colorado Rockies (2000); Hyundai Unicorns (2000)

Charles Sydney "Bubba" Carpenter (born July 23, 1968) is an American former professional baseball outfielder and designated hitter. He played in Major League Baseball (MLB) for the Colorado Rockies, and in the KBO League for the Hyundai Unicorns in the 2000 season.

== Career ==
Carpenter attended college at the University of Arkansas and is 6 foot 1 and 185 pounds. Carpenter was signed as a free agent by the New York Yankees in 1991, and made his Major League debut on May 13, 2000, and played his final game on June 6, 2000. In 15 career games, he was 6 for 27, a .222 average. 3 of his 6 career hits were home runs. In his career, he was also a member of the New York Yankees organization.
