= Scott Karl =

American baseball player (born 1971)

- Pitcher
- Born: August 9, 1971 (age 54); Fontana, California, U.S.
- Batted: Left Threw: Left

MLB debut
- May 4, 1995, for the Milwaukee Brewers

Last MLB appearance
- September 28, 2000, for the Anaheim Angels

MLB statistics
- Win–loss record: 54–56
- Earned run average: 4.81
- Strikeouts: 513
- Stats at Baseball Reference

Teams
- Milwaukee Brewers (1995–1999); Colorado Rockies (2000); Anaheim Angels (2000)

Randall Scott Karl (born August 9, 1971) is an American former professional baseball player who pitched in the Major Leagues from 1995–2000. Karl played for the Milwaukee Brewers, Colorado Rockies, and Anaheim Angels. He wore uniform number 42 prior to Major League Baseball retiring the number to honor Jackie Robinson.
