= Gabe White =

American baseball player (born 1971)

- Pitcher
- Born: November 20, 1971 (age 53); Sebring, Florida, U.S.
- Batted: Left Threw: Left

MLB debut
- May 27, 1994, for the Montreal Expos

Last MLB appearance
- June 7, 2005, for the St. Louis Cardinals

MLB statistics
- Win–loss record: 34–26
- Earned run average: 4.51
- Strikeouts: 454
- Stats at Baseball Reference

Teams
- Montreal Expos (1994–1995); Cincinnati Reds (1997–2000); Colorado Rockies (2000–2001); Cincinnati Reds (2002–2003); New York Yankees (2003–2004); Cincinnati Reds (2004); St. Louis Cardinals (2005)

Gabriel Allen White (born November 20, 1971) is an American former professional baseball player who pitched in Major League Baseball (MLB) from 1994 to 2005. White gave up Hall of Famer Tony Gwynn's final hit of his career, on October 6, 2001, while pitching for the Colorado Rockies.

== Minor-league career ==
White was drafted in the first round of the 1990 MLB draft by the Montreal Expos after pitching for the Sebring Blue Streaks in high school. After being drafted, White would pitch the remainder of 1990 for the GCL Expos, making 11 starts. He would go 4-2 with a 3.14 ERA in 57 1/3 innings pitched.

For the 1991 season, White would pitch for the Sumter Flyers of the South Atlantic League. Making 24 starts, White would pitch to a 3.26 ERA in 149 innings, amassing a 6-9 record. He would pitch the 1992 season for the Rockford Expos of the Midwest League. Making 27 starts, he would get a 14-8 record and pitch to a 2.84 ERA in 187 innings.

White would be promoted to the Harrisburg Senators of the Eastern League for the 1993 season and pitch well. In 16 starts, White amassed a 7-2 record and a 2.16 ERA in 100 innings. He would get a promotion to the Ottawa Lynx of the International League before season's end. He would make six starts for the Lynx in 1993, pitching to a 2-1 record and 3.12 ERA in 40 1/3 innings. Overall, White had a 9-3 record and a 2.44 ERA in 140 1/3 innings pitched for the 1993 season.

1994 would be White's last season in the minor leagues before getting his promotion.

== Major-league career ==
=== Montreal Expos ===
White made his first start for the Expos on May 27th, 1994 against the Colorado Rockies. In his debut, White would notch a Quality start and a win, pitching six innings of one-run ball in a 4-2 victory, giving up one solo home run to Andres Galarraga. White would make just four more starts for the Expos that season, as he pitched to an 8.79 ERA across his next four starts. White wouldn't make his next appearance for the Expos until July 31st, making two relief appearances before the season was prematurely ended. Overall, White had a 1-1 record, 1 save, and a 6.08 ERA in 23 2/3 innings.

In 1995, the Expos converted White to a relief role, and White would only make one spot start for the Expos in 19 total appearances for the major league club on the season. White continued to struggle with home runs, as he amassed a 7.01 ERA and a 1-2 record in 25 2/3 innings.

=== First stint with the Cincinnati Reds ===
On December 15th, 1995, the Expos traded White to the Cincinnati Reds in exchange for Jhonny Carvajal. White would pitch the entire 1996 season for the Indianapolis Indians as well as the majority of the 1997 season. White would make his first appearance with the Cincinnati Reds on August 9th, 1997. With the Reds bringing White up as a starter, White would make six starts for the Reds in 1997, amassing a 2-2 record and a 4.71 ERA in 36 1/3 innings pitched. The Reds would shift White to the bullpen for the remainder of September, and White would pitch to a 1.93 ERA in 6 appearances and 4 2/3 innings. Overall, White had a 4.39 ERA in 41 innings and a 2-2 record in 1997, with 1 save.

In 1998, White would make his last three major league starts, as he would not start another major league game after April 19th. Late in the season, after closer Jeff Shaw was traded to the Los Angeles Dodgers, White would split save opportunities with Danny Graves for the remainder of the season. Overall, White had 9 saves, a 5-5 record, and a 4.01 ERA in 98 2/3 innings pitched.

The switch to the bullpen full-time saw White's strikeout rate noticeably improve. Although White pitched well in the immediate time after Shaw's departure, Graves would ultimately become the Reds closer for the next four seasons, relegating White to a middle relief role. 1999 would see White's performance regress with home run woes, as White would pitch to a 4.43 ERA and a 1-2 record in 61 innings, surrendering 14 home runs.

=== Colorado Rockies ===
Although White started the 2000 season with the Reds, White was traded just four days after the Reds' season began, with a poor first appearance on the season prompting the Reds to trade White to the Rockies in exchange for Manny Aybar. White would have his best season in the majors in 2000. With the Rockies, White would pitch to a 2.17 ERA in 83 innings, going 11-2 while amassing 5 saves. White's 3.0 Wins Above Replacement under the Fangraphs formula was the highest of all relievers in 2000. White's 84 strikeouts set his single-season personal best. White would also record the last two hits of his career in 2000. On June 10th, White hit his only career home run, a solo home run off of Matt Perisho.

The 2001 season would go very poorly for White, despite pitching the full season. In 67 2/3 innings, White amassed a 1-7 record and a 6.25 ERA. After surrendering just five home runs with the Rockies in 2000, White gave up eighteen home runs in 2001.

=== Second stint with the Cincinnati Reds ===
After the season's conclusion, on December 18th, 2001, the Rockies would trade White and Luke Hudson to the Cincinnati Reds in exchange for Pokey Reese and Dennys Reyes.

The Reds would use White in more of a left-handed specialist role than in prior seasons, as 2002 would be White's first season in which he had fewer innings pitched than games pitched for the season. The 2002 season would go much better for White, as White would go 6-1 while pitching a 2.98 ERA in 54 1/3 innings while recording 19 holds, tying Scott Sullivan for the most on the team that season. Despite his strikeout rate dwindling compared to just a couple seasons ago, White remained effective due to a reduced home run rate.

White would regress with the Reds in 2003, as he would struggle with home runs once again. In 34 1/3 innings with the Reds, White would have a 3-0 record and a 3.93 ERA.

=== New York Yankees ===
On July 31st, 2003, the Reds traded White to the New York Yankees for future considerations. White would pitch 12 1/3 innings for the Yankees in 2003, pitching to a 4.38 ERA and 2-1 record in his first stint in the American League. White would make the postseason roster and pitch in the postseason for the first and only time in his career. He made his first postseason appearance in the 4th and final game of the 2003 ALDS against the Minnesota Twins. With the Yankees up 7-1 in the bottom of the 8th inning, White relieved David Wells after a strong performance. White would strand the two inherited runners and pitch a scoreless ninth inning to finish the game.

White would make his final two postseason appearances in the 2003 ALCS against the Boston Red Sox. In game 1, White would enter in the top of the 7th after Jeff Nelson had given up an RBI single to Kevin Millar. With two outs, White would strand the runners with the bases loaded. White would also pitch a clean 8th inning before the Yankees turned to Jose Contreras to pitch the 9th inning. White would make his last postseason appearance in game 6, relieving Jeff Nelson after Nelson surrendered a double to Bill Mueller. Facing Trot Nixon for the second time in the series, with the Yankees trailing 7-6, White would surrender a two-run home run to make the game 9-6. White would retire the next three batters in order.

Although White would enter free agency, he would re-sign with the Yankess on December 7th, 2003. White would struggle immensely with control and contact in the 2003 season, as White would pitch to an 8.27 ERA in 20 2/3 innings with the Yankees.

=== Third stint with the Cincinnati Reds ===
On June 18th, 2004, the Yankees traded White to the Cincinnati Reds in exchange for Charlie Manning. Back with the Reds for the third time in 5 years, White's struggles would continue, as White's performance only marginally improved to a 6.23 ERA in 39 innings. For the 2004 season as a whole, White had a 6.94 ERA in 59 2/3 innings pitched. Among qualified relievers in 2004, White's ERA was the third highest, with only Todd Van Poppel and Shawn Chacon sporting higher ERA totals. At season's end, White was a free agent.

=== Atlanta Braves ===
On January 7th, 2005, White signed with the Atlanta Braves. White was released at the conclusion of Spring Training.

=== St. Louis Cardinals ===
On April 26th, 2005, White signed with the St. Louis Cardinals. White made 6 appearances for the Cardinals, pitching 8 1/3 innings to a 2.16 ERA. On June 12th, 2005, the Cardinals released White. His last pitching appearance in the major leagues was June 7th. White would not re-sign with another team and would never pitch again.

== Player profile ==
Throughout White's career, he struggled with home runs, as he averaged 1.51 home runs per 9 innings pitched. This was partially due to his heavy flyball profile. In his later seasons, White was nearly twice as likely to induce a flyball on contact compared to a groundball. White's heavy flyball profile also meant that he induced a lot of infield flyballs.

White was mainly a pitch-to-contact style of pitcher, rarely walking batters throughout his career. For his career, White walked less than 6% of batters he faced. White's first years of being a full-time reliever saw his strikeout rate at its best, striking out just under 23% of batters he faced in a 3-year stretch. However, White's strikeout rate saw a sharp decrease after the 2000 season.

Although White was used at times in a lefty specialist role, he typically was used in a more traditional relief role. Between 1998 and 2000, White averaged nearly four outs per appearance in relief.
