= Pokey Reese =

American baseball player (born 1973)

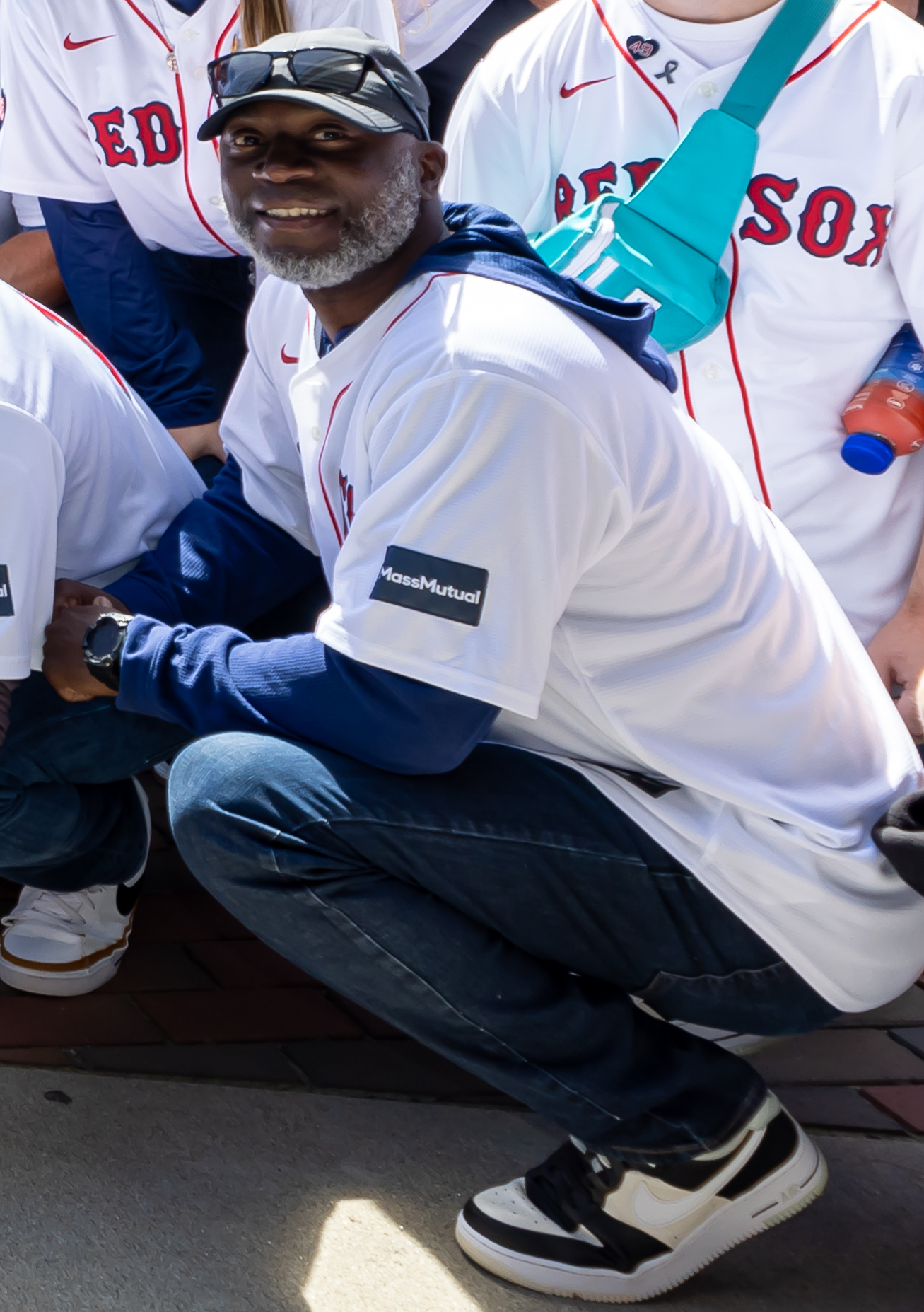
- Reese celebrating the twentieth anniversary of the 2004 World Series
- Second baseman / Shortstop
- Born: June 10, 1973 (age 53); Columbia, South Carolina, U.S.
- Batted: Right Threw: Right

MLB debut
- April 1, 1997, for the Cincinnati Reds

Last MLB appearance
- October 3, 2004, for the Boston Red Sox

MLB statistics
- Batting average: .248
- Home runs: 44
- Runs batted in: 271
- Stolen bases: 144
- Stats at Baseball Reference

Teams
- Cincinnati Reds (1997–2001); Pittsburgh Pirates (2002–2003); Boston Red Sox (2004)

Career highlights and awards
- World Series champion (2004); 2× Gold Glove Award (1999, 2000)

Calvin "Pokey" Reese Jr. (born June 10, 1973) is an American former professional baseball infielder. He played in Major League Baseball (MLB) with the Cincinnati Reds, Pittsburgh Pirates, and Boston Red Sox from 1997 to 2004. With the Red Sox, he won the 2004 World Series over the St. Louis Cardinals. He batted and threw right-handed. Reese was known for his defense, winning two Gold Glove Awards during his career.

== Early life ==
Reese was born in Columbia, South Carolina. Growing up, he lived for a while in a two-room shack with an outhouse, along with eight or nine relatives, on the south end of Columbia. His father, an alcohol and drug addict, was often absent. Reese started playing Little League baseball at the age of nine, using a borrowed glove; he would not own a baseball glove until high school. Reese started at A.C. Flora High School, then transferred to Lower Richland High School, which was better-known for sports. During his sophomore year, major league scouts sent to watch Earl Cunningham were impressed by a long throw he made during a game. He was drafted by the Cincinnati Reds in the first round, 20th overall, of the 1991 MLB draft.

== Career ==
Reese began his professional career with the Princeton Reds of the Rookie-level Appalachian League in 1991. The next season, he moved up to Single-A, joining the Charleston Wheelers of the South Atlantic League.

Reese made his major league debut with the Reds in 1997. He played with the team through 2001, winning two Gold Glove Awards along the way.

Following the 2001 season, the Reds traded Reese and Dennys Reyes to the Colorado Rockies for Luke Hudson and Gabe White on December 18. The next day, the Rockies traded him to the Red Sox for first baseman Scott Hatteberg. The Red Sox did not tender him a contract, making him a free agent two days later. On January 30, 2002, he signed with the Pirates.

In 2003, Reese turned down a higher-paying deal from Pittsburgh to play for the Red Sox. On May 8, 2004, at Fenway Park, Reese had the first two-home run game of his career in a Red Sox 9-1 victory over the Kansas City Royals. Reese hit an inside-the-park home run and one over the Green Monster, to snap a 172 at-bat homerless streak dating back to April 4, 2003. The last Red Sox player to hit a conventional homer and an inside-the-park homer in the same game was Tony Armas on September 24, 1983, at Tiger Stadium.

Reese fielded a ground ball from Rubén Sierra and threw to Doug Mientkiewicz for the final out of the 2004 ALCS, as the Red Sox won their first pennant since 1986. They won the 2004 World Series a week later.

On January 5, 2005, Reese signed with the Seattle Mariners, but never played in a game before being put on the 60-day disabled list and missing the entire season due to injury.

In 2006, Reese signed a one-year deal with the Florida Marlins; however, his contract was terminated on March 5, 2006, after he left the club on March 1 and did not have direct contact with anyone on the team for over 72 hours. Mike Nicotera, his agent, said the departure was for personal reasons.

In 2008, Reese signed a minor league contract with the Washington Nationals and played for the Triple-A Columbus Clippers where in two games he strained both hamstrings and was placed on the DL for several weeks. On July 3, 2008, he returned from the disabled list to the Single-A Hagerstown Suns, but was quickly sent back up again to Triple-A Columbus. He became a free agent at the end of the season, after which he retired from professional baseball.

== Playing style ==
At the plate, Reese struck out much more often than he walked, posting a career 0.43 walk-to-strikeout ratio (226-to-531). Reese was a high-percentage base stealer (144-for-170), Reese had a career .307 on-base percentage.

In an eight-year career, Reese was a .248 hitter with 44 home runs and 271 RBI in 856 games.

== After retirement ==
In May 2015, Reese was named the high school baseball coach at his alma mater, Lower Richland High School in Hopkins, South Carolina.

== Personal life ==
Reese was engaged to be married to Tieronay Duckett, a classmate of his at Lower Richland, with whom he had a daughter in November 1992. However, his fiancée died in a car accident in 1993 while on the way to a dry cleaner. Reese also had a son with Rhonda Richardson in September 1992; Richardson would die in childbirth three-and-a-half years later. Reese had a third child, MacKayla Barnes, in 1997.
