= Wiki González =

Venezuelan baseball player (born 1974)

- Catcher
- Born: May 17, 1974 (age 52); Maracay, Aragua, Venezuela
- Batted: Right Threw: Right

MLB debut
- August 14, 1999, for the San Diego Padres

Last MLB appearance
- May 24, 2006, for the Washington Nationals

MLB statistics
- Batting average: .239
- Home runs: 17
- Runs batted in: 103
- Stats at Baseball Reference

Teams
- San Diego Padres (1999–2003); Seattle Mariners (2005); Washington Nationals (2006)

Wiklenman Vicente González (born May 17, 1974) is a Venezuelan former professional baseball catcher. He played in Major League Baseball (MLB) for the San Diego Padres, Seattle Mariners, and Washington Nationals in parts of seven seasons from 1999 to 2006. Listed at 5 ft 11 in (1.80 m), 175 pounds (79 kg), González batted and threw right-handed.

== Career ==
González signed with the Pittsburgh Pirates in 1992. After two seasons in the Dominican Summer League he made his American debut in 1994. The San Diego Padres selected him in the minors league phase of the Rule 5 Draft in December 1996. He was named the best defensive catcher in the Southern League by its managers in 1999. Baseball America called him the Padres' eighth best prospect and best defensive catcher entering the 2000 season.

The Padres purchased González's contract on August 13, 1999. In his MLB debut the next day, he went 3-for-4 with a triple and threw out a would-be base stealer. He hit .253 with 3 home runs in his first major league season.

His most productive MLB season came in 2001, when he batted a .275/.335/.463 slash line with eight homers and 27 runs batted in (RBI).

A slow runner, González hit into a 5-4-3 triple play on May 17, 2002, his birthday, in a game against the New York Mets. He dealt with hand, elbow, and hip injuries that season.

The Padres traded González to the Seattle Mariners after the 2003 season as part of a package sending Jeff Cirillo to San Diego. In 2004, he played only 13 games in the minors before tearing the ACL in his right knee in May. He returned to the majors in 2005. He became a free agent after the season and signed with the Washington Nationals in 2006.

In a seven-season MLB career, González posted a .238 batting average with 17 home runs, 103 RBI, 75 runs, 41 doubles, three triples, and three stolen bases in 283 games played.

González played for the Triple-A Charlotte Knights in 2007. In 2008, he signed with the St. George Roadrunners of the independent Golden Baseball League. Then, in February 2009 he was traded to the Sussex Skyhawks of the Can-Am League. He was released on April 2.

In his offseasons, González played winter ball with four clubs of the Venezuelan League during the 1993–2010 seasons.

== See also ==
- List of Major League Baseball players from Venezuela
