= Elvis Peña =

Dominican baseball player (born 1974)

- Second baseman
- Born: August 15, 1974 (age 51); San Pedro de Macorís, Dominican Republic
- Batted: Both Threw: Right

MLB debut
- September 2, 2000, for the Colorado Rockies

Last MLB appearance
- October 7, 2001, for the Milwaukee Brewers

MLB statistics
- Batting average: .245
- Hits: 12
- Stats at Baseball Reference

Teams
- Colorado Rockies (2000); Milwaukee Brewers (2001)

Elvis Mendez Peña (born August 15, 1974 (originally thought to be September 15, 1976) is a Dominican former Major League Baseball second baseman who played for two seasons. He played for the Colorado Rockies in 2000 and the Milwaukee Brewers in 2001.

Originally signed by the Colorado Rockies in 1993, Peña made his professional debut with the AZL Rockies in 1994. He split the 1995 season with the Asheville Tourists and Portland Rockies before being promoted to the Salem Avalanche, where he spent the 1996 and 1997 seasons. He returned to Asheville for the 1998 season, where he had a .287 batting average in 115 games. In 1999, Peña played for the Carolina Mudcats, and had a .301 batting average in 110 games. He also played 13 games for the Colorado Springs Sky Sox.

In 2000, Peña played in 126 games for the Mudcats, and had a .300 batting average, which included a 19-game hitting streak to end the first half of the season. He also finished the season with 48 stolen bases and 92 runs scored, both of which led the Carolina League. As a result, the Colorado Rockies called him up to the major leagues. He made his debut on September 2, 2000, and played in 10 games for the team. Just before the 2001 season began, Peña was traded to the Milwaukee Brewers along with Mike DeJean, Mark Leiter for Kane Davis, Juan Acevedo, and Jose Flores.

Peña spent 2001 with the Indianapolis Indians, hitting .240 in 127 games for them. He was called up to the Brewers major league roster in September, and played in 15 games for the team. After splitting time with the Indians and Huntsville Stars, he was released from the Brewers organization. After playing for the unaffiliated Long Island Ducks in 2003, Peña returned to the Rockies organization and played for the Sky Sox in 2004 and 2005. After spending 2006 with the Ducks, he spent 2007 with Telemarket Rimini of the Italian Baseball League, and retired after spending the offseason playing in the Dominican Winter League.
