= Miguel del Toro =

Mexican baseball player (1972-2001)

Miguel Del Toro
- Pitcher
- Born: June 22, 1972; San Ignacio Río Muerto, Sonora Mexico
- Died: October 6, 2001 (aged 29); Ciudad Obregón, Sonora, Mexico
- Batted: Right Threw: Right

Professional debut
- MLB: April 6, 1999, for the San Francisco Giants
- NPB: April 14, 2001, for the Seibu Lions

Last appearance
- MLB: October 1, 2000, for the San Francisco Giants
- NPB: August 27, 2001, for the Seibu Lions

MLB statistics
- Win–loss record: 2–0
- Earned run average: 4.61
- Strikeouts: 36

NPB statistics
- Win–loss record: 1–1
- Earned run average: 5.59
- Strikeouts: 19
- Stats at Baseball Reference

Teams
- San Francisco Giants (1999–2000); Seibu Lions (2001)

Miguel Alfonso Del Toro Gastelum (June 22, 1972 – October 6, 2001) was a Mexican professional baseball pitcher. Born in Mexico, Del Toro pitched for the San Francisco Giants during the 1999 and 2000 seasons.

== Career ==
Del Toro was a member of the Pittsburgh Pirates organization through the majority of the '90s. However, beyond one brief spring training appearance, he remained in his native Mexico. Born in Sonora and a resident of Mexico City, Del Toro was a pitcher for the Mexico City Red Devils. He became serious about making it to Major League Baseball when he arrived for the Pirates' 1998 Spring training. After not making the 40 man roster, he was granted free agency.

After impressing the Giants in Spring training, Del Toro made not only the 40 man roster, but the 1999 Opening Day 25 man list. Later, he was optioned to the Pacific Coast League's Fresno Grizzlies. At Triple-A Fresno, Del Toro played as both a starter and a reliever. He continued to play in both the minors and the majors, finishing the season with a 4.18 ERA in 14 games and 20 strikeouts.

Wearing No. 37, Del Toro began the season in Fresno. His first career Major League Baseball victory came against the Montreal Expos. Del Toro relieved Kirk Rueter, pitching two scoreless innings. He struck out two and shook off a line drive off his leg.

Del Toro had his second major league victory on September 23, 2000. Del Toro lasted five innings, striking out four. He continued to pitch for the remainder of the year, including the final defensive inning of the year, working Game 5 of the 2000 National League Division Series against the New York Mets. After the year, the Giants sold his contract to the Japanese League's Seibu Lions.

Del Toro's days in Major League Baseball were over, leaving the Giants with 2000 season stats of a 2–0 record and a 5.19 ERA.

== Death ==
Days after Del Toro cut ties with Seibu, he was traveling with two companions in Ciudad Obregón. Del Toro's car collided with an agricultural tractor, killing him and his two companions; Del Toro was 29. Del Toro was survived by his expecting wife, Eloisa, and two children – Maria and Michelle.

The Giants honored Del Toro's life with a brief moment of silence, and Seibu left his Japanese League No. 32 unworn for the following season.
