= Justin Brunette =

American baseball player (born 1975)

- Pitcher
- Born: October 7, 1975 (age 50); Los Alamitos, California, U.S.
- Batted: Left Threw: Left

MLB debut
- April 13, 2000, for the St. Louis Cardinals

Last MLB appearance
- May 12, 2000, for the St. Louis Cardinals

MLB statistics
- Win–loss record: 0–0
- Earned run average: 5.79
- Strikeouts: 2
- Stats at Baseball Reference

Teams
- St. Louis Cardinals (2000)

Justin Thomas Brunette (born October 7, 1975) is an American former Major League Baseball pitcher. Brunette played for the St. Louis Cardinals in 2000.

A single in his only at-bat left Brunette with a rare MLB career batting average of 1.000.
