= Craig House (baseball) =

Japanese baseball player (born 1977)

- Pitcher
- Born: July 8, 1977 (age 49); Okinawa, Japan
- Batted: Right Threw: Right

MLB debut
- August 6, 2000, for the Colorado Rockies

Last MLB appearance
- September 28, 2000, for the Colorado Rockies

MLB statistics
- Win–loss record: 1-1
- Earned run average: 7.24
- Strikeouts: 8
- Stats at Baseball Reference

Teams
- Colorado Rockies (2000)

Craig Michael House (born July 8, 1977) is a former Major League Baseball pitcher who played for the Colorado Rockies in 2000.

A native of Okinawa, Japan, House attended the University of Memphis. In 1998, he played collegiate summer baseball with the Wareham Gatemen of the Cape Cod Baseball League. House was drafted by the Colorado Rockies in the 12th round of the 1999 Major League Baseball draft. He made his debut on August 8, 2000, with the Rockies.

House pitched in 16 games for Colorado in 2000, his only major league season, posting one win, with one loss, and a 7.24 ERA. He was part of a three-team trade in January 2002 involving the Rockies, New York Mets, and Milwaukee Brewers, and was selected off waivers by the Los Angeles Dodgers in February, but was released at the end of the year. After not catching on with the Seattle Mariners, Florida Marlins, Baltimore Orioles, or Texas Rangers, he retired after 2005.
