= Rich Croushore =

American baseball player (born 1970)

- Relief pitcher
- Born: August 7, 1970 (age 54); Lakehurst, New Jersey, U.S.
- Batted: Right Threw: Right

MLB debut
- May 18, 1998, for the St. Louis Cardinals

Last MLB appearance
- October 1, 2000, for the Boston Red Sox

MLB statistics
- Win–loss record: 5–11
- Earned run average: 4.88
- Strikeouts: 149
- Stats at Baseball Reference

Teams
- St. Louis Cardinals (1998–1999); Colorado Rockies (2000); Boston Red Sox (2000)

Richard Steven Croushore (born August 7, 1970) is an American former professional baseball relief pitcher who played for three different teams between 1998 and 2000. Listed at 6' 4", 210 lb., Croushore batted and threw right-handed. He was signed by the St. Louis Cardinals as an amateur free agent in 1993 out of James Madison University.

Croushore reached the Major League Baseball (MLB) in 1998 with the St. Louis Cardinals, spending two years with them before moving to the Colorado Rockies (2000) and Boston Red Sox (2000). His most productive season came in 1999 with St. Louis, when he posted career-highs in games (59), wins (3), ERA (4.14), strikeouts (88), and innings pitched (71 2/3).

In a three-season career, Croushore had a 5–11 record with a 4.88 ERA and 11 saves in 111 appearances.
