= Mike Mohler =

American baseball player (born 1968)

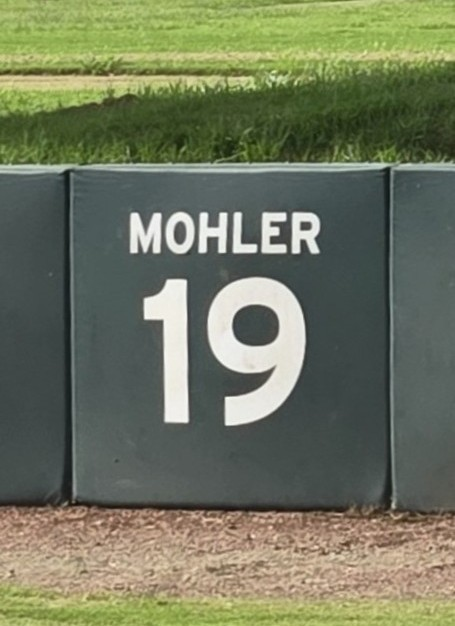
- Mohler, Nicholls Colonels retired numbers
- Pitcher
- Born: July 26, 1968 (age 57); Dayton, Ohio, U.S.
- Batted: Right Threw: Left

MLB debut
- April 7, 1993, for the Oakland Athletics

Last MLB appearance
- October 7, 2001, for the Arizona Diamondbacks

MLB statistics
- Win–loss record: 14–27
- Earned run average: 4.99
- Strikeouts: 281
- Stats at Baseball Reference

Teams
- Oakland Athletics (1993–1998); St. Louis Cardinals (1999–2000); Cleveland Indians (2000); Arizona Diamondbacks (2001)

Michael Ross Mohler (born July 26, 1968) is an American former professional baseball player. A pitcher, Mohler played for the Oakland Athletics, St. Louis Cardinals, Cleveland Indians, and Arizona Diamondbacks of Major League Baseball (MLB) from 1993 to 2001. He attended East Ascension High School and Nicholls State University, playing on the baseball teams of both.
