= Carlos Hernández (catcher) =

Venezuelan baseball player (born 1967)

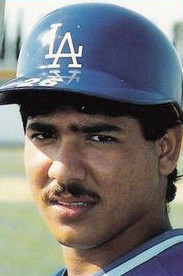
- Hernández in 1988
- Catcher
- Born: May 24, 1967 (age 58); San Félix, Venezuela
- Batted: Right Threw: Right

MLB debut
- April 20, 1990, for the Los Angeles Dodgers

Last MLB appearance
- October 1, 2000, for the St. Louis Cardinals

MLB statistics
- Batting average: .253
- Home runs: 24
- Runs batted in: 141
- Stats at Baseball Reference

Teams
- Los Angeles Dodgers (1990–1996); San Diego Padres (1997–1998, 2000); St. Louis Cardinals (2000)

Carlos Alberto Hernández Almeida [er-NAN-dez] (born May 24, 1967) is a Venezuelan former Major League Baseball catcher who played for the Los Angeles Dodgers (1990–1996), San Diego Padres (1997–2000) and St. Louis Cardinals (2000).

== Career ==
Signed by the Dodgers as a free agent in 1984, Hernández became the second Venezuelan catcher in MLB history, following Bo Díaz. He made his major league debut in the 1990 season, basically as a backup for Mike Scioscia. A high skilled defensive player, Hernández spent his Dodgers career as mainly a back-up catcher to Scioscia and Mike Piazza, appearing in 230 games, including 133 starts. He signed as a free agent with San Diego and later was traded to the Cardinals.

In his first full major league season as a regular catcher for the Padres, Hernández batted .262, with 9 home runs and 52 runs batted in in 129 games played. In 22 postseason games, he hit .299 (20-67) with one homer and two RBI.

Hernández finished his career batting .253 (315–1244) with 24 home runs, 141 RBI, 102 runs, 51 doubles, one triple, and one stolen base in 488 games played.

Hernández started his career as a manager with the Toros de Tijuana in the Mexican League for the 2004 season. He then returned to the San Diego Padres organization as a catching coordinator from 2005 to 2007. He also managed the Leones de Caracas from the Venezuelan Professional Baseball League from 2006 to 2008.

Hernández returned to the San Diego Padres in 2012 as a color analyst for Spanish game broadcasts on Fox Deportes and their Spanish radio broadcast on XEMO.

Hernández owned 'Caribbean Flavor', a Venezuelan restaurant in the San Diego suburb of Poway, but the restaurant closed in 2011.

== See also ==
- List of Major League Baseball players from Venezuela
