= Danny Graves =

Baseball player (born 1973)

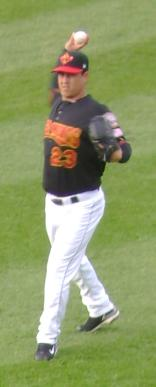
- Graves with the Rochester Red Wings in 2008
- Pitcher
- Born: August 7, 1973 (age 53); Saigon, South Vietnam
- Batted: Right Threw: Right

MLB debut
- July 13, 1996, for the Cleveland Indians

Last MLB appearance
- May 9, 2006, for the Cleveland Indians

MLB statistics
- Win–loss record: 43–44
- Earned run average: 4.05
- Strikeouts: 429
- Saves: 182
- Stats at Baseball Reference

Teams
- Cleveland Indians (1996–1997); Cincinnati Reds (1997–2005); New York Mets (2005); Cleveland Indians (2006)

Career highlights and awards
- 2× All-Star (2000, 2004); Cincinnati Reds Hall of Fame

Daniel Peter Graves (born August 7, 1973) is a former professional baseball player and current baseball analyst. He played in Major League Baseball (MLB) as a right-handed pitcher from 1996 to 2006, most prominently as a member of the Cincinnati Reds where he was their primary relief pitcher for five seasons and became the franchise's all-time leader in career saves. A two-time National League All-Star, Graves was the winner of the 2002 Lou Gehrig Memorial Award. Graves also pitched for the Cleveland Indians and the New York Mets.

Born to a Vietnamese mother and an American serviceman father, Graves is the only Vietnam-born player in Major League history and one of the few American players of Vietnamese descent. After his playing career, he became a radio and television baseball analyst. Graves was inducted into the Cincinnati Reds Hall of Fame in 2023.

== Early life ==
During the Vietnam War, Graves was born in Saigon to Thao and Jim Graves, a U.S. Army sergeant. The family fled the country when Graves was 14 months old after they learned of the impending fall of Saigon. After settling in the United States, Graves and his brother, Frank, spoke Vietnamese until teasing from classmates caused them to abandon the language.

=== High school and college ===
He graduated from Brandon High School in Brandon, Florida, and was awarded a baseball scholarship to the University of Miami. As a right-handed relief pitcher for the school as a junior, he posted a 0.89 earned run average and led collegiate baseball with a school-record 21 saves.

== Professional career ==
=== Cleveland Indians ===
The Cleveland Indians selected Graves in the fourth round of the 1994 Major League Baseball draft. He tore his ACL during the College World Series two days after being drafted. After a year of rehabilitation, he was named Cleveland's top minor league pitcher of 1995 and was in the major leagues a year later.

=== Cincinnati Reds ===
He was traded to the Cincinnati Reds in July with three other players for John Smiley and Jeff Branson in 1997.

In his first nine seasons with Cleveland and Cincinnati, Graves compiled a 40–42 record as a pitcher with 406 strikeouts, a 3.89 ERA, and 172 saves in 755.2 innings. He is the only player ever to have more than one season in which all his hits were home runs. This happened in 2000 and 2001, with one homer each.

In 2003, Graves was converted into a starter. He went 4–14 as a starter in 26 starts.

In 2004, Graves was again used as a closer. On April 16, 2004, Graves gave up a milestone and game-tying home run to Sammy Sosa in the bottom of the ninth inning. The game ended two pitches later, with Graves allowing a walk-off home run to Moisés Alou. Graves went on to save 41 games in the 2004 season.

The 2005 season did not start well for Graves. He struggled, posting a 7.36 ERA through 20 games. Fans in Cincinnati took notice and consistently booed Graves, leading up to a May 23 incident when Graves made an obscene hand gesture to a fan that leaned in the dugout after being called a "gook" while getting taken out of the game by Reds manager Dave Miley. The Reds quickly released Graves after the incident.

Graves was inducted into the Cincinnati Reds Hall of Fame on July 15, 2023.

=== New York Mets ===
Graves was then signed as a free agent by the New York Mets on June 11, 2005.

After putting up a 5.89 ERA with the Mets, he was designated for assignment on August 23, 2005. He cleared waivers and was sent to Triple-A Norfolk on August 26, but was called back to the Mets when rosters expanded. Graves was 0–2 with an 18.00 ERA in five games with Norfolk.

On December 19, 2005, Graves signed a minor league contract with the Cleveland Indians. He pitched well in spring training, earning a spot in the Indians' bullpen, but was designated for assignment on May 12, 2006, after he opened the season with a 2–1 record and 5.79 ERA in 13 relief appearances.

On May 18, 2006, Graves was assigned to the Indians' Triple-A affiliate, the Buffalo Bisons, in Buffalo. He finished the 2006 season with the Bisons with a 4.01 ERA (1 Win, 1 Loss).

=== Colorado Rockies ===
Graves signed a minor league deal with the Rockies on December 19, 2006. He was released during spring training in March 2007.

=== Long Island Ducks ===
During the 2007 season, Graves was on the roster of the Long Island Ducks of the independent Atlantic League of Professional Baseball, leading the league in saves.

=== Minnesota Twins ===
Graves later signed with the Minnesota Twins on March 30, 2008, and played for the Triple-A Rochester Red Wings most of the year.

=== Houston Astros ===
He became a free agent at the end of the 2008 season and signed a minor league contract with the Houston Astros in January 2009. The Astros released him on March 25, 2009.

== Broadcasting career ==
Graves is now a baseball analyst on 120 Sports, "The Rally" on Bally Sports network, MLB.com, MLB Network Radio Sirius XM, and ESPN Radio. He joined the Reds Radio Network to do color commentary for select games in 2018.

== Personal life ==
Graves is married with two children and has four children from a previous marriage.

He has made a number of trips back to Vietnam for post-war goodwill purposes, family reconnection and introduced the game of baseball to the Vietnamese public to whom the sports was largely foreign. Most notably, Graves led a baseball-focused goodwill tour organized by the Vietnam Veterans Memorial Fund (VVMF) in January 2006, in which he held clinics in a number of locations in Vietnam, opening a newly built baseball field sponsored by the VVMF and Major League Baseball in Quang Tri province, which was the first in the country. As of April 2026, the field has been largely repurposed for soccer and athletics.
