= Heathcliff Slocumb =

American baseball player (born 1966)

- Pitcher
- Born: June 7, 1966 (age 60); Jamaica, New York, U.S.
- Batted: Right Threw: Right

MLB debut
- April 11, 1991, for the Chicago Cubs

Last MLB appearance
- September 26, 2000, for the San Diego Padres

MLB statistics
- Win–loss record: 28–37
- Earned run average: 4.08
- Strikeouts: 513
- Saves: 98
- Stats at Baseball Reference

Teams
- Chicago Cubs (1991–1993); Cleveland Indians (1993); Philadelphia Phillies (1994–1995); Boston Red Sox (1996–1997); Seattle Mariners (1997–1998); Baltimore Orioles (1999); St. Louis Cardinals (1999–2000); San Diego Padres (2000)

Career highlights and awards
- All-Star (1995)

Heath "Heathcliff" Slocumb (born June 7, 1966) is an American former Major League Baseball (MLB) relief pitcher. He batted and threw right-handed.

== Early life and amateur career ==
As a child, Slocumb was nicknamed "Heathcliff" after the comic strip cat of the same name.

Slocumb did not play Little League or even sandlot baseball as a child. According to his high school coach, he first played baseball when he showed up to tryouts as a junior at John Bowne High School in Flushing, Queens without a glove. According to a scout, his high school coach told him Slocumb was a football player who had tried out for every team at the school. Despite a strong arm, Slocumb had poor pitching mechanics and was not selected in the 1984 MLB draft. Slocumb caught the attention of a New York Mets scout who put him on an amateur team until July 17, 1984 when the Mets signed him for $5,000 (equivalent to $15,500 in 2025).

== Professional career ==
In a 10-year career, Slocumb played with the Chicago Cubs, Cleveland Indians, Philadelphia Phillies, Boston Red Sox, Seattle Mariners, Baltimore Orioles, St. Louis Cardinals, and San Diego Padres.

An All-Star selection in 1995, Slocumb compiled a career 28–37 record with 513 strikeouts and a 4.08 ERA in 631 innings. He collected 98 saves, including 32 for the Phillies in 1995 and 31 with Boston in 1996.

Slocumb was traded in mid-1997 from Boston to Seattle for pitcher Derek Lowe and catcher Jason Varitek, in what is often cited in retrospect as one of the most one-sided trades in baseball history. At the time, Lowe had pitched in only 12 major-league games with an ERA of nearly 7, and Varitek had never played in the majors. However, Lowe and Varitek both went on to make multiple All-Star teams and were major contributors to the 2004 World Series Champion Red Sox, and were inducted into the team's Hall of Fame after their careers. In 2005, Varitek was named captain of the Red Sox. Although Slocumb helped the Mariners make the playoffs in 1997, his career had dissipated significantly by 1998 and he was never effective again.

== Personal life ==
Slocumb married and had two daughters with his high school sweetheart, Deborah, before she died of breast cancer in 1992. The daughters lived with their maternal grandmother in Richmond Hill, Queens during his playing career.
