= 2000 Cleveland Indians season =

2000 Cleveland Indians
- League: American League
- Division: Central
- Ballpark: Jacobs Field
- City: Cleveland, Ohio
- Record: 90–72 (.556)
- Divisional place: 2nd
- Owners: Richard Jacobs (until February 16, 2000), Larry Dolan (from February 16)
- General managers: John Hart
- Managers: Charlie Manuel
- Television: WUAB; Jack Corrigan, Mike Hegan; FSN Ohio; John Sanders, Rick Manning
- Radio: WTAM; Tom Hamilton, Matt Underwood, Mike Hegan

The 2000 Cleveland Indians season was the 100th season for the franchise, within the American Major League Baseball organization. For the season two new players were signed; Chris Coste and Mark Whiten. The results of the season consisted of 90 wins and 72 losses. The Indians failed to win the AL Central and make the playoffs for the first time since 1993.

== Offseason ==
- November 16, 1999: Chris Coste was signed as a free agent by the Indians.
- February 18, 2000: Mark Whiten was signed as a free agent by the Indians.

== Regular season ==
=== Season standings ===
AL Central
Team	W	L	Pct.	GB	Home	Road
Chicago White Sox	95	67	.586	—	46‍–‍35	49‍–‍32
Cleveland Indians	90	72	.556	5	48‍–‍33	42‍–‍39
Detroit Tigers	79	83	.488	16	43‍–‍38	36‍–‍45
Kansas City Royals	77	85	.475	18	42‍–‍39	35‍–‍46
Minnesota Twins	69	93	.426	26	36‍–‍45	33‍–‍48

=== Record vs. opponents ===
2000 American League record Source: MLB Standings Grid – 2000
Team	ANA	BAL	BOS	CWS	CLE	DET	KC	MIN	NYY	OAK	SEA	TB	TEX	TOR	NL
Anaheim	—	7–5	5–4	4–6	3–6	5–5	6–6	7–3	5–5	5–8	5–8	6–6	7–5	5–7	12–6
Baltimore	5–7	—	5–7	4–6	5–4	6–4	3–7	6–3	5–7	4–8	3–7	8–5	6–6	7–6	7–11
Boston	4–5	7–5	—	7–5	6–6	7–5	4–6	8–2	6–7	5–5	5–5	6–6	7–3	4–8	9–9
Chicago	6–4	6–4	5–7	—	8–5	9–3	5–7	7–5	8–4	6–3	7–5	6–4	5–5	5–5	12–6
Cleveland	6–3	4–5	6–6	5–8	—	6–7	5–7	5–8	5–5	6–6	7–2	8–2	6–4	8–4	13–5
Detroit	5–5	4–6	5–7	3–9	7–6	—	5–7	7–6	8–4	6–4	7–2	4–5	5–5	3–9	10–8
Kansas City	6–6	7–3	6–4	7–5	7–5	7–5	—	7–5	2–8	4–8	4–8	5–5	3–7	4–6	8–10
Minnesota	3–7	3–6	2–8	5–7	8–5	6–7	5–7	—	5–5	5–7	3–9	4–6	8–4	5–4	7–11
New York	5–5	7–5	7–6	4–8	5–5	4–8	8–2	5–5	—	6–3	4–6	6–6	10–2	5–7	11–6
Oakland	8–5	8–4	5–5	3–6	6–6	4–6	8–4	7–5	3–6	—	9–4	7–2	5–7	7–3	11–7
Seattle	8–5	7–3	5–5	5–7	2–7	2–7	8–4	9–3	6–4	4–9	—	9–3	7–5	8–2	11–7
Tampa Bay	6–6	5–8	6–6	4–6	2–8	5–4	5–5	6–4	6–6	2–7	3–9	—	5–7	5–7	9–9
Texas	5–7	6–6	3–7	5–5	4–6	5–5	7–3	4–8	2–10	7–5	5–7	7–5	—	4–6	7–11
Toronto	7–5	6–7	8–4	5–5	4–8	9–3	6–4	4–5	7–5	3–7	2–8	7–5	6–4	—	9–9

=== Notable transactions ===
- June 16, 2000: Mike Mohler was signed as a free agent with the Cleveland Indians.
- June 29, 2000: David Justice was traded by the Indians to the New York Yankees for Ricky Ledée, Jake Westbrook, and Zach Day.
- July 28, 2000: Ricky Ledée was traded by the Indians to the Texas Rangers for David Segui.
- July 28, 2000: Richie Sexson, Paul Rigdon, Kane Davis, and a player to be named later were traded by the Indians to the Milwaukee Brewers for Bob Wickman, Jason Bere and Steve Woodard. The Indians completed the deal by sending Marco Scutaro to the Brewers on August 30.

=== Roster ===
2000 Cleveland Indians
Roster
Pitchers: 46 Jason Bere; 50 Jamie Brewington; 50 Jim Brower; 34 Dave Burba; 62 Cam Cairncross; 40 Bartolo Colón; 60 Kane Davis; 56 Sean DePaula; 47 Tim Drew; 31 Chuck Finley; 48 Chris Haney; 30 Scott Kamieniecki; 20 Steve Karsay; 63 Andrew Lorraine; 36 Tom Martin; 71 Willie Martínez; 22 Mike Mohler; 41 Charles Nagy; 37 Jaime Navarro; 59 Alan Newman; 67 Chris Nichting; 39 Steve Reed; 46 Paul Rigdon; 73 Ricardo Rincón; 53 Paul Shuey; 32 Justin Speier; 59 Mark Watson; 26 Bob Wickman; 57 Brian Williams; 37 Bobby Witt; 29 Steve Woodard; 27 Jaret Wright	Catchers: 15 Sandy Alomar Jr.; 2 Einar Díaz; Infielders: 12 Roberto Alomar; 17 Travis Fryman; 72 John McDonald; 23 David Segui; 25 Jim Thome; 13 Omar Vizquel; 35 Enrique Wilson	Outfielders: 66 Russell Branyan; 6 Jolbert Cabrera; 1 Wil Cordero; 51 Jacob Cruz; 23 David Justice; 22,23 Ricky Ledée; 7 Kenny Lofton; 61 Chan Perry; 61 Alex Ramírez; 24 Manny Ramírez; 52 Dave Roberts; 60 Bill Selby; 44 Richie Sexson; 29 Mark Whiten	Manager: 32 Charlie Manuel; Coaches: 4 Luis Isaac (Bullpen); 28 Clarence Jones (Hitting); 9 Grady Little (Bench); 38 Dick Pole (Pitching); 16 Jim Riggleman (Third Base); 11 Ted Uhlaender (First Base); 43 Dan Williams (Bullpen Catcher)

== Game log ==
2000 Game Log
April

#	Date	Opponent	Score	Win	Loss	Save	Attendance	Record
1	April 3	@ Orioles	4–1	Colón (1–0)	Mussina (0–1)	Karsay (1)	46,902	1–0
2	April 5	@ Orioles	11–7	Ryan (1–0)	Kamieniecki (0–1)		33,833	1-1
3	April 6	@ Orioles	6–2	Rapp (1–0)	Nagy (0–1)	Groom (1)	35,181	1–2
4	April 7	@ Devil Rays	14–5	Wright (1–0)	Guzmán (0–1)		40,329	2-2
5	April 8	@ Devil Rays	6–4	Burba (1–0)	Trachsel (1-1)	Karsay (2)	30,177	3–2
6	April 9	@ Devil Rays	17–4	Colón (2–0)	Rupe (0–1)		21,357	4–2
7	April 10	@ Athletics	9–4	Kamieniecki (1-1)	Tam (0–1)		9,123	5–2
8	April 11	@ Athletics	5–1	Nagy (1-1)	Olivares (1-1)		8,638	6–2
9	April 12	@ Athletics	5–0	Wright (2–0)	Heredia (0–1)		14,683	7–2
10	April 14	Rangers	7–2	Helling (2–0)	Burba (1-1)		42,727	7–3
11	April 15	Rangers	6–4	Clark (2–0)	Colón (2–1)	Wetteland (1)	40,543	7–4
12	April 16	Rangers	2–1	Finley (1–0)	Wetteland (0–1)		40,626	8–4
13	April 18	Athletics	8–5	Mulder (1–0)	Nagy (1–2)	Isringhausen (3)	40,551	8–5
14	April 19	Athletics	10–5	Appier (3–1)	Wright (2–1)		40,531	8–6
15	April 20	Athletics	9–5	Burba (2–1)	Hudson (1–2)		42,134	9–6
16	April 24	@ Mariners	6–0	Finley (2–0)	Meche (0–2)		30,354	10–6
17	April 25	@ Mariners	8–5	Halama (2–0)	Nagy (1–3)		27,579	10–7
18	April 26	@ Mariners	5–3 (10)	Shuey (1–0)	Rhodes (1–2)		37,086	11–7
19	April 28	Red Sox	4–3	Burba (3–1)	Schourek (1–2)	Karsay (3)	42,885	12–7
20	April 29	Red Sox	3–2	Finley (3–0)	Martínez (1–2)	Karsay (4)	42,453	13–7
21	April 30	Red Sox	2–1	Martínez (5–0)	Nagy (1–4)	Lowe (5)	42,065	13–8

May

#	Date	Opponent	Score	Win	Loss	Save	Attendance	Record
22	May 1	Yankees	2–1	Mendoza (3–2)	Wright (2-2)	Rivera (8)	42,711	13–9
23	May 2	Yankees	4–2	Pettitte (1-1)	Witt (0–1)	Rivera (9)	42,801	13–10
24	May 3	Yankees	6–5	Grimsley (1–0)	Karsay (0–1)	Rivera (10)	42,837	13–11
25	May 4	@ Blue Jays	8–1	Wells (5–1)	Finley (3–1)		16,637	13–12
26	May 5	@ Blue Jays	11–10	Koch (2–0)	Shuey (1-1)		19,191	13-13
27	May 6	@ Blue Jays	8–6	Rincón (1–0)	Quantrill (0–1)	Karsay (5)	23,730	14–13
28	May 7	@ Blue Jays	10–8 (12)	Shuey (2–1)	Gunderson (0–1)	Karsay (6)	19,161	15–13
29	May 8	@ Twins	3–2 (10)	Rincón (2–0)	Wells (0–3)	Karsay (7)	7,309	16–13
30	May 9	@ Twins	6–5	Hawkins (1-1)	Finley (3–2)	Miller (1)	7,777	16–14
31	May 10	@ Twins	10–9	Guardado (3–1)	Karsay (0–2)		9,505	16–15
32	May 11	Royals	16–0	Wright (3–2)	Durbin (1–2)		41,905	17–15
33	May 12	Royals	7–3	Colón (3–1)	Batista (1-1)		42,801	18–15
34	May 13	Royals	7–6 (12)	Reed (1–0)	Reichert (1–2)		40,689	19–15
35	May 14	Royals	5–4	Suzuki (1–0)	Finley (3-3)	Spradlin (1)	40,530	19–16
36	May 16	Tigers	11–9	Nagy (2–4)	Nomo (1–3)	Karsay (8)	40,633	20–16
37	May 17	Tigers	7–2	Colón (4–1)	Nitkowski (2–7)		40,652	21–16
38	May 19	Yankees	11–7	Mendoza (4–2)	Kamieniecki (1–2)		42,642	21–17
39	May 20	Yankees	3–2	Shuey (3–1)	Nelson (6–1)		42,583	22–17
40	May 21	Yankees	6–1	Rigdon (1–0)	Hernández (4-4)		42,587	23–17
41	May 23	@ Tigers	10–4	Blair (2–0)	Colón (4–2)		27,039	23–18
42	May 24	@ Tigers	10–9	Patterson (2–0)	Watson (0–1)	Jones (13)	27,274	23–19
43	May 25	@ Tigers	4–1	Burba (4–1)	Moehler (1–3)	Karsay (9)	30,103	24–19
44	May 26	@ White Sox	5–3	Eldred (5–2)	Finley (3–4)	Foulke (8)	18,225	24–20
45	May 27	@ White Sox	14–3	Parque (4–2)	Wright (3-3)		30,250	24–21
46	May 28	@ White Sox	12–3	Colón (5–2)	Wells (3–4)		24,192	25–21
47	May 29	Angels	3–2 (10)	Hasegawa (4–0)	Karsay (0–3)	Percival (15)	42,888	25–22
48	May 30	Angels	6–1	Burba (5–1)	Schoeneweis (5–3)		42,910	26–22
49	May 31	Angels	7–3	Finley (4-4)	Etherton (0–1)	Karsay (10)	41,637	27–22

June

#	Date	Opponent	Score	Win	Loss	Save	Attendance	Record
50	June 2	@ Cardinals	5–1	Kile (8–3)	Wright (3–4)		41,685	27–23
51	June 3	@ Cardinals	4–2	Colón (6–2)	Stephenson (8–1)	Karsay (11)	48,252	28–23
52	June 4	@ Cardinals	3–2	Martin (1–0)	Morris (0–1)	Karsay (12)	44,594	29–23
53	June 5	@ Brewers	8–4	Burba (6–1)	D'Amico (2–4)		13,749	30–23
54	June 6	@ Brewers	4–2	Finley (5–4)	Snyder (0–2)		24,595	31–23
55	June 7	@ Brewers	9–5	Brewington (1–0)	Bere (3–5)		15,518	32–23
56	June 8	@ Red Sox	3–0	Martínez (9–2)	Colón (6–3)	Lowe (13)	31,438	32–24
57	June 9	Reds	7–4	Brower (1–0)	Neagle (5–1)	Karsay (13)	43,105	33–24
58	June 10	Reds	6–5	Burba (7–1)	Parris (2–9)	Karsay (14)	43,084	34–24
59	June 11	Reds	7–5 (13)	Aybar (1–2)	Kamieniecki (1–3)		43,036	34–25
60	June 12	White Sox	8–7	Eldred (7–2)	Rigdon (1-1)	Foulke (15)	43,229	34–26
61	June 13	White Sox	4–3 (10)	Simas (1-1)	Speier (0–1)	Howry (2)	43,233	34–27
62	June 14	White Sox	11–4	Beirne (1–0)	Brower (1-1)		43,284	34–28
63	June 16	@ Tigers	5–2	Moehler (4–3)	Burba (7–2)	Jones (19)	39,072	34–29
64	June 17	@ Tigers	8–6	Brocail (3-3)	Karsay (0–4)		39,569	34–30
65	June 18	@ Tigers	9–4	Speier (1-1)	Patterson (2–1)		39,123	35–30
66	June 19	@ White Sox	6–1	Wells (4–5)	Colón (6–4)		43,062	35–31
67	June 20	@ White Sox	4–1	Brower (2–1)	Sirotka (6-6)	Karsay (15)	20,005	36–31
68	June 21	@ White Sox	8–6	Burba (8–2)	Baldwin (10–2)	Karsay (16)	23,516	37–31
69	June 22	@ White Sox	6–0	Eldred (9–2)	Finley (5-5)		23,374	37–32
70	June 23	Tigers	7–6	Blair (4–1)	Navarro (0–1)	Jones (20)	43,095	37–33
71	June 24	Tigers	8–1	Colón (7–4)	Sparks (0–1)		43,081	38–33
72	June 24	Tigers	14–8	Nitkowski (4–7)	Mohler (0–1)		43,083	38–34
73	June 25	Tigers	2–1	Karsay (1–4)	Anderson (3–1)		43,062	39–34
74	June 26	Tigers	13–2	Moehler (5–4)	Burba (8–3)		43,191	39–35
75	June 27	@ Royals	12–1	Finley (6–5)	Suzuki (3–2)		16,908	40–35
76	June 28	@ Royals	8–1	Witasick (2–7)	Davis (0–1)		19,522	40–36
77	June 29	@ Royals	6–1	Durbin (2–3)	Colón (7–5)		25,295	40–37
78	June 30	Twins	7–2	Redman (5–3)	Brower (2-2)	Hawkins (3)	43,124	40–38

July

#	Date	Opponent	Score	Win	Loss	Save	Attendance	Record
79	July 1	Twins	4–3 (10)	Guardado (4–2)	Karsay (1–5)	Wells (6)	43,185	40–39
80	July 2	Twins	7–1	Finley (7–5)	Mays (4–10)		43,181	41–39
81	July 4	Blue Jays	9–4	Colón (8–5)	Frascatore (1–3)		43,222	42–39
82	July 5	Blue Jays	15–7	Brewington (2–0)	Quantrill (0–4)		43,141	43–39
83	July 6	Blue Jays	9–6	Carpenter (7-7)	Burba (8–4)	Koch (19)	43,237	43–40
84	July 7	@ Reds	2–1	Neagle (8–2)	Finley (7–6)	Graves (14)	53,509	43–41
85	July 8	@ Reds	14–5	Parris (5–11)	Davis (0–2)		54,335	43–42
86	July 9	@ Reds	5–3	Colón (9–5)	Williamson (2–6)	Karsay (17)	51,181	44–42
87	July 13	Pirates	4–3 (10)	Karsay (2–5)	Sauerbeck (3–1)		43,225	45–42
88	July 14	Pirates	9–3	Finley (8–6)	Benson (8–7)		43,046	46–42
89	July 15	Pirates	6–4	Brewington (3–0)	Silva (5–4)	Karsay (18)	43,049	47–42
90	July 16	Astros	5–1	Elarton (9–3)	Colón (9–6)		43,031	47–43
91	July 17	Astros	8–6	Drew (1–0)	Miller (0–2)	Karsay (19)	43,081	48–43
92	July 18	Astros	8–2	Burba (9–4)	Reynolds (6–7)		43,135	49–43
93	July 19	Royals	10–5	Suzuki (5–4)	Finley (8–7)		43,248	49–44
94	July 20	Royals	10–6	Suppan (4–6)	Brower (2–3)		43,222	49–45
95	July 21	@ Twins	2–1	Redman (8–4)	Colón (9–7)	Hawkins (7)	19,231	49–46
96	July 22	@ Twins	10–6	Santana (2-2)	Davis (0–3)	Wells (7)	14,108	49–47
97	July 23	@ Twins	8–3	Burba (10–4)	Radke (7–11)		13,623	50–47
98	July 25	@ Blue Jays	10–3	Finley (10–7)	Escobar (7–10)		28,672	51–47
99	July 26	@ Blue Jays	8–1	Wells (16–3)	Colón (9–8)		31,183	51–48
100	July 29	@ Orioles	14–3	Bere (1–0)	Rapp (6–7)		47,715	52–48
101	July 29	@ Orioles	4–0	Mercedes (6–4)	Woodard (0–1)		47,355	52–49
102	July 30	@ Orioles	10–7	Parrish (1-1)	Finley (9–8)		47,065	52–50

August

#	Date	Opponent	Score	Win	Loss	Save	Attendance	Record
103	August 1	@ Devil Rays	6–5	Creek (1-1)	Wickman (0–1)		24,481	52–51
104	August 2	@ Devil Rays	5–3	Karsay (3–5)	Creek (1–2)	Wickman (1)	16,909	53–51
105	August 3	@ Devil Rays	5–1	Bere (2–0)	Lopez (8-8)		21,703	54–51
106	August 4	Angels	11–10	Wickman (1-1)	Percival (4–5)		43,182	55–51
107	August 5	Angels	6–3	Speier (2–1)	Schoeneweis (5–6)		43,162	56–51
108	August 6	Angels	5–2	Colón (10–8)	Cooper (4–7)	Wickman (2)	43,133	57–51
109	August 7	Rangers	2–0	Reed (2–0)	Helling (13–8)	Wickman (3)	43,258	58–51
110	August 8	Rangers	11–2	Rogers (11–9)	Bere (2–1)		43,238	58–52
111	August 9	Rangers	6–4	Speier (3–1)	Perisho (2–4)	Wickman (4)	43,333	59–52
112	August 11	@ Mariners	7–1	Abbott (8–4)	Finley (9-9)	Paniagua (3)	45,335	59–53
113	August 12	@ Mariners	5–4	Colón (11–8)	Halama (10–6)	Wickman (5)	45,356	60–53
114	August 13	@ Mariners	10–4	Speier (4–1)	García (4–3)		45,380	61–53
115	August 14	@ Athletics	8–1	Appier (11–9)	Bere (2-2)		12,799	61–54
116	August 15	@ Athletics	5–3	Mulder (7–8)	Burba (10–5)	Isringhausen (26)	18,691	61–55
117	August 16	@ Athletics	7–6	Jones (3–1)	Wickman (1–2)		32,376	61–56
118	August 18	Mariners	9–8	Karsay (4–5)	Rhodes (3–6)		43,126	62–56
119	August 19	Mariners	10–4	Bere (3–2)	Moyer (11–7)		43,187	63–56
120	August 20	Mariners	12–4	Burba (11–5)	Sele (13–8)		43,144	64–56
121	August 22	Athletics	14–6	Finley (10–9)	Heredia (13–9)		43,299	65–56
122	August 23	Athletics	7–5	Shuey (4–1)	Hudson (13–6)	Wickman (6)	43,231	66–56
123	August 24	Athletics	11–7	Zito (2-2)	Woodard (0–2)	Mecir (2)	43,276	66–57
124	August 25	@ Angels	4–1	Wise (3–1)	Burba (11–6)	Hasegawa (7)	41,452	66–58
125	August 26	@ Angels	9–5	Bere (4–2)	Schoeneweis (6–7)		37,697	67–58
126	August 27	@ Angels	10–9	Levine (3–4)	Finley (10-10)	Hasegawa (8)	31,504	67–59
127	August 28	@ Rangers	5–2	Colón (12–8)	Rogers (11–12)	Wickman (7)	22,134	68–59
128	August 29	@ Rangers	12–1	Woodard (1–2)	Glynn (3-3)		22,389	69–59
129	August 30	@ Rangers	5–3	Burba (12–6)	Davis (5-5)	Wickman (8)	24,215	70–59
130	August 31	@ Rangers	14–7	Venafro (3–1)	Karsay (4–6)		27,333	70–60

September

#	Date	Opponent	Score	Win	Loss	Save	Attendance	Record
131	September 1	Orioles	5–2	Finley (11–10)	Ponson (7–10)	Wickman (9)	42,647	71–60
132	September 2	Orioles	8–6	Rapp (7–10)	Karsay (4–7)	Kohlmeier (8)	42,736	71–61
133	September 3	Orioles	12–11 (13)	Cairncross (1–0)	Trombley (4–5)		42,630	72–61
134	September 4	Devil Rays	5–1	Burba (13–6)	Lopez (11–10)		42,628	73–61
135	September 5	Devil Rays	7–4	Bere (5–2)	Fiore (1-1)	Wickman (10)	42,660	74–61
136	September 6	Devil Rays	6–2	Finley (12–10)	Harper (0–1)		42,742	75–61
137	September 7	Devil Rays	4–3	Rekar (6–9)	Karsay (4–8)	Hernández (29)	42,709	75–62
138	September 8	White Sox	5–4	Buehrle (4–1)	Woodard (1–3)	Foulke (29)	42,526	75–63
139	September 9	White Sox	9–3	Burba (14–6)	Garland (3–6)		42,561	76–63
140	September 12	Red Sox	8–6	Martinez (10–6)	Finley (12–11)	Lowe (33)	42,714	76–64
141	September 13	Red Sox	10–3	Colón (13–8)	Ohka (3–5)		42,667	77–64
142	September 14	Red Sox	7–4	Martínez (17–5)	Nagy (2–5)	Lowe (34)	42,709	77–65
143	September 15	@ Yankees	11–1	Burba (15–6)	Cone (4–12)		48,443	78–65
144	September 16	@ Yankees	6–3	Hernández (12–11)	Bere (5–3)		55,097	78–66
145	September 17	@ Yankees	15–4	Finley (13–11)	Neagle (7–5)		50,174	79–66
146	September 18	@ Yankees	2–0	Colón (14–8)	Clemens (13–7)		31,317	80–66
147	September 19	@ Red Sox	7–4	Beck (2–0)	Nagy (2–6)	Lowe (37)	32,512	80–67
148	September 20	@ Red Sox	2–1	Woodard (2–3)	Martínez (17–6)	Wickman (11)	33,002	81–67
149	September 20	@ Red Sox	5–4	Karsay (5–8)	Cormier (2–3)	Wickman (12)	32,751	82–67
150	September 21	@ Red Sox	9–8	Ontiveros (1-1)	Speier (4–2)	Lowe (38)	31,404	82–68
151	September 21	@ Red Sox	8–5	Finley (14–11)	Wakefield (6–10)		32,743	83–68
152	September 22	@ Royals	3–2	Bottalico (8–6)	Karsay (5–9)		15,036	83–69
153	September 23	@ Royals	11–1	Colón (15–8)	Reichert (8–9)		20,253	84–69
154	September 24	@ Royals	9–0	Stein (8–4)	Nagy (2–7)		12,606	84–70
155	September 25	White Sox	9–2	Burba (16–6)	Garland (4–8)		42,500	85–70
156	September 25	Twins	4–3	Miller (2–3)	Shuey (4–2)	Hawkins (13)	42,853	85–71
157	September 26	Twins	4–2	Finley (15–11)	Romero (2–7)	Wickman (13)	42,773	86–71
158	September 27	Twins	8–2	Bere (6–3)	Radke (12–16)		42,864	87–71
159	September 28	Twins	4–3 (10)	Guardado (7–3)	Wickman (1–3)	Hawkins (14)	42,821	87–72
160	September 29	Blue Jays	8–4	Speier (5–2)	Trachsel (8–15)	Karsay (20)	42,768	88–72
161	September 30	Blue Jays	6–5	Finley (16–11)	Loaiza (10–13)	Wickman (14)	42,676	89–72

October

#	Date	Opponent	Score	Win	Loss	Save	Attendance	Record
162	October 1	Blue Jays	11–4	Woodard (3-3)	Wells (20–8)		42,594	90–72

== Player stats ==
=== Batting ===
==== Starters by position ====
Note: Pos = Position; G = Games played; AB = At bats; R = Runs scored; H = Hits; 2B = Doubles; 3B = Triples; HR = Home runs; RBI = Runs batted in; AVG = Batting average; SB = Stolen bases

Pos	Player	G	AB	R	H	2B	3B	HR	RBI	AVG	SB
C	Sandy Alomar Jr.	97	356	44	103	16	2	7	42	.289	2
1B	Jim Thome	158	557	106	150	33	1	37	106	.269	1
2B	Roberto Alomar	155	610	111	189	40	2	19	89	.310	39
3B	Travis Fryman	155	574	93	184	38	4	22	106	.321	1
SS	Omar Vizquel	156	613	101	176	27	3	7	66	.287	22
LF	Richie Sexson	91	324	45	83	16	1	16	44	.256	1
CF	Kenny Lofton	137	543	107	151	23	5	15	73	.278	30
RF	Manny Ramirez	118	439	92	154	34	2	38	122	.351	1
DH	Russell Branyan	67	193	32	46	7	2	16	38	.238	0

==== Other batters ====
Note: G = Games played; AB = At bats; R = Runs scored; H = Hits; 2B = Doubles; 3B = Triples; HR = Home runs; RBI = Runs batted in; AVG = Batting average; SB = Stolen bases

Player	G	AB	R	H	2B	3B	HR	RBI	AVG	SB
Jolbert Cabrera	100	175	27	44	3	1	2	15	.251	6
Wil Cordero	38	148	18	39	11	2	0	17	.264	0
Jacob Cruz	11	29	3	7	3	0	0	5	.241	1
Einar Díaz	75	250	29	68	14	2	4	25	.272	4
David Justice	68	249	46	66	14	1	21	58	.265	1
Ricky Ledée	17	63	13	14	2	1	2	8	.222	0
John McDonald	9	9	0	4	0	0	0	0	.444	0
Chan Perry	13	14	1	1	0	0	0	0	.071	0
Alex Ramírez	41	112	13	32	5	1	5	12	.286	1
Dave Roberts	19	10	1	2	0	0	0	0	.200	1
David Segui	57	223	41	74	13	0	8	46	.332	0
Bill Selby	30	46	8	11	1	0	0	4	.239	0
Mark Whiten	6	7	2	2	1	0	0	1	.286	0
Enrique Wilson	40	117	16	38	9	0	2	12	.325	2

Note: Pitchers' batting statistics are not included above.

=== Pitching ===
==== Starting pitchers ====
Note: W = Wins; L = Losses; ERA = Earned run average; G = Games pitched; GS = Games started; IP = Innings pitched; H = Hits allowed; R = Runs allowed, ER = Earned runs allowed; BB = Walks allowed; K = Strikeouts

Player	W	L	ERA	G	GS	IP	H	R	ER	BB	K
Chuck Finley	16	11	4.17	34	34	218.0	211	108	101	101	189
Dave Burba	16	6	4.47	32	32	191.1	199	99	95	91	180
Bartolo Colón	15	8	3.88	30	30	188.0	163	86	81	98	212
Charles Nagy	2	7	8.21	11	11	57.0	71	53	52	21	41
Jason Bere	6	3	6.63	11	11	54.1	65	41	40	26	44
Steve Woodard	3	3	5.67	13	11	54.0	57	35	34	11	35
Jaret Wright	3	4	4.70	9	9	51.2	44	27	27	28	36
Tim Drew	1	0	10.00	3	3	9.0	17	12	10	8	5

==== Other pitchers ====
Note: W = Wins; L = Losses; ERA = Earned run average; G = Games pitched; GS = Games started; SV = Saves; IP = Innings pitched; H = Hits allowed; R = Runs allowed; ER = Earned runs allowed; BB = Walks allowed; K = Strikeouts

Player	W	L	ERA	G	GS	SV	IP	H	R	ER	BB	K
Jim Brower	2	3	6.24	17	11	0	62.0	80	45	43	31	32
Paul Rigdon	1	1	7.64	5	4	0	17.2	21	15	15	9	15
Bobby Witt	0	1	7.63	7	2	0	15.1	28	13	13	6	6
Jaime Navarro	0	1	7.98	7	2	0	14.2	20	13	13	5	9
Kane Davis	0	3	14.73	5	2	0	11.0	20	21	18	8	2

==== Relief pitchers ====
Note: W = Wins; L = Losses; ERA = Earned run average; G = Games pitched; SV = Saves; IP = Innings pitched; H = Hits allowed; R = Runs allowed; ER = Earned runs allowed; BB = Walks allowed; K = Strikeouts

Player	W	L	ERA	G	SV	IP	H	R	ER	BB	K
Steve Karsay	5	9	3.76	72	20	76.2	79	33	32	25	66
Steve Reed	2	0	4.34	57	0	56.0	58	30	27	21	39
Paul Shuey	4	2	3.39	57	0	63.2	51	25	24	30	69
Justin Speier	5	2	3.29	47	0	68.1	57	27	25	28	69
Ricardo Rincón	2	0	2.70	35	0	20.0	17	7	6	13	20
Jamie Brewington	3	0	5.36	26	0	45.1	56	28	27	19	34
Scott Kamieniecki	1	3	5.67	26	0	33.1	42	22	21	20	29
Tom Martin	1	0	4.05	31	0	33.1	32	16	15	15	21
Bob Wickman	1	3	3.38	26	14	26.2	27	12	10	12	11
Brian Williams	0	0	4.00	7	0	18.0	23	9	8	8	6
Sean DePaula	0	0	5.94	13	0	16.2	20	11	11	14	16
Andrew Lorraine	0	0	3.86	10	0	9.1	8	4	4	5	5
Cam Cairncross	1	0	3.86	15	0	9.1	11	4	4	3	8
Chris Nichting	0	0	7.00	7	0	9.0	13	7	7	5	7
Mark Watson	0	1	8.53	6	0	6.1	12	7	6	2	4
Willie Martínez	0	0	3.00	1	0	3.0	1	1	1	1	1
Alan Newman	0	0	20.25	1	0	1.1	6	3	3	1	0
Chris Haney	0	0	9.00	1	0	1.0	1	1	1	1	0
Mike Mohler	0	1	9.00	2	0	1.0	1	1	1	0	2

== Award winners ==
All-Star Game

== Minor league affiliates ==
Classification level	Team	League
AAA	Buffalo Bisons	International League
AA	Akron Aeros	Eastern League
Advanced A	Kinston Indians	Carolina League
A	Columbus RedStixx	South Atlantic League
Short Season A	Mahoning Valley Scrappers	New York–Penn League
Rookie	Burlington Indians	Appalachian League
