= 2000 Milwaukee Brewers season =

2000 Milwaukee Brewers
- League: National League
- Division: Central
- Ballpark: Milwaukee County Stadium
- City: Milwaukee, Wisconsin, United States
- Record: 73–89 (.451)
- Divisional place: 3rd
- Owners: Bud Selig
- General managers: Dean Taylor
- Managers: Davey Lopes
- Television: WCGV-TV; Midwest SC (Matt Vasgersian, Bill Schroeder, Len Kasper)
- Radio: WTMJ (AM) (Bob Uecker, Jim Powell, Len Kasper)

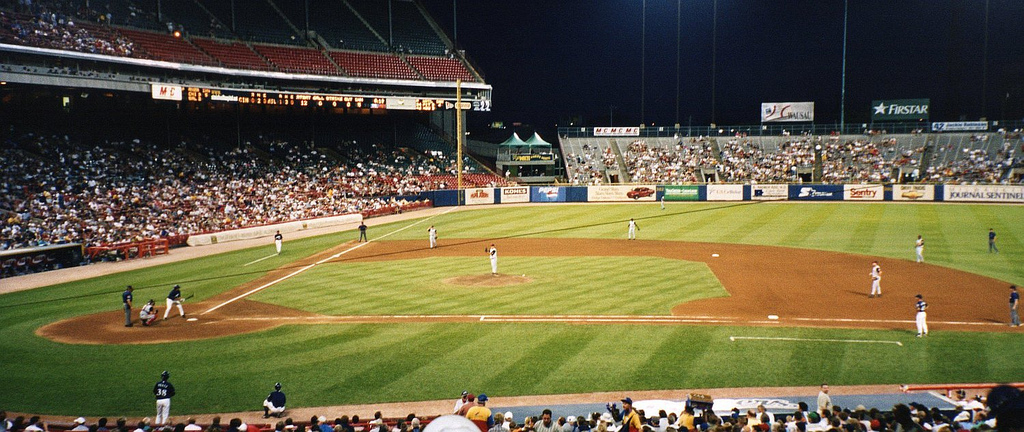
The Brewers playing host to the Cincinnati Reds during an August 2000 game at Milwaukee County Stadium.

The 2000 Milwaukee Brewers season was the 31st season for the Brewers in Milwaukee, their 3rd in the National League, and their 32nd overall. The Brewers finished third in the National League Central with a record of 73 wins and 89 losses, once again failing to improve their record by one game from the season prior and were eliminated from postseason contention for the 18th consecutive season.

== Offseason ==
- November 19, 1999: Jason Bere was signed as a free agent by the Brewers.
- December 13, 1999: Matt Williams was drafted by the Brewers from the New York Yankees in the rule 5 draft. Williams was returned to the Yankees on May 3.
- January 14, 2000: Alex Ochoa was traded by the Brewers to the Cincinnati Reds for Mark Sweeney and a player to be named later. The Reds completed the deal by sending Gene Altman (minors) to the Brewers on May 15.
- January 21, 2000: Bill Pulsipher was traded by the Brewers to the New York Mets for Luis López.

== Regular season ==
=== Opening Day starters ===
- Kevin Barker
- Ronnie Belliard
- Henry Blanco
- Jeromy Burnitz
- Marquis Grissom
- Jimmy Haynes
- José Hernández
- Geoff Jenkins
- Mark Loretta

=== Season standings ===
NL Central
Team	W	L	Pct.	GB	Home	Road
St. Louis Cardinals	95	67	.586	—	50‍–‍31	45‍–‍36
Cincinnati Reds	85	77	.525	10	43‍–‍38	42‍–‍39
Milwaukee Brewers	73	89	.451	22	42‍–‍39	31‍–‍50
Houston Astros	72	90	.444	23	39‍–‍42	33‍–‍48
Pittsburgh Pirates	69	93	.426	26	37‍–‍44	32‍–‍49
Chicago Cubs	65	97	.401	30	38‍–‍43	27‍–‍54

=== Record vs. opponents ===
2000 National League record Source: NL Standings Head-to-Head
Team	AZ	ATL	CHC	CIN	COL	FLA	HOU	LAD	MIL	MON	NYM	PHI	PIT	SD	SF	STL	AL
Arizona	—	3–6	5–4	2–5	7–6	4–5	6–1	7–6	4–5	4–5	2–7	8–1	7–2	9–4	6–7	5–4	6–9
Atlanta	6–3	—	4–5	2–5	5–4	6–6	5–4	7–2	6–3	6–7	7–6	8–5	5–2	8–1	6–3	3–4	11–7
Chicago	4–5	5–4	—	4–8	4–5	1–6	5–7	3–6	6–7	4–5	2–5	6–3	3–9	3–5	4–5	3–10	8–7
Cincinnati	5–2	5–2	8–4	—	6–3	3–6	7–5	4–5	5–8–1	6–3	5–4	3–4	7–6	4–5	3–6	7–6	7–8
Colorado	6–7	4–5	5–4	3–6	—	4–5	5–4	4–9	4–5	7–2	3–6	6–3	7–2	7–6	6–7	5–3	6–6
Florida	5–4	6–6	6–1	6–3	5–4	—	3–5	2–7	3–4	7–6	6–6	9–4	5–4	2–7	3–6	3–6	8–9
Houston	1–6	4–5	7–5	5–7	4–5	5–3	—	3–6	7–6	4–5	2–5	5–4	10–3	2–7	1–8	6–6	6–9
Los Angeles	6–7	2–7	6–3	5–4	9–4	7–2	6–3	—	3–4	5–3	4–5	5–4	4–5	8–5	7–5	3–6	6–9
Milwaukee	5–4	3–6	7–6	8–5–1	5–4	4–3	6–7	4–3	—	4–5	2–7	2–5	7–5	2–7	3–6	5–7	6–9
Montreal	5–4	7–6	5–4	3–6	2–7	6–7	5–4	3–5	5–4	—	3–9	5–7	3–4	3–6	3–6	2–5	7–11
New York	7–2	6–7	5–2	4–5	6–3	6–6	5–2	5–4	7–2	9–3	—	6–7	7–2	3–6	3–5	6–3	9–9
Philadelphia	1–8	5–8	3–6	4–3	3–6	4–9	4–5	4–5	5–2	7–5	7–6	—	3–6	2–5	2–7	2–7	9–9
Pittsburgh	2–7	2–5	9–3	6–7	2–7	4–5	3–10	5–4	5–7	4–3	2–7	6–3	—	7–2	2–6	4–8	6–9
San Diego	4–9	1–8	5–3	5–4	6–7	7–2	7–2	5–8	7–2	6–3	6–3	5–2	2–7	—	5–7	0–9	5–10
San Francisco	7–6	3–6	5–4	6–3	7–6	6–3	8–1	5–7	6–3	6–3	5–3	7–2	6–2	7–5	—	5–4	8–7
St. Louis	4–5	4–3	10–3	6–7	3–5	6–3	6–6	6–3	7–5	5–2	3–6	7–2	8–4	9–0	4–5	—	7–8

=== Notable transactions ===
- March 22, 2000: Charlie Hayes was signed as a free agent by the Brewers.
- June 2, 2000: Héctor Ramírez was released by the Brewers.
- July 28, 2000: Bob Wickman, Jason Bere and Steve Woodard were traded by the Brewers to the Cleveland Indians for Paul Rigdon, Richie Sexson, Kane Davis and a player to be named later. The Indians completed the deal by sending Marco Scutaro to the Brewers on August 30.

=== Roster ===
2000 Milwaukee Brewers
Roster
Pitchers: 53 Juan Acevedo; 47 Jason Bere; 88 Jim Bruske; 47 Mike Buddie; 13 Jeff D'Amico; 37 Kane Davis; 28 Valerio de los Santos; 48 Horacio Estrada; 51 Jimmy Haynes; 46 Ray King; 39 Curtis Leskanic; 58 Allen Levrault; 38 Jaime Navarro; 54 Héctor Ramírez; 31 Paul Rigdon; 52 Rafael Roque; 50 Bob Scanlan; 59 John Snyder; 31 Everett Stull; 49 David Weathers; 27 Bob Wickman; 41 Matt Williams; 37 Steve Woodard; 38 Jamey Wright	Catchers: 12 Henry Blanco; 27 Kevin Brown; 25 Raul Casanova; Infielders: 22 Kevin Barker; 10 Ronnie Belliard; 7 Sean Berry; 38,39 Angel Echevarria; 14 Charlie Hayes; 18 José Hernández; 2 Tyler Houston; 1 Luis López; 8 Mark Loretta; 57 Santiago Pérez; 11 Richie Sexson	Outfielders: 20 Jeromy Burnitz; 16 Lou Collier; 9 Marquis Grissom; 5 Geoff Jenkins; 38,39 Chris Jones; 24 James Mouton; 33 Lyle Mouton; 23 Mark Sweeney	Manager: 30 Davey Lopes; Coaches: 45 Gary Allenson (first base); 36 Bob Apodaca (pitching); 29 Rod Carew (hitting); 35 Bill Castro (bullpen); 3 Jerry Royster (bench); 43 Chris Speier (third base)

== Player stats ==
=== Batting ===
==== Starters by position ====
Note: Pos = Position; G = Games played; AB = At bats; H = Hits; Avg. = Batting average; HR = Home runs; RBI = Runs batted in

Pos	Player	G	AB	H	Avg.	HR	RBI
C	Henry Blanco	93	284	67	.236	7	31
1B	Richie Sexson	57	213	63	.296	14	47
2B	Ronnie Belliard	152	571	150	.263	8	54
SS	Mark Loretta	91	352	99	.281	7	40
3B	José Hernández	124	446	109	.244	11	59
LF	Geoff Jenkins	135	512	155	.303	34	94
CF	Marquis Grissom	146	595	145	.244	14	62
RF	Jeromy Burnitz	161	564	131	.232	31	98

==== Other batters ====
Note: G = Games played; AB = At bats; H = Hits; Avg. = Batting average; HR = Home runs; RBI = Runs batted in

Player	G	AB	H	Avg.	HR	RBI
Charlie Hayes	121	370	93	.251	9	46
Tyler Houston	101	284	71	.250	18	43
Raúl Casanova	86	231	57	.247	6	36
Luis López	78	201	53	.264	6	27
James Mouton	87	159	37	.233	2	17
Kevin Barker	40	100	22	.220	2	9
Lyle Mouton	42	97	27	.278	2	16
Mark Sweeney	71	73	16	.219	1	6
Santiago Pérez	24	52	9	.173	0	2
Sean Berry	32	46	7	.152	1	2
Angel Echevarria	31	42	9	.214	1	4
Lou Collier	14	32	7	.219	1	2
Kevin Brown	5	17	4	.235	0	1
Chris Jones	12	16	3	.188	0	1

=== Pitching ===
==== Starting pitchers ====
Note: G = Games pitched; IP = Innings pitched; W = Wins; L = Losses; ERA = Earned run average; SO = Strikeouts

Player	G	IP	W	L	ERA	SO
Jimmy Haynes	33	199.1	12	13	5.33	88
Jamey Wright	26	164.2	7	9	4.10	96
Jeff D'Amico	23	162.1	12	7	2.66	101
John Snyder	23	127.0	3	10	6.17	69
Jason Bere	20	115.0	6	7	4.93	98
Paul Rigdon	12	69.2	4	4	4.52	48
Jaime Navarro	5	18.2	0	5	12.54	7

==== Other pitchers ====
Note: G = Games pitched; IP = Innings pitched; W = Wins; L = Losses; ERA = Earned run average; SO = Strikeouts

Player	G	IP	W	L	ERA	SO
Steve Woodard	27	93.2	1	7	5.96	65
Everett Stull	20	43.1	2	3	5.82	33
Horacio Estrada	7	24.1	3	0	6.29	13
Allen Levrault	5	12.0	0	1	4.50	9

==== Relief pitchers ====
Note: G = Games pitched; W = Wins; L = Losses; SV = Saves; ERA = Earned run average; SO = Strikeouts

Player	G	W	L	SV	ERA	SO
Bob Wickman	43	2	2	16	2.93	44
Curt Leskanic	73	9	3	12	2.56	75
David Weathers	69	3	5	1	3.07	50
Valerio De Los Santos	66	2	3	0	5.13	70
Juan Acevedo	62	3	7	0	3.81	51
Ray King	36	3	2	0	1.26	19
Jim Bruske	15	1	0	0	6.48	8
Matt Williams	11	0	0	0	7.00	7
Héctor Ramírez	6	0	1	0	10.00	4
Mike Buddie	5	0	0	0	4.50	5
Rafael Roque	4	0	0	0	10.13	4
Kane Davis	3	0	0	0	6.75	2
Bob Scanlan	2	0	0	0	27.00	1

== Farm system ==
The Brewers' farm system consisted of eight minor league affiliates in 2000. The Brewers operated a Venezuelan Summer League team as a co-op with the Boston Red Sox and Minnesota Twins. The Indianapolis Indians won the International League championship.

Level	Team	League	Manager
Triple-A	Indianapolis Indians	International League	Steve Smith
Double-A	Huntsville Stars	Southern League	Carlos Lezcano
Class A-Advanced	Mudville Nine	California League	Barry Moss, Lonnie Keeter, and Frank Kremblas
Class A	Beloit Snappers	Midwest League	Don Money
Rookie	Helena Brewers	Pioneer League	Dan Norman
Rookie	Ogden Raptors	Pioneer League	Ed Sedar
Rookie	DSL Brewers	Dominican Summer League	—
Rookie	VSL San Joaquín	Venezuelan Summer League	—
