= Jason Bere =

American baseball player (born 1971)

- Pitcher
- Born: May 26, 1971 (age 53); Cambridge, Massachusetts, U.S.
- Batted: Right Threw: Right

MLB debut
- May 27, 1993, for the Chicago White Sox

Last MLB appearance
- May 27, 2003, for the Cleveland Indians

MLB statistics
- Win–loss record: 71–65
- Earned run average: 5.14
- Strikeouts: 920
- Stats at Baseball Reference

Teams
- Chicago White Sox (1993–1998); Cincinnati Reds (1998–1999); Milwaukee Brewers (1999–2000); Cleveland Indians (2000); Chicago Cubs (2001–2002); Cleveland Indians (2003)

Career highlights and awards
- All-Star (1994)

Jason Phillip Bere (born May 26, 1971) is an American former professional baseball pitcher and bullpen coach. He played in Major League Baseball for parts of 11 seasons from 1993 to 2003, for the Chicago White Sox, Cincinnati Reds, Milwaukee Brewers, Chicago Cubs, and Cleveland Indians. He was elected to the 1994 MLB All-Star Game, but injuries limited his playing career. Bere was the Indians' bullpen coach from 2015 to 2017.

== Early life ==
Bere was raised in Wilmington, Massachusetts and attended Wilmington High School and Middlesex Community College. Scouts of the Chicago White Sox saw Bere pitch, and as a result, they selected him in the 36th round of the 1990 Major League Baseball (MLB) Draft.

== Professional career ==
Bere signed with the White Sox, receiving a $2,000 signing bonus. In 1993, Baseball America rated Bere as the eighth-best prospect in baseball. He made his MLB debut in 1993, pitching to a 12–5 win–loss record and a 3.47 earned run average (ERA). He won his final seven games started, helping the White Sox win the American League (AL) West Division championship. He finished second in AL Rookie of the Year Award voting, behind Tim Salmon. He was elected to represent the AL in the 1994 MLB All-Star Game. He finished the year with a 12–2 win–loss record, leading the AL with a .857 winning percentage.

In 1995, Bere began experiencing tendinitis in the elbow of his throwing arm. He had an 8–15 win–loss record and a 7.19 ERA. He led the AL in losses. His injury necessitated Tommy John surgery, which was performed in September 1996. He returned to the White Sox in August 1997, following the White Flag trade that saw the White Sox trade away pitchers Wilson Álvarez, Roberto Hernández, and Danny Darwin, leaving them in need of more pitchers. Bere later acknowledged he returned to pitching too soon. The White Sox released Bere in 1998, and he signed with the Cincinnati Reds. After the 1999 season, Bere signed with the Milwaukee Brewers.

In July 2000, the Brewers traded Bere, Bob Wickman, and Steve Woodard to the Cleveland Indians for Richie Sexson, Paul Rigdon, Kane Davis, and a player to be named later (Marco Scutaro). He ended the season with a 12–10 record in 31 games started, a career high. A free agent after the 2000 season, Bere signed with the Chicago Cubs for 2001. He had a 1–10 record for the Cubs in 2002, and signed with the Cleveland Indians for the 2003 season. He experienced pain in his right shoulder in 2005, while pitching for the Buffalo Bisons of the Class AAA International League, leading him to retire.

== Coaching career ==
The Indians named Bere a special assistant in baseball operations in 2006. In January 2015, the Indians chose Bere as their new bullpen coach, succeeding Kevin Cash.

Bere was released by the Indians following the 2017 season.

== Personal life ==
Bere and his high school sweetheart, Dinelle (née Erwin), were married in November 1994. The couple live in North Andover, Massachusetts, and have two children.

Sporting positions
Preceded by Kevin Cash	Cleveland Indians bullpen coach 2015 – 2017	Succeeded by Scott Atchison
