= Kane Davis =

American baseball player (born 1975)

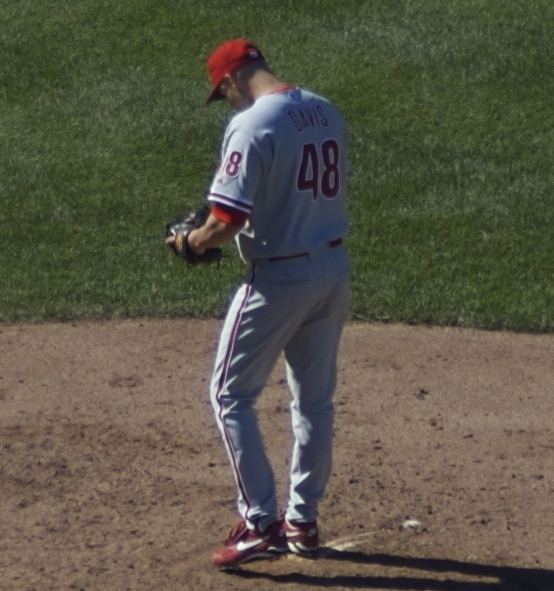
- Davis with the Philadelphia Phillies in 2007
- Pitcher
- Born: June 25, 1975 (age 51); Ripley, West Virginia, U.S.
- Batted: Right Threw: Right

Professional debut
- MLB: June 12, 2000, for the Cleveland Indians
- KBO: July 6, 2008, for the Kia Tigers

Last appearance
- MLB: September 23, 2007, for the Philadelphia Phillies
- KBO: September 16, 2008, for the Kia Tigers

MLB statistics
- Win–loss record: 4–10
- Earned run average: 5.53
- Strikeouts: 100

KBO statistics
- Win–loss record: 2–5
- Earned run average: 3.98
- Strikeouts: 42
- Stats at Baseball Reference

Teams
- Cleveland Indians (2000); Milwaukee Brewers (2000); Colorado Rockies (2001); New York Mets (2002); Milwaukee Brewers (2005); Philadelphia Phillies (2007); Kia Tigers (2008)

Kane Thomas Davis (born June 25, 1975) is an American former professional baseball pitcher. He pitched for the Cleveland Indians, Colorado Rockies, New York Mets, Milwaukee Brewers, and Philadelphia Phillies of Major League Baseball (MLB), as well as the Kia Tigers of the KBO League.

== Career ==
Davis grew up in Spencer, West Virginia and attended Spencer High School, where he was named to the West Virginia All-State Team as a senior and led Spencer to the state championship. After graduating from high school, he was drafted by the Pittsburgh Pirates in the 13th round of the 1993 Major League Baseball draft. He spent the next seven seasons in the Pirates' farm system. In 1999, he split the season between the AA Altoona Curve and AAA Nashville Sounds. He had a win–loss record of 7–8, an earned run average (ERA) of 4.79, and 84 strikeouts. He was released at the end of the season.

He was signed as a free agent by the Cleveland Indians and made his major league debut on June 12, 2000. He pitched in five games for the Indians, two of them starts, and had an 0–3 record and 14.73 ERA in those games. At the 2000 trade deadline, he was sent to the Milwaukee Brewers along with Paul Rigdon, Richie Sexson, and later Marco Scutaro for Jason Bere, Bob Wickman and Steve Woodard. He played in three games for the Brewers to end the season. Just before the 2001 season began, Davis was traded to the Colorado Rockies along with Juan Acevedo and Jose Flores for Mike DeJean, Mark Leiter, and Elvis Pena. He spent the entire season with the Rockies. Pitching in 57 games, he compiled a 2–4 record with a 4.35 ERA.

After the 2001 season, he was traded to the New York Mets for Corey Brittan. Davis pitched in 16 games and had a 7.07 ERA on the season. After spending the next two years in the minor leagues, he re-signed with the Brewers and split the 2005 season between the Brewers and Sounds. In 15 games, he had a 2.70 ERA and a 1–1 record. After spending 2006 in the independent Atlantic League of Professional Baseball with the Somerset Patriots, he appeared in 11 games with the Philadelphia Phillies in 2007. Davis followed that up with a stint in the Korea Baseball Organization with the Kia Tigers in 2008. He concluded his professional baseball career with two more years in the Atlantic League before retiring after the 2010 season.
