= Marco Scutaro =

Venezuelan baseball player (born 1975)

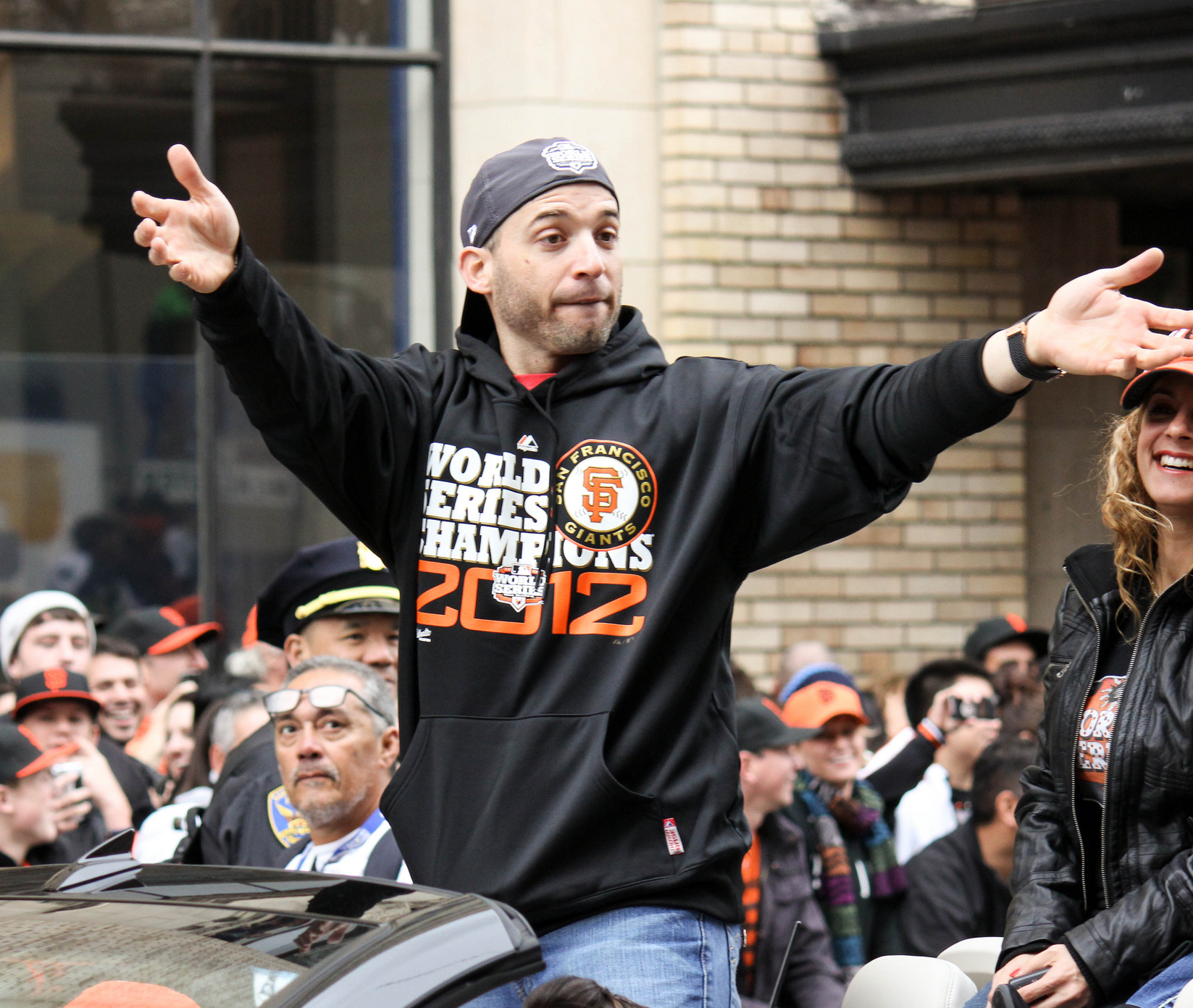
- Scutaro during the 2012 San Francisco Giants World Champions Homecoming Parade
- Shortstop / Second baseman
- Born: October 30, 1975 (age 50); San Felipe, Venezuela
- Batted: Right Threw: Right

MLB debut
- July 21, 2002, for the New York Mets

Last MLB appearance
- July 24, 2014, for the San Francisco Giants

MLB statistics
- Batting average: .277
- Home runs: 77
- Runs batted in: 509
- Stats at Baseball Reference

Teams
- New York Mets (2002–2003); Oakland Athletics (2004–2007); Toronto Blue Jays (2008–2009); Boston Red Sox (2010–2011); Colorado Rockies (2012); San Francisco Giants (2012–2014)

Career highlights and awards
- All-Star (2013); World Series champion (2012); NLCS MVP (2012)

Marcos Scutaro, better known as Marco Scutaro, (/ˈskutəroʊ/ SKOOT-ər-oh; born October 30, 1975) is a Venezuelan former professional baseball infielder. He bats and throws right-handed. Scutaro made his major league debut with the New York Mets in 2002, and subsequently played for the Oakland Athletics, Toronto Blue Jays, Boston Red Sox, Colorado Rockies and San Francisco Giants. Scutaro was named the most valuable player of the 2012 National League Championship Series while with the Giants; he and the team then won the 2012 World Series over the Detroit Tigers.

Scutaro was one of the primary subjects of the 2005 documentary A Player to be Named Later.

== Early life ==
Marcos Scutaro was born on October 30, 1975, in San Felipe, Venezuela. He is of Italian descent. He began playing baseball at age six.

== Professional career ==
=== Minor leagues ===
Scutaro originally signed with the Cleveland Indians as an amateur free agent on July 26, 1994. As a teenager, Scutaro considered Cleveland infielder and fellow Venezuelan Omar Vizquel his favorite player and would often watch Vizquel at spring training.

Scutaro was traded by the Indians to the Milwaukee Brewers on August 30, 2000, as the player to be named later in a trade that had sent Kane Davis, Paul Rigdon and Richie Sexson to the Brewers for Jason Bere, Bob Wickman and Steve Woodard on July 28. Scutaro was in the 2005 documentary film A Player To Be Named Later, which followed players from Indianapolis Indians, the Triple-A affiliate of the Milwaukee Brewers, for one season. He was waived at the start of the 2002 season by the Brewers, who needed to make room for Nelson Figueroa on its roster.

Scutaro was claimed off waivers by the New York Mets on April 5, 2002. He batted .319 with 22 doubles, seven home runs, 28 runs batted in and 48 runs scored in 97 games with the Triple-A Norfolk Tides in 2002. He was also selected to the International League squad for the Triple-A All-Star Game that summer.

=== New York Mets (2002–2003) ===
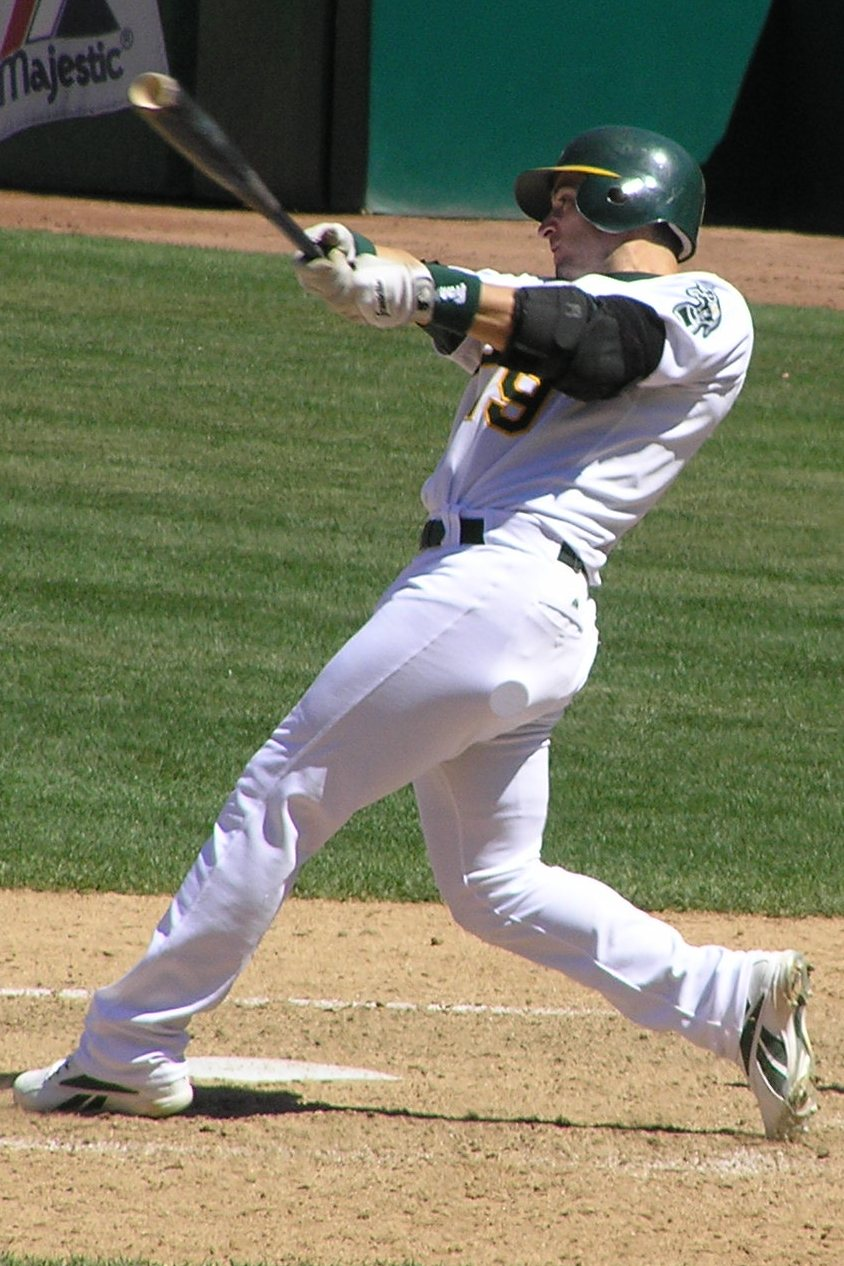
Scutaro batting for the Athletics in 2005

Scutaro's first promotion to the majors came on July 19 when the Mets recalled him from the Tides to replace the injured Joe McEwing. Scutaro introduced himself to Mets manager Bobby Valentine that afternoon while the latter was eating lunch at the hotel in Cincinnati where the team was staying. Valentine reciprocated the greeting without knowing who Scutaro was. After completing his meal, Valentine inquired about why Scutaro was lingering. "I just got called up", Scutaro responded.

=== Oakland Athletics (2004–2007) ===
Scutaro was again selected off waivers, this time by the Oakland Athletics, on October 9, 2003.

Scutaro landed a starting second baseman position after Mark Ellis had a season-ending shoulder injury during 2004 spring training.

In 2004, Scutaro reached career highs in batting average (.273), runs batted in (43), runs (50), hits (124), doubles (32), at bats (455) and games played (137). He played multiple positions during his four seasons in Oakland, including second base, shortstop, third base, left field and right field.

=== Toronto Blue Jays (2008–2009) ===
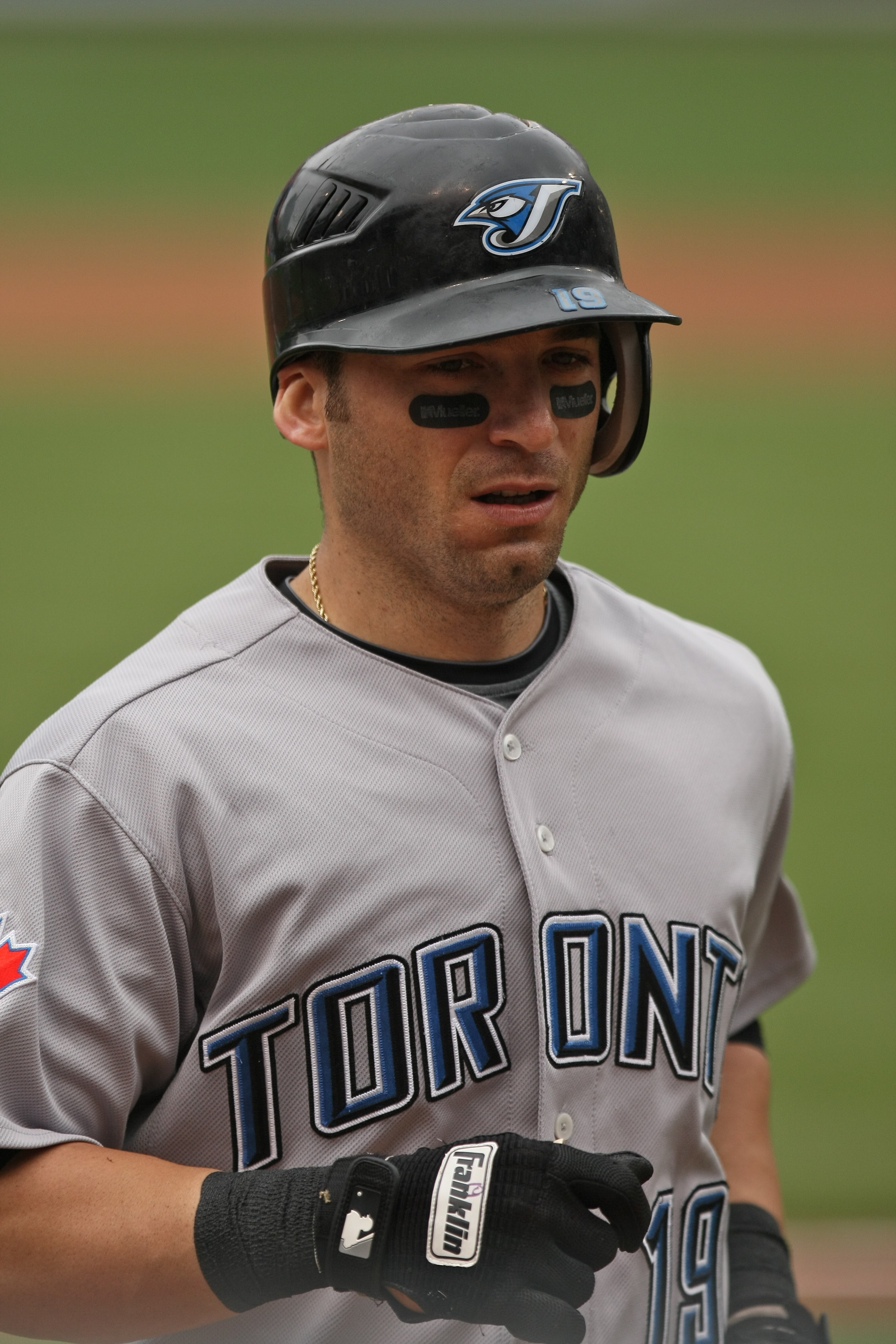
Scutaro with the Blue Jays in 2009

On November 18, 2007, Scutaro was traded to the Toronto Blue Jays for minor league pitchers Kristian Bell and Graham Godfrey.

Scutaro was the Jays' third baseman for at least a month, after teammate Scott Rolen injured a finger, and then Scutaro returned to a starter's role after teammate David Eckstein injured his right hip flexor on May 6. Shortly after Eckstein's return, Eckstein and Blue Jays teammate Aaron Hill collided trying to catch a fly ball. Hill suffered from concussion-like symptoms, and Scutaro filled in at second base.

Scutaro was the starting shortstop for the Blue Jays in 2009, and had his best season to date, achieving career highs in almost every offensive category: 12 home runs, 60 runs batted in, 35 doubles, 235 total bases, 162 hits, 100 runs, 14 stolen bases, and 90 walks in 574 at-bats, while playing excellent defense.

=== Boston Red Sox (2010–2011) ===
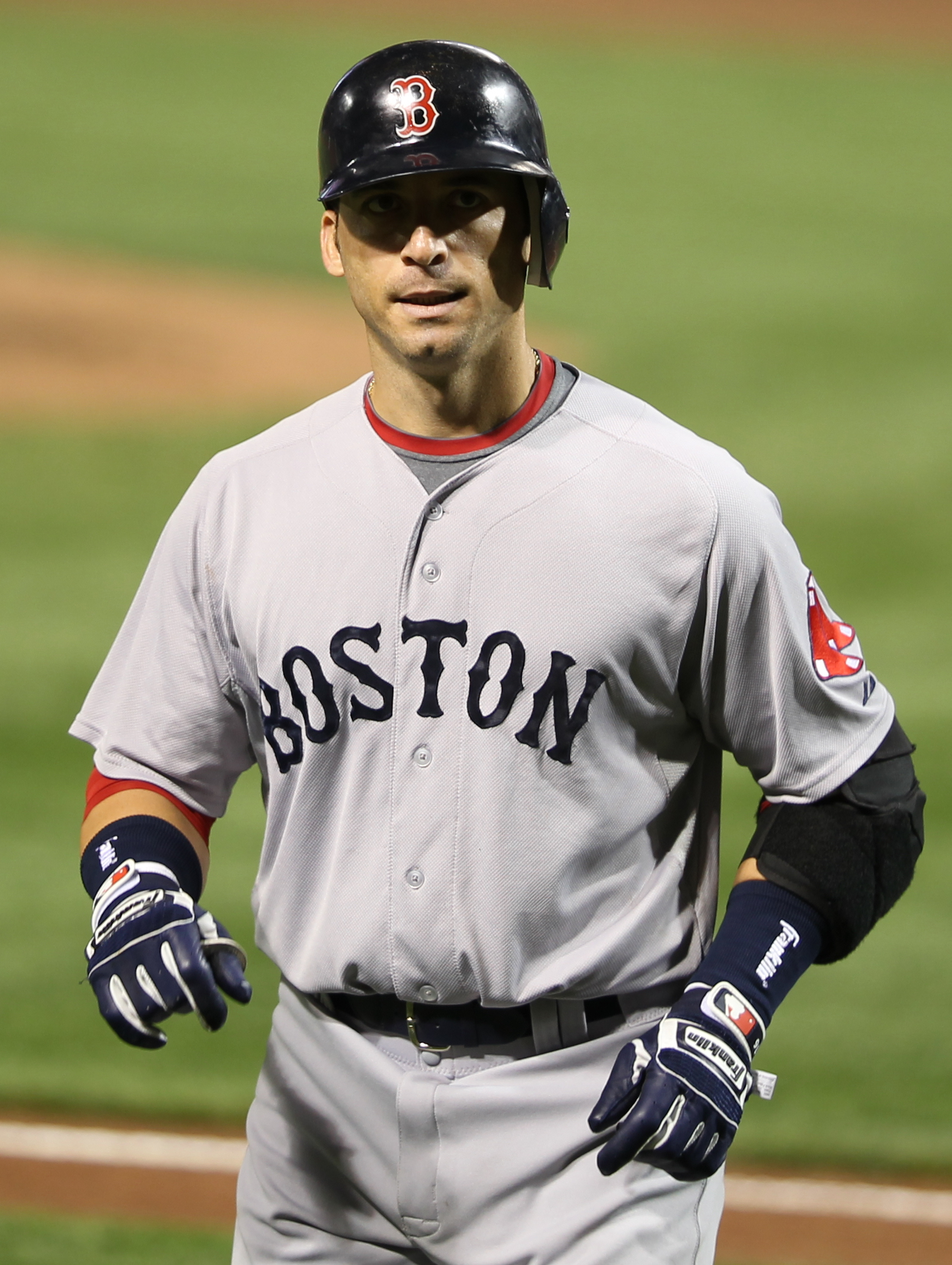
Scutaro with the Red Sox in 2011

On December 3, 2009, Scutaro agreed to a two-year, $11 million deal with the Boston Red Sox. The deal also included a third-year mutual option. On April 12, 2010, Scutaro recorded the first hit in Target Field history on a single up the middle in the first inning off Minnesota Twins starter Carl Pavano. Soon after, Scutaro was caught stealing second base, making him the first out recorded at the Twins' new ballpark.

In his first season with the team, Scutaro set a number of career highs, including games (150), at-bats (632), hits (174) and doubles (38) while suffering for much of the season with a right shoulder injury which forced him out of practice.

=== Colorado Rockies (2012) ===
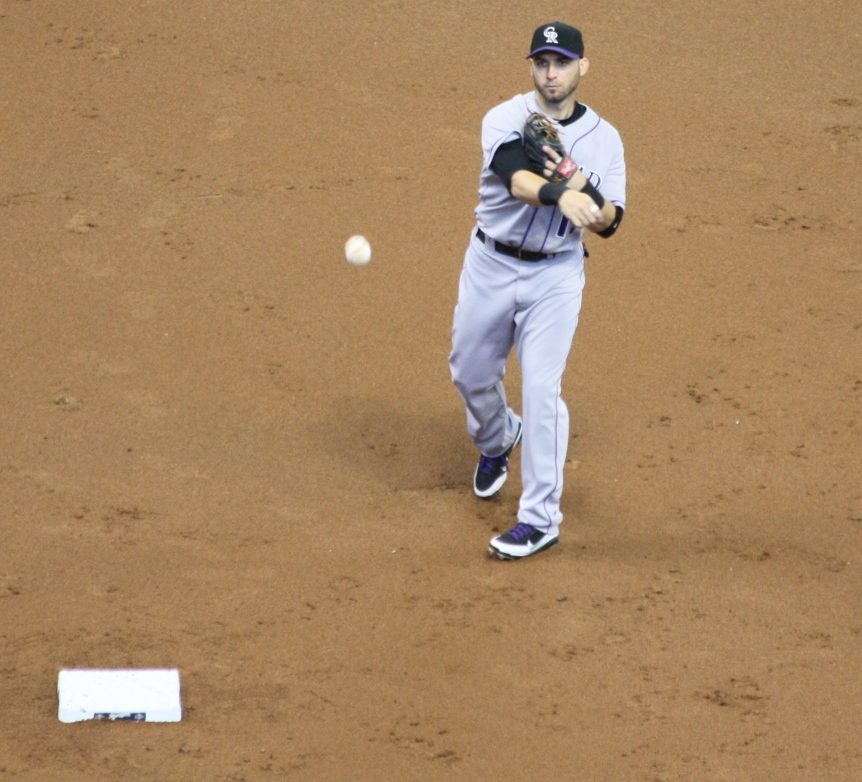
Scutaro fielding for the Rockies in 2012

On October 30, 2011, the Red Sox and Scutaro agreed to exercise their mutual contract option. Then, on January 21, 2012, Scutaro was traded to the Colorado Rockies for pitcher Clayton Mortensen.

=== San Francisco Giants (2012–2014) ===
On July 27, 2012, Scutaro was traded, along with cash considerations, to the San Francisco Giants for infielder Charlie Culberson. In a game against the St. Louis Cardinals at Busch Stadium on August 8, 2012, Scutaro drove in a career high seven runs, including a grand slam. He hit .306 for the regular season, including .362 as a Giant, helping the Giants win the National League West title. He was awarded the NLCS MVP after tying the NLCS record with 14 hits and also batting .500 (14-for-28) with six runs scored and four runs batted in during the seven-game series against the Cardinals. On October 28, in the tenth inning of Game 4 of the 2012 World Series, Scutaro drove in Ryan Theriot for the winning run, as the Giants swept the Detroit Tigers.

After the 2012 season, Scutaro and the Giants agreed to a three-year, $20 million contract, which became official on December 7, 2012. In 2013, Scutaro was the starting second baseman, with Tony Abreu and Nick Noonan as his main backups. In 81 games in the first half, Scutaro hit .316/.367/.400 with two home runs, 22 runs batted in and 37 runs, and he was named to the 2013 All-Star Game. Scutaro played his last game of 2013 on September 15, and was officially shut down on September 24. He underwent surgery on September 27 that inserted a pin in his left pinkie correcting his mallet finger, an injury he suffered on June 11 against the Pirates when he was hit by Tony Watson. In 127 games in 2013, he hit .297/.357/.369 with two home runs, 31 runs batted in and 57 runs.

Scutaro started the 2014 season on the disabled list with back problems. He played in five games in July before his back issues forced him to return to the disabled list for the remainder of the season. On December 19, 2014, Scutaro underwent back surgery that some reports indicated could end his career. The Giants designated him for assignment on January 21, 2015, and he was removed from the 40-man roster. On January 28, 2015, Scutaro was released by the Giants. The Giants re-signed Scutaro to a major league contract on June 17 and placed him on the 60-day disabled list. He continued to rehabilitate his injury with the Giants, not with the intention of playing, but "in hopes of maintaining a quality of life and be pain-free with his family," according to the Giants.

== World Baseball Classic ==
Because of his Italian heritage, Scutaro was given the option of playing for either Italy or Venezuela in the 2006 World Baseball Classic. He chose to play for Venezuela as a utility infielder. He again represented Venezuela in the 2009 World Baseball Classic and 2013 World Baseball Classic. Venezuela won the bronze medal in 2009, but in 2013 earned an early exit after a loss to Puerto Rico 6–3. However, Venezuela won against newcomers Spain to earn a direct qualification for the 2017 World Baseball Classic.

== See also ==
- List of Major League Baseball players from Venezuela
