= Manny Alexander =

Dominican baseball player (born 1971)

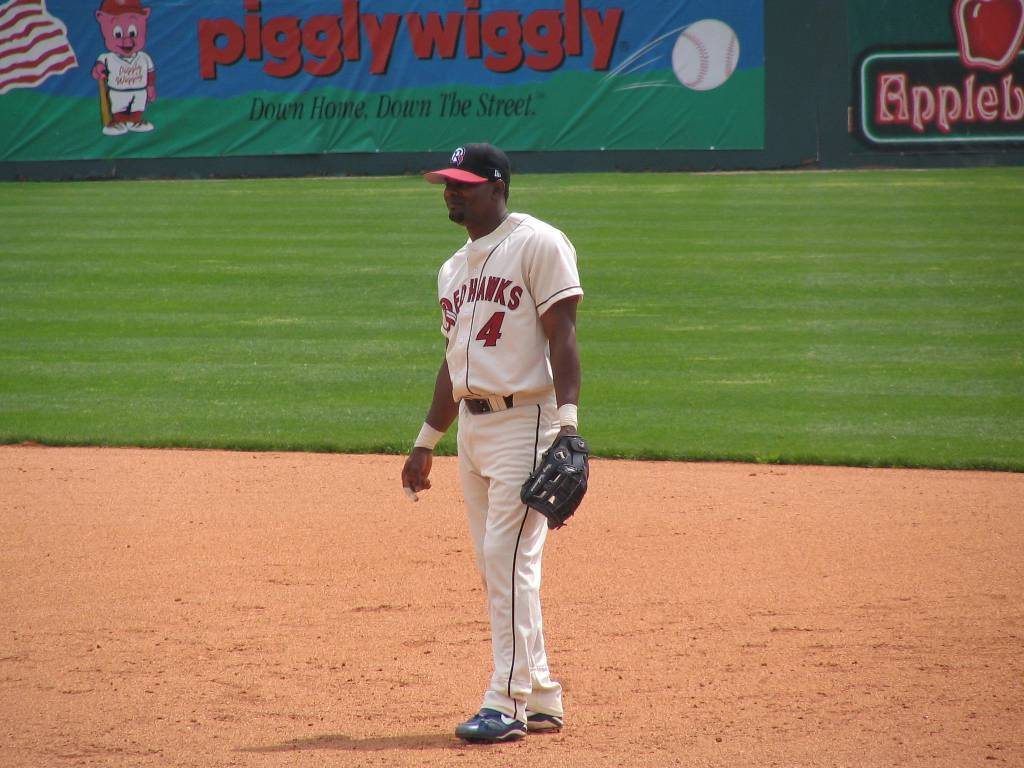
- Alexander with the Oklahoma RedHawks in 2005
- Infielder
- Born: March 20, 1971 (age 55); San Pedro de Macorís, Dominican Republic
- Batted: Right Threw: Right

MLB debut
- September 18, 1992, for the Baltimore Orioles

Last MLB appearance
- September 28, 2006, for the San Diego Padres

MLB statistics
- Batting average: .231
- Home runs: 15
- Runs batted in: 115
- Stats at Baseball Reference

Teams
- Baltimore Orioles (1992–1993, 1995–1996); New York Mets (1997); Chicago Cubs (1997–1999); Boston Red Sox (2000); Texas Rangers (2004); San Diego Padres (2005–2006)

Manuel De Jesús Alexander (born March 20, 1971) is a Dominican former professional baseball infielder. He has played for the Baltimore Orioles (1992–1993, 1995–1996), New York Mets (1997), Chicago Cubs (1997–1999), Boston Red Sox (2000), Texas Rangers (2004) and San Diego Padres (2005–2006). He bats and throws right-handed.

== Career ==
=== Baltimore Orioles ===
Alexander was signed as a 16-year-old amateur free agent by the Baltimore Orioles on February 4, 1988.

Alexander made his big league debut with the Orioles at the age of 21 on September 18, 1992, during a 12–4 loss to the Milwaukee Brewers. Alexander appeared as a defensive replacement for Cal Ripken Jr. in the bottom of the seventh inning and struck out in his only at-bat of the game.

Alexander made a brief pitching appearance in an April 19, 1996 game against the Texas Rangers. The Orioles entered the bottom of the 8th inning down 10–7. Armando Benítez surrendered a single and two walks before being replaced by Jesse Orosco. Orosco then gave up two walks, six hits, and a sacrifice fly, giving the Rangers a 17–7 lead. With the game now out of reach, manager Davey Johnson brought in Alexander to pitch. Alexander walked the first three batters he faced (all with the bases loaded), allowed a sacrifice fly, walked another hitter, and then surrendered a grand slam to Kevin Elster before finally getting a groundout to end the 16-run inning.

=== New York Mets ===
Alexander was traded by the Orioles along with Scott McClain to the New York Mets for Héctor Ramírez on March 22, 1997. He appeared in many games that spring, hitting .248 with two home runs and 14 RBI, stealing 11 bases in 11 attempts, in 54 games with the Mets before being named on August 14 as the player to be named later in an earlier trade. The Mets sent Alexander, Lance Johnson, and Mark Clark to the Chicago Cubs for Brian McRae, Mel Rojas, and Turk Wendell.

=== Chicago Cubs ===
Alexander hit .293 with a homer and seven RBI in 33 games with the Cubs in his six weeks with the team in 1997. In 1998, he hit .227 in 108 games with Chicago, belting a career-high five home runs. In 1999, Alexander appeared in 90 games with the Cubs and hit .271, the highest batting average of his career.

His relative success in the regular season did not translate to post-season glory as Alexander went 0-for-5 in two games during the 1998 National League Division Series against the Atlanta Braves.

The Cubs traded Alexander on December 12, 1999, to the Boston Red Sox for outfielder Damon Buford.

=== Boston Red Sox ===
Alexander hit .211 with four home runs and 19 RBI in 101 games with the Red Sox in 2000, his lone season in Boston.

On June 30, 2000, during a traffic stop, police discovered a bottle of anabolic steroids and two hypodermic needles in a Mercedes-Benz owned by Alexander that had been loaned to team bat boy Carlos Cowart, a high school student. Cowart was arrested for driving without a license and previous charges of driving without a license and failing to stop for police. Massachusetts State Police initially sought steroid possession charges against Alexander, but opted not to after the ballplayer's lawyers provided evidence that at least five people had access to the vehicle. Alexander's name appeared in the Mitchell Report, released on December 13, 2007, as a result of the incident.

=== Texas Rangers ===
After the 2000 season and steroids incident, Alexander bounced around with minor league affiliates of the Seattle Mariners, New York Yankees, and Milwaukee Brewers—as well as a brief stint playing in Mexico—before being purchased by the Texas Rangers on March 24, 2003. He spent the 2003 season in the Rangers' minor league system before returning to the big leagues after a three-season absence in 2004. His return was brief, however, as Alexander appeared in 21 games with Texas, hitting .238 (5-for-21) with three RBI and a pair of doubles.

=== San Diego Padres ===
Alexander played the 2005 season in the minor leagues, before being traded by the Rangers to the San Diego Padres, on August 31, in exchange for minor leaguer Juan Jimenez.

Alexander appeared in 11 games with San Diego in 2005, hitting just .111 (2-for-18) with a double, playing each infield position at least once. He was released at the end of the season, but re-signed less than a month later.

In 2006, Alexander reported late to spring training with the Padres due to visa problems in the Dominican Republic. Upon joining the team, he was optioned to San Diego's Triple-A affiliate, the Portland Beavers. He split the 2006 season between Portland and San Diego, but was released by the Padres on October 12, 2006.

In 2007, Alexander attended spring training with the Padres, but did not make the major league club. Assigned to Triple-A Portland for the third straight season, he played just 7 games before being released.

=== Washington Nationals ===
After being released by the Padres, Alexander signed a minor league deal with the Washington Nationals, playing for their Triple-A affiliate, the Columbus Clippers. He became a minor league free agent at the end of the season.

=== Totals ===
In an eleven-season career, Alexander posted a .231 batting average with 15 home runs and 115 RBI in 594 games played with six teams.

=== Philadelphia Phillies ===
On July 23, 2009 Alexander signed a minor league contract with the Philadelphia Phillies.

Alexander became a free agent after the 2009 season. He has not played professionally since.

=== Italy ===
In 2008, Alexander signed to play with Telemarket Rimini in Italy's Serie A1. In his first season in Italy, he hits .331 with 2 home runs and 20 RBI.

In 2009, he signed to play with Caffè Danesi Nettuno in the Italian Baseball League.

== See also ==
- List of Major League Baseball players named in the Mitchell Report
