= Paul Shuey =

American baseball player (born 1970)

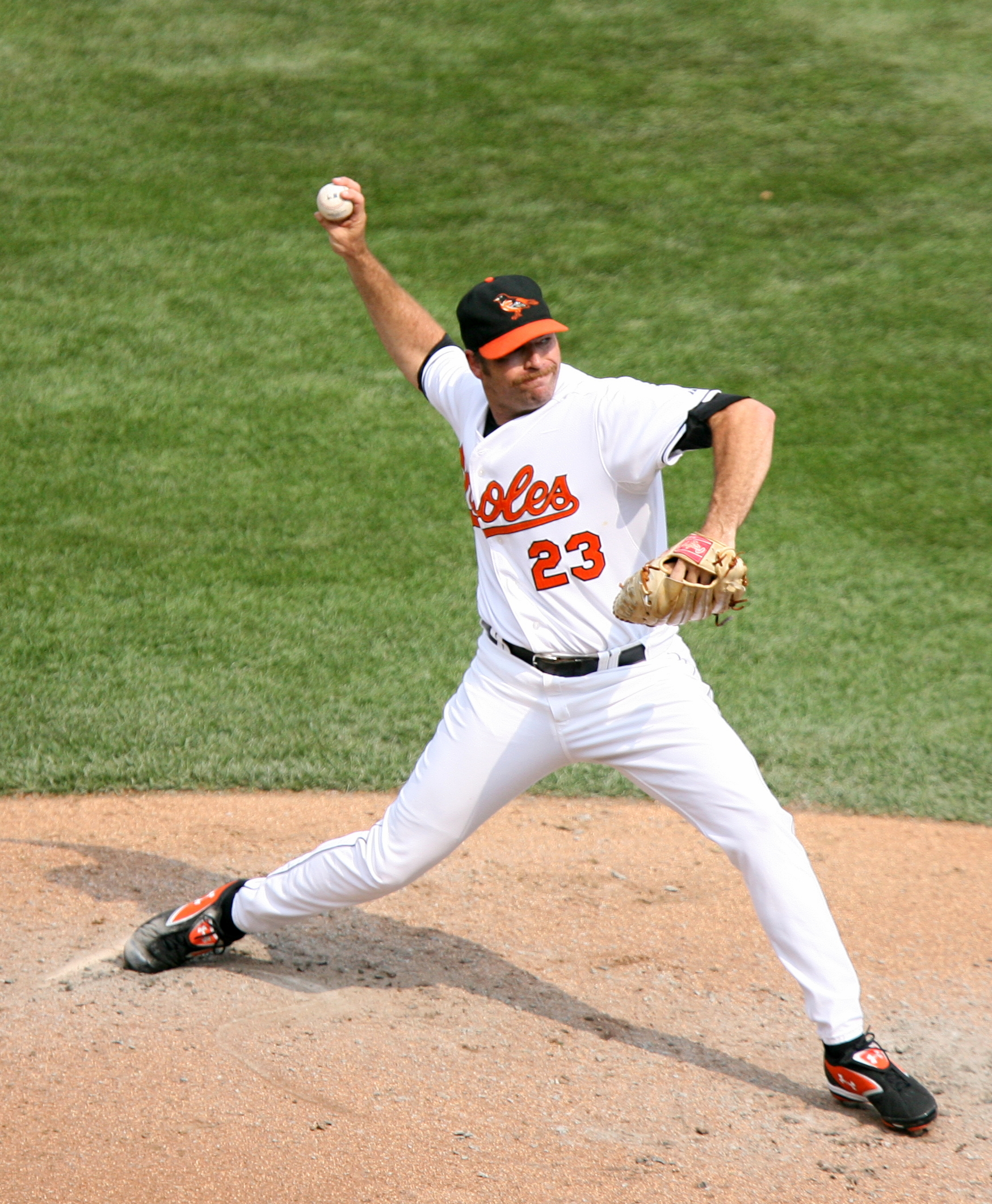
- Shuey pitching for the Orioles
- Pitcher
- Born: September 16, 1970 (age 55); Lima, Ohio, U.S.
- Batted: Right Threw: Right

MLB debut
- May 8, 1994, for the Cleveland Indians

Last MLB appearance
- August 26, 2007, for the Baltimore Orioles

MLB statistics
- Win–loss record: 45–28
- Earned run average: 3.87
- Strikeouts: 556
- Stats at Baseball Reference

Teams
- Cleveland Indians (1994–2002); Los Angeles Dodgers (2002–2003); Baltimore Orioles (2007)
Medals
Men's baseball
Representing United States
Pan American Games
Bronze medal – third place	1991 Havana	Team

Paul Kenneth Shuey (born September 16, 1970) is an American former professional baseball player. Primarily a relief pitcher, Shuey pitched in Major League Baseball (MLB) for the Cleveland Indians (1994–2002), Los Angeles Dodgers (2002–2003) and Baltimore Orioles (2007).

Shuey was honored as an All-American as a college baseball pitcher for the North Carolina Tar Heels baseball team. The Indians selected Shuey with the second overall selection of the 1992 MLB draft. Envisioned as a comparable pitcher to Cincinnati Reds closer Rob Dibble, Shuey had more success as a setup reliever than closer.

Injuries sidelined Shuey throughout his career, preventing him from becoming a closer. When healthy, he enjoyed success with the Indians as a setup pitcher. He was traded to the Dodgers in 2002 to be their set up man while contending for a playoff spot. He pitched well until a hip injury initially suffered in 1999 forced Shuey to retire in 2004. After an experimental medical procedure, Shuey returned to baseball briefly in 2007 with the Orioles. He retired after that season, and took up a professional career in bass fishing, competing in what he considers "Double-A"-level tournaments.

== Early life ==
A native of Lima, Ohio, Shuey's family moved to North Carolina when he was ten years old. Shuey's father taught him how to pitch. He played American Legion and Babe Ruth League baseball with Everett Lindsay.

Shuey attended Millbrook High School in Raleigh, North Carolina. With Millbrook, Shuey was a starting pitcher and right fielder. While pitching for the baseball team at Millbrook, Shuey threw a no-hitter against Garner High School. He was named to North Carolina's All-Triangle and All-State teams.

== College career ==
Shuey enrolled at the University of North Carolina at Chapel Hill (UNC), where he played college baseball for the North Carolina Tar Heels baseball team in the Atlantic Coast Conference (ACC) of NCAA Division I. He served as the team's closer. At UNC, Shuey was named a freshman All-American and All-ACC pitcher for the Tar Heels in 1990, as he had an 8-1 win–loss record and eight saves. He led the team with 31 appearances, and the Tar Heels were the ACC regular season and tournament championships.

Though he suffered a patellar tendon rupture in 1991, Shuey led the Tar Heels with a 1.70 earned run average (ERA) that season. That summer, Shuey pitched for the United States national baseball team in the Pan American Games. He led the team with a 3.13 ERA and 87 strikeouts in the 1992 season, in 69 innings pitched. Shuey and Chad Holbrook won the team's S.H. Basnight Award as the team's most valuable players. Through 2001, Shuey's career winning percentage (.818) ranked fourth all time in UNC history. He was a letterman in all three seasons at UNC.

== Professional career ==
=== Cleveland Indians ===
The Indians selected Shuey with their first round draft pick, the second overall selection, in the 1992 Major League Baseball draft. The Indians envisioned that Shuey could develop into a closer similar to Rob Dibble of the Cincinnati Reds. Shuey made his professional debut with the Columbus Red Stixx of the Class-A South Atlantic League in 1992.

Heading into the 1993 season, Baseball America ranked Shuey as the 81st best prospect in baseball. He pitched for the Kinston Indians of the Class-A Carolina League in 1993, going 1–0 with a 4.84 ERA in 15 appearances, and was promoted to the Canton–Akron Indians of the Class-AA Eastern League that season. He opened the 1994 season with Kinston, where he went 1–0 with a 3.75 ERA and eight saves in 13 appearances.

The deaths of Indians' relief pitchers Steve Olin and Tim Crews in a boating accident heightened the Indians' need to develop Shuey. Shuey was promoted from Kinston to the major leagues during the 1994 season, becoming the first player promoted from Class-A to the majors since Greg Swindell during the 1986 season. He made his MLB debut on May 8, 1994. On May 14, Shuey became the tenth American League pitcher to strike out four batters in an inning. He also pitched for the Charlotte Knights of the Class-AAA International League that season. Baseball America ranked Shuey as the 67th best prospect in baseball heading into the 1995 season.

Shuey struggled with the Indians, with an 0–3 win–loss record, five saves, and 7.00 ERA in 21 appearances in 1994 and 1995. He also pitched for the Buffalo Bisons of the International League in 1995, and spent time on the disabled list with an injured hamstring. He also pitched for the Senadores de San Juan of the Puerto Rico Baseball League that winter to gain more experience.

After starting the 1996 season with Buffalo, Shuey was promoted to the Indians, where he pitched to a 5–2 record with a 2.85 ERA. He pitched in the postseason for the Indians, appearing in three games in the 1996 American League Division Series, which the Indians lost to the Baltimore Orioles. Shuey received a three-year contract from the Indians at the start of the 1997 season, worth $3.203 million guaranteed. An option year and performance bonuses made the maximum value of the contract $11.603 million over four seasons.

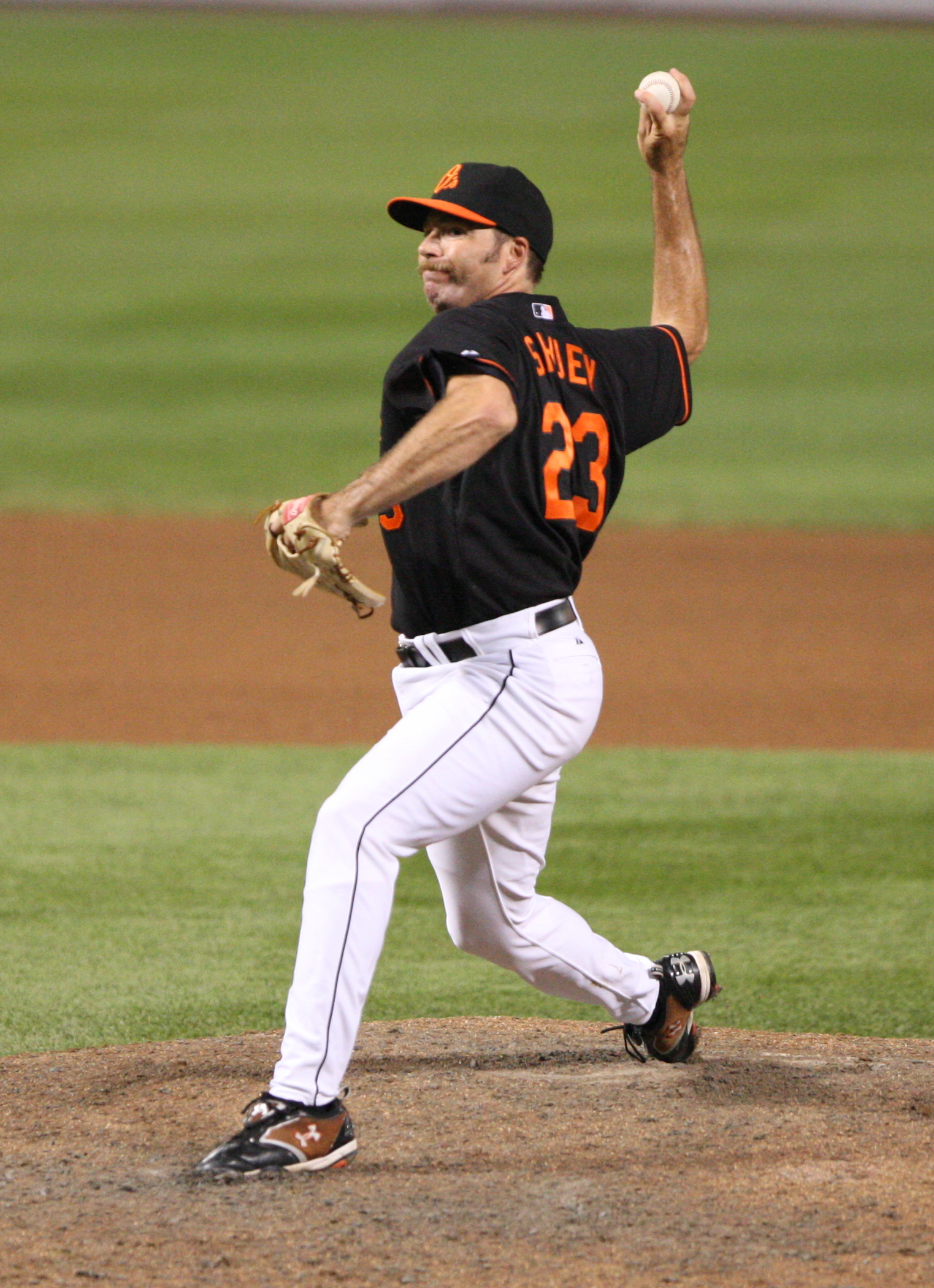
Shuey with the Orioles in July 2007

With José Mesa and Mike Jackson serving as closers for the Indians, Shuey pitched in middle relief. He spent time on the disabled list in the 1997 season on three separate occasions. In 1998, he led all American League relief pitchers with a .132 (7–for–53) batting average against when the opposition had baserunners in scoring position. His strong performances while healthy gave the Indians hope that Shuey could become their closer in due time. Shuey appeared in four postseasons for the Indians, including in 1998, when he pitched 6 1/3 scoreless innings for the Indians in the 1998 American League Championship Series.

In 1999, while pitching on a wet mound in Cleveland, Shuey injured his right hip. Over the next several seasons, he had multiple surgeries on his hip, including repairing a torn labrum and removing bone spurs. He finished the 1999 season with an 8–5 record, a 3.53 ERA, and six saves. His eight wins tied for the most among Cleveland's relief pitchers. In 2000, new Indians' manager Charlie Manuel indicated the Indians would attempt to shift Shuey into the closer role. When Shuey spent time on the disabled list, Steve Karsay served as the Indians' closer. He again spent time on the disabled list in 2001 with a strained elbow ligament.

=== Los Angeles Dodgers ===
As the 2002 trade deadline approached, teams interested in acquiring Shuey began to inquire on his availability. On July 28, 2002, before the trade deadline, Shuey was traded to the Los Angeles Dodgers for Terry Mulholland and minor leaguers Ricardo Rodríguez and Francisco Cruceta. With the Dodgers in the playoff chase that season, they hoped to pair him with closer Éric Gagné to form a strong bullpen for the later portions of games.

Though Shuey struggled upon joining the Dodgers, recording a 9.35 ERA in his first eleven appearances after the trade, he altered his approach and began to obtain better results, allowing no runs in his next five appearances. Shuey played for the Dodgers through the end of the 2003 season. During spring training prior to the 2004 season, he tore a ligament in his thumb and reinjured his hip while fielding a bunt during his rehabilitation. Shuey spent the entire season on the disabled list. The Dodgers sued the Hartford Life Insurance Company, who insured Shuey's contract, over Shuey's $3.25 million salary for the 2004 season, saying the insurance company did not honor their claim.

=== Later career ===
A free agent after the 2004 season, Shuey signed a minor league contract with the Indians to attempt a comeback in the 2005 season. After pitching two innings for the Class-AA Akron Aeros, he retired due to pain in his right hip.

Shuey sat out the whole 2006 season, as he received a hip replacement. The procedure, which involved installing a metal hip, was performed in Montreal, as it was not approved in the United States. On February 2, 2007, he signed a minor league contract with the Orioles that included an invitation to spring training. He suffered an injury and did not make the cut, and was sent to the minor leagues. He made one appearance for the Class-AA Bowie Baysox, and then joined the Norfolk Tides, the Orioles' Class-AAA affiliate. His contract was then purchased on June 19, 2007, and he appeared in that night's game against the San Diego Padres.

Though his fastball was able to reach 95 miles per hour (153 km/h) earlier in his career, Shuey's fastball had difficulty reaching 90 miles per hour (140 km/h) due to his metal hip. On July 1, 2007, he recorded his first save since 2002, in a game against the Los Angeles Angels of Anaheim. He finished the 2007 season with a 9.82 ERA in 22 games. In his penultimate appearance, in the first game of an August 22 doubleheader, he surrendered the last nine runs in a 30–3 defeat to the Texas Rangers, an American League record for most runs scored by a single team. As his fastball increased in velocity, Shuey injured his back. The Orioles gave Shuey his outright release on September 5.

== Personal ==
Shuey was inducted into the Kinston Professional Baseball Hall of Fame in 2011 and the Millbrook High School Hall of Fame in 2012.

Shuey lives with his family, including his wife Julie and three daughters; Morgan (born 1997), Casey (born 1998), and Kate (born 2006). in Wake Forest, North Carolina. He spends his time as a father, pitching coach, and bass fishing. He overcame posttraumatic stress disorder, which resulted from a car accident in 1996.

As of 2008, Shuey was competing in local bass fishing tournaments. He hoped to compete in the Bassmaster Elite Series of the Bass Anglers Sportsman Society.

In 2013, Shuey began serving as an assistant coach of the Barton Bulldogs women's soccer team.

== See also ==
- List of Major League Baseball single-inning strikeout leaders
