= Herbert Perry =

American baseball player (born 1969)

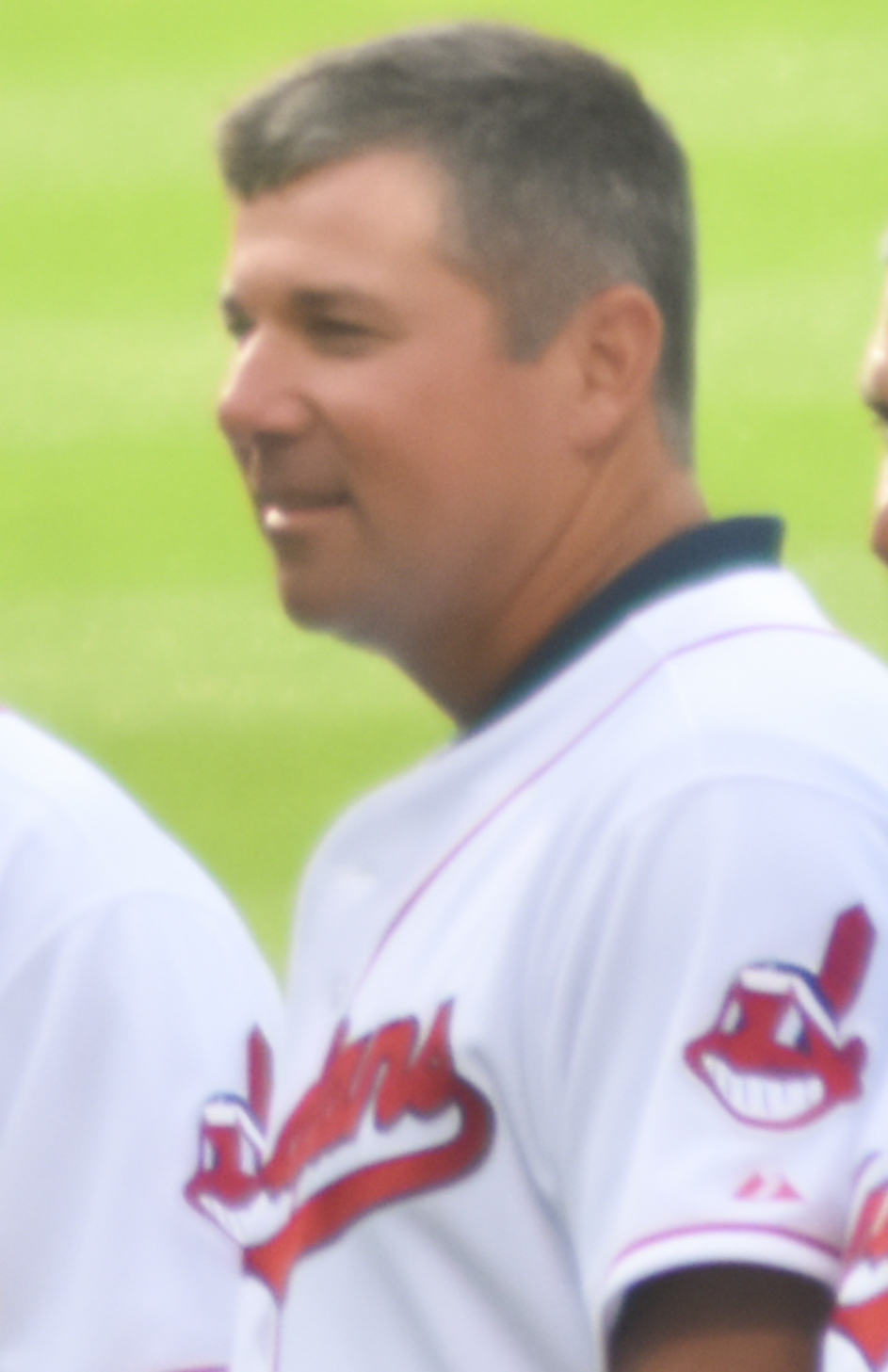
- Perry at Progressive Field in 2015
- Third baseman
- Born: September 15, 1969 (age 57); Live Oak, Florida, U.S.
- Batted: Right Threw: Right

MLB debut
- May 3, 1994, for the Cleveland Indians

Last MLB appearance
- September 10, 2004, for the Texas Rangers

MLB statistics
- Batting average: .272
- Home runs: 55
- Runs batted in: 246
- Stats at Baseball Reference

Teams
- Cleveland Indians (1994–1996); Tampa Bay Devil Rays (1999–2000); Chicago White Sox (2000–2001); Texas Rangers (2002–2004)

Herbert Edward Perry Jr. (born September 15, 1969) is an American former college and professional baseball player who was an infielder in Major League Baseball (MLB) for all or parts of nine seasons during the 1990s and 2000s. Perry played college baseball for the University of Florida, and he played professionally for the Cleveland Indians, Tampa Bay Devil Rays, Chicago White Sox, and Texas Rangers.

== Early years ==
Perry was born in Live Oak, Florida, in 1969. He attended Lafayette High School in Mayo, Florida, and played high school football and baseball for the Lafayette Hornets.

== College career ==
Perry accepted an athletic scholarship to attend the University of Florida in Gainesville, Florida, where he played for coach Joe Arnold's Florida Gators baseball team from 1988 to 1991, and he was also a quarterback for coach Galen Hall's Gators football team in 1987 and 1988. Perry was a key member of the Gators' College World Series teams in 1988 and 1991. He led the team with a .370 batting average in 1989. He graduated from the University of Florida in 1991 with a bachelor's degree in agricultural operations management.

== Professional career ==
Perry hit 22 home runs in 2002 for the Texas Rangers; he had hit only 28 home runs in his previous seven seasons total, though in limited playing time. Twelve of those 28 home runs came in 2000 with the Chicago White Sox. Perry was affectionately known as "The Milkman" by Chicago White Sox announcer Ken Harrelson. Injuries shortened his major league career to only nine seasons. He retired from baseball with a career batting average of .272.

== Life after the major leagues ==
Perry currently resides in the town of Mayo, Florida and manages a pre-cast septic tank business. He has two sons and two daughters,: Ethan, Drew, Gabrielle, and Olivia. Perry and his wife, Sheila, adopted Olivia from Ukraine in 2009.

He is the older brother of former MLB utility player Chan Perry.

== See also ==
- Florida Gators
- Florida Gators football, 1980–89
- List of Florida Gators baseball players
- List of University of Florida alumni
