= Jamie Brewington =

American baseball player (born 1971)

- Pitcher
- Born: September 28, 1971 (age 53); Greenville, North Carolina, U.S.
- Batted: Right Threw: Right

MLB debut
- July 24, 1995, for the San Francisco Giants

Last MLB appearance
- September 24, 2000, for the Cleveland Indians

MLB statistics
- Win–loss record: 9–4
- Earned run average: 4.85
- Strikeouts: 79
- Stats at Baseball Reference

Teams
- San Francisco Giants (1995); Cleveland Indians (2000)

Jamie Chancellor Brewington (born September 28, 1971) is an American former professional baseball player. The right-handed pitcher played for the San Francisco Giants in 1995 and the Cleveland Indians in 2000. He stood 6 feet 4 inches (1.93 m) tall and weighed 180 pounds (82 kg) during his active career.

== Career ==
Brewington attended Junius H. Rose High School in Greenville and Virginia Commonwealth University. Selected by the Giants in the tenth round of the 1992 Major League Baseball draft, Brewington was recalled from the Double-A Shreveport Captains in July 1995 and made 13 starts from July 24 through season's end. He won his first two Major League starts, on July 24 against the Florida Marlins and July 30 against the eventual 1995 world champion Atlanta Braves. Altogether, as a rookie he compiled a 6–4 win–loss record, allowing 68 hits (including eight home runs) in 75 1/3 innings pitched; he had the same number of walks and strikeouts (45).

However, Brewington failed to make the 1996 Giants and was ineffective in Triple-A, posting a 6–9 record and poor 7.02 ERA with the Phoenix Giants. He then was traded to the Kansas City Royals during the off-season. His struggles continued during the 1997 minor league campaign, with his earned run average ballooning to 7.84 in 23 games pitched. He was traded to the Milwaukee Brewers' organization on July 29 and then released on April 25, 1998. Brewington did not pitch professionally during the 1998 season.

He then signed with the Indians and struggled through another difficult season in the minors in 1999, going 1–10 with the Class A Kinston Indians. But Brewington lowered his ERA to a respectable 3.84 and earned a promotion in 2000 to the Indians' Triple-A affiliate, the Buffalo Bisons of the International League. Pitching exclusively in relief for the 2000 Bisons, he won his only decision, and further improved his earned run average to 3.02. Cleveland recalled him in June and used him in 26 games (all in relief). Brewington won his three decisions with Cleveland, with no losses, but allowed 56 hits and 19 walks in 45 1/3 innings pitched (he struck out 34). He had no saves and his ERA was a high 5.36.

Granted free agency at the end of the 2000 season, Brewington signed with the Minnesota Twins, but never returned to the Majors. He spent his last year in minor league baseball in 2002, then played one more professional season, in the independent leagues, in 2004.

He remains in baseball as a scout for the Pittsburgh Pirates.

As a Major Leaguer, Brewington won nine games, losing four (.692), with an ERA of 4.85 in 39 games and 120 2/3 innings pitched. He gave up 124 hits and 64 bases on balls, striking out 79.
