= Cam Cairncross =

Australian baseball player (born 1972)

- Relief pitcher
- Born: 11 May 1972 (age 54); Cairns, Queensland, Australia
- Batted: Left Threw: Left

MLB debut
- 20 July, 2000, for the Cleveland Indians

Last MLB appearance
- 1 October, 2000, for the Cleveland Indians

MLB statistics
- Win–loss record: 1–0
- Earned run average: 3.86
- Strikeouts: 9
- Stats at Baseball Reference

Teams
- Cleveland Indians (2000)

Cameron Cairncross (born 11 May 1972) is an Australian former baseball player. He was a left-handed pitcher in Major League Baseball who debuted for the Cleveland Indians on 20 July 2000, and pitched his final game on 1 October of that same season.

Cairncross was born in Cairns, Queensland, Australia and attended Cairns State High School. He signed with the San Diego Padres as an amateur free agent in 1990, and began his professional career a year later with the Charleston Rainbows. For the season, he had an 8–5 win–loss record and a 3.56 earned run average (ERA) in 24 games. The following season, Cairncross pitched for the Waterloo Diamonds and had an 8–8 record, a 3.61 ERA, and 138 strikeouts in 24 games. In 1993, he was promoted to the Rancho Cucamonga Quakes, and in 29 games for them, he had a 10–11 record and a 5.12 ERA.

Cairncross started the 1994 season with the Quakes, then was promoted to the Wichita Wranglers and the AAA Las Vegas Stars. After the season concluded, he had to have Tommy John surgery on his shoulder, and missed both the 1995 and 1996 seasons as a result. Cairncross then rejoined the Quakes in 1997 and pitched in 60 games, going 1–3 with a 5.62 ERA; the Padres released him after the season ended. After spending 1998 with the Brisbane Bandits of the Australian Baseball League, he was picked up by the Cleveland Indians and spent 1999 with the Kinston Indians and Buffalo Bisons. He then spent 2000 on the Akron Aeros and with Buffalo and was planned to be named to the Australian national baseball team for the 2000 Olympics, but was instead promoted to the major league roster.

He made his major league debut on 20 July, and his lone major league win came on 3 September 2000 against the Baltimore Orioles. Cairncross got the last two outs in the top of the 13th of an 11–11 game, then Kenny Lofton hit a walk off home run in the bottom of the 13th for a 12–11 victory. For the season, he appeared in 15 games, all in relief, and had a record of 1–0 with 2 games finished, 8 strikeouts, and an earned run average (ERA) of 3.86 in 9.1 innings pitched. In 2001, Cairncross had shoulder surgery, and ended up missing the entire season. He was released after the 2001 season, ending his professional baseball career.
