= Chan Perry =

American baseball player (born 1972)

- First baseman
- Born: September 13, 1972 (age 52); Live Oak, Florida, U.S.
- Batted: Right Threw: Right

MLB debut
- August 5, 2000, for the Cleveland Indians

Last MLB appearance
- August 11, 2002, for the Kansas City Royals

MLB statistics
- Batting average: .080
- Home runs: 0
- Runs batted in: 3
- Stats at Baseball Reference

Teams
- Cleveland Indians (2000); Kansas City Royals (2002)

Chan Everett Perry (born September 13, 1972) is a former American college and professional baseball player who was a utility infielder and outfielder in Major League Baseball (MLB) for parts of two seasons during the early 2000s. He played college baseball at Santa Fe Junior College (1991, 1992) and then the University of Florida (1993, 1994), and played professionally for the Cleveland Indians in 2000 and Kansas City Royals in 2002.

Perry was born in Live Oak, Florida. He attended Lafayette High School in Mayo, Florida, and played for the Lafayette Hornets high school baseball team.

Perry accepted and athletic scholarship to attend the University of Florida, where he played for coach Joe Arnold's Florida Gators baseball team in 1993 and 1994. During the 1994 season, he had a batting average of .311, and led the team with seventeen doubles, fifteen home runs, sixty-five run batted in, and a .984 fielding percentage. The Gators posted a 3–2 record in the 1994 NCAA Division I baseball tournament, ultimately losing to the top-seeded Miami Hurricanes 10–6 in the final of the Atlantic I Regional.

The Cleveland Indians selected Perry in the forty-fourth round of the 1994 Amateur Draft. He had two brief stints as an MLB player. He played in thirteen games in a variety of infielder and outfielder roles for the Indians in 2000, with fourteen at-bats and one hit, one run, and a batting average of .071. During the 2002 season, he appeared in five games as the first baseman for the Kansas City Royals with eleven at-bats, one hit, three runs batted in, and a batting average of .091. Perry finished his professional career with two minor league teams in the Pittsburgh Pirates organization in 2003.

Perry is the younger brother of former MLB third baseman Herbert Perry.

== See also ==
- Florida Gators
- List of Florida Gators baseball players
