= Willie Martínez (baseball) =

Venezuelan baseball player (born 1978)

Willie Martinez
- Pitcher
- Born: January 4, 1978 (age 48); Barquisimeto, Lara, Venezuela
- Batted: Right Threw: Right

MLB debut
- June 14, 2000, for the Cleveland Indians

Last MLB appearance
- June 14, 2000, for the Cleveland Indians

MLB statistics
- Win–loss record: 0-0
- Earned run average: 3.00
- Strikeouts: 1
- Stats at Baseball Reference

Teams
- Cleveland Indians (2000)

William José Martínez (born January 4, 1978) is a Venezuelan former relief pitcher in Major League Baseball who played for the Cleveland Indians in the 2000 season. Listed at 6' 2", 180 lb., Martínez batted and threw right-handed. He was born in Barquisimeto, Lara.

== Career ==
Martinez belongs to a group of ballplayers who at least secured a cup of coffee in the majors. He appeared in just one game with the Indians, allowing one earned run on one hit and one walk, striking out one hitter in three innings of work and did not have a decision.

== See also ==
- List of Major League Baseball players from Venezuela
