= Héctor Ramírez (baseball) =

Dominican baseball player (born 1971)

- Pitcher
- Born: December 15, 1971 (age 54); El Seibo, El Seibo, Dominican Republic
- Batted: Right Threw: Right

MLB debut
- August 28, 1999, for the Milwaukee Brewers

Last MLB appearance
- May 26, 2000, for the Milwaukee Brewers

MLB statistics
- Win–loss record: 1–3
- Earned run average: 5.40
- Strikeouts: 13

CPBL statistics
- Win–loss record: 0–1
- Earned run average: 2.76
- Strikeouts: 7
- Stats at Baseball Reference

Teams
- Milwaukee Brewers (1999–2000); Sinon Bulls (2005)

Career highlights and awards
- Taiwan Series champion (2005)

Héctor Bienvenido Ramírez (born December 15, 1971) is a Dominican former Major League Baseball (MLB) pitcher. He pitched parts of two seasons, 1999 and 2000, for the Milwaukee Brewers and also played in the CPBL for the Sinon Bulls.

== Career ==
On August 22, 1988, Ramírez was signed by the New York Mets as an undrafted free agent. After playing in the minors from 1989 to 1997, Ramírez was traded to the Baltimore Orioles in exchange for Manny Alexander and Scott McClain on March 22, 1997. On January 20, 1998, the New York Yankees claimed Ramírez off waivers from the Orioles, but quickly lost him back on waivers to the Orioles on January 30. On February 4, 1998, Ramírez was traded to the Florida Marlins in exchange for future considerations. On October 15, 1988, he elected free agency and signed with the Milwaukee Brewers on November 20, 1988. He made his major league debut on August 28, 1999. Ramírez was granted free agency on December 21, 1999, and re-signed with the Brewers on January 26, 2000. After a few appearances on the year, Ramírez was released on June 2, 2000. On June 8, 2000, Ramírez signed a minor league contract with the Baltimore Orioles organization. On August 24, 2000, the Orioles released Ramírez and he signed a minor league contract with the Houston Astros the next day. On October 18, 2000, Ramírez elected free agency. In 2002, Ramírez played for the San Angelo Colts of the Central Baseball League. In 2005, Ramírez played for the Sinon Bulls of the Chinese Professional Baseball League and won the Taiwan Series.
