= Steve Karsay =

American baseball player & coach (born 1972)

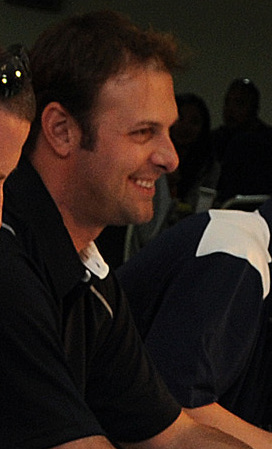
- Karsay at As Sayliyah Army Base in 2009
- Pitcher / Coach
- Born: March 24, 1972 (age 54); Flushing, New York, U.S.
- Batted: Right Threw: Right

MLB debut
- August 17, 1993, for the Oakland Athletics

Last MLB appearance
- June 17, 2006, for the Oakland Athletics

MLB statistics
- Win–loss record: 32–39
- Earned run average: 4.01
- Strikeouts: 458
- Stats at Baseball Reference

Teams
- Oakland Athletics (1993–1994, 1997); Cleveland Indians (1998–2001); Atlanta Braves (2001); New York Yankees (2002, 2004–2005); Texas Rangers (2005); Oakland Athletics (2006); As coach: Milwaukee Brewers (2019–2021); Los Angeles Angels (2024–2025)

Stefan Andrew Karsay (born March 24, 1972) is an American former professional baseball pitcher. He played in Major League Baseball (MLB) for the Oakland Athletics (1993–94, 1997, 2006), Cleveland Indians (1998–2001), Atlanta Braves (2001), New York Yankees (2002, 2004–05), and Texas Rangers (2005). He later served as the bullpen coach for the Milwaukee Brewers (2019–2021). Most recently, he was the bullpen coach for the Los Angeles Angels.

== Early life and amateur career ==
Karsay grew up in the College Point neighborhood in Queens, New York City, just a few miles from Shea Stadium. Karsay was a "star pitcher" at Christ the King Regional High School in Middle Village, Queens. He initially committed to play college baseball at Louisiana State. He was named the Gatorade High School Baseball Player of the Year for New York in 1990.

== Professional career ==
A 1st round draft pick of the Toronto Blue Jays in 1990, Karsay was traded to the Athletics along with outfielder José Herrera for Rickey Henderson on July 31, 1993. A starter in his early days with the Athletics, Karsay worked mostly in middle relief and as a set-up man from 1998 on, although he also had some notable success as a closer in 2000 with the Indians and 2002 with the Yankees.

His career was marred by injuries, causing him to miss the 1995 (elbow surgery), 1996 (Tommy John surgery) and 2003 (shoulder surgery) seasons; in all, he was on the disabled list seven times.

On July 28, 2005, together with Scott Feldman and A. J. Murray, he threw a perfect game against the Corpus Christi Hooks. It was the first combined nine-inning perfect game in Texas League history, and the third overall.

Finally, at age 34, Karsay announced his retirement on June 18, 2006, the day after pitching two scoreless innings against the Los Angeles Dodgers and getting the win in a 17-inning marathon for the Athletics. He finished his 11-year Major League career with a 32–39 record, 41 saves, and a 4.01 ERA in 357 career appearances, including 40 starts.

== Coaching ==
In 2012 the Cleveland Indians hired Karsay as pitching coach for the rookie-level AZL Indians. In 2016, Karsay was promoted to be the pitching coach for the Cleveland Indians Class-AAA affiliate, the Columbus Clippers.

Karsay was hired by the Milwaukee Brewers as their bullpen coach on November 19, 2018. He stepped down following the 2021 season to spend more time with his family.

On November 30, 2023, Karsay was hired as the new Los Angeles Angels bullpen coach and served in that position until 2025.
