= Bob Wickman =

American baseball player (born 1969)

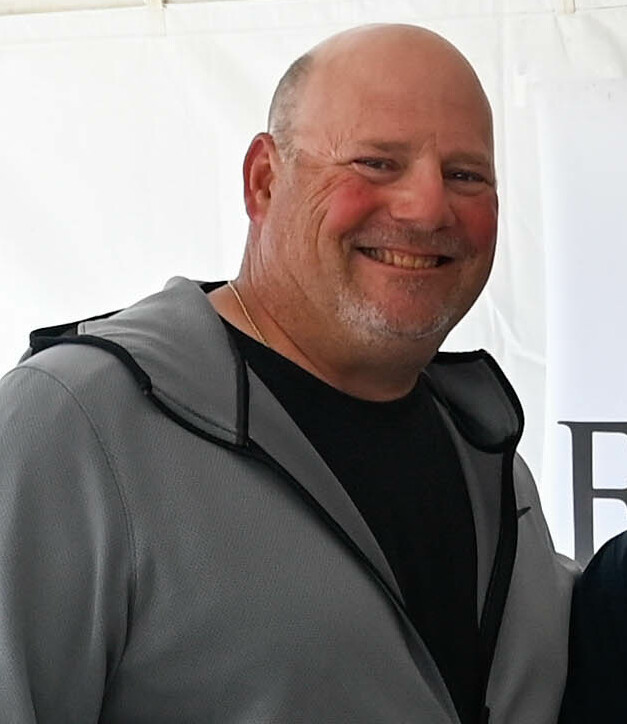
- Wickman in 2023
- Pitcher
- Born: February 6, 1969 (age 57); Green Bay, Wisconsin, U.S.
- Batted: Right Threw: Right

MLB debut
- August 24, 1992, for the New York Yankees

Last MLB appearance
- September 30, 2007, for the Arizona Diamondbacks

MLB statistics
- Win–loss record: 63–61
- Earned run average: 3.57
- Strikeouts: 785
- Saves: 267
- Stats at Baseball Reference

Teams
- New York Yankees (1992–1996); Milwaukee Brewers (1996–2000); Cleveland Indians (2000–2002, 2004–2006); Atlanta Braves (2006–2007); Arizona Diamondbacks (2007)

Career highlights and awards
- 2× All-Star (2000, 2005); AL saves leader (2005); Milwaukee Brewers Wall of Honor

Robert Joe Wickman (born February 6, 1969) is an American former professional baseball pitcher. He played 15 seasons in Major League Baseball (MLB) for five teams: the New York Yankees, Milwaukee Brewers, Cleveland Indians, Atlanta Braves, and Arizona Diamondbacks. He batted and threw right-handed.

== Amateur career ==
Wickman is from Abrams, Wisconsin. During a childhood farming accident, he lost part of his index finger on his right hand. At Oconto Falls High School, he played football, baseball, horseback riding, table tennis and basketball, being named an All-State pick in basketball. After high school, he attended University of Wisconsin–Whitewater, and was selected by the Chicago White Sox in the 1990 Major League Baseball draft (2nd round) and signed by area scout Mike Rizzo. In 1992, he was sent by Chicago to the New York Yankees in the same trade that brought Steve Sax to the White Sox.

== Major league career ==
=== New York Yankees ===
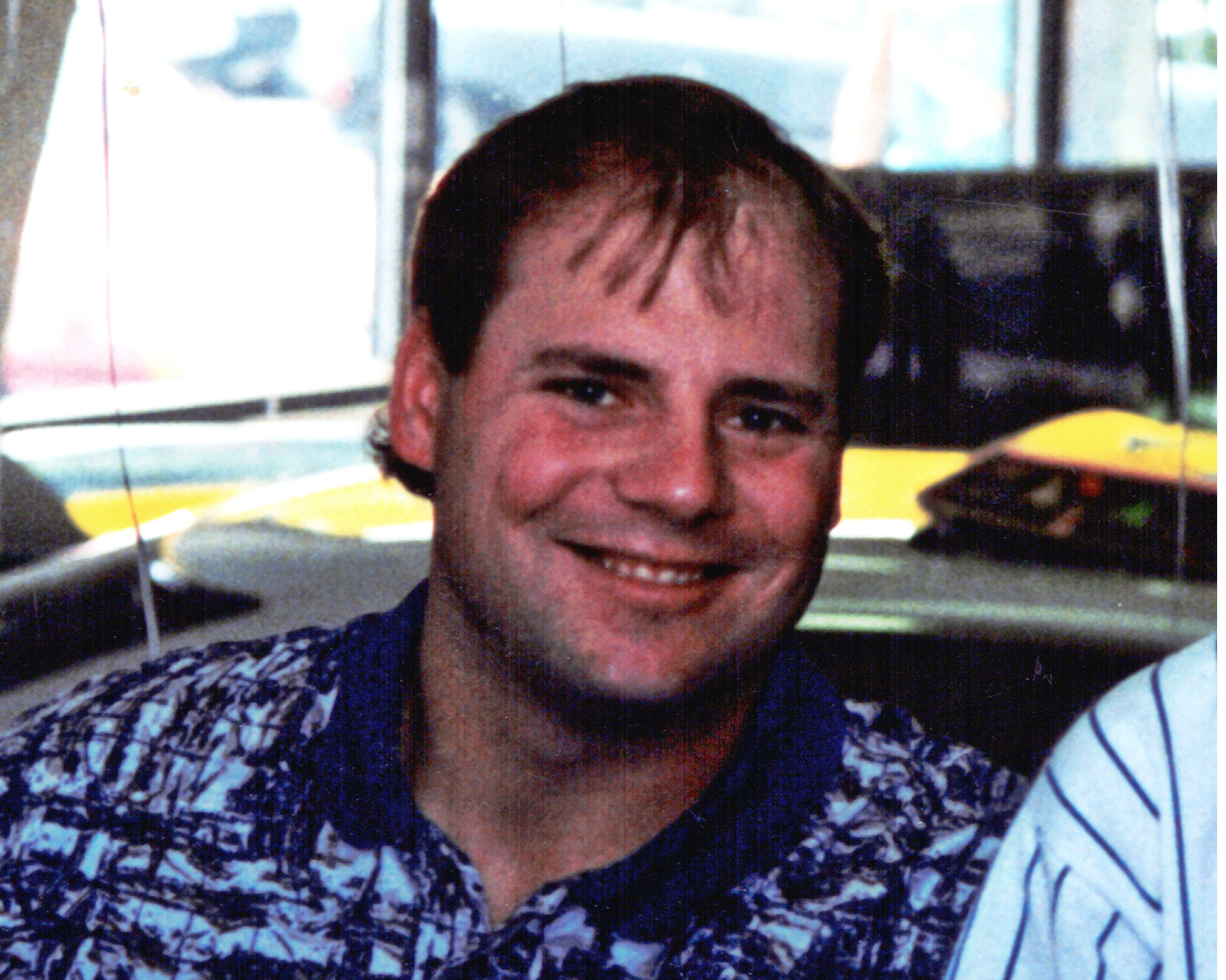
Wickman as a Yankee in 1996

Wickman's career with the Yankees began with a superb record of 20–5 in his first two seasons (1992–1993), including a 14–4 mark in 1993. In the strike-shortened 1994 season, Wickman appeared in an American League-high 53 games, all in relief, and posted a 3.09 earned run average (ERA) for the league-leading Yankees. Though he slumped to a 4.05 ERA in 1995, he rebounded to pitch three shutout innings in the Division Series against the Seattle Mariners. The Yankees lost that series in five games to Seattle.

=== Milwaukee Brewers ===
In August 1996, the Yankees traded Wickman and Gerald Williams to the Brewers for Graeme Lloyd and Pat Listach. The Brewers later sent Ricky Bones to the Yankees and reacquired Listach as Listach was injured at the time of the trade. After the Yankees won the World Series, they gave Wickman a World Series ring for being part of the active roster during the 1996 season.

Wickman made his first All-Star Game appearance in 2000 as a member of the Milwaukee Brewers. The day after Wickman was traded to the Cleveland Indians, the Brewers chose to hold a Bob Wickman Poster Night.

=== Cleveland Indians ===
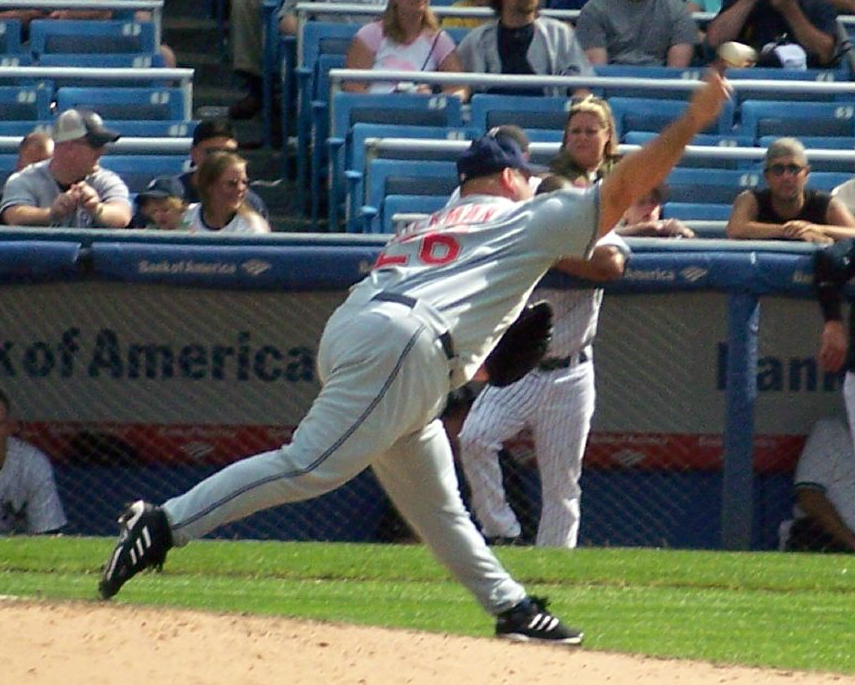
Wickman as a closer of the Cleveland Indians in 2006.

Occurring on July 28, 2000, the trade to Cleveland was a seven-player deal which brought Richie Sexson to Milwaukee.

On May 7, 2006, Wickman became the Indians' all-time franchise leader in saved games with 130, surpassing the record previously held by Doug Jones. His 139 saves with the Indians was a club record until Cody Allen passed it July 3, 2018, and his 45 saves on the season in 2005 is tied for second-best in team history.

=== Atlanta Braves ===
On July 20, 2006, Wickman was traded to the Atlanta Braves for Max Ramírez. Wickman then served as Atlanta's closer, recording his first save on July 24.

On September 20, 2006, Wickman signed a one-year $6.5 million contract extension to stay with the Atlanta Braves for the 2007 season.

On August 24, 2007, after giving up a walk-off two-run home run to Adam Dunn of the Cincinnati Reds in extra innings, Wickman complained to manager Bobby Cox about pitching in non-save situations. Consequently, he was released.

=== Arizona Diamondbacks ===
On September 7, 2007, Wickman signed a contract with the Arizona Diamondbacks, joining a bullpen that featured relievers Brandon Lyon and Tony Peña, alongside established closer José Valverde. Wickman pitched in 8 games for the Diamondbacks, going 0–1 with a 1.35 ERA. He became a free agent after the season, subsequently retiring.

Wickman ended his career with 511 games finished, ranking 34th all time among major league pitchers.

== Pitching style ==
Wickman was known to rely on his sinker to save games. He credited much of the motion on his sinker to missing part of his index finger.

== See also ==
- List of Major League Baseball annual saves leaders
