= Steve Woodard =

American baseball player (born 1975)

- Pitcher
- Born: May 15, 1975 (age 50); Hartselle, Alabama, U.S.
- Batted: Left Threw: Right

MLB debut
- July 28, 1997, for the Milwaukee Brewers

Last MLB appearance
- May 7, 2003, for the Boston Red Sox

MLB statistics
- Win–loss record: 32–36
- Earned run average: 4.94
- Strikeouts: 464
- Stats at Baseball Reference

Teams
- Milwaukee Brewers (1997–2000); Cleveland Indians (2000–2001); Texas Rangers (2002); Boston Red Sox (2003)

Steven Larry Woodard (born May 15, 1975) is an American former professional baseball pitcher. He played all or parts of seven seasons in Major League Baseball, from 1997 until 2003, for the Milwaukee Brewers, Cleveland Indians, Texas Rangers and Boston Red Sox. He batted left-handed and threw right-handed.

He broke into the majors by throwing eight shutout innings, striking out 12 and allowing only one walk and one hit against the Toronto Blue Jays. As of 2020, his game score of 91 is the highest by any debutant pitcher in American League history. He ended up with a 3-3 record and an ERA of 5.15 in his rookie year.

In 2008, his last professional season, Woodard pitched in the Florida Marlins organization, for their Triple-A affiliate, the Albuquerque Isotopes.

== See also ==
- List of Major League Baseball players named in the Mitchell Report
