= Paul Rigdon =

American baseball player (born 1975)

- Pitcher
- Born: November 2, 1975 (age 50); Jacksonville, Florida, U.S.
- Batted: Right Threw: Right

MLB debut
- May 21, 2000, for the Cleveland Indians

Last MLB appearance
- July 1, 2001, for the Milwaukee Brewers

MLB statistics
- Win–loss record: 8–10
- Earned run average: 5.45
- Strikeouts: 112
- Stats at Baseball Reference

Teams
- Cleveland Indians (2000); Milwaukee Brewers (2000–2001)

Paul David Rigdon (born November 2, 1975) is an American former professional baseball player who was a pitcher for two Major League Baseball seasons. Rigdon played for the Cleveland Indians and Milwaukee Brewers from 2000 to 2001.

Rigdon was born in Jacksonville, Florida. He attended Trinity Christian Academy in Jacksonville, and the University of Florida in Gainesville, where he played for the Florida Gators baseball team in 1996.

== See also ==
- Florida Gators baseball
- List of Florida Gators baseball players
