= Richie Sexson =

American baseball player (born 1974)

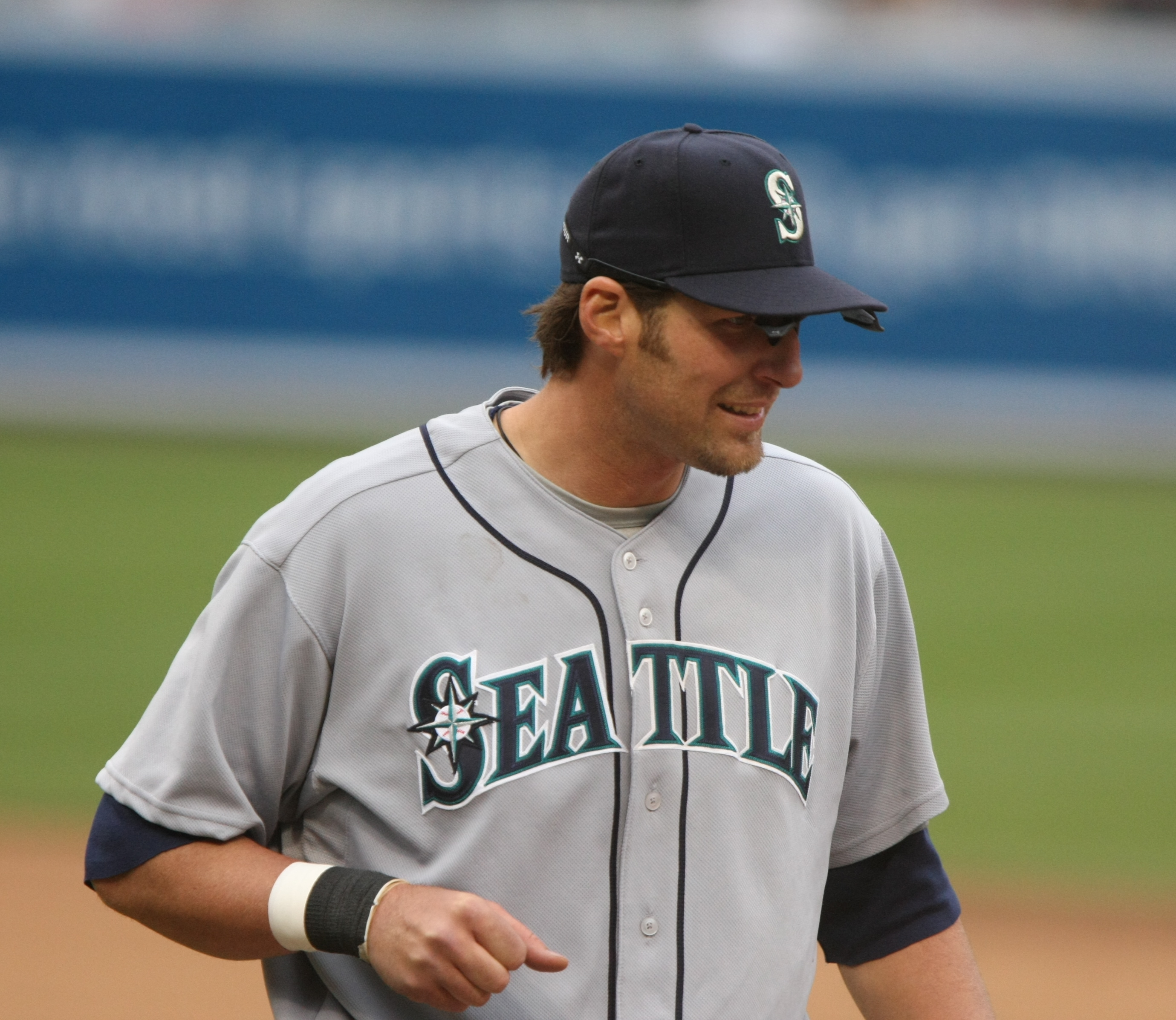
- Sexson with the Mariners in 2008
- First baseman
- Born: December 29, 1974 (age 51); Portland, Oregon, U.S.
- Batted: Right Threw: Right

MLB debut
- September 14, 1997, for the Cleveland Indians

Last MLB appearance
- August 13, 2008, for the New York Yankees

MLB statistics
- Batting average: .261
- Home runs: 306
- Runs batted in: 943
- Stats at Baseball Reference

Teams
- Cleveland Indians (1997–2000); Milwaukee Brewers (2000–2003); Arizona Diamondbacks (2004); Seattle Mariners (2005–2008); New York Yankees (2008)

Career highlights and awards
- 2× All-Star (2002, 2003); Milwaukee Brewers Wall of Honor

Richmond Lockwood Sexson (born December 29, 1974) is an American former professional baseball first baseman who played in Major League Baseball for the Cleveland Indians, Milwaukee Brewers, Arizona Diamondbacks, Seattle Mariners, and New York Yankees from 1997 to 2008. Sexson was a two-time MLB All-Star and was inducted onto the Milwaukee Brewers Wall of Honor. Sexson was also the field manager for the Windy City ThunderBolts in the West division of the Frontier League for the 2023 season.

== Amateur career ==
Sexson was born in Portland, Oregon. He attended Prairie High School in Brush Prairie, Washington, and was an All-State performer in baseball, basketball, and football. He also set the school record for the most runs batted in (RBIs) and home runs in a career.

Sexson was offered a scholarship to play both college baseball and college basketball for the Portland Pilots.

== Professional career ==
=== Cleveland Indians ===
The Cleveland Indians selected Sexson in the 24th round (671st overall) of the 1993 Major League Baseball draft. He reached the major leagues in late 1997, playing in five games for Cleveland. Sexson had a breakout year in 1999 with 31 home runs, and 116 RBIs in 134 games.

=== Milwaukee Brewers ===
On July 28, 2000, the Indians traded Sexson to the Milwaukee Brewers in a seven-player deal to get the Indians a closer and two starting pitchers.

In 2001, Sexson hit 45 home runs, which tied the Brewers record set by Gorman Thomas in 1979. His 178 strikeouts also broke the Brewers record, but this was surpassed the following season by José Hernández. On September 25, 2001, Sexson and teammate Jeromy Burnitz each hit three home runs in a 9–4 win against the Arizona Diamondbacks. It was the first, and, through the end of the 2024 season, only time that two players hit three home runs in the same game, let alone two teammates. In 2002, Sexson represented the Brewers in the MLB All-Star Game which was played in Milwaukee. In 2003, he played in all 162 games and again tied the Brewers record of 45 home runs while hitting .272 and earning a selection to the 2003 MLB All-Star Game. Prince Fielder broke Sexson's and Thomas's team record in 2007, hitting 50 home runs.

Sexson was the first of three players in Brewers history to have 100 or more RBIs in three consecutive seasons along with Fielder in 2007–2009 and Ryan Braun in 2008–10.

=== Arizona Diamondbacks ===
In December 2003, the Brewers traded Sexson along with pitcher Shane Nance and a player to be named later (Noochie Varner) to the Arizona Diamondbacks for infielders Junior Spivey, Craig Counsell, Lyle Overbay, catcher Chad Moeller, and pitchers Chris Capuano and Jorge de la Rosa. On April 26, Sexson hit his 200th career home run an estimated 503 feet off Cubs pitcher Francis Beltrán. Sexson missed most of the rest of the 2004 season after twice suffering a reverse subluxation of his left shoulder while attempting to check his swing.

=== Seattle Mariners ===
Prior to the 2005 season, Sexson signed a four-year contract with the Seattle Mariners worth $50 million. Sexson played well in the 2005 season, hitting 39 home runs and 121 RBIs and put up similar numbers the following year, hitting 34 home runs and 107 RBIs. However, Sexson struggled mightily in the 2007 season, batting .205 with 21 home runs and 63 RBIs, and again in the 2008 season, hitting just .218 with 11 home runs and 30 RBIs for Seattle.

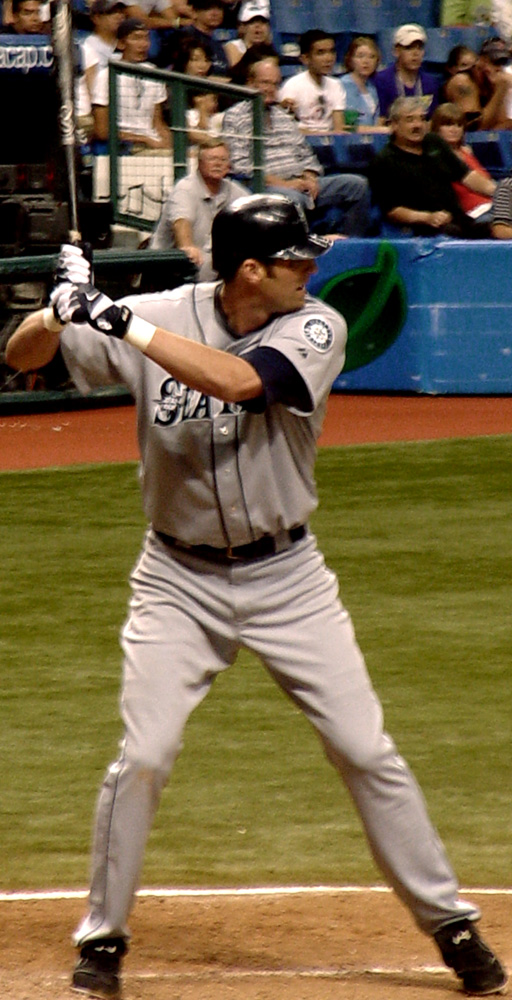
Sexson batting in 2005

On May 8, 2008, in a game against the Texas Rangers, Sexson charged the mound towards Rangers starting pitcher Kason Gabbard and threw his batting helmet at him after Gabbard threw a head-high pitch over the middle of the plate, to which Sexson reacted as if it had hit him. Sexson later stated he was frustrated and had a lot going on in his head, including his son being in the hospital and his club's recent struggles. He was suspended six games for the incident. He later appealed the suspension, and it was dropped to five games.

On July 10, 2008, Sexson was released by the Mariners.

=== New York Yankees ===
On July 18, 2008, Sexson signed with the New York Yankees. Sexson did well in his Yankee debut, by collecting his first hit as a Yankee in the first inning with a single and also bringing in Bobby Abreu for the first run that inning. He went 1–3 with one RBI, one walk, and one strikeout. His only home run (a grand slam) as a New York Yankee came on August 5, 2008, against the Texas Rangers. Sexson was designated for assignment on August 15, 2008, after batting .250 with one home run in 22 games for New York. He was released on August 24, 2008.

=== Windy City ThunderBolts ===
On October 20, 2022, Sexson was announced as the new field manager of the Windy City ThunderBolts. This was the first professional managerial position for Sexson after coaching at Summit High School in Bend, Oregon. Sexson's first coaching staff hire was Chris Coleman as the third base coach and infield coordinator. He led the team to a 43–52 record (.453 winning percentage), and stepped down from his role at the conclusion of the 2023 season.

== Personal life ==
In May 2005, Sexson pleaded guilty in Clark County, Washington, to second degree negligent driving after initially being charged with drunk driving. He was ordered to pay a $538 fine. Since 2014, he has been a baseball coach at Summit High School in Bend, Oregon.

== See also ==
- List of Major League Baseball career home run leaders

Awards and achievements
Preceded by David Bell	Indians' Minor League Player of the Year (the Lou Boudreau Award); 1995	Succeeded by Russell Branyan
