= 2000 Philadelphia Phillies season =

Major League Baseball season

2000 Philadelphia Phillies
- League: National League
- Division: East
- Ballpark: Veterans Stadium
- City: Philadelphia
- Record: 65–97 (.401)
- Divisional place: 5th
- Owners: Bill Giles
- General managers: Ed Wade
- Managers: Terry Francona
- Television: WPSG; CSN Philadelphia
- Radio: WPHT (Harry Kalas, Larry Andersen, Andy Musser, Chris Wheeler, Scott Graham)

The 2000 Philadelphia Phillies season was the 118th season in the history of the franchise.

== Offseason ==
- November 8, 1999: Jalal Leach was signed as a free agent with the Philadelphia Phillies.
- November 18, 1999: Mark Brownson was selected off waivers by the Philadelphia Phillies from the Colorado Rockies.
- December 12, 1999: Bobby Estalella was traded by the Philadelphia Phillies to the San Francisco Giants for Chris Brock.

== Regular season ==
The Phillies celebrated and honored the 50th anniversary of the 1950 Phillies pennant winning team team on August 8, 2000 prior to the Phillies game against the Baltimore Orioles.

=== Season standings ===
NL East
Team	W	L	Pct.	GB	Home	Road
Atlanta Braves	95	67	.586	—	51‍–‍30	44‍–‍37
New York Mets	94	68	.580	1	55‍–‍26	39‍–‍42
Florida Marlins	79	82	.491	15½	43‍–‍38	36‍–‍44
Montreal Expos	67	95	.414	28	37‍–‍44	30‍–‍51
Philadelphia Phillies	65	97	.401	30	34‍–‍47	31‍–‍50

=== Record vs. opponents ===
2000 National League record Source: NL Standings Head-to-Head
Team	AZ	ATL	CHC	CIN	COL	FLA	HOU	LAD	MIL	MON	NYM	PHI	PIT	SD	SF	STL	AL
Arizona	—	3–6	5–4	2–5	7–6	4–5	6–1	7–6	4–5	4–5	2–7	8–1	7–2	9–4	6–7	5–4	6–9
Atlanta	6–3	—	4–5	2–5	5–4	6–6	5–4	7–2	6–3	6–7	7–6	8–5	5–2	8–1	6–3	3–4	11–7
Chicago	4–5	5–4	—	4–8	4–5	1–6	5–7	3–6	6–7	4–5	2–5	6–3	3–9	3–5	4–5	3–10	8–7
Cincinnati	5–2	5–2	8–4	—	6–3	3–6	7–5	4–5	5–8–1	6–3	5–4	3–4	7–6	4–5	3–6	7–6	7–8
Colorado	6–7	4–5	5–4	3–6	—	4–5	5–4	4–9	4–5	7–2	3–6	6–3	7–2	7–6	6–7	5–3	6–6
Florida	5–4	6–6	6–1	6–3	5–4	—	3–5	2–7	3–4	7–6	6–6	9–4	5–4	2–7	3–6	3–6	8–9
Houston	1–6	4–5	7–5	5–7	4–5	5–3	—	3–6	7–6	4–5	2–5	5–4	10–3	2–7	1–8	6–6	6–9
Los Angeles	6–7	2–7	6–3	5–4	9–4	7–2	6–3	—	3–4	5–3	4–5	5–4	4–5	8–5	7–5	3–6	6–9
Milwaukee	5–4	3–6	7–6	8–5–1	5–4	4–3	6–7	4–3	—	4–5	2–7	2–5	7–5	2–7	3–6	5–7	6–9
Montreal	5–4	7–6	5–4	3–6	2–7	6–7	5–4	3–5	5–4	—	3–9	5–7	3–4	3–6	3–6	2–5	7–11
New York	7–2	6–7	5–2	4–5	6–3	6–6	5–2	5–4	7–2	9–3	—	6–7	7–2	3–6	3–5	6–3	9–9
Philadelphia	1–8	5–8	3–6	4–3	3–6	4–9	4–5	4–5	5–2	7–5	7–6	—	3–6	2–5	2–7	2–7	9–9
Pittsburgh	2–7	2–5	9–3	6–7	2–7	4–5	3–10	5–4	5–7	4–3	2–7	6–3	—	7–2	2–6	4–8	6–9
San Diego	4–9	1–8	5–3	5–4	6–7	7–2	7–2	5–8	7–2	6–3	6–3	5–2	2–7	—	5–7	0–9	5–10
San Francisco	7–6	3–6	5–4	6–3	7–6	6–3	8–1	5–7	6–3	6–3	5–3	7–2	6–2	7–5	—	5–4	8–7
St. Louis	4–5	4–3	10–3	6–7	3–5	6–3	6–6	6–3	7–5	5–2	3–6	7–2	8–4	9–0	4–5	—	7–8

=== Notable transactions ===
- June 5, 2000: Chase Utley was drafted by the Philadelphia Phillies in the 1st round (15th pick) of the 2000 amateur draft. Player signed July 29, 2000.
- June 28, 2000: Jalal Leach was released by the Philadelphia Phillies.
- July 26, 2000: Rob Ducey was traded by the Philadelphia Phillies to the Toronto Blue Jays for a player to be named later.
- July 26, 2000: Curt Schilling was traded by the Philadelphia Phillies to the Arizona Diamondbacks for Omar Daal, Nelson Figueroa, Travis Lee, and Vicente Padilla.
- July 29, 2000: Kent Bottenfield was traded by the Anaheim Angels to the Philadelphia Phillies for Ron Gant.
- August 3, 2000: Rico Brogna was selected off waivers by the Boston Red Sox from the Philadelphia Phillies.

=== Major league debuts ===
- Batters:
  - Clemente Álvarez (September 19)
  - Pat Burrell (May 24)
  - Jimmy Rollins (September 17)
  - Reggie Taylor (September 17)
- Pitchers:
  - Dave Coggin (June 23)
  - Tom Jacquez (September 9)
  - Doug Nickle (September 18)

=== 2000 game log ===
Legend
	Phillies win
	Phillies loss
	Postponement
**Bold**	Phillies team member

2000 game log
Overall Record: 65–97
April (7–17)

#	Date	Opponent	Score	Win	Loss	Save	Attendance	Record
1	April 4	@ Diamondbacks	4–6	Randy Johnson (1–0)	**Andy Ashby** (0–1)	Darren Holmes (1)	44,298	0–1
2	April 5	@ Diamondbacks	3–11	Todd Stottlemyre (1–0)	**Paul Byrd** (0–1)	Mike Morgan (1)	29,291	0–2
3	April 6	@ Diamondbacks	2–3 (11)	Russ Springer (1–0)	**Steve Schrenk** (0–1)	None	28,774	0–3
4	April 7	@ Astros	4–1	**Randy Wolf** (1–0)	Octavio Dotel (0–1)	**Wayne Gomes** (1)	41,583	1–3
5	April 8	@ Astros	5–8	Mike Maddux (1–0)	**Chris Brock** (0–1)	Billy Wagner (2)	39,018	1–4
6	April 9	@ Astros	3–2	**Steve Schrenk** (1–1)	Jay Powell (0–1)	**Wayne Gomes** (2)	38,784	2–4
7	April 10	Mets	9–7	**Amaury Telemaco** (1–0)	Rich Rodriguez (0–1)	**Wayne Gomes** (3)	47,115	3–4
8	April 12	Mets	8–5	**Robert Person** (1–0)	Mike Hampton (0–3)	**Wayne Gomes** (4)	15,269	4–4
9	April 13	Mets	1–2	Dennis Cook (2–0)	**Scott Aldred** (0–1)	Armando Benítez (3)	14,552	4–5
10	April 14	Expos	0–4	Dustin Hermanson (1–1)	**Chris Brock** (0–2)	None	12,366	4–6
–	April 15	Expos	Postponed (rain); Makeup: April 17					
11	April 16	Expos	5–4	**Scott Aldred** (1–1)	Anthony Telford (2–1)	None	18,648	5–6
–	April 17	Expos	Postponed (rain); Makeup: September 11 as a traditional double-header					
12	April 18	@ Braves	3–4 (12)	Luis Rivera (1–0)	**Carlos Reyes** (0–1)	None	34,903	5–7
13	April 19	@ Braves	1–10	Tom Glavine (3–0)	**Randy Wolf** (1–1)	None	29,992	5–8
14	April 20	@ Braves	4–6	Kevin Millwood (1–0)	**Scott Aldred** (1–2)	John Rocker (1)	31,451	5–9
15	April 21	@ Marlins	4–3	**Andy Ashby** (1–1)	Vladimir Núñez (0–2)	None	15,478	6–9
16	April 22	@ Marlins	2–4	Jesús Sánchez (3–0)	**Paul Byrd** (0–2)	Antonio Alfonseca (6)	22,787	6–10
17	April 23	@ Marlins	2–5	Brad Penny (3–1)	**Robert Person** (1–1)	Antonio Alfonseca (7)	11,442	6–11
18	April 24	@ Marlins	1–3	Alex Fernandez (3–2)	**Randy Wolf** (1–2)	Antonio Alfonseca (8)	9,344	6–12
19	April 25	Diamondbacks	2–10	Randy Johnson (5–0)	**Chris Brock** (0–3)	None	11,926	6–13
20	April 26	Diamondbacks	4–10	Todd Stottlemyre (4–1)	**Andy Ashby** (1–2)	None	12,250	6–14
21	April 27	Diamondbacks	5–4	**Wayne Gomes** (1–0)	Byung-hyun Kim (0–1)	None	13,560	7–14
22	April 28	Cardinals	4–7	Garrett Stephenson (3–0)	**Carlos Reyes** (0–2)	Dave Veres (5)	25,877	7–15
23	April 29	Cardinals	6–7 (10)	Mike Mohler (1–1)	**Wayne Gomes** (1–1)	None	23,031	7–16
24	April 30	Cardinals	3–4	Darryl Kile (5–1)	**Curt Schilling** (0–1)	Mike James (1)	34,033	7–17

May (11–16)

#	Date	Opponent	Score	Win	Loss	Save	Attendance	Record
25	May 2	Reds	0–7	Denny Neagle (3–0)	**Andy Ashby** (1–3)	Scott Sullivan (2)	23,234	7–18
26	May 3	Reds	5–2	**Paul Byrd** (1–2)	Steve Parris (1–4)	None	23,260	8–18
27	May 4	Reds	14–1	**Robert Person** (2–1)	Pete Harnisch (0–4)	None	27,564	9–18
28	May 5	@ Braves	5–6	Rudy Seánez (1–0)	**Wayne Gomes** (1–2)	None	40,174	9–19
29	May 6	@ Braves	6–0	**Curt Schilling** (1–1)	Kevin Millwood (3–1)	None	48,610	10–19
30	May 7	@ Braves	7–4	**Andy Ashby** (2–3)	Terry Mulholland (3–3)	**Wayne Gomes** (5)	40,613	11–19
31	May 9	@ Expos	2–3	Steve Kline (1–0)	**Wayne Gomes** (1–3)	None	8,845	11–20
32	May 10	@ Expos	8–0	**Robert Person** (3–1)	Javier Vázquez (3–1)	None	9,411	12–20
33	May 11	@ Expos	6–4	**Randy Wolf** (2–2)	Carl Pavano (3–1)	**Wayne Gomes** (6)	8,311	13–20
34	May 12	Braves	7–8	Kerry Ligtenberg (1–1)	**Wayne Gomes** (1–4)	John Rocker (8)	21,922	13–21
35	May 13	Braves	2–3 (10)	Rudy Seánez (2–1)	**Scott Aldred** (1–3)	John Rocker (9)	20,516	13–22
36	May 14	Braves	2–11	John Burkett (2–2)	**Paul Byrd** (1–3)	None	22,258	13–23
37	May 16	Cardinals	2–8	Andy Benes (3–2)	**Robert Person** (3–2)	None	18,399	13–24
38	May 17	Cardinals	5–4	**Randy Wolf** (3–2)	Heathcliff Slocumb (1–3)	**Jeff Brantley** (1)	18,941	14–24
39	May 18	Cardinals	2–7	Garrett Stephenson (6–0)	**Curt Schilling** (1–2)	None	17,137	14–25
40	May 19	Rockies	2–10	Pedro Astacio (5–2)	**Andy Ashby** (2–4)	None	14,202	14–26
41	May 20	Rockies	3–4	Julián Tavárez (3–2)	**Chris Brock** (0–4)	José Jiménez (6)	19,192	14–27
42	May 21	Rockies	4–3	**Robert Person** (4–2)	Masato Yoshii (1–5)	**Jeff Brantley** (2)	20,612	15–27
43	May 23	@ Astros	2–10	Chris Holt (2–6)	**Randy Wolf** (3–3)	None	33,381	15–28
44	May 24	@ Astros	9–7	**Wayne Gomes** (2–4)	Billy Wagner (1–3)	**Jeff Brantley** (3)	32,665	16–28
45	May 25	@ Astros	6–10	Scott Elarton (3–1)	**Andy Ashby** (2–5)	Joe Slusarski (1)	34,736	16–29
46	May 26	@ Dodgers	4–11	Kevin Brown (4–1)	**Paul Byrd** (1–4)	None	37,048	16–30
47	May 27	@ Dodgers	7–6	**Robert Person** (5–2)	Darren Dreifort (3–2)	**Jeff Brantley** (4)	33,967	17–30
48	May 28	@ Dodgers	4–2	**Randy Wolf** (4–3)	Antonio Osuna (0–1)	None	28,603	18–30
49	May 29	@ Giants	2–7	Shawn Estes (4–2)	**Curt Schilling** (1–3)	Alan Embree (1)	40,930	18–31
50	May 30	@ Giants	3–7	Liván Hernández (4–5)	**Andy Ashby** (2–6)	Robb Nen (8)	40,930	18–32
51	May 31	@ Giants	4–10	Mark Gardner (4–2)	**Paul Byrd** (1–5)	None	40,930	18–33

June (15–11)

#	Date	Opponent	Score	Win	Loss	Save	Attendance	Record
52	June 2	Red Sox	2–1 (11)	**Jeff Brantley** (1–0)	John Wasdin (0–2)	None	22,194	19–33
53	June 3	Red Sox	9–3	**Randy Wolf** (5–3)	Tim Wakefield (1–4)	None	31,131	20–33
54	June 4	Red Sox	6–5 (12)	**Steve Schrenk** (2–1)	Rhéal Cormier (2–1)	None	27,382	21–33
55	June 5	Devil Rays	3–5 (12)	Mark Guthrie (3–3)	**Jason Boyd** (0–1)	Rick White (1)	13,237	21–34
56	June 6	Devil Rays	3–5 (10)	Roberto Hernández (2–2)	**Jeff Brantley** (1–1)	Rick White (2)	13,415	21–35
57	June 7	Devil Rays	5–4	**Chris Brock** (1–4)	Mark Guthrie (3–4)	**Jeff Brantley** (5)	20,514	22–35
58	June 9	@ Orioles	9–5	**Randy Wolf** (6–3)	Pat Rapp (4–4)	None	47,218	23–35
59	June 10	@ Orioles	4–11	Sidney Ponson (4–3)	**Curt Schilling** (1–4)	None	48,443	23–36
60	June 11	@ Orioles	2–7	Mike Mussina (4–6)	**Andy Ashby** (2–7)	None	47,540	23–37
61	June 12	Marlins	2–5	Vic Darensbourg (3–0)	**Cliff Politte** (0–1)	Antonio Alfonseca (19)	11,926	23–38
62	June 13	Marlins	4–3	**Wayne Gomes** (3–4)	Joe Strong (0–1)	**Jeff Brantley** (6)	13,316	24–38
63	June 14	Marlins	1–8	Ryan Dempster (7–4)	**Randy Wolf** (6–4)	None	14,472	24–39
64	June 16	Braves	2–1	**Curt Schilling** (2–4)	Tom Glavine (7–3)	**Jeff Brantley** (7)	20,495	25–39
65	June 17	Braves	9–3	**Cliff Politte** (1–1)	Terry Mulholland (6–6)	None	37,292	26–39
66	June 18	Braves	3–5	John Burkett (5–3)	**Steve Schrenk** (2–2)	John Rocker (11)	25,359	26–40
67	June 19	Braves	5–2	**Chris Brock** (2–4)	Mike Remlinger (2–2)	**Jeff Brantley** (8)	22,264	27–40
68	June 20	@ Mets	3–2 (10)	**Chris Brock** (3–4)	Armando Benítez (1–3)	**Jeff Brantley** (9)	40,386	28–40
69	June 21	@ Mets	10–5	**Wayne Gomes** (4–4)	John Franco (2–3)	None	22,524	29–40
70	June 22	@ Mets	4–5	Glendon Rusch (5–5)	**Cliff Politte** (1–2)	Dennis Cook (1)	21,005	29–41
71	June 23	@ Expos	13–6	**David Coggin** (1–0)	Javier Vázquez (6–4)	None	8,197	30–41
72	June 24	@ Expos	8–1	**Randy Wolf** (7–4)	Carl Pavano (8–4)	None	8,374	31–41
73	June 25	@ Expos	1–3	Mike Johnson (3–2)	**Paul Byrd** (1–6)	Steve Kline (8)	13,164	31–42
74	June 27	Brewers	7–0	**Curt Schilling** (3–4)	Jimmy Haynes (7–7)	None	15,256	32–42
75	June 28	Brewers	9–7	**Chris Brock** (4–4)	Juan Acevedo (0–3)	**Jeff Brantley** (10)	13,520	33–42
76	June 29	Brewers	6–8	Jason Bere (5–6)	**Steve Schrenk** (2–3)	Curtis Leskanic (1)	21,597	33–43
77	June 30	Pirates	3–8	Kris Benson (7–6)	**Randy Wolf** (7–5)	None	38,221	33–44

July (13–14)

#	Date	Opponent	Score	Win	Loss	Save	Attendance	Record
78	July 1	Pirates	4–3	**Paul Byrd** (2–6)	Bronson Arroyo (0–2)	**Jeff Brantley** (11)	48,406	34–44
79	July 2	Pirates	9–1	**Curt Schilling** (4–4)	Todd Ritchie (5–5)	None	20,290	35–44
80	July 3	@ Brewers	5–3	**Andy Ashby** (3–7)	John Snyder (3–3)	**Jeff Brantley** (12)	13,903	36–44
81	July 4	@ Brewers	7–4	**Chris Brock** (5–4)	Bob Wickman (2–2)	**Jeff Brantley** (13)	14,602	37–44
82	July 5	@ Brewers	5–2	**Randy Wolf** (8–5)	Jamey Wright (4–2)	**Wayne Gomes** (7)	10,677	38–44
83	July 6	@ Brewers	2–4	Jeff D'Amico (4–4)	**Paul Byrd** (2–7)	Bob Wickman (12)	12,578	38–45
84	July 7	Orioles	1–2	Mike Mussina (6–7)	**Curt Schilling** (4–5)	Mike Timlin (8)	21,882	38–46
85	July 8	Orioles	13–4	**Andy Ashby** (4–7)	José Mercedes (3–4)	None	28,385	39–46
86	July 9	Orioles	4–5	Alan Mills (3–1)	**Jeff Brantley** (1–2)	Mike Timlin (9)	28,100	39–47
–	July 11	**2000 Major League Baseball All-Star Game at Turner Field in Atlanta**						
87	July 13	@ Blue Jays	8–5	**Curt Schilling** (5–5)	Chris Carpenter (7–8)	**Jeff Brantley** (14)	22,163	40–47
88	July 14	@ Blue Jays	2–3	Billy Koch (5–1)	**Jeff Brantley** (1–3)	None	21,385	40–48
89	July 15	@ Blue Jays	7–3	**Bruce Chen** (5–0)	David Wells (15–3)	None	24,828	41–48
90	July 16	@ Yankees	8–9 (10)	Mariano Rivera (3–3)	**Jeff Brantley** (1–4)	None	53,131	41–49
91	July 17	@ Yankees	10–8	**David Coggin** (2–0)	David Cone (1–8)	**Chris Brock** (1)	38,987	42–49
92	July 18	@ Yankees	1–3	Denny Neagle (9–2)	**Curt Schilling** (5–6)	Mariano Rivera (22)	40,013	42–50
93	July 19	@ Cubs	4–5	Félix Heredia (4–3)	**Mark Holzemer** (0–1)	None	39,390	42–51
94	July 20	@ Cubs	3–2	**Mark Brownson** (1–0)	Kevin Tapani (6–8)	**Jeff Brantley** (15)	38,848	43–51
95	July 21	@ Pirates	2–9	Jimmy Anderson (3–5)	**Paul Byrd** (2–8)	None	22,438	43–52
96	July 22	@ Pirates	1–2	Bronson Arroyo (1–3)	**Robert Person** (5–3)	Mike Williams (14)	28,485	43–53
97	July 23	@ Pirates	4–1	**Curt Schilling** (6–6)	Todd Ritchie (5–6)	None	23,840	44–53
98	July 25	Cubs	7–8	Tim Worrell (3–3)	**Chris Brock** (5–5)	Rick Aguilera (22)	22,065	44–54
99	July 26	Cubs	9–14	Félix Heredia (6–3)	**Paul Byrd** (2–9)	None	17,825	44–55
100	July 27	Cubs	1–4	Steve Rain (2–0)	**Vicente Padilla** (2–2)	Rick Aguilera (23)	30,722	44–56
101	July 28	Dodgers	0–2	Darren Dreifort (7–7)	**Omar Daal** (2–11)	Jeff Shaw (16)	20,110	44–57
102	July 29	Dodgers	3–0	**Cliff Politte** (2–2)	Kevin Brown (10–4)	**Jeff Brantley** (16)	35,189	45–57
103	July 30	Dodgers	3–2	**Randy Wolf** (9–5)	Chan Ho Park (11–8)	**Jeff Brantley** (17)	23,301	46–57
104	July 31	@ Padres	1–4	Woody Williams (6–3)	**Bruce Chen** (5–1)	None	43,207	46–58

August (10–18)

#	Date	Opponent	Score	Win	Loss	Save	Attendance	Record
105	August 1	@ Padres	9–10 (10)	Carlos Almanzar (2–3)	**Jeff Brantley** (1–5)	None	18,274	46–59
106	August 2	@ Padres	2–5	Matt Clement (10–10)	**Omar Daal** (2–12)	Trevor Hoffman (26)	14,447	46–60
107	August 4	@ Rockies	1–8	Julián Tavárez (7–2)	**Kent Bottenfield** (7–9)	None	42,827	46–61
108	August 5	@ Rockies	6–7	José Jiménez (5–0)	**Jeff Brantley** (1–6)	None	40,979	46–62
109	August 6	@ Rockies	10–9	**Bruce Chen** (6–1)	Pedro Astacio (9–8)	None	38,278	47–62
110	August 7	Padres	4–6	Matt Clement (11–10)	**Robert Person** (5–4)	Trevor Hoffman (30)	13,353	47–63
111	August 8	Padres	10–4	**Omar Daal** (3–12)	Brian Tollberg (2–2)	None	14,181	48–63
112	August 9	Padres	3–2	**Chris Brock** (6–5)	Heathcliff Slocumb (2–4)	None	16,541	49–63
113	August 10	Padres	3–15	Woody Williams (7–4)	**Randy Wolf** (9–6)	None	15,681	49–64
114	August 11	Astros	2–7	Marc Valdes (3–4)	**Vicente Padilla** (2–3)	None	15,551	49–65
115	August 12	Astros	3–2	**Robert Person** (6–4)	Wade Miller (1–4)	**Jeff Brantley** (18)	21,188	50–65
116	August 13	Astros	7–14	José Cabrera (1–2)	**Omar Daal** (3–13)	None	20,129	50–66
117	August 14	Diamondbacks	3–4 (11)	Dan Plesac (2–0)	**Jeff Brantley** (1–7)	Matt Mantei (10)	14,083	50–67
118	August 15	Diamondbacks	6–11	Byung-hyun Kim (3–5)	**Wayne Gomes** (4–5)	None	16,949	50–68
119	August 16	Diamondbacks	1–5	Armando Reynoso (10–7)	**Bruce Chen** (6–2)	None	23,498	50–69
120	August 18	@ Cardinals	6–7	Jason Christiansen (3–8)	**Chris Brock** (6–6)	None	46,253	50–70
121	August 19	@ Cardinals	3–6	Pat Hentgen (12–9)	**Omar Daal** (3–14)	None	47,163	50–71
122	August 20	@ Cardinals	6–0	**Kent Bottenfield** (8–9)	Britt Reames (0–1)	None	43,000	51–71
123	August 21	@ Reds	4–7	Pete Harnisch (5–6)	**Randy Wolf** (9–7)	Danny Graves (21)	21,558	51–72
124	August 22	@ Reds	5–4	**Vicente Padilla** (3–3)	Larry Luebbers (0–2)	**Jeff Brantley** (19)	22,470	52–72
125	August 23	@ Reds	4–3	**Chris Brock** (7–6)	Danny Graves (10–4)	**Vicente Padilla** (1)	20,255	53–72
126	August 24	@ Reds	3–8	Steve Parris (8–14)	**Omar Daal** (3–15)	None	25,745	53–73
127	August 25	@ Giants	3–16	Russ Ortiz (10–10)	**Kent Bottenfield** (8–10)	None	18,384	53–74
128	August 26	@ Giants	5–2	**Randy Wolf** (10–7)	Kirk Rueter (8–9)	**Jeff Brantley** (20)	19,636	54–74
129	August 27	@ Giants	2–1 (10)	**Ed Vosberg** (1–0)	Aaron Fultz (3–2)	None	18,717	55–74
130	August 28	Rockies	3–2	**Robert Person** (7–4)	Masato Yoshii (5–14)	**Jeff Brantley** (21)	14,118	56–74
131	August 29	Rockies	1–2	Brian Rose (5–7)	**Omar Daal** (3–16)	José Jiménez (17)	14,862	56–75
132	August 30	Rockies	4–5 (11)	Gabe White (9–1)	**Wayne Gomes** (4–6)	José Jiménez (18)	14,150	56–76

September (9–20)

#	Date	Opponent	Score	Win	Loss	Save	Attendance	Record
133	September 1	@ Dodgers	1–2	Mike Fetters (6–2)	**Chris Brock** (7–7)	Jeff Shaw (23)	28,383	56–77
134	September 2	@ Dodgers	0–1 (10)	Matt Herges (9–3)	**Vicente Padilla** (3–4)	None	37,244	56–78
135	September 3	@ Dodgers	1–6	Chan Ho Park (15–8)	**Robert Person** (7–5)	Jeff Shaw (24)	38,150	56–79
136	September 4	@ Giants	0–3	Russ Ortiz (12–10)	**Omar Daal** (3–17)	Robb Nen (34)	40,930	56–80
137	September 5	@ Giants	5–8	John Johnstone (3–4)	**Ed Vosberg** (1–1)	Robb Nen (35)	40,930	56–81
138	September 6	@ Giants	4–5	Aaron Fultz (4–2)	**Vicente Padilla** (3–5)	Alan Embree (2)	40,930	56–82
139	September 8	@ Mets	2–0	**Vicente Padilla** (4–5)	Mike Hampton (13–9)	**Jeff Brantley** (22)	38,808	57–82
140	September 9	@ Mets	6–3	**Robert Person** (8–5)	Turk Wendell (7–5)	None	42,324	58–82
141	September 10	@ Mets	0–3	Al Leiter (15–7)	**Omar Daal** (3–18)	None	53,775	58–83
142	September 11 (1)	Expos	5–2	**Cliff Politte** (3–2)	Dustin Hermanson (11–13)	**Jeff Brantley** (23)	see 2nd game	59–83
143	September 11 (2)	Expos	6–7	Guillermo Mota (1–1)	**Vicente Padilla** (4–6)	Scott Strickland (5)	11,310	59–84
144	September 12	Expos	0–1	Tony Armas Jr. (5–8)	**Amaury Telemaco** (1–1)	Scott Strickland (6)	12,135	59–85
145	September 13	Expos	15–5	**Bruce Chen** (7–2)	Felipe Lira (4–6)	None	12,316	60–85
146	September 15	Marlins	7–4	**Robert Person** (9–5)	A. J. Burnett (2–6)	None	13,064	61–85
147	September 16	Marlins	2–3	Brad Penny (6–7)	**Omar Daal** (3–19)	Antonio Alfonseca (41)	15,255	61–86
148	September 17	Marlins	6–5	**Randy Wolf** (11–7)	Chuck Smith (4–6)	**Thomas Jacquez** (1)	15,486	62–86
149	September 18	Pirates	5–6	Rich Loiselle (1–3)	**Vicente Padilla** (4–7)	Mike Williams (20)	11,470	62–87
150	September 19	Pirates	8–12	Matt Skrmetta (2–2)	**Amaury Telemaco** (1–2)	Mike Williams (21)	11,362	62–88
151	September 20	Pirates	6–7 (10)	Rich Loiselle (2–3)	**Chris Brock** (7–8)	Mike Williams (22)	12,762	62–89
152	September 21	Mets	6–5	**Jeff Brantley** (2–7)	Rick White (5–9)	None	17,769	63–89
153	September 22	Mets	6–9	Bobby J. Jones (10–6)	**Randy Wolf** (11–8)	Armando Benítez (39)	21,128	63–90
154	September 23	Mets	3–7	Mike Hampton (14–10)	**Cliff Politte** (3–3)	None	22,570	63–91
155	September 24	Mets	2–3	Glendon Rusch (11–11)	**Bruce Chen** (7–3)	Armando Benítez (40)	31,391	63–92
156	September 25	@ Cubs	3–4	Rubén Quevedo (3–9)	**Robert Person** (9–6)	Tim Worrell (2)	26,104	63–93
157	September 26	@ Cubs	10–4	**Omar Daal** (4–19)	Jon Lieber (12–11)	None	26,055	64–93
158	September 27	@ Cubs	0–1	Kerry Wood (8–7)	**Randy Wolf** (11–9)	Tim Worrell (3)	28,180	64–94
159	September 28	@ Cubs	4–2	**Cliff Politte** (4–3)	Joey Nation (0–2)	**Vicente Padilla** (2)	22,916	65–94
160	September 29	@ Marlins	1–7	Chuck Smith (6–6)	**Bruce Chen** (7–4)	None	15,816	65–95
161	September 30	@ Marlins	5–11	Reid Cornelius (4–10)	**Robert Person** (9–7)	None	23,882	65–96

October (0–1)

#	Date	Opponent	Score	Win	Loss	Save	Attendance	Record
162	October 1	@ Marlins	5–7	Ryan Dempster (14–10)	**Amaury Telemaco** (1–3)	Antonio Alfonseca (45)	21,055	65–97

=== Roster ===
2000 Philadelphia Phillies
**Roster**
**Pitchers**: 30 Scott Aldred; 43 Andy Ashby; 21 Kent Bottenfield; 41 Jason Boyd; 45 Jeff Brantley; 55 Chris Brock; 49 Mark Brownson; 33 Kirk Bullinger; 34 Paul Byrd; 39 Bruce Chen; 72 David Coggin; 37 Omar Daal; 61 Wayne Gomes; 46 Mark Holzemer; 43 Tom Jacquez; 46 Trever Miller; 78 Doug Nickle; 44 Vicente Padilla; 31 Robert Person; 35 Cliff Politte; 44 Carlos Reyes; 38 Curt Schilling; 52 Steve Schrenk; 47 Amaury Telemaco; 50 Ed Vosberg; 37 Bryan Ward; 54 Randy Wolf	**Catchers**: 15 Clemente Álvarez; 14 Gary Bennett; 24 Mike Lieberthal; 12 Tom Prince; **Infielders**: 16 Marlon Anderson; 26 Alex Arias; 2 Rico Brogna; 33 Pat Burrell; 19 Brian Hunter; 23 Kevin Jordan; 10 Travis Lee; 12 Mickey Morandini; 27 David Newhan; 13 Tomás Pérez; 28 Chris Pritchett; 8 Desi Relaford; 17 Scott Rolen; 29 Jimmy Rollins	**Outfielders**: 53 Bobby Abreu; 25 Rob Ducey; 5 Ron Gant; 6 Doug Glanville; 11 Kevin Sefcik; 63 Reggie Taylor	**Manager**: 7 Terry Francona; **Coaches**: 40 Galen Cisco (Pitching); 3 Chuck Cottier; 59 Ramon Henderson (Bullpen); 56 Hal McRae (Batting); 9 Brad Mills (First Base); 18 John Vukovich

== Player stats ==
=== Batting ===
==== Starters by position ====
Note: Pos = Position; G = Games played; AB = At bats; H = Hits; Avg. = Batting average; HR = Home runs; RBI = Runs batted in

Pos	Player	G	AB	H	Avg.	HR	RBI
C	Mike Lieberthal	108	389	108	.278	15	71
1B	Pat Burrell	111	408	106	.260	18	79
2B	Mickey Morandini	91	302	76	.252	0	22
SS	Desi Relaford	83	253	56	.221	3	30
3B	Scott Rolen	128	483	144	.298	26	89
LF	Ron Gant	89	343	87	.254	20	38
CF	Doug Glanville	154	637	175	.275	8	52
RF	Bobby Abreu	154	576	182	.316	25	79

==== Other batters ====
Note: G = Games played; AB = At bats; H = Hits; Avg. = Batting average; HR = Home runs; RBI = Runs batted in

Player	G	AB	H	Avg.	HR	RBI
Kevin Jordan	109	337	74	.220	5	36
Travis Lee	56	180	43	.239	1	14
Marlon Anderson	41	162	37	.228	1	15
Alex Arias	70	155	29	.187	2	15
Kevin Sefcik	99	153	36	.235	0	10
Rob Ducey	112	152	30	.197	6	25
Tomás Pérez	45	140	31	.221	1	13
Brian Hunter	85	138	29	.210	7	22
Rico Brogna	38	129	32	.248	1	13
Tom Prince	46	122	29	.238	2	16
Gary Bennett	31	74	18	.243	2	5
Jimmy Rollins	14	53	17	.321	0	5
David Newhan	10	17	3	.176	0	0
Chris Pritchett	5	11	1	.091	0	0
Reggie Taylor	9	11	1	.091	0	0
Clemente Álvarez	2	5	1	.200	0	0

=== Pitching ===
==== Starting pitchers ====
Note: G = Games pitched; IP = Innings pitched; W = Wins; L = Losses; ERA = Earned run average; SO = Strikeouts

Player	G	IP	W	L	ERA	SO
Randy Wolf	32	206.1	11	9	4.36	160
Robert Person	28	173.1	9	7	3.63	164
Curt Schilling	16	112.2	6	6	3.91	96
Andy Ashby	16	101.1	4	7	5.68	51
Bruce Chen	15	94.1	3	4	3.63	80
Paul Byrd	17	83.0	2	9	6.51	53
Omar Daal	12	71.0	2	9	4.69	51
Kent Bottenfield	8	44.0	1	2	4.50	31
Dave Coggin	5	27.0	2	0	5.33	17

==== Other pitchers ====
Note: G = Games pitched; IP = Innings pitched; W = Wins; L = Losses; ERA = Earned run average; SO = Strikeouts

Player	G	IP	W	L	ERA	SO
Cliff Politte	12	59.0	4	3	3.66	50
Amaury Telemaco	13	24.1	1	3	6.66	22

==== Relief pitchers ====
Note: G = Games pitched; W = Wins; L = Losses; SV = Saves; ERA = Earned run average; SO = Strikeouts

Player	G	W	L	SV	ERA	SO
Jeff Brantley	55	2	7	23	5.86	57
Wayne Gomes	65	4	6	7	4.40	49
Chris Brock	63	7	8	1	4.34	69
Ed Vosberg	31	1	1	0	4.13	23
Jason Boyd	30	0	1	0	6.55	32
Vicente Padilla	28	2	6	2	5.34	21
Mark Holzemer	25	0	1	0	7.71	19
Scott Aldred	23	1	3	0	5.75	21
Steve Schrenk	20	2	3	0	7.33	19
Bryan Ward	20	0	0	0	2.33	11
Trever Miller	14	0	0	0	8.36	10
Carlos Reyes	10	0	2	0	5.23	4
Tom Jacquez	9	0	0	1	11.05	6
Doug Nickle	4	0	0	0	13.50	0
Kirk Bullinger	3	0	0	0	5.40	4
Mark Brownson	2	1	0	0	7.20	3

== Farm system ==
Level	Team	League	Manager
AAA	Scranton/Wilkes-Barre; Red Barons	International League	Marc Bombard
AA	Reading Phillies	Eastern League	Gary Varsho
A	Clearwater Phillies	Florida State League	Ken Oberkfell
A	Piedmont Boll Weevils	South Atlantic League	Greg Legg
A-Short Season	Batavia Muckdogs	New York–Penn League	Frank Klebe
Rookie	GCL Phillies	Gulf Coast League	Ramón Avilés
