= 2000 Chicago Cubs season =

2000 Chicago Cubs
- League: National League
- Division: Central
- Ballpark: Wrigley Field
- City: Chicago
- Record: 65–97 (.401)
- Divisional place: 6th
- Owners: Tribune Company
- General managers: Ed Lynch, Andy MacPhail
- Managers: Don Baylor
- Television: WGN-TV/Superstation WGN/Fox Sports Chicago (Chip Caray, Steve Stone)
- Radio: WGN (Pat Hughes, Ron Santo, Andy Masur)
- Stats: ESPN.com; Baseball Reference

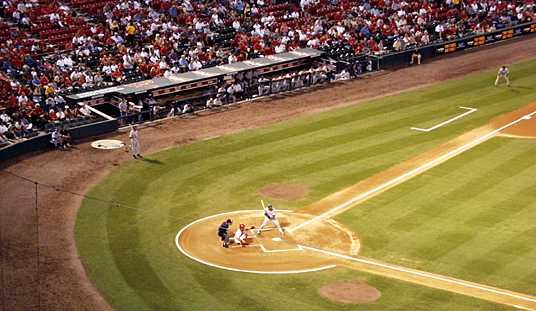
Sammy Sosa at bat during a September 2000 away game against the season's eventual National League Central Division champions St. Louis Cardinals at Busch Memorial Stadium.

The 2000 Chicago Cubs season was the 129th season of the Chicago Cubs franchise, the 125th in the National League and the 85th at Wrigley Field. The Cubs finished sixth and last in the National League Central with a record of 65–97.

During this season, the Cubs played in the first game held outside North America on Opening Day. The Cubs played the New York Mets in front of over 55,000 at the Tokyo Dome in Japan. The Cubs won the game by a score of 5–3.

== Offseason ==
- October 5, 1999: Lance Johnson was released by the Chicago Cubs.
- November 22, 1999: Todd Van Poppel signed as a free agent with the Chicago Cubs.

== Regular season ==
On May 11, 2000, Glenallen Hill was responsible for a memorable event in the annals of Chicago Cubs baseball lore. On that day, Hill became the first and so far only player to hit a pitched ball onto the roof of a five-story residential building across the street from the left field wall of Wrigley Field.

Sammy Sosa, despite hitting only 50 home runs (he had hit over 60 the previous two seasons), won his only home run crown.

=== Season standings ===
NL Central
Team	W	L	Pct.	GB	Home	Road
St. Louis Cardinals	95	67	.586	—	50‍–‍31	45‍–‍36
Cincinnati Reds	85	77	.525	10	43‍–‍38	42‍–‍39
Milwaukee Brewers	73	89	.451	22	42‍–‍39	31‍–‍50
Houston Astros	72	90	.444	23	39‍–‍42	33‍–‍48
Pittsburgh Pirates	69	93	.426	26	37‍–‍44	32‍–‍49
Chicago Cubs	65	97	.401	30	38‍–‍43	27‍–‍54

=== Record vs. opponents ===
2000 National League record Source: NL Standings Head-to-Head
Team	AZ	ATL	CHC	CIN	COL	FLA	HOU	LAD	MIL	MON	NYM	PHI	PIT	SD	SF	STL	AL
Arizona	—	3–6	5–4	2–5	7–6	4–5	6–1	7–6	4–5	4–5	2–7	8–1	7–2	9–4	6–7	5–4	6–9
Atlanta	6–3	—	4–5	2–5	5–4	6–6	5–4	7–2	6–3	6–7	7–6	8–5	5–2	8–1	6–3	3–4	11–7
Chicago	4–5	5–4	—	4–8	4–5	1–6	5–7	3–6	6–7	4–5	2–5	6–3	3–9	3–5	4–5	3–10	8–7
Cincinnati	5–2	5–2	8–4	—	6–3	3–6	7–5	4–5	5–8–1	6–3	5–4	3–4	7–6	4–5	3–6	7–6	7–8
Colorado	6–7	4–5	5–4	3–6	—	4–5	5–4	4–9	4–5	7–2	3–6	6–3	7–2	7–6	6–7	5–3	6–6
Florida	5–4	6–6	6–1	6–3	5–4	—	3–5	2–7	3–4	7–6	6–6	9–4	5–4	2–7	3–6	3–6	8–9
Houston	1–6	4–5	7–5	5–7	4–5	5–3	—	3–6	7–6	4–5	2–5	5–4	10–3	2–7	1–8	6–6	6–9
Los Angeles	6–7	2–7	6–3	5–4	9–4	7–2	6–3	—	3–4	5–3	4–5	5–4	4–5	8–5	7–5	3–6	6–9
Milwaukee	5–4	3–6	7–6	8–5–1	5–4	4–3	6–7	4–3	—	4–5	2–7	2–5	7–5	2–7	3–6	5–7	6–9
Montreal	5–4	7–6	5–4	3–6	2–7	6–7	5–4	3–5	5–4	—	3–9	5–7	3–4	3–6	3–6	2–5	7–11
New York	7–2	6–7	5–2	4–5	6–3	6–6	5–2	5–4	7–2	9–3	—	6–7	7–2	3–6	3–5	6–3	9–9
Philadelphia	1–8	5–8	3–6	4–3	3–6	4–9	4–5	4–5	5–2	7–5	7–6	—	3–6	2–5	2–7	2–7	9–9
Pittsburgh	2–7	2–5	9–3	6–7	2–7	4–5	3–10	5–4	5–7	4–3	2–7	6–3	—	7–2	2–6	4–8	6–9
San Diego	4–9	1–8	5–3	5–4	6–7	7–2	7–2	5–8	7–2	6–3	6–3	5–2	2–7	—	5–7	0–9	5–10
San Francisco	7–6	3–6	5–4	6–3	7–6	6–3	8–1	5–7	6–3	6–3	5–3	7–2	6–2	7–5	—	5–4	8–7
St. Louis	4–5	4–3	10–3	6–7	3–5	6–3	6–6	6–3	7–5	5–2	3–6	7–2	8–4	9–0	4–5	—	7–8

=== Notable Transactions ===
- June 5, 2000: Dontrelle Willis was drafted by the Chicago Cubs in the 8th round of the 2000 amateur draft. Player signed July 6, 2000.
- July 21, 2000: Glenallen Hill was traded by the Chicago Cubs to the New York Yankees for Ben Ford and Oswaldo Mairena.
- July 31, 2000: Henry Rodriguez was traded by the Chicago Cubs to the Florida Marlins for Ross Gload and Dave Noyce (minors).

== Roster ==
2000 Chicago Cubs
Roster
Pitchers: 38 Rick Aguilera; 55 Jamie Arnold; 35,37 Scott Downs; 44 Kyle Farnsworth; 76 Daniel Garibay; 30 Mark Guthrie; 49 Félix Heredia; 52 Matt Karchner; 32 Jon Lieber; 55 Andrew Lorraine; 40 Oswaldo Mairena; 52 Joey Nation; 50 Phil Norton; 35 Will Ohman; 48 Ruben Quevedo; 41 Steve Rain; 37 Jerry Spradlin; 47 Todd Van Poppel; 36 Kevin Tapani; 59 Ismael Valdes; 51 Brian Williams; 34 Kerry Wood; 45 Tim Worrell; 35 Danny Young	Catchers: 8 Joe Girardi; 58 Mike Mahoney; 16 Jeff Reed; Infielders: 24 Shane Andrews; 17 Mark Grace; 39 Willie Greene; 12 Ricky Gutiérrez; 29 Jeff Huson; 18 Cole Liniak; 20 Chad Meyers; 11 José Nieves; 55,57 Augie Ojeda; 7 Eric Young; 15 Julio Zuleta; Outfielders: 22 Tarrik Brock; 35,37 Brant Brown; 28 Roosevelt Brown; 9 Damon Buford; 6 Ross Gload; 30 Raúl González; 6 Glenallen Hill; 1 Dave Martinez; 51 Gary Matthews Jr.; 27 Corey Patterson; 40 Henry Rodríguez; 21 Sammy Sosa; 22 Rondell White	Manager: 25 Don Baylor; Coaches: 46 Oscar Acosta (pitching); 2 Sandy Alomar Sr. (first base); 3 Gene Glynn (third base); 5 Rene Lachemann (bench); 4 Jeff Pentland (hitting); 26 Billy Williams (special asst)

== Player stats ==
=== Batting ===
==== Starters by position ====
Note: Pos = Position; G = Games played; AB = At bats; H = Hits; Avg. = Batting average; HR = Home runs; RBI = Runs batted in

Pos	Player	G	AB	H	Avg.	HR	RBI
C	Joe Girardi	106	363	101	.278	6	40
1B	Mark Grace	143	510	143	.280	11	82
2B	Eric Young Sr.	153	607	180	.297	6	47
SS	Ricky Gutiérrez	125	449	124	.276	11	56
3B	Willie Greene	105	299	60	.201	10	37
LF	Henry Rodríguez	76	259	65	.251	18	51
CF	Damon Buford	150	495	124	.251	15	48
RF	Sammy Sosa	156	604	193	.320	50	138

==== Other batters ====
Note: G = Games played; AB = At bats; H = Hits; Avg. = Batting average; HR = Home runs; RBI = Runs batted in

Player	G	AB	H	Avg.	HR	RBI
Jeff Reed	90	229	49	.214	4	25
José Nieves	82	198	42	.212	5	24
Shane Andrews	66	192	44	.229	14	39
Glenallen Hill	64	168	44	.262	11	29
Gary Matthews Jr.	80	158	30	.190	4	14
Jeff Huson	70	130	28	.215	0	11
Roosevelt Brown	45	91	32	.352	3	14
Brant Brown	54	89	14	.157	3	10
Augie Ojeda	28	77	17	.221	2	8
Julio Zuleta	30	68	20	.294	3	12
Rondell White	19	67	22	.328	2	7
Dave Martinez	18	54	10	.185	0	1
Chad Meyers	36	52	9	.173	0	5
Corey Patterson	11	42	7	.167	2	2
Ross Gload	18	31	6	.194	1	3
Tarrik Brock	13	12	2	.167	0	0
Mike Mahoney	4	7	2	.286	0	1
Cole Liniak	3	3	0	.000	0	0
Raúl González	3	2	0	.000	0	0

=== Pitching ===
==== Starting pitchers ====
Note: G = Games pitched; IP = Innings pitched; W = Wins; L = Losses; ERA = Earned run average; SO = Strikeouts

Player	G	IP	W	L	ERA	SO
Jon Lieber	35	251.0	12	11	4.41	192
Kevin Tapani	30	195.2	8	12	5.01	150
Kerry Wood	23	137.0	8	7	4.80	132
Scott Downs	18	94.0	4	3	5.17	63
Ismael Valdéz	12	67.0	2	4	5.37	45
Joey Nation	2	11.2	0	2	6.94	8
Phil Norton	2	8.2	0	1	9.35	6

==== Other pitchers ====
Note: G = Games pitched; IP = Innings pitched; W = Wins; L = Losses; ERA = Earned run average; SO = Strikeouts

Player	G	IP	W	L	ERA	SO
Rubén Quevedo	21	88.0	3	10	7.47	65
Daniel Garibay	30	74.2	2	8	6.03	46
Jamie Arnold	12	32.2	0	3	6.61	13
Andrew Lorraine	8	32.0	1	2	6.47	25
Jerry Spradlin	8	15.0	0	1	8.40	13

==== Relief pitchers ====
Note: G = Games pitched; W = Wins; L = Losses; SV = Saves; ERA = Earned run average; SO = Strikeouts

Player	G	W	L	SV	ERA	SO
Rick Aguilera	54	1	2	29	4.91	38
Félix Heredia	74	7	3	2	4.76	52
Tim Worrell	54	3	4	3	2.47	52
Todd Van Poppel	51	4	5	2	3.75	77
Kyle Farnsworth	46	2	9	1	6.43	74
Steve Rain	37	3	4	0	4.35	54
Brian Williams	22	1	1	1	9.62	14
Mark Guthrie	19	2	3	0	4.82	17
Matt Karchner	13	1	1	0	6.14	5
Will Ohman	6	1	0	0	8.10	2
Danny Young	4	0	1	0	21.00	0
Oswaldo Mairena	2	0	0	0	18.00	0

== Farm system ==
Level	Team	League	Manager
AAA	Iowa Cubs	Pacific Coast League	Dave Trembley
AA	West Tenn Diamond Jaxx	Southern League	Dave Bialas
A	Daytona Cubs	Florida State League	Richie Zisk
A	Lansing Lugnuts	Midwest League	Steve McFarland
A-Short Season	Eugene Emeralds	Northwest League	Danny Sheaffer
Rookie	AZL Cubs	Arizona League	Carmelo Martínez

LEAGUE CHAMPIONS: West Tenn, Daytona
