= 2000 Pittsburgh Pirates season =

2000 Pittsburgh Pirates
- League: National League
- Division: Central
- Ballpark: Three Rivers Stadium
- City: Pittsburgh, Pennsylvania
- Record: 69–93 (.426)
- Divisional place: 5th
- Owners: Kevin McClatchy
- General managers: Cam Bonifay
- Managers: Gene Lamont
- Television: WPGH-TV & WCWB-TV; Fox Sports Net Pittsburgh
- Radio: KDKA-AM (Steve Blass, Greg Brown, Lanny Frattare, Bob Walk)

The 2000 Pittsburgh Pirates season was the 119th season of the franchise; the 114th in the National League. This was their 31st and final season at Three Rivers Stadium. The Pirates finished fifth in the National League Central with a record of 69–93.

== Offseason ==
- December 10, 1999: Dale Sveum was signed as a free agent with the Pittsburgh Pirates.
- December 13, 1999: Bruce Aven was traded by the Florida Marlins to the Pittsburgh Pirates for Brant Brown.
- January 19, 2000: Luis Sojo was signed as a free agent with the Pittsburgh Pirates.
- February 9, 2000: Josías Manzanillo was signed as a free agent with the Pittsburgh Pirates.
- February 23, 2000: Al Martin was traded by the Pittsburgh Pirates with cash to the San Diego Padres for John Vander Wal, Geraldo Padua (minors), and James Sak (minors).

== Regular season ==
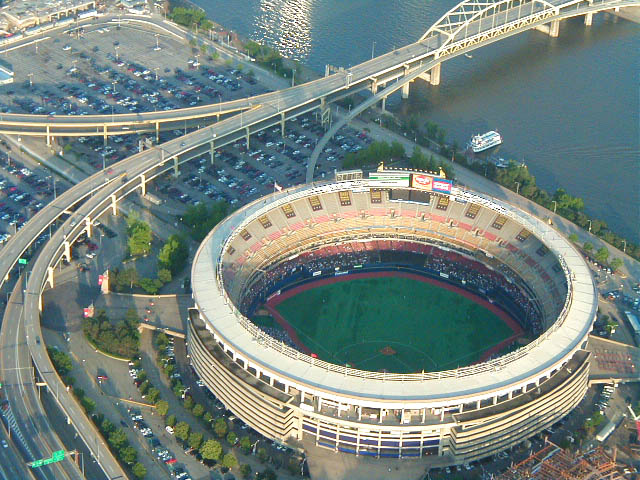
Aerial view of Three Rivers Stadium, Its final year in 2000.

=== Season standings ===
NL Central
Team	W	L	Pct.	GB	Home	Road
St. Louis Cardinals	95	67	.586	—	50‍–‍31	45‍–‍36
Cincinnati Reds	85	77	.525	10	43‍–‍38	42‍–‍39
Milwaukee Brewers	73	89	.451	22	42‍–‍39	31‍–‍50
Houston Astros	72	90	.444	23	39‍–‍42	33‍–‍48
Pittsburgh Pirates	69	93	.426	26	37‍–‍44	32‍–‍49
Chicago Cubs	65	97	.401	30	38‍–‍43	27‍–‍54

=== Game log ===
2000 Game Log (69–93)
April (9–15)

#	Date	Opponent	Score	Win	Loss	Save	Attendance	Record
1	April 4	Astros	2–5	Reynolds	**Schmidt** (0–1)	Wagner	54,399	0–1
2	April 5	Astros	2–11	Lima	**Benson** (0–1)	—	12,208	0–2
3	April 6	Astros	10–1	**Cordova** (1–0)	Holt	—	11,860	1–2
4	April 7	@ Diamondbacks	7–2	**Christiansen** (1–0)	Reynoso	—	32,536	2–2
5	April 8	@ Diamondbacks	5–6	Swindell	**Christiansen** (1–1)	—	33,298	2–3
6	April 9	@ Diamondbacks	0–1	Johnson	**Schmidt** (0–2)	—	34,204	2–4
7	April 11	Expos	3–7	Vazquez	**Benson** (0–2)	Kline	11,335	2–5
8	April 12	Expos	6–4	**Silva** (1–0)	Batista	**Williams** (1)	10,290	3–5
9	April 13	Expos	4–3	**Silva** (2–0)	Urbina	—	11,162	4–5
10	April 14	Mets	5–8 (12)	Franco	**Silva** (2–1)	—	20,725	4–6
11	April 15	Mets	2–0	**Anderson** (1–0)	Rusch	**Williams** (2)	19,592	5–6
12	April 16	Mets	9–12	Mahomes	**Peters** (0–1)	Benitez	20,724	5–7
13	April 18	@ Marlins	5–12	Penny	**Cordova** (1–1)	—	9,494	5–8
14	April 19	@ Marlins	5–1	**Ritchie** (1–0)	Fernandez	—	10,911	6–8
15	April 20	@ Marlins	2–3 (14)	Darensbourg	**Williams** (0–1)	—	9,396	6–9
16	April 21	@ Braves	2–6	Mulholland	**Garcia** (0–1)	—	33,790	6–10
17	April 22	@ Braves	2–4	Chen	**Benson** (0–3)	Rocker	41,389	6–11
18	April 23	@ Braves	3–5	Maddux	**Cordova** (1–2)	Rocker	29,463	6–12
19	April 25	Padres	4–3 (11)	**Sauerbeck** (1–0)	Almanzar	—	12,295	7–12
20	April 26	Padres	9–8	**Williams** (1–1)	Whisenant	—	13,765	8–12
21	April 27	Padres	4–12	Clement	**Parra** (0–1)	—	15,459	8–13
22	April 28	Reds	2–1	**Benson** (1–3)	Harnisch	**Williams** (3)	25,557	9–13
23	April 29	Reds	5–6	Williamson	**Christiansen** (1–2)	Graves	28,731	9–14
24	April 30	Reds	2–6	Bell	**Ritchie** (1–1)	Williamson	29,728	9–15

May (14–13)

#	Date	Opponent	Score	Win	Loss	Save	Attendance	Record
25	May 2	@ Cardinals	10–7	**Wallace** (1–0)	Slocumb	—	38,588	10–15
26	May 3	@ Cardinals	8–2	**Benson** (2–3)	Hentgen	—	32,270	11–15
27	May 4	@ Cardinals	0–5	Stephenson	**Cordova** (1–3)	—	45,994	11–16
28	May 5	@ Cubs	4–2	**Ritchie** (2–1)	Tapani	**Williams** (4)	26,689	12–16
29	May 6	@ Cubs	11–9	**Wallace** (2–0)	Farnsworth	**Williams** (5)	38,957	13–16
30	May 7	@ Cubs	11–3	**Schmidt** (1–2)	Wood	—	38,307	14–16
31	May 9	Mets	0–2	Hampton	**Benson** (2–4)	Benitez	14,015	14–17
32	May 10	Mets	13–9	**Silva** (3–1)	Cook	—	13,711	15–17
33	May 11	Mets	2–3	Leiter	**Anderson** (1–1)	—	16,264	15–18
34	May 12	Brewers	1–6	Haynes	**Schmidt** (1–3)	—	18,524	15–19
35	May 13	Brewers	11–8	**Sauerbeck** (2–0)	Acevedo	**Williams** (6)	26,682	16–19
36	May 14	Brewers	3–0	**Benson** (3–4)	D'Amico	**Christiansen** (1)	19,657	17–19
37	May 16	@ Reds	2–6	Bell	**Ritchie** (2–2)	—	26,271	17–20
38	May 17	@ Reds	9–6	**Silva** (4–1)	Sullivan	—	23,193	18–20
39	May 18	@ Reds	3–4 (10)	Graves	**Garcia** (0–2)	—	26,252	18–21
40	May 19	Cardinals	13–1	**Benson** (4–4)	Ankiel	—	24,281	19–21
41	May 20	Cardinals	4–19	Hentgen	**Cordova** (1–4)	—	36,331	19–22
42	May 21	Cardinals	5–7	Benes	**Ritchie** (2–3)	Veres	33,034	19–23
43	May 23	@ Diamondbacks	1–6	Anderson	**Anderson** (1–2)	—	31,726	19–24
44	May 24	@ Diamondbacks	5–6	Stottlemyre	**Schmidt** (1–4)	Kim	30,462	19–25
45	May 25	@ Diamondbacks	5–7	Daal	**Benson** (4–5)	Mantei	30,759	19–26
46	May 26	@ Rockies	2–1	**Cordova** (2–4)	Yoshii	**Williams** (7)	40,188	20–26
47	May 27	@ Rockies	6–7	White	**Christiansen** (1–3)	—	42,184	20–27
48	May 28	@ Rockies	2–11	Arrojo	**Anderson** (1–3)	—	41,641	20–28
49	May 29	Marlins	10–4	**Schmidt** (2–4)	Nunez	—	17,282	21–28
50	May 30	Marlins	3–2 (10)	**Williams** (2–1)	Alfonseca	—	14,742	22–28
51	May 31	Marlins	5–2	**Cordova** (3–4)	Sanchez	**Williams** (8)	17,731	23–28

June (11–14)

#	Date	Opponent	Score	Win	Loss	Save	Attendance	Record
52	June 2	Royals	9–3	**Ritchie** (3–3)	Batista	—	23,527	24–28
53	June 3	Royals	3–16	Witasick	**Schmidt** (2–5)	—	26,264	24–29
54	June 4	Royals	5–7 (11)	Rakers	**Christiansen** (1–4)	Reichert	27,915	24–30
55	June 5	Tigers	5–1	**Cordova** (4–4)	Mlicki	—	12,479	25–30
56	June 6	Tigers	1–2	Nitkowski	**Anderson** (1–4)	Jones	13,174	25–31
57	June 7	Tigers	4–3	**Ritchie** (4–3)	Nomo	**Williams** (9)	15,067	26–31
58	June 9	@ Royals	5–6 (10)	Spradlin	**Christiansen** (1–5)	—	30,963	26–32
59	June 10	@ Royals	1–2 (12)	Bottalico	**Silva** (4–2)	—	34,868	26–33
60	June 11	@ Royals	10–6 (10)	**Sauerbeck** (3–0)	Spradlin	—	26,495	27–33
61	June 12	Braves	8–10	Ligtenberg	**Christiansen** (1–6)	Remlinger	15,196	27–34
62	June 13	Braves	7–6 (10)	**Silva** (5–2)	Wengert	—	17,971	28–34
63	June 14	Braves	4–8	Maddux	**Anderson** (1–5)	Ligtenberg	16,972	28–35
64	June 15	Braves	2–0	**Benson** (5–5)	Millwood	—	19,065	29–35
65	June 16	Marlins	3–8	Cornelius	**Cordova** (4–5)	Looper	29,737	29–36
66	June 17	Marlins	3–4 (11)	Alfonseca	**Loiselle** (0–1)	Strong	23,552	29–37
67	June 18	Marlins	4–5	Bones	**Christiansen** (1–7)	Alfonseca	24,916	29–38
68	June 19	@ Expos	1–2	Pavano	**Loiselle** (0–2)	Kline	7,483	29–39
69	June 20	@ Expos	2–1	**Benson** (6–5)	Johnson	**Williams** (10)	8,056	30–39
70	June 21	@ Expos	8–3	**Cordova** (5–5)	Armas	**Peters** (1)	8,324	31–39
71	June 22	@ Expos	5–6	Hermanson	**Ritchie** (4–4)	Telford	8,635	31–40
72	June 23	@ Mets	2–12	Jones	**Arroyo** (0–1)	—	39,849	31–41
73	June 24	@ Mets	8–10	Franco	**Loiselle** (0–3)	Benitez	34,894	31–42
74	June 25	@ Mets	0–9	Hampton	**Benson** (6–6)	—	38,984	31–43
75	June 27	Cubs	6–0	**Ritchie** (5–4)	Wood	—	18,688	32–43
76	June 28	Cubs	4–5	Lieber	**Cordova** (5–6)	Aguilera	29,665	32–44
77	June 29	Cubs	5–4 (10)	**Wilkins** (1–0)	Worrell	—	19,531	33–44
78	June 30	@ Phillies	8–3	**Benson** (7–6)	Wolf	—	38,221	34–44

July (11–14)

#	Date	Opponent	Score	Win	Loss	Save	Attendance	Record
79	July 1	@ Phillies	3–4	Byrd	**Arroyo** (0–2)	Brantley	48,406	34–45
80	July 2	@ Phillies	1–9	Schilling	**Ritchie** (5–5)	—	20,290	34–46
81	July 3	@ Cubs	0–3	Lieber	**Cordova** (5–7)	—	40,524	34–47
82	July 4	@ Cubs	10–4	**Wilkins** (2–0)	Aguilera	—	37,043	35–47
83	July 5	@ Cubs	9–6	**Anderson** (2–5)	Downs	—	35,391	36–47
84	July 7	Twins	8–6	**Christiansen** (2–7)	Wells	**Williams** (11)	22,134	37–47
85	July 8	Twins	4–1	**Benson** (8–6)	Milton	**Williams** (12)	33,814	38–47
86	July 9	Twins	2–3	Redman	**Silva** (5–3)	Hawkins	23,154	38–48
**71st All-Star Game in Atlanta, Georgia**
87	July 13	@ Indians	3–4 (10)	Karsay	**Sauerbeck** (3–1)	—	43,225	38–49
88	July 14	@ Indians	3–9	Finley	**Benson** (8–7)	—	43,046	38–50
89	July 15	@ Indians	4–6	Brewington	**Silva** (5–4)	Karsay	43,049	38–51
90	July 16	@ Dodgers	3–7	Adams	**Williams** (2–2)	—	34,116	38–52
91	July 17	@ Dodgers	6–9	Dreifort	**Arroyo** (0–3)	Shaw	25,261	38–53
92	July 18	@ Dodgers	8–6	**Manzanillo** (1–0)	Judd	**Williams** (13)	34,872	39–53
93	July 19	@ Brewers	0–6	D'Amico	**Benson** (8–8)	—	20,840	39–54
94	July 20	@ Brewers	9–2	**Silva** (6–4)	Haynes	—	29,389	40–54
95	July 21	Phillies	9–2	**Anderson** (3–5)	Byrd	—	22,438	41–54
96	July 22	Phillies	2–1	**Arroyo** (1–3)	Person	**Williams** (14)	28,485	42–54
97	July 23	Phillies	1–4	Schilling	**Ritchie** (5–6)	—	23,840	42–55
98	July 25	Brewers	1–4 (11)	Leskanic	**Christiansen** (2–8)	Wickman	15,808	42–56
99	July 26	Brewers	5–4	**Silva** (7–4)	Haynes	**Williams** (15)	20,421	43–56
100	July 27	Brewers	3–4	Leskanic	**Manzanillo** (1–1)	Wickman	16,636	43–57
101	July 28	Padres	16–5	**Arroyo** (2–3)	Clement	—	20,686	44–57
102	July 29	Padres	10–2	**Cordova** (6–7)	Tollberg	—	30,118	45–57
103	July 30	Padres	8–9	Wall	**Wilkins** (2–1)	Hoffman	19,680	45–58

August (8–21)

#	Date	Opponent	Score	Win	Loss	Save	Attendance	Record
104	August 1	Dodgers	6–0	**Anderson** (4–5)	Perez	—	—	46–58
105	August 1	Dodgers	3–5	Herges	**Wilkins** (2–2)	Shaw	21,028	46–59
106	August 2	Dodgers	5–11	Dreifort	**Silva** (7–5)	—	19,537	46–60
107	August 3	@ Giants	2–10	Ortiz	**Cordova** (6–8)	—	40,930	46–61
108	August 4	@ Giants	3–5	Henry	**Benson** (8–9)	Nen	40,930	46–62
109	August 5	@ Giants	7–2	**Serafini** (1–0)	Gardner	—	40,930	47–62
110	August 6	@ Giants	1–7	Estes	**Arroyo** (2–4)	—	40,930	47–63
111	August 7	@ Rockies	8–7	**Sauerbeck** (4–1)	Jimenez	**Williams** (16)	39,691	48–63
112	August 8	@ Rockies	1–6	Rose	**Silva** (7–6)	—	38,535	48–64
113	August 9	@ Rockies	3–4	White	**Williams** (2–3)	—	39,328	48–65
114	August 11	Diamondbacks	1–6	Reynoso	**Serafini** (1–1)	—	25,281	48–66
115	August 12	Diamondbacks	9–6	**Sauerbeck** (5–1)	Schilling	—	34,101	49–66
116	August 13	Diamondbacks	6–7	Morgan	**Arroyo** (2–5)	Mantei	25,321	49–67
117	August 14	@ Astros	2–16	Holt	**Silva** (7–7)	—	30,220	49–68
118	August 15	@ Astros	4–5	Lima	**Benson** (8–10)	Dotel	30,020	49–69
119	August 16	@ Astros	10–11	Elarton	**Serafini** (1–2)	Dotel	30,165	49–70
120	August 18	@ Reds	6–3	**Ritchie** (6–6)	Sullivan	**Williams** (17)	31,891	50–70
121	August 19	@ Reds	1–7	Parris	**Anderson** (4–6)	—	34,370	50–71
122	August 20	@ Reds	7–3	**Silva** (8–7)	Dessens	—	32,545	51–71
123	August 21	@ Cardinals	4–7	Stephenson	**Benson** (8–11)	Veres	35,644	51–72
124	August 22	@ Cardinals	6–2	**Manzanillo** (2–1)	Kile	—	31,534	52–72
125	August 23	@ Cardinals	2–5	Ankiel	**Ritchie** (6–7)	Veres	31,288	52–73
126	August 25	Rockies	3–6	Tavarez	**Anderson** (4–7)	—	23,104	52–74
127	August 26	Rockies	4–11	Astacio	**Silva** (8–8)	—	23,340	52–75
128	August 27	Rockies	2–9	Bohanon	**Serafini** (1–3)	—	20,157	52–76
129	August 28	Giants	4–5	Embree	**Sauerbeck** (5–2)	Nen	15,125	52–77
130	August 29	Giants	8–0	**Benson** (9–11)	Hernandez	—	14,306	53–77
131	August 30	Giants	0–2	Ortiz	**Anderson** (4–8)	Nen	16,576	53–78
132	August 31	Giants	2–10	Rueter	**Silva** (8–9)	—	13,781	53–79

September (16–13)

#	Date	Opponent	Score	Win	Loss	Save	Attendance	Record
133	September 1	@ Padres	3–2 (10)	**Williams** (3–3)	Hoffman	—	16,813	54–79
134	September 2	@ Padres	6–3	**Ritchie** (7–7)	Clement	**Sauerbeck** (1)	33,358	55–79
135	September 3	@ Padres	8–6 (13)	**Skrmetta** (1–0)	Almanzar	**Williams** (18)	20,389	56–79
136	September 4	@ Dodgers	12–1	**Anderson** (5–8)	Dreifort	—	31,418	57–79
137	September 5	@ Dodgers	8–0	**Silva** (9–9)	Perez	—	22,780	58–79
138	September 6	@ Dodgers	8–3	**Serafini** (2–3)	Valdez	—	28,462	59–79
139	September 8	Reds	7–3	**Ritchie** (8–7)	Williamson	—	—	60–79
140	September 8	Reds	3–1	**Wilkins** (3–2)	Villone	**Williams** (19)	26,486	61–79
141	September 9	Reds	4–6	Parris	**Benson** (9–12)	Graves	34,590	61–80
142	September 10	Reds	4–6	Dessens	**Anderson** (5–9)	Graves	35,046	61–81
143	September 11	Cardinals	4–8	Stephenson	**Manzanillo** (2–2)	—	16,583	61–82
144	September 12	Cardinals	1–11	Kile	**Serafini** (2–4)	—	15,824	61–83
145	September 13	Cardinals	5–9	Ankiel	**Ritchie** (8–8)	—	22,236	61–84
146	September 14	@ Astros	7–8	Slusarski	**Skrmetta** (1–1)	—	36,740	61–85
147	September 15	@ Astros	7–16	Powell	**Skrmetta** (1–2)	Slusarski	32,661	61–86
148	September 16	@ Astros	9–10 (10)	Valdes	**Sauerbeck** (5–3)	—	41,248	61–87
149	September 17	@ Astros	3–5	Elarton	**Serafini** (2–5)	Dotel	40,036	61–88
150	September 18	@ Phillies	6–5	**Loiselle** (1–3)	Padilla	**Williams** (20)	11,470	62–88
151	September 19	@ Phillies	12–8	**Skrmetta** (2–2)	Telemaco	**Williams** (21)	11,362	63–88
152	September 20	@ Phillies	7–6 (10)	**Loiselle** (2–3)	Brock	**Williams** (22)	12,762	64–88
153	September 21	@ Brewers	2–12	Rigdon	**Anderson** (5–10)	—	14,688	64–89
154	September 23	@ Brewers	4–2	**Silva** (10–9)	D'Amico	**Williams** (23)	—	65–89
155	September 23	@ Brewers	4–5 (10)	Leskanic	**Arroyo** (2–6)	—	26,040	65–90
156	September 24	@ Brewers	5–8	Leskanic	**Williams** (3–4)	—	26,186	65–91
157	September 26	Astros	9–4	**Benson** (10–12)	Holt	—	14,311	66–91
158	September 27	Astros	1–10	McKnight	**Anderson** (5–11)	—	14,511	66–92
159	September 28	Astros	3–2	**Silva** (11–9)	Dotel	—	17,710	67–92
160	September 29	Cubs	8–4	**Wilkins** (4–2)	Rain	—	40,128	68–92
161	September 30	Cubs	4–2	**Ritchie** (9–8)	Quevedo	**Williams** (24)	43,458	69–92

October (0–1)

#	Date	Opponent	Score	Win	Loss	Save	Attendance	Record
162	October 1	Cubs	9–10	Farnsworth	**Sauerbeck** (5–4)	Arnold	55,351	69–93

Legend: = Win = Loss
Bold = Pirates team member

=== Record vs. opponents ===
2000 National League record Source: NL Standings Head-to-Head
Team	AZ	ATL	CHC	CIN	COL	FLA	HOU	LAD	MIL	MON	NYM	PHI	PIT	SD	SF	STL	AL
Arizona	—	3–6	5–4	2–5	7–6	4–5	6–1	7–6	4–5	4–5	2–7	8–1	7–2	9–4	6–7	5–4	6–9
Atlanta	6–3	—	4–5	2–5	5–4	6–6	5–4	7–2	6–3	6–7	7–6	8–5	5–2	8–1	6–3	3–4	11–7
Chicago	4–5	5–4	—	4–8	4–5	1–6	5–7	3–6	6–7	4–5	2–5	6–3	3–9	3–5	4–5	3–10	8–7
Cincinnati	5–2	5–2	8–4	—	6–3	3–6	7–5	4–5	5–8–1	6–3	5–4	3–4	7–6	4–5	3–6	7–6	7–8
Colorado	6–7	4–5	5–4	3–6	—	4–5	5–4	4–9	4–5	7–2	3–6	6–3	7–2	7–6	6–7	5–3	6–6
Florida	5–4	6–6	6–1	6–3	5–4	—	3–5	2–7	3–4	7–6	6–6	9–4	5–4	2–7	3–6	3–6	8–9
Houston	1–6	4–5	7–5	5–7	4–5	5–3	—	3–6	7–6	4–5	2–5	5–4	10–3	2–7	1–8	6–6	6–9
Los Angeles	6–7	2–7	6–3	5–4	9–4	7–2	6–3	—	3–4	5–3	4–5	5–4	4–5	8–5	7–5	3–6	6–9
Milwaukee	5–4	3–6	7–6	8–5–1	5–4	4–3	6–7	4–3	—	4–5	2–7	2–5	7–5	2–7	3–6	5–7	6–9
Montreal	5–4	7–6	5–4	3–6	2–7	6–7	5–4	3–5	5–4	—	3–9	5–7	3–4	3–6	3–6	2–5	7–11
New York	7–2	6–7	5–2	4–5	6–3	6–6	5–2	5–4	7–2	9–3	—	6–7	7–2	3–6	3–5	6–3	9–9
Philadelphia	1–8	5–8	3–6	4–3	3–6	4–9	4–5	4–5	5–2	7–5	7–6	—	3–6	2–5	2–7	2–7	9–9
Pittsburgh	2–7	2–5	9–3	6–7	2–7	4–5	3–10	5–4	5–7	4–3	2–7	6–3	—	7–2	2–6	4–8	6–9
San Diego	4–9	1–8	5–3	5–4	6–7	7–2	7–2	5–8	7–2	6–3	6–3	5–2	2–7	—	5–7	0–9	5–10
San Francisco	7–6	3–6	5–4	6–3	7–6	6–3	8–1	5–7	6–3	6–3	5–3	7–2	6–2	7–5	—	5–4	8–7
St. Louis	4–5	4–3	10–3	6–7	3–5	6–3	6–6	6–3	7–5	5–2	3–6	7–2	8–4	9–0	4–5	—	7–8

=== Detailed records ===
**National League**
Opponent	W	L	WP	RS	RA
**NL East**
Atlanta Braves	2	5	0.286	28	39
Florida Marlins	4	5	0.444	40	41
Montreal Expos	4	3	0.571	29	26
New York Mets	2	7	0.222	41	65
Philadelphia Phillies	6	3	0.667	49	42
Total	18	23	0.439	187	213
**NL Central**
Chicago Cubs	9	3	0.750	81	52
Cincinnati Reds	6	7	0.462	55	58
Houston Astros	3	10	0.231	69	104
Milwaukee Brewers	5	7	0.417	48	61
St. Louis Cardinals	4	8	0.333	62	83
Total	27	35	0.435	315	358
**NL West**
Arizona Diamondbacks	2	7	0.222	39	47
Colorado Rockies	2	7	0.222	31	62
Los Angeles Dodgers	5	4	0.556	59	42
San Diego Padres	7	2	0.778	68	50
San Francisco Giants	2	6	0.250	27	41
Total	18	26	0.409	224	242
**American League**
Cleveland Indians	0	3	0.000	10	19
Detroit Tigers	2	1	0.667	10	6
Kansas City Royals	2	4	0.333	33	40
Minnesota Twins	2	1	0.667	14	10
Total	6	9	0.400	67	75
Season Total	69	93	0.426	793	888

Month	Games	Won	Lost	Win %	RS	RA
April	24	9	15	0.375	100	127
May	27	14	13	0.519	149	145
June	27	11	16	0.407	123	142
July	25	11	14	0.440	128	120
August	29	8	21	0.276	120	178
September	29	16	13	0.552	164	166
October	1	0	1	0.000	9	10
Total	162	69	93	0.426	793	888

	Games	Won	Lost	Win %	RS	RA
Home	81	37	44	0.457	396	431
Away	81	32	49	0.395	397	457
Total	162	69	93	0.426	793	888

== Roster ==
2000 Pittsburgh Pirates
Roster
Pitchers: 55 Jimmy Anderson; 69 Bronson Arroyo; 34 Kris Benson; 41 Jason Christiansen; 52 Brad Clontz; 67 Francisco Córdova; 64 Mike Garcia; 51 Rich Loiselle; 49 Josías Manzanillo; 58 Brian O'Connor; 60 José Parra; 31 Chris Peters; 48 Todd Ritchie; 47 Scott Sauerbeck; 22 Jason Schmidt; 45 Dan Serafini; 56 José Silva; 64 Matt Skrmetta; 26 Brian Smith; 57 Steve Sparks; 39 Jeff Wallace; 35 Marc Wilkins; 43 Mike Williams	Catchers: 18 Jason Kendall; 15 Keith Osik; Infielders: 6 Mike Benjamin; 25 Iván Cruz; 52 Alex Hernández; 2 Pat Meares; 30 Warren Morris; 10 Abraham Núñez; 16 Aramis Ramírez; 19 Luis Sojo; 12 John Wehner; 25 Enrique Wilson; 29 Kevin Young	Outfielders: 37 Bruce Aven; 13 Adrian Brown; 19 Emil Brown; 12 Wil Cordero; 24 Brian Giles; 3 Chad Hermansen; 27 Adam Hyzdu; 61 Alex Ramírez; 14 Tike Redman; 28 John Vander Wal	Manager: 32 Gene Lamont; Coaches: 57 Jeff Banister (bench); 27 Joe Jones (first base); 45 Jack Lind (third base); 23 Lloyd McClendon (hitting); 44 Rick Renick (bench); 50 Pete Vuckovich (pitching); 54 Spin Williams (bullpen)

=== Opening Day lineup ===
Opening Day Starters
#	Name	Position
18	Jason Kendall	C
2	Pat Meares	SS
24	Brian Giles	RF
29	Kevin Young	1B
12	Wil Cordero	LF
16	Aramis Ramírez	3B
3	Chad Hermansen	CF
6	Mike Benjamin	2B
22	Jason Schmidt	SP

== Player stats ==
Batting

Note: G = Games played; AB = At bats; H = Hits; Avg. = Batting average; HR = Home runs; RBI = Runs batted in

Regular season
Player	G	AB	H	Avg.	HR	RBI
B. O'Connor	6	2	1	0.500	0	0
A. Hyzdu	12	18	7	0.389	1	4
M. Garcia	13	3	1	0.333	0	0
T. Redman	9	18	6	0.333	1	1
J. Kendall	152	579	185	0.320	14	58
A. Brown	104	308	97	0.315	4	28
B. Giles	156	559	176	0.315	35	123
J. Wehner	21	50	15	0.300	1	9
J. Vander Wal	134	384	115	0.299	24	94
K. Osik	46	123	36	0.293	4	22
L. Sojo	61	176	50	0.284	5	20
W. Cordero	89	348	98	0.282	16	51
M. Benjamin	93	233	63	0.270	2	19
E. Wilson	40	122	32	0.262	3	15
W. Morris	144	528	137	0.259	3	43
K. Young	132	496	128	0.258	20	88
Ar. Ramírez	73	254	65	0.256	6	35
B. Aven	72	148	37	0.250	5	25
P. Meares	132	462	111	0.240	13	47
A. Núñez	40	91	20	0.220	1	8
E. Brown	50	119	26	0.218	3	16
T. Ritchie	30	60	13	0.217	0	2
Al. Ramírez	43	115	24	0.209	4	18
A. Hernández	20	60	12	0.200	1	5
C. Hermansen	33	108	20	0.185	2	8
J. Silva	48	34	6	0.176	0	2
C. Peters	17	6	1	0.167	0	1
M. Wilkins	50	6	1	0.167	0	0
B. Arroyo	21	21	3	0.143	0	0
J. Anderson	27	50	7	0.140	0	1
F. Córdova	17	35	4	0.114	0	3
K. Benson	30	65	6	0.092	0	1
I. Cruz	8	11	1	0.091	0	0
D. Serafini	11	24	2	0.083	0	2
J. Manzanillo	42	3	0	0.000	0	0
S. Sauerbeck	72	1	0	0.000	0	0
J. Schmidt	10	19	0	0.000	0	0
M. Skrmetta	8	2	0	0.000	0	0
J. Wallace	37	1	0	0.000	0	0
M. Williams	69	1	0	0.000	0	0
J. Christiansen	41	0	0	—	0	0
B. Clontz	5	0	0	—	0	0
R. Loiselle	38	0	0	—	0	0
J. Parra	6	0	0	—	0	0
B. Smith	3	0	0	—	0	0
S. Sparks	3	0	0	—	0	0
Team totals	162	5,643	1,506	0.267	168	749

Pitching

Note: G = Games pitched; IP = Innings pitched; W = Wins; L = Losses; ERA = Earned run average; SO = Strikeouts

Regular season
Player	G	IP	W	L	ERA	SO
C. Peters	18	28 1/3	0	1	2.86	16
J. Manzanillo	43	58 2/3	2	2	3.38	39
M. Williams	72	72	3	4	3.50	71
K. Benson	32	217 2/3	10	12	3.85	184
S. Sauerbeck	75	75 2/3	5	4	4.04	83
T. Ritchie	31	187	9	8	4.81	124
D. Serafini	11	62 1/3	2	5	4.91	32
J. Christiansen	44	38	2	8	4.97	41
M. Wilkins	52	60 1/3	4	2	5.07	37
R. Loiselle	40	42 1/3	2	3	5.10	32
B. O'Connor	6	12 1/3	0	0	5.11	7
B. Clontz	5	7	0	0	5.14	8
F. Córdova	18	95	6	8	5.21	66
J. Anderson	27	144	5	11	5.25	73
J. Schmidt	11	63 1/3	2	5	5.40	51
J. Silva	51	136	11	9	5.56	98
B. Arroyo	20	71 2/3	2	6	6.40	50
S. Sparks	3	4	0	0	6.75	2
J. Parra	6	11 2/3	0	1	6.94	9
J. Wallace	38	35 2/3	2	0	7.07	27
M. Skrmetta	8	9 1/3	2	2	9.64	7
B. Smith	3	4 1/3	0	0	10.38	3
M. Garcia	13	11 1/3	0	2	11.12	9
K. Osik	1	1	0	0	45.00	1
Team totals	162	1449	69	93	4.94	1,070

== Awards and honors ==
2000 Major League Baseball All-Star Game

- Jason Kendall, C, reserve
- Brian Giles, OF, reserve

== Transactions ==
- August 6, 2000: Bruce Aven was sent to the Los Angeles Dodgers by the Pittsburgh Pirates as part of a conditional deal.
- August 7, 2000: Luis Sojo was traded by the Pittsburgh Pirates to the New York Yankees for Chris Spurling.

== Farm system ==
Level	Team	League	Manager
AAA	Nashville Sounds	Pacific Coast League	Trent Jewett and Richie Hebner
AA	Altoona Curve	Eastern League	Marty Brown
A	Lynchburg Hillcats	Carolina League	Tracy Woodson
A	Hickory Crawdads	South Atlantic League	Jay Loviglio
A-Short Season	Williamsport Crosscutters	New York–Penn League	Curtis Wilkerson
Rookie	GCL Pirates	Gulf Coast League	Woody Huyke
