= 2000 Florida Marlins season =

2000 Florida Marlins
- League: National League
- Division: East
- Ballpark: Pro Player Stadium
- City: Miami Gardens, Florida
- Record: 79–82 (.491)
- Divisional place: 3rd
- Owners: John W. Henry
- General managers: Dave Dombrowski
- Managers: John Boles
- Television: FSN Florida; WAMI-TV (Joe Angel, Dave O'Brien, Tommy Hutton)
- Radio: WQAM (Joe Angel, Dave O'Brien, Jon Sciambi); WQBA (Spanish) (Felo Ramírez)

The 2000 Florida Marlins season was the eighth season for the Major League Baseball (MLB) franchise in the National League. It would begin with the team attempting to improve on their season from 1999. Their manager was John Boles. They played home games at Pro Player Stadium. They finished with a record of 79–82, third in the National League East.

== Offseason ==
- December 13, 1999: Johan Santana was traded by the Florida Marlins with cash to the Minnesota Twins for Jared Camp (minors).
- December 13, 1999: Bruce Aven was traded by the Florida Marlins to the Pittsburgh Pirates for Brant Brown.

== Regular season ==
- On September 10, 2000, Randy Johnson recorded his 3000th strikeout as he struck out Florida Marlins' third baseman Mike Lowell.

=== Season standings ===
NL East
Team	W	L	Pct.	GB	Home	Road
Atlanta Braves	95	67	.586	—	51‍–‍30	44‍–‍37
New York Mets	94	68	.580	1	55‍–‍26	39‍–‍42
Florida Marlins	79	82	.491	15½	43‍–‍38	36‍–‍44
Montreal Expos	67	95	.414	28	37‍–‍44	30‍–‍51
Philadelphia Phillies	65	97	.401	30	34‍–‍47	31‍–‍50

=== Record vs. opponents ===
2000 National League record Source: NL Standings Head-to-Head
Team	AZ	ATL	CHC	CIN	COL	FLA	HOU	LAD	MIL	MON	NYM	PHI	PIT	SD	SF	STL	AL
Arizona	—	3–6	5–4	2–5	7–6	4–5	6–1	7–6	4–5	4–5	2–7	8–1	7–2	9–4	6–7	5–4	6–9
Atlanta	6–3	—	4–5	2–5	5–4	6–6	5–4	7–2	6–3	6–7	7–6	8–5	5–2	8–1	6–3	3–4	11–7
Chicago	4–5	5–4	—	4–8	4–5	1–6	5–7	3–6	6–7	4–5	2–5	6–3	3–9	3–5	4–5	3–10	8–7
Cincinnati	5–2	5–2	8–4	—	6–3	3–6	7–5	4–5	5–8–1	6–3	5–4	3–4	7–6	4–5	3–6	7–6	7–8
Colorado	6–7	4–5	5–4	3–6	—	4–5	5–4	4–9	4–5	7–2	3–6	6–3	7–2	7–6	6–7	5–3	6–6
Florida	5–4	6–6	6–1	6–3	5–4	—	3–5	2–7	3–4	7–6	6–6	9–4	5–4	2–7	3–6	3–6	8–9
Houston	1–6	4–5	7–5	5–7	4–5	5–3	—	3–6	7–6	4–5	2–5	5–4	10–3	2–7	1–8	6–6	6–9
Los Angeles	6–7	2–7	6–3	5–4	9–4	7–2	6–3	—	3–4	5–3	4–5	5–4	4–5	8–5	7–5	3–6	6–9
Milwaukee	5–4	3–6	7–6	8–5–1	5–4	4–3	6–7	4–3	—	4–5	2–7	2–5	7–5	2–7	3–6	5–7	6–9
Montreal	5–4	7–6	5–4	3–6	2–7	6–7	5–4	3–5	5–4	—	3–9	5–7	3–4	3–6	3–6	2–5	7–11
New York	7–2	6–7	5–2	4–5	6–3	6–6	5–2	5–4	7–2	9–3	—	6–7	7–2	3–6	3–5	6–3	9–9
Philadelphia	1–8	5–8	3–6	4–3	3–6	4–9	4–5	4–5	5–2	7–5	7–6	—	3–6	2–5	2–7	2–7	9–9
Pittsburgh	2–7	2–5	9–3	6–7	2–7	4–5	3–10	5–4	5–7	4–3	2–7	6–3	—	7–2	2–6	4–8	6–9
San Diego	4–9	1–8	5–3	5–4	6–7	7–2	7–2	5–8	7–2	6–3	6–3	5–2	2–7	—	5–7	0–9	5–10
San Francisco	7–6	3–6	5–4	6–3	7–6	6–3	8–1	5–7	6–3	6–3	5–3	7–2	6–2	7–5	—	5–4	8–7
St. Louis	4–5	4–3	10–3	6–7	3–5	6–3	6–6	6–3	7–5	5–2	3–6	7–2	8–4	9–0	4–5	—	7–8

=== Transactions ===
- April 5, 2000: Randall Simon was signed as a free agent with the Florida Marlins.
- May 8, 2000: Randall Simon was released by the Florida Marlins.
- July 31, 2000: Henry Rodriguez was traded by the Chicago Cubs to the Florida Marlins for Ross Gload and Dave Noyce (minors).

=== Citrus Series ===
2000 Citrus Series split 3-3

- June 9- @ Devil Rays 6- Marlins 4
- June 10- Marlins 5- @ Devil Rays 1
- June 11- @ Devil Rays 7- Marlins 6
- July 7- Devil Rays 8- @ Marlins 3
- July 8- @ Marlins 6- Devil Rays 5
- July 9- @ Marlins 10- Devil Rays 9

=== Roster ===
2000 Florida Marlins
Roster
Pitchers: 57 Antonio Alfonseca; 55 Armando Almanza; 26 Manny Aybar; 29 Ricky Bones; 43 A. J. Burnett; 38 Reid Cornelius; 22 Vic Darensbourg; 46 Ryan Dempster; 32 Alex Fernandez; 37 Jason Grilli; 41 Braden Looper; 47 Ron Mahay; 34 Dan Miceli; 36 Vladimir Núñez; 28 Brad Penny; 21 Jesús Sánchez; 23 Chuck Smith; 50 Joe Strong	Catchers: 6 Paul Bako; 17 Ramón Castro; 14 Sandy Martínez; 52 Mike Redmond; Infielders: 10 Dave Berg; 1 Luis Castillo; 2 Chris Clapinski; 6 Andy Fox; 11 Álex González; 25 Derrek Lee; 19 Mike Lowell; 15 Kevin Millar; 3 Pablo Ozuna; 26 Nate Rolison	Outfielders: 23 Danny Bautista; 37 Brant Brown; 30 Cliff Floyd; 7 Mark Kotsay; 26 Henry Rodríguez; 18 Mark Smith; 44 Preston Wilson; Other batters: 9 Mendy López	Manager: 13 John Boles; Coaches: 12 Joe Breeden (bench); 31 Rich Dubee (pitching); 33 Fredi González (third base); 22 Rusty Kuntz (first base); 16 Jack Maloof (hitting); 8 Tony Taylor (bullpen)

== Player stats ==
=== Batting ===
==== Starters by position ====
Note: Pos = Position; G = Games played; AB = At bats; H = Hits; Avg. = Batting average; HR = Home runs; RBI = Runs batted in

Pos	Player	G	AB	H	Avg.	HR	RBI
C	Mike Redmond	87	210	53	.252	0	15
1B	Derrek Lee	158	477	134	.281	28	70
2B	Luis Castillo	136	539	180	.334	2	17
SS	Álex González	109	385	77	.200	7	42
3B	Mike Lowell	140	508	137	.270	22	91
LF	Cliff Floyd	121	420	126	.300	22	91
CF	Preston Wilson	161	605	160	.264	31	121
RF	Mark Kotsay	152	530	158	.298	12	57

==== Other batters ====
Note: G = Games played; AB = At bats; H = Hits; Avg. = Batting average; HR = Home runs; RBI = Runs batted in

Player	G	AB	H	Avg.	HR	RBI
Kevin Millar	123	259	67	.259	14	42
Dave Berg	82	210	53	.252	1	21
Mark Smith	104	192	47	.245	5	27
Andy Fox	69	164	40	.244	3	10
Paul Bako	56	161	39	.242	0	14
Ramón Castro	50	138	33	.239	2	14
Henry Rodríguez	36	108	29	.269	2	10
Danny Bautista	44	89	17	.191	4	12
Brant Brown	41	73	14	.192	2	6
Chris Clapinski	34	49	15	.306	1	7
Pablo Ozuna	14	24	8	.333	0	0
Sandy Martínez	10	18	4	.222	0	0
Nate Rolison	8	13	1	.077	0	2
Mendy López	4	3	0	.000	0	0

=== Pitching ===
==== Starting pitchers ====
Note: G = Games pitched; IP = Innings pitched; W = Wins; L = Losses; ERA = Earned run average; SO = Strikeouts

Player	G	IP	W	L	ERA	SO
Ryan Dempster	33	226.1	14	10	3.66	209
Jesús Sánchez	32	182.0	9	12	5.34	123
Reid Cornelius	22	125.0	4	10	4.82	50
Chuck Smith	19	122.2	6	6	3.23	118
Brad Penny	23	119.2	8	7	4.81	80
A.J. Burnett	13	82.2	3	7	4.79	57
Alex Fernandez	8	52.1	4	4	4.13	27
Jason Grilli	1	6.2	1	0	5.40	3

==== Other pitchers ====
Note: G = Games pitched; IP = Innings pitched; W = Wins; L = Losses; ERA = Earned run average; SO = Strikeouts

Player	G	IP	W	L	ERA	SO
Vladimir Núñez	17	68.1	0	6	7.90	45

==== Relief pitchers ====
Note: G = Games pitched; W = Wins; L = Losses; SV = Saves; ERA = Earned run average; SO = Strikeouts

Player	G	W	L	SV	ERA	SO
Antonio Alfonseca	68	5	6	45	4.24	47
Braden Looper	73	5	1	2	4.41	29
Armando Almanza	67	4	2	0	4.86	46
Ricky Bones	56	2	3	0	4.54	59
Vic Darensbourg	56	5	3	0	4.06	59
Dan Miceli	45	6	4	0	4.25	40
Manny Aybar	21	1	0	0	2.63	14
Ron Mahay	18	1	0	0	6.04	27
Joe Strong	18	1	1	1	7.32	18

== Farm system ==
Level	Team	League	Manager
AAA	Calgary Cannons	Pacific Coast League	Lynn Jones
AA	Portland Sea Dogs	Eastern League	Rick Renteria
A	Brevard County Manatees	Florida State League	Dave Huppert
A	Kane County Cougars	Midwest League	Russ Morman
A-Short Season	Utica Blue Sox	New York–Penn League	Jon Deeble
Rookie	GCL Marlins	Gulf Coast League	Kevin Boles
