= Phil Norton (disambiguation) =

Philip or Phil Norton may refer to:

- Philip Norton, Baron Norton of Louth (born 1951), author and politician
- Phil Norton, baseball pitcher
- Phil Norton, character in American Ninja
