= Chris Clapinski =

American baseball player (born 1971)

- Infielder
- Born: August 20, 1971 (age 54); Buffalo, New York, U.S.
- Batted: Both Threw: Right

MLB debut
- July 17, 1999, for the Florida Marlins

Last MLB appearance
- September 24, 2000, for the Florida Marlins

MLB statistics
- Batting average: .267
- Hits: 28
- Runs: 18
- Stats at Baseball Reference

Teams
- Florida Marlins (1999–2000)

Christopher Alan Clapinski (born August 20, 1971) is an American former Major League Baseball (MLB) infielder who played for the Florida Marlins in 1999 and 2000.

== Biography ==
A native of Buffalo, New York, Clapinski attended Palm Desert High School and the University of California, Berkeley. In 1990 and 1991, he played collegiate summer baseball with the Wareham Gatemen of the Cape Cod Baseball League.

In 1992, Clapinski signed with the Florida Marlins as an amateur free agent. He made his major league debut for the Marlins in 1999, playing in 36 games for the club that season, and in 34 games for Florida the following season. While playing with the minor league Buffalo Bisons in 2004, Clapinski appeared at every position except for pitcher and catcher.
