= Doug Nickle =

American baseball player (born 1974)

- Pitcher
- Born: October 2, 1974 (age 51); Sonoma, California, U.S.
- Batted: Right Threw: Right

MLB debut
- September 18, 2000, for the Philadelphia Phillies

Last MLB appearance
- September 28, 2002, for the San Diego Padres

MLB statistics
- Win–loss record: 1–0
- Earned run average: 7.84
- Strikeouts: 10
- Stats at Baseball Reference

Teams
- Philadelphia Phillies (2000–2002); San Diego Padres (2002)

Douglas Alan Nickle (born October 2, 1974) is an American former Major League Baseball relief pitcher. He was born in Sonoma, California. He played for the Philadelphia Phillies (2000–2002) and the San Diego Padres (2002) of the National League during his Major League Baseball career. Nickle attended the University of California where he played college baseball. He batted and threw right-handed during his career.

== Career ==
Doug Nickle was drafted by the Los Angeles Angels of Anaheim in the 13th round of the 1997 amateur draft on June 3, 1997. He signed with the Angels on June 9, 1997, but quickly left that organization as a player on September 9, 1998 when he was traded to the Philadelphia Phillies for Gregg Jefferies to complete an earlier deal made on August 28.

On September 18, 2000, Nickle made his major league debut with the Philadelphia Phillies. On that day, the Pittsburgh Pirates were playing against the Philadelphia Phillies at Veterans Stadium with 11,470 people attending the game. Nickle replaced Tom Jacquez pitching and batting seventh at the top of the ninth inning. Alex Ramírez was the first batter he faced, and he hit a single. At the end of the game, the Pittsburgh Pirates won the game 6–5.

On July 29, 2002, Nickle was traded by the Philadelphia Phillies with Scott Rolen and cash to the St. Louis Cardinals for Plácido Polanco, Mike Timlin, and Bud Smith. On August 28, 2002, he was selected off waivers by the San Diego Padres from the St. Louis Cardinals, and soon after on October 1, 2002, he was selected off waivers again this time by the New York Mets. Nickle played his last major league baseball game on September 28, 2002, but continued to play in minor league baseball . On December 20, 2002, Nickle was granted free agency. On January 17, 2003, he was signed as a free agent with the Anaheim Angels. On July 30, 2003, he was traded by the Anaheim Angels with Scott Schoeneweis to the Chicago White Sox for Gary Glover, Scott Dunn, and Tim Bittner (minor league baseball). On September 4, 2003, he was released by the Chicago White Sox. On December 11, 2003, he was signed as a free agent with the Los Angeles Dodgers, but has since retired.

== Personal life ==
His literature on the 2nd Amendment, "The Point of the Gun: The Definitive Straight-Shooting Guide to Choosing Firearms for Self Defense," is proudly sold on Amazon.
