= Ed Vosberg =

American baseball player (born 1961)

- Pitcher
- Born: September 28, 1961 (age 63); Tucson, Arizona, U.S.
- Batted: Left Threw: Left

MLB debut
- September 17, 1986, for the San Diego Padres

Last MLB appearance
- April 10, 2002, for the Montreal Expos

MLB statistics
- Win–loss record: 10–15
- Earned run average: 4.32
- Strikeouts: 179
- Stats at Baseball Reference

Teams
- San Diego Padres (1986); San Francisco Giants (1990); Oakland Athletics (1994); Texas Rangers (1995–1997); Florida Marlins (1997); San Diego Padres (1999); Arizona Diamondbacks (1999); Philadelphia Phillies (2000–2001); Montreal Expos (2002)

Career highlights and awards
- World Series champion (1997)
Medals
Men's baseball
Representing the United States
World Games
Gold medal – first place	1981 Santa Clara	Team competition
Baseball World Cup
Silver medal – second place	2001 Taipei	National team

Edward John Vosberg (born September 28, 1961) is a former left-handed relief pitcher in Major League Baseball who had a 10-year career (1986, 1990, 1994–1997, 1999–2002). He played with the San Diego Padres, San Francisco Giants, Florida Marlins, Arizona Diamondbacks, Philadelphia Phillies and Montreal Expos in the National League, and the Oakland A's and Texas Rangers in the American League.

He is one of only three players (Jason Varitek and Michael Conforto are the others) to play in the Little League World Series, the College World Series, and the Major League World Series, and is the only pitcher to have done so. He played first base for Tucson, Arizona in the 1973 Little League World Series final. He pitched a one-hitter in the semifinals against Birmingham, Michigan. He played for the 1980 NCAA champion University of Arizona. He then played for the Florida Marlins in the 1997 Major League World Series.

== Career ==
Ed Vosberg was drafted by the San Diego Padres in the 3rd round of the 1983 MLB draft. He began his professional career with the Single-A Reno Padres in the California League. Whilst with Reno he showed promise going 6–6 and sporting a 3.87 earned run average (ERA). After only 15 games with Reno Padres he was called up to the Double-A Beaumount Golden Gators. His brief stint there in 1983 yielded one game where he went 7 shutout innings only giving up 2 hits with 2 walks and 1 strikeout. Vosberg stayed in Double-A with the Golden Gators for the 1984 season improving to a 13–11 record with an ERA of 3.43 and 100 strikeouts.

He was promoted to the Triple-A roster in 1986 to the Las Vegas Stars where he went 7–8 with an ERA of 4.72. He also made his major league debut in 1986 on September 18 at the age of 24. He pitched in 5 games in 13 innings going 0–1 with an earned run average of 6.59. He returned to the Las Vegas Stars for the 1987 season. In December 1988, he was traded to the Houston Astros for Dan Walters. Vosberg remained in the Astros' system until 1989 when he was traded to the Dodgers and assigned to Triple-A Albuquerque. He became a free agent in 1990 and signed with the San Francisco Giants. During the 1990 season, Edward returned to the major league level. He pitched in 18 games with 24 innings pitched and an inflated 5.55 ERA. He was granted free agency after the 1990 season and spent the next 4 years in the minors with the Angels, Mariners, Cubs, and Athletics organizations and even played in the Italian League in 1992.

In 1994, he returned to the majors once again with the Oakland Athletics. He pitched in 16 games with a record of 0–2 and an ERA of 3.95. After the 1994 season, Vosberg was drafted by the Los Angeles Dodgers in the Supplemental Rule 5 draft. He was outrighted to the minors shortly after, refused the Minor League assignment and became a free agent. He then signed a minor league contract with the Rangers organization. The Rangers purchased his contract and Vosberg once again returned to the big leagues. He pitched in 44 games out of the bullpen and put up his best numbers 5–5 and an earned ERA of 3.00. He returned to the Texas Rangers in 1996 and had another respectable season out of the Ranger's bullpen going 1–1 with an ERA of 3.27 and finishing 21 games. 1997 was his final season as a Texas Ranger he was traded to the Florida Marlins for Rick Helling. His overall record with both clubs in 1997 was 2 wins, 3 losses, 1 save and an ERA of 4.42 As a member of the 1997 Florida Marlins, Vosberg won a World Series ring. He pitched in the postseason and had 5 strikeouts, giving up 5 hits and 3 walks. His ERA in the 1997 World Series was 6.00.

After his stint with the Marlins, he was traded to the San Diego Padres for minor leaguer Chris Clark on November 20, 1997. He missed the 1998 season due to injury and did not pitch at all. At the age of 37, Vosberg returned to the majors and played with the San Diego Padres. His time with the Padres was limited and his numbers were terrible. His record with the Padres was 0–0 with an ERA of 9.72. He sustained a shoulder injury and was placed on the 15-day disabled list. A few months after rehab, he was released by the Padres on June 7, 1999. He was picked up by the Arizona Diamondbacks a few days later on June 18, 1999. His numbers improved with the move to Arizona, going 0–1 with an ERA of 3.38 in four games. His entire Arizona Diamondback career was those 4 games. He was designated for assignment once more. He returned to the minor league with yet another organization: the Colorado Rockies.

At the age of 38, the Rockies traded Vosberg to the Philadelphia Phillies on June 28, 2000, in part of a conditional deal. He once again found his way onto a major league roster with the Phillies in 2000. He went 1–1 in 31 games with an earned run average of 4.13. He played in 2001 with the Phillies and put up his best ERA in his career at a 2.84 clip out of the Phillies’ bullpen. However, once again after the 2001 season he was granted free agency and picked up by the Montreal Expos. His Canadian career was short-lived, only pitching in four games and stacking up an ERA of 18.00. On April 18, 2002, Vosberg refused a minor league assignment and became a free agent once more.

He made a comeback attempt in the Mexican leagues in 2006–07 at the age of 45. Vosberg was quoted as saying, "The last couple of years I have gotten the itch. When I retired five years ago I think I still could have done it physically, but mentally it is such a grind. It is such a great life, but it is a grind. It is difficult being away from your family. I needed these years to get the love of the game back and get on the field again." In his final seasons in the Mexican leagues he had a combined record of 7–8 with an ERA of 4.14.
