= Mike Garcia (baseball, born 1968) =

American baseball player

Guerreros de Oaxaca
- Pitcher / Pitching coach
- Born: May 11, 1968 (age 58); Riverside, California, U.S.
- Batted: Right Threw: Right

MLB debut
- September 10, 1999, for the Pittsburgh Pirates

Last MLB appearance
- May 20, 2000, for the Pittsburgh Pirates

MLB statistics
- Win–loss record: 1–2
- Earned run average: 7.36
- Strikeouts: 18
- Stats at Baseball Reference

Teams
- Wei Chuan Dragons (1996–1998); Pittsburgh Pirates (1999–2000); Samsung Lions (2000); Uni-President Lions (2004–2005)

Career highlights and awards
- 2x Taiwan Series champion (1997-1998); 2x CPBL MVP (1997, 2004)

Michael R. Garcia (born May 11, 1968) is an American former professional baseball pitcher and current pitching coach for the Guerreros de Oaxaca of the Mexican League. He played parts of two seasons in Major League Baseball for the Pittsburgh Pirates. He also played in Mexico, Taiwan, and Korea.

Mike Garcia played at John W. North High School in Riverside, CA and was drafted in the 7th round of the 1986 amateur draft by the Boston Red Sox. He then played at Riverside City College (RCC) and was drafted by the Detroit Tigers in the 55th round of the 1989 amateur draft. Mike Garcia played his first professional season with the Detroit Tigers' rookie league Bristol Tigers and Class A (short season) Niagara Falls Rapids in 1989.

In 1997 Mike Garcia became the first American-born player to be named the Chinese Professional Baseball League MVP. He won the award again in 2004.

On September 10, 1999 Mike Garcia made his MLB debut for the Pittsburgh Pirates. He played at the Triple-A level for the Pittsburgh Pirates, Baltimore Orioles, and the Chicago Cubs. He finished his career with the Road Warriors of the Atlantic League of Professional Baseball in 2007

Mike Garcia was an Area Scout for the Philadelphia Phillies until 2020, signing Mickey Moniak (2016).

In 2021, Mike Garcia joined the staff of the Rocky Mountain Vibes of the Pioneer League, as their pitching coach. In 2023, he returned to the Wei Chuan Dragons as their pitching coordinator.
