= Alex Hernández (baseball) =

Puerto Rican baseball player (born 1977)

Alex Hernandez
- Infielder / Outfielder
- Born: May 28, 1977 (age 49); San Juan, Puerto Rico
- Batted: Left Threw: Left

MLB debut
- September 1, 2000, for the Pittsburgh Pirates

Last MLB appearance
- August 10, 2001, for the Pittsburgh Pirates

MLB statistics
- Batting average: .183
- Runs: 4
- Hits: 13
- Stats at Baseball Reference

Teams
- Pittsburgh Pirates (2000–2001)

Alexander Vargas Hernández (born May 28, 1977) is a Puerto Rican former Major League Baseball (MLB) infielder and outfielder. He played during two seasons at the Major League level for the Pittsburgh Pirates. He was drafted by the Pirates in the 4th round of the 1995 amateur draft. Hernández played his first professional season with their Rookie league Gulf Coast Pirates in 1995, and his last season with independent Atlantic League's Lancaster Barnstormers in 2006. He played his last affiliated season in 2002 for the Cincinnati Reds' Double-A Chattanooga Lookouts and Triple-A Louisville Bats.

== See also ==
- List of Major League Baseball players from Puerto Rico
