= Tarrik Brock =

American baseball player & coach (born 1973)

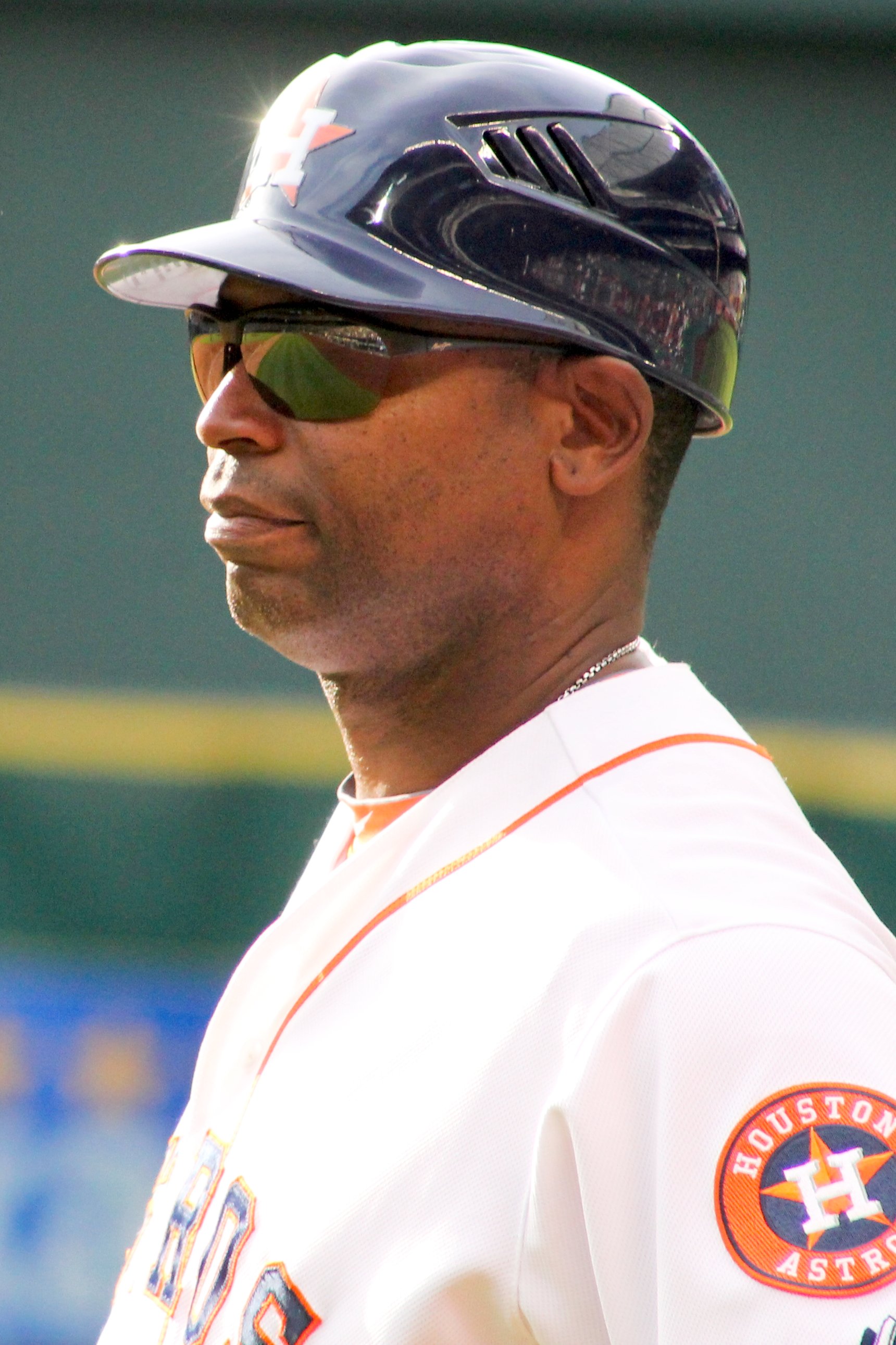
- Brock with the Houston Astros

Pittsburgh Pirates – No. 16
- Outfielder / Coach
- Born: December 25, 1973 (age 52); Goleta, California, U.S.
- Batted: Left Threw: Left

MLB debut
- March 29, 2000, for the Chicago Cubs

Last MLB appearance
- April 22, 2000, for the Chicago Cubs

MLB statistics
- Batting average: .167
- Home runs: 0
- Runs batted in: 0
- Stats at Baseball Reference

Teams
- As player: Chicago Cubs (2000); As coach: Houston Astros (2014); San Diego Padres (2016); Pittsburgh Pirates (2020–present)

Tarrik Jumaan Brock (born December 25, 1973) is an American former professional baseball player and current coach. He is the first base coach for the Pittsburgh Pirates of Major League Baseball (MLB). An outfielder who batted and threw left-handed, he played part of one season in MLB for the Chicago Cubs. He has coached in MLB for the Houston Astros and San Diego Padres.

== Playing career ==
Brock was originally drafted by the Detroit Tigers in the 2nd round of the 1991 amateur draft. Of the eleven second-round draftees who made the major leagues, he was the last to make his debut. After six years in the Tigers' system, spent mostly at the A-ball level, Brock was selected by the Seattle Mariners in the Rule 5 draft. Brock spent two seasons in Seattle's minor league system before being released in January 1999.

On April 8 of that year, Brock was signed by the Colorado Rockies and assigned to their AA affiliate, Carolina. He was sent to the Cubs on July 7 as the player to be named later in a trade made on March 28, before he was even under contract with the Rockies. The Rockies in return obtained two prospects, John Cotton and Kevin Rawitzer, neither of whom made the major leagues.

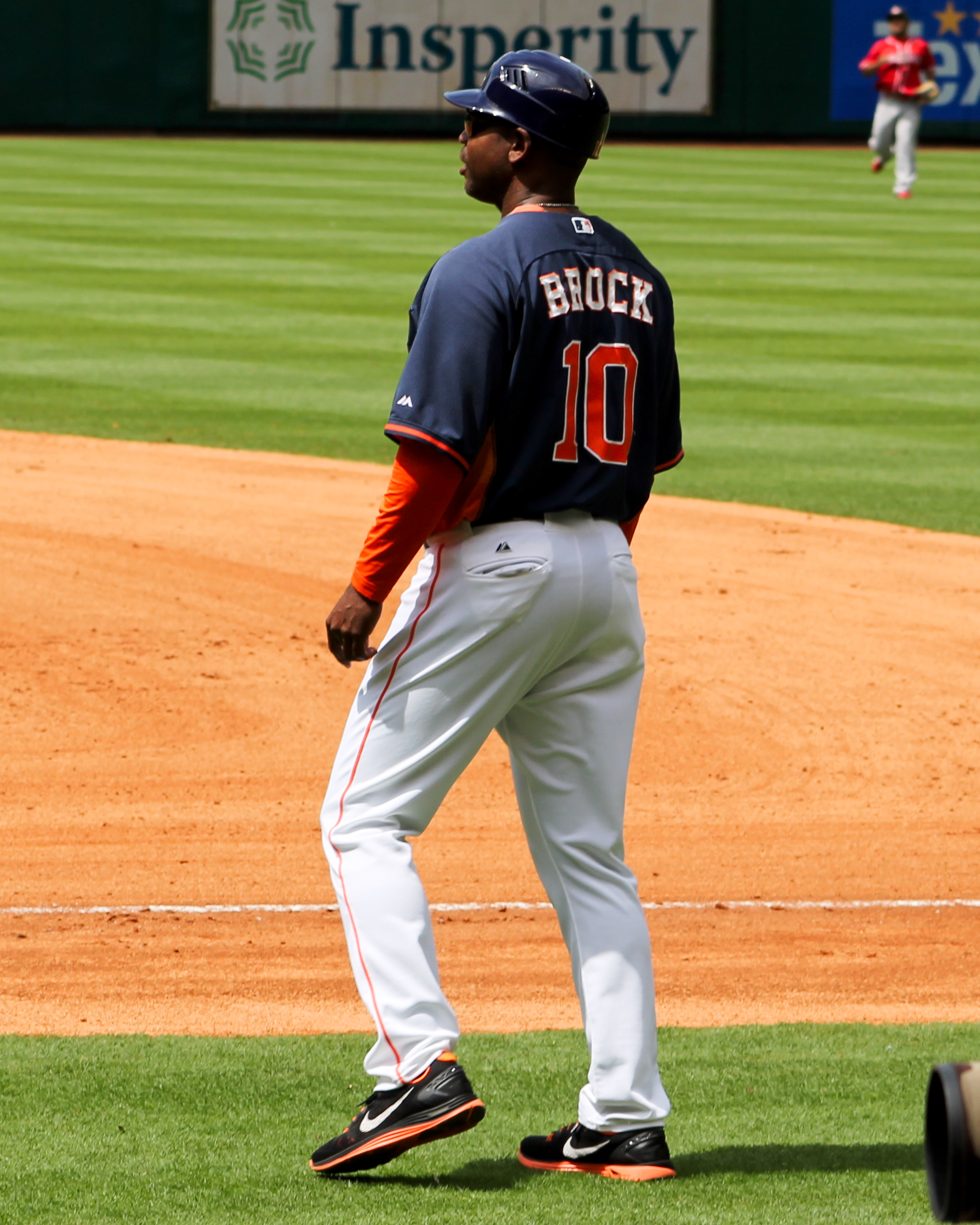
Brock in 2014

Brock hit only .217 in 54 games with the Cubs' AA affiliate at West Tennessee that season, but nevertheless made the Cubs' major league roster in spring training of 2000. He made his major league debut on March 29, 2000, appearing as a left fielder in the Cubs' Opening Day game against the New York Mets in the Tokyo Dome in Japan. He is the first MLB player to make his debut in Japan. He faced Rich Rodriguez in his first major league at bat and singled to right field. Sammy Sosa was thrown out at home on the play, ending the inning.

Brock stayed with the team through April 22, but struggled, managing only one other hit, a single off Vladimir Núñez on April 16. He was sent back to Iowa and never made it back to the major leagues. Brock played in the independent Northern League in 2001 and was named an All-Star, but a comeback in 2002 and 2003 with the Los Angeles Dodgers organization failed to get him back to the game's highest level. For his major league career, Brock hit .167 (2-for-12), had 4 walks, 4 strikeouts, and stole one base.

== Coaching career ==
In 2006, he served as a coach with the Ogden Raptors. From 2007 through 2013, Brock worked as the Florida Marlins' outfield and baserunning coordinator. During 2010, he served as interim first base coach.

In 2014, Brock was the first base coach for the Houston Astros. He joined the San Diego Padres organization as a minor league coordinator for the 2015 season, before becoming their first base coach before the 2016 season.

In 2017, he joined the Los Angeles Dodgers organization as outfield/baserunning coordinator.

Brock was hired by the Pittsburgh Pirates as their first base coach prior to the 2020 season.
