= Mike Mahoney (catcher) =

American baseball player (born 1972)

- Catcher
- Born: December 5, 1972 (age 53); Des Moines, Iowa, U.S.
- Batted: Right Threw: Right

MLB debut
- September 8, 2000, for the Chicago Cubs

Last MLB appearance
- September 24, 2005, for the St. Louis Cardinals

MLB statistics
- Batting average: .180
- Home runs: 1
- Runs batted in: 10
- Stats at Baseball Reference

Teams
- Chicago Cubs (2000, 2002); St. Louis Cardinals (2005)

Michael John Mahoney (born December 5, 1972) is an American Major League Baseball catcher, formerly with the St. Louis Cardinals. He made his major league debut on September 8, 2000 with the Chicago Cubs, and after two seasons in Chicago, he was released and eventually signed with St. Louis. He started a stretch of games while primary catcher Yadier Molina was injured in 2005, but was not re-signed by the Cardinals after the season. Most recently, he played for the Iowa Cubs in 2007.
