= Danny Young (pitcher, born 1971) =

American baseball player (1971–2023)

- Pitcher
- Born: November 3, 1971; Woodbury, Tennessee, U.S.
- Died: June 11, 2023 (aged 51); Dowelltown, Tennessee, U.S.
- Batted: Right Threw: Left

MLB debut
- March 30, 2000, for the Chicago Cubs

Last MLB appearance
- April 6, 2000, for the Chicago Cubs

MLB statistics
- Win–loss record: 0–1
- Earned run average: 21.00
- Strikeouts: 0
- Stats at Baseball Reference

Teams
- Chicago Cubs (2000)

Daniel Bracy Young (November 3, 1971 – June 11, 2023) was an American professional baseball pitcher. He appeared in four games in Major League Baseball for the Chicago Cubs in 2000.

Young was drafted by the Houston Astros in the 83rd round of the 1990 Major League Baseball draft.

Young had a very brief career in the major leagues, pitching in only four games for the Chicago Cubs during the 2000 season. His most memorable outing was likely his major league debut on March 30, 2000, against the New York Mets at the Tokyo Dome in Tokyo, Japan. In that contest, Young was summoned to pitch the top of the 11th inning with the goal of preserving a 1–1 tie. He quickly recorded the first two outs, but then loaded the bases before surrendering a grand slam home run to the Mets' Benny Agbayani. The four runs allowed proved to be the margin of victory, as the Cubs failed to score in the bottom of the inning and fell to the Mets 5–1.

Young died in Dowelltown, Tennessee, on June 11, 2023, at the age of 51.
