= Nate Rolison =

American baseball player (born 1977)

- First baseman
- Born: March 27, 1977 (age 48); Hattiesburg, Mississippi, U.S.
- Batted: Left Threw: Right

MLB debut
- September 5, 2000, for the Florida Marlins

Last MLB appearance
- September 30, 2000, for the Florida Marlins

MLB statistics
- Batting average: .077
- Home runs: 0
- Runs batted in: 2
- Stats at Baseball Reference

Teams
- Florida Marlins (2000)

Nathan Mardis Rolison (born March 27, 1977) is an American former professional baseball first baseman. He played in Major League Baseball (MLB) in 2000 for the Florida Marlins. He batted left and threw right-handed.

== Career ==
Rolison attended Petal High School in Mississippi where he carried a 4.0 grade point average and was named the state's high school baseball player of the year. He was selected by the Marlins in the second round of the 1995 MLB draft and, according to the Sun-Sentinel, was the highest-rated power hitter in that year's draft. He committed to play college baseball at Miami over a competing offer from Stanford and, according to Miami recruiter Turtle Thomas, was the first recruit ever to do so. He ultimately elected to sign with the Marlins and received a then-record signing bonus.

Rolison made his Major League debut in September 2000 and struggled in his limited time in the majors. His only Major League hit, a single, came off of Wayne Gomes in the penultimate game of the season. That fall, while working out with the Southern Miss Golden Eagles baseball team, Rolison broke three bones in his wrist, an injury which required surgery and which Rolison later called "the beginning of the end" of his career. He would never return to the Major Leagues.
