= Brian Smith (baseball) =

American baseball player (born 1972)

- Pitcher
- Born: September 17, 1972 (age 53); Salisbury, North Carolina, U.S.
- Batted: Right Threw: Right

MLB debut
- September 11, 2000, for the Pittsburgh Pirates

Last MLB appearance
- September 15, 2000, for the Pittsburgh Pirates

MLB statistics
- Win–loss record: 0–0
- Earned run average: 10.38
- Strikeouts: 3
- Stats at Baseball Reference

Teams
- Pittsburgh Pirates (2000)

Randall Brian Smith (born September 17, 1972) is a retired Major League Baseball pitcher.

== Playing career ==
He played during one season at the major league level for the Pittsburgh Pirates. He was drafted by the Toronto Blue Jays in the 27th round of the 1994 Major League Baseball draft. Smith played his first professional season with their Rookie league Medicine Hat Blue Jays in 1994, and his last season with the Triple-A affiliate of the Colorado Rockies, the Colorado Springs Sky Sox, in 2003.
