= Chris Brock =

American baseball player (born 1970)

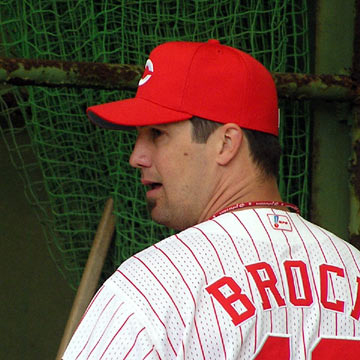
- Pitcher
- Born: February 5, 1970 (age 56); Orlando, Florida, U.S.
- Batted: Right Threw: Right

MLB debut
- June 11, 1997, for the Atlanta Braves

Last MLB appearance
- September 28, 2002, for the Baltimore Orioles

MLB statistics
- Win–loss record: 18–17
- Earned run average: 4.81
- Strikeouts: 227
- Stats at Baseball Reference

Teams
- Atlanta Braves (1997); San Francisco Giants (1998–1999); Philadelphia Phillies (2000–2001); Baltimore Orioles (2002); Hiroshima Toyo Carp (2003)

Terence Christopher Brock (born February 5, 1970) is an American former professional baseball pitcher, who played in Major League Baseball (MLB) from 1997–2002 for the Atlanta Braves, San Francisco Giants, Philadelphia Phillies, and Baltimore Orioles. He played the 2003 season for the Hiroshima Toyo Carp of Nippon Professional Baseball (NPB).

In 2000 and 2001 Brock was a combined 10–8 with a 4.29 ERA in 82 relief appearances and 5 starts with the Phillies.

While with the Phillies, Brock complained to Phillies GM Ed Wade about Harry Kalas sitting in the back of the plane (the area usually only occupied by players) on road trips. Wade subsequently banished Kalas from the back of the plane. However, this situation was quickly rectified, as Kalas was revered by most of the Phillies players who enjoyed having him sit with them.

In 2002, Brock's only season with the Orioles, he went 2–1 with a 4.70 earned run average in 22 relief appearances. He was released on October 1, 2002.
