= Keith Osik =

American baseball player and coach (born 1968)

Farmingdale State Rams
- Catcher / Coach
- Born: October 22, 1968 (age 58); Port Washington, New York, U.S.
- Batted: Right Threw: Right

MLB debut
- April 5, 1996, for the Pittsburgh Pirates

Last MLB appearance
- October 1, 2005, for the Washington Nationals

MLB statistics
- Batting average: .231
- Home runs: 13
- Runs batted in: 108
- Stats at Baseball Reference

Teams
- Pittsburgh Pirates (1996–2002); Milwaukee Brewers (2003); Baltimore Orioles (2004); Washington Nationals (2005)

Keith Richard Osik (born October 22, 1968) is an American former professional baseball catcher. He played in Major League Baseball (MLB) for the Pittsburgh Pirates, Milwaukee Brewers, Baltimore Orioles, and Washington Nationals from 1996–2005. He was drafted in the 24th round of the 1990 MLB draft. He was born in Port Washington, New York, and grew up in Shoreham, New York, where he now lives.

Osik is the head baseball coach at Farmingdale State College, a Division III institution located on Long Island in New York. He was inducted into the Suffolk Sports Hall of Fame on Long Island in the Baseball Category with the Class of 2008.

Osik's brother Steve pitched in the minor leagues in 1998 and 1999. Osik's son Tyler was drafted by the Chicago White Sox in 2019 and played in the minors through 2023.
