= Steve Sparks (pitcher, born 1975) =

American baseball player

- Pitcher
- Born: March 28, 1975 (age 49); Mobile, Alabama
- Batted: Right Threw: Right

MLB debut
- July 19, 2000, for the Pittsburgh Pirates

Last MLB appearance
- August 2, 2000, for the Pittsburgh Pirates

MLB statistics
- Win–loss record: 0–0
- Earned run average: 6.75
- Strikeouts: 2
- Stats at Baseball Reference

Teams
- Pittsburgh Pirates (2000)

Stephen L. Sparks (born March 28, 1975) is a retired Major League Baseball pitcher. He played during one season at the major league level for the Pittsburgh Pirates. He was drafted by the Pirates in the 28th round of the 1998 amateur draft. Sparks played his first professional season with their Class A (Short Season) Erie SeaWolves and Class A Augusta GreenJackets in 1998, and split his last season with the Triple-A affiliates of the Oakland Athletics (Sacramento River Cats) and San Diego Padres (Portland Beavers) in 2005.
