= Reggie Taylor =

American baseball player (born 1977)

- Outfielder
- Born: January 12, 1977 (age 49); Newberry, South Carolina, U.S.
- Batted: Left Threw: Right

MLB debut
- September 17, 2000, for the Philadelphia Phillies

Last MLB appearance
- June 22, 2005, for the Kansas City Royals

MLB statistics
- Batting average: .231
- Home runs: 14
- Runs batted in: 58
- Stats at Baseball Reference

Teams
- Philadelphia Phillies (2000–2001); Cincinnati Reds (2002–2003); Tampa Bay Devil Rays (2005)

Reginald Tremain "Reggie" Taylor (born January 12, 1977) is an American former professional baseball outfielder. He played for the Philadelphia Phillies, Cincinnati Reds, and Tampa Bay Devil Rays during his five-year Major League Baseball career. He is 6 feet 1 inch (1.85 m) tall and weighs 178 pounds (81 kg). Taylor bats left-handed and throws right-handed.

Taylor was drafted by the Philadelphia Phillies in the 1st round (14th overall pick) of the 1995 Major League Baseball draft on June 1, 1995, and signed with the Phillies on June 13, 1995.

== Early career ==
In 1999, in the Philadelphia Phillies minor league system, Taylor managed to hit 10 triples. While playing winter baseball in the offseason, Taylor dislocated his shoulder. The injury required surgery and Taylor did not play winter baseball again until May of 2000. When he returned from his injury in the 2000 baseball season, he joined the lineup of Triple-A Scranton/Wilkes-Barre. Two games after coming back from his injury, Taylor became the second Scranton player ever to collect 5 hits in a game. During the season, Taylor played in 89 games and matched his career high of 15 home runs. The Philadelphia Phillies called Taylor up from their minor league system in September of that season.

== Major League career ==
Taylor made his Major League debut on September 17, 2000, at the age of 23. Taylor collected his first Major League hit on September 29, 2000.

Taylor played two baseball seasons with the Philadelphia Phillies. On March 28, 2002, Taylor was traded by the Philadelphia Phillies to the Cincinnati Reds for a player to be named later. That player was Héctor Mercado who the Cincinnati Reds traded to the Philadelphia Phillies to complete the trade on March 30, 2002. Taylor was granted free agency on December 21, 2003, only to be signed again by Cincinnati on January 19, 2004. On June 30, 2004, Taylor was released by the Cincinnati Reds and signed as a free agent with the Chicago White Sox, on July 9, 2004. Taylor was again granted free agency on October 15, 2004. On December 23, 2004, Taylor signed as a free agent with the Colorado Rockies. Spending about two months with the Colorado Rockies, Taylor was traded by the Rockies to the Tampa Bay Devil Rays for Bobby Seay, on April 8, 2005. Taylor was then released by the Tampa Bay Devil Rays on July 20, 2005, and was signed only six days later by the St. Louis Cardinals, on July 26, 2005. Taylor was granted free agency once more on October 15, 2005.

In 2006, Taylor played for the Lancaster Barnstormers of the independent Atlantic League, batting .302 with 23 homers and 77 RBI. In 2007, he played in only 15 games for the Long Island Ducks. In 2008, Taylor played for the Atlanta Braves' Triple-A affiliate, the Richmond Braves and Olmecas de Tabasco of the Mexican League. He batted .353 for Olmecas de Tabasco, but only .248 for Richmond. In 2009, he split his season between the independent Sioux Falls Canaries and the Olmecas and Dorados de Chihuahua of the Mexican League.

On October 10, 2009, Taylor signed with the Kansas City Royals, but never played a game in their organization. He returned to the Olmecas in 2010.
