= Joey Nation =

American baseball player (born 1978)

- Pitcher
- Born: September 28, 1978 (age 47); Oklahoma City, Oklahoma, U.S.
- Batted: Left Threw: Left

MLB debut
- September 23, 2000, for the Chicago Cubs

Last MLB appearance
- September 28, 2000, for the Chicago Cubs

MLB statistics
- Win–loss record: 0–2
- Earned run average: 6.94
- Strikeouts: 8
- Stats at Baseball Reference

Teams
- Chicago Cubs (2000)

Joseph Paul Nation (born September 28, 1978) is an American former professional baseball pitcher. Nation played in Major League Baseball (MLB) for the Chicago Cubs in 2000.
