= Phil Norton =

American baseball player (born 1976)

- Pitcher
- Born: February 1, 1976 (age 50); Texarkana, Texas, U.S.
- Batted: Right Threw: Left

MLB debut
- August 3, 2000, for the Chicago Cubs

Last MLB appearance
- October 2, 2004, for the Cincinnati Reds

MLB statistics
- Win–loss record: 2–6
- Earned run average: 5.07
- Strikeouts: 61
- Stats at Baseball Reference

Teams
- Chicago Cubs (2000, 2003); Cincinnati Reds (2003–2004)

Phillip Douglas Norton (born February 1, 1976) is an American former professional baseball pitcher. He played in the major leagues from 2000-2004 for the Chicago Cubs and the Cincinnati Reds. He played in the independent Atlantic League from 2006 to 2007.

On August 8, 2000, in just his second start at the Major League level, Norton surrendered a Major League record tying four home runs in one inning against the Los Angeles Dodgers. Norton, along with 37 other Major League pitchers, including Cy Young Award winners Randy Johnson, Zack Greinke, Justin Verlander, and John Smoltz were tied for the most home runs allowed in an inning until July 27, 2017, when Michael Blazek of the Milwaukee Brewers allowed four consecutive home-runs, followed by a pop out, and one more home run in the inning (for a record-breaking 5 HR's allowed), during his first ever Major League start.
