= Tom Jacquez =

American baseball player

Thomas "Hawk" Jacquez
- Pitcher
- Born: December 29, 1975 (age 50); Stockton, California, U.S.
- Batted: Left Threw: Left

MLB debut
- September 9, 2000, for the Philadelphia Phillies

Last MLB appearance
- September 30, 2000, for the Philadelphia Phillies

MLB statistics
- Win–loss record: 0-0
- Earned run average: 11.05
- Strikeouts: 6
- Saves: 1
- Stats at Baseball Reference

Teams
- Philadelphia Phillies (2000)

Thomas Patrick Jacquez (born December 29, 1975) is an American former professional baseball player. A left-handed pitcher, he played part of one season in Major League Baseball in 2000 for the Philadelphia Phillies. Jacquez was drafted by the Phillies in the 1997 amateur draft. He played for the minor-league Piedmont Boll Weevils, Batavia Clippers, Clearwater Phillies, Reading Phillies, and Scranton/Wilkes-Barre Red Barons before being called up to the Phillies in September 2000. Jacquez pitched in nine games for the Phillies in September 2000, earning an earned-run average of 11.05. In eight minor league seasons, Jacquez logged 43W, 681.1IP, 461K, and 192BB.

== College career ==
Thomas (he began to favor his full name in college) went on a full scholarship to the University of California at Los Angeles. He also considered various other schools: the University of Southern California, University of California at Berkeley, University of Arizona, Arizona State, and Santa Clara University (where his father had pitched). In 1995, the Daily Bruin called him part of “maybe the most heralded freshman recruiting class in recent UCLA baseball history.” That group also included three other future big-leaguers: slugger Troy Glaus, Eric Byrnes, and Jim Parque. The next year they added one more, Eric Valent.

Even in college, Jacquez was a pitcher, not a thrower, as L.A.’s Daily News described. “He throws in the mid-to-upper 80 mph range and is more than just a crafty left-hander. He has a changeup known as ‘The Floating Butterfly.’ It is made even more effective because of his sneaky fastball. ‘He really commands his pitches,’ Bruins coach Gary Adams said. ‘He really doesn’t beat himself.’”

Jacquez was a dedicated athlete. Dan Keller, a teammate and fellow pitcher at UCLA, started a baseball instruction company called Lifeletics. On its website, he presents a series of Life Lessons, #3 being “Work Hard.” As part of this lesson, he recalled, “Thomas Jacquez...would rise at 9:00 AM every morning and go for a run. Whether it was pouring rain or scorching hot, Tom would roll out of bed for a morning jog.”

Jacquez made the Bruins starting rotation as a freshman in 1995. However, he missed most of his sophomore year after an emergency appendectomy in February 1996. “I had a bad stomach ache for a day,” he said a year later. “I thought it was food poisoning. It progressively got worse as the night went on. The next morning, I went to the emergency room. When something like this happens and prevents you from doing something you love, it is real hard mentally and physically. You don’t realize how much you appreciate something until you can’t do it anymore. I don’t take anything for granted anymore. Every outing I’m pitching like it could be my last one. I’m giving it 100 percent every time.’”

Weighing the medical risks, Thomas was prepared to return if the Bruins needed him, but instead he got back in action during the summer of 1996 with the Cotuit Kettleers of the Cape Cod Baseball League. He went 2-1, 2.14 and got his nickname "Hawk" from his host family. He then rebounded strongly as a redshirt sophomore, posting a 10-4 record with a 3.06 ERA and leading the Bruins with 129.1 innings pitched. UCLA won the NCAA’s Midwest Regional tournament, although Harvard surprised Jacquez in the opener, winning 7-3. The Bruins made it to the College World Series as the #4 seed before losing two tough games to Miami and Mississippi State.

== Professional career ==
On the recommendation of area scout Mark Ralston, the Phillies selected Jacquez in the sixth round of the 1997 amateur draft (he was eligible because he had junior standing). He said in 2011, “My childhood dream was to pitch in the major leagues. By leaving early, I was able to take one step closer to achieving my goal.” A couple of weeks later, he signed and reported to Batavia in the NY-Penn League. After going 2-1 with a 2.42 ERA in four starts, he went to Piedmont of the Class A South Atlantic League in July. There he was 2-4, 4.97 in eight starts.

For 1998, Jacquez rose to Clearwater in the Florida State League (high Class A) where he posted 9-11, 4.50 as he started 28 of 29 games. Late that July, he pitched a one-hit shutout and gave up no walks. He did enough to rise to the next level, Double-A Reading, in 1999. After a win over New Britain in late May, the Reading Eagle wrote, “Far from overpowering, Thomas Jacquez uses control and finesse...Jacquez started to laugh Sunday afternoon when an out of-town reporter anointed him the new ace of the Reading Phillies staff. ‘I wouldn’t say that,’ said Jacquez.” He had already yielded 11 homers that season and added, “Every game is a battle for me. I’m a groundball pitcher. If I get the ball up, you saw what happens.”

For the first time, Jacquez also began to pitch more often as a reliever; he started 14 times in 38 games and earned a promotion to Philadelphia’s Triple-A affiliate, the Scranton/Wilkes-Barre Barons, for the last week of their season. The Philadelphia Daily News indicated on August 30 that he might even get a September call-up to the big club, but that was not the case (although he pitched well in three relief appearances for the Barons).

Jacquez started the 2000 season back at Reading, but after posting a 2.96 ERA in 13 games, he climbed to Scranton/Wilkes-Barre once again (despite an 0-3 record). With the Barons, he got four saves behind primary closer Kirk Bullinger, going 5-1, 1.98 in 35 games with one start. Baseball Prospectus wrote, “His progress this year as a reliever is apparently a product of minor-league pitching coach Gorman Heimueller’s work with him.”

In early September, Jacquez got his call to the big leagues as Philadelphia purchased his contract. “He’s here to give us an extra arm in the bullpen,” said manager Terry Francona.

After 2000, Jacquez played in the minor leagues for several seasons. He played for Scranton/Wilkes-Barre in 2001 before joining the Chicago White Sox farm system for the 2002 season. That year Thomas had season-ending Tommy John surgery. Jacquez played for the Charlotte Knights and Great Falls White Sox over 2002 and 2003. He entered the Baltimore Orioles farm system and played for the Bowie Baysox in 2004, after which he voluntarily retired from pro baseball due to shoulder injury.

== Personal life ==
Thomas returned to get his college degree and graduated with honors in 2005 with a BA from University of San Francisco (USF) . From 2005-2014, he worked at a private, independent college preparatory high school, The Urban School of San Francisco, where he coached baseball and taught Spanish and Service Learning. He has also served as a site director for seven years with Aim High, a San Francisco educational non-profit that provides summer academic and social learning opportunities for low income middle school youth. He served on the Aim High Board of Trustees for four years. Thomas earned his MA in 2013 from USF and has been accepted as a doctoral student. His private practice, Pitchinthezone.com was born one year into his doctoral program.
