= Brant Brown =

American baseball player and coach (born 1971)

- Outfielder / Coach
- Born: June 22, 1971 (age 55); Porterville, California, U.S.
- Batted: Left Threw: Left

MLB debut
- June 15, 1996, for the Chicago Cubs

Last MLB appearance
- August 29, 2000, for the Chicago Cubs

MLB statistics
- Batting average: .247
- Home runs: 45
- Runs batted in: 146
- Stats at Baseball Reference

Teams
- As player: Chicago Cubs (1996–1998); Pittsburgh Pirates (1999); Florida Marlins (2000); Chicago Cubs (2000); As coach: Los Angeles Dodgers (2018–2022); Miami Marlins (2023); Seattle Mariners (2024); St. Louis Cardinals (2025–2026)

Brant Michael Brown (born June 22, 1971) is an American professional baseball coach and former outfielder. He played in Major League Baseball (MLB) from 1996 through 2000 for the Chicago Cubs, Pittsburgh Pirates, and Florida Marlins. He has coached for the Los Angeles Dodgers, Miami Marlins, Seattle Mariners, and St. Louis Cardinals. He also played college baseball for the Fresno State Bulldogs.

== Playing career ==
Brown attended Monache High School in Porterville, California, and California State University, Fresno, where he played college baseball for the Fresno State Bulldogs.

The Chicago Cubs selected Brown in the third round, with the 81st overall selection, in the 1992 Major League Baseball draft. In his first season, he had a .274 batting average for the Peoria Chiefs of the Class A Midwest League. The next year, he hit .342 with the Daytona Cubs of the Class A-Advanced Florida State League and the Orlando Cubs of the Class AA Southern League.

On June 15, 1996, Brown made his major league debut, hitting .304 in 69 at-bats that season.

On June 18, 1998, Brown hit three home runs in one game.

On September 23, 1998, the Cubs were tied with the New York Mets for the National League wild card with three games remaining. In a game against the Milwaukee Brewers that day, Chicago held a 7–5 lead in the bottom of the 9th inning. Milwaukee loaded the bases with two outs for Geoff Jenkins, who hit a long fly ball to Brown that should have ended the game. Brown, though, dropped the ball, which then got past him, allowing three runs to score and giving the Brewers an 8–7 win. The Cubs then faced the San Francisco Giants in a one-game playoff to break the tie for the Wild Card, which the Cubs won. He hit .291 with 14 home runs and 48 runs batted in (RBIs) on the 1998 season.

After the 1998 season, the Cubs traded Brown to the Pittsburgh Pirates for pitcher Jon Lieber.

Though primarily a left fielder, the Pirates had Brown open the season as their starting center fielder. It didn't work, and the Pirates replaced Brown in their starting lineup with José Guillén in May. Brown hit .232 with 16 home runs and 58 RBIs with 114 strikeouts in 341 at-bats for the Pirates in 1999.

After the 1999 season, the Pirates traded Brown to the Florida Marlins for Bruce Aven.

On June 9, 2000, Brown was involved in a three-team trade, in which he was sent to the Cubs, while Dave Martinez went to the Texas Rangers and the Marlins received Chuck Smith. In August, the Cubs sent Brown to the Iowa Cubs of the Triple-A Pacific Coast League (PCL), replacing him with Ross Gload.

Granted free agency after the 2000 season, Brown signed with the Brewers for the 2001 season. He played in the minor leagues for the Indianapolis Indians of the Triple-A International League and the Memphis Redbirds of the PCL, the Triple-A affiliate of the St. Louis Cardinals.

Brown then played for the Schaumburg Flyers of the independent Northern League in 2003.

== Coaching career ==
After ending his playing career, Brown became a minor league hitting coach in the Rangers' organization. He spent the 2007 and 2008 seasons as the hitting coach for the Bakersfield Blaze of the High-A California League. In 2009, he joined the Frisco RoughRiders of the Double-A Texas League. After three seasons with Frisco, he spent the 2012 season with the Round Rock Express of the PCL.

After the 2012 season, the Seattle Mariners hired Brown as their minor league outfield and baserunning coordinator.

On December 1, 2017, he was hired by the Los Angeles Dodgers to share the dual role of assistant hitting coach and minor league hitting coordinator with Luis Ortiz. For the 2019 season, he was promoted to the new position of hitting strategist.

On November 27, 2022, Brown was hired to be the hitting coach for the Miami Marlins.

On December 7, 2023, Brown was hired to be the offensive coordinator and bench coach for the Seattle Mariners. However, after the Mariners offense struggled to begin the 2024 season, the Mariners fired Brown on May 31.

On October 22, 2024, Brown was hired to be the hitting coach for the St. Louis Cardinals.
