= Joe Strong (baseball, born 1962) =

American baseball player (born 1962)

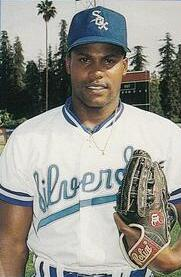
- Strong with the Reno Silver Sox in 1988
- Pitcher
- Born: September 9, 1962 (age 64); Fairfield, California, U.S.
- Batted: Switch Threw: Right

Professional debut
- CPBL: March 17, 1990, for the Wei Chuan Dragons
- MLB: May 11, 2000, for the Florida Marlins

Last appearance
- CPBL: June 15, 1996, for the China Times Eagles
- MLB: May 5, 2001, for the Florida Marlins

CPBL statistics
- Win–loss record: 47–33
- Earned run average: 2.71
- Strikeouts: 385

KBO statistics
- Win–loss record: 6–5
- Earned run average: 2.95
- Strikeouts: 54

MLB statistics
- Win–loss record: 1–1
- Earned run average: 5.81
- Strikeouts: 22
- Stats at Baseball Reference

Teams
- Wei Chuan Dragons (1990–1992); China Times Eagles (1996); Hyundai Unicorns (1998); Florida Marlins (2000–2001)

Career highlights and awards
- Taiwan Series champion (1990)

Joseph Benjamin Strong (born September 9, 1962) is an American former professional baseball pitcher. Strong played for the Florida Marlins of Major League Baseball (MLB) from 2000 to 2001.

== Career ==
Strong attended the University of California, Riverside, where he played college baseball for the Highlanders during the 1984 season. He was drafted by the Oakland Athletics in the 15th round of the 1984 MLB draft. He was a replacement player during spring training in 1995, and was barred from joining the Major League Baseball Players Association. After being released by the Chicago Cubs organization in 1995 and playing for the independent Surrey Glaciers of the Western Baseball League, he was inactive for two years, but returned to play in the Korea Baseball Organization in 1998. In February 1999, he signed with the Tampa Bay Devil Rays, became a free agent at the end of the season, and signed with the Florida Marlins in February 2000. After having played in five countries over 16 years, Strong made his MLB debut for the Marlins on May 11, 2000, becoming the oldest MLB rookie in 40 years.

On June 17, 2000, Strong picked up his only MLB save. He retired the final out of the 11th inning to preserve a 4-3 Marlins victory over the Pirates. He played for the Marlins again in 2001 and became a free agent after the season ended. In 2002, he played for the Milwaukee Brewers' Triple-A affiliate, the Indianapolis Indians. In 2004, his final season, he played for the independent Camden Riversharks of the Atlantic League.
