= 2000 Arizona Diamondbacks season =

2000 Arizona Diamondbacks
- League: National League
- Division: West
- Ballpark: Bank One Ballpark
- City: Phoenix, Arizona
- Record: 85–77 (.525)
- Divisional place: 3rd
- Owners: Ken Kendrick; Jerry Colangelo
- General managers: Joe Garagiola Jr.
- Managers: Buck Showalter
- Television: FSN Arizona; KTVK (3TV) (Thom Brennaman, Greg Schulte, Bob Brenly, Joe Garagiola)
- Radio: KTAR (620 AM) (Thom Brennaman, Rod Allen, Greg Schulte); KSUN (Spanish) (Jose Tolentino, Ivan Lara)
- Stats: ESPN.com; Baseball Reference

The 2000 Arizona Diamondbacks season was the franchise's 3rd season in Major League Baseball and their 3rd season at Bank One Ballpark in Phoenix, Arizona, as members of the National League West.

They looked to improve on their 1999 season, in which they won 100 games in just their second season. They looked to contend in what was a strong National League West. They finished the season with a record of 85–77, good enough for third place in the division.

== Offseason ==
- November 15, 1999: Ken Huckaby was signed as a free agent with the Arizona Diamondbacks.
- November 22, 1999: Ernie Young was released by the Arizona Diamondbacks.
- December 15, 1999: Dante Powell was traded by the Arizona Diamondbacks to the St. Louis Cardinals for Luis Ordaz.
- March 20, 2000: Craig Counsell was signed as a free agent with the Arizona Diamondbacks.

== Regular season ==
Randy Johnson tied a modern record with six victories in April 2000. He would lead the league in strikeouts with 347 and in winning percentage (.731). Johnson won his third Cy Young Award, and became the third National League pitcher to win the trophy in consecutive seasons. Johnson recorded his 3000th strikeout on September 10, 2000, as he whiffed Florida Marlins' third baseman Mike Lowell.

=== Opening Day starters ===
- Jay Bell
- Erubiel Durazo
- Steve Finley
- Luis Gonzalez
- Lenny Harris
- Randy Johnson
- Travis Lee
- Damian Miller
- Tony Womack

=== Notable transactions ===
- June 2, 2000: Bill Pulsipher was traded by the New York Mets to the Arizona Diamondbacks for Lenny Harris.
- June 5, 2000: Brandon Webb was drafted by the Arizona Diamondbacks in the 8th round of the 2000 amateur draft. Player signed June 6, 2000.
- July 26, 2000: Curt Schilling was traded by the Philadelphia Phillies to the Arizona Diamondbacks for Omar Daal, Nelson Figueroa, Travis Lee, and Vicente Padilla.

=== Season standings ===
NL West
Team	W	L	Pct.	GB	Home	Road
San Francisco Giants	97	65	.599	—	55‍–‍26	42‍–‍39
Los Angeles Dodgers	86	76	.531	11	44‍–‍37	42‍–‍39
Arizona Diamondbacks	85	77	.525	12	47‍–‍34	38‍–‍43
Colorado Rockies	82	80	.506	15	48‍–‍33	34‍–‍47
San Diego Padres	76	86	.469	21	41‍–‍40	35‍–‍46

=== Record vs. opponents ===
2000 National League record Source: NL Standings Head-to-Head
Team	AZ	ATL	CHC	CIN	COL	FLA	HOU	LAD	MIL	MON	NYM	PHI	PIT	SD	SF	STL	AL
Arizona	—	3–6	5–4	2–5	7–6	4–5	6–1	7–6	4–5	4–5	2–7	8–1	7–2	9–4	6–7	5–4	6–9
Atlanta	6–3	—	4–5	2–5	5–4	6–6	5–4	7–2	6–3	6–7	7–6	8–5	5–2	8–1	6–3	3–4	11–7
Chicago	4–5	5–4	—	4–8	4–5	1–6	5–7	3–6	6–7	4–5	2–5	6–3	3–9	3–5	4–5	3–10	8–7
Cincinnati	5–2	5–2	8–4	—	6–3	3–6	7–5	4–5	5–8–1	6–3	5–4	3–4	7–6	4–5	3–6	7–6	7–8
Colorado	6–7	4–5	5–4	3–6	—	4–5	5–4	4–9	4–5	7–2	3–6	6–3	7–2	7–6	6–7	5–3	6–6
Florida	5–4	6–6	6–1	6–3	5–4	—	3–5	2–7	3–4	7–6	6–6	9–4	5–4	2–7	3–6	3–6	8–9
Houston	1–6	4–5	7–5	5–7	4–5	5–3	—	3–6	7–6	4–5	2–5	5–4	10–3	2–7	1–8	6–6	6–9
Los Angeles	6–7	2–7	6–3	5–4	9–4	7–2	6–3	—	3–4	5–3	4–5	5–4	4–5	8–5	7–5	3–6	6–9
Milwaukee	5–4	3–6	7–6	8–5–1	5–4	4–3	6–7	4–3	—	4–5	2–7	2–5	7–5	2–7	3–6	5–7	6–9
Montreal	5–4	7–6	5–4	3–6	2–7	6–7	5–4	3–5	5–4	—	3–9	5–7	3–4	3–6	3–6	2–5	7–11
New York	7–2	6–7	5–2	4–5	6–3	6–6	5–2	5–4	7–2	9–3	—	6–7	7–2	3–6	3–5	6–3	9–9
Philadelphia	1–8	5–8	3–6	4–3	3–6	4–9	4–5	4–5	5–2	7–5	7–6	—	3–6	2–5	2–7	2–7	9–9
Pittsburgh	2–7	2–5	9–3	6–7	2–7	4–5	3–10	5–4	5–7	4–3	2–7	6–3	—	7–2	2–6	4–8	6–9
San Diego	4–9	1–8	5–3	5–4	6–7	7–2	7–2	5–8	7–2	6–3	6–3	5–2	2–7	—	5–7	0–9	5–10
San Francisco	7–6	3–6	5–4	6–3	7–6	6–3	8–1	5–7	6–3	6–3	5–3	7–2	6–2	7–5	—	5–4	8–7
St. Louis	4–5	4–3	10–3	6–7	3–5	6–3	6–6	6–3	7–5	5–2	3–6	7–2	8–4	9–0	4–5	—	7–8

=== Game log ===
Legend
Diamondbacks Win	Diamondbacks Loss	Game postponed

2000 Regular Season Game Log (85–77) (Home: 47–34; Road: 38–43)
April (16–9) (Home: 8–5; Road: 8–4)

#	Date	Opponent	Score	Win	Loss	Save	Stadium	Attendance	Record	Report
1	April 4	Phillies	6–4	Johnson	Ashby	Holmes (1)	Bank One Ballpark	44,298	1–0	Philadelphia Phillies at Arizona Diamondbacks Box Score, April 4, 2000
2	April 5	Phillies	11–3	Stottlemyre	Byrd	Morgan (1)	Bank One Ballpark	29,291	2–0	Philadelphia Phillies at Arizona Diamondbacks Box Score, April 5, 2000
3	April 6	Phillies	3–2 (11)	Springer	Schrenk	None	Bank One Ballpark	28,774	3–0	Philadelphia Phillies at Arizona Diamondbacks Box Score, April 5, 2000
4	April 7	Pirates	2–7	Christiansen	Reynoso	None	Bank One Ballpark	32,536	3–1	Pittsburgh Pirates at Arizona Diamondbacks Box Score, April 7, 2000
5	April 8	Pirates	6–5	Swindell	Christiansen	None	Bank One Ballpark	33,298	4–1	Pittsburgh Pirates at Arizona Diamondbacks Box Score, April 8, 2000
6	April 9	Pirates	1–0	Johnson	Schmidt	None	Bank One Ballpark	34,204	5–1	Pittsburgh Pirates at Arizona Diamondbacks Box Score, April 9, 2000
7	April 10	@ Padres	8–4	Stottlemyre	Williams	Morgan (2)	Qualcomm Stadium	60,021	6–1	Arizona Diamondbacks at San Diego Padres Box Score, April 10, 2000
8	April 11	@ Padres	2–3 (13)	Whisenant	Springer	None	Qualcomm Stadium	19,035	6–2	Arizona Diamondbacks at San Diego Padres Box Score, April 11, 2000
9	April 12	@ Padres	2–4	Meadows	Reynoso	Hoffman (1)	Qualcomm Stadium	15,801	6–3	Arizona Diamondbacks at San Diego Padres Box Score, April 12, 2000
10	April 13	@ Padres	5–4	Anderson	Hitchcock	Morgan (3)	Qualcomm Stadium	28,131	7–3	Arizona Diamondbacks at San Diego Padres Box Score, April 13, 2000
11	April 14	@ Giants	3–1	Johnson	Hernandez	None	Pacific Bell Park	40,930	8–3	Arizona Diamondbacks at San Francisco Giants Box Score, April 14, 2000
12	April 15	@ Giants	7–4	Stottlemyre	Ortiz	Swindell (1)	Pacific Bell Park	40,930	9–3	Arizona Diamondbacks at San Francisco Giants Box Score, April 15, 2000
13	April 17	Rockies	1–9	Yoshii	Daal	None	Bank One Ballpark	33,743	9–4	Colorado Rockies at Arizona Diamondbacks Box Score, April 17, 2000
14	April 18	Rockies	7–1	Reynoso	Karl	None	Bank One Ballpark	30,275	10–4	Colorado Rockies at Arizona Diamondbacks Box Score, April 18, 2000
15	April 19	Rockies	8–7	Morgan	Tavarez	Kim (1)	Bank One Ballpark	31,237	11–4	Colorado Rockies at Arizona Diamondbacks Box Score, April 19, 2000
16	April 20	Rockies	3–0	Johnson	Arrojo	None	Bank One Ballpark	34,458	12–4	Colorado Rockies at Arizona Diamondbacks Box Score, April 20, 2000
17	April 21	Giants	5–11	Ortiz	Stottlemyre	None	Bank One Ballpark	40,929	12–5	San Francisco Giants at Arizona Diamondbacks Box Score, April 21, 2000
18	April 22	Giants	6–8	Rueter	Daal	Nen (3)	Bank One Ballpark	45,659	12–6	San Francisco Giants at Arizona Diamondbacks Box Score, April 22, 2000
19	April 23	Giants	7–12	Nathan	Reynoso	None	Bank One Ballpark	35,879	12–7	San Francisco Giants at Arizona Diamondbacks Box Score, April 23, 2000
20	April 25	@ Phillies	10–2	Johnson	Brock	None	Veterans Stadium	11,926	13–7	Arizona Diamondbacks at Philadelphia Phillies Box Score, April 25, 2000
21	April 26	@ Phillies	10–4	Stottlemyre	Ashby	None	Veterans Stadium	12,250	14–7	Arizona Diamondbacks at Philadelphia Phillies Box Score, April 26, 2000
22	April 27	@ Phillies	4–5	Gomes	Kim	None	Veterans Stadium	13,560	14–8	Arizona Diamondbacks at Philadelphia Phillies Box Score, April 27, 2000
23	April 28	@ Cubs	5–6	Tapani	Springer	Aguilera (5)	Wrigley Field	27,507	14–9	Arizona Diamondbacks at Chicago Cubs Box Score, April 28, 2000
24	April 29	@ Cubs	7–4 (10)	Mantei	Guthrie	Morgan (4)	Wrigley Field	37,484	15–9	Arizona Diamondbacks at Chicago Cubs Box Score, April 29, 2000
25	April 30	@ Cubs	6–0	Johnson	Lorraine	None	Wrigley Field	37,274	16–9	Arizona Diamondbacks at Chicago Cubs Box Score, April 30, 2000

May (17–10) (Home: 12–3; Road: 5–7)

#	Date	Opponent	Score	Win	Loss	Save	Stadium	Attendance	Record	Report
26	May 2	@ Brewers	5–1	Stottlemyre	Haynes	None	Milwaukee County Stadium	8,281	17–9	Arizona Diamondbacks at Milwaukee Brewers Box Score, May 2, 2000
27	May 3	@ Brewers	1–4	Estrada	Daal	Wickman (4)	Milwaukee County Stadium	9,600	17–10	Arizona Diamondbacks at Milwaukee Brewers Box Score, May 3, 2000
28	May 4	@ Brewers	6–2	Reynoso	Stull	Kim (2)	Milwaukee County Stadium	8,401	18–10	Arizona Diamondbacks at Milwaukee Brewers Box Score, May 4, 2000
29	May 5	Padres	5–3	Johnson	Hitchcock	None	Bank One Ballpark	42,297	19–10	San Diego Padres at Arizona Diamondbacks Box Score, May 5, 2000
30	May 6	Padres	10–5	Anderson	Lopez	None	Bank One Ballpark	36,827	20–10	San Diego Padres at Arizona Diamondbacks Box Score, May 6, 2000
31	May 7	Padres	8–1	Stottlemyre	Clement	None	Bank One Ballpark	38,060	21–10	San Diego Padres at Arizona Diamondbacks Box Score, May 7, 2000
32	May 8	Dodgers	15–7	Daal	Park	None	Bank One Ballpark	33,338	22–10	Los Angeles Dodgers at Arizona Diamondbacks Box Score, May 8, 2000
33	May 9	Dodgers	11–7 (12)	Padilla	Hershiser	None	Bank One Ballpark	32,326	23–10	Los Angeles Dodgers at Arizona Diamondbacks Box Score, May 9, 2000
34	May 10	Dodgers	2–1	Kim	Adams	None	Bank One Ballpark	43,345	24–10	Los Angeles Dodgers at Arizona Diamondbacks Box Score, May 10, 2000
35	May 12	@ Padres	6–4	Anderson	Clement	Kim (3)	Qualcomm Stadium	24,391	25–10	Arizona Diamondbacks at San Diego Padres Box Score, May 12, 2000
36	May 13	@ Padres	6–2	Stottlemyre	Spencer	Morgan (5)	Qualcomm Stadium	44,044	26–10	Arizona Diamondbacks at San Diego Padres Box Score, May 13, 2000
37	May 14	@ Padres	1–3	Meadows	Daal	Hoffman (6)	Qualcomm Stadium	31,555	26–11	San Diego Padres at Arizona Diamondbacks Box Score, May 7, 2000
38	May 16	@ Expos	0–2	Vazquez	Johnson	Hermanson (2)	Olympic Stadium	11,898	26–12	Arizona Diamondbacks at Montreal Expos Box Score, May 16, 2000
39	May 17	@ Expos	2–10	Pavano	Reynoso	None	Olympic Stadium	8,766	26–13	Arizona Diamondbacks at Montreal Expos Box Score, May 17, 2000
40	May 18	@ Expos	8–6	Kim	Telford	None	Olympic Stadium	11,073	27–13	San Diego Padres at Arizona Diamondbacks Box Score, May 7, 2000
41	May 19	@ Mets	3–4	Jones	Stottlemyre	Benitez (10)	Shea Stadium	25,292	27–14	Arizona Diamondbacks at New York Mets Box Score, May 19, 2000
42	May 20	@ Mets	7–8	Hampton	Daal	Benitez (11)	Shea Stadium	37,121	27–15	Arizona Diamondbacks at New York Mets Box Score, May 20, 2000
43	May 21	@ Mets	6–7	Wendell	Kim	None	Shea Stadium	38,826	27–16	Arizona Diamondbacks at New York Mets Box Score, May 21, 2000
44	May 23	Pirates	6–1	Anderson	Anderson	None	Bank One Ballpark	31,726	28–16	Pittsburgh Pirates at Arizona Diamondbacks Box Score, May 23, 2000
45	May 24	Pirates	6–5	Stottlemyre	Schmidt	Kim (4)	Bank One Ballpark	30,462	29–16	Pittsburgh Pirates at Arizona Diamondbacks Box Score, May 24, 2000
46	May 25	Pirates	1–0	Daal	Benson	Mantei (1)	Bank One Ballpark	30,759	30–16	Pittsburgh Pirates at Arizona Diamondbacks Box Score, May 25, 2000
47	May 26	Brewers	9–2	Johnson	Snyder	None	Bank One Ballpark	34,846	31–16	Milwaukee Brewers at Arizona Diamondbacks Box Score, May 26, 2000
48	May 27	Brewers	7–3	Reynoso	Acevedo	Kim (5)	Bank One Ballpark	35,163	32–16	Milwaukee Brewers at Arizona Diamondbacks Box Score, May 27, 2000
49	May 28	Brewers	3–4 (11)	Wickman	Swindell	None	Bank One Ballpark	35,121	32–17	Milwaukee Brewers at Arizona Diamondbacks Box Score, May 28, 2000
50	May 29	Cardinals	0–3	Stephenson	Stottlemyre	None	Bank One Ballpark	47,014	32–18	St. Louis Cardinals at Arizona Diamondbacks Box Score, May 29, 2000
51	May 30	Cardinals	1–6	Ankiel	Daal	Morris (1)	Bank One Ballpark	36,180	32–19	St. Louis Cardinals at Arizona Diamondbacks Box Score, May 30, 2000
52	May 31	Cardinals	6–2	Johnson	Hentgen	Kim (6)	Bank One Ballpark	39,761	33–19	St. Louis Cardinals at Arizona Diamondbacks Box Score, May 31, 2000

June (13–14) (Home: 10–5; Road: 3–9)

#	Date	Opponent	Score	Win	Loss	Save	Stadium	Attendance	Record	Report
53	June 1	Cardinals	4–0	Reynoso	Benes	None	Bank One Ballpark	37,131	34–19	St. Louis Cardinals at Arizona Diamondbacks Box Score, June 1, 2000
54	June 2	@ Rangers	5–4	Anderson	Helling	Mantei (2)	The Ballpark in Arlington	40,770	35–19	Arizona Diamondbacks at Texas Rangers Box Score, June 2, 2000
55	June 3	@ Rangers	3–4	Rogers	Figueroa	Wetteland (14)	The Ballpark in Arlington	46,222	35–20	Arizona Diamondbacks at Texas Rangers Box Score, June 3, 2000
56	June 4	@ Rangers	6–7	Perisho	Kim	Wetteland (15)	The Ballpark in Arlington	46,336	35–21	Arizona Diamondbacks at Texas Rangers Box Score, June 4, 2000
57	June 5	@ Cubs	3–4 (10)	Heredia	Mantei	None	Wrigley Field	32,197	35–22	Arizona Diamondbacks at Chicago Cubs Box Score, June 5, 2000
58	June 6	@ Cubs	1–4	Tapani	Reynoso	None	Wrigley Field	35,933	35–23	Arizona Diamondbacks at Chicago Cubs Box Score, June 6, 2000
59	June 7	@ Cubs	4–9	Downs	Anderson	Van Poppel (2)	Wrigley Field	37,596	35–24	Arizona Diamondbacks at Chicago Cubs Box Score, June 7, 2000
60	June 9	Angels	4–1	Johnson	Cooper	Kim (7)	Bank One Ballpark	39,468	36–24	Anaheim Angels at Arizona Diamondbacks Box Score, June 9, 2000
61	June 10	Angels	3–10	Washburn	Daal	None	Bank One Ballpark	35,213	36–25	Anaheim Angels at Arizona Diamondbacks Box Score, June 10, 2000
62	June 11	Angels	3–2	Plesac	Schoeneweis	Kim (8)	Bank One Ballpark	36,349	37–25	Anaheim Angels at Arizona Diamondbacks Box Score, June 11, 2000
63	June 12	@ Dodgers	4–2	Anderson	Dreifort	Kim (9)	Dodger Stadium	25,552	38–25	Arizona Diamondbacks at Los Angeles Dodgers Box Score, June 12, 2000
64	June 13	@ Dodgers	1–6	Park	Morgan	None	Dodger Stadium	34,067	38–26	Arizona Diamondbacks at Los Angeles Dodgers Box Score, June 13, 2000
65	June 14	@ Dodgers	5–1	Johnson	Perez	None	Dodger Stadium	27,332	39–26	Arizona Diamondbacks at Los Angeles Dodgers Box Score, June 14, 2000
66	June 15	@ Dodgers	0–4	Brown	Stottlemyre	None	Dodger Stadium	30,103	39–27	Arizona Diamondbacks at Los Angeles Dodgers Box Score, June 15, 2000
67	June 17	@ Rockies	5–14	Bohanon	Anderson	None	Coors Field	48,043	39–28	Arizona Diamondbacks at Colorado Rockies Box Score, June 17, 2000
68	June 18	@ Rockies	2–19	Yoshi	Reynoso	None	Coors Field	48,117	39–29	Arizona Diamondbacks at Colorado Rockies Box Score, June 18, 2000
69	June 19	Padres	3–2	Padilla	Kolb	None	Bank One Ballpark	37,336	40–29	San Diego Padres at Arizona Diamondbacks Box Score, June 19, 2000
70	June 20	Padres	1–3	Tollberg	Stottlemyre	Hoffman (18)	Bank One Ballpark	30,011	40–30	San Diego Padres at Arizona Diamondbacks Box Score, June 20, 2000
71	June 21	Padres	11–8	Morgan	Reyes	None	Bank One Ballpark	33,003	41–30	San Diego Padres at Arizona Diamondbacks Box Score, June 19, 2000
72	June 23	Rockies	2–0	Anderson	Bohanon	Kim (10)	Bank One Ballpark	37,089	42–30	Colorado Rockies at Arizona Diamondbacks Box Score, June 23, 2000
73	June 24	Rockies	0–4	Yoshii	Johnson	None	Bank One Ballpark	42,559	42–31	Colorado Rockies at Arizona Diamondbacks Box Score, June 24, 2000
74	June 25	Rockies	8–3	Morgan	Astacio	None	Bank One Ballpark	35,887	43–31	Colorado Rockies at Arizona Diamondbacks Box Score, June 25, 2000
75	June 26	Astros	6–1	Reynoso	Dotel	Kim (11)	Bank One Ballpark	31,338	44–31	Houston Astros at Arizona Diamondbacks Box Score, June 26, 2000
76	June 27	Astros	4–12	Elarton	Daal	None	Bank One Ballpark	30,115	44–32	Houston Astros at Arizona Diamondbacks Box Score, June 27, 2000
77	June 28	Astros	6–2	Anderson	Lima	Kim (12)	Bank One Ballpark	29,540	45–32	Houston Astros at Arizona Diamondbacks Box Score, June 28, 2000
78	June 29	Astros	7–1	Johnson	Reynolds	None	Bank One Ballpark	31,518	46–32	Houston Astros at Arizona Diamondbacks Box Score, June 29, 2000
79	June 30	Reds	4–5	Harnisch	Morgan	Graves (12)	Bank One Ballpark	38,197	46–33	Cincinnati Reds at Arizona Diamondbacks Box Score, June 30, 2000

July (12–14) (Home: 5–6; Road: 7–8)

#	Date	Opponent	Score	Win	Loss	Save	Stadium	Attendance	Record	Report
80	July 1	Reds	9–6	Springer	Fernandez	Kim (13)	Bank One Ballpark	39,385	47–33	Cincinnati Reds at Arizona Diamondbacks Box Score, July 1, 2000
81	July 2	Reds	2–14	Neagle	Daal	None	Bank One Ballpark	39,841	47–34	Cincinnati Reds at Arizona Diamondbacks Box Score, July 2, 2000
82	July 3	Reds	2–3	Parris	Anderson	Graves (13)	Bank One Ballpark	38,287	47–35	Cincinnati Reds at Arizona Diamondbacks Box Score, July 3, 2000
83	July 4	@ Astros	10–4	Johnson	Lima	None	Enron Field	42,147	48–35	Arizona Diamondbacks at Houston Astros Box Score, July 4, 2000
84	July 5	@ Astros	12–9	Morgan	Valdes	Kim (14)	Enron Field	36,218	49–35	Arizona Diamondbacks at Houston Astros Box Score, July 5, 2000
85	July 6	@ Astros	2–1	Guzman	Holt	Mantei (3)	Enron Field	36,471	50–35	Arizona Diamondbacks at Houston Astros Box Score, July 6, 2000
86	July 7	@ Athletics	4–5 (11)	Tam	Daal	None	Network Associates Coliseum	17,287	50–36	Arizona Diamondbacks at Oakland Athletics Box Score, July 7, 2000
87	July 8	@ Athletics	7–8 (10)	Isringhausen	Swindell	None	Network Associates Coliseum	54,268	50–37	Arizona Diamondbacks at Oakland Athletics Box Score, July 8, 2000
88	July 9	@ Athletics	4–2	Johnson	Heredia	Mantei (4)	Network Associates Coliseum	25,513	51–37	Arizona Diamondbacks at Oakland Athletics Box Score, July 9, 2000
89	July 13	Rangers	4–6	Zimmerman	Kim	Wetteland (22)	Bank One Ballpark	32,541	51–38	Texas Rangers at Arizona Diamondbacks Box Score, July 13, 2000
90	July 14	Rangers	6–1	Reynoso	Rogers	None	Bank One Ballpark	34,415	52–38	Texas Rangers at Arizona Diamondbacks Box Score, July 14, 2000
91	July 15	Rangers	5–6 (11)	Zimmerman	Swindell	Wetteland (23)	Bank One Ballpark	37,856	52–39	Texas Rangers at Arizona Diamondbacks Box Score, July 15, 2000
92	July 16	Mariners	3–6	Mesa	Springer	Sasaki (21)	Bank One Ballpark	34,144	52–40	Seattle Mariners at Arizona Diamondbacks Box Score, July 16, 2000
93	July 17	Mariners	7–0	Guzman	Halama	None	Bank One Ballpark	35,504	53–40	Seattle Mariners at Arizona Diamondbacks Box Score, July 17, 2000
94	July 18	Mariners	2–5	Rhodes	Padilla	Sasaki (22)	Bank One Ballpark	32,090	53–41	Seattle Mariners at Arizona Diamondbacks Box Score, July 18, 2000
95	July 19	Cardinals	4–3	Reynoso	Stephenson	Mantei (5)	Bank One Ballpark	37,119	54–41	St. Louis Cardinals at Arizona Diamondbacks Box Score, July 19, 2000
96	July 20	Cardinals	3–2	Johnson	Veres	None	Bank One Ballpark	40,937	55–41	St. Louis Cardinals at Arizona Diamondbacks Box Score, July 20, 2000
97	July 21	@ Reds	5–4	Swindell	Sullivan	Mantei (6)	Cinergy Field	46,101	56–41	Arizona Diamondbacks at Cincinnati Reds Box Score, July 21, 2000
98	July 22	@ Reds	3–7	Villone	Guzman	None	Cinergy Field	42,568	56–42	Arizona Diamondbacks at Cincinnati Reds Box Score, July 22, 2000
99	July 23	@ Reds	3–5	Dessens	Anderson	Graves (17)	Cinergy Field	34,822	56–43	Arizona Diamondbacks at Cincinnati Reds Box Score, July 23, 2000
100	July 25	@ Cardinals	3–7	Stephenson	Johnson	None	Busch Memorial Stadium	44,454	56–44	Arizona Diamondbacks at St. Louis Cardinals Box Score, July 25, 2000
101	July 26	@ Cardinals	4–8	Kile	Reynoso	None	Busch Memorial Stadium	42,762	56–45	Arizona Diamondbacks at St. Louis Cardinals Box Score, July 26, 2000
102	July 27	@ Cardinals	17–5	Guzman	Ankiel	None	Busch Memorial Stadium	42,963	57–45	Arizona Diamondbacks at St. Louis Cardinals Box Score, July 27, 2000
103	July 28	@ Marlins	4–1	Schilling	Cornelius	Mantei (7)	Pro Player Stadium	12,584	58–45	Arizona Diamondbacks at Florida Marlins Box Score, July 28, 2000
104	July 29	@ Marlins	2–4	Miceli	Kim	Alfonseca (30)	Pro Player Stadium	15,860	58–46	Arizona Diamondbacks at Florida Marlins Box Score, July 29, 2000
105	July 30	@ Marlins	3–4	Almanza	Morgan	Alfonseca (31)	Pro Player Stadium	16,770	58–47	Arizona Diamondbacks at Florida Marlins Box Score, July 30, 2000

August (15–12) (Home: 7–8; Road: 8–4)

#	Date	Opponent	Score	Win	Loss	Save	Stadium	Attendance	Record	Report
106	August 1	Braves	2–4	Millwood	Swindell	Remlinger (10)	Bank One Ballpark	35,138	58–48	Atlanta Braves at Arizona Diamondbacks Box Score, August 1, 2000
107	August 2	Braves	2–0	Schilling	Maddux	None	Bank One Ballpark	40,643	59–48	Atlanta Braves at Arizona Diamondbacks Box Score, August 2, 2000
108	August 3	Braves	8–4	Anderson	Ashby	None	Bank One Ballpark	35,441	60–48	Atlanta Braves at Arizona Diamondbacks Box Score, August 3, 2000
109	August 4	Mets	1–6	Reed	Johnson	Cook (2)	Bank One Ballpark	41,832	60–49	New York Mets at Arizona Diamondbacks Box Score, August 4, 2000
110	August 5	Mets	2–6	Jones	Guzman	White (3)	Bank One Ballpark	41,656	60–50	New York Mets at Arizona Diamondbacks Box Score, August 5, 2000
111	August 6	Mets	9–5	Reynoso	Rusch	Mantei (8)	Bank One Ballpark	39,641	61–50	New York Mets at Arizona Diamondbacks Box Score, August 6, 2000
112	August 7	Expos	5–2	Schilling	Moore	None	Bank One Ballpark	31,526	62–50	Montreal Expos at Arizona Diamondbacks Box Score, August 7, 2000
113	August 8	Expos	3–9	Lira	Anderson	None	Bank One Ballpark	33,113	62–51	Montreal Expos at Arizona Diamondbacks Box Score, August 8, 2000
114	August 9	Expos	3–4	Strickland	Guzman	Telford (2)	Bank One Ballpark	39,641	62–52	Montreal Expos at Arizona Diamondbacks Box Score, August 9, 2000
115	August 11	@ Pirates	6–1	Reynoso	Serafini	None	Three Rivers Stadium	25,281	63–52	Arizona Diamondbacks at Pittsburgh Pirates Box Score, August 11, 2000
116	August 12	@ Pirates	6–9	Sauerbeck	Schilling	None	Three Rivers Stadium	34,101	63–53	Arizona Diamondbacks at Pittsburgh Pirates Box Score, August 12, 2000
117	August 13	@ Pirates	7–6	Morgan	Arroyo	Mantei (9)	Three Rivers Stadium	25,321	64–53	Arizona Diamondbacks at Pittsburgh Pirates Box Score, August 13, 2000
118	August 14	@ Phillies	4–3 (11)	Plesac	Brantley	Mantei (10)	Veterans Stadium	14,083	65–53	Arizona Diamondbacks at Philadelphia Phillies Box Score, August 14, 2000
119	August 15	@ Phillies	11–6	Kim	Gomes	None	Veterans Stadium	16,949	66–53	Arizona Diamondbacks at Philadelphia Phillies Box Score, August 15, 2000
120	August 16	@ Phillies	5–1	Reynoso	Chen	None	Veterans Stadium	23,498	67–53	Arizona Diamondbacks at Philadelphia Phillies Box Score, August 16, 2000
121	August 18	Cubs	11–2	Schilling	Quevedo	None	Bank One Ballpark	44,440	68–53	Chicago Cubs at Arizona Diamondbacks Box Score, August 18, 2000
122	August 19	Cubs	11–3	Anderson	Lieber	None	Bank One Ballpark	47,404	69–53	Chicago Cubs at Arizona Diamondbacks Box Score, August 19, 2000
123	August 20	Cubs	5–4	Johnson	Rain	None	Bank One Ballpark	43,636	70–53	Chicago Cubs at Arizona Diamondbacks Box Score, August 20, 2000
124	August 21	Brewers	8–16	Stull	Reynoso	None	Bank One Ballpark	31,752	70–54	Milwaukee Brewers at Arizona Diamondbacks Box Score, August 21, 2000
125	August 22	Brewers	3–4	D'Amico	Guzman	Leskanic (7)	Bank One Ballpark	31,057	70–55	Milwaukee Brewers at Arizona Diamondbacks Box Score, August 22, 2000
126	August 23	Brewers	5–8	Haynes	Schilling	Leskanic (8)	Bank One Ballpark	29,954	70–56	Milwaukee Brewers at Arizona Diamondbacks Box Score, August 23, 2000
127	August 25	@ Mets	3–13	Reed	Johnson	None	Shea Stadium	38,237	70–57	Arizona Diamondbacks at New York Mets Box Score, August 25, 2000
128	August 26	@ Mets	5–1 (10)	Plesac	White	None	Shea Stadium	43,985	71–57	Arizona Diamondbacks at New York Mets Box Score, August 26, 2000
129	August 27	@ Mets	1–2	Hampton	Reynoso	Benitez (35)	Shea Stadium	42,277	71–58	Arizona Diamondbacks at New York Mets Box Score, August 27, 2000
130	August 28	@ Expos	5–9	Thurman	Schilling	Telford (3)	Olympic Stadium	6,389	71–59	Arizona Diamondbacks at Montreal Expos Box Score, August 28, 2000
131	August 29	@ Expos	8–7	Plesac	Forster	Mantei (11)	Olympic Stadium	6,029	72–59	Arizona Diamondbacks at Montreal Expos Box Score, August 29, 2000
132	August 30	@ Expos	7–0	Johnson	Lira	None	Olympic Stadium	7,650	73–59	Arizona Diamondbacks at Montreal Expos Box Score, August 30, 2000

September (12–17) (Home: 5–6; Road: 7–11)

#	Date	Opponent	Score	Win	Loss	Save	Stadium	Attendance	Record	Report
133	September 1	Marlins	7–8 (11)	Darensbourg	Swindell	Alfonseca (38)	Bank One Ballpark	31,791	73–60	Florida Marlins at Arizona Diamondbacks Box Score, September 1, 2000
134	September 2	Marlins	1–10	Dempster	Schilling	None	Bank One Ballpark	38,422	73–61	Florida Marlins at Arizona Diamondbacks Box Score, September 2, 2000
135	September 3	Marlins	10–5	Kim	Burnett	None	Bank One Ballpark	36,039	74–61	Florida Marlins at Arizona Diamondbacks Box Score, September 3, 2000
136	September 5	@ Braves	2–5	Glavine	Johnson	Rocker (19)	Turner Field	29,722	73–62	Arizona Diamondbacks at Atlanta Braves Box Score, September 5, 2000
137	September 6	@ Braves	1–7	Millwood	Reynoso	None	Turner Field	25,529	74–63	Arizona Diamondbacks at Atlanta Braves Box Score, September 6, 2000
138	September 7	@ Braves	0–4	Maddux	Schilling	None	Turner Field	30,446	74–64	Arizona Diamondbacks at Atlanta Braves Box Score, September 7, 2000
139	September 8	@ Marlins	2–1	Kim	Bones	Mantei (12)	Pro Player Stadium	10,929	75–64	Arizona Diamondbacks at Florida Marlins Box Score, September 8, 2000
140	September 9	@ Marlins	4–1	Stottlemyre	Burnett	Mantei (13)	Pro Player Stadium	16,610	76–64	Arizona Diamondbacks at Florida Marlins Box Score, September 9, 2000
141	September 10	@ Marlins	3–4 (12)	Looper	Springer	None	Pro Player Stadium	13,117	76–65	Arizona Diamondbacks at Florida Marlins Box Score, September 10, 2000
142	September 11	Dodgers	3–6	Gagne	Reynoso	None	Bank One Ballpark	37,589	76–66	Los Angeles Dodgers at Arizona Diamondbacks Box Score, September 11, 2000
143	September 12	Dodgers	5–4	Kim	Masaoka	Mantei (14)	Bank One Ballpark	32,102	77–66	Los Angeles Dodgers at Arizona Diamondbacks Box Score, September 12, 2000
144	September 13	Dodgers	3–2	Plesac	Adams	None	Bank One Ballpark	34,526	78–66	Los Angeles Dodgers at Arizona Diamondbacks Box Score, September 13, 2000
145	September 15	Braves	2–1	Johnson	Glavine	Mantei (15)	Bank One Ballpark	39,774	79–66	Atlanta Braves at Arizona Diamondbacks Box Score, September 15, 2000
146	September 16	Braves	10–12	Burkett	Stottlemyre	Rocker (22)	Bank One Ballpark	41,470	79–67	Atlanta Braves at Arizona Diamondbacks Box Score, September 16, 2000
147	September 17	Braves	1–7	Millwood	Schilling	None	Bank One Ballpark	38,364	79–68	Atlanta Braves at Arizona Diamondbacks Box Score, September 17, 2000
148	September 18	@ Dodgers	1–7	Shaw	Swindell	None	Dodger Stadium	31,345	79–69	Arizona Diamondbacks at Los Angeles Dodgers Box Score, September 18, 2000
149	September 19	@ Dodgers	1–7	Park	Anderson	Shaw (26)	Dodger Stadium	29,753	79–70	Arizona Diamondbacks at Los Angeles Dodgers Box Score, September 19, 2000
150	September 20	@ Dodgers	1–7	Herges	Kim	None	Dodger Stadium	31,630	79–71	Arizona Diamondbacks at Los Angeles Dodgers Box Score, September 20, 2000
151	September 21	@ Giants	7–8	Henry	Morgan	Nen (39)	Pacific Bell Park	40,930	79–72	Arizona Diamondbacks at San Francisco Giants Box Score, September 21, 2000
152	September 22	@ Giants	7–1	Schilling	Gardner	None	Pacific Bell Park	40,930	80–72	Arizona Diamondbacks at San Francisco Giants Box Score, September 22, 2000
153	September 23	@ Giants	7–5	Guzman	Estes	Mantei (16)	Pacific Bell Park	40,930	81–72	Arizona Diamondbacks at San Francisco Giants Box Score, September 23, 2000
154	September 23	@ Giants	5–9	Del Toro	Reynoso	None	Pacific Bell Park	40,930	81–73	Arizona Diamondbacks at San Francisco Giants Box Score, September 23, 2000
155	September 24	@ Giants	8–3	Anderson	Hernandez	None	Pacific Bell Park	40,930	82–73	Arizona Diamondbacks at San Francisco Giants Box Score, September 24, 2000
156	September 25	@ Rockies	6–4	Johnson	Rose	Mantei (17)	Coors Field	37,131	83–73	Arizona Diamondbacks at Colorado Rockies Box Score, September 25, 2000
157	September 26	@ Rockies	6–7	Chouinard	Morgan	Jimenez (22)	Coors Field	35,703	83–74	Arizona Diamondbacks at Colorado Rockies Box Score, September 26, 2000
158	September 27	@ Rockies	4–6	White	Plesac	Jimenez (23)	Coors Field	36,519	83–75	Arizona Diamondbacks at Colorado Rockies Box Score, September 27, 2000
159	September 28	@ Rockies	12–3	Reynoso	Wasdin	None	Coors Field	36,659	84–75	Arizona Diamondbacks at Colorado Rockies Box Score, September 28, 2000
160	September 29	Giants	3–4	Hernandez	Anderson	Nen (41)	Bank One Ballpark	38,435	84–76	San Francisco Giants at Arizona Diamondbacks Box Score, September 29, 2000
161	September 30	Giants	5–1	Guzman	Embree	None	Bank One Ballpark	42,794	85–76	San Francisco Giants at Arizona Diamondbacks Box Score, September 30, 2000

October (0–1) (Home: 0–1; Road: 0–0)

#	Date	Opponent	Score	Win	Loss	Save	Stadium	Attendance	Record	Report
162	October 1	Giants	4–11	Ortiz	Johnson	Jimenez (23)	Bank One Ballpark	41,483	85–77	San Francisco Giants at Arizona Diamondbacks Box Score, October 1, 2000

=== Roster ===
2000 Arizona Diamondbacks
Roster
Pitchers: 34 Brian Anderson; 37 Omar Daal; 56 Nelson Figueroa; 50 Geraldo Guzmán; 46 Darren Holmes; 51 Randy Johnson; 49 Byung-hyun Kim; 31 Matt Mantei; 32 Mike Morgan; 45 Vicente Padilla; 19 Dan Plesac; 27 Armando Reynoso; 47 Johnny Ruffin; 38 Curt Schilling; 36 Russ Springer; 32 Todd Stottlemyre; 22 Greg Swindell	Catchers: 48 Rod Barajas; 26 Damian Miller; 35 Kelly Stinnett; Infielders: 33 Jay Bell; 38,39 Alex Cabrera; 28 Greg Colbrunn; 4 Craig Counsell; 44 Erubiel Durazo; 6 Andy Fox; 2 Hanley Frias; 29 Lenny Harris; 7 Danny Klassen; 9 Matt Williams; 5 Tony Womack	Outfielders: 29 Danny Bautista; 13 Jason Conti; 25 David Dellucci; 12 Steve Finley; 23 Bernard Gilkey; 20 Luis Gonzalez; 16 Travis Lee; 23 Matt Mieske; 15 Rob Ryan; 10 Turner Ward	Manager: 11 Buck Showalter; Coaches: 55 Brian Butterfield (3rd Base); 52 Mark Connor (Pitching); 21 Dwayne Murphy (1st Base); 17 Jim Presley (Hitting); 53 Glenn Sherlock (Bullpen); 14 Carlos Tosca (Bench)

== Player stats ==
=== Batting ===
Note: Pos = Position; G = Games played; AB = At bats; H = Hits; HR = Home runs; RBI = Runs batted in; Avg. = Batting average

Pos	Player	G	AB	H	HR	RBI	Avg.
C	Damian Miller	100	324	89	10	44	.275
1B	Greg Colbrunn	116	329	103	15	57	.313
2B	Jay Bell	149	565	151	18	68	.267
3B	Matt Williams	96	371	102	12	47	.275
SS	Tony Womack	146	617	167	7	57	.271
LF	Luis Gonzalez	162	618	192	31	114	.311
CF	Steve Finley	152	539	151	35	96	.280
RF	Danny Bautista	87	262	83	7	47	.317

==== Other batters ====
Note: G = Games played; AB = At bats; H = Hits; HR = Home runs; RBI = Runs batted in; Avg. = Batting average

Player	G	AB	H	HR	RBI	Avg.
Kelly Stinnett	76	240	52	8	33	.217
Travis Lee	72	224	52	8	40	.232
Erubiel Durazo	67	196	52	8	33	.265
Craig Counsell	67	152	48	2	11	.316
Hanley Frias	75	112	23	2	6	.205
Jason Conti	47	91	21	1	15	.231
Andy Fox	31	86	18	1	10	.209
Lenny Harris	36	85	16	1	13	.188
Alex Cabrera	31	80	21	5	14	.263
Danny Klassen	29	76	18	2	8	.237
Bernard Gilkey	38	73	8	2	6	.110
Turner Ward	15	52	9	0	4	.173
David Dellucci	34	50	15	0	2	.300
Rob Ryan	27	27	8	0	2	.296
Rod Barajas	5	13	3	1	3	.231
Matt Mieske	11	8	2	1	2	.250

=== Starting pitchers ===
Note: G = Games pitched; IP = Inning pitched; W = Wins; L = Losses; ERA = Earned run average; SO = Strikeouts

Player	G	IP	W	L	ERA	SO
Randy Johnson	35	248.2	19	7	2.64	347
Brian Anderson	33	213.1	11	7	4.05	104
Armando Reynoso	31	170.2	11	12	5.27	89
Curt Schilling	13	97.2	5	6	3.69	72
Omar Daal	20	96.0	2	10	7.22	45
Todd Stottlemyre	18	95.1	9	6	4.91	76
Geraldo Guzmán	13	60.1	5	4	5.23	52
Nelson Figueroa	3	15.2	0	1	7.47	7

==== Relief pitchers ====
Note: G = Games pitched; IP = Innings pitched; W = Wins; L = Losses; SV = Saves; ERA = Earned run average; SO = Strikeouts

Player	G	IP	W	L	SV	ERA	SO
Matt Mantei	47	45.1	1	1	17	4.57	53
Mike Morgan	60	101.2	5	5	5	4.87	56
Greg Swindell	64	76.0	2	6	1	3.20	64
Byung-Hyun Kim	61	70.2	6	6	14	4.46	111
Dan Plesac	62	40.0	5	1	0	3.15	45
Russ Springer	52	62.0	2	4	0	5.08	59
Vicente Padilla	27	35.0	2	1	0	2.31	30
Johnny Ruffin	5	9.0	0	0	0	9.00	5
Darren Holmes	8	6.1	0	0	1	8.53	5

== Farm system ==
Level	Team	League	Manager
AAA	Tucson Sidewinders	Pacific Coast League	Tom Spencer
AA	El Paso Diablos	Texas League	Bobby Dickerson
A	High Desert Mavericks	California League	Scott Coolbaugh
A	South Bend Silver Hawks	Midwest League	Dave Jorn
Rookie	AZL Diamondbacks	Arizona League	Joe Almaraz
Rookie	Missoula Osprey	Pioneer League	Chip Hale
