= Baton Rouge, Louisiana minor league baseball history =

Baton Rouge, Louisiana minor league baseball teams
- 1902–2003; (1902–1906, 1929–1934, 1946–1957, 1976, 2001–2003); Baton Rouge, Louisiana

Minor league affiliations
- Class: Class D (1902–1906, 1929–1934, 1946–1948); Class C (1949–1957); Class A (1976)
- League: Cotton States League (1902–1906, 1929–1932); Dixie League (1933); East Dixie League (1934); Evangeline League (1946–1957); Gulf States League (1976); All-American Association (2001); Southeastern League (2002–2003)

Major league affiliations
- Team: St. Louis Browns (1947); Philadelphia Phillies (1948)

Minor league titles
- League titles (5): 1903; 1932; 1934; 1950; 2003

Team data
- Name: Baton Rouge Cajuns (1902); Baton Rouge Red Sticks (1903–1904); Baton Rouge Cajuns (1905–1906); Baton Rouge Essos (1929); Baton Rouge Highlanders (1930); Baton Rouge Standards (1931); Baton Rouge Senators(1932); Baton Rouge Solons (1933); Baton Rouge Red Sticks (1934, 1946–1955); Baton Rouge Rebels (1956–1957); Baton Rouge Cougars (1976); Baton Rouge Blue Marlins (2001); Baton Rouge Riverbats (2002–2003)
- Ballpark: Battle Park (1902–1906); Standard Park (1929–1935); City Park (1934–1935, 1946–1955); Pete Goldsby Field (1956–1957, 1976); Alex Box Stadium (1976)

Minor league baseball teams were based in Baton Rouge, Louisiana in various seasons between 1902 and 2003. The Baton Rouge minor league teams played as members of the Cotton States League (1902–1906, 1929–1932), Dixie League (1933), East Dixie League (1934), Evangeline League (1946–1957), Gulf States League (1976), All-American Association (2001), and Southeastern League (2002–2003).

Baton Rouge teams played as a minor league affiliate of the St. Louis Browns in 1947 and Philadelphia Phillies in 1948.

== History ==
Minor league baseball began in Baton Rouge in 1902. The 1902 Baton Rouge Cajuns began play as charter members of the Class D level Cotton States League. In 1903, the team changed its moniker to the Baton Rouge "Red Sticks," a translation of the city's French name into English, and captured the 1903 Cotton League Championship.

On July 13, 1904, Red Sticks pitcher Hanlan threw a no-hitter against the Pine Bluff Lumbermen, winning 2–0 in six innings. In 1905–1906, the Cajuns' moniker reappeared as the team remained in the Cotton States League. On July 4, 1905, Baton Rouge pitcher Moxie Maxwell pitched a no-hitter in a 2–1 loss to the Vicksburg Hill Climbers. Another no-hitter was thrown on August 5, 1906, when Jimmy Laird no-hit the Jackson Senators in a 3–0 Baton Rough victory. A few weeks later, on August 28, 1906, Bernie McCay threw a no-hitter while defeating the Vicksburg Hill Climbers 3–0.

For the franchise, finances were of such a concern that in 1905, the team used certain games as "fundraising games" and charged an inflated $2.00 per ticket in an attempt to increase funding to keep the team in business

Visiting teams stayed at the Istrouma Hotel in Baton Rouge. In the era, the hotel was located on the corner of Third Street and Florida Street.

After a 23-season hiatus, Baton Rouge rejoined the Cotton States League when the Hattiesburg Pinetoppers relocated from Hattiesburg, Mississippi to Baton Rouge on May 30, 1929, playing as the Baton Rouge Essos for the remainder of the 1929 season. On July 19, 1929, Essos pitcher Clyde Freeman threw a perfect game in a 7-inning game against the Lake Charles Newporters, a 4–0 Baton Rouge victory. The Baton Rouge Highlanders (1930), Baton Rouge Standards (1931) and Baton Rouge Senators (1932) continued play in the Cotton States League. The Senators were in first place with a 51–20 record when the Cotton States folded On July 13, 1932, as minor league baseball struggled financially during the Great Depression.

In 1933, Baton Rouge joined the reformed Dixie League. The Baton Rouge Solons continued play and retained manager Josh Billings and several players from the previous season. The Solons finished the season with a 77–47 record and captured the Dixie League championship.

Baton Rouge remained as the Dixie League split into two halves in 1934, with the Baton Rouge Red Sticks playing in the East Dixie League. Struggling, the franchise moved to Clarksdale, Mississippi on June 11, 1935, and continued play as the Clarksdale Ginners.

Baton Rouge remained without a team until 1946, when the Baton Rouge Red Sticks became a charter member of the revived Evangeline League. Baton Rouge would remain as a stable franchise in the Evangeline League, playing as the Red Sticks from 1946 to 1955 and the Baton Rouge Rebels in 1956 and 1957. In 1950, the Red Sticks finished 82–58 and won the 1950 Evangeline League Championship and went on to make the playoffs in four of the next five seasons. On June 20, 1957, the Baton Rouge Rebels and Lafayette Oilers both folded. The Rebels were 24–35 at the time.

The Evangeline League permanently folded following the 1957 season and had never become an integrated league, despite the efforts of major league affiliates (the Chicago Cubs) to assign players to the Lafayette Oilers and integrate team rosters. Lafayette was an affiliate of the Chicago Cubs. In 1956, some boycotts of attending games occurred after the Lafayette Oilers refused to accept the players' teams and Lafayette Parrish, home of the Baton Rouge Rebels, passed legislation making it illegal for black players to play in its ballparks. The Evangeline League itself also officially banned non-white players from appearing on their rosters. These blocks forced the major league teams to reassign the players to other leagues. Due to boycotts, the 1956 playoff finals, featuring Lafayette, were cancelled as a result. Both the Lafayette Oilers and the Baton Rouge Rebels folded before the end of the 1957 season, on June 20, 1957.

In 1946, John Radulovich hit .409, playing for the Baton Rouge Red Sticks, becoming the first player in Evangeline League history to hit over .400. Radulovich had 215 hits, with 41 doubles and 31 home runs.

In 1976, minor-league baseball returned when the Baton Rouge Cougars became a charter member of the reformed Class A level Gulf States League. However, the league and its franchises struggled, with Baton Rouge folding on August 13, 1976, with a record of 43–27. The Cougars' owner, Billy Blythe had vanished, and player paychecks stopped arriving. Louisiana State University was forced to evict the ball club from Alex Box Stadium. The Gulf States League folded after the 1976 season. This would be Baton Rouge's last appearance in affiliated minor league baseball.

After a 25-year absence of minor league baseball, the 2001 Baton Rouge Blue Marlins played as members of the independent level All-American Association and the Baton Rouge Riverbats of 2002 and 2003 played in the independent Southeastern League. The Blue Marlins captured the All-American Association Championship after also having the best regular season record of 44–28. The All-American Association folded after the 2001 season and the newly formed Southeastern League convinced the Baton Rouge Blue Marlins to join them in 2002. The renamed Riverbats finished with records of 39–29 and 38–31 in their two seasons, capturing the 2003 Southeastern League Championship. The Southeastern League folded following the 2003 season.

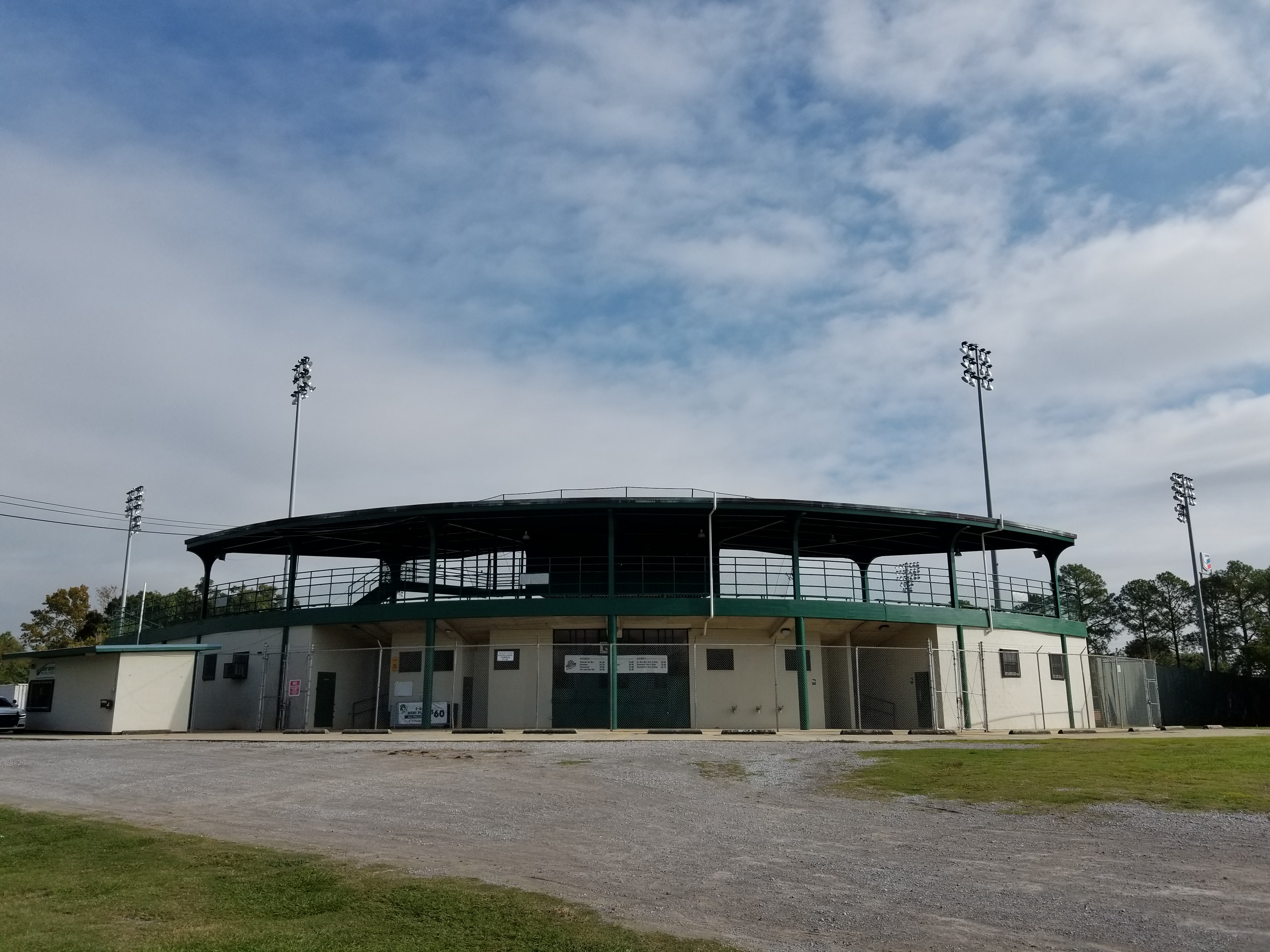
Pete Goldsby Field (Baton Rouge, Louisiana)

== The ballparks ==
Early Baton Rouge teams, the Cajuns and Red Sticks played at Battle Park. Built in 1902, Battle Park was located four blocks south of Magnolia Cemetery. In 1903, the St. Louis Browns utilized Battle Park for their spring training.

When minor league baseball returned to Baton Rouge in 1929, the teams played at Standard Park, which was owned by the Standard Oil Company. The ballpark had been damaged by fire on February 22, 1929, and the rebuilt grandstands collapsed on opening day, 1929, with no injuries. The teams continued play at Standard Park, sharing it with City Park in 1934–1935.

In 1934 and 1935 and from 1946 to 1955, Baton Rouge minor league teams hosted minor league games at City Park. The ballpark was located at 1055 Convention Street, where there was limited parking. City Park had a capacity of 3,500.

Beginning in 1936, Baton Rouge minor league teams played home games at Pete Goldsby Field (1956–1957, 1976, 2000–2003) through 2003. The ballpark is named for a local businessman who had been active in youth baseball and activities. The ballpark is still in use today and is located at 1502 Foss Street in Baton Rouge. It has a current capacity of 2,000, and held 3,500 in 1956. Its dimensions are: LF 325 - CF 395 - RF 345. It currently is the home of the Baton Rouge Rougaru of the summer Texas Collegiate League.

The 1976 Baton Rouge Cougars played at Alex Box Stadium. The Cougars left the ballpark upon being evicted after owner Billy Blythe disappeared and the ball club stopped making payroll and rent payments.

== Notable alumni ==
- Bill Atwood (1932)
- Josh Billings (1932–1934, MGR)
- Mel Clark (1948)
- Leon Culberson (1950)
- Chuck Cottier (1956)
- Slow Joe Doyle (1903–1904)
- Terry Leach (1976)
- Slim Love (1930)
- Tommy McMillan (1906)
- Dee Miles (1934)
- Mel Mazzera (1933)
- George Myatt (1933)
- Harry Niles (1905)

== See also ==
- Baton Rouge Red Sticks players
- Baton Rouge Cajuns players
- Baton Rouge Cougars players
- Baton Rouge Essos players
- Baton Rouge Highlanders players
- Baton Rouge Rebels players
- Baton Rouge Senators players
- Baton Rouge Solons players.

== Media ==
- Bielawa, Michael; Bielawa, Janice (2007). Baseball in Baton Rouge. Arcadia Publishing. ISBN 0738542237.
