= Rick Greene =

American baseball player (born 1971)

- Relief pitcher
- Born: January 2, 1971 (age 55); Fort Knox, Kentucky, U.S.
- Batted: Right Threw: Right

MLB debut
- June 19, 1999, for the Cincinnati Reds

Last MLB appearance
- June 19, 1999, for the Cincinnati Reds

MLB statistics
- Record: 0-0
- Earned run average: 4.76
- Strikeouts: 3
- Stats at Baseball Reference

Teams
- Cincinnati Reds (1999)

Richard Douglas Greene Jr. (born January 2, 1971) is an American former right-handed Major League Baseball relief pitcher who appeared in one game for the Cincinnati Reds in 1999. He was listed as 6'5" and 200 pounds.

== Amateur career ==
Prior to playing professional baseball, Greene attended Coral Gables Senior High School and then Louisiana State University. In 1990, he played collegiate summer baseball with the Brewster Whitecaps of the Cape Cod Baseball League. He helped lead LSU to victory in the 1991 College World Series.

Originally drafted by the New York Yankees in the 14th round of the 1989 draft, Greene chose not to sign. However, when he was chosen 16th overall in the 1992 draft by the Detroit Tigers, he did sign.

== Professional playing career ==
He competed in the 1992 Barcelona Olympics, so he did not play professionally that year. He began his professional career in 1993, splitting time between the Lakeland Tigers and London Tigers. In a combined 49 relief appearances, he went 4–5 with a 6.33 ERA. In 1993, he was ranked the sixth best prospect in the Tigers organization by Baseball America. In 1994, he split the season between the Lakeland Tigers and Trenton Thunder, going 1–5 with a 5.64 ERA in 39 games. That year, he started the only two games of his professional career and he was ranked the fifth best prospect in the Tigers organization by Baseball America. He also earned the first save in Trenton Thunder history that season. He showed a marked improvement in 1995 while pitching for the Jacksonville Suns. For them he went 6–2 with a 3.49 ERA in 32 appearances. He again pitched for the Suns in 1996, going 2–7 with 30 saves and a 4.98 ERA in 57 appearances and earning an All Star berth. In 1997, he played for the Toledo Mud Hens, going 6–8 with a 2.83 ERA in 57 games. On November 20, 1997, he was traded with Mike Myers and Santiago Perez to the Milwaukee Brewers for Bryce Florie and cash.

Greene spent only one season in the Brewers farm system - 1998. Pitching for the Louisville Redbirds, he went 6–6 with a 3.51 ERA and 18 saves in 58 games. He was granted free agency on October 15.

Signed by the Reds on February 9, 1999, Greene went 5–7 with a 3.69 ERA in 61 appearances for their Triple-A minor league affiliate the Indianapolis Indians. He made his lone big league appearance on June 19 of that year, against the Milwaukee Brewers. Coming to relieve for Ron Villone (who lasted only 1/3 of an inning because he gave up six earned runs), Greene pitched 5 2/3 innings, allowing seven hits, four runs and three earned runs while walking one batter and striking out two. He gave up a home run to the first batter he ever faced, José Valentín and his ERA for the game was 4.76.

Granted free agency on October 10, 1999, Greene was signed by the Minnesota Twins and began the 2000 season with the Salt Lake Buzz. For them he went 2–2 with a 5.81 ERA in 22 appearances. He then wound up in the Reds organization again, appearing in 32 games for the Louisville RiverBats, going 4–4 with a 2.82 ERA in 32 games. Overall, he went 6–6 with a 4.04 ERA.

He wrapped up his professional career in 2001, pitching for the Baton Rouge Blue Marlins of the All-American Association. An All-Star, he led the league that year with 21 saves.

In 2014, Rick Greene was Southern University's baseball pitching coach in Baton Rouge, LA for head coach Roger Cador.

== Post-baseball activities ==
Greene started the 2 Seam Dream charitable foundation in 2012 after both his father and step-father were diagnosed with cancer. The 2 Seam Dream Foundation raises awareness for cancer research and supports healthy living and patient recovery.

== Bibliography ==
- Baseball Reference
- The Baseball Cube
