= Loel =

Loel is a masculine given name and surname. Notable people with this name include:

== Given name ==
- Loel D. Frederickson (1919–2009), American football, basketball, and baseball coach
- Loel Guinness, OBE (1906–1988), British Conservative politician and member of parliament
- Loel Passe (1917–1997), American sports broadcaster
- Frank Loel Sweetser (1873–1953), American pioneer management consultant and organizational theorist

== Surname ==
- Bertie Loel (1878–1957), Australian rules footballer
- Guy Loel (born 1971), Israeli actor

== See also ==
- Loel E. Bennett Stadium, stadium in Winchester, Tennessee
