= Santiago Pérez (baseball) =

Dominican baseball player

- Utility player
- Born: December 30, 1975 (age 50); Santo Domingo, Dominican Republic
- Batted: Both Threw: Right

MLB debut
- June 3, 2000, for the Milwaukee Brewers

Last MLB appearance
- July 1, 2001, for the San Diego Padres

MLB statistics
- Batting average: .188
- Home runs: 0
- RBI: 6
- Stats at Baseball Reference

Teams
- Milwaukee Brewers (2000); San Diego Padres (2001)

Santiago Alberto Pérez (born December 30, 1975) is a Dominican former utility player in Major League Baseball. Pérez was a switch-hitter and threw right-handed. He attended Liceo Victor Estrella High School in Santo Domingo.

== Career ==
Originally signed by the Detroit Tigers in 1993 as an undrafted free agent, Pérez never got higher than High-A ball in their organization, although he did display good speed, stealing 17 or more bases three times in the five seasons he was in the Tigers' organization.

On November 20, 1997, Pérez was traded by Detroit along with Rick Greene and Mike Myers to the Milwaukee Brewers in exchange for Bryce Florie. Pérez started off in Double-A baseball in 1998, but by the end of the season he had seen some time in Triple-A. He remained at the Triple-A level until June 3, 2000, which is when he made his big league debut at the age of 24. He went 0-for-2 in his first game, and he started his career off collecting only two hits in his first 11 at-bats. He collected his first hit off of Valerio de los Santos. His season would not improve much after his poor start, in fact, it would basically stay the same. He ended up hitting .173 in the 52 at-bats that made up his first season. He was however 100% successful in the stolen base category, stealing four bases in four attempts.

In the 2000–2001 offseason, the Brewers sent Pérez with a player to be named later to the San Diego Padres for Brandon Kolb and a player to be named later. The two players to be named would end up being Will Cunnane from the Padres and minor leaguer Chad Green from the Brewers.

Although Pérez was with a new team, his luck did not improve much. He played 43 games with the Padres in 2001, coming to the plate 81 times. Overall, he collected 16 hits for a .198 batting average in 2001-a slight improvement over the previous season, but still a poor average. July 1, 2001, would end up being Pérez's last game in the majors. He collected a walk in his only plate appearance in that game.

Although his big league career was over, his professional career was not. In fact, he was bouncing around the minor leagues as recently as 2005, and in 28 games with Double-A Frisco in 2004, he hit .387.

His career batting statistics were not stellar, as he hit .188 with no home runs and six RBI in 133 career at-bats. Yet he was still a valuable asset due to his defensive versatility. Not only did he play in all three outfield spots in his career, he also spent time at shortstop and second base. His career fielding percentage was .926.

He wore two numbers in his career, 1 and 57.
