= Falcon Field =

Falcon Field may refer to:

- Falcon Field (Arizona), an airport in Mesa, Arizona, United States
- Falcon Field (Georgia), an airport in Peachtree City, Georgia, United States
- Falcon Field (Corinth, Texas), a baseball field
- Falcon Baseball Field, in Colorado Springs, Colorado
