= Chad Green (outfielder) =

American baseball player (born 1975)

- Outfielder
- Born: June 28, 1975 (age 50); Dunkirk, New York, U.S.
Medals
Representing United States
Men's baseball
Summer Olympics
Bronze medal – third place	1996 Atlanta	Team

Chad Elton Green (born June 28, 1975) is an American former switch-hitting, right-handed minor league baseball outfielder.

== Amateur career ==
Green attended Mentor High School and then the University of Kentucky. Originally drafted by the Kansas City Royals in the ninth round of the 1993 draft, Green opted not to sign. In 1995, he played collegiate summer baseball with the Yarmouth–Dennis Red Sox of the Cape Cod Baseball League. He competed for the United States in the 1996 Olympics, helping the U.S. win the bronze medal. Shortly thereafter, Green was drafted eighth overall by the Milwaukee Brewers.

== Professional career ==
He started his professional career that season, batting .358 in 21 games with the Ogden Raptors. He also showed good speed, stealing 12 bases.

Standing at 5'10", 180 pounds, Green's 1997 season was not very successful. Playing for the High-A Stockton Ports, Green hit only .250 in 127 games. In 513 at-bats, he struck out 138 times and walked only 37 times. He did steal what would be a career high 37 bases that season. Even though he did not do too well in 1997, he was still considered the 99th best prospect by Baseball America.

He started with Stockton in 1998, hitting .344 with 22 steals in 40 games. He was promoted to the Double-A El Paso Diablos, where he played seven games and did not collect a single hit in six at-bats.

Like his 1997 season, his 1999 season was unimpressive. In 116 games with class the Double-A Huntsville Stars, he hit only .246 with 109 strikeouts in 422 at-bats. He did steal 28 bases and hit a career-high 10 home runs.

2000 was the worst season thus far in his career. While with Huntsville, he hit only .233 in 85 games, stealing 19 bases. Still, he managed to make it to Triple-A, spending 43 games with the Indianapolis Indians. He hit only .203 with them.

In the 2000/2001 offseason, Green was traded with Santiago Perez to the San Diego Padres for Will Cunnane and Brandon Kolb.

He started 2001 in the Padres organization, but after hitting only .226 with the Double-A Mobile BayBears and .224 with the Portland Sea Dogs, he was released on July 4 of that year. He was signed by the Cleveland Indians on July 21, and played the rest of his season with the Double-A Akron Aeros. He hit .260 in 37 games with them.

After the 2001 season, he was granted free agency and signed with the Minnesota Twins before the 2002 season. 2002 saw flashes of the Chad Green of old-while with the New Britain Rock Cats, he hit .329 in 20 games. Upon his promotion to the Triple-A Edmonton Trappers, he had an 18-game hitting streak going, but he hit only .218 with them.

He spent all of 2003 with the Rochester Red Wings, hitting .252 in 106 games. His 12 stolen bases were nothing near what he used to be able to steal. After the 2003 season, he was granted free agency.

He did not play professional baseball in 2004. He was signed by the Florida Marlins in November 2004, but only played one game in their organization in 2005. He was used as a pinch runner in a game for the Double-A Carolina Mudcats.
