= Mike Myers (baseball) =

American baseball player (born 1969)

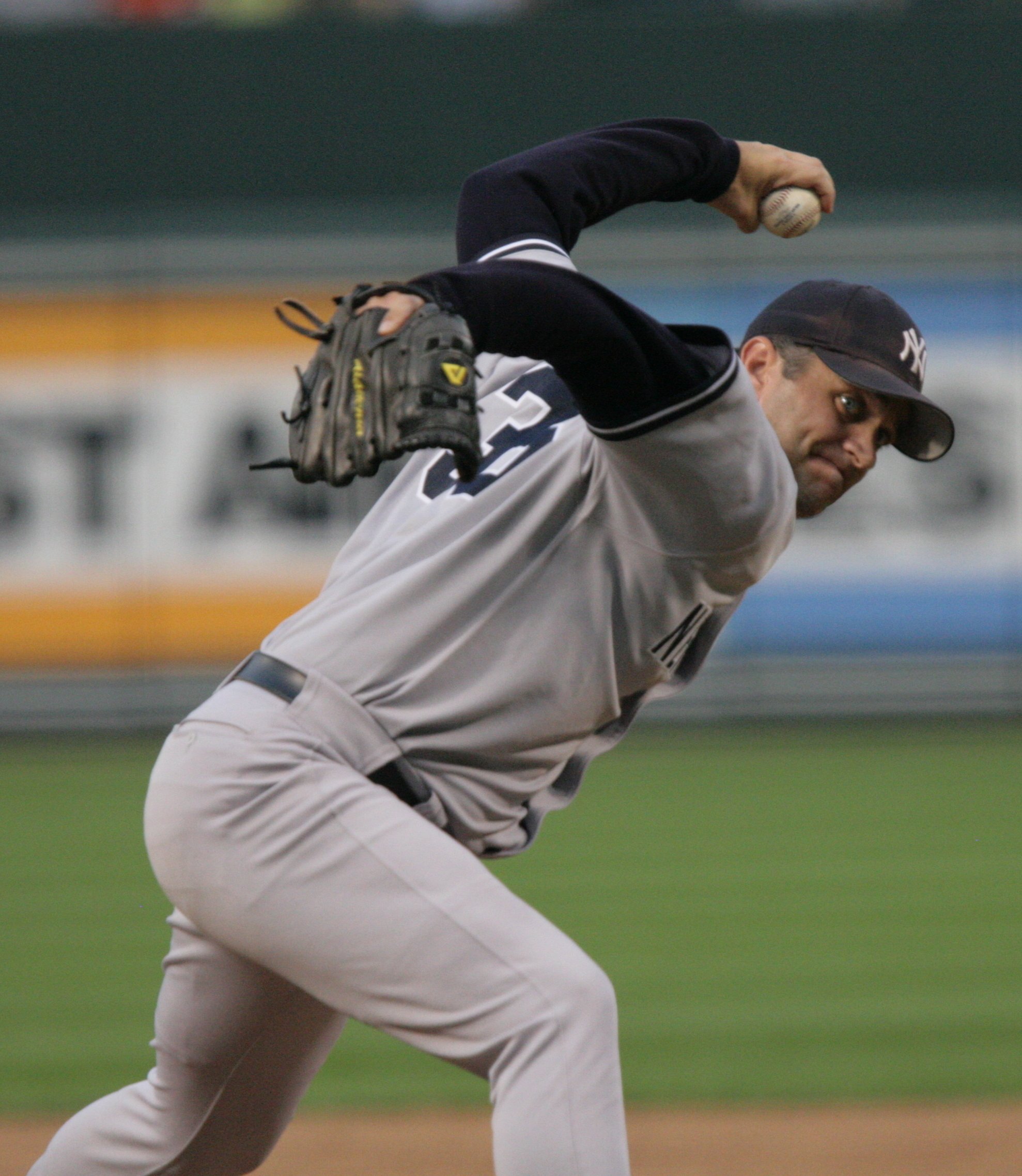
- Myers with the New York Yankees in 2006
- Pitcher
- Born: June 26, 1969 (age 56); Arlington Heights, Illinois, U.S.
- Batted: Left Threw: Left

MLB debut
- April 25, 1995, for the Florida Marlins

Last MLB appearance
- September 30, 2007, for the Chicago White Sox

MLB statistics
- Win–loss record: 25–24
- Earned run average: 4.29
- Strikeouts: 429
- Stats at Baseball Reference

Teams
- Florida Marlins (1995); Detroit Tigers (1995–1997); Milwaukee Brewers (1998–1999); Colorado Rockies (2000–2001); Arizona Diamondbacks (2002–2003); Seattle Mariners (2004); Boston Red Sox (2004–2005); New York Yankees (2006–2007); Chicago White Sox (2007)

Career highlights and awards
- World Series champion (2004)

Michael Stanley Myers (born June 26, 1969) is an American former professional left-handed relief pitcher who played in Major League Baseball (MLB) from 1995 to 2007.

== High school and college ==
Myers attended high school at Crystal Lake Central High School in Illinois and later attended Iowa State University, where he played college baseball for the Iowa State Cyclones baseball team. In the summers of 1988 and 1989, he pitched for the Brewster Whitecaps of the Cape Cod Baseball League and was named a league all-star in 1989.

== Minor league career ==
Myers was in the minor leagues for parts of six seasons. In his final four minor league seasons, he was 14–27 with a 4.29 ERA. He was used primarily as a starting pitcher until 1995, when he pitched 42 games, all in relief, for the Charlotte Knights and Toledo Mud Hens.

== Professional career ==
The San Francisco Giants drafted Myers in the fourth round of the 1990 Major League Baseball draft. Before he ever played for the Giants at the major league level, he was drafted by the Florida Marlins in the 1992 Rule 5 draft. He made his major league debut with the Marlins on April 25, 1995, pitching an inning of scoreless relief. In August of that year, the Marlins traded Myers to the Detroit Tigers as the player to be named later from an earlier deal between the two clubs, in which the Marlins acquired Buddy Groom.

He went a combined 1–9 for Detroit between the 1996 and 1997 seasons. He did lead the Majors in appearances, appearing in 83 and 88 games respectively in both seasons. Myers pitched for Detroit through the 1997 season. After the season, Myers was traded by the Tigers with Rick Greene and Santiago Perez to the Milwaukee Brewers for Bryce Florie.

Myers pitched for the Brewers for two seasons, pitching in 70 games in 1998 and 71 in 1999. After the 1999 season, the Brewers traded Myers to the Colorado Rockies for Curt Leskanic.

In 2000, Myers had the best season of his career while pitching half his games in Coors Field. He had a 2.05 ERA in 43 games at Coors Field in 2000. He finished the season with a career low 1.99 ERA in 78 games. The following season, Myers pitched in 73 games for the Rockies, going 2–3 with a 3.60 ERA.

Before the 2002 season, the Rockies traded Myers to the Arizona Diamondbacks for JD Closser and Jack Cust. In 2002, he had a 4.38 ERA in 69 games while in 2003 he had a 5.70 ERA in 64 games.

He signed as a free agent with the Seattle Mariners for the 2004 season, but was selected off of waivers by the Boston Red Sox in August 2004. He signed as a free agent with the St. Louis Cardinals in the 2004–05 offseason, but was traded back to the Red Sox for two minor league players before the 2005 season began.

During the 2005–06 offseason, Myers signed as a free agent with the New York Yankees. He got off to an amazing start in 2006, with an ERA under 2.00 by mid July. But he then struggled down the stretch. One big highlight late in the season was the big outs he got in Boston during a five-game series against the Red Sox. The Yankees released Myers in August 2007, and he signed with the Chicago White Sox.

On January 25, 2008, Myers signed with the Los Angeles Dodgers to a minor league contract and was invited to spring training. Myers did not make the Dodgers team, but was assigned to play for the Las Vegas 51s in Triple-A. He asked for his release from the 51s on April 25 and became a free agent.

On March 17, 2009, Myers was hired as a special assistant to the head of the Major League Baseball Players Association, Donald Fehr.

== Pitching style ==
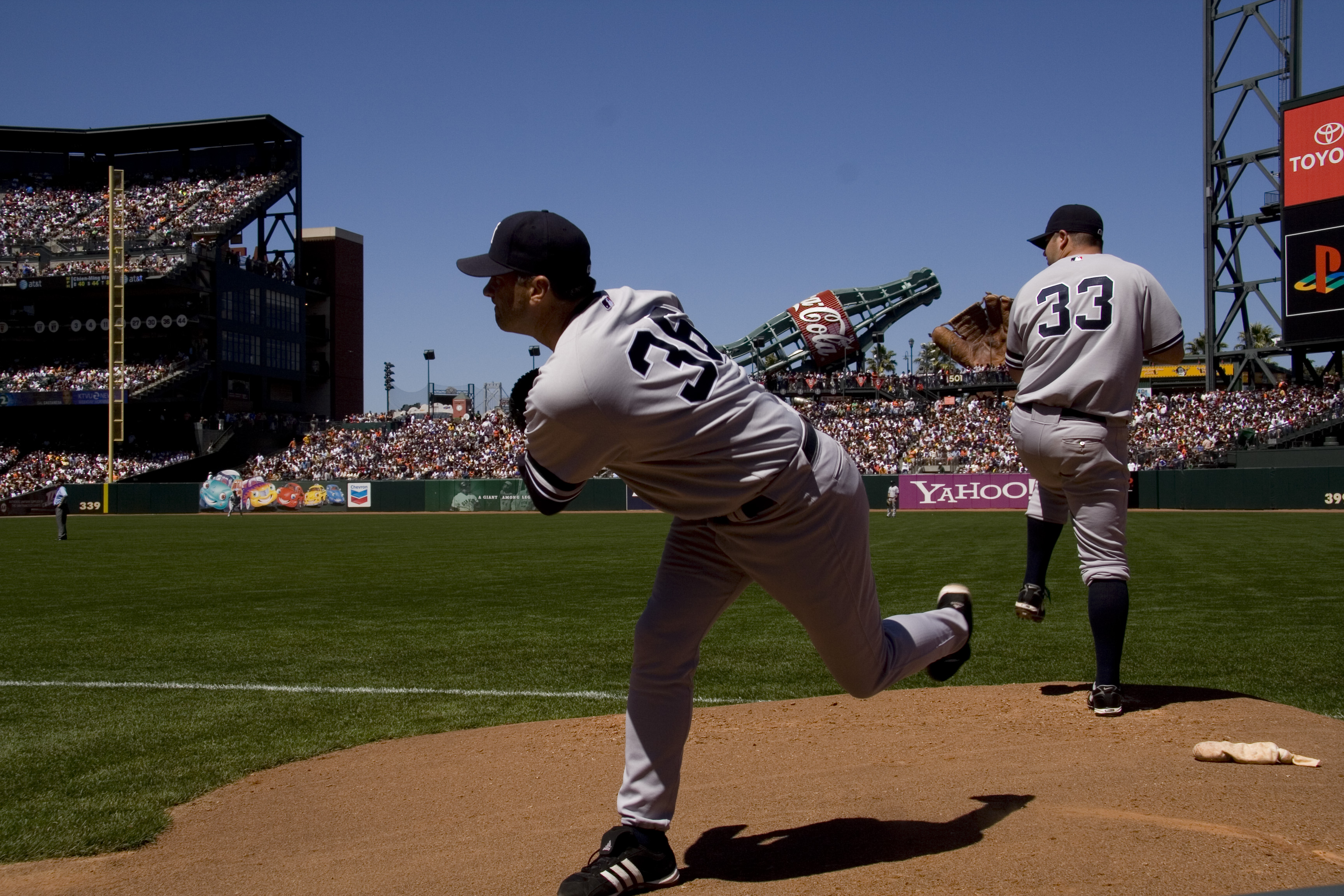
Myers (left) and Brian Bruney (right) warm up in the bullpen.

Myers is a submarine pitcher, throwing the ball with his arm at or below his shoulder rather than above. When Myers was with the Tigers, Baseball Hall of Famer Al Kaline, then a broadcaster with the team, suggested that Myers experiment with the submarine style of pitching. His luck improved in his next two appearances against Baltimore, retiring three batters in a row both times. "Kaline suggested my throwing sidearm to give me a little bit of funk and mystery against left-handed hitters. After what I did against Baltimore, I just kept going from there," Myers said. He threw two different breaking balls with a deceptive movement that disconcerted opposing hitters, especially left-handed hitters. Myers was also known to be particularly durable. From his first full major league season in 1996, he appeared in at least 60 games every year, topping 80 appearances in his first two seasons to lead the league both years, and over 70 in his next four seasons.

Myers's primary role was as a left-handed relief specialist (known in the sport as a "LOOGY, or "Lefty One-Out GuY"), against baseball's left-handed hitters, though the statistics say he may have had difficulty performing his job against the top left-handed hitters of his era. With the Rockies and Diamondbacks, he would frequently come into games to face Giants slugger Barry Bonds, and was similarly used by the Red Sox against Hideki Matsui of the Yankees and by the Yankees against David Ortiz of the Red Sox. However, through the end of the 2007 season, Bonds was 8-for-25 (.320) with a home run and eight walks against Myers, while Ortiz was 5-for-17 (.294) with a home run and two walks, and Matsui was 3-for-9 (.333) with a home run and a walk.

== Personal life ==
Myers became an evangelical Christian in 1993.
