= Todd Van Poppel =

American baseball player (born 1971)

- Pitcher
- Born: December 9, 1971 (age 54); Hinsdale, Illinois, U.S.
- Batted: Right Threw: Right

MLB debut
- September 11, 1991, for the Oakland Athletics

Last MLB appearance
- October 2, 2004, for the Cincinnati Reds

MLB statistics
- Win–loss record: 40–52
- Earned run average: 5.58
- Strikeouts: 711
- Stats at Baseball Reference

Teams
- Oakland Athletics (1991, 1993–1996); Detroit Tigers (1996); Texas Rangers (1998); Pittsburgh Pirates (1998); Chicago Cubs (2000–2001); Texas Rangers (2002–2003); Cincinnati Reds (2003–2004)

Todd Matthew Van Poppel (born December 9, 1971) is an American former Major League Baseball pitcher who played for the Oakland Athletics (1991, 1993–1996), Detroit Tigers (1996), Texas Rangers (1998, 2002–2003), Pittsburgh Pirates (1998), Chicago Cubs (2000–2001), and Cincinnati Reds (2003–2004). He retired during spring training with the New York Mets in 2005.

== Amateur career ==
Van Poppel was 11–3 with a 0.97 earned run average (ERA) and 170 strikeouts as a senior at Martin High School in Arlington, Texas. He was drafted in the first round, 14th overall, by the Athletics directly out of high school in the 1990 Major League Baseball draft. The Atlanta Braves had seriously considered using the first overall selection on Van Poppel. However, when Van Poppel explicitly told the Braves he would not sign with them, the team opted instead to take future Hall of Fame player Chipper Jones.

== Professional career ==
Van Poppel was the first of four starting pitchers selected by the A's in the first 36 picks of the 1990 draft, referred to at the time as "The Four Aces". The other three draftees were Don Peters, Dave Zancanaro and Kirk Dressendorfer. All four struggled with injuries after being drafted, and only Van Poppel and Dressendorfer ever reached the major leagues.

Because Van Poppel was signed to a major league contract rather than the standard minor league contract, the A's only had a limited number of minor league options they could use on him. By all accounts, his lack of seasoning in the minors cost both the A's and Van Poppel. He pitched just 37.2 innings in Single-A in 1990, spent 1991 at Double-A Huntsville, and was hurt for much of 1992 at Triple-A Tacoma before splitting time between Oakland and Tacoma in 1993. In all, he made only 32 minor league starts.

Armed with a blazing fastball that had little movement, Van Poppel struggled with the A's. His best season in Oakland was probably 1995, when he went 4–8 with a 4.88 ERA, splitting time as a starter and a reliever. He also notched 122 strikeouts (and 56 walks) in 138.1 innings that year.

In 1996, his numbers dropped sharply, and he was released by the A's mid-season. After unremarkable stops in Detroit, Texas and Pittsburgh, Van Poppel did have two successful years (2000 and 2001) as a middle reliever with the Cubs, before his effectiveness declined.

Van Poppel's career record was 40–52. He never won more than seven games in a season.

== Retirement ==
Shortly after his retirement from baseball in 2005, Van Poppel announced he was investing in the Denton Outlaws, a Texas Collegiate League team. The Outlaws went on to win the league championship that year.

== Personal life ==
Van Poppel's son, Riley Van Poppel, is a defensive lineman for the University of Nebraska Cornhuskers football team.

Van Poppel's daughter, Halee, has played volleyball for Dallas Baptist University and his son, Tate, has played baseball for Midland College.
