= San Antonio River Monsters =

Collegiate summer baseball team in Texas

Information
- League: Texas Collegiate League
- Location: San Antonio, Texas
- Ballpark: Sullivan Field
- Founded: 2022
- Nickname: 'Sters
- League championships: 2023
- Colors: Navy and Green
- Mascot: Gill
- Website: www.rivermonstersbaseball.com

The San Antonio River Monsters are a collegiate summer baseball team based in San Antonio, Texas. The team is a member of the Texas Collegiate League (TCL) and plays its home games at Sullivan Field at the University of the Incarnate Word. Before relocating to San Antonio, the River Monsters played their home games at Smokey Joe Williams Field in Seguin, named after Hall of Famer Smokey Joe Williams. The Team was founded in 2022 by Mike Gigliotti and Scott Barry.

The River Monsters won the TCL championship in 2023 when they defeated the Brazos Valley Bombers in the championship game 3–1.

Upon completion of the 2023 season, the River Monsters were acquired by Tommy & Kristin Stephens.

In 2026, the team officially announced it would relocate to San Antonio for the 2026 season.

== Team Record ==
River Monsters Baseball	Wins	Losses	Result
2022	10	33	
2023	22	28	Texas Collegiate League Champions
2024	12	33	
2025	14	30	
2026	24	18	

== All-TCL Award Nominations ==
2022: Jose Gutierrez, DH, 1B; Caleb Vuono, LHP; Evan Maldonado, RHP; Evans Hendricks, LHP
2023: Ruger Riojas, RHP; Logan Stockton, DH; Damien Rodriguez, 3B; Xavier Arias, OF; Garrett Felix, OF
2024: Patrick McLellan, 2B
2025: Eric Bacon, OF
2026: Eric Bacon, OF

== Notable alumni ==
- Ruger Riojas, part of the 2023 TCL Championship Seguin River Monsters, was selected by the Philadelphia Phillies with the 100th overall pick in the 2026 MLB Draft.
- Reid Hensley, part of the 2022 Seguin River Monsters, went on to win a National Championship with the 2026 Oklahoma Sooners baseball team
