= Falcon Field (Corinth, Texas) =

Baseball field in Corinth, Texas, US

Coordinates: 33.13513°N 97.05793°W

Falcon Field is a baseball field in Corinth, Texas, US. It was the 2007 home of the defunct Denton Outlaws of the Texas Collegiate League. The field is now home to the Falcons of Lake Dallas High School.
