= Byung-hyun Kim =

South Korean baseball player (born 1979)

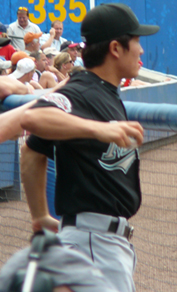
- Kim with the Florida Marlins in 2007
- Pitcher
- Born: January 19, 1979 (age 47); Gwangju, South Korea
- Batted: Right Threw: Right

Professional debut
- MLB: May 29, 1999, for the Arizona Diamondbacks
- NPB: 2011, for the Tohoku Rakuten Golden Eagles
- KBO: May 8, 2012, for the Nexen Heroes

Last appearance
- MLB: September 28, 2007, for the Florida Marlins
- NPB: 2011, for the Tohoku Rakuten Golden Eagles
- KBO: October 6, 2015, for the Kia Tigers

MLB statistics
- Win–loss record: 54–60
- Earned run average: 4.42
- Strikeouts: 806
- Saves: 86

NPB statistics
- Win–loss record: 0–1
- Earned run average: 2.66
- Strikeouts: 18

KBO statistics
- Win–loss record: 11–23
- Earned run average: 6.19
- Strikeouts: 190
- Stats at Baseball Reference

Teams
- Arizona Diamondbacks (1999–2003); Boston Red Sox (2003–2004); Colorado Rockies (2005–2007); Florida Marlins (2007); Arizona Diamondbacks (2007); Florida Marlins (2007); Tohoku Rakuten Golden Eagles (2011); Nexen Heroes (2012–2013); Kia Tigers (2014–2015)

Career highlights and awards
- All-Star (2002); World Series champion (2001)
Korean name
Hangul	김병현
Hanja	金炳賢
RR	Gim Byeonghyeon
MR	Kim Pyŏnghyŏn
IPA	[kimbjʌŋçʌn] or [kim] [pjʌŋçʌn]

Byung-hyun Kim (Korean: 김병현; born January 19, 1979), also known as BK Kim, is a South Korean former professional baseball pitcher. He had his most successful years with the Arizona Diamondbacks and the Boston Red Sox.

Kim is best remembered for his role in the 2001 World Series, in which he gave up consecutive ninth-inning leads in both Game 4 and Game 5, taking the loss in Game 4. He went on to save 36 games for the Diamondbacks in 2002 and 16 for the Red Sox in 2003, and played in the 2002 All Star Game. He is the first Korean player to win a World Series.

== Early career ==
Kim is a 1997 graduate of Gwangju Jeil High School. Jae Seo and Hee-seop Choi were Kim's teammates in 1996 and they are very close friends. Named both the Most Valuable Player and Most Valuable Pitcher for the National High School championships in South Korea, Kim was selected to the 1996 National Junior Team, then named to the National Team in both 1997 and 1998. In that year, he pitched against the US Olympic team, striking out 15 batters in 6 2/3 innings. Later, he helped Korea claim the gold medal in the Asian Games held in Bangkok, Thailand. Kim attended Sungkyunkwan University's Faculty of Law until 1999.

== Professional career ==
=== 1999 season ===
Kim was signed by the Arizona Diamondbacks on February 19, 1999. Kim went 2–0 with 32 strikeouts in 21.1 innings in El Paso (AA) and then went to Tucson Sidewinders (AAA), where he posted 2–0 with 21 strikeouts in 17.1 innings. His ability to strike out batters caught the attention of Diamondbacks coaching staff. He was the youngest player in MLB at the time he debuted on May 29 at Shea Stadium. He came in to pitch in the bottom of the ninth inning, and after retiring Edgardo Alfonzo and John Olerud, struck out Mike Piazza and got the save in the Diamondbacks' 8–7 victory over the New York Mets.

On June 9, 1999, during a game against the Chicago Cubs, a bandage covered in a foreign substance fell from Kim's sleeve after a pitch. He was immediately ejected by umpire Ed Montague for possessing the illegal item but was not disciplined further.

=== 2000 season ===
In the 2000 season, Kim got the closer role when incumbent Matt Mantei opened the season on the disabled list. For the year, Kim struck out 111 hitters in just 70.2 innings pitched (14.14 per nine innings), including 11 out of 12 batters over five games, and twice struck out eight consecutive batters. After his 14 saves and a 1.82 ERA over his first 28 appearances, he was demoted to Triple-A Tucson at the end of July. Mostly used as a starter to restore his confidence, Kim returned to Arizona a month later. With Mantei reinserted as the closer, Kim pitched as a setup man and also started a game after recording 84 relief appearances.

=== 2001 season and the road to the World Series ===
Arizona turned to Kim again as a closer after Mantei was lost to injury for the remaining 2001 season. Kim responded with 19 saves, a 2.94 ERA, and 113 strikeouts in 98 innings.

He made his first career postseason appearance in the NLDS Game 3 at Busch Stadium to protect the Diamondbacks' 5–3 lead against the Cardinals with the go-ahead run at the plate in the 8th inning. After a walk to Albert Pujols that loaded the bases, Kim ended the inning with a center-field flyout. In the 9th inning, Kim saved the game with the game-ending double play off Mark McGwire's bat.

In the NLCS against the Atlanta Braves, Kim worked a scoreless inning in Game 2, in which the Diamondbacks lost. Kim then picked up saves in Games 4 and 5 for the Diamondbacks. Kim entered Game 4 in the 8th inning with the Diamondbacks leading 7–3. However, prior to Kim entering the game, The D-backs had worked themselves into a bases loaded jam with no one out. Kim pitched masterfully in the inning, ending the bases loaded jam with a double play and a lineout. He then retired the next three batters in the 9th inning and picked up the save. The next night, Kim pitched another two shut-out innings and earned the two-inning save that clinched the Diamondbacks' ticket to the World Series. Kim became the first pitcher since Goose Gossage to earn two-inning saves on back-to-back days in the postseason. In the 2004 postseason, Houston Astros closer Brad Lidge matched Gossage and Kim's feat.

With the Diamondbacks up two games to one going into Game 4 of the World Series, Kim relieved Curt Schilling in the eighth inning with the Diamondbacks leading 3–1. Kim struck out Shane Spencer, Scott Brosius, Alfonso Soriano, and Bernie Williams and grounded out Derek Jeter. But Paul O'Neill hit a single off Kim before Williams' plate appearance and Tino Martinez's two-out, two-run home run tied the game in the bottom of the ninth inning. With another home run hit off Kim by Jeter in the bottom of the tenth, the Yankees won the game and tied the Series. Kim threw more than 60 pitches and was charged with the loss. The night after, in Game 5, Diamondbacks manager Bob Brenly sent Kim again to the mound to protect the Diamondbacks' 2–0 lead. Jorge Posada hit a leadoff double off Kim, and after retiring Spencer and Chuck Knoblauch on a groundout and strikeout, Brosius then hit a two-run home run to tie the score. Later, Soriano hit a single in the bottom of the 12th to win the game.

Despite Kim's performances in Games 4 and 5, the Diamondbacks clinched the World Series Championship in Game 7 at Bank One Ballpark. He became the first Asian-born and Korean-born baseball player to appear and win a World Series title.

Kim later revealed in an interview how he felt during the 2001 World Series. "We went through the whole season, approximately 25 guys and then the coaching staff. That time it was like old people. They said, 'OK, we got last chance.' Some people said if we don't win, next year everybody's gone." Kim continued, "Then I gave up a home run. I didn't feel good. But we won."

=== 2002 season ===
In 2002, Kim set a single-season franchise record for saves (36), breaking the old mark set by Gregg Olson in 1998 (30). Kim finished the season with an 8–3 record, 92 strikeouts, and a career-best 2.04 ERA in a team-high 72 appearances. On May 11, 2002, Kim struck out all three batters on nine total pitches in the eighth inning of a 10-inning 6–5 win over the Philadelphia Phillies; he became the 23rd National League pitcher and the 32nd pitcher in major-league history to pitch an immaculate inning.

On June 12, Kim pitched two shut-out innings with four strikeouts and saved the Diamondbacks' 9–5 win over the New York Yankees at Yankee Stadium.

In 2002, Kim converted 36 of 42 save opportunities, eighth-best in the NL. Kim was selected for the All-Star Game.

=== 2003–2004 ===
When Matt Mantei returned from the disabled list and became the Arizona Diamondbacks' closer, Kim joined the starting rotation. As a Diamondbacks starter, he compiled a record of 1–5 with a 3.56 ERA. On May 29, Kim was traded to Boston for Shea Hillenbrand. Kim remained as a starter through June, but the Red Sox made him as their closer after the Red Sox's closer-by-committee approach, implemented following the advice of adviser Bill James, led to several blown saves. On June 27, Kim made his final start for the 2003 season in Boston's 25–8 win against the Florida Marlins at Fenway Park.

Kim became the Red Sox closer in July, converting 16 out of 19 save opportunities despite pitching through lingering ankle and shoulder pain caused by the injury he sustained in April. Although he did not give up an earned run in September, by the time the postseason started Kim was not healthy enough to be effective on the pitching mound.

Kim was pulled in the bottom of the ninth inning with two outs in his only ALDS appearance in Game 1 against the Oakland Athletics. During the lineup announcement in Game 3 at Fenway Park, Red Sox fans intensely booed him. Thinking that he did not deserve the booing after he pitched despite being in pain to advance the Red Sox to the postseason, Kim gave them the middle finger, but later issued an apology. Because of shoulder stiffness, Kim was left off the ALCS roster.

As a starter, Kim went 3–6 with a 3.38 ERA in 12 appearances in 2003. In the beginning of 2004, however, problems with his balance—a lingering effect of the 2003 ankle injury—made him ineffective and cost him a spot in the starting rotation after going 1–1 with a 6.17 ERA in three starts. Bronson Arroyo took Kim's starting rotation spot and Kim was optioned to Triple-A Pawtucket in May. Kim rejoined the Red Sox in September. He was assigned to the bullpen and won one game in 5 2/3 innings of work. Despite not being on the Red Sox roster for their 2004 World Series championship run, he was awarded his second World Series ring by the team.

Kim briefly became a subject of talks between high-ranking U.S. and South Korean diplomats in August 2004. Upon his arrival in Seoul as the new U.S. Ambassador to Korea in August 2004, Christopher R. Hill spoke with his Korean diplomatic counterparts about Kim and the Red Sox, along with the U.S.–Korea relationship and other diplomatic and geopolitical issues surrounding the Korean peninsula.

=== 2005 season ===
Before the 2005 season, the Red Sox sent Kim to the Colorado Rockies, with general manager Theo Epstein calling the two-year deal given to Kim in 2004 a mistake. The Red Sox received left-handed pitcher Chris Narveson, catcher Charles Johnson (who was immediately released), and $2.6 million.

Rockies manager Clint Hurdle gave Kim the choice of taking a spot in the bullpen (Kim posted 0–3 with 7.84 ERA as a middle reliever for the Rockies that season) or a starter position in the Rockies' Triple-A team Colorado Springs Sky Sox. Just 20 minutes later, Hurdle was told that Rockies starter Shawn Chacón was injured and had to go to the disabled list, opening a spot in the Rockies starting rotation for Kim.

On August 8, Sunny Kim, another South Korean starting pitcher who had just joined the Rockies from the Washington Nationals, and Kim started doubleheader games at Coors Field against the Florida Marlins. They became the first two pitchers with same last name to start both ends of doubleheader since Gaylord and Jim Perry for the Cleveland Indians in 1974. The Rockies won both games and Kim collected a win.

Kim finished the season 5–9 with a 4.37 ERA as a starter. He filed for free agency on November 1, 2005, and re-signed with the Rockies. He earned $1.25 million in 2006 with a club option worth $2.5 million in 2007 (with a $250,000 buyout).

=== 2006 World Baseball Classic ===
Kim represented Korea in the World Baseball Classic, held before the 2006 season. Kim had solid shutout middle relief performances during the tournament in Korea's wins against Taiwan in the first round and Japan and the United States in the second round. Kim collected a relief-win against Japan in the second round. In the semifinal game against Japan, Kim relieved Jun Byung-doo in the 7th inning and then allowed a two-run home run to Kosuke Fukudome. Kim intentionally hit the next batter Michihiro Ogasawara. Korea lost the semifinal game and finished third in the tournament.

=== 2006 season ===
Kim began the 2006 campaign with Colorado on the disabled list. He made his season debut on April 30, 2006, against the Florida Marlins in Miami. Kim pitched impressively, giving up only one run on five hits while striking out nine batters. Kim established himself in the Rockies starting rotation for the season.

On May 22, Kim and Los Angeles Dodgers starter Jae Seo, two former high school teammates, started against each other. This game was the first game in which two Korean pitchers started against each other in the major league history. Both pitchers had quality starts, with Seo getting the win.

On May 28, Barry Bonds hit his 715th home run off Kim at SBC Park and surpassed Babe Ruth's 714 career home runs and put himself in sole possession of second place on the all-time career home runs list. After a three-minute delay, Kim struck out the next two batters and pitched 5 1/3 innings to collect a win.

On July 28, Kim had five consecutive strikeouts against the San Diego Padres, tying the Rockies record for consecutive strikeouts. In four different starts, he recorded nine strikeouts each against the Florida Marlins, Houston Astros, Pittsburgh Pirates and Washington Nationals. Kim became the first pitcher in major league history to pitch shutout wins in consecutive starts at hitter-friendly Coors Field, beating the Oakland Athletics on June 19 and the Texas Rangers on June 25.

=== 2007 season ===
Kim began the 2007 season with the Colorado Rockies as a reliever after he lost his starting rotation spot to Josh Fogg. The Rockies' decision to move Kim to the bullpen was controversial. Kim contended that he was not given a fair opportunity during spring training to compete for a starting spot and asked to be traded.

After a spot start on April 15, Kim was placed on the disabled list with an injured thumb. He was assigned to the Rockies' Triple-A team, the Colorado Springs Sky Sox, for a rehab assignment. Kim was concerned that his rehab assignment was longer than necessary and changed his agent to Scott Boras in an effort to get a quicker trade.

On May 13, 2007, the Rockies traded Kim to the Florida Marlins for Jorge Julio. Kim proved himself as a dependable starter in Florida. On August 1, he collected his 50th career win with a career-high ten strikeouts over his former team, the Colorado Rockies. Two days later, Kim was claimed off waivers by the Arizona Diamondbacks. Kim's return to Arizona lasted two starts; the Diamondbacks designated him and Joe Kennedy for assignment on August 14. Shortly after Kim left the team, Diamondbacks closer José Valverde broke Kim's franchise single-season save record.

On August 25, the Florida Marlins re-signed Kim as a free agent. On September 28, Kim collected his tenth win of the season, besting the Mets at Shea Stadium. He was the second South Korean pitcher after Chan Ho Park to win 10 games in a major league season.

=== 2008 season ===
On February 24, 2008, Kim signed with the Pittsburgh Pirates. The Pirates had planned to use Kim exclusively in the bullpen. Kim made his first spring training appearance on March 10, 2008. After a disappointing spring training performance, Kim was released by the Pirates on March 25.

=== 2010 season ===
On February 1, 2010, Kim agreed to a minor league contract with the San Francisco Giants. On March 20, 2010, the Giants granted him his release after he appeared in just one minor league game. Kim later played with the Orange County Flyers of the Golden Baseball League in 2010.

=== 2011 season ===
On January 25, 2011, Kim signed a one-year deal with the Tohoku Rakuten Golden Eagles of the Nippon Professional Baseball (NPB). That year in the NPB, Kim went 0–1 with a 2.66 ERA in 18 games. On November 21, he became free agent.

=== 2012–2015 ===
On January 18, 2012, it was announced that Kim signed a one-year deal with the Nexen Heroes of the KBO League. After being used primarily in relief in the MLB and NPB, Kim was often used as a starting pitcher in the KBO.

On April 10, 2014, he was traded to the Kia Tigers.

He retired from the KBO in 2015 with a career record of 11–23, an ERA of 6.19, and 190 strikeouts.

=== 2018 season ===
Kim returned to professional baseball at age 39 in 2018, making nine relief appearances for the Melbourne Aces of the Australian Baseball League, compiling a 1–0 record with an ERA of 0.93 and nine strikeouts in 9 2/3 innings.

== Pitching style ==
Usually described as a submarine pitcher, Kim was a side-arm and under-arm hard thrower who uses a great variety of deliveries. Kim possesses a four-seam fastball with tailing movement frequently hitting the low 90s, a Frisbee slider with sweeping motion across the plate, an up-shoot slider with a rising motion, and a circle-changeup which he usually uses to strike out left-handed hitters. Nevertheless, during the three seasons between 2004 and 2006, his main problem had been the loss of right pitching balance which caused difficulty in control and reduced velocity. During that time, he also struggled against left-handed batters, allowing them to hit over .300. In 2014, Hall of Famer Adrián Beltré called Kim the toughest pitcher he had ever faced, due in large part to his pitching motion.

== Career highlights ==
- A-Award, Arena Korea and Audi Korea, 2007
- World Baseball Classic (in Japan and the United States of America) 3rd place (2006 Republic of Korea)
- World Series Champion (2001 Arizona Diamondbacks)
- All-Star (2002 National League)

== Personal life ==
Kim owns a Japanese restaurant named Umi Sushi in San Diego. He also operates German sausage restaurant Metz Hannam in Seoul’s Yongsan District and a chain of hamburger and hot dog establishments with locations including Gocheok Sky Dome and Changwon NC Park.

In August 2021, Kim signed with General Entertainment.

== Filmography ==
=== Television series ===
Year	Title	Role	Notes	Ref.
2020	The Penthouse: War in Life	Ju Dan-tae's best friend pitcher	Cameo (Episode 12)	

=== Television show ===
Year	Title	Role	Notes	Ref.
2019–2021	Let's Play Soccer	Cast Member	Episode 1–82	
2019	Law of the Jungle in Sunda Islands	Cast Member	Episode 383–387	
2020	King of Mask Singer	Contestant	"Cherry Blossom Ending" (Episode 247)	
2021	Lets's Play Basketball	Cast Member		
2021	Tomorrow's Baseball King	Coach		
2022	Can't Cheat Blood	Main Host		
2022	legendfestival	Participant		
2022	Youth Baseball Team	Baseball manager		
2022	Sports Golden Bell	contestant	Chuseok Special	

== Awards and nominations ==
Name of the award ceremony, year presented, category, nominee of the award, and the result of the nomination
Award ceremony	Year	Category	Nominee / Work	Result	Ref.
KBS Entertainment Awards	2021	Rookie Award in Reality Category	Boss in the Mirror	Nominated	
KBS Entertainment Awards	2021	Best Entertainer Award	Boss in the Mirror	Won	
KBS Entertainment Awards	2022	Excellence Award in Show and Variety Category	Boss in the Mirror	Won	
MBC Entertainment Awards	2021	Best Couple Award	Kim Byung-hyun (with Hur Jae); It's Good If We Don't Fight	Nominated	
