= Baton Rouge Rougarou =

Collegiate summer baseball team in Texas

- Logo

Information
- League: Texas Collegiate League
- Location: Baton Rouge, Louisiana
- Ballpark: Pete Goldsby Field
- Founded: 2018
- Nickname(s): Roug, The Roux
- League championships: 1 (2025)
- Colors: Black and Green
- Mascot: Roux
- Ownership: Ronnie Rantz
- General manager: Chet Carey
- Website: www.brrougarou.com

The Baton Rouge Rougarou are a collegiate summer baseball team based in Baton Rouge, Louisiana. The team is a member of the Texas Collegiate League (TCL). The Rougarou play their home games at Pete Goldsby Field in Baton Rouge. The Team is currently owned by former LSU Tigers baseball pitcher and current Louisiana Sports Hall of Fame President and CEO Ronnie Rantz.

== History ==
The Baton Rouge Rougarou were founded in September 2018 by Uri Geva, current owner of the Brazos Valley Bombers and Mike Phillips. The Team did not participate in the 2020 Texas Collegiate League season. The Rougarou returned to play in the 2021 season under new ownership by Ricky VanAsselberg. Upon the completion of the 2021 season, the Team was sold to current owner Ronnie Rantz.

== Team Record ==
Baton Rouge Rougarou	Wins	Losses	Result
2021	10	28	
2022	19	23	
2023	20	28	
2024	23	21	
2025	40	11	TCL Champions

== All-TCL Award Nominations ==
2021: Reagan Paulina, SS
2022: Monray Van Der Walt, C; Elliot Hebert, OF; Jaden Beasseaux, P; Sonny Brandwood, P
2023: Joshua Shelly, SS; Connor Spencer, P; Ethan Brister, P
2024: Zeb Ruddell, CF; Fabian Hernandez, P
2025: Blaise Priester, C; Joshua Shelly, 3B; Casey Aritgues, OF; Fabian Hernandez, P; JD Rodriguez, P
