= Woodlands Strykers =

Information
- League: Texas Collegiate League
- Location: The Woodlands, Texas
- Ballpark: Strykers Stadium at The Woodlands Christian Academy
- Founded: 2012
- Folded: 2016
- Colors: Yellow, black
- Ownership: Ramiro Lozano
- Manager: James Dillard

The Woodlands Strykers were a collegiate summer baseball team based in The Woodlands, Texas, 28 miles (45 km) north of Houston, Texas, in the United States. The Strykers were owned by Ramiro Lozano, and were members of the Texas Collegiate League from 2012 to 2016. They played their home games at Strykers Stadium at The Woodlands Christian Academy.

== History ==
In January 2012, Ramiro Lozano, bought a baseball franchise and unveiled them as the Woodlands Strykers. The team consisted of 30 players from American colleges, including 20 from the team's local Houston, Texas, area.

The Strykers played 60 games in their inaugural season against six other teams in the Texas Collegiate League, including 30 home games at The Woodlands Christian Academy in the season that began on June 1, 2012. They played against teams from Bryan, Dallas, Kilgore, and Victoria in Texas, as well as Youngsville, Louisiana. At the end of the season, outfielder Michael Aquino was named the 2012 Texas Collegiate League Player of the Year.

In 2014, Woodlands players Cody Clarke, Andrew Godail, Nolan Holland, Spencer Rahm, Kevin Santana, Gandy Stubblefield, and Mark Whitehead were chosen as Texas Collegiate League All-Stars.

John Villarreal was the head coach for the Strykers.

The team disbanded in 2016.

== Season-by-season results ==
Season	Wins	Losses	Win %	Ref.
2012	22	37	.373	
2013	20	38	.345	
2014	18	41	.305	
2015	13	36	.265	
