= Pete Goldsby Field =

Stadium in Louisiana

Coordinates: 30.4588°N 91.1721°W

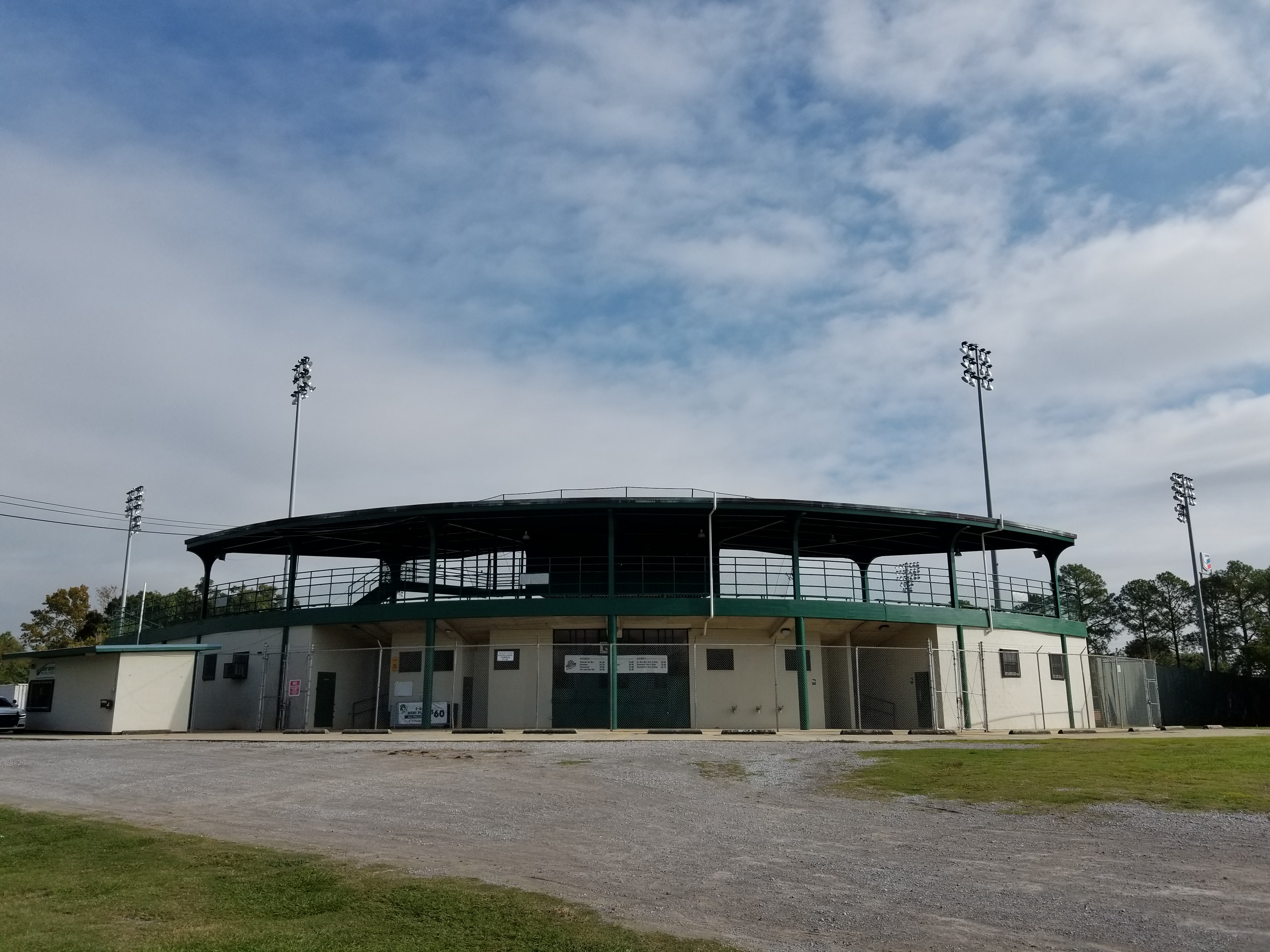
- Interactive map of Pete Goldsby Field
- Location: 1502 Foss St; Baton Rouge, LA 70802
- Owner: BREC
- Capacity: 3,500 (1956); 2,500 (2001); 2,000 (present)
- Surface: Grass
- Field size: LF 325 - CF 395 - RF 345

Construction
- Opened: April 17, 1956

Tenants
- Baton Rouge Rebels (EL) (1956–57); LHSAA (baseball) (1956–present); Baton Rouge Blue Marlins (A-AA) (2001); Baton Rouge Riverbats (SEL) (2002–03); Baton Rouge Rougarou (TCL) (2019–present); Baton Rouge Community College (NJCAA)

Pete Goldsby Field is a baseball stadium in Baton Rouge, Louisiana. The park opened in 1956 and has a seating capacity of 2,000.

== History ==
Goldsby Field was previously home to minor-league baseball Baton Rouge Rebels (Evangeline League) (1956–57), Baton Rouge Blue Marlins (All-American Association) (2001) and Baton Rouge Riverbats (Southeastern League) (2002–03). In 2003, the Houma Hawks of the Southeastern League played eight home games at the park. The Southern Jaguars baseball team has played homes games at the stadium.

Currently, the stadium is home to the Baton Rouge Community College baseball team and the Baton Rouge Rougarou of the Texas Collegiate League who began playing there in the Summer of 2019. The facility is also used by local LHSAA high school baseball teams.
