= All-American Association =

- Most recent season or competition: 2001 All-American Association season
- Sport: Baseball
- Founded: 2001
- Folded: 2001
- No. of teams: 6 (Total)
- Country: United States
- Last champion: Baton Rouge Blue Marlins (1)
- Most titles: Baton Rouge Blue Marlins (1)

The All-American Association was an independent minor league that existed in the southern United States in 2001. Total attendance in 2001 was 200,970. The league folded after the end of the season and four of the league's six teams joined other leagues. The Fort Worth Cats and Tyler Roughnecks joined the Central Baseball League (Tyler relocated to Jackson, Mississippi in January 2002 and became the Jackson Senators). The Baton Rouge Blue Marlins (renamed "River Bats") and Montgomery Wings joined the Southeastern League.

== 2001 Teams ==
| Team | City | Stadium | Manager | Attendance |
|---|---|---|---|---|
| Albany Alligators | Albany, Georgia | Paul Eames Sports Complex | Tom Waelchli; Eddie Dixon | 26,543 |
| Baton Rouge Blue Marlins | Baton Rouge, Louisiana | Pete Goldsby Field | Scott Bethea | 16,616 |
| Fort Worth Cats | Fort Worth, Texas | Lon Goldstein Field | Jim Gentile | 50,426 |
| Montgomery Wings | Montgomery, Alabama | Paterson Field | Lou Thornton | 78,069 |
| Tennessee T's | Winchester, Tennessee | Loel E. Bennett Stadium | Jay Hemond | 10,343 |
| Tyler Roughnecks | Tyler, Texas | Mike Carter Field | Steve Maddock | 18,973 |

== 2001 Final Standings ==
| Team | W | L | PCT | GB |
|---|---|---|---|---|
| Baton Rouge Blue Marlins | 44 | 28 | .611 | -- |
| Albany Alligators | 41 | 31 | .569 | 3 |
| Tyler Roughnecks | 40 | 32 | .556 | 4 |
| Fort Worth Cats | 37 | 35 | .514 | 7 |
| Montgomery Wings | 34 | 38 | .472 | 10 |
| Tennessee T's | 20 | 52 | .278 | 24 |

== 2001 Post-Season ==
Semifinals (best-of-3)

- Baton Rouge defeated Fort Worth, 2 games to 0
- Albany defeated Tyler, 2 games to 1

2001 All-American Association Championship Series (best-of-5)

- Baton Rouge defeated Albany, 3 games to 2

== See also ==
Independent baseball
