= Will Cunnane =

American baseball player (born 1974)

- Pitcher
- Born: April 24, 1974 (age 52); Suffern, New York, U.S.
- Batted: Right Threw: Right

MLB debut
- April 3, 1997, for the San Diego Padres

Last appearance
- May 7, 2004, for the Atlanta Braves

MLB statistics
- Win–loss record: 13–12
- Earned run average: 5.26
- Strikeouts: 234
- Stats at Baseball Reference

Teams
- San Diego Padres (1997–2000); Milwaukee Brewers (2001); Chicago Cubs (2002); Atlanta Braves (2003–2004)

William Joseph Cunnane (born April 24, 1974) is an American former right-handed Major League Baseball pitcher. He graduated from Clarkstown High School North in New City, New York in 1992, where he played baseball and ran cross country. He is 6'2" and he weighs 175 pounds.

== Career ==
=== Florida Marlins ===
Originally signed by the Florida Marlins as an undrafted free agent in 1992, Cunnane spent four seasons mostly as a starter in the minors before making his major league debut. Perhaps his best season was 1994 with the Kane County Cougars when he went 11–3 with a 1.43 ERA in 139 innings pitched.

=== San Diego Padres ===
On December 9, 1996, Cunnane was selected by the San Diego Padres in the Rule 5 Draft. He made his big league debut on April 3, 1997, against the New York Mets at the age of 23. He pitched two innings that game, surrendering two hits, two walks, and no earned runs. The rest of his rookie season was average-in 54 games, he had an ERA of 5.81. Between 1998 and 2000, Cunnane made frequent trips between the majors and minors.

=== Milwaukee Brewers ===
On December 20, 2000, Cunnane was traded to the Milwaukee Brewers as the player to be named later in the December 1 trade that sent Santiago Perez and Chad Green to San Diego and Brandon Kolb to Milwaukee. He played in 31 games for Milwaukee in 2001, pitching to a 5.40 ERA over 52.0 innings pitched. He elected free agency on October 8, 2001.

=== Chicago Cubs ===
On December 14, 2001, Cunnane signed with the Chicago Cubs. In 2002 for Chicago, he pitched in 16 games, giving up 16 runs over 26.1 innings pitched and had a 5.47 ERA for the year. He also spent some time with the Triple-A Iowa Cubs. He elected free agency on December 21, 2002. On January 3, 2003, he resigned with the Cubs organization. After playing in 12 games for Iowa, Cunnane was released on May 12, 2003.

=== Atlanta Braves ===
On July 1, 2003, Cunnane signed with the Atlanta Braves. He pitched to a 2.70 ERA over 20 games for Atlanta and appeared in the 2003 MLB playoffs playing in two games in a 3-2 Division Series loss to the Chicago Cubs. In 2004, he gave up 10 runs over 12.1 innings for the Braves and was sent down to the Triple-A Richmond Braves, where he would finish the season. He elected free agency on October 4, 2004.

Overall, his major league record is 13–12 with a 5.26 ERA, and 234 strikeouts in 274 innings pitched.

=== Second stint with Chicago Cubs ===
On February 16, 2005, Cunnane signed a minor league contract with the Chicago Cubs. After pitching to a 6.32 ERA over 24 games for Iowa, Cunnane was released on June 18, 2005.

=== Houston Astros ===
On June 26, 2005, Cunnane signed a minor league deal with the Houston Astros. He finished the year with the Triple-A Round Rock Express, pitching to a 3.45 ERA over 27 games. He elected free agency on October 15, 2005.

=== Bridgeport Bluefish ===
Cunnane signed with the Bridgeport Bluefish of the Atlantic League of Professional Baseball for the 2006 season. He pitched 12 innings of 3 run ball for Bridgeport in 2006.

=== St. Louis Cardinals ===
On May 10, 2006, Cunnane was sold to the St. Louis Cardinals organization. He pitch in 6 games in 2006 with the Triple-A Memphis Redbirds, carrying a 6.92 ERA before his release on June 26, 2006.

=== Newark Bears ===
In 2008, he played for the Newark Bears of the independent Atlantic League, with whom he again played in 2010.

=== Second stint with Bridgeport ===
In 2011, he played for the Bridgeport Bluefish. He pitched to a 2.82 ERA over 28 games before becoming a free agent at seasons end.
