= Loel E. Bennett Stadium =

Stadium in Winchester, Tennessee

Coordinates: 35.20823°N 86.12629°W

Loel E. Bennett Stadium is a stadium in Winchester, Tennessee. It is primarily used for baseball and was the home of Tennessee T's of the All-American Association as well as the Tennessee Tomahawks of the Heartland League and Big South Leagues. The ballpark has a capacity of 2,500 people and opened in 1993.
