= Geraldo Guzmán =

Dominican baseball player (born 1972)

- Pitcher
- Born: November 28, 1972 (age 52); Tenares, Dominican Republic
- Batted: Right Threw: Right

MLB debut
- July 6, 2000, for the Arizona Diamondbacks

Last MLB appearance
- June 4, 2001, for the Arizona Diamondbacks

CPBL statistics
- Win–loss record: 2–9
- Earned run average: 3.56
- Strikeouts: 74

MLB statistics
- Win–loss record: 5–4
- Earned run average: 5.04
- Strikeouts: 56
- Stats at Baseball Reference

Teams
- Chinatrust Whales (1999); Arizona Diamondbacks (2000–2001); Chinatrust Whales (2003–2004)

Geraldo Moreno Guzmán (born November 28, 1972) is a former professional baseball pitcher from the Dominican Republic. He bats and throws right-handed.

Guzmán was signed by the Montreal Expos as an amateur free agent in 1989. Guzmán pitched in the Dominican Summer League in 1990 and 1991 but suffered arm injuries and was released by the Expos. He spent the next seven or eight years working as a carpenter in the Dominican Republic, during which time he did not play baseball competitively.

Guzmán eventually returned to competitive baseball in Taiwan where he pitched for the Chinatrust Whales. After nine relief appearances for the Whales in 1999, he was signed by the Arizona Diamondbacks before the start of the 2000 season.

He played in 2000 and 2001 with the Arizona Diamondbacks. He had a 5–4 record in 17 games, with a 5.04 ERA.

On November 16, 2001, he was released by Arizona.
