= Denton Outlaws =

The Denton Outlaws were a collegiate summer baseball team based in Denton, Texas, from 2005 to 2007. They played their home games at Falcon Field in Corinth, Texas. The team was quite competitive during their short time in the Texas Collegiate League. In 2005, they were the TCL Champions. In 2006, they won the Rogers Hornsby Division.

== Disbandment ==
The Denton Outlaws were one of seven teams that were disbanded after the league filed a lawsuit because the teams tried to form a new league that were going to copycat that the TCL used. The Outlaws played their last season in 2007.
