= Brandon Kolb =

American baseball player (born 1973)

- Pitcher
- Born: November 20, 1973 (age 52); Oakland, California, U.S.
- Batted: Right Threw: Right

MLB debut
- May 12, 2000, for the San Diego Padres

Last MLB appearance
- September 19, 2001, for the Milwaukee Brewers

MLB statistics
- Win–loss record: 0–1
- Earned run average: 4.67
- Strikeouts: 20
- Stats at Baseball Reference

Teams
- San Diego Padres (2000); Milwaukee Brewers (2001)

Brandon Charles Kolb (born November 20, 1973) is an American former professional baseball relief pitcher. He played in Major League Baseball (MLB) for the San Diego Padres and Milwaukee Brewers in 2000 and 2001.

== Early life ==
Kolb attended Monte Vista High School in Danville, California. He later went to Chabot College and then to Texas Tech.

== Career ==
Standing at 6'1", 190 pounds, Kolb was originally drafted by the Oakland Athletics 1077th overall in the 1993 draft. Deciding not to sign, he would have to wait until 1995 to be drafted again, when he was selected by the Padres in the fourth round. This time, he chose to sign.

Originally a starter in the minors, his best record was 16–9, which he achieved in 1996 with the Clinton LumberKings. Although he showed promise as a starter in the minor leagues, he was being used mostly as a reliever by 1998. He spent 1998 and 1999 entirely as a reliever.

He made his Major League debut on May 12, 2000, against the Arizona Diamondbacks at the age of 26. Although he struck out one batter in the single inning he pitched that game, he also gave up two hits and an earned run. He would improve down the stretch, lowering his season ERA to 3.19. Although he gave up 9 hits in 14 innings that year, not one of them was a home run. He walked 11 and struck out 12 that year.

During the 2000/2001 offseason, Kolb was sent to the Brewers with a player to be named later for Santiago Pérez and a player to be named later. The players to be named would end up being Will Cunnane for the Padres and minor leaguer Chad Green of the Brewers.

His career took a major turn for the worse while with the Brewers in 2001. He did not give up a single earned run until his fifth appearance of 2001, but he still posted a season ERA of 8.98. He gave up five home runs in 9 2/3 innings of work, including three in one inning—on June 20 against the Cincinnati Reds, Kolb gave up home runs to Sean Casey, Michael Tucker, and Pokey Reese. Since he had given up two home runs the game before, Kolb ended up allowing three home runs over a two-game span—he pitched a total of only 1 2/3 innings in that time.

His season ended on September 19, 2001. In his final career game, Kolb allowed two earned runs. He did strike out the final batter he faced in his career, though. It was pitcher Steve Kline.

After his big league career ended, Kolb spent time bouncing around the minors until 2004, even spending time in independent baseball.

Overall in his Major League career, Kolb was 0–1 with a 4.67 ERA in 21 games. In 23 2/3 innings of work, Kolb walked 13 and struck out 20. He went 0-for-2 as a batter, although he did score a run. His fielding percentage was .667.

He wore numbers 47 and 38 in his career.

He currently lives in Steamboat Springs CO and is CEO for CurrentWave Technologies.
