= Matt Mantei =

American baseball player (born 1973)

- Pitcher
- Born: July 7, 1973 (age 53); Tampa, Florida, U.S.
- Batted: Right Threw: Right

MLB debut
- June 18, 1995, for the Florida Marlins

Last MLB appearance
- July 1, 2005, for the Boston Red Sox

MLB statistics
- Win–loss record: 14–18
- Earned run average: 4.07
- Strikeouts: 396
- Saves: 93
- Stats at Baseball Reference

Teams
- Florida Marlins (1995–1999); Arizona Diamondbacks (1999–2004); Boston Red Sox (2005)

Matthew Bruce Mantei (MAN-tie, born July 7, 1973) is an American former Major League Baseball relief pitcher. He played with the Florida Marlins, Arizona Diamondbacks and Boston Red Sox. He threw and batted right-handed.

== Career ==
Mantei had four pitches. He had two fastballs, one of which regularly hit 95 MPH and occasionally hit 100, a sharp curve and an occasional slider. He was also known to throw a knuckleball earlier in his career. Two issues concerning his play were his control and his ability for his arm to stay healthy.

Between 1995 and 1996, Mantei had only pitched in 26 games for the Marlins. He missed the 1997 season due to injury and came back in 1998 to post an ERA of 2.96 in 42 games.

After starting the 1999 season with the Florida Marlins and saving 10 games, he was traded to Arizona Diamondbacks in exchange for Vladimir Núñez, Brad Penny and Abraham Núñez. After posting 32 saves in 1999 between the two teams, Mantei finished 24th in NL MVP voting, earning three vote points. Mantei was slowed by injuries in 2000 and 2001, when a right-elbow injury ended his season in April and he underwent Tommy John surgery ligament replacement surgery.

In 2002, Mantei worked hard to regain his old form. Despite the fact that he missed a month in 2003, he finished strong in the last three months of the season. He had 29 saves while posting a 2.62 ERA.

Mantei missed most of 2004 after a surgery to deal with bone spurs in his shoulder. In 12 games, he was 0–3 with an 11.81 ERA and four saves. At the end of the season he was signed by the Red Sox. 2005 was yet another injury-plagued season for Mantei, as he only pitched 26.3 innings before being placed on the disabled list for the remainder of the year.

The Detroit Tigers invited Mantei to spring training in 2006 to attempt a comeback. After suffering more arm troubles early in the spring, he left camp and was out of baseball until 2008.

Mantei threw a bullpen session for the Tigers on January 11, 2008 and signed a minor league contract with them. However, after experiencing discomfort in his arm a few games into spring training, he was released and retired on March 4.

In a ten-year career with Florida, Arizona, and Boston, Mantei owned a 14–18 record with a 4.07 ERA and 93 saves in 322.7 innings. He also compiled a 1.98 strikeout-to-walk ratio and a 1.39 WHIP.

== Personal life and legal issue ==
On March 4, 2014, Mantei, his then-wife, Erica, and son, Hayden, appeared on the History Channel program Counting Cars, commissioning a custom-restored 1953 Chevy truck. During his playing career, Mantei made his off-season home in Stevensville, Michigan.

On April 17, 2018, Mantei was arrested at his home in St. Joseph, Michigan on an assault and battery charge, but was released the next day. He was booked into the Berrien County Jail after his wife of three months told police Mantei grabbed her by her forearms and threw her to the floor after trying to grab her phone. She also reported he got on top of her to prevent her from moving, later grabbing her by her hands and then began throwing items around the house and tearing things off the walls. TMZ reported that Mantei was given a personal recognizance bond. He was due back in court on May 2 of that year. He pleaded no contest, but the judge reviewed the evidence and found that Mantei committed the offense of domestic violence; he was convicted, but avoided jail time as well as probation and had to instead pay $635 in court fees.

Mantei opened Verde Juice Box the arts district of Benton Harbor, Michigan with his wife, Christine, in 2023.
