= Baton Rouge Riverbats =

- Founded in 2002; Baton Rouge, Louisiana

Minor league affiliations
- Class: Independent
- League: Southeastern League (2002-2003)

Major league affiliations
- Team: None

Minor league titles
- League titles: 2003

Team data
- Name: Riverbats (2003); River Bats (2002)
- Ballpark: Pete Goldsby Field

The Baton Rouge Riverbats (2003) or Baton Rouge River Bats (2002) was a baseball team based in Baton Rouge, Louisiana. They played their home games at Pete Goldsby Field in Baton Rouge.

== History ==
This was the second stint of a professional baseball team in Baton Rouge since 1976. In 2002, they were one of six original members of the Southeastern League.

The 2003 team finished with a record of 38-31 (.551) and won the Southeastern League Championship against the Pensacola Pelicans. The team disbanded after the 2003 season along with the Southeastern League.

== Notable players ==
- Steve Bourgeois
- Seth Thibodeaux
- Jason Williams
- John Henry Williams
