= Baton Rouge Blue Marlins =

The Baton Rouge Blue Marlins, located in Baton Rouge, Louisiana and managed by Scott Bethea, were a professional baseball team in the All-American Association. Both the team and the league existed for only one season, 2001. They played their home games at Pete Goldsby Field. Their record was 44–28 in the regular season, and in the playoffs they beat the Albany Alligators in the semi-finals and the Fort Worth Cats in the championship three games to two.

Bethea, who also played for the team, was named the league's manager of the year.

Their attendance of 16,616 was fifth in the six team league.
