= Bryce Florie =

American baseball player (born 1970)

- Pitcher
- Born: May 21, 1970 (age 56); Charleston, South Carolina, U.S.
- Batted: Right Threw: Right

MLB debut
- July 17, 1994, for the San Diego Padres

Last MLB appearance
- July 21, 2001, for the Boston Red Sox

MLB statistics
- Win–loss record: 20–24
- Earned run average: 4.47
- Strikeouts: 395
- Stats at Baseball Reference

Teams
- San Diego Padres (1994–1996); Milwaukee Brewers (1996–1997); Detroit Tigers (1998–1999); Boston Red Sox (1999–2001)

Bryce Bettancourt Florie (born May 21, 1970) is an American former Major League Baseball pitcher.

Florie pitched for four teams, the San Diego Padres (1994–1996), the Milwaukee Brewers (1996–1997), the Detroit Tigers (1998–1999), and the Boston Red Sox (1999–2001), and finished his career with a 20–24 record, two saves, and an ERA of 4.47.

Florie's pitch selection included a sinking fastball from the 92-93 mph range, a slider, and a changeup.

Florie is remembered for suffering a facial injury that occurred on September 8, 2000, in Fenway Park. The Yankees' Ryan Thompson hit a line drive off Florie's face, causing multiple broken bones and eye damage. Florie made a comeback, pitching in seven games in 2001, but was released by the Red Sox in mid-season.

Florie played for the minor league Sacramento River Cats in 2002 and the Albuquerque Isotopes in 2004. After a two-year break, Florie returned to professional baseball in 2007 playing for the Macon Music of the independent South Coast League. In addition to relief pitching, he also served as the team's pitching coach.

Florie joined the coaching staff of the River City Rascals as the pitching coach for the 2009 season. The Rascals are members of the independent Frontier League. He is currently the pitching coach at his alma mater, Hanahan High School.
