= Texas Collegiate League =

Summer collegiate baseball league in Texas

- Texas Collegiate League logo
- Sport: Baseball
- Founded: 2004
- Commissioner: John Wilson
- No. of teams: 8
- Country: United States
- Most recent champion: Victoria Generals (2026)
- Most titles: Brazos Valley Bombers (7)
- Website: www.texascollegiateleague.com

The Texas Collegiate League (TCL) is a collegiate summer baseball league made up of teams from the states of Texas, Louisiana, and Oklahoma. The league's headquarters are in Coppell, Texas. Uri Geva, owner of the Brazos Valley Bombers, is the league's president.

== History ==
The TCL played its inaugural season in the summer of 2004 with eight teams in the Dallas-Fort Worth area, and was co-founded by Wayne Poage, former athletic director at Dallas Baptist University, and a company controlled by Gerald W. Haddock, a minority owner and General Counsel of the Texas Rangers from 1989 to 1998.

The TCL would nearly fold in 2007, when seven of the original nine teams (all except the McKinney Marshals and the Coppell Copperheads) allegedly decided to boycott the TCL by collectively terminating their interests in the TCL. TCL ceased operations after the season, filed suit against the seven teams to terminate their franchises, and entered into a written license agreement authorizing the owners of the teams who were not part of the boycott (which included the Brazos Valley Bombers and the East Texas Pump Jacks, two new teams which had joined TCL in 2007) to operate a reorganized TCL beginning in 2008.

The 2008 summer season (the first under the reorganized TCL) set new attendance records for the league with the Brazos Valley Bombers making the top 50 attendance list of all summer collegiate teams.

Teams from the Texas Gulf Coast (Victoria Generals), Louisiana (Acadiana Cane Cutters and Alexandria Aces), and Greater Houston (The Woodlands Strykers) later joined the league. The Aces left TCL after 2012 and the Copperheads ceased operations at that time, while the McKinney Marshals continued to play under the name Texas Marshals.

The Woodlands Strykers, who were managed by the Brazos Valley Bombers, went dormant after one season in 2016.

The Lake Charles Gumbeaux Gators are the most recent franchise addition to the TCL, joining the League for the 2024 season.

== Eligibility requirements ==
All players in the league must have NCAA eligibility remaining in order to participate. All players must have completed at least 1 season of college baseball. Players are not paid so as to maintain their college eligibility.

== Season format ==
TCL teams are run similar to professional minor league teams, providing players an opportunity to play under the same conditions as the minor leagues. Games are played six days during the week (Monday is the league-wide off-day), in three series of two games each, and wooden bats and major league specification baseballs are used. Season play occurs from late May through early August in a 48-game, split-season format. Each team will visit every other team three times during the season. The first-half winner and runner-up make the post-season, as do the second-half winner and runner-up; should a team be post-season eligible in both halves, the team with the best overall record not already eligible is selected as a wild card. The first half winner and runner-up are given home-field advantage in the playoffs.

=== 2020 season ===
The league's 2020 season, like virtually every other sporting competition nationwide and globally, was postponed indefinitely in mid-March 2020 due to the COVID-19 pandemic. Subsequently, the TCL developed a plan to begin the season on June 30 with ten teams. One of the five existing teams, the Baton Rouge Bougarou will not take the field in 2020, although they plan to return in 2021. The Acadiana Cane Cutters, Brazos Valley Bombers, Texarkana Twins, and Victoria Generals will be joined by six new teams. There will be two teams based at Hodgetown in Amarillo: the Amarillo Sod Dogs and the Amarillo Sod Squad, both sponsored by the Amarillo Sod Poodles (who are not playing in 2020 because Minor League Baseball has been shut down due to the pandemic.) The remaining four teams will be sponsored by other minor league teams in Texas and Oklahoma: the Frisco RoughRiders, the Round Rock Hairy Men, the San Antonio Chanclas and the Tulsa Drillers. The 10 teams will play a 30-game season followed by two rounds of play-offs. Fans will be allowed in the ballparks, but social distancing and other precautions will be taken.

== Current teams ==
Team	Founded	City	Stadium	Capacity
Abilene Flying Bison	2024	Abilene, Texas	Crutcher Scott Field	4,000
Acadiana Cane Cutters	2011	Lafayette, Louisiana	Fabacher Field	1,400
Baton Rouge Rougarou	2019	Baton Rouge, Louisiana	Pete Goldsby Field	1,600
Brazos Valley Bombers	2007	Bryan-College Station, Texas	Edible Field	2,121
Lake Charles Gumbeaux Gators	2023	Lake Charles, Louisiana	Joe Miller Ballpark	2,000
San Antonio River Monsters	2022	San Antonio, Texas	Sullivan Field	1,000
Sherman Shadowcats	2026	Sherman, Texas	Veteran’s Field	1,200
Victoria Generals	2009	Victoria, Texas	Riverside Stadium	4,000

- Seguin River Monsters
- Alexandria Aces
- Colleyville-Grapevine Lonestars – Colleyville-Grapevine (later the Euless LoneStars and Colleyville LoneStars)
- Coppell Copperheads – Coppell (http://www.tclcopperheads.com)
- Denton Outlaws – Denton (http://www.thedentonoutlaws.com/)
- Duncanville Deputies – Duncanville
- Granbury Generals – Granbury (replaced by the Denton Outlaws)
- Highland Park Blue Sox – Highland Park (later the Plano Blue Sox)
- Mineral Wells Steam – Mineral Wells
- Weatherford Wranglers – Weatherford
- Wichita Falls Roughnecks – Wichita Falls; formerly of Graham
- The Woodland Strykers -The Woodlands
- Texas Tomcats -Weimar **
- East Texas Pumpjacks -Tyler, originally located in Kilgore
- Texas Marshalls - McKinney
- Amarillo Sod Dogs - Amarillo***
- Amarillo Sod Squad - Amarillo***
- Frisco RoughRiders - Frisco***
- Round Rock Hairy Men - Round Rock***
- San Antonio Flying Chanclas - San Antonio***
- Tulsa Drillers - Tulsa***
- Texarkana Twins - Texarkana, Texas (Purchased in 2022 and became the Seguin River Monsters)

(**) Tomcats played only the 2010 season (***) Teams either moved to the MiLB or were dissolved by MiLB teams following the 2020 season

== League champions ==
- 2026 - Victoria Generals (4)
- 2025 - Baton Rouge Rougarou (1)
- 2024 - Victoria Generals
- 2023 - Seguin River Monsters (1)
- 2022 - Acadiana Cane Cutters (1)
- 2021 - San Antonio Flying Chanclas (1)
- 2020 - Brazos Valley Bombers (7)
- 2019 - Brazos Valley Bombers
- 2018 – Victoria Generals
- 2017 – Brazos Valley Bombers
- 2016 – Brazos Valley Bombers
- 2015 – Brazos Valley Bombers
- 2014 – Brazos Valley Bombers
- 2013 – Brazos Valley Bombers
- 2012 – East Texas Pump Jacks (1)
- 2011 – Coppell Copperheads (4)
- 2010 – Victoria Generals
- 2009 – Coppell Copperheads
- 2008 – McKinney Marshals (2)
- 2007 – Coppell Copperheads
- 2006 – McKinney Marshals
- 2005 – Denton Outlaws (1)
- 2004 – Coppell Copperheads

== Notable TCL alumni ==
Since the TCL was established, more than 300 TCL players have been drafted by major league teams and no fewer than 20 have played in the big leagues. Notable TCL alumni include:

- Jake Arrieta – Baltimore Orioles, Chicago Cubs, Philadelphia Phillies, San Diego Padres
- Brandon Belt – San Francisco Giants
- Clay Buchholz – Boston Red Sox, Philadelphia Phillies, Arizona Diamondbacks, Toronto Blue Jays
- Matt Carpenter – St. Louis Cardinals, New York Yankees
- Tyler Collins – Detroit Tigers
- Todd Cunningham – Atlanta Braves, Los Angeles Angels
- Chris Davis – Texas Rangers, Baltimore Orioles
- Paul Goldschmidt – Arizona Diamondbacks, St. Louis Cardinals
- Corey Kluber – Cleveland Indians, Texas Rangers, New York Yankees
- Adam Moore – Seattle Mariners, Kansas City Royals, San Diego Padres, Cleveland Indians, Tampa Bay Rays
- Hunter Pence – Houston Astros, Philadelphia Phillies, San Francisco Giants, Texas Rangers
- Tony Gonsolin – Los Angeles Dodgers
- Hunter Dozier – Kansas City Royals
- Kyle Keller – Miami Marlins, Los Angeles Angels, Pittsburgh Pirates
- Taylor Hearn – Texas Rangers
- Louis Head – Tampa Bay Rays
- Alec Mills – Kansas City Royals, Chicago Cubs
- Kyle Martin – Boston Red Sox
- A. J. Minter – Atlanta Braves
- Corbin Martin – Houston Astros, Arizona Diamondbacks
- Bryce Miller – Seattle Mariners
