= 2000 New York Mets season =

2000 New York Mets
- National League champions National League Wild Card winners
- League: National League
- Division: East
- Ballpark: Shea Stadium
- City: New York
- Record: 94–68 (.580)
- Divisional place: 2nd
- Owners: Nelson Doubleday Jr., Fred Wilpon
- General manager: Steve Phillips
- Manager: Bobby Valentine
- Television: WPIX-TV/Fox Sports New York (Ralph Kiner, Tom Seaver, Fran Healy, Howie Rose, Gary Thorne)
- Radio: WFAN (Bob Murphy, Gary Cohen, Ed Coleman); WADO (Spanish) (Juan Alicea, Billy Berroa)

The 2000 New York Mets season was the 39th regular season for the Mets. They entered the season as defending National League runner ups, losing to the Atlanta Braves in the NLCS. They went 94–68 and finished second in the National League East, but earned the NL Wild Card. They made it to the World Series where they were defeated by their crosstown rival the New York Yankees. They were managed by Bobby Valentine. They played home games at Shea Stadium.

== Offseason ==
- December 10, 1999: Jesse Orosco was traded by the Baltimore Orioles to the New York Mets for Chuck McElroy.
- December 23, 1999: Mike Hampton traded by the Houston Astros with Derek Bell to the New York Mets for Kyle Kessel (minors), Roger Cedeño, and Octavio Dotel.
- January 19, 2000: Charlie Hayes signed as a free agent with the New York Mets.
- January 20, 2000: Curtis Pride was signed as a free agent with the New York Mets.
- January 21, 2000: Bill Pulsipher was traded by the Milwaukee Brewers to the New York Mets for Luis Lopez.
- March 18, 2000: Jesse Orosco was traded by the New York Mets to the St. Louis Cardinals for Joe McEwing.
- March 20, 2000: Charlie Hayes was released by the New York Mets.

== Regular season ==
The Mets played in the first game held outside of North America on Opening Day, March 29. The Mets played the Chicago Cubs in front of over 55,000 at the Tokyo Dome in Tokyo, Japan. The Cubs won the game by a score of 5–3.

=== Season standings ===
NL East
Team	W	L	Pct.	GB	Home	Road
Atlanta Braves	95	67	.586	—	51‍–‍30	44‍–‍37
New York Mets	94	68	.580	1	55‍–‍26	39‍–‍42
Florida Marlins	79	82	.491	15½	43‍–‍38	36‍–‍44
Montreal Expos	67	95	.414	28	37‍–‍44	30‍–‍51
Philadelphia Phillies	65	97	.401	30	34‍–‍47	31‍–‍50

=== Record vs. opponents ===
2000 National League record Source: NL Standings Head-to-Head
Team	AZ	ATL	CHC	CIN	COL	FLA	HOU	LAD	MIL	MON	NYM	PHI	PIT	SD	SF	STL	AL
Arizona	—	3–6	5–4	2–5	7–6	4–5	6–1	7–6	4–5	4–5	2–7	8–1	7–2	9–4	6–7	5–4	6–9
Atlanta	6–3	—	4–5	2–5	5–4	6–6	5–4	7–2	6–3	6–7	7–6	8–5	5–2	8–1	6–3	3–4	11–7
Chicago	4–5	5–4	—	4–8	4–5	1–6	5–7	3–6	6–7	4–5	2–5	6–3	3–9	3–5	4–5	3–10	8–7
Cincinnati	5–2	5–2	8–4	—	6–3	3–6	7–5	4–5	5–8–1	6–3	5–4	3–4	7–6	4–5	3–6	7–6	7–8
Colorado	6–7	4–5	5–4	3–6	—	4–5	5–4	4–9	4–5	7–2	3–6	6–3	7–2	7–6	6–7	5–3	6–6
Florida	5–4	6–6	6–1	6–3	5–4	—	3–5	2–7	3–4	7–6	6–6	9–4	5–4	2–7	3–6	3–6	8–9
Houston	1–6	4–5	7–5	5–7	4–5	5–3	—	3–6	7–6	4–5	2–5	5–4	10–3	2–7	1–8	6–6	6–9
Los Angeles	6–7	2–7	6–3	5–4	9–4	7–2	6–3	—	3–4	5–3	4–5	5–4	4–5	8–5	7–5	3–6	6–9
Milwaukee	5–4	3–6	7–6	8–5–1	5–4	4–3	6–7	4–3	—	4–5	2–7	2–5	7–5	2–7	3–6	5–7	6–9
Montreal	5–4	7–6	5–4	3–6	2–7	6–7	5–4	3–5	5–4	—	3–9	5–7	3–4	3–6	3–6	2–5	7–11
New York	7–2	6–7	5–2	4–5	6–3	6–6	5–2	5–4	7–2	9–3	—	6–7	7–2	3–6	3–5	6–3	9–9
Philadelphia	1–8	5–8	3–6	4–3	3–6	4–9	4–5	4–5	5–2	7–5	7–6	—	3–6	2–5	2–7	2–7	9–9
Pittsburgh	2–7	2–5	9–3	6–7	2–7	4–5	3–10	5–4	5–7	4–3	2–7	6–3	—	7–2	2–6	4–8	6–9
San Diego	4–9	1–8	5–3	5–4	6–7	7–2	7–2	5–8	7–2	6–3	6–3	5–2	2–7	—	5–7	0–9	5–10
San Francisco	7–6	3–6	5–4	6–3	7–6	6–3	8–1	5–7	6–3	6–3	5–3	7–2	6–2	7–5	—	5–4	8–7
St. Louis	4–5	4–3	10–3	6–7	3–5	6–3	6–6	6–3	7–5	5–2	3–6	7–2	8–4	9–0	4–5	—	7–8

=== Transactions ===
- April 26, 2000: Curtis Pride was sent to the Boston Red Sox by the New York Mets as part of a conditional deal.
- May 13, 2000: Rickey Henderson was released by the New York Mets.
- June 2, 2000: Bill Pulsipher was traded by the New York Mets to the Arizona Diamondbacks for Lenny Harris.
- July 26, 2000: Justin Huber was signed by the New York Mets as an amateur free agent.
- July 28, 2000: Mike Bordick was traded by the Baltimore Orioles to the New York Mets for Lesli Brea, Mike Kinkade, Melvin Mora, and Pat Gorman (minors).
- August 30, 2000: Jorge Velandia was traded by the Oakland Athletics to the New York Mets for Nelson Cruz.

== Roster ==
2000 New York Mets
Roster
Pitchers: 49 Armando Benítez; 29 Eric Cammack; 27 Dennis Cook; 45 John Franco; 32 Mike Hampton; 28 Bobby J. Jones; 21 Bobby M. Jones; 22 Al Leiter; 23 Pat Mahomes; 39 Jim Mann; 25 Bill Pulsipher; 35 Rick Reed; 34 Jerrod Riggan; 36 Grant Roberts; 46 Rich Rodriguez; 48 Glendon Rusch; 34 Dennis Springer; 99 Turk Wendell; 51 Rick White	Catchers: 31 Mike Piazza; 7 Todd Pratt; 3 Vance Wilson; Infielders: 20 Kurt Abbott; 13 Edgardo Alfonzo; 17 Mike Bordick; 15 Matt Franco; 19 Lenny Harris; 5 Mark Johnson; 26 David Lamb; 6 Melvin Mora; 10 Rey Ordóñez; 30 Jorge Toca; 11 Jorge Velandia; 4 Robin Ventura; 9 Todd Zeile	Outfielders: 50 Benny Agbayani; 16 Derek Bell; 18 Darryl Hamilton; 24 Rickey Henderson; 33 Mike Kinkade; 47 Joe McEwing; 40 Ryan McGuire; 26 Jon Nunnally; 44 Jay Payton; 6 Timo Pérez; 33 Bubba Trammell; 11 Jason Tyner	Manager: 2 Bobby Valentine; Coaches: 54 Al Jackson (bullpen); 53 Tom Robson (hitting); 8 Cookie Rojas (third base); 12 John Stearns (bench); 52 Dave Wallace (pitching); 1 Mookie Wilson (first base)

== Game log ==
=== Regular season ===
Legend
Mets Win	Mets Loss	Game Postponed	Clinched playoff spot
Bold = Mets team member

2000 regular season game log: 94–68 (Home: 55–26; Away: 39–42)
March: 1–1 (Home: 0–1; Away: 1–0)

#	Date	Time (ET)	Opponent	Score	Win	Loss	Save	Time of Game	Location (Attendance)	Series	Box/ Streak
1	March 29		Cubs	3–5	Lieber (1–0)	**Hampton** (0–1)	Aguilera (1)		Tokyo Dome (55,000)	0–1	L1
2	March 30		@ Cubs	5–1 (11)	**Cook** (1–0)	Young (0–1)	—		Tokyo Dome (55,000)	1–1	W1

April: 15–9 (Home: 10–5; Away: 5–4)

#	Date	Time (ET)	Opponent	Score	Win	Loss	Save	Time of Game	Location (Attendance)	Series	Box/ Streak
3	April 3		Padres	2–1	**Leiter** (1–0)	Wall (0–1)	**Benitez** (1)		**Shea Stadium** (52,308)	2–1	W2
4	April 5		Padres	0–4	Williams (1–0)	**B. J. Jones** (0–1)	—		**Shea Stadium** (17,585)	2–2	L1
5	April 6		Padres	5–8	Clement (1–0)	**Hampton** (0–2)	—		**Shea Stadium** (17,482)	2–3	L2
6	April 7		Dodgers	2–1	**Reed** (1–0)	Dreifort (0–1)	**Benitez** (2)		**Shea Stadium** (27,791)	3–3	W1
7	April 8		Dodgers	5–6 (10)	Fetters (1–0)	**Benitez** (0–1)	Shaw (1)		**Shea Stadium** (37,814)	3–4	L1
–	April 9		Dodgers	Postponed (snow); rescheduled for April 24							
8	April 10		@ Phillies	7–9	Telemaco (1–0)	**Rodriguez** (0–1)	Gomes (3)		Veterans Stadium (47,115)	3–5	L2
9	April 12		@ Phillies	5–8	Person (1–0)	**Hampton** (0–3)	Gomes (4)		Veterans Stadium (15,269)	3–6	L3
10	April 13		@ Phillies	2–1	**Cook** (2–0)	Aldred (0–1)	**Benitez** (3)		Veterans Stadium (14,552)	4–6	W1
11	April 14		@ Pirates	8–5 (12)	**Franco** (1–0)	Silva (2–1)	—		Three Rivers Stadium (20,725)	5–6	W2
12	April 15		@ Pirates	0–2	Anderson (1–0)	**Rusch** (0–1)	Williams (2)		Three Rivers Stadium (19,592)	5–7	L1
13	April 16		@ Pirates	12–9	**Mahomes** (1–0)	Peters (0–1)	**Benitez** (4)		Three Rivers Stadium (20,724)	6–7	W1
14	April 18		Brewers	10–7	**Hampton** (1–3)	Navarro (0–3)	**Benitez** (5)		**Shea Stadium** (17,905)	7–7	W2
15	April 19		Brewers	3–1	**Reed** (2–0)	Bere (2–1)	**Benitez** (6)		**Shea Stadium** (18,001)	8–7	W3
16	April 20		Brewers	5–4 (10)	**Wendell** (1–0)	Leskanic (0–1)	—		**Shea Stadium** (17,002)	9–7	W4
–	April 21		Cubs	Postponed (rain); rescheduled for April 22							
17	April 22 (1)		Cubs	8–3	**Rusch** (1–1)	Lieber (1–2)	—		**Shea Stadium** (N/A)	10–7	W5
18	April 22 (2)		Cubs	7–6	**Cook** (3–0)	Farnsworth (1–3)	**Benitez** (7)		**Shea Stadium** (32,204)	11–7	W6
19	April 23		Cubs	15–8	**Hampton** (2–3)	Tapani (0–3)	—		**Shea Stadium** (27,560)	12–7	W7
20	April 24		Dodgers	1–0	**Benitez** (1–1)	Adams (1–1)	—		**Shea Stadium** (37,987)	13–7	W8
21	April 25		Reds	6–5	**Wendell** (2–0)	Sullivan (0–1)	**Benitez** (8)		**Shea Stadium** (27,153)	14–7	W9
22	April 26		Reds	1–12	Neagle (2–0)	**Springer** (0–1)	—		**Shea Stadium** (33,371)	14–8	L1
23	April 27		Reds	1–2 (12)	Graves (3–0)	**Benitez** (1–2)	Sullivan (1)		**Shea Stadium** (50,971)	14–9	L2
24	April 28		@ Rockies	5–12	Astacio (2–2)	**Hampton** (2–4)	—		Coors Field (45,366)	14–10	L3
25	April 29		@ Rockies	13–6	**Reed** (3–0)	Yoshii (1–2)	—		Coors Field (41,220)	15–10	W1
26	April 30		@ Rockies	14–11	**Leiter** (2–0)	Bohanon (0–3)	—		Coors Field (36,252)	16–10	W2

May: 13–14 (Home: 5–3; Away: 8–11)

#	Date	Time (ET)	Opponent	Score	Win	Loss	Save	Time of Game	Location (Attendance)	Series	Box/ Streak
27	May 1		@ Giants	3–10	Estes (1–1)	**Pulsipher** (0–1)	—		Pacific Bell Park (40,930)	16–11	L1
28	May 2		@ Giants	1–7	Hernandez (1–4)	**Rusch** (1–2)	—		Pacific Bell Park (40,930)	16–12	L2
29	May 3		@ Giants	5–8 (11)	Rodriguez (1–0)	**Wendell** (2–1)	—		Pacific Bell Park (40,930)	16–13	L3
30	May 4		@ Giants	2–7	Rodriguez (2–0)	**Reed** (3–1)	—		Pacific Bell Park (40,930)	16–14	L4
31	May 5		@ Marlins	4–1	**Leiter** (3–0)	Sanchez (3–1)	**Franco** (1)		Pro Player Stadium (30,229)	17–14	W1
32	May 6		@ Marlins	1–9	Fernandez (4–3)	**Pulsipher** (0–2)	—		Pro Player Stadium (33,401)	17–15	L1
33	May 7		@ Marlins	0–3	Dempster (3–2)	**Rusch** (1–3)	—		Pro Player Stadium (25,147)	17–16	L2
34	May 9		@ Pirates	2–0	**Hampton** (3–4)	Benson (2–4)	**Benitez** (9)		Three Rivers Stadium (14,015)	18–16	W1
35	May 10		@ Pirates	9–13	Silva (3–1)	**Cook** (3–1)	—		Three Rivers Stadium (13,711)	18–17	L1
36	May 11		@ Pirates	3–2	**Leiter** (4–0)	Anderson (1–1)	—		Three Rivers Stadium (16,264)	19–17	W1
37	May 12		Marlins	4–6	Dempster (4–2)	**Rusch** (1–4)	Alfonseca (12)		**Shea Stadium** (30,828)	19–18	L1
38	May 13		Marlins	6–7	Mahay (1–1)	**Cook** (3–2)	Alfonseca (13)		**Shea Stadium** (32,772)	19–19	L2
39	May 14		Marlins	5–1	**Hampton** (4–4)	Penny (3–5)	—		**Shea Stadium** (36,162)	20–19	W1
40	May 16		Rockies	3–4 (11)	Tavarez (2–2)	**Wendell** (2–2)	Jimenez (5)		**Shea Stadium** (25,697)	20–20	L1
41	May 17		Rockies	4–2	**Leiter** (5–0)	Arrojo (1–4)	**Franco** (2)		**Shea Stadium** (23,665)	21–20	W1
–	May 18		Rockies	Postponed (rain); rescheduled for August 15							
42	May 19		Diamondbacks	4–3	**B. J. Jones** (1–1)	Stottlemyre (7–2)	**Benitez** (10)		**Shea Stadium** (25,292)	22–20	W2
43	May 20		Diamondbacks	8–7	**Hampton** (5–4)	Daal (1–5)	**Benitez** (11)		**Shea Stadium** (37,121)	23–20	W3
44	May 21		Diamondbacks	7–6	**Wendell** (3–2)	Kim (2–2)	—		**Shea Stadium**(38,826)	24–20	W4
45	May 22		@ Padres	0–1	Clement (5–3)	**Franco** (1–1)	Hoffman (8)		Qualcomm Stadium (17,966)	24–21	L1
46	May 23		@ Padres	5–3 (10)	**Wendell** (4–2)	Hoffman (0–1)	**Benitez** (12)		Qualcomm Stadium (25,783)	25–21	W1
47	May 24		@ Padres	4–5	Wall (1–2)	**Mahomes** (1–1)	Hoffman (9)		Qualcomm Stadium (19,405)	25–22	L1
48	May 26		@ Cardinals	5–2	**Hampton** (6–4)	Thompson (0–1)	**Benitez** (13)		Busch Stadium (40,028}	26–22	W1
49	May 27		@ Cardinals	12–8	**Cook** (4–2)	Veres (0–2)	—		Busch Stadium (48,690)	27–22	W3
50	May 28		@ Cardinals	6–2	**Rusch** (2–4)	Kile (7–3)	—		Busch Stadium (46,344)	28–22	W4
51	May 29		@ Dodgers	1–4	Park (5–4)	**Leiter** (5–1)	—		Dodger Stadium (43,084)	28–23	L1
52	May 30		@ Dodgers	10–5	**Franco** (2–1)	Shaw (2–3)	—		Dodger Stadium (26,102)	29–23	W1
53	May 31		@ Dodgers	3–4	Fetters (2–0)	**Wendell** (4–3)	—		Dodger Stadium (31,323)	29–24	L1

June: 16–8 (Home: 12–5; Away: 4–3)

#	Date	Time (ET)	Opponent	Score	Win	Loss	Save	Time of Game	Location (Attendance)	Series	Box/ Streak
54	June 2		Devil Rays	5–3	**Rusch** (3–4)	White (1–4)	**Benitez** (14)		**Shea Stadium** (24,123)	30–24	W1
55	June 3		Devil Rays	1–0	**Leiter** (6–1)	Trachsel (3–6)	**Benitez** (15)		**Shea Stadium** (33,694)	31–24	W2
56	June 4		Devil Rays	5–15	Yan (3–3)	**B. J. Jones** (1–2)	—		**Shea Stadium** (43,610)	31–25	L1
57	June 5		Orioles	2–4	Mussina (3–6)	**Hampton** (6–5)	Timlin (5)		**Shea Stadium** (25,192)	31–26	L2
–	June 6		Orioles	Postponed (rain); rescheduled for June 8							
58	June 7		Orioles	11–3	**Mahomes** (2–1)	Erickson (2–3)	—		**Shea Stadium** (34,492)	32–26	W1
59	June 8		Orioles	8–7 (10)	**Cook** (5–2)	Mercedes (2–3)	—		**Shea Stadium** (9,540)	33–26	W2
60	June 9	7:05 p.m. EDT	@ Yankees	12–2	**Leiter** (7–1)	Clemens (4–6)	—	3:30	Yankee Stadium (55,822)	34–26	W3
61	June 10	1:05 p.m. EDT	@ Yankees	5–13	Pettitte (6–2)	**B. J. Jones** (1–3)	—	3:13	Yankee Stadium (55,839)	34–27	W4
—	June 11	8:05 p.m. EDT	@ Yankees	Postponed (rain); rescheduled for July 8							
62	June 13		@ Cubs	3–4	Heredia (3–1)	**Franco** (2–2)	Aguilera (13)		Wrigley Field (38,879)	34–28	L2
63	June 14		@ Cubs	10–8	**Rusch** (4–4)	Garibay (1–2)	**Benitez** (16)		Wrigley Field (38,625)	35–28	W1
64	June 16		@ Brewers	7–1	**Leiter** (8–1)	Haynes (7–5)	—		County Stadium (18,979)	36–28	W2
65	June 17		@ Brewers	2–3	Snyder (2–2)	**Rusch** (4–5)	Wickman (8)		County Stadium (26,125)	36–29	L1
66	June 18		@ Brewers	7–3	**Reed** (4–1)	Bere (4–6)	—		County Stadium (20,133)	37–29	W1
67	June 20		Phillies	2–3 (10)	Brock (3–4)	**Benitez** (1–3)	Brantley (9)		**Shea Stadium** (40,386)	37–30	L1
68	June 21		Phillies	5–10	Gomes (4–4)	**Franco** (2–3)	—		**Shea Stadium** (22,524)	37–31	L2
69	June 22		Phillies	5–4	**Rusch** (5–5)	Politte (1–2)	**Cook** (1)		**Shea Stadium** (21,005)	38–31	W1
70	June 23		Pirates	12–2	**B. J. Jones** (2–3)	Arroyo (0–1)	—		**Shea Stadium** (39,849)	39–31	W2
71	June 24		Pirates	10–8	**Franco** (3–3)	Loiselle (0–3)	**Benitez** (17)		**Shea Stadium** (34,894)	40–31	W3
72	June 25		Pirates	9–0	**Hampton** (7–5)	Benson (6–6)	—		**Shea Stadium** (38,984)	41–31	W4
73	June 26		Marlins	10–5	**Leiter** (9–1)	Cornelius (2–2)	—		**Shea Stadium** (19,657)	42–31	W5
74	June 27		Marlins	5–2	**Rusch** (6–5)	Sanchez (4–7)	**Benitez** (18)		**Shea Stadium** (22,103)	43–31	W6
75	June 28		Marlins	6–5	**B. J. Jones** (3–3)	Penny (4–7)	**Franco** (3)		**Shea Stadium** (37,252)	44–31	W7
76	June 29		Braves	4–6	Burkett (6–3)	**Reed** (4–2)	Lightenberg (6)		**Shea Stadium** (46,998)	44–32	L1
77	June 30		Braves	11–8	**Benitez** (2–3)	Mulholland (8–7)	—		**Shea Stadium** (52,831)	45–32	W1

July: 14–13 (Home: 8–4; Away: 6–9)

#	Date	Time (ET)	Opponent	Score	Win	Loss	Save	Time of Game	Location (Attendance)	Series	Box/ Streak
78	July 1		Braves	9–1	**Leiter** (10–1)	Maddux (9–3)	—		**Shea Stadium** (44,593)	46–32	W2
79	July 2		Braves	2–10	Glavine (8–5)	**Rusch** (6–6)	—		**Shea Stadium** (45,261)	46–33	L1
80	July 3		@ Marlins	0–2	Almanza (2–0)	**Wendell** (4–4)	—		Pro Player Stadium (15,844)	46–34	L2
81	July 4		@ Marlins	8–9	Darensbourg (4–0)	**B. M. Jones** (0–1)	Alfonseca (26)		Pro Player Stadium (24,935)	46–35	W1
82	July 5		@ Marlins	11–2	**Hampton** (8–5)	Smith (0–2)	—		Pro Player Stadium (14,765)	47–35	W2
83	July 7	7:10 p.m. EDT	Yankees	1–2	Hernández (8–6)	**Leiter** (10–2)	Rivera (19)	2:54	**Shea Stadium** (54,132)	47–36	L1
84	July 8 (1)	1:15 p.m. EDT	Yankees	2–4	Gooden (3–3)	**B. J. Jones** (3–4)	Rivera (20)	3:16	**Shea Stadium** (54,165)	47–37	L2
85	July 8 (2)	8:05 p.m. EDT	@ Yankees	2–4	Clemens (6–6)	**Rusch** (6–7)	Rivera (21)	2:36	Yankee Stadium (55,821)	47–38	L3
86	July 9	1:10 p.m. EDT	Yankees	2–0	**Hampton** (9–5)	Pettitte (9–5)	**Benítez** (19)	3:11	**Shea Stadium** (54,286)	48–38	W1
—	July 11	8:45 p.m. EDT	71st All-Star Game	American League vs. National League (Turner Field, Atlanta, Georgia)							
87	July 13		@ Red Sox	3–4	Garces (4–0)	**Benitez** (2–4)	—		Fenway Park (33,894)	48–39	L1
88	July 14		@ Red Sox	6–4	**Mahomes** (3–1)	Lowe (2–4)	**Benitez** (20)		Fenway Park (33,293)	49–39	W1
89	July 15		@ Red Sox	4–6	Martinez (7–5)	**Hampton** (9–6)	Lowe (20)		Fenway Park (33,213)	49–40	L1
90	July 16		@ Blue Jays	3–7	Halladay (4–5)	**Leiter** (10–3)	Koch (21)		SkyDome (30,139)	49–41	L1
91	July 17		@ Blue Jays	7–5 (11)	**Franco** (4–3)	Borbon (1–1)	**Benitez** (21)		SkyDome (23,129)	50–41	W1
92	July 18		@ Blue Jays	11–7	**B. J. Jones** (4–4)	Carpenter (7–9)	—		SkyDome (24,633)	51–41	W2
93	July 19		@ Expos	5–3	**Mahomes** (4–1)	Kline (1–3)	**Benitez** (22)		Olympic Stadium (14,198)	52–41	W3
94	July 20		@ Expos	1–4	Hermanson (8–7)	**Hampton** (9–7)	Strickland (1)		Olympic Stadium (13,641)	52–42	L1
95	July 21		@ Braves	3–6	Burkett (7–4)	**Leiter** (10–4)	Remlinger (8)		Turner Field (49,313)	52–43	LL2
96	July 22		@ Braves	4–0	**Reed** (5–2)	Maddux (12–4)	—		Turner Field (48,141)	53–43	W1
97	July 23		@ Braves	0–1	Ashby (6–7)	**B. J. Jones** (4–5)	—		Turner Field (46,872)	53–44	L1
98	July 25		Expos	5–0	**Rusch** (7–7)	Hermanson (8–8)	—		**Shea Stadium** (41,028)	54–44	W1
–	July 26		Expos	Postponed (rain); rescheduled for July 27							
99	July 27 (1)		Expos	9–8	**Franco** (5–3)	Strickland (2–1)	**Benitez** (23)		**Shea Stadium** (N/A)	55–44	W2
100	July 27 (2)		Expos	4–3	**Hampton** (10–7)	Irabu (2–5)	—		**Shea Stadium** (35,088)	56–44	W3
101	July 28		Cardinals	3–2	**Leiter** (11–4)	Hentgen (9–8)	**Benitez** (24)		**Shea Stadium** (42,396)	57–44	W4
102	July 29		Cardinals	4–3	**White** (4–6)	James (0–2)	**Benitez** (25)		**Shea Stadium** (50,726)	58–44	W5
103	July 30		Cardinals	4–2	**B. J. Jones** (5–5)	Stephenson (11–7)	—		**Shea Stadium** (45,733)	59–44	W6
104	July 31		Reds	0–6	Williamson (4–7)	**Rusch** (7–8)	Luebbers (1)		**Shea Stadium** (42,774)	59–45	L1

August: 20–9 (Home: 12–4; Away: 8–5)

#	Date	Time (ET)	Opponent	Score	Win	Loss	Save	Time of Game	Location (Attendance)	Series	Box/ Streak
105	August 1		Reds	3–2	**Hampton** (11–7)	Parris (5–14)	**Benitez** (26)		**Shea Stadium** (39,572)	60–45	W1
106	August 2		Reds	2–1	**Leiter** (12–4)	Dessens (5–1)	**Benitez** (27)		**Shea Stadium** (42,111)	61–45	W2
107	August 4		@ Diamondbacks	6–1	**Reed** (6–2)	Johnson (15–4)	**Cook** (2)		Bank One Ballpark (41,832)	62–45	W3
108	August 5		@ Diamondbacks	6–2	**B. J. Jones** (6–5)	Guzman (3–2)	**R. White** (3)		Bank One Ballpark (41,656)	63–45	W4
109	August 6		@ Diamondbacks	5–9	Reynoso (8–7)	**Rusch** (7–9)	Mantei (8)		Bank One Ballpark (39,641)	63–46	L1
110	August 7		@ Astros	6–5 (11)	**Benitez** (3–4)	Green (1–1)	—		Enron Field (36,536)	64–46	W1
111	August 8		@ Astros	3–9	Powell (1–0)	**Leiter** (12–5)	—		Enron Field (38,031)	64–47	L1
112	August 9		@ Astros	12–5	**Reed** (7–2)	Lima (4–14)	—		Enron Field (35,432)	65–47	W1
113	August 10		@ Astros	10–3	**B. J. Jones** (7–5)	McKnight (0–1)	—		Enron Field (37,870)	66–47	W2
114	August 11		Giants	4–1	**Rusch** (8–9)	Gardner (7–6)	**Benitez** (28)		**Shea Stadium** (33,944)	67–47	W3
115	August 12		Giants	3–2	**Hampton** (12–7)	Rodriguez (4–2)	**Benitez** (29)		**Shea Stadium** (50,064)	68–47	W4
116	August 13		Giants	2–0	**Leiter** (13–5)	Hernandez (11–9)	**Franco** (4)		**Shea Stadium** (39,841)	69–47	W5
117	August 14		Giants	1–11	Ortiz (8–10)	**Reed** (7–3)	—		**Shea Stadium** (35,296)	69–48	L1
118	August 15 (1)		Rockies	7–5	**Cook** (6–2)	House (1–1)	**Benitez** (30)		**Shea Stadium** (N/A)	70–48	W1
119	August 15 (2)		Rockies	4–3	**B. J. Jones** (8–5)	Chouinard (1–2)	**Benitez** (31)		**Shea Stadium** (29,744)	71–48	W2
120	August 16		Rockies	5–7	Bohanon (7–8)	**Rusch** (8–10)	G. White (4)		**Shea Stadium** (29,832)	71–49	L1
121	August 17		Rockies	13–2	**Wendell** (5–4)	Yoshii (5–13)	—		**Shea Stadium** (42,697)	72–49	W1
122	August 18		@ Dodgers	5–3	**R. White** (5–6)	Adams (5–5)	**Benitez** (32)		Dodger Stadium (47,486)	73–49	W2
123	August 19		@ Dodgers	1–4	Park (12–8)	**Reed** (7–4)	—		Dodger Stadium (53,051)	73–50	L1
124	August 20		@ Dodgers	9–6	**Wendell** (6–4)	Adams (5–6)	**Benitez** (33)		Dodger Stadium (46,122)	74–50	W1
125	August 21		@ Padres	4–5 (10)	Hoffman (4–4)	**Cook** (6–3)	—		Qualcomm Stadium (21,234)	74–51	L1
126	August 22		@ Padres	1–16	Eaton (5–2)	**Mahomes** (4–2)	Erdos (2)		Qualcomm Stadium (24,919)	74–52	L2
127	August 23		@ Padres	4–1	**Leiter** (14–5)	Clement (11–12)	**Benitez** (34)		Qualcomm Stadium (26,376)	75–52	W1
128	August 25		Diamondbacks	13–3	**Reed** (8–4)	Johnson (16–5)	—	**Shea Stadium**	(38,237)	76–52	W2
129	August 26		Diamondbacks	1–5 (10)	Plesac (3–0)	**R. White** (5–7)	—		**Shea Stadium** (43,985)	76–53	L1
130	August 27		Diamondbacks	2–1	**Hampton** (13–7)	Reynoso (10–9)	**Benitez** (35)		**Shea Stadium** (42,277)	77–53	W1
131	August 28		Astros	4–2	**Rusch** (9–10)	Powell (1–1)	**Wendell** (1)		**Shea Stadium** (28,472)	78–53	W1
132	August 29		Astros	1–11	Miller (3–5)	**Leiter** (14–6)	—		**Shea Stadium** (39,967)	78–54	L1
133	August 30		Astros	1–0	**Reed** (9–4)	Holt (6–13)	**Benitez** (36)		**Shea Stadium** (42,507)	79–54	W1

September: 14–14 (Home: 7–4; Away: 7–10)

#	Date	Time (ET)	Opponent	Score	Win	Loss	Save	Time of Game	Location (Attendance)	Series	Box/ Streak
134	September 1		@ Cardinals	5–6	Veres (2–3)	**Mahomes** (4–3)	—		Busch Stadium (39,056)	79–55	L1
135	September 2		@ Cardinals	1–2	Kile (16–9)	**Hampton** (13–8)	—		Busch Stadium (41,483)	79–56	L2
136	September 3		@ Cardinals	3–4 (11)	Morris (3–3)	**White** (5–8)	—		Busch Stadium (42,133)	79–57	L3
137	September 4		@ Reds	2–6	Dessens (7–5)	**Leiter** (14–7)	—		Cinergy Field (26,571)	79–58	L4
138	September 5		@ Reds	3–2 (10)	**Wendell** (7–4)	Sullivan (2–6)	**Benitez** (37)		Cinergy Field (22,664)	80–58	W1
139	September 6		@ Reds	8–11	Riedling (2–0)	**Franco** (5–4)	Graves (25)		Cinergy Field (24,681)	80–59	L1
140	September 8		Phillies	0–2	Padilla (4–5)	**Hampton** (13–9)	Brantley (22)		**Shea Stadium** (38,808)	80–60	L2
141	September 9		Phillies	3–6	Person (8–5)	**Wendell** (7–5)	—		**Shea Stadium** (42,324)	80–61	L3
142	September 10		Phillies	3–0	**Leiter** (15–7)	Daal (3–18)	—		**Shea Stadium** (53,775)	81–61	W1
143	September 11		Brewers	2–8	Rigdon (4–4)	**Reed** (9–5)	—		**Shea Stadium** (21,797)	81–62	L1
144	September 12		Brewers	10–2	**B. J. Jones** (9–5)	Snyder (3–9)	—		**Shea Stadium** (22,570)	82–62	W1
145	September 13		Brewers	4–1 (10)	**Benitez** (4–4)	Acevedo (3–7)	—		**Shea Stadium** (22,510)	83–62	W2
146	September 14		@ Expos	10–4	**Rusch** (10–10)	Thurman (4–6)	—		Olympic Stadium (6,219)	84–62	W3
147	September 15		@ Expos	3–4	Vazquez (10–7)	**Wendell** (7–6)	Strickland (7)		Olympic Stadium (6,979)	84–63	L1
148	September 16		@ Expos	10–4	**Reed** (10–5)	Hermanson (11–14)	—		Olympic Stadium (9,045)	85–63	W1
149	September 17		@ Expos	0–5	Armas (6–8)	**B. J. Jones** (9–6)	—		Olympic Stadium (9,349)	85–64	L1
150	September 18		@ Braves	3–6	Maddux (18–8)	**Hampton** (13–10)	Rocker (23)		Turner Field (41,937)	85–65	L2
151	September 19		@ Braves	4–12	Ashby (11–12)	**Rusch** (10–11)	—		Turner Field (46,584)	85–66	L3
152	September 20		@ Braves	6–3	**Leiter** (16–7)	Glavine (19–9)	**Benitez** (38)		Turner Field (48,278)	86–66	W1
153	September 21		@ Phillies	5–6	Brantley (2–7)	**White** (5–9)	—		Veterans Stadium (17,769)	86–67	L1
154	September 22		@ Phillies	9–6	**B. J. Jones** (10–6)	Wolf (11–8)	**Benitez** (39)		Veterans Stadium (21,128)	87–67	W1
155	September 23		@ Phillies	7–3	**Hampton** (14–10)	Politte (3–3)	—		Veterans Stadium (22,570)	88–67	W2
156	September 24		@ Phillies	3–2	**Rusch** (11–11)	Chen (7–3)	**Benitez** (40)		Veterans Stadium (31,391)	89–67	W3
157	September 26		Braves	1–7	Burkett (10–6)	**Leiter** (16–8)	—		**Shea Stadium** (48,270)	89–68	L1
158	September 27		Braves	6–2	**Reed** (11–5)	Millwood (10–13)	—		**Shea Stadium** (48,858)	90–68	W1
159	September 28		Braves	8–2	**B. J. Jones** (11–6)	Maddux (19–9)	—		**Shea Stadium** (52,134)	91–68	W2
160	September 29		Expos	11–2	**Hampton** (15–10)	Thurman (4–9)	—		**Shea Stadium** (28,788)	92–68	W3
161	September 30		Expos	4–2	**Wendell** (8–6)	Vazquez (11–9)	**Benitez** (41)		**Shea Stadium** (39,468)	93–68	W4

October: 1–0 (Home: 1–0; Away: 0–0)

#	Date	Time (ET)	Opponent	Score	Win	Loss	Save	Time of Game	Location (Attendance)	Series	Box/ Streak
162	October 1		Expos	3–2 (13)	**Mahomes** (5–3)	Powell (0–3)	—		**Shea Stadium** (44,869)	94–68	W5

=== Detailed records ===
**National League**
Opponent	Home	Away	Total	Pct.	Runs scored	Runs allowed
**NL East**
**New York Mets**	—	—	—	—	—	—
	**0–0**	**0–0**	**0–0**	–	**0**	**0**
**NL Central**
	**0–0**	**0–0**	**0–0**	–	**0**	**0**
**NL West**
	**0–0**	**0–0**	**0–0**	–	**0**	**0**

**American League**
Opponent	Home	Away	Total	Pct.	Runs scored	Runs allowed
**AL East**
New York Yankees	1–2	1–2	2–4	.333	24	25
	**1–2**	**1–2**	**2–4**	**.333**	**24**	**25**

== Playoffs ==
=== Game log ===
Legend
Mets Win	Mets Loss
Bold = Mets team member

2000 Postseason game log: 8–6 (Home: 5–4; Away: 3–3)
NL Division Series vs. San Francisco Giants 3–1 (Home: 2–0; Away: 1–1)

#	Date	Time (ET)	Opponent	Score	Win	Loss	Save	Time of Game	Location (Attendance)	Series	Box/ Streak
1	October 4	4:07 p.m. EDT	@ Giants	1–5	Hernández (1–0)	**Hampton** (0–1)	—	3:06	Pacific Bell Park (40,430)	SFN 1–0	L1
2	October 5	8:07 p.m. EDT	@ Giants	5–4 (10)	**Benítez** (1–0)	Rodríguez (0–1)	**Franco** (1)	3:41	Pacific Bell Park (40,430)	TIE 1–1	W1
3	October 7	4:18 p.m. EDT	Giants	3–2 (13)	**White** (1–0)	Fultz (0–1)	—	5:22	**Shea Stadium** (56,270)	NYN 2–1	W2
4	October 8	4:07 p.m. EDT	Giants	4–0	**B. J. Jones** (1–0)	Gardner (0–1)	—	2:48	**Shea Stadium** (56,245)	NYN 3–1	W3

NL Championship Series vs. St. Louis Cardinals 4–1 (Home: 2–1; Away: 2–0)

#	Date	Time (ET)	Opponent	Score	Win	Loss	Save	Time of Game	Location (Attendance)	Series	Box/ Streak
1	October 11	8:18 p.m. EDT	@ Cardinals	6–2	**Hampton** (1–0)	Kile (0–1)	—	3:08	Busch Stadium (52,255)	NYN 1–0	W1
2	October 12	8:18 p.m. EDT	@ Cardinals	6–5	**Wendell** (1–0)	Timlin (0–1)	**Benítez** (1)	3:59	Busch Stadium (52,250)	NYN 2–0	W2
3	October 14	4:21 p.m. EDT	Cardinals	2–8	Benes (1–0)	**Reed** (0–1)	—	3:23	**Shea Stadium** (55,693)	NYN 2–1	L1
4	October 15	8:02 p.m. EDT	Cardinals	10–6	**Rusch** (1–0)	Kile (0–2)	—	3:14	**Shea Stadium** (55,665)	NYN 3–1	W1
5	October 16	8:22 p.m. EDT	Cardinals	7–0	**Hampton** (2–0)	Hentgen (0–1)	—	3:17	**Shea Stadium** (55,695)	NYN 4–1	W2

World Series vs. New York Yankees 1–4 (Home: 1–2; Away: 0–2)

#	Date	Time (ET)	Opponent	Score	Win	Loss	Save	Time of Game	Location (Attendance)	Series	Box/ Streak
1	October 21	8:13 p.m. EDT	@ Yankees	3–4 (12)	Stanton (1–0)	**Wendell** (0–1)	—	4:51	Yankee Stadium (55,913)	NYA 1–0	L1
2	October 22	8:05 p.m. EDT	@ Yankees	5–6	Roger Clemens (1–0)	**Hampton** (0–1)	—	3:30	Yankee Stadium (56,059)	NYA 2–0	L2
3	October 24	8:37 p.m. EDT	Yankees	4–2	**Franco** (1–0)	Hernandez (0–1)	**Benítez** (1)	3:39	**Shea Stadium** (55,299)	NYA 2–1	W1
4	October 25	8:27 p.m. EDT	Yankees	2–3	Nelson (1–0)	**B. J. Jones** (0–1)	Rivera (1)	3:20	**Shea Stadium** (55,290)	NYA 3–1	L1
5	October 26	8:28 p.m. EDT	Yankees	2–4	Stanton (2–0)	**Leiter** (0–1)	Rivera (2)	3:32	**Shea Stadium** (55,292)	NYA 4–1	L2

=== Playoff rosters ===
Playoff rosters
National League Division Series

- Pitchers: 49 Armando Benítez 27 Dennis Cook 45 John Franco 32 Mike Hampton 28 Bobby Jones 22 Al Leiter 35 Rick Reed 48 Glendon Rusch 99 Turk Wendell 51 Rick White
- Catchers: 31 Mike Piazza 7 Todd Pratt
- Infielders: 20 Kurt Abbott 13 Edgardo Alfonzo 17 Mike Bordick 19 Lenny Harris 4 Robin Ventura 9 Todd Zeile
- Outfielders: 50 Benny Agbayani 16 Derek Bell 18 Darryl Hamilton 47 Joe McEwing 44 Jay Payton 6 Timo Pérez

National League Championship Series

- Pitchers: 49 Armando Benítez 27 Dennis Cook 45 John Franco 32 Mike Hampton 28 Bobby Jones 22 Al Leiter 35 Rick Reed 48 Glendon Rusch 99 Turk Wendell 51 Rick White
- Catchers: 31 Mike Piazza
- Infielders: 20 Kurt Abbott 13 Edgardo Alfonzo 17 Mike Bordick 15 Matt Franco 19 Lenny Harris 4 Robin Ventura 9 Todd Zeile
- Outfielders: 50 Benny Agbayani 18 Darryl Hamilton 47 Joe McEwing 44 Jay Payton 6 Timo Pérez 33 Bubba Trammell

World Series

- Pitchers: 49 Armando Benítez 27 Dennis Cook 45 John Franco 32 Mike Hampton 28 Bobby Jones 22 Al Leiter 35 Rick Reed 48 Glendon Rusch 99 Turk Wendell 51 Rick White
- Catchers: 31 Mike Piazza 7 Todd Pratt
- Infielders: 20 Kurt Abbott 13 Edgardo Alfonzo 17 Mike Bordick 15 Matt Franco 19 Lenny Harris 4 Robin Ventura 9 Todd Zeile
- Outfielders: 50 Benny Agbayani 18 Darryl Hamilton 47 Joe McEwing 44 Jay Payton 6 Timo Pérez 33 Bubba Trammell

== Player stats ==
= Indicates team leader

=== Batting ===
==== Starters by position ====
Note: Pos = Position; G = Games played; AB = At bats; H = Hits; Avg. = Batting average; HR = Home runs; RBI = Runs batted in

Pos	Player	G	AB	H	Avg.	HR	RBI
C	Mike Piazza	136	482	156	.324	38	113
1B	Todd Zeile	153	544	146	.268	22	79
2B	Edgardo Alfonzo	150	544	176	.324	25	94
SS	Mike Bordick	56	192	50	.260	4	21
3B	Robin Ventura	141	469	109	.232	24	84
LF	Benny Agbayani	119	350	101	.289	15	60
CF	Jay Payton	149	488	142	.291	17	62
RF	Derek Bell	144	546	145	.266	18	69

==== Other batters ====
Note: G = Games played; AB = At bats; H = Hits; Avg. = Batting average; HR = Home runs; RBI = Runs batted in

Player	G	AB	H	Avg.	HR	RBI
Melvin Mora	79	215	56	.260	6	30
Todd Pratt	80	160	44	.275	8	25
Kurt Abbott	79	157	34	.217	6	12
Joe McEwing	87	153	34	.222	2	19
Lenny Harris	76	138	42	.304	3	13
Matt Franco	101	134	32	.239	2	14
Rey Ordóñez	45	133	25	.188	0	9
Darryl Hamilton	43	105	29	.276	1	6
Rickey Henderson	31	96	21	.219	0	2
Jon Nunnally	48	74	14	.189	2	6
Bubba Trammell	36	56	13	.232	3	12
Timo Pérez	24	49	14	.286	1	3
Jason Tyner	13	41	8	.195	0	5
Mark Johnson	21	22	4	.182	1	6
Jorge Toca	8	7	3	.429	0	4
Jorge Velandia	15	7	0	.000	0	0
David Lamb	7	5	1	.200	0	0
Vance Wilson	4	4	0	.000	0	0
Mike Kinkade	2	2	0	.000	0	0
Ryan McGuire	1	2	0	.000	0	0

=== Pitching ===
==== Starting pitchers ====
Note: G = Games pitched; IP = Innings pitched; W = Wins; L = Losses; ERA = Earned run average; SO = Strikeouts

Player	G	IP	W	L	ERA	SO
Mike Hampton	33	217.2	15	10	3.14	151
Al Leiter	31	208.0	16	8	3.20	200
Glendon Rusch	31	190.2	11	11	4.01	157
Rick Reed	30	184.0	11	5	4.11	121
Bobby J. Jones	27	154.2	11	6	5.06	85
Dennis Springer	2	11.1	0	1	8.74	5
Bill Pulsipher	2	6.2	0	2	12.15	7

==== Other pitchers ====
Note: G = Games pitched; IP = Innings pitched; W = Wins; L = Losses; ERA = Earned run average; SO = Strikeouts

Player	G	IP	W	L	ERA	SO
Grant Roberts	4	7.0	0	0	11.57	6

==== Relief pitchers ====
Note: G = Games pitched; IP = Innings pitched; W = Wins; L = Losses; SV = Saves; ERA = Earned run average; SO = Strikeouts

Player	G	IP	W	L	SV	ERA	SO
Armando Benítez	76	76.0	4	4	41	2.61	106
Pat Mahomes	53	94.0	5	3	0	5.46	76
Turk Wendell	77	82.2	8	6	1	3.59	73
Dennis Cook	68	59.0	6	3	2	5.34	53
John Franco	62	55.2	5	4	4	3.40	56
Rich Rodriguez	32	37.0	0	1	0	7.78	18
Rick White	22	28.1	2	3	1	3.81	20
Bobby Jones	11	21.2	0	1	0	4.15	20
Eric Cammack	8	10.0	0	0	0	6.30	9
Jim Mann	2	2.2	0	0	0	10.13	0
Jerrod Riggan	1	2.0	0	0	0	0.00	1
Derek Bell	1	1.0	0	0	0	36.00	0

== Awards and honors ==
- Mike Hampton, Pitcher, National League Championship Series Most Valuable Player
- Al Leiter, Pitcher, Roberto Clemente Award

All-Star Game

- Mike Piazza, Catcher, Starter
- Al Leiter, Pitcher, Reserve
- Edgardo Alfonzo, Second Base, Reserve

== Farm system ==
Level	Team	League	Manager
AAA	Norfolk Tides	International League	John Gibbons
AA	Binghamton Mets	Eastern League	Doug Davis
A	St. Lucie Mets	Florida State League	Dave Engle
A	Capital City Bombers	South Atlantic League	John Stephenson
A-Short Season	Pittsfield Mets	New York–Penn League	Tony Tijerina
Rookie	Kingsport Mets	Appalachian League	Edgar Alfonzo
