= Rick Ankiel =

American baseball player (born 1979)

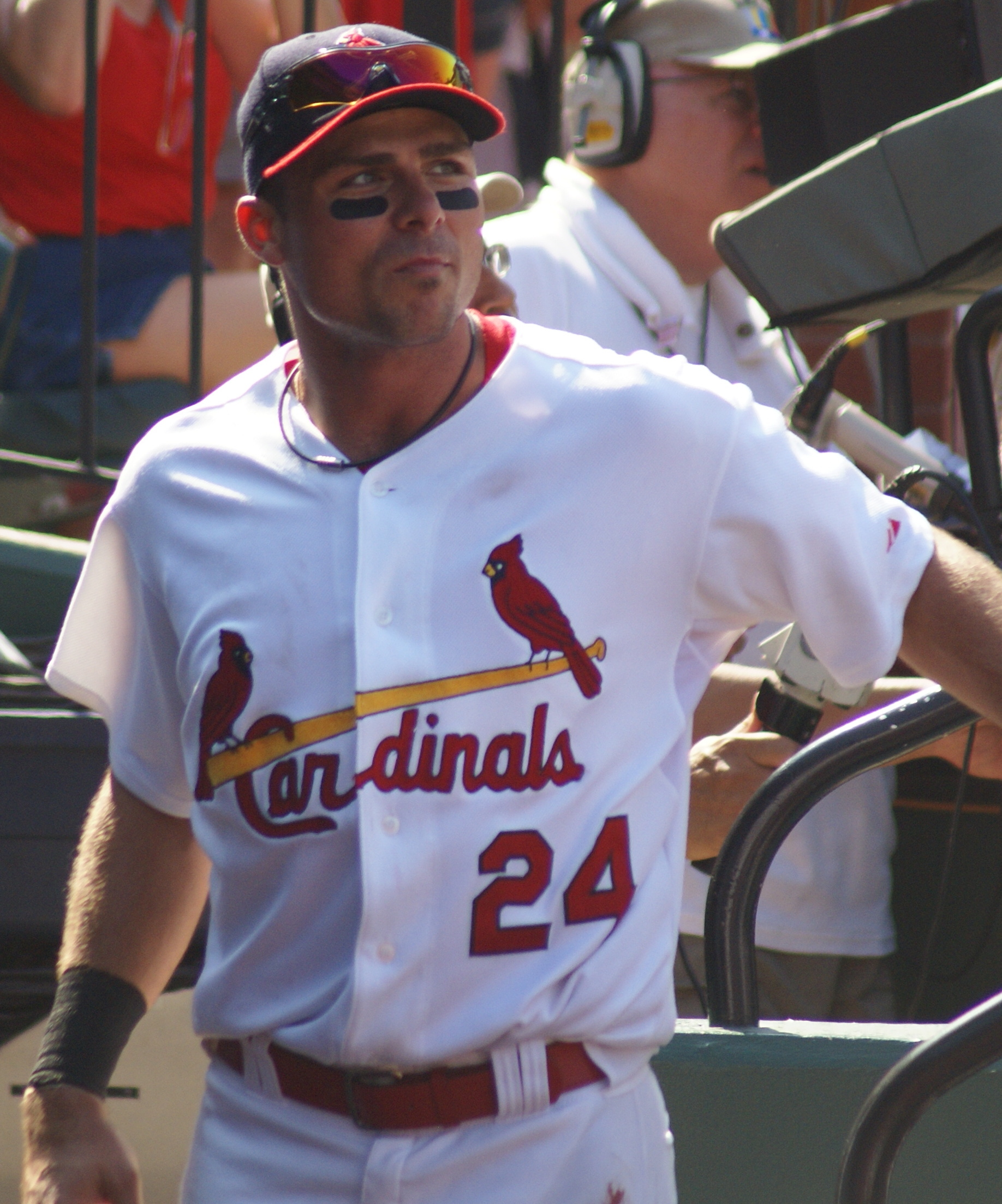
- Ankiel with the St. Louis Cardinals in 2008
- Center fielder / Pitcher
- Born: July 19, 1979 (age 47); Fort Pierce, Florida, U.S.
- Batted: Left Threw: Left

MLB debut
- August 23, 1999, for the St. Louis Cardinals

Last MLB appearance
- June 8, 2013, for the New York Mets

MLB statistics
- Batting average: .240
- Home runs: 76
- Runs batted in: 251
- Win–loss record: 13–10
- Earned run average: 3.90
- Strikeouts: 269
- Stats at Baseball Reference

Teams
- St. Louis Cardinals (1999–2001, 2004, 2007–2009); Kansas City Royals (2010); Atlanta Braves (2010); Washington Nationals (2011–2012); Houston Astros (2013); New York Mets (2013)
Medals
Men's baseball
Representing United States
World Junior Baseball Championship
Bronze medal – third place	1996 Sancti Spíritus	Team

Richard Alexander Ankiel (/ˈæŋkiːl/; born July 19, 1979) is an American former professional baseball center fielder and pitcher. He spent most of his Major League Baseball (MLB) career with the St. Louis Cardinals, but also played for the Kansas City Royals, Atlanta Braves, Washington Nationals, Houston Astros, and New York Mets.

Ankiel was a pitcher with the Cardinals from 1999 until 2001 when he found himself unable to throw strikes consistently. After trying to regain his pitching form in the minor leagues and briefly returning to the majors in 2004, he switched to the outfield in early 2005. For two and a half years, he honed his skills as a hitter and fielder in the Cardinals' minor-league system. He returned to the Cardinals on August 9, 2007. As a Cardinal until 2009, Ankiel hit 47 home runs as an outfielder and two as a pitcher. After the 2009 season, Ankiel became a free agent. Subsequently, he was signed by the Royals and later was traded to the Braves. Ankiel became the first player after Babe Ruth to win at least 10 games as a pitcher and also hit at least 70 home runs. Ankiel is also the only player other than Ruth and Shohei Ohtani to both start a postseason game as a pitcher and hit a home run in the postseason as a position player.

Writing for Deadspin, journalist Barry Petchesky suggested that Ankiel's change of position, and the fact that he played for six teams in a five-season span, represented "one of the stranger careers in baseball history."

== Early life and amateur career ==
Ankiel was born to Denise and Richard Ankiel Sr. His father worked various odd jobs, was arrested 14 times and convicted 6 times by the time Ankiel was an adult. He described his father as very tough on him, making him run wind sprints if he swung at bad pitches in Little League.

Ankiel attended Port St. Lucie High School in Florida, where he went 11–1 with a 0.47 earned run average (ERA) during his senior season, striking out 162 batters in 74 innings pitched, and was named the High School Player of the Year by USA Today in 1997.

== Professional career ==
The St. Louis Cardinals selected Ankiel in the second round of the 1997 Major League Baseball draft. He received a $2.5 million signing bonus. In 1998, he was voted the best pitching prospect in both the Carolina and Midwest League, and was the Carolina League's All-Star starting pitcher, Baseball America's first-team Minor League All-Star starting pitcher, and the Cardinals' Minor League Player of the Year. That year, he led all minor league pitchers in strikeouts with 222.

In 1999, Ankiel was named the Minor League Player of the Year by both Baseball America and USA Today. He was also Texas League All-Star pitcher, Double-A All-Star starting pitcher, Cardinals Minor League Player of the Year, and Baseball America First Team Minor League All-Star starting pitcher.

=== 1999 and 2000 seasons ===
Ankiel debuted in 1999 in Montreal against the Expos. He pitched his first full season in 2000 at the age of 20 (second youngest player in the league), posting an 11–7 record, a 3.50 ERA (tenth in the league), and 194 strikeouts (seventh in the league) in 30 games started. Ankiel threw a 94- to 97-mph fastball, a heavy sinker, and a fall-off-the-table curveball that was his main strikeout pitch. He struck out batters at a rate of 9.98 strikeouts per nine innings (second in the National League only to Randy Johnson), and allowed only 7.05 hits per nine innings (second only to Chan Ho Park). He came in second (to the Atlanta Braves' Rafael Furcal) in the NL Rookie of the Year voting. He received The Sporting News Rookie Pitcher of the Year Award.

=== 2000 postseason ===
The Cardinals won the National League Central Division championship in 2000. Injuries to other pitchers left Ankiel and Darryl Kile as the only fully healthy starters left on the roster. Cardinals manager Tony La Russa chose Ankiel to start game one of the National League Division Series against veteran pitcher Greg Maddux of the Braves. To shield Ankiel from media pressure, La Russa had Kile answer questions to the media as if to start game one, and afterwards informed the media that Ankiel was starting.

In game one, Ankiel did not allow a run through the first two innings. His performance suddenly deteriorated in the third. He allowed four runs on two hits, four walks and throwing five wild pitches before being removed with two outs. Despite Ankiel facing eight batters and throwing 35 pitches, the Cardinals won the game. Ankiel shrugged off the event, joking that he set a record for wild pitches. He was the first pitcher to throw five wild pitches in an inning since Bert Cunningham of the Players' League in 1890. Ankiel set the record for wild pitches in a postseason career and postseason inning.

In his next start, game two of the National League Championship Series against the New York Mets, Ankiel was removed in the first inning after throwing 33 pitches, five of which went past catcher Eli Marrero (only two were official wild pitches, as no runners were on base for the others), and the first of which sailed over the head of Mets' hitter Timo Perez. Ankiel appeared again in the seventh inning of game five facing four hitters, walking two and throwing two more wild pitches. The Cardinals lost the series four games to one to the Mets.

The source of Ankiel's problems were unknown, but speculated to be psychological. His father had been sent to federal prison, and his parents were divorced during the 2000 season. His loss of control, often called the yips, has been compared to pitcher Steve Blass, renowned as having pinpoint control until he too became unable to consistently throw strikes for unknown reasons. A section of a book about Cardinals manager Tony La Russa, Three Nights in August, details Ankiel's rise to the big leagues and loss of control as a pitcher in 2000–2001. La Russa has stated that putting Ankiel into Game 1 of the 2000 NLDS was "a decision that perhaps haunts him more than any he has ever made."

=== Control issues (2001–2004) ===
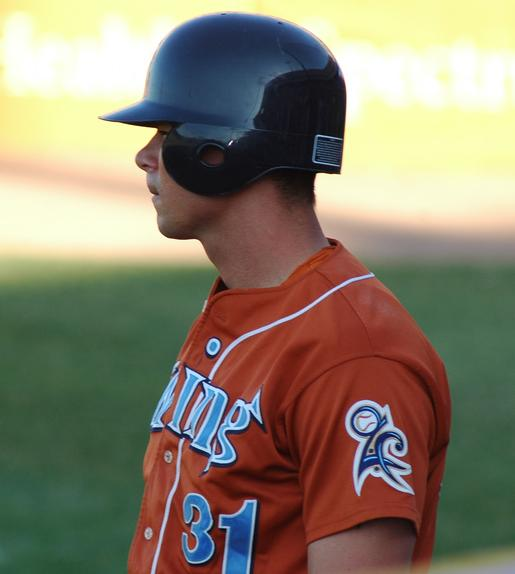
Ankiel with the Swing of the Quad Cities in 2005

Ankiel returned to the majors in 2001 but again had issues controlling his pitches, walking 25 batters and throwing five wild pitches in 24 innings, and was sent down to Triple-A. His problems in the minors became dramatic. In 4 1/3 innings at the Triple-A level, Ankiel walked 17 batters and threw 12 wild pitches, accumulating a 20.77 ERA. He was demoted all the way down to the Rookie League Johnson City Cardinals, where he was successful as both a starting pitcher, with a 1.33 ERA in 14 starts, and a designated hitter, sporting a .638 slugging percentage with 10 home runs and 35 RBIs in 118 plate appearances. He was voted Rookie Level Player of the Year, Appalachian League All-Star left-handed pitcher, Rookie League All-Star starting pitcher, Appalachian League Pitcher of the Year, and Appalachian League All-Star designated hitter.

In 2002, Ankiel sat out the season due to a left elbow sprain, and was not cleared to throw until December. He returned to the minors in 2003, posting a 6.29 ERA in 10 starts before undergoing season-ending ulnar collateral ligament reconstruction (Tommy John surgery) for his left elbow in July. In 54 1/3 innings, he walked 49 batters and threw 10 wild pitches.

Ankiel returned to the majors in September 2004, posting a 5.40 ERA in five relief appearances. Ankiel's control problems appeared to be gone, as he walked just one while striking out nine in ten innings. In the minors, he walked only two batters in 23 2/3 innings, while striking out 23. He pitched in the winter Puerto Rican Professional Baseball League, where he felt a "twinge" in his pitching elbow.

=== Switch to the outfield and knee injury (2005–2006) ===
On March 9, 2005, Ankiel announced that he was switching to the outfield, after a spring training scrimmage in which he threw only three strikes out of 23 pitches. In the minors in 2005, he continued to be a powerful batter, slugging over .500 in both Single-A and Double-A, with a combined 21 home runs in 55 games. He had a strong arm in the outfield as well, with nine outfield assists.

In 2006, Ankiel was invited to spring training by the Cardinals as an outfielder, with a slim chance to make the team as a reserve player. His fielding impressed scouts and managers, and he had shown flashes of power hitting in the minors. However, he injured his left knee in February and had season-ending surgery on May 26.

=== 2007 season ===
Ankiel was invited to the Cardinals' 2007 spring training and began that season with the Triple-A Memphis Redbirds. On May 28, 2007, he hit two home runs in a game against the Round Rock Express. He also hit an RBI double and made an over-the-shoulder catch in deep center field that saved two runs.

Ankiel was named a starting outfielder for the 2007 Triple-A All-Star Game. Through August 8, he had 32 home runs, 89 RBIs, and was hitting .267, including a three-home run performance on June 16 against the Iowa Cubs. He was the home run leader in the Pacific Coast League, and tied for second in RBIs. Defensively, Ankiel had seven errors in 95 games.

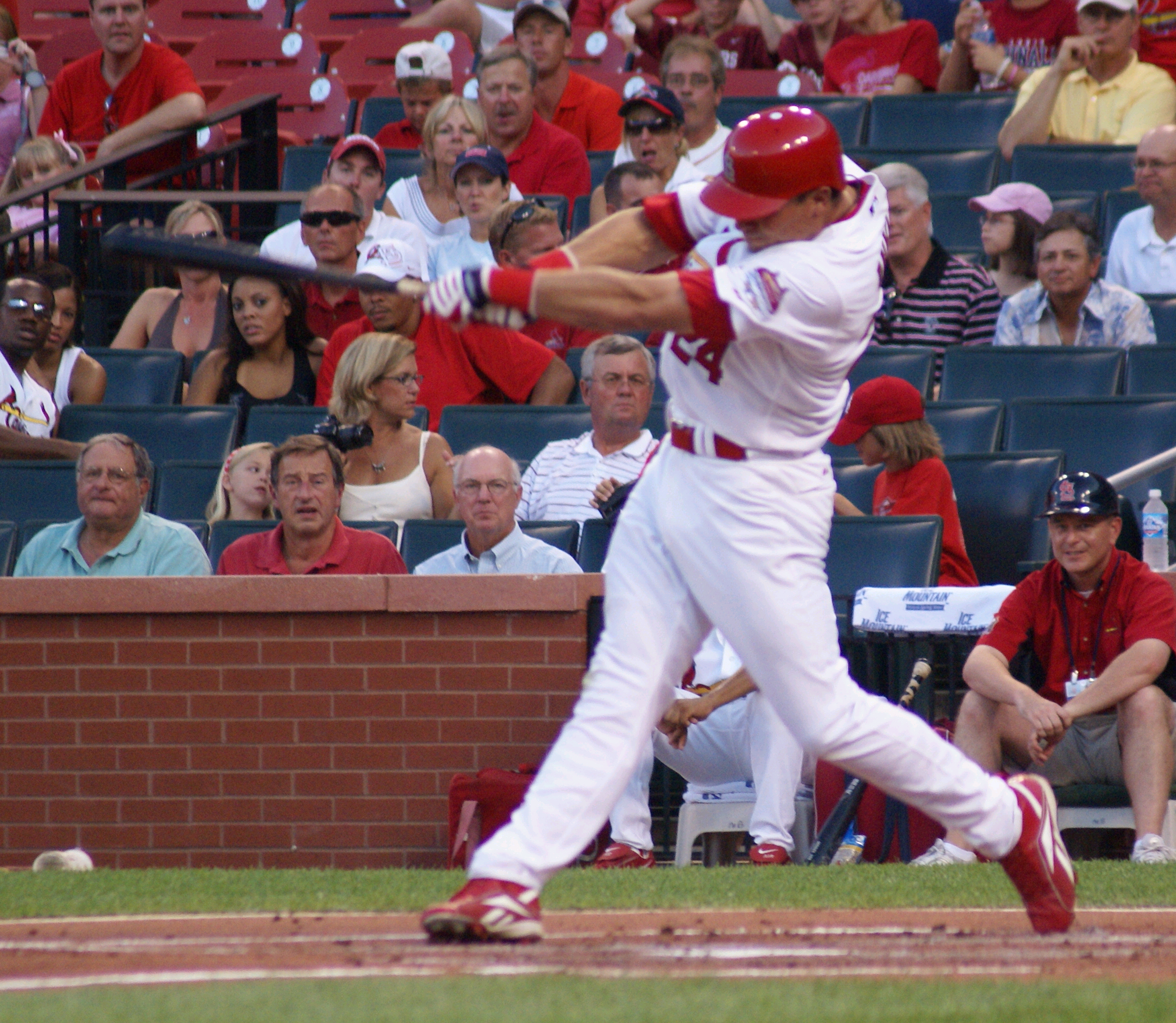
Ankiel batting for the St. Louis Cardinals in 2007

==== Return to the majors ====
On August 9, 2007, the Cardinals promoted Ankiel from Memphis after a roster spot was vacated by Scott Spiezio's departure. In his first game, Ankiel batted second and played right field. In his first at bat, he received a prolonged standing ovation from the St. Louis crowd. During the seventh inning, he hit a three-run home run off Doug Brocail to right field to help the Cardinals defeat the San Diego Padres, 5–0. It was his first home run in the majors since April 2000 (as a pitcher), and made him the first player since Clint Hartung (1947) to hit his first major league home run as a pitcher and then hit a home run as a position player. The player before Hartung who accomplished this was Babe Ruth. After the game, Tony La Russa said that his only happier moment as a Cardinal was when they won the 2006 World Series. Two days later, against the Dodgers on August 11, Ankiel drew three standing ovations. He had three hits, including two home runs and three RBIs and made a spectacular catch in right field.

Ankiel's comeback led syndicated columnist Charles Krauthammer to write on August 17:

His return after seven years—if only three days long—is the stuff of legend. Made even more perfect by the timing: Just two days after Barry Bonds sets a synthetic home run record in San Francisco, the Natural returns to St. Louis.

— Charles Krauthammer, Townhall

Ankiel hit his first grand slam in St. Louis against left-hander Eddie Guardado of the Cincinnati Reds on August 31 with the team trailing, 4–3, for an 8–5 win that broke a tie with Red Schoendienst for La Russa for most wins by a Cardinals manager. In a home game against the Pittsburgh Pirates on September 6, he recorded his second two–home run game of the season with a 3-for-4, 7-RBI effort, along with an over-the-shoulder catch in deep right field. On September 23, Ankiel had his first walk-off hit, a two-run triple to beat the Astros 4–3 on the last Sunday Night Baseball game of the season.

Ankiel finished the year with a .285 batting average, 11 home runs, 39 RBIs, a .328 on-base percentage, .535 slugging percentage, and an .863 OPS in 47 games and 172 at-bats. The Cardinals, coming off a 2006 World Series title and three consecutive division championships, finished 2007 with a 78–84 record and missed the playoffs.

Following the season, Ankiel admitted to using human growth hormone (HGH) but said he was following doctor's orders. HGH was not banned by Major League Baseball until 2005. An MLB investigation concluded that there was insufficient evidence that Ankiel violated the league's drug policy.

=== 2008 season ===
Ankiel helped the Cardinals defeat the Colorado Rockies on May 6 by recording two outfield assists and a home run to propel St. Louis to a 6–5 victory. Ankiel, on both assists, threw the ball from deep center field to Troy Glaus at third on the fly. He finished 2008 with a .264 batting average, 25 home runs, and 71 runs batted in.

=== 2009 season ===
Ankiel was the Cardinals' leading hitter in spring training but struggled at the plate when the season started. During a May 4 game against the Philadelphia Phillies, Ankiel collided with the outfield wall and was carried off the field. The injury was reported as whiplash, and Ankiel was placed on the disabled list on May 7. He was re-activated on May 24. Ankiel platooned with Colby Rasmus for much of the remainder of the year and finished the season with 11 home runs, 38 RBI, and a .231 batting average.

=== 2010 season ===
==== Kansas City Royals ====
On January 5, 2010, Ankiel signed a one-year, $3.25 million contract with the Kansas City Royals. He began the season as the Royals' starting center fielder but was placed on the disabled list on May 5 with a strained right quadriceps after playing sparingly beginning on April 24. He was activated on July 23, and replaced an injured David DeJesus midway through the game in center field.

==== Atlanta Braves ====
On July 31, Ankiel and reliever Kyle Farnsworth were traded to the Atlanta Braves for Jesse Chavez, Gregor Blanco, and Tim Collins.

On October 8, in the second game of the 2010 NLDS against the San Francisco Giants, Ankiel hit his first career postseason home run into McCovey Cove off Giants reliever Ramón Ramírez in the top of the 11th inning, leading the Braves to a 5–4 win. Ankiel joined Barry Bonds as the only players to hit a ball into the cove in the postseason. In a television interview after the game, Ankiel called the home run "the pinnacle of anything I've ever done." He finished the 2010 season with a .232 batting average, 6 home runs, and 24 RBI in 74 games.

On November 2, the Braves declined Ankiel's club option, making him a free agent.

=== Washington Nationals (2011–2012) ===
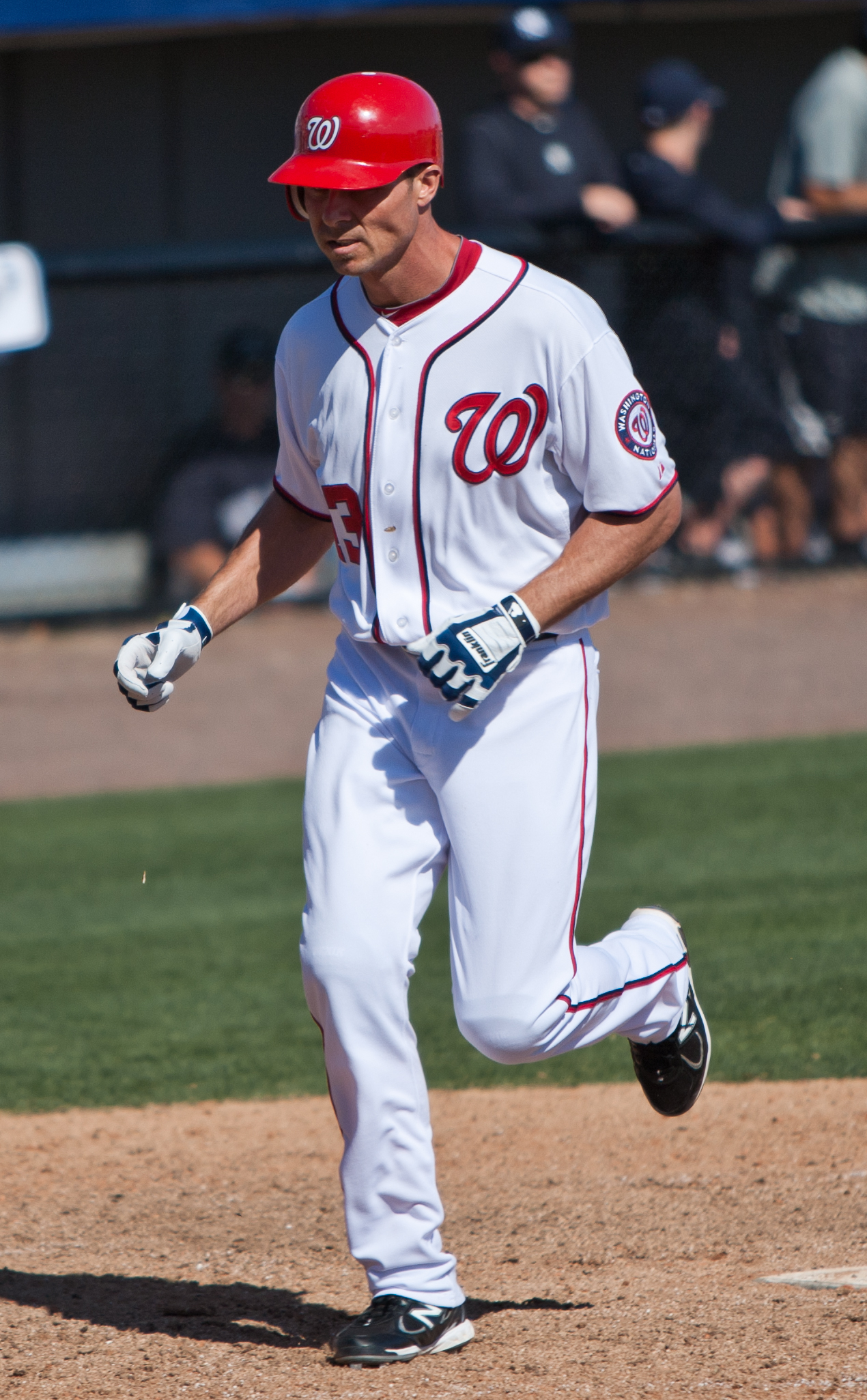
Ankiel with the Washington Nationals in 2011 spring training

On December 20, 2010, the Washington Nationals signed him to a one-year, $1.5 million contract.

Ankiel played in 122 games for the Nationals in 2011, hitting .239 with 9 home runs and 37 RBIs while platooning in center field with Roger Bernadina. He had a .996 fielding percentage for the season, committing one error in 113 games in the outfield.

The Nationals re-signed Ankiel to a one-year, $1.25 million minor league deal for 2012. He began the season on the disabled list, rehabbing in the minors. Once promoted, his role was limited as a backup outfielder. In 68 games, he hit .228 with five home runs and 15 RBIs in 158 at-bats. He started 37 games in center field and played 62 total games in center field. On July 19, as Nationals closer Drew Storen was added to the roster, Ankiel was designated for assignment by the Nationals to make room. On July 27, Ankiel was released by the Nationals.

=== 2013 season ===
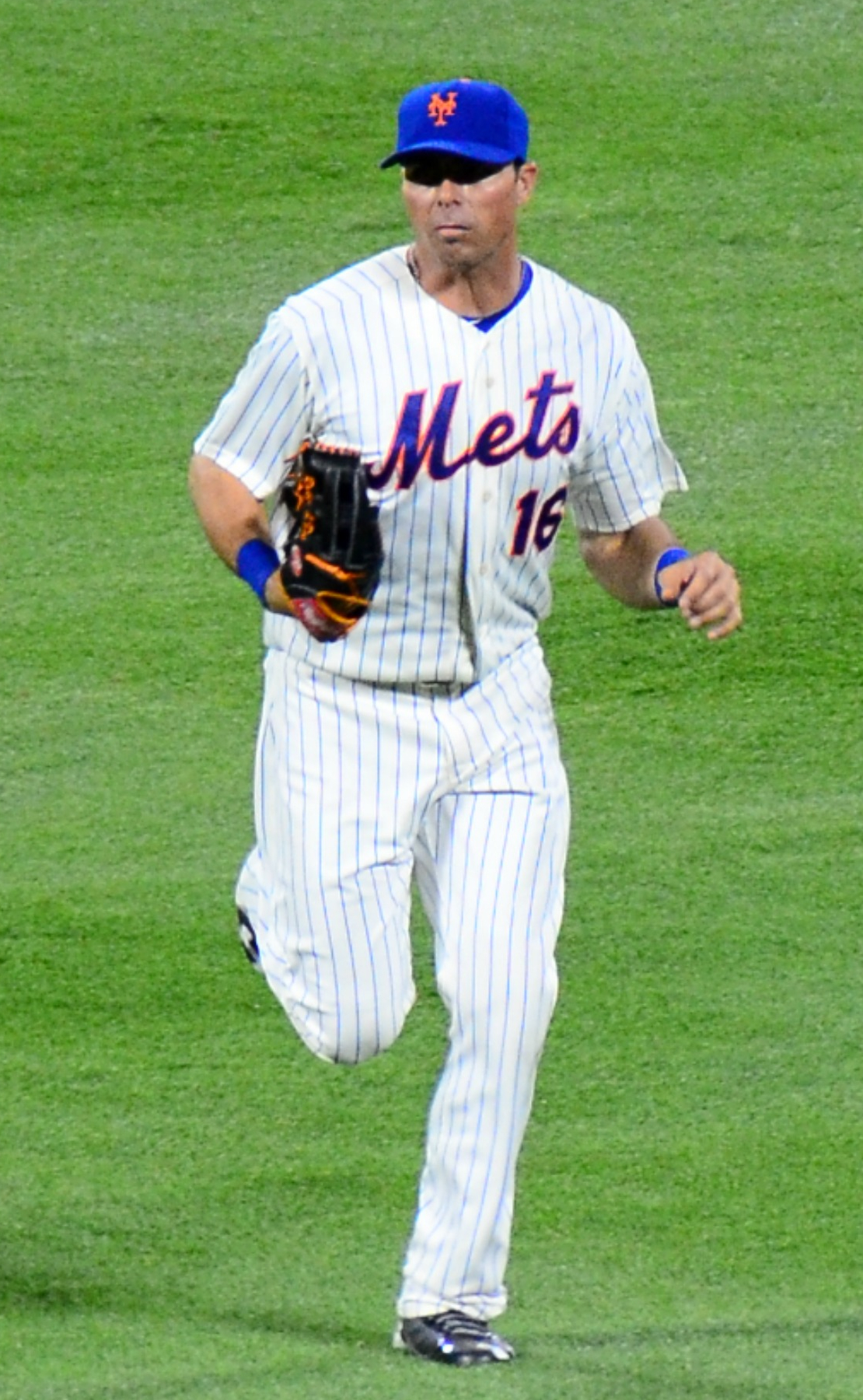
Ankiel with the Mets in 2013

On January 17, 2013, the Houston Astros signed Ankiel with an invite to spring training as a non-roster invitee. On March 31, Ankiel homered in the Astros' regular season opener against the Texas Rangers in Houston; with the Astros switching from the National League to the American League that season, his was the first AL home run in team history. He was designated for assignment on May 6 and released on May 9.

On May 13, the New York Mets signed Ankiel and immediately placed him into their starting lineup. He collected two hits, including a two-run homer, against the Cardinals in St. Louis on May 15.

His offensive production regressed. Following an 0-for-4, three-strikeout performance against the Miami Marlins on June 8, giving him a combined 60 strikeouts in 128 at-bats for the season, Ankiel was designated for assignment by the Mets. He became a free agent on June 13. In 45 games with the Astros and Mets, he batted .188 with 7 home runs, 18 RBI, and a .422 slugging percentage.

=== Retirement ===
Ankiel announced his retirement from Major League Baseball on March 5, 2014.

On January 8, 2015, the Washington Nationals announced that they had hired Ankiel as a "Life Skills Coordinator." In this role, Ankiel mentored players both at the major league level as well as in the Nationals' farm system.

In April 2017, Ankiel's memoir, The Phenomenon: Pressure, The Yips, and the Pitch that Changed My Life, was published.

In August 2018, Ankiel stated that he was "toying with" the idea of possibly pitching in professional baseball again. Later that month, Ankiel announced that he was planning a return to Major League Baseball for the 2019 season as a pitcher. In October, he underwent "primary repair" surgery, an alternative to Tommy John surgery, in his pitching elbow. Ankiel officially ended his comeback attempt on July 30, 2019. He was eligible to be elected into the Hall of Fame in 2019, but received no votes in his only year on the ballot.

After retiring, Ankiel became a commentator and studio analyst for Bally Sports Midwest, frequently joining Dan McLaughlin to call Cardinals games.

== Personal life ==
Ankiel's father was sentenced to six years in federal prison for drug smuggling in March 2000.

Ankiel lives in Jupiter, Florida with wife, Lory. They have two sons.

== See also ==
- List of Major League Baseball players named in the Mitchell Report
- Two-way player#Baseball
