= 2000 National League Division Series =

American baseball games

Teams
Team (Wins)		Manager	Season
New York Mets (3)		Bobby Valentine	94–68 (.580), GB: 1
San Francisco Giants (1)		Dusty Baker	97–65 (.599), GA: 11
- Dates: October 4–8
- Television: ESPN (Games 1, 4); Fox (Games 2–3)
- TV announcers: Jon Miller and Joe Morgan (Games 1, 4); Thom Brennaman and Bob Brenly (Game 2); Joe Buck and Tim McCarver (Game 3)
- Radio: ESPN
- Radio announcers: Charley Steiner and Dave Campbell
- Umpires: Games 1–2: Jeff Kellogg, Gary Cederstrom, Ed Montague, Dan Morrison, Larry Young, Ted Barrett; Games 3–4: Rich Rieker, Terry Craft, Jerry Crawford, Brian Gorman, Rocky Roe, Mike DiMuro

Teams
Team (Wins)		Manager	Season
St. Louis Cardinals (3)		Tony La Russa	95–67 (.586), GA: 10
Atlanta Braves (0)		Bobby Cox	95–67 (.586), GA: 1
- Dates: October 3–7
- Television: ESPN
- TV announcers: Jon Miller, Buck Martinez (Games 1, 3), and Joe Morgan (Game 2)
- Radio: ESPN
- Radio announcers: Wayne Hagin and Mark Grace
- Umpires: Games 1–2: Rich Rieker, Terry Craft, Jerry Crawford, Brian Gorman, Rocky Roe, Mike DiMuro; Game 3: Jeff Kellogg, Gary Cederstrom, Ed Montague, Dan Morrison, Larry Young, Ted Barrett

The 2000 National League Division Series (NLDS) consisted of two best-of-five playoff series on the National League side in Major League Baseball’s (MLB) 2000 postseason, began on Tuesday, October 3, and ended on Sunday, October 8, with the champions of the three NL divisions—along with a "wild card" team—participating in two series.

Under MLB's playoff format, no two teams from the same division were matched up in the Division Series, regardless of whether their records would normally indicate such a matchup. Home field advantage went to the team with the better regular-season record with the exception of the wild card team, which defers home field advantage regardless of record. The matchups were:

- (1) San Francisco Giants (NL West champions) vs. (4) New York Mets (Wild Card qualifier): Mets won the series, 3–1.
- (2) St. Louis Cardinals (NL Central champions) vs. (3) Atlanta Braves (NL East champions): Cardinals won the series, 3–0.

The higher seeded team in each series hosts Games 1, 2, and 5 (if necessary), and the lower seeded team hosts Games 3 and 4 (if necessary).

The Cardinals and Mets went on to meet in the NL Championship Series (NLCS). The Mets beat the Cardinals four games to one to advance to the 2000 World Series, where they would lose to the American League champion New York Yankees in five games.

== Matchups ==
=== San Francisco Giants vs. New York Mets ===
New York won the series, 3–1.

Game	Date	Score	Location	Time	Attendance
1	October 4	New York Mets – 1, San Francisco Giants – 5	Pacific Bell Park	3:06	40,430
2	October 5	New York Mets – 5, San Francisco Giants – 4 (10)	Pacific Bell Park	3:41	40,430
3	October 7	San Francisco Giants – 2, New York Mets – 3 (13)	Shea Stadium	5:22	56,270
4	October 8	San Francisco Giants – 0, New York Mets – 4	Shea Stadium	2:48	56,245

=== St. Louis Cardinals vs. Atlanta Braves ===
St. Louis won the series, 3–0.

Game	Date	Score	Location	Time	Attendance
1	October 3	Atlanta Braves – 5, St. Louis Cardinals – 7	Busch Stadium (II)	3:34	52,378
2	October 5	Atlanta Braves – 4, St. Louis Cardinals – 10	Busch Stadium (II)	3:02	52,389
3	October 7	St. Louis Cardinals – 7, Atlanta Braves – 1	Turner Field	3:09	49,898

== San Francisco vs. New York ==
=== Game 1 ===
October 4, 2000 1:07 pm (PDT) at Pacific Bell Park in San Francisco, California 66 °F (19 °C), sunny
Team	1	2	3	4	5	6	7	8	9	R	H	E
New York	0	0	1	0	0	0	0	0	0	1	5	0
San Francisco	1	0	4	0	0	0	0	0	X	5	10	0
WP: Liván Hernández (1–0) LP: Mike Hampton (0–1); Home runs: NYM: None; SF: Ellis Burks (1); Attendance: 40,430; Boxscore

In the first ever playoff game at Pacific Bell Park, the Giants struck first in the bottom of the first when Jeff Kent followed a double and single with an RBI groundout off Mike Hampton. Giants Pitcher Liván Hernández allowed one run and five hits (on a walk in the third that tied the game) over a 7 2/3 inning effort. In the bottom of the third, Bill Mueller singled with two outs and scored on Barry Bonds's triple to put the Giants back in front. After a walk, a three-run home run by Ellis Burks capped the scoring at 5–1 as the Giants took a 1–0 series lead.

=== Game 2 ===
October 5, 2000 5:07 pm (PDT) at Pacific Bell Park in San Francisco, California 62 °F (17 °C), sunny
Team	1	2	3	4	5	6	7	8	9	10	R	H	E
New York	0	2	0	0	0	0	0	0	2	1	5	10	0
San Francisco	0	1	0	0	0	0	0	0	3	0	4	8	0
WP: Armando Benítez (1–0) LP: Félix Rodríguez (0–1) Sv: John Franco (1); Home runs: NYM: Edgardo Alfonzo (1); SF: J. T. Snow (1); Attendance: 40,430; Boxscore

In Game 2, the Mets loaded the bases on a hit-by-pitch and two walks off Shawn Estes when Timo Perez's two-run single put them up 2–0. The Giants cut it to 2–1 in the bottom of the inning when Jeff Kent hit a leadoff single and scored on Ellis Burks's double. Behind strong pitching from Al Leiter and a two-out two-run home run from Edgardo Alfonzo in the top of the ninth inning off Félix Rodríguez, the Mets carried a 4–1 lead into the last of the ninth. However, following a double by Barry Bonds and a single from Jeff Kent, pinch hitter J. T. Snow hit a towering three-run home run off Mets reliever Armando Benítez to tie the game at four. The Mets would bounce back in the tenth inning, with Rookie Jay Payton singling home Darryl Hamilton, who doubled with two outs, off Rodriguez. The Giants would threaten again, and had the tying run on with two out and Bonds at the plate, but John Franco struck out Bonds looking on a wicked 3–2 changeup, giving the Mets a heart-stopping 5–4 victory and a 1–1 series moving to New York.

=== Game 3 ===
October 7, 2000 4:18 pm (EDT) at Shea Stadium in Queens, New York 59 °F (15 °C), cloudy
Team	1	2	3	4	5	6	7	8	9	10	11	12	13	R	H	E
San Francisco	0	0	0	2	0	0	0	0	0	0	0	0	0	2	11	0
New York	0	0	0	0	0	1	0	1	0	0	0	0	1	3	9	0
WP: Rick White (1–0) LP: Aaron Fultz (0–1); Home runs: SF: None; NYM: Benny Agbayani (1); Attendance: 56,270; Boxscore

The series shifted to Shea Stadium with game 3 starting at 4:20 P.M. (Eastern time), Giants starting pitcher Russ Ortiz stifled the Mets early, and had a no-hitter entering the sixth inning. He was staked to a 2–0 lead thanks to two leadoff singles in the fourth off Rick Reed, followed RBI singles from Bobby Estalella and Marvin Benard. In the sixth, the Mets broke through. After a walk and single, rookie Timo Pérez, forced into action due to a Game 1 injury to starting right fielder Derek Bell, blooped a single over third base to score Mike Bordick and put the Mets on the scoreboard.

Two innings later, with the Mets still down by one run, pinch hitter Lenny Harris barely beat out the return throw on what would have been an inning-ending double play off Doug Henry. The Giants brought in closer Robb Nen, who had not blown a save since July to face Edgardo Alfonzo. However, Alfonzo ended that streak by ripping a double into the left field corner to score Harris and tie the game.

The game continued on into extra innings, where both teams mounted scoring threats, only to be turned away each time.

The game ended when Benny Agbayani blasted a home run into the left field bleachers with one out in the thirteenth inning off Aaron Fultz, capping another memorable postseason game at Shea Stadium and putting the Mets ahead in the series two games to one. Game three nail-biter lasted 5 hours and 22 minutes, it was the second longest playoff game by hours and minutes in Major League Baseball history at the time. Reliever Rick White earned the win for the Mets.

Agbayani hits it to deep left center...13th inning! Mets win game three!

— Joe Buck's call of Agbayani's game-winning home run

=== Game 4 ===
October 8, 2000 4:07 pm (EDT) at Shea Stadium in Queens, New York 52 °F (11 °C), cloudy
Team	1	2	3	4	5	6	7	8	9	R	H	E
San Francisco	0	0	0	0	0	0	0	0	0	0	1	1
New York	2	0	0	0	2	0	0	0	X	4	6	0
WP: Bobby Jones (1–0) LP: Mark Gardner (0–1); Home runs: SF: None; NYM: Robin Ventura (1); Attendance: 52,888; Boxscore

In perhaps the most unlikely pitching performance in recent memory, Bobby Jones, the Mets' fourth starter, completely shut down the Giants offense, hurling a one-hit shutout to clinch the series for the Mets. Mixing 85 MPH fastballs and 65 MPH curveballs, Jones baffled Giant hitters all afternoon, setting down the side in order in eight of nine innings. Jeff Kent's leadoff double in the fifth inning would be the Giants' only hit. Jones would get all the offense he would need on Robin Ventura's two-run home run in the first inning off Mark Gardner. The Mets padded their lead in the fifth on Edgardo Alfonso's two-run double. Jones got Barry Bonds to fly out to center to end the game, and set off a celebration at Shea Stadium.

Mets announcer Bob Murphy would say following the final out,

The Mets have never had a better ball game pitched in their 39-year history!

The one-hitter set a Mets' record for fewest hits allowed in a post-season complete game, besting Jon Matlack's two-hitter in the 1973 NLCS. It was also the fewest hits allowed in a League Division Series complete game until Roy Halladay's no-hitter in 2010.

=== Composite box ===
2000 NLDS (3–1): New York Mets over San Francisco Giants

Team	1	2	3	4	5	6	7	8	9	10	11	12	13	R	H	E
New York Mets	2	2	1	0	2	1	0	1	2	1	0	0	1	13	30	0
San Francisco Giants	1	1	4	2	0	0	0	0	3	0	0	0	0	11	30	1
Total attendance: 193,375 Average attendance: 48,344

== St. Louis vs. Atlanta ==
=== Game 1 ===
October 3, 2000 12:07 pm (CDT) at Busch Stadium (II) in St. Louis, Missouri 82 °F (28 °C), sunny
Team	1	2	3	4	5	6	7	8	9	R	H	E
Atlanta	0	0	4	0	0	0	0	0	1	5	8	3
St. Louis	6	0	0	1	0	0	0	0	X	7	11	1
WP: Mike James (1–0) LP: Greg Maddux (0–1) Sv: Dave Veres (1); Home runs: ATL: None; STL: Jim Edmonds (1); Attendance: 52,378; Boxscore

It was a poorly pitched game for both starters, both of whom would last four innings or less. Greg Maddux faced Rick Ankiel. In the bottom of the first, Maddux allowed four straight hits to lead off the inning, the last two of which scored a run each. An error on Ray Lankford's ground ball allowed another run to score, then after a sacrifice bunt and intentional walk, Plácido Polanco's single aided by another error cleared the bases, making it 6–0 Cardinals. But the Braves would make a game of it in the top of the third when Ankiel's control slipped away. He walked Maddux and Andruw Jones, then threw four wild pitches to put them on second and third. Ankiel then threw another wild pitch on a ball four to Andrés Galarraga, walking him and letting Maddux score. Brian Jordan then hit an RBI single and after another wild pitch and walk loaded the bases, Walt Weiss' two-run single cut the Cardinals' lead to 6–4. Jim Edmonds' fourth-inning home run made it 7–4. After the fourth, Maddux was done. In the top of the ninth, an error and walk put runners on first and second off Dave Veres before Jordan's RBI single cut the Cardinals' lead to 7–5 and put the tying runs on, but Veres retired the next two batters to end the game. Mike James would get the win in relief of Ankiel.

=== Game 2 ===
October 5, 2000 3:07 pm (CDT) at Busch Stadium (II) in St. Louis, Missouri 65 °F (18 °C), cloudy
Team	1	2	3	4	5	6	7	8	9	R	H	E
Atlanta	2	0	0	0	0	0	0	2	0	4	7	1
St. Louis	3	1	3	1	0	1	0	1	X	10	9	0
WP: Darryl Kile (1–0) LP: Tom Glavine (0–1); Home runs: ATL: Andruw Jones (1); STL: Will Clark (1), Carlos Hernández (1), Mark McGwire (1); Attendance: 52,389; Boxscore

Tom Glavine of the Braves faced Darryl Kile of the Cardinals. In the top of the first, Rafael Furcal drew a leadoff walk, moved to second on a groundout, and scored on Chipper Jones' single. After a double, Brian Jordan's RBI groundout made it 2–0 Braves, but Will Clark hit a three-run homer in the bottom half to put the Cards up for good. Carlos Hernández homered in the second, then in the third inning the Cardinals loaded the bases on a single, double, and hit-by-pitch before Eric Davis' sacrifice fly scored a run; then Ray Lankford's two-run double gave the Cardinals a commanding 7–2 lead. Glavine was finished and the Braves changed pitchers five times. In the next inning, Édgar Rentería walked, stole second and scored on Jim Edmonds' double off Andy Ashby. John Burkett hit Fernando Viña with a pitch leading off the sixth, then Edmonds' one-out RBI double made it 9–2 for the Cardinals. In the eighth, Andruw Jones hit a one-out home run off Mike Timlin, then after Jones doubled, Jordan's RBI double made it 9–4 Cardinals, who got a run in the bottom half on Mark McGwire's home run off Mike Remlinger. Matt Morris pitched a scoreless ninth to give the Cardinals a 2–0 series lead.

=== Game 3 ===
October 7, 2000 1:07 pm (EDT) at Turner Field in Atlanta, Georgia 63 °F (17 °C), sunny
Team	1	2	3	4	5	6	7	8	9	R	H	E
St. Louis	1	0	2	0	1	3	0	0	0	7	8	0
Atlanta	1	0	0	0	0	0	0	0	0	1	3	1
WP: Britt Reames (1–0) LP: Kevin Millwood (0–1); Home runs: STL: Fernando Viña (1), Jim Edmonds (2); ATL: None; Attendance: 49,898; Boxscore

The Cardinals sent Garrett Stephenson to the mound to finish off the Braves. The Braves' last hope was Kevin Millwood, who had pitched a one-hitter in the playoffs the year before. Fernando Viña's leadoff home run in the first put the Cardinals up. In the bottom half, Rafael Furcal drew a leadoff walk, stole second, moved to third on a groundout and scored on Andrés Galarraga's single to tie the game, but the Braves did not score again. Jim Edmonds' two-run homer into the Atlanta bullpen in the third put the Cards in front for good. Stephenson left the game in the fourth due to tendinitis that would eventually require him to get Tommy John surgery. In the fifth, Édgar Rentería walked with two outs, stole second, moved to third on a balk then scored on Edmonds' ground-rule double to knock Millwood out of the game. In the sixth, Terry Mulholland allowed a leadoff walk, single and sacrifice bunt, then Plácido Polanco's fielder's choice off Kerry Ligtenberg scored a run. Polanco stole second before Vina's two-run single off Mike Remlinger capped the scoring at 7–1 Cardinals. Britt Reames won the game in relief as both teams would change pitchers four times. Paul Bako struck out against Dave Veres to end the series. The Cardinals' win in Game 3 put the Braves (who had won their first five NLDS matchups) out of the NLCS for the first time since 1990.

=== Composite box ===
2000 NLDS (3–0): St. Louis Cardinals over Atlanta Braves

Team	1	2	3	4	5	6	7	8	9	R	H	E
St. Louis Cardinals	10	1	5	2	1	4	0	1	0	24	28	1
Atlanta Braves	3	0	4	0	0	0	0	2	1	10	18	5
Total attendance: 154,665 Average attendance: 51,555
