= 2000 National League Championship Series =

| Team (Wins) | Managers | Season |
|---|---|---|
| New York Mets (4) | Bobby Valentine | 94–68 (.580), GB: 1 |
| St. Louis Cardinals (1) | Tony La Russa | 95–67 (.586), GA: 10 |
- Dates: October 11–16
- MVP: Mike Hampton (New York)
- Umpires: Bruce Froemming, Tim Tschida, Ed Rapuano, Dale Scott, Dana DeMuth, Steve Rippley

Broadcast
- Television: Fox
- TV announcers: Joe Buck, Tim McCarver, and Bob Brenly
- Radio: ESPN
- Radio announcers: Charley Steiner and Dave Campbell
- NLDS: New York Mets over San Francisco Giants (3–1); St. Louis Cardinals over Atlanta Braves (3–0)

The 2000 National League Championship Series (NLCS) was a best-of-seven playoff series in Major League Baseball’s (MLB) 2000 postseason pitting the second-seeded St. Louis Cardinals against the fourth-seeded New York Mets for the National League pennant. The Series began on October 11 and ended on October 16. The Cardinals held home-field advantage by virtue of having a better regular season record.

The Mets won the Series four games to one, and would go on to lose to the New York Yankees in the World Series in five games.

== Background ==
This series pitted a pair of teams that were former division rivals. In the mid-1980s, the Mets and Cardinals fought it out for supremacy in the National League East over four seasons, with each team alternating division championships between 1985 and 1988 (the Cardinals in their pennant seasons of 1985 and 1987, the Mets in their championship season of 1986 and 1988; however, the Cardinals weren't serious contenders in both of those years).

The Cardinals, led by manager Tony La Russa, had played through the 2000 season in relatively businesslike fashion. They had won the National League Central division, and swept the Mets' fiercest rival, Atlanta Braves, in three games in the NL Division Series (the first time that Atlanta did not make the NLCS since 1991) that gave St. Louis home field advantage in the NLCS. However, they were struck with several injuries to key players as the playoffs began, including slugger Mark McGwire, catcher Mike Matheny, starting pitcher Garrett Stephenson in Game 3 of the NLDS, and the sudden, unexplained wildness of rookie pitcher Rick Ankiel.

The Mets, on the other hand, engaged in battle with the Braves for much of the season, eventually falling one game short of a division title. They matched up with the San Francisco Giants in the Division Series. After dropping the first game, they would rebound to win the following three games in heart-stopping fashion, including a 13th inning walk off home run from Benny Agbayani to win Game 3 and an improbable one-hit shutout by Bobby Jones to win the clinching Game 4.

This was the first played NLCS since 1990 to not feature the Atlanta Braves as one of the teams; the Braves had competed in the NLCS eight times in the 1990s (the exceptions also included 1994, which did not hold a series due to the 1994–95 Major League Baseball strike).

== Summary ==
=== St. Louis Cardinals vs. New York Mets ===
New York won the series, 4–1.

| Game | Date | Score | Location | Time | Attendance |
|---|---|---|---|---|---|
| 1 | October 11 | New York Mets – 6, St. Louis Cardinals – 2 | Busch Stadium (II) | 3:08 | 52,255 |
| 2 | October 12 | New York Mets – 6, St. Louis Cardinals – 5 | Busch Stadium (II) | 3:59 | 52,250 |
| 3 | October 14 | St. Louis Cardinals – 8, New York Mets – 2 | Shea Stadium | 3:23 | 55,693 |
| 4 | October 15 | St. Louis Cardinals – 6, New York Mets – 10 | Shea Stadium | 3:14 | 55,665 |
| 5 | October 16 | St. Louis Cardinals – 0, New York Mets – 7 | Shea Stadium | 3:17 | 55,695 |

== Game summaries ==
=== Game 1 ===
October 11, 2000 7:18 pm (CDT) at Busch Stadium (II) in St. Louis, Missouri 69 °F (21 °C), clear
| Team | 1 | 2 | 3 | 4 | 5 | 6 | 7 | 8 | 9 | R | H | E |
|---|---|---|---|---|---|---|---|---|---|---|---|---|
| New York | 2 | 0 | 0 | 0 | 1 | 0 | 0 | 0 | 3 | 6 | 8 | 3 |
| St. Louis | 0 | 0 | 0 | 0 | 0 | 0 | 0 | 0 | 2 | 2 | 9 | 0 |
WP: Mike Hampton (1–0) LP: Darryl Kile (0–1); Home runs: NYM: Todd Zeile (1), Jay Payton (1); STL: None; Attendance: 52,255; Boxscore

The Mets jumped on Cardinals starter Darryl Kile right from the outset. Rookie Timo Pérez led off the game with a double into the right field corner, and following a walk to Edgardo Alfonzo, scored on a double by Mike Piazza. A Robin Ventura sacrifice fly would plate Alfonzo, and the Mets were off and running.

Piazza's double resulted in one of the more memorable moments of the series. Mets coach John Stearns was wearing a microphone for Fox Sports during the games, and his screams of "THE MONSTER IS OUT OF THE CAGE!!" were broadcast to a national audience. "The Monster is out of the cage" would become a rallying cry for the Mets and Piazza throughout the series.

Mets starter Mike Hampton was sharp. Over seven innings, he limited the Cardinals to six hits and no runs. At the plate, Hampton helped his own cause by singling, moving to second on a groundout, and scoring the Mets' third run on Alfonzo's RBI single in the fifth inning. Kile allowed those three runs over seven innings.

The Mets would effectively put the game away in the ninth inning off of Mike James on a lead off home run by Todd Zeile and two batters later, a two-run home run by Jay Payton. In the bottom of the inning, Ray Lankford hit a leadoff double off of Armando Benitez. Two outs later, shortstop Kurt Abbott's error to first on Edgar Renteria's ground ball allowed Lankford to score and Renteria to reach first. Then Jim Edmonds singled to right and Timo Perez's errant throw to third allowed Renteria to score, but Eric Davis grounded out to end the game as the Mets' 6–2 win gave them a 1–0 series lead.

=== Game 2 ===
October 12, 2000 7:18 pm (CDT) at Busch Stadium (II) in St. Louis, Missouri 74 °F (23 °C), cloudy
| Team | 1 | 2 | 3 | 4 | 5 | 6 | 7 | 8 | 9 | R | H | E |
|---|---|---|---|---|---|---|---|---|---|---|---|---|
| New York | 2 | 0 | 1 | 0 | 0 | 0 | 0 | 2 | 1 | 6 | 9 | 0 |
| St. Louis | 0 | 1 | 0 | 0 | 2 | 0 | 0 | 2 | 0 | 5 | 10 | 3 |
WP: Turk Wendell (1–0) LP: Mike Timlin (0–1) Sv: Armando Benítez (1); Home runs: NYM: Mike Piazza (1); STL: None; Attendance: 52,250; Boxscore

The Mets once again jumped out to a first inning lead due to the wildness of Cardinals starter Rick Ankiel, who walked two and threw two wild pitches to put runners on second and third with one out. Todd Zeile's sacrifice fly scored a run and after a walk, Benny Agbayani's double scored another. Ankiel only got two outs before being relieved by Britt Reames

The Cardinals trimmed the Mets lead to 2–1 in the second inning against starter Al Leiter. A run-scoring ground out with two on by Eli Marrero would plate Shawon Dunston. The Mets got that run back in the third when Mike Piazza hit his first home run of the series off Reames. The Cardinals knotted the game at 3–3 in the fifth inning on run-scoring doubles by Édgar Rentería and Fernando Tatís after a one-out single.

With the score still tied and two out in the top of the eighth, the Mets would put together a rally to take a 5–3 lead off of Matt Morris. A long single by Alfonzo would score Timo Pérez, who singled with two outs, and following an intentional walk to Piazza, Zeile would single home Alfonzo. However, in the bottom of the inning, John Franco walked Carlos Hernandez, who moved to third on a single and scored on a wild pitch. J.D. Drew's double off of Turk Wendell tied the game again.

In the top of the ninth off of Mike Timlin, after Robin Ventura reached on a Will Clark error, moved to second on a sacrifice bunt, and was pinch run for by Joe McEwing, rookie Jay Payton came through with his second game-winning hit of the postseason, nailing a single up the middle to score McEwing, as Cardinals center fielder Jim Edmonds allowed the ball to hop off the heel of his glove and roll behind him.

Armando Benítez allowed a two-out walk to Jim Edmonds in the last of the ninth, but that was all the Cardinals were able to muster as the Mets took Game 2, 6–5, to take a 2–0 series lead.

=== Game 3 ===
October 14, 2000 4:21 pm (EDT) at Shea Stadium in Queens, New York 76 °F (24 °C), sunny
| Team | 1 | 2 | 3 | 4 | 5 | 6 | 7 | 8 | 9 | R | H | E |
|---|---|---|---|---|---|---|---|---|---|---|---|---|
| St. Louis | 2 | 0 | 2 | 1 | 3 | 0 | 0 | 0 | 0 | 8 | 14 | 0 |
| New York | 1 | 0 | 0 | 1 | 0 | 0 | 0 | 0 | 0 | 2 | 7 | 1 |
WP: Andy Benes (1–0) LP: Rick Reed (0–1); Attendance: 55,693; Boxscore

The Cardinals would mark their first, and only, victory of the NLCS with an easy 8–2 victory. Jim Edmonds hit a two-run double in the top of the first inning off Mets starter Rick Reed. The Mets cut the lead to 2–1 in the bottom half on Mike Piazza's double-play after back-to-back leadoff singles put runners on first and third. In the third, with runners on first and second, Ray Lankford's RBI single and Fernando Tatis's sacrifice fly scored a run each. Next inning, three consecutive one-out singles, the last of which to Edgar Renteria scoring a run, knocked Reed out of the game. The Mets loaded the bases with no outs in the bottom of the inning, but only scored once on Jay Payton's double play. In the fifth, after a leadoff double and subsequent single, Carlos Hernandez's RBI single off of Rick White made it 6–2 Cardinals. After a sacrifice bunt, Fernando Vina's fielder's choice and Renteria's groundout scored a run each to make it 8–2 Cardinals. Cardinals starter Andy Benes pitched eight solid innings, holding the Mets to two runs and six hits, while notching five strikeouts. More importantly, he was able to give the Cardinals' weary bullpen a bit of rest and put them back in the series. Mike James in the ninth allowed a leadoff single and walk, but struck out the next three batters looking to end the game.

=== Game 4 ===
October 15, 2000 8:02 pm (EDT) at Shea Stadium in Queens, New York 76 °F (24 °C), cloudy
| Team | 1 | 2 | 3 | 4 | 5 | 6 | 7 | 8 | 9 | R | H | E |
|---|---|---|---|---|---|---|---|---|---|---|---|---|
| St. Louis | 2 | 0 | 0 | 1 | 3 | 0 | 0 | 0 | 0 | 6 | 11 | 2 |
| New York | 4 | 3 | 0 | 1 | 0 | 2 | 0 | 0 | X | 10 | 9 | 0 |
WP: Glendon Rusch (1–0) LP: Darryl Kile (0–2); Home runs: STL: Jim Edmonds (1), Will Clark (1); NYM: Mike Piazza (2); Attendance: 55,665; Boxscore

Both teams would come out with their hitting shoes on in this game. The Cardinals would jump out to a 2–0 lead in the top of the first inning, as Jim Edmonds hit a two-run home run off Mets Starter Bobby Jones. The lead, however, would be short-lived as the Mets would flex their offensive muscle against Darryl Kile in a record-setting display.

Timo Pérez, as he had done all postseason, sparked the rally with a leadoff ground rule double in the bottom of the first. Edgardo Alfonzo followed with a double of his own, down the right field line, scoring Perez. Mike Piazza followed with a third double for the Mets, a long one-hop drive off the wall in right center. Holding on the fly, Alfonzo only made it to third, but Robin Ventura followed by ripping the Mets' fourth consecutive double, which would score both Alfonzo and Piazza, and put the Mets ahead 3–2. One out later, Benny Agbayani launched a long double off the wall in left center to score Ventura. This was the Mets' fifth double of the inning, which set a new League Championship Series record.

The Mets would continue to bombard Kile and the Cardinals in the second inning. With two outs and the bases loaded, Todd Zeile would hit yet another double for the Mets, scoring two more runs. Agbayani would single home a seventh Mets run before Zeile was tagged out at home to end the inning. Will Clark's home run in the fourth cut the Mets' lead to 7–3

Kile was gone by the fourth inning, and Cardinals pitching coach Dave Duncan was ejected from the game while removing him. Kile's replacement, Mike James, would not fare much better, as Mike Piazza would launch a long home run, well over the Cardinals' bullpen out in deep left field to give the Mets an 8–3 lead after the fourth.

Bobby Jones, who had thrown a magnificent one-hit shutout against the Giants in the division series, struggled while pitching with a big lead. In the fifth inning, Jones would be knocked from the game after surrendering back-to-back leadoff singles followed by an RBI double to Eric Davis, and Glendon Rusch in relief allowed a one-out sacrifice fly to Edgar Renteria and subsequent RBI single to Edmonds. However Rusch then pitched three shutout innings.

The Mets would put the game away in the sixth off of Mike Timlin, thanks to two errors by Cardinals third baseman Fernando Tatís. Tatis' first error allowed Perez to reach base: despite the fact that Tatis had time, his hasty throw was low and Will Clark was unable to handle it. Tatis' second error, a bobble on a Ventura grounder with the bases loaded, would allow Mike Bordick to score. Robin Ventura's sacrifice fly then scored the Mets' last run.

The Mets received strong bullpen work not only from Rusch, but also from John Franco and Armando Benítez, who threw scoreless innings in the eighth and ninth respectively, to close out the Cardinals and give the Mets a commanding 3–1 lead in the series.

This game would turn controversial for LaRussa, who had been bringing injured slugger Mark McGwire off the bench to pinch hit in key situations. Afforded several opportunities with the tying runs in place, LaRussa never sent McGwire up to hit in this game, and eventually he would run out of opportunities to do so.

=== Game 5 ===
October 16, 2000 8:22 pm (EDT) at Shea Stadium in Queens, New York 57 °F (14 °C), cloudy, drizzle
| Team | 1 | 2 | 3 | 4 | 5 | 6 | 7 | 8 | 9 | R | H | E |
|---|---|---|---|---|---|---|---|---|---|---|---|---|
| St. Louis | 0 | 0 | 0 | 0 | 0 | 0 | 0 | 0 | 0 | 0 | 3 | 2 |
| New York | 3 | 0 | 0 | 3 | 0 | 0 | 1 | 0 | X | 7 | 10 | 0 |
WP: Mike Hampton (2–0) LP: Pat Hentgen (0–1); Attendance: 55,695; Boxscore

Needing a victory to close out the series at home and avoid a trip back to St. Louis, the Mets, behind Mike Hampton, cruised to a 7–0 victory and their first National League pennant since their championship season of 1986.

The Mets would once again stake themselves to an early lead, jumping on Cardinals starter Pat Hentgen in the first inning. Again it was Timo Pérez sparking the Mets, singling under the glove of Édgar Rentería, stealing second base and moving to third when catcher Carlos Hernández's throw went into center field. Edgardo Alfonzo would single home Perez. Following a walk to Mike Piazza, Robin Ventura would single home Alfonzo for the Mets' second run. The Mets would add a third run on a fielder's choice by Todd Zeile.

The Mets would effectively put the game away in the fourth inning, when with two outs and the bases loaded (a situation in which Zeile found himself the previous night), Todd Zeile hit a long double off the wall in right center field, scoring three runs, giving the Mets a 6–0 lead, and resulting in raucous Mets fans making Shea Stadium literally shake. Hentgen was finished and was relieved by Mike Timlin, who escaped without further damage. Britt Reames added two shutout innings.

The Mets would add a final run off of Rick Ankiel when Mike Bordick drew a leadoff walk, moved to second on a groundout and scored on two wild pitches in the seventh inning. In yet another controversial move from Tony La Russa, Ankiel was inserted into the game in the bottom of the seventh. After walking Mike Bordick to start the inning, retired Hampton and Perez, before uncorking a pair of wild pitches with Edgardo Alfonzo at the plate, allowing Bordick to score the seventh and final run of the game. Ankiel would depart after walking Alfonzo, with Mike James finishing the inning.

An ugly incident was averted in the bottom of the eighth inning, where with two outs and Benny Agbayani on first base, Jay Payton was hit near his left eye by a fastball from Cardinals pitcher Dave Veres. Payton immediately leapt up and charged Veres, and both benches and bullpens cleared, although Payton would be restrained by Agbayani and Bobby Valentine before the incident could escalate. Mets pitcher John Franco mugged for the fans to settle down following the incident; the crowd responded by chanting Na Na Hey Hey Kiss Him Goodbye at the Cardinals, and booed them off the field at the conclusion of the inning.

Saying before the game that "I was looking to pitch the game of my life", Mike Hampton was nothing short of superb. In pitching a complete-game shutout, Hampton allowed only three hits and one walk, and struck out eight. His efforts in this game, and in Game 1 would result in his being named MVP of the NLCS.

Hampton closed out the game by getting pinch-hitter Rick Wilkins to fly out to center field. Mets center fielder Timo Pérez jumped up and down three times before making the catch, Robin Ventura hoisted Hampton in the air and a wild celebration was touched off, culminating in Mike Piazza leading the entire Mets team in a victory lap around Shea Stadium.

== Composite box ==
2000 NLCS (4–1): New York Mets over St. Louis Cardinals

| Team | 1 | 2 | 3 | 4 | 5 | 6 | 7 | 8 | 9 | R | H | E |
|---|---|---|---|---|---|---|---|---|---|---|---|---|
| New York Mets | 12 | 3 | 1 | 5 | 1 | 2 | 1 | 2 | 4 | 31 | 43 | 4 |
| St. Louis Cardinals | 4 | 1 | 2 | 2 | 8 | 0 | 0 | 2 | 2 | 21 | 47 | 7 |
Total attendance: 271,558 Average attendance: 54,312

== Aftermath ==
With the NLCS victory, the Mets advanced to the 2000 World Series, their first appearance in the World Series since their championship season of 1986. They would meet their crosstown rivals, the New York Yankees in the first Subway Series to take place since 1956. In five games that were as nip-and-tuck as baseball can be, the Yankees came out on top, winning their third consecutive World Championship. The Mets would then muddle through several unsuccessful seasons, and not return to the postseason until 2006.

Series MVP Mike Hampton would leave via free agency following the season, signing with the Colorado Rockies. Hampton's departure from New York was not well-received, as he made comments about the city's school system, and was routinely booed upon his reappearances at Shea Stadium.

The Cardinals returned to the National League Championship Series in 2002, losing to the San Francisco Giants. They would return to the World Series for the first time since 1987 when they defeated the Houston Astros in the NLCS in 2004, but were swept by the Red Sox in four games. The Cardinals faced the Mets again in the 2006 National League Championship Series, with the Redbirds defeating the Mets this time in an epic and dramatic series that ended in seven games. The Cardinals finished the job this time around, defeating the Tigers in the World Series to capture their 10th World Series. For the 2006 NLCS, the only player remaining on either roster from the series in 2000 was Cardinals center fielder Jim Edmonds. There were no 2006 Mets left on the team that played in 2000.
