= Bubba Trammell =

American baseball player (born 1971)

- Outfielder
- Born: November 6, 1971 (age 54); Knoxville, Tennessee, U.S.
- Batted: Right Threw: Right

MLB debut
- April 1, 1997, for the Detroit Tigers

Last MLB appearance
- June 22, 2003, for the New York Yankees

MLB statistics
- Batting average: .261
- Home runs: 82
- Runs batted in: 285
- Stats at Baseball Reference

Teams
- Detroit Tigers (1997); Tampa Bay Devil Rays (1998–2000); New York Mets (2000); San Diego Padres (2001–2002); New York Yankees (2003)

Thomas Bubba Trammell (born November 6, 1971) is an American former professional baseball outfielder and designated hitter. He played in Major League Baseball (MLB) for the Detroit Tigers, Tampa Bay Devil Rays, New York Mets, San Diego Padres, and the New York Yankees. During his seven Major League seasons, he batted .261 and hit 82 home runs. Trammell appeared in the 2000 World Series as a member of the Mets.

== Early years ==
Trammell was born on November 6, 1971, in Knoxville, Tennessee. He grew up with his mother, Brenda Graves, father, Clarence L. “Buddy” Trammell, and older sister, Kimberely Diane Trammell. He was named after Bubba Wyche, a Tennessee football quarterback.

Trammell attended Central High School in Knoxville, where he played baseball and golf. He went on to attend and play baseball at Cleveland State Community College and the University of Tennessee. During his two years at U.T. (1993–1994), he had a .368 batting average, and hit 22 home runs and 105 RBIs. He would later be named to the school's "All-Century Team."

At the age of 21, Trammell was drafted by the Baltimore Orioles, but he did not sign. He was drafted again two years later for the Detroit Tigers in the 11th round of the 1994 MLB amateur draft, but this time, he did sign a contract. He played on Detroit's Triple-A affiliate, the Toledo Mud Hens, for three years. By this time, he was 6’2”, weighed 220 pounds, hit right, and batted right.

== MLB career ==
Trammell made his Major League Baseball debut when he was 25 years old. His first game was on April 1, 1997, with the Detroit Tigers. He played in the majority of the Tigers’ opening games. He mostly played as the designated hitter, but also played several games in left field and right field. In his 44 games, he batted .228. He was sent back to the Triple-As by May and finished the season there.

After his stint with the Tigers, Trammell was drafted by the Tampa Bay Devil Rays. He pinch-hit in the team's first game on March 31, 1998, against Detroit. Over the next two and a half years with the Devil Rays, Trammell had limited play; he played in 59 games in 1998, 82 games in 1999, and 66 games in 2000. He mostly played left field, but also made appearances as a right fielder and designated hitter. He batted .286 in 1998, .290 in 1999, and .275 in 2000.

Trammell has been described as a fan favorite. One sports columnist wrote: “[H]e was the kind of guy you wanted to see achieve great things. He was a hustler and a gambler on the field, and carried a big bat into the box with him nightly”. Notably, there was a group of fans who sat in section 142 of the Devil Ray's stadium— Tropicana Field— and called themselves the “142 Crew.” They were led by fan Ted Fleming, who would go on to work for The Examiner and host his own sports radio show. The “142 Crew” became known for their "Bubba" signs and enthusiastic cheering, which included a “Bu-bba!” chant. This section was so loud that the Devil Rays sometimes timed their stadium music around its chanting.

Trammell played for the Devil Rays until July 2000, when he was traded to the New York Mets. He hit a home run in his first game on July 30, becoming the seventh player to hit a home run in his first Mets at-bat. He continued to play as a left fielder and right fielder for 36 games. He batted .232. The Mets won the 2000 National League pennant, then played and lost in the 2000 World Series against the New York Yankees. Of the five games in this series, Trammell played two games as a right fielder and two games as a designated hitter. He hit two home runs and batted .400.

Trammell was traded to the San Diego Padres in 2001. He later reported that, “At the time I was ready to sign my contract [with the Padres], I told them, ‘Hey, I'll play for free if you give me 500 at-bats!’ I was kidding, but I would have”. Trammell finally became a regular, playing in 142 games and hitting .261 in 2001, and 133 games and hitting .243 in 2002. Trammell had one of his best seasons in 2001, hitting 25 homeruns and 92 RBIs. Furthermore, he won the “Favorite San Padres” award in 2001.

Trammell was traded to the Yankees in 2003. He played in 22 games as a left fielder and designated hitter. His batting average was .200. He left the Yankees in the middle of the season. His last game was on June 23, 2003, which ended up being his last game played in the major leagues. Bubba later reported that he had been suffering from depression.

In the years following his departure from the Yankees, Trammell struggled with personal problems and sustained a meniscus injury. He played in the minor leagues hoping to make a comeback, but he never made it back into the major leagues. He officially retired on July 2, 2007, while on a rehab assignment with the Aberdeen IronBirds, where he was batting .143 after nine games.

Overall, Trammell played 584 games in his seven-year MLB career. He was at bat 1,798 times, batted .261, made 469 hits, 96 doubles, 7 triples, 82 home runs, 285 runs batted in, and had a .339 on-base percentage. He played 297 games in right field and 194 games in left field, and had a fielding percentage of .986.

== Personal life ==
Trammell and his former wife, Melissa, have three children: Madison Rebecca (born in 1995), Brandon Allen (born in 1998), and Bryson (born in 2002). Trammell reported that he battled depression starting in 2003. His great-grandfather and his great-uncle had been hospitalized, and he had marital problems. One notable incident occurred on September 6, 2003. According to an incident report, Melissa was living with a platonic friend named Steven Hume. Trammell allegedly confronted them after a baseball game and threatened to kill Hume. Trammell and his wife divorced in 2004. Melissa was given custody of their children and remarried. In addition, Trammell's mother and sister were diagnosed with cancer in 2004. Teammates described Trammell as soft-spoken and friendly. Bubba Trammell is not related to former Detroit Tigers HOF shortstop, Alan Trammell.
