= Bobby Jones (right-handed pitcher) =

American baseball player (born 1970)

- Pitcher
- Born: February 10, 1970 (age 56); Fresno, California, U.S.
- Batted: Right Threw: Right

MLB debut
- August 14, 1993, for the New York Mets

Last MLB appearance
- September 2, 2002, for the San Diego Padres

MLB statistics
- Win–loss record: 89–83
- Earned run average: 4.36
- Strikeouts: 887
- Stats at Baseball Reference

Teams
- New York Mets (1993–2000); San Diego Padres (2001–2002)

Career highlights and awards
- All-Star (1997)

Robert Joseph Jones (born February 10, 1970) is an American former professional baseball pitcher. He played in Major League Baseball (MLB) from 1993 to 2002 for the New York Mets and San Diego Padres.

== Professional career ==
Jones was selected by the New York Mets with the 36th pick in the first round of the 1991 amateur draft. He was a compensatory pick the Mets received when Darryl Strawberry left the team as a free agent. He made his major league debut on August 14, 1993, against the Philadelphia Phillies, where he picked up a win, allowing one run over six innings.

By 1994, Jones had emerged as a mainstay in the Mets starting rotation. His 12 wins and 3.15 earned run average placed him among the league leaders. In 1995, he led the team in wins and strikeouts.

The 1997 season was a breakout year for Jones. He raced out to an early 10–2 record by June, and appeared in his first and only All-Star Game. He pitched the 8th inning for the National League, and highlighted his effort with strikeouts of Ken Griffey Jr. and Mark McGwire. Although Jones fizzled out in the second half of the season, his 15 wins stood as his career best.

By 1999, however, Jones ended up being the odd man out in a crowded rotation. After missing much of the season with injuries, posting only 12 starts, Jones was left off the Mets' postseason roster. More indignity faced Jones as he was sent down to the minor leagues following a poor start in the 2000 season. However, Jones returned to the Mets in late June, and although his 5.06 ERA was his worst for any season in which he started more than 25 games, he was included as the 4th starter on the Mets' postseason roster.

Selected to start the fourth and potentially clinching game of the National League Division Series against the San Francisco Giants, Jones delivered the finest outing of his career. Mixing his 85-mile-per-hour (137 km/h) fastball and 65-mile-per-hour (105 km/h) curveball, Jones kept the Giants' potent lineup thoroughly baffled all afternoon. Jones retired the Giants in order in eight out of nine innings, allowing only a fifth-inning double to Jeff Kent. His one-hit shutout clinched the series and sent the Mets on to the National League Championship Series. It also set a Mets' record for fewest hits allowed in a post-season complete game, besting Jon Matlack's two-hitter in the 1973 NLCS, and was the fewest hits allowed in a League Division Series complete game until Roy Halladay's no-hitter in the 2010 National League Division Series.

Jones went on to make starts in both the NLCS against the St. Louis Cardinals and in the World Series against the New York Yankees. However, Mets management allowed him to leave via free agency following the 2000 season, and he signed with the San Diego Padres, where he posted two marginal years before retiring following the 2002 season.

Jones posted double figures in wins each season from 1994 through 1997. He currently stands 9th on the Mets all-time list with 74 wins.

== After baseball ==
Jones and his wife, Kristi, have three children and currently reside in Clovis, California. Jones briefly worked as an interim Assistant Coach for the Fresno State Bulldogs in 2006.

Jones and a partner have created their own barbecue sauce, called Sloppy Jon’s. He frequently cooks for local fundraisers. He is also a wine collector and has made different wines with his friends.
