= Darryl Kile =

American baseball player (1968–2002)

- Kile with the St. Louis Cardinals in 2000
- Pitcher
- Born: December 2, 1968; Garden Grove, California, U.S.
- Died: June 22, 2002 (aged 33); Chicago, Illinois, U.S.
- Batted: Right Threw: Right

MLB debut
- April 8, 1991, for the Houston Astros

Last MLB appearance
- June 18, 2002, for the St. Louis Cardinals

MLB statistics
- Win–loss record: 133–119
- Earned run average: 4.12
- Strikeouts: 1,668
- Stats at Baseball Reference

Teams
- Houston Astros (1991–1997); Colorado Rockies (1998–1999); St. Louis Cardinals (2000–2002)

Career highlights and awards
- 3× All-Star (1993, 1997, 2000); Pitched a no-hitter on September 8, 1993

Darryl Andrew Kile (December 2, 1968 – June 22, 2002) was an American professional baseball starting pitcher. He pitched from 1991 to 2002 for three Major League Baseball (MLB) teams, primarily for the Houston Astros. Kile was known for his sharp, big-breaking curveball. He died at the age of 33 of coronary artery disease in 2002 in Chicago, where he and the St. Louis Cardinals were staying for a weekend series against the Chicago Cubs. He was the first active major league player to die during the regular season since 1979, when the New York Yankees' Thurman Munson died in a plane crash.

== Early life ==
Kile was born on December 2, 1968, in Garden Grove, California, near Angel Stadium. He attended Norco High School in Norco, California, where his awkward frame and low pitch velocity — his four-seam fastball topping out at 78 mph (126 km/h) — meant that he was mostly overlooked by college recruiters and scouts. In 1987, after graduating from Norco, Kile enrolled at Chaffey Junior College in Rancho Cucamonga, California, and joined their college baseball team as a walk-on. Between his freshman and sophomore year of college, Kile underwent a growth spurt that took him from 6 feet 2 inches (1.88 m) to 6 feet 5 inches (1.96 m), helped him gain 20 pounds (9.1 kg), and added 13 mph (21 km/h) to his fastball.

=== Houston Astros ===
Kile was selected by the Houston Astros in the 30th round of the 1987 Major League draft. Having been successful with the Tucson Toros, the Astros' AAA club in the Pacific Coast League, Kile entered the majors in 1991, going 7–11 in 22 starts. In his first major league start on April 24, 1991, Kile had a no-hitter going when he was lifted after six innings by manager Art Howe, who wanted to protect the 22-year-old rookie's arm. Kile's breakthrough year came in 1993 when he went 15–8 with a 3.51 earned run average and made the All-Star team. On September 8, Kile pitched a no-hitter against the New York Mets. He pitched seven seasons with the Astros, mostly as a starter. Another strong season was 1997, when he went 19–7, compiled a 2.57 ERA, made the All-Star team again, threw a career-high 255 2/3 innings, and pitched four shutouts. He finished fifth in voting for the NL Cy Young Award. Kile made his first postseason appearance in Game 1 of the 1997 National League Division Series against the Atlanta Braves, giving up only two hits but suffering a hard-luck 2–1 loss. Atlanta swept Houston in the best-of-five series.

=== Colorado Rockies and St. Louis Cardinals ===
In 1998, Kile signed with the Colorado Rockies as a free agent. Kile suffered control problems, allowing hitters to lay off his curveball. After two seasons in which he was a combined 21–30 and posted ERAs of 5.20 and 6.61, Kile was traded to the Cardinals. In his first season with St. Louis, Kile went 20–9, becoming the first Cardinal pitcher since John Tudor and Joaquín Andújar in 1985 to win 20 games in a season. He made his third All-Star team and again finished fifth in NL Cy Young Award voting. He earned the first playoff victory of his career in Game 2 of the 2000 NLDS against Atlanta, but suffered two losses in the NL Championship Series, which the Cardinals lost to the Mets in five games.

Kile went 16–11 in 2001, and the Cardinals made the playoffs again, losing to the eventual world champion Arizona Diamondbacks in the NLDS. Kile was the starting pitcher for Game 3 and received a no-decision. Kile threw 227 1/3 innings and compiled a 3.09 ERA that season, despite having an injured shoulder which required surgery after the Cardinals were eliminated from the playoffs. He spent the offseason rehabilitating and was ready for the start of the 2002 season. In 12 seasons as a major league pitcher, Kile never went on the disabled list.

On June 18, Kile pitched in an interleague game against the Anaheim Angels, scattering six hits over 7 2/3 innings, allowing one run. He exited the game in the eighth inning to a standing ovation. Kile and the Cardinals won the game, 7–2, and moved into first place in the NL's Central Division, a spot they held for the rest of the 2002 season.

== Personal life ==
Kile proposed to his wife, Flynn, in 1991, when they were both 22 years old. They were married on January 11, 1992, and had three children. He and his family lived in Clayton, Missouri, during the baseball season. The family also owned a home in Englewood, Colorado, where they lived during the offseason, though at the time of Kile's death, the family was in the process of moving to San Diego for the offseasons.

== Death ==
On June 22, 2002, during pregame warmups for what would have been a day game in Chicago against the rival Cubs, team personnel noted Kile's absence. Hotel staff entered his room and discovered him in his bed, under the covers, dead of a heart attack. His death, which came four days after that of longtime Cardinal broadcaster Jack Buck, was ruled to be from natural causes; an autopsy found that Kile had an enlarged heart, two of his coronary arteries were 90% blocked, and there was a blood clot in one artery. Kile's father had died from a blood clot in 1993, aged 44.

Cubs catcher Joe Girardi announced at Wrigley Field that the afternoon's game versus the Cardinals had been cancelled, though he did not give a specific reason. Girardi tearfully gave the news at 2:37 pm CDT, broadcast regionally on Fox: "Excuse me. I thank you for your patience. We regret to inform you because of a tragedy in the Cardinal family, that the commissioner has cancelled the game today. Thank you. Please be respectful. You will find out eventually what has happened, and I ask that you say a prayer for the St. Louis Cardinals' family." After that, Jack Buck's son Joe, who was set to call play-by-play for that day's game on Fox, reported Kile's death to the TV audience from the Wrigley Field broadcast booth. The game was rescheduled and made up later in the year on August 31, a 10–4 Cardinal defeat. Jason Simontacchi, who pitched for the Cardinals, was visibly emotional during the game since Kile was a mentor to him. Later that season, when the Cardinals clinched the Central Division championship in a game against the Astros, teammate Albert Pujols carried Kile's number 57 jersey, on a hanger, to the celebration on the field.

=== Memorial ===
The Cardinals honored Kile by placing a small "DK 57" sign in the home bullpen. This sign was carried over to the new Busch Stadium and remains today. The team wrote "DK 57" on their hats. The team put chalk and markers in the Busch Stadium concourses so fans could write similar messages on their caps. In the All-Star Game, Cardinals pitcher Matt Morris wrote DK 57 on his hands and held them up when they announced his name in honor of his fallen teammate and close friend.

Since Kile's death, the Astros have not assigned his uniform number 57 to another player. The Cardinals were the first of Kile's former teams to re-issue the number, doing so in 2021, giving it to pitcher Zack Thompson during spring training. Thompson wore the number during his major league debut in 2022, nearly twenty full years after Kile's death. The Rockies kept the number 57 out of the rotation until it was issued to Tommy Doyle in 2023.

The Astros honored Kile with a memorial plaque that hangs along the left field wall at Daikin Park under the 1997 Central Division Championship banner, the last season Kile played for Houston before signing with Colorado. A "DK 57" sign currently sits among the wall in left-center field. The Rockies have a memorial near the bullpens. It is circular, says "DK 57", and is on pinstripes.

In 2003, the Darryl Kile Good Guy Award was established and is presented annually to the Astros player and Cardinals player who best exemplify Kile's traits of "a good teammate, a great friend, a fine father and a humble man". The winners are selected, respectively, by the Houston and St. Louis chapters of the Baseball Writers' Association of America (BBWAA). The first recipients of the award were Jeff Bagwell and Mike Matheny of the Astros and Cardinals, respectively.

Kile was given an exemption by the Baseball Writers' Association of America and placed on the ballot for the Baseball Hall of Fame in 2003. With seven votes, he was eliminated from future BBWAA ballot consideration.

== See also ==
- Houston Astros award winners and league leaders
- List of baseball players who died during their careers
- List of Colorado Rockies team records
- List of Houston Astros no-hitters
- List of Major League Baseball career hit batsmen leaders
- List of Major League Baseball no-hitters
- St. Louis Cardinals award winners and league leaders

Awards and achievements
Preceded by Jim Abbott	No-hitter pitcher September 8, 1993	Succeeded by Kent Mercker
