= Glendon Rusch =

American baseball player (born 1974)

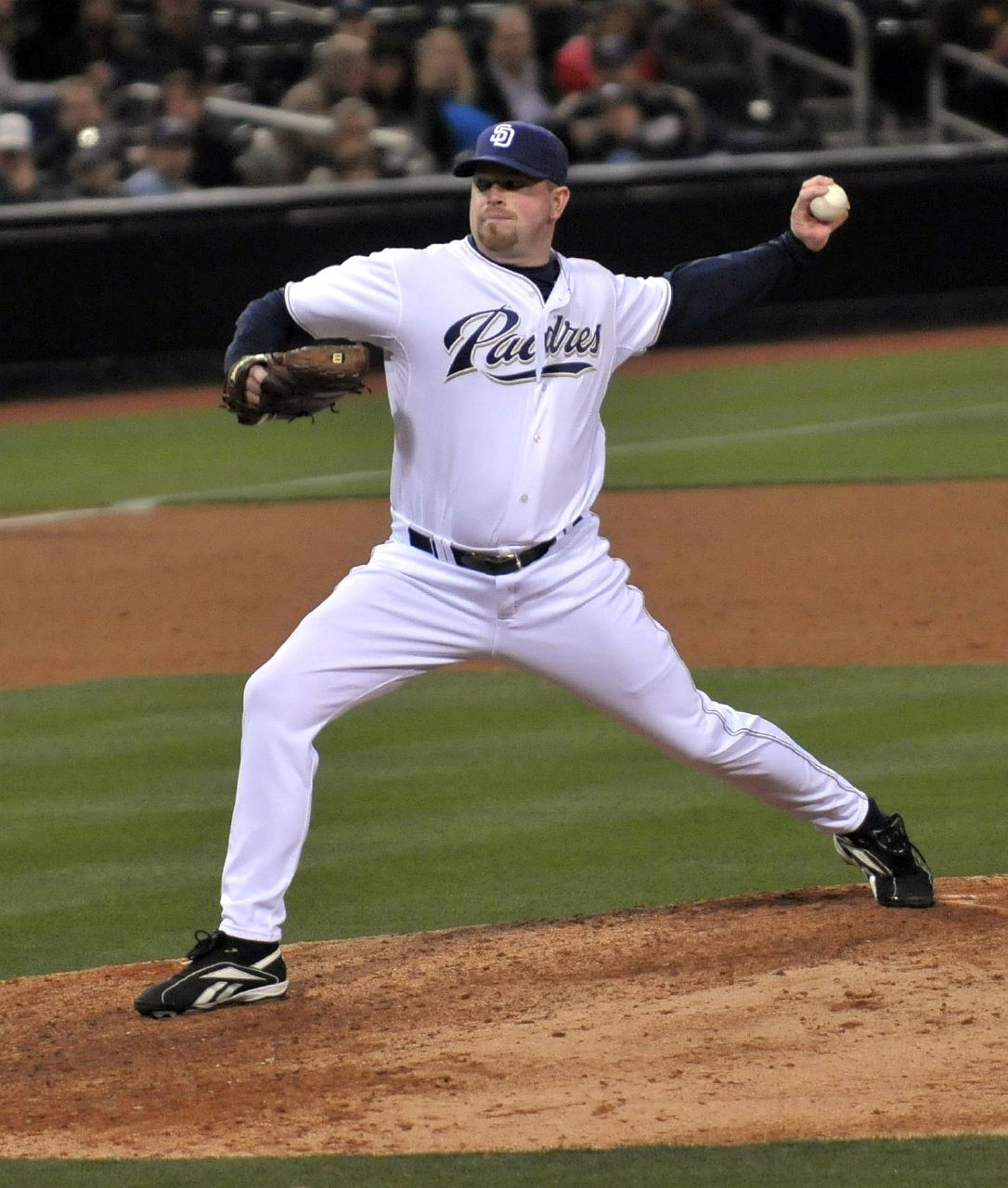
- Rusch with the San Diego Padres

Tri-City Dust Devils
- Pitcher / Coach
- Born: November 7, 1974 (age 51); Seattle, Washington, U.S.
- Batted: Left Threw: Left

MLB debut
- April 6, 1997, for the Kansas City Royals

Last MLB appearance
- May 13, 2009, for the Colorado Rockies

MLB statistics
- Win–loss record: 67–99
- Earned run average: 5.04
- Strikeouts: 1,088
- Stats at Baseball Reference

Teams
- Kansas City Royals (1997–1999); New York Mets (1999–2001); Milwaukee Brewers (2002–2003); Chicago Cubs (2004–2006); San Diego Padres (2008); Colorado Rockies (2008–2009)

Glendon James Rusch (/ˈrʌʃ/; born November 7, 1974) is an American professional baseball pitcher who played in Major League Baseball for the Kansas City Royals, New York Mets, Milwaukee Brewers, Chicago Cubs, San Diego Padres and Colorado Rockies from 1997 to 2009.

== Early life ==
Rusch played baseball at Shorecrest High School in Seattle, Washington. As a senior, he had a 0.79 earned run average (ERA) and struck out 134 batters while walking 15. He committed to play college baseball for the Washington Huskies. Rusch was selected out of high school by the Kansas City Royals in the 17th round of the 1993 MLB draft and chose to sign.

== Baseball career ==
Rusch made his major league debut in 1997. Near the end of the 1999 season, he was traded to the New York Mets, and in 2002 he was traded along with Lenny Harris to the Milwaukee Brewers for four players, including Jeromy Burnitz in a three-team deal that also involved the Colorado Rockies.

In 2002, Rusch tied for the National League in losses with 16. In 2004, he signed with the Chicago Cubs and had arguably his finest year as he recorded a career-low 3.47 ERA and 1.23 WHIP and had a 6–2 record, the first winning record of his career.

In September of 2006, Rusch was diagnosed with a life-threatening blood clot in his lung and missed the rest of the 2006 season. On January 25, 2007, the Cubs released the left-hander. He had one year left on his contract.

On October 31, 2007, Rusch announced that he was officially a free agent and would attempt a comeback for the 2008 season. He threw a bullpen session for interested teams on November 2 and on December 14, signed a minor league contract with the San Diego Padres. On March 26, 2008, the Padres purchased his contract and added him to the major league roster. On May 15, Rusch turned down an assignment to Triple-A, and became a free agent.

On May 16, 2008, he signed a minor league contract with the Colorado Rockies. On May 31, the Rockies purchased his contract and added him to the active roster.

On January 14, 2009, Rusch signed a one-year, $750,000 minor-league deal. He made the team out of spring training. On May 15, Rusch was designated for assignment.

== Coaching career ==
In January 2015, Rusch was named pitching coach for the San Diego Padres Class A – Advanced team Lake Elsinore Storm, of the California League.

In December 2024, Rusch was named pitching coach for the Glacier Range Riders, an independent baseball team of the Pioneer League in Kalispell, Montana, under manager Todd Pratt.

In 2026, he was named as the pitching coach for the Tri-City Dust Devils the High-A affiliate of the Los Angeles Angels.
