= John Franco =

American baseball player (born 1960)

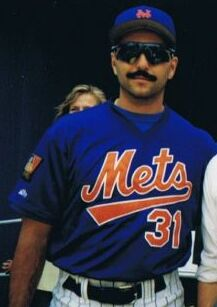
- Franco with the New York Mets in 1994
- Pitcher
- Born: September 17, 1960 (age 65); Brooklyn, New York, U.S.
- Batted: Left Threw: Left

MLB debut
- April 24, 1984, for the Cincinnati Reds

Last MLB appearance
- July 1, 2005, for the Houston Astros

MLB statistics
- Games pitched: 1,119
- Win–loss record: 90–87
- Earned run average: 2.89
- Strikeouts: 975
- Saves: 424
- Stats at Baseball Reference

Teams
- Cincinnati Reds (1984–1989); New York Mets (1990–2001, 2003–2004); Houston Astros (2005)

Career highlights and awards
- 4× All-Star (1986, 1987, 1989, 1990); 2× NL Rolaids Relief Man Award (1988, 1990); 3× NL saves leader (1988, 1990, 1994); New York Mets Hall of Fame

John Anthony Franco (born September 17, 1960) is an American former professional baseball player. He played in Major League Baseball as a left-handed relief pitcher between 1984 and 2005. Franco established himself as an All-Star player with the Cincinnati Reds before spending the majority of his career with the New York Mets. He ended his 21-year career with one final season with the Houston Astros.

Franco's 1,119 career games pitched is a National League record, and ranks fourth in major league history. His 424 career saves ranks seventh all-time in major league history (ranking second when he retired), and remains the most by a left-hander. For 15 of his 21 seasons, he played for the New York Mets, serving as team captain in his final years with the team. Franco was inducted into the New York Mets Hall of Fame in 2012.

== Early life ==
Franco, who is of Italian heritage, grew up in the Gravesend section of Brooklyn. His father, Jim Franco, was a New York City Department of Sanitation worker who encouraged his son's baseball aspirations; Franco honored his father by wearing an orange Sanitation Department work-shirt under his jersey. John graduated from Lafayette High School in Brooklyn and St. John's University in Queens, where he pitched two no-hitters in his freshman year. In 1980, he played collegiate summer baseball with the Cotuit Kettleers of the Cape Cod Baseball League.

== Career ==
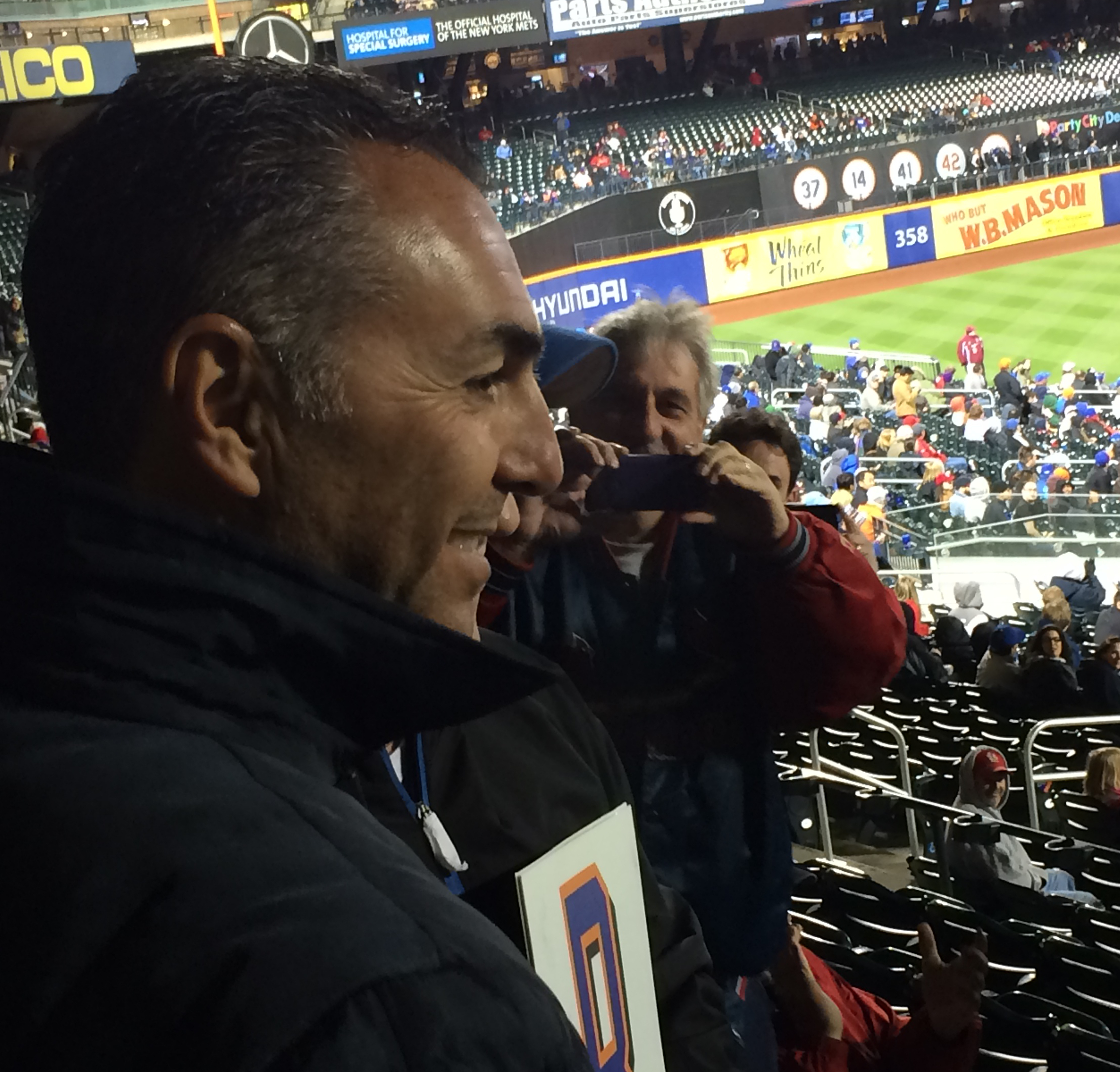
John Franco at Citi Field in 2014.

Franco was selected by the Los Angeles Dodgers on June 8, 1981, in the 5th round of the amateur draft. Before reaching the major leagues, he was traded to the Cincinnati Reds on May 9, 1983, with Brett Wise for Rafael Landestoy. Landestoy batted under .200 before retiring the following year while Franco was a star reliever for much of the next two decades. Franco debuted with the Reds on April 24, 1984. Franco was a traditional relief pitcher with a "90-mph fastball and a change-up that breaks away from a righthanded batter like a screwball."

Throughout his six seasons with the Reds, Franco was a successful closer, winning the National League Rolaids Relief Man of the Year Award in 1988. He helped the Reds finish second four seasons in a row (1985–1988).

On December 6, 1989, at the age of 29, he was traded with Don Brown to the Mets for Randy Myers and Kip Gross. He remained with the Mets organization until the end of the 2004 season. During his time with the Mets, he won the Rolaids Relief Man of the Year Award in 1990, became team captain, and remained the closer until 1999, when he moved to a setup role for new closer Armando Benítez. He led the league in saves for the 1988, 1990, and 1994 seasons. He reached the postseason for the first time in 1999 and the World Series in 2000.

On May 11, 1996, in a game against the Chicago Cubs, the Mets held "John Franco Day" to celebrate his 300th career save. In the fifth inning, a brawl that cleared both benches and bullpens resulted in Franco being ejected from the game, along with eight other players.

Injuries caused Franco to miss the 2002 baseball season, but he made a successful recovery from surgery and returned in June 2003. He signed a one-year contract for the 2004 season. He finished with a 2-7 record with 36 strikeouts and a 5.28 ERA in 46 innings.

In January 2005, he was signed to a one-year deal with the Astros, at the age of 44, making him at that time the oldest active pitcher in Major League Baseball. He appeared in 33 games with one loss against his old club the Mets, six holds and one blown save in 15 innings but his ERA was 7.20 after a rough May and June. In his final appearance on July 1, he allowed three runs on three hits while getting just two outs on six batters faced. On July 1, 2005, Franco was designated for assignment, and he was subsequently released, which proved to be the end of his baseball career.

== Personal life ==
John married his high school sweetheart, Rose, whom he has known since he was 17.

His son J.J. Franco, who was drafted by the Mets out of high school, attended Brown University, where he played as an infielder. J.J. was drafted by the Atlanta Braves in the 2014 MLB draft and played with the Braves and Mets minor league systems through the 2018 season. Franco's cousin, Scott Pagano, played minor league baseball.

Throughout his career, Franco supplied tickets to members of the Bonanno crime family of the Italian-American Mafia and on one occasion Canadian organized crime figures, according to FBI documents made public in 2004. There was no suggestion that he committed any crimes but his behavior was a violation of Major League Baseball rules forbidding contact with known criminals.

== Media ==
Franco appeared on the television show Pros vs. Joes during season three.

During an interview, he revealed that he threw a circle changeup which was often mistaken for a screwball.

== Honors ==
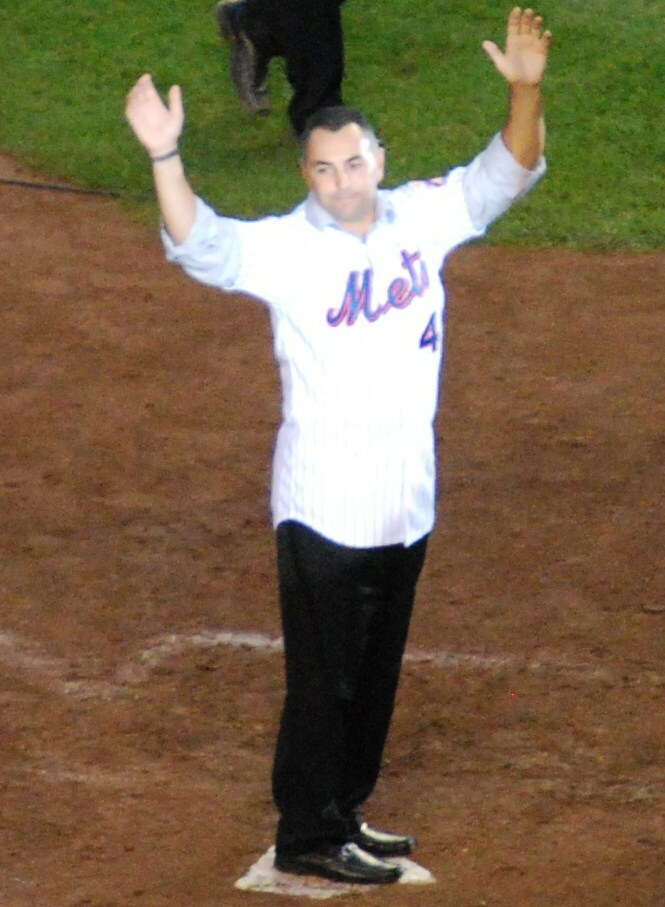
Franco in a post-game ceremony following the final game at Shea Stadium

Franco was inducted into the Staten Island Sports Hall of Fame in 2008. He was also inducted into the National Italian American Sports Hall of Fame in 2008.

On March 29, 2009, Franco threw the ceremonial first pitch in the first game played on Citi Field, a Big East college game between St. John's (his alma mater) and Georgetown.

On June 3, 2012, in a ceremony at Citi Field, Franco was inducted into the New York Mets Hall of Fame.

== Career accomplishments ==
- Pitching record: 90-87
- Saves: 424, fifth most in major league history behind, Mariano Rivera, Trevor Hoffman, Lee Smith and Francisco Rodríguez, and the most for any left-handed pitcher.
- Strikeouts: 975
- ERA: 2.89
- Innings pitched: 1245 2/3
- Games pitched: 1119
- 4-time All-Star (1986, 1987, 1989, 1990)
- 3-time NL Save Leader (1988, 1990, 1993)
- Postseason record: 2-0, one save, 1.88 ERA in 15 postseason appearances
- New York Mets 3rd team captain (2001–2004)

== See also ==
- List of Major League Baseball annual saves leaders
- List of Major League Baseball career saves leaders
- List of people from Staten Island § Baseball
