= Mike James (baseball) =

American baseball player (born 1967)

- Pitcher
- Born: August 15, 1967 (age 58); Fort Walton Beach, Florida, U.S.
- Batted: Right Threw: Right

MLB debut
- April 29, 1995, for the California Angels

Last MLB appearance
- May 5, 2002, for the Colorado Rockies

MLB statistics
- Win–loss record: 16–14
- Earned run average: 3.67
- Strikeouts: 247
- Stats at Baseball Reference

Teams
- California / Anaheim Angels (1995–1998); St. Louis Cardinals (2000–2001); Colorado Rockies (2002)

Michael Elmo James (born August 15, 1967) is an American former professional baseball pitcher. He played in Major League Baseball (MLB) for the California / Anaheim Angels, St. Louis Cardinals and Colorado Rockies.

== Amateur career ==
Mike James played junior college baseball at Lurleen B. Wallace Community College. On June 2, 1987, he was drafted by the Los Angeles Dodgers in the 43rd round of the 1987 MLB draft. James signed with the Dodgers on May 21, 1988.

== Professional career ==
=== California Angels ===
On October 26, 1993, Mike James was traded by the Los Angeles Dodgers to the California Angels for outfielder Reggie Williams. James pitched in the Angels organization from 1994 to 1999 where he achieved his most success as a relief pitcher. He appeared in a total of 184 games with the Angels and compiled a 13–10 record with 9 saves and 3.42 ERA.

James was released by the Angels on September 7, 1999, and did not pitch that year as he had elbow and shoulder surgery.

=== St. Louis Cardinals ===
On October 15, 1999, James signed with the St. Louis Cardinals. In 2000, he pitched in 51 games and had a 2–2 record with 2 saves, 3.16 ERA, in 51.1 innings pitched. He became a free agent on November 5, 2001.

=== Colorado Rockies ===
On January 29, 2002, James signed with the Colorado Rockies.
