= Washington Nationals all-time roster =

List of baseball players

The following is a list of players, both past and current, who appeared at least in one game for the Washington Nationals National League franchise (2005–present), also known previously as the Montreal Expos (1969–2004).

Players in Bold are members of the National Baseball Hall of Fame.

Players in Italics have had their numbers retired by the team.

== A ==
- Fernando Abad
- Cory Abbott
- CJ Abrams
- Winston Abreu
- Austin Adams
- Matt Adams
- Riley Adams
- Joan Adon
- Ehire Adrianza
- Jonathan Albaladejo
- Matt Albers
- Santo Alcalá
- Scott Aldred
- Mike Aldrete
- Jorge Alfaro
- Bernie Allen
- Bill Almon
- Héctor Almonte
- Felipe Alou
- Moisés Alou
- Jake Alu
- Andrew Alvarez
- Tavo Alvarez
- Marlon Anderson
- Scott Anderson
- Shane Andrews
- Rick Ankiel
- Luis Aquino
- Victor Arano
- Tony Armas Jr.
- Humberto Arteaga
- Pedro Astacio
- Luis Atilano
- Bill Atkinson
- Derek Aucoin
- Alex Avila
- Luis Avilan
- Bobby Ayala
- Luis Ayala

== B ==
- Mike Bacsik
- Dakota Bacus
- Carlos Baerga
- Stan Bahnsen
- Bob Bailey
- Darren Baker
- Alberto Baldonado
- Collin Balester
- Anthony Banda
- Bret Barberie
- Josh Bard
- Greg Bargar
- Brian Barnes
- Jacob Barnes
- Matt Barnes
- Skeeter Barnes
- Kyle Barraclough
- Tres Barrera
- Aaron Barrett
- Michael Barrett
- Tim Barrett
- Tony Barron
- Randy Bass
- John Bateman
- Miguel Batista
- Tony Batista
- Rafael Bautista
- Clayton Beeter
- Joe Beimel
- Matt Belisle
- Josh Bell
- Juan Bell
- Ronnie Belliard
- Rigo Beltrán
- Francis Beltrán
- Freddie Benavides
- Yamil Benítez
- Gary Bennett
- Shayne Bennett
- Chad Bentz
- Peter Bergeron
- Jason Bergmann
- Roger Bernadina
- Tony Bernazard
- Sean Berry
- Rocky Biddle
- Larry Biittner
- Dann Bilardello
- Jake Bird
- Joe Bisenius
- Brian Bixler
- Tim Blackwell
- Dennis Blair
- Tony Blanco
- Matt Blank
- Travis Blankenhorn
- Joe Blanton
- Michael Blazek
- Jerry Blevins
- Geoff Blum
- John Boccabella
- Frank Bolick
- Emilio Bonifacio
- Chris Booker
- Aaron Boone
- Don Bosch
- Shawn Boskie
- Kent Bottenfield
- Denis Boucher
- James Bourque
- Micah Bowie
- Oil Can Boyd
- Milton Bradley
- Ron Brand
- Bill Bray
- Ben Braymer
- Hal Breeden
- Fred Breining
- Dan Briggs
- Jim Britton
- Brian Broderick
- Hubie Brooks
- Jim Brower
- Jackie Brown
- Corey Brown
- Curt Brown
- Curtis Brown
- Brian Bruney
- Zach Brzykcy
- Jim Bullinger
- Kirk Bullinger
- Eric Bullock
- Jamie Burke
- Tim Burke
- Sean Burnett
- Ray Burris
- Emmanuel Burriss
- Sal Butera
- Marlon Byrd

== C ==
- Asdrúbal Cabrera
- Daniel Cabrera
- Orlando Cabrera
- Iván Calderón
- Alex Call
- Ron Calloway
- Bill Campbell
- Brett Campbell
- Casey Candaele
- John Candelaria
- Jeimer Candelario
- Matt Capps
- David Carpenter
- Héctor Carrasco
- Don Carrithers
- Brett Carroll
- Jamey Carroll
- **Gary Carter**
- Dave Cash
- Craig Caskey
- Vinny Castilla
- Kory Casto
- Bernie Castro
- Starlin Castro
- Cade Cavalli
- Xavier Cedeño
- Matt Cepicky
- Rick Cerone
- Andrew Chafin
- Andrés Chaparro
- Endy Chávez
- Raúl Chávez
- Michael Chavis
- Bruce Chen
- Matt Chico
- Ryan Church
- Archi Cianfrocco
- Alex Cintrón
- Steve Cishek
- Sam Clay
- Royce Clayton
- Donn Clendenon
- Ty Cline
- Tyler Clippard
- Todd Coffey
- Rich Coggins
- Nate Colbert
- Greg Colbrunn
- A. J. Cole
- Lou Collier
- Kevin Collins
- Tim Collins
- Jesús Colomé
- Bartolo Colón
- Trace Coquillette
- Alex Cora
- Patrick Corbin
- Roy Corcoran
- Chad Cordero
- Jimmy Cordero
- Wil Cordero
- Rhéal Cormier
- Riley Cornelio
- Reid Cornelius
- Tom Cosgrove
- John Costello
- Darron Cox
- Jim Cox
- Dylan Crews
- Warren Cromartie
- Wil Crowe
- Terry Crowley
- Deivi Cruz
- Nelson Cruz
- Yovanny Cruz
- Darwin Cubillán

== D ==
- John D'Acquisto
- Omar Daal
- Vic Darensbourg
- Ron Darling
- Jack Daugherty
- Erik Davis
- J. J. Davis
- Willie Davis
- **Andre Dawson**
- Boots Day
- Zach Day
- Alejandro de Aza
- Rick DeHart
- David DeJesus
- Tomás de la Rosa
- José DeLeón
- Abel De Los Santos
- Don Demola
- Paul DeJong
- Matt den Dekker
- Mark DeRosa
- Delino DeShields
- Ian Desmond
- Ross Detwiler
- Einar Díaz
- Corey Dickerson
- Wilmer Difo
- Bill Dillman
- Miguel Diloné
- Will Dion
- Tom Dixon
- Greg Dobbs
- Sean Doolittle
- John Dopson
- Melvin Dorta
- Jeter Downs
- Scott Downs
- Brian Dozier
- Ryan Drese
- Stephen Drew
- Tim Drew
- Dan Driessen
- Rob Ducey
- Hal Dues
- Zach Duke
- Elijah Dukes
- Adam Dunn
- Steve Dunning
- Jim Dwyer
- Mike Dyer
- Duffy Dyer

== E ==
- Adam Eaton
- Carl Edwards Jr.
- Joey Eischen
- Roenis Elías
- Dave Engle
- Rick Engle
- Jesse English
- Terry Enyart
- Alcides Escobar
- Alex Escobar
- Yunel Escobar
- Paolo Espino
- Danny Espinosa
- Johnny Estrada
- Marco Estrada
- Carl Everett
- Bryan Eversgerd

== F ==
- Roy Face
- Jim Fairey
- Ron Fairly
- Steve Falteisek
- Howard Farmer
- Jeff Fassero
- Erick Fedde
- José Fernández
- Julián Fernández
- Anthony Ferrari
- Jose A. Ferrer
- Robert Fick
- Jeremy Fikac
- Kyle Finnegan
- Jeff Fischer
- Doug Fister
- Mike Fitzgerald
- Darrin Fletcher
- Jesús Flores
- Dylan Floro
- Cliff Floyd
- Doug Flynn
- Tom Foley
- Tim Foli
- Chad Fonville
- Barry Foote
- Harry Ford
- Scott Forster
- Andy Fox
- Lucius Fox
- Maikel Franco
- Terry Francona
- Kevin Frandsen
- Willie Fraser
- Lou Frazier
- Roger Freed
- Sam Freeman
- Steve Frey
- Pepe Frías
- Doug Frobel
- Jerry Fry
- Woodie Fryman
- Mike Fuentes
- Brad Fullmer

== G ==
- Andrés Galarraga
- Joey Gallo
- Víctor Gárate
- Christian Garcia
- Dámaso García
- Luis García
- Luis García Jr.
- Rico Garcia
- Robert Garcia
- Mike Gardiner
- Jeff Gardner
- Mark Gardner
- Mike Garman
- Reed Garrett
- Stone Garrett
- Wayne Garrett
- Mike Gates
- Chad Gaudin
- Bob Gebhard
- Brett Gideon
- Joe Gilbert
- Lucas Giolito
- Koda Glover
- Ed Glynn
- Tyrell Godwin
- Jerry Goff
- Jonny Gomes
- Yan Gomes
- Rene Gonzales
- Alberto Gonzalez
- Alex S. González
- Gio González
- Mike Gonzalez
- Wiki González
- Brian Goodwin
- MacKenzie Gore
- Tom Gorman
- Tom Gorzelanny
- Jim Gosger
- Trevor Gott
- Matt Grace
- Wayne Granger
- Andre Granillo
- Mudcat Grant
- Rick Grapenthin
- Josiah Gray
- Grant Green
- Foster Griffin
- Ross Grimsley
- Marquis Grissom
- Kevin Gross
- Mark Grudzielanek
- Kevin Gryboski
- Javy Guerra
- **Vladimir Guerrero**
- Wilton Guerrero
- José Guillén
- Brad Gulden
- Bill Gullickson
- Jeremy Guthrie
- Cristian Guzmán
- Edwards Guzman

== H ==
- Rich Hacker
- Don Hahn
- Jerry Hairston Jr.
- Scott Hairston
- John Halama
- Drew Hall
- Jeffrey Hammonds
- Brad Hand
- Chris Haney
- Todd Haney
- Gerry Hannahs
- Joel Hanrahan
- Dan Haren
- Brandon Harper
- Bryce Harper
- Ryne Harper
- Brendan Harris
- Gene Harris
- Greg Harris
- Hobie Harris
- Will Harris
- Willie Harris
- Josh Harrison
- Hunter Harvey
- Robert Hassell III
- Ron Hassey
- Heath Haynes
- Neal Heaton
- Bryan Hebson
- Chris Heisey
- Jeremy Hellickson
- Rod Henderson
- Bob Henley
- Butch Henry
- Cole Henry
- Gil Heredia
- Ubaldo Heredia
- Matt Herges
- Dustin Hermanson
- Remy Hermoso
- Anderson Hernández
- César Hernández
- Liván Hernández
- Yadiel Hernández
- José Herrera
- Kelvin Herrera
- Ed Herrmann
- DJ Herz
- Joe Hesketh
- Jack Hiatt
- Derek Hill
- Ken Hill
- Shawn Hill
- Taylor Hill
- Mike Hinckley
- Ray Holbert
- Fred Holdsworth
- Greg Holland
- Brian Holman
- Brock Holt
- Joe Horgan
- Dave Hostetler
- Brady House
- Mike Hubbard
- Rex Hudler
- Daniel Hudson
- Travis Hughes
- Terry Humphrey
- Randy Hunt
- Ron Hunt
- Jonathan Hurst
- Jeff Huson
- Tommy Hutton

== I ==
- Hideki Irabu
- Jake Irvin
- César Izturis
- Maicer Izturis

== J ==
- Damian Jackson
- Edwin Jackson
- Grant Jackson
- Bob James
- Casey Janssen
- Pat Jarvis
- Larry Jaster
- Dan Jennings
- Garry Jestadt
- D'Angelo Jiménez
- Ken Johnson
- Larry Johnson
- Mike Johnson
- Nick Johnson
- **Randy Johnson**
- Reed Johnson
- Ron Johnson
- Roy Johnson
- Tony Johnson
- Wallace Johnson
- Barry Jones
- Jimmy Jones
- Mack Jones *
- Terry Jones
- Tracy Jones
- Taylor Jordan
- Mike Jorgensen
- Jeff Juden

== K ==
- Nathan Karns
- Austin Kearns
- Joe Keener
- Shawn Kelley
- Kenny Kelly
- Roberto Kelly
- Howie Kendrick
- Adam Kennedy
- Logan Kensing
- Jackson Kent
- Zak Kent
- Joe Kerrigan
- Carter Kieboom
- Spencer Kieboom
- Sun-Woo Kim
- Cole Kimball
- Ray King
- Brandon Kintzler
- Clay Kirby
- Steve Kline
- Gabe Klobosits
- Randy Knorr
- Eric Knott
- Darold Knowles
- Jeff Kobernus
- Max Kranick
- Wayne Krenchicki
- Ian Krol
- Matt Krook
- Bill Krueger
- Chad Kuhl

== L ==
- Josh Labandeira
- Coco Laboy
- Tim Laker
- Larry Landreth
- Bill Landrum
- Chip Lang
- Ryan Langerhans
- Mark Langston
- John Lannan
- Mike Lansing
- Sauryn Lao
- Andry Lara
- Yovanny Lara
- Adam LaRoche
- Bill Laskey
- Joe La Sorsa
- Mat Latos
- Derek Law
- Vance Law
- Tom Lawless
- Justin Lawrence (baseball)
- Charlie Lea
- Matt LeCroy
- Wilfredo Ledezma
- Bill Lee
- Evan Lee
- Ron LeFlore
- Dave Leiper
- Mark Leiter
- Denny Lemaster
- Sandy León
- Randy Lerch
- Jon Lester
- Brad Lidge
- Jeff Liefer
- Daylen Lile
- Ted Lilly
- Adam Lind
- Larry Lintz
- Trey Lipscomb
- Felipe Lira
- Zack Littell
- Bryan Little
- Scott Livingstone
- Graeme Lloyd
- Esteban Loaiza
- Paul Lo Duca
- José Lobatón
- Kyle Lobstein
- Nook Logan
- George Lombard
- Steve Lombardozzi Jr.
- Bill Long
- Brian Looney
- Felipe López
- Jorge López
- Luis Lopez
- Reynaldo López
- Brad Lord
- Ryan Loutos
- Richard Lovelady
- Nathaniel Lowe
- Gary Lucas
- Jonathan Lucroy
- Urbano Lugo
- Rob Lukachyk
- Steve Lyons
- Jim Lyttle

== M ==
- Mike MacDougal
- Ken Macha
- Andrés Machado
- Robert Machado
- José Macías
- Pete Mackanin
- Rob Mackowiak
- Mike Maddux
- Ryan Madson
- Mickey Mahler
- Rick Mahler
- Gary Majewski
- Carlos Maldonado
- Bob Malloy
- Pepe Mangual
- Charlie Manning
- Julio Manón
- Fred Manrique
- Barry Manuel
- Jerry Manuel
- Leo Marentette
- Jason Marquis
- Chris Marrero
- Oreste Marrero
- Mike Marshall
- J. D. Martin
- Rafael Martin
- Dave Martínez
- Dennis Martínez
- Manny Martínez
- **Pedro Martinez**
- Sandy Martínez
- Shairon Martis
- Clyde Mashore
- Jim Mason
- Henry Mateo
- Luis Matos
- Troy Mattes
- Ryan Mattheus
- Justin Maxwell
- Derrick May
- Rudy May
- Yunesky Maya
- Matt Maysey
- Ernie McAnally
- Tim McCarver
- Bob McClure
- Dave McDonald
- Will McEnaney
- Andy McGaffigan
- Jake McGee
- Dan McGinn *
- Kyle McGowin
- Ryan McGuire
- Tim McIntosh
- Nate McLouth
- Dave McNally
- Curtis Mead
- Sam Mejías
- Mark Melancon
- Kevin Mench
- Joey Meneses
- Orlando Mercado
- Orlando Merced
- José Mercedes
- Jordy Mercer
- Hensley Meulens
- Miles Mikolas
- Drew Millas
- Lastings Milledge
- Justin Miller
- Randy Miller
- Randy Milligan
- Brad Mills
- John Milner
- Tommy Milone
- Ryan Minor
- Garrett Mock
- Dale Mohorcic
- John Montague
- Willie Montañez
- Miguel Montero
- Charlie Montoyo
- Luke Montz
- Balor Moore
- Bill Moore
- Trey Moore
- Tyler Moore
- David Moraga
- José Morales
- Yohandy Morales
- Mike Mordecai
- Nyjer Morgan
- Mike Morse
- Carl Morton *
- Guillermo Mota
- Manny Mota *
- James Mouton
- Arnie Muñoz
- Bobby Muñoz
- Daniel Murphy
- Patrick Murphy
- Dale Murray

== N ==
- Chris Nabholz
- Xavier Nady
- Bob Natal
- Graig Nettles
- Al Newman
- Reid Nichols
- Steve Nicosia
- Tom Nieto
- Wil Nieves
- C. J. Nitkowski
- Laynce Nix
- Otis Nixon
- Junior Noboa
- Sean Nolin
- Jake Noll
- Dan Norman
- Fred Norman
- Nelson Norman
- Jim Northrup
- Nasim Nuñez
- Talmadge Nunnari
- Rich Nye

== O ==
- Mike O'Berry
- Charlie O'Brien
- Jack O'Connor
- Mike O'Connor
- John O'Donoghue
- Shinnosuke Ogasawara
- Troy O'Leary
- Tom O'Malley
- Sherman Obando
- Rowland Office
- Tomo Ohka
- Ross Ohlendorf
- Al Oliver
- Scott Olsen
- Pete Orr
- Joe Orsulak
- Abimelec Ortiz
- Ramón Ortiz
- Keith Osik
- Antonio Osuna
- Bob Owchinko
- Spike Owen

== P ==
- Alex Pacheco
- Jorge Padilla
- Joshua Palacios
- David Palmer
- Carson Palmquist
- José Paniagua
- Jonathan Papelbon
- Stan Papi
- Johnny Paredes
- Mitchell Parker
- Gerardo Parra
- Jeff Parrett
- Larry Parrish
- Val Pascucci
- Bob Pate
- Corey Patterson
- John Patterson
- Carl Pavano
- Brad Peacock
- Wily Mo Peña
- Luis Perales
- Joel Peralta
- Beltrán Pérez
- Carlos Pérez
- Cionel Pérez
- Eury Pérez
- Francisco Pérez
- Hernán Pérez
- Odalis Pérez
- Óliver Pérez
- Pascual Pérez
- Robert Pérez
- **Tony Pérez**
- Ryan Perry
- Chris Peters
- Yusmeiro Petit
- Marty Pevey
- Ken Phelps
- Adolfo Phillips
- Mike Phillips
- Doug Piatt
- Konnor Pilkington
- Andrew Pinckney
- Israel Pineda
- Luis Pineda
- Gerry Pirtle
- Colin Poche
- Jim Poole
- PJ Poulin
- Alonzo Powell
- Jeremy Powell
- Curtis Pride

== Q ==
- Jim Qualls

== R ==
- Ryan Raburn
- Dick Radatz
- **Tim Raines**
- Tanner Rainey
- Erasmo Ramírez
- Harold Ramírez
- Santiago Ramírez
- Bobby Ramos
- Wilson Ramos
- Mike Ramsey
- Darrell Rasner
- Steve Ratzer
- Jon Rauch
- Claude Raymond
- Raudy Read
- Randy Ready
- Britt Reames
- Jeff Reardon
- Tim Redding
- Bob Reece
- Darren Reed
- Howie Reed
- Jeff Reed
- Jakson Reetz
- Anthony Rendon
- Steve Renko
- Michael Restovich
- Ben Revere
- Gilberto Reyes
- Bob Reynolds
- Mark Reynolds
- Matt Reynolds
- Orlando Ribalta
- Nikco Riesgo
- Brad Rigby
- George Riley
- Bill Risley
- Bombo Rivera
- Juan Rivera
- Luis Rivera
- René Rivera
- Saúl Rivera
- Tanner Roark
- Bert Roberge
- Jerry Robertson
- Clint Robinson
- Víctor Robles
- Fernando Rodney
- Félix Rodríguez
- **Iván Rodríguez**
- Henry Rodríguez (OF)
- Henry Rodríguez (P)
- Jefry Rodríguez
- Gary Roenicke
- Josh Rogers
- Steve Rogers
- Mel Rojas
- Tom Romano
- Enny Romero
- Jhon Romero
- Seth Romero
- Tommy Romero
- Gene Roof
- Pat Rooney
- Jorge Roque
- Amed Rosario
- Eddie Rosario
- Pete Rose
- Trevor Rosenthal
- Joe Ross
- Kirk Rueter
- Keibert Ruiz
- Scott Ruskin
- Blake Rutherford
- Jackson Rutledge
- Marc Rzepczynski

== S ==
- Ángel Salazar
- Eduardo Salazar
- Bill Sampen
- Brian Sanches
- Aaron Sanchez
- Adrián Sánchez
- Aníbal Sánchez
- Scott Sanderson
- Julio Santana
- F. P. Santangelo
- Nelson Santovenia
- Rich Sauveur
- Bob Scanlan
- Pat Scanlon
- Dan Schatzeder
- Fred Scherman
- Max Scherzer
- Nate Schierholtz
- Curt Schmidt
- Dave Schmidt
- Brian Schneider
- Chris Schroder
- Rick Schu
- Paxton Schultz
- Kyle Schwarber
- Mickey Scott
- Rodney Scott
- Tim Scott
- Tony Scott
- Bob Sebra
- Zack Segovia
- David Segui
- Fernando Seguignol
- Carroll Sembera
- Nick Senzel
- Scott Service
- Atahualpa Severino
- Pedro Severino
- Don Shaw *
- Jeff Shaw
- Steve Shea
- Steven Shell
- Razor Shines
- Rick Short
- Joe Siddall
- Moises Sierra
- Dave Silvestri
- Doug Simons
- Jason Simontacchi
- Jared Simpson
- Lucas Sims
- Jack Sinclair
- Ken Singleton
- Tony Sipp
- Matt Skrmetta
- Doug Slaten
- Terrmel Sledge
- J. D. Smart
- Bryn Smith
- Chris Smith
- Dan Smith
- Dominic Smith
- **Lee Smith**
- Mark Smith
- Mike Smith
- Zane Smith
- Chris Snelling
- Tony Solaita
- Jhonatan Solano
- Sammy Solis
- Lary Sorensen
- Alfonso Soriano
- Rafael Soriano
- Michael Soroka
- Elías Sosa
- Jorge Sosa
- Juan Soto
- Steven Souza Jr.
- Denard Span
- Joe Sparma
- Tim Spehr
- Chris Speier
- Levale Speigner
- Sean Spencer
- Junior Spivey
- Randy St. Claire
- Marv Staehle
- Matt Stairs
- Craig Stammen
- Don Stanhouse
- Andy Stankiewicz
- Mike Stanton
- Rusty Staub
- John Stefero
- Mike Stenhouse
- Lee Stevens
- Andrew Stevenson
- Scott Stewart
- Bob Stinson
- Bill Stoneman
- Drew Storen
- Da Rond Stovall
- Chris Stowers
- Doug Strange
- Dee Strange-Gordon
- Stephen Strasburg
- Hunter Strickland
- Scott Strickland
- John Strohmayer
- C.J. Stubbs
- Everett Stull
- Wander Suero
- Gary Sutherland
- Kurt Suzuki
- Stan Swanson
- Ron Swoboda

== T ==
- John Tamargo
- Tony Tarasco
- Fernando Tatís
- Julián Tavárez
- Frank Taveras
- Willy Taveras
- Chuck Taylor
- Michael A. Taylor
- Wilfredo Tejada
- Anthony Telford
- José Tena
- Jeff Terpko
- Jackson Tetreault
- Eric Thames
- J. J. Thobe
- Derrel Thomas
- Lane Thomas
- Jason Thompson
- Mason Thompson
- Rich Thompson
- Scot Thompson
- Andre Thornton
- Matt Thornton
- Mike Thurman
- Jay Tibbs
- Erik Tolman
- Dave Tomlin
- Carlos Torres
- Héctor Torres
- Salomón Torres
- Mike Torrez
- Billy Traber
- Andy Tracy
- Chad Tracy
- Jeff Treadway
- Blake Treinen
- Manny Trillo
- Chris Truby
- T. J. Tucker
- Jacob Turner
- Trea Turner
- Wayne Twitchell

== U ==
- Dan Uggla
- Del Unser
- Ugueth Urbina

== V ==
- Mike Vail
- Marc Valdes
- Sergio Valdéz
- Ellis Valentine
- Yohanny Valera
- John Vander Wal
- Claudio Vargas
- Ildemaro Vargas
- Gus Varland
- Felipe Vázquez
- Javier Vázquez
- Max Venable
- Jonny Venters
- Mike Vento
- Dave Veres
- José Vidro
- Ron Villone
- Joe Vitiello
- Jorbit Vivas
- Luke Voit
- Ed Vosberg
- Austin Voth

== W ==
- Ryan Wagner
- David Wainhouse
- Ken Waldichuk
- Matt Waldron
- **Larry Walker**
- Tom Walker
- Tyler Walker
- Tim Wallach
- Zach Walters
- Bruce Walton
- Chien-Ming Wang
- Daryle Ward
- Thaddeus Ward
- Dan Warthen
- U L Washington
- Gary Waslewski
- Brandon Watson
- Lenny Webster
- Mitch Webster
- Jordan Weems
- Mike Wegener
- Kip Wells
- Chris Welsh
- Jayson Werth
- John Wetteland
- Derrick White
- Gabe White
- Jerry White
- Matt White
- Rondell White
- Fred Whitfield
- Floyd Wicker
- Chris Widger
- Tom Wieghaus
- Joey Wiemer
- Matt Wieters
- Brad Wilkerson
- Jerry Willard
- Austen Williams
- Earl Williams
- Jerome Williams
- Kenny Williams
- Trevor Williams
- Amos Willingham
- Josh Willingham
- Maury Wills
- Cody Wilson
- Josh Wilson
- Preston Wilson
- Jesse Winker
- Bobby Wine
- Herm Winningham
- Jim Wohlford
- James Wood
- Ted Wood
- Ron Woods
- George Wright

== Y ==
- Eddy Yean
- Juan Yepez
- Masato Yoshii
- Ned Yost
- Floyd Youmans
- Dmitri Young
- Jacob Young
- Pete Young
- Tim Young
- Joel Youngblood

== Z ==
- Todd Zeile
- Ryan Zimmerman
- Jordan Zimmermann
