= 2000 Montreal Expos season =

2000 Montreal Expos
- League: National League
- Division: East
- Ballpark: Olympic Stadium
- City: Montreal
- Record: 67–95
- Divisional place: 4th
- Owners: Jeffrey Loria
- General managers: Jim Beattie
- Managers: Felipe Alou
- Television: RDS Network (Rodger Brulotte)
- Radio: (Internet Only) (Dave Van Horne, Joe Cannon) CKAC (AM) (Jacques Doucet, Rodger Brulotte, Claude Raymond, Alain Chantelois)

The 2000 Montreal Expos season was the 32nd season in franchise history.

== Offseason ==
- February 4, 2000: Charlie O'Brien was signed as a free agent with the Montreal Expos.
- March 17, 2000: Ted Lilly was sent by the Montreal Expos to the New York Yankees to complete an earlier deal made on December 22, 1999. The Montreal Expos sent players to be named later and Jake Westbrook to the New York Yankees for Hideki Irabu. The Montreal Expos sent Ted Lilly (March 17, 2000) and Christian Parker (March 22, 2000) to the New York Yankees to complete the trade.

== Spring training ==
In 2000, the Expos held spring training at Roger Dean Stadium in Jupiter, Florida, a facility they shared with the St. Louis Cardinals. It was their third season there.

== Regular season ==
=== Season standings ===
NL East
Team	W	L	Pct.	GB	Home	Road
Atlanta Braves	95	67	.586	—	51‍–‍30	44‍–‍37
New York Mets	94	68	.580	1	55‍–‍26	39‍–‍42
Florida Marlins	79	82	.491	15½	43‍–‍38	36‍–‍44
Montreal Expos	67	95	.414	28	37‍–‍44	30‍–‍51
Philadelphia Phillies	65	97	.401	30	34‍–‍47	31‍–‍50

=== Record vs. opponents ===
2000 National League record Source: NL Standings Head-to-Head
Team	AZ	ATL	CHC	CIN	COL	FLA	HOU	LAD	MIL	MON	NYM	PHI	PIT	SD	SF	STL	AL
Arizona	—	3–6	5–4	2–5	7–6	4–5	6–1	7–6	4–5	4–5	2–7	8–1	7–2	9–4	6–7	5–4	6–9
Atlanta	6–3	—	4–5	2–5	5–4	6–6	5–4	7–2	6–3	6–7	7–6	8–5	5–2	8–1	6–3	3–4	11–7
Chicago	4–5	5–4	—	4–8	4–5	1–6	5–7	3–6	6–7	4–5	2–5	6–3	3–9	3–5	4–5	3–10	8–7
Cincinnati	5–2	5–2	8–4	—	6–3	3–6	7–5	4–5	5–8–1	6–3	5–4	3–4	7–6	4–5	3–6	7–6	7–8
Colorado	6–7	4–5	5–4	3–6	—	4–5	5–4	4–9	4–5	7–2	3–6	6–3	7–2	7–6	6–7	5–3	6–6
Florida	5–4	6–6	6–1	6–3	5–4	—	3–5	2–7	3–4	7–6	6–6	9–4	5–4	2–7	3–6	3–6	8–9
Houston	1–6	4–5	7–5	5–7	4–5	5–3	—	3–6	7–6	4–5	2–5	5–4	10–3	2–7	1–8	6–6	6–9
Los Angeles	6–7	2–7	6–3	5–4	9–4	7–2	6–3	—	3–4	5–3	4–5	5–4	4–5	8–5	7–5	3–6	6–9
Milwaukee	5–4	3–6	7–6	8–5–1	5–4	4–3	6–7	4–3	—	4–5	2–7	2–5	7–5	2–7	3–6	5–7	6–9
Montreal	5–4	7–6	5–4	3–6	2–7	6–7	5–4	3–5	5–4	—	3–9	5–7	3–4	3–6	3–6	2–5	7–11
New York	7–2	6–7	5–2	4–5	6–3	6–6	5–2	5–4	7–2	9–3	—	6–7	7–2	3–6	3–5	6–3	9–9
Philadelphia	1–8	5–8	3–6	4–3	3–6	4–9	4–5	4–5	5–2	7–5	7–6	—	3–6	2–5	2–7	2–7	9–9
Pittsburgh	2–7	2–5	9–3	6–7	2–7	4–5	3–10	5–4	5–7	4–3	2–7	6–3	—	7–2	2–6	4–8	6–9
San Diego	4–9	1–8	5–3	5–4	6–7	7–2	7–2	5–8	7–2	6–3	6–3	5–2	2–7	—	5–7	0–9	5–10
San Francisco	7–6	3–6	5–4	6–3	7–6	6–3	8–1	5–7	6–3	6–3	5–3	7–2	6–2	7–5	—	5–4	8–7
St. Louis	4–5	4–3	10–3	6–7	3–5	6–3	6–6	6–3	7–5	5–2	3–6	7–2	8–4	9–0	4–5	—	7–8

Expos vs. American League
Team	AL East				
Team	BAL	BOS	NYY	TB	TOR
**Montreal**	3–0	0–3	1–2	1–2	2–4

=== Notable transactions ===
- June 5, 2000: Grady Sizemore was drafted by the Montreal Expos in the 3rd round of the 2000 amateur draft. Player signed June 16, 2000.
- June 5, 2000: Cliff Lee was drafted by the Montreal Expos in the 4th round of the 2000 amateur draft. Player signed July 6, 2000.
- June 5, 2000: Jason Bay was drafted by the Montreal Expos in the 22nd round of the 2000 amateur draft. Player signed June 16, 2000.
- June 22, 2000: Charlie O'Brien was released by the Montreal Expos.
- September 28, 2000: Terrmel Sledge was sent by the Seattle Mariners to the Montreal Expos to complete an earlier deal made on August 8, 2000. The Seattle Mariners sent players to be named later to the Montreal Expos for players to be named later and Chris Widger. The Seattle Mariners sent Sean Spencer (August 10, 2000) and Terrmel Sledge (September 28, 2000) to the Montreal Expos to complete the trade.

=== Roster ===
2000 Montreal Expos
**Roster**
**Pitchers**: 51 Tony Armas Jr.; 48 Miguel Batista; 84 Matt Blank; 48 Scott Downs; 51 Scott Forster; 30 Dustin Hermanson; 14 Hideki Irabu; 47 Mike Johnson; 44 Steve Kline; 57 Yovanny Lara; 43 Felipe Lira; 29 Trey Moore; 48 David Moraga; 40 Guillermo Mota; 45 Carl Pavano; 48 Jim Poole; 49 Jeremy Powell; 31 Brad Rigby; 54 Julio Santana; 53 Matt Skrmetta; 53 Sean Spencer; 51 Scott Strickland; 32 Anthony Telford; 35 Mike Thurman; 52 T. J. Tucker; 41 Ugueth Urbina; 23 Javier Vázquez	**Catchers**: 21 Charlie O'Brien; 63 Brian Schneider; 58 Yohanny Valera; 15 Lenny Webster; 16 Chris Widger; **Infielders**: 5 Michael Barrett; 50 Geoff Blum; 18 Orlando Cabrera; 53 Trace Coquillette; 59 Tomas de la Rosa; 12 Mike Mordecai; 61 Talmadge Nunnari; 46 Andy Tracy; 3 José Vidro	**Outfielders**: 33 Peter Bergeron; 54 Milton Bradley; 27 Vladimir Guerrero; 4 Wilton Guerrero; 1 Terry Jones; 19 Fernando Seguignol; 22 Rondell White	**Manager**: 17 Felipe Alou; **Coaches**: 38 Brad Arnsberg (Bullpen, pitching) (Promoted to Pitching Coach on July 20, 2000); 67 Pierre Arsenault (Bullpen); 26 Bobby Cuellar (Pitching) (Fired on July 20, 2000); 7 Perry Hill (First base); 25 Pete Mackanin (Third base); 55 Luis Pujols (Bench); 6 Pat Roessler (Hitting)

=== Game log ===
Legend
	Expos win
	Expos loss
	Postponement
**Bold**	Expos team member

2000 game log
April (14–9)

#	Date	Opponent	Score	Win	Loss	Save	Attendance	Record
1	April 3	Dodgers	4–10	Brown (1–0)	**Hermanson** (0–1)	Adams (1)	51,249	0–1
2	April 4	Dodgers	4–10	Park (1–0)	**Irabu** (0–1)	—	12,143	0–2
3	April 5	Dodgers	6–5	**Telford** (1–0)	Shaw (0–1)	—	8,867	1–2
4	April 6	Dodgers	11–3	**Pavano** (1–0)	Pérez (0–1)	—	9,121	2–2
5	April 7	Padres	5–10	Meadows (1–0)	**Powell** (0–1)	—	12,260	2–3
6	April 8	Padres	10–9	**Telford** (2–0)	Wall (0–1)	**Urbina** (1)	13,528	3–3
7	April 9	Padres	2–1	**Irabu** (1–1)	Boehringer (0–1)	**Urbina** (2)	9,782	4–3
8	April 11	@ Pirates	7–3	**Vázquez** (1–0)	Benson (0–2)	**Kline** (1)	11,335	5–3
9	April 12	@ Pirates	4–6	Silva (1–0)	**Batista** (0–1)	Williams (1)	10,290	5–4
10	April 13	@ Pirates	3–4	Silva (2–0)	**Urbina** (0–1)	—	11,162	5–5
11	April 14	@ Phillies	4–0	**Hermanson** (1–1)	Brock (0–2)	—	12,366	6–5
—	April 15	@ Phillies	Postponed (rain): Rescheduled for September 11.					
12	April 16	@ Phillies	4–5	Aldred (1–1)	**Telford** (1–2)	—	18,648	6–6
—	April 17	@ Phillies	Postponed (rain): Rescheduled for September 11 as part of a doubleheader.					
13	April 18	Cubs	4–3	**Strickland** (1–0)	Tapani (0–2)	**Urbina** (3)	9,975	7–6
14	April 19	Cubs	7–3	**Pavano** (2–0)	Quevedo (0–2)	—	10,112	8–6
15	April 20	Cubs	6–10	Williams (1–0)	**Blank** (0–1)	—	12,186	8–7
16	April 21	Brewers	5–1	**Hermanson** (2–1)	Haynes (2–1)	**Urbina** (4)	12,315	9–7
17	April 22	Brewers	3–7	Stull (1–1)	**Irabu** (1–2)	—	14,461	9–8
18	April 23	Brewers	6–4	**Vázquez** (2–0)	Navarro (0–4)	**Urbina** (5)	14,410	10–8
19	April 25	Rockies	10–4	**Pavano** (3–0)	Bohanon (0–2)	—	10,019	11–8
20	April 26	Rockies	9–2	**Hermanson** (3–1)	Jarvis (1–1)	**Urbina** (6)	10,735	12–8
21	April 28	@ Giants	9–3	**Telford** (3–1)	Ortiz (2–3)	—	40,930	13–8
22	April 29	@ Giants	1–2	Johnstone (2–1)	**Telford** (3–2)	Nen (4)	40,930	13–9
23	April 30	@ Giants	4–3	**Strickland** (2–0)	Johnstone (2–2)	**Urbina** (7)	40,930	14–9

May (12–14)

#	Date	Opponent	Score	Win	Loss	Save	Attendance	Record
24	May 1	@ Rockies	8–15	White (1–0)	**Hermanson** (3–2)	—	35,104	14–10
25	May 2	@ Rockies	6–12	Karl (1–2)	**Powell** (0–2)	—	39,132	14–11
26	May 3	@ Rockies	7–16	Astacio (3–2)	**Irabu** (1–3)	—	40,096	14–12
27	May 5	@ Brewers	10–2	**Vázquez** (3–0)	Bere (2–3)	—	10,002	15–12
28	May 6	@ Brewers	3–2	**Telford** (4–2)	Weathers (2–1)	**Urbina** (8)	12,381	16–12
29	May 7	@ Brewers	4–9	Haynes (4–2)	**Hermanson** (3–3)	—	11,989	16–13
—	May 8	Phillies	Postponed (rain): Rescheduled for May 11.					
30	May 9	Phillies	3–2 (10)	**Kline** (1–0)	Gomes (1–3)	—	8,845	17–13
31	May 10	Phillies	0–8	Person (3–1)	**Vázquez** (3–1)	—	9,411	17–14
32	May 11	Phillies	4–6	Wolf (2–2)	**Pavano** (3–1)	Gomes (6)	8,311	17–15
33	May 12	Cubs	8–3	**Thurman** (1–0)	Wood (1–2)	**Hermanson** (1)	15,626	18–15
34	May 13	Cubs	1–2	Lieber (4–2)	**Armas** (0–1)	—	14,321	18–16
35	May 14	Cubs	16–15	**Hermanson** (4–3)	Aguilera (1–1)	—	10,621	19–16
36	May 16	Diamondbacks	2–0	**Vázquez** (4–1)	Johnson (7–1)	**Hermanson** (2)	11,898	20–16
37	May 17	Diamondbacks	10–2	**Pavano** (4–1)	Reynoso (2–4)	—	8,766	21–16
38	May 18	Diamondbacks	6–8	Kim (2–1)	**Telford** (4–3)	—	11,073	21–17
39	May 19	Astros	3–2	**Hermanson** (5–3)	Slusarski (0–1)	—	12,679	22–17
40	May 20	Astros	8–7	**Irabu** (2–3)	Elarton (2–1)	**Hermanson** (3)	15,166	23–17
41	May 21	Astros	8–3	**Vázquez** (5–1)	Lima (1–7)	—	20,111	24–17
42	May 23	@ Giants	3–2	**Pavano** (5–1)	Rueter (2–3)	**Hermanson** (4)	40,930	25–17
43	May 24	@ Giants	0–18	Estes (3–2)	**Thurman** (1–1)	—	40,930	25–18
44	May 25	@ Giants	1–4	Hernández (3–5)	**Armas** (0–2)	Nen (7)	40,930	25–19
45	May 26	@ Padres	2–6	Whiteside (2–0)	**Irabu** (2–4)	—	19,517	25–20
46	May 27	@ Padres	2–4	Wall (2–2)	**Kline** (1–1)	Hoffman (10)	40,110	25–21
47	May 28	@ Padres	3–4	Walker (1–0)	**Pavano** (5–2)	Hoffman (11)	26,411	25–22
48	May 30	@ Reds	2–4	Fernández (2–0)	**Armas** (0–3)	Williamson (6)	20,250	25–23
49	May 31	@ Reds	10–4	**Johnson** (1–0)	Parris (2–7)	—	21,207	26–23

June (12–14)

#	Date	Opponent	Score	Win	Loss	Save	Attendance	Record
50	June 1	@ Reds	9–7	**Vázquez** (6–1)	Villone (6–2)	**Kline** (2)	23,099	27–23
51	June 2	Orioles	5–3	**Pavano** (6–2)	Johnson (0–4)	**Kline** (3)	12,654	28–23
52	June 3	Orioles	7–4	**Lira** (1–0)	Rapp (4–3)	**Kline** (4)	13,628	29–23
53	June 4	Orioles	1–0	**Armas** (1–3)	Ponson (3–3)	**Kline** (5)	15,181	30–23
54	June 5	Yankees	6–4	**Johnson** (2–0)	Cone (1–6)	**Kline** (6)	18,095	31–23
55	June 6	Yankees	1–8	Grimsley (2–1)	**Vázquez** (6–2)	—	24,453	31–24
56	June 7	Yankees	2–7	Hernández (6–4)	**Pavano** (6–3)	—	25,381	31–25
57	June 9	@ Blue Jays	3–13	Carpenter (5–5)	**Tucker** (0–1)	—	26,122	31–26
58	June 10	@ Blue Jays	11–2	**Armas** (2–3)	Escobar (5–7)	—	30,239	32–26
59	June 11	@ Blue Jays	3–8	Koch (4–1)	**Mota** (0–1)	—	25,838	32–27
60	June 12	@ Brewers	1–8	Bere (4–5)	**Vázquez** (6–3)	—	16,686	32–28
61	June 13	@ Brewers	9–4	**Pavano** (7–3)	Woodard (1–5)	—	10,705	33–28
62	June 14	@ Brewers	2–11	Wright (2–1)	**Johnson** (2–1)	—	12,875	33–29
63	June 16	@ Cubs	8–9	Van Poppel (2–2)	**Armas** (2–4)	Aguilera (14)	38,010	33–30
64	June 17	@ Cubs	0–1	Rain (1–0)	**Hermanson** (5–4)	Aguilera (15)	39,502	33–31
65	June 18	@ Cubs	4–3 (11)	**Telford** (5–3)	Garibay (1–3)	**Rigby** (2)	38,752	34–31
66	June 19	Pirates	2–1	**Pavano** (8–3)	Loiselle (0–2)	**Kline** (7)	7,483	35–31
67	June 20	Pirates	1–2	Benson (6–5)	**Johnson** (2–2)	Williams (10)	8,056	35–32
68	June 21	Pirates	3–8	Córdova (5–5)	**Armas** (2–5)	Peters (1)	8,324	35–33
69	June 22	Pirates	6–5	**Hermanson** (6–4)	Ritchie (4–4)	**Telford** (2)	8,635	36–33
70	June 23	Phillies	6–13	Coggin (1–0)	**Vázquez** (6–4)	—	8,197	36–34
71	June 24	Phillies	1–8	Wolf (7–4)	**Pavano** (8–4)	—	8,374	36–35
72	June 25	Phillies	3–1	**Johnson** (3–2)	Byrd (1–6)	**Kline** (8)	13,164	37–35
73	June 27	Braves	6–4	**Armas** (3–5)	Glavine (7–5)	**Kline** (9)	11,636	38–35
74	June 28	Braves	4–7	Mulholland (8–6)	**Hermanson** (6–5)	Ligtenberg (5)	12,653	38–36
75	June 30	Marlins	4–5	Almanza (1–0)	**Kline** (1–2)	Alfonseca (23)	8,047	38–37

July (9–18)

#	Date	Opponent	Score	Win	Loss	Save	Attendance	Record
76	July 1	Marlins	5–6	Dempster (9–4)	**Johnson** (3–3)	Alfonseca (24)	8,529	38–38
77	July 2	Marlins	1–2	Cornelius (3–2)	**Santana** (0–1)	Alfonseca (25)	9,076	38–39
78	July 3	@ Braves	17–1	**Armas** (4–5)	Mulhollandl (8–8)	—	44,302	39–39
79	July 4	@ Braves	3–7	Maddux (10–3)	**Hermanson** (6–6)	—	47,277	39–40
80	July 5	@ Braves	6–5	**Vázquez** (7–4)	Millwood (5–7)	**Kline** (10)	34,044	40–40
81	July 6	@ Braves	4–2	**Johnson** (4–3)	Burkett (6–4)	**Kline** (11)	36,377	41–40
82	July 7	Blue Jays	10–5	**Lira** (2–0)	Quantrill (0–5)	—	13,317	42–40
83	July 8	Blue Jays	3–6	Wells (15–2)	**Armas** (4–6)	Koch (20)	17,420	42–41
84	July 9	Blue Jays	3–13	Castillo (6–5)	**Hermanson** (6–7)	—	22,489	42–42
**All–Star Break (July 10–12)**
85	July 13	@ Devil Rays	4–6	Mecir (7–1)	**Lira** (2–1)	Hernández (13)	14,924	42–43
86	July 14	@ Devil Rays	5–8	Lopez (6–6)	**Armas** (4–7)	Hernández (14)	15,870	42–44
87	July 15	@ Devil Rays	4–1	**Hermanson** (7–7)	Trachsel (6–9)	**Kline** (12)	19,366	43–44
88	July 16	@ Red Sox	2–5	Wakefield (6–5)	**Johnson** (4–4)	Wasdin (1)	32,164	43–45
89	July 17	@ Red Sox	3–7	Pichardo (4–1)	**Telford** (5–4)	—	32,703	43–46
90	July 18	@ Red Sox	1–3	Martínez (9–4)	**Vázquez** (7–5)	Lowe (21)	32,629	43–47
91	July 19	Mets	3–5	Mahomes (4–1)	**Kline** (1–3)	Benítez (22)	14,198	43–48
92	July 20	Mets	4–1	**Hermanson** (8–7)	Hampton (9–7)	**Strickland** (1)	13,348	44–48
93	July 21	@ Marlins	7–3	**Thurman** (2–1)	Smith (0–3)	—	11,234	45–48
94	July 22	@ Marlins	17–7	**Johnson** (5–4)	Cornelius (3–4)	—	15,476	46–48
95	July 23	@ Marlins	7–6	**Vázquez** (8–5)	Sánchez (6–8)	**Strickland** (2)	11,307	47–48
96	July 25	@ Mets	0–5	Rusch (7–7)	**Hermanson** (8–8)	—	41,028	47–49
—	July 26	@ Mets	Postponed (rain): Rescheduled for July 27 as part of a doubleheader.					
97	July 27 (1)	@ Mets	8–9	Franco (5–3)	**Strickland** (2–1)	Benítez (23)	35,088	47–50
98	July 27 (2)	@ Mets	3–4	Hampton (10–7)	**Irabu** (2–5)	—	35,088	47–51
99	July 28	Reds	3–8	Dessens (5–0)	**Johnson** (5–5)	—	11,547	47–52
100	July 29	Reds	3–4 (11)	Graves (10–0)	**Santana** (0–2)	—	13,577	47–53
101	July 30	Reds	4–7	Bell (5–6)	**Hermanson** (8–9)	Graves (18)	14,495	47–54
102	July 31	Cardinals	0–4	Kile (13–6)	**Thurman** (2–2)	—	9,558	47–55

August (8–20)

#	Date	Opponent	Score	Win	Loss	Save	Attendance	Record
103	August 1	Cardinals	4–0	**Moore** (1–0)	Ankiel (7–7)	—	9,818	48–55
104	August 2	Cardinals	7–10	Hentgen (10–8)	**Johnson** (5–6)	—	9,669	48–56
105	August 4	@ Astros	6–7	Green (1–0)	**Kline** (1–4)	Dotel (5)	38,502	48–57
106	August 5	@ Astros	10–9	**Strickland** (3–1)	Valdes (2–4)	**Kline** (13)	42,399	49–57
107	August 6	@ Astros	1–8	Elarton (12–4)	**Thurman** (2–3)	—	36,882	49–58
108	August 7	@ Diamondbacks	2–5	Schilling (9–6)	**Moore** (1–1)	—	31,526	49–59
109	August 8	@ Diamondbacks	9–3	**Lira** (3–1)	Anderson (9–5)	—	33,113	50–59
110	August 9	@ Diamondbacks	4–3	**Strickland** (4–1)	Guzmán (4–4)	**Telford** (2)	33,500	51–59
111	August 11	Rockies	3–10	Bohanon (6–8)	**Hermanson** (8–10)	—	9,136	51–60
112	August 12	Rockies	2–14	Yoshii (5–12)	**Moore** (1–2)	—	9,815	51–61
113	August 13	Rockies	3–5	Chouinard (1–1)	**Strickland** (4–2)	White (3)	10,606	51–62
114	August 14	Rockies	3–4	House (1–0)	**Strickland** (4–3)	Jiménez (16)	6,924	51–63
115	August 15	Giants	7–9	del Toro (1–0)	**Lira** (3–2)	Nen (29)	7,165	51–64
116	August 16	Giants	1–4	Gardner (8–6)	**Hermanson** (8–11)	Nen (30)	7,910	51–65
117	August 17	Giants	4–5	Estes (12–3)	**Moore** (1–3)	Rodríguez (3)	9,198	51–66
118	August 18	@ Padres	6–3	**Thurman** (3–3)	Clement (11–11)	**Strickland** (3)	20,597	52–66
119	August 19	@ Padres	3–4 (11)	Walker (7–1)	**Santana** (0–3)	—	56,779	52–67
120	August 20	@ Padres	4–5	Witasick (4–9)	**Lira** (3–3)	Hoffman (34)	25,343	52–68
121	August 21	@ Dodgers	4–1	**Hermanson** (9–11)	Herges (8–3)	**Strickland** (4)	32,053	53–68
122	August 22	@ Dodgers	6–14	Adams (6–6)	**Santana** (0–4)	—	29,804	53–69
123	August 23	@ Dodgers	1–5	Brown (11–5)	**Thurman** (3–4)	—	31,337	53–70
124	August 24	@ Dodgers	0–7	Park (13–8)	**Vázquez** (8–6)	—	28,896	53–71
125	August 25	Astros	1–3	Holt (6–12)	**Lira** (3–4)	Dotel (10)	7,636	53–72
126	August 26	Astros	5–4	**Hermanson** (10–11)	Lima (5–15)	**Kline** (14)	8,619	54–72
127	August 27	Astros	3–7	Elarton (15–4)	**Moore** (1–4)	—	10,732	54–73
128	August 28	Diamondbacks	9–5	**Thurman** (4–4)	Schilling (10–9)	**Telford** (3)	6,389	55–73
129	August 29	Diamondbacks	7–8	Plesac (4–4)	**Forster** (0–1)	Mesa (11)	6,029	55–74
130	August 30	Diamondbacks	0–7	Johnson (17–5)	**Lira** (3–5)	—	7,650	55–75

September (12–19)

#	Date	Opponent	Score	Win	Loss	Save	Attendance	Record
131	September 1	@ Reds	2–8	Bell (6–7)	**Hermanson** (10–12)	—	22,973	55–76
132	September 2	@ Reds	9–5	**Lira** (4–5)	Villone (9–8)	—	29,403	56–76
133	September 3	@ Reds	1–8	Parris (10–14)	**Thurman** (4–5)	—	26,152	56–77
134	September 4	@ Cardinals	2–4	Hentgen (14–12)	**Vázquez** (8–7)	Veres (25)	39,704	56–78
135	September 5	@ Cardinals	6–7	Reames (1–1)	**Santana** (0–5)	Timlin (12)	31,821	56–79
136	September 6	@ Cardinals	7–2	**Hermanson** (11–12)	Stephenson (15–8)	—	30,280	57–79
137	September 7	@ Cardinals	1–6	Kile (17–9)	**Armas** (4–8)	—	30,799	57–80
138	September 8	@ Braves	2–3	Ashby (9–12)	**Moore** (1–4)	Rocker (20)	35,870	57–81
139	September 9	@ Braves	7–5 (12)	**Santana** (1–5)	Seelbach (0–1)	—	47,775	58–81
140	September 10	@ Braves	4–0	**Vázquez** (9–7)	Glavine (19–7)	—	39,068	59–81
141	September 11 (1)	@ Phillies	2–5	Politte (3–2)	**Hermanson** (11–13)	Brantley (23)	11,310	59–82
142	September 11 (2)	@ Phillies	7–6	**Mota** (1–1)	Padilla (1–2)	**Strickland** (5)	11,310	60–82
143	September 12	@ Phillies	1–0	**Armas** (5–8)	Telemaco (1–1)	**Strickland** (6)	12,135	61–82
144	September 13	@ Phillies	5–15	Chen (7–2)	**Lira** (4–6)	—	12,316	61–83
145	September 14	Mets	4–10	Rusch (10–10)	**Thurman** (4–6)	—	6,219	61–84
146	September 15	Mets	4–3	**Vázquez** (10–7)	Wendell (7–6)	**Strickland** (7)	6,979	62–84
147	September 16	Mets	4–10	Reed (10–5)	**Hermanson** (11–14)	—	9,045	62–85
148	September 17	Mets	5–0	**Armas** (6–8)	Jones (9–6)	—	9,349	63–85
149	September 18	Marlins	11–4	**Lira** (5–6)	Sánchez (9–11)	—	4,769	64–85
150	September 19	Marlins	1–3	Dempster (13–10)	**Thurman** (4–7)	Alfonseca (42)	5,283	64–86
151	September 20	Marlins	4–2	**Vázquez** (11–7)	Cornelius (3–10)	**Strickland** (8)	5,851	65–86
152	September 21	Marlins	10–3	**Hermanson** (12–14)	Burnett (2–7)	—	4,801	66–86
153	September 22	Braves	6–4	**Armas** (7–8)	Millwood (10–12)	**Strickland** (9)	8,464	67–86
154	September 23	Braves	0–10	Maddux (19–8)	**Lira** (5–7)	—	10,136	67–87
155	September 24	Braves	5–14	Ashby (12–12)	**Thurman** (4–8)	—	11,350	67–88
156	September 25	Braves	0–6	Glavine (20–9)	**Vázquez** (11–8)	—	6,931	67–89
157	September 26	@ Marlins	4–5 (10)	Alfonseca (5–6)	**Kline** (1–5)	—	8,538	67–90
158	September 27	@ Marlins	3–6	Burnett (3–7)	**Armas** (7–9)	Alfonseca (43)	10,269	67–91
159	September 28	@ Marlins	4–7	Penny (8–7)	**Lira** (5–8)	Alfonseca (44)	7,864	67–92
160	September 29	@ Mets	2–11	Hampton (15–10)	**Thurman** (4–9)	—	28,788	67–93
161	September 30	@ Mets	2–4	Wendell (8–6)	**Vázquez** (11–9)	Benítez (41)	39,468	67–94

October (0–1)

#	Date	Opponent	Score	Win	Loss	Save	Attendance	Record
162	October 1	@ Mets	2–3 (13)	Mahomes (5–3)	**Powell** (0–3)	—	44,869	67–95

=== Attendance ===
The Expos drew 926,272 fans at Olympic Stadium during 2000, placing them 16th in attendance for the season among the 16 National League teams. Their highest attendance at a home game occurred on April 3, when they drew an Opening Day crowd of 51,249 for a game against the Los Angeles Dodgers, while the low mark was 4,769 for a game against the Florida Marlins on September 18.

== Player stats ==
= Indicates team leader

=== Batting ===
Note: Pos = Position; G = Games played; AB = At bats; R = Runs scored; H = Hits; 2B = Doubles; 3B = Triples; HR = Home runs; RBI = Runs batted in; AVG = Batting average; SB = Stolen bases

Complete offensive statistics are available here.

Pos	Player	G	AB	R	H	2B	3B	HR	RBI	AVG	SB
C	Chris Widger	86	281	31	67	17	2	12	34	.238	1
1B	Lee Stevens	123	449	60	119	27	2	22	75	.265	0
2B	José Vidro	153	606	101	200	51	2	24	97	.330	5
SS	Orlando Cabrera	125	422	47	100	25	1	13	55	.237	4
3B	Michael Barrett	89	271	28	58	15	1	1	22	.214	0
LF	Rondell White	75	290	52	89	24	0	11	54	.307	5
CF	Peter Bergeron	148	518	80	127	25	7	5	31	.245	11
RF	Vladimir Guerrero	154	571	101	197	28	11	44	123	.345	9
IF	Geoff Blum	124	343	40	97	20	2	11	45	.283	1
LF	Wilton Guerrero	127	288	30	77	7	2	2	23	.267	8
CI	Andy Tracy	83	192	29	50	8	1	11	32	.260	1
3B	Mike Mordecai	86	169	20	48	16	0	4	16	.284	2
OF	Terry Jones	108	168	30	42	8	2	0	13	.250	7
UT	Fernando Seguignol	76	162	22	45	8	0	10	22	.278	0
CF	Milton Bradley	42	154	20	34	8	1	2	15	.221	2
C	Brian Schneider	45	115	6	27	6	0	0	11	.235	0
C	Lenny Webster	39	81	6	17	3	0	0	5	.210	0
SS	Tomas de la Rosa	32	66	7	19	3	1	2	9	.288	2
IF	Trace Coquillette	34	59	6	12	4	0	1	8	.203	0
C	Charlie O'Brien	9	19	1	4	1	0	1	2	.211	0
C	Yohanny Valera	7	10	1	0	0	0	0	1	.000	0
1B	Talmadge Nunnari	18	5	2	1	0	0	0	1	.200	0
P	Javier Vázquez	31	65	4	15	2	0	0	1	.231	0
P	Dustin Hermanson	36	55	1	8	2	0	0	1	.145	0
P	Carl Pavano	15	35	2	5	1	0	0	0	.143	0
P	Mike Thurman	17	24	3	1	0	0	0	0	.042	0
P	Tony Armas Jr.	15	26	1	1	0	0	0	1	.038	0
P	Mike Johnson	39	22	1	4	0	0	0	3	.182	0
P	Felipe Lira	50	19	3	4	0	0	2	3	.211	0
P	Hideki Irabu	11	16	1	2	0	0	0	1	.125	0
P	Trey Moore	8	8	0	1	0	0	0	0	.125	0
P	Julio Santana	35	7	0	0	0	0	0	0	.000	0
P	Jeremy Powell	11	5	1	3	1	0	0	1	.600	0
P	Anthony Telford	61	2	0	0	0	0	0	0	.000	0
P	Scott Strickland	47	2	0	0	0	0	0	0	.000	0
P	Miguel Batista	4	1	0	0	0	0	0	0	.000	0
P	Scott Downs	1	2	0	0	0	0	0	0	.000	0
P	Steve Kline	79	2	0	0	0	0	0	0	.000	0
P	Brad Rigby	6	1	0	0	0	0	0	0	.000	0
P	Matt Blank	13	1	0	0	0	0	0	0	.000	0
P	T. J. Tucker	1	1	1	1	0	0	0	0	1.000	0
P	Guillermo Mota	28	1	0	0	0	0	0	0	.000	0
P	Ugueth Urbina	13	1	0	0	0	0	0	0	.000	0
P	Sean Spencer	8	0	0	0	0	0	0	0	–	0
P	Yovanny Lara	5	0	0	0	0	0	0	0	–	0
P	Scott Forster	39	0	0	0	0	0	0	0	–	0
P	Jim Poole	5	0	0	0	0	0	0	0	–	0
P	David Moraga	2	0	0	0	0	0	0	0	–	0
P	Matt Skrmetta	4	0	0	0	0	0	0	0	–	0
	Team totals	162	5535	738	1475	310	35	178	705	.266	58

=== Pitching ===
Note: Pos = Position; W = Wins; L = Losses; ERA = Earned run average; G = Games pitched; GS = Games started; SV = Saves; IP = Innings pitched; H = Hits allowed; R = Runs allowed; ER = Earned runs allowed; BB = Walks allowed; K = Strikeouts

Complete pitching statistics are available here.

Pos	Player	W	L	ERA	G	GS	SV	IP	H	R	ER	BB	K
SP	Javier Vázquez	11	9	4.05	33	33	0	217.2	247	104	98	61	196
SP	Dustin Hermanson	12	14	4.77	38	30	4	198.0	226	128	105	75	94
SP	Carl Pavano	8	4	3.06	15	15	0	97.0	89	40	33	34	64
SP	Tony Armas Jr.	7	9	4.36	17	17	0	95.0	74	49	46	50	59
SP	Mike Thurman	4	9	6.42	17	17	0	88.1	112	69	63	46	52
SP	Hideki Irabu	2	5	7.24	11	11	0	54.2	77	45	44	14	42
CL	Steve Kline	1	5	3.50	83	0	14	82.1	88	36	32	27	64
RP	Felipe Lira	5	8	5.40	53	7	0	101.2	129	71	61	36	51
RP	Anthony Telford	5	4	3.79	64	0	3	78.1	76	38	33	23	68
RP	Scott Strickland	4	3	3.00	49	0	9	48.0	38	18	16	16	48
RP	Scott Forster	0	1	7.88	42	0	0	32.0	28	31	28	25	23
	Mike Johnson	5	6	6.39	41	13	0	101.1	107	73	72	53	70
	Julio Santana	1	5	5.67	36	4	0	66.2	69	45	42	33	58
	Trey Moore	1	5	6.62	8	8	0	35.1	55	31	26	21	24
	Guillermo Mota	1	1	6.00	29	0	0	30.0	27	21	20	12	24
	Jeremy Powell	0	3	7.96	11	4	0	26.0	35	27	23	9	19
	Matt Blank	0	1	5.14	13	0	0	14.0	12	8	8	5	4
	Ugueth Urbina	0	1	4.05	13	0	8	13.1	11	6	6	5	22
	Miguel Batista	0	1	14.04	4	0	0	18.1	19	14	13	3	7
	T. J. Tucker	0	1	11.57	2	2	0	7.0	11	9	9	3	2
	Sean Spencer	0	0	5.40	8	0	0	6.2	7	4	4	3	6
	Yovanny Lara	0	0	6.35	6	0	0	5.2	5	4	4	8	3
	Brad Rigby	0	0	5.06	6	0	1	5.1	8	5	3	3	2
	Matt Skrmetta	0	0	15.19	6	0	0	5.1	6	10	9	6	4
	Scott Downs	0	0	9.00	1	1	0	3.0	5	3	3	3	0
	Jim Poole	0	0	27.00	5	0	0	2.0	8	6	6	3	3
	David Moraga	0	0	37.80	3	0	0	1.2	6	7	7	2	2
	Team totals	67	95	5.13	162	162	39	1424.2	1575	902	812	579	1011

== Award winners ==
2000 Major League Baseball All-Star Game

- Jose Vidro, Second Base, Reserve
- Vladimir Guerrero, Outfield, Reserve

== Farm system ==
Level	Team	League	Manager
AAA	Ottawa Lynx	International League	Jeff Cox and Rick Sweet
AA	Harrisburg Senators	Eastern League	Doug Sisson
A	Jupiter Hammerheads	Florida State League	Luis Dorante
A	Cape Fear Crocs	South Atlantic League	Bill Masse
A-Short Season	Vermont Expos	New York–Penn League	Tim Leiper
Rookie	GCL Expos	Gulf Coast League	Steve Phillips
