= List of Sacramento City College alumni =

Sacramento City College is a public community college in Sacramento, California. Following is a list of some of its notable alumni.

== Art and architecture ==
- F. Carlton Ball – potter, educator
- Faith Bromberg – painter
- Ray Eames – artist, designer, and architect
- Kurt Edward Fishback – photographer
- Mel Ramos – artist
- Wes Wilson – rock poster artist

== Business ==
- Sherwood "Shakey" Johnson – founder of Shakey's Pizza Parlor chain

== Entertainment ==
- Samuel Charters – writer on music and record producer
- Jessica Chastain – Academy Award-winning actress
- Sasha Grey – actress and adult film star
- Doug Siebum – professional audio engineer
- Bergen Williams – filmmaker, inventor, artist

== Law ==
- Jeff Adachi – elected public defender of San Francisco, pension reform advocate, and former candidate for mayor of San Francisco
- Tani Cantil-Sakauye – 28th chief justice of California
- Morrison C. England Jr. – chief United States district judge for the Eastern District of California

== Literature and journalism ==
- Herb Caen – Pulitzer Prize-winning columnist for the San Francisco Chronicle
- Nguyen Do – poet, editor and translator

== Politics ==
- John E. Moss – served in 13 Congresses of the United States House of Representatives and championed the Freedom of Information Act

== Science and engineering ==
- Michael James Adams – aviator and NASA astronaut

== Sports ==
=== Boxing and MMA ===
- Lou Nova – heavyweight boxer who was the 1935 amateur world champion, and fought Joe Louis in 1941
- Scott Smith – professional mixed martial arts fighter in the UFC

=== Baseball ===
- Facundo Cuno Barragan – former MLB catcher
- Dave Berg – seven-year MLB infielder
- Adam Bernero – former MLB pitcher
- Joe Bitker – former MLB pitcher
- Jeff Blauser – 13-year MLB shortstop with the Atlanta Braves and Chicago Cubs
- Chris Bosio – 10-year MLB pitcher with the Milwaukee Brewers and Seattle Mariners
- Larry Bowa – former MLB shortstop and current Los Angeles Dodgers third-base coach
- Jim Bowie – former MLB first baseman and current hitting coach for the Fresno Grizzlies
- Kevin Brown – former MLB pitcher
- Rob Cooper – college baseball coach at Wright State and Penn State
- Trace Coquillette – former MLB infielder
- Ken Dowell – former MLB shortstop
- Bob Forsch – former MLB pitcher
- Ken Forsch – former MLB pitcher
- La Vel Freeman – former MLB designated hitter
- Joe Horgan – former MLB pitcher
- Ken Hottman – former MLB outfielder
- John Spider Jorgensen – former MLB infielder
- Mike Marjama- catcher for the Seattle Mariners
- Jeffrey Marquez- pitcher for the Chicago White Sox
- Buck Martinez – 17-year MLB catcher
- Darrell May – former MLB pitcher
- Jason McDonald – former MLB outfielder
- John McNamara – former MLB manager
- Marcus Moore – former MLB pitcher
- David Moraga – former MLB pitcher
- Mike Neu former MLB pitcher and current Cal Berkeley head coach
- Jerry Nielsen – former MLB pitcher
- Geno Petralli – 12-year MLB catcher
- R. J. Reynolds – eight-year MLB outfielder
- Matt Riley – former MLB pitcher
- Rich Rodas – former MLB pitcher
- F. P. Santangelo – seven-year MLB player and an analyst on the San Francisco Giants pregame show on Fox Sports Net
- Rick Schu – former MLB infielder
- Joe Thurston – infielder in the St. Louis Cardinals organization
- Greg Vaughn – four-time MLB All-Star outfielder
- Randy Veres – former MLB pitcher
- Fernando Viña – 12-year infielder for five MLB teams
- Casey Weathers – member of the bronze medal winning 2008 Summer Olympics United States baseball team
- Larry Wolfe – former MLB infielder
- Charlie Zink – pitcher for the Boston Red Sox

=== Basketball ===
- Bill Putnam – college basketball player and coach
- John Stanich – guard on the 1950 U.S. national basketball team which placed second at the 1950 FIBA World Championship, where he was the only American on the all-tournament team

=== Football ===
- Robert Awalt – seven-year NFL tight end
- Issac Booth – three-year NFL defensive back
- James Campen – seven-year NFL offensive lineman for the Green Bay Packers, where he is currently an assistant coach
- Gene Cronin – seven-year NFL defensive lineman
- Rick Cunningham – eight-year NFL lineman
- Bobby Dawson – former Canadian Football League defensive back
- Kenny Graham – seven-year AFL/NFL defensive back
- Akiem Hicks – current defensive lineman for the Chicago Bears of the NFL
- Mike Jones – three-year NFL tight end
- Stephen Jordan – former Canadian Football League defensive back who was the 1989 rookie of the year
- Derrick Lewis – former NFL and Arena Football League wide receiver
- Carl Littlefield – former NFL running back
- Stan Mataele – former NFL defensive lineman
- Perry Schwartz – all-American end for UC Berkeley's undefeated "Thunder Team" in 1937 and a first team all-NFL end for Brooklyn Dodgers in 1940 and 1941 when he led the league in yards per catch
- Phil Snow – football coach who is currently the defensive coordinator for Baylor University
- Alex Van Dyke – five-year NFL wide receiver, who also set NCAA receiving records while at the University of Nevada, Reno
- Seneca Wallace – former quarterback for the Cleveland Browns of the NFL
- Derek Ware – former NFL tight end and running back
- Ahkello Witherspoon – current NFL cornerback
- Keith Wright – former NFL defensive tackle

=== Olympians ===
- Malachi Davis – ran in the 400-meter and 4x400-meter at the 2004 Summer Olympics for the United Kingdom team
- Sheila Hudson – 1996 Olympian and former world record holder in the triple jump
- Tommy Kono – three-time medalist in weightlifting in the 1952 Summer Olympics, 1956 Summer Olympics and 1960 Summer Olympics
- Albert Miller – 3-time Olympian (1984, 1988, and 1992) in the decathlon for Fiji
- Jamie Nieto – finished 4th in the high jump in the 2004 Summer Olympics
- Roger "Jack" Parker – bronze medalist in the decathlon at the 1936 Berlin Olympics
- Edwin Salisbury – was the stroke for the 1932 gold medal-winning men's rowing eights team that was later inducted into the National Rowing Foundation's Rowing Hall of Fame
- Richson Simeon – track and field athlete, competed at the 2016 Summer Olympics in the men's 100 meters event for the Marshall Islands
- John "Jack" Stack – won a gold medal in the men's rowing eights at the 1948 Olympic Games
- George Stanich – bronze medalist in the high jump in the 1948 Summer Olympics, as well as John Wooden's first all-American basketball player at UCLA

=== Track and field ===
- Tom Moore – world record holder in the 120 yard high hurdles in 1935, US national champion in the 400m hurdles in 1935, and member of the National Track & Field Hall of Fame
