= Alex Pacheco (baseball) =

Venezuelan baseball player (born 1973)

- Pitcher
- Born: July 19, 1973 (age 52); Caracas, Venezuela
- Batted: Right Threw: Right

MLB debut
- April 17, 1996, for the Montreal Expos

Last MLB appearance
- May 15, 1996, for the Montreal Expos

MLB statistics
- Games pitched: 5
- Earned run average: 11.12
- Strikeouts: 7
- Stats at Baseball Reference

Teams
- Montreal Expos (1996)

Alexander Melchor Pacheco Lara (born July 19, 1973) is a Venezuelan former pitcher in Major League Baseball who played for the Montreal Expos in its 1996 season. Listed at 6' 3" [1.93 m], 200 lb. [91 k], Pacheco batted and threw right handed. He was born in Caracas, Venezuela.

== Career ==
The Expos signed Pacheco as an amateur free agent in 1989. Pacheco made his debut with the Gulf Coast League Expos in 1990, spending six seasons in the Montreal Minor League system, where he was mostly used as a long reliever and spot starter, until he joined the big team in April 1996. In five relief appearances for the Expos, Pacheco posted an 11.12 ERA and did not have a decision or save, giving up seven earned runs on eight hits and one walk while striking out seven in 5 2/3 innings of work.

Pacheco spent the remainder of the 1996 season with the Harrisburg Senators. Late in the year, he was sent along with Jeff Fassero to the Seattle Mariners for Trey Moore, Matt Wagner and Chris Widger. Pacheco spent 1997 in the Mariners' organization, and later pitched for the Tampa Bay Devil Rays and New York Yankees Triple A teams in a span of three seasons from 1998 to 2002.

In between, Pacheco played winter ball for four clubs of the Venezuelan League during 13 seasons between 1989 and 2002, as well as for the Pericos de Puebla of the Mexican League in 2000 and 2002–2003.

Overall, Pacheco had a 50–54 record with a 4.34 ERA and 55 saves at six different levels, along with 649 strikeouts and 348 walks in 713 1/3 innings.

After his playing retirement, Pacheco became a coach in the Venezuelan League.

== See also ==
- List of players from Venezuela in Major League Baseball
- Montreal Expos all-time roster
