= Skrmetta =

Skrmetta is a surname. Notable people with the surname include:

- Eric Skrmetta (born 1958), American public official
- Matt Skrmetta (born 1972), American baseball player
