= Jerry Robertson =

Jerry or Jerome Robertson may refer to:

- Jerry Robertson (baseball) (1943–1996), Major League Baseball pitcher
- Jerry Robertson (racing driver) (born 1962), NASCAR driver
- Jerome B. Robertson (1815–1890), doctor, Indian fighter, Texas politician and general

== See also ==
- Robertson (surname)
