= Jeff Fassero =

American baseball player and coach (born 1963)

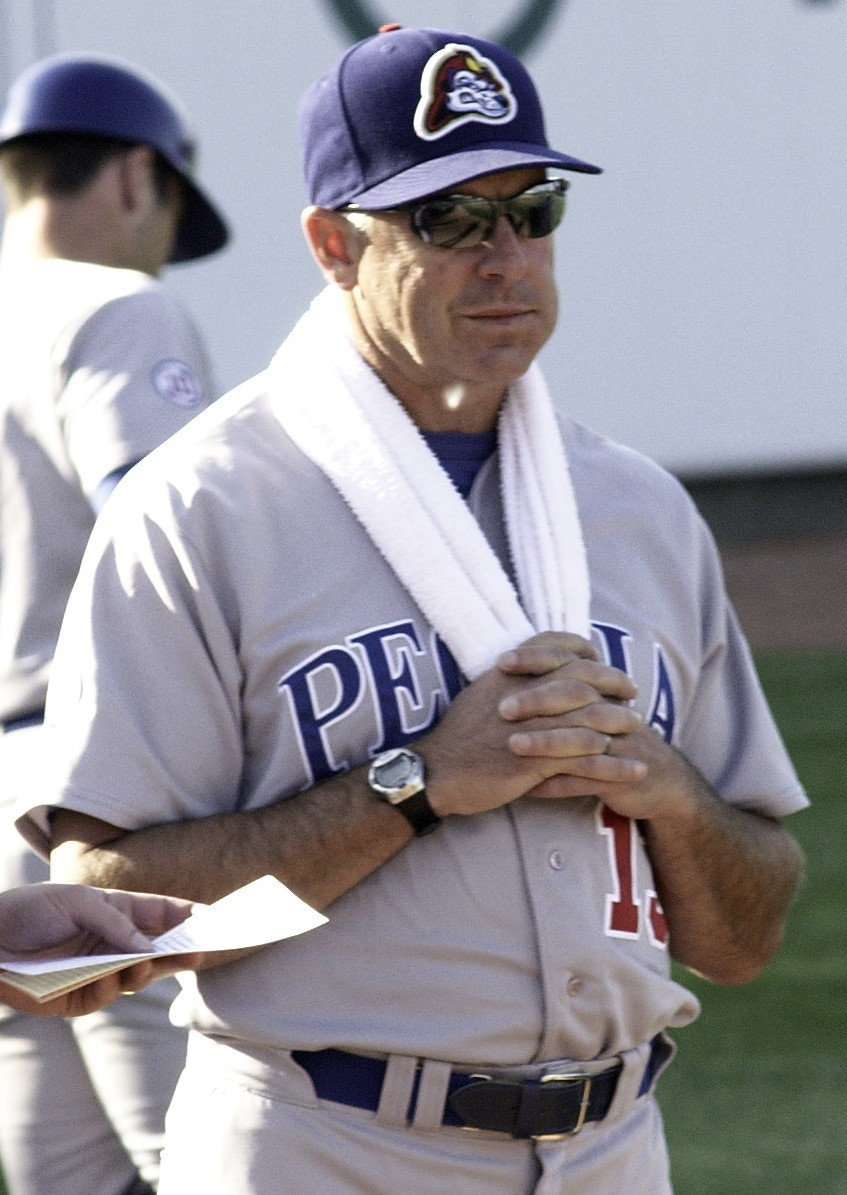
- Fassero with the Peoria Chiefs in 2011
- Pitcher
- Born: January 5, 1963 (age 63); Springfield, Illinois, U.S.
- Batted: Left Threw: Left

MLB debut
- May 4, 1991, for the Montreal Expos

Last MLB appearance
- May 7, 2006, for the San Francisco Giants

MLB statistics
- Win–loss record: 121–124
- Earned run average: 4.11
- Strikeouts: 1,643
- Stats at Baseball Reference

Teams
- Montreal Expos (1991–1996); Seattle Mariners (1997–1999); Texas Rangers (1999); Boston Red Sox (2000); Chicago Cubs (2001–2002); St. Louis Cardinals (2002–2003); Colorado Rockies (2004); Arizona Diamondbacks (2004); San Francisco Giants (2005–2006)

Jeffrey Joseph Fassero (born January 5, 1963) is an American former Major League Baseball (MLB) pitcher and minor league coach. He played for nine MLB teams and was an Opening Day starter several times for both the Montreal Expos and Seattle Mariners.

== Playing career ==
Fassero played college baseball Lincoln Land Community College in his hometown of Springfield, Illinois, then for the Ole Miss Rebels. The St. Louis Cardinals drafted Fassero in the 22nd round of the 1984 MLB draft.

=== Montreal Expos ===
Fassero signed as a free agent with the Montreal Expos in January 1991 and made his MLB debut that May. At 28, Fassero was somewhat old for a rookie, but pitched well for the team and eventually made it to the starting rotation by the 1993 season. That same year he posted an impressive 2.29 earned run average (ERA). He became a full-time starter during the 1994 season. On June 13, he was one out away from a no-hitter when a ball bounced out of his glove for a hit. He allowed a two-run home run to the next batter, Jay Bell of the Pittsburgh Pirates. His final season in Montreal was his best, as he won 15 games with 222 strikeouts in 1996. He was the National League (NL) Pitcher of the Month in June and July and finished ninth in NL Cy Young Award voting.

=== Seattle Mariners ===
On October 29, 1996, in a cost-cutting move, the Expos traded Fassero and Alex Pacheco to the Seattle Mariners in exchange for Chris Widger, Matt Wagner, and Trey Moore. Fassero had one of his best seasons for the Mariners in 1997. That season he posted a 16–9 win-loss record with a 3.61 ERA. He tied for the major league lead with 35 starts.

=== Later MLB career ===
Fassero enjoyed some stability during his time with the Mariners, but after a mid-season waiver claim by the Texas Rangers in 1999, he would wind up playing on eight different teams from 1999 to 2005. He proved to no longer be effective as a regular starter, so he was moved into the bullpen. Fassero made six starts for the St. Louis Cardinals in 2003 but only won one game.

While with the Colorado Rockies in September 2004, Fassero got into a dispute with Colorado management when he was called on to make a spot start on short notice. Fassero said that he would not be ready in time and was subsequently released by the Rockies due to what manager Clint Hurdle called "philosophical differences". The same day he was released, Fassero with the Arizona Diamondbacks. He pitched once for Arizona, throwing one perfect inning in relief.

=== San Francisco Giants ===
Fassero signed with the Giants on December 15, 2004 and remained on the team until May 8, 2006, when the Giants designated him for assignment. The move cleared room on the team's roster for starter Noah Lowry.

On February 9, 2007, Fassero announced his retirement. In the winter of 2008, though, Fassero pitched with Mayos de Navojoa in the Mexican Pacific League before he retired for good.

== Coaching career ==
Fassero was hired in December 2009 as the pitching coach for the Boise Hawks, a minor league affiliate of the Chicago Cubs in the Class A Short Season Northwest League. For the 2011 season, Fassero was promoted to pitching coach of the Peoria Chiefs in the Midwest League. Fassero received a promotion to the Double-A Tennessee Smokies for the 2012 season.

From 2014 to 2015, Fassero was the pitching coach for the Double-A Pensacola Blue Wahoos in the Cincinnati Reds minor league system. He started the 2016 season as a roving pitching instructor for the Cincinnati Reds before being named pitching coach of the Triple-A Louisville Bats, taking over for the recently promoted Ted Power. Fassero coached the Bats through 2019.

== See also ==
- List of Montreal Expos Opening Day starting pitchers
- List of Seattle Mariners Opening Day starting pitchers
