= Matt Wagner (baseball) =

American baseball player (born 1972)

- Pitcher
- Born: April 4, 1972 (age 54); Cedar Falls, Iowa, U.S.
- Batted: Right Threw: Right

MLB debut
- June 5, 1996, for the Seattle Mariners

Last MLB appearance
- September 22, 1996, for the Seattle Mariners

MLB statistics
- Win–loss record: 3–5
- Earned run average: 6.86
- Strikeouts: 41
- Stats at Baseball Reference

Teams
- Seattle Mariners (1996)

Matthew William Wagner (born April 4, 1972), is an American former Major League Baseball (MLB) pitcher who played in 1996 with the Seattle Mariners. He threw and batted right-handed. Wagner had a 3–5 record and 6.86 earned run average in 15 games in the majors.

Wagner played college baseball for the Arkansas Razorbacks, leaving the program after suffering an arm injury. He then played for the Iowa State Cyclones. The Mariners selected him in the third round of the 1994 MLB draft. He worked as a relief pitcher in his first professional season before becoming a full-time starter in 1995. He reached the majors in June 1996, starting 14 games for the Mariners. He threw a complete game for his third and final MLB win in July.

After his only MLB season, Seattle traded Wagner, Chris Widger, and Trey Moore to the Montreal Expos for starter Jeff Fassero. Wagner had more injuries, undergoing surgery in May 1997 and May 1998, pitching only two games in the minors. Wagner pitched in independent baseball leagues from 2000 to 2003, going 0–7 for the Road Warriors of the Atlantic League in 2002 before rebounding to an 11–6 record with two teams in his final professional season.

Wagner threw four pitches: a fastball, slider, splitter, and changeup.

== Personal life ==
Wagner married his wife in 1995. Their daughter was born on 1997.

Wagner was an All-State baseball and football player at Cedar Falls High School in Cedar Falls, Iowa.
