= Urbano Lugo =

Venezuelan baseball player (born 1962)

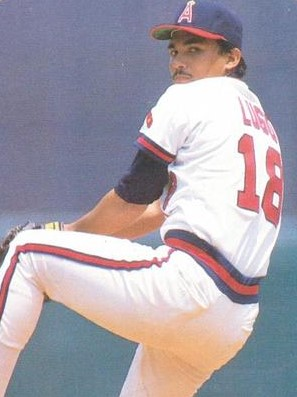
- Pitcher
- Born: August 12, 1962 (age 63); Punto Fijo, Falcón, Venezuela
- Batted: Right Threw: Right

MLB debut
- April 28, 1985, for the California Angels

Last MLB appearance
- May 11, 1990, for the Detroit Tigers

MLB statistics
- Win–loss record: 6–7
- Earned run average: 5.31
- Strikeouts: 91

CPBL statistics
- Win–loss record: 29–33
- Earned run average: 3.23
- Strikeouts: 317
- Stats at Baseball Reference

Teams
- California Angels (1985–1988); Montreal Expos (1989); Detroit Tigers (1990); Mercuries Tigers (1991, 1995–1998)

Member of the Venezuelan

Baseball Hall of Fame
- Induction: 2009

Rafael Urbano Lugo Colina (born August 12, 1962) is a Venezuelan former professional baseball player. He played in Major League Baseball as a pitcher from 1985 through 1990. Listed at 6 ft 0 in (1.83 m), 185 pounds (84 kg), he batted and threw right handed.

== Career ==
Born in Punto Fijo, Falcón, Lugo was originally signed by the California Angels organization as a free agent in 1982. He entered the majors in 1985 with the Angels, pitching for them four years before joining the Montreal Expos (1989) and the Detroit Tigers (1990).

Lugo posted a 3–4 record and a 3.69 earned run average in 20 pitching appearances In his rookie season, including 10 starts and one complete game, striking out 42 and walking 29, while allowing 86 hits in 83.0 innings of work.

He pitched sparingly after that, bouncing up and down between the majors and minors for the rest of his career, including a four-year stint in the Mexican League with the Charros de Jalisco (1991–1994), while managing the team in the 1994 season.

His father, of the same name, was a successful Minor League pitcher, having both pitched for the Leones del Caracas of the Venezuelan Professional Baseball League.

Both father and son as well as catcher Bo Díaz were part of an extremely unlikely event spanning thirteen years. On January 6, 1973, Díaz was behind the plate for the elder Lugo's no-hitter, as the Caracas club defeated the Tiburones de La Guaira, 6–0. Thirteen years later, on January 24, 1986, Díaz caught Lugo Jr. as he threw his own no-hitter, in a 4–0 Caracas victory over La Guaira.

In 2009, Lugo gained induction into the Venezuelan Baseball Hall of Fame and Museum as part of their sixth class.

== See also ==
- Players from Venezuela in Major League Baseball
- Montreal Expos all-time roster
