= Steven Klein =

Steven Klein or Kline may refer to:

== Sports ==
- Steve Kline (left-handed pitcher) (born 1972), MLB pitcher
- Steve Kline (right-handed pitcher) (1947–2018), MLB pitcher
- Steve Klein (soccer) (born 1975), American soccer player

== Others ==
- Steve Klein (musician) (born 1979), American musician
- Steven Klein (artist) (born 1965), American photographer
- Steve Klein, producer of Innocence of Muslims
- Steven Klein (producer), Film producer
