= Sean Spencer (baseball) =

American baseball player (born 1975)

- Relief pitcher
- Born: May 29, 1975 (age 50); Seattle, Washington, U.S.
- Batted: Left Threw: Left

MLB debut
- May 6, 1999, for the Seattle Mariners

Last MLB appearance
- September 28, 2000, for the Montreal Expos

MLB statistics
- Win–loss record: 0–0
- Earned run average: 8.64
- Strikeouts: 8
- Stats at Baseball Reference

Teams
- Seattle Mariners (1999); Montreal Expos (2000)

Sean James Spencer (born May 29, 1975) is an American former professional relief pitcher. He played in Major League Baseball (MLB) for the Seattle Mariners in 1999 and Montreal Expos in 2000. He later played for Greece in the 2004 Summer Olympics.

Spencer graduated from South Kitsap High School in Port Orchard, Washington in 1993. He won several statewide high school baseball honors. He played for the United States national under-18 team that finished second in the 1993 World Junior Baseball Championship. He then attended the University of Washington, where he played college baseball for the Huskies from 1994–1995. In 1994, he pitched for the U.S. collegiate national team, with a 10.30 earned run average (ERA) in five games. In 1995, he played collegiate summer baseball with the Brewster Whitecaps of the Cape Cod Baseball League. He had Tommy John surgery in 1996.

Spencer's hometown Mariners selected him in the 40th round of the 1996 MLB draft. He was a Southern League All-Star in 1998. He made his major league debut with the Mariners on May 6, 1999, pitching 1/3 of an inning and giving up 2 earned runs against the Cleveland Indians. He pitched his final game for the Mariners the next day before being demoted to the minors.

On August 10, 2000, Spencer was announced as the first of two players to be named later traded to the Expos for Chris Widger. In eight games for Montreal that season, he had a 5.40 ERA and six strikeouts. He dealt with shoulder tendonitis in the minors in 2001. The Expos released him on July 19, 2002. On July 25, 2003, Spencer signed a minor league contract with the Baltimore Orioles and pitched in the minors for them until his retirement after the 2004 season.

Spencer played for Greece in the 2004 Summer Olympics in Athens, Greece. He was 0–1 with a 3.38 ERA, pitching in four of his team's seven games. He also pitched for the Greek team that finished second in the 2003 European Baseball Championship, going 1–0 with a 0.00 ERA in three games, including one start.

== Personal life ==
Spencer's father played college baseball for the Idaho Vandals and for the U.S. national team at the 1967 Pan American Games. Spencer's grandfather also played baseball for the Washington Huskies.
