= Talmadge Nunnari =

American baseball player (born 1975)

- First baseman
- Born: April 9, 1975 (age 50); Pensacola, Florida, U.S.
- Batted: Left Threw: Left

MLB debut
- September 27, 2000, for the Montreal Expos

Last MLB appearance
- October 1, 2000, for the Montreal Expos

Career statistics
- Plate appearances: 12
- Walks: 6
- Hits: 1
- Stats at Baseball Reference

Teams
- Montreal Expos (2000)

Talmadge Raphael Nunnari (born April 9, 1975) is an American former Major League Baseball player. Nunnari played first base and outfield for the Montreal Expos in 2000 and was the assistant coach for the Jacksonville University Dolphins baseball team. Nunnari played his college ball at Jacksonville University.

In the 2009 and 2010 seasons, Nunnari was manager of the independent club the Pensacola Pelicans after having worked in the team's front office first as a corporate sales executive and hitting coach and then general manager since 2003. Nunnari worked with the organization's transition from the independent American Association to the affiliated AA Southern League but left to accept the position at JU.
