= Lenny Webster =

American baseball player (born 1965)

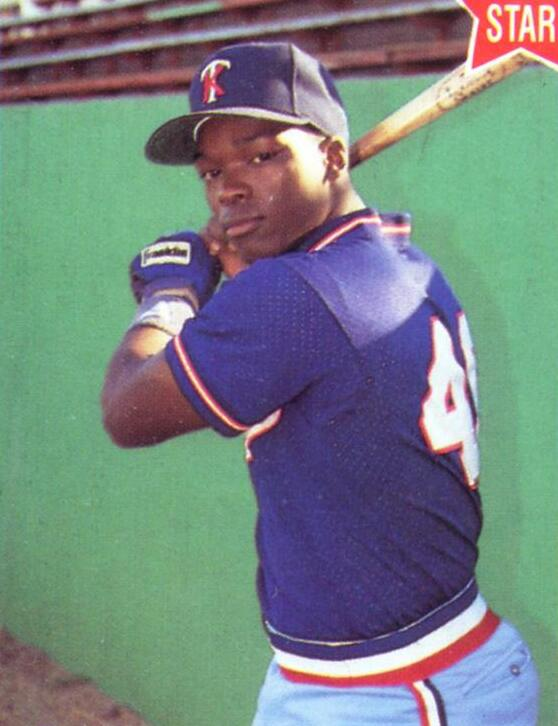
- Webster with the Kenosha Twins c. 1988
- Catcher
- Born: February 10, 1965 (age 61); New Orleans, Louisiana, U.S.
- Batted: Right Threw: Right

MLB debut
- September 1, 1989, for the Minnesota Twins

Last MLB appearance
- September 23, 2000, for the Montreal Expos

MLB statistics
- Batting average: .254
- Home runs: 33
- Runs batted in: 176
- Stats at Baseball Reference

Teams
- Minnesota Twins (1989–1993); Montreal Expos (1994); Philadelphia Phillies (1995); Montreal Expos (1996); Baltimore Orioles (1997–1999); Boston Red Sox (1999); Montreal Expos (2000)

Leonard Irell Webster (born February 10, 1965) is an American former professional baseball player. He played in Major League Baseball as a catcher from 1989 to 2000. Webster was one of the active players wearing number 42 while playing for the Baltimore Orioles when Major League Baseball retired the number to honor Jackie Robinson in 1997. He made his debut on September 1, 1989 as a defensive replacement at catcher with the Minnesota Twins. His final game was on September 23, 2000 as a pinch hitter for Jeremy Powell with the Montreal Expos.

In 587 games over 12 seasons, Webster posted a .254 batting average (368-for-1450) with 157 runs, 73 doubles, 2 triples, 33 home runs, 176 RBI, 140 bases on balls, .324 on-base percentage and .375 slugging percentage. He finished his career with a .995 fielding percentage as a catcher. In the 1997 postseason covering 7 games, he hit .200 (3-for-15) with 1 run and 1 RBI.

Webster is Married to Rasheda Davis- Webster and the Couple Share 9 Children and 8 Grandchildren.
