= Jerry Robertson (baseball) =

American baseball player (1943–1996)

- Pitcher
- Born: October 13, 1943; Winchester, Kansas, U.S.
- Died: March 24, 1996 (aged 52); Burlington, Kansas, U.S.
- Batted: Switch Threw: Right

MLB debut
- April 8, 1969, for the Montreal Expos

Last MLB appearance
- June 28, 1970, for the Detroit Tigers

MLB statistics
- Win–loss record: 5–16
- Earned run average: 3.94
- Strikeouts: 144
- Stats at Baseball Reference

Teams
- Montreal Expos (1969); Detroit Tigers (1970)

Jerry Lee Robertson (October 13, 1943 – March 24, 1996) was an American professional baseball pitcher.

== Career ==
Born in Winchester, Kansas, the right-hander was drafted by the St. Louis Cardinals in the 27th round of the 1965 amateur draft, and later drafted by the Montreal Expos from the Cardinals as the 38th pick in the 1968 expansion draft. He played for the Expos (1969) and Detroit Tigers (1970).

Robertson started 27 of the 49 games he appeared in during his short MLB career. He pitched in the very first game in Montreal Expos history, contributing 1.1 innings of scoreless relief to an 11–10 victory over the New York Mets on April 8, 1969. He also had the best earned run average (ERA) (3.96) of any of the Expos pitchers who started 15 or more games during that inaugural season.

After being used in relief during the early part of the season, Robertson joined the starting rotation on May 23. He pitched six or more innings in 17 of his 27 starts, but did not get much run support from his teammates. In his 16 losses, the Expos scored a total of just 20 runs, and were victims of a shutout in seven of those games. On September 13, 1969, Robertson picked up his one and only save at the MLB level. He pitched 1 1/3 hitless innings to nail down a 7-5 Expos victory over the Phillies.

Robertson was traded by the Expos to the Detroit Tigers on December 3, 1969, for veteran right-handed pitcher Joe Sparma. In 1970, he appeared in 11 games for the Tigers, all in relief, with an ERA of 3.68. He also spent time with the Triple-A Toledo Mud Hens that year. On March 30, 1971, the Tigers traded him to the New York Mets, and he never again made it back to the big leagues.

Robertson died in an automobile accident in 1996 in Burlington, Kansas.

== See also ==
- Montreal Expos all-time roster
