= Steve Kline (left-handed pitcher) =

American baseball player (born 1972)

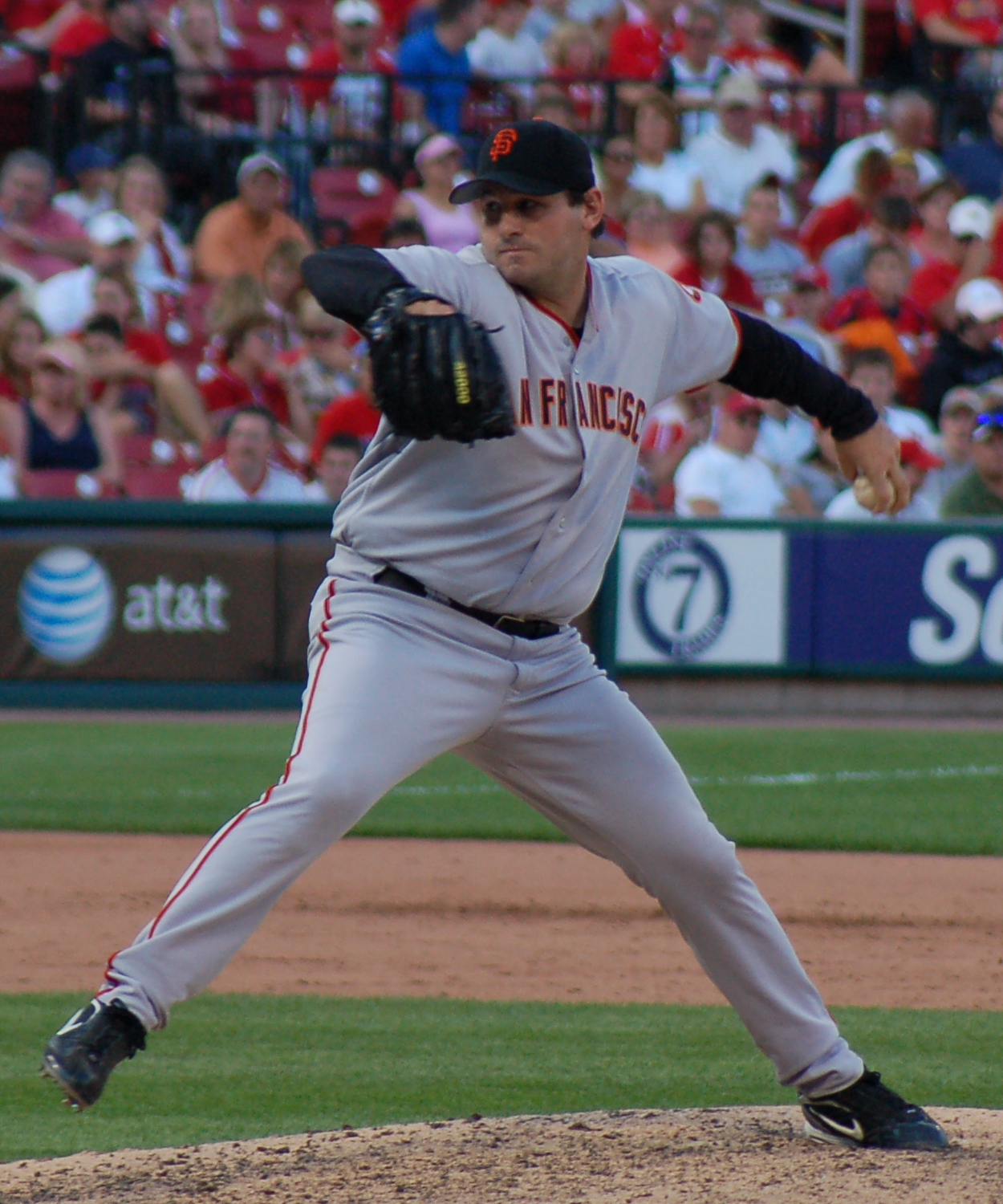
- Kline with the San Francisco Giants in 2006

IUP Crimson Hawks
- Pitcher / Coach
- Born: August 22, 1972 (age 52); Sunbury, Pennsylvania, U.S.
- Batted: Switch Threw: Left

MLB debut
- April 2, 1997, for the Cleveland Indians

Last MLB appearance
- September 25, 2007, for the San Francisco Giants

MLB statistics
- Win–loss record: 34–39
- Earned run average: 3.51
- Strikeouts: 493
- Stats at Baseball Reference

Teams
- Cleveland Indians (1997); Montreal Expos (1997–2000); St. Louis Cardinals (2001–2004); Baltimore Orioles (2005); San Francisco Giants (2006–2007)

Steven James Kline (born August 22, 1972) is an American college baseball coach for the IUP Crimson Hawks. He is also a former professional relief pitcher who pitched for the Cleveland Indians, Montreal Expos, St. Louis Cardinals, Baltimore Orioles, and San Francisco Giants of Major League Baseball (MLB) over an 11-year career. Kline attended West Virginia University, where he played college baseball for the Mountaineers.

== Career ==
=== Cleveland Indians ===
Kline was selected by the Cleveland Indians in the 8th round of the 1993 draft as a starting pitcher.

In 1994, he led the South Atlantic League with 18 wins (a team record), 174 strikeouts, and 185.2 innings pitched while playing for Single-A Columbus (Georgia), earning him the Bob Feller Award as Cleveland's best minor league pitcher.

Following a difficult season in 1996, where Kline went 8–12 with a 5.46 ERA at the Double A level, the Indians began using Kline primarily as a reliever for 1997.

Kline made his major league debut with the Indians in their 1997 season opener. He entered in the 6th inning with 1 out and a runner on base, against the Oakland Athletics with the score tied 6-6. He induced a flyout from Scott Spiezio for his first major league out, and the baserunner (Ernie Young) was caught stealing on the next pitch. He earned his first major league win as the Indians rallied to take the lead in the next half inning with Kline as the pitcher of record. He would go on to strike out his first major league batter (future teammate Jim Edmonds) in his next appearance. Kline ultimately struggled early in the season, and was sent back down to Triple A, where he continued to be used primarily as a reliever.

At the 1997 MLB Trading Deadline, Kline was traded to the Montreal Expos for pitcher Jeff Juden.

=== Montreal Expos ===
Kline appeared in 26 games with the Expos in 1997, though he struggled to a 6.15 ERA. Combined, his 1997 ERA between both Montreal and Cleveland was 5.98.

However, Kline began to take big strides forward as a left-handed reliever during the 1998 season. He held left-handed batters to a .178 average, and proved that his arsenal of pitches could be successful against both righty and lefty batters as even righties hit only .253 off him. He earned his first major league save on August 9 against the Arizona Diamondbacks, entering the game to start the 8th inning in a save situation (ahead 5–2), and finishing off what became an 8–2 victory. He finished 1998 with a 2.76 ERA in 78 appearances. His 78 appearances tied for second in the National League with Robb Nen and Chuck McElroy, and sixth in baseball.

In 1999 and 2000, he continued his strong pitching. He posted a career high total for wins in a single season in 1999 (7), and achieved a rare feat by striking out 4 batters in an inning against the San Francisco Giants on August 17. In 2000, Kline was actually used as the closer in June and part of July, amassing a career best 14 saves. He would actually lead or tie for the lead in Major League baseball for relief appearances in both seasons, demonstrating his durability, and the fact that he was a key reliever who had earned the trust of his manager.

In December 2000, Kline was part of what at the time was a blockbuster offseason trade between the Expos and St. Louis Cardinals as he headed to the Cardinals with pitcher Dustin Hermanson for young pitcher Britt Reames and the injury prone young slugger Fernando Tatis.

=== St. Louis Cardinals ===
During his time in St. Louis, Kline quickly became a fan favorite, known for the dirty hat he always wore when pitching. It was even inspiration for a Cardinals promotion at the ballpark in 2002, which the team called "Steve Kline Hat Day," and an ESPN feature on the subject. Kline was also active in the community with charity work, and quickly became known as an "everyman" who enjoyed spending time with fans and signing autographs. Kline easily ended up being the catch of that trade as he had his best season to date in 2001, finishing 3–3 with a 1.80 ERA and again leading all of MLB in relief appearances with 89, setting a new MLB record for a left-hander in a single season. It was the third consecutive season Kline had tied or led MLB in appearances. He held left-handed batters to a .149 batting average. Additionally, not only did Kline not allow a left-handed batter to hit a home run off him all season, he did not allow a single extra-base hit to a lefty either. After his strong campaign, Kline even received an MVP vote, the only time in his career he did so.

He remained one of the top left-handed relievers in baseball through the 2004 season, though, rather infamously in 2001 and 2002, he threw the pitches that ended both Cardinals' seasons during the MLB playoffs. In 2001, he gave up a walk off series winning single to Tony Womack of the Arizona Diamondbacks in the Division Series, and in 2002, Kenny Lofton got him for a similar hit in the NLCS to send the San Francisco Giants to the World Series against the Anaheim Angels. However, he was a key cog in both postseasons for the Cardinals. In fact, in 2001, Kline was called upon to close out both Cardinals victories in their 5-game Division Series loss to the Diamondbacks, and he responded with 2 saves in those clutch situations.

Kline's overall effectiveness against left-handed batters was again highlighted on August 12, 2002, despite the fact that in that game he gave up a home run to left-handed slugger Brian Giles. It was noted that the home run was the first Kline had allowed to a left-handed batter in over 2 years (the last had been to Troy O'Leary on July 17, 2000).

Kline appeared in his 500th Major League game on August 13, 2003, pitching 1.1 scoreless innings against the Pittsburgh Pirates.

Kline posted a career year in 2004, at 2–2 with a 1.79 ERA. He did not surrender an earned run pitching at home at Busch Stadium, and held left-handed batters to a .143 average. He was also part of the Cardinals' run to the World Series, where they fell to the Boston Red Sox. However, he was not able to pitch in the World Series after aggravating a finger tendon injury in the 2004 NLCS against the Houston Astros.

During the 2004-05 offseason, Kline signed as a free agent with the Baltimore Orioles.

=== Baltimore Orioles ===
During his first week of play with the Orioles, Kline lashed out at his teammates for not supporting him like his Cardinals teammates had when he said, "I'm so used to (Edgar) Rentería and Jimmy (Edmonds) running down my mistakes and picking me up." He also bashed his home fans when he declared, "There's nothing worse than getting booed at home. St. Louis fans are too good for that. They understand the game more than most people."

Following the 2005 season, in which he posted a 4.28 ERA, Baltimore traded Kline to the San Francisco Giants for set-up reliever LaTroy Hawkins.

=== San Francisco Giants ===
Following the struggles of his 2005 campaign, Kline had a successful debut season in 2006 with the Giants, posting a 4–3 record to go along with a 3.66 ERA. He appeared in his 700th game on July 26, 2006, pitching a scoreless inning against the Washington Nationals, who of course had been the Expos when Kline had pitched for them earlier in his career in Montreal. All told, he would appear in 72 games in 2006.

On December 8, 2006, the Giants re-signed Kline to a two-year deal.

Kline was used as a left-handed specialist in the 2007 season, pitching in 68 games, and worked 46 innings with a 4.70 ERA and a 1–2 record. However, Kline struggled in 2007 compared to his earlier success, as lefties hit .318 off him.

On May 13, 2007, while the Giants were routing the Colorado Rockies 15–1, in the 8th inning, Kline gave up a single to Yorvit Torrealba. Torrealba stole second, meaningless to the Giants, and scored on a base hit for the Rockies' second run. Kline told the newspapers he was angry at Torrealba for stealing a base in a 15–1 game, saying "You know what? I'm a dumb hick, and I forget a lot of things, but I'm not gonna forget that." Torrealba responded by saying "What's he gonna do? Hit me with an 84 MPH fastball?" The next time Kline faced the Rockies, on May 26, 2007, Torrealba was hit on the first pitch by Kline with an 88 MPH fastball. As Torrealba walked to first, he said something angrily to Kline, and the benches cleared. The two had to be restrained by teammates and the umpires while they struggled to fight each other.

After a poor spring training before the 2008 season, Kline was designated for assignment on March 30 and was released on April 5. On April 10, 2008, Kline signed a minor league contract with the Philadelphia Phillies and was assigned to their Triple-A affiliate, the Lehigh Valley IronPigs. On June 9, 2008, Kline was ejected from a game for making contact with an umpire; facing a fine and possible suspension, the Phillies released Kline two days later, on June 11, 2008.

Kline finished his career tied for 11th all-time among left-handed pitchers with 796 appearances.

== Post-playing career ==
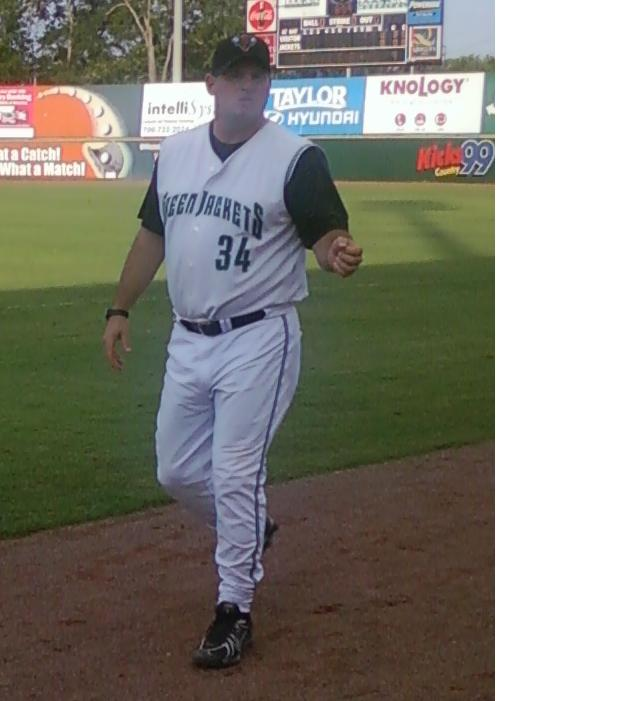
Steve Kline, as pitching coach of the Augusta Greenjackets

After his release from the Phillies in 2008, Kline retired and began coaching in the Giants instructional leagues.

On December 17, 2008, he was announced as the pitching coach for the Single-A Augusta GreenJackets.

On May 10, 2011, he was suspended after he head-butted an umpire. He was later suspended for 15 days and fined $500 for the incident.

On January 26, 2012, he was announced as the pitching coach for the Class A Advanced San Jose Giants.

Then, in the World Baseball Classic Qualifier, which took place in Taiwan from November 15 to 18, 2012, Kline was the pitching coach of team New Zealand. He returned as the Augusta GreenJackets' pitching coach for the 2013 and 2014 seasons.

He served as the pitching coach for the Richmond Flying Squirrels, the Double-A affiliate of the San Francisco Giants, from 2015 to 2017 and again from 2020 to 2021. He spent most of the 2018 and 2019 seasons as the pitching coach for the club's Triple-A affiliate, the Sacramento River Cats, with a brief stint as the San Francisco Giants' bullpen coach in 2019.

On June 4, 2021, he was named head coach of Indiana University of Pennsylvania's Division II baseball team.

== Pitching style ==
Known for his colorful sound bites, he has accused umpires of favoring the New York Yankees and has jokingly said he thought about putting one ump in the "Cobra Clutch". One of Kline's signature pitches is a sinker that seems to "roll off the kitchen table". He utilized this pitch frequently when serving as a setup man for the St. Louis Cardinals. He also had an above average slider that he often featured against left-handed batters throughout his career, and would throw the occasional changeup.

Though he did not bat often, Kline, a switch hitter, chose to bat right-handed against right-handed pitchers three times in his career.

== See also ==
- List of Major League Baseball single-inning strikeout leaders
- Steve Kline (right-handed pitcher)
- Steven Klein (disambiguation)
