= Andy Tracy =

American baseball player (born 1973)

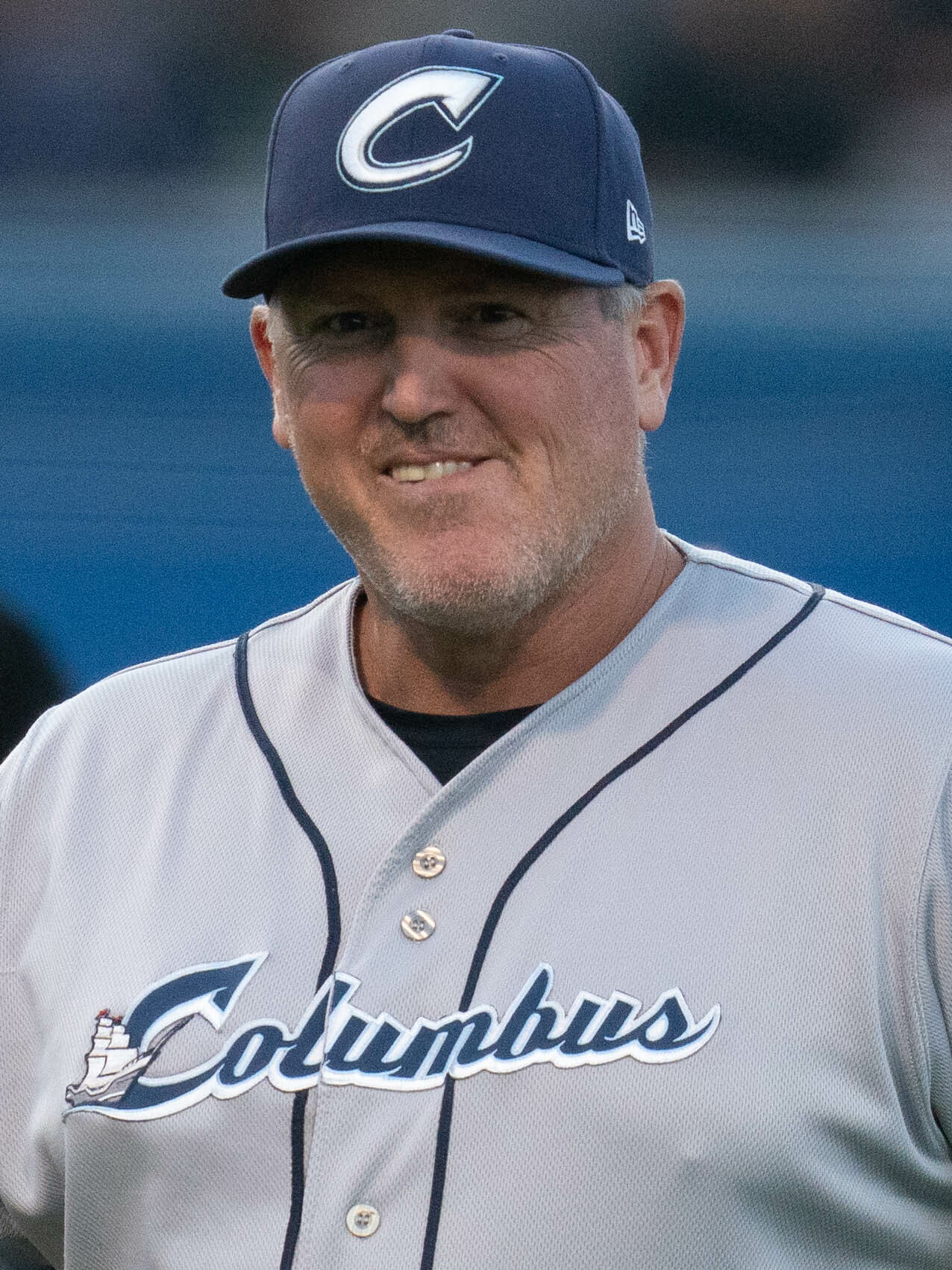
- Tracy as manager of the Columbus Clippers in 2023

Columbus Clippers
- Third baseman / First baseman
- Born: December 11, 1973 (age 52); Bowling Green, Ohio, U.S.
- Batted: Left Threw: Right

Professional debut
- MLB: April 25, 2000, for the Montreal Expos
- NPB: May 4, 2005, for the Tohoku Rakuten Golden Eagles

Last appearance
- NPB: August 27, 2005, for the Tohoku Rakuten Golden Eagles
- MLB: October 4, 2009, for the Philadelphia Phillies

MLB statistics
- Batting average: .231
- Home runs: 13
- Runs batted in: 43

NPB statistics
- Batting average: .209
- Home runs: 6
- Runs batted in: 15
- Stats at Baseball Reference

Teams
- Montreal Expos (2000–2001); Colorado Rockies (2004); Tohoku Rakuten Golden Eagles (2005); Philadelphia Phillies (2008–2009)

Andrew Michael Tracy (born December 11, 1973) is an American former Major League Baseball (MLB) first baseman who played for the Montreal Expos, Colorado Rockies, and Philadelphia Phillies between 2000 and 2009. He is the manager for the Columbus Clippers.

== Amateur career ==
A native of Bowling Green, Ohio, Tracy attended Bowling Green High School and Bowling Green State University. In 1994, he played collegiate summer baseball with the Orleans Cardinals of the Cape Cod Baseball League.

== Professional career ==
=== Montreal Expos ===
Drafted by the Montreal Expos in the 16th round of the 1996 Major League Baseball draft, Tracy made his Major League Baseball debut with the Expos on April 25, 2000.

Tracy compiled what would become a career high .260 batting average with 11 home runs and 32 RBI in 2000. Tracy split time backing up Expos starting first baseman Lee Stevens and starting third baseman Michael Barrett.

Tracy entered Spring Training of 2001 competing for the starting third base position. The position was vacated when Barrett moved to the catcher position. Tracy competed with Geoff Blum, Fernando Tatís, Mike Mordecai, and Ryan Minor for the position, which ultimately went to Blum. After compiling a mere .109 batting average with 2 home runs and 8 RBI throughout the season, Tracy was selected off waivers from the Expos by the New York Mets on March 27, 2002.

=== Colorado Rockies ===
Tracy would not appear at the MLB level again until the 2004 season.

He spent the 2002 and 2003 seasons in the minor league systems of the New York Mets and Colorado Rockies, respectively.

Tracy returned to the majors in 2004, appearing in 15 games for the Rockies, serving primarily as a pinch hitter. A .188 batting average with no home runs and one RBI was Tracy's offensive result by season's end.

Tracy began the 2005 season playing for the Colorado Springs Sky Sox, the Triple-AAA affiliate of the Rockies.

=== Tohoku Rakuten Golden Eagles ===
Midway through the season he left the Rockies organization and finished the campaign playing for the Tohoku Rakuten Golden Eagles of the Japanese Pacific League.

The 2006 and 2007 seasons saw Tracy return to playing in the minor league systems of MLB's Baltimore Orioles and New York Mets, with no appearances in the majors.

=== Philadelphia Phillies ===
Tracy was invited to attend Spring Training with the Philadelphia Phillies as a non-roster invitee prior to the 2008 season, but was assigned to minor league camp on March 9, 2008. Tracy was assigned to the Phillies' Triple-A affiliate, the Lehigh Valley IronPigs, in Allentown, Pennsylvania until his call up to Philadelphia on August 23, 2008. Before his call-up Tracy had not appeared at the MLB level since October 3, 2004. Tracy was designated for assignment on August 27 and was outrighted to the minors, but returned when the rosters expanded on September 1. He broke his hand, while playing for the Philadelphia Phillies, late in 2008 as a result of a line drive which ended his season. The Phillies announced on September 9, 2009, that they would be releasing veteran pitcher Rodrigo López to make room on the roster for Tracy. The Phillies would win the World Series in 2008 and the National League pennant in 2009. Though Tracy was not an active member of the postseason roster in either season, he did accompany the club throughout the playoffs.

On August 5, 2010, it was announced that Tracy would be pulled from the IronPigs line up and benched to allow Matt Rizzotti to become the everyday first baseman after he was very successful for the Reading Phillies. According to Matt Eddy of baseballamerica.com, Tracy became a free agent after the 2010 season ended.

Tracy signed a minor league contract with the Arizona Diamondbacks on December 25, 2010, and was invited to 2011 Spring Training.

== Coaching career ==
After the 2011 season, Tracy retired and was named manager of the Williamsport Crosscutters, the Phillies class A farm team. Tracy spent seven years as a hitting coach and manager in the Phillies minor league system before being announced as the hitting coach for the Columbus Clippers in 2019 and becoming their manager in 2021. As of the 2024 season, he is still managing the team.
