= David Moraga =

American baseball player (born 1975)

- Pitcher
- Born: July 8, 1975 (age 50); Torrance, California, U.S.
- Batted: Left Threw: Left

MLB debut
- June 11, 2000, for the Montreal Expos

Last MLB appearance
- September 28, 2000, for the Colorado Rockies

MLB statistics
- Earned run average: 40.50
- Innings pitched: 2 2/3
- Stats at Baseball Reference

Teams
- Montreal Expos (2000); Colorado Rockies (2000)

David Moraga (born July 8, 1975) is an American former professional baseball pitcher who played for one season in Major League Baseball. He pitched in three games for the Montreal Expos during the 2000 Montreal Expos season, then was claimed by the Colorado Rockies off waivers and pitched a game for them during the 2000 Colorado Rockies season.

The Expos added Moraga to the Major League roster for the first time on June 11, 2000 following an injury to T. J. Tucker. He made his Major League debut on June 11 against the Toronto Blue Jays in Toronto and faced two batters, throwing a wild pitch, recording no outs, allowing an inherited runner to score and allowing two earned runs of his own. The Expos designated Moraga for assignment on June 17, 2000, at which point he had a 37.80 earned run average (ERA) in three pitching appearances.

The following day, the Rockies claimed Moraga off waivers. On September 20, the Rockies recalled Moraga from Triple-A Colorado Springs where he had credited minor league pitching coach Jim Wright with teaching him to throw a slider properly. He appeared in one game for the Rockies and allowed five earned runs in one inning pitched. Following the season, he was returned to the minors. His career 40.50 ERA is the highest of any pitcher with four or more career appearances.

Moraga pitched in Minor League Baseball until 2003. He returned to professional baseball in 2008 when he pitched in the independent Northern League. He was a Northern League All-Star in 2008 with the Joliet JackHammers. His final season came in 2009 with the Edmonton Trappers.

As of October 2010, he was selling baseball lessons in Solano County, California.
