= Tomás de la Rosa =

Dominican baseball player (born 1978)

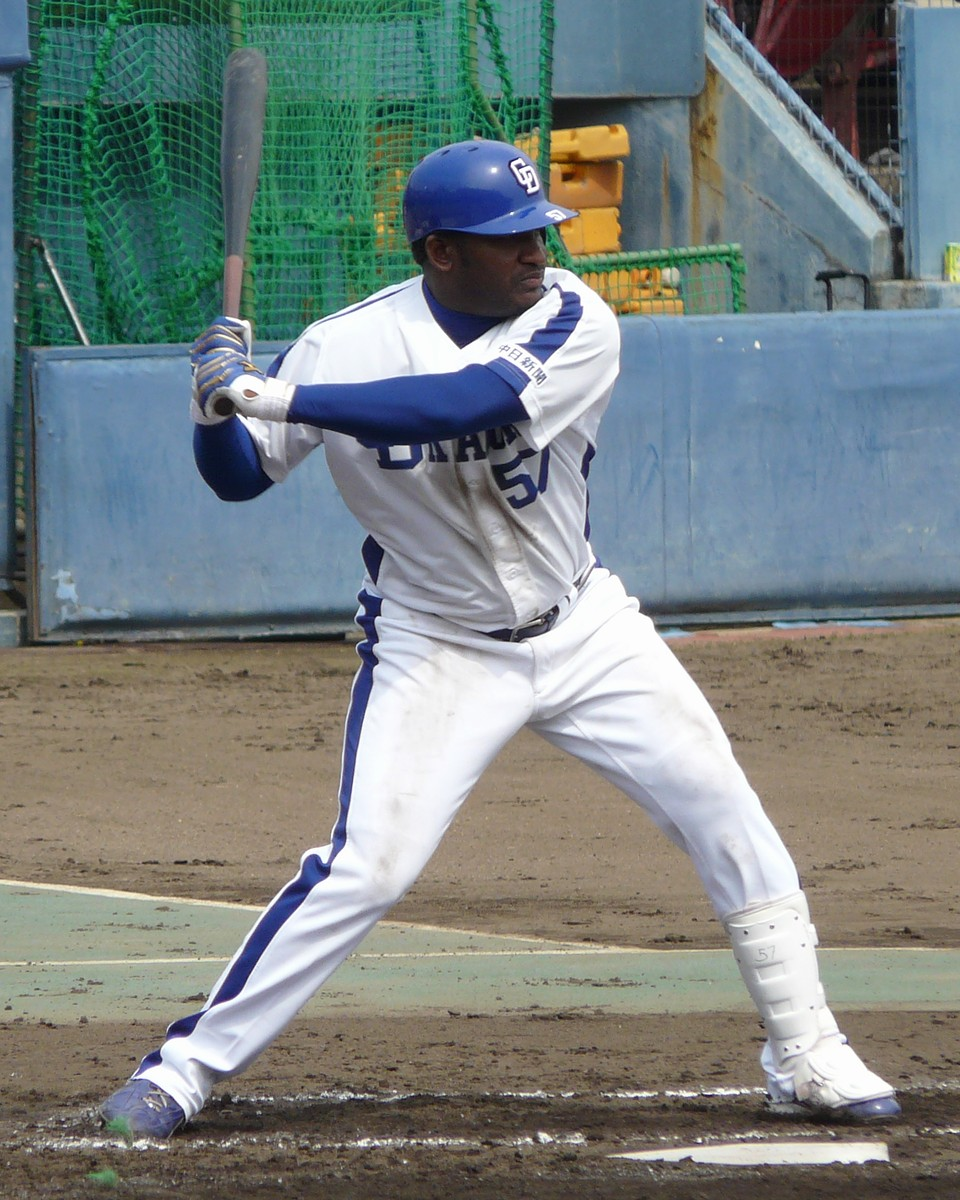
- Shortstop
- Born: January 28, 1978 (age 48); La Victoria, Dominican Republic
- Batted: Right Threw: Right

MLB debut
- July 17, 2000, for the Montreal Expos

Last MLB appearance
- October 1, 2006, for the San Francisco Giants

MLB statistics
- Batting average: .289
- Home runs: 2
- Runs batted in: 10
- Stats at Baseball Reference

Teams
- Montreal Expos (2000–2001); San Francisco Giants (2006); Chunichi Dragons (2008–2009)

Tomás Agramonte de la Rosa (born January 28, 1978) is a Dominican former professional baseball infielder. He last played for the Chunichi Dragons of Japan's Central League. He previously played for the Montreal Expos and San Francisco Giants of Major League Baseball.
