= Chris Widger =

American baseball player (born 1971)

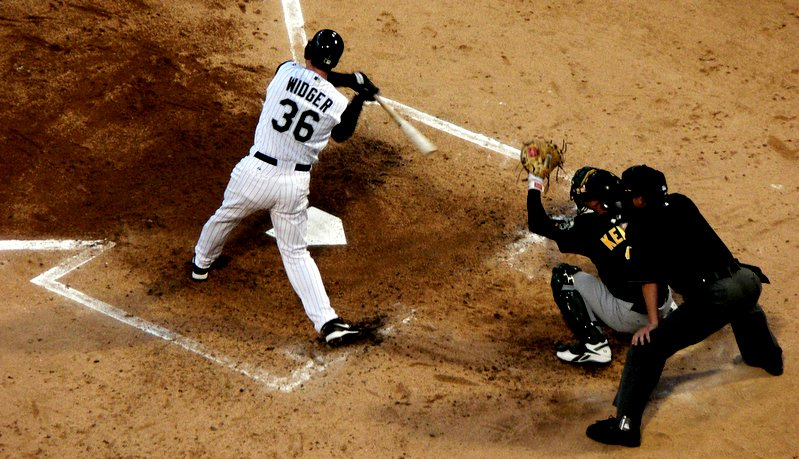

Sussex County Miners – No. 26
- Catcher / Manager
- Born: May 21, 1971 (age 54); Wilmington, Delaware, U.S.
- Batted: Right Threw: Right

MLB debut
- June 23, 1995, for the Seattle Mariners

Last MLB appearance
- September 15, 2006, for the Baltimore Orioles

MLB statistics
- Batting average: .238
- Home runs: 55
- Runs batted in: 222
- Stats at Baseball Reference

Teams
- Seattle Mariners (1995–1996); Montreal Expos (1997–2000); Seattle Mariners (2000); New York Yankees (2002); St. Louis Cardinals (2003); Chicago White Sox (2005–2006); Baltimore Orioles (2006)

Career highlights and awards
- World Series champion (2005)

Christopher Jon Widger (born May 21, 1971) is an American professional baseball coach and former catcher who is currently the manager for the Sussex County Miners of the Frontier League. He played for the Seattle Mariners (1995-1996, 2000), Montreal Expos (1997-2000), New York Yankees (2002), St. Louis Cardinals (2003), Chicago White Sox (2005-2006), and Baltimore Orioles (2006).

In January 2020, after a few seasons as a minor league bench coach, he was named the manager of the Wilmington Blue Rocks, then promoted to similar positions with the Quad Cities River Bandits in 2021 and the Northwest Arkansas Naturals in 2022.

== Early life ==
A native of Wilmington, Delaware, Widger graduated from Pennsville Memorial High School in Pennsville Township, New Jersey, and George Mason University, where he played college baseball. In 1991, he played collegiate summer baseball with the Cotuit Kettleers of the Cape Cod Baseball League.

== Career ==
A third round pick of the Seattle Mariners in the 1992 Major League Baseball draft, Widger made his major league debut in June 1995. In his first start for Seattle, he was the catcher for a combined shutout by Tim Belcher and Bobby Ayala.

Widger established himself as an everyday player during his tenure with the Expos, who acquired him from Seattle, along with Matt Wagner and Trey Moore in a trade for Jeff Fassero and Alex Pacheco. He had his best major league seasons with the Expos in 1998 and 1999, playing in 125 and 124 games, respectively, and hitting double-digit home runs in both seasons.

In August 2000, he was traded back to Seattle for players to be named later. Widger missed the 2001 season due to shoulder surgery. His sister died that year from an interaction of her prescription medications. Widger and his wife built a new house so that Widger's brother-in-law and five nieces could move into Widger's old home. Widger signed with the Yankees in 2002, then with the St. Louis Cardinals in 2003.

After playing the 2004 season with the independent Camden Riversharks, Widger made it back to MLB with the Chicago White Sox as a backup where he won a World Series in 2005. He played catcher, but also played at first base, third base, and once in the outfield. On July 23, 2006, he was placed on waivers by the White Sox, who had acquired Sandy Alomar Jr. to replace him as their backup catcher. On August 4, 2006, Widger was signed by the Orioles to a contract for the rest of the 2006 season.

He served as the Camden Riversharks pitching coach from 2012 to 2014, before being named the team's manager on December 5, 2014. In 2016, he became the Bench Coach for the Wilmington Blue Rocks, the Advanced-A affiliate of the Kansas City Royals. He was named Wilmington's manager in January 2020. In 2021, he was named the manager of the Quad Cities River Bandits (the new High-A affiliate of the Kansas City Royals). The River Bandits won the High-A Central League championship, and Widger was named the High-A Central Manager of the Year. In 2022, he managed the Northwest Arkansas Naturals (Double-A affiliate of the Royals). He parted ways with the Royals organization following the 2022 season.

In November 2022, Widger was announced as new manager for the Sussex County Miners of the independent Frontier League for the 2023 season.
