= Trace Coquillette =

American baseball player

- Third baseman / Second baseman
- Born: June 4, 1974 (age 51); Carmichael, California
- Batted: Right Threw: Right

MLB debut
- September 7, 1999, for the Montreal Expos

Last MLB appearance
- October 1, 2000, for the Montreal Expos

MLB statistics
- Batting average: .231
- Runs: 8
- Hits: 25
- Stats at Baseball Reference

Teams
- Montreal Expos (1999–2000)

Trace Robert Coquillette (born June 4, 1974 in Carmichael, California) is a retired Major League Baseball third baseman and second baseman. He played during two seasons at the major league level for the Montreal Expos.

== Career ==
Coquillette attended Casa Roble High School in Sacramento County, California where, in 1992, he was named first team all-city by the Sacramento Bee along with Derrek Lee and Geoff Jenkins. He played one season of college baseball at Sacramento City College in 1993 before being drafted by the Montreal Expos in the tenth round of the 1993 Major League Baseball draft. Coquillette was assigned to the Gulf Coast Expos to begin his professional career in 1993. On September 7, 1998, he was called up to the Major Leagues along with Ted Lilly, Carl Pavano and Fernando Seguignol. He made his debut that day against the Colorado Rockies at Olympic Stadium. He started at third base and was hitless in three at bats. Coquillette would appear in 17 games for the Expos that season and 34 games the following year. He would continue to appear in the minor leagues until 2005, playing in the farm systems of the Cleveland Indians, Detroit Tigers, Florida Marlins, Boston Red Sox and Chicago White Sox.
