= Terry Jones (baseball) =

American baseball player (born 1971)

- Outfielder
- Born: February 15, 1971 (age 55); Birmingham, Alabama, U.S.
- Batted: Both Threw: Right

MLB debut
- September 9, 1996, for the Colorado Rockies

Last MLB appearance
- October 7, 2001, for the Montreal Expos

MLB statistics
- Batting average: .242
- Hits: 128
- Stolen bases: 27
- Stats at Baseball Reference

Teams
- Colorado Rockies (1996); Montreal Expos (1998–2001)

Terry Lee Jones (born February 15, 1971) is an American retired professional baseball player who played outfield in Major League Baseball (MLB) from 1996 to 2001. He played college baseball at the University of North Alabama in 1993. He led the Gulf South Conference in stolen bases that year.
