= Yohanny Valera =

Dominican baseball player (born 1976)

- Catcher
- Born: August 17, 1976 (age 49); Santo Domingo, Dominican Republic
- Bats: Right Throws: Right

MLB debut
- September 13, 2000, for the Montreal Expos

MLB statistics
- Batting average: .000
- Home runs: 0
- Runs batted in: 0
- Stats at Baseball Reference

Teams
- Montreal Expos (2000)

Yohanny Valera (born August 29, 1976) is a Dominican former professional baseball catcher who played in Major League Baseball (MLB) for the Montreal Expos in the 2000 season. He played in seven career games, with no hits in 10 at-bats, with one walk.

== Career ==
He was signed by the New York Mets as an amateur free agent in 1993 and also played in the Montreal Expos, Tampa Bay Devil Rays, and Detroit Tigers organizations before leaving organized baseball after the 2003 season. Valera also played in for the Aces, a traveling team in the Northeast League, in 2004. He spent a season with the Worcester Tornadoes of the Can-Am League and won the league championship in 2005, then spent a year with Italy's Bbc Grosseto. He returned to the US in 2007 playing for Worcester, then the Sussex Skyhawks in 2008, and one final professional season with Worcester in 2009.
