= Felipe Lira =

Venezuelan baseball player (born 1972)

- Pitcher
- Born: April 26, 1972 (age 54); Santa Teresa del Tuy, Miranda, Venezuela
- Batted: Right Threw: Right

MLB debut
- April 27, 1995, for the Detroit Tigers

Last MLB appearance
- May 21, 2001, for the Montreal Expos

MLB statistics
- Win–loss record: 26–46
- Earned run average: 5.30
- Strikeouts: 346

CPBL statistics
- Win–loss record: 0–0
- Earned run average: 5.40
- Strikeouts: 3
- Stats at Baseball Reference

Teams
- Detroit Tigers (1995–1997); Seattle Mariners (1997–1998); Detroit Tigers (1999); Montreal Expos (2000–2001); Macoto Cobras (2004)

Felipe Antonio Lira (born April 26, 1972) is a Venezuelan former professional baseball pitcher who played in Major League Baseball for the Detroit Tigers (1995-1997), Seattle Mariners (1997-1998) and Montreal Expos (2000-2001).

== Career ==
In a six-year career, Lira compiled a 26–46 record with 348 strikeouts and a 5.32 ERA in 577 innings. As a batter with the Expos, he hit .211 (4-for-19) with two home runs, both hit in 2000. On August 29, 1995, Lira notched his only MLB save. He recorded the final out of the game to preserve a 7–5 Tigers victory over the Chicago White Sox. He saved the game for starter Sean Bergman. Lira was the Tigers Opening Day starter in 1996, taking the loss against the Minnesota Twins. On September 6, he gave up Eddie Murray's 500th home run.

Detroit traded Lira and Omar Olivares to the Mariners for Scott Sanders, Dean Crow, and Carlos Villalobos on July 18, 1997, following a plea from manager Lou Piniella to add pitching. Following a 4–0 stretch in May with the Tigers, Lira lost his final seven decisions in 1997 and finished the season in the minors. Lira returned to the Tigers in 1999, finishing his MLB career with two seasons with Montreal.

== See also ==
- List of players from Venezuela in Major League Baseball
