= Yovanny Lara =

Dominican baseball player (born 1975)

- Pitcher
- Born: September 20, 1975 (age 49); San Cristóbal, Dominican Republic
- Batted: Right Threw: Right

MLB debut
- June 28, 2000, for the Montreal Expos

Last MLB appearance
- July 14, 2000, for the Montreal Expos

MLB statistics
- Win–loss record: 0–0
- Earned run average: 6.35
- Strikeouts: 3
- Stats at Baseball Reference

Teams
- Montreal Expos (2000)

Yovanny Lara (born September 20, 1975) is a Dominican Republic former professional baseball pitcher. He played in Major League Baseball (MLB) for the Montreal Expos in 2000.
