= Scott Forster =

American baseball player

- Pitcher
- Born: October 27, 1971 (age 54); Philadelphia, Pennsylvania, U.S.
- Batted: Right Threw: Left

MLB debut
- June 18, 2000, for the Montreal Expos

Last MLB appearance
- September 29, 2000, for the Montreal Expos

MLB statistics
- Win–loss record: 0–1
- Earned run average: 7.88
- Strikeouts: 23
- Stats at Baseball Reference

Teams
- Montreal Expos (2000)

Scott Christian Forster (born October 27, 1971) is an American former professional baseball pitcher. He played in Major League Baseball (MLB) for the Montreal Expos in 2000.
