= Jeremy Powell =

American baseball coach (born 1976)

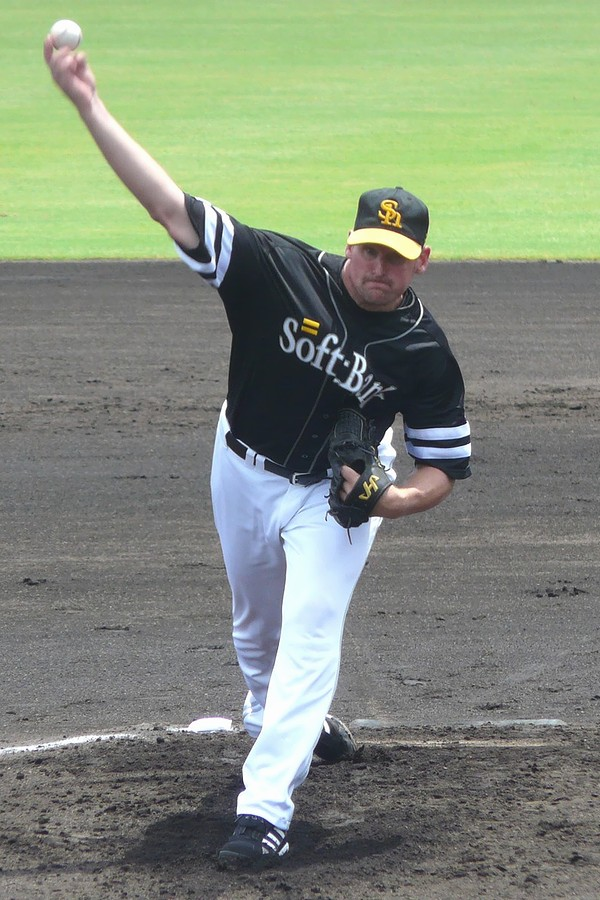
- Powell with the Fukuoka SoftBank Hawks
- Pitcher
- Born: June 18, 1976 (age 49); La Mirada, California, U.S.
- Batted: Right Threw: Right

Professional debut
- MLB: July 23, 1998, for the Montreal Expos
- NPB: 2001, for the Osaka Kintetsu Buffaloes

Last appearance
- MLB: October 1, 2000, for the Montreal Expos
- NPB: 2008, for the Fukuoka SoftBank Hawks

MLB statistics
- Win–loss record: 5–16
- Earned run average: 5.84
- Strikeouts: 77

NPB statistics
- Win–loss record: 69–65
- Earned run average: 3.97
- Strikeouts: 858
- Stats at Baseball Reference

Teams
- Montreal Expos (1998–2000); Osaka Kintetsu Buffaloes (2001–2004); Orix Buffaloes (2005); Yomiuri Giants (2006–2007); Fukuoka SoftBank Hawks (2008)

Jeremy Robert Powell (born June 18, 1976) is an American former professional baseball player. He is currently the pitching coach for the AAA Jacksonville Jumbo Shrimp. He played for the Montreal Expos in Major League Baseball (MLB).

== Career ==
=== Montreal Expos ===
Powell was drafted out of high school by the Montreal Expos in the 4th round of the 1994 Major League Baseball draft and assigned to the Rookie-level Gulf Coast Expos. In 9 starts for them in 1994, he went 2–2 with a 2.93 ERA and 36 strikeouts. In 1995 with the Low-A Vermont Expos, he made 15 starts and had an ERA of 4.34. He also made one start for Single-A Albany, giving up 1 run in 6 innings and getting the win. Powell spent all of 1996 with the Single-A Delmarva Shorebirds, where he went 12–9 with a 3.02 ERA, enough to earn a promotion to High-A West Palm Beach to begin 1997. With West Palm Beach, he recorded 121 strikeouts and a 3.02 ERA. In 1998 with the Double-A Harrisburg Senators, he went 9–7 with an ERA of 3.00 and was promoted to the major leagues for the first time after the All-Star Break.

Powell made his major league debut on July 23, 1998, but lost despite giving up only 1 run in 6 innings. He made 6 more appearances for the Expos and ended the season with a major league ERA of 7.92. He began 1999 with Triple-A Ottawa and posted a 2.97 ERA in 16 starts. This earned him a midseason promotion, and he spent the rest of the season in the majors. He made 17 starts for the Expos, perhaps his best being 8 shutout innings against the San Diego Padres on August 9. In 2000, he struggled in both the majors and minors. Powell went 5–13 with a 6.91 ERA in 25 games with Ottawa. With Montreal, he went 0–3 with a 7.96 ERA in 11 games. After the season, he became a free agent and signed with the San Diego Padres.

Powell was assigned to the minor leagues to begin 2001, but after going 4–2 with a 1.59 ERA and a .77 WHIP in 11 starts, he went to Japan to play.

=== Buffaloes ===
He signed with the Osaka Kintetsu Buffaloes of Nippon Professional Baseball, where, after a shaky first season, he became one of NPB's most successful pitchers. He played for the Buffaloes through 2004, winning 17, 14, and 8 games in his last three seasons.

In 2005, the Buffaloes merged with the Orix Bluewave to form the Orix Buffaloes. Powell won 14 games and pitched 200 innings in 2005.

=== Yomiuri Giants ===
In 2006, he joined the Yomiuri Giants after the season. With Yomiuri for two seasons, he went only 10–12 after missing most of the 2007 season.

=== Fukuoka SoftBank Hawks ===
In 2008, he joined the Fukuoka SoftBank Hawks, but went 2–6 in 12 starts.

=== Pittsburgh Pirates ===
In January 2009, Powell left the Hawks and signed a minor league contract with the Pittsburgh Pirates.

He was the pitching coach for the Greensboro Grasshoppers.

=== As Coach ===
As of 2018, he is the pitching coach for the AAA New Orleans Baby Cakes.
