= Matt Skrmetta =

American baseball player (born 1972)

- Pitcher
- Born: November 6, 1972 (age 52); Biloxi, Mississippi, U.S.
- Batted: Switch Threw: Right

Professional debut
- MLB: June 6, 2000, for the Montreal Expos
- NPB: March 29, 2003, for the Fukuoka Daiei Hawks

Last appearance
- MLB: September 27, 2000, for the Pittsburgh Pirates
- NPB: April 23, 2005, for the Tohoku Rakuten Golden Eagles

MLB statistics
- Win–loss record: 2–2
- Earned run average: 11.66
- Strikeouts: 11

NPB statistics
- Win–loss record: 2–1
- Earned run average: 4.56
- Strikeouts: 18
- Stats at Baseball Reference

Teams
- Montreal Expos (2000); Pittsburgh Pirates (2000); Fukuoka Daiei Hawks (2003); Tohoku Rakuten Golden Eagles (2005)

Matthew Leland Skrmetta (born November 6, 1972) is an American former professional baseball pitcher. He played during one season in Major League Baseball (MLB) with the Montreal Expos and Pittsburgh Pirates in 2000. He also played two seasons in the Nippon Professional Baseball (NPB), 2003 for the Fukuoka Daiei Hawks and 2005 for the Tohoku Rakuten Golden Eagles. He holds the record for playing for the most professional teams, with 25.

== Amateur career ==
He graduated from Satellite High School in 1990. He led Satellite to the 1990 Class 3A State Championship baseball game where they lost to Pace High School 13–3.

== Professional career ==
Skrmetta was drafted by the Detroit Tigers in the 26th round of the 1993 amateur draft. Skrmetta played his first professional season with their rookie league Bristol Tigers in 1993.

In 2002, Skrmetta was 8–0 with one save, 58 strikeouts in 61 innings pitched for a 2.51 ERA while pitching for the Omaha Royals, the Kansas City Royals' Triple-A affiliate.

Skrmetta broke former major league baseball pitcher Mike Morgan's record when he played with the Chicago White Sox Triple-A affiliate Charlotte Knights in 2006. Skrmetta played for a record 25 professional teams and in 13 organizations. In 2007, he played for his 25th and last professional team, the Road Warriors of the independent Atlantic League.
