= Fernando Seguignol =

Panamanian baseball player (born 1975)

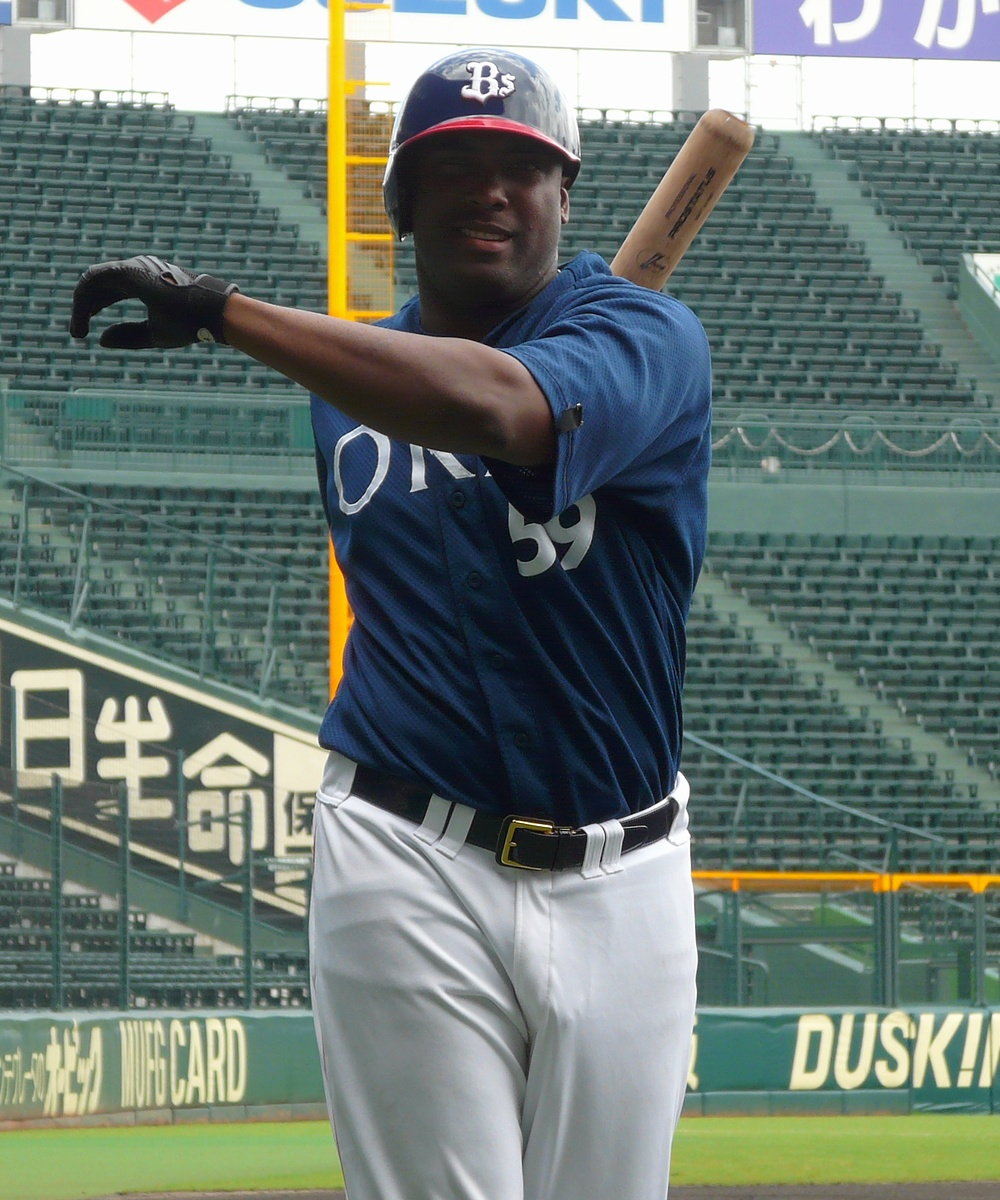
- First baseman
- Born: January 19, 1975 (age 51); Bocas Del Toro, Panama
- Batted: Switch Threw: Right

Professional debut
- MLB: September 5, 1998, for the Montreal Expos
- NPB: March 30, 2002, for the Orix BlueWave

Last appearance
- MLB: September 28, 2003, for the New York Yankees
- NPB: July 21, 2010, for the Orix Buffaloes

MLB statistics
- Batting average: .249
- Home runs: 17
- Runs batted in: 40

NPB statistics
- Batting average: .273
- Home runs: 172
- Runs batted in: 483
- Stats at Baseball Reference

Teams
- Montreal Expos (1998–2001); Orix BlueWave (2002); New York Yankees (2003); Hokkaido Nippon-Ham Fighters (2004–2007); Tohoku Rakuten Golden Eagles (2008–2009); Orix Buffaloes (2010)

Career highlights and awards
- Pacific League Leader of Home Run (2004); 2× Pacific League Best Nine Award (2004, 2006)

Fernando Alfredo Seguignol Garcia (born January 19, 1975) is a Panamanian former Major League Baseball first baseman and outfielder. Seguignol also played eight years in Nippon Professional Baseball. A switch hitter, Seguignol is regarded as the best switch-hitter ever to play in Japan, along with Orestes Destrade.

== Playing career ==
Seguignol was signed as an amateur free agent in 1993 by the New York Yankees at the age of 18. Yankees minor league manager Trey Hillman recommended Seguignol try switch-hitting. (Years later, Hillman became the manager of the Hokkaido Nippon-Ham Fighters, and was reunited with Seguignol in Japan.)

He spent several years in the minors before making his major league debut in 1998 with the Montreal Expos after being traded by the Yankees on April 5, 1995, along with cash, for John Wetteland. He played a career high 76 games in 2000 with the Expos, hitting .278 with 10 home runs and 22 RBI playing in the outfield.

Seguignol was released by the Expos in 2001, and signed with the Orix BlueWave of the Japanese Pacific League in 2002. He made appearances as a first baseman and designated hitter with the BlueWave, and hit home runs from both sides of the plate two games in a row, from June 5 to June 6 (becoming the first player to do so in Japanese baseball history). However, Seguignol was inconsistent overall, ending the season with a .204 batting average. He was released at the end of the season, and returned to the major leagues after signing with the New York Yankees.

He spent most of 2003 with the Yankees' Triple-A affiliate Columbus Clippers, and led the league in home runs and RBI (he played in five major league games that year with the Yankees).

He was scouted by the Hokkaido Nippon-Ham Fighters, and traveled to Japan for the second time in 2004. He hit well over .400 in his first month, and ended the year hitting .306 with 44 home runs and 108 RBI, tying Nobuhiko Matsunaka for the most home runs in the league to win the Best Nine Award at designated hitter. He remained with the Fighters until 2008, and had continued success, leading the league in doubles in 2006 to win a second Best Nine Award.

In 2008, he played for Olmecas de Tabasco in Liga Mexicana de Beisbol before signing with the Detroit Tigers on June 12, 2008; he was released by the Tigers on July 21. But about a week after his release, he was acquired by the Tohoku Rakuten Golden Eagles. He hit 13 home runs in 39 games (157 at-bats), with a .324 batting average and 40 RBI in that season. He was chosen on the 1st round roster for Panama team playing in 2009 World Baseball Classic.

In 2010, after playing for the Newark Bears, he played for the Orix Buffaloes in the Japanese Pacific League, where he had previously played in 2002.

Seguignol holds the Japanese single-season record for home runs among switch-hitters (44), and homered from both sides of the plate eight separate times in Japan, an NPB all-time record. He also homered against 13 different Japanese teams; the only other player to have done this is Julio Zuleta.

== Post-playing career ==
On November 2, 2021, Seguignol was hired by the Saitama Seibu Lions to be in charge of the team's international affairs, stationed in the USA.

== Personal life ==
Seguignol is married and has two children, Kendall and Jabari. He lives in Wellington, Florida.
