= Trey Moore (baseball) =

American baseball player (born 1972)

- Pitcher
- Born: October 2, 1972 (age 53); Houston, Texas, U.S.
- Batted: Left Threw: Left

Professional debut
- MLB: April 5, 1998, for the Montreal Expos
- NPB: March 30, 2002, for the Hanshin Tigers

Last appearance
- MLB: July 15, 2001, for the Atlanta Braves
- NPB: July 30, 2004, for the Orix BlueWave

MLB statistics
- Win–loss record: 3–10
- Earned run average: 5.83
- Strikeouts: 60

NPB statistics
- Win–loss record: 26–23
- Earned run average: 4.28
- Strikeouts: 273
- Stats at Baseball Reference

Teams
- Montreal Expos (1998, 2000); Atlanta Braves (2001); Hanshin Tigers (2002–2003); Orix BlueWave (2004)

Warren Neal "Trey" Moore III (born October 2, 1972) is an American former professional baseball pitcher. He pitched parts of three seasons in Major League Baseball (MLB), between 1998 and 2001, for the Montreal Expos and Atlanta Braves. He also played three seasons in the Nippon Professional Baseball (NPB), from 2002 until 2004, for the Hanshin Tigers, and Orix BlueWave.

A native of Houston, Texas, Moore attended Keller High School and Texas A&M University. In 1993, he played collegiate summer baseball with the Chatham A's of the Cape Cod Baseball League. He was selected by the Seattle Mariners in the second round of the 1994 MLB draft.

== Sources ==
- Career statistics from MLB · ESPN · Baseball Reference · Fangraphs · Baseball Reference (Minors) · Retrosheet · Baseball Almanac, or Retrosheet
