= 2000 Atlanta Braves season =

2000 Atlanta Braves
- National League East champions
- League: National League
- Division: East
- Ballpark: Turner Field
- City: Atlanta
- Record: 95–67 (.586)
- Divisional place: 1st
- Owners: Time Warner
- General managers: John Schuerholz
- Managers: Bobby Cox
- Television: TBS Superstation; Turner South (Pete Van Wieren, Skip Caray, Don Sutton, Joe Simpson); Fox Sports South (Al Downing, Brett Butler, Bob Rathbun)
- Radio: WSB (AM) (Pete Van Wieren, Skip Caray, Don Sutton, Joe Simpson); WATB (Marcelo Godoy, Jose Manuel Flores)

The 2000 Atlanta Braves season marked the franchise's 35th season in Atlanta along with the 125th season in the National League and 130th overall, entering the season as defending National League champions. The Braves won their sixth consecutive division title, however, the 2000 season would mark the first time since 1990 that the Braves did not appear in the NLCS in a non-strike season. The Braves failed to defend its National League championship and go to their sixth World Series in ten years. One of the highlights of the season was that the All-Star Game was held at Turner Field in Atlanta.

== Offseason ==
- December 22, 1999: Bret Boone was traded by the Atlanta Braves with Ryan Klesko and Jason Shiell to the San Diego Padres for Wally Joyner, Reggie Sanders, and Quilvio Veras.
- January 12, 2000: Howard Battle was purchased by the Hanshin Tigers (Japan Central) from the Atlanta Braves.
- January 20, 2000: Trenidad Hubbard was signed as a free agent with the Atlanta Braves.
- January 28, 2000: Bobby Bonilla was signed as a free agent with the Atlanta Braves.
- February 22, 2000: Steve Avery was signed as a free agent with the Atlanta Braves.
- March 31, 2000: Randall Simon was released by the Atlanta Braves.

== Regular season ==
=== Opening Day starters ===
- Quilvio Veras – 2B
- Reggie Sanders – LF
- Chipper Jones – 3B
- Brian Jordan – RF
- Andrés Galarraga – 1B
- Andruw Jones – CF
- Eddie Pérez – C
- Walt Weiss – SS
- Greg Maddux – P

=== All-Star game ===
The 2000 Major League Baseball All-Star Game was played in Atlanta. It was the 71st midsummer classic featuring the American League (AL) and National League (NL). The game was played on July 11, 2000 at Turner Field.

Five members of the Braves were part of the All-Star Game. Andrés Galarraga and Chipper Jones started at first base and third base, respectively. Tom Glavine, Greg Maddux and Andruw Jones were part of the team as well.

The 2000 All-Star Game was one of the few occurrences in which the manager of the host team also managed the home team of the game, in this case, the National League (Bobby Cox had led the Braves to the World Series the previous year earning the right to manage the National League). The final score was 6–3 in favor of the American League.

=== Season standings ===
NL East
| Team | W | L | Pct. | GB | Home | Road |
|---|---|---|---|---|---|---|
| Atlanta Braves | 95 | 67 | .586 | — | 51‍–‍30 | 44‍–‍37 |
| New York Mets | 94 | 68 | .580 | 1 | 55‍–‍26 | 39‍–‍42 |
| Florida Marlins | 79 | 82 | .491 | 15½ | 43‍–‍38 | 36‍–‍44 |
| Montreal Expos | 67 | 95 | .414 | 28 | 37‍–‍44 | 30‍–‍51 |
| Philadelphia Phillies | 65 | 97 | .401 | 30 | 34‍–‍47 | 31‍–‍50 |

=== Record vs. opponents ===
2000 National League record Source: NL Standings Head-to-Head
| Team | AZ | ATL | CHC | CIN | COL | FLA | HOU | LAD | MIL | MON | NYM | PHI | PIT | SD | SF | STL | AL |
|---|---|---|---|---|---|---|---|---|---|---|---|---|---|---|---|---|---|
| Arizona | — | 3–6 | 5–4 | 2–5 | 7–6 | 4–5 | 6–1 | 7–6 | 4–5 | 4–5 | 2–7 | 8–1 | 7–2 | 9–4 | 6–7 | 5–4 | 6–9 |
| Atlanta | 6–3 | — | 4–5 | 2–5 | 5–4 | 6–6 | 5–4 | 7–2 | 6–3 | 6–7 | 7–6 | 8–5 | 5–2 | 8–1 | 6–3 | 3–4 | 11–7 |
| Chicago | 4–5 | 5–4 | — | 4–8 | 4–5 | 1–6 | 5–7 | 3–6 | 6–7 | 4–5 | 2–5 | 6–3 | 3–9 | 3–5 | 4–5 | 3–10 | 8–7 |
| Cincinnati | 5–2 | 5–2 | 8–4 | — | 6–3 | 3–6 | 7–5 | 4–5 | 5–8–1 | 6–3 | 5–4 | 3–4 | 7–6 | 4–5 | 3–6 | 7–6 | 7–8 |
| Colorado | 6–7 | 4–5 | 5–4 | 3–6 | — | 4–5 | 5–4 | 4–9 | 4–5 | 7–2 | 3–6 | 6–3 | 7–2 | 7–6 | 6–7 | 5–3 | 6–6 |
| Florida | 5–4 | 6–6 | 6–1 | 6–3 | 5–4 | — | 3–5 | 2–7 | 3–4 | 7–6 | 6–6 | 9–4 | 5–4 | 2–7 | 3–6 | 3–6 | 8–9 |
| Houston | 1–6 | 4–5 | 7–5 | 5–7 | 4–5 | 5–3 | — | 3–6 | 7–6 | 4–5 | 2–5 | 5–4 | 10–3 | 2–7 | 1–8 | 6–6 | 6–9 |
| Los Angeles | 6–7 | 2–7 | 6–3 | 5–4 | 9–4 | 7–2 | 6–3 | — | 3–4 | 5–3 | 4–5 | 5–4 | 4–5 | 8–5 | 7–5 | 3–6 | 6–9 |
| Milwaukee | 5–4 | 3–6 | 7–6 | 8–5–1 | 5–4 | 4–3 | 6–7 | 4–3 | — | 4–5 | 2–7 | 2–5 | 7–5 | 2–7 | 3–6 | 5–7 | 6–9 |
| Montreal | 5–4 | 7–6 | 5–4 | 3–6 | 2–7 | 6–7 | 5–4 | 3–5 | 5–4 | — | 3–9 | 5–7 | 3–4 | 3–6 | 3–6 | 2–5 | 7–11 |
| New York | 7–2 | 6–7 | 5–2 | 4–5 | 6–3 | 6–6 | 5–2 | 5–4 | 7–2 | 9–3 | — | 6–7 | 7–2 | 3–6 | 3–5 | 6–3 | 9–9 |
| Philadelphia | 1–8 | 5–8 | 3–6 | 4–3 | 3–6 | 4–9 | 4–5 | 4–5 | 5–2 | 7–5 | 7–6 | — | 3–6 | 2–5 | 2–7 | 2–7 | 9–9 |
| Pittsburgh | 2–7 | 2–5 | 9–3 | 6–7 | 2–7 | 4–5 | 3–10 | 5–4 | 5–7 | 4–3 | 2–7 | 6–3 | — | 7–2 | 2–6 | 4–8 | 6–9 |
| San Diego | 4–9 | 1–8 | 5–3 | 5–4 | 6–7 | 7–2 | 7–2 | 5–8 | 7–2 | 6–3 | 6–3 | 5–2 | 2–7 | — | 5–7 | 0–9 | 5–10 |
| San Francisco | 7–6 | 3–6 | 5–4 | 6–3 | 7–6 | 6–3 | 8–1 | 5–7 | 6–3 | 6–3 | 5–3 | 7–2 | 6–2 | 7–5 | — | 5–4 | 8–7 |
| St. Louis | 4–5 | 4–3 | 10–3 | 6–7 | 3–5 | 6–3 | 6–6 | 6–3 | 7–5 | 5–2 | 3–6 | 7–2 | 8–4 | 9–0 | 4–5 | — | 7–8 |

=== Transactions ===
- June 5, 2000: Kelly Johnson was drafted by the Atlanta Braves in the 1st round (38th pick) of the 2000 amateur draft. Player signed June 12, 2000.
- June 5, 2000: Tony Gwynn, Jr. was drafted by the Atlanta Braves in the 33rd round of the 2000 amateur draft, but did not sign.
- July 29, 2000: Stan Belinda was signed as a free agent with the Atlanta Braves.
- July 31, 2000: B. J. Surhoff was traded by the Baltimore Orioles with Gabe Molina to the Atlanta Braves for Trenidad Hubbard, Fernando Lunar, and Luis Rivera.
- August 25, 2000: Rich Amaral was signed as a free agent with the Atlanta Braves.
- September 12, 2000: Stan Belinda was released by the Atlanta Braves.

=== Roster ===
2000 Atlanta Braves
**Roster**
| **Pitchers**: 48 Andy Ashby; 36 Stan Belinda; 19 John Burkett; 48 Bruce Chen; 47 Tom Glavine; 50 Scott Kamieniecki; 46 Kerry Ligtenberg; 31 Greg Maddux; 68 Jason Marquis; 30 Kevin McGlinchy; 38 Greg McMichael; 34 Kevin Millwood; 56 Gabe Molina; 45 Terry Mulholland; 37 Mike Remlinger; 72 Luis Rivera; 49 John Rocker; 40 Rudy Seánez; 58 Chris Seelbach; 56 Dave Stevens; 70 Ismael Villegas; 50 Don Wengert | **Catchers**: 9 Paul Bako; 27 Mike Hubbard; 8 Javy López; 20 Fernando Lunar; 12 Eddie Pérez; **Infielders**: 2 Mark DeRosa; 1 Rafael Furcal; 14 Andrés Galarraga; 28 Wes Helms; 10 Chipper Jones; 24 Wally Joyner; 7 Keith Lockhart; 20 Tim Unroe; 4 Quilvio Veras; 22 Walt Weiss | **Outfielders**: 23 Bobby Bonilla; 27 Trenidad Hubbard; 25 Andruw Jones; 33 Brian Jordan; 26 George Lombard; 16 Reggie Sanders; 11 Steve Sisco; 15 B. J. Surhoff; 57 Pedro Swann; **Other batters**: 19 Brian Hunter | **Manager**: 6 Bobby Cox; **Coaches**: 39 Pat Corrales (bench); 52 Bobby Dews (bullpen); 17 Glenn Hubbard (1st base); 54 Leo Mazzone (pitching); 16 Merv Rettenmund (hitting); 5 Ned Yost (3rd base) |

=== Game log ===
2000 Game Log: 95–67 (Home: 51–30; Away: 44–37)
April: 18–6 (Home: 13–2; Away: 5–4)

| # | Date | Opponent | Score | Win | Loss | Save | Attendance | Record |
|---|---|---|---|---|---|---|---|---|
| 1 | April 3 | Rockies | 2–0 | **Maddux** (1–0) | Astacio (0–1) | **Remlinger** (1) | 42,255 | 1–0 |
| 2 | April 4 | Rockies | 3–5 | Tavarez (1–0) | **Burkett** (0–1) | Jimenez (1) | 26,132 | 1–1 |
| 3 | April 5 | Rockies | 9–6 | **Chen** (1–0) | Aybar (0–1) | **Ligtenberg** (1) | 30,008 | 2–1 |
| 4 | April 7 | Giants | 2–6 | Gardner (1–0) | **Mulholland** (0–1) | — | 35,343 | 2–2 |
| 5 | April 8 | Giants | 7–5 | **Maddux** (2–0) | Hernandez (0–2) | **Ligtenberg** (2) | 35,938 | 3–2 |
| 6 | April 9 | Giants | 9–3 | **Glavine** (1–0) | Ortiz (1–1) | — | 32,654 | 4–2 |
| 7 | April 10 | @ Cubs | 3–4 | Guthrie (1–1) | **Ligtenberg** (0–1) | — | 38,655 | 4–3 |
| 8 | April 12 | @ Cubs | 4–11 | Farnsworth (1–1) | **Mulholland** (0–2) | — | 26,838 | 4–4 |
| 9 | April 13 | @ Cubs | 2–3 | Guthrie (2–1) | **Remlinger** (0–1) | — | 20,152 | 4–5 |
| 10 | April 14 | @ Brewers | 6–3 | **Glavine** (2–0) | Woodard (0–2) | **Remlinger** (2) | 10,171 | 5–5 |
| 11 | April 15 | @ Brewers | 3–6 | Weathers (1–0) | **Burkett** (0–2) | Wickman (3) | 24,755 | 5–6 |
| 12 | April 16 | @ Brewers | 2–1 | **Mulholland** (1–2) | Stull (0–1) | **Remlinger** (3) | 12,004 | 6–6 |
| 13 | April 18 | Phillies | 4–3 (12) | **Rivera** (1–0) | Reyes (0–1) | — | 34,903 | 7–6 |
| 14 | April 19 | Phillies | 10–1 | **Glavine** (3–0) | Wolf (1–1) | — | 29,992 | 8–6 |
| 15 | April 20 | Phillies | 6–4 | **Millwood** (1–0) | Aldred (1–2) | **Rocker** (1) | 31,451 | 9–6 |
| 16 | April 21 | Pirates | 6–2 | **Mulholland** (2–2) | Garcia (0–1) | — | 33,790 | 10–6 |
| 17 | April 22 | Pirates | 4–2 | **Chen** (2–0) | Benson (0–3) | **Rocker** (2) | 41,389 | 11–6 |
| 18 | April 23 | Pirates | 5–3 | **Maddux** (3–0) | Cordova (1–2) | **Rocker** (3) | 29,463 | 12–6 |
| 19 | April 25 | Dodgers | 1–0 | **Glavine** (4–0) | Brown (1–1) | — | 35,046 | 13–6 |
| 20 | April 26 | Dodgers | 5–1 | **Millwood** (2–0) | Gagne (0–1) | — | 31,734 | 14–6 |
| 21 | April 27 | Dodgers | 6–3 | **Mulholland** (3–2) | Park (3–2) | **Rocker** (4) | 37,750 | 15–6 |
| 22 | April 28 | @ Padres | 7–2 | **Maddux** (4–0) | Meadows (2–2) | **Remlinger** (4) | 33,995 | 16–6 |
| 23 | April 29 | @ Padres | 7–4 (12) | **Chen** (3–0) | Palacios (0–1) | **Rocker** (5) | 49,428 | 17–6 |
| 24 | April 30 | @ Padres | 7–4 | **Glavine** (5–0) | Hitchcock (0–3) | — | 44,845 | 18–6 |

May: 17–10 (Home: 6–3; Away: 11–7)

| # | Date | Opponent | Score | Win | Loss | Save | Attendance | Record |
|---|---|---|---|---|---|---|---|---|
| 25 | May 1 | @ Dodgers | 2–1 | **Millwood** (3–0) | Gagne (0–2) | **Rocker** (6) | 28,790 | 19–6 |
| 26 | May 2 | @ Dodgers | 5–3 | **Chen** (4–0) | Adams (2–2) | **Rocker** (7) | 30,246 | 20–6 |
| 27 | May 3 | @ Dodgers | 4–6 | Perez (3–1) | **Maddux** (4–1) | Shaw (7) | 34,960 | 20–7 |
| 28 | May 5 | Phillies | 6–5 | **Seanez** (1–0) | Gomes (1–2) | — | 40,174 | 21–7 |
| 29 | May 6 | Phillies | 0–6 | Schilling (1–1) | **Millwood** (3–1) | — | 48,610 | 21–8 |
| 30 | May 7 | Phillies | 4–7 | Ashby (2–3) | **Mulholland** (3–3) | Gomes (5) | 40,613 | 21–9 |
| 31 | May 8 | @ Marlins | 2–3 | Miceli (3–1) | **Seanez** (1–1) | — | 14,024 | 21–10 |
| 32 | May 9 | @ Marlins | 10–5 | **Burkett** (1–2) | Penny (3–4) | — | 12,564 | 22–10 |
| 33 | May 10 | @ Marlins | 3–5 | Sanchez (4–1) | **Glavine** (5–1) | Alfonseca (10) | 15,249 | 22–11 |
| 34 | May 11 | @ Marlins | 4–5 | Grilli (1–0) | **Millwood** (3–2) | Alfonseca (11) | 14,587 | 22–12 |
| 35 | May 12 | @ Phillies | 8–7 | **Ligtenberg** (1–1) | Gomes (1–4) | **Rocker** (8) | 21,922 | 23–12 |
| 36 | May 13 | @ Phillies | 3–2 (10) | **Seanez** (2–1) | Aldred (1–3) | **Rocker** (9) | 20,516 | 24–12 |
| 37 | May 14 | @ Phillies | 11–2 | **Burkett** (2–2) | Byrd (1–3) | — | 22,258 | 25–12 |
| 38 | May 16 | Giants | 9–7 | **Glavine** (6–1) | Ortiz (2–5) | **Mulholland** (1) | 35,808 | 26–12 |
| 39 | May 17 | Giants | 5–4 | **Millwood** (4–2) | Rueter (2–2) | **Seanez** (1) | 33,138 | 27–12 |
| 40 | May 18 | Giants | 3–2 | **Maddux** (5–1) | Estes (2–2) | **Rocker** (10) | 42,222 | 28–12 |
| 41 | May 19 | Padres | 7–11 | Whiteside (1–0) | **Mulholland** (3–4) | Hoffman (7) | 39,423 | 28–13 |
| 42 | May 20 | Padres | 10–6 | **Burkett** (3–2) | Cunnane (1–1) | — | 49,653 | 29–13 |
| 43 | May 21 | Padres | 12–6 | **Glavine** (7–1) | Hitchcock (1–6) | — | 40,533 | 30–13 |
| 44 | May 23 | @ Brewers | 6–7 | Wright (1–0) | **Millwood** (4–3) | Wickman (5) | 15,808 | 30–14 |
| 45 | May 24 | @ Brewers | 11–2 | **Maddux** (6–1) | Haynes (5–3) | — | 18,153 | 31–14 |
| 46 | May 25 | @ Brewers | 7–3 | **Mulholland** (4–4) | D'Amico (2–2) | — | 21,527 | 32–14 |
| 47 | May 26 | @ Astros | 4–5 (10) | Henry (1–2) | **Seanez** (2–2) | — | 42,027 | 32–15 |
| 48 | May 27 | @ Astros | 6–5 | **Burkett** (4–2) | Reynolds (5–1) | **Ligtenberg** (3) | 42,632 | 33–15 |
| 49 | May 28 | @ Astros | 3–4 | Valdes (1–0) | **Seanez** (2–3) | Wagner (5) | 42,777 | 33–16 |
| 50 | May 29 | @ Cubs | 1–0 | **Maddux** (7–1) | Lieber (5–4) | — | 40,123 | 34–16 |
| 51 | May 30 | @ Cubs | 5–2 | **Mulholland** (5–4) | Quevedo (0–3) | **Remlinger** (5) | 35,511 | 35–16 |
| – | May 31 | @ Cubs | Postponed (rain); rescheduled for June 1 | | | | | |

June: 13–15 (Home: 8–7; Away: 5–8)

| # | Date | Opponent | Score | Win | Loss | Save | Attendance | Record |
|---|---|---|---|---|---|---|---|---|
| 52 | June 1 | @ Cubs | 3–5 | Tapani (3–6) | **Glavine** (7–2) | Aguilera (10) | 5,267 | 35–17 |
| 53 | June 2 | Yankees | 2–5 | Hernandez (5–4) | **Millwood** (4–4) | Rivera (13) | 48,524 | 35–18 |
| 54 | June 3 | Yankees | 11–7 | **Remlinger** (1–1) | Grimsley (1–1) | — | 48,423 | 36–18 |
| 55 | June 4 | Yankees | 6–7 | Pettitte (5–2) | **Mulholland** (5–5) | Rivera (14) | 47,756 | 36–19 |
| 56 | June 5 | Blue Jays | 3–9 | Wells (10–2) | **Burkett** (4–3) | — | 33,641 | 36–20 |
| 57 | June 6 | Blue Jays | 7–6 | **Remlinger** (2–1) | Frascatore (1–2) | — | 39,454 | 37–20 |
| 58 | June 7 | Blue Jays | 8–12 | Cubillan (1–0) | **Millwood** (4–5) | Koch (12) | 33,240 | 37–21 |
| 59 | June 9 | Red Sox | 6–4 | **Maddux** (8–1) | Fassero (6–2) | **Seanez** (2) | 48,053 | 38–21 |
| 60 | June 10 | Red Sox | 6–0 | **Mulholland** (6–5) | Schourek (2–6) | — | 49,420 | 39–21 |
| 61 | June 11 | Red Sox | 3–5 | Garces (2–0) | **Seanez** (2–4) | Lowe (14) | 47,437 | 39–22 |
| 62 | June 12 | @ Pirates | 10–8 | **Ligtenberg** (2–1) | Christiansen (1–6) | **Remlinger** (6) | 15,196 | 40–22 |
| 63 | June 13 | @ Pirates | 6–7 (10) | Silva (5–2) | Wengert (0–1) | — | 17,971 | 40–23 |
| 64 | June 14 | @ Pirates | 8–4 | **Maddux** (9–1) | Anderson (1–5) | **Ligtenberg** (4) | 16,972 | 41–23 |
| 65 | June 15 | @ Pirates | 0–2 | Benson (5–5) | **Millwood** (4–6) | — | 19,065 | 41–24 |
| 66 | June 16 | @ Phillies | 1–2 | Schilling (2–4) | **Glavine** (7–3) | Brantley (7) | 20,495 | 41–25 |
| 67 | June 17 | @ Phillies | 3–9 | Politte (1–1) | **Mulholland** (6–6) | — | 37,292 | 41–26 |
| 68 | June 18 | @ Phillies | 5–3 | **Burkett** (5–3) | Schrenk (2–2) | **Rocker** (11) | 25,359 | 42–26 |
| 69 | June 19 | @ Phillies | 2–5 | Brock (2–4) | **Remlinger** (2–2) | Brantley (8) | 22,264 | 42–27 |
| 70 | June 20 | Cubs | 11–4 | **Millwood** (5–6) | Tapani (4–7) | — | 46,618 | 43–27 |
| 71 | June 21 | Cubs | 1–8 | Wood (3–4) | **Glavine** (7–4) | — | 44,698 | 43–28 |
| 72 | June 22 | Cubs | 6–4 | **Mulholland** (7–6) | Downs (3–2) | **Remlinger** (7) | 47,893 | 44–28 |
| 73 | June 23 | Brewers | 3–2 | **Marquis** (1–0) | Weathers (3–3) | **Rocker** (12) | 41,402 | 45–28 |
| 74 | June 24 | Brewers | 1–2 | Wright (4–1) | **Maddux** (9–2) | Wickman (10) | 49,802 | 45–29 |
| 75 | June 25 | Brewers | 5–4 | **Rocker** (1–0) | Leskanic (0–2) | — | 40,268 | 46–29 |
| 76 | June 27 | @ Expos | 4–6 | Armas (3–5) | **Glavine** (7–5) | Kline (9) | 11,636 | 46–30 |
| 77 | June 28 | @ Expos | 7–4 | **Mulholland** (8–6) | Hermanson (6–5) | **Ligtenberg** (5) | 12,653 | 47–30 |
| 78 | June 29 | @ Mets | 6–4 | **Burkett** (6–3) | Reed (4–2) | **Ligtenberg** (6) | 46,998 | 48–30 |
| 79 | June 30 | @ Mets | 8–11 | Benitez (2–3) | **Mulholland** (8–7) | — | 52,831 | 48–31 |

July: 17–9 (Home: 8–5; Away: 9–4)

| # | Date | Opponent | Score | Win | Loss | Save | Attendance | Record |
|---|---|---|---|---|---|---|---|---|
| 80 | July 1 | @ Mets | 1–9 | Leiter (10–1) | **Maddux** (9–3) | — | 44,593 | 48–32 |
| 81 | July 2 | @ Mets | 10–2 | **Glavine** (8–5) | Rusch (6–6) | — | 45,261 | 49–32 |
| 82 | July 3 | Expos | 1–17 | Armas (4–5) | **Mulholland** (8–8) | — | 44,302 | 49–33 |
| 83 | July 4 | Expos | 7–3 | **Maddux** (10–3) | Hermanson (6–6) | — | 47,277 | 50–33 |
| 84 | July 5 | Expos | 5–6 | Vazquez (7–4) | **Millwood** (5–7) | Kline (10) | 34,044 | 50–34 |
| 85 | July 6 | Expos | 2–4 | Johnson (4–3) | **Burkett** (6–4) | Kline (11) | 36,377 | 50–35 |
| 86 | July 7 | @ Red Sox | 5–3 | **Glavine** (9–5) | Schourek (2–8) | **Ligtenberg** (7) | 33,686 | 51–35 |
| 87 | July 8 | @ Red Sox | 5–1 | **Mulholland** (9–8) | Martinez (6–5) | — | 33,311 | 52–35 |
| 88 | July 9 | @ Red Sox | 2–7 | Wakefield (5–5) | **Millwood** (5–8) | — | 33,018 | 52–36 |
**71st All-Star Game in Atlanta, Georgia**
| 89 | July 13 | @ Orioles | 6–3 | **Maddux** (11–3) | Mussina (6–8) | **Kamieniecki** (1) | 47,284 | 53–36 |
| 90 | July 14 | @ Orioles | 4–1 | **Ashby** (5–7) | Ponson (5–5) | — | 47,715 | 54–36 |
| 91 | July 15 | @ Orioles | 7–3 | **Glavine** (10–5) | Erickson (4–7) | — | 49,013 | 55–36 |
| 92 | July 16 | @ Devil Rays | 6–4 | **Kamieniecki** (2–3) | Mecir (7–2) | — | 41,066 | 56–36 |
| 93 | July 17 | @ Devil Rays | 6–8 | Rupe (1–4) | **Mulholland** (9–9) | Hernandez (15) | 28,538 | 56–37 |
| 94 | July 18 | @ Devil Rays | 8–2 | **Maddux** (12–3) | Rekar (3–5) | — | 31,354 | 57–37 |
| – | July 19 | @ Marlins | Postponed (rain); rescheduled for July 20 | | | | | |
| 95 | July 20 (1) | @ Marlins | 5–3 | **Glavine** (11–5) | Dempster (9–7) | **Ligtenberg** (8) | N/A | 58–37 |
| 96 | July 20 (2) | @ Marlins | 1–6 | Burnett (1–0) | **Kamieniecki** (2–4) | — | 28,978 | 58–38 |
| 97 | July 21 | Mets | 6–3 | **Burkett** (7–4) | Leiter (10–4) | **Remlinger** (8) | 49,313 | 59–38 |
| 98 | July 22 | Mets | 0–4 | Reed (5–2) | **Maddux** (12–4) | — | 48,141 | 59–39 |
| 99 | July 23 | Mets | 1–0 | **Ashby** (6–7) | Jones (4–5) | — | 46,872 | 60–39 |
| 100 | July 25 | Marlins | 6–5 | **Glavine** (12–5) | Dempster (9–8) | **Ligtenberg** (9) | 41,990 | 61–39 |
| 101 | July 26 | Marlins | 6–3 | **Millwood** (6–8) | Burnett (1–1) | **Rocker** (13) | 34,325 | 62–39 |
| 102 | July 27 | Marlins | 4–12 | Smith (1–3) | **Maddux** (12–5) | — | 37,535 | 62–40 |
| 103 | July 28 | Astros | 5–2 | **Ashby** (7–7) | Miller (1–3) | **Rocker** (14) | 47,906 | 63–40 |
| 104 | July 29 | Astros | 13–5 | **Burkett** (8–4) | Reynolds (7–8) | — | 47,889 | 64–40 |
| 105 | July 30 | Astros | 6–3 | **Glavine** (13–5) | Holt (4–12) | **Remlinger** (9) | 40,613 | 65–40 |

August: 14–15 (Home: 7–7; Away: 7–8)

| # | Date | Opponent | Score | Win | Loss | Save | Attendance | Record |
|---|---|---|---|---|---|---|---|---|
| 106 | August 1 | @ Diamondbacks | 4–2 | **Millwood** (7–8) | Swindell (2–4) | **Remlinger** (10) | 35,138 | 66–40 |
| 107 | August 2 | @ Diamondbacks | 0–2 | Schilling (8–6) | **Maddux** (12–6) | — | 40,643 | 66–41 |
| 108 | August 3 | @ Diamondbacks | 4–8 | Anderson (9–4) | **Ashby** (7–8) | — | 35,441 | 66–42 |
| 109 | August 4 | @ Cardinals | 6–4 | **Glavine** (14–5) | Benes (10–6) | **Kamieniecki** (2) | 48,901 | 67–42 |
| 110 | August 5 | @ Cardinals | 0–5 | Stephenson (12–7) | **Burkett** (8–5) | — | 47,709 | 67–43 |
| 111 | August 6 | @ Cardinals | 6–4 | **Remlinger** (3–2) | Kile (13–7) | **Ligtenberg** (10) | 47,623 | 68–43 |
| 112 | August 7 | @ Reds | 2–3 (10) | Sullivan (2–4) | **Ligtenberg** (2–2) | — | 34,990 | 68–44 |
| 113 | August 8 | @ Reds | 5–4 | **Ashby** (8–8) | Dessens (5–2) | **Remlinger** (11) | 32,381 | 69–44 |
| 114 | August 9 | @ Reds | 6–10 | Harnisch (4–6) | **Glavine** (14–6) | — | 31,098 | 69–45 |
| 115 | August 11 | Dodgers | 7–2 | **Remlinger** (4–2) | Adams (4–4) | — | 48,824 | 70–45 |
| 116 | August 12 | Dodgers | 4–1 | **Maddux** (13–6) | Valdez (2–6) | **Ligtenberg** (11) | 47,806 | 71–45 |
| 117 | August 13 | Dodgers | 2–7 | Dreifort (10–7) | **Ashby** (8–9) | — | 40,443 | 71–46 |
| 118 | August 14 | Padres | 9–2 | **Glavine** (15–6) | Witasick (3–9) | — | 31,316 | 72–46 |
| 119 | August 15 | Padres | 3–1 | **Remlinger** (5–2) | Williams (7–5) | **Rocker** (15) | 33,543 | 73–46 |
| 120 | August 16 | Padres | 4–1 | **Kamieniecki** (3–4) | Walker (6–1) | **Rocker** (16) | 31,650 | 74–46 |
| 121 | August 18 | @ Giants | 0–2 | Hernandez (12–9) | **Maddux** (13–7) | — | 40,930 | 74–47 |
| 122 | August 19 | @ Giants | 3–12 | Ortiz (9–10) | **Ashby** (8–10) | — | 40,930 | 74–48 |
| 123 | August 20 | @ Giants | 8–5 | **Glavine** (16–6) | Rueter (8–8) | — | 40,930 | 75–48 |
| 124 | August 21 | @ Rockies | 7–4 | **Millwood** (8–8) | Bohanon (7–9) | **Rocker** (17) | 43,015 | 76–48 |
| 125 | August 22 | @ Rockies | 6–7 (12) | Mayne (1–0) | **Rocker** (1–1) | — | 41,707 | 76–49 |
| 126 | August 23 | @ Rockies | 5–2 | **Maddux** (14–7) | Rose (4–7) | **Remlinger** (12) | 41,850 | 77–49 |
| 127 | August 24 | Cardinals | 5–12 | Hentgen (13–9) | **Ashby** (8–11) | — | 41,166 | 77–50 |
| 128 | August 25 | Cardinals | 7–4 | **Glavine** (17–6) | Timlin (4–4) | **Ligtenberg** (12) | 46,695 | 78–50 |
| 129 | August 26 | Cardinals | 3–6 | Stephenson (15–7) | **Millwood** (8–9) | — | 49,475 | 78–51 |
| 130 | August 27 | Cardinals | 2–7 | Kile (15–9) | **Ligtenberg** (2–3) | — | 46,574 | 78–52 |
| 131 | August 28 | Reds | 3–6 | Villone (9–7) | **Maddux** (14–8) | — | 35,048 | 78–53 |
| 132 | August 29 | Reds | 2–4 | Parris (9–14) | **Remlinger** (5–3) | Graves (23) | 34,347 | 78–54 |
| 133 | August 30 | Reds | 5–2 | **Glavine** (18–6) | Dessens (6–5) | — | 32,418 | 79–54 |
| 134 | August 31 | Reds | 3–4 | Riedling (1–0) | **Millwood** (8–10) | Graves (24) | 38,647 | 79–55 |

September/October: 16–12 (Home: 9–6; Away: 7–6)

| # | Date | Opponent | Score | Win | Loss | Save | Attendance | Record |
|---|---|---|---|---|---|---|---|---|
| 135 | September 1 | @ Astros | 2–3 | Lima (6–15) | **Burkett** (8–6) | Dotel (11) | 38,845 | 79–56 |
| 136 | September 2 | @ Astros | 8–6 | **Maddux** (15–8) | Elarton (15–5) | **Rocker** (18) | 43,189 | 80–56 |
| 137 | September 3 | @ Astros | 3–9 | Miller (4–5) | **Ashby** (8–12) | — | 43,009 | 80–57 |
| 138 | September 5 | Diamondbacks | 5–2 | **Glavine** (19–6) | Johnson (17–6) | **Rocker** (19) | 29,722 | 81–57 |
| 139 | September 6 | Diamondbacks | 7–1 | **Millwood** (9–10) | Reynoso (10–10) | — | 25,529 | 82–57 |
| 140 | September 7 | Diamondbacks | 4–0 | **Maddux** (16–8) | Schilling (10–11) | — | 30,446 | 83–57 |
| 141 | September 8 | Expos | 3–2 | **Ashby** (9–12) | Moore (1–5) | **Rocker** (20) | 35,870 | 84–57 |
| 142 | September 9 | Expos | 5–7 (12) | Santana (1–5) | **Seelbach** (0–1) | — | 47,775 | 84–58 |
| 143 | September 10 | Expos | 0–4 | Vazquez (9–7) | **Glavine** (19–7) | — | 39,068 | 84–59 |
| 144 | September 12 | Marlins | 4–5 | Sanchez (9–10) | **Millwood** (9–11) | Alfonseca (40) | 27,762 | 84–60 |
| 145 | September 13 | Marlins | 4–0 | **Maddux** (17–8) | Dempster (12–10) | — | 29,573 | 85–60 |
| 146 | September 14 | Marlins | 5–3 | **Ashby** (10–12) | Cornelius (3–9) | **Rocker** (21) | 33,298 | 86–60 |
| 147 | September 15 | @ Diamondbacks | 1–2 | Johnson (18–6) | **Glavine** (19–8) | Mantei (15) | 39,774 | 86–61 |
| 148 | September 16 | @ Diamondbacks | 12–10 | **Burkett** (9–6) | Stottlemyre (9–6) | **Rocker** (22) | 41,470 | 87–61 |
| 149 | September 17 | @ Diamondbacks | 7–1 | **Millwood** (10–11) | Schilling (10–12) | — | 38,364 | 88–61 |
| 150 | September 18 | Mets | 6–3 | **Maddux** (18–8) | Hampton (13–10) | **Rocker** (23) | 41,937 | 89–61 |
| 151 | September 19 | Mets | 12–4 | **Ashby** (11–12) | Rusch (10–11) | — | 46,584 | 90–61 |
| 152 | September 20 | Mets | 3–6 | Leiter (16–7) | **Glavine** (19–9) | Benitez (38) | 48,278 | 90–62 |
| 153 | September 22 | @ Expos | 4–6 | Armas (7–8) | **Millwood** (10–12) | Strickland (9) | 8,464 | 90–63 |
| 154 | September 23 | @ Expos | 10–0 | **Maddux** (19–8) | Lira (5–7) | — | 10,136 | 91–63 |
| 155 | September 24 | @ Expos | 14–5 | **Ashby** (12–12) | Thurman (4–8) | — | 11,350 | 92–63 |
| 156 | September 25 | @ Expos | 6–0 | **Glavine** (20–9) | Vazquez (11–8) | — | 6,931 | 93–63 |
| 157 | September 26 | @ Mets | 7–1 | **Burkett** (10–6) | Leiter (16–8) | — | 48,270 | 94–63 |
| 158 | September 27 | @ Mets | 2–6 | Reed (11–5) | **Millwood** (10–13) | — | 48,858 | 94–64 |
| 159 | September 28 | @ Mets | 2–8 | Jones (11–6) | **Maddux** (19–9) | — | 52,134 | 94–65 |
| 160 | September 29 | Rockies | 2–4 | Bohanon (12–10) | **Ashby** (12–13) | Jimenez (24) | 44,548 | 94–66 |
| 161 | September 30 | Rockies | 5–2 | **Glavine** (21–9) | Rose (7–10) | **Rocker** (24) | 48,933 | 95–66 |
| 162 | October 1 | Rockies | 5–10 | Tavarez (11–5) | **Rocker** (1–2) | — | 45,794 | 95–67 |

Legend: = Win = Loss
Bold = Braves team member

== Player stats ==
=== Batting ===
==== Starters by position ====
Note: Pos = Position; G = Games played; AB = At bats; H = Hits; Avg. = Batting average; HR = Home runs; RBI = Runs batted in

| Pos | Player | G | AB | H | Avg. | HR | RBI |
|---|---|---|---|---|---|---|---|
| C | Javy López | 134 | 481 | 138 | .287 | 24 | 89 |
| 1B | Andres Gallaraga | 141 | 494 | 149 | .302 | 28 | 100 |
| 2B | Quilvio Veras | 84 | 298 | 92 | .309 | 5 | 37 |
| SS | Rafael Furcal | 131 | 455 | 134 | .295 | 4 | 37 |
| 3B | Chipper Jones | 156 | 579 | 180 | .311 | 36 | 111 |
| LF | Reggie Sanders | 103 | 340 | 79 | .232 | 11 | 37 |
| CF | Andruw Jones | 161 | 656 | 199 | .303 | 36 | 104 |
| RF | Brian Jordan | 133 | 489 | 129 | .264 | 17 | 77 |

==== Other batters ====
Note: G = Games played; AB = At bats; H = Hits; Avg. = Batting average; HR = Home runs; RBI = Runs batted in

| Player | G | AB | H | Avg. | HR | RBI |
|---|---|---|---|---|---|---|
| Keith Lockhart | 113 | 275 | 73 | .265 | 2 | 32 |
| Bobby Bonilla | 114 | 239 | 61 | .255 | 5 | 28 |
| Wally Joyner | 119 | 224 | 63 | .281 | 5 | 32 |
| Walt Weiss | 80 | 192 | 50 | .260 | 0 | 18 |
| B.J. Surhoff | 44 | 128 | 37 | .289 | 1 | 11 |
| Trent Hubbard | 61 | 81 | 15 | .185 | 1 | 6 |
| Paul Bako | 24 | 58 | 11 | .190 | 2 | 6 |
| Fernando Lunar | 22 | 54 | 10 | .185 | 0 | 5 |
| George Lombard | 27 | 39 | 4 | .103 | 0 | 2 |
| Steve Sisco | 25 | 27 | 5 | .185 | 1 | 2 |
| Eddie Pérez | 7 | 22 | 4 | .182 | 0 | 3 |
| Mark DeRosa | 22 | 13 | 4 | .308 | 0 | 3 |
| Tim Unroe | 4 | 5 | 0 | .000 | 0 | 0 |
| Wes Helms | 6 | 5 | 1 | .200 | 0 | 0 |
| Brian Hunter | 2 | 2 | 1 | .500 | 1 | 1 |
| Pedro Swann | 4 | 2 | 0 | .000 | 0 | 0 |
| Mike Hubbard | 2 | 1 | 0 | .000 | 0 | 0 |

=== Pitching ===
==== Starting pitchers ====
Note: G = Games pitched; IP = Innings pitched; W = Wins; L = Losses; ERA = Earned run average; SO = Strikeouts

| Player | G | IP | W | L | ERA | SO |
|---|---|---|---|---|---|---|
| Greg Maddux | 35 | 249.1 | 19 | 9 | 3.00 | 190 |
| Tom Glavine | 35 | 241.0 | 21 | 9 | 3.40 | 152 |
| Kevin Millwood | 36 | 212.2 | 10 | 13 | 4.66 | 168 |
| John Burkett | 31 | 134.1 | 10 | 6 | 4.89 | 110 |
| Andy Ashby | 15 | 98.0 | 8 | 6 | 4.13 | 55 |

==== Other pitchers ====
Note: G = Games pitched; IP = Innings pitched; W = Wins; L = Losses; ERA = Earned run average; SO = Strikeouts

| Player | G | IP | W | L | ERA | SO |
|---|---|---|---|---|---|---|
| Terry Mulholland | 54 | 156.2 | 9 | 9 | 5.11 | 78 |

==== Relief pitchers ====
Note: G = Games pitched; W = Wins; L = Losses; SV = Saves; ERA = Earned run average; SO = Strikeouts

| Player | G | W | L | SV | ERA | SO |
|---|---|---|---|---|---|---|
| John Rocker | 59 | 1 | 2 | 24 | 2.89 | 77 |
| Mike Remlinger | 71 | 5 | 3 | 12 | 3.47 | 72 |
| Kerry Ligtenberg | 59 | 2 | 3 | 12 | 3.61 | 51 |
| Scott Kamieniecki | 26 | 2 | 1 | 2 | 5.47 | 17 |
| Rudy Seánez | 23 | 2 | 4 | 2 | 4.29 | 20 |
| Bruce Chen | 22 | 4 | 0 | 0 | 2.50 | 32 |
| Jason Marquis | 15 | 1 | 0 | 0 | 5.01 | 17 |
| Greg McMichael | 15 | 0 | 0 | 0 | 4.41 | 14 |
| Stan Belinda | 10 | 0 | 0 | 0 | 9.82 | 11 |
| Don Wengert | 10 | 0 | 1 | 0 | 7.20 | 7 |
| Kevin McGlinchy | 10 | 0 | 0 | 0 | 2.16 | 9 |
| Luis Rivera | 5 | 1 | 0 | 0 | 1.35 | 5 |
| Dave Stevens | 2 | 0 | 0 | 0 | 12.00 | 4 |
| Gabe Molina | 2 | 0 | 0 | 0 | 9.00 | 1 |
| Chris Seelbach | 2 | 0 | 1 | 0 | 10.80 | 1 |
| Ismael Villegas | 1 | 0 | 0 | 0 | 13.50 | 2 |

== Postseason ==
=== Game log ===
2000 Postseason Game Log
National League Division Series: 0–3

| # | Date | Opponent | Score | Win | Loss | Save | Attendance | Record |
|---|---|---|---|---|---|---|---|---|
| 1 | October 3 | @ Cardinals | 5–7 | James (1–0) | Maddux (0–1) | Veres (1) | 52,378 | 0–1 |
| 2 | October 5 | @ Cardinals | 4–10 | Kile (1–0) | Glavine (0–1) | — | 52,389 | 0–2 |
| 3 | October 7 | Cardinals | 1–7 | Reames (1–0) | Millwood (0–1) | — | 49,898 | 0–3 |

== Award winners ==
- Andruw Jones, OF, Gold Glove Award
- Chipper Jones, 3B, Silver Slugger Award
- Greg Maddux, Pitcher of the Month, September
- Greg Maddux, P, Gold Glove

2000 Major League Baseball All-Star Game

- Andrés Galarraga, 1B, starter
- Chipper Jones, 3B, starter
- Tom Glavine, P, reserve
- Andruw Jones, OF, reserve
- Greg Maddux, P, reserve

== Farm system ==
| Level | Team | League | Manager |
|---|---|---|---|
| AAA | Richmond Braves | International League | Randy Ingle |
| AA | Greenville Braves | Southern League | Paul Runge |
| A | Myrtle Beach Pelicans | Carolina League | Brian Snitker |
| A | Macon Braves | South Atlantic League | Jeff Treadway |
| A-Short Season | Jamestown Jammers | New York–Penn League | Jim Saul |
| Rookie | Danville Braves | Appalachian League | J. J. Cannon |
| Rookie | GCL Braves | Gulf Coast League | Rick Albert |

LEAGUE CHAMPIONS: Myrtle Beach
