= Rictameter =

A rictameter is a nine-line syllabic structure typically used in poetry. The lines start at two syllables, incrementing upward by two to ten in the fifth line and ending with the same two syllable word as the first line.

Because this form involves a fixed syllabic count, it naturally accompanies haiku and other fixed-syllabic poetry forms.

Created in the early 1990s by two cousins, Jason D. Wilkins and Richard W. Lunsford, Jr., for a poetry contest held as a weekly practice of their self-invented order, The Brotherhood of the Amarantos Mystery. The order was inspired by the Robin Williams movie Dead Poets Society.

The first examples of the rictameter form to be made public were submissions made by Jason Wilkins to the website www.shadowpoetry.com in 2000. These are the first two poems created by both Jason D. Wilkins and his cousin, Richard Lunsford, Jr.

Satin
As your lips are
Pressed to mine as velvet
Soft and full with rounded sweetness
Two gentle petals alive with the night
Misted in the summer beauty
Of rains that shower love
'Pon your lips of
Satin

submitted by Jason D. Wilkins

Treasure
Placed in your view
So close but out of reach
Torturous to all your senses
For they each cry aloud to possess it
Their desires forever unquenched
For the things some want most
They cannot have
Treasure

submitted by Richard W. Lunsford, Jr.
