= Lauren Richardson =

Lauren Richardson may refer to:

- Lauren Richardson, character played by Melissa Ponzio
- Lauren Richardson, contestant in Love Island (2015 TV series)
