= Chris Seelbach =

Chris Seelbach may refer to:

- Chris Seelbach (politician) (born 1979), American politician in Cincinnati
- Chris Seelbach (baseball) (born 1972), former Major League Baseball pitcher
