= The Fat Boy Chronicles =

- Directed by: Jason Winn
- Written by: Michael Buchanan; Diane Lang
- Produced by: Michael Buchanan; Jason Winn
- Starring: Christopher Rivera, Kelly Washington, Cole Carson, Chris Bert, Ron Lester
- Cinematography: Jeremy Osbern
- Release date: November 21, 2010 (Williamsburg Independent Film Festival)
- Running time: 78 minutes
- Country: United States
- Language: English

The Fat Boy Chronicles is a feature film about Jimmy Winterpock, an obese high-school student who deals with bullying and trying to lose weight. The film is based on a novel of the same name by Michael Buchanan and Diane Lang which was inspired by a true story about an obese 9th grader in Cincinnati, Ohio. Both the novel and film were released in 2010. The film became available on Netflix. The movie received mixed reviews, with users on Rotten Tomatoes giving the movie a 49% "Rotten" rating.

== Plot ==
Jimmy Winterpock always gets teased by the football team for being overweight at 188 lb (85 kg) and 5 ft 5 in (1.65 m). For a school assignment, he writes about it in his journal. Jimmy meets a girl, Sable Moore, whom Jimmy learns cuts herself. Becoming friends, they attend church together. Eventually, Jimmy begins jogging with his father, with a goal to lose 38 lb (17 kg). Jimmy's friend Paul Grove suggested it.

Paul convinces Jimmy to sneak out to a party. After Paul's father commits suicide, Paul runs away and is injured in an accident in Colorado. Jimmy tutors Robb Thurman, the captain of the high school football team. As Jimmy and Robb become friendly, Robb tells his teammates not to harass Jimmy any more.

== Characters ==
- Jimmy Winterpock (Christopher Rivera) – The main character; he is a teenaged boy who is often depressed outside of home and church. He tries to lose weight.
- Paul Grove (Chris Bert) – Jimmy's best friend a troubled teen with drug addict parents; he struggles to find meaning in his life.
- Sable Moore (Kelly Washington) – Jimmy's love interest and later girlfriend. She has mental issues and cuts herself as a coping mechanism.
- Robb Thuman (Cole Carson) – A high school quarterback. Although he was a bully, after a few tutoring sessions with Jimmy, he changes his attitude.
- Allen Winterpock (Bill Murphey) – Jimmy's father who is also somewhat overweight.
- Marianne Winterpock (Sylvia Castro Galan) – Jimmy's mother.
- Dr. Jeffords (Ron Lester) – The doctor that examined Jimmy.
- Nate Hammer (Benjamin Davis) – A teen who has bullied Jimmy since middle school.
- Mr. Grove (Robert Pralgo)
- Ms. Pope (Sarah Cooper) – Jimmy’s high school English teacher. She assigns Jimmy to write three half pages a day in his journal.
- Whitney Elliot (Erin Áine) – A cheerleader and member of the popular crowd at school. Despite pretending to be Jimmy’s friend, she is a bully and antagonist.
- Allen Zuckerman (Jacob Boyd) – Another victim of bullying at Jimmy’s school. After discovering they ride the same bus, Jimmy and Allen become friends.
