= Allelon Ruggiero =

American film and television actor

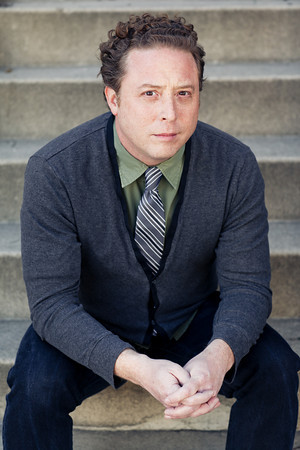
- Born: March 5, 1971 (age 55)
- Occupation: Actor
- Spouse: Lea Walker (m. 2004)
- Website: www.allelonruggiero.com

Allelon Ruggiero (born March 5, 1971) is an American actor. He is best known for his portrayal of Steven Meeks in Dead Poets Society.

== Early life ==
Ruggiero was born in Philadelphia, Pennsylvania. He attended the Philadelphia High School for the Creative and Performing Arts, and later the University of the Arts in Philadelphia.

== Acting ==
After making his debut in Peter Weir's film, Ruggiero had minor roles in movies like 12 Monkeys and The Mirror Has Two Faces. He appeared as the guest lead in "Intolerance", the 42nd episode of Law & Order (season 2) and had a lead role in the comedy horror movie, The Greenskeeper. In 2004, Ruggiero began a break of nine years from acting, until he began acting again in 2013 for an episode on The Bullsh*t Detective.

== Directing ==
In 1995, Ruggiero wrote, directed, and acted in a short film entitled "Lost", which screened at the Museum of American Art and took a third-place prize in its category at the 1997 Denver Film Festival. During his acting hiatus, Ruggiero ventured into directing and producing, making content for Bain & Company. Ruggiero and his wife, TV producer Lea Walker, opened Aeriform Arts, an aerial and circus arts training facility in Hollywood in 2011. In 2019, Ruggiero directed Cirque du Giselle, an aerial version of the classic ballet, during the Hollywood Fringe Festival.

== Filmography ==
| Year | Title | Role | Notes |
|---|---|---|---|
| 1989 | Dead Poets Society | Stephen Meeks | |
| 1990 | Green Card | | |
| 1991 | New Jack City | | |
| 1991 | Mannequin Two: On the Move | Employee #1 | |
| 1995 | 12 Monkeys | Inpatient | Uncredited |
| 1995 | Eyes Beyond Seeing | | |
| 1995 | Two Bits | | |
| 1996 | Thinner | Delivery Boy | |
| 1996 | The Mirror Has Two Faces | Lit Student | Uncredited |
| 1997 | Naked in the Cold Sun | | |
| 1998 | Fallen | Executioner | |
| 1999 | Joseph's Gift | Grant Keller | |
| 2002 | The Greenskeeper | Allen Anderson | |
| 2003 | Shakespeare's Merchant | Balthazar | |
| 2004 | The First Person | The Photographer | Short |
| 2015 | Melting Pot | Todd | Short |

== Television ==
| Year | Title | Role | Notes |
|---|---|---|---|
| 1992 | Law & Order | Carl Borland | Episode 42: "Intolerance" |
| 2010 | The Steps | Jonas | 6 episodes, on Blip.tv |
| 2013 | The Bullsh*t Detective | Leonard Roberts | 1 episode |
| 2013 | Trent & Tilly | Nikolai | 3 episodes |
| 2018 | Crazy Ex-Girlfriend | Commercial Director | 1 episode |
