= The Greenskeeper =

- Directed by: Kevin Greene; Adam Johnson; Tripp Norton
- Written by: Kevin Greene; Alex Wier
- Produced by: Kevin Greene; Adam Johnson; Tripp Norton
- Starring: Allelon Ruggiero; Christi Taylor; John Rocker; Bruce Taylor; Ron Lester; Melissa Ponzio
- Cinematography: Matthew MacCarthy
- Edited by: Tripp Norton
- Music by: Kip Winger
- Production company: Ghostman
- Release date: 2002
- Running time: 82 minutes
- Country: United States
- Language: English
- Budget: $100,000

The Greenskeeper is a 2002 slasher film starring Allelon Ruggiero. The plot centers around a mysterious killer dressed as a greenskeeper terrorizing guests at a country club birthday party.

== Plot ==
Young Allen Anderson (Allelon Ruggiero), a struggling screenwriter is under pressure from his floozy girlfriend Mary Jane (Christi Taylor), due to his mediocre lifestyle and her big dream of earning his huge inheritance (which implies why she is dating him). While celebrating his 25th birthday, Allen is continuously haunted by strange visions of a figure engulfed in flames, a recurring theme in the film. Later in the day, Christi and some of Allen's friends and co-workers coax Allen to keep the family Golf Club open so they can throw a proper birthday party for him.

Clearly unsatisfied, Allen nonetheless invites the rookie employee Elena, whom he actually likes. Meanwhile, a patron is gruesomely murdered and Allen's uncle John (Bruce Taylor) strictly orders the corrupt police officer to keep his trap shut.

That night the party is in full swing with most of the group getting either high on drugs or drinking themselves stupid. When one of the guys is left alone in the pool with his eyes covered, a strange figure in a keeper uniform jumps in and murders him. As the night progresses more people end up dead with the only remaining victims being Elena and Allen.

Elena, after escaping the "Greenskeeper's" cottage in the woods, runs into Allen who knocks the assailant with a shovel. As the Greenskeeper utters Allen's name, John appears and shoots him in the chest. Elena discovers bitemarks on the latter's wrist and it becomes clear who the real murderer is.

It turns out that the real Greenskeeper is actually Allen's father (John Rocker), long thought dead after a mysterious explosion. Instead of killing him, Allen's father was heavily mutilated and hid out in the woods never to face humanity. Knowing this, John concocted the murders of Allen's friends in order to divert attention away from him and that with Allen gone, John would become the next heir to the golf club.

As John is about to shoot Allen, the Greenskeeper intervenes and the two get into a scuffle. During the fight, Allen's father is stabbed with a sprinkler hose and John is decapitated with a propeller blade of a lawn mower by Otis, Allen's longtime mentor who survives John's murder attempt. With his dying breath, Allen's father apologises to him for the pain he caused and passes away in Elena's arms.

With the terror of the night concluded, Elena and Allen embrace each other and along with Otis, leave the murder scene as the film ends.

== Cast ==
- Allelon Ruggiero as Allen Anderson
- Bruce Taylor as John Anderson
- Ron Lester as Styles
- Steve Rickman as Chase
- Thomas Merdis as Otis Washington
- John Rocker as The Greenskeeper/George Anderson
- Melissa Ponzio as Elena Rodriguez
- Jamie Renell as Champ
- Allison Kulp as Mary Katherine
- Michael Short as Chet
- Christi Taylor as Mary Jane
- Patrick Donovan as Stu
- Stephanie Bingham as Mary Beth
- John Judy as Officer Cox
- Tim Frasier as Helmet Boy
- Larry Wachs as The Milkman
- Eric Von Haessler as Redneck

== Reception ==
The Greenskeeper received mostly mixed to negative reviews. The DVD & Video Guide by Mick Martin and Marsha Porter called the film "surprisingly entertaining" and Film Threat Magazine said it was a "worthwhile excursion" while British site Popcorn Pictures said it was "wholly unoriginal but has just enough mileage in it to see itself to the end".
