= Mark DeRosa =

American baseball player (born 1975)

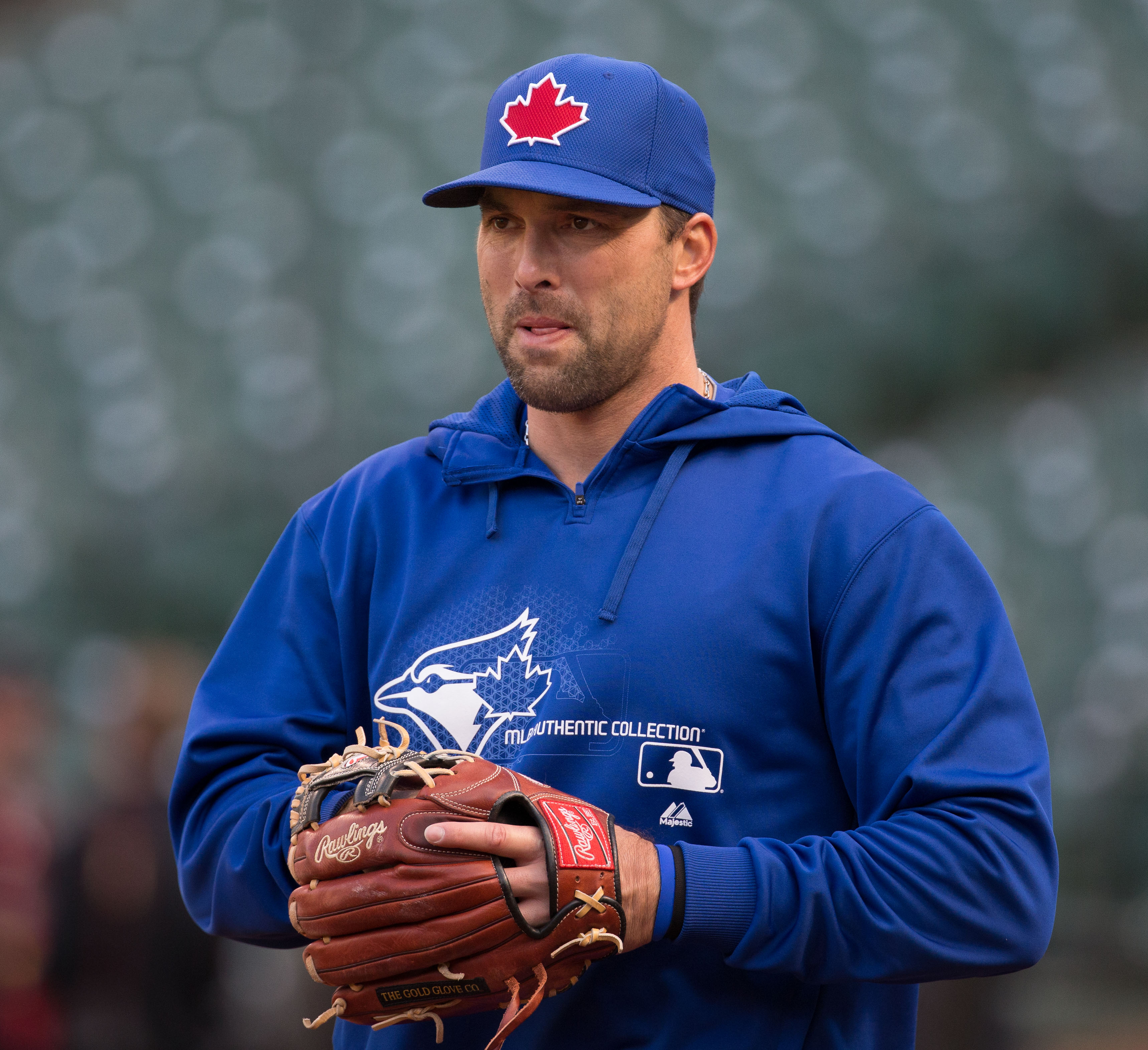
- DeRosa with the Toronto Blue Jays in 2013
- Utility player
- Born: February 26, 1975 (age 51); Passaic, New Jersey, U.S.
- Batted: Right Threw: Right

MLB debut
- September 2, 1998, for the Atlanta Braves

Last MLB appearance
- September 29, 2013, for the Toronto Blue Jays

MLB statistics
- Batting average: .268
- Home runs: 100
- Runs batted in: 494
- Stats at Baseball Reference

Teams
- Atlanta Braves (1998–2004); Texas Rangers (2005–2006); Chicago Cubs (2007–2008); Cleveland Indians (2009); St. Louis Cardinals (2009); San Francisco Giants (2010–2011); Washington Nationals (2012); Toronto Blue Jays (2013)
Medals
Men's baseball
Manager for United States
World Baseball Classic
Silver medal – second place	2023 Miami	Team
Silver medal – second place	2026 Miami	Team

Mark Thomas DeRosa (born February 26, 1975) is an American former professional baseball player who played in Major League Baseball (MLB) from 1998 to 2013. He played for the Atlanta Braves (1998–2004), Texas Rangers (2005–2006), Chicago Cubs (2007–2008), Cleveland Indians (2009), St. Louis Cardinals (2009), San Francisco Giants (2010–2011), Washington Nationals (2012), and Toronto Blue Jays (2013). DeRosa primarily played third base and second base, but he started at every position other than center field, pitcher, and catcher. He currently works for MLB Network as a studio analyst. He managed the United States national team at the 2023 and 2026 World Baseball Classics, leading both teams to silver medals.

A Carlstadt, New Jersey, native, DeRosa attended the University of Pennsylvania, where he led the football team to consecutive Ivy League championships as their quarterback in 1994 and 1995. He also played baseball for the Quakers, and he chose to sign when the Braves selected him in the seventh round (212th overall) of the 1996 MLB draft. Originally a shortstop, DeRosa debuted with the Braves briefly in 1998. He gradually got more playing time over the next few seasons, especially after transitioning to a utility player in 2001. In 2004, the Braves tried using him as their starting third baseman, but he was benched in June after struggling. Not offered a contract after the season, he signed with the Rangers. After playing just 66 games with them in 2005, he became an everyday player in 2006, batting .296 and setting career highs in several offensive categories.

Prior to the 2007 season, DeRosa signed a three-year contract with the Cubs. He set a career high with 149 games played in 2007, then equaled that total in 2008, hitting over 20 home runs (21) for the first time in his career. DeRosa was traded to the Indians in 2009, then to the Cardinals in midseason. He hit a career-high 23 home runs but injured his left wrist during the year. Offseason surgery was unsuccessful, and left wrist issues severely limited his playing time with the Giants in 2010 and 2011. DeRosa appeared in 48 games with the Nationals in 2012, then hit his 100th career home run with the Blue Jays in 2013 before retiring after the season.

== High school and college ==
DeRosa was born on February 26, 1975, in Passaic, New Jersey. His parents, father Jack and mother Mickey, were descended from Italian immigrants. Jack played college baseball as a pitcher for the Fairleigh Dickinson Knights, for whom he once threw a no hitter. Growing up in Carlstadt, New Jersey. Mark regularly watched the New York Yankees on television. His favorite player was Don Mattingly. His early playing experience came with Carlstadt's Little League team, which was sponsored by General Tire and coached by his father. He attended Bergen Catholic High School in Oradell, New Jersey, where he earned all-state honors in baseball and in football.

Offered football scholarships to the College of William & Mary as well as Rutgers University, DeRosa instead attended the University of Pennsylvania (Penn), preferring its academic reputation and the opportunity to play baseball as well. After redshirting as a freshman, he became the starting quarterback for the Quakers in 1994, leading them to an undefeated season and an Ivy League championship. He led them to another Ivy League championship in 1995. Passing for 3,895 yards and 25 touchdowns during his career, he became one of the top quarterbacks in school history.

Meanwhile, DeRosa played shortstop on the baseball team. In 1995, he played collegiate summer baseball in the Cape Cod Baseball League for the Bourne Braves. Originally expected to be a reserve, he became the team's starting third baseman when Troy Glaus departed to play for a national team. Batting over .300, he was selected to the league's All-Star team. At Penn, DeRosa was a member of the Sigma Chi fraternity.

Drafted by the Atlanta Braves in the seventh round (212th overall) of the 1996 Major League Baseball (MLB) draft, DeRosa chose to forego participating in college sports as a senior to instead pursue a professional baseball career. However, he continued to take classes in management and marketing, graduating from Penn's Wharton School in 1997.

== MLB career ==
=== Atlanta Braves (1998–2004) ===
==== Early career (1998–2001) ====
DeRosa made his professional debut in 1996 with the Eugene Emeralds of the Class A short season Northwest League. Progressing through Atlanta's minor league system, he joined the Braves for the first time as a September callup in 1998. He made his MLB debut on September 2, pinch-hitting for Greg Maddux and striking out against Randy Johnson in a 4–1 loss to the Houston Astros. On September 20, he had his first MLB hit, a pinch-hit single against Vladimir Núñez in a 10–0 win over the Arizona Diamondbacks. He appeared in five games for the Braves in 1998, serving as a shortstop, pinch hitter, and pinch runner.

In 1999, DeRosa spent most of the season as the starting shortstop for the Class AAA Richmond Braves of the International League. From June 9 through July 1, he served as a pinch hitter for Atlanta, going hitless in eight at bats while Walt Weiss was on the disabled list (DL). He was called up again on May 5, 2000, when Weiss was again placed on the DL. On May 14, he recorded his only three RBI of the season with a pinch-hit, bases-loaded double against Trever Miller in an 11–2 win over the Philadelphia Phillies. After appearing in five games, he was sent back to Richmond on May 21 when Weiss returned from the DL. He was with Atlanta again from June 13 through 29 while Rafael Furcal was on the DL, then was called up for the remainder of the season in September. In 22 games (13 at bats) for Atlanta in 2000, he batted .308 with nine runs scored and four hits.

After starting 2001 with Richmond, DeRosa was recalled on June 1, replacing pitcher Chris Seelbach on Atlanta's roster. He filled in for Furcal for 10 games, batting .300 while Atlanta's starting shortstop recovered from a minor injury. Then, he took over the starting role again on July 6 after Furcal suffered a season-ending shoulder injury. On July 21, he hit his first major league home run, a 10th-inning walkoff one against Graeme Lloyd that gave the Braves a 2–1 victory over the Montreal Expos. DeRosa hit well, batting .342 with 14 RBIs, but defensively he committed five errors. Wanting a better defender with more experience, the Braves acquired Rey Sánchez to be their starting shortstop at the July 31 trade deadline. However, DeRosa started a few more games at shortstop that August when Sánchez was recovering from a left hamstring injury. In 66 games (164 at bats), DeRosa batted .287 with 47 hits, three home runs, and 24 RBI.

DeRosa was part of a playoff roster for the first time as the Braves won the National League (NL) East division. He had a single against Mike Williams Game 1 of the NL Division Series (NLDS), his only appearance of the series as the Braves swept the Astros in three games. In four games (four at bats) in the NL Championship Series (NLCS), he was hitless as the Braves were defeated by Arizona in five games.

==== Utility player (2002–2004) ====
In 2002, DeRosa began the year as a backup player for the Braves. He had started five games in a row at shortstop for the Braves from May 13 through 17 when, in the last of those, he tore a tendon sheath in his right ankle. The injury required surgery and kept him out until July 17. Upon his return, he split time with Keith Lockhart at second base, though he also saw occasional playing time at shortstop and in left field and right field. In 72 games (212 at bats), he batted .297 with 63 hits, five home runs, and 23 RBI. He returned to the playoffs as the Braves again won the NL East. Starting at second base in Game 2 of the NLDS against the San Francisco Giants, he had two hits and two RBI in a 7–3 victory. His pinch-hit RBI single against Aaron Fultz in Game 5 provided the only Atlanta run in a 3–1 defeat that eliminated the Braves from the playoffs.

Healthy all year in 2003, DeRosa again played a number of positions: every infield spot, as well as left field and designated hitter. Of his six home runs, four came in back-to-back games: May 28 and 30 against the Cincinnati Reds and New York Mets, and September 8 and 9 against Philadelphia. On July 17, he had a walkoff bases-loaded single in the ninth inning against John Franco, giving Atlanta a 3–2 win over the Mets. In the September 8 game, he started the scoring for the Braves with a two-run home run in the first inning, then scored the go-ahead run in the fifth inning of a 6–4 win over the Phillies. In 103 games (266 at bats), he batted .263 with 70 hits, six home runs, and 22 RBI.

DeRosa made the playoffs for the third year in a row as the Braves again won the NL East championship. Starting at second base in Game 2 of the NLDS in place of Marcus Giles, who was recovering from a left leg bruise, DeRosa had an eighth-inning, two-RBI double against Dave Veres, driving in the go-ahead runs in a 5–3 victory over the Chicago Cubs. He pinch hit in three other games in the series, but the Cubs defeated the Braves in five games.

When Vinny Castilla signed with the Colorado Rockies after the 2003 season, the Braves decided to make DeRosa the starting third baseman in 2004, despite him batting just .231 with no extra-base hits in spring training. On May 2, he committed four errors, tying a team record amidst a 13–4 loss to the Rockies. DeRosa said later that the poor defensive performance distracted him from his hitting for about a week. His batting average was a mere .178 in May. On June 15, DeRosa lost his starting job, as Chipper Jones moved from left field to third base, his position from 1995 through 2001. "It was terrible," DeRosa said of his performance. Watching videotapes of himself and adjusting his approach to hitting, he performed better as a backup, but he remained a reserve player for the rest of the season. His season came to an end on September 25, when he tore his right anterior cruciate ligament (ACL). In 118 games (309 at bats), he batted .239 with 74 hits, three home runs, and 31 RBI. After the season, the Braves declined to offer DeRosa a contract for 2005, making him a free agent.

=== Texas Rangers (2005–2006) ===
On January 19, 2005, the Texas Rangers signed DeRosa to a contract, but it was only a minor league one, as the Rangers had some concerns about his health. Making it through the spring, he had his contract purchased before the start of the season, as the Rangers wanted an experienced utility infielder on their roster. The last member of the Opening Day roster to appear in a game, not making his Ranger debut until the 11th game of the season, DeRosa played only six games a month in April, May, and July, though he appeared in 12 games in June. In August and September, he saw more action in right field, as Richard Hidalgo was battling a left wrist injury. In 66 games (148 at bats), he batted .243 with 36 hits and 20 RBI. Despite appearing in his fewest games since 2001, his eight home runs represented a new career high. Still under team control at the end of the year, he avoided arbitration on December 12 by agreeing to a one-year, $675,000 contract.

After playing only two of the Rangers' first 11 games in 2006, DeRosa was on the disabled list from April 15 to 30 with a sprained left foot. With starting second baseman Ian Kinsler injured and fill-in D'Angelo Jiménez batting .208, DeRosa took over the position upon his return. He responded to the increased playing time by hitting .343, leading the Rangers in hitting in the first half of the season. On May 3, he hit a 12th-inning walkoff home run against John Halama, giving the Rangers a 2–1 victory over the Baltimore Orioles. "He means a lot to our team," said manager Buck Showalter. Once Kinsler became healthy, DeRosa returned to being a utility player, but he remained a regular in Texas's lineup, even though his position changed frequently. On August 4, DeRosa hit his first career grand slam, coming against John Lackey in a 7–3 victory over the Los Angeles Angels of Anaheim. Though his average fell to .296 by season's end, he was still one of Texas's best players in 2006. He set career highs with 136 games played, 40 doubles, 13 home runs, and 74 RBI. After the season, he became a free agent.

=== Chicago Cubs (2007–2008) ===
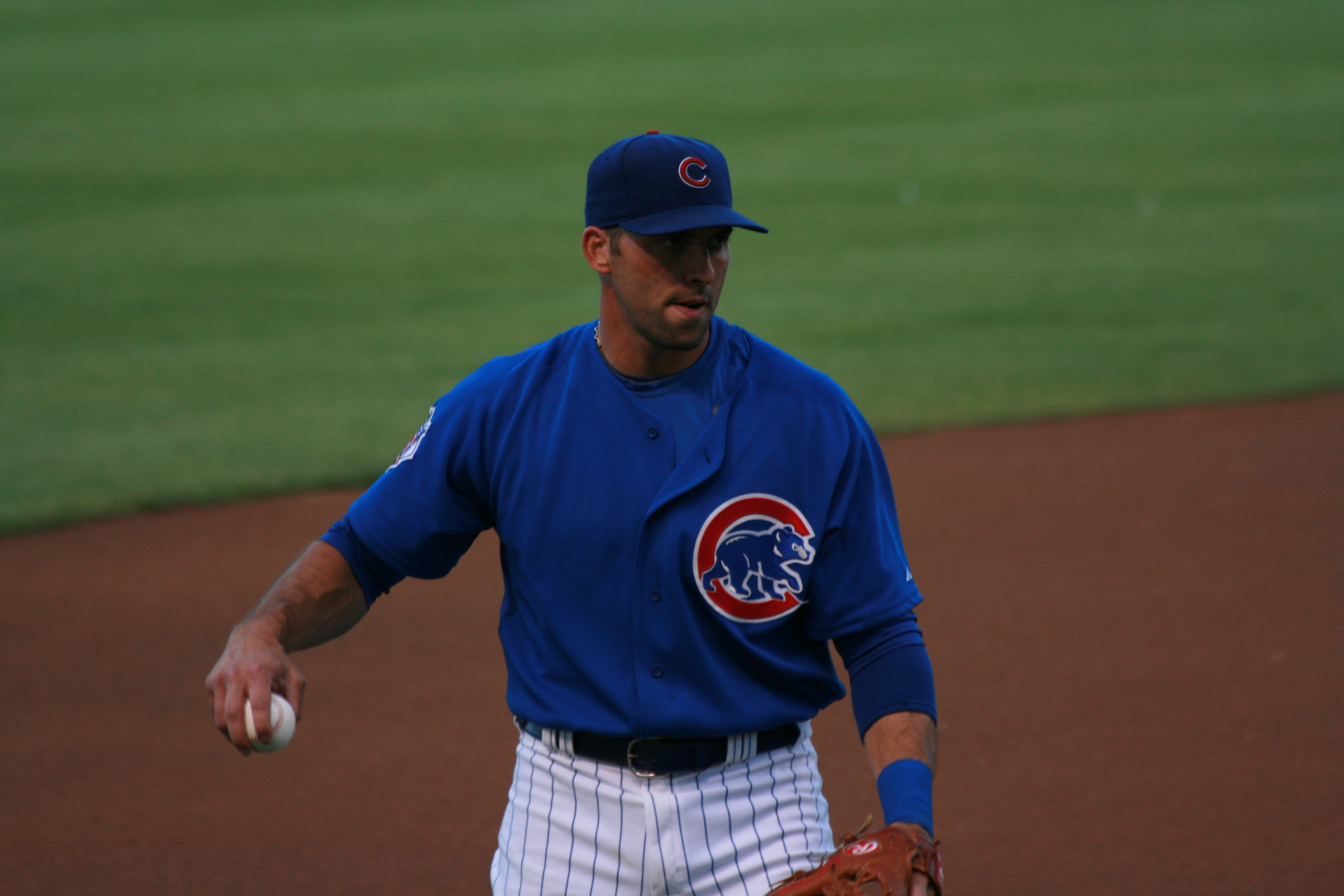
DeRosa warms up before a game on July 9, 2008

On November 14, 2006, he signed a three-year, $13 million contract with the Chicago Cubs. DeRosa was one of several acquisitions by the Cubs in their off-season spending spree. Though the Rangers had been interested in retaining him, Chicago offered DeRosa the chance to start regularly at second base, an option that he preferred. Despite this, he again played multiple positions, though he was in the lineup regularly and second base was his most frequent position. On June 3, he hit a grand slam against Lance Cormier to open the scoring in a 10–1 victory over the Braves. Against the Reds on August 16 and September 17, he had a career-high five hits. In a career-high 149 games, DeRosa batted .293 with 147 hits, 10 home runs, and 72 RBI.

Winners of the NL Central, the Cubs faced the Diamondbacks in the NLDS. Playing second base, DeRosa batted .333 with two runs scored in the series. However, the Cubs were swept by the Diamondbacks in three games.

On February 23, 2008, DeRosa was hospitalized with breathing difficulties and a rapid heartbeat. On February 28, he had a successful catheter ablation at Northwestern Memorial Hospital to correct an irregular heartbeat, a problem which had plagued him since high school. His heart procedure earned him the nickname of "the Pulse", which also became the name of his blog on the Cubs' website. On June 30, he hit a two-run home run against Barry Zito and a grand slam against Billy Sadler as the Cubs defeated the Giants 9–2. After having three RBI against the Astros on August 4, he hit a grand slam and recorded five RBI against them on August 5 in an 11–4 victory. He hit home runs in four consecutive games from August 20 through 23, becoming the first Cub to do so since Fred McGriff in 2001. In 2008, DeRosa primarily played second base, but he also filled in at third base, left field, and right field when the Cubs starters at those positions were hurt. He was the only MLB player with at least 20 appearances at four positions in 2008. Manager Lou Piniella said, "The amazing part about it is he’s very adroit defensively at every position he plays". Playing 149 games for the second year in a row, he batted .285 with 143 hits, setting career highs in runs with 103, home runs with 21, and RBI with 87. Paul Hoynes of The Plain Dealer called it his finest season in a January 15, 2009, article.

For the second year in a row, the Cubs won the NL Central. DeRosa's two-run home run against Derek Lowe in Game 1 of the NLDS opened the scoring but wound up providing the only Cubs runs in a 7–2 loss to the Los Angeles Dodgers. He had two hits and two RBI in Game 2 but also committed an error that contributed to a five-run second inning by the Dodgers as they defeated Chicago 10–3. DeRosa hit .333 in the series, but the Cubs were swept by Los Angeles in three games, a loss that DeRosa found more disappointing than the previous year's.

=== Cleveland Indians (2009) ===
On December 31, 2008, DeRosa was traded to the Cleveland Indians for minor league pitchers Jeff Stevens, Chris Archer, and John Gaub. Though third base would be his primary position for the Indians, he also spent time at first base and in the outfield. On April 18, he had six RBI in a 22–4 victory over the Yankees. From June 14 through June 16, he hit home runs in three consecutive games. He received a standing ovation from Cubs fans when he returned to Wrigley Field on June 19, even though he was now with a different team. On June 27, DeRosa was traded to the Cardinals for relief pitchers Chris Perez and Jess Todd. In 71 games (278 at bats), he was batting .270 with 75 hits, 13 home runs, and 50 RBI.

=== St. Louis Cardinals (2009) ===
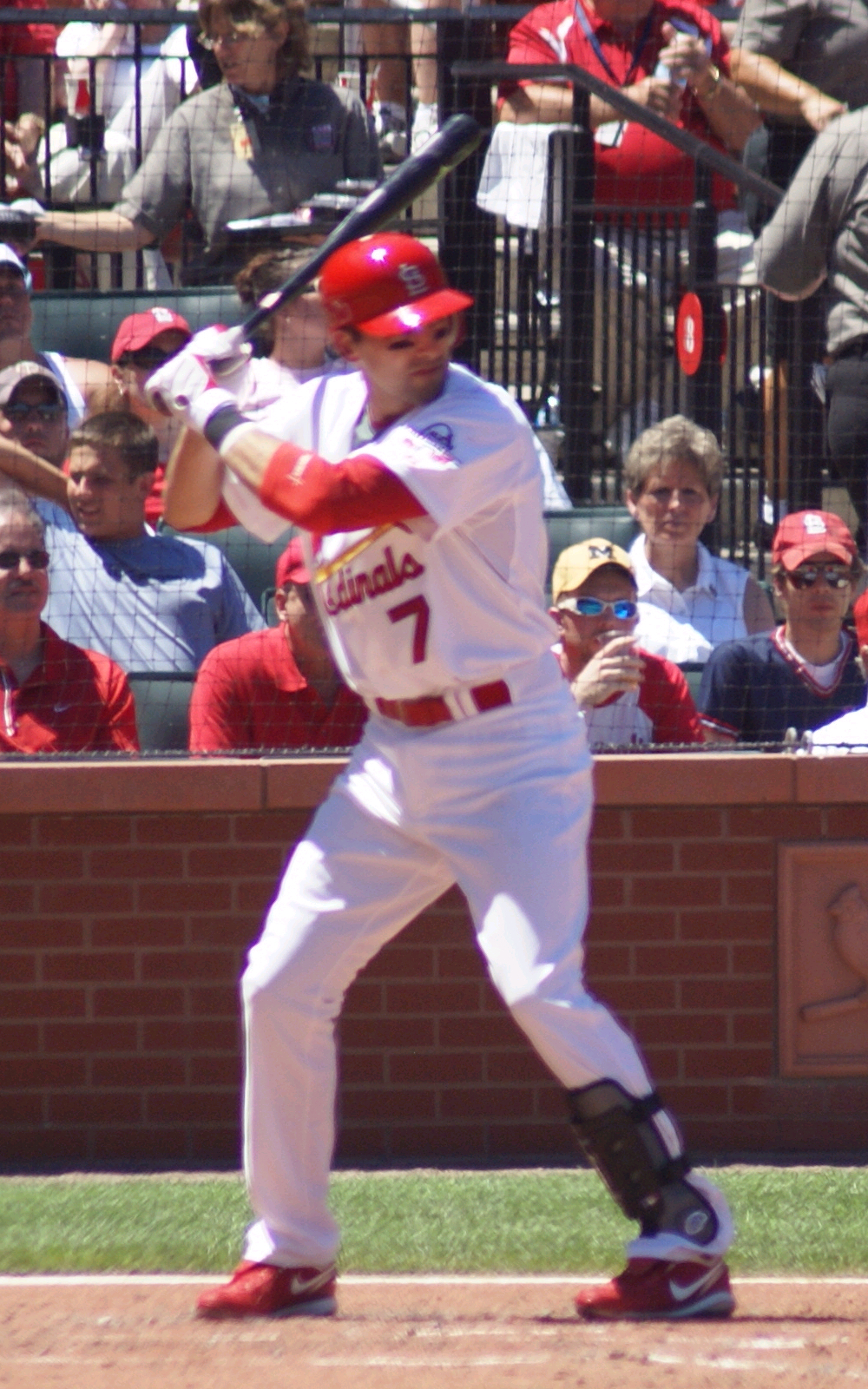
DeRosa batting for the St. Louis Cardinals in 2009

The Cardinals hoped that the addition of DeRosa would improve their offense. Soon after his acquisition, however, he was placed on the disabled list with a left wrist sprain, an injury that kept him out from July 1 through July 17. From July 26 through 28, he hit home runs in three straight games for the second time that season. On August 4, he was hit by a pitch with the bases loaded in the 10th inning of a game against the Mets, forcing in the winning run in a 12–7 victory over New York. In 68 games (237 at bats), he batted .228 with 54 hits, 10 home runs, and 28 RBI. Defensively, he committed no errors as a Cardinal. Playing 139 games combined between Cleveland and St. Louis, he batted .250 with 129 hits, a career-high 23 home runs, and 78 RBI.

The Cardinals won the NL Central and faced the Dodgers in the NLDS. In Game 1, DeRosa had three hits, including an RBI double, but the Cardinals lost 5–3. He had two hits in Game 2 and scored a run that put the Cardinals ahead in seventh, but they ultimately lost 3–2 following an error by Matt Holliday. For the second year in a row, DeRosa's team was swept by the Dodgers in the NLDS. DeRosa, who became a free agent at the end of the year, used the offseason to undergo surgery that sought to repair a torn tendon sheath in his left wrist.

=== San Francisco Giants (2010–11) ===
On December 29, 2009, DeRosa signed a two-year, $12 million contract with the Giants. At the beginning of the 2010 season, DeRosa went into a prolonged slump. He batted only .194 in his first 26 games, with just four extra base hits and 10 RBI. Experiencing numbness in the fingers of his left hand, he underwent a medical examination on May 11 and found that the wrist surgery in 2009 had been a "failure". He rested it a few days to see if it would improve but was placed on the disabled list on May 17, having not played since May 8. On July 1, he underwent season-ending surgery, a procedure that again sought to repair his tendon sheath, as well as releasing pressure on his carpal tunnel. The Giants went on to win the World Series that year, their first title since 1954.

Though DeRosa suffered from mild tendinitis in his left wrist during spring training, he began the 2011 season on the Giants' roster, though just as a reserve player. He was on the disabled list from April 28 to May 10 with wrist soreness. On May 18, 2011, he completely tore the injured tendon on a checked swing and went on the disabled list again. "Given his history, you have to consider that the injury might be career-ending", speculated reporter Andrew Baggarly. DeRosa instead reworked his swing to become more of a singles hitter and returned to the Giants on August 4. He was used mostly as a pinch hitter for the remainder of the season. In 47 games (86 at bats), he batted .279 with 24 hits, no home runs, and 12 RBI. After the season, he became a free agent.

=== Washington Nationals (2012) ===
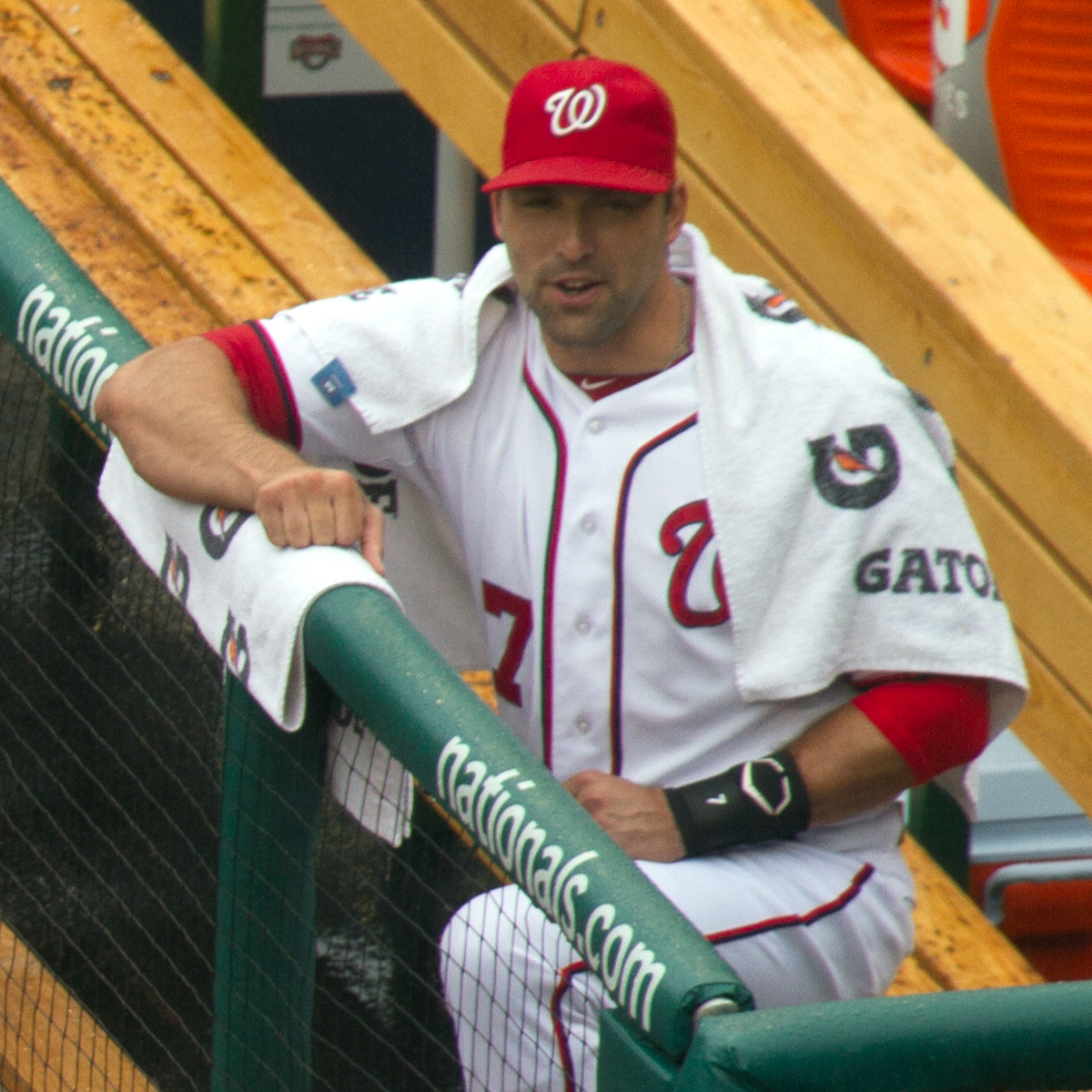
DeRosa on the Nationals' bench

On December 22, 2011, DeRosa signed a one-year contract with the Washington Nationals. Now 37 years old, he started at several positions for the Nationals in April 2012 but batted .081 in 13 games. On April 29, DeRosa was placed on the disabled list with a left oblique strain, an injury that kept him inactive until June 25. From then on, most of his appearances throughout the season were as a pinch hitter. He went on the disabled list again from August 5 to September 1 with a left abdominal injury. Despite DeRosa's limited playing time, he became an important mentor for his Nationals teammates, many of whom were much younger, including former first overall draft picks Bryce Harper and Stephen Strasburg. In 48 games (85 at bats), he batted .188 with 16 hits, no home runs, and six RBI.

Though the Nationals won the NL East, DeRosa was left off their playoff roster. However, he travelled with the team during the postseason, even reading his teammates the "Man in the Arena" portion of a Theodore Roosevelt speech to inspire them before Game 4 of the NLDS. The Nationals were eliminated by the Cardinals in five games. After the season, DeRosa became a free agent.

=== Toronto Blue Jays (2013) ===
On January 22, 2013, DeRosa signed a one-year deal worth $775,000 with the Toronto Blue Jays, with a $750,000 club option for the 2014 season. Against the Astros on July 27, DeRosa hit his 100th career home run, a solo shot to lead off the second inning against Dallas Keuchel in an 8–6 loss. In August, DeRosa was placed on revocable waivers and claimed by an unnamed team on August 7, but no trade occurred, and he remained with Toronto. During the season, DeRosa was used mostly as a pinch hitter, but he also started some games at third base, second base, first base, and designated hitter. In 88 games, DeRosa hit .235 with seven home runs and 36 RBI, including hitting .286 with one home run, eight RBI, and seven walks as a pinch hitter. The Blue Jays exercised their option on DeRosa in late October, but on November 12, DeRosa informed the team that he would retire after 16 years in MLB.

== International career ==
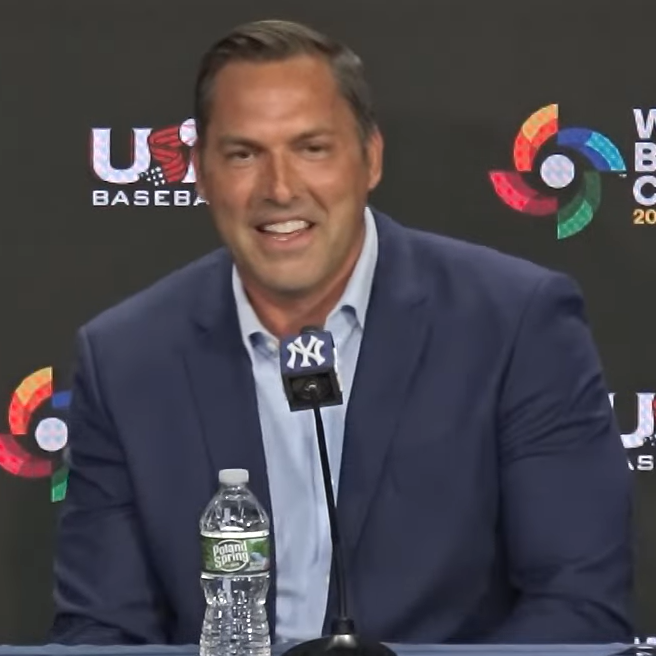
DeRosa during a 2025 press conference on behalf of the United States national baseball team ahead of the 2026 World Baseball Classic

Prior to the 2009 season, he represented the United States in the World Baseball Classic. He batted .316 and led the team with nine RBI before Japan eliminated them in the semifinals.

DeRosa was named Team USA manager for the 2023 World Baseball Classic and 2026 World Baseball Classic. Though he led the team to the finals in both years, he faced criticism in 2026 for misunderstanding the tournament format.

== Career statistics ==
DeRosa spent parts of 16 seasons in the major leagues. In 1,241 games (3,633 at bats), he batted .268 with 538 runs scored, 975 hits, 196 doubles, 12 triples, 100 home runs, and 494 RBI. Primarily a shortstop early in his career, he became a versatile utility man, ultimately making 363 appearances at third base, 343 appearances at second base, 167 appearances in right field, 120 appearances at shortstop, 90 appearances in left field, and 53 appearances at first base. (Note: These totals include appearances where DeRosa changed positions mid-game.)

== Personal life and post-playing career ==
DeRosa married former model Heidi Miller in 2002. Their daughter, Gabriella Faith, was born prematurely by two and a half months on July 28, 2003, after Heidi had spent 10 weeks in the hospital. Though Gabriella was hospitalized with tubes inserted for several weeks, she ultimately progressed to normal health. They also have a son named Brooks. He is good friends with Jim Finn, his football teammate in high school and college. Bon Jovi is one of his favorite bands.

After retiring, DeRosa accepted a position as a studio analyst with the MLB Network. He was the broadcast announcer for the video game franchise MLB: The Show since replacing Harold Reynolds in MLB The Show 18 until MLB The Show 21.
