= The Karate Dog =

2004 US television film by Bob Clark

- DVD cover
- Written by: Steven Paul; Gregory Poppen
- Directed by: Bob Clark
- Starring: Jon Voight; Simon Rex; Jaime Pressly; Thomas Kretschmann; Ron Lester; Chevy Chase
- Country of origin: United States
- Original language: English

Production
- Producer: Frank Hübner
- Cinematography: Brian Pearson
- Editor: Lenka Svab
- Running time: 84 minutes

Original release
- Network: ABC Family
- Release: May 5, 2004

The Karate Dog (simply Karate Dog on home video) is a 2004 American made-for-television crime comedy film directed by Bob Clark and produced by Frank Hübner. It stars Chevy Chase (as the voice of Cho Cho), Simon Rex, Jon Voight, and Jaime Pressly. Nicollette Sheridan and Pat Morita also make appearances.

== Plot ==
A talking dog named Cho Cho teams up with a police detective named Peter Fowler to solve the murder of his owner Chin Li.

== Cast ==
- Chevy Chase as Cho-Cho (voice). He teams up with Peter to solve the killing of Chin Li, his old owner.
- Jon Voight as Hamilton Cage, the primary antagonist.
- Simon Rex as Det. Peter Fowler. He goes with Cho Cho to find out who killed Chin Li.
- Jaime Pressly as Ashley Wilkenson. She is a police officer who wants to be a detective, and she and Peter are attracted to each other.
- Pat Morita as Chin Li
- Thomas Kretschmann as Gerber
- Nicollette Sheridan as White Cat (voice)
- Lori Petty as COLAR (voice)
- Ron Lester as Edward Cage
- Garry Chalk as Brunelli
- Dagmar Midcap as TV Reporter

== Production ==
=== Filming ===
The Karate Dog was filmed in Los Angeles, California (in the United States) and in Vancouver, British Columbia (in Canada).

== Release ==
The Karate Dog originally aired on ABC Family on Monday, May 29, 2006 at 7:00 PM Eastern / 6:00 PM Central.

== Reception ==
Reviews were negative.
