= Ron Lester =

American actor (1970–2016)

- Lester in 2003
- Born: August 4, 1970; Kennesaw, Georgia, U.S.
- Died: June 17, 2016 (aged 45); Dallas, Texas, U.S.
- Occupation: Actor
- Years active: 1994–2015

Ron Lester (August 4, 1970 – June 17, 2016) was an American actor. He was best known for his roles in the films Varsity Blues, Not Another Teen Movie, Good Burger, and the television series Popular.

== Career ==
Lester's first acting role came when he went to Atlanta, Georgia, to appear as an extra in a commercial, which turned into a feature part. He appeared in the music video for "Kick a Little" by the country music band Little Texas in 1994.

Lester moved to Los Angeles and began doing stand-up comedy in comedy clubs. His first film role was in the movie Good Burger in 1997. In 1999, Lester played the role of Billy Bob in the film Varsity Blues, which would become the role he is most known for. That year he also had recurring roles on two TV drama comedies, Freaks and Geeks and Popular. He also appeared in Not Another Teen Movie, portraying a character that was a parody of his role in Varsity Blues.

== Personal life ==
Obese since childhood, at his heaviest Lester weighed 508 pounds (230 kg). In 2000, Lester underwent a gastric bypass surgery procedure called Roux-en-Y gastric bypass with a duodenal switch. During the procedure Lester flatlined. After the gastric bypass, he had 17 plastic surgeries to remove excess skin.

In September 2015, Lester was hospitalized due to issues with his liver and kidneys. In June 2016, he was reported to be in critical condition and in hospice care. Lester died June 17, 2016, of liver and kidney failure shortly after his family requested that he be taken off life support. He was 45 years old.

== Filmography ==
=== Film ===
Year	Title	Role	Notes
1997	Good Burger	Spatch	Film debut
1999	Varsity Blues	Billy Bob	
1999	Dill Scallion	Earl Langston	
2001	Not Another Teen Movie	Reggie Ray	Spoof of his role as "Billy Bob" in Varsity Blues
2002	The Greenskeeper	Styles	
2010	The Fat Boy Chronicles	Dr. Jeffords	Also co-Executive Producer
2015	Racing Legacy	Roger Hardwick	Also Writer, Director and Executive Producer

=== Short films ===
Year	Title	Role	Notes
2001	Drum Solo		
2013	I Think My Mom's Trying to Kill Me	Son	Also Associate Producer

=== Television ===
Year	Title	Role	Notes
1998	All That	The Brute	Episode: "The Lox"
1999	Cousin Skeeter	Kung Fu Dermatologist	Episode: "Kung Fu Dermatologist"
1999–2000	Freaks and Geeks	Seidleman	Episodes: "Pilot", "Looks and Books", and "Noshing and Moshing"
1999–2001	Popular	Michael 'Sugar Daddy' Bernardino	43 episodes
2001	Sabrina the Teenage Witch	Wally	Episodes: "Really Big Season Opener" (uncredited) and "Humble Pie"
2004	The Karate Dog	Edward Cage	TV movie
2005	CSI: NY	Officer Murphy	Episode: "Dancing with the Fishes"

=== Music videos ===
Year	Title	Performer(s)	Notes
1994	"Kick a Little"	Little Texas	Directed by Jon Small
