= Joseph's Gift =

- Directed by: Philippe Mora
- Written by: Patricia Monville
- Produced by: Jed Nolan; George Peirson
- Starring: Freddy Rodriguez; Brion James; Robert Townsend; John Saxon
- Cinematography: Carlos González
- Edited by: John Rosenberg
- Music by: Joseph Bishara
- Release date: 1998
- Country: United States
- Language: English

Joseph's Gift is a 1998 American drama film. It is a modern-day retelling of the biblical story of Joseph, son of Jacob.

== Plot ==
The Keller family are the owners of a successful garment business based in Los Angeles, California. The story mainly revolves around Jacob Keller's (John Saxon) youngest son Joseph (Freddy Rodriguez). Because Jacob treats Joseph as if he is his favorite son, Joseph's brothers Ashton, Simon, and Robert plot to eliminate Joseph. They accomplish this by going on a business trip with Joseph, only to have him kidnapped and taken to a sweat shop run by sadist Frank Childress (Brion James).

After trying to escape from the sweat shop, Joseph is beaten up by Frank's right-hand man Thompsonn (Martin Kove) and put in a small prison-like cell. However, Joseph is given a chance by Frank to work in his office. Joseph's business savvy helps Frank's business, and soon Frank introduces Joseph to his wife Clara (Caroline Ambrose). Clara attempts to come on to Joseph, but Joseph rejects her advances. Enraged, Clara false claims that Joseph is coming on to her. Frank manages to overhear Clara's claims, and he has Joseph shipped off to an insane asylum.

While in the asylum, Joseph becomes acquainted with other inmates, notably Parker (John Dennis Johnston). The two strike up an instant friendship. Eventually, Joseph is released from the asylum and promises to Parker that he will get him out one day.

After leaving the asylum, Joseph gets a job at a bank and manages to get a very prestigious position in a short matter of time. Not forgetting his old friend, Joseph manages to get Parker a respectable job in the bank. Around this time, his long-lost family is in need of a bank loan in order to keep their garment business alive. Jacob's three eldest sons go to the bank and attempt to get a loan. Unbeknownst to them, they are to be in the same room with their long-lost brother Joseph. When Joseph asks what their name is, they tell him their name is Keller and he realizes that they are his long-lost family, but he does not reveal this to them. He tells them that the deal will not be considered unless their father Jacob came there in person.

A few weeks later, the three Keller boys come back to the bank, this time accompanied by Jacob. However, Joseph still does not reveal who he is.

Finally, Joseph comes to the Keller home to finalize the deal during a family dinner. Before the deal can be finalized, Joseph reveals to Jacob that he is his long-lost son Joseph Keller. After a tear-filled reunion, the entire Keller family rejoices in the fact that their family is once again complete.

== Cast ==
- Freddy Rodríguez as Joseph Keller
- Brion James as Frank Childress
- Robert Townsend as James Saunders
- John Saxon as Jacob Keller
- Pamela Bellwood as Rachel Keller
- Martin Kove as Thompsonn
- Angus Macfadyen as Carl
- Ben Bottoms as Ashton Keller
- Joseph Bottoms as Simon Keller
- Sam Bottoms as Robert Keller
- John Dennis Johnston as Parker (credited as J.D. Johnston)
- David Arrow as Justin Keller
- Caroline Ambrose as Clara Childress
- Marcel Marceau as The Snake
- Allelon Ruggiero as Grant Keller
