= Nancy H. Kleinbaum =

American writer and journalist (1948–2024)

- Born: Nancy Horowitz Kleinbaum; August 30, 1948; Elizabeth, New Jersey, US
- Died: October 24, 2024 (aged 76)
- Occupations: Writer, journalist
- Writing career
- Genres: Children's literature, Fantasy
- Notable work: Dead Poets Society

Nancy H. Kleinbaum (August 30, 1948 – October 24, 2024) was an American writer and journalist. She was the author of the novel Dead Poets Society, which is based on the movie of the same name. She resided in Mount Kisco, New York.

Kleinbaum was Jewish. She died on October 24, 2024, at the age of 76.

== Bibliography ==
- D.A.R.Y.L. (1985, based on a script by David Ambrose, Allan Scott and Jeffrey Ellis)
- Growing Pains (1987)
- Dead Poets Society (1989, based on a script by Tom Schulman)
- Cop and a Half (1993, based on a script by Arne Olsen)
- Ghost Story (1995, based on a script by Kermit Frazier)
- The Magnificent Seven. The Authorized Story of American Gold (1996)
- Dr. Dolittle (1998, by Hugh Lofting)
- Doctor Dolittle and his Animal Family (1999, by Hugh Lofting)
- Doctor Dolittle and Tommy Stubbins (1999, by Hugh Lofting)
- Doctor Dolittle Meets the Pushmi-Pullyu (1999, by Hugh Lofting)
- Doctor Dolittle's Journey (1999, by Hugh Lofting)
