= Melissa Ponzio =

American actress

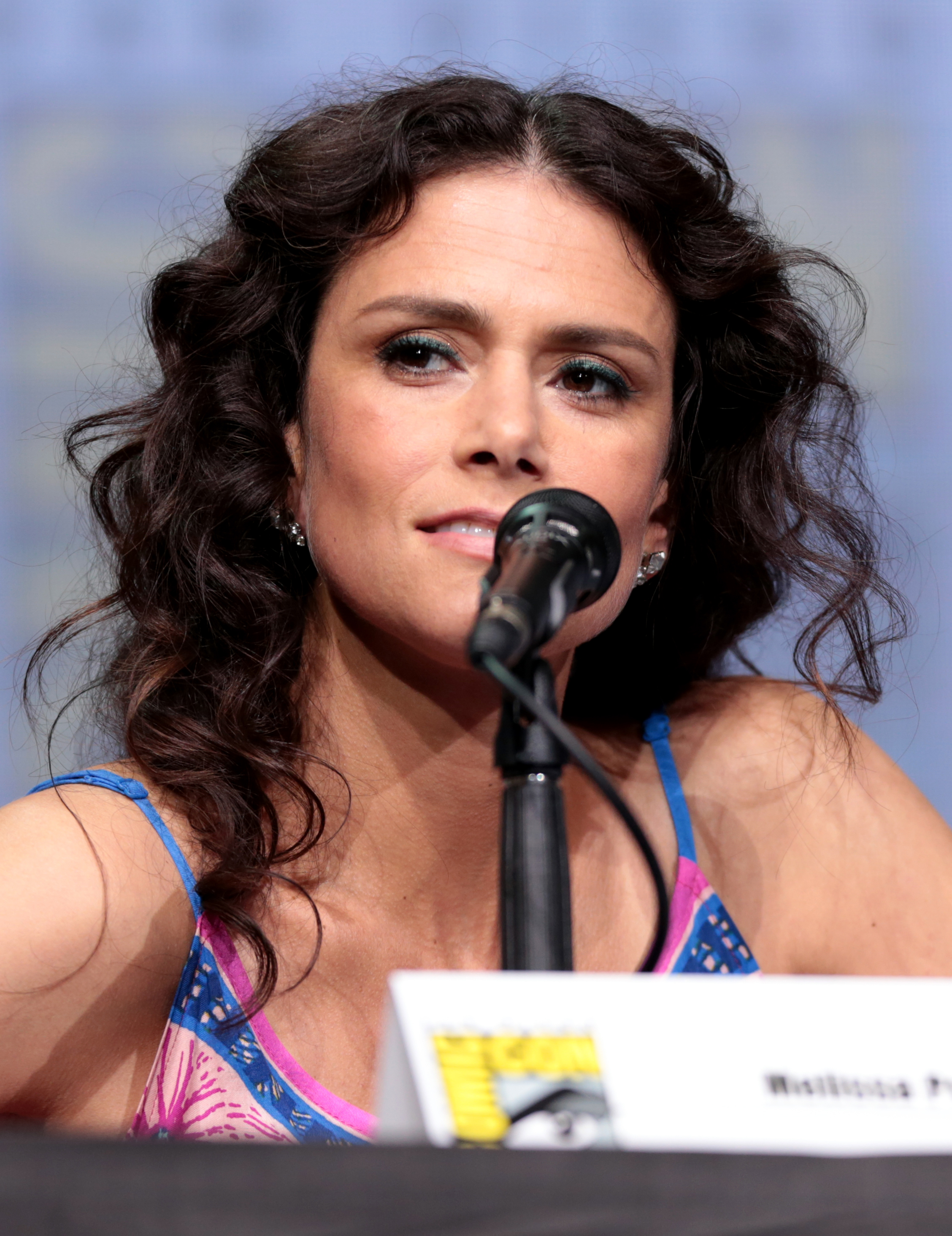
- Ponzio in 2017
- Education: Georgia State University
- Occupation: Actress
- Years active: 1999–present
- Known for: Teen Wolf, Chicago Fire
- Partner: Kenny Alfonso

Melissa Ponzio is an American actress, best known for her roles as Melissa McCall on Teen Wolf and Karen on The Walking Dead. Ponzio has also starred in Chicago Fire as Donna Robbins-Boden.

== Early life ==
She spent much of her youth in Florida, where she was active in school activities, serving as senior class president, yearbook editor, and a member of the swim team. After high school, she attended DeKalb Community College before transferring to Georgia State University, where she earned a bachelor's degree in journalism with a minor in theatre.

== Career ==
In the late 1990s, Ponzio began appearing in supporting guest roles on television series, including Dawson's Creek, One Tree Hill, Surface, Drop Dead Diva, CSI: Crime Scene Investigation, The Gates, NCIS, The Following and Banshee. She also appeared in films The Greenskeeper (2002), Road Trip: Beer Pong (2009), Life as We Know It (2010) and Upside (2010).

Ponzio is known for her recurring roles as Angie on the Lifetime Television drama series Army Wives (2007–2009), and as Melissa McCall in the MTV teen drama Teen Wolf (2011–2017). In 2013, she had a recurring role as Karen in the AMC drama series The Walking Dead.

In September 2021, it was announced that a reunion film for Teen Wolf had been ordered by Paramount+, with Jeff Davis returning as a screenwriter and executive producer of the film. The majority of the original cast members, including Ponzio, were set to reprise their roles. The film was released on January 26, 2023.

== Personal life ==
Ponzio's partner is fellow actor Kenny Alfonso.

== Filmography ==
=== Film ===
Year	Title	Role	Notes
1999	Atlanta Blue	Mona	
2002	The Greenskeeper	Elena Rodriguez	
2009	Road Trip: Beer Pong	The Fare	Direct-to-video
2010	Life as We Know It	Victoria (stripper cousin)	
2010	Upside	Dr. Leinman	
2012	Undocumented Executive	Anita Vasquez	
2020	Max and Me	Melissa	
2021	Thunder Force	Rachel Gonzales	
2023	Teen Wolf: The Movie	Melissa McCall	
2025	Weapons	Archer's wife	

=== Television ===
Year	Title	Role	Notes
1999	Shake, Rattle and Roll: An American Love Story	New York executive	Television film
2001–2002	Dawson's Creek	Robin Ellsworth / female student	Guest role; 3 episodes
2003–2004	One Tree Hill	Alice	Guest role; 2 episodes
2005	Warm Springs	Lucy Mercer	Television film
2006	Surface	Ann Tracy	Guest role; 2 episodes
2006	Thief	Flight attendant	Television mini-series
2007–2009	Army Wives	Angie	Recurring role
2007	October Road	Young girl	Episode: "Pilot"
2007	K-Ville	Yasmine Quaid	Episode: "Critical Mass"
2008	Little Britain USA	Barbara	Episode: #1.03
2009	My Fake Fiance	Sales Lady	Television film
2009	Drop Dead Diva	Selette Garner	Episode: "Do Over"
2009	The Vampire Diaries	Daphne	Episode: "The Turning Point"
2010	CSI: Crime Scene Investigation	Sasha Katsaros	Episode: "The Panty Sniffer"
2010	Past Life	Dr. Steen	Episode: "Gone Daddy Gone"
2010	The Gates	Gloria Bennett	Episode: "Jurisdiction"
2010	Marry Me	Erica	Television mini-series
2011	Justice for Natalee Holloway	Debra Stanville	Television film
2011	Franklin & Bash	Annie Ross	Episode: "Pilot"
2011	Necessary Roughness	Lisa Genovese	Episode: "Anchor Management"
2011	NCIS: Naval Criminal Investigative Service	Drew Turner	Episode: "Enemy on the Hill"
2011	CSI: Miami	Kathy Jennings	Episode: "Crowned"
2011–2017	Teen Wolf	Melissa McCall	Recurring role (seasons 1–5); main role (season 6)
2012	Touch	Gwen Davis	Episode: "Gyre, Part 2"
2013	Mary and Martha	Alice	Television film
2013	The Walking Dead	Karen	Recurring role (seasons 3–4)
2013	The Following	Joan Garcia	Episode: Pilot
2013	Banshee	Jocelyn Frears	Guest role; 2 episodes
2013	Second Generation Wayans	Lorin Sandler	Guest role; 2 episodes
2014–2021	Chicago Fire	Donna Robbins-Boden	Recurring role (seasons 2–9)
2018	Cheerleader Nightmare	Paula	Television film
2019	Killer Reputation	Ramona	Television film
2024	The Big Door Prize	Freya	Guest role; 2 episodes (season 2)
2024	Reasonable Doubt	Lucy Wargo	Recurring role (season 2)
