= Ismael Villegas =

Puerto Rican baseball player (born 1976)

- Pitcher
- Born: August 12, 1976 (age 50); Rio Piedras, Puerto Rico
- Batted: Right Threw: Right

MLB debut
- July 3, 2000, for the Atlanta Braves

Last MLB appearance
- July 3, 2000, for the Atlanta Braves

MLB statistics
- Win–loss record: 0–0
- ERA: 13.50
- Strikeouts: 2
- Stats at Baseball Reference

Teams
- Atlanta Braves (2000)

Ismael Villegas Diaz (born August 12, 1976) is a Puerto Rican former Major League Baseball (MLB) pitcher.

Villegas was drafted by the Chicago Cubs in the fifth round of the 1995 Major League Baseball draft. In June 1996, the Cubs traded him to the Atlanta Braves for Tyler Houston.

Villegas was called up to the Major Leagues in July 2000 after Mike Remlinger suffered an injury and Don Wengert was designated for assignment. He made his Major League debut on July 3, 2000 at Turner Field in relief of Terry Mulholland. He would face 15 batters and get eight outs, allowing four earned runs to score. He twice faced future Hall of Famer Vlad Guerrero, first hitting him with a pitch and then getting him to ground out. A few days later he would be replaced on the roster by pitcher Scott Kamieniecki and would not pitch in the Major Leagues again.

Villegas signed with the Oakland Athletics following the 2001 season but, after posting an 8.46 earned run average with the Sacramento River Cats, he would finish the 2002 season as well as his career with the Atlantic City Surf of the independent Atlantic League.
