= Keith Lockhart (baseball) =

American baseball player (born 1964)

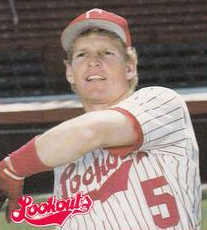
- Lockhart in 1988
- Second baseman
- Born: November 10, 1964 (age 61); Whittier, California, U.S.
- Batted: Left Threw: Right

MLB debut
- April 5, 1994, for the San Diego Padres

Last MLB appearance
- September 27, 2003, for the San Diego Padres

MLB statistics
- Batting average: .261
- Home runs: 44
- Runs batted in: 268
- Stats at Baseball Reference

Teams
- San Diego Padres (1994); Kansas City Royals (1995–1996); Atlanta Braves (1997–2002); San Diego Padres (2003)

Keith Virgil Lockhart (born November 10, 1964) is an American former major league second baseman and third baseman who played for 10 seasons in Major League Baseball from 1994 to 2003.

== Career ==
Lockhart, a left-handed batter, played college baseball at Oral Roberts University and was originally drafted by Cincinnati Reds in the 11th round of the 1986 Amateur Draft. He spent 8 full seasons in the minor league systems of three different organizations before earning a spot on the San Diego Padres' opening day roster in 1994. He played in 27 games with the Padres in his first year before leaving as a free agent and signing with the Kansas City Royals during the 1994 season.

Lockhart played for the Royals in both 1995 and 1996. In his first season, he batted a career best .321, earning him a role as a platoon player in 1996. Sharing time at second base with Bip Roberts and at third base with Joe Randa and Craig Paquette, Lockhart hit .273 and drove in 55 runs.

Shortly before the start of the 1997 season, Lockhart and outfielder Michael Tucker were traded to the Atlanta Braves for outfielder Jermaine Dye, and Rule 5 selection Jamie Walker.

Lockhart stayed in Atlanta for six seasons, from 1997 to 2002. He primarily served as a reserve second baseman and also served as a pinch hitter, contributing 59 pinch hits as a Brave. He served as a platoon player on two occasions with the Braves; in 1998 (a year which saw the Braves win a team-record 106 games), Lockhart platooned with Tony Graffanino, while in 2002, he platooned with Mark DeRosa following an injury to Marcus Giles.

He came close to being the hero of the Braves' epic struggle with the New York Mets in Game 5 of the 1999 NLCS. Lockhart, who came into the game as a replacement after Bret Boone was pinch-run for, hit an RBI triple in the 15th inning to give the Braves a 3–2 lead. The lead was squandered in the bottom of the inning, however, after a bases loaded walk tied the game; Robin Ventura's famed Grand Slam Single would later win it for the Mets.

In 2003, he returned to San Diego for what would be his last major league season and served as the backup to Mark Loretta. He retired at season's end with a .261 career batting average, 44 career home runs, and 268 runs batted in.

Lockhart was the final out of the 1999 World Series. Facing Mariano Rivera, he flied out to Chad Curtis in left field.

In 2011, his son Danny became a 10th-round draft pick for the Cubs and has signed with their farm team.
