= John Rocker =

American baseball player (born 1974)

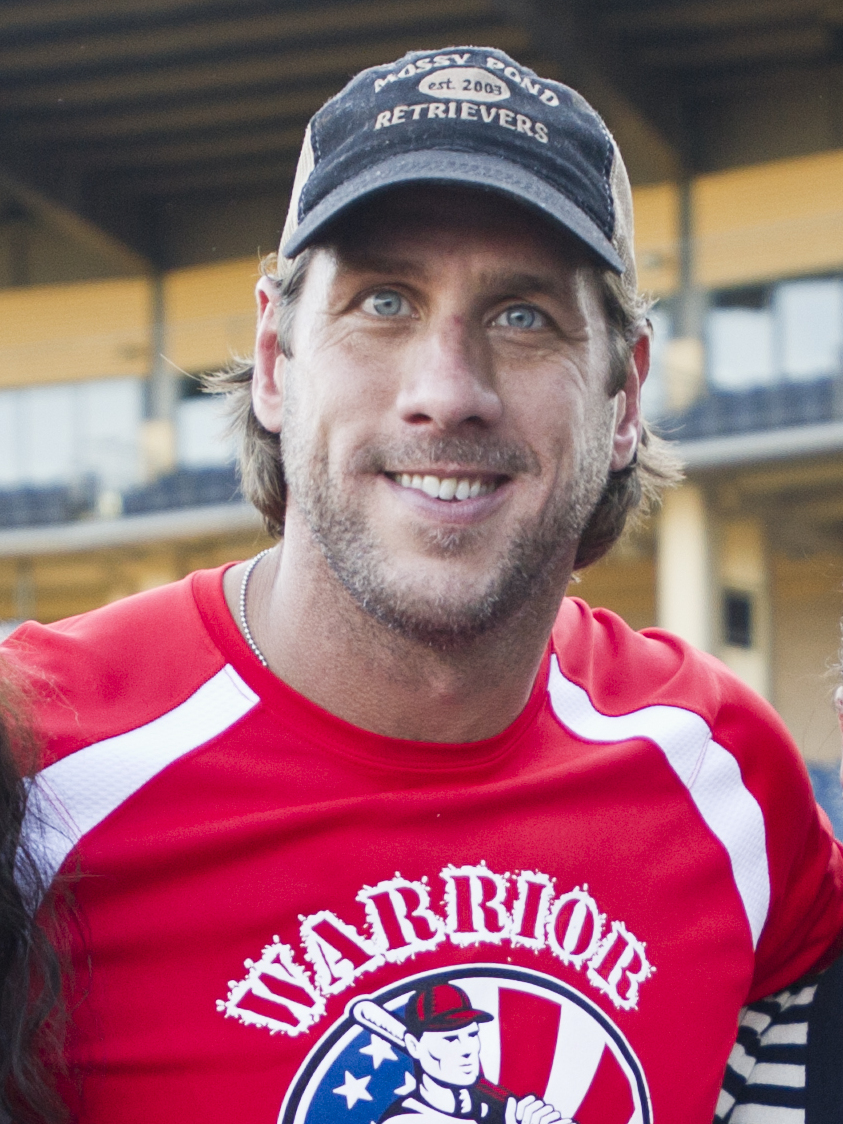
- Rocker in 2014
- Pitcher
- Born: October 17, 1974 (age 52); Statesboro, Georgia, U.S.
- Batted: Right Threw: Left

MLB debut
- May 5, 1998, for the Atlanta Braves

Last MLB appearance
- May 14, 2003, for the Tampa Bay Devil Rays

MLB statistics
- Win–loss record: 13–22
- Earned run average: 3.42
- Strikeouts: 332
- Saves: 88
- Stats at Baseball Reference

Teams
- Atlanta Braves (1998–2001); Cleveland Indians (2001); Texas Rangers (2002); Tampa Bay Devil Rays (2003)

John Loy Rocker (born October 17, 1974) is an American former professional baseball relief pitcher who played six seasons in Major League Baseball (MLB), primarily with the Atlanta Braves. Rocker made his major league debut in 1998 with the Braves, where he spent four seasons and was later a member of the Cleveland Indians, Texas Rangers and Tampa Bay Devil Rays. He last played professionally for the Long Island Ducks of the Atlantic League of Professional Baseball in 2005.

Rocker received notoriety during his career for making controversial statements, which began with a 1999 Sports Illustrated interview and continued after his retirement. Following the conclusion of his baseball career, Rocker competed on Survivor: San Juan del Sur with girlfriend Julie McGee, placing 16th.

== Baseball career ==
In high school, Rocker was a pitcher for First Presbyterian Day School in Macon, Georgia. He threw three no-hitters during his high-school career. He initially committed to play college baseball for the Georgia Bulldogs. The Atlanta Braves selected Rocker in the 18th round (516th overall) of the 1993 Major League Baseball draft.

In 1998, the Braves promoted Rocker to the major leagues. In his first season in the major leagues, he was 1–3 with a 2.13 ERA in 38 innings pitched. The following year, an injury put Atlanta closer Kerry Ligtenberg on the disabled list, moving Rocker into the role of closer, where he was 4–5 with 38 saves and a 2.49 ERA. In 2000, he was 1–2 with 24 saves, posting a 2.89 ERA but in June 2000, Rocker was demoted after threatening a reporter.

Rocker started to receive intense taunting from opposing teams' fans due to his negative behavior and his pitching performance began to decline. On June 22, 2001, Rocker, along with minor-league infielder Troy Cameron (Atlanta's first-round draft pick in 1997), was traded to the Cleveland Indians for right-handed relievers Steve Karsay and Steve Reed along with cash. In Cleveland, his record that year was 3–7 with a 5.45 ERA and four saves. Rocker pitched in the ALDS against the Seattle Mariners. After the season, the Indians traded him to the Texas Rangers for pitcher David Elder. In Texas, he refused designation to the minor leagues. In 2002, he again struggled at 2–3 with a 6.66 ERA and was released. In 2003, Rocker signed with the Tampa Bay Devil Rays but was released after two appearances and an ERA of 9.00.

Rocker took the 2004 season off to recover from surgery on his left shoulder. In 2005, he signed with the Long Island Ducks of the independent Atlantic League. In April 2005, he asked New Yorkers to "bury the hatchet." After going 0–2 with a 6.50 ERA in 23 games, he was released on June 27, 2005.

== Controversies ==
=== Controversial statements ===
In a story published in the December 27, 1999, issue of Sports Illustrated, Rocker made a number of allegations stemming from his experiences in New York City and answering a question about whether he would ever play for the New York Yankees or the New York Mets:

I'd retire first. It's the most hectic, nerve-wracking city. Imagine having to take the 7 Train to the ballpark looking like you're riding through Beirut next to some kid with purple hair, next to some queer with AIDS, right next to some dude who just got out of jail for the fourth time, right next to some 20-year-old mom with four kids. It's depressing... The biggest thing I don't like about New York are the foreigners. You can walk an entire block in Times Square and not hear anybody speaking English. Asians and Koreans and Vietnamese and Indians and Russians and Spanish people and everything up there. How the hell did they get in this country?

During the interview, he also spoke of his opinion of the New York Mets and their fans:

Nowhere else in the country do people spit at you, throw bottles at you, throw quarters at you, throw batteries at you and say, "Hey, I did your mother last night—she's a whore." I talked about what degenerates they were and they proved me right.

The interview was conducted while driving to a speaking engagement in Atlanta. The reporter, Jeff Pearlman, wrote that during the interview session, Rocker spat on a Georgia State Route 400 toll machine and mocked Asian women. Also, Rocker referred to Curaçaoan teammate Randall Simon as a "fat monkey".

Although Rocker later apologized after speaking with Braves legend and Hall of Famer Hank Aaron and former Atlanta mayor and congressman Andrew Young, he continued to make controversial remarks. For his comments, Commissioner Bud Selig suspended Rocker without pay for the remainder of spring training and the first 28 games of the 2000 season, which on appeal was reduced to 14 games (without a spring-training suspension).

In 2002, while with the Rangers, Rocker again made national headlines for his views after directing slurs towards patrons of a Dallas restaurant at which he was dining, located in the predominantly gay neighborhood of Oak Lawn.

In June 2006, Rocker defended former teammate Ozzie Guillén, at the time the manager of the Chicago White Sox, for referring to Chicago Sun-Times sports columnist Jay Mariotti as a "fag". Guillen, a native of Venezuela, claimed it was not a derogatory term and that, in Venezuela, the term only questions another man's courage rather than his sexual orientation.

"This is a free country. If he wants to use a lewd term, he should be able to use a lewd term," Rocker told the Chicago Tribune. "Can't you use a lewd term in America if you want?" Referring to sensitivity training, he was quoted as saying: "It was a farce, a way for the scared little man, Bud Selig, to get people off his ass." Rocker stated that when he attended mandatory sensitivity training he would seldom remain longer than 15 minutes. He also claimed he never paid the $500 fine that was levied against him.

In late 2006, Rocker was interviewed by the sports blog Deadspin, along with fitness model and then-girlfriend Alicia Marie. In the interview, Rocker discussed his "Speak English" campaign, as well as his upcoming book, Rocker: Scars & Strikes. Rocker stated that the book would not be used to try to repair his reputation, but would rather be "more conservative Republican rantings". Also during the interview, Rocker lambasted John Schuerholz, his former general manager with the Braves, calling him "a piece of shit".

On Survivor, during an argument with fellow castmate Natalie Anderson, Rocker told her, "If you were a man, I'd knock your teeth out."

Following the Russian invasion of Ukraine in 2022, Rocker began voicing a number of Ukrainophobic statements. In February 2025 he celebrated the US halting the restoration of Ukraine's energy grid following Russian airstrikes. In March he said "We were trained to believe that China and Russia are the mortal enemies – Europe and Ukraine are the real mortal enemies."

=== Steroid use ===
In March 2007, Rocker was implicated in a steroid ring that included Applied Pharmacy of Mobile, Alabama. Rocker initially denied the reports that he had used somatropin (human growth hormone; HGH) but a spokesperson later claimed that Rocker had been prescribed HGH following a shoulder surgery. In December 2011, he admitted to using steroids, saying, "Yeah, of course I was [using steroids]. I mean who wasn't? Let’s be honest here, who wasn't?"

== Movie and television appearances ==
The comments made by Rocker about New York City would be lampooned by the MTV animated series Celebrity Deathmatch in their episode "Celebrity Deathmatch: North vs. South"; befitting the theme, his opponent was New York Yankees icon Derek Jeter, though he would not portray himself in the episode, being impersonated by a worker on the show, Sean Lynch.

Rocker made his screen-acting debut in the 2002 horror comedy The Greenskeeper as a murderous golf-club groundskeeper.

In 2006, Rocker appeared on the Spike TV network's Pros vs. Joes, a program that pits retired professional athletes against amateurs.

In August 2014 it was announced that Rocker would appear on the 29th season of the competitive reality series Survivor alongside his girlfriend Julie McGee. He was the third person voted out, finishing in 16th place after he became the center of negative attention. He was immediately recognized by some of the other players who were aware of his controversial statements. He was voted out of the game with an immunity idol in his pocket on Day 8. McGee made it to the merge phase of the game, but quit in 12th place after suffering an emotional breakdown, citing the negativity surrounding Rocker earlier in the game as one of the multiple reasons that she decided to withdraw from the competition.

Though not directly based on Rocker, Danny McBride said of character Kenny Powers, the main protagonist of the HBO series Eastbound and Down, that the "sort of attitude" exemplified by Rocker was "more or less an inspiration" for the character.

== Other media activity ==
In December 2011, Rocker released his autobiography, Scars and Strikes. From 2012 to 2015, he wrote for WorldNetDaily, a conservative political site. In November 2025, he appeared on an episode of "The Sam Hyde Show."

== See also ==
- Tampa Bay Rays all-time roster
- List of Major League Baseball players named in the Mitchell Report
