= Quilvio Veras =

Dominican baseball player (born 1971)

- Second baseman
- Born: April 3, 1971 (age 55); Santo Domingo, Dominican Republic
- Batted: Switch Threw: Right

MLB debut
- April 25, 1995, for the Florida Marlins

Last MLB appearance
- July 13, 2001, for the Atlanta Braves

MLB statistics
- Batting average: .270
- Home runs: 32
- Run batted in: 239
- Stolen bases: 183
- Stats at Baseball Reference

Teams
- Florida Marlins (1995–1996); San Diego Padres (1997–1999); Atlanta Braves (2000–2001)

Career highlights and awards
- NL stolen base leader (1995)

Quilvio Alberto Veras Perez (born April 3, 1971) is a Dominican former professional baseball second baseman. He played in Major League Baseball (MLB) for the Florida Marlins, San Diego Padres, and Atlanta Braves. Veras has coached in the minor leagues for the Kansas City Royals organization following the conclusion of his playing career.

== Playing career ==
Signed by the New York Mets as an amateur free agent in 1989, Veras was named to the Triple-A All-Star Game while playing for the Norfolk Tides in 1994. He was subsequently traded to the Florida Marlins for Carl Everett in November 1994, and made the Marlins' Opening Day roster, debuting at the major league level on April 25, 1995. In 1995, Veras' rookie season, he led Major League Baseball with 56 stolen bases. At the conclusion of the season, Veras ranked second behind Chuck Carr for the franchise record in stolen bases. He set single-season franchise records in walks (80), tripes (7), and runs scored (86). Veras tied the franchise record with nine hit-by-pitches, and led all major league rookies with a .384 on-base percentage. During the 1996 season, Veras was injured on May 10, placed on the disabled list for a month and a half, and played in 43 major league games thereafter, eventually being sent to the Charlotte Knights. On July 14, 1996, Veras made the final out in a no-hitter pitched by Ramón Martínez.

In November 1996, Veras was traded from the Marlins to the San Diego Padres for Dustin Hermanson. In June 1998, Veras had to leave a game because his brother had been murdered in the Dominican Republic. On July 15, 1999, he scored the first ever run at Safeco Field. That October, he wore a harness to combat looseness in his left shoulder.

On December 22, 1999, he was traded from the San Diego Padres to the Atlanta Braves along with Wally Joyner and Reggie Sanders, in exchange for Ryan Klesko, Bret Boone, and a minor leaguer. In January 2000, the Braves and Veras avoided arbitration by agreeing to a one-year deal worth $3 million for the season. He hit for a career-high .309 batting average for the Braves in 2000 before tearing his ACL in a game against the Baltimore Orioles on July 14, 2000.

Veras returned to the Braves' lineup in 2001, but would be plagued with injuries in what would be his final season, eventually being designated for assignment by the Braves after suffering injuries to his rib cage and ankle. He appeared in his final major league game on July 13, 2001. Veras subsequently signed a minor league contract with the Boston Red Sox in August 2001, and participated in spring training with the team prior to the 2002 season. In December 2002, Veras signed a minor league contract with the Los Angeles Dodgers.

In 767 games over seven seasons, Veras posted a .270 batting average (750-for-2780) with 469 runs, 129 doubles, 15 triples, 32 home runs, 239 RBI, 183 stolen bases, 427 bases on balls, .372 on-base percentage and .362 slugging percentage. He finished his career with a .985 fielding percentage. In 14 postseason games, all in 1998, he hit .204 (11-for-54) with 6 runs, 3 RBI and 9 walks.

== Coaching career ==
The Kansas City Royals hired Veras as a roving coach for the 2008 season, and retained him as a bunting and baserunning coordinator the next year. Veras returned to the Royals organization in 2018 as the bunting and baserunning coach for the Dominican Summer League Royals. He remained in the position for the 2019 season. Veras was not retained for the 2020 season, but returned in the bunting and baserunning role for the 2021 season. In 2022 and 2023, Veras served as the bench coach.

== See also ==
- List of Major League Baseball annual stolen base leaders
- List of Major League Baseball career stolen bases leaders
