= Dead Poets Society =

1989 film directed by Peter Weir

- Theatrical release poster
- Directed by: Peter Weir
- Written by: Tom Schulman
- Produced by: Steven Haft; Paul Junger Witt; Tony Thomas
- Starring: Robin Williams
- Cinematography: John Seale
- Edited by: William Anderson
- Music by: Maurice Jarre
- Production companies: Touchstone Pictures; Silver Screen Partners IV
- Distributed by: Buena Vista Pictures Distribution
- Release date: June 2, 1989
- Running time: 128 minutes
- Country: United States
- Language: English
- Budget: $16.4 million
- Box office: $235.8 million

Dead Poets Society is a 1989 American coming-of-age film directed by Peter Weir and written by Tom Schulman. It stars Robin Williams and is set in 1959 at a fictional boarding school called Welton Academy, and focuses around a select group of boys, who over time take several pieces of advice from their English teacher, John Keating (Williams).

Schulman wrote the script for Dead Poets Society in 1985 based on his own experiences at the Montgomery Bell Academy in Nashville, Tennessee. Jeff Kanew was originally hired as director, but was eventually replaced by Weir. Weir met with Jeffrey Katzenberg, chairman of Walt Disney Studios in 1988, who suggested Weir read Schulman's script. Weir was interested and later flew back to Los Angeles to begin casting. Shooting began on November 14, 1988, around several locations in Delaware, and wrapped on January 15, 1989.

Dead Poets Society was released on June 2, 1989, initially as a limited theatrical release, before receiving a wide release in the United States on June 9. A novel based on the film was also released the same year. The film received positive reviews from critics, who praised Williams' performance. It grossed $235.8 million at the box office, against its $16.4 million production budget, becoming the fifth-highest grossing film of 1989. The film also received many accolades, including the BAFTA Award for Best Film at the 43rd British Academy Film Awards, with producers Steven Haft, Paul Junger Witt, Tony Thomas, and Weir collecting the award.

== Plot ==
In the fall of 1959, Todd Anderson begins his junior year of high school at Welton Academy, an Episcopal all-male preparatory boarding school in Vermont. He is assigned one of Welton's top students, Neil Perry, as his roommate, and meets Neil's friends: Knox Overstreet, Richard Cameron, Steven Meeks, Gerard Pitts, and Charlie Dalton.

On the first day of classes, the boys meet John Keating, their new English teacher. Keating teaches them the Latin expression carpe diem, encouraging them to "seize the day". During his classes, he has the students take turns standing on his desk to demonstrate ways to look at life differently, tells them to rip out the introduction of their poetry books that explains a mathematical formula for rating poetry, and invites them to make up their own style of walking in a courtyard to form their individualism. These unusual methods attract the attention of strict headmaster, Gale Nolan.

Upon learning that Keating had been a member of the unofficial Dead Poets Society during his time as a student, Neil restarts the club. He and his friends sneak off campus to a cave to read poetry. Keating's lessons and the conversations in the club encourage them to live on their own terms.

Knox pursues Chris Noel, a cheerleader who is dating Chet Danburry, a football player whose family is friends with his. Neil discovers his love of acting and wins the role of Puck in a local production of A Midsummer Night's Dream despite the disapproval of his authoritarian father, who wants him to attend medical school. Keating helps Todd come out of his shell when he takes him through an exercise in self-expression, resulting in his spontaneous composition of a poem in front of the class.

Charlie publishes an article in the school newspaper on behalf of the Dead Poets Society recommending that girls be admitted to Welton. In response, Nolan paddles Charlie, attempting to force him to reveal the names of the other members of the Dead Poets Society; Charlie refuses. Keating gently admonishes him, advising the boys that one must assess all potential consequences of one's actions.

On the eve of the play's opening performance, Neil's father discovers his involvement and demands that he quit. Neil performs in the play, but his father retaliates by telling him he plans to withdraw him from Welton and enroll him in Braden Military School in preparation for Harvard Medical School. Lacking support from his mother and unable to explain his feelings to his father, a devastated Neil commits suicide.

At Neil's parents' request, Nolan investigates his death. Cameron shifts blame onto Keating to avoid punishment for his role in the Dead Poets Society, and he names the other members of the group. Charlie punches him for his betrayal and is expelled. Each of the boys is called to Nolan's office to sign a letter confirming Cameron's false allegations. Todd reluctantly signs under his parents' pressure, and Keating is fired.

Nolan takes over Keating's English class. As Keating interrupts the class to gather his belongings, Todd confesses that the boys were pressured into signing the letter that led to his dismissal. Keating assures Todd that he believes him. Nolan threatens to expel Todd and anyone else who speaks out of line. Despite the threat, Todd stands up on his desk and says, "O Captain! My Captain!". Several other members of the Dead Poets Society, along with several classmates, follow suit. Touched by their support, Keating proudly thanks the boys and departs.

== Cast ==
The cast of Dead Poets Society is as follows:

- Robin Williams as John Keating
- Robert Sean Leonard as Neil Perry
- Ethan Hawke as Todd Anderson
- Josh Charles as Knox Overstreet
- Gale Hansen as Charlie Dalton
- Dylan Kussman as Richard Cameron
- Allelon Ruggiero as Steven Meeks
- James Waterston as Gerard Pitts
- Alexandra Powers as Chris Noel, Knox's love interest and a cheerleader at Ridgeway High
- Norman Lloyd as Dr. Gale Nolan, headmaster of Welton Academy
- Kurtwood Smith as Thomas Perry, Neil's domineering father
- George Martin as Dr. Hager, mathematics teacher

== Production ==
=== Development and casting ===
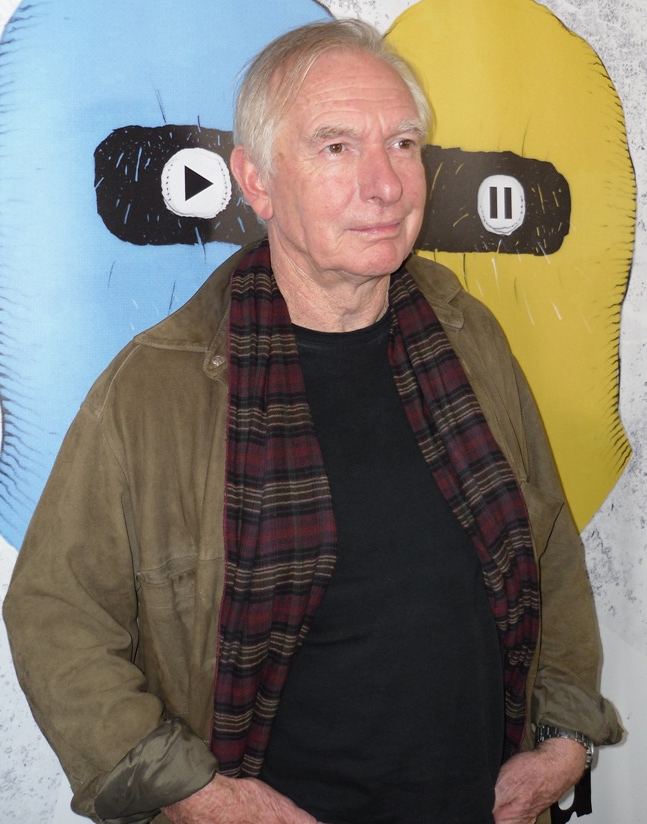
Peter Weir (pictured in 2011) served as the primary director after Jeff Kanew was replaced.

Dead Poets Society was written by Tom Schulman in 1985, based on his experiences at the Montgomery Bell Academy in Nashville, Tennessee. Originally, Jeff Kanew was hired as director and had envisioned that Liam Neeson would take on the role of Keating, as well as Dustin Hoffman, Mel Gibson, Tom Hanks, and Mickey Rourke also starring. However, Kanew was subsequently replaced by Peter Weir, after Weir met with Jeffrey Katzenberg, the CEO of Disney in 1988, and suggested that Weir read Schulman's script. Weir was captivated by it and six weeks later returned to Los Angeles to begin casting. Early notes on the script from Disney also suggested making the boys' passion dancing rather than poetry, as well as a new title, Sultans of Swing, focusing on the character of Mr. Keating rather than on the boys, but both were dismissed outright.

Dead Poets Society held two open casting calls, during which more than 3,000 extras were used. Robin Williams cracked many jokes on set during filming, which Ethan Hawke found irritating. However, Hawke's first agent signed with Hawke when Williams told him that Hawke would "do really well". The production team auditioned over 500 actors before finalizing the official cast. Weir had many ideas about who would make the perfect Mr. Keating, and eventually cast Williams, who was later nominated for an Oscar for his performance.

=== Filming ===
Principal photography began on November 14, 1988, with a budget of $16.4 million. The film was shot around several locations in Delaware, with filming mainly taking place at St. Andrew's School. Classroom scenes with Keating were shot in a replica classroom built on a soundstage in Wilmington, Delaware. Filming at St. Andrew's mainly occurred during over the Thanksgiving and Christmas holidays, primarily to avoid disruption to the school's academic system. To emphasize a film set back in time, storefronts in Delaware towns were transformed, with all modern conveniences removed. Weir requested that the young cast not use modern slang during filming, even while off camera. Weir also stated that he hid a half-day's filming from Disney executives to allow Williams free range to use his comedic improvisational skills Filming concluded on January 15, 1989.

== Release ==
Dead Poets Society was released theatrically in New York City, Los Angeles, San Francisco, and Toronto on June 2, 1989, before expanding to a wide release on June 9. A novel based on the film, written by Nancy H. Kleinbaum, was also released later the same year. It was also shown at the 46th Venice International Film Festival, and the Tokyo International Film Festival. The film was released onto VHS on March 28, 1990, and on DVD on November 10, 1998, being distributed by Buena Vista Home Entertainment. A LaserDisc version of the film was also released, which includes additional extended footage.

=== Box office ===
Dead Poets Society was a box office success. During its first week of release, it earned $340,456. The film then jumped to a total of $7,540,464 the week of June 9, before earning $9,102,459 the next week. During its third weekend, it was the third best-selling movie, surpassing Star Trek V: The Final Frontier (1989). It dropped to number five during the week of June 23, earning $7,344,976. During its fourth and fifth weekends, it grossed $6,708,768 and $5,186,264 respectively, with Indiana Jones and the Last Crusade (1989) passing it in its sixth. In its final week in August 1989, it concluded with $963,442 at number 17. By the end of its theatrical run, Dead Poets Society had run across 1,109 theaters worldwide, grossing $95,860,116 in the United States and Canada, along with $140,000,000 in other territories, for a worldwide total of $235,860,116, becoming the fifth-highest grossing film of 1989.

== Critical reception ==
Dead Poets Society received positive reviews from critics upon its release. On the review aggregator Rotten Tomatoes, Dead Poets Society holds an approval rating of 85% based on 66 reviews, with an average score of 7.2/10. The website's critical consensus reads: "Affecting performances from the young cast and a genuinely inspirational turn from Robin Williams grant Peter Weir's prep school drama top honors." On Metacritic, the film received a score of 79 based on 15 reviews, indicating "generally favorable" reviews. Audiences polled by CinemaScore gave the film a rare "A+" grade on a scale of A+ to F.

The Washington Post's reviewer called it "solid, smart entertainment", and praised Robin Williams for giving a "nicely restrained acting performance". Vincent Canby of The New York Times also praised Williams' "exceptionally fine performance", while writing that "Dead Poets Society... is far less about Keating than about a handful of impressionable boys." Luke Buckmaster, writing for The Guardian, praised the film for the way "O Captain! My Captain!" was incorporated into it, and said he felt "inspired" by it. In contrast, film historian Leonard Maltin gave the film a more mixed review, writing "Well made, extremely well acted, but also dramatically obvious and melodramatically one-sided. Nevertheless, Tom Schulman's screenplay won an Oscar." John Simon, writing for National Review, said that Dead Poets Society was the most dishonest film that he had seen in some time.

Pauline Kael was unconvinced about the film and its "middlebrow highmindedness", but praised Williams. "Robin Williams' performance is more graceful than anything he's done before [–] he's totally, concentratedly there – [he] reads his lines stunningly, and when he mimics various actors reciting Shakespeare there's no undue clowning in it; he's a gifted teacher demonstrating his skills." Roger Ebert gave the film a two-star review, saying "Dead Poets Society is a collection of pious platitudes masquerading as a courageous stand in favor of something: doing your own thing, I think." Kevin Dettmar, writing for The Atlantic, criticized Dead Poets Society for its portrayal of literature studying, which he called "misleading" and "deeply seductive", and labelled the lessons that Mr. Keating's character gives as "anti-intellectual".

=== Accolades ===
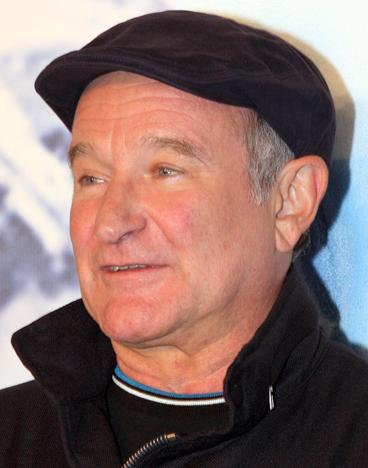
Robin Williams (pictured in 2011) received many accolades for his portrayal as John Keating.

Despite mixed reviews, Dead Poets Society was nominated for and won multiple awards from numerous film organizations and festivals. At the 62nd Academy Awards, producers Steven Haft, Paul Junger Witt, and Tony Thomas were nominated for the Best Picture award, along with Weir and Tom Schulman being nominated for Best Director, and Best Original Screenplay, with the latter winning the category. Williams was also nominated for Best Actor, although he lost to Daniel Day-Lewis for his work on My Left Foot (1989). The 43rd British Academy Film Awards offered the Best Film award to Haft, Junger Witt, Thomas, and Weir, respectively. Schulman was nominated for Best Original Screenplay, while Williams was nominated for Best Actor in a Leading Role. William M. Anderson was nominated for Best Editing, and Weir was nominated for Best Direction, but lost to Kenneth Branagh.

Dead Poets Society was nominated for four awards at the 47th Golden Globe Awards. The film itself was nominated for the category for Best Motion Picture – Drama. Additionally, Williams, Schulman, and Weir were nominated for the Best Actor in a Motion Picture – Drama, Best Director – Motion Picture, and the Best Screenplay – Motion Picture awards respectively, although none ended up winning. The film has independently been nominated for awards also. It was nominated for the Best Motion Picture – Drama award at the 1990 Young Artist Awards and was included on a list of the Top 10 Films of 1989 at the 61st National Board of Review Awards.

== Legacy ==
Since its release, Dead Poets Society has been considered a cult classic amongst viewers. The use of "O Captain! My Captain!" in the film was considered "ironic" by UCLA literature professor Michael C. Cohen, because the students are taking a stand against "repressive conformity", but using a poem intentionally written to be conventional. After Williams's death in August 2014, the hashtag "#ocaptainmycaptain" began trending on Twitter, with many fans paying tribute to Williams by recreating the "O Captain! My Captain!" scene. Williams's performance as Mr. Keating was also considered a "contemporary cinematic classic" by journalist Philip C. Dimare. In the music video for "Fortnight" by the American singer Taylor Swift, from her eleventh studio album The Tortured Poets Department, Ethan Hawke and Josh Charles feature prominently as a nod to the similarity between the titles of the film and the album.

=== Stage play ===
A theatrical adaptation written by Schulman and directed by John Doyle opened off-Broadway on October 27, 2016, and ran through December 11. Jason Sudeikis starred as Mr. Keating, with Thomas Mann as Neil, David Garrison as Gale, Zane Pais as Todd, Francesca Carpanini as Chris, Stephen Barker Turner as Mr. Perry, Will Hochman as Knox, Cody Kostro as Charlie, Yaron Lotan as Richard, and Bubba Weiler as Steven. The production received a mixed review from The New York Times, with critic Ben Brantley calling the play "blunt and bland", and criticizing Sudeikis's performance, citing his lack of enthusiasm when delivering powerful lines.

=== Parodies ===
The ending of the film was parodied in the 2009 Community episode, "Introduction to Film". It was also parodied in the 2016 Saturday Night Live sketch, "Farewell, Mr. Bunting," with Fred Armisen playing Williams's role. The sketch is a largely faithful recreation of the scene, until a student (played by Pete Davidson) is decapitated by a ceiling fan when he jumps on top of his desk. The 2018 television show Derry Girls parodies the plot of Dead Poets Society in the season 2 episode "Ms. De Brún and the Child of Prague". The episode focuses on a new teacher who echoes Mr. Keating's lessons, inspiring the students with the progressive methods.
