= Bill Murphey =

American meteorologist

Bill Murphey is an American meteorologist and the state climatologist of Georgia, as well as the chief meteorologist for the Environmental Protection Division of the Georgia Department of Natural Resources.

Murphey received his B.S., M.S., and Ph.D. degrees from the Georgia Institute of Technology. He then worked as a research meteorologist at the Atmospheric Sciences Research Center at the State University of New York at Albany for eight years. He was named Georgia's state climatologist in 2011 by Governor Nathan Deal, to replace David Stooksbury, whom Deal had previously removed from the same post. Critics accused Deal of replacing Stooksbury with Murphey to gain control over the ability to declare droughts in Georgia. A spokesman for Deal responded to this accusation by saying that Murphey was free to speak however he wanted, and was not "muzzled".
