= Chris Seelbach (baseball) =

American baseball player (born 1972)

- Pitcher
- Born: December 18, 1972 (age 53); Lufkin, Texas, U.S.
- Batted: Right Threw: Right

Professional debut
- MLB: September 9, 2000, for the Atlanta Braves
- NPB: April 2, 2002, for the Nippon-Ham Fighters

Last appearance
- MLB: May 20, 2001, for the Atlanta Braves
- NPB: September 16, 2003, for the Nippon-Ham Fighters

MLB statistics
- Win–loss record: 0–1
- Earned run average: 8.38
- Strikeouts: 9

NPB statistics
- Win–loss record: 10–15
- Earned run average: 4.32
- Strikeouts: 108
- Stats at Baseball Reference

Teams
- Atlanta Braves (2000–2001); Nippon-Ham Fighters (2002–2003)

Christopher Don Seelbach (born December 18, 1972) is an American former Major League Baseball pitcher who played for the Atlanta Braves from 2000-2001. He also played for the Hokkaido Nippon Ham Fighters of Japan's Nippon Professional Baseball in 2002. He was hit on the head by Houston Astros first baseman Lance Berkman. He was immediately taken off the field and sent to the hospital. He did recover.

Seelbach now owns and operates Hit Run Steal, a baseball and softball equipment company.

== Biography ==
Christopher Seelbach was born on Monday, December 18, 1972, in Lufkin, Texas. Seelbach was 27 years old when he broke into the big leagues on September 9, 2000, with the Atlanta Braves

Seelbach was drafted by the Braves in the 4th round of the 1991 MLB draft out of Lufkin High School in Lufkin, TX. Chris also received a baseball scholarship from Mississippi State, but elected to sign with the Braves.

Chris spent 5 years with the Braves organization (reaching AAA) before being traded to the Florida Marlins. After 2 years with the Marlins and short stint with the Seattle Mariners organization, Chris returned to the Braves and reached the Major Leagues in 2000 and 2001.

Following his time with the Braves, Chris signed with Nippon-Ham Fighters of the NPB and spent 2 years with the team.

Seelbach is a former owner/advisor of 80/20 Baseball, which offers online coaching from professionals with MLB experience.

He now owns and operates Hit Run Steal, a manufacturer and distributor of professional baseball and softball equipment. Hit Run Steal's website also features online pitching classes and tips from Seelbach and other professional baseball players.
