= Roger Clemens =

American baseball player (born 1962)

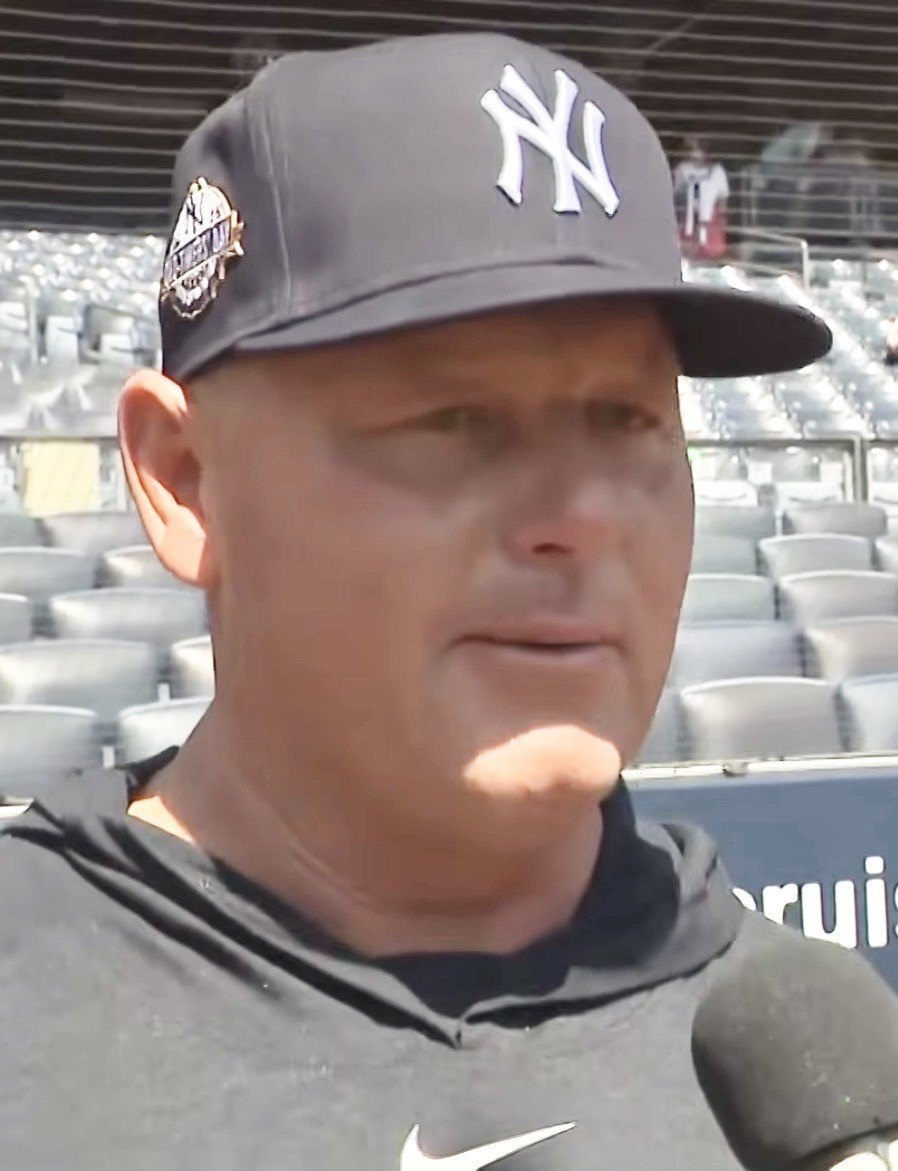
- Clemens in 2025
- Pitcher
- Born: August 4, 1962 (age 64); Dayton, Ohio, U.S.
- Batted: Right Threw: Right

MLB debut
- May 15, 1984, for the Boston Red Sox

Last MLB appearance
- September 16, 2007, for the New York Yankees

MLB statistics
- Win–loss record: 354–184
- Earned run average: 3.12
- Strikeouts: 4,672
- Stats at Baseball Reference

Teams
- Boston Red Sox (1984–1996); Toronto Blue Jays (1997–1998); New York Yankees (1999–2003); Houston Astros (2004–2006); New York Yankees (2007)

Career highlights and awards
- 11× All-Star (1986, 1988, 1990–1992, 1997, 1998, 2001, 2003–2005); 2× World Series champion (1999, 2000); AL MVP (1986); 7× Cy Young Award (1986, 1987, 1991, 1997, 1998, 2001, 2004); 2× Triple Crown (1997, 1998); 4× MLB wins leader (1986, 1987, 1997, 1998); 7× ERA leader (1986, 1990–1992, 1997, 1998, 2005); 5× AL strikeout leader (1988, 1991, 1996–1998); MLB record 20 strikeouts in a nine-inning game (twice); Commissioner's Historic Achievement Award; Major League Baseball All-Century Team; Boston Red Sox Hall of Fame

William Roger Clemens (born August 4, 1962), nicknamed "Rocket", is an American former professional baseball pitcher who played 24 seasons in Major League Baseball (MLB), most notably with the Boston Red Sox and New York Yankees. He was a member of the Red Sox for 13 seasons, the Yankees for six, the Toronto Blue Jays for two, and Houston Astros for three. Clemens was one of the most dominant pitchers in major league history, tallying 354 wins, a 3.12 earned run average (ERA), and 4,672 strikeouts, the third-most all time. An 11-time MLB All-Star and two-time World Series champion, Clemens won seven Cy Young Awards, more than any other pitcher in history. Clemens was known for his fierce competitive nature and hard-throwing pitching style, which he used to intimidate batters.

Clemens debuted in the MLB in 1984 with the Red Sox, whose pitching staff he anchored for 12 years. In 1986, he won the American League (AL) Cy Young Award, the AL Most Valuable Player (MVP) Award, and the All-Star Game MVP Award, and he struck out an MLB-record 20 batters in a single game. After the 1996 season, in which he achieved his second 20-strikeout performance, Clemens left Boston via free agency and joined the Toronto Blue Jays. In each of his two seasons with Toronto, Clemens won a Cy Young Award, as well as the pitching triple crown by leading the league in wins, ERA, and strikeouts. Before the 1999 season, Clemens was traded to the Yankees where he won his two World Series titles. In 2001, Clemens became the first pitcher in major league history to start a season with a win–loss record of 20–1. In 2003, he reached his 300th win and 4,000th strikeout in the same game. Clemens left for the Houston Astros in 2004, where he spent three seasons and won his seventh Cy Young Award. He rejoined the Yankees in 2007 for one last season before retiring. He is the only pitcher in Major League history to record more than 350 wins and strike out more than 4,500 batters.

Clemens was alleged by the Mitchell Report to have used anabolic steroids during his late career, mainly based on testimony given by his former trainer, Brian McNamee. Clemens denied these allegations under oath before the United States Congress, leading congressional leaders to refer his case to the Justice Department on suspicions of perjury. On August 19, 2010, a federal grand jury at the U.S. District Court in Washington, D.C., indicted Clemens on six felony counts involving perjury, false statements, and contempt of Congress. Clemens pleaded not guilty, but proceedings were complicated by prosecutorial misconduct, leading to a mistrial. In June 2012, Clemens was found not guilty on all six counts of lying to Congress. These controversies hurt his chances for election to the Baseball Hall of Fame. He never received the 75% of votes required in his ten years of eligibility, ending with 65.2% in 2022. However, despite the steroid controversies, Clemens is still considered by many as one of the greatest pitchers in baseball history.

== Early life ==
Clemens was born in Dayton, Ohio, the fifth child of Bill and Bess (Lee) Clemens. He is of German descent, his great-grandfather Joseph Clemens having immigrated in the 1880s. Clemens’ parents separated when he was an infant. His mother soon married Woody Booher, whom Clemens considers his father. Booher died when Clemens was nine years old, and Clemens has said that the only time he ever felt envious of other players was when he saw them in the clubhouse with their fathers. Clemens lived in Vandalia, Ohio, until 1977, and then spent most of his high school years in Houston, Texas. At Spring Woods High School, Clemens played baseball for longtime head coach Charles Maiorana and also played football and basketball. He was scouted by the Philadelphia Phillies and Minnesota Twins during his senior year, but opted to go to college.

== College career ==
He began his college career pitching for San Jacinto College North in 1981, where he posted a 9–2 win–loss record. He then attended the University of Texas at Austin, compiling a 25–7 record in two All-American seasons, and was on the mound when the Longhorns won the 1983 College World Series. He became the first player to have his baseball uniform number retired at the University of Texas. In 2004, the Rotary Smith Award, given to America's best college baseball player, was changed to the Roger Clemens Award, honoring the best pitcher. At Texas, Clemens pitched 35 consecutive scoreless innings, an NCAA record that stood until Justin Pope broke it in 2001.

== Professional career ==
=== Drafts and minor leagues ===
The New York Mets selected Clemens in the 12th round of the 1981 Major League Baseball draft, however, he did not sign. Clemens was selected in the first round (19th overall) of the 1983 MLB draft by the Boston Red Sox and quickly rose through the minor league system. In 1983, Clemens pitched for two different teams in two different leagues and at two different levels. He pitched for the A-ball Winter Haven Red Sox of the Florida State League and the AA New Britain Red Sox of the Eastern League. Clemens started all four games he played with Winter Haven, pitched three complete games with one shutout and allowed no home runs. He posted a 3–1 win–loss record, a 1.24 earned run average, struck out 36 batters in 29 innings pitched and his walks plus hits per inning pitched was 0.759. Clemens started all seven games he played with New Britain and pitched one complete game shutout and allowed one home run. He posted a 4–1 win–loss record, a 1.38 earned run average, struck out 59 batters in 52 innings pitched and his walks and hits per innings pitched was 0.827. His combined minor league totals in 1983 included starting all 11 games he played and pitched four complete games with two shutouts and only one home run allowed. He posted a 7–2 win–loss record, a 1.33 earned run average, struck out 95 batters in 81 innings pitched and his walks and hits per innings pitched was 0.802.

Clemens started the 1984 season with AAA Pawtucket Red Sox of the International League. In seven games, he started six of them, pitching three complete games with one shutout. Despite posting a 2–3 win–loss record and walks and hits per innings pitched of 1.136, his earned run average was 1.93, and he struck out 50 batters in 46 2/3 innings pitched.

=== Boston Red Sox (1984–1996) ===
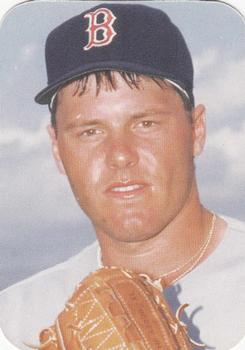
Clemens in 1986

On May 15, 1984, at Cleveland Stadium, Clemens made his Major League debut. An undiagnosed torn labrum threatened to end his career early; he underwent successful arthroscopic surgery by Dr. James Andrews.

On April 29, 1986, at Fenway Park, in a 3–1 win over the Seattle Mariners, Clemens struck out a career-high 20 batters, becoming the first pitcher in MLB history to strike out 20 batters in a nine-inning game. Following his performance, Clemens made the cover of Sports Illustrated, which carried the headline "Lord of the K's [strikeouts]." Other than Clemens, only Kerry Wood, Randy Johnson and Max Scherzer have matched the total. (Johnson fanned 20 batters in nine innings on May 8, 2001. However, the game went into extra innings but Johnson got credit for it as he only pitched 9 innings. Tom Cheney holds the record for any game: 21 strikeouts in 16 innings.)

Clemens started the 1986 All-Star Game (played in his hometown of Houston) in the Astrodome and was named the Most Valuable Player of the contest by throwing three perfect innings and striking out two. He also won the first of his seven Cy Young Awards. In 1986, Clemens won the American League MVP award, finishing with a 24–4 record, 2.48 ERA, and 238 strikeouts. When Hank Aaron said that pitchers should not be eligible for the MVP, Clemens responded: "I wish he was still playing. I'd probably crack his head open to show him how valuable I was." Clemens was the only starting pitcher since Vida Blue in 1971 to win a league MVP award until Justin Verlander won the award in 2011. Clemens attributes his switch from what he calls a "thrower" to a "pitcher" to the partial season Hall of Fame pitcher Tom Seaver spent with the Red Sox in 1986.

Facing the California Angels in the 1986 ALCS, Clemens pitched poorly in the opening game, watched the Boston bullpen blow his 3–1 lead in the bottom of the ninth inning of Game 4, and then pitched a strong Game 7 to wrap up the series for Boston. The League Championship Series clincher was Clemens's first postseason career victory. He did not win his second until 13 years later. After a victory in Game 5, Boston led 3–2 over the New York Mets in the 1986 World Series with Clemens set to start game six at Shea Stadium. Clemens who was pitching on five days rest started strong by striking out eight while throwing a no-hitter through four innings. In the top of eighth and with Boston ahead 3–2, manager John McNamara sent rookie Mike Greenwell to pinch hit for Roger Clemens. It was initially said that Clemens was removed from the game due to a blister forming on one of his fingers, but both he and McNamara dispute this. Clemens said to Bob Costas on an MLB Network program concerning the 1986 postseason that McNamara decided to pull him despite Clemens wanting to pitch. McNamara said to Costas that Clemens "begged out" of the game. The Mets rallied and took both game six and seven to win the World Series.

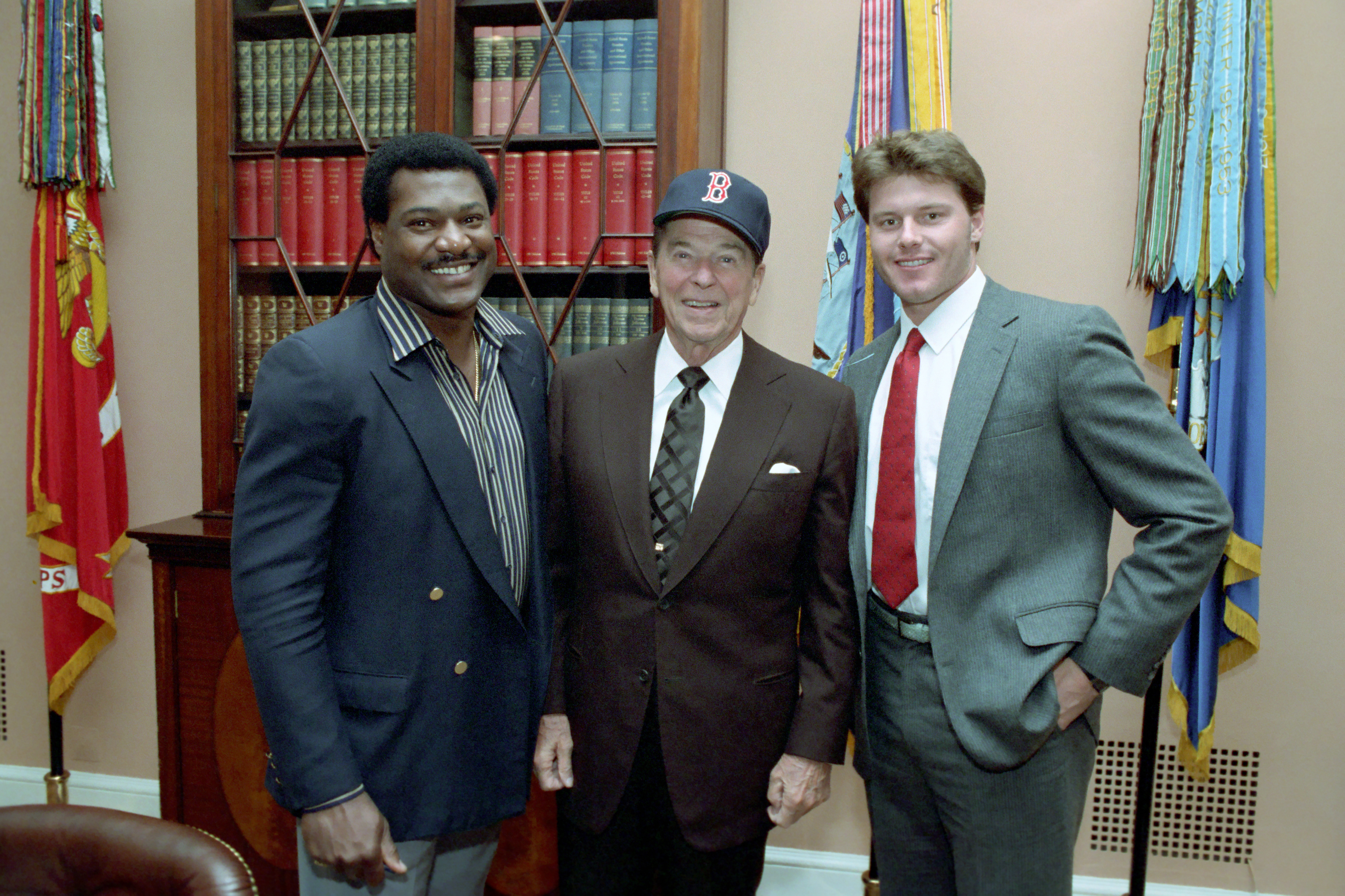
Clemens with Boston teammate Don Baylor and President Ronald Reagan

The Red Sox had a miserable 1987 season, finishing at 78–84, though Clemens won his second consecutive Cy Young Award with a 20–9 record, 2.97 ERA, 256 strikeouts, and seven shutouts. He was the first AL pitcher with back-to-back 20-win seasons since Tommy John won 20 with the Yankees in 1979 and '80. Boston rebounded with success in 1988 and 1990, clinching the AL East Division each year, but were swept by the Oakland Athletics in each ALCS matchup. His greatest postseason failure came in the second inning of the final game of the 1990 ALCS, when he was ejected for arguing balls and strikes with umpire Terry Cooney, accentuating the A's four-game sweep of the Red Sox. He was suspended for the first five games of the 1991 season and fined $10,000.

Clemens led the American League in 1988 with 291 strikeouts and a career-high 8 shutouts. On September 10, 1988, Clemens threw a one-hitter against the Cleveland Indians at Fenway Park. Dave Clark's one-out single in the eighth inning was the only hit Clemens allowed in the game. In a 9–1 victory over Cleveland on April 13, 1989, Clemens recorded his 1,000 career strikeout by fanning Brook Jacoby with the bases loaded in the second inning. Clemens finished second to Oakland's Bob Welch for the 1990 AL Cy Young Award, despite the fact that Clemens crushed Welch in ERA (1.93 to 2.95), strikeouts (209 to 127), walks (54 to 77), home runs allowed (7 to 26), and WAR (10.4 to 2.9). Clemens did, however, capture his third Cy Young Award in 1991 with an 18–10 record, 2.62 ERA, and 241 strikeouts. On June 21, 1989, Clemens surrendered the first of Sammy Sosa's 609 home runs. On September 18, 1996, at Tiger Stadium, in a 4–0 win over the Detroit Tigers, Clemens had a second 20-strikeout game. This second 20-K day occurred in his third-to-last game as a member of the Boston Red Sox. Later, the Tigers presented him with a baseball containing the autographs of each batter who had struck out (those with multiple strikeouts signed the appropriate number of times).

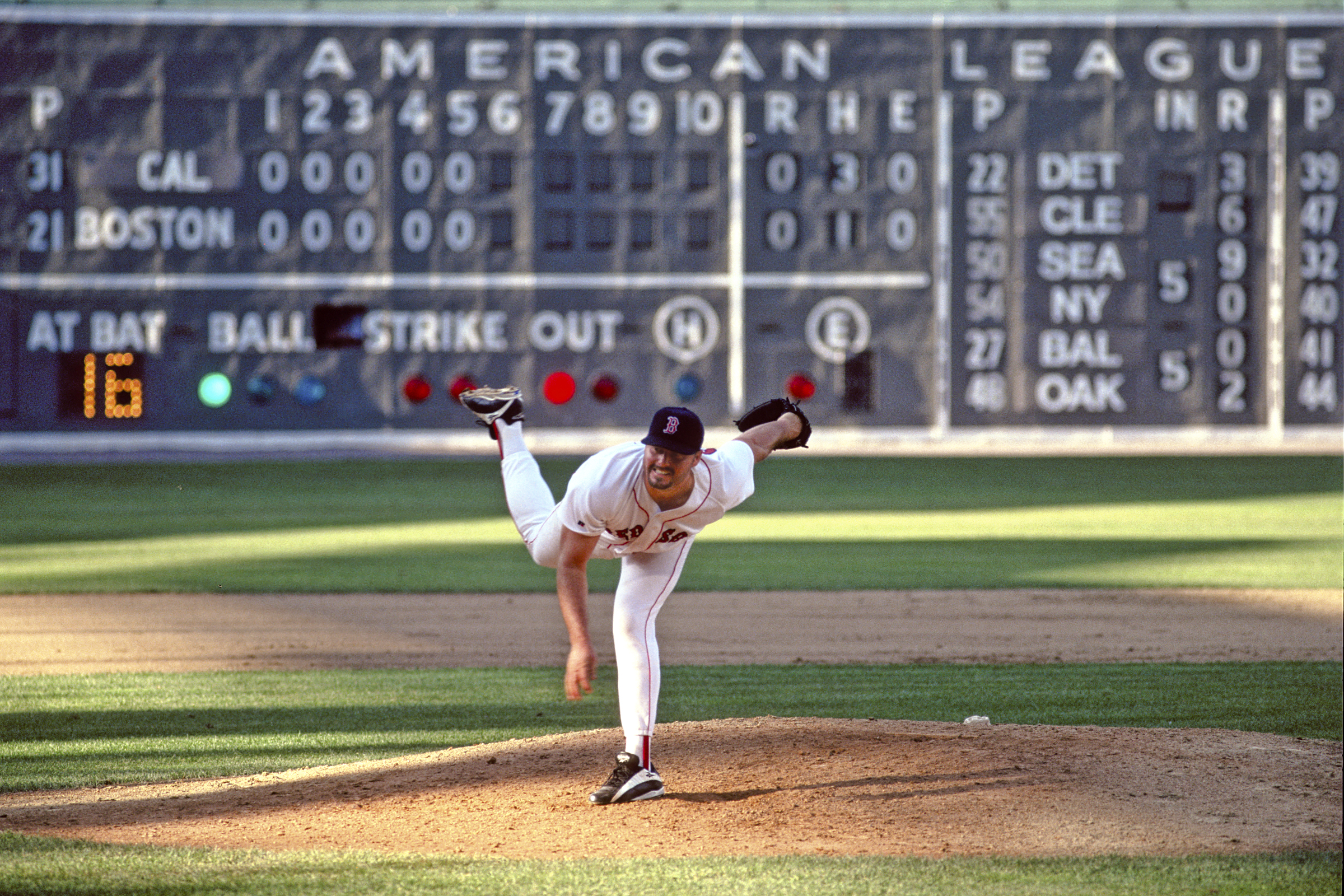
Clemens pitches at Fenway Park, 1996

The Red Sox did not re-sign Clemens following the 1996 season, despite leading the A.L. with 257 strikeouts and offering him "by far the most money ever offered to a player in the history of the Red Sox franchise." General Manager Dan Duquette remarked that he "hoped to keep him in Boston during the twilight of his career", but Clemens left and signed with the Toronto Blue Jays.

The emphasis on the misquoted 1996 "twilight" comment took on a life of its own following Clemens's post-Boston successes, and Duquette was vilified for letting the star pitcher go. Ultimately, Clemens would go on to have a record of 162–73 for the rest of his career after leaving the Red Sox. Clemens recorded 192 wins and 38 shutouts for the Red Sox, both tied with Cy Young for the franchise record and is their all-time strikeout leader with 2,590. Clemens' overall postseason record with Boston was 1–2 with a 3.88 ERA, and 45 strikeouts, and 19 walks in 56 innings. No Red Sox player has worn his uniform #21 since Clemens left the team in the 1996–97 offseason.

=== Toronto Blue Jays (1997–1998) ===
Clemens signed a four-year, $40 million deal with the Toronto Blue Jays after the 1996 season. In his first start in Fenway Park as a member of the Blue Jays, he pitched eight innings, allowing only four hits and one earned run. Sixteen of his 24 outs were strikeouts, and every batter who faced him struck out at least once. As he left the field following his last inning of work, he stared up angrily towards the owner's box.

Clemens was dominant in his two seasons with the Blue Jays, winning the pitching Triple Crown and the Cy Young Award in both seasons (1997: 21–7 record, 2.05 ERA, and 292 strikeouts; 1998: 20–6 record, 2.65 ERA, and 271 strikeouts). After the 1998 season, Clemens asked to be traded, indicating that he did not believe the Blue Jays would be competitive enough the following year and that he was dedicated to winning a championship.

=== New York Yankees (1999–2003) ===
On the first day of 1999 Spring Training, the Blue Jays traded Clemens to the New York Yankees for David Wells, Homer Bush, and Graeme Lloyd. Since his longtime uniform number #21 was in use by teammate Paul O'Neill, Clemens initially wore #12, before switching mid-season to #22.

During the 1999 regular season, Clemens posted a 14–10 record with a 4.60 ERA. He logged a pair of wins in the postseason, though he lost Game 3 of the 1999 ALCS in a matchup against Red Sox ace Pedro Martínez, which was the Yankees' only loss in the 1999 playoffs. Clemens won the Yankees' Game 4 clincher over the Atlanta Braves, giving up only one run in 7 2/3 innings.

Clemens followed up with a strong 2000 season, in which he finished with a 13–8 record with a 3.70 ERA for the regular season. Though Clemens lost two games in the ALDS against Oakland, the Yankees won the other three and thus advanced. In Game 4 of the ALCS against Seattle, Clemens set the ALCS record for strikeouts in a game when he fanned 15 batters in a one-hit shutout. In Game 2 of the 2000 World Series, Clemens pitched eight scoreless innings against the New York Mets.

In 2001, Clemens became the first pitcher in MLB history to start a season 20–1 (finishing 20–3), and won his sixth Cy Young Award. Clemens started for the Yankees in Game 7 of the 2001 World Series against the Arizona Diamondbacks, where he dueled Curt Schilling to a standstill after 6 innings, yielding only one run. The Diamondbacks went on to win the game in the 9th.

Early in 2003, Clemens announced his retirement, effective at the end of that season. On June 13, 2003, pitching against the St. Louis Cardinals in Yankee Stadium, Clemens recorded his 300th career win and 4,000th career strikeout, the only player in history to record both milestones in the same game. The 300th win came on his fourth try; the Yankee bullpen had blown his chance of a win in his previous two attempts. He became the 21st pitcher ever to record 300 wins and the third ever to record 4,000 strikeouts. His career record upon reaching the milestones was 300–155. Clemens finished the season with a 17–9 record and a 3.91 ERA.

The end of Clemens's 2003 season became a series of public farewells met with appreciative cheering. His last games in each AL park were given extra attention, particularly his final regular-season appearance in Fenway Park, when despite wearing the uniform of the hated arch-rival, he was afforded a standing ovation by Red Sox fans as he left the field. (This spectacle was repeated when the Yankees ended up playing the Red Sox in the 2003 ALCS and Clemens got a second "final start" in his original stadium.) As part of a tradition of manager Joe Torre, Clemens was chosen to manage the Yankees' last game of the regular season. Clemens made one start in the World Series against the Florida Marlins; when he left trailing 3–1 after seven innings, the Marlins left their dugout to give him a standing ovation.

=== Houston Astros (2004–2006) ===
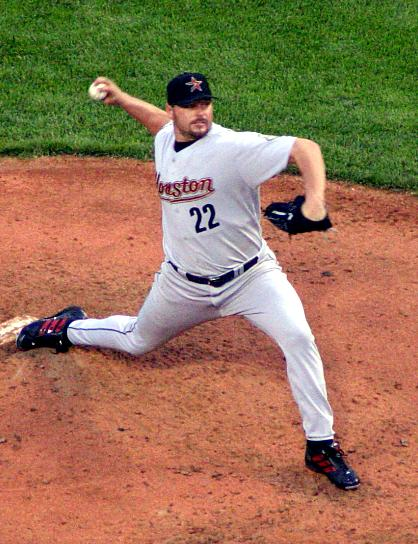
Clemens pitching for the Astros in 2004

Clemens came out of retirement, signing a one-year deal with his adopted hometown Houston Astros on January 12, 2004, joining close friend and former Yankees teammate Andy Pettitte. On May 5, 2004, Clemens recorded his 4,137th career strikeout to place him second on the all-time list behind Nolan Ryan. He was named the starter for the National League All-Star team but ultimately was the losing pitcher in that game after allowing six runs on five hits, including a three-run home run to Alfonso Soriano. Clemens finished the season with an 18–4 record, and was awarded his seventh Cy Young Award, becoming the oldest player ever to win the Cy Young at age 42. This made him one of seven pitchers to win the award in both leagues, joining Gaylord Perry, Pedro Martínez, and Randy Johnson and later joined by Roy Halladay, Max Scherzer, and Blake Snell. Clemens was the losing pitcher for the Astros in Game 7 of the 2004 NLCS against the St. Louis Cardinals, allowing four runs in six innings. Although he pitched well, he tired in the sixth inning, surrendering all four runs.

Clemens again decided to put off retirement before the 2005 season after the Astros offered salary arbitration. The Astros submitted an offer of $13.5 million, and Clemens countered with a record $22 million demand. On January 21, 2005, both sides agreed on a one-year, $18,000,022 contract, thus avoiding arbitration. The deal gave Clemens the highest yearly salary earned by a pitcher in MLB history.

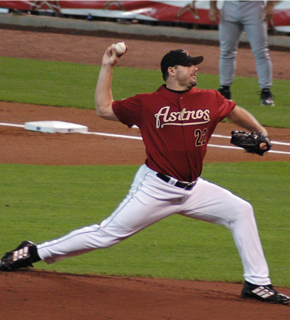
Clemens pitching for the Astros in 2005.

Clemens's 2005 season ended as one of the finest he had ever posted. His 1.87 ERA was the lowest in the major leagues, the lowest of his 22-season career, and the lowest by any National Leaguer since Greg Maddux in 1995. He finished with a 13–8 record, with his lower win total primarily due to the fact that he ranked near the bottom of the major leagues in run support. The Astros scored an average of only 3.5 runs per game in games in which he was the pitcher of record. The Astros were shut out nine times in Clemens's 32 starts, and failed to score in a 10th until after Clemens was out of the game. The Astros lost five of Clemens's starts by scores of 1–0. In April, Clemens did not allow a run in three consecutive starts. However, the Astros lost all three of those starts by a 1–0 score in extra innings.

Clemens won an emotional start on September 15, following his mother's death that morning. In his final start of the 2005 season, Clemens got his 4,500th strikeout. On October 9, 2005, Clemens made his first relief appearance since 1984, entering as a pinch hitter in the 15th, then pitching three innings to get the win as the Astros defeated the Atlanta Braves in Game 4 of the NLDS. It is the longest postseason game in MLB history at 18 innings. Clemens lasted only two innings in Game 1 of the 2005 World Series, and the Astros went on to be swept by the Chicago White Sox. It was the Astros' first World Series appearance. Clemens had aggravated a hamstring pull that had limited his performance since at least September.

Clemens said that he would retire again after the World Series but he wanted to represent the United States in the inaugural World Baseball Classic, which would be played in March 2006. He went 1–1 in the tournament, with a 2.08 ERA, striking out 10 batters in 8 2/3 innings. After pitching in a second-round loss to Mexico that eliminated the United States, Clemens began considering a return to the major leagues. On May 31, 2006, following another extended period of speculation, it was announced that Clemens was coming out of retirement for the third time to pitch for the Astros for the remainder of the 2006 season. Clemens signed a contract worth $22,000,022 (his uniform number #22). Since Clemens did not play a full season, he received a prorated percentage of that: approximately $12.25 million. Clemens made his return on June 22, 2006, against the Minnesota Twins, losing to their rookie phenom, Francisco Liriano, 4–2. For the second year in a row, his win total did not match his performance, as he finished the season with a 7–6 record, a 2.30 ERA, and a 1.04 WHIP. However, Clemens averaged just under 6 innings in his starts and never pitched into the eighth.

=== Return to the Yankees (2007) ===
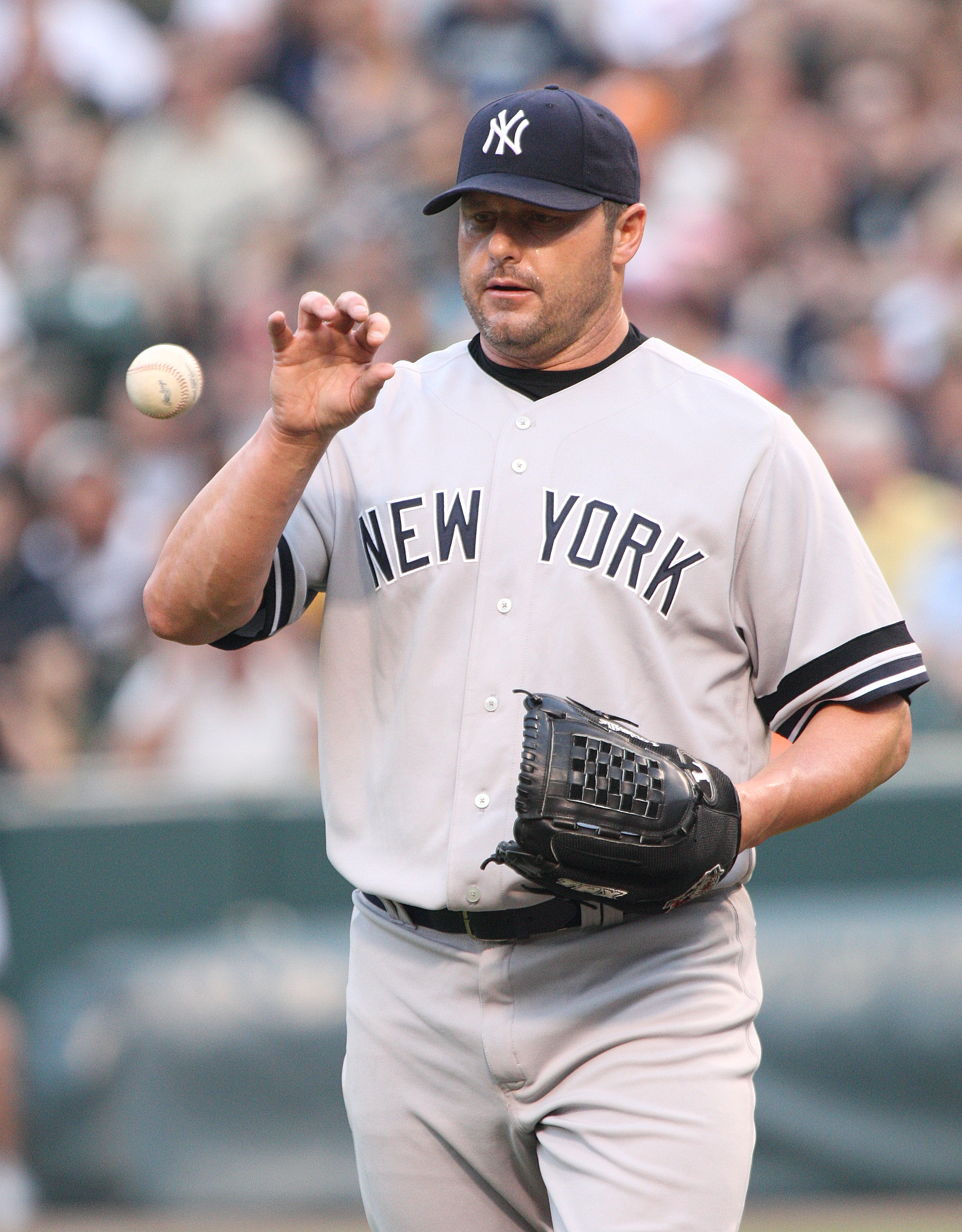
Clemens with the Yankees in 2007

Clemens unexpectedly appeared in the owner's box at Yankee Stadium on May 6, 2007, during the seventh-inning stretch of a game against the Seattle Mariners, and made a brief statement: "Thank y'all. Well they came and got me out of Texas, and uhh, I can tell you it's a privilege to be back. I'll be talkin' to y'all soon." It was simultaneously announced that Clemens had rejoined the Yankees roster, agreeing to a pro-rated one-year deal worth $28,000,022, or about $4.7 million per month. Over the contract life, he would make $18.7 million. This equated to just over $1 million per start that season.

Clemens made his 2007 return on June 9, defeating the Pittsburgh Pirates by pitching six innings with seven strikeouts and three runs allowed. On June 21, with a single in the 5th inning against the Colorado Rockies, Clemens became the oldest New York Yankee to record a hit (44 years, 321 days). On June 24, Clemens pitched an inning in relief against the San Francisco Giants. It had been 22 years and 341 days since his previous regular-season relief appearance, the longest such gap in major league history. On July 2, Clemens collected his 350th win against the Minnesota Twins at Yankee Stadium, giving up just two hits and one run over eight innings. Clemens is one of only three pitchers to pitch his entire career in the live-ball era and reach 350 wins. The other two are Warren Spahn (whose catcher for his 350th win was Joe Torre, Clemens's manager for his 350th), and Greg Maddux, who earned his 350th win in 2008. His final regular-season appearance was a start against the Red Sox at Fenway Park, in which he allowed two hits and one unearned run in six innings, and received a no-decision. Clemens finished the 2007 regular season with a record of 6–6 and a 4.18 ERA.

Clemens was forced to leave Game 3 of the 2007 ALDS in the third inning after aggravating a hamstring injury. He struck out Victor Martinez of the Cleveland Indians with his final pitch, and was replaced by right-hander Phil Hughes. Yankees manager Joe Torre removed Clemens from the roster due to his injury, and replaced him with left-hander Ron Villone. Clemens's overall postseason record with the Yankees was 7–4 with a 2.97 ERA, 98 strikeouts and 35 walks in 102 innings.

== Pitching appearances after retirement ==
On August 20, 2012, Clemens signed with the Sugar Land Skeeters of the Atlantic League of Professional Baseball. He made his debut for the Skeeters against the Bridgeport Bluefish on August 25, 2012, in front of a crowd of 7,724. It was the first time the 50-year-old had taken the mound in almost five years. Clemens pitched 3 1/3 scoreless innings and struck out two, including former major leaguers Joey Gathright and Prentice Redman. He also retired Luis Figueroa, who played briefly with the Pirates, Blue Jays and the Giants. Clemens allowed only one hit and no walks on 37 pitches in the Skeeters' 1–0 victory. Clemens made his second start for the Skeeters on September 7 against the Long Island Ducks. He pitched 4 2/3 scoreless innings, with his son, Koby, as his catcher. He retired former New York Met outfielder Timo Perez for the final out in the fourth inning, and was named the winning pitcher by the official scorer. Clemens's fastball was clocked as high as 88 mph, and the Astros sent scouts to both of his outings with the Skeeters in consideration of a possible return to the team that season.

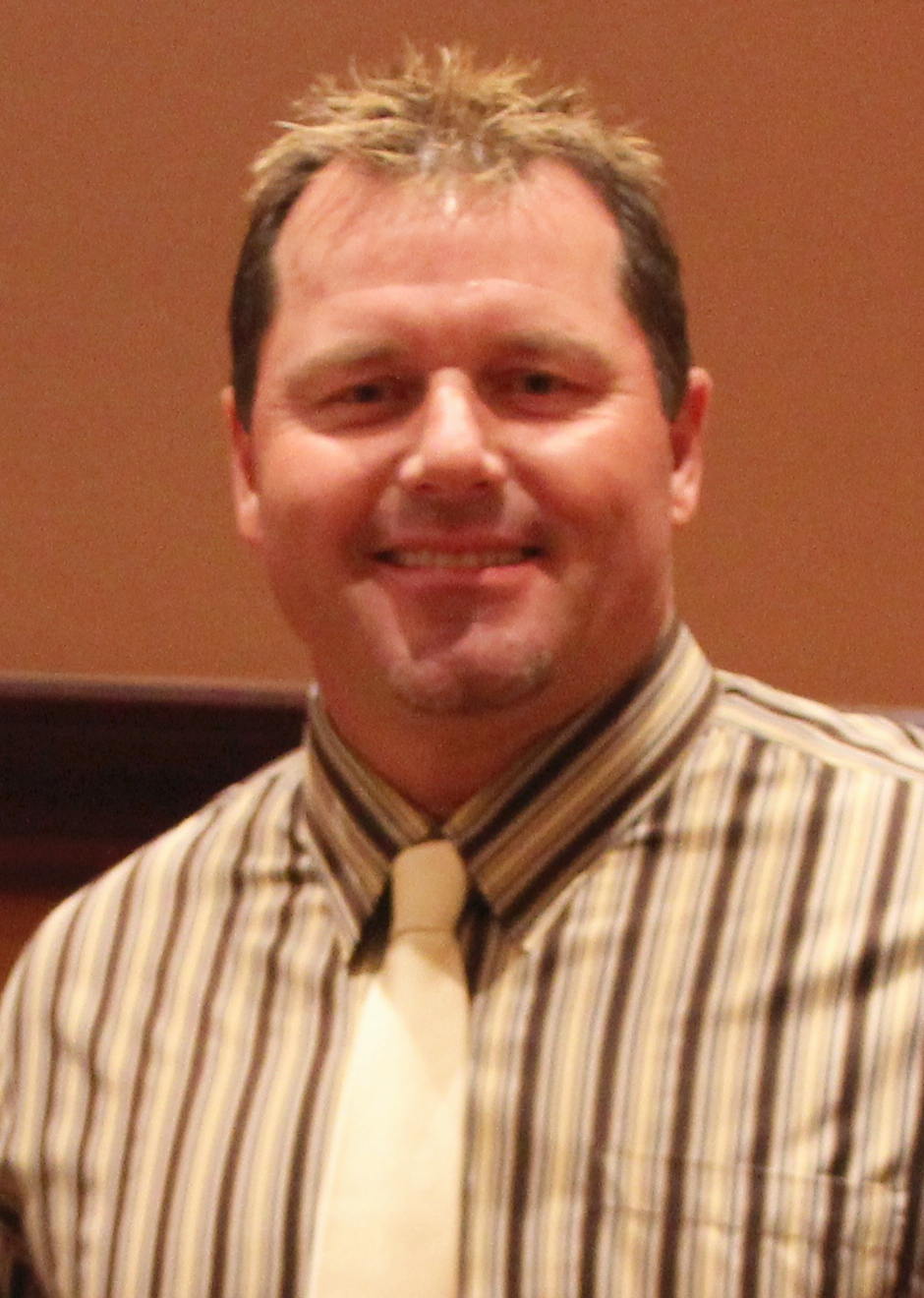
Clemens in 2012

Roger Clemens joined the Kansas Stars, a group of 24 retired major leaguers and his son Koby, to compete in the 2016 National Baseball Congress World Series. The team was put together by Kansas natives Adam LaRoche and Nate Robertson, and featured eleven former All-Stars, including Tim Hudson, Roy Oswalt, and J. D. Drew as well as Clemens. Pitching just six days after his 54th birthday, Clemens started for the Kansas Stars in a game against the NJCAA National Team on August 10, 2016. He pitched 2 2/3 innings, allowing 3 runs with one strikeout in an 11–10 loss. On August 22, 2019, Clemens wore his Red Sox uniform and pitched in the Abbot Financial Management Oldtime Baseball Game, an annual charity event held at St. Peter's Field in Cambridge, Massachusetts. The 2019 game benefitted Compassionate Care ALS, in memory of longtime Fenway Park supervisor John Welch, who died from Lou Gehrig's Disease in December 2018. Facing mostly young college players, Clemens pitched two shutout innings in the game, then moved to first base.

== National Baseball Hall of Fame consideration ==
In 2013 Baseball Hall of Fame balloting, his first year of eligibility, Clemens received 37.6% of the votes cast by the Baseball Writers' Association of America (BBWAA), falling well short of the 75% required for induction into the Hall of Fame. He has garnered more votes in subsequent elections without reaching the 75% threshold: he received 59.5% in 2019, 61.0% in 2020, and 61.6% in 2021. With the inductions of Greg Maddux and Tom Glavine in 2014 and Randy Johnson in 2015, Clemens is currently the only eligible member of the 300-win club not to be inducted into the Hall. He received 65.2% of the votes in his final year of eligibility, 2022.

Despite falling off the ballot, Clemens is still eligible for induction through the Hall of Fame's Today's Game Committee. The committee is composed of 16 members of the National Baseball Hall of Fame, executives, and veteran media members. (hence the nickname of "veterans committee") who consider retired players who lost ballot eligibility while still having made notable contributions to baseball from 1986 to 2016. The most recent voting by the committee was held in December 2022, and 12 votes were required for induction. Clemens received fewer than four votes out of sixteen cast and as a result was not selected for induction.

== Pitching style ==
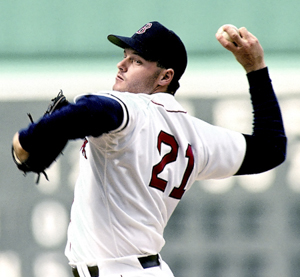
Clemens pitching in 1990

Clemens was a prototypical power pitcher with an aggressive edge, especially early in his career. Clemens was said to throw "two pitches: a 98-mph fastball and a hard breaking ball. At 23, Clemens simply reared back and threw the ball past batters." Later in his career, Clemens developed a split-finger fastball. Clemens has jocularly referred to this pitch as "Mr. Splitty".

By the time Clemens retired from Major League Baseball in 2007, his four-seam fastball had settled in the 91–94 mph range. He also threw a two-seam fastball, a slider in the mid 80s, a splitter, and an occasional curveball. Clemens was a durable pitcher, leading the American League in complete games three times and innings pitched twice. Clemens threw 18 complete games in 1987, which no pitcher has since matched. Clemens was also known as a strikeout pitcher, leading the AL in strikeouts five times and K/9 three times. He is currently the only pitcher in Major League history to have thrown two 20-strikeout games.

== Controversies ==
Clemens had the reputation of a pitcher unafraid to throw close to batters. Clemens led his league in hit batsmen only once, in 1995, but he was among the leaders in several other seasons. This tendency was more pronounced during his earlier career and subsequently tapered off. After the 2000 ALCS game against the Mariners where he knocked down future teammate Alex Rodriguez and then argued with him, Seattle Mariners manager Lou Piniella, a former Yankee, called Clemens a "headhunter." His beaning earlier that year of Mike Piazza, followed by throwing a broken bat in Piazza's direction in the 2000 World Series, cemented Clemens's surly, unapologetic image in the minds of many. In 2009, former manager Cito Gaston publicly denounced Clemens as a "double-talker" and "a complete asshole". Clemens was ranked 14th all-time in hit batsmen after the 2020 season, although not far off from other pitchers of his era at 1 hit batsmen per 125 batters faced. He had a similar rate of hit batsmen to pitchers such as Nolan Ryan, Justin Verlander, and Greg Maddux.

Clemens has attracted controversy over the years for his outspoken comments, such as his complaints about having to carry his own luggage through an airport and his criticism of Fenway Park for being a subpar facility. On April 4, 2006, Clemens made an insulting remark when asked about the devotion of Japanese and South Korean fans during the World Baseball Classic: "None of the dry cleaners were open, they were all at the game, Japan and Korea". Toward the end of his career, his annual on-and-off "retirements" revived a reputation for diva-like behavior.

Clemens has received criticism for getting special treatment from the teams that sign him. While playing for Houston, Clemens was not obliged to travel with the team on road trips if he was not pitching. His 2007 contract with the New York Yankees had a "family plan" clause that stipulated that he not be required to go on road trips in which he was not scheduled to pitch and allowed him to leave the team between starts to be with his family. These perks were publicly criticized by Yankee reliever Kyle Farnsworth. Most of Clemens's teammates, however, did not complain of such perks because of Clemens's success on the mound and valuable presence in the clubhouse. Yankee teammate Jason Giambi spoke for such players when he said, "I'd carry his bags for him, just as long as he is on the mound."

=== Steroid use accusations ===
In José Canseco's book, Juiced: Wild Times, Rampant 'Roids, Smash Hits & How Baseball Got Big, Canseco suggested that Clemens had expert knowledge about steroids and suggested that he used them, based on the improvement in his performance after leaving the Red Sox. While not addressing the allegations directly, Clemens stated: "I could care less about the rules [sic]" and "I've talked to some friends of his and I've teased them that when you're under house arrest and have ankle bracelets on, you have a lot of time to write a book."

Jason Grimsley named Clemens, as well as Andy Pettitte, as a user of performance-enhancing drugs. According to a 20-page search warrant affidavit signed by IRS Special Agent Jeff Novitzky, Grimsley told investigators he obtained amphetamines, anabolic steroids and human growth hormone from someone recommended to him by former Yankees trainer Brian McNamee. McNamee was a personal strength coach for Clemens and Pettitte, hired by Clemens in 1998. At the time of the Grimsley revelations, McNamee denied knowledge of steroid use by Clemens and Pettitte. Despite initial media reports, the affidavit made no mention of Clemens or Pettitte.

However, Clemens's name was mentioned 82 times in the Mitchell Report on steroid use in baseball. In the report, McNamee stated that during the 1998, 2000, and 2001 baseball seasons, he injected Clemens with Winstrol. Clemens's attorney Rusty Hardin denied the claims, calling McNamee "a troubled and unreliable witness" who has changed his story five times in an attempt to avoid criminal prosecution. He noted that Clemens has never tested positive in a steroid test. Former U.S. Senator George Mitchell, who prepared the report, stated that he relayed the allegations to each athlete implicated in the report and gave them a chance to respond before his findings were published.

On January 6, 2008, Clemens went on 60 Minutes to address the allegations. He told Mike Wallace that his longevity in baseball was due to "hard work" rather than illegal substances and denied all of McNamee's assertions that he injected Clemens with steroids, saying it "never happened". On January 7, Clemens filed a defamation lawsuit against McNamee, claiming that the former trainer lied after being threatened with prosecution. McNamee's attorneys argued that he was compelled to cooperate by federal officials and so his statements were protected. A federal judge agreed, throwing out all claims related to McNamee's statements to investigators on February 13, 2009, but allowing the case to proceed on statements McNamee made about Clemens to Pettitte.

On February 13, 2008, Clemens appeared before a Congressional committee, along with Brian McNamee and swore under oath that he did not take steroids, that he did not discuss HGH with McNamee, that he did not attend a party at José Canseco's where steroids were the topic of conversation, that he was only injected with B-12 and lidocaine and that he never told Pettitte he had taken HGH. This last point was in contradiction to testimony Pettitte had given under oath on February 4, 2008, wherein Pettitte said he repeated to McNamee a conversation Pettitte had with Clemens. During this conversation, Pettitte said Clemens had told him that McNamee had injected Clemens with human growth hormone. Pettitte said McNamee reacted angrily, saying that Clemens "shouldn't have done that."

The bipartisan House committee in front of which Clemens appeared, citing seven apparent inconsistencies in Clemens's testimony, recommended that the Justice Department investigate whether Clemens lied under oath about using performance-enhancing drugs. In a letter sent February 27 to Attorney General Michael Mukasey, House Oversight and Government Reform Committee chairman Henry Waxman and ranking Republican Tom Davis said Clemens's testimony that he "never used anabolic steroids or human growth hormone warrants further investigation".

As a result of the Mitchell Report, Clemens was asked to end his involvement with the Giff Nielsen Day of Golf for Kids charity tournament in Houston that he has hosted for four years. As well, his name has been removed from the Houston-based Roger Clemens Institute for Sports Medicine and will be renamed the Memorial Hermann Sports Medicine Institute.

After Washington prosecutors showed "a renewed interest in the case in the final months of 2008", a federal grand jury was convened in January 2009 to hear evidence of Clemens's possible perjury before Congress. The grand jury indicted Clemens on August 19, 2010, on charges of making false statements to Congress about his use of performance-enhancing drugs. The indictment charges Clemens with one count of obstruction of Congress, three counts of making false statements and two counts of perjury in connection with his February 2008 testimony.

His first trial began on July 13, 2011, but on the second day of testimony the judge in the case declared a mistrial over prosecutorial misconduct after prosecutors showed the jury prejudicial evidence they were not allowed to. Clemens was subsequently retried. The verdict from his second trial came in on June 18, 2012. Clemens was found not guilty on all six counts of lying to Congress in 2008, when he testified that he never took performance-enhancing drugs.

In January 2016, after Clemens once again fell short of the votes required for election into the Hall of Fame, former major-league star Roy Halladay tweeted "No Clemens no Bonds" as part of a message indicating no performance-enhancing substance users should be voted into the Hall. Clemens countered by accusing Halladay of using amphetamines during his playing career.

== Filmography ==
Clemens has appeared as himself in several movies and television episodes and has also occasionally acted in films. Perhaps best known was his appearance in the season three episode of The Simpsons ("Homer at the Bat"), in which he is recruited to the Springfield nuclear plant's softball team but is accidentally hypnotized into thinking he is a chicken; in addition to his lines, Clemens voiced his own clucking. Clemens has also made guest appearances as himself on the TV shows Hope & Faith, Spin City, Arli$$, and Saturday Night Live as well as the movie Anger Management, and makes a brief appearance in the movie Kingpin as the character Skidmark. He also is shown playing an actual game with the Houston Astros in the film Boyhood.

He appeared in the 1994 movie Cobb as an unidentified pitcher for the Philadelphia A's. In 2003, he was part of an advertising campaign for Armour hot dogs with MLB players Ken Griffey Jr., Derek Jeter, and Sammy Sosa. Since 2005, Clemens has also appeared in many commercials for Texas-based supermarket chain H-E-B. In 2007, he appeared on a baseball-themed episode of MythBusters ("Baseball Myths"). He has also starred in a commercial for Cingular parodying his return from retirement. He was calling his wife, Debra Godfrey, and a dropped call resulted in his return to the Yankees.

He released an early autobiography, Rocket Man: The Roger Clemens Story (written with Peter Gammons), in 1987. Clemens is also the spokesperson for Champion car dealerships in South Texas. In April 2009, Clemens was the subject of an unauthorized biography by Jeff Pearlman, titled The Rocket that Fell to Earth-Roger Clemens and the Rage for Baseball Immortality, that focused on his childhood and early career and accused Mike Piazza of using steroids. On May 12, Clemens broke a long silence to denounce a heavily researched exposé by four investigative reporters from the New York Daily News called American Icon: The Fall of Roger Clemens and the Rise of Steroids in America's Pastime. Clemens went on ESPN's Mike and Mike show to call the book "garbage", but a review by Michiko Kakutani of The New York Times called the book "gripping" and compared it to the work of Bob Woodward.

== Awards and recognition ==
In 1999, while many of his performances and milestones were yet to come, he ranked number 53 on The Sporting News' list of the 100 Greatest Baseball Players, and was elected by the fans to the Major League Baseball All-Century Team. In 2005, the updated Sporting News list moved Clemens up to #15.

By the end of the 2005 season, Clemens had won seven Cy Young Awards (he won the AL award in 1986, 1987, 1991, 1997, 1998, and 2001, and the National League award in 2004), an MVP and two pitching triple crowns. With his 2004 win, he joined Gaylord Perry, Randy Johnson, and Pedro Martínez as the only pitchers to win it in both leagues and became the oldest pitcher to ever win the Cy Young. He has also won the Sporting News Pitcher of the Year Award five times, was named an All-Star 11 times, and won the All-Star MVP in 1986. Clemens is the only pitcher in history to win a Cy Young Award with four different teams.

In October 2006, Clemens was named to Sports Illustrated's "all-time" team.

On August 18, 2007, Clemens got his 1,000th strikeout as a Yankee. He is only the ninth player in major league history to record 1,000 or more strikeouts with two different teams. Clemens has recorded a total of 2,590 strikeouts as a member of the Red Sox and 1,014 strikeouts as a Yankee. He also had 563 strikeouts for Toronto, and 505 strikeouts for Houston.

Clemens was inducted into the Boston Red Sox Hall of Fame in 2014, and was inducted into the Pawtucket Red Sox Hall of Fame on June 21, 2019.

On October 7, 2026 president Donald Trump announced that he would be awarding Clemens with the Presidential Medal of Freedom.

== Personal life ==
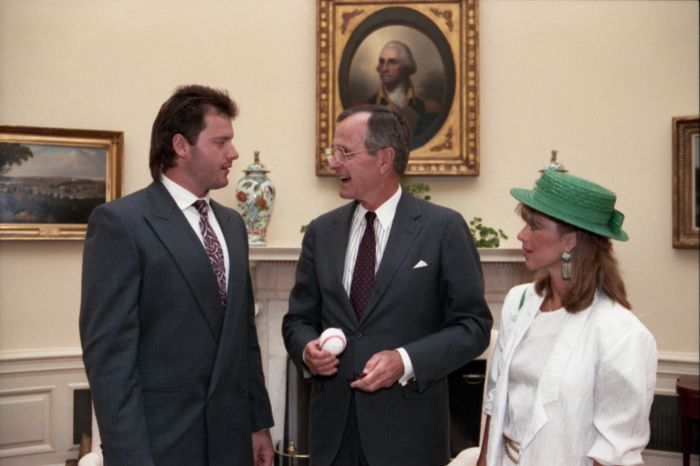
Clemens (left) with President George H. W. Bush (center) and Clemens's wife, Debra, in the Oval Office in 1989

Clemens married Debra Lynn Godfrey (born May 27, 1963) on November 24, 1984. The couple has four sons: Koby Aaron, Kory Allen, Kacy Austin, and Kody Alec—all given "K" names to honor Clemens's strikeouts ("K"s). Koby was at one time a minor league prospect for some MLB clubs. Kacy played college baseball for the Texas Longhorns. Kody also played college baseball for the Texas Longhorns and made his major league debut with the Detroit Tigers on May 31, 2022.

Debra once left a Red Sox game, when Clemens pitched for another team, in tears from the heckling she received. This is documented in an updated edition of Dan Shaughnessy's best-selling book Curse of the Bambino. Debra was quoted in the book as saying that it was the poor attitude of Red Sox fans that prevented the team from winning the World Series (this was quoted prior to the team's 2004 World Series victory).

Clemens is a member of the Republican Party and donated money to U.S. representative Ted Poe during his 2006 campaign.

Debra posed in a bikini with her husband for a Sports Illustrated pictorial regarding athletes and their wives. This appeared in the annual Sports Illustrated Swimsuit Edition for 2003. Roger wore his Yankees uniform, with the jersey open.

On February 27, 2006, to train for the World Baseball Classic, Roger pitched in an exhibition game between the Astros and his son's minor league team. In his first at-bat, Koby hit a home run off his father. In his next at-bat, Roger threw an inside pitch that almost hit Koby. Koby laughed in an interview after the game about the incident.

=== Adultery accusations ===
In April 2008, the New York Daily News reported on a possible long-term relationship between Clemens and country music singer Mindy McCready that began when she was 15 years old. Clemens's attorney Rusty Hardin denied the affair and also stated that Clemens would be bringing a defamation suit regarding this allegation. Clemens's attorney admitted that a relationship existed but described McCready as a "close family friend". He also stated that McCready had traveled on Clemens's personal jet and that Clemens's wife was aware of the relationship. However, when contacted by the Daily News, McCready said, "I cannot refute anything in the story."

On November 17, 2008, McCready spoke in more detail to Inside Edition about her affair with Clemens, saying their relationship lasted for more than a decade and that it ended when Clemens refused to leave his wife to marry her. However, she denied that she was 15 years old when it began, saying that they met when she was 16 and the affair only became sexual "several years later". In another soon-to-be-released sex tape by Vivid Entertainment, she claimed that the first time she had sex with him was when she was 21. A few days after the Daily News broke the story about the McCready relationship, they reported on another Clemens extramarital relationship, this time with Paulette Dean Daly, the now ex-wife of pro golfer John Daly. Daly declined to elaborate on the nature of her relationship with the pitcher but did not deny that it was romantic and included financial support.

There have been reports of Clemens having at least three other affairs with women. On April 29, 2008, the New York Post reported that Clemens had relationships with two or more women. One, a former bartender in Manhattan, refused comment on the story, while another, a woman from Tampa, could not be located. On May 2 of the same year, the Daily News reported a stripper in Detroit called a local radio station and said she had an affair with Clemens. He also gave tickets to baseball games, jewelry, and trips to women he was wooing.

== See also ==
- Houston Astros award winners and league leaders
- List of Boston Red Sox award winners
- List of Boston Red Sox team records
- List of Major League Baseball annual shutout leaders
- List of Major League Baseball career hit batsmen leaders
- List of Major League Baseball career wins leaders
- List of Major League Baseball players named in the Mitchell Report
- List of Major League Baseball single-game strikeout leaders
- List of people from Dayton, Ohio
- List of Toronto Blue Jays team records
- List of University of Texas at Austin alumni
- Major League Baseball titles leaders
- Toronto Blue Jays award winners and league leaders

Awards and achievements
Preceded by Hal Newhouser	American League Pitching Triple Crown; 1997 & 1998	Succeeded by Pedro Martínez
Preceded by Evander Holyfield	ESPY Award for Comeback Athlete; 1998	Succeeded by Eric Davis
Preceded by Jack Morris; David Wells	American League All-Star Game Starting Pitcher; 1986; 2001	Succeeded by Bret Saberhagen; Derek Lowe
Preceded by Jason Schmidt	National League All-Star Game Starting Pitcher; 2004	Succeeded by Chris Carpenter
Preceded by Randy Johnson	AL hits per nine innings 1994; 1998	Succeeded by Randy Johnson; Pedro Martínez
Preceded by Randy Johnson	NL hits per nine innings 2005	Succeeded by Chris Young
