= American Icon: The Fall of Roger Clemens and the Rise of Steroids in America's Pastime =

2009 book

- Author: Teri Thompson, Michael O'Keeffe, Nathaniel Vinton and Christian Red
- Language: English
- Genre: Sports
- Publisher: Alfred A. Knopf
- Publication date: May 12, 2009
- Publication place: United States
- Media type: Print
- Pages: 464 pp (hardcover)
- ISBN: 978-0-307-27180-8

American Icon: The Fall of Roger Clemens and the Rise of Steroids in America's Pastime is a book written by Teri Thompson, Michael O'Keeffe, Nathaniel Vinton and Christian Red, four sportswriters from the New York Daily News, that was released in 2009. It focuses on seven-time Cy Young Award-winning pitcher Roger Clemens' alleged use of steroids, relationship with trainer Brian McNamee, and both their testimonies in front of Congress regarding the Mitchell Report (2007). The book received a very positive review from Michiko Kakutani of The New York Times. Clemens gave a rare radio interview to ESPN's Mike and Mike in the Morning on the book's release date to combat its claims.
