= 2000 World Series =

96th edition of Major League Baseball's championship series

Team (Wins)	Managers	Season
New York Yankees (4)	Joe Torre	87–74 (.540), GA: 2 1/2
New York Mets (1)	Bobby Valentine	94–68 (.580), GB: 1
- Dates: October 21–26
- Venue(s): Yankee Stadium (New York Yankees); Shea Stadium (New York Mets)
- MVP: Derek Jeter (New York Yankees)
- Umpires: Ed Montague (crew chief), Charlie Reliford, Jeff Kellogg, Tim Welke, Tim McClelland, Jerry Crawford
- Hall of Famers: Yankees: Derek Jeter; Mariano Rivera; Joe Torre (manager); Mets: Mike Piazza

Broadcast
- Television: Fox (United States); MLB International (International)
- TV announcers: Joe Buck, Tim McCarver, and Bob Brenly (Fox); Gary Thorne and Ken Singleton (MLB International)
- Radio: ESPN; WABC (NYY); WFAN (NYM)
- Radio announcers: Jon Miller, Charley Steiner (Game 3), and Dave Campbell (ESPN); John Sterling and Michael Kay (WABC); Bob Murphy and Gary Cohen (WFAN)
- ALCS: New York Yankees over Seattle Mariners (4–2)
- NLCS: New York Mets over St. Louis Cardinals (4–1)

The 2000 World Series was the championship series of Major League Baseball's (MLB) 2000 season. The 96th edition of the World Series, it was a best-of-seven playoff between crosstown opponents, the two-time defending World Series champions and American League (AL) champion New York Yankees and the National League (NL) champion New York Mets. The Yankees defeated the Mets, four games to one, to win their third consecutive championship and 26th overall. The series was often referred to as the "Subway Series", referring to the longstanding matchup between New York baseball teams; it was the first World Series contested between two New York teams since the 1956 World Series and the first since the New York Giants and the Brooklyn Dodgers moved west to California (as the current San Francisco Giants and Los Angeles Dodgers, respectively) in 1958 and the subsequent formation of the Mets in 1962. This World Series that featured teams from the same city or state was the first of its kind since 1989, which was between the Oakland Athletics and the San Francisco Giants. Yankees shortstop Derek Jeter was named the World Series Most Valuable Player.

The Yankees advanced to the World Series by defeating the Oakland Athletics, three games to two, in the AL Division Series, and then the Seattle Mariners, four games to two, in the AL Championship Series; it was the third consecutive season the Yankees had reached the World Series, the fourth time in the past five years, and the 37th overall, making it the most of any team in MLB. The Mets advanced to the World Series by defeating the San Francisco Giants, three games to one, in the NL Division Series, and then the St. Louis Cardinals, four games to one, in the NL Championship Series; it was the team's fourth World Series appearance, making it the most of any expansion franchise in MLB and the Mets' first appearance since winning the 1986 World Series.

The Yankees were the first team in baseball to win three consecutive championships since the 1972–1974 Oakland Athletics, and the second North American professional sports team in five years to accomplish the feat after the 1996–1998 Chicago Bulls. This was the last World Series with a repeat champion until 2025, and this is the last time the Yankees won the World Series on the road. As of 2026, this remains the last World Series to feature a three-peat.

== Background ==
=== New York Yankees ===
Although the Yankees were in the midst of a dynasty and not far removed from their dominant 114-win 1998 season, the 2000 season was their weakest performance since 1995. They won just 87 games in the regular season and lost 15 of their last 18.

Nonetheless, strong seasons by Jorge Posada, Derek Jeter, Bernie Williams, and Mariano Rivera were enough to secure the AL East by 2.5 games and the third seed in the American League. In the postseason, they defeated the #2 seed Oakland Athletics in the American League Division Series 3–2 and the fourth-seeded Seattle Mariners in the American League Championship Series 4–2 to reach the World Series. At the time, they were just the fourth team since 1960 to make the World Series after winning fewer than 90 games in the regular season. (Note: The 1997 Indians won 86 games, the 1987 Twins won 85 games, and the 1973 Mets won 82 games.)

=== New York Mets ===
Highlighted by MVP-caliber seasons from Edgardo Alfonzo and Mike Piazza as well as strong pitching performances from Al Leiter and Mike Hampton, the New York Mets won 94 games in the regular season. While it wasn't enough to win the NL East from their rival in the Atlanta Braves (who had 95 wins), the Mets won the Wild Card spot by eight games. By winning the 1999 and 2000 Wild Card, the Mets achieved their first back-to-back post-season appearances in franchise history, a feat they would match in their 2015 pennant season and 2016.

The fourth-seeded Mets defeated the overall #1 seed San Francisco Giants in the NL Division Series, 3–1, and the second-seeded St. Louis Cardinals, 4–1, in the NL Championship Series. The 2000 World Series was the first World Series appearance for the Mets since their championship in 1986 and their second post-season appearance since 1988.

This series marked the second year in a row that a World Series matchup would be a repeat from the regular season. The Yankees had beaten the Mets 4–2 in six games from June 9–10 and July 7–9 (including a double header on July 8). This was also the first time a World Series champion would beat the World Series loser in both the regular season and the World Series.

== Summary ==
New York (AL) won the series, 4–1.

Game	Date	Score	Location	Time	Attendance
1	October 21	New York Mets – 3, New York Yankees – 4 (12)	Yankee Stadium	4:51	55,913
2	October 22	New York Mets – 5, New York Yankees – 6	Yankee Stadium	3:30	56,059
3	October 24	New York Yankees – 2, New York Mets – 4	Shea Stadium	3:39	55,299
4	October 25	New York Yankees – 3, New York Mets – 2	Shea Stadium	3:20	55,290
5	October 26	New York Yankees – 4, New York Mets – 2	Shea Stadium	3:32	55,292

== Matchups ==
=== Game 1 ===
October 21, 2000 8:00 pm (EDT) at Yankee Stadium in Bronx, New York 70 °F (21 °C), mostly clear
Team	1	2	3	4	5	6	7	8	9	10	11	12	R	H	E
New York (NL)	0	0	0	0	0	0	3	0	0	0	0	0	3	10	0
New York (AL)	0	0	0	0	0	2	0	0	1	0	0	1	4	12	0
WP: Mike Stanton (1–0) LP: Turk Wendell (0–1); Attendance: 55,913; Boxscore

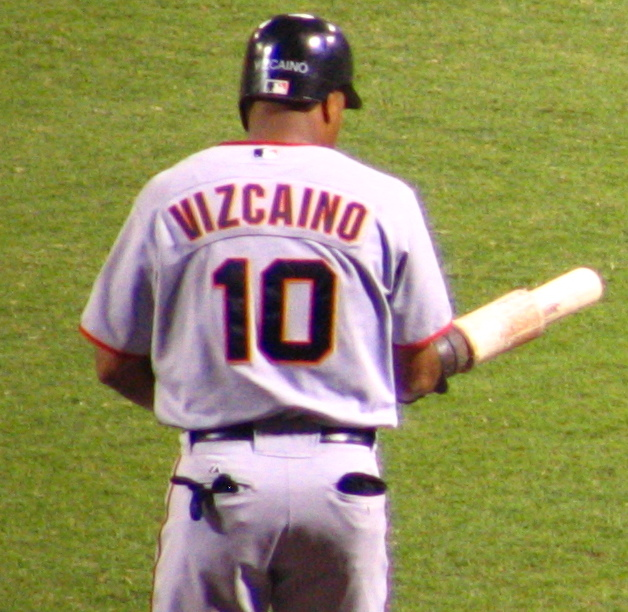
José Vizcaíno hit a walk off single in the twelfth inning to win Game 1 for the Yankees.

The American national anthem was sung by Billy Joel. The opener fell on two anniversaries. Twenty-five years prior, Boston Red Sox catcher Carlton Fisk ended Game 6 of the 1975 World Series with his famous home run off the left-field foul pole at Fenway Park to beat the Cincinnati Reds and force a Game 7. Twenty years prior, the Philadelphia Phillies won their first World Series title, defeating the Kansas City Royals in six games.

Game 1 was a match-up between postseason veterans Al Leiter and Andy Pettitte. Pettitte had been with the Yankees for each of their previous three World Series appearances to this point, while Leiter had won world championship as a member of the 1992 and 1993 Toronto Blue Jays teams and the 1997 Florida Marlins.

The two teams engaged in a scoreless tie with neither squad threatening much. Then in the sixth, with two outs and rookie Timo Perez in scoring position, Mets first baseman Todd Zeile hit a deep fly to left field. Perez misjudged the ball, thinking it was going to clear the fence, but it hit the top of the wall and bounced back into the field of play. Since it had not gone into the stands, the ball was still live and Yankees left fielder David Justice was able to relay the ball back to the infield just as Perez, who had been running at a trotting speed, was rounding third base. The relay from Derek Jeter to Jorge Posada easily beat Perez to the plate, and instead of scoring the first run of the game the Mets ended the sixth with nothing. Justice then responded in the bottom half of the inning with a double that scored Jeter and Chuck Knoblauch to give the Yankees a 2–0 lead.

In the top of the seventh inning, the Mets loaded the bases against Pettitte with one out on two singles and a walk before Bubba Trammell tied the game with a two-run single to left. After Timo Perez's sacrifice bunt moved up the runners, Jeff Nelson relieved Pettitte and allowed an RBI single to Edgardo Alfonzo to put the Mets on top. John Franco relieved Leiter in the eighth and held the Yankees in check, while Mariano Rivera staved off a rally in the top of the ninth to keep the score at 3–2.

Looking to secure the victory, the Mets called upon their closer, Armando Benítez, to finish the game. Benítez had had some trouble against the Yankees in the past, having faced them often as a member of the Baltimore Orioles, and this time would prove no different. After retiring the first batter he faced, Benitez walked Paul O'Neill. Pinch hitter Luis Polonia followed with a single, as did Jose Vizcaino, loading the bases. Knoblauch then drove in O'Neill with a sacrifice fly to tie the game. Benitez recovered to strike out Jeter for the last out, ensuring the game would require extra innings to decide.

Rivera retired the Mets in order in the tenth, and the Yankees got another chance to win the game when Justice and Bernie Williams drew walks against Dennis Cook to lead off the bottom half. Glendon Rusch then came in and threw a wild first pitch, which enabled the baserunners to advance into scoring position. Rusch then got Tino Martinez to pop out, and after walking Posada he managed to escape further damage by inducing an inning ending double play from O'Neill.

Mike Stanton, the Yankees' left-handed relief specialist, entered the game in the eleventh and set the Mets down in order again. Rusch took the mound again for the Mets and retired Luis Sojo to lead off the inning. He walked Vizcaino, then got Knoblauch to pop out. Jeter drew a walk, but ball four got away from Todd Pratt and the runners advanced to second and third. Rusch then left in favor of Turk Wendell, who retired pinch hitter Glenallen Hill on a fly ball to keep the game going.

After Stanton once again retired the side in order in the twelfth, Wendell came out to try and keep the Yankees from scoring. With one out, back to back hits by Martinez and Posada put both men in scoring position and brought O'Neill to the plate. Wendell put him on intentionally, then got Sojo to pop out to Pratt for the second out. This time, he would not get out of the inning as Vizcaino lined a single into left field to drive in Martinez to give the Yankees a 4–3 win.

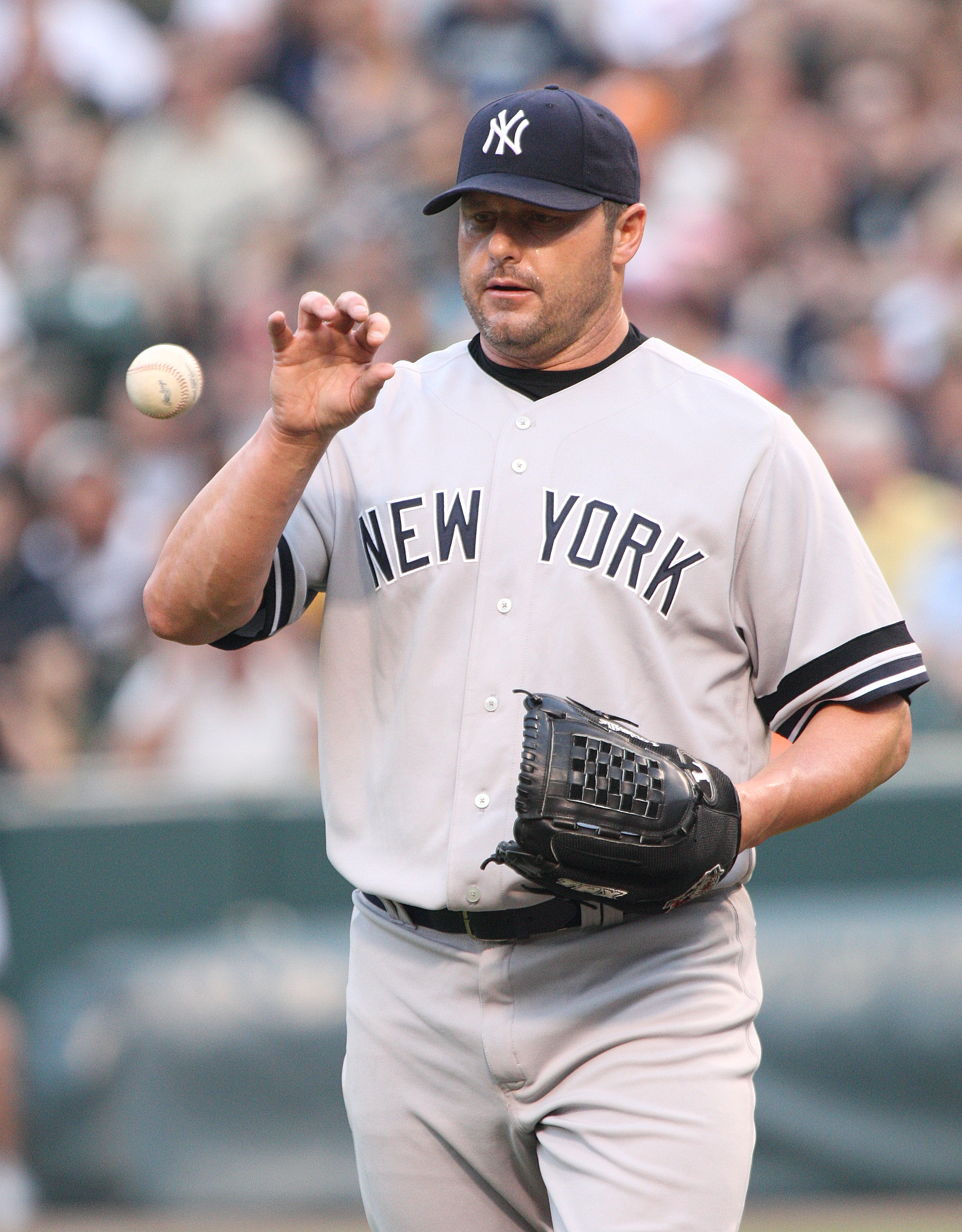
An incident early in Game 2 between starter Roger Clemens (above) and Mike Piazza (below) was one of the more noted events of the series.

=== Game 2 ===
October 22, 2000 8:00 pm (EDT) at Yankee Stadium in Bronx, New York 57 °F (14 °C), clear
Team	1	2	3	4	5	6	7	8	9	R	H	E
New York (NL)	0	0	0	0	0	0	0	0	5	5	7	3
New York (AL)	2	1	0	0	1	0	1	1	X	6	12	1
WP: Roger Clemens (1–0) LP: Mike Hampton (0–1); Home runs: NYM: Mike Piazza (1), Jay Payton (1); NYY: Scott Brosius (1); Attendance: 56,059; Boxscore

The American national anthem was sung by Robert Merrill. Roger Clemens started for the Yankees. Earlier in the year, during Interleague play, Clemens had hit Mets catcher Mike Piazza in the head with a fastball that resulted in a concussion and Piazza going on the disabled list. Early in Game 2, during Piazza's first time up, a Clemens pitch shattered Piazza's bat. The ball went foul, but a sharp edge of the bat came towards Clemens. He came off the mound and threw the bat towards the baseline, almost hitting the running Piazza. Piazza appeared baffled by Clemens' actions, but both benches cleared as a physical altercation nearly ensued. After the game, Clemens would say he did not see Piazza running and threw the bat because he was pumped up with nervous energy and initially charged the incoming broken bat, believing it to be the ball.

The Yankees struck in the bottom of the first when Mets starter Mike Hampton walked two with two outs before RBI singles by Tino Martinez and Jorge Posada put them up 2–0. Scott Brosius's leadoff home run next inning made it 3–0. Martinez doubled in the fifth and, after an intentional walk, scored on Paul O'Neill's single. In the seventh, reliever Glendon Rusch allowed a one-out single to Posada and subsequent double to O'Neill. Rick White relieved Rusch and allowed a sacrifice fly to Brosius. In the eighth, Derek Jeter doubled with one out off White, who was relieved by Dennis Cook and allowed an RBI single to Martinez. Clemens pitched eight shutout innings, allowing just two hits (both singles by Todd Zeile) while striking out nine. In the ninth, Jeff Nelson relieved Clemens and allowed a leadoff single to Edgardo Alfonzo before Piazza homered to make it 6–2. After Robin Ventura singled, Mariano Rivera relieved Nelson. He retired Zeile, allowed a single to Benny Agbayani and then, after Lenny Harris hit into a force-out at home, Jay Payton's three-run home run cut the Yankee lead to 6–5. Rivera struck out Kurt Abbott looking to end the game, and give the Yankees a 2–0 series lead heading to Shea Stadium.

The Yankees' Game 2 win tied the longest AL winning streak in the World Series at ten games (the AL had previously won ten straight 1927–29 and again 1937–40).

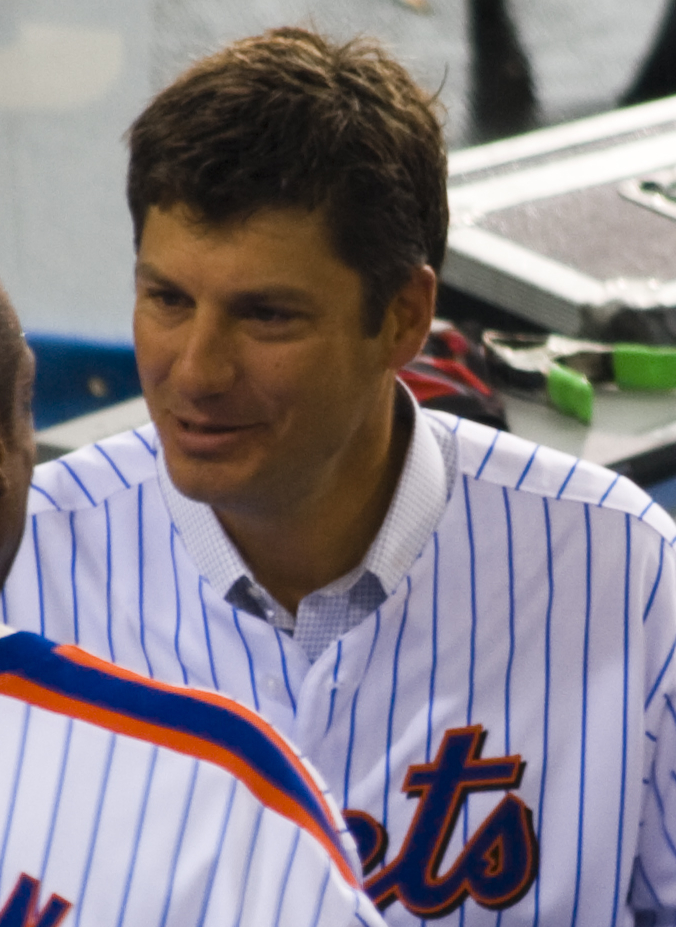
Robin Ventura hit a leadoff solo home run in Game 3.

=== Game 3 ===
October 24, 2000 8:18 pm (EDT) at Shea Stadium in Queens, New York 57 °F (14 °C), clear
Team	1	2	3	4	5	6	7	8	9	R	H	E
New York (AL)	0	0	1	1	0	0	0	0	0	2	8	0
New York (NL)	0	1	0	0	0	1	0	2	X	4	9	0
WP: John Franco (1–0) LP: Orlando Hernández (0–1) Sv: Armando Benítez (1); Home runs: NYY: None; NYM: Robin Ventura (1); Attendance: 55,299; Boxscore

The American national anthem was sung by NSYNC. In Game 3, Robin Ventura's leadoff home run in the second off Orlando Hernandez gave the Mets a 1–0 lead, but the Yankees tied it in the third when Derek Jeter singled with two outs off Rick Reed and scored on David Justice's double. Next inning, Tino Martinez hit a leadoff single and scored on Paul O'Neill's one-out triple, but the Mets tied the game in the sixth when Mike Piazza hit a leadoff double and after a walk, scored on Todd Zeile's double. In the eighth, Zeile singled with one out and scored on Benny Agbayani's double. After Jay Payton singled, Mike Stanton relieved Hernandez and allowed a sacrifice fly to Bubba Trammell to pad the Mets lead. Closer Armando Benitez pitched a scoreless ninth despite allowing a leadoff single to Chuck Knoblauch as the Mets' 4–2 win ended the Yankees' fourteen-game winning streak in World Series play dating back to Game 3 of the 1996 World Series.

Yankee hurler Orlando "El Duque" Hernandez earned the loss, snapping his previous undefeated postseason record of 6–0.

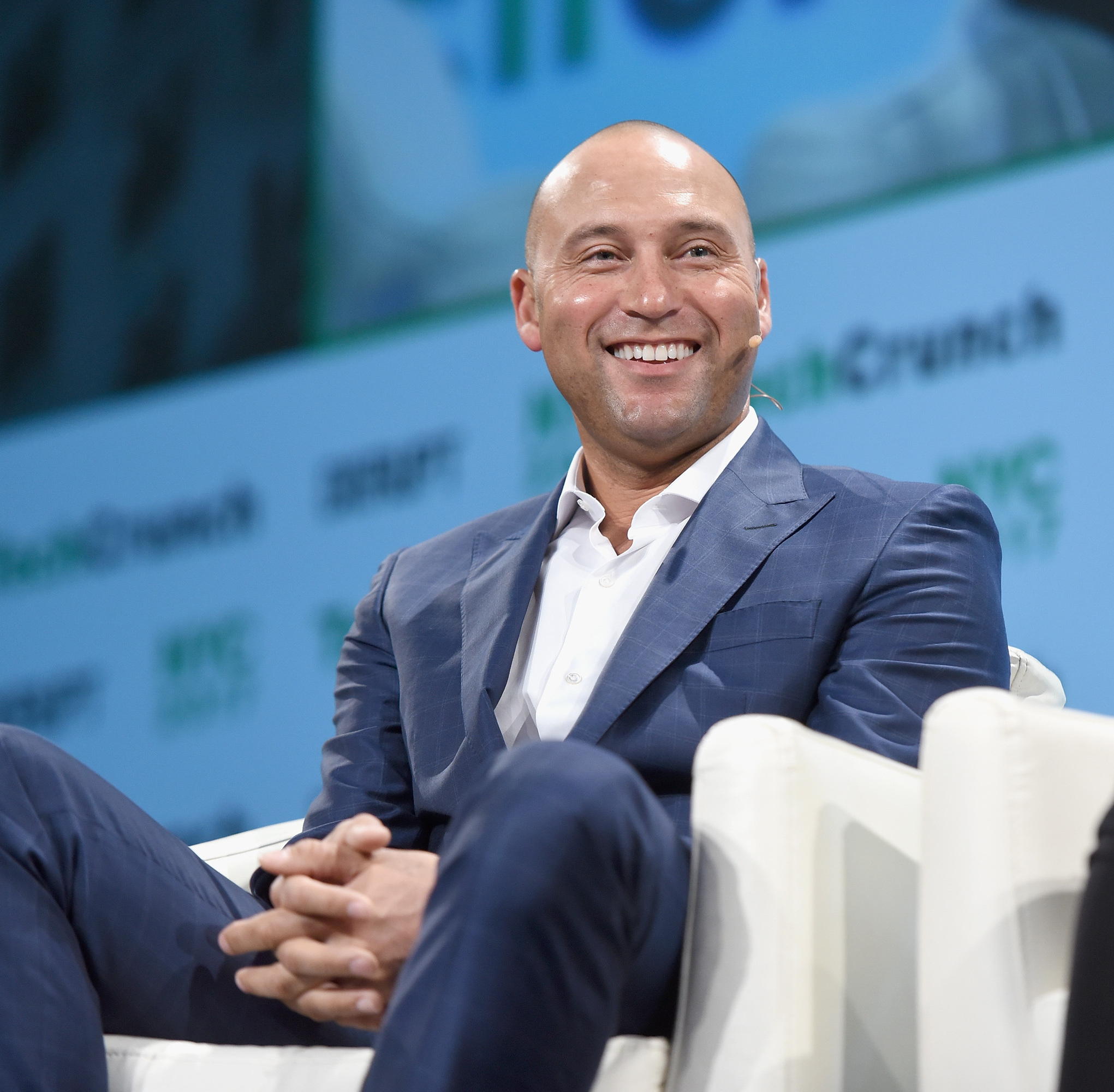
Eventual World Series MVP Derek Jeter clubbed a leadoff home run in the first inning that gave the winning margin to the Yankees.

=== Game 4 ===
October 25, 2000 8:18 pm (EDT) at Shea Stadium in Queens, New York 57 °F (14 °C), clear
Team	1	2	3	4	5	6	7	8	9	R	H	E
New York (AL)	1	1	1	0	0	0	0	0	0	3	8	0
New York (NL)	0	0	2	0	0	0	0	0	0	2	6	1
WP: Jeff Nelson (1–0) LP: Bobby Jones (0–1) Sv: Mariano Rivera (1); Home runs: NYY: Derek Jeter (1); NYM: Mike Piazza (2); Attendance: 55,290; Boxscore

The American national anthem was sung by Sheryl Crow. Before Game 4, some analysts felt the tide had changed, that the Mets (down 2–1 in the Series) were now geared with enough momentum to make a comeback. That momentum lasted only until the first pitch from Mets starter Bobby Jones, which Jeter hit far into Shea Stadium's left-field bleachers. It was the 16th leadoff homer in World Series history, also extending a 13-game hitting streak in the World Series for Jeter. The Yankees added to their lead when Paul O'Neill tripled with one out in the second and after an intentional walk, scored on Scott Brosius's sacrifice fly. In the third, Jeter hit a leadoff triple and scored on Luis Sojo's groundout. Mike Piazza's two-run home run off Denny Neagle cut the Yankees' lead to 3–2, but neither team would score after that. Jose Canseco made his only Yankees playoff appearance in the 6th inning, pinch-hitting for David Cone and striking out. The Yankees secured a dominant 3–1 lead in the Series, with elite pitchers Andy Pettitte and Roger Clemens poised for Games 5 and 6 (if necessary).

Footage of Jeter's leadoff home run is used as the background for the title screen of the YES Network series Yankeeography.

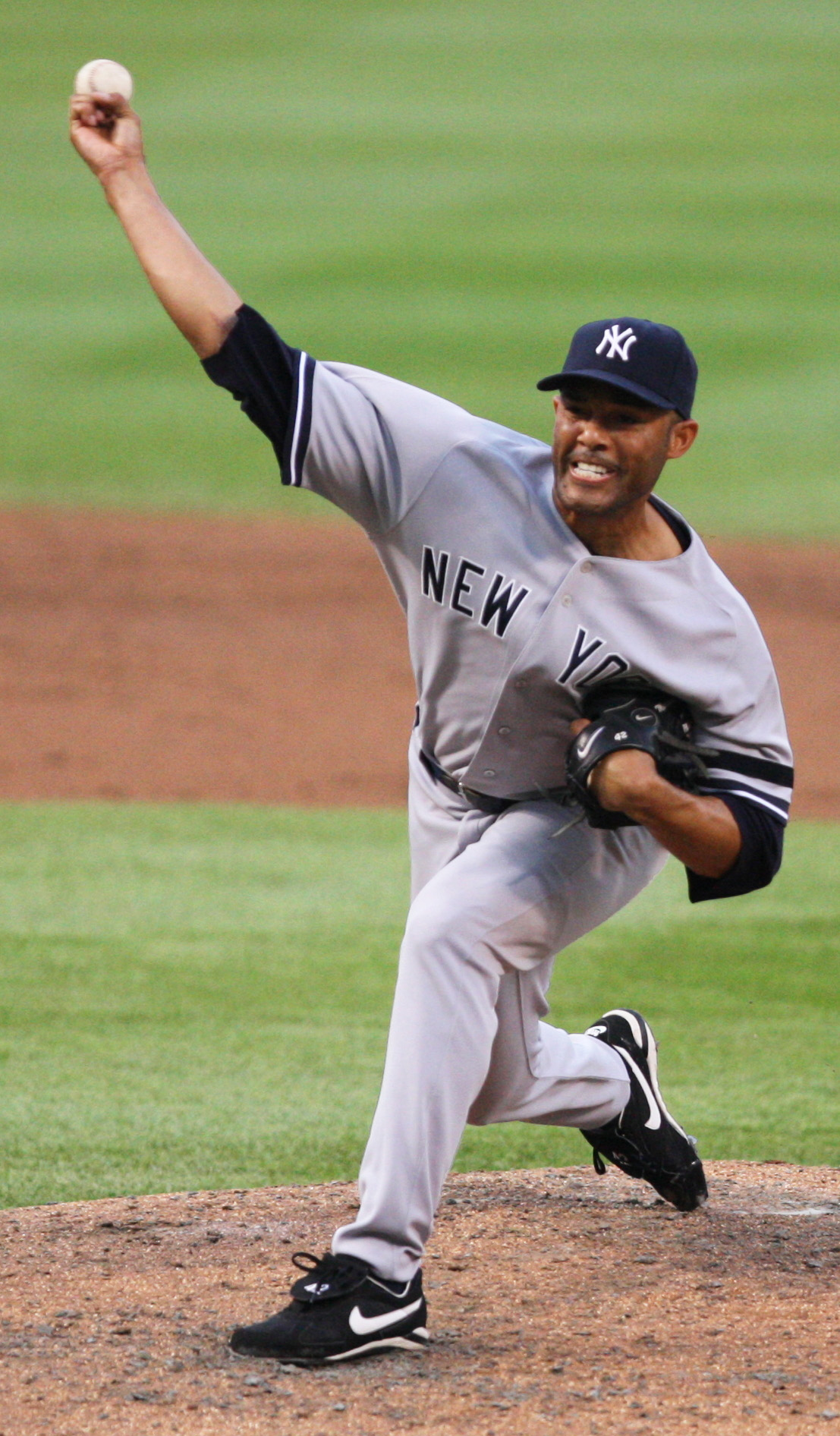
Mariano Rivera saved his second World Series game to clinch the Yankees' third straight World Series title.

=== Game 5 ===
October 26, 2000 8:18 pm (EDT) at Shea Stadium in Queens, New York 57 °F (14 °C), mostly cloudy
Team	1	2	3	4	5	6	7	8	9	R	H	E
New York (AL)	0	1	0	0	0	1	0	0	2	4	7	1
New York (NL)	0	2	0	0	0	0	0	0	0	2	8	1
WP: Mike Stanton (2–0) LP: Al Leiter (0–1) Sv: Mariano Rivera (2); Home runs: NYY: Bernie Williams (1), Derek Jeter (2); NYM: None; Attendance: 55,292; Boxscore

The American national anthem was sung by Marc Anthony. Looking to clinch, the Yankees scored first on a Bernie Williams home run in the second inning. In the bottom half, however, with runners on second and third and two outs, Andy Pettitte's fielding error on Al Leiter's bunt attempt allowed the Mets to tie the score. Benny Agbayani's RBI single then put them up 2–1. In the top of the sixth inning, Derek Jeter homered to tie the game at 2–2. Jeter's home run was the last of the 20th century.

Entering the top of the ninth, Mets ace Al Leiter had a pitch count that was approaching 140, but manager Bobby Valentine insisted that he would live or die with Leiter. After striking out Tino Martinez and Paul O'Neill, Leiter walked Jorge Posada and allowed a single to Scott Brosius. Yankees infielder Luis Sojo then hit a slow, seeing-eye single up the middle, and the throw from center fielder Jay Payton hit Posada as he was sliding into home plate. The ball went into the Yankees' dugout, allowing both Posada and Brosius to score. In the bottom of the 9th inning, Agbayani drew a one-out walk from Mariano Rivera, and was on third when Mets' slugger Mike Piazza came up to bat with two outs. On an 0–1 pitch, he hit a cutter deep to center field that many thought would be a home run. Yankees manager Joe Torre said of the last at-bat:

It was probably the most scared I've been when Mike hit that ball ... I screamed, "No!" Because any time he hits a ball in the air, it's a home run in my mind. I saw Bernie trotting over for that. I said, "Wow! I guess I misread that one."

Yankees catcher Jorge Posada similarly said, years later:

I remember it was a loud sound ... It was a pitch that got too much of the plate. It was supposed to be inside. I remember the swing, I remember Mo's reaction. And then I looked at the ball and I see Bernie running after it, and then he stopped. And I'm like, O.K., we're good.

Bernie Williams drifted back and secured the final out of the series just in front of the track. After the game, with champagne pouring over him, Williams said, "I knew right away ... I knew he didn't hit it." Likewise, Mariano Rivera in his last season (2013) was asked if he thought Piazza had hit a home run and answered, "No ... He didn't hit it with the sweet spot."

Game 5 was the final World Series game at Shea Stadium (1969, 1973, 1986 and 2000). This would also be the only time that a visiting team clinched a World Series at Shea Stadium (the Mets lost in 1973 in Oakland). This World Series provided some measure of revenge for Roger Clemens. He won the World Series in the same stadium he lost it at in 1986 while with the Yankees' fierce rival, the Boston Red Sox. Incidentally, members of the 1986 Mets World Series team threw out the ceremonial first pitch before the game.

== Composite box ==
The New York City Subway promoted rapid transit usage for the 2000 "Subway Series". The D and 4 served Yankee Stadium and the 7 served Shea Stadium.

2000 World Series (4–1): New York Yankees (A.L.) over New York Mets (N.L.)

Team	1	2	3	4	5	6	7	8	9	10	11	12	R	H	E
New York Yankees	3	3	2	1	1	3	1	1	3	0	0	1	19	47	2
New York Mets	0	3	2	0	0	1	3	2	5	0	0	0	16	40	5
Total attendance: 277,853 Average attendance: 55,571; Winning player's share: $294,783 Losing player's share: $238,654

The winning margin of three runs was the second-lowest for a five-game series; the 1915 margin was two runs, and five runs in 1933, 1942, and 1974. Later, just one run would be the difference in the 2024 World Series between the Dodgers and Yankees, a five-game series the Dodgers won.

== Aftermath ==
Artwork from the Daily News featuring Mike Piazza and Derek Jeter

2000 would be the last World Series title the Yankees would win for nine years, though they would remain competitive each year. (Note: From 2001 to 2012, the Yankees would make the playoffs every year except 2008) They lost the 2001 World Series to the Arizona Diamondbacks in a classic seven-game series after being two outs away from a fourth straight title in Game 7, and the 2003 World Series to the Florida Marlins in six games.

The 2000 World Series was the last hurrah for this Mets core that consisted of Piazza, Leiter (left 2004), Franco (left 2004), Alfonzo (left 2002), Ventura (left 2001), and manager Bobby Valentine (left 2002). After four consecutive seasons of competitive baseball, (Note: The Mets missed the post-season by 1 game in 1998, they made the NLCS in 1999, and they made the World Series in 2000) the Mets would average just 74 wins in the next four seasons, including a 95-loss season in 2003 and two last-place finishes in the NL East (2002 and 2003). After 2002, Bobby Valentine and nearly all of the coaching staff were fired, and by 2005, Mike Piazza was the only remnant from the 2000 team; he would leave the Mets after that season. The Mets would not return to the playoffs until 2006, when they lost the NLCS to the eventual champions, the St. Louis Cardinals.

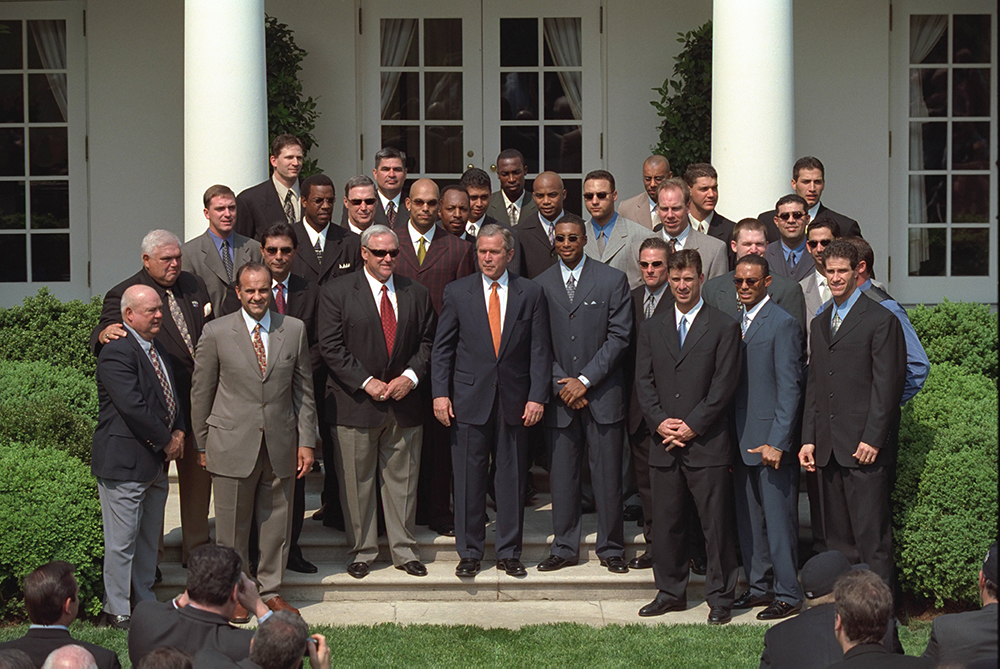
President George W. Bush with the 2000 Yankees

With the New Jersey Devils winning the 2000 Stanley Cup Final the previous spring, the New York metropolitan area was home to a World Series and Stanley Cup champion in the same season or calendar year, a distinction it previously earned in 1928 and 1939–40 when the Yankees and New York Rangers won the World Series and Stanley Cup respectively. New York missed out on a championship trifecta, however, when the NFL Giants lost Super Bowl XXXV to the Baltimore Ravens.

This was the final World Series the New York Yankees won while playing at the old Yankee Stadium (as previously mentioned, they lost in 2001 and again in 2003) and the final World Series played at Shea Stadium. Both stadiums closed at the end of the 2008 Major League Baseball season. The first season at the new Yankee Stadium (2009) ended with the Yankees winning their 27th; meanwhile, the 2015 New York Mets hosted their first-ever World Series at Citi Field, where they lost to the Kansas City Royals in five games.

Derek Jeter was the last active player involved in the 2000 World Series, as he retired following the 2014 season. However, Robin Ventura managed the White Sox from 2012 to 2016, and Joe McEwing operated in various coaching positions from 2008 to 2023, all but one year with the White Sox or their affiliates; he currently operates as special assistant to the President of Baseball Operations in the Cardinals organization.

Beginning with this World Series, the official logo would be revised annually (effective with the 2001 series) as opposed to previous World Series where the same logo would be recycled for several seasons. From 2001 to 2025, Major League Baseball was the only one of the "Big Four" leagues to change its championship tournament logos annually; the Super Bowl in the National Football League (since 2010), the Stanley Cup Final in the National Hockey League, and the NBA Finals in the National Basketball Association continue to use standardized logos with the year (or in the case of the Super Bowl, Roman numerals) updated annually. This also applied to the official logos used for the Wild Card Round (starting in 2012), Division Series and League Championship Series. From the 2025 postseason onward, MLB resumed recycling the same postseason logos from the previous year in subsequent postseasons. Meanwhile, the World Series returned to a script-based design used between 1987 and 2000, with the same design recycled for 2026.

On October 11, 2005, A&E Home Video released The New York Yankees Fall Classic Collectors Edition (1996–2001) DVD set. Game 5 of the 2000 World Series is included in the set. The entire series was released in October 2013 by Lionsgate Home Entertainment

== Records ==
- The 1998–2000 New York Yankees established a record of ten consecutive games won in consecutive World Series. The previous record was nine by the 1937–1939 Yankees. Overall, the Yankees had won 14 straight World Series games (starting with Game 3 of the 1996 World Series) breaking the mark of 12 straight by the 1927, 1928 and 1932 Yankees.
- Mariano Rivera became the first and, to date, only pitcher to record the final out in three straight World Series. In 1998, he retired the Padres' Mark Sweeney to clinch the championship; in 1999, he retired the Braves' Keith Lockhart; and in 2000, he retired the Mets' Mike Piazza.

== Radio and television ==
The World Series telecast on Fox was the first year of their exclusive coverage of the Fall Classic (although the new contract would technically begin the next year). As in previous World Series televised by Fox, Joe Buck called the play-by-play with Tim McCarver (himself a Yankees broadcaster and a former Mets broadcaster) and Bob Brenly served as color commentators, with Brenly reporting from the stands in Game 4 only. Game 5 of the series was Brenly's last broadcast for Fox, as he left to become manager of the Arizona Diamondbacks and, incidentally, go on to defeat the Yankees in the World Series the following year. Brenly returned to broadcasting in 2005 as part of the Chicago Cubs broadcasts on CSN Chicago and WGN, and also has called postseason games for TBS. In 2012, Brenly returned to the Diamondbacks as a broadcaster.

ESPN Radio's coverage was without Joe Morgan for a second consecutive year for reasons that remain unclear. Instead, Jon Miller shared the booth with Dave Campbell, ESPN Radio's Sunday Night Baseball color man. In 1999, Morgan was absent from ESPN Radio's World Series coverage because he was working the television broadcasts with Bob Costas on NBC. During Game 3, Miller was forced to leave the booth after the top of the first inning due to an upper respiratory infection. Charley Steiner, serving as a field reporter for the network, filled in on play-by-play for the rest of the game; Miller resumed his duties in Game 4 of the Series.

John Sterling and Michael Kay also broadcast this on WABC and on WFAN, Bob Murphy and Gary Cohen broadcast this series.

=== Ratings ===
The World Series drew an average of 12.4 national rating and a 21% share of the audience, down 22.5% from the previous year. The Series drew well in the New York metropolitan area, but nationally, it was, at the time, the lowest-rated World Series in history by a solid margin. Many contemporary analysts argued that the ratings slide was due to lack of interest outside of the New York City area. Others thought the ratings slide was related to the television viewing audience becoming more fragmented in the wake of cable television.

Three of the next four World Series (2001, 2003 and 2004) were all rated higher than the 2000 World Series. Following the Boston Red Sox' 86-year championship drought ending with a victory in the 2004 World Series, the event has seen a decline in ratings; every World Series from 2005 to 2013 has drawn lower ratings (sometimes substantially lower) than the 2000 Series.

Game	Ratings (households)	Share (households)	American audience (in millions)
1	11.5	22	17.56
2	12.6	20	19.05
3	12.4	21	17.45
4	12.5	21	17.61
5	13.1	21	18.93

== See also ==
- 2000 Japan Series
- Subway Series / Mets–Yankees rivalry

== Sources ==
- The subway series: the Yankees, the Mets and a season to remember. St. Louis, Mo.: The Sporting News. 2000. ISBN 0-89204-659-7.
