= Brian McNamee =

American baseball coach (born c. 1967)

- Born: c. 1967 (age 58–59); Breezy Point, Queens, New York, U.S.
- Police career
- Department: New York City Police Department (NYPD)
- Service years: 1990–1993
- Rank: Sworn in as a patrolman – 1990
- Other work: Roger Clemens' personal trainer, baseball coach

Brian Gerard McNamee (born c. 1967) is a former New York City police officer, personal trainer, and Major League Baseball strength-and-conditioning coach. He is notable for providing performance-enhancing drugs to Major League Baseball players, and also for testifying against former New York Yankees pitcher Roger Clemens at a 2008 United States Congressional hearing that concerned the veracity of the 2007 George J. Mitchell Report.

McNamee, the youngest of eight children born to John Francis McNamee (1925-2020) and Eleanor Margaret Harte (1931-2018), grew up in Breezy Point, Queens. He attended Archbishop Molloy High School. From 1986 to 1989, McNamee was a student at St. John's University in Queens. At one point he was employed at St John's University, teaching in the sports management program. McNamee falsely held himself out to be a doctor. He claimed his doctorate was from Columbus University (Louisiana).

== The Mitchell Report ==
McNamee gained notoriety following the release of Major League Baseball's Mitchell Report, which alleges that McNamee helped acquire performance-enhancing drugs including anabolic steroids, amphetamines, and human growth hormone (HGH) for some or all of the players he personally trained, who included Roger Clemens, Andy Pettitte, and Chuck Knoblauch. McNamee told the Mitchell Commission during their 20-month investigation that he began injecting Clemens with steroids during the 1998 season and that he continued to provide these steroids through 2001. Given the dominant performances produced by Clemens from that time forward, such that Clemens had become widely expected to be a future member of the National Baseball Hall of Fame, many feel that this claim constitutes the most incendiary accusation in the Mitchell Report.

On January 4, 2008, Clemens had a telephone conversation with McNamee in which Clemens stated he "just wants the truth" from someone, never actually telling his former personal trainer to come out and clear the pitcher's name. Clemens said many times in the conversation that the steroid accusations were false; McNamee never agreed or disagreed when this statement was made, simply pleading, "...tell me what you want me to do." McNamee did state, however, "It is what it is," meaning he told the truth.

Clemens filed a lawsuit against McNamee shortly before the recorded conversation for defamation of character. McNamee's attorneys argued that McNamee was compelled to cooperate by federal officials and thus his statements were protected. A federal judge agreed, throwing out all claims related to McNamee's statements to investigators on February 13, 2009, but allowing the case to proceed on statements McNamee made about Clemens to Andy Pettitte.

During the summer of 2012, in the United States District Court for the District of Columbia, McNamee took the stand as the prosecution's central witness in the perjury trial of Roger Clemens. McNamee conceded that his representations regarding Clemens had "evolved" over a period of years. Ultimately, McNamee's admitted inconsistencies resulted in the acquittal of Clemens.

== Congressional hearing ==
Both McNamee and Clemens were called to the House of Representatives Committee on Oversight and Government Reform on February 13, 2008, where both men reinforced their claims that the other was lying during the Congressional hearing. In the days leading up, McNamee claimed Clemens' wife, Debra, was also given HGH in 2003 to prepare for the upcoming Sports Illustrated swimsuit issue, which she did later confirm, but stated her husband was unaware of her using the drug. Pettitte admitted to also using HGH, obtaining it on one occasion from McNamee in 2002 and again in 2004 from his own father. Roger Clemens was found not guilty of all charges in the government's perjury case against him.

== Other ==
McNamee's relationship with Clemens was the subject of a book by four New York Daily News writers called American Icon: The Fall of Roger Clemens and the Rise of Steroids in America's Pastime (2009). Clemens broke a long-standing silence on the subject of PEDs to deny claims made in the book.
