= Timo Pérez =

Dominican baseball player (born 1975)

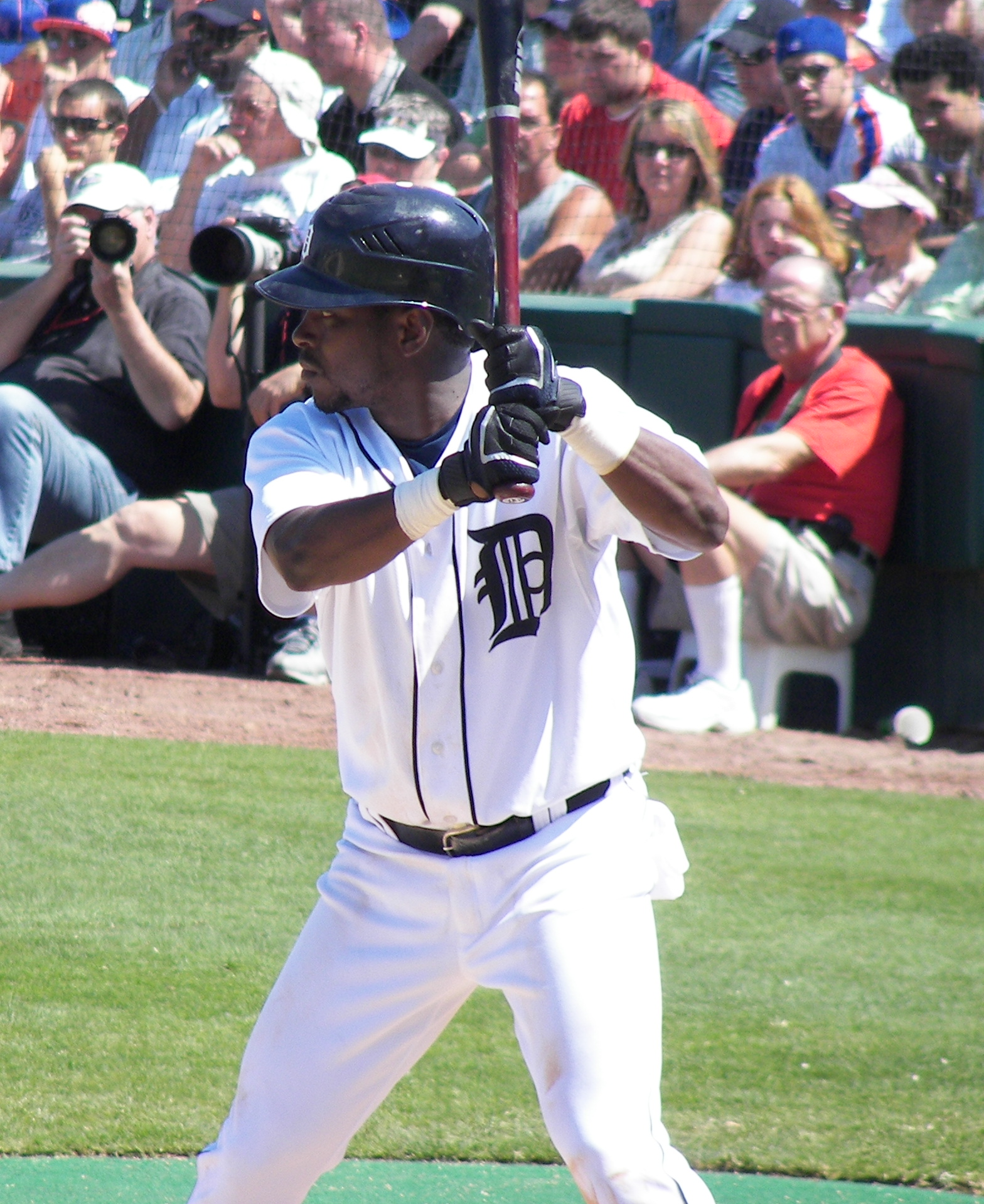
- Pérez with the Detroit Tigers
- Outfielder
- Born: April 8, 1975 (age 51); Baní, Dominican Republic
- Batted: Left Threw: Left

Professional debut
- NPB: April 5, 1996, for the Hiroshima Toyo Carp
- MLB: September 1, 2000, for the New York Mets

Last appearance
- NPB: May 3, 1999, for the Hiroshima Toyo Carp
- MLB: September 29, 2007, for the Detroit Tigers

NPB statistics
- Batting average: .271
- Home runs: 9
- Runs batted in: 59

MLB statistics
- Batting average: .269
- Home runs: 26
- Runs batted in: 185
- Stats at Baseball Reference

Teams
- Hiroshima Toyo Carp (1996–1999); New York Mets (2000–2003); Chicago White Sox (2004–2005); St. Louis Cardinals (2006); Detroit Tigers (2007)

Career highlights and awards
- World Series champion (2005)

Timoniel M. Pérez (born April 8, 1975) is a Dominican former Major League Baseball (MLB) outfielder. Between 2000 and 2007, he played for the New York Mets, Chicago White Sox, St. Louis Cardinals, and Detroit Tigers. Prior to his MLB career, Pérez spent four seasons with the Hiroshima Toyo Carp of Nippon Professional Baseball.

== Career ==
=== Hiroshima Toyo Carp ===
Pérez began his professional career by playing for the Hiroshima Toyo Carp of the Japanese Central League from 1996–1999. His best season in Japan was 1998, when he hit .296 in 98 games.

=== New York Mets ===
The New York Mets of Major League Baseball (MLB) signed Pérez as a free agent in 2000. A September 1 callup, he made his MLB debut on September 1 against the St. Louis Cardinals. He singled to center field as a pinch hitter against Cardinals reliever Dave Veres and was then thrown out trying to steal second. He hit a combined 12-for-40 in the 2000 National League Division Series and 2000 National League Championship Series.

In Game 1 of the 2000 World Series against the New York Yankees, with Pérez on first base, Todd Zeile hit a long fly ball that Pérez thought to be a home run, causing him to slow down on the basepaths. However, the ball hit the top of the outfield wall and stayed in the park. Pérez's error in judgment caused him to be thrown out at home plate trying to score on the play. Overall, he played in 5 games in the World Series for the Mets, and had two hits in 17 at-bats.

After another brief period with the Triple-A Norfolk Tides in 2001, he became a Mets regular. From 2000–2003 with the Mets, Pérez played in 372 games and hit .276 with 18 homers and 114 runs batted in.

=== Chicago White Sox ===
Pérez was traded to the Chicago White Sox of the American League during spring training in 2004, in exchange for Matt Ginter. He was the fourth outfielder on their 2005 World Series championship team, only recording one at-bat in the series. In two seasons with the White Sox, he hit .235 in 179 games.

=== St. Louis Cardinals ===
On February 10, 2006, the Cincinnati Reds signed Pérez to a minor league contract, but he was traded to the St. Louis Cardinals on April 21. Timo began his time with the Cardinals in the minor leagues and was promoted to the major league team on June 2, 2006. In his first Cardinal at bat, he was hit in the head with a pitch. He split his time between the Cardinals and the Memphis Redbirds before being designated for assignment on August 23. He played in 23 games with the Cards and hit .194.

=== Detroit Tigers ===
On January 5, 2007, Pérez signed a minor league contract with the Detroit Tigers, and was called up on July 19, 2007 to replace the injured Marcus Thames. Pérez began the season with the Triple-A Toledo Mud Hens, where his play earned him a spot on the 2007 International League All Star Team. Pérez was named MVP of the Triple-A All-Star game after going 3-4 with 2 RBI and a run scored. At the time of his callup, he was leading the league in hits, runs, and doubles, and was second in batting average. Pérez was optioned back to Toledo on July 23, 2007. Then on August 28, 2007 he was recalled when designated hitter Gary Sheffield was placed on the 15-day disabled list.

Pérez was designated for assignment on November 30, 2007. He accepted an outright assignment to the minor leagues on December 7, 2007. The Tigers re-signed him on December 11, 2007, and placed him on the 40-man roster. He played with the Toledo Mud Hens for the entire 2008 Triple-A season and became a free agent at the end of the season, but re-signed with the Tigers in January 2009.

=== 2009 ===
He was released by the Tigers in April 2009 and signed with the Rojos del Águila de Veracruz of the Mexican League He played in 77 games with them and hit .323. On August 13, 2009, Perez signed with Independent Can-Am League team New Jersey Jackals. He played in 21 games for the Jackals and hit .338.

=== Los Angeles Dodgers ===
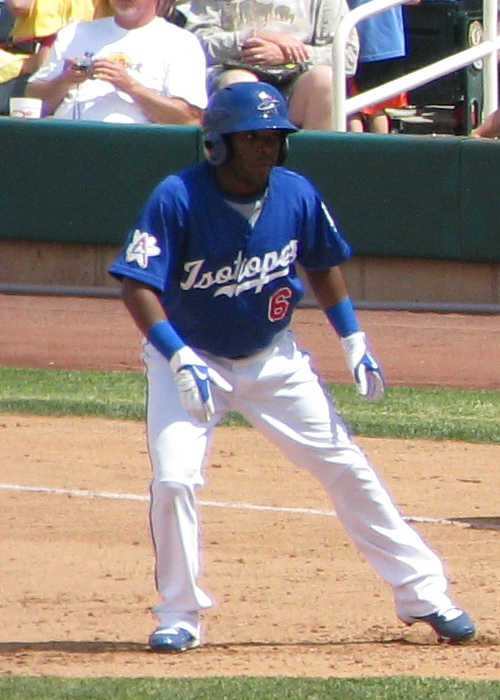
Pérez with the Albuquerque Isotopes in 2010

On January 28, 2010, Pérez signed a minor league contract with the Los Angeles Dodgers with an invite to spring training. He was assigned to the AAA Albuquerque Isotopes. On July 5, he was released from his contract.

=== Philadelphia Phillies ===
Pérez signed a minor league contract with the Philadelphia Phillies on July 22, 2010 and was assigned to their AA affiliate in Reading, Pennsylvania.

=== Back with Detroit ===
Perez went back to Detroit on another minor league contract in 2011 and played with their AAA affiliate, the Toledo Mud Hens. In 2012, he played for the Long Island Ducks of the independent Atlantic League of Professional Baseball.
