= 2000 Boston Red Sox season =

Major League Baseball season

2000 Boston Red Sox
- League: American League
- Division: East
- Ballpark: Fenway Park
- City: Boston, Massachusetts
- Record: 85–77 (.525)
- Divisional place: 2nd
- Owners: JRY Trust
- President: John Harrington
- General manager: Dan Duquette
- Manager: Jimy Williams
- Television: WFXT (Sean McDonough, Jerry Remy); NESN (Bob Kurtz, Bob Rodgers, Jerry Remy)
- Radio: WEEI (Jerry Trupiano, Joe Castiglione); WRCA (Bobby Serano Hector Martinez and J.P. Villaman)
- Stats: ESPN.com; Baseball Reference

The 2000 Boston Red Sox season was the 100th season in the franchise's Major League Baseball history. The Red Sox finished second in the American League East with a record of 85 wins and 77 losses, 2 1/2 games behind the New York Yankees, who went on to win the 2000 World Series. The Red Sox did not qualify for the postseason, as the AL wild card went to the Seattle Mariners, who had finished second in the American League West with a record of 91–71.

== Regular season ==
- Pedro Martínez became the first pitcher in Major League history to amass more than twice as many strikeouts (284) than hits allowed (128) in a season.

=== Season standings ===
AL East
Team	W	L	Pct.	GB	Home	Road
New York Yankees	87	74	.540	—	44‍–‍36	43‍–‍38
Boston Red Sox	85	77	.525	2½	42‍–‍39	43‍–‍38
Toronto Blue Jays	83	79	.512	4½	45‍–‍36	38‍–‍43
Baltimore Orioles	74	88	.457	13½	44‍–‍37	30‍–‍51
Tampa Bay Devil Rays	69	92	.429	18	36‍–‍44	33‍–‍48

=== Record vs. opponents ===
2000 American League record Source: MLB Standings Grid – 2000
Team	ANA	BAL	BOS	CWS	CLE	DET	KC	MIN	NYY	OAK	SEA	TB	TEX	TOR	NL
Anaheim	—	7–5	5–4	4–6	3–6	5–5	6–6	7–3	5–5	5–8	5–8	6–6	7–5	5–7	12–6
Baltimore	5–7	—	5–7	4–6	5–4	6–4	3–7	6–3	5–7	4–8	3–7	8–5	6–6	7–6	7–11
Boston	4–5	7–5	—	7–5	6–6	7–5	4–6	8–2	6–7	5–5	5–5	6–6	7–3	4–8	9–9
Chicago	6–4	6–4	5–7	—	8–5	9–3	5–7	7–5	8–4	6–3	7–5	6–4	5–5	5–5	12–6
Cleveland	6–3	4–5	6–6	5–8	—	6–7	5–7	5–8	5–5	6–6	7–2	8–2	6–4	8–4	13–5
Detroit	5–5	4–6	5–7	3–9	7–6	—	5–7	7–6	8–4	6–4	7–2	4–5	5–5	3–9	10–8
Kansas City	6–6	7–3	6–4	7–5	7–5	7–5	—	7–5	2–8	4–8	4–8	5–5	3–7	4–6	8–10
Minnesota	3–7	3–6	2–8	5–7	8–5	6–7	5–7	—	5–5	5–7	3–9	4–6	8–4	5–4	7–11
New York	5–5	7–5	7–6	4–8	5–5	4–8	8–2	5–5	—	6–3	4–6	6–6	10–2	5–7	11–6
Oakland	8–5	8–4	5–5	3–6	6–6	4–6	8–4	7–5	3–6	—	9–4	7–2	5–7	7–3	11–7
Seattle	8–5	7–3	5–5	5–7	2–7	2–7	8–4	9–3	6–4	4–9	—	9–3	7–5	8–2	11–7
Tampa Bay	6–6	5–8	6–6	4–6	2–8	5–4	5–5	6–4	6–6	2–7	3–9	—	5–7	5–7	9–9
Texas	5–7	6–6	3–7	5–5	4–6	5–5	7–3	4–8	2–10	7–5	5–7	7–5	—	4–6	7–11
Toronto	7–5	6–7	8–4	5–5	4–8	9–3	6–4	4–5	7–5	3–7	2–8	7–5	6–4	—	9–9

Red Sox vs. National League East
Team	ATL	FLA	MON	NYM	PHI
Boston	2–4	2–1	3–0	2–1	0–3

=== Transactions ===
- April 26, 2000: Curtis Pride was sent to the Boston Red Sox by the New York Mets as part of a conditional deal.
- June 5, 2000: Freddy Sanchez was drafted by the Boston Red Sox in the 11th round of the 2000 amateur draft. Player signed June 14, 2000.
- July 2, 2000: Hanley Ramirez was signed by the Boston Red Sox as an amateur free agent.
- July 8, 2000: Curtis Pride was released by the Boston Red Sox.
- August 3, 2000: Rico Brogna was selected off waivers by the Boston Red Sox from the Philadelphia Phillies.
- August 31, 2000: Dante Bichette was obtained by the Boston Red Sox from the Cincinnati Reds in exchange for Chris Reitsma and minor leaguer John Curtice.
- August 31, 2000: Midre Cummings was traded by the Minnesota Twins to the Boston Red Sox for Hector De Los Santos (minors).
- September 9, 2000: Lew Ford was traded by the Boston Red Sox to the Minnesota Twins for Hector Carrasco.

=== Opening Day line up ===
30	José Offerman	2B
13	John Valentin	3B
2	Carl Everett	CF
5	Nomar Garciaparra	SS
24	Mike Stanley	1B
25	Troy O'Leary	LF
6	Gary Gaetti	DH
33	Jason Varitek	C
20	Darren Lewis	RF
45	Pedro Martínez	P

=== Roster ===
2000 Boston Red Sox
Roster
Pitchers: 44 Rolando Arrojo; 47 Rod Beck; 58 Héctor Carrasco; 37 Rhéal Cormier; 63 Paxton Crawford; 55 Rich Croushore; 31 Jeff Fassero; 39 Bryce Florie; 34 Rich Garcés; 40 Sang-Hoon Lee; 32 Derek Lowe; 45 Pedro Martínez; 48 Ramón Martínez; 53 Tomo Ohka; 41 Steve Ontiveros; 38 Jesús Peña; 35 Hipólito Pichardo; 19 Brian Rose; 50 Pete Schourek; 41 Dan Smith; 26 Rob Stanifer; 49 Tim Wakefield; 46 John Wasdin; 28,59 Tim Young	Catchers: 10 Scott Hatteberg; 33 Jason Varitek; Infielders: 29 Manny Alexander; 26 Sean Berry; 11 Rico Brogna; 54 Morgan Burkhart; 23 Brian Daubach; 3 Jeff Frye; 5 Nomar Garciaparra; 3 Mike Lansing; 26 Lou Merloni; 30 José Offerman; 15 Donnie Sadler; 18 Andy Sheets; 44 Ed Sprague; 24 Mike Stanley; 13 John Valentin; 38 Wilton Veras	Outfielders: 56 Israel Alcántara; 19 Dante Bichette; 18 Midre Cummings; 2 Carl Everett; 28 Bernard Gilkey; 20 Darren Lewis; 7 Trot Nixon; 25 Troy O'Leary; 11 Curtis Pride; Other batters: 6 Gary Gaetti	Manager: 22 Jimy Williams; Coaches: 43 Buddy Bailey (Bench); 52 John Cumberland (Bullpen); 51 Tommy Harper (First base); 16 Joe Kerrigan (Pitching); 60 Dana LeVangie (Bullpen catcher); 12 Wendell Kim (Third base); 14 Jim Rice (Hitting)

== Player stats ==
= Indicates team leader

= Indicates league leader

=== Batting ===
==== Starters by position ====
Note: Pos = Position; G = Games played; AB = At bats; H = Hits; Avg. = Batting average; HR = Home runs; RBI = Runs batted in; SB = Stolen Bases

Pos	Player	G	AB	H	Avg.	HR	RBI	SB
C	Jason Varitek	139	448	111	.248	10	65	1
1B	Brian Daubach	142	495	123	.248	21	76	1
2B	Jose Offerman	116	451	115	.255	9	41	0
SS	Nomar Garciaparra	140	529	197	.372	21	96	5
3B	Wilton Veras	49	164	40	.244	0	14	0
LF	Troy O'Leary	138	513	134	.261	13	70	0
CF	Carl Everett	137	496	149	.300	34	108	11
RF	Trot Nixon	123	427	118	.276	12	60	8
DH	Dante Bichette	30	114	33	.289	7	14	0

==== Other batters ====
Note: G = Games played; AB = At bats; H = Hits; Avg. = Batting average; HR = Home runs; RBI = Runs batted in; SB = Stolen bases

Player	G	AB	H	Avg.	HR	RBI	SB
Darren Lewis	97	270	65	.241	2	17	10
Jeff Frye	69	239	69	.289	1	13	1
Scott Hatteberg	92	230	61	.265	8	36	0
Manny Alexander	101	194	41	.211	4	19	2
Mike Stanley	58	185	41	.222	10	28	0
Mike Lansing	49	139	27	.194	0	13	0
Lou Merloni	40	128	41	.320	0	18	1
Ed Sprague	33	111	24	.216	2	9	0
Donnie Sadler	49	99	22	.222	1	10	3
Bernard Gilkey	36	91	21	.231	1	9	0
Morgan Burkhart	25	73	21	.288	4	18	0
Rico Brogna	43	56	11	.196	1	8	0
Izzy Alcántara	21	45	13	.289	4	7	0
John Valentin	10	35	9	.257	2	2	0
Midre Cummings	21	25	7	.280	0	2	0
Andy Sheets	12	21	2	.095	0	1	0
Curtis Pride	9	20	5	.250	0	0	0
Gary Gaetti	5	10	0	.000	0	1	0
Sean Berry	1	4	0	.000	0	0	0

=== Pitching ===
==== Starting pitchers ====
Note: G = Games pitched; GS = Games started; IP = Innings pitched; W = Wins; L = Losses; SV = Saves; ERA = Earned run average; SO = Strikeouts

Player	G	GS	IP	W	L	ERA	SO
Pedro Martinez	29	29	217.0	18	6	1.74	284
Jeff Fassero	38	23	130.0	8	8	4.78	97
Ramon Martinez	27	27	127.2	10	8	6.13	89
Pete Schourek	21	21	107.1	3	10	5.11	63
Rolando Arrojo	13	13	71.1	5	2	5.05	44
Tomo Ohka	13	12	69.1	3	6	3.12	40

==== Relief pitchers ====
Note: G = Games pitched; IP = Innings pitched; W = Wins; L = Losses; SV = Saves; ERA = Earned run average; SO = Strikeouts

Player	G	IP	W	L	SV	ERA	SO
Derek Lowe	74	91.1	4	4	42*	2.56	79
Rich Garces	64	74.2	8	1	1	3.25	69
Rhéal Cormier	64	68.1	3	3	0	4.61	43
Hipolito Pichardo	38	65.0	6	3	1	3.46	37
Rod Beck	34	40.2	3	0	0	3.10	35
Bryce Florie	29	49.1	0	4	1	4.56	34
John Wasdin	25	44.2	1	3	1	5.04	36
Sang-hoon Lee	9	11.2	0	0	0	3.09	6
Rob Stanifer	8	13.0	0	0	0	7.62	3
Tim Young	8	7.0	0	0	0	6.43	6
Héctor Carrasco	8	6.2	1	1	0	9.45	7
Rich Croushore	5	4.2	0	1	0	5.79	3
Dan Smith	2	3.1	0	0	0	8.10	1
Jesús Peña	2	3.0	0	0	0	3.00	1

- Tied with Todd Jones (Detroit) for league lead.

==== Other pitchers ====
Note: G = Games pitched; GS = Games started; IP = Innings pitched; W = Wins; L = Losses; SV = Saves; ERA = Earned run average

Player	G	GS	IP	W	L	SV	ERA	SO
Tim Wakefield	51	17	159.1	6	10	0	5.48	102
Brian Rose	15	12	53.0	3	5	0	6.11	24
Paxton Crawford	7	4	29.0	2	1	0	3.41	17
Steve Ontiveros	3	1	5.1	1	1	0	10.13	1

== Game log ==
Red Sox Win	Red Sox Loss	Game postponed

2000 Boston Red Sox Season Game Log: 85–77 (Home: 42–39; Away: 43–38)
April: 12–9

#	Date	Opponent	Score	Win	Loss	Save	Stadium	Attendance	Record	Streak
1	April 4	@ Mariners	2–0	P. Martínez (1–0)	Moyer (0–1)	Lowe (1)	Safeco Field	45,552	1–0	W1
2	April 5	@ Mariners	3–9	García (1–0)	R. Martínez (0–1)	—	Safeco Field	29,242	1–1	L1
3	April 6	@ Mariners	2–5	Mesa (1–0)	Florie (0–1)	Sasaki (1)	Safeco Field	25,121	1–2	L2
4	April 7	@ Angels	3–7	Dickson (1–0)	Schourek (0–1)	—	Edison Field	30,412	1–3	L3
5	April 8	@ Angels	5–7	Hill (1–1)	Rose (0–1)	Percival (1)	Edison Field	27,369	1–4	L4
6	April 9	@ Angels	5–2	P. Martínez (2–0)	Bottenfield (0–1)	—	Edison Field	38,847	2–4	W1
7	April 11	Twins	13–5	R. Martínez (1–1)	Mays (0–1)	—	Fenway Park	33,114	3–4	W2
8	April 12	Twins	7–3	Fassero (1–0)	Santana (0–1)	—	Fenway Park	20,313	4–4	W2
9	April 13	Twins	4–3	Wakefield (1–0)	Wells (0–1)	Lowe (2)	Fenway Park	22,194	5–4	W4
10	April 14	Athletics	3–2	Appier (2–1)	Rose (0–2)	—	Fenway Park	29,472	5–5	L1
11	April 15	Athletics	14–2	P. Martínez (3–0)	Hudson (1–1)	—	Fenway Park	33,122	6–4	W1
12	April 16	Athletics	5–4	Lowe (1–0)	Mathews (0–1)	—	Fenway Park	32,385	7–5	W2
13	April 17	Athletics	0–1	Heredia (1–1)	Fassero (1–1)	Isringhausen (2)	Fenway Park	33,240	7–6	L1
14	April 18	@ Tigers	7–0	Schourek (1–1)	Mlicki (0–3)	Lowe (3)	Comerica Park	21,632	8–6	W1
15	April 19	@ Tigers	10–0	Rose (1–2)	Nomo (1–1)	—	Comerica Park	20,526	9–6	W2
—	April 20	@ Tigers	Postponed (rain). Makeup date September 16.							
—	April 21	Indians	Postponed (rain). Makeup date June 8.							
—	April 22	Indians	Postponed (rain). Makeup date September 20.							
—	April 23	Indians	Postponed (rain). Makeup date September 21.							
16	April 24	@ Rangers	4–5	Rogers (2–3)	Wakefield (1–1)	Wetteland (2)	The Ballpark at Arlington	26,940	9–7	L1
17	April 25	@ Rangers	6–3	P. Martínez (4–0)	Helling (2–1)	Lowe (4)	The Ballpark at Arlington	31,692	10–7	W1
18	April 26	@ Rangers	14–4	Fassero (2–1)	Clark (2–2)	—	The Ballpark at Arlington	28,698	11–7	W2
19	April 28	@ Indians	3–4	Burba (3–1)	Schourek (1–2)	Karsay (3)	Jacobs Field	42,885	11–8	L1
20	April 29	@ Indians	2–3	Finley (3–0)	R. Martínez (1–2)	Karsay (4)	Jacobs Field	42,453	11–9	L2
21	April 30	@ Indians	2–1	P. Martínez (5–0)	Nagy (1–4)	Lowe (5)	Jacobs Field	42,065	12–9	W1

May: 17–10

#	Date	Opponent	Score	Win	Loss	Save	Stadium	Attendance	Record	Streak
22	May 1	Tigers	10–6	Fassero (3–1)	Nitkowski (1–5)	—	Fenway Park	24,087	13–9	W2
23	May 2	Tigers	7–6 (12)	Blair (0–1)	Wakefield (1–2)	Jones (5)	Fenway Park	22,857	13–10	L1
24	May 3	Tigers	4–2	Lowe (2–0)	Weaver (0–4)	—	Fenway Park	27,397	14–10	W1
25	May 5	Devil Rays	5–3	R. Martínez (2–2)	Eiland (1–1)	Lowe (6)	Fenway Park	32,479	15–10	W2
26	May 6	Devil Rays	0–1	Trachsel (2–2)	P. Martínez (5–1)	—	Fenway Park	32,497	15–11	L1
27	May 7	Devil Rays	9–7	Fassero (4–1)	Rekar (0–1)	Lowe (7)	Fenway Park	32,336	16–11	W1
28	May 8	White Sox	3–2	Rose (2–2)	Sturtze (1–2)	Lowe (8)	Fenway Park	23,468	17–11	W2
29	May 9	White Sox	0–6	Baldwin (6–0)	Schourek (1–3)	—	Fenway Park	25,371	17–12	L1
30	May 10	White Sox	5–3 (6)	R. Martínez (3–2)	Eldred (2–2)	Garcés (1)	Fenway Park	28,911	18–12	W1
31	May 11	@ Orioles	11–4	Cormier (1–0)	Mercedes (2–2)	—	Camden Yards	43,619	19–12	W2
32	May 12	@ Orioles	9–0	P. Martínez (6–1)	Ponson (2–2)	—	Camden Yards	48,354	20–12	W3
33	May 13	@ Orioles	5–1	Garcés (1–0)	Trombley (2–2)	—	Camden Yards	48,579	21–12	W4
34	May 14	@ Orioles	10–1	Rose (3–2)	Mussina (1–5)	—	Camden Yards	46,107	22–12	W5
35	May 15	@ Blue Jays	8–1	Schourek (2–3)	Castillo (1–3)	—	SkyDome	16,124	23–12	W6
36	May 16	@ Blue Jays	6–7	Munro (1–0)	Lowe (2–1)	—	SkyDome	17,663	23–13	L1
37	May 17	@ Blue Jays	8–0	P. Martínez (7–1)	Carpenter (3–5)	—	SkyDome	20,078	24–13	W1
38	May 19	Tigers	3–0	Fassero (5–1)	Moehler (1–2)	Lowe (9)	Fenway Park	31,973	25–13	W2
39	May 20	Tigers	1–2	Mlicki (2–5)	Wakefield (1–3)	Jones (11)	Fenway Park	31,909	25–14	L1
40	May 21	Tigers	5–7	Nomo (2–3)	R. Martínez (3–3)	Jones (12)	Fenway Park	31,893	25–15	L2
41	May 23	Blue Jays	2–3	Carpenter (4–5)	P. Martínez (7–2)	Koch (10)	Fenway Park	33,402	25–16	L3
42	May 24	Blue Jays	6–3 (11)	Cormier (2–0)	Frascatore (0–1)	—	Fenway Park	31,250	26–16	W1
43	May 25	Blue Jays	6–11	Wells (8–2)	Schourek (2–4)	—	Fenway Park	32,716	26–17	L1
44	May 26	@ Yankees	4–1	R. Martínez (4–3)	Cone (1–4)	Lowe (10)	Yankee Stadium	54,470	27–17	W1
45	May 27	@ Yankees	3–8	Stanton (1–0)	Wasdin (0–1)	—	Yankee Stadium	55,671	27–18	L1
46	May 28	@ Yankees	2–0	P. Martínez (8–2)	Clemens (4–5)	—	Yankee Stadium	55,339	28–18	W1
47	May 30	Royals	8–2	Fassero (6–1)	Suppan (2–5)	—	Fenway Park	31,861	29–18	W2
48	May 31	Royals	7–9	Suzuki (2–0)	Schourek (2–5)	Spradlin (5)	Fenway Park	32,503	29–19	L1

June: 9–18

#	Date	Opponent	Score	Win	Loss	Save	Stadium	Attendance	Record	Streak
49	June 1	Royals	11–13	Santiago (5–2)	Lowe (2–2)	Reichert (1)	Fenway Park	32,661	29–20	L2
50	June 2	@ Phillies	1–2 (11)	Brantley (1–0)	Wasdin (0–2)	—	Veterans Stadium	22,194	29–21	L3
51	June 3	@ Phillies	3–9	Wolf (5–4)	Wakefield (1–4)	—	Veterans Stadium	31,131	29–22	L4
52	June 4	@ Phillies	5–6 (12)	Schrenk (2–1)	Cormier (2–1)	—	Veterans Stadium	27,382	29–23	L5
53	June 5	@ Marlins	3–2	Wakefield (2–4)	Bones (1–1)	Lowe (11)	Pro Player Stadium	12,523	30–23	W1
54	June 6	@ Marlins	4–3	R. Martínez (5–3)	Sánchez (4–5)	Lowe (12)	Pro Player Stadium	14,225	31–23	W2
55	June 7	@ Marlins	2–6	Darensbourg (2–0)	Rose (3–3)	—	Pro Player Stadium	17,088	31–24	L1
56	June 8	Indians	3–0	P. Martínez (9–2)	Colón (6–3)	Lowe (13)	Fenway Park	31,438	32–24	W1
57	June 9	@ Braves	4–6	Maddux (8–1)	Fassero (6–2)	Seánez (2)	Turner Field	48,053	32–25	L1
58	June 10	@ Braves	0–6	Mulholland (6–5)	Schourek (2–6)	—	Turner Field	49,420	32–26	L2
59	June 11	@ Braves	5–3	Garcés (2–0)	Seánez (2–4)	Lowe (14)	Turner Field	47,437	33–26	W1
—	June 12	@ Yankees	Postponed (rain). Makeup date September 11.							
60	June 13	@ Yankees	5–3	Pichardo (1–0)	Hernández (6–5)	Lowe (15)	Yankee Stadium	52,142	34–26	W2
61	June 14	@ Yankees	1–2	Grimsley (3–1)	Wakefield (2–5)	Rivera (15)	Yankee Stadium	54,834	34–27	L1
62	June 16	Blue Jays	7–4	Pichardo (2–0)	Escobar (5–8)	Lowe (16)	Fenway Park	33,638	35–27	W1
63	June 17	Blue Jays	10–11	Wells (11–2)	R. Martínez (5–4)	Koch (14)	Fenway Park	32,951	35–28	L1
64	June 18	Blue Jays	1–5	Castillo (3–5)	Fassero (6–3)	Koch (15)	Fenway Park	32,925	35–29	L2
65	June 19	Yankees	22–1	Mendoza (6–3)	Rose (3–4)	—	Fenway Park	33,370	35–30	L3
66	June 20	Yankees	3–0	Pettitte (7–3)	P. Martínez (9–3)	Rivera (16)	Fenway Park	33,909	35–31	L4
67	June 21	Yankees	9–7	Garcés (3–0)	Grimsley (3–2)	—	Fenway Park	32,958	36–31	W1
68	June 22	Yankees	4–2	R. Martínez (6–4)	Westbrook (0–2)	Lowe (17)	Fenway Park	33,774	37–31	W2
69	June 23	@ Blue Jays	4–5	Castillo (4–5)	Wasdin (0–3)	Koch (16)	SkyDome	28,198	37–32	L1
70	June 24	@ Blue Jays	4–6	Halladay (3–4)	Rose (3–5)	Koch (17)	SkyDome	30,130	37–33	L2
71	June 25	@ Blue Jays	5–6 (13)	DeWitt (1–0)	Florie (0–2)	—	SkyDome	31,022	37–34	L3
72	June 27	Orioles	3–6 (10)	Trombley (3–2)	Lowe (2–3)	—	Fenway Park	32,813	37–35	L4
73	June 28	Orioles	7–8 (11)	Mercedes (3–3)	Florie (0–3)	Groom (4)	Fenway Park	33,834	37–36	L5
74	June 29	Orioles	12–4	Wakefield (3–5)	Erickson (3–6)	—	Fenway Park	33,612	38–36	W1
75	June 30	@ White Sox	4–10	Parque (8–2)	Pichardo (2–1)	—	Comiskey Park	32,157	38–37	L1

July: 16–11

#	Date	Opponent	Score	Win	Loss	Save	Stadium	Attendance	Record	Streak
76	July 1	@ White Sox	2–7	Sirotka (8–6)	Crawford (0–1)	—	Comiskey Park	28,006	38–38	L2
77	July 2	@ White Sox	2–8	Baldwin (11–3)	Schourek (2–7)	—	Comiskey Park	32,934	38–39	L3
78	July 3	@ Twins	11–8	Pichardo (3–1)	Lincoln (0–2)	Lowe (18)	Metrodome	13,128	39–39	W1
79	July 4	@ Twins	14–4	Wakefield (4–5)	Milton (8–3)	Florie (1)	Metrodome	9,209	40–39	W2
80	July 5	@ Twins	11–8	Wasdin (1–3)	Redman (5–4)	Lowe (19)	Metrodome	8,488	41–39	W3
81	July 6	@ Twins	8–7	Crawford (1–1)	Radke (5–10)	—	Metrodome	10,326	42–39	W4
82	July 7	Braves	3–5	Glavine (9–5)	Schourek (2–8)	Ligtenberg (7)	Fenway Park	33,686	42–40	L1
83	July 8	Braves	1–5	Mulholland (9–8)	R. Martínez (6–5)	—	Fenway Park	33,311	42–41	L2
84	July 9	Braves	7–2	Wakefield (5–5)	Millwood (5–8)	—	Fenway Park	33,018	43–41	W1
85	July 13	Mets	4–3	Garcés (4–0)	Benítez (2–4)	—	Fenway Park	33,894	44–41	W2
86	July 14	Mets	4–6	Mahomes (3–1)	Lowe (2–4)	Benítez (20)	Fenway Park	33,293	44–42	L1
87	July 15	Mets	6–4	R. Martínez (7–5)	Hampton (9–6)	Lowe (20)	Fenway Park	33,213	45–42	W1
88	July 16	Expos	5–2	Wakefield (6–5)	Johnson (4–4)	Wasdin (1)	Fenway Park	32,164	46–42	W2
89	July 17	Expos	7–3	Pichardo (4–1)	Telford (5–4)	—	Fenway Park	32,703	47–42	W3
90	July 18	Expos	3–1	P. Martínez (10–3)	Vázquez (7–5)	Lowe (21)	Fenway Park	32,329	48–42	W4
—	July 19	@ Orioles	Postponed (rain). Makeup date July 20.							
91	July 20 (1)	@ Orioles	11–7	R. Martínez (8–5)	Ponson (5–6)	—	Camden Yards	42,048	49–42	W5
92	July 20 (2)	@ Orioles	4–9	Erickson (5–7)	Schourek (2–9)	—	Camden Yards	46,167	49–43	L1
93	July 21	White Sox	5–8	Simas (2–2)	Pichardo (4–2)	Howry (5)	Fenway Park	33,869	49–44	L2
94	July 22	White Sox	8–6	Fassero (7–3)	Garland (1–2)	—	Fenway Park	33,384	50–44	W1
95	July 23	White Sox	1–0	P. Martínez (11–3)	Sirotka (9–8)	—	Fenway Park	33,224	51–44	W2
96	July 24	Twins	2–4	Milton (9–6)	Ohka (0–1)	—	Fenway Park	33,469	51–45	L1
97	July 25	Twins	2–4	Mays (6–11)	R. Martínez (8–6)	Guardado (6)	Fenway Park	33,668	51–46	L2
—	July 26	Twins	Postponed (rain). Makeup date September 7.							
98	July 27	@ Athletics	5–4 (10)	Garcés (5–0)	Tam (3–3)	Lowe (22)	Network Associates Coliseum	19,343	52–46	W1
99	July 28	@ Athletics	4–1	P. Martínez (12–3)	Mulder (6–7)	Lowe (23)	Network Associates Coliseum	28,072	53–46	W2
100	July 29	@ Athletics	1–12	Appier (9–8)	Fassero (7–4)	—	Network Associates Coliseum	36,325	53–47	L1
101	July 30	@ Athletics	2–5	Heredia (13–7)	Arrojo (5–10)	Isringhausen (23)	Network Associates Coliseum	29,847	53–48	L2
102	July 31	@ Mariners	8–5	Garcés (6–0)	Mesa (3–6)	Pichardo (1)	Safeco Field	36,993	54–48	W1

August: 15–13

#	Date	Opponent	Score	Win	Loss	Save	Stadium	Attendance	Record	Streak
103	August 1	@ Mariners	4–5 (19)	Sasaki (2–5)	Fassero (7–5)	—	Safeco Field	37,391	54–49	L1
104	August 2	@ Mariners	5–2	P. Martínez (13–3)	García (3–2)	—	Safeco Field	45,121	55–49	W1
105	August 4	Royals	5–4	Garcés (7–0)	Larkin (0–1)	Lowe (24)	Fenway Park	33,702	56–49	W2
106	August 5	Royals	5–7	Meadows (8–8)	Cormier (2–2)	Bottalico (10)	Fenway Park	31,441	56–50	L1
107	August 6	Royals	1–3	Reichert (5–6)	Wakefield (6–6)	Bottalico (11)	Fenway Park	33,442	56–51	L2
108	August 7	@ Angels	1–4	Washburn (7–2)	Ohka (0–2)	Hasegawa (4)	Edison Field	23,078	56–52	L3
109	August 8	@ Angels	1–2	Ortiz (4–2)	P. Martínez (13–4)	—	Edison Field	27,293	56–53	L4
110	August 9	@ Angels	4–2	Fassero (8–5)	Wise (0–1)	Lowe (25)	Edison Field	25,334	57–53	W1
111	August 11	@ Rangers	7–3	Arrojo (6–10)	Glynn (3–2)	—	The Ballpark at Arlington	39,991	58–53	W2
112	August 12	@ Rangers	3–6	Helling (14–8)	Wakefield (6–7)	—	The Ballpark at Arlington	43,822	58–54	L1
113	August 13	@ Rangers	4–2	Ohka (1–2)	Rogers (11–10)	Lowe (26)	The Ballpark at Arlington	28,927	59–54	W1
114	August 14	Devil Rays	7–3	Lowe (3–4)	Taylor (1–2)	—	Fenway Park	32,174	60–54	W1
115	August 15	Devil Rays	1–3	Sturtze (4–2)	Fassero (8–6)	Hernández (22)	Fenway Park	33,015	60–55	L1
116	August 16	Devil Rays	4–3	Arrojo (7–10)	Wilson (0–2)	Lowe (27)	Fenway Park	31,467	61–55	W1
117	August 17	Rangers	8–7	Garcés (8–0)	Wetteland (4–5)	—	Fenway Park	33,510	62–55	W2
118	August 18	Rangers	6–4	Ohka (2–2)	Rogers (11–11)	Lowe (28)	Fenway Park	33,009	63–55	W3
119	August 19	Rangers	9–0	P. Martínez (14–4)	Perisho (2–6)	—	Fenway Park	33,222	64–55	W4
120	August 20	Rangers	2–6	Davis (5–4)	Fassero (8–7)	—	Fenway Park	32,467	64–56	L1
121	August 21	Angels	7–6 (11)	Lowe (4–4)	Holtz (1–3)	—	Fenway Park	32,795	65–56	W1
122	August 22	Angels	4–11	Mercker (1–2)	Wakefield (6–8)	—	Fenway Park	33,163	65–57	L1
123	August 23	Angels	3–1	Ohka (3–2)	Ortiz (4–4)	Lowe (29)	Fenway Park	32,958	66–57	W1
124	August 24	@ Royals	9–7 (10)	Pichardo (5–2)	Larkin (0–2)	Lowe (30)	Kauffman Stadium	18,928	67–57	W2
125	August 25	@ Royals	2–6	Suppan (7–7)	Florie (0–4)	—	Kauffman Stadium	20,028	67–58	L1
126	August 26	@ Royals	5–3	Arrojo (8–10)	Meadows (9–10)	Lowe (31)	Kauffman Stadium	30,199	68–58	W1
127	August 27	@ Royals	7–11	Reichert (8–6)	Wakefield (6–9)	—	Kauffman Stadium	17,037	68–59	L1
128	August 28	@ Devil Rays	2–5	Rekar (5–9)	Pichardo (5–3)	Hernández (26)	Tropicana Field	17,721	68–60	L2
129	August 29	@ Devil Rays	8–0	P. Martínez (15–4)	Eiland (2–2)	—	Tropicana Field	17,450	69–60	W1
130	August 30	@ Devil Rays	1–3	Lopez (11–9)	Fassero (8–8)	Hernández (27)	Tropicana Field	15,043	69–61	L1

September / October: 16–16

#	Date	Opponent	Score	Win	Loss	Save	Stadium	Attendance	Record	Streak
131	September 1	Mariners	6–2	Arrojo (9–10)	Halama (11–7)	—	Fenway Park	33,021	70–61	W1
132	September 2	Mariners	1–4	García (5–4)	Garcés (8–1)	Sasaki (31)	Fenway Park	31,830	70–62	L1
133	September 3	Mariners	0–5	Abbott (9–5)	Ohka (3–3)	Paniagua (4)	Fenway Park	32,668	70–63	L2
134	September 4	Mariners	5–1	P. Martínez (16–4)	Moyer (11–9)	—	Fenway Park	32,619	71–63	W1
135	September 5	Athletics	10–3	Schourek (3–9)	Appier (12–11)	—	Fenway Park	31,825	72–63	W2
136	September 6	Athletics	4–6	Mulder (8–10)	Arrojo (9–11)	Mecir (5)	Fenway Park	31,262	72–64	L1
137	September 7	Twins	11–6	R. Martínez (9–6)	Milton (12–9)	—	Fenway Park	32,283	73–64	W1
138	September 8	Yankees	0–4	Clemens (12–6)	Ohka (3–4)	—	Fenway Park	33,861	73–65	L1
139	September 9	Yankees	3–5	Pettitte (18–7)	P. Martínez (16–5)	—	Fenway Park	33,355	73–66	L2
140	September 10	Yankees	2–6	Keisler (1–0)	Schourek (3–10)	Gooden (2)	Fenway Park	33,062	73–67	L3
141	September 11	@ Yankees	4–0	Arrojo (10–11)	Hernández (11–11)	Lowe (32)	Yankee Stadium	40,326	74–67	W1
142	September 12	@ Indians	8–6	R. Martínez (10–6)	Finley (12–11)	Lowe (33)	Jacobs Field	42,714	75–67	W2
143	September 13	@ Indians	3–10	Colón (13–8)	Ohka (3–5)	—	Jacobs Field	42,667	75–68	L1
144	September 14	@ Indians	7–4	P. Martínez (17–5)	Nagy (2–5)	Lowe (34)	Jacobs Field	42,709	76–68	W1
145	September 15	@ Tigers	7–6	Beck (1–0)	Cruz (5–2)	Lowe (35)	Comerica Park	33,785	77–68	W2
146	September 16 (1)	@ Tigers	8–5	Pichardo (6–3)	Anderson (3–2)	Lowe (36)	Comerica Park	32,882	78–68	W3
147	September 16 (2)	@ Tigers	2–12	Nomo (7–11)	Ontiveros (0–1)	—	Comerica Park	24,216	78–69	L1
148	September 17	@ Tigers	4–5	Mlicki (6–11)	R. Martínez (10–7)	Jones (39)	Comerica Park	33,174	78–70	L2
149	September 19	Indians	7–4	Beck (2–0)	Nagy (2–6)	Lowe (37)	Fenway Park	32,512	79–70	W1
150	September 20 (1)	Indians	1–2	Woodard (3–10)	P. Martínez (17–6)	Wickman (27)	Fenway Park	33,002	79–71	L1
151	September 20 (2)	Indians	4–5	Karsay (5–8)	Cormier (2–3)	Wickman (28)	Fenway Park	32,751	79–72	L2
152	September 21 (1)	Indians	9–8	Ontiveros (1–1)	Speier (4–2)	Lowe (38)	Fenway Park	31,404	80–72	W1
153	September 21 (2)	Indians	5–8	Finley (14–11)	Wakefield (6–10)	—	Fenway Park	32,743	80–73	L1
154	September 22	Orioles	1–3	Ponson (9–12)	R. Martínez (10–8)	—	Fenway Park	32,708	80–74	L2
155	September 23	Orioles	8–7 (10)	Carrasco (5–3)	Kohlmeier (0–1)	—	Fenway Park	32,273	81–74	W1
156	September 24	Orioles	0–1	Mussina (10–15)	Ohka (3–6)	Kohlmeier (12)	Fenway Park	32,183	81–75	L1
157	September 26	@ White Sox	4–3	P. Martínez (18–6)	Beirne (1–3)	Lowe (39)	Comiskey Park	23,139	82–75	W1
158	September 27	@ White Sox	2–1	Crawford (2–1)	Baldwin (14–6)	Lowe (40)	Comiskey Park	16,368	83–75	W2
159	September 28	@ White Sox	7–6	Beck (3–0)	Simas (2–3)	Lowe (41)	Comiskey Park	18,326	84–75	W3
160	September 29	@ Devil Rays	6–8	Yan (7–8)	Carrasco (5–4)	Hernández (32)	Tropicana Field	18,290	84–76	L1
161	September 30	@ Devil Rays	4–2	Cormier (3–3)	Hernández (4–7)	Lowe (42)	Tropicana Field	23,447	85–76	W1
162	October 1	@ Devil Rays	2–3 (10)	Wheeler (1–1)	Croushore (2–1)	—	Tropicana Field	28,043	85–77	L1

== Awards and honors ==
Awards

- Pedro Martínez – AL Pitcher of the Month (April)

Accomplishments

- Pedro Martínez – Lowest WHIP, (0.74)

All-Star Game

- Carl Everett, reserve OF
- Nomar Garciaparra, reserve SS
- Derek Lowe, reserve P
- Pedro Martínez, reserve P (did not attend)

== Farm system ==
Level	Team	League	Manager
AAA	Pawtucket Red Sox	International League	Gary Jones
AA	Trenton Thunder	Eastern League	Billy Gardner Jr.
A-Advanced	Sarasota Red Sox	Florida State League	Ron Johnson
A	Augusta GreenJackets	South Atlantic League	Mike Boulanger
A-Short Season	Lowell Spinners	New York–Penn League	Arnie Beyeler
Rookie	GCL Red Sox	Gulf Coast League	John Sanders
Rookie	DSL Red Sox	Dominican Summer League	Nelson Norman
Rookie	DSL cooperative	Dominican Summer League	
Rookie	VSL Red Sox (cooperative)	Venezuelan Summer League	Rudy Hernandez

In addition to the DSL Red Sox, the team shared a DSL team with the Arizona Diamondbacks.
VSL cooperative was with the Milwaukee Brewers and Minnesota Twins.
