= 2000 New York Yankees season =

Season for the Major League Baseball team the New York Yankees

2000 New York Yankees
- World Series champions American League champions American League East champions
- League: American League
- Division: East
- Ballpark: Yankee Stadium
- City: New York City
- Record: 87–74 (.540)
- Divisional place: 1st
- Owners: George Steinbrenner
- General managers: Brian Cashman
- Managers: Joe Torre
- Television: WNYW (Bobby Murcer, Tim McCarver); MSG (Ken Singleton, Jim Kaat, Al Trautwig, Suzyn Waldman)
- Radio: WABC (AM) (John Sterling, Michael Kay)

The 2000 New York Yankees season was the 98th season for the Yankees. New York was managed by Joe Torre. The team finished first in the American League East with a record of 87–74, 2.5 games ahead of the Boston Red Sox, after losing 15 of their final 18 games, including their last 7. Despite having the lowest winning percentage of any postseason qualifier in 2000, the Yankees won the World Series over the New York Mets in 5 games to win their 26th World Series title. As of the 2026 MLB season, the 2000 Yankees remain the last team to three-peat in the World Series.

== Offseason ==
- November 29, 1999: Mike Stanton was signed as a free agent with the New York Yankees.
- December 1, 1999: Chili Davis was released by the New York Yankees.
- December 13, 1999: Chad Curtis was traded by the New York Yankees to the Texas Rangers for Brandon Knight and Sam Marsonek.
- December 15, 1999: Ryan Thompson signed as a free agent with the New York Yankees.
- January 26, 2000: Roberto Kelly signed as a free agent with the New York Yankees.
- February 1, 2000: Tim Raines signed as a free agent with the New York Yankees.
- March 17, 2000: Ted Lilly was Sent by the Montreal Expos to the New York Yankees to complete an earlier deal made on December 22, 1999. The Montreal Expos sent players to be named later and Jake Westbrook to the New York Yankees for Hideki Irabu. The Montreal Expos sent Ted Lilly (March 17, 2000) and Christian Parker (March 22, 2000) to the New York Yankees to complete the trade.
- March 23, 2000: Tim Raines was released by the New York Yankees.

=== Notable transactions ===
- April 2, 2000: Lance Johnson signed as a free agent with the New York Yankees.
- April 2, 2000: Félix José was signed as a free agent with the New York Yankees.
- April 2, 2000: Ryan Thompson was released by the New York Yankees.
- May 1, 2000: Ryan Thompson signed as a free agent with the New York Yankees.
- May 14, 2000: Randall Simon was signed as a free agent with the New York Yankees.
- June 11, 2000: Dwight Gooden signed as a free agent with the New York Yankees.
- June 20, 2000: Jim Leyritz was traded by the New York Yankees to the Los Angeles Dodgers for José Vizcaíno and cash.
- June 29, 2000: David Justice was traded by the Cleveland Indians to the New York Yankees for Ricky Ledée, Jake Westbrook, and Zach Day.
- July 12, 2000: Denny Neagle was traded by the Cincinnati Reds with Mike Frank to the New York Yankees for Ed Yarnall, Drew Henson, Brian Reith, and Jackson Melián.
- July 21, 2000: Glenallen Hill was traded by the Chicago Cubs to the New York Yankees for Ben Ford and Oswaldo Mairena.
- August 3, 2000: Luis Polonia was signed as a free agent with the New York Yankees.
- August 7, 2000: José Canseco was selected off waivers by the New York Yankees from the Tampa Bay Devil Rays.
- August 7, 2000: Luis Sojo was traded by the Pittsburgh Pirates to the New York Yankees for Chris Spurling.

== Season standings ==
AL East
| Team | W | L | Pct. | GB | Home | Road |
|---|---|---|---|---|---|---|
| New York Yankees | 87 | 74 | .540 | — | 44‍–‍36 | 43‍–‍38 |
| Boston Red Sox | 85 | 77 | .525 | 2½ | 42‍–‍39 | 43‍–‍38 |
| Toronto Blue Jays | 83 | 79 | .512 | 4½ | 45‍–‍36 | 38‍–‍43 |
| Baltimore Orioles | 74 | 88 | .457 | 13½ | 44‍–‍37 | 30‍–‍51 |
| Tampa Bay Devil Rays | 69 | 92 | .429 | 18 | 36‍–‍44 | 33‍–‍48 |

== Season summary ==
On September 28, 2000, the Yankees played the Devil Rays at Tampa Bay. In the top of the 2nd inning, Jose Canseco was walked. Tino Martinez then hit a double to center field. The ball was fielded by Gerald Williams and relayed to Mike DiFelice. He tagged Jose Canseco at the plate and proceeded to tag out Tino Martinez who was running right behind Canseco. Mike DiFelice tagged both runners out at the plate.

The Yankees only played 161 games because they had a game rained out against the Florida Marlins that was not made up due to scheduling constraints and lack of playoff implications.

=== Record vs. opponents ===
2000 American League record Source: MLB Standings Grid – 2000
| Team | ANA | BAL | BOS | CWS | CLE | DET | KC | MIN | NYY | OAK | SEA | TB | TEX | TOR | NL |
|---|---|---|---|---|---|---|---|---|---|---|---|---|---|---|---|
| Anaheim | — | 7–5 | 5–4 | 4–6 | 3–6 | 5–5 | 6–6 | 7–3 | 5–5 | 5–8 | 5–8 | 6–6 | 7–5 | 5–7 | 12–6 |
| Baltimore | 5–7 | — | 5–7 | 4–6 | 5–4 | 6–4 | 3–7 | 6–3 | 5–7 | 4–8 | 3–7 | 8–5 | 6–6 | 7–6 | 7–11 |
| Boston | 4–5 | 7–5 | — | 7–5 | 6–6 | 7–5 | 4–6 | 8–2 | 6–7 | 5–5 | 5–5 | 6–6 | 7–3 | 4–8 | 9–9 |
| Chicago | 6–4 | 6–4 | 5–7 | — | 8–5 | 9–3 | 5–7 | 7–5 | 8–4 | 6–3 | 7–5 | 6–4 | 5–5 | 5–5 | 12–6 |
| Cleveland | 6–3 | 4–5 | 6–6 | 5–8 | — | 6–7 | 5–7 | 5–8 | 5–5 | 6–6 | 7–2 | 8–2 | 6–4 | 8–4 | 13–5 |
| Detroit | 5–5 | 4–6 | 5–7 | 3–9 | 7–6 | — | 5–7 | 7–6 | 8–4 | 6–4 | 7–2 | 4–5 | 5–5 | 3–9 | 10–8 |
| Kansas City | 6–6 | 7–3 | 6–4 | 7–5 | 7–5 | 7–5 | — | 7–5 | 2–8 | 4–8 | 4–8 | 5–5 | 3–7 | 4–6 | 8–10 |
| Minnesota | 3–7 | 3–6 | 2–8 | 5–7 | 8–5 | 6–7 | 5–7 | — | 5–5 | 5–7 | 3–9 | 4–6 | 8–4 | 5–4 | 7–11 |
| New York | 5–5 | 7–5 | 7–6 | 4–8 | 5–5 | 4–8 | 8–2 | 5–5 | — | 6–3 | 4–6 | 6–6 | 10–2 | 5–7 | 11–6 |
| Oakland | 8–5 | 8–4 | 5–5 | 3–6 | 6–6 | 4–6 | 8–4 | 7–5 | 3–6 | — | 9–4 | 7–2 | 5–7 | 7–3 | 11–7 |
| Seattle | 8–5 | 7–3 | 5–5 | 5–7 | 2–7 | 2–7 | 8–4 | 9–3 | 6–4 | 4–9 | — | 9–3 | 7–5 | 8–2 | 11–7 |
| Tampa Bay | 6–6 | 5–8 | 6–6 | 4–6 | 2–8 | 5–4 | 5–5 | 6–4 | 6–6 | 2–7 | 3–9 | — | 5–7 | 5–7 | 9–9 |
| Texas | 5–7 | 6–6 | 3–7 | 5–5 | 4–6 | 5–5 | 7–3 | 4–8 | 2–10 | 7–5 | 5–7 | 7–5 | — | 4–6 | 7–11 |
| Toronto | 7–5 | 6–7 | 8–4 | 5–5 | 4–8 | 9–3 | 6–4 | 4–5 | 7–5 | 3–7 | 2–8 | 7–5 | 6–4 | — | 9–9 |

=== Detailed records ===
American League
| Opponent | W | L | WP | RS | RA |
AL East
| Baltimore Orioles | 7 | 5 | 0.583 | 85 | 74 |
| Boston Red Sox | 7 | 6 | 0.538 | 63 | 38 |
| New York Yankees | | | | | |
| Tampa Bay Devil Rays | 6 | 6 | 0.500 | 50 | 54 |
| Toronto Blue Jays | 5 | 7 | 0.417 | 51 | 63 |
| Total | 25 | 24 | 0.510 | 249 | 229 |
AL West
| Anaheim Angels | 5 | 5 | 0.500 | 54 | 51 |
| Oakland Athletics | 6 | 3 | 0.667 | 61 | 45 |
| Seattle Mariners | 4 | 6 | 0.400 | 52 | 59 |
| Texas Rangers | 10 | 2 | 0.833 | 80 | 52 |
| Total | 25 | 16 | 0.610 | 247 | 207 |
AL Central
| Chicago White Sox | 4 | 8 | 0.333 | 69 | 82 |
| Cleveland Indians | 5 | 5 | 0.500 | 37 | 55 |
| Detroit Tigers | 4 | 8 | 0.333 | 72 | 78 |
| Kansas City Royals | 8 | 2 | 0.800 | 54 | 34 |
| Minnesota Twins | 5 | 5 | 0.500 | 45 | 45 |
| Total | 26 | 28 | 0.481 | 277 | 294 |
National League
| Atlanta Braves | 2 | 1 | 0.667 | 19 | 19 |
| Florida Marlins | 1 | 1 | 0.500 | 15 | 13 |
| Montreal Expos | 2 | 1 | 0.667 | 19 | 9 |
| New York Mets | 4 | 2 | 0.667 | 25 | 24 |
| Philadelphia Phillies | 2 | 1 | 0.667 | 20 | 19 |
| Total | 11 | 6 | 0.647 | 98 | 84 |
| Season Total | 87 | 74 | 0.540 | 871 | 814 |

| Month | Games | Won | Lost | Win % | RS | RA |
|---|---|---|---|---|---|---|
| April | 23 | 15 | 8 | 0.652 | 112 | 106 |
| May | 26 | 13 | 13 | 0.500 | 122 | 111 |
| June | 25 | 10 | 15 | 0.400 | 155 | 153 |
| July | 26 | 18 | 8 | 0.692 | 167 | 113 |
| August | 30 | 18 | 12 | 0.600 | 187 | 148 |
| September | 30 | 13 | 17 | 0.433 | 125 | 176 |
| October | 1 | 0 | 1 | 0.000 | 3 | 7 |
| Total | 161 | 87 | 74 | 0.540 | 871 | 814 |

| | Games | Won | Lost | Win % | RS | RA |
| Home | 80 | 44 | 36 | 0.550 | 454 | 412 |
| Away | 81 | 43 | 38 | 0.531 | 417 | 402 |
| Total | 161 | 87 | 74 | 0.540 | 871 | 814 |

=== Opening Day starters ===
- 2B Chuck Knoblauch
- SS Derek Jeter
- CF Bernie Williams
- LF Ricky Ledée
- 1B Tino Martinez
- RF Paul O'Neill
- C Jorge Posada
- 3B Scott Brosius
- DH David Justice

=== Roster ===
2000 New York Yankees
Roster
| Pitchers: 58 Randy Choate; 22 Roger Clemens; 36 David Cone; 76 Craig Dingman; 67 Darrell Einertson; 50 Todd Erdos; 75 Ben Ford; 17 Dwight Gooden; 38 Jason Grimsley; 26 Orlando Hernández; 63 Randy Keisler; 56 Ted Lilly; 55 Ramiro Mendoza; 12 Denny Neagle; 43 Jeff Nelson; 46 Andy Pettitte; 42 Mariano Rivera; 29 Mike Stanton; 57 Jay Tessmer; 27 Allen Watson; 38 Jake Westbrook; 52 Ed Yarnall | Catchers: 13 Jim Leyritz; 20 Jorge Posada; 25 Chris Turner; Infielders: 18 Scott Brosius; 14 Wilson Delgado; 2 Derek Jeter; 11 Chuck Knoblauch; 24 Tino Martinez; 14 Luis Sojo; 53,33 Alfonso Soriano; 13 José Vizcaíno | Outfielders: 35 Clay Bellinger; 33 Jose Canseco; 31 Glenallen Hill; 31 Lance Johnson; 45 Félix José; 28 David Justice; 39 Roberto Kelly; 17 Ricky Ledée; 21 Paul O'Neill; 19 Luis Polonia; 47 Shane Spencer; 33,45 Ryan Thompson; 51 Bernie Williams | Manager: 6 Joe Torre; Coaches: 48 Chris Chambliss (Hitting); 40 Tony Cloninger (Bullpen); 54 Lee Mazzilli (First Base); 30 Willie Randolph (Third Base); 34 Mel Stottlemyre (Pitching); 52 Don Zimmer (Bench) |

== Game log ==
=== Regular season ===
Legend
| Yankees Win | Yankees Loss | Game postponed |

2000 Game Log (87–74) Home: 44–35 Away: 43–39
April (15–8) Home: 8–3 Away: 7–5

| # | Date | Opponent | Score | Win | Loss | Save | Location | Attendance | Record |
|---|---|---|---|---|---|---|---|---|---|
| 1 | April 3 | @ Angels | 3–2 | Hernandez (1–0) | Hill (0–1) | Rivera (1) | Edison International Field of Anaheim | 42,704 | 1–0 |
| 2 | April 4 | @ Angels | 5–3 | Mendoza (1–0) | Percival (0–1) | Rivera (2) | Edison International Field of Anaheim | 25,818 | 2–0 |
| 3 | April 5 | @ Angels | 6–12 | Schoeneweis (1–0) | Cone (0–1) | — | Edison International Field of Anaheim | 24,560 | 2–1 |
| 4 | April 7 | @ Mariners | 5–7 | Halama (1–0) | Pettitte (0–1) | Sasaki (2) | Safeco Field | 40,827 | 2–2 |
| 5 | April 8 | @ Mariners | 3–2 | Nelson (1–0) | Mesa (1–1) | Rivera (3) | Safeco Field | 45,261 | 3–2 |
| 6 | April 9 | @ Mariners | 3–9 | Moyer (1–1) | Clemens (0–1) | — | Safeco Field | 45,488 | 3–3 |
| – | April 11 | Rangers | Postponed (rain) Rescheduled for August 21 | | | | | | |
| 7 | April 12 | Rangers | 8–6 | Nelson (2–0) | Munoz (0–1) | Rivera (4) | Yankee Stadium | 48,487 | 4–3 |
| 8 | April 13 | Rangers | 5–1 | Hernandez (2–0) | Rogers (1–2) | — | Yankee Stadium | 23,805 | 5–3 |
| 9 | April 14 | Royals | 7–5 | Clemens (1–1) | Witasick (0–3) | Rivera (5) | Yankee Stadium | 33,094 | 6–3 |
| 10 | April 15 | Royals | 7–1 | Mendoza (2–0) | Rosado (1–1) | — | Yankee Stadium | 34,056 | 7–3 |
| 11 | April 16 | Royals | 8–4 | Nelson (3–0) | Fussell (1–1) | — | Yankee Stadium | 36,724 | 8–3 |
| 12 | April 17 | @ Rangers | 5–4 (11) | Rivera (1–0) | Crabtree (0–1) | Erdos (1) | The Ballpark in Arlington | 38,166 | 9–3 |
| 13 | April 18 | @ Rangers | 6–3 | Hernandez (3–0) | Rogers (1–3) | — | The Ballpark in Arlington | 43,644 | 10–3 |
| 14 | April 19 | @ Rangers | 5–4 (10) | Rivera (2–0) | Zimmerman (0–2) | — | The Ballpark in Arlington | 39,294 | 11–3 |
| 15 | April 21 | @ Blue Jays | 3–8 | Carpenter (1–3) | Mendoza (2–1) | — | SkyDome | 25,921 | 11–4 |
| 16 | April 22 | @ Blue Jays | 2–8 | Escobar (2–2) | Cone (0–2) | — | SkyDome | 30,167 | 11–5 |
| 17 | April 23 | @ Blue Jays | 10–7 | Hernandez (4–0) | Andrews (0–1) | Rivera (6) | SkyDome | 20,485 | 12–5 |
| 18 | April 24 | Twins | 3–7 | Milton (2–0) | Clemens (1–2) | — | Yankee Stadium | 35,693 | 12–6 |
| 19 | April 25 | Twins | 1–6 | Bergman (2–0) | Mendoza (2–2) | — | Yankee Stadium | 27,372 | 12–7 |
| 20 | April 26 | Twins | 2–0 | Nelson (4–0) | Mays (0–3) | Rivera (7) | Yankee Stadium | 27,719 | 13–7 |
| 21 | April 28 | Blue Jays | 6–0 | Cone (1–2) | Escobar (2–3) | — | Yankee Stadium | 35,987 | 14–7 |
| 22 | April 29 | Blue Jays | 2–6 | Wells (4–1) | Hernandez (4–1) | Koch (5) | Yankee Stadium | 38,783 | 14–8 |
| 23 | April 30 | Blue Jays | 7–1 | Clemens (2–2) | Halladay (2–4) | — | Yankee Stadium | 43,721 | 15–8 |

May (13–13) Home: 7–7 Away: 6–6

| # | Date | Opponent | Score | Win | Loss | Save | Location | Attendance | Record |
|---|---|---|---|---|---|---|---|---|---|
| 24 | May 1 | @ Indians | 2–1 | Mendoza (3–2) | Wright (2–2) | Rivera (8) | Jacobs Field | 42,711 | 16–8 |
| 25 | May 2 | @ Indians | 4–2 | Pettitte (1–1) | Witt (0–1) | Rivera (9) | Jacobs Field | 42,801 | 17–8 |
| 26 | May 3 | @ Indians | 6–5 | Grimsley (1–0) | Karsay (0–1) | Rivera (10) | Jacobs Field | 42,837 | 18–8 |
| 27 | May 5 | Orioles | 12–10 | Nelson (5–0) | Ryan (1–2) | — | Yankee Stadium | 42,224 | 19–8 |
| 28 | May 6 | Orioles | 3–1 | Clemens (3–2) | Rapp (3–2) | Rivera (11) | Yankee Stadium | 54,350 | 20–8 |
| 29 | May 7 | Orioles | 6–7 | Groom (2–1) | Rivera (2–1) | Timlin (2) | Yankee Stadium | 52,559 | 20–9 |
| 30 | May 8 | Devil Rays | 6–3 | Pettitte (2–1) | Gooden (2–2) | Rivera (12) | Yankee Stadium | 25,361 | 21–9 |
| 31 | May 9 | Devil Rays | 4–3 (10) | Nelson (6–0) | White (0–2) | — | Yankee Stadium | 23,097 | 22–9 |
| – | May 10 | Devil Rays | Postponed (rain) Rescheduled for May 11 | | | | | | |
| 32 | May 11 | Devil Rays | 0–1 | Trachsel (3–2) | Hernandez (4–2) | Lopez (1) | Yankee Stadium | 14,292 | 22–10 |
| 33 | May 12 | @ Tigers | 7–9 | Nitkowski (2–6) | Clemens (3–3) | Jones (8) | Comerica Park | 33,326 | 22–11 |
| 34 | May 13 | @ Tigers | 3–6 | Weaver (1–4) | Pettitte (2–2) | Jones (9) | Comerica Park | 36,520 | 22–12 |
| 35 | May 14 | @ Tigers | 1–2 | Mlicki (1–5) | Cone (1–3) | Jones (10) | Comerica Park | 31,313 | 22–13 |
| 36 | May 16 | White Sox | 0–4 | Eldred (3–2) | Hernandez (4–3) | — | Yankee Stadium | 31,143 | 22–14 |
| 37 | May 17 | White Sox | 9–4 | Clemens (4–3) | Parque (3–2) | — | Yankee Stadium | 26,887 | 23–14 |
| 38 | May 19 | @ Indians | 11–7 | Mendoza (4–2) | Kamieniecki (1–2) | — | Jacobs Field | 42,642 | 24–14 |
| 39 | May 20 | @ Indians | 2–3 | Shuey (3–1) | Nelson (6–1) | — | Jacobs Field | 42,583 | 24–15 |
| 40 | May 21 | @ Indians | 1–6 | Rigdon (1–0) | Hernandez (4–4) | — | Jacobs Field | 42,587 | 24–16 |
| 41 | May 23 | @ White Sox | 2–8 | Wells (3–3) | Clemens (4–4) | — | Comiskey Park | 21,863 | 24–17 |
| 42 | May 24 | @ White Sox | 12–4 | Pettitte (3–2) | Sirotka (3–4) | — | Comiskey Park | 23,144 | 25–17 |
| 43 | May 25 | @ White Sox | 7–0 | Mendoza (5–2) | Baldwin (7–1) | — | Comiskey Park | 23,636 | 26–17 |
| 44 | May 26 | Red Sox | 1–4 | R. Martinez (4–3) | Cone (1–4) | Lowe (10) | Yankee Stadium | 54,470 | 26–18 |
| 45 | May 27 | Red Sox | 8–3 | Stanton (1–0) | Wasdin (0–1) | — | Yankee Stadium | 55,671 | 27–18 |
| 46 | May 28 | Red Sox | 0–2 | P. Martinez (8–2) | Clemens (4–5) | — | Yankee Stadium | 55,339 | 27–19 |
| 47 | May 29 | Athletics | 4–1 | Pettitte (4–2) | Olivares (3–6) | — | Yankee Stadium | 41,284 | 28–19 |
| 48 | May 30 | Athletics | 4–7 | Appier (5–3) | Mendoza (5–3) | Isringhausen (10) | Yankee Stadium | 26,360 | 28–20 |
| 49 | May 31 | Athletics | 7–8 | Heredia (7–3) | Cone (1–5) | Isringhausen (11) | Yankee Stadium | 30,178 | 28–21 |

June (10–15) Home: 2–6 Away: 8–9

| # | Date | Opponent | Score | Win | Loss | Save | Location | Attendance | Record |
|---|---|---|---|---|---|---|---|---|---|
| 50 | June 2 | @ Braves | 5–2 | O. Hernandez (5–4) | Millwood (4–4) | Rivera (13) | Turner Field | 48,524 | 29–21 |
| 51 | June 3 | @ Braves | 7–11 | Remlinger (1–1) | Grimsley (1–1) | — | Turner Field | 48,423 | 29–22 |
| 52 | June 4 | @ Braves | 7–6 | Pettitte (5–2) | Mulholland (5–5) | Rivera (14) | Turner Field | 47,756 | 30–22 |
| 53 | June 5 | @ Expos | 4–6 | Johnson (2–0) | Cone (1–6) | Kline (6) | Olympic Stadium | 18,095 | 30–23 |
| 54 | June 6 | @ Expos | 8–1 | Grimsley (2–1) | Vazquez (6–2) | — | Olympic Stadium | 24,453 | 31–23 |
| 55 | June 7 | @ Expos | 7–2 | O. Hernandez (6–4) | Pavano (6–3) | — | Olympic Stadium | 25,381 | 32–23 |
| 56 | June 9 | Mets | 2–12 | Leiter (7–1) | Clemens (4–6) | — | Yankee Stadium | 55,822 | 32–24 |
| 57 | June 10 | Mets | 13–5 | Pettitte (6–2) | Jones (1–3) | — | Yankee Stadium | 55,839 | 33–24 |
| – | June 11 | Mets | Postponed (rain) Rescheduled for July 8 | | | | | | |
| – | June 12 | Red Sox | Postponed (rain) Rescheduled for September 11 | | | | | | |
| 58 | June 13 | Red Sox | 3–5 | Pichardo (1–0) | O. Hernandez (6–5) | D. Lowe (15) | Yankee Stadium | 52,142 | 33–25 |
| 59 | June 14 | Red Sox | 2–1 | Grimsley (3–1) | Wakefield (2–5) | Rivera (15) | Yankee Stadium | 54,834 | 34–25 |
| 60 | June 15 | White Sox | 3–12 | Sirotka (6–5) | Pettitte (6–3) | — | Yankee Stadium | 30,803 | 34–26 |
| 61 | June 16 | White Sox | 1–3 | Baldwin (10–1) | Stanton (1–1) | Howry (3) | Yankee Stadium | 41,910 | 34–27 |
| 62 | June 17 | White Sox | 9–10 | Eldred (8–2) | Westbrook (0–1) | Foulke (16) | Yankee Stadium | 54,053 | 34–28 |
| 63 | June 18 | White Sox | 4–17 | Parque (7–2) | O. Hernandez (6–6) | — | Yankee Stadium | 52,856 | 34–29 |
| 64 | June 19 | @ Red Sox | 22–1 | Mendoza (6–3) | Rose (3–4) | — | Fenway Park | 33,370 | 35–29 |
| 65 | June 20 | @ Red Sox | 3–0 | Pettitte (7–3) | P. Martinez (9–3) | Rivera (16) | Fenway Park | 33,909 | 36–29 |
| 66 | June 21 | @ Red Sox | 7–9 | Garces (3–0) | Grimsley (3–2) | — | Fenway Park | 32,958 | 36–30 |
| 67 | June 22 | @ Red Sox | 2–4 | R. Martinez (6–4) | Westbrook (0–2) | D. Lowe (17) | Fenway Park | 33,744 | 36–31 |
| 68 | June 23 | @ White Sox | 3–4 | S. Lowe (2–1) | Rivera (2–2) | — | Comiskey Park | 38,773 | 36–32 |
| 69 | June 24 | @ White Sox | 12–8 | Mendoza (7–3) | Wells (4–6) | Rivera (17) | Comiskey Park | 32,623 | 37–32 |
| 70 | June 25 | @ White Sox | 7–8 | Sirotka (7–6) | Pettitte (7–4) | Howry (4) | Comiskey Park | 40,817 | 37–33 |
| 71 | June 27 | @ Tigers | 6–7 (11) | Cruz (1–0) | Rivera (2–3) | — | Comerica Park | 37,512 | 37–34 |
| 72 | June 28 | @ Tigers | 6–13 | Blair (5–1) | Ford (0–1) | Sparks (1) | Comerica Park | 39,212 | 37–35 |
| 73 | June 29 | @ Tigers | 8–0 | Pettitte (8–4) | Mlicki (2–9) | — | Comerica Park | 39,586 | 38–35 |
| 74 | June 30 | @ Devil Rays | 4–6 | Mecir (6–1) | Nelson (6–2) | R. Hernandez (11) | Tropicana Field | 30,323 | 38–36 |

July (18–8) Home: 9–4 Away: 9–4

| # | Date | Opponent | Score | Win | Loss | Save | Location | Attendance | Record |
|---|---|---|---|---|---|---|---|---|---|
| 75 | July 1 | @ Devil Rays | 6–1 | Hernandez (7–6) | Lopez (4–6) | — | Tropicana Field | 37,990 | 39–36 |
| 76 | July 2 | @ Devil Rays | 5–2 | Clemens (5–6) | Trachsel (6–8) | Rivera (18) | Tropicana Field | 31,118 | 40–36 |
| 77 | July 4 | Orioles | 6–7 | Erickson (4–6) | Cone (1–7) | Trombley (2) | Yankee Stadium | 44,447 | 40–37 |
| 78 | July 5 | Orioles | 12–6 | Pettitte (9–4) | Rapp (5–6) | — | Yankee Stadium | 40,031 | 41–37 |
| 79 | July 6 | Orioles | 13–9 | Stanton (2–1) | Johnson (0–8) | — | Yankee Stadium | 44,104 | 42–37 |
| 80 | July 7 | @ Mets | 2–1 | Hernandez (8–6) | Leiter (10–2) | Rivera (19) | Shea Stadium | 54,132 | 43–37 |
| 81 | July 8 (1) | @ Mets | 4–2 | Gooden (3–3) | B. Jones (3–4) | Rivera (20) | Shea Stadium | 54,165 | 44–37 |
| 82 | July 8 (2) | Mets | 4–2 | Clemens (6–6) | Rusch (6–7) | Rivera (21) | Yankee Stadium | 55,821 | 45–37 |
| 83 | July 9 | @ Mets | 0–2 | Hampton (9–5) | Pettitte (9–5) | Benitez (19) | Shea Stadium | 54,286 | 45–38 |
All-Star Break: AL defeats NL 6–3 at Turner Field
| 84 | July 13 | Marlins | 9–11 | Penny (5–7) | Hernandez (8–7) | Alfonseca (29) | Yankee Stadium | 33,323 | 45–39 |
| 85 | July 14 | Marlins | 6–2 | Clemens (7–6) | Dempster (9–6) | — | Yankee Stadium | 35,332 | 46–39 |
| – | July 15 | Marlins | Cancelled (rain) | | | | | | |
| 86 | July 16 | Phillies | 9–8 (10) | Rivera (3–3) | Brantley (1–4) | — | Yankee Stadium | 53,131 | 47–39 |
| 87 | July 17 | Phillies | 8–10 | Coggin (2–0) | Cone (1–8) | Brock (1) | Yankee Stadium | 38,987 | 47–40 |
| 88 | July 18 | Phillies | 3–1 | Neagle (9–2) | Schilling (5–6) | Rivera (22) | Yankee Stadium | 40,013 | 48–40 |
| 89 | July 19 | Tigers | 9–1 | Clemens (8–6) | Nomo (3–9) | — | Yankee Stadium | 32,420 | 49–40 |
| 90 | July 20 | Tigers | 3–5 | Blair (6–2) | Pettitte (9–6) | T. Jones (26) | Yankee Stadium | 45,535 | 49–41 |
| 91 | July 21 | Devil Rays | 11–1 | Gooden (4–3) | Yan (4–7) | — | Yankee Stadium | 39,518 | 50–41 |
| 92 | July 22 | Devil Rays | 4–12 | Rupe (2–4) | Cone (1–9) | — | Yankee Stadium | 47,375 | 50–42 |
| 93 | July 23 | Devil Rays | 5–1 | Neagle (10–2) | Rekar (3–6) | — | Yankee Stadium | 45,528 | 51–42 |
| 94 | July 24 | @ Orioles | 4–3 | Clemens (9–6) | Parrish (0–1) | Rivera (23) | Oriole Park at Camden Yards | 47,450 | 52–42 |
| 95 | July 25 | @ Orioles | 19–1 | Pettitte (10–6) | Erickson (5–8) | — | Oriole Park at Camden Yards | 47,874 | 53–42 |
| 96 | July 26 | @ Orioles | 4–1 | Gooden (5–3) | Ponson (5–7) | Rivera (24) | Oriole Park at Camden Yards | 47,691 | 54–42 |
| 97 | July 27 | @ Twins | 3–9 | Redman (9–4) | Cone (1–10) | — | Hubert H. Humphrey Metrodome | 16,325 | 54–43 |
| 98 | July 28 | @ Twins | 9–5 | Rivera (4–3) | Guardado (4–3) | — | Hubert H. Humphrey Metrodome | 16,823 | 55–43 |
| 99 | July 29 | @ Twins | 2–6 | Milton (10–6) | Mendoza (7–4) | — | Hubert H. Humphrey Metrodome | 31,426 | 55–44 |
| 100 | July 30 | @ Twins | 7–4 | Pettitte (11–6) | Mays (6–12) | — | Hubert H. Humphrey Metrodome | 19,041 | 56–44 |

August (18–12) Home: 11–7 Away: 7–5

| # | Date | Opponent | Score | Win | Loss | Save | Location | Attendance | Record |
|---|---|---|---|---|---|---|---|---|---|
| 101 | August 1 | Royals | 5–4 | Nelson (7–2) | Bottalico (7–3) | Rivera (25) | Yankee Stadium | 32,649 | 57–44 |
| 102 | August 2 | Royals | 1–4 | Stein (2–3) | Neagle (10–3) | Bottalico (9) | Yankee Stadium | 38,993 | 57–45 |
| 103 | August 3 | Royals | 3–2 | Rivera (5–3) | Spradlin (4–4) | — | Yankee Stadium | 33,829 | 58–45 |
| 104 | August 4 | Mariners | 13–6 | Pettitte (12–6) | Moyer (11–4) | — | Yankee Stadium | 46,592 | 59–45 |
| 105 | August 5 | Mariners | 5–6 | Tomko (6–3) | Gooden (5–4) | Sasaki (26) | Yankee Stadium | 55,629 | 59–46 |
| 106 | August 6 | Mariners | 1–11 | Abbott (7–4) | Hernandez (8–8) | — | Yankee Stadium | 52,720 | 59–47 |
| 107 | August 7 | Mariners | 5–8 | Halama (10–5) | Neagle (10–4) | — | Yankee Stadium | 38,421 | 59–48 |
| 108 | August 8 | Athletics | 4–3 | Rivera (6–3) | Isringhausen (5–4) | — | Yankee Stadium | 36,357 | 60–48 |
| 109 | August 9 | Athletics | 12–1 | Pettitte (13–6) | Appier (10–9) | — | Yankee Stadium | 33,466 | 61–48 |
| 110 | August 10 | Athletics | 12–6 | Cone (2–10) | Mulder (6–8) | — | Yankee Stadium | 41,011 | 62–48 |
| 111 | August 11 | @ Angels | 3–8 | Schoeneweis (6–6) | Hernandez (8–9) | — | Edison International Field of Anaheim | 43,169 | 62–49 |
| 112 | August 12 | @ Angels | 6–9 | Pote (1–0) | Neagle (10–5) | Hasegawa (5) | Edison International Field of Anaheim | 43,394 | 62–50 |
| 113 | August 13 | @ Angels | 4–1 | Clemens (10–6) | Ortiz (4–3) | Rivera (26) | Edison International Field of Anaheim | 43,411 | 63–50 |
| 114 | August 14 | @ Rangers | 7–3 | Pettitte (14–6) | Perisho (2–5) | — | The Ballpark in Arlington | 36,260 | 64–50 |
| 115 | August 15 | @ Rangers | 10–2 | Cone (3–10) | Davis (4–4) | Gooden (1) | The Ballpark in Arlington | 35,365 | 65–50 |
| 116 | August 16 | @ Rangers | 0–5 | Sikorski (1–0) | Hernandez (8–10) | — | The Ballpark in Arlington | 34,446 | 65–51 |
| 117 | August 17 | Angels | 6–1 | Neagle (11–5) | Mercker (0–2) | — | Yankee Stadium | 35,180 | 66–51 |
| 118 | August 18 | Angels | 8–9 (11) | Hasegawa (8–2) | Stanton (2–2) | — | Yankee Stadium | 37,503 | 66–52 |
| 119 | August 19 | Angels | 9–1 | Pettitte (15–6) | Cooper (4–8) | — | Yankee Stadium | 49,491 | 67–52 |
| 120 | August 20 | Angels | 4–5 | Wise (2–1) | Nelson (7–3) | Hasegawa (6) | Yankee Stadium | 50,048 | 67–53 |
| 121 | August 21 | Rangers | 12–3 | Hernandez (9–10) | Sikorski (1–1) | — | Yankee Stadium | 16,310 | 68–53 |
| 122 | August 22 | Rangers | 4–5 | Crabtree (2–6) | Neagle (11–6) | Wetteland (27) | Yankee Stadium | 39,915 | 68–54 |
| 123 | August 23 | Rangers | 10–9 | Rivera (7–3) | Crabtree (2–7) | — | Yankee Stadium | 33,081 | 69–54 |
| 124 | August 24 | Rangers | 8–7 | Pettitte (16–6) | Perisho (2–7) | Rivera (27) | Yankee Stadium | 44,578 | 70–54 |
| 125 | August 25 | @ Athletics | 1–8 | Appier (12–9) | Cone (3–11) | — | Network Associates Coliseum | 47,773 | 70–55 |
| 126 | August 26 | @ Athletics | 10–6 | Hernandez (10–10) | Mulder (7–10) | Rivera (28) | Network Associates Coliseum | 43,099 | 71–55 |
| 127 | August 27 | @ Athletics | 7–5 | Neagle (12–6) | Mecir (8–3) | Rivera (29) | Network Associates Coliseum | 39,348 | 72–55 |
| 128 | August 28 | @ Mariners | 9–1 | Clemens (11–6) | Abbott (8–5) | — | Safeco Field | 45,077 | 73–55 |
| 129 | August 29 | @ Mariners | 3–5 | Tomko (7–4) | Pettitte (16–7) | Sasaki (30) | Safeco Field | 44,105 | 73–56 |
| 130 | August 30 | @ Mariners | 5–4 | Cone (4–11) | Sele (13–10) | Rivera (30) | Safeco Field | 44,962 | 74–56 |

September (13–17) Home: 7–8 Away: 6–9

| # | Date | Opponent | Score | Win | Loss | Save | Location | Attendance | Record |
|---|---|---|---|---|---|---|---|---|---|
| 131 | September 1 | Twins | 4–2 | O. Hernandez (11–10) | Radke (10–14) | Rivera (31) | Yankee Stadium | 38,294 | 75–56 |
| 132 | September 2 | Twins | 13–4 (8) | Neagle (13–6) | Milton (12–8) | Grimsley (1) | Yankee Stadium | 47,438 | 76–56 |
| 133 | September 3 | Twins | 1–2 (10) | Guardado (5–3) | Rivera (7–4) | Hawkins (10) | Yankee Stadium | 42,365 | 76–57 |
| 134 | September 4 | @ Royals | 4–3 | Pettitte (17–7) | Suzuki (8–8) | Rivera (32) | Kauffman Stadium | 21,774 | 77–57 |
| 135 | September 5 | @ Royals | 10–5 | Gooden (6–4) | Suppan (7–9) | — | Kauffman Stadium | 15,025 | 78–57 |
| 136 | September 6 | @ Royals | 2–3 | Meadows (11–10) | Stanton (2–3) | — | Kauffman Stadium | 15,637 | 78–58 |
| 137 | September 7 | @ Royals | 7–3 | Neagle (14–6) | Bottalico (7–5) | Rivera (33) | Kauffman Stadium | 20,933 | 79–58 |
| 138 | September 8 | @ Red Sox | 4–0 | Clemens (12–6) | Ohka (3–4) | — | Fenway Park | 33,861 | 80–58 |
| 139 | September 9 | @ Red Sox | 5–3 | Pettitte (18–7) | Martinez (16–5) | — | Fenway Park | 33,355 | 81–58 |
| 140 | September 10 | @ Red Sox | 6–2 | Keisler (1–0) | Schourek (3–10) | Gooden (2) | Fenway Park | 33,062 | 82–58 |
| 141 | September 11 | Red Sox | 0–4 | Arrojo (10–11) | O. Hernandez (11–11) | D. Lowe (32) | Yankee Stadium | 40,326 | 82–59 |
| 142 | September 12 | Blue Jays | 10–2 | Neagle (15–6) | Hamilton (2–1) | — | Yankee Stadium | 30,370 | 83–59 |
| 143 | September 13 | Blue Jays | 3–2 | Clemens (13–6) | Loaiza (9–11) | Rivera (34) | Yankee Stadium | 29,083 | 84–59 |
| 144 | September 14 | Blue Jays | 2–3 (11) | Koch (8–3) | Choate (0–1) | Escobar (2) | Yankee Stadium | 35,040 | 84–60 |
| 145 | September 15 | Indians | 1–11 | Burba (15–6) | Cone (4–12) | — | Yankee Stadium | 48,443 | 84–61 |
| 146 | September 16 | Indians | 6–3 | O. Hernandez (12–11) | Bere (11–10) | — | Yankee Stadium | 55,097 | 85–61 |
| 147 | September 17 | Indians | 4–15 | Finley (13–11) | Neagle (15–7) | — | Yankee Stadium | 50,174 | 85–62 |
| 148 | September 18 | Indians | 0–2 | Colon (14–8) | Clemens (13–7) | — | Yankee Stadium | 31,317 | 85–63 |
| 149 | September 19 | @ Blue Jays | 3–16 | Trachsel (8–13) | Pettitte (18–8) | — | SkyDome | 28,908 | 85–64 |
| 150 | September 20 | @ Blue Jays | 2–7 | Loaiza (10–11) | Cone (4–13) | — | SkyDome | 28,463 | 85–65 |
| 151 | September 21 | @ Blue Jays | 1–3 | Wells (20–6) | O. Hernandez (12–12) | — | SkyDome | 30,074 | 85–66 |
| 152 | September 22 | Tigers | 6–9 | Nomo (8–11) | Neagle (15–8) | Jones (41) | Yankee Stadium | 37,092 | 85–67 |
| 153 | September 23 | Tigers | 13–8 | Nelson (8–3) | Blair (10–5) | Rivera (35) | Yankee Stadium | 40,029 | 86–67 |
| 154 | September 24 | Tigers | 6–3 | Pettitte (19–8) | Weaver (10–15) | Rivera (36) | Yankee Stadium | 41,415 | 87–67 |
| 155 | September 25 | Tigers | 4–15 | Sparks (7–5) | Gooden (6–5) | — | Yankee Stadium | 32,701 | 87–68 |
| 156 | September 26 | @ Devil Rays | 1–2 | R. Hernandez (4–6) | Nelson (8–4) | — | Tropicana Field | 19,469 | 87–69 |
| 157 | September 27 | @ Devil Rays | 1–11 | Lidle (4–6) | Neagle (15–9) | — | Tropicana Field | 18,863 | 87–70 |
| 158 | September 28 | @ Devil Rays | 3–11 | Rekar (7–10) | Clemens (13–8) | — | Tropicana Field | 20,961 | 87–71 |
| 159 | September 29 | @ Orioles | 2–13 | McElroy (3–0) | Pettitte (19–9) | — | Oriole Park at Camden Yards | 47,674 | 87–72 |
| 160 | September 30 | @ Orioles | 1–9 | Mussina (11–15) | Cone (4–14) | — | Oriole Park at Camden Yards | 48,129 | 87–73 |

October (0–1) Home: 0–0 Away: 0–1

| # | Date | Opponent | Score | Win | Loss | Save | Location | Attendance | Record |
|---|---|---|---|---|---|---|---|---|---|
| 161 | October 1 | @ Orioles | 3–7 | Mercedes (14–7) | Hernandez (12–13) | — | Oriole Park at Camden Yards | 47,831 | 87–74 |

=== Postseason ===
Legend
| Yankees Win | Yankees Loss | Game postponed |

2000 Postseason Game Log (11–5)
ALDS vs Athletics (3–2)

| # | Date | Opponent | Score | Win | Loss | Save | Location | Attendance | Record |
|---|---|---|---|---|---|---|---|---|---|
| 1 | October 3 | @ Athletics | 3-5 | Heredia (1–0) | Clemens (0–1) | Isringhausen (1) | Network Associates Coliseum | 47,360 | 0–1 |
| 2 | October 4 | @ Athletics | 4-0 | Pettitte (1–0) | Appier (0–1) | Rivera (1) | Network Associates Coliseum | 47,860 | 1-1 |
| 3 | October 6 | Athletics | 4-2 | Hernández (1–0) | Hudson (0–1) | Rivera (2) | Yankee Stadium | 56,606 | 2–1 |
| 4 | October 7 | Athletics | 1-11 | Zito (1–0) | Clemens (0–2) | | Yankee Stadium | 56,915 | 2-2 |
| 5 | October 8 | @ Athletics | 7-5 | Stanton (1–0) | Heredia (1-1) | Rivera (3) | Network Associates Coliseum | 41,170 | 3–2 |

ALCS vs Mariners (4–2)

| # | Date | Opponent | Score | Win | Loss | Save | Location | Attendance | Record |
|---|---|---|---|---|---|---|---|---|---|
| 1 | October 10 | Mariners | 0-2 | Garcia (1–0) | Neagle (0–1) | Sasaki (1) | Yankee Stadium | 54,481 | 0–1 |
| 2 | October 11 | Mariners | 7-1 | Hernández (2–0) | Rhodes (0–1) | | Yankee Stadium | 55,317 | 1-1 |
| 3 | October 13 | @ Mariners | 8-2 | Pettitte (2–0) | Sele (0–1) | Rivera (4) | Safeco Field | 47,827 | 2–1 |
| 4 | October 14 | @ Mariners | 5-0 | Clemens (1–2) | Abbott (1-1) | | Safeco Field | 47,803 | 3–1 |
| 5 | October 15 | @ Mariners | 2-6 | Garcia (2–0) | Neagle (0–2) | | Safeco Field | 47,802 | 3–2 |
| 6 | October 17 | Mariners | 9-7 | Hernández (3–0) | Paniagua (1-1) | | Yankee Stadium | 56,598 | 4–2 |

WS vs Mets (4–1)

| # | Date | Opponent | Score | Win | Loss | Save | Location | Attendance | Record |
|---|---|---|---|---|---|---|---|---|---|
| 1 | October 21 | Mets | 4-3 (12) | Stanton (2–0) | Wendell (1-1) | | Yankee Stadium | 55,913 | 1–0 |
| 2 | October 22 | Mets | 6-5 | Clemens (2-2) | Hampton (2-2) | | Yankee Stadium | 56,059 | 2–0 |
| 3 | October 24 | @ Mets | 2-4 | Franco (1–0) | Hernández (3–1) | Benítez (2) | Shea Stadium | 55,299 | 2–1 |
| 4 | October 25 | @ Mets | 3-2 | Nelson (1–0) | Jones (1-1) | Rivera (5) | Shea Stadium | 55,290 | 3–1 |
| 5 | October 26 | @ Mets | 4-2 | Stanton (3–0) | Leiter (0–1) | Rivera (6) | Shea Stadium | 55,292 | 4–1 |

== Player stats ==
| = Indicates team leader |

=== Batting ===
==== Starters by position ====
Note: Pos = Position; G = Games played; AB = At bats; R = Runs; H = Hits; HR = Home runs; RBI = Runs batted in; Avg. = Batting average; SB = Stolen bases

| Pos | Player | G | AB | R | H | HR | RBI | Avg. | SB |
|---|---|---|---|---|---|---|---|---|---|
| C | Jorge Posada | 151 | 505 | 92 | 145 | 28 | 86 | .287 | 2 |
| 1B | Tino Martinez | 155 | 569 | 69 | 147 | 16 | 91 | .258 | 4 |
| 2B | Chuck Knoblauch | 102 | 400 | 75 | 113 | 5 | 26 | .283 | 15 |
| 3B | Scott Brosius | 135 | 470 | 57 | 108 | 16 | 64 | .230 | 0 |
| SS | Derek Jeter | 148 | 593 | 119 | 201 | 15 | 73 | .339 | 22 |
| LF | Ricky Ledée | 62 | 191 | 23 | 46 | 7 | 31 | .241 | 7 |
| CF | Bernie Williams | 141 | 537 | 108 | 165 | 30 | 121 | .307 | 13 |
| RF | Paul O'Neill | 142 | 566 | 79 | 160 | 18 | 100 | .283 | 14 |
| DH | Shane Spencer | 73 | 248 | 33 | 70 | 9 | 40 | .282 | 1 |

==== Other batters ====
Note: G = Games played; AB = At bats; R = Runs; H = Hits; HR = Home run; RBI = Runs batted in; Avg. = Batting average; SB = Stolen bases

| Player | G | AB | R | H | HR | RBI | Avg. | SB |
|---|---|---|---|---|---|---|---|---|
| David Justice | 78 | 275 | 43 | 84 | 20 | 60 | .305 | 1 |
| Clay Bellinger | 98 | 184 | 33 | 38 | 6 | 21 | .207 | 5 |
| José Vizcaíno | 73 | 174 | 23 | 48 | 0 | 10 | .276 | 5 |
| Glenallen Hill | 40 | 132 | 22 | 44 | 16 | 29 | .333 | 0 |
| Luis Sojo | 34 | 125 | 19 | 36 | 2 | 17 | .288 | 1 |
| José Canseco | 37 | 111 | 16 | 27 | 6 | 19 | .243 | 0 |
| Chris Turner | 37 | 89 | 9 | 21 | 1 | 7 | .236 | 0 |
| Luis Polonia | 37 | 77 | 11 | 22 | 1 | 5 | .286 | 4 |
| Jim Leyritz | 24 | 55 | 2 | 12 | 1 | 4 | .218 | 0 |
| Alfonso Soriano | 22 | 50 | 5 | 9 | 2 | 3 | .180 | 2 |
| Ryan Thompson | 33 | 50 | 12 | 13 | 3 | 14 | .260 | 0 |
| Wilson Delgado | 31 | 45 | 6 | 11 | 1 | 4 | .244 | 1 |
| Lance Johnson | 18 | 30 | 6 | 9 | 0 | 2 | .300 | 2 |
| Félix José | 20 | 29 | 4 | 7 | 1 | 5 | .241 | 0 |
| Roberto Kelly | 10 | 25 | 4 | 3 | 1 | 1 | .120 | 0 |

=== Pitching ===
==== Starting pitchers ====
Note: G = Games pitched; IP = Innings pitched; W = Wins; L = Losses; ERA = Earned run average; CG = Complete games; SO = Strikeouts; BB = Walks allowed

| Player | G | IP | W | L | ERA | CG | SO | BB |
|---|---|---|---|---|---|---|---|---|
| Andy Pettitte | 32 | 204.2 | 19 | 9 | 4.35 | 3 | 125 | 80 |
| Roger Clemens | 32 | 204.1 | 13 | 8 | 3.70 | 1 | 188 | 84 |
| Orlando Hernández | 29 | 195.2 | 12 | 13 | 4.51 | 3 | 141 | 51 |
| David Cone | 30 | 155.0 | 4 | 14 | 6.91 | 0 | 120 | 82 |
| Denny Neagle | 16 | 91.1 | 15 | 9 | 4.52 | 1 | 58 | 31 |
| Ramiro Mendoza | 14 | 65.2 | 7 | 4 | 4.25 | 1 | 30 | 20 |

==== Other pitchers ====
Note: G = Games pitched; IP = Innings pitched; W = Wins; L = Losses; SV = Saves; ERA = Earned run average; SO = Strikeouts; BB = Walks allowed

| Player | G | IP | W | L | SV | ERA | SO | BB |
|---|---|---|---|---|---|---|---|---|
| Dwight Gooden | 18 | 64.1 | 4 | 2 | 2 | 3.36 | 31 | 21 |
| Todd Erdos | 14 | 25.0 | 0 | 0 | 1 | 5.04 | 18 | 11 |
| Ben Ford | 4 | 11.0 | 0 | 1 | 0 | 9.00 | 5 | 7 |
| Randy Keisler | 4 | 10.2 | 1 | 0 | 0 | 11.81 | 6 | 8 |
| Jake Westbrook | 3 | 6.2 | 0 | 2 | 0 | 13.50 | 1 | 4 |
| Ed Yarnall | 2 | 3.0 | 0 | 0 | 0 | 15.00 | 1 | 3 |

==== Relief pitchers ====
Note: G = Games pitched; IP = Innings pitched; W = Wins; L = Losses; SV = Saves; ERA = Earned run average; SO = Strikeouts; BB = Walks allowed

| Player | G | IP | W | L | SV | ERA | SO | BB |
|---|---|---|---|---|---|---|---|---|
| Mariano Rivera | 66 | 75.2 | 7 | 4 | 36 | 2.85 | 58 | 25 |
| Jeff Nelson | 73 | 69.2 | 8 | 4 | 0 | 2.45 | 71 | 45 |
| Mike Stanton | 69 | 68.0 | 2 | 3 | 0 | 4.10 | 75 | 24 |
| Jason Grimsley | 63 | 96.1 | 3 | 2 | 1 | 5.04 | 53 | 42 |
| Randy Choate | 22 | 17.0 | 0 | 1 | 0 | 4.76 | 12 | 8 |
| Allen Watson | 12 | 22.0 | 0 | 0 | 0 | 10.23 | 20 | 18 |
| Darrell Einertson | 11 | 12.2 | 0 | 0 | 0 | 3.55 | 3 | 4 |
| Craig Dingman | 10 | 11.0 | 0 | 0 | 0 | 6.55 | 8 | 3 |
| Ted Lilly | 7 | 8.0 | 0 | 0 | 0 | 5.63 | 11 | 5 |
| Jay Tessmer | 7 | 6.2 | 0 | 0 | 0 | 6.75 | 5 | 1 |

== Postseason ==
=== ALDS ===
New York wins the series, 3–2

| Game | Home | Score | Visitor | Score | Date | Series |
|---|---|---|---|---|---|---|
| 1 | Oakland | 5 | New York | 3 | October 3 | 1-0 (OAK) |
| 2 | Oakland | 0 | New York | 6 | October 4 | 1-1 |
| 3 | New York | 4 | Oakland | 2 | October 6 | 2-1 (NYY) |
| 4 | New York | 1 | Oakland | 11 | October 7 | 2-2 |
| 5 | Oakland | 5 | New York | 7 | October 8 | 3-2 (NYY) |

=== ALCS ===
- Seattle Mariners vs. New York Yankees

Yankees win the Series, 4–2

| Game | Score | Date | Location | Attendance |
|---|---|---|---|---|
| 1 | Seattle – 2, New York – 0 | October 10 | Yankee Stadium | 54,481 |
| 2 | Seattle – 1, New York – 7 | October 11 | Yankee Stadium | 55,317 |
| 3 | New York – 8, Seattle – 2 | October 13 | Safeco Field | 47,827 |
| 4 | New York – 5, Seattle – 0 | October 14 | Safeco Field | 47,803 |
| 5 | New York – 2, Seattle – 6 | October 15 | Safeco Field | 47,802 |
| 6 | Seattle – 7, New York – 9 | October 17 | Yankee Stadium | 56,598 |

=== World series ===
| Game | Date | Visitor | Score | Home | Score | Record (NYY-NYM) |
|---|---|---|---|---|---|---|
| 1 | October 21 | New York Mets | 3 | New York Yankees | 4 | 1-0 |
| 2 | October 22 | New York Mets | 5 | New York Yankees | 6 | 2-0 |
| 3 | October 24 | New York Yankees | 2 | New York Mets | 4 | 2-1 |
| 4 | October 25 | New York Yankees | 3 | New York Mets | 2 | 3-1 |
| 5 | October 26 | New York Yankees | 4 | New York Mets | 2 | 4-1 |

== Awards and honors ==
- Derek Jeter, SS, World Series Most Valuable Player, All-Star Game MVP
- David Justice, Outfielder, American League Championship Series MVP

== Farm system ==
| Level | Team | League | Manager |
|---|---|---|---|
| AAA | Columbus Clippers | International League | Trey Hillman |
| AA | Norwich Navigators | Eastern League | Dan Radison |
| A | Tampa Yankees | Florida State League | Tom Nieto |
| A | Greensboro Bats | South Atlantic League | Stan Hough |
| A-Short Season | Staten Island Yankees | New York–Penn League | Joe Arnold |
| Rookie | GCL Yankees | Gulf Coast League | Derek Shelton |

LEAGUE CHAMPIONS: Staten Island
