= 2000 Kansas City Royals season =

2000 Kansas City Royals
- League: American League
- Division: Central
- Ballpark: Kauffman Stadium
- City: Kansas City, Missouri
- Record: 77–85 (.475)
- Divisional place: 4th
- Owners: David Glass
- General managers: Herk Robinson, Allard Baird
- Managers: Tony Muser
- Television: KMBC-TV; KCWE; FSN Rocky Mountain (Paul Splittorff, Bob Davis)
- Radio: KMBZ (Denny Matthews, Ryan Lefebvre)

The 2000 Kansas City Royals season was the 32nd season for the franchise, and their 28th at Kauffman Stadium. They had a record of 77 wins and 85 losses, finishing fourth in the American League Central. The Royals failed to make the postseason for the 15th consecutive season.

== Offseason ==
- November 16, 1999: Izzy Molina was signed as a free agent by the Royals.
- December 10, 1999: Doug Bochtler was signed as a free agent with the Kansas City Royals.
- December 17, 1999: Scott Service was released by the Royals.
- January 27, 2000: Ricky Bottalico was signed as a free agent by the Royals.
- March 7, 2000: Gregg Zaun was sent to the Royals by the Detroit Tigers as part of a conditional deal.

== Regular season ==
- June 28, 2000: Pitcher Jay Witasick threw exactly three pitches and recorded three outs. This was accomplished in the second inning.

=== Opening Day roster ===
- Carlos Beltrán
- Johnny Damon
- Jermaine Dye
- Carlos Febles
- Brian Johnson
- Mark Quinn
- Joe Randa
- Rey Sánchez
- Mac Suzuki
- Mike Sweeney

=== Season standings ===
AL Central
Team	W	L	Pct.	GB	Home	Road
Chicago White Sox	95	67	.586	—	46‍–‍35	49‍–‍32
Cleveland Indians	90	72	.556	5	48‍–‍33	42‍–‍39
Detroit Tigers	79	83	.488	16	43‍–‍38	36‍–‍45
Kansas City Royals	77	85	.475	18	42‍–‍39	35‍–‍46
Minnesota Twins	69	93	.426	26	36‍–‍45	33‍–‍48

=== Record vs. opponents ===
2000 American League record Source: MLB Standings Grid – 2000
Team	ANA	BAL	BOS	CWS	CLE	DET	KC	MIN	NYY	OAK	SEA	TB	TEX	TOR	NL
Anaheim	—	7–5	5–4	4–6	3–6	5–5	6–6	7–3	5–5	5–8	5–8	6–6	7–5	5–7	12–6
Baltimore	5–7	—	5–7	4–6	5–4	6–4	3–7	6–3	5–7	4–8	3–7	8–5	6–6	7–6	7–11
Boston	4–5	7–5	—	7–5	6–6	7–5	4–6	8–2	6–7	5–5	5–5	6–6	7–3	4–8	9–9
Chicago	6–4	6–4	5–7	—	8–5	9–3	5–7	7–5	8–4	6–3	7–5	6–4	5–5	5–5	12–6
Cleveland	6–3	4–5	6–6	5–8	—	6–7	5–7	5–8	5–5	6–6	7–2	8–2	6–4	8–4	13–5
Detroit	5–5	4–6	5–7	3–9	7–6	—	5–7	7–6	8–4	6–4	7–2	4–5	5–5	3–9	10–8
Kansas City	6–6	7–3	6–4	7–5	7–5	7–5	—	7–5	2–8	4–8	4–8	5–5	3–7	4–6	8–10
Minnesota	3–7	3–6	2–8	5–7	8–5	6–7	5–7	—	5–5	5–7	3–9	4–6	8–4	5–4	7–11
New York	5–5	7–5	7–6	4–8	5–5	4–8	8–2	5–5	—	6–3	4–6	6–6	10–2	5–7	11–6
Oakland	8–5	8–4	5–5	3–6	6–6	4–6	8–4	7–5	3–6	—	9–4	7–2	5–7	7–3	11–7
Seattle	8–5	7–3	5–5	5–7	2–7	2–7	8–4	9–3	6–4	4–9	—	9–3	7–5	8–2	11–7
Tampa Bay	6–6	5–8	6–6	4–6	2–8	5–4	5–5	6–4	6–6	2–7	3–9	—	5–7	5–7	9–9
Texas	5–7	6–6	3–7	5–5	4–6	5–5	7–3	4–8	2–10	7–5	5–7	7–5	—	4–6	7–11
Toronto	7–5	6–7	8–4	5–5	4–8	9–3	6–4	4–5	7–5	3–7	2–8	7–5	6–4	—	9–9

=== Roster ===
2000 Kansas City Royals
Roster
Pitchers: 35 Miguel Batista; 39 Doug Bochtler; 52 Ricky Bottalico; 58 Tim Byrdak; 56 Jeff D'Amico; 33 Chad Durbin; 49 Chris Fussell; 54 Andy Larkin; 32 Brett Laxton; 59 Brian Meadows; 57 Scott Mullen; 57 Dan Murray; 31 Jason Rakers; 54 Dan Reichert; 30 Brad Rigby; 50 José Rosado; 46 José Santiago; 22 Paul Spoljaric; 48 Jerry Spradlin; 41 Blake Stein; 37 Jeff Suppan; 55 Mac Suzuki; 51 Kris Wilson; 47 Jay Witasick	Catchers: 2 Jorge Fábregas; 19 Brian Johnson; 22 Héctor Ortiz; 44 Gregg Zaun; Infielders: 19 Wilson Delgado; 3 Carlos Febles; 4 Ray Holbert; 6 David McCarty; 8 Luis Ordaz; 16 Joe Randa; 12 Jeff Reboulet; 1 Rey Sánchez; 29 Mike Sweeney	Outfielders: 36 Carlos Beltrán; 27 Dee Brown; 18 Johnny Damon; 17 Todd Dunwoody; 24 Jermaine Dye; 38 Scott Pose; 52 Mark Quinn	Manager: 40 Tony Muser; Coaches: 43 Tom Burgmeier (bullpen); 25 Rich Dauer (third base); 23 Lamar Johnson (hitting); 9 Jamie Quirk (bench); 30 Brent Strom (pitching); 20 Frank White (first base)

== Player stats ==
= Indicates team leader

= Indicates league leader

=== Batting ===
==== Starters by position ====
Note: Pos = Position; G = Games played; AB = At bats; H = Hits; R = Runs; HR = Home runs; RBI = Runs batted in; Avg. = Batting average; SB = Stolen Bases

Pos	Player	G	AB	H	R	HR	RBI	Avg.	SB
C	Gregg Zaun	83	234	64	36	7	33	.274	7
1B	Mike Sweeney	159	618	206	105	29	144	.333	8
2B	Carlos Febles	100	339	87	59	2	29	.257	17
3B	Joe Randa	158	612	186	88	15	106	.304	6
SS	Rey Sánchez	143	509	139	68	1	38	.273	7
LF	Mark Quinn	135	500	147	76	20	78	.294	5
CF	Carlos Beltrán	98	372	92	49	7	44	.247	13
RF	Jermaine Dye	157	601	193	107	33	118	.321	0
DH	Johnny Damon	159	655	214	136	16	88	.327	46

==== Other batters ====
Note: G = Games played; AB = At bats; H = Hits; HR = Home runs; RBI = Runs batted in; Avg. = Batting average

Player	G	AB	H	HR	RBI	Avg.
David McCarty	103	270	75	12	53	.278
Jeff Reboulet	66	182	44	0	14	.242
Todd Dunwoody	61	178	37	1	23	.208
Jorge Fábregas	43	142	40	3	17	.282
Brian Johnson	37	125	26	4	18	.208
Luis Ordaz	65	104	23	0	11	.221
Héctor Ortiz	26	88	34	0	5	.386
Wilson Delgado	33	83	22	0	7	.265
Scott Pose	47	48	9	0	1	.188
Dee Brown	15	25	4	0	4	.160
Ray Holbert	3	4	1	0	0	.250

=== Pitching ===
==== Starting pitchers ====
Note: G = Games pitched; IP = Innings pitched; W = Wins; L = Losses; ERA = Earned run average; SO = Strikeouts

Player	G	IP	W	L	ERA	SO
Jeff Suppan	35	217.0	10	9	4.94	128
Mac Suzuki	32	188.2	8	10	4.34	135
Blake Stein	17	107.2	8	5	4.68	78
Chad Durbin	16	72.1	2	5	8.21	37
Brian Meadows	11	71.2	6	2	4.77	26
José Rosado	5	27.2	2	2	5.86	15

==== Other pitchers ====
Note: G = Games pitched; IP = Innings pitched; W = Wins; L = Losses; ERA = Earned run average; SO = Strikeouts

Player	G	IP	W	L	ERA	SO
Dan Reichert	44	153.1	8	10	4.70	94
Jay Witasick	22	89.1	3	8	5.94	67
Chris Fussell	20	70.0	5	3	6.30	46
Miguel Batista	14	57.0	2	6	7.74	30
Brett Laxton	6	16.2	0	1	8.10	14
Jeff D'Amico	7	13.2	0	1	9.22	9

==== Relief pitchers ====
Note: G = Games pitched; W = Wins; L = Losses; SV = Saves; ERA = Earned run average; SO = Strikeouts

Player	G	W	L	SV	ERA	SO
Ricky Bottalico	62	9	6	16	4.83	56
Jerry Spradlin	50	4	4	7	5.52	54
José Santiago	45	8	6	2	3.91	44
Kris Wilson	20	0	1	0	4.19	17
Andy Larkin	18	0	3	1	8.84	17
Paul Spoljaric	13	0	0	0	6.52	6
Tim Byrdak	12	0	1	0	11.37	8
Jason Rakers	11	2	0	0	9.14	16
Scott Mullen	11	0	0	0	4.35	7
Dan Murray	10	0	0	0	4.66	16
Doug Bochtler	6	0	2	0	6.48	4
Brad Rigby	4	0	0	1	16.20	3

== Awards and honors ==
All-Star Game

- Jermaine Dye, Outfield, Starter
- Mike Sweeney, 1B, Reserve

== Farm system ==
Level	Team	League	Manager
AAA	Omaha Golden Spikes	Pacific Coast League	John Mizerock
AA	Wichita Wranglers	Texas League	Keith Bodie
A	Wilmington Blue Rocks	Carolina League	Jeff Garber
A	Charleston Alley Cats	South Atlantic League	Joe Szekely
A-Short Season	Spokane Indians	Northwest League	Tom Poquette
Rookie	GCL Royals	Gulf Coast League	Ron Karkovice and Andre David
