= Nashua Pride =

- 1998–2009; Nashua, New Hampshire
Team logo
Cap insignia

Minor league affiliations
- Class: Independent (1998–2009)
- League: Can-Am League (2006–2009); Atlantic League (1998–2005)

Minor league titles
- League titles (2): 2000; 2007
- Division titles (1): 2000

Team data
- Name: American Defenders of New Hampshire (2009); Nashua Pride (1997-2008)
- Colors: Blue, gold, white
- Mascot: Shag the Tiger, Monkey Boy, Stitch the Baseball
- Ballpark: Holman Stadium (1998–2009)
- Owner/ Operator: John Stabile II
- General manager: Chris Hall
- Manager: Rick Miller
- Media: Nashua Telegraph

The Nashua Pride was a professional baseball team based in Nashua, New Hampshire, in the United States, not affiliated with Major League Baseball. They played home games at Holman Stadium from 1998 through 2008, when they were sold and renamed the American Defenders of New Hampshire. In 2010 that team moved to Pittsfield, Massachusetts, and became the Pittsfield Colonials. The franchise itself no longer exists, as the Colonials folded after the 2011 baseball season.

== History ==
The Nashua Pride was one of the founding members of the Atlantic League of Professional Baseball in 1998. The team name was based on the fact that Money magazine twice named Nashua the "best place to live" in the America. The team's primary home uniform logo was the word "Pride" in script, and included the number "1" inside the capital "P."

In the 2000 season, the team swept the Somerset Patriots in three games to win the Atlantic League Championship Series. However, the Patriots answered that loss by defeating the Pride in the 2003 and 2005 championships. Despite their on-field success, the Pride suffered as a result of having one of the lowest average attendances and being the farthest team from the core of the league.

In 2006, the team moved to the Canadian American Association of Professional Baseball, (Can-Am League). As Nashua is closer in proximity to the teams of the Can-Am League than those of the Atlantic, the Pride was relieved of the expensive travel to away games.

In 2007, the Pride won the Can-Am League championship. After that season, long-time manager Butch Hobson left the Pride to take the managerial job with the Southern Maryland Blue Crabs of the Atlantic League, while former Boston Red Sox outfielder Rick Miller was hired as manager in Nashua. Former Boston Red Sox firstbaseman/outfielder Brian Daubach was hired as the hitting coach midway through the 2008 season.

American skier Bode Miller played one home game each year for the team in 2006, 2007, and 2008. Former Red Sox reliever Rich "El Guapo" Garces appeared in the Pride bullpen in 2007 and 2008.

== Sale of the Pride ==
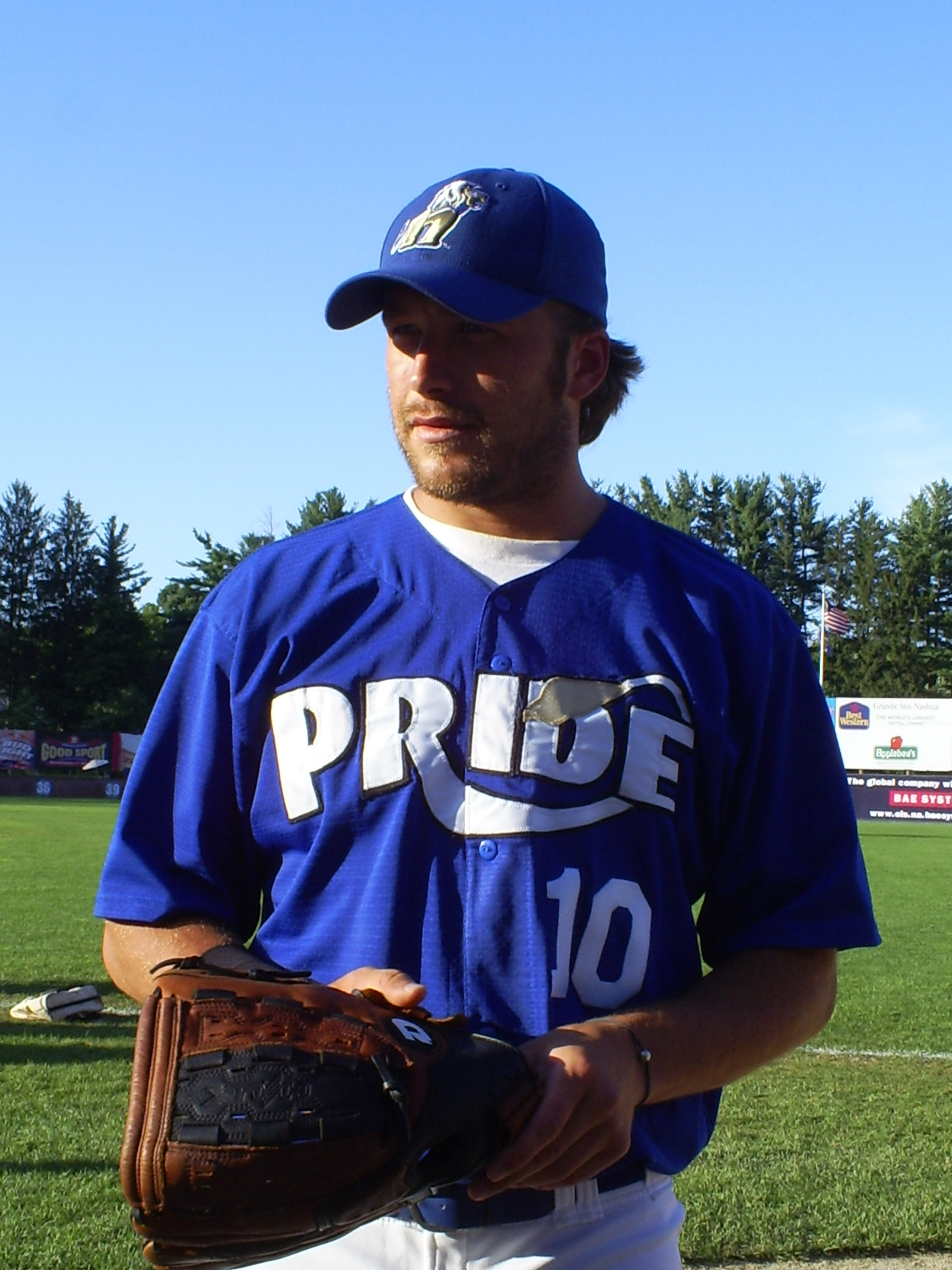
Bode Miller playing for the Nashua Pride

Following the 2008 season, when the Pride lost an estimated $500,000, former owner John Stabile sold the team to the American Defenders of New Hampshire, LLC. Stabile, a Nashua resident, had bought the team in January 2006 to prevent it from relocating, and got assurances from the new owners that they would keep the team in Nashua.

American Defenders of New Hampshire, LLC consisted of Nokona executives Buddy Lewis and Jerry O'Connor, former Boston Red Sox general manager Dan Duquette, and Terry Allvord.

The new owners changed the club's name from the Nashua Pride to the American Defenders of New Hampshire, placing less of an emphasis on the Nashua market. They kept General Manager Chris Hall and promoted Brian Daubach from Hitting Coach to Manager.

The team was evicted from Holman Stadium in Nashua midway through the 2009 season because of nonpayment of rent.

== Nashua baseball history ==
The Pride was one of several professional teams to play in Nashua, and one of five to have played at Holman Stadium:

- 1895: Nashua Rainmakers, New England Association
- 1901-1905: Nashua, New England League - B
- 1926-1927: Nashua Millionaires, New England League - B
- 1929-1930: Nashua Millionaires, New England League - B
- 1933: Nashua, New England League - B
- 1946-1949: Nashua Dodgers, New England League - B
- 1983: Nashua Angels, Eastern League - AA
- 1984-1986: Nashua Pirates, Eastern League - AA
- 1995-1996: Nashua Hawks, North Atlantic League - independent
- 1998-2005: Nashua Pride, Atlantic League - independent
- 2006-2008: Nashua Pride, Can-Am League - independent
- 2009: American Defenders of New Hampshire, Can-Am League - independent

== World Famous Monkey Boy ==
During their inaugural season, Chris "Monkey Boy" Ames became the secondary mascot performer for the Nashua Pride. Originally intended to only be present for the first home stand, Monkey Boy became a crowd favorite and was made a permanent mascot for the remainder of the season. Monkey Boy remained with the team until Ames suffered a torn ACL in 2002. Known for his high-energy antics, comedic performances, and fan engagement, Ames portrayed Monkey Boy, a beloved character who entertained crowds at Holman Stadium throughout the team's tenure. In 2011, Monkey Boy returned for a one night only playoff appearance with the team (Now Nashua Silver Knights) Ames was tackled by a member of the Martha's Vineyard Sharks, injuring Ames and effectively ending his career with Nashua.

After becoming a cult favorite with baseball fans in Nashua, Barstool Sports produced a comedic documentary around the Monkey Boy character and Ames. Following the history, memories and eventual return of the mascot to Holman Stadium in 2022.

== Notable Pride alumni ==
- Mike Easler (Manager) - 1998
- Brendan Donnelly - 1999
- Curtis Pride - 1999, 2003, 2004
- Sam Horn - 2000, 2001
- Paxton Crawford - 2003
- Dante Bichette - 2004
- Jeff Juden - 2004
- Darren Bragg - 2005
- Orlando Miller - 2005
- Jeff Sparks - 2005
- Rich Garces - 2007, 2008
- Butch Hobson (Manager) - 2000-2007
- Brian Daubach (Hitting Coach) 2008
- Bode Miller - 2006, 2007

Achievements
Preceded by Québec Capitales; 2006	Can-Am League Champions; Nashua Pride; 2007	Succeeded by Sussex Skyhawks; 2008
Preceded by Bridgeport Bluefish; 1999	Atlantic League Champions; Nashua Pride; 2000	Succeeded by Somerset Patriots; 2001

Achievements
Preceded by Long Island Ducks; 2004	North Division Champions; Nashua Pride; 2005	Succeeded by Bridgeport Bluefish; 2006
Preceded by Bridgeport Bluefish; 2002	North Division Champions; Nashua Pride; 2003	Succeeded by Long Island Ducks; 2004
Preceded by North Division Created	North Division Champions; Nashua Pride; 2000	Succeeded by Newark Bears; 2001
