= Dan Reichert =

American baseball player (born 1976)

Lincoln Saltdogs – No. 38
- Pitcher / Coach
- Born: July 12, 1976 (age 50); Monterey, California, U.S.
- Batted: Right Threw: Right

Professional debut
- MLB: July 16, 1999, for the Kansas City Royals
- CPBL: March 26, 2011, for the Uni-President 7-Eleven Lions

Last appearance
- MLB: September 25, 2003, for the Toronto Blue Jays
- CPBL: September 28, 2011, for the Uni-President 7-Eleven Lions

MLB statistics
- Win–loss record: 21–25
- Earned run average: 5.55
- Strikeouts: 240

CPBL statistics
- Win–loss record: 12–10
- Earned run average: 3.66
- Strikeouts: 95
- Stats at Baseball Reference

Teams
- Kansas City Royals (1999–2002); Toronto Blue Jays (2003); Uni-President 7-Eleven Lions (2011)

Career highlights and awards
- Taiwan Series champion (2011)

Daniel Robert Reichert (/ˈraɪkərt/; born July 12, 1976) is an American former professional baseball pitcher. He played in Major League Baseball (MLB) for the Kansas City Royals and Toronto Blue Jays. Reichert pitched at Turlock High School in Turlock, California, and then became a star pitcher for University of the Pacific. He is currently the pitching coach for the Lincoln Saltdogs of the American Association of Professional Baseball.

== Career ==
In 1994, the St. Louis Cardinals drafted Reichert in the 11th round, 306th overall, but he did not sign, choosing to go to play in college at the University of the Pacific. In 1995 and 1996, he played collegiate summer baseball with the Bourne Braves of the Cape Cod Baseball League. In 1997, he was the Big West Conference Pitcher of the Year, a First Team College All-American and a Big West Conference All-Star and was drafted by the Kansas City Royals in the 1st round (7th overall). He signed for a $1.45 million bonus and spent less than three seasons in the minors, where he saw much success before getting the call to the big leagues. In 1999, he was a Triple-A All-Star. On July 16, 1999, at the age of 23, he made his major league debut with the Kansas City Royals. He finished his debut season with an ERA of 9.08.

The main criticism against Reichert had always been his control, or lack thereof. In 1999, Reichert walked 32 and struck out only 20 in just over 36 innings. When Reichert is "on", he can dominate by inducing multiple groundballs. According to one source: "He's got a nice moving fastball that tops out in the low-90s. He likes to work low in the zone and give his infielders some work. [He is a] borderline big-league reliever [because] he tries to be too fancy, [and] it backfires on him, because he doesn't have a lot of fancy pitches to work with after the fastball." In 2000, Reichert led the league with 18 wild pitches in only 153+ innings.

The last Reichert has seen of the majors was in 2003 with the Toronto Blue Jays. Since then, he has been bouncing around in the Milwaukee Brewers and Seattle Mariners organizations. During the 2007 baseball season, he was pitching for the independent Nashua Pride and the Lincoln Saltdogs.

On May 30, 2008, Reichert signed a minor league contract with the Cleveland Indians and played for the Buffalo Bisons of the International League. On July 10, Reichert was traded to the Pittsburgh Pirates. He became a free agent at the end of the season.

In 2009, he played with the Bridgeport Bluefish.

Reichert served as pitching coach for the Lincoln Saltdogs in 2013–2014 and resumed the role in 2016.

== Personal life ==
In 1998, Reichert was diagnosed with diabetes. He currently resides in Nebraska. He has 2 children, Jackson and Lucas.
