= Rich Garcés =

Venezuelan baseball player (born 1971)

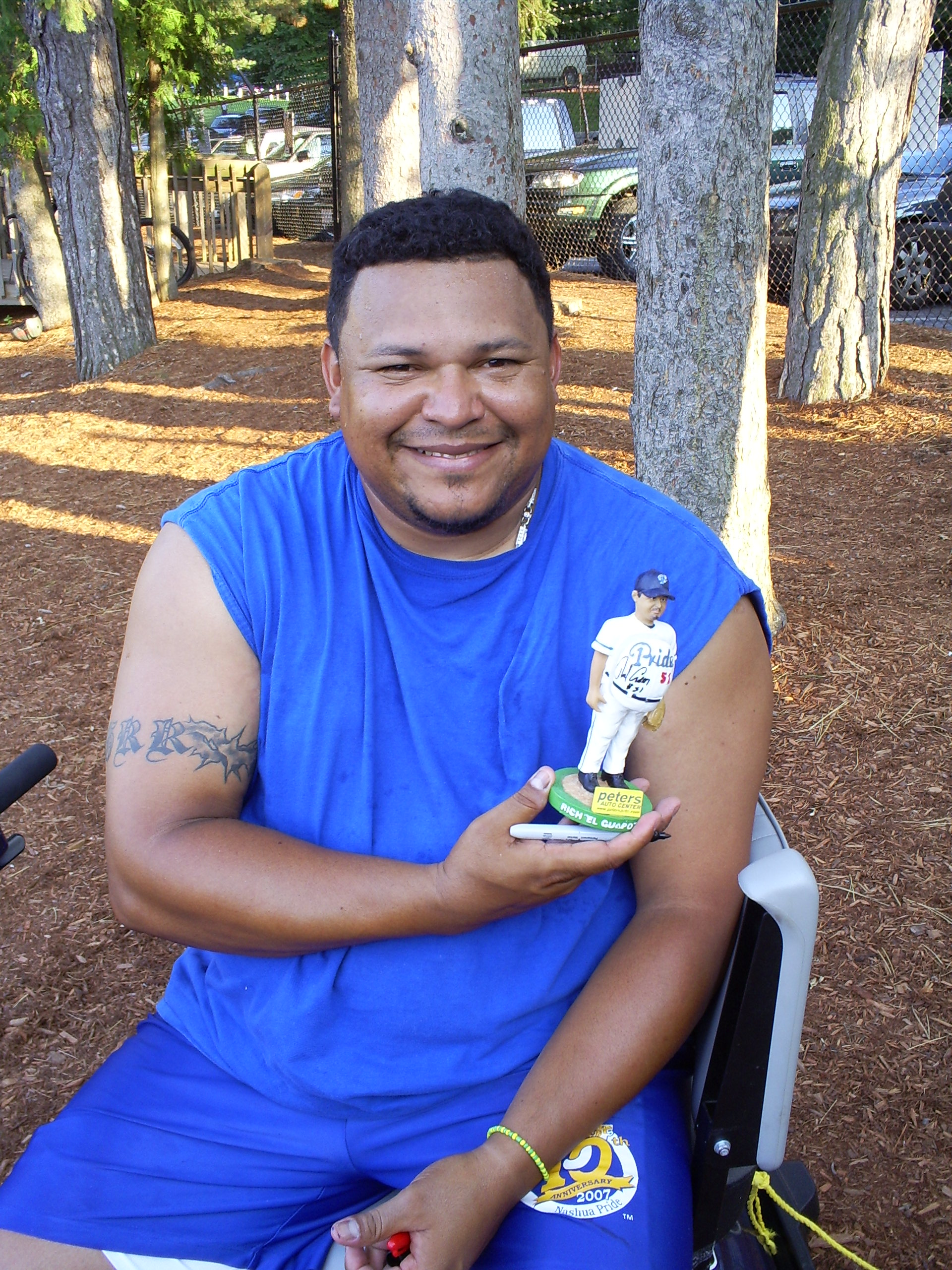
- Garcés holding a Rich Garces bobble belly that was given away at a Nashua Pride Game
- Relief pitcher
- Born: May 18, 1971 (age 55); Maracay, Venezuela
- Batted: Right Threw: Right

MLB debut
- September 18, 1990, for the Minnesota Twins

Last MLB appearance
- July 20, 2002, for the Boston Red Sox

MLB statistics
- Win–loss record: 23–10
- Earned run average: 3.74
- Strikeouts: 296
- Stats at Baseball Reference

Teams
- Minnesota Twins (1990, 1993); Chicago Cubs (1995); Florida Marlins (1995); Boston Red Sox (1996–2002)

Member of the Venezuelan

Baseball Hall of Fame
- Induction: 2024
- Vote: 78%
- Election method: Contemporary Committee

Richard Alan Garcés Mendoza, Jr. [gar-CESS] (born May 18, 1971) is a Venezuelan former right-handed relief pitcher in Major League Baseball. Nicknamed "El Guapo" (The handsome one), he played with the Minnesota Twins (1990, 1993), Chicago Cubs (1995), Florida Marlins (1995) and Boston Red Sox (1996–2002). More recently, he's spent time coaching at various programs in the Connecticut area.

== Career ==
Garcés was signed by Minnesota as an amateur free agent in 1987. After stints with the Twins, Cubs and Marlins, he pitched for the Red Sox, turning into one of the American League's premier setup men. He quickly became a favorite among Red Sox fans, as much for his large size as his performance. His weight was listed at 215 lbs, although it is widely believed to have been significantly higher. The Red Sox asked Garcés to lose weight over an off-season, which he did. His numbers were never the same after that, however, leading many to believe the drastic weight loss negatively affected his mechanics.

In 1999, Garcés posted a 5–1 record with 33 strikeouts, a 1.55 earned run average, and two saves. This was followed with a mark of 8–1, 69 SO, 3.25 ERA, and one save in 2000.

Although only 31 years old in 2002, Garcés' performance displayed a much-weakened arm strength. After his disappointing ERA of 7.59 in 21 innings, he was released by Boston. On January 22, 2003, he signed with the Colorado Rockies as a free agent, but he was released in March 2003 before the regular season started.

In a ten-year career, Garcés compiled a 23–10 record with a 3.74 ERA, seven saves, 53 holds, 296 strikeouts, 164 walks, and 341 1/3 innings pitched in 287 games, holding opponents to a .227 batting average.

In June 2005, Garcés signed a minor league contract with the Red Sox, pitched in the Gulf Coast League for the Gulf Coast Red Sox. He was released in October 2005.

Garcés played for the Venezuelan Professional Winter League in 2006, finishing 3–1 with 11 saves and a 2.31 ERA in 24 appearances for the Aguilas del Zulia. Based on this performance, Garcés signed a contract in February 2007 to pitch for the Nashua Pride (of the independent Can-Am League) with the hope of working his way back to the major leagues. He served as a relief pitcher for the Pride in 2007 and 2008.

On November 1, 2024, Garcés was elected to the Venezuelan Baseball Hall of Fame, receiving 78% of the votes from the Contemporary Committee.

== Coaching ==
In recent years, Garcés has spent time coaching in various baseball programs around the Connecticut area. In 2017 he was the pitching coach for the Bridgeport Bluefish. In November 2020 he joined the staff of the CT Edge Baseball Academy. In 2022 he worked as the Pitching Coordinator for the CT Mets, and also worked with Gap2Gap Baseball.

== See also ==
- List of Major League Baseball players from Venezuela
