= Darrell Einertson =

American baseball player (born 1972)

- Pitcher
- Born: September 4, 1972 (age 54); Rhinelander, Wisconsin
- Batted: Right Threw: Right

MLB debut
- April 15, 2000, for the New York Yankees

Last MLB appearance
- July 27, 2000, for the New York Yankees

MLB statistics
- Win–loss record: 0–0
- ERA: 3.55
- Strikeouts: 3
- Stats at Baseball Reference

Teams
- New York Yankees (2000)

Darrell Lee Einertson (born September 4, 1972) is a former Major League Baseball pitcher. Einertson played for the New York Yankees in the 2000 season. In eleven career games, he had a 0-0 record with a 3.55 ERA. He also had three strikeouts.

Einertson was drafted by the Yankees in the 11th round of the 1995 amateur draft.
