= Curtis Pride =

Deaf American baseball player (born 1968)

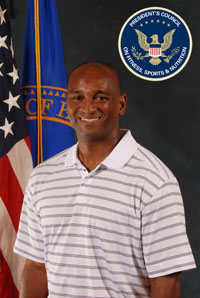
- Pride with The President's Council on Fitness, Sports and Nutrition in 2011
- Coach / Outfielder
- Born: December 17, 1968 (age 57); Washington D.C., U.S.
- Batted: Left Threw: Right

MLB debut
- September 14, 1993, for the Montreal Expos

Last MLB appearance
- October 1, 2006, for the Los Angeles Angels of Anaheim

MLB statistics
- Batting average: .250
- Home runs: 20
- Runs batted in: 82
- Stats at Baseball Reference

Teams
- As player: Montreal Expos (1993, 1995); Detroit Tigers (1996–1997); Boston Red Sox (1997); Atlanta Braves (1998); Boston Red Sox (2000); Montreal Expos (2001); New York Yankees (2003); Anaheim Angels / Los Angeles Angels of Anaheim (2004–2006); As manager: Gallaudet (2009–2024)

Curtis John Pride (born December 17, 1968) is an American former professional baseball outfielder who is deaf. He batted left-handed and threw right-handed, and played in Major League Baseball (MLB) from 1993 to 2006 for the Montreal Expos, Boston Red Sox, Detroit Tigers, Atlanta Braves, New York Yankees, and Anaheim Angels / Los Angeles Angels of Anaheim. In 2015, Pride was named MLB's Ambassador For Inclusion. Since 2009, Pride has been the head baseball coach at Gallaudet University.

== Youth ==
Deaf at birth from rubella, Pride developed oral skills early in his life and graduated from John F. Kennedy High School in Silver Spring, Maryland. He excelled in baseball, basketball, and soccer in high school. After high school, Curtis Pride attended the College of William and Mary. He was the starting point guard on the basketball team. He also was an excellent soccer player who played for the United States at the 1985 FIFA U-16 World Championship in China and scored two goals in the tournament, including the match winner against Bolivia. He was named one of the top 15 youth prospects in the world for that year and was a 1986 Parade Magazine High School All American soccer player. Pride uses his 5% residual hearing to help him speak and is a fluent lip-reader.

== Playing career ==
Pride was originally signed by the New York Mets, but reached the major leagues in 1993 with the Montreal Expos after playing in the minor leagues that year with the Harrisburg Senators and Ottawa Lynx. At that time, he became the first deaf player in the majors since Dick Sipek in 1945. A left-handed hitter, with good plate discipline, and considerable speed, he never played regularly in the majors. Instead, he pinch hit or played in the outfield, usually left or right, as an injury replacement, and was regarded as an excellent fielder with a strong arm. His first Major League hit was September 17, 1993 in Montreal. Pride's first four hits in his major league career were a double, triple, home run, and single.

Pride became a free agent before the 1996 season and signed with the Detroit Tigers, where he played well in a part-time outfield role. With fewer than 300 plate appearances in 95 games, he compiled career-high numbers in batting average (.300), home runs (10), RBI (31), runs (52), hits (80), doubles (17) triples (5), and stolen bases (11). He was expected to gain more at bats in future seasons as a result. But 1997 found him on the disabled list and he was released and signed by the Boston Red Sox. After that, he played with the Atlanta Braves, returned to Boston and Montreal, and saw a little action with the New York Yankees. He was signed by the Anaheim Angels in the 2004 season and was called up from Triple-A Salt Lake Stingers. He pinch hit in two playoff games for the Angels that year. In 2005, he was signed to a minor league contract with the Angels and was called up after an injury to Vladimir Guerrero. He was returned to the minors after Guerrero recovered from the injury. After spending 2007 spring training as a non-roster invitee for the Angels, he was assigned to start the season as a member of the Salt Lake Bees.

Pride signed with the Southern Maryland Blue Crabs of the independent Atlantic League on April 15, 2008. He was released by the Blue Crabs on August 23, 2008.

In an eleven-season major league career, Pride batted .250 (199-for-796) with 20 home runs and 82 RBI in 421 major league games.

== Coaching career ==
In 2008, Pride was selected to be the baseball coach at Gallaudet University, a school for the deaf. He remained head coach until 2024, when the university ended their baseball program. In the summer of 2011, he served as assistant coach for the Wareham Gatemen of the Cape Cod Baseball League.

== Personal life ==
Pride and his wife Lisa are involved in the Together With Pride foundation, which aids hard-of-hearing children through a hearing aid bank, according to the foundation's website. There are several activities the foundation supports or hopes to support, such as a scholarship program, literacy, and mentoring.

In 1996, Pride received the Tony Conigliaro Award, given annually to an MLB player who best overcomes adversity through the attributes of spirit, determination, and courage. In 2016, he won the Henry Viscardi Achievement Award. Pride keeps homes in both the Washington, D.C. area and Wellington, Florida.

He co-authored with Doug Ward I Felt the Cheers: The Remarkable Silent Life of Curtis Pride which was released in February 2025.
