= Wilson Delgado =

Dominican baseball player (born 1972)

- Shortstop
- Born: July 15, 1972 (age 54); San Cristobal, Dominican Republic
- Batted: Switch Threw: Right

MLB debut
- September 24, 1996, for the San Francisco Giants

Last MLB appearance
- October 3, 2004, for the New York Mets

MLB statistics
- Batting average: .251
- Home runs: 5
- Runs batted in: 43
- Stats at Baseball Reference

Teams
- San Francisco Giants (1996–1999); New York Yankees (2000); Kansas City Royals (2000–2001); St. Louis Cardinals (2002–2003); Anaheim Angels (2003); New York Mets (2004)

Wilson Delgado Durán (born July 15, 1972) is a Dominican former professional baseball player who played shortstop in the major leagues from 1996-2004.

== Career ==
Delgado was originally signed in 1992 by the Seattle Mariners, but was traded in 1995 with Shawn Estes to the San Francisco Giants for Salomón Torres.

Delgado made his debut with the Giants in 1996 and played with them through 1999, compiling a .259 average over 124 plate appearances. In March 2000, Delgado was traded again, this time to the New York Yankees for Juan Melo. Delgado played in 31 games for the Yankees, before being traded in August to the Kansas City Royals for Nick Ortiz.

Delgado finished out the 2000 season with the Royals and spent all of 2001 with them, hitting .120 in 14 games. He then spent the next two seasons with the St. Louis Cardinals, hitting .175 in 55 games before the Anaheim Angels purchased his contract in 2003. He hit .320 in 58 games for the Angels, before finishing up his career with the New York Mets, hitting .292 in 42 games in 2004.

Delgado was drug tested and was found positive twice according to the https://www.baseball-reference.com/blog/steroids-in-sports.html

== Suspension from MLB ==
In 2005, Delgado was suspended 30 games for using a banned substance and violating the Minor League drug policy.
