= Paxton Crawford =

American baseball player (born 1977)

- Pitcher
- Born: August 4, 1977 (age 48); Little Rock, Arkansas, U.S.
- Batted: Right Threw: Right

MLB debut
- July 1, 2000, for the Boston Red Sox

Last MLB appearance
- June 6, 2001, for the Boston Red Sox

MLB statistics
- Win–loss record: 5–1
- Earned run average: 4.15
- Strikeouts: 42
- Stats at Baseball Reference

Teams
- Boston Red Sox (2000–2001)

Paxton Keith Crawford (born August 4, 1977) is an American former professional baseball player. He played in Major League Baseball for the Boston Red Sox from 2000 to 2001.

== Professional career ==
Crawford was drafted in 1995 by the Boston Red Sox and worked as a reliever and spot starter for the team in the 2000 and 2001 seasons. After the 2002 season, which he spent in the minors, he became a free agent and signed briefly with the Oakland Athletics in 2003 and the Cincinnati Reds in 2004, but never made another appearance in the major leagues.

Crawford is most remembered in Boston for suffering an unusual injury in July 2000 just prior to an expected recall to the Red Sox from their Pawtucket Red Sox AAA affiliate. A day after pitching a seven-inning no-hitter, he allegedly rolled off a hotel bed in Ottawa and landed on a glass that he had left on the floor. The injury required eight stitches.

== Steroid use admission ==
On June 21, 2006, in an ESPN The Magazine article by Amy K. Nelson, Crawford, who by then was out of baseball, admitted to using the steroids Deca-Durabolin and Winstrol, human growth hormone and amphetamines from 1999 to 2001. In the article, Paxton claims that other Red Sox players used and "openly encouraged him to use" drugs and even laughed "when he spilled needles in front of his locker". Current members of the Red Sox who played with Crawford and many former Red Sox players have criticized Crawford and denied that there was an open drug culture in the locker room. However, during the 2000 season, police investigated Red Sox infielder Manny Alexander after they discovered steroids and syringes during a search of his car during a traffic stop.

Crawford's name appeared in the Mitchell Report, released on December 13, 2007, as a result of his admitted use of performance-enhancing drugs. The committee requested Crawford appear for an interview but he declined stating "that he did not 'do that stuff anymore,' that he was sorry he had used those substances in the past and that he just wanted to be left alone."

Crawford made 15 appearances with Boston between 2000 and 2001, going 5–1 with a 4.15 ERA. His major-league career ended shortly after he suffered a stress fracture in his lower back in June 2001 and had shoulder surgery in February 2002. The Red Sox released him in October 2002. Crawford also said, continuous pain was also a cause of his steroid use.

In August 2004, Crawford was suspended for 15 days for violating the league's alcohol and drug abuse policy while playing for the Chattanooga Lookouts, the Double A affiliate of the Cincinnati Reds. In 2004, he made 18 relief appearances for Chattanooga, compiling a 3.93 ERA and a 1–1 record. He made 18 starts in the 2005 season for the independent Long Island Ducks, going 8–8 with an ERA of 4.22.

== See also ==
- List of Major League Baseball players named in the Mitchell Report
