= Chris Fussell =

American baseball player (born 1976)

- Pitcher
- Born: May 19, 1976 (age 50); Oregon, Ohio, U.S.
- Batted: Right Threw: Right

MLB debut
- September 19, 1998, for the Baltimore Orioles

Last MLB appearance
- September 15, 2000, for the Kansas City Royals

MLB statistics
- Win–loss record: 5–9
- Earned run average: 6.90
- Strikeouts: 91
- Stats at Baseball Reference

Teams
- Baltimore Orioles (1998); Kansas City Royals (1999–2000)

Christopher Wren Fussell (born May 19, 1976) is an American former professional baseball pitcher. He played in Major League Baseball (MLB) for the Baltimore Orioles and Kansas City Royals.

== Career ==
=== Baltimore Orioles ===
After attending Clay High School, Fussell was drafted in the ninth round of the 1994 Major League Baseball draft by the Baltimore Orioles; he signed with the team on June 14, 1994.

Fussell began his professional career with the rookie-level Gulf Coast League Orioles in 1994 and began a slow, but steady, rise through the Orioles farm system. The rise included stops with the rookie-level Bluefield Orioles, High-A Frederick Keys, Double-A Bowie Baysox, and Triple-A Rochester Red Wings.

Fussell made his major league baseball debut with the Orioles September 15, 1998, pitching five innings as the starting pitcher against the Texas Rangers. He gave up three runs and did not get a decision in the game. Fussell pitched in two more games for the Orioles during his rookie campaign, finishing with an 0–1 record and 8.38 ERA with eight strikeouts in 9 2/3 innings pitched.

=== Kansas City Royals ===
On April 2, 1999, Fussell was traded to the Kansas City Royals in exchange for Jeff Conine. He spent most of the next two seasons on the Royals' roster, primarily as a reliever with occasional starts. In 2001, Fussell had surgery to remove bone spurs in his right elbow. He returned to the Royals in 2002 and spent the spring in big league camp, and the regular season with the Triple-A Omaha Storm Chasers.

=== Later career ===
After his release from the Houston Astros organization in 2005, Fussell played with the Camden Riversharks of the Atlantic League of Professional Baseball. After parts of three seasons with Camden, the Los Angeles Dodgers signed Fussell to provide bullpen depth for their Triple-A affiliate, the Las Vegas 51s in 2007.

== Personal life ==
Fussell has a chapter giving advice in Tim Ferriss' book Tools of Titans.
