= Pete Schourek =

American baseball player (born 1969)

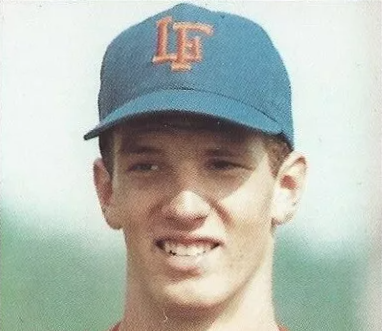
- Schourek with the Little Falls Mets c. 1988
- Pitcher
- Born: May 10, 1969 (age 57); Austin, Texas, U.S.
- Batted: Left Threw: Left

MLB debut
- April 9, 1991, for the New York Mets

Last MLB appearance
- July 25, 2001, for the Boston Red Sox

MLB statistics
- Win–loss record: 66–77
- Earned run average: 4.59
- Strikeouts: 813
- Stats at Baseball Reference

Teams
- New York Mets (1991–1993); Cincinnati Reds (1994–1997); Boston Red Sox (1998); Houston Astros (1998); Pittsburgh Pirates (1999); Boston Red Sox (2000–2001)

Peter Alan Schourek (born May 10, 1969) is an American former Major League Baseball left-handed pitcher who played for the New York Mets, Cincinnati Reds, Houston Astros, Boston Red Sox, and Pittsburgh Pirates from 1991 to 2001. He was the runner-up for the National League's Cy Young Award in 1995.

Schourek grew up in Falls Church, Virginia in the Washington Metropolitan Area and attended George C. Marshall High School in Falls Church (Fairfax County).

In 1995 Schourek posted an 18-7 record with a 3.22 ERA. He gave up 2 runs in 14 1/3 IP in the postseason (1.26 ERA), but took an 0-1 record in 2 starts. He was the runner-up for the NL Cy Young Award, losing to Greg Maddux.
