= Bridgeport Bluefish =

Minor league professional baseball team in Bridgeport, Connecticut, United States

- 1997–2017; Bridgeport, Connecticut
Team logo
Cap insignia

Minor league affiliations
- Class: Independent (1997–2017)
- League: Atlantic League of Professional Baseball (1997–2017)
- Division: Liberty Division

Minor league titles
- League titles (1): 1999
- Division titles (5): 1998; 1999; 2002; 2006; 2010

Team data
- Name: Bridgeport Bluefish (1997–2017)
- Colors: Navy blue, teal, silver, white
- Ballpark: The Ballpark at Harbor Yard (1997–2017)
- Owner/ Operator: Frank Boulton
- General manager: Paul Herrmann
- Media: Connecticut Post

The Bridgeport Bluefish were an American minor league baseball team based in Bridgeport, Connecticut. The team was a member of the Liberty Division of the Atlantic League of Professional Baseball, which was not affiliated with Major League Baseball. They played their home games at The Ballpark at Harbor Yard from 1998 to 2017.

The franchise had announced it would relocate to High Point, North Carolina, in 2019, but ceased operations instead. In its place, a new franchise not connected to the Bluefish began play in High Point called the High Point Rockers.

== History of Bridgeport baseball ==
The game of baseball was first played in Bridgeport, Connecticut soon after the Civil War ended. Teams that called the city home included the Victors, Soubrettes, Orators, Crossmen, Mechanics, Hustlers, Bolts, Americans, Bees, and Bears. Bridgeport was the home of Major Leaguer James "Orator" O'Rourke, who signed the first African-American to play for a professional baseball team in 1895.

Visiting Major League and Negro league teams often played exhibition games in the shadow of the Bridgeport's smokestacks. The last affiliated minor league baseball team, the Bridgeport Bees, played in the Interstate League and the Colonial League from 1941 to 1950. Professional baseball was not played in Bridgeport for about another half-century, until the arrival of the Bluefish in 1998.

=== Bridgeport Bluefish ===
The first game of the Bridgeport Bluefish was May 21, 1998. The team has been to five Atlantic League Championship Series. It won in 1999 against the Somerset Patriots and lost to Atlantic City in 1998, Newark in 2002, Lancaster in 2006, and York in 2010.

Some of the former major leaguers who have worn Bluefish jerseys include Endy Chávez, Shea Hillenbrand, Alex Hinshaw, José Offerman, Edgardo Alfonzo, Deivi Cruz, Junior Spivey, Quinton McCracken, Antonio Alfonseca, Willy Mo Pena, Joey Gathright, Adam Greenberg, and Mariano Duncan.

The Bluefish won their first league championship in 1999, led by their inaugural manager, and long time major leaguer – Willie Upshaw. The Bluefish have won the most games in Atlantic League history. The land under The Ballpark at Harbor Yard was purchased by the city of Bridgeport from Donald Trump for $1 and with the forgiveness of back taxes owed on the property. The Jenkins Valve plant was demolished to make way for the stadium. The success of the Bluefish led to redevelopment of the South End, including construction of the Arena at Harbor Yard and a multiuse parking garage.

The founders of the Bluefish were Mickey Herbert, Jack McGregor, Mary–Jane Foster, and the Bridgeport Waterfront Investors. Herbert anchored the team through a mayoral scandal and difficult financial circumstances. Prior to the 2006 season, the franchise was purchased by Get Hooked, LLC, a group of investors from Fairfield County that included McGregor and Foster. However, Get Hooked dropped the Bluefish prior to the 2008 season in favor of seeking a new ballpark for the city of Yonkers, New York. The Bluefish were purchased by Frank Boulton, who is also the owner of the Long Island Ducks and the founder of the Atlantic League.

The Bluefish became the first team in Atlantic League history to record 1,000 victories as a franchise in 2012. On June 27, 2012, the team defeated the York Revolution 2–1 at the Ballpark at Harbor Yard to capture the victory.

For one day in May 2016, Jennie Finch was a guest manager for the Bluefish, thus becoming the first woman to manage a professional baseball team. The team played and won one game that day.

In April 2017, the City of High Point, North Carolina, approved $15 million from the city budget to begin land acquisition and engineering studies for a new $45 million, publicly funded stadium to be financed through limited-obligation tax bonds. The stadium was expected to be the new home for the Bluefish in 2019. It had yet to be determined where (or if) the Bluefish would play in 2018.

On August 8, 2017, the Bluefish announced that the 2017 season would be the team's last in Bridgeport. On September 17, the Bluefish played the final game in their 20-year history at the Ballpark at Harbor Yard, losing 9–2 to the Somerset Patriots. Despite having the best overall record in the Liberty Division, the Bluefish missed the playoffs, as they finished one game back of the Patriots in the first–half standings and two games back of their cross-sound rival Long Island Ducks in the second half.

Though it had been planned for the Bluefish to relocate to High Point, later the team ceased operations at the end of the 2017 season. High Point got an expansion franchise that is not connected to the Bluefish (the High Point Rockers).

The Ballpark at Harbor Yard was converted to a concert venue known as Hartford HealthCare Amphitheater. A groundbreaking ceremony for the replacement amphitheater was held in July 2018. The amphitheater opened July 28, 2021.

== Logos and uniforms ==
The official colors of the Bridgeport Bluefish were navy blue, teal, and silver. The primary logo consisted of the "Bluefish" wordmark in navy blue with white and teal outline superimposed over a depiction of a cartoon bluefish holding a baseball bat.

The primary cap was navy blue with a teal brim and button, with the cap logo depicting a bluefish interwoven with a capital "B" centered on the front. The home jersey was white with traditional navy blue piping below the collar and around the sleeves. The "Bluefish" wordmark is centered across the front in navy blue with white outline and teal drop shadow. The away jersey is grey with navy blue piping, and the "Bridgeport" wordmark centered across the front in navy blue with a white and teal outline. The Bluefish also have a teal alternate jersey, with navy piping with the "fishhook" wordmark centered across the front.

== Season-by-season records ==
Bridgeport Bluefish – 1998 to 2017
Season	First Half W–L Record	First Half Winning Percentage	First Half Finish	Second Half W–L Record	Second Half Winning Percentage	Second Half Finish	Overall W–L Record	Overall Winning Percentage	Overall Finish	Playoffs
1998	31–18	.633	1st in League	32–18	.640	1st in League	63–36	.636	1st in League	1–3 Championship: Lost to Atlantic City Surf 3–1
1999	43–17	.717	1st in League	35–25	.583	2nd in League	78–42	.650	1st in League	3–1 Championship: def. Somerset Patriots 3–1
2000	35–35	.500	4th in North Division	43–26	.571	1st in North Division	78–61	.561	3rd in North Division	1–2 Division: Lost to Nashua Pride 2–1
2001	30–33	.476	3rd in North Division	36–27	.571	3rd in North Division	66–60	.524	3rd in North Division	Did not qualify for the playoffs
2002	36–27	.571	1st in North Division	35–28	.556	1st in North Division	71–55	.563	1st in North Division	2–4 Division: def. Camden Riversharks 2–1; Championship: lost to Newark Bears 3–0
2003	34–29	.540	2nd in North Division	39–24	.619	1st in North Division	73–53	.579	1st in North Division	1–2 Division: Lost to Nashua Pride 2–1
2004	38–25	.603	2nd in North Division	34–29	.540	2nd in North Division	72–54	.571	1st in North Division	Did not qualify for the playoffs Long Island won First Half; Nashua won Second Half
2005	33–37	.471	2nd in North Division	22–48	.314	4th in North Division	55–85	.393	3rd in North Division	Did not qualify for the playoffs
2006	38–25	.603	2nd in North Division	37–24	.607	1st in North Division	75–49	.605	1st in North Division	2–3 Division: def. Long Island Ducks 2–0; Championship: lost to Lancaster Barnstormers 3–0
2007	35–28	.556	2nd in North Division	25–38	.397	4th in North Division	60–66	.476	3rd in North Division	Did not qualify for the playoffs
2008	33–37	.471	3rd in Liberty Division	34–36	.486	3rd in Liberty Division	67–73	.479	3rd in Liberty Division	Did not qualify for the playoffs
2009	33–37	.471	3rd in Liberty Division	32–38	.457	3rd in Liberty Division	65–75	.464	3rd in Liberty Division	Did not qualify for the playoffs
2010	36–34	.514	3rd in Liberty Division	47–23	.671	1st in Liberty Division	83–57	.592	1st in Liberty Division	3–4 Division: def. Southern Maryland Blue Crabs 3–1; Championship: lost to York Revolution 3–0
2011	32–31	.507	3rd in Liberty Division	36–28	.671	2nd in Liberty Division	68–59	.535	2nd in Liberty Division	0–1 Lost play in game to Southern Maryland Blue Crabs
2012	31–39	.443	3rd in Liberty Division	36–33	.522	2nd in Liberty Division	67–72	.482	2nd in Liberty Division	Did not qualify for the playoffs
2013	23–47	.329	4th in Liberty Division	31–38	.449	2nd in Liberty Division	54–85	.388	3rd in Liberty Division	Did not qualify for the playoffs
2014	22–48	.314	4th in Liberty Division	25–45	.357	4th in Liberty Division	47–93	.336	4th in Liberty Division	Did not qualify for the playoffs
2015	26–44	.371	4th in Liberty Division	30–39	.435	3rd in Liberty Division	56–83	.403	3rd in Liberty Division	Did not qualify for the playoffs
2016	30–40	.429	4th in Liberty Division	36–34	.514	2nd in Liberty Division	66–74	.471	4th in Liberty Division	Did not qualify for the playoffs
2017	41–29	.586	2nd in Liberty Division	35–35	.500	2nd in Liberty Division	76–64	.543	1st in Liberty Division	Did not qualify for the playoffs Somerset won First Half; Long Island won Second Half
Totals (1998–2017)	660–660	.500	–	680–636	.517	–	1340–1296	.508	–	13–20 (.393)

- 1 Atlantic League Championship (1999)
- 5 Division Championships (1998, 1999, 2002, 2006, 2010)

== Ferry Cup ==
The Bridgeport Bluefish contend with the Long Island Ducks over the Ferry Cup, which is sponsored by the Bridgeport & Port Jefferson Steamboat Company. The two teams border on Long Island Sound, and many fans of both teams regularly cross it to support them. The Ducks currently hold the Ferry Cup by winning the 2011 season series 12–6. As of 2011 the Bluefish-Ducks rivalry record is 114–112, in favor of Bridgeport.

== Mascots ==
One of the Bridgeport Bluefish official mascots is an anthropomorphic bluefish named B.B. He wears the team's alternate jersey (number 98) with black sneakers. Bridgeport Bluefish was born on May 29, 1997, in Cape Hatteras. He later migrated to the Long Island Sound and joined the Bluefish soon after. The mascot's name alludes to the initials of the team and its nickname.

Captain Long Island Sounder is another source of entertainment at the Harbor Yard. He wears a uniform of a sailor. Long Island Sounder's name referred to the nautical rank of captain and a name for a Long Island Sound resident. Sounder occasionally appears at Bluefish home games.

== Retired numbers ==
42 (Jackie Robinson)
2B, Retired throughout professional baseball on April 15, 1997

21 (Roberto Clemente)
RF, Retired by the Bluefish in 2006

19 (Luis Lopez)
3B, Retired by the Bluefish on September 19, 2015,

== Guest managers ==
On several occasions, the Bluefish had promotional nights in which former baseball players and managers, as well as other celebrities, have been enlisted to serve as guest managers.

Manager	Date	Opponent	Result
Pete Rose	June 16, 2014	Lancaster Barnstormers	W 2–0
Paul O'Neill	July 24, 2015	Long Island Ducks	W 4–3
Jennie Finch	May 29, 2016	Southern Maryland Blue Crabs	W 3–1
Roger Clemens	August 5, 2016	Long Island Ducks	L 6–2
Ozzie Guillén	August 19, 2016	Somerset Patriots	L 9–3
New World Order (Kevin Nash, Scott Hall, Sean Waltman)	September 2, 2016	Southern Maryland Blue Crabs	W 8–6

== See also ==
- Professional baseball in Connecticut

Achievements
Preceded by Atlantic City Surf; 1998	Atlantic League Champions; Bridgeport Bluefish; 1999	Succeeded by Nashua Pride; 2000

Achievements
Preceded by Southern Maryland Blue Crabs; 2009	Liberty Division Champions; Bridgeport Bluefish; 2010	Succeeded by Long Island Ducks; 2011
Preceded by Nashua Pride; 2005	North Division Champions; Bridgeport Bluefish; 2006	Succeeded by Newark Bears; 2007
Preceded by Newark Bears; 2001	North Division Champions; Bridgeport Bluefish; 2002	Succeeded by Nashua Pride; 2003
Preceded by New League	Atlantic League; Best Regular Season Record; Bridgeport Bluefish; 1998, 1999	Succeeded by Nashua Pride; North Division 2000; Somerset Patriots; South Division 2000
