= Andy Larkin (baseball) =

American baseball player (born 1973)

- Pitcher
- Born: June 27, 1973 (age 52); Chelan, Washington, U.S.
- Batted: Right Threw: Right

MLB debut
- September 29, 1996, for the Florida Marlins

Last MLB appearance
- September 10, 2000, for the Kansas City Royals

MLB statistics
- Win–loss record: 3–11
- Earned run average: 8.86
- Strikeouts: 69
- Stats at Baseball Reference

Teams
- Florida Marlins (1996, 1998); Cincinnati Reds (2000); Kansas City Royals (2000)

Andrew Dane Larkin (born June 27, 1974) is an American former Major League Baseball pitcher who played for the Florida Marlins, Cincinnati Reds, and the Kansas City Royals. He was drafted by the Florida Marlins in the 25th round of the 1992 amateur draft. He made his debut on September 29, 1996, against the Houston Astros and gave up three hits and one earned run in 5 innings. He picked up his one and only MLB save on August 9, 2000, by retiring the last batter of the game to preserve a 5–2 Royals victory over the Blue Jays.

He is currently a firefighter in Gilbert, Arizona.
