= Brian Meadows =

American baseball player (born 1975)

- Pitcher
- Born: November 21, 1975 (age 50); Montgomery, Alabama, U.S.
- Batted: Right Threw: Right

MLB debut
- April 4, 1998, for the Florida Marlins

Last MLB appearance
- September 30, 2006, for the Tampa Bay Devil Rays

MLB statistics
- Win–loss record: 47–62
- Earned run average: 5.05
- Strikeouts: 454
- Stats at Baseball Reference

Former teams
- Florida Marlins (1998–1999); San Diego Padres (2000); Kansas City Royals (2000–2001); Pittsburgh Pirates (2002–2005); Tampa Bay Devil Rays (2006)

Matthew Brian Meadows (born November 21, 1975) is an American former Major League Baseball relief pitcher.

Meadows pitched with the Florida Marlins for two years. He won 11 games in back to back seasons (1998, 1999) despite having an ERA over 5.00 in those seasons.

In 2000, he was traded to the San Diego Padres, he made 22 starts for the Padres before being traded to the Kansas City Royals. He finished the season with a record of 13-10 and an ERA of 5.13 in 33 games.

In 2001, he had a 1-6 record with an ERA of 6.97 in 10 games for the Royals. He was released following the 2001 season.

In 2002, Meadows signed with the Pittsburgh Pirates. From 2003-2005, Meadows pitched exclusively out of the bullpen for the Pirates, appearing in a total of 167 games over that span.

In 2006, Meadows signed with the Tampa Bay Devil Rays. He had a 5.17 ERA in 53 games for the Devil Rays.

He retired following the 2006 season from baseball.

Meadows graduated from Charles Henderson High School in Troy, Alabama, where he played baseball. In the offseason, he designates time and effort in support of the Garth Brooks' Teammates for Kids Foundation. Meadows is also involved in the March of Dimes program in Alabama. He was originally signed by Florida scout Bill Singer.

Meadows was invited to spring training 2007 with the Cincinnati Reds, but he did not make the team.
