= 2000 Chicago White Sox season =

2000 Chicago White Sox
- American League Central champions
- League: American League
- Division: Central
- Ballpark: Comiskey Park
- City: Chicago
- Record: 95–67 (.586)
- Divisional place: 1st
- Owners: Jerry Reinsdorf
- General managers: Ron Schueler
- Managers: Jerry Manuel
- Television: WGN-TV/WCIU-TV; FSN Chicago (Ken Harrelson, Darrin Jackson)
- Radio: WMVP (John Rooney, Ed Farmer); WIND (AM) (Hector Molina)

The 2000 Chicago White Sox season was the White Sox's 101st season. They finished the regular season with a 95 wins and 67 losses record, good enough for first place in the American League Central, 5 games ahead of the 2nd place Cleveland Indians. In addition to reaching the postseason for the first time since 1993, the White Sox had the best record in the American League for the sixth time in franchise history and the first since 1983. They lost in the 2000 American League Division Series to the Seattle Mariners in a three-game sweep.

== Regular season ==
=== 2000 Opening Day lineup ===
- Ray Durham, 2B
- José Valentín, SS
- Frank Thomas, 1B
- Magglio Ordóñez, RF
- Paul Konerko, DH
- Chris Singleton, CF
- Carlos Lee, LF
- Craig Wilson, 3B
- Mark Johnson, C
- Mike Sirotka, P

=== April 22 ===
The White Sox were involved in a pair of bench-clearing brawls in a 14–6 win over the Detroit Tigers at Comiskey Park on April 22. Both were fueled by pitchers hitting batters. The tensions began in the sixth inning with Carlos Lee and Jeff Weaver who continued to jaw with Lee after being subbed out. A retaliatory pitch thrown by Jim Parque to Dean Palmer one inning later in the seventh began the first brawl which moved into shallow right field and included Keith Foulke being punched by Bobby Higginson and sustaining a cut under his left eye that needed five stitches to close. Four batters after Tanyon Sturtze hit Deivi Cruz in the ninth, the second brawl erupted when Bob Howry did likewise to Shane Halter. Among the eleven ejections were the White Sox's Sturtze, Howry, Magglio Ordóñez, Bill Simas, manager Jerry Manuel and bench coach Joe Nossek and the Tigers' Weaver, Palmer, Robert Fick, Danny Patterson and Doug Brocail.

In the harshest penalty for a brawl in MLB history, a combined 16 members of the White Sox and Tigers were suspended for a total of 82 games five days later on April 27. Tigers coach Juan Samuel incurred the longest at 15 for throwing punches rather than serving as a peacemaker, while the opposing managers Manuel and Phil Garner each received eight. Palmer was also assessed eight for participating in the second brawl despite having already been ejected. Other suspended Tigers were Higginson and Fick for five each, Brocail for four and Juan Encarnación, Karim García and Luis Polonia for three. Ordóñez was the White Sox player receiving the longest suspension at five, while Lee, Parque, Foulke, Sturtze and Howry got three each.

=== Season standings ===
AL Central
Team	W	L	Pct.	GB	Home	Road
Chicago White Sox	95	67	.586	—	46‍–‍35	49‍–‍32
Cleveland Indians	90	72	.556	5	48‍–‍33	42‍–‍39
Detroit Tigers	79	83	.488	16	43‍–‍38	36‍–‍45
Kansas City Royals	77	85	.475	18	42‍–‍39	35‍–‍46
Minnesota Twins	69	93	.426	26	36‍–‍45	33‍–‍48

=== Record vs. opponents ===
2000 American League record Source: MLB Standings Grid – 2000
Team	ANA	BAL	BOS	CWS	CLE	DET	KC	MIN	NYY	OAK	SEA	TB	TEX	TOR	NL
Anaheim	—	7–5	5–4	4–6	3–6	5–5	6–6	7–3	5–5	5–8	5–8	6–6	7–5	5–7	12–6
Baltimore	5–7	—	5–7	4–6	5–4	6–4	3–7	6–3	5–7	4–8	3–7	8–5	6–6	7–6	7–11
Boston	4–5	7–5	—	7–5	6–6	7–5	4–6	8–2	6–7	5–5	5–5	6–6	7–3	4–8	9–9
Chicago	6–4	6–4	5–7	—	8–5	9–3	5–7	7–5	8–4	6–3	7–5	6–4	5–5	5–5	12–6
Cleveland	6–3	4–5	6–6	5–8	—	6–7	5–7	5–8	5–5	6–6	7–2	8–2	6–4	8–4	13–5
Detroit	5–5	4–6	5–7	3–9	7–6	—	5–7	7–6	8–4	6–4	7–2	4–5	5–5	3–9	10–8
Kansas City	6–6	7–3	6–4	7–5	7–5	7–5	—	7–5	2–8	4–8	4–8	5–5	3–7	4–6	8–10
Minnesota	3–7	3–6	2–8	5–7	8–5	6–7	5–7	—	5–5	5–7	3–9	4–6	8–4	5–4	7–11
New York	5–5	7–5	7–6	4–8	5–5	4–8	8–2	5–5	—	6–3	4–6	6–6	10–2	5–7	11–6
Oakland	8–5	8–4	5–5	3–6	6–6	4–6	8–4	7–5	3–6	—	9–4	7–2	5–7	7–3	11–7
Seattle	8–5	7–3	5–5	5–7	2–7	2–7	8–4	9–3	6–4	4–9	—	9–3	7–5	8–2	11–7
Tampa Bay	6–6	5–8	6–6	4–6	2–8	5–4	5–5	6–4	6–6	2–7	3–9	—	5–7	5–7	9–9
Texas	5–7	6–6	3–7	5–5	4–6	5–5	7–3	4–8	2–10	7–5	5–7	7–5	—	4–6	7–11
Toronto	7–5	6–7	8–4	5–5	4–8	9–3	6–4	4–5	7–5	3–7	2–8	7–5	6–4	—	9–9

=== Notable transactions ===
- July 29, 2000: Charles Johnson was traded by the Baltimore Orioles with Harold Baines to the Chicago White Sox for Brook Fordyce, Jason Lakman (minors), Juan Figueroa (minors), and Miguel Felix (minors).

=== Roster ===
2000 Chicago White Sox
Roster
Pitchers: 37 James Baldwin; 49 Lorenzo Barceló; 57 Kevin Beirne; 60 Rocky Biddle; 44 Chad Bradford; 56 Mark Buehrle; 21 Cal Eldred; 36 Scott Eyre; 29 Keith Foulke; 52 Jon Garland; 58 Matt Ginter; 44 Ken Hill; 46 Bob Howry; 50 Sean Lowe; 62,38 Aaron Myette; 40 Jim Parque; 61 Jesús Peña; 41 Bill Simas; 33 Mike Sirotka; 47 Tanyon Sturtze; 32 Kip Wells; 65 Kelly Wunsch	Catchers: 8 Brook Fordyce; 8 Charles Johnson; 10 Mark Johnson; 15 Josh Paul; Infielders: 21 Joe Crede; 5 Ray Durham; 47 Tony Graffanino; 14 Paul Konerko; 31 Greg Norton; 43 Herbert Perry; 35 Frank Thomas; 2 José Valentín; 28 Craig Wilson	Outfielders: 25 Jeff Abbott; 26 McKay Christensen; 45 Carlos Lee; 39 Jeff Liefer; 30 Magglio Ordóñez; 12 Chris Singleton; Other batters: 3 Harold Baines	Manager: 7 Jerry Manuel; Coaches: 54 Nardi Contreras; 18 Wallace Johnson; 48 Von Joshua; 53 Art Kusnyer; 20 Bryan Little; 21 Joe Nossek

== Game log ==
=== Regular season ===
Legend
	White Sox win
	White Sox loss
	Postponement
	Clinched division
**Bold**	White Sox team member

2000 regular season game log: 95–67 (Home: 46–35; Away: 49–32)
April: 17–8 (Home: 9–3; Away: 9–5)

#	Date	Time (CT)	Opponent	Score	Win	Loss	Save	Time of Game	Attendance	Record	Streak
1	April 3	2:05 p.m. CDT	@ Rangers	L 4–10	Rogers (1–0)	**Sirotka** (0–1)	—	2:39	49,332	0–1	L1
2	April 4	7:05 p.m. CDT	@ Rangers	L 8–12	Cordero (1–0)	**Simas** (0–1)	—	3:47	29,418	0–2	L2
3	April 5	2:05 p.m. CDT	@ Rangers	**W** 12–8	**Foulke** (1–0)	Zimmerman (0–1)	—	3:30	25,544	1–2	W1
4	April 6	7:05 p.m. CDT	@ Rangers	**W** 6–2	**Baldwin** (1–0)	Loaiza (0–1)	—	2:23	28,466	2–2	W2
5	April 7	9:05 p.m. CDT	@ Athletics	**W** 7–6	**Eyre** (1–0)	Magnante (0–1)	**Foulke** (1)	3:36	10,549	3–2	W3
6	April 8	3:05 p.m. CDT	@ Athletics	**W** 7–3	**Sirotka** (1–1)	Mahay (0–1)	—	2:59	13,125	4–2	W4
7	April 9	3:05 p.m. CDT	@ Athletics	L 2–14	Appier (1–1)	**K. Wells** (0–1)	—	3:00	13,280	4–3	L1
8	April 11	6:15 p.m. CDT	@ Devil Rays	**W** 13–6	**Parque** (1–0)	Yan (0–1)	—	2:58	13,639	5–3	W1
9	April 12	6:15 p.m. CDT	@ Devil Rays	**W** 7–1	**Baldwin** (2–0)	Wheeler (0–1)	—	2:56	14,034	6–3	W2
10	April 13	11:15 a.m. CDT	@ Devil Rays	L 5–6 (12)	Mecir (2–0)	**Sturtze** (0–1)	—	4:04	15,464	6–4	L1
11	April 14		Angels	9–4	**Sirotka** (2–1)	Hill (1–2)		3:25	38,912	7–4	box
12	April 15		Angels	1–3	Bottenfield (1–1)	**K. Wells** (0–2)	Percival (3)	2:51	14,135	7–5	box
13	April 16		Angels	1–3	Schoeneweis (3–0)	**Parque** (1–1)	Percival (4)	2:35	10,929	7–6	box
—	April 17	7:05 p.m. CDT	Mariners	**Postponed (Rain)** (Makeup date: August 8)							
14	April 18	7:05 p.m. CDT	Mariners	**W** 18–11	**Sturtze** (1–1)	Sele (1–1)	—	3:32	9,898	8–6	W1
15	April 19	1:05 p.m. CDT	Mariners	**W** 5–2	**Lowe** (1–0)	Meche (0–1)	**Howry** (1)	2:57	8,425	9–6	W2
16	April 21		Tigers	7–2	**K. Wells** (1–2)	Nitkowski (1–3)		2:52	11,278	10–6	box
17	April 22		Tigers	14–6	**Parque** (2–1)	Weaver (0–2)		3:19	16,410	11–6	box
18	April 23		Tigers	9–4	**Baldwin** (3–0)	Borkowski (0–1)		2:47	12,154	12–6	box
19	April 24	7:05 p.m. CDT	Orioles	**W** 8–2	**Eldred** (1–0)	Mussina (0–2)	—	2:14	15,461	13–6	W5
20	April 25	7:05 p.m. CDT	Orioles	L 6–12	Rapp (3–0)	**Sirotka** (2–2)	—	3:15	11,658	13–7	L1
21	April 26	7:05 p.m. CDT	Orioles	**W** 11–6	**K. Wells** (2–2)	Ponson (2–1)	—	2:59	13,649	14–7	W1
22	April 27	1:05 p.m. CDT	Orioles	**W** 13–4	**Parque** (3–1)	Mercedes (2–1)	—	2:49	13,225	15–7	W2
23	April 28		@ Tigers	3–2	**Baldwin** (4–0)	Weaver (0–3)	**Foulke** (2)	2:24	26,916	16–7	box
24	April 29		@ Tigers	2–1	**Eldred** (2–0)	Mlicki (0–5)	**Foulke** (3)	2:37	28,393	17–7	box
25	April 30		@ Tigers	3 – 4 (12)	Anderson (1–0)	**Eyre** (1–1)		3:36	28,393	17–8	box

May: 13–14 (Home: 6–6; Away: 7–8)

#	Date	Time (CT)	Opponent	Score	Win	Loss	Save	Time of Game	Attendance	Record	Streak
26	May 1		Blue Jays	3–5	Carpenter (3–3)	**K. Wells** (2–3)	Koch (6)	2:58	14,448	17–9	box
27	May 2		Blue Jays	1–4	Castillo (1–2)	**Wunsch** (0–1)	Koch (7)	3:06	10,397	17–10	box
28	May 3		Blue Jays	7–3	**Baldwin** (5–0)	Escobar (2–4)	**Foulke** (4)	2:39	12,026	18–10	box
29	May 5		@ Royals	1–5	Fussell (2–1)	**Eldred** (2–1)		2:38	19,622	18–11	box
30	May 6		@ Royals	5–11	Spradlin (1–1)	**Sirotka** (2–3)		2:53	28,300	18–12	box
31	May 7		@ Royals	8–12	Bottalico (4–1)	**Wunsch** (0–2)		3:25	23,107	18–13	box
32	May 8	6:05 p.m. CDT	@ Red Sox	L 2–3	Rose (2–2)	**Sirotka** (1–2)	Lowe (8)	2:31	23,468	18–14	L4
33	May 9	6:05 p.m. CDT	@ Red Sox	**W** 6–0	**Baldwin** (6–0)	Schourek (1–3)	—	2:22	25,371	19–14	W1
34	May 10	6:05 p.m. CDT	@ Red Sox	L 3–5 (7)	Martinez (3–2)	**Eldred** (2–2)	Garcés (1)	2:16	28,911	19–15	L1
35	May 12	7:05 p.m. CDT	Twins	L 3–4 (10)	Miller (1–2)	**Lowe** (1–1)	Carrasco (1)	3:22	12,526	19–16	L2
36	May 13	6:05 p.m. CDT	Twins	**W** 4–3	**Wunsch** (1–2)	Wells (0–4)	—	2:52	22,545	20–16	W1
37	May 14	1:05 p.m. CDT	Twins	**W** 5–3	**Wunsch** (2–2)	Radke (2–4)	**Foulke** (5)	2:50	29,177	21–16	W2
38	May 16	6:05 p.m. CDT	@ Yankees	**W** 4–0	**Eldred** (3–2)	Hernández (4–3)	—	3:10	31,143	22–16	W3
39	May 17	6:05 p.m. CDT	@ Yankees	L 4–9	Clemens (4–3)	**Parque** (3–2)	—	3:09	26,887	22–17	L1
40	May 19		@ Blue Jays	5–3	**Sirotka** (3–3)	Escobar (4–5)	**Foulke** (6)	2:49	18,268	23–17	box
41	May 20		@ Blue Jays	6–2	**Baldwin** (7–0)	D. Wells (7–2)		2:22	20,091	24–17	box
42	May 21		@ Blue Jays	2–1	**Eldred** (4–2)	Castillo (1–4)	**Foulke** (7)	2:39	18,264	25–17	box
43	May 22		@ Blue Jays	3–4	Koch (3–0)	**Howry** (0–1)		2:32	19,167	25–18	box
44	May 23	7:05 p.m. CDT	Yankees	**W** 8–2	**K. Wells** (3–3)	Clemens (4–4)	—	2:53	21,863	26–18	W1
45	May 24	7:05 p.m. CDT	Yankees	L 4–12	Pettitte (3–2)	**Sirotka** (3–4)	—	3:17	23,144	26–19	L1
46	May 25	7:15 p.m. CDT	Yankees	L 0–7	Mendoza (5–2)	**Baldwin** (7–1)	—	2:21	23,636	26–20	L2
47	May 26	7:05 p.m. CDT	Indians	**W** 5–3	**Eldred** (5–2)	Finley (3–4)	**Foulke** (8)	2:39	18,225	27–20	W1
48	May 27	6:05 p.m. CDT	Indians	**W** 14–3	**Parque** (4–2)	Wright (3–3)	—	3:10	30,250	28–20	W2
49	May 28	1:05 p.m. CDT	Indians	L 3–12	Colón (5–2)	**K. Wells** (3–4)	—	4:01	24,192	28–21	L1
50	May 29	7:05 p.m. CDT	@ Mariners	L 4–5	Halama (6–0)	**Sirotka** (3–5)	Sasaki (7)	3:05	34,429	28–22	L2
51	May 30	9:05 p.m. CDT	@ Mariners	**W** 2–1	**Baldwin** (8–1)	Abbott (1–2)	**Foulke** (9)	2:26	25,788	29–22	W1
52	May 31	5:35 p.m. CDT	@ Mariners	**W** 4–3	**Howry** (1–1)	Sasaki (1–4)	**Foulke** (10)	3:11	35,823	30–22	W2

June: 20–7 (Home: 8–6; Away: 12–1)

#	Date	Time (CT)	Opponent	Score	Win	Loss	Save	Time of Game	Attendance	Record	Streak
53	June 2		@ Astros	7–4	**Parque** (5–2)	Reynolds (5–2)	**Foulke** (11)	2:56	39,028	31–22	box
54	June 3		@ Astros	1–6	Holt (3–6)	**K. Wells** (3–5)		3:00	39,459	31–23	box
55	June 4		@ Astros	7–3	**Sirotka** (4–5)	Dotel (1–4)		2:45	41,117	32–23	box
56	June 5		@ Reds	4–3	**Baldwin** (9–1)	Parris (2–8)	**Foulke** (12)	2:41	26,624	33–23	box
57	June 6		@ Reds	17–12	**Eldred** (6–2)	Villone (6–3)		3:44	28,908	34–23	box
58	June 7		@ Reds	6–4	**Parque** (6–2)	Bell (4–4)	**Foulke** (13)	3:21	31,023	35–23	box
59	June 9	7:05 p.m. CDT	Cubs	**W** 6–5 (14)	**Peña** (1–0)	Van Poppel (0–2)	—	4:42	44,140	36–23	W5
60	June 10	1:05 p.m. CDT	Cubs	**W** 4–3	**Sirotka** (5–5)	Wood (2–4)	**Foulke** (14)	3:05	43,806	37–23	W6
61	June 11	1:05 p.m. CDT	Cubs	L 5–6	Van Poppel (1–2)	**Peña** (1–1)	Aguilera (12)	2:59	43,158	37–24	L1
62	June 12	6:05 p.m. CDT	@ Indians	**W** 8–7	**Eldred** (7–2)	Rigdon (1–1)	**Foulke** (15)	3:37	43,229	38–24	W1
63	June 13	6:05 p.m. CDT	@ Indians	**W** 4–3 (10)	**Simas** (1–1)	Speier (0–1)	**Howry** (2)	3:26	43,233	39–24	W2
64	June 14	6:05 p.m. CDT	@ Indians	**W** 11–4	**Beirne** (1–0)	Brower (1–1)	—	3:39	43,284	40–24	W3
65	June 15	6:05 p.m. CDT	@ Yankees	**W** 12–3	**Sirotka** (6–5)	Pettitte (6–3)	—	3:38	30,803	41–24	W4
66	June 16	6:05 p.m. CDT	@ Yankees	**W** 3–1	**Baldwin** (10–1)	Stanton (1–1)	**Howry** (3)	2:54	41,910	42–24	W5
67	June 17	3:35 p.m. CDT	@ Yankees	**W** 10–9	**Eldred** (8–2)	Westbrook (0–1)	**Foulke** (16)	3:43	54,053	43–24	W6
68	June 18	12:05 p.m. CDT	@ Yankees	**W** 17–4	**Parque** (7–2)	Hernández (6–6)	—	3:26	52,856	44–24	W7
69	June 19	7:05 p.m. CDT	Indians	**W** 6–1	**K. Wells** (4–5)	Colón (6–4)	—	3:04	43,062	45–24	W8
70	June 20	7:05 p.m. CDT	Indians	L 1–4	Brower (2–1)	**Sirotka** (6–6)	Karsay (15)	2:34	20,005	45–25	L1
71	June 21	7:05 p.m. CDT	Indians	L 6–8	Burba (8–2)	**Baldwin** (10–2)	Karsay (16)	3:00	23,516	45–26	L2
72	June 22	7:05 p.m. CDT	Indians	**W** 6–0	**Eldred** (9–2)	Finley (5–5)	—	2:52	23,374	46–26	W1
73	June 23	7:05 p.m. CDT	Yankees	**W** 4–3	**Lowe** (2–1)	Rivera (2–2)	—	3:10	38,773	47–26	W2
74	June 24	6:05 p.m. CDT	Yankees	L 8–12	Mendoza (7–3)	**K. Wells** (4–6)	Rivera (17)	3:56	32,623	47–27	L1
75	June 25	1:05 p.m. CDT	Yankees	**W** 8–7	**Sirotka** (7–6)	Pettitte (7–4)	**Howry** (4)	3:15	40,817	48–27	W1
76	June 27	7:05 p.m. CDT	Twins	L 4–7	Mays (4–9)	**Baldwin** (10–3)	Wells (5)	3:07	20,283	48–28	L1
77	June 28	7:05 p.m. CDT	Twins	**W** 7–3	**Eldred** (10–2)	Lincoln (0–1)	—	2:52	17,541	49–28	W1
78	June 29	1:05 p.m. CDT	Twins	L 1–10	Milton (8–2)	**K. Wells** (4–7)	—	3:04	21,239	49–29	L1
79	June 30	7:05 p.m. CDT	Red Sox	**W** 10–4	**Parque** (8–2)	Pichardo (2–1)	—	3:05	32,157	50–29	W1

July: 14–12 (Home: 7–4; Away: 7–8)

#	Date	Time (CT)	Opponent	Score	Win	Loss	Save	Time of Game	Attendance	Record	Streak
80	July 1	12 Noon CDT	Red Sox	**W** 7–2	**Sirotka** (8–6)	Crawford (0–1)	—	2:44	28,006	51–29	W2
81	July 2	1:05 p.m. CDT	Red Sox	**W** 8–2	**Baldwin** (11–3)	Schourek (2–7)	—	2:44	32,934	52–29	W3
82	July 3		@ Royals	14–10	**Peña** (2–1)	Santiago (6–3)		3:55	24,496	53–29	box
83	July 4		@ Royals	7–10	Spradlin (3–2)	**Garland** (0–1)		3:06	29,884	53–30	box
84	July 5		@ Royals	6 – 3 (13)	**Wunsch** (3–2)	Bochtler (0–1)		4:22	15,009	54–30	box
85	July 7	2:20 p.m. CDT	@ Cubs	**W** 4–2 (12)	**Lowe** (3–1)	Van Poppel (2–3)	**Peña** (1)	3:23	39,112	55–30	W2
86	July 8	11:15 a.m. CDT	@ Cubs	L 2–9	Lieber (8–5)	**Baldwin** (11–4)	—	2:40	38,933	55–31	L1
87	July 9	1:20 p.m. CDT	@ Cubs	L 6–9	Tapani (5–7)	**Simas** (1–2)	Worrell (1)	2:46	38,706	55–32	L2
—	July 11	7:35 p.m. CDT	**71st All-Star Game in Atlanta, GA**								
88	July 13	7:05 p.m. CDT	Cardinals	L 5–13	Benes (10–3)	**Sirotka** (8–7)	—	3:17	32,263	55–33	L3
89	July 14	7:05 p.m. CDT	Cardinals	L 4–9	Stephenson (10–5)	**Wunsch** (3–3)	—	3:25	34,862	55–34	L4
90	July 15	6:05 p.m. CDT	Cardinals	**W** 15–7	**Parque** (9–2)	Kile (11–6)	—	4:00	40,681	56–34	W1
91	July 16	1:05 p.m. CDT	Brewers	**W** 11–5	**Baldwin** (13–4)	Snyder (3–4)	—	2:47	30,050	57–34	W2
92	July 17	7:05 p.m. CDT	Brewers	**W** 11–2	**Garland** (1–1)	Bere (6–7)	—	2:53	31,369	58–34	W3
93	July 18	7:05 p.m. CDT	Brewers	**W** 7–5	**Sirotka** (9–7)	Wright (5–3)	**Wunsch** (1)	3:00	18,542	59–34	W4
94	July 19	7:05 p.m. CDT	@ Twins	**W** 3–2	**Buehrle** (1–0)	Milton (8–6)	**Foulke** (17)	2:46	12,494	60–34	W5
95	July 20	12:05 p.m. CDT	@ Twins	L 1–5	Mays (5–11)	**Parque** (9–3)	—	2:35	18,676	60–35	L1
96	July 21	6:05 p.m. CDT	@ Red Sox	**W** 8–5	**Simas** (2–2)	Pichardo (4–2)	**Howry** (5)	3:16	33,869	61–35	W1
97	July 22	4:05 p.m. CDT	@ Red Sox	L 6–8	Fassero (7–3)	**Garland** (1–2)	—	2:59	33,384	61–36	L1
98	July 23	12:05 p.m. CDT	@ Red Sox	L 0–1	Martínez (11–3)	**Sirotka** (9–8)	—	2:28	33,224	61–37	L2
99	July 24		Royals	7–6	**Wunsch** (4–3)	Suzuki (5–5)	**Foulke** (18)	3:08	34,473	62–37	box
100	July 25		Royals	1–6	Suppan (5–6)	**Parque** (9–4)		2:42	21,091	62–38	box
101	July 26		Royals	6–7	Spradlin (4–2)	**Howry** (1–2)	Bottalico (8)	3:10	26,615	62–39	box
102	July 27		@ Angels	6–5	**Garland** (2–2)	Cooper (4–5)	**Foulke** (19)	3:24	24,394	63–39	box
103	July 28		@ Angels	7–10	Holtz (1–2)	**Beirne** (1–1)	Percival (24)	3:13	40,711	63–40	box
104	July 29		@ Angels	5–6	Bottenfield (7–8)	**Barceló** (0–1)	Percival (25)	3:09	25,881	63–41	box
105	July 30		@ Angels	11 – 7 (10)	**Foulke** (2–0)	Levine (2–4)		4:09	27,538	64–41	box

August: 15–13 (Home: 6–7; Away: 9–6)

#	Date	Time (CT)	Opponent	Score	Win	Loss	Save	Time of Game	Attendance	Record	Streak
106	August 1	7:35 p.m. CDT	@ Rangers	**W** 4–3	**Howry** (2–2)	Wetteland (4–4)	—	2:42	37,784	65–41	W2
107	August 2	7:35 p.m. CDT	@ Rangers	L 2–7	Helling (13–7)	**Garland** (2–3)	Crabtree (1)	2:57	36,786	65–42	L1
108	August 4	7:05 p.m. CDT	Athletics	L 3–5	Appier (10–8)	**Sirotka** (9–9)	Isringhausen (25)	3:22	30,019	65–43	L2
109	August 5	6:05 p.m. CDT	Athletics	**W** 4–3 (10)	**Foulke** (3–0)	Mathews (2–3)	—	3:14	35,314	66–43	W1
110	August 6	1:05 p.m. CDT	Athletics	**W** 13–0	**Baldwin** (14–4)	Hudson (12–4)	—	2:50	32,952	67–43	W2
111 (1)	August 8	4:05 p.m. CDT	Mariners	L 4–12	Piñeiro (1–0)	**Garland** (2–4)	Tomko (1)	3:11	23,647	67–44	L1
112 (2)	August 8	7:45 p.m. CDT	Mariners	L 5–7	García (4–2)	**Buehrle** (1–1)	Sasaki (27)	3:43	23,647	67–45	L2
113	August 9	7:05 p.m. CDT	Mariners	**W** 19–3	**Sirotka** (10–9)	Moyer (11–5)	—	3:10	24,947	68–45	W1
114	August 10	1:05 p.m. CDT	Mariners	L 3–6	Sele (13–6)	**Biddle** (0–1)	Sasaki (28)	2:41	23,924	68–46	L1
115	August 11	7:15 p.m. CDT	@ Devil Rays	**W** 6–5	**Buehrle** (2–1)	Wilson (0–1)	**Foulke** (20)	3:13	18,370	69–46	W1
116	August 12	3:15 p.m. CDT	@ Devil Rays	**W** 5–4 (10)	**Buehrle** (3–1)	Hernández (3–4)	**Foulke** (21)	3:12	27,538	70–46	W2
117	August 13	12:15 p.m. CDT	@ Devil Rays	L 3–5	López (10–8)	**Howry** (2–3)	—	2:28	19,685	70–47	L1
118	August 14	6:35 p.m. CDT	@ Orioles	L 2–8	Mercedes (8–4)	**Sirotka** (10–10)	—	3:02	40,047	70–48	L2
119	August 15	6:35 p.m. CDT	@ Orioles	**W** 14–4	**Biddle** (1–1)	Johnson (1–9)	—	2:48	37,707	71–48	W1
120	August 16	6:35 p.m. CDT	@ Orioles	**W** 7–3	**Parque** (10–4)	Mussina (7–13)	—	2:35	39,079	72–48	W2
121	August 17	2:05 p.m. CDT	@ Orioles	L 3–5	Parrish (2–1)	**Baldwin** (14–5)	—	2:52	40,205	72–49	L1
122	August 18	7:05 p.m. CDT	Devil Rays	**W** 5–2	**Garland** (3–4)	Rekar (4–8)	**Foulke** (22)	2:36	25,160	73–49	W1
123	August 19	6:05 p.m. CDT	Devil Rays	**W** 7–0	**Sirotka** (11–10)	López (10–9)	—	2:32	38,926	74–49	W2
124	August 20	1:05 p.m. CDT	Devil Rays	L 11–12	Yan (6–8)	**Foulke** (3–1)	Hernández (23)	3:45	27,744	74–50	L1
125	August 21	7:05 p.m. CDT	Devil Rays	L 4–11	Sturtze (5–2)	**Parque** (10–5)	—	2:57	31,744	74–51	L2
126	August 23	7:05 p.m. CDT	Orioles	**W** 8–4	**Barceló** (1–1)	Parrish (2–2)	—	3:14	22,528	75–51	W1
127	August 24	1:05 p.m. CDT	Orioles	L 5–8	Mercedes (9–5)	**Hill** (5–8)	—	3:15	20,007	75–52	L1
128	August 25	9:05 p.m. CDT	@ Mariners	**W** 4–1	**Sirotka** (12–10)	Sele (13–9)	**Foulke** (23)	3:08	44,745	76–52	W1
129	August 26	8:05 p.m. CDT	@ Mariners	L 5–11	Halama (11–6)	**Biddle** (1–2)	—	3:36	45,191	76–53	L1
130	August 27	3:35 p.m. CDT	@ Mariners	**W** 2–1	**Barceló** (2–1)	García (4–4)	**Foulke** (24)	2:44	45,525	77–53	W1
131	August 28	9:05 p.m. CDT	@ Athletics	L 0–3	Hudson (14–6)	**Parque** (10–6)	—	2:19	12,436	77–54	L1
132	August 29	9:05 p.m. CDT	@ Athletics	**W** 3–0	**Baldwin** (15–5)	Zito (2–3)	**Foulke** (25)	2:20	12,129	78–54	W1
133	August 30	2:35 p.m. CDT	@ Athletics	**W** 8–3	**Sirotka** (13–10)	Appier (12–10)	**Howry** (6)	3:05	19,458	79–54	W2

September: 16–12 (Home: 10–8; Away: 6–4)

#	Date	Time (CT)	Opponent	Score	Win	Loss	Save	Time of Game	Attendance	Record	Streak
134	September 1		Angels	9–8	**Ginter** (1–0)	Hasegawa (8–3)	**Foulke** (26)	3:06	16,377	80–54	box
135	September 2		Angels	13–6	**Parque** (11–6)	Mercker (1–3)		3:09	29,785	81–54	box
136	September 3		Angels	13–12	**Wunsch** (5–3)	Hasegawa (8–4)	**Foulke** (27)	3:38	22,020	82–54	box
137	September 4	1:05 p.m. CDT	Rangers	L 4–5	Davis (6–5)	**Garland** (3–5)	Wetteland (29)	3:14	29,614	82–55	L1
138	September 5	7:05 p.m. CDT	Rangers	L 1–2	Johnson (1–0)	**Howry** (2–4)	Wetteland (30)	2:58	13,899	82–56	L2
139	September 6	7:05 p.m. CDT	Rangers	**W** 13–1	**K. Wells** (5–7)	Helling (14–11)	—	2:41	15,622	83–56	W1
140	September 7	7:05 p.m. CDT	Rangers	**W** 10–6	**Barceló** (3–1)	Zimmerman (3–5)	**Foulke** (28)	2:49	18,219	84–56	W2
141	September 8	6:05 p.m. CDT	@ Indians	**W** 5–4	**Buehrle** (4–1)	Woodard (2–10)	**Foulke** (29)	3:34	42,526	85–56	W3
142	September 9	12:05 p.m. CDT	@ Indians	L 3–9	Burba (14–6)	**Garland** (3–6)	—	3:23	42,561	85–57	L1
—	September 10		@ Indians	Postponed (rain); Makeup: September 25							
143	September 11		Tigers	10–3	**Sirotka** (14–10)	Moehler (12–8)	**Howry** (7)	3:15	21,527	86–57	box
144	September 12		Tigers	3–10	Mlicki (5–11)	**K. Wells** (5–8)		3:09	15,297	86–58	box
145	September 13		Tigers	1–0	**Parque** (12–6)	Weaver (9–14)	**Foulke** (30)	2:38	16,651	87–58	box
146	September 15		Blue Jays	5–6	Escobar (10–14)	**Garland** (3–7)	Koch (33)	3:18	23,105	87–59	box
147	September 16		Blue Jays	6–3	**Wunsch** (6–3)	Escobar (10–15)	**Foulke** (31)	2:43	33,204	88–59	box
148	September 17		Blue Jays	1–14	Painter (2–0)	**K. Wells** (5–9)		3:06	26,113	88–60	box
149	September 18		@ Tigers	2–5	Weaver (10–14)	**Barceló** (3–2)	Jones (40)	2:42	22,718	88–61	box
150	September 19		@ Tigers	6–2	**Lowe** (4–1)	Sparks (6–5)		2:32	24,951	89–61	box
151	September 20		@ Tigers	13–6	**Garland** (4–7)	Moehler (12–9)		3:00	28,422	90–61	box
152	September 21	7:05 p.m. CDT	@ Twins	**W** 9–4	**Sirotka** (15–10)	Santana (2–3)	—	3:03	6,688	91–61	W3
153	September 22	7:05 p.m. CDT	@ Twins	**W** 5–4	**Barceló** (4–2)	Wells (0–7)	**Foulke** (32)	2:57	9,060	92–61	W4
154	September 23	6:05 p.m. CDT	@ Twins	**W** 5–3	**Parque** (13–6)	Milton (13–10)	**Foulke** (33)	2:50	20,263	93–61	W5
155	September 24	1:05 p.m. CDT	@ Twins	L 5–6 (10)	Guardado (6–3)	**Beirne** (1–2)	—	3:06	9,716	93–62	L1
156	September 25	12:05 p.m. CDT	@ Indians	L 2–9	Burba (16–6)	**Garland** (4–8)	—	3:03	42,500	93–63	L2
157	September 26	7:05 p.m. CDT	Red Sox	L 3–4	Martínez (18–6)	**Beirne** (1–3)	Lowe (39)	2:31	23,319	93–64	box
158	September 27	7:05 p.m. CDT	Red Sox	L 1–2	Crawford (2–1)	**Baldwin** (15–6)	Lowe (40)	2:21	16,368	93–65	box
159	September 28	7:05 p.m. CDT	Red Sox	L 6–7	Beck (3–0)	**Simas** (2–3)	Lowe (41)	3:23	18,326	93–66	box
160	September 29		Royals	6–4	**Bradford** (1–0)	Reichert (8–10)	**Foulke** (34)	2:53	17,735	94–66	box
161	September 30		Royals	9–1	**K. Wells** (6–9)	Stein (8–5)		2:43	29,692	95–66	box

October: 0–1 (Home: 0–1; Away: 0–0)

#	Date	Time (CT)	Opponent	Score	Win	Loss	Save	Time of Game	Attendance	Record	Streak
162	October 1		Royals	2–6	Fussell (5–3)	**Baldwin** (15–7)		2:58	30,071	95–67	box

=== Detailed records ===
American League
Opponent	W	L	WP	RS	RA
AL East
Baltimore Orioles
Boston Red Sox
New York Yankees	8	4	0.667	82	69
Tampa Bay Devil Rays
Toronto Blue Jays
Div Total	8	4	0.667	82	69
AL Central
**Chicago White Sox**					
Cleveland Indians
Detroit Tigers
Kansas City Royals
Minnesota Twins
Div Total
AL West
Anaheim Angels
Oakland Athletics	6	3	0.667	47	37
Seattle Mariners	7	5	0.583	75	63
Texas Rangers
Div Total	13	8	0.619	122	100
League Total	21	13	0.618	204	169
National League
Chicago Cubs
Cincinnati Reds
Houston Astros
Milwaukee Brewers
St. Louis Cardinals	1	2	0.333	24	29
League Total	1	2	0.333	24	29
Season Total	22	15	0.595	228	198

Month	Games	Won	Lost	Win %	RS	RA
April	25	17	8	0.680	181	134
May	27	13	14	0.481	116	125
June	27	20	7	0.741	183	136
July	26	14	12	0.538	168	156
August	28	15	13	0.536	159	136
September	28	16	12	0.571	169	146
October	1	0	1	0.000	2	6
Total	162	95	67	0.586	978	839

	Games	Won	Lost	Win %	RS	RA
Home	81	46	35	0.568	524	430
Away	81	49	32	0.605	454	409
Total	162	95	67	0.586	978	839

=== Postseason Game log ===
Legend
	White Sox win
	White Sox loss
**Bold**	White Sox team member

2000 Postseason game log: 0–3 (Home: 0–2; Away: 0–1)
AL Division Series vs. Seattle Mariners 0–3 (Home: 0–2; Away: 0–1)

#	Date	Time (CT)	Opponent	Score	Win	Loss	Save	Time of Game	Attendance	Series	Box/ Streak
1	October 3	3:07 p.m. CDT	Mariners	L 4–7	Mesa (1–0)	**Foulke** (0–1)	Sasaki (1)	4:12	45,290	SEA 1–0	L1
2	October 4	12:07 p.m. CDT	Mariners	L 2–5	Abbott (1–0)	**Sirotka** (0–1)	Sasaki (2)	3:16	45,383	SEA 2–0	L2
3	October 6	3:07 p.m. CDT	@ Mariners	L 1–2	Paniagua (1–0)	**Wunsch** (0–1)	—	2:40	40,142	SEA 3–0	L3

== Player stats ==
=== Batting ===
Note: G = Games played; AB = At bats; R = Runs scored; H = Hits; 2B = Doubles; 3B = Triples; HR = Home runs; RBI = Runs batted in; BB = Base on balls; SO = Strikeouts; AVG = Batting average; SB = Stolen bases

Player	G	AB	R	H	2B	3B	HR	RBI	BB	SO	AVG	SB
Jeff Abbott, OF	80	215	31	59	15	1	3	29	21	38	.274	2
Harold Baines, DH	24	61	2	13	5	0	1	9	7	11	.213	0
James Baldwin, P	29	4	0	0	0	0	0	0	0	2	.000	0
McKay Christensen, CF	32	19	4	2	0	0	0	1	2	6	.105	1
Joe Crede, 3B	7	14	2	5	1	0	0	3	0	3	.357	0
Ray Durham, 2B	151	614	121	172	35	9	17	75	75	105	.280	25
Cal Eldred, P	20	4	3	1	0	0	0	0	2	1	.250	0
Brook Fordyce, C	40	125	18	34	7	1	5	21	6	23	.272	0
Tony Graffanino, SS, 2B, 3B	57	148	25	40	5	1	2	16	21	25	.270	7
Charles Johnson, C	44	135	24	44	8	0	10	36	20	37	.326	0
Mark Johnson, C	75	213	29	48	11	0	3	23	27	40	.225	3
Paul Konerko, 1B, 3B, DH	143	524	84	156	31	1	21	97	47	72	.298	1
Carlos Lee, LF	152	572	107	172	29	2	24	92	38	94	.301	13
Jeff Liefer, RF, 1B	5	11	0	2	0	0	0	0	0	4	.182	0
Greg Norton, 3B, 1B	71	201	25	49	6	1	6	28	26	47	.244	1
Magglio Ordóñez, RF	153	588	102	185	34	3	32	126	60	64	.315	18
Jim Parque, P	33	4	0	0	0	0	0	0	0	3	.000	0
Josh Paul, C	36	71	15	20	3	2	1	8	5	17	.282	1
Herbert Perry, 3B, 1B	109	383	69	118	29	1	12	61	22	68	.308	4
Chris Singleton, CF	147	511	83	130	22	5	11	62	35	85	.254	22
Mike Sirotka, P	32	4	0	0	0	0	0	0	1	2	.000	0
Frank Thomas, DH, 1B	159	582	115	191	44	0	43	143	112	94	.328	1
José Valentín, SS	144	568	107	155	37	6	25	92	59	106	.273	19
Kip Wells, P	20	2	0	0	0	0	0	0	0	2	.000	0
Craig Wilson, 3B, SS, 2B	28	73	12	19	3	0	0	4	5	11	.260	1
Team totals	162	5646	978	1615	325	33	216	926	591	960	.286	119

=== Pitching ===
Note: W = Wins; L = Losses; ERA = Earned run average; G = Games pitched; GS = Games started; SV = Saves; IP = Innings pitched; H = Hits allowed; R = Runs allowed; ER = Earned runs allowed; HR = Home runs allowed; BB = Walks allowed; K = Strikeouts

Player	W	L	ERA	G	GS	SV	IP	H	R	ER	HR	BB	K
James Baldwin	14	7	4.65	29	28	0	178.0	185	96	92	34	62	116
Lorenzo Barceló	4	2	3.69	22	1	0	39.0	34	17	16	5	10	26
Kevin Beirne	1	3	6.70	29	1	0	49.2	50	41	37	9	21	41
Rocky Biddle	1	2	8.34	4	4	0	22.2	31	25	21	5	8	7
Chad Bradford	1	0	1.98	12	0	0	13.2	13	4	3	0	2	9
Mark Buehrle	4	1	4.21	28	3	0	51.1	55	27	24	5	20	37
Cal Eldred	10	2	4.58	20	20	0	112.0	103	61	57	12	59	97
Scott Eyre	1	1	6.63	13	1	0	19.0	29	15	14	3	12	16
Keith Foulke	3	1	2.97	72	0	34	88.0	66	31	29	9	24	91
Jon Garland	4	8	6.46	15	13	0	69.2	82	55	50	10	40	42
Matt Ginter	1	0	13.50	7	0	0	9.1	18	14	14	5	7	6
Ken Hill	0	1	24.00	2	1	0	3.0	5	8	8	0	6	0
Bob Howry	2	4	3.17	65	0	7	71.0	54	26	25	6	31	60
Sean Lowe	4	1	5.48	50	5	0	70.2	78	47	43	10	42	53
Aaron Myette	0	0	0.00	2	0	0	2.2	0	0	0	0	4	1
Jim Parque	13	6	4.28	33	32	0	187.0	208	105	89	21	72	111
Jesús Peña	2	1	5.40	20	0	1	23.1	25	18	14	6	16	19
Bill Simas	2	3	3.46	60	0	0	67.2	69	27	26	9	28	49
Mike Sirotka	15	10	3.79	32	32	0	197.0	203	101	83	23	70	128
Tanyon Sturtze	1	2	12.06	10	1	0	15.2	25	23	21	4	15	6
Kip Wells	6	9	6.02	20	20	0	98.2	126	76	66	15	62	71
Kelly Wunsch	6	3	2.93	83	0	1	61.1	50	22	20	4	30	51
Team totals	95	67	4.66	162	162	43	1450.1	1509	839	751	195	641	1037

== ALDS ==
Seattle defeated the White Sox in a 3-game sweep.

Game	Home	Score	Visitor	Score	Date	Series
1	Chicago	4	Seattle	7	October 3	1-0 (SEA)
2	Chicago	2	Seattle	5	October 4	2-0 (SEA)
3	Seattle	2	Chicago	1	October 6	3-0 (SEA)

== Awards and honors ==
- Jerry Manuel, Associated Press Manager of the Year

== Farm system ==
Level	Team	League	Manager
AAA	Charlotte Knights	International League	Nick Leyva
AA	Birmingham Barons	Southern League	Nick Capra
A	Winston-Salem Warthogs	Carolina League	Brian Dayett
A	Burlington Bees	Midwest League	Jerry Terrell
Rookie	Bristol White Sox	Appalachian League	R. J. Reynolds
Rookie	AZL White Sox	Arizona League	Jerry Hairston, Sr.
