= 2000 Texas Rangers season =

2000 Texas Rangers
- League: American League
- Division: West
- Ballpark: The Ballpark in Arlington
- City: Arlington, Texas
- Record: 71–91 (.438)
- Divisional place: 4th
- Owners: Tom Hicks
- General managers: Doug Melvin
- Managers: Johnny Oates
- Television: KXTX-TV; KXAS-TV (Tom Grieve, Bill Jones)
- Radio: KRLD (Eric Nadel, Vince Cotroneo); KESS-FM (Eleno Ornelas, Edgar Lopez)

The 2000 Texas Rangers season was the 40th of the Texas Rangers franchise overall, their 29th in Arlington as the Rangers, and their 7th season at The Ballpark in Arlington. The Rangers finished fourth in the American League West with a record of 71 wins and 91 losses.

== Preseason ==
- November 2, 1999: Juan González was traded by the Texas Rangers with Danny Patterson and Gregg Zaun to the Detroit Tigers for Frank Catalanotto, Francisco Cordero, Bill Haselman, Gabe Kapler, Justin Thompson, and Alan Webb (minors).
- January 10, 2000: Jason McDonald signed with the Rangers as a free agent.

== Regular season ==
=== Opening Day starters ===
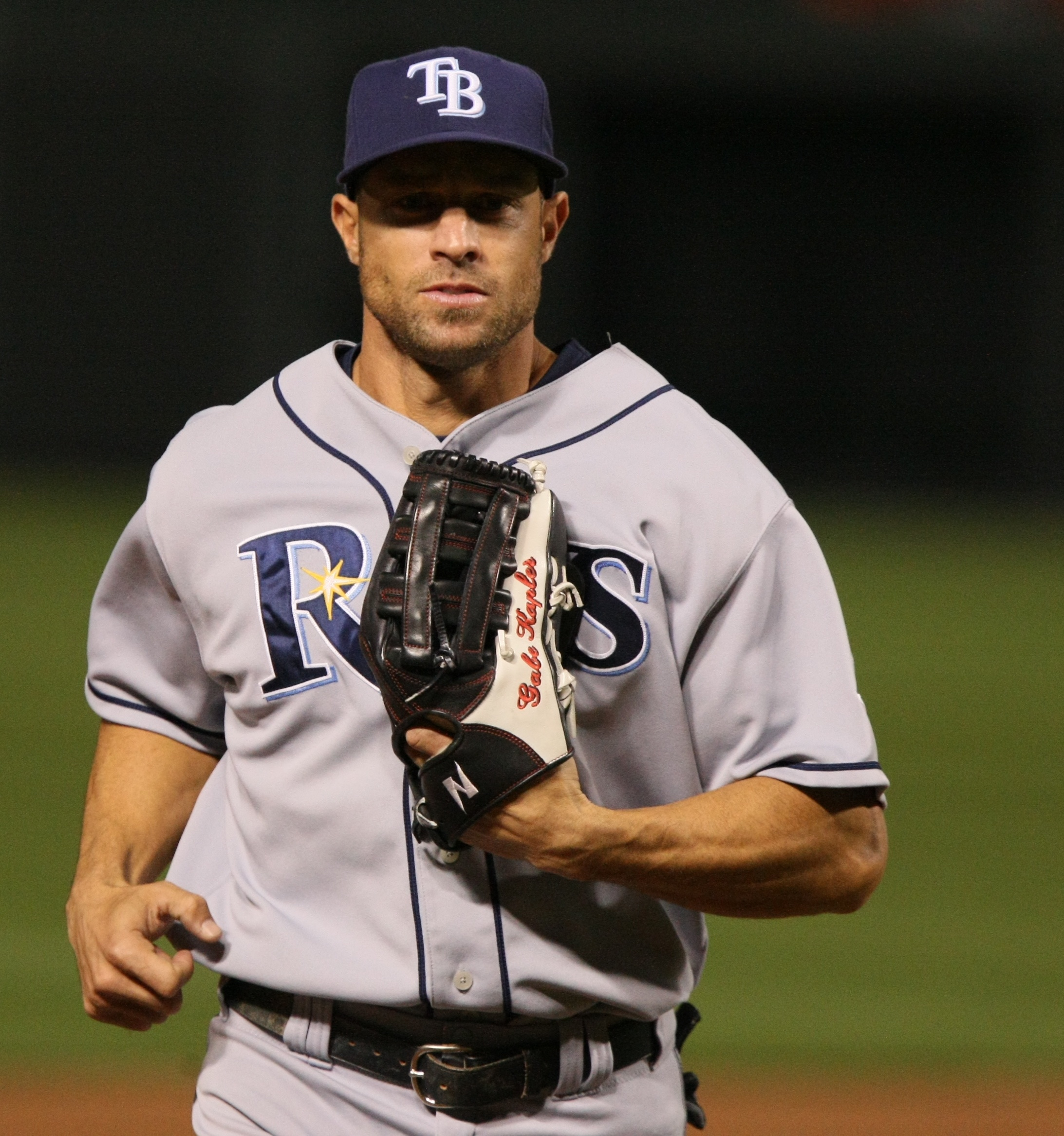
Gabe Kapler

- Iván Rodríguez, C
- Rafael Palmeiro, 1B
- Luis Alicea, 2B
- Tom Evans, 3B
- Royce Clayton, SS
- Rusty Greer, LF
- Rubén Mateo, CF
- Gabe Kapler, RF
- David Segui, DH
- Kenny Rogers, LHP

=== Season standings ===
AL West
Team	W	L	Pct.	GB	Home	Road
Oakland Athletics	91	70	.565	—	47‍–‍34	44‍–‍36
Seattle Mariners	91	71	.562	½	47‍–‍34	44‍–‍37
Anaheim Angels	82	80	.506	9½	46‍–‍35	36‍–‍45
Texas Rangers	71	91	.438	20½	42‍–‍39	29‍–‍52

=== Record vs. opponents ===
2000 American League record Source: MLB Standings Grid – 2000
Team	ANA	BAL	BOS	CWS	CLE	DET	KC	MIN	NYY	OAK	SEA	TB	TEX	TOR	NL
Anaheim	—	7–5	5–4	4–6	3–6	5–5	6–6	7–3	5–5	5–8	5–8	6–6	7–5	5–7	12–6
Baltimore	5–7	—	5–7	4–6	5–4	6–4	3–7	6–3	5–7	4–8	3–7	8–5	6–6	7–6	7–11
Boston	4–5	7–5	—	7–5	6–6	7–5	4–6	8–2	6–7	5–5	5–5	6–6	7–3	4–8	9–9
Chicago	6–4	6–4	5–7	—	8–5	9–3	5–7	7–5	8–4	6–3	7–5	6–4	5–5	5–5	12–6
Cleveland	6–3	4–5	6–6	5–8	—	6–7	5–7	5–8	5–5	6–6	7–2	8–2	6–4	8–4	13–5
Detroit	5–5	4–6	5–7	3–9	7–6	—	5–7	7–6	8–4	6–4	7–2	4–5	5–5	3–9	10–8
Kansas City	6–6	7–3	6–4	7–5	7–5	7–5	—	7–5	2–8	4–8	4–8	5–5	3–7	4–6	8–10
Minnesota	3–7	3–6	2–8	5–7	8–5	6–7	5–7	—	5–5	5–7	3–9	4–6	8–4	5–4	7–11
New York	5–5	7–5	7–6	4–8	5–5	4–8	8–2	5–5	—	6–3	4–6	6–6	10–2	5–7	11–6
Oakland	8–5	8–4	5–5	3–6	6–6	4–6	8–4	7–5	3–6	—	9–4	7–2	5–7	7–3	11–7
Seattle	8–5	7–3	5–5	5–7	2–7	2–7	8–4	9–3	6–4	4–9	—	9–3	7–5	8–2	11–7
Tampa Bay	6–6	5–8	6–6	4–6	2–8	5–4	5–5	6–4	6–6	2–7	3–9	—	5–7	5–7	9–9
Texas	5–7	6–6	3–7	5–5	4–6	5–5	7–3	4–8	2–10	7–5	5–7	7–5	—	4–6	7–11
Toronto	7–5	6–7	8–4	5–5	4–8	9–3	6–4	4–5	7–5	3–7	2–8	7–5	6–4	—	9–9

=== Transactions ===
- July 3, 2000: Mark Clark was released by the Texas Rangers.
- July 19, 2000: Esteban Loaiza was traded by the Texas Rangers to the Toronto Blue Jays for Darwin Cubillán and Michael Young.
- July 28, 2000: Ricky Ledée was traded by the Cleveland Indians to the Texas Rangers for David Segui.

=== Roster ===
2000 Texas Rangers
Roster
Pitchers: 54 Mark Clark; 30 Francisco Cordero; 23 Tim Crabtree; 57 Darwin Cubillán; 46 Doug Davis; 38 Ryan Glynn; 32 Rick Helling; 50 Jonathan Johnson; 52 Dan Kolb; 28 Esteban Loaiza; 51 Mike Munoz; 14 Darren Oliver; 40 Matt Perisho; 37 Kenny Rogers; 49 Brian Sikorski; 43 Mike Venafro; 35 John Wetteland; 59 Jeff Zimmerman	Catchers: 33 Bill Haselman; 55 Randy Knorr; 7 Iván Rodríguez; 39 B. J. Waszgis; Infielders: 10 Luis Alicea; 27 Frank Catalanotto; 11 Royce Clayton; 44 Kelly Dransfeldt; 6 Tom Evans; 13 Mike Lamb; 25 Rafael Palmeiro; 24 David Segui; 4 Scott Sheldon; 2 Michael Young	Outfielders: 3 Chad Curtis; 41 Scarborough Green; 29 Rusty Greer; 18 Gabe Kapler; 12 Ricky Ledée; 1 Dave Martinez; 21 Rubén Mateo; 2 Jason McDonald; 9 Pedro Valdés; Other batters: 21,28 Rubén Sierra	Manager: 26 Johnny Oates; Coaches: 17 Dick Bosman (Pitching); 20 Bucky Dent (Bench); 48 Larry Hardy (Bullpen); 8 Rudy Jaramillo (Hitting); 12 Ed Napoleon (First Base); 5 Jerry Narron (Third Base)

== Player stats ==
=== Batting ===
==== Starters by position ====
Note: Pos = Position; G = Games played; AB = At bats; H = Hits; Avg. = Batting average; HR = Home runs; RBI = Runs batted in

Pos	Player	G	AB	H	Avg.	HR	RBI
C	Iván Rodríguez	91	363	126	.347	27	83
1B	Rafael Palmeiro	158	565	163	.288	39	120
2B	Luis Alicea	139	540	159	.294	6	63
SS	Royce Clayton	148	513	124	.242	14	54
3B	Mike Lamb	138	493	137	.278	6	47
LF	Rusty Greer	105	394	117	.297	8	65
CF	Gabe Kapler	116	444	134	.302	14	66
RF	Ricky Ledée	58	213	50	.235	4	38
DH	David Segui	93	351	118	.336	11	57

==== Other batters ====
Note: G = Games played; AB = At bats; H = Hits; Avg. = Batting average; HR = Home runs; RBI = Runs batted in

Player	G	AB	H	Avg.	HR	RBI
Chad Curtis	108	335	91	.272	8	48
Frank Catalanotto	103	282	82	.291	10	42
Ruben Mateo	52	206	60	.291	7	19
Bill Haselman	62	193	53	.275	6	26
Scarborough Green	79	124	29	.234	0	9
Scott Sheldon	58	124	35	.282	4	19
Dave Martinez	38	119	32	.269	2	12
Jason McDonald	38	94	22	.234	3	13
Ruben Sierra	20	60	14	.233	1	7
Tom Evans	23	54	15	.278	0	5
Pedro Valdés	30	54	15	.278	1	5
B.J. Waszgis	24	45	10	.222	0	4
Randy Knorr	15	34	10	.294	2	2
Kelly Dransfeldt	16	26	3	.115	0	2
Michael Young	2	2	0	.000	0	0

=== Pitching ===
==== Starting pitchers ====
Note: G = Games pitched; IP = Innings pitched; W = Wins; L = Losses; ERA = Earned run average; SO = Strikeouts

Player	G	IP	W	L	ERA	SO
Kenny Rogers	34	227.1	13	13	4.55	127
Rick Helling	35	217.0	16	13	4.48	146
Darren Oliver	21	108.0	2	9	7.42	49
Esteban Loaiza	20	107.1	5	6	5.37	75
Ryan Glynn	16	88.2	5	7	5.58	33

==== Other pitchers ====
Note: G = Games pitched; IP = Innings pitched; W = Wins; L = Losses; ERA = Earned run average; SO = Strikeouts

Player	G	IP	W	L	ERA	SO
Matt Perisho	34	105.0	2	7	7.37	74
Doug Davis	30	98.2	7	6	5.38	66
Mark Clark	12	44.0	3	5	7.98	16
Brian Sikorski	10	37.2	1	3	5.73	32

===== Relief pitchers =====
Note: G = Games pitched; W = Wins; L = Losses; SV = Saves; ERA = Earned run average; SO = Strikeouts

Player	G	W	L	SV	ERA	SO
John Wetteland	62	6	5	34	4.20	53
Mike Venafro	77	3	1	1	3.83	32
Tim Crabtree	68	2	7	2	5.15	54
Jeff Zimmerman	65	4	5	1	5.30	74
Francisco Cordero	56	1	2	0	5.35	49
Jonathan Johnson	15	1	1	0	6.21	23
Darwin Cubillán	13	0	0	0	10.70	13
Mike Munoz	7	0	1	0	13.50	1
Danny Kolb	1	0	0	0	67.50	0
Scott Sheldon	1	0	0	0	0.00	1

== Awards and honors ==
- Iván Rodríguez, C, Gold Glove
- Kenny Rogers, P, Gold Glove

All-Star Game

== Farm system ==
Level	Team	League	Manager
AAA	Oklahoma RedHawks	Pacific Coast League	DeMarlo Hale
AA	Tulsa Drillers	Texas League	Bobby Jones and Jim Byrd
A	Charlotte Rangers	Florida State League	Jim Byrd and Bobby Miscik
A	Savannah Sand Gnats	South Atlantic League	Paul Carey
Rookie	Pulaski Rangers	Appalachian League	Bruce Crabbe
Rookie	GCL Rangers	Gulf Coast League	Darryl Kennedy

LEAGUE CHAMPIONS: GCL Rangers
