= Scott Eyre =

American baseball player (born 1972)

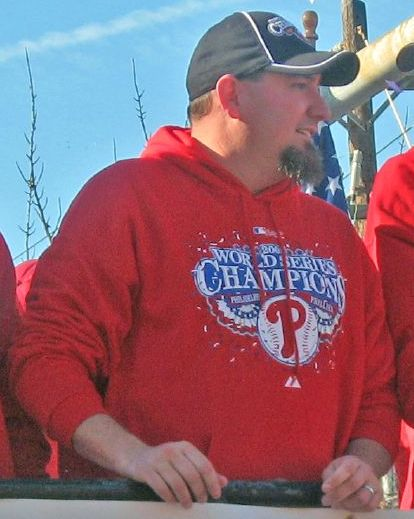
- Eyre at the 2008 World Series parade
- Pitcher
- Born: May 30, 1972 (age 54); Inglewood, California, U.S.
- Batted: Left Threw: Left

MLB debut
- August 1, 1997, for the Chicago White Sox

Last MLB appearance
- October 4, 2009, for the Philadelphia Phillies

MLB statistics
- Win–loss record: 28–30
- Earned run average: 4.23
- Strikeouts: 537
- Stats at Baseball Reference

Teams
- Chicago White Sox (1997–2000); Toronto Blue Jays (2001–2002); San Francisco Giants (2002–2005); Chicago Cubs (2006–2008); Philadelphia Phillies (2008–2009)

Career highlights and awards
- World Series champion (2008)

Scott Alan Eyre (born May 30, 1972), is an American former professional baseball left-handed pitcher, who played in Major League Baseball (MLB) for the Chicago White Sox, Toronto Blue Jays, San Francisco Giants, Chicago Cubs, and Philadelphia Phillies.

== Early life ==
Eyre was born on May 30, 1972, in Inglewood, California. He was the oldest of five children in his family, born when his mother Peggy was only 17 years old. When Eyre was eight years old, his father Bob left the family and kept only marginal contact with his wife and children; Eyre was responsible for his younger siblings throughout their respective childhoods. Eyre's undiagnosed attention deficit hyperactivity disorder (ADHD) made it difficult for him to pay attention in school, and he preferred playing sports, particularly baseball.

Both Eyre and his brother Willie played high school baseball for Cyprus High School in Magna, Utah. During his senior year, Eyre pitched three complete games in a state tournament, striking out 50 batters and allowing only four hits across those three games. His coach, Bob Fratto, once referred to Eyre as "the best pitcher ever to come out of Utah". After high school, the Cleveland Indians of Major League Baseball (MLB) offered Eyre a free agent contract, which he turned down in order to pursue a junior college career. He spent the 1991 college baseball season at the College of Southern Idaho, where he posted a 6–1 win–loss record, eight saves, and led the team with 74 strikeouts.

== Career ==
=== Draft and minor leagues ===
The Texas Rangers selected Eyre in the ninth round of the 1991 MLB draft, but it was not immediately clear if he would sign with the team or if he would play for another year at Southern Idaho. He turned down the Rangers' initial $40,000 signing bonus, preferring to attend another year of college, but ultimately signed with the team when they increased their offer to $44,000. Eyre made his professional baseball debut in 1992, playing the whole season with the Rookie-level Butte Copper Kings of the Pioneer League. There, he went 7–3 with a 2.90 earned run average (ERA) and 94 strikeouts in 15 games (14 starts) and 80 2/3 innings pitched.

Eyre became a serious prospect during the 1992–1993 offseason, during which he experienced a growth spurt of 3 inches (76 mm) and 20 pounds (9.1 kg). With a 5–2 record and 2.76 ERA in his first nine starts with the Class A Charleston Rainbows, the director of the Rangers' farm system, Marty Scott, referred to Eyre as "one of the top left-handers in the organization". Despite a midseason slump, Eyre finished the season with an 11–7 record, a 3.45 ERA, and 154 strikeouts in 143 2/3 innings. The Rangers, still concerned about his slender frame, devised an exercise regimen for Eyre to build muscle mass and upper body strength during the offseason.

On March 29, 1994, the Rangers traded Eyre to the Chicago White Sox in exchange for shortstop Esteban Beltre. His season with the Class A South Bend Silver Hawks came to a premature end that August after suffering a torn ligament in his arm during a game. Before the injury, Eyre had pitched in 19 games and 111 2/3 innings for South Bend, posting an 8–4 record, 3.47 ERA, and 111 strikeouts in the process. During the offseason, Eyre underwent a type of Tommy John surgery in which a different ligament from his right calf was surgically grafted into his arm, limiting mobility in both limbs., He spent most of the following year rehabilitating from the torn ligament, with a handful of appearances in the Gulf Coast League (GCL). In nine GCL games, Eyre went 0–2 with a 2.30 ERA and struck out 40 batters in 27 1/3 innings. In 1996, Eyre joined the Double-A Birmingham Barons, with whom he went 12–7 with a 4.38 ERA and 137 strikeouts in 27 games and 158 1/3 innings.

=== Chicago White Sox (1997–2000) ===
Eyre started the 1997 season in Birmingham once again, going 13–5 before receiving his first major league call-up on August 1 as a replacement for Wilson Alvarez, who had been traded to the San Francisco Giants. He faced Nelson Cruz of the Anaheim Angels, who was also making his MLB debut that night. Eyre, who needed directions from a local cameraman to find the White Sox clubhouse before the game, allowed six runs and six hits in the first 4 1/3 innings of a 9–1 loss to the Angels. Eyre picked up his first major league win two weeks later, with six hits and two runs in five innings of a 5–2 victory against the Angels on August 14. Unlike fellow call-up Carlos Castillo, who spent the remainder of the season in the Chicago bullpen, Eyre remained part of an unusually young starting rotation for the White Sox through the end of the year. At 25 years old, he was only one year younger than James Baldwin and Jason Bere, the oldest pitchers in the rotation by season's end. Eyre finished his rookie season with a 4–4 record, a 5.04 ERA, and 36 strikeouts in 11 games and 60 2/3 innings for the White Sox.

That Eyre was not sent back down to the minor leagues after his MLB debut gave him hope that he would be a permanent fixture in the White Sox' 1998 starting rotation. New manager Jerry Manuel decided to open the season with an inexpensive, young group of pitchers that included Eyre, Baldwin, Bere, Mike Sirotka, and Jaime Navarro. Eyre ran into trouble early in the season: he did not secure a win until April 26, and by mid-June, with 43 walks in 12 starts, Eyre was preparing for a demotion. Although he anticipated that he would return to the minor leagues, Manuel instead sent Eyre to the bullpen. He did not start again for the White Sox until August 13, when he pitched five no-hit innings against the Oakland Athletics and claimed only his second win of the season. On the night of September 14 into the morning of September 15, Eyre was the winning pitcher in a 33-run, 12-inning game between the White Sox and the Detroit Tigers. After allowing an unearned run in the bottom of the 12th, Eyre struck out Bobby Higginson to end the game in a 17–16 victory. Eyre made 33 appearances for the White Sox in 1998, 17 starts and 16 in relief. In the process, he went 3–8 with a 5.38 ERA and 73 strikeouts in 107 innings.

After struggling throughout spring training, Eyre was demoted to the Triple-A Charlotte Knights to open the 1999 season. Castillo and Tom Fordham also received demotions to Triple-A, and attempted to use the experience as motivation to return to the majors as fast as they could. Eyre was called back up on June 20 in place of a struggling Dave Lundquist, who was sent back down. He remained in the Chicago bullpen until August 30, when he suffered a rotator cuff injury to his throwing arm and had to be placed on the disabled list. Eyre made 21 major league appearances in 1999, all in relief, and posted a 1–1 record with a 7.56 ERA in 25 innings. He also played 12 games (11 starts) for Charlotte, going 6–4 with a 3.82 ERA in 68 1/3 innings.

The White Sox carried two left-handed relievers into the start of the 2000 season: Eyre and Kelly Wunsch. After going 1–1 with a 6.63 ERA in a few scattered outings, Eyre was optioned to Charlotte on May 26, with fellow left-hander Jesús Peña called up to take his place. Eyre suspected that the reason for the demotion had less to do with his own performance and more with the overcrowded bullpen, telling reporters, "When you only pitch four innings in a month, something's got to be wrong." He fractured his left hand in Charlotte on August 31 after being struck by a line drive off the bat of a member of the Norfolk Tides, but recorded the out by throwing the ball to first base with his uninjured right hand. Eyre made 47 appearances for Charlotte, all in relief, and went 3–2 with a 3.00 ERA, 12 saves, and 46 strikeouts in 48 innings.

=== Toronto Blue Jays (2001–2002) ===
On November 8, 2000, the White Sox traded Eyre to the Toronto Blue Jays in exchange for pitching prospect Gary Glover. His new teammates began to notice Eyre's constant fidgeting on the mound during the 2001 season, and the team therapist suggested that he may have attention deficit hyperactivity disorder (ADHD). Eyre dismissed the concept until one instance when his catcher tried to talk to him between pitches, and as soon as the conversation ended, Eyre could not recall what had been said between them. He received an ADHD diagnosis from an independent psychiatrist and began taking Concerta for games.

In his first season with Toronto, Eyre saved 2 games in 15 games. In 2002, Eyre made 3 spot starts while also making 46 relief appearances for the Blue Jays, going 2–4 with a 4.97 ERA.

=== San Francisco Giants (2002–2005) ===
Eyre was selected off waivers from the Blue Jays by the San Francisco Giants in 2002. He made the transition to the National League impressively as he had a 1.59 ERA in 21 games for the Giants.

In 2003, Eyre appeared in 74 games with a 3.32 ERA. He was rewarded with a 2-year contract extension after the season. In 2004 Eyre appeared in 83 games while in 2005 he led the Majors in appearances, pitching in 86 games. He would eventually finish 30th in the NL MVP voting at the end of the season.

=== Chicago Cubs (2006–2008) ===
On November 18, 2005, Eyre signed a three-year contract with the Chicago Cubs and pitched his way to an ERA of 3.38. He was one of the more consistently used relievers on a pitching staff that often struggled. He was used mainly in 7th and 8th inning situations in tandem with Bob Howry with Eyre being used more often in lefty vs. lefty situations.

Eyre has noted that Lou Piniella could not remember his name for the longest time and called him "Stevie" for a while, jokingly, even after he learned Scott's real name. According to Cubs play-by-play broadcaster Len Kasper, Piniella has since begun intentionally pronouncing his name "Stevie Aye-er."

During a game against the Houston Astros on September 12, 2007, Eyre left the Cubs’ bullpen, and wandered around Minute Maid Park. WGN’s cameras eventually spotted him watching the game through an opening in the stadium’s score board.

On June 15, 2008, in a game against the Toronto Blue Jays, Eyre allowed a 1-out sac fly run, ending his streak of 33 consecutive appearances without allowing a run, a Cubs franchise record.

=== Philadelphia Phillies (2008–2009) ===
On August 5, 2008, Eyre was designated for assignment to make room for Kerry Wood, who was coming off the disabled list. He was traded to the Philadelphia Phillies two days later for Brian Schlitter. However, the move allowed Eyre to win his first World Series ring when the Phillies won the 2008 World Series.

In November, 2008, following the World Series, Scott re-signed with the Phillies as a free-agent, and was signed through the 2009 season. On November 12, 2009, Eyre was granted free agency.

=== Retirement ===
Eyre announced his retirement from MLB on January 8, 2010. He finished his career with a 28–30 record and a 4.23 ERA in 617 games with five teams across 13 major league seasons. He said that the decision was not because the Phillies declined to offer him a contract for the 2010 season, but that "I had most of this retirement thing planned out ... I think even if [the team] would have offered me a better contract, I still don't think I would have taken it." After his retirement, Eyre began coaching the baseball team at Saint Stephen's Episcopal School in Bradenton, Florida, where his son played as a first baseman and designated hitter. Beginning in 2015, Eyre regularly faced his brother Willie, who became the coach for the rival Canterbury School.

== Personal ==
Eyre's brother, Willie, is also a former pitcher in the major leagues. They have another, younger brother, Robert Grace, who played in the minor league system of the San Francisco Giants from 2005–2007. All three are pitchers.

Eyre was one of the victims of the $8 billion fraud perpetrated by wealth manager Allen Stanford. In February 2009 Eyre admitted that he was broke and had to receive an advance on his salary from the Phillies.

Eyre publicly acknowledged that he has adult attention-deficit disorder.

Currently, Eyre is the pitching coach for his kid's high school baseball team (Saint Stephens Episcopal School) in Bradenton, Florida.
