= Cal Eldred =

American baseball player and coach (born 1967)

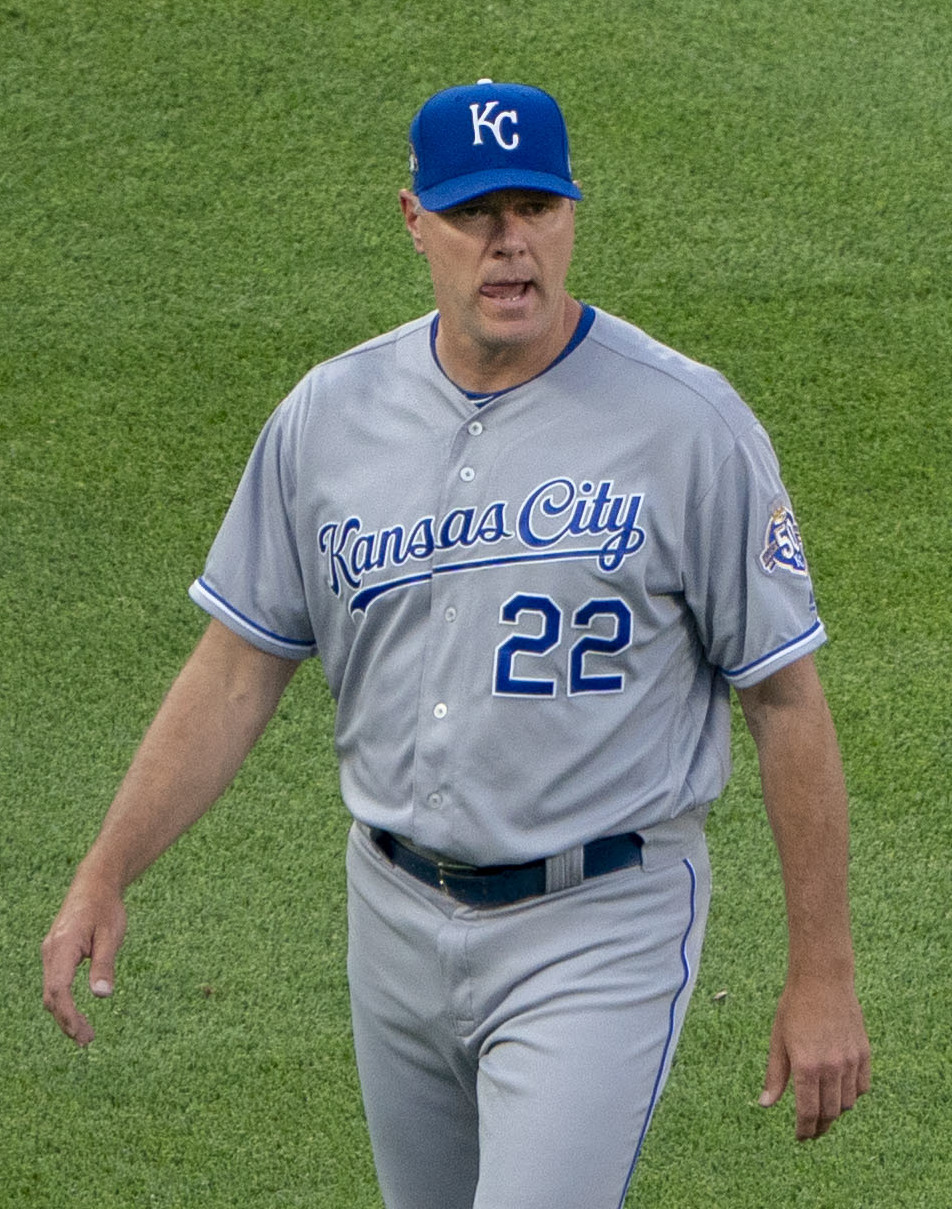
- Eldred with the Kansas City Royals
- Pitcher
- Born: November 24, 1967 (age 58); Cedar Rapids, Iowa, U.S.
- Batted: Right Threw: Right

MLB debut
- September 24, 1991, for the Milwaukee Brewers

Last MLB appearance
- October 1, 2005, for the St. Louis Cardinals

MLB statistics
- Win–loss record: 86–74
- Earned run average: 4.42
- Strikeouts: 939
- Stats at Baseball Reference

Teams
- Milwaukee Brewers (1991–1999); Chicago White Sox (2000–2001); St. Louis Cardinals (2003–2005)

Career highlights and awards
- Milwaukee Brewers Wall of Honor

Calvin John Eldred (born November 24, 1967) is an American former professional baseball pitcher who played for 14 seasons in Major League Baseball (MLB) from 1991 to 2005. He previously worked for the St. Louis Cardinals as a special assistant to general manager John Mozeliak, instructing minor league players for various on-field and off-field issues. He was also the pitching coach for the Kansas City Royals from 2018 to 2022.

Eldred attended the University of Iowa while playing college baseball for the Hawkeyes, and was the Milwaukee Brewers' first round selection in the 1989 amateur draft. He made his MLB debut for the Brewers in September, 1991, with whom he was a starting pitcher for nine seasons. He also played for the Chicago White Sox and the Cardinals.

== Professional playing career ==
After attending the University of Iowa and playing college baseball for the Hawkeyes, the Milwaukee Brewers selected Eldred in the first round of the 1989 amateur draft.

Making his major league debut with the Brewers on September 24, 1991, Eldred earned the win against the New York Yankees with 5 1/3 innings pitched (IP). He started three games that year, winning two, and completed 16 IP. In 1992, he finished with 100 1/3 IP, a 1.79 earned run average (ERA) and an 11–2 win–loss record (W–L). He was the AL September Pitcher of the Month and finished fourth in the American League (AL) Rookie of the Year Award voting. The next season, Eldred led the AL in innings pitched (258) and MLB in games started (36). He also finished in the top ten in the league in wins (16), strikeouts (180), complete games (eight), hits per nine innings allowed (8.093), home runs allowed (32), hits allowed (232) and bases on balls allowed (91), each of which led the Brewers' pitching staff, except hits.

The Brewers traded Eldred with José Valentín to the Chicago White Sox for Jaime Navarro and John Snyder on January 12, 2000. Eldred pitched for the White Sox in 2000–01, but totaled just 22 starts. His record in 2000 was 10–2 and he was the AL Pitcher of the Month for June. He missed all of the 2002 season due to injury and signed as a free agent with the St. Louis Cardinals on December 18, 2002. He pitched in relief for the National League pennant-winning Cardinals in 2004, and made two appearances in the World Series. Eldred announced his retirement as a player on October 27, 2005. He was the Cardinals winner of the 2005 Darryl Kile Good Guy Award.

== Post-playing career ==
Eldred also joined the Big Ten Network in the spring of 2009 as a college baseball analyst. He co-hosted the network's studio coverage of the 2009 Big Ten Baseball Tournament with Dave Revsine. He was a pregame color analyst for the team's telecasts on Fox Sports Midwest. He also was a special assistant to Cardinals' general manager John Mozeliak, instructing minor league players for various on-field and off-field issues.

In November 2017, Eldred was named the Kansas City Royals pitching coach. He was fired on October 5, 2022, immediately after the season ended, with the 2022 team being worst in the American League for strikeouts, walks, hits allowed, runs allowed, and ERA.

== Personal life ==
Both of Eldred's sons played collegiately. C.J. was a pitcher for the Iowa Hawkeyes and Luke was a pitcher for Dallas Baptist. C.J. was signed by the Kansas City Royals as an undrafted free agent and has played for numerous professional teams.

Preceded by Dave Eiland	Kansas City Royals pitching coach 2018–2022	Succeeded by Brian Sweeney
