= 2000 Oakland Athletics season =

2000 Oakland Athletics
- American League West champions
- League: American League
- Division: West
- Ballpark: Network Associates Coliseum
- City: Oakland, California
- Record: 91–70 (.565)
- Divisional place: 1st
- Owners: Stephen Schott & Kenneth Hofmann
- General managers: Billy Beane
- Managers: Art Howe
- Television: KICU-TV; FSN Bay Area (Ray Fosse, Greg Papa)
- Radio: KABL (Bill King, Ken Korach, Ray Fosse)

The Oakland Athletics' 2000 season was the team's 33rd in Oakland, California. It was also the 100th season in franchise history. The team finished first in the American League West with a record of 91–70.

The A's, in winning the division, snapped an eight-year postseason drought. The division championship was also the first of the so-called "Moneyball" era. Over the next six seasons, the Athletics would reach the postseason a total of four additional times.

The season saw the debuts of eventual ace starters Barry Zito and Mark Mulder. These two pitchers, along with Tim Hudson (who had debuted one year prior), would comprise the top of Oakland's rotation (known popularly as the "Big Three") until the end of the 2004 season. Of the three, Hudson fared the best in 2000; he won twenty games (the most in the American League) and reached the All-Star Game in his first full season as a starter. For his efforts, Hudson finished second in that year's American League Cy Young Award voting.

The Athletics also boasted a strong offense. The team scored 947 runs (an Oakland record) over the course of the season; this figure was the third-highest in the American League. The offense was led by Jason Giambi, who won the American League MVP Award at the end of the season. The team collectively hit 239 home runs in 2000 (also an Oakland record); in total, nine different Athletics hit at least ten home runs.

The Athletics fought the Seattle Mariners in the standings for most of the season. In the end, the Athletics narrowly prevailed; they finished only half a game ahead of the 91–71 Mariners (who won the AL Wild Card). The Athletics then played the New York Yankees in the ALDS. They would lose the best-of-five series three games to two.

== Offseason ==
- December 30, 1999: Scott Service was signed as a free agent by the Athletics.
- December 30, 1999: Rich Becker was signed as a free agent by the Athletics.

== Regular season ==
- May 29, 2000: Randy Velarde of the Athletics had an unassisted triple play. He caught a liner, tagged the runner coming from first base and touched second base.

=== Season standings ===
AL West
Team	W	L	Pct.	GB	Home	Road
Oakland Athletics	91	70	.565	—	47‍–‍34	44‍–‍36
Seattle Mariners	91	71	.562	½	47‍–‍34	44‍–‍37
Anaheim Angels	82	80	.506	9½	46‍–‍35	36‍–‍45
Texas Rangers	71	91	.438	20½	42‍–‍39	29‍–‍52

=== Record vs. opponents ===
2000 American League record Source: MLB Standings Grid – 2000
Team	ANA	BAL	BOS	CWS	CLE	DET	KC	MIN	NYY	OAK	SEA	TB	TEX	TOR	NL
Anaheim	—	7–5	5–4	4–6	3–6	5–5	6–6	7–3	5–5	5–8	5–8	6–6	7–5	5–7	12–6
Baltimore	5–7	—	5–7	4–6	5–4	6–4	3–7	6–3	5–7	4–8	3–7	8–5	6–6	7–6	7–11
Boston	4–5	7–5	—	7–5	6–6	7–5	4–6	8–2	6–7	5–5	5–5	6–6	7–3	4–8	9–9
Chicago	6–4	6–4	5–7	—	8–5	9–3	5–7	7–5	8–4	6–3	7–5	6–4	5–5	5–5	12–6
Cleveland	6–3	4–5	6–6	5–8	—	6–7	5–7	5–8	5–5	6–6	7–2	8–2	6–4	8–4	13–5
Detroit	5–5	4–6	5–7	3–9	7–6	—	5–7	7–6	8–4	6–4	7–2	4–5	5–5	3–9	10–8
Kansas City	6–6	7–3	6–4	7–5	7–5	7–5	—	7–5	2–8	4–8	4–8	5–5	3–7	4–6	8–10
Minnesota	3–7	3–6	2–8	5–7	8–5	6–7	5–7	—	5–5	5–7	3–9	4–6	8–4	5–4	7–11
New York	5–5	7–5	7–6	4–8	5–5	4–8	8–2	5–5	—	6–3	4–6	6–6	10–2	5–7	11–6
Oakland	8–5	8–4	5–5	3–6	6–6	4–6	8–4	7–5	3–6	—	9–4	7–2	5–7	7–3	11–7
Seattle	8–5	7–3	5–5	5–7	2–7	2–7	8–4	9–3	6–4	4–9	—	9–3	7–5	8–2	11–7
Tampa Bay	6–6	5–8	6–6	4–6	2–8	5–4	5–5	6–4	6–6	2–7	3–9	—	5–7	5–7	9–9
Texas	5–7	6–6	3–7	5–5	4–6	5–5	7–3	4–8	2–10	7–5	5–7	7–5	—	4–6	7–11
Toronto	7–5	6–7	8–4	5–5	4–8	9–3	6–4	4–5	7–5	3–7	2–8	7–5	6–4	—	9–9

=== Notable transactions ===
- May 5, 2000: Rich Becker was released by the Athletics.
- June 5, 2000: Rich Harden was drafted by the Athletics in the 17th round of the 2000 Major League Baseball draft. Player signed May 18, 2001.
- July 6, 2000: Mike Mohler was signed as a free agent by the Athletics.
- August 30, 2000: Jorge Velandia was traded by the Athletics to the New York Mets for Nelson Cruz.

=== Roster ===
2000 Oakland Athletics
Roster
Pitchers: 19 Kevin Appier; 59 Todd Belitz; 31 Gil Heredia; 15 Tim Hudson; 48 Jason Isringhausen; 24 Doug Jones; 33 Marcus Jones; 52 Mike Magnante; 17 Ron Mahay; 33 T.J. Mathews; 45,48 Jim Mecir; 20 Mark Mulder; 40 Omar Olivares; 30 Ariel Prieto; 54 Jon Ratliff; 56 Rich Sauveur; 26 Scott Service; 29 Jeff Tam; 61 Luis Vizcaíno; 53 Barry Zito	Catchers: 6 Sal Fasano; 55 Ramón Hernández; 23 A. J. Hinch; Infielders: 49 Mark Bellhorn; 3 Eric Chavez; 16 Jason Giambi; 11 Frank Menechino; 60 José Ortiz; 9 Olmedo Sáenz; 10 Mike Stanley; 4 Miguel Tejada; 50 Mario Valdez; 13 Jorge Velandia; 8 Randy Velarde	Outfielders: 22 Rich Becker; 22 Eric Byrnes; 28 Ryan Christenson; 7 Jeremy Giambi; 14 Ben Grieve; 37 Terrence Long; 36 Adam Piatt; 21 Bo Porter; 12 Matt Stairs; Other batters: 5 John Jaha	Manager: 18 Art Howe; Coaches: 41 Thad Bosley (Hitting); 35 Brad Fischer (Bullpen); 39 Ken Macha (Bench); 47 Rick Peterson (Pitching); 45 Mike Quade (First Base); 38 Ron Washington (Third Base)

== Player stats ==
= Indicates team leader

=== Batting ===
==== Starters by position ====
Note: Pos = Position; G = Games played; AB = At bats; H = Hits; Avg. = Batting average; HR = Home runs; RBI = Runs batted in

Pos	Player	G	AB	H	Avg.	HR	RBI
C	Ramón Hernández	143	419	101	.241	14	62
1B	Jason Giambi	152	510	170	.333	43	137
2B	Randy Velarde	122	485	135	.278	12	41
SS	Miguel Tejada	160	607	167	.275	30	115
3B	Eric Chavez	153	501	139	.277	26	86
LF	Ben Grieve	158	594	166	.279	27	104
CF	Terrence Long	138	584	168	.288	18	80
RF	Matt Stairs	143	476	108	.227	21	81
DH	Olmedo Sáenz	76	214	67	.313	9	37

==== Other batters ====
Note: G = Games played; AB = At bats; H = Hits; Avg. = Batting average; HR = Home runs; RBI = Runs batted in

Player	G	AB	H	Avg.	HR	RBI
Jeremy Giambi	104	260	66	.254	10	50
Adam Piatt	60	157	47	.299	5	23
Frank Menechino	66	145	37	.255	6	26
Ryan Christenson	121	129	32	.248	4	18
Sal Fasano	52	126	27	.214	7	19
Mike Stanley	32	97	26	.268	4	18
John Jaha	33	97	17	.175	1	5
Rich Becker	23	47	11	.234	1	5
Jorge Velandia	18	24	3	.125	0	2
Mark Bellhorn	9	13	2	.154	0	0
Bo Porter	17	13	2	.154	1	2
Mario Valdez	5	12	0	.000	0	0
José Ortiz	7	11	2	.182	0	1
Eric Byrnes	10	10	3	.300	0	0
A. J. Hinch	6	8	2	.250	0	0

=== Pitching ===
= Indicates league leader

==== Starting pitchers ====
Note: G = Games pitched; IP = Innings pitched; W = Wins; L = Losses; ERA = Earned run average; SO = Strikeouts

Player	G	IP	W	L	ERA	SO
Tim Hudson	32	202.1	20*	4	4.14	169
Gil Heredia	32	198.2	15	11	4.12	101
Kevin Appier	31	195.1	15	11	4.54	129
Mark Mulder	27	154.0	9	10	5.44	88
Barry Zito	14	92.2	7	4	2.72	78
Marcus Jones	1	2.1	0	0	15.43	1

- Tied with David Wells (Toronto) for league lead

==== Other pitchers ====
Note; G = Games pitched; IP = Innings pitched; W = Wins; L = Losses; ERA = Earned run average; SO = Strikeouts

Player	G	IP	W	L	ERA	SO
Omar Olivares	21	108.0	4	8	6.75	57
Ariel Prieto	8	31.2	1	2	5.12	19
Ron Mahay	5	16.0	0	1	9.00	5

==== Relief pitchers ====
Note: G = Games pitched; W = Wins; L = Losses; SV = Saves; ERA = Earned run average; SO = Strikeouts

Player	G	W	L	SV	ERA	SO
Jason Isringhausen	66	6	4	33	3.78	57
Jeff Tam	72	3	3	3	2.63	46
Mike Magnante	55	1	1	0	4.31	17
Doug Jones	54	4	2	2	3.93	54
T.J. Mathews	50	2	3	0	6.03	42
Jim Mecir	25	3	1	4	2.80	37
Scott Service	20	1	2	1	6.38	35
Luis Vizcaíno	12	0	1	0	7.45	18
Rich Sauveur	10	0	0	0	4.35	7
Todd Belitz	5	0	0	0	2.70	3
Frank Menechino	1	0	0	0	36.00	0
Jon Ratliff	1	0	0	0	0.00	0

== Postseason ==
=== Game 1, October 3 ===
Network Associates Coliseum in Oakland, California

Team	1	2	3	4	5	6	7	8	9	R	H	E
New York	0	2	0	0	0	1	0	0	0	3	7	0
Oakland	0	0	0	0	3	1	0	1	X	5	10	2
WP: Gil Heredia (1-0) LP: Roger Clemens (0-1) Sv: Jason Isringhausen (1)

=== Game 2, October 4 ===
Network Associates Coliseum in Oakland, California

Team	1	2	3	4	5	6	7	8	9	R	H	E
New York	0	0	0	0	0	3	0	0	1	4	8	1
Oakland	0	0	0	0	0	0	0	0	0	0	6	1
WP: Andy Pettitte (1-0) LP: Kevin Appier (0-1) Sv: Mariano Rivera (1)

=== Game 3, October 6 ===
Yankee Stadium in New York City

Team	1	2	3	4	5	6	7	8	9	R	H	E
Oakland	0	1	0	0	1	0	0	0	0	2	4	2
New York	0	2	0	1	0	0	0	1	X	4	6	1
WP: Orlando Hernández (1-0) LP: Tim Hudson (0-1) Sv: Mariano Rivera (2); Home runs: OAK: Terrence Long (1); NYY: None

=== Game 4, October 7 ===
Yankee Stadium in New York City

Team	1	2	3	4	5	6	7	8	9	R	H	E
Oakland	3	0	0	0	0	3	0	1	4	11	11	0
New York	0	0	0	0	0	1	0	0	0	1	8	0
WP: Barry Zito (1-0) LP: Roger Clemens (0-2); Home runs: OAK: Olmedo Sáenz (1); NYY: None

=== Game 5, October 8 ===
Network Associates Coliseum in Oakland, California

Team	1	2	3	4	5	6	7	8	9	R	H	E
New York	6	0	0	1	0	0	0	0	0	7	12	0
Oakland	0	2	1	2	0	0	0	0	0	5	13	0
WP: Mike Stanton (1-0) LP: Gil Heredia (1-1) Sv: Mariano Rivera (3); Home runs: NYY: David Justice (1); OAK: None

=== Composite box ===
2000 ALDS (3-2): New York Yankees over Oakland Athletics

Team	1	2	3	4	5	6	7	8	9	R	H	E
New York Yankees	6	4	0	2	0	5	0	1	1	19	41	2
Oakland Athletics	3	3	1	2	4	4	0	2	4	23	44	5
Total attendance: 249,911 Average attendance: 49,982

== Awards and records ==
- Jason Giambi, AL MVP award
- Jason Giambi, Hutch Award
  - 2000 Major League Baseball All-Star Game
- Jason Giambi, American League first baseman, starter
- Tim Hudson, pitcher, reserve
- Jason Isringhausen, pitcher, reserve

== Farm system ==
Level	Team	League	Manager
AAA	Sacramento River Cats	Pacific Coast League	Bob Geren
AA	Midland RockHounds	Texas League	Tony DeFrancesco
A	Modesto A's	California League	Greg Sparks
A	Visalia Oaks	California League	Juan Navarrette
A-Short Season	Vancouver Canadians	Northwest League	Dave Joppie
Rookie	AZL Athletics	Arizona League	John Kuehl
