= Bill Simas =

American baseball player (born 1971)

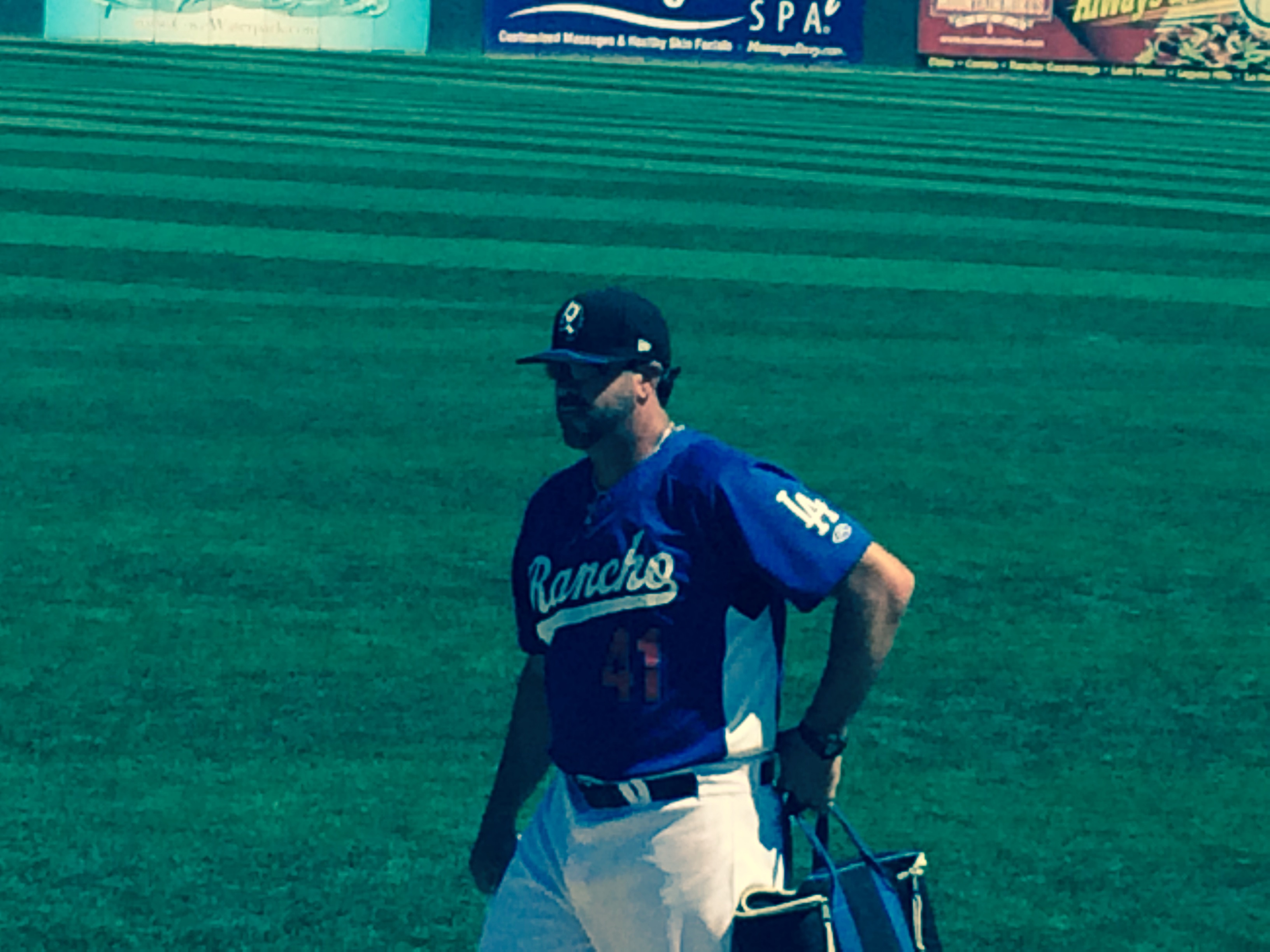
- Simas as pitching coach for the Rancho Cucamonga Quakes in 2015
- Pitcher
- Born: November 28, 1971 (age 54); Hanford, California, U.S.
- Batted: Left Threw: Right

MLB debut
- August 15, 1995, for the Chicago White Sox

Last MLB appearance
- September 30, 2000, for the Chicago White Sox

MLB statistics
- Win–loss record: 18–19
- Earned run average: 3.83
- Strikeouts: 265
- Stats at Baseball Reference

Teams
- Chicago White Sox (1995–2000)

William Anthony Simas (born November 28, 1971) is an American former professional baseball pitcher. He played for the Chicago White Sox from 1995-2000. He is currently the pitching coach for the AAA Round Rock Express.

== Career ==
Simas played amateur ball at St. Joseph High School and at Fresno City College. He was drafted by the California Angels in the 6th round of the 1992 MLB draft. He remained with the Angels organization through 1995, playing with the Boise Hawks (Class A Northwest League), Cedar Rapids Kernels & Lake Elsinore Storm (Class A-Advanced California League), Midland Angels (Class AA Texas League) and Vancouver Canadians (Class AAA Pacific Coast League).

On July 27, 1995 he was traded (with McKay Christensen, Andrew Lorraine and John Snyder) to the Chicago White Sox for Jim Abbott and Tim Fortugno. After starting in AAA with the Nashville Sounds, Simas made his Major League debut on August 15 against the Angels, pitching a scoreless inning of relief. He made 14 relief appearances for the White Sox in 1995, with a 2.57 ERA.

Simas became a solid member of the White Sox bullpen through 2000, and had an 18-19 record and 3.83 ERA in 308 Major League games, including saving 23 games. He underwent Tommy John surgery in December 2000 and missed the entire 2001 season.

He was signed as a minor league free agent by the Detroit Tigers on February 20, 2002 but was not fully recovered from his surgery and did not appear in any games in the system before he was released on May 23. He was re-signed by the White Sox on May 25 and pitched in 28 games with the Charlotte Knights in AAA. He signed a minor league contract with the Los Angeles Dodgers on February 21, 2003 that contained a spring training invitation. He appeared in 26 games for the Las Vegas 51s with a 1.96 ERA. He also started 3 games, the first time he had started since 1992 with Boise.

He pitched for the Long Island Ducks of the Atlantic League of Professional Baseball in 2004 before he was picked up in August by the Seattle Mariners and got into 9 late season games for the Tacoma Rainiers. After spending 2005 in the Mexican League he was out of baseball until 2009-2010 when he returned to pitch for the Ducks again.

== Later life ==
Simas retired from baseball in 2011 and became the pitching coach for the Ogden Raptors, the Dodgers rookie-class team in the Pioneer Baseball League. He was promoted to pitching coach for the Class-A Great Lakes Loons in 2013 and to the advanced-A Rancho Cucamonga Quakes in 2015. In 2016, he was named pitching coach for the AA Tulsa Drillers of the Texas League.

For the 2018 season he was promoted to the pitching coach for the AAA Oklahoma City Dodgers of the Pacific Coast League.
