= Jerry Manuel =

American baseball player, coach and manager (born 1953)

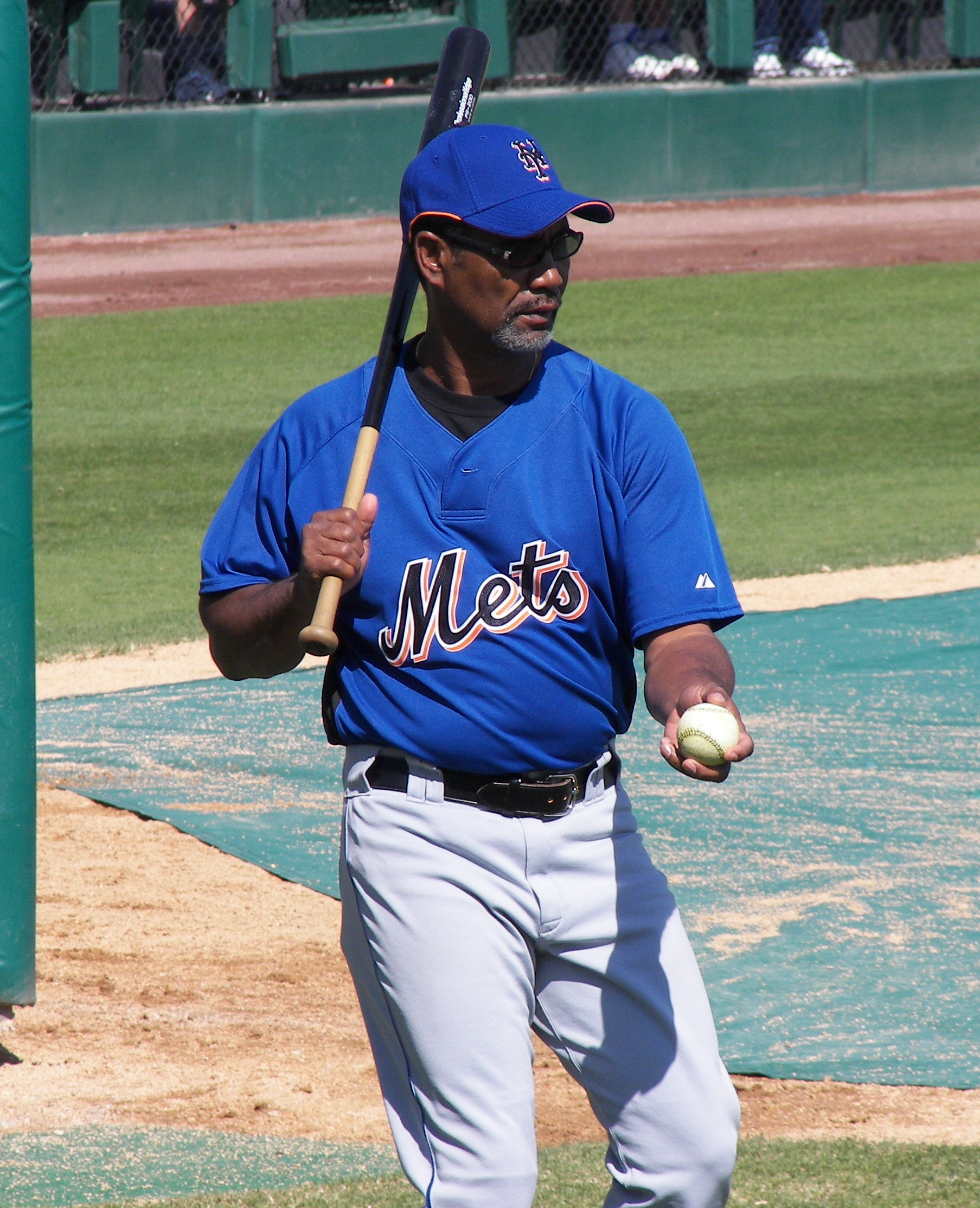
- Manuel as Mets coach in 2007
- Second baseman / Manager
- Born: December 23, 1953 (age 72); Hahira, Georgia, U.S.
- Batted: Switch Threw: Right

MLB debut
- September 18, 1975, for the Detroit Tigers

Last MLB appearance
- May 30, 1982, for the San Diego Padres

MLB statistics
- Batting average: .150
- Home runs: 3
- Runs batted in: 13
- Managerial record: 704–684
- Winning %: .507
- Stats at Baseball Reference
- Managerial record at Baseball Reference

Teams
- As player: Detroit Tigers (1975–1976); Montreal Expos (1980–1981); San Diego Padres (1982); As manager: Chicago White Sox (1998–2003); New York Mets (2008–2010); As coach: Montreal Expos (1991–1996); Florida Marlins (1997); New York Mets (2005–2008)

Career highlights and awards
- World Series champion (1997); AL Manager of the Year (2000)

Jerry Lorenzo Manuel Sr. (born December 23, 1953), nicknamed "the Sage", is an American former professional baseball second baseman, coach, and manager. As a Major League Baseball player, he played for the Detroit Tigers, Montreal Expos, and San Diego Padres. As manager, he led New York Mets and Chicago White Sox, for which he was named 2000 AL Manager of the Year. He further coached for the Expos, Mets, and Florida Marlins, with whom he won the 1997 World Series.

He currently works as an analyst for MLB Network.

== Playing career ==
Manuel played sparingly in the major leagues from 1975 to 1982, mostly as a second baseman. He accumulated only 127 at bats and a .150 batting average with three home runs and 13 RBIs in 96 games. Although his major league playing career was brief, Manuel was the starting second baseman for the Montreal Expos in their only postseason series victory in 1981. He was 1-for-14 (.071) in the series and was replaced by Rodney Scott in the NLCS.

Other than Montreal, Manuel played for the Detroit Tigers and the San Diego Padres and ultimately retired in 1984.

In 1972, Manuel and Mike Ondina became the first pair of high school teammates to be drafted in the first round of a Major League draft. Both attended Cordova High School in Rancho Cordova, California. Manuel played just under 100 games.

== Coaching and managerial career ==
Manuel held a variety of coaching positions over the next six years. He was originally hired by the Chicago White Sox in 1985 to scout Northern California. He left the White Sox the following year to join the Montreal Expos organization, a team with which he would remain associated for the next 11 years. In 1986, Manuel joined the Expos' Triple-A affiliate, the Indianapolis Indians of the American Association, as a player/coach. Manuel spent the next three years as the Expos' roving infield instructor (1987) and their minor league field coordinator (1988–89). In 1990, Manuel became a manager for the first time as he was named the manager of the Southern League's Jacksonville Expos, the Expos' Double-A affiliate. He led the team to an 84–60 record and was named the league's manager of the year.

=== 1991–2003 ===
Following a successful season at Double-A, Manuel was elevated to Triple-A to manage the Indianapolis Indians for the 1991 season. Midway through the campaign, he was brought up to Montreal to serve as the third base coach for the Expos, ending a minor league managing career in which Manuel compiled a 112–82 record. He remained the Expos' third base coach through the 1996 season. In 1997, he moved on to the Florida Marlins, where he became a bench coach under Jim Leyland. The team went on to win the 1997 World Series. Days after the World Series victory, Manuel's father, Lorenzo Manuel, died.

Over one month later, in December, Manuel signed a multi-year deal to manage the Chicago White Sox. Over the next six seasons, he amassed 500 wins and led the Sox to 95 in 2000 alone. He was described by Sports Illustrated as managing by good communication and a gut feeling, noting a story in which Manuel elected to use Jeff Abbott to pinch-hit for a .283 hitter in a close game because of what he saw in batting practice despite him hitting .192 for the year at that point and hitting 3-for-26 lifetime as a pinch-hitter; Manuel stated the following about batting practice: "I'm studying the hitters to see who is swinging the bat well. That's why I watch so closely. Abbott was swinging the bat well that day, and I felt very good about him. If you have a feel, you've got to go with it." The gambit worked for a hit. In the 2000 season, Manuel guided the White Sox to a first-place finish in the American League's Central Division and was named the American League's Manager of the Year. They had the best record in all of the American League but lost in the ALDS. Despite a trade for Bartolo Colon, the Sox got off to a slow start in May 2003, leading to rumblings of firing Manuel if they missed the playoffs; hitting coach Gary Ward was fired in that same month, which saw them drop below .500. They managed to get to first place as late as September 14 but were then swept by the Minnesota Twins on their way to losing 7 of the last 13 games. One day after the season ended, on September 29, Manuel was fired. He was replaced as White Sox manager by Ozzie Guillén.

His 2003 Topps baseball card reads:

"Jerry has a philosophical air about him that makes him a sage influence and respected leader on his teams. After six seasons directing the White Sox fortunes, he's risen to fourth on the franchise's managerial wins list. Formerly, he was a pro player for 15 years and 12-year coach/Minor League manager. Manuel and Ken Williams form the first African-American GM/manager tandem in MLB history."

=== New York Mets (2005–2010) ===
==== Coach ====
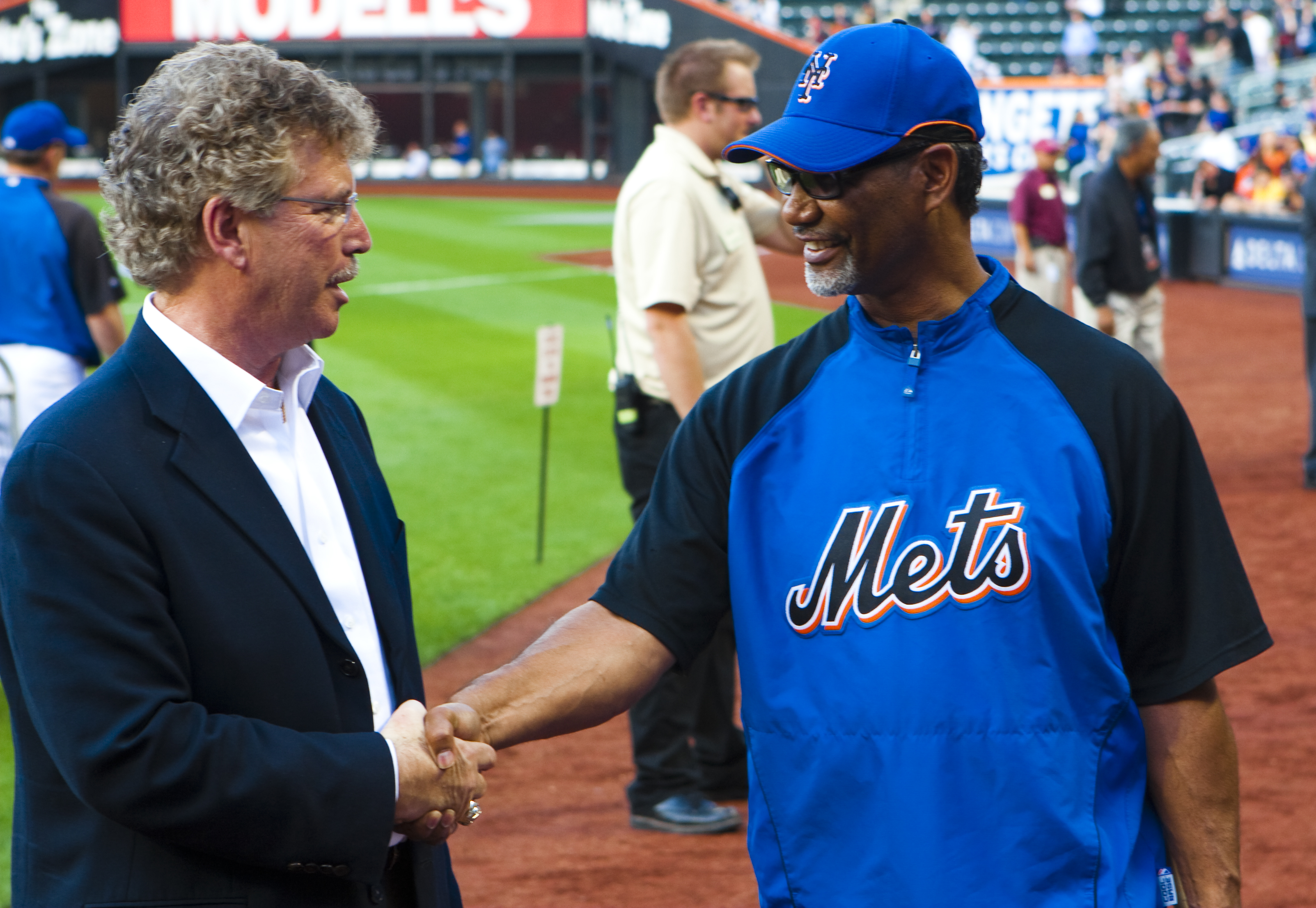
Manuel with Dewayne Staats on June 19, 2009.

After departing the White Sox, Manuel joined the New York Mets organization in 2005 as the first base and outfield coach under new manager Willie Randolph. Manuel became Randolph's bench coach in 2006, a position he remained in until 2008.

==== Manager ====
On June 17, 2008, Willie Randolph, pitching coach Rick Peterson, and first base coach Tom Nieto were fired by the Mets. Omar Minaya announced Manuel as the interim manager, while Ken Oberkfell, Dan Warthen, and Luis Aguayo were brought up from the New Orleans Zephyrs (the then-Mets' Triple-A affiliate) to fill the remaining coaching vacancies.

In 2008, the Mets were unable to hold a division lead, and ultimately the Philadelphia Phillies clinched the division on September 27. The Mets were then eliminated from the National League Wild Card berth the following day when the team lost to the Florida Marlins 4–2 in the final game at Shea Stadium.

On October 3, 2008, Manuel agreed to a two-year deal to remain the Mets manager. The deal included a club option for a third year.

On October 4, 2010, the Mets announced that both Manuel and general manager Omar Minaya would not return for the 2011 season.

== Managerial record ==
As of October 12, 2021

Team	Year	Regular season					Postseason			
Team	Year	Games	Won	Lost	Win %	Finish	Won	Lost	Win %	Result
CWS	1998	162	80	82	.494	2nd in AL Central	–	–	–	–
CWS	1999	161	75	86	.466	2nd in AL Central	–	–	–	–
CWS	2000	162	95	67	.586	1st in AL Central	0	3	.000	Lost ALDS (SEA)
CWS	2001	162	83	79	.512	3rd in AL Central	–	–	–	–
CWS	2002	162	81	81	.500	2nd in AL Central	–	–	–	–
CWS	2003	162	86	76	.531	2nd in AL Central	–	–	–	–
CWS total		971	500	471	.515		0	3	.000	
NYM	2008	93	55	38	.591	2nd in NL East	–	–	–	–
NYM	2009	162	70	92	.432	4th in NL East	–	–	–	–
NYM	2010	162	79	83	.488	4th in NL East	–	–	–	–
NYM total		417	204	213	.489		0	0	–	
Total		1388	704	684	.507		0	3	.000	

== Post-MLB career ==
After leaving Major League Baseball, Manuel went back to his home in the Sacramento area and started the Jerry Manuel Foundation to "Educate African American young men with charter school standards and train them in the fundamentals of baseball."

On January 16, 2014, it was announced that Manuel would be brought on as the Director of Baseball Operations at William Jessup University in Rocklin, California.

Manuel served as a bench coach for Team USA during the 2023 World Baseball Classic.

== Personal life ==
Manuel is married and has four children, including fashion designer Jerry Lorenzo, founder of the streetwear label Fear of God.

Sporting positions
Preceded by Alan Bannister	Jacksonville Expos Manager; 1990	Succeeded by last manager
Preceded by Tim Johnson	Indianapolis Indians Manager; 1991	Succeeded by Pat Kelly
Preceded by Tom Runnells	Montreal Expos Third Base Coach; 1991–1996	Succeeded by Pete Mackanin
Preceded by	Florida Marlins Bench Coach; 1997	Succeeded by
Preceded by Gary Pettis	New York Mets First Base Coach; 2005	Succeeded by Sandy Alomar Sr.
Preceded by Sandy Alomar Sr.	New York Mets Bench Coach; 2006–2008	Succeeded by Sandy Alomar Sr.
