= Robert Ramsay (baseball) =

American baseball player (1973-2016)

- Pitcher
- Born: December 3, 1973; Vancouver, Washington, U.S.
- Died: August 4, 2016 (aged 42); Moscow, Idaho, U.S.
- Batted: Left Threw: Left

MLB debut
- August 27, 1999, for the Seattle Mariners

Last MLB appearance
- September 30, 2000, for the Seattle Mariners

MLB statistics
- Win–loss record: 1–3
- Earned run average: 4.19
- Strikeouts: 43
- Stats at Baseball Reference

Teams
- Seattle Mariners (1999–2000)

Robert Arthur Ramsay (December 3, 1973 – August 4, 2016) was an American Major League Baseball pitcher. He pitched parts of the 1999 and 2000 seasons for the Seattle Mariners, then battled brain cancer for nearly 15 years before his death.

== Early years ==
Born and raised in Vancouver, Washington, Ramsay graduated from its Mountain View High School in 1992. He then attended Washington State University in Pullman, where he played college baseball for the Cougars for four seasons, through 1996.

During his junior year in 1995, WSU won the Pac-10 northern division, and Ramsay was the starter in the first game of the championship series against southern division winner USC at Los Angeles.

== Professional career ==
Following his senior season at Washington State, Ramsay was selected by the Boston Red Sox in the seventh round of the 1996 draft. The Red Sox traded him to the Mariners for Butch Huskey on July 26, 1999. After the 2000 season with Seattle, Ramsay spent 2001 at Triple-A Tacoma, then was diagnosed with brain cancer (glioblastoma multiforme) in early 2002. After surgeries, chemotherapy, and radiation treatment, he attempted a comeback in 2003 with the San Diego Padres organization, but it ended his baseball career.

== Personal life and death ==
Ramsay lived in Pullman in the off-season during his pro career, and spent some of his retirement coaching and teaching in Coeur d'Alene, Idaho, his wife Samantha's hometown.

The family moved back down to the Palouse at Moscow, where Samantha, a former Penn State and WSU volleyball player (setter), became an assistant professor of nutrition at the University of Idaho in 2010. While she completed her doctorate in education at UI, Ramsay earned a master's degree.

Ramsay died at age 42 in Moscow in 2016 after suffering a seizure, a complication related to previously diagnosed brain cancer. He had survived over 14½ years since the initial diagnosis. His widow died in a storm after being struck by lightning on the Matterhorn in 2017.
