= 2000 Seattle Mariners season =

2000 Seattle Mariners
- American League Wild Card winners
- League: American League
- Division: West
- Ballpark: Safeco Field
- City: Seattle, Washington
- Record: 91–71 (.562)
- Divisional place: 2nd
- Owner: Hiroshi Yamauchi (represented by Howard Lincoln)
- General manager: Pat Gillick
- Manager: Lou Piniella
- Television: KIRO-TV 7 FSN Northwest
- Radio: KIRO 710 AM (Dave Niehaus, Rick Rizzs, Ron Fairly, Dave Valle, Dave Henderson)

The Seattle Mariners' 2000 season was the franchise's 24th, and ended in the American League Championship Series, falling to the New York Yankees in six games.

The regular season ended with the Mariners finishing second in the American League West but earning the franchise's first wild card berth, with a 91–71 (.562) record. In the playoffs, they swept the Chicago White Sox in the American League Division Series but were defeated by the Yankees in the next round.

The Mariners traded future Hall of Famer Ken Griffey Jr. before the start of the season, which was also Alex Rodriguez's final season with Seattle.

== Offseason ==
- November 17, 1999: Rich Butler signed as a free agent with the Mariners.
- December 6: Jay Buhner re-signed with the Mariners on a one-year contract. Jamie Moyer signed a contract extension for the 2002 season.
- December 15: John Olerud signed a three year, $20 million contract with the Mariners.
- December 18: Kazuhiro Sasaki signed a two year, $9.5 million contract with the Mariners.
- December 21: Mark McLemore and Stan Javier signed as free agents with the Mariners.
- January 10, 2000: Aaron Sele signed a two-year, $15 million contract with the Mariners, after a physical exam scuttled a four-year contract with the Baltimore Orioles.
- January 14: Brian Lesher signed as a free agent with the Mariners.
- January 19: Joe Oliver signed as a free agent with the Mariners.
- February 10: Ken Griffey Jr. was traded by the Mariners to the Cincinnati Reds for Mike Cameron, Brett Tomko, Antonio Pérez, and Jake Meyer.

== Regular season ==
=== Season standings ===
AL West
Team	W	L	Pct.	GB	Home	Road
Oakland Athletics	91	70	.565	—	47‍–‍34	44‍–‍36
Seattle Mariners	91	71	.562	½	47‍–‍34	44‍–‍37
Anaheim Angels	82	80	.506	9½	46‍–‍35	36‍–‍45
Texas Rangers	71	91	.438	20½	42‍–‍39	29‍–‍52

=== Record vs. opponents ===
2000 American League record Source: MLB Standings Grid – 2000
Team	ANA	BAL	BOS	CWS	CLE	DET	KC	MIN	NYY	OAK	SEA	TB	TEX	TOR	NL
Anaheim	—	7–5	5–4	4–6	3–6	5–5	6–6	7–3	5–5	5–8	5–8	6–6	7–5	5–7	12–6
Baltimore	5–7	—	5–7	4–6	5–4	6–4	3–7	6–3	5–7	4–8	3–7	8–5	6–6	7–6	7–11
Boston	4–5	7–5	—	7–5	6–6	7–5	4–6	8–2	6–7	5–5	5–5	6–6	7–3	4–8	9–9
Chicago	6–4	6–4	5–7	—	8–5	9–3	5–7	7–5	8–4	6–3	7–5	6–4	5–5	5–5	12–6
Cleveland	6–3	4–5	6–6	5–8	—	6–7	5–7	5–8	5–5	6–6	7–2	8–2	6–4	8–4	13–5
Detroit	5–5	4–6	5–7	3–9	7–6	—	5–7	7–6	8–4	6–4	7–2	4–5	5–5	3–9	10–8
Kansas City	6–6	7–3	6–4	7–5	7–5	7–5	—	7–5	2–8	4–8	4–8	5–5	3–7	4–6	8–10
Minnesota	3–7	3–6	2–8	5–7	8–5	6–7	5–7	—	5–5	5–7	3–9	4–6	8–4	5–4	7–11
New York	5–5	7–5	7–6	4–8	5–5	4–8	8–2	5–5	—	6–3	4–6	6–6	10–2	5–7	11–6
Oakland	8–5	8–4	5–5	3–6	6–6	4–6	8–4	7–5	3–6	—	9–4	7–2	5–7	7–3	11–7
Seattle	8–5	7–3	5–5	5–7	2–7	2–7	8–4	9–3	6–4	4–9	—	9–3	7–5	8–2	11–7
Tampa Bay	6–6	5–8	6–6	4–6	2–8	5–4	5–5	6–4	6–6	2–7	3–9	—	5–7	5–7	9–9
Texas	5–7	6–6	3–7	5–5	4–6	5–5	7–3	4–8	2–10	7–5	5–7	7–5	—	4–6	7–11
Toronto	7–5	6–7	8–4	5–5	4–8	9–3	6–4	4–5	7–5	3–7	2–8	7–5	6–4	—	9–9

=== Season summary ===
==== Awards and honors ====
Closer Kazuhiro Sasaki won the American League (AL) Rookie of the Year Award. His 37 saves set a new franchise single-season record, surpassing Mike Schooler's 33 saves in 1989.

Designated hitter Edgar Martinez won the AL Player of the Month Award for May after batting .441 with an .814 slugging percentage. He led the AL with 145 runs batted in and won the Edgar Martínez Award.

Shortstop Alex Rodriguez won the Baseball America Major League Player of the Year Award and a Silver Slugger Award. First baseman John Olerud won a Gold Glove Award.

Rodriguez, Martínez, and Sele were selected to the All-Star Game.

==== Notable transactions ====
- May 19, 2000: Rickey Henderson signed as a free agent with the Seattle Mariners.
- July 2: José López signed as an amateur free agent with the Mariners.
- July 9: Wladimir Balentien signed as an amateur free agent with the Mariners.
- July 31: The Mariners traded John Mabry and Tom Davey to the San Diego Padres for Al Martin.
- August 8: The Mariners traded two players to be named later to the Montreal Expos for Chris Widger. The Mariners sent Sean Spencer on August 10 and Terrmel Sledge on September 28 to the Expos to complete the trade.
- August 14: Shin-Soo Choo signed as an amateur free agent.

== 2000 roster ==
2000 Seattle Mariners
Roster
Pitchers: 48 Paul Abbott; 34 Freddy García; 54 John Halama; 58 Kevin Hodges; 55 Gil Meche; 49 José Mesa; 50 Jamie Moyer; 36 José Paniagua; 38 Joel Piñeiro; 39 Robert Ramsay; 53 Arthur Rhodes; 33 Frankie Rodriguez; 22 Kazuhiro Sasaki; 30 Aaron Sele; 40 Brett Tomko	Catchers: 17 Tom Lampkin; 39 Robert Machado; 9 Joe Oliver; 16 Chris Widger; 6 Dan Wilson; Infielders: 25 David Bell; 8 Carlos Guillén; 20 Carlos Hernández; 31 Brian Lesher; 47 John Mabry; 11 Edgar Martínez; 4 Mark McLemore; 5 John Olerud; 3 Alex Rodriguez	Outfielders: 19 Jay Buhner; 44 Mike Cameron; 1 Charles Gipson; 35 Rickey Henderson; 23 Raúl Ibañez; 28 Stan Javier; 18 Al Martin; 13 Anthony Sanders	Manager: 14 Lou Piniella; Coaches: 10 Larry Bowa; 7 John McLaren; 12 John Moses; 29 Gerald Perry; 35,32 Bryan Price; 15 Matt Sinatro

=== Player stats ===
==== Batting ====
= Indicates team leader

= Indicates league leader

===== Starters by position =====
Note: Pos = Position; G = Games played; AB = At bats; R = Runs; H = Hits; HR = Home runs; RBI = Runs batted in; Avg. = Batting average; SB = Stolen bases

Pos	Player	G	AB	R	H	HR	RBI	Avg.	SB
C	Dan Wilson	90	268	31	63	5	27	.235	1
1B	John Olerud	159	565	84	161	14	103	.285	0
2B	Mark McLemore	130	481	72	118	3	46	.245	30
3B	David Bell	133	454	57	112	11	47	.247	2
SS	Alex Rodriguez	148	554	134	175	41	132	.316	15
LF	Rickey Henderson	92	324	58	77	4	30	.238	31
CF	Mike Cameron	155	543	96	145	19	78	.267	24
RF	Jay Buhner	112	364	50	92	26	82	.253	0
DH	Edgar Martínez	153	556	100	180	37	145	.324	3

===== Other batters =====
Note: G = Games played; AB = At bats; R = Runs; H = Hits; HR = Home runs; RBI = Runs batted in; Avg. = Batting average; SB = Stolen bases

Player	G	AB	R	H	HR	RBI	Avg.	SB
Charles Gipson	59	29	7	9	0	3	.310	2
Carlos Guillén	90	288	45	74	7	42	.257	1
Carlos Hernández	2	1	0	0	0	0	.000	0
Raúl Ibañez	92	140	21	32	2	15	.229	2
Stan Javier	105	342	61	94	5	40	.275	4
Tom Lampkin	36	103	15	26	7	23	.252	0
Brian Lesher	5	5	1	4	0	3	.800	1
John Mabry	47	103	18	25	1	7	.243	0
Robert Machado	8	14	2	3	1	1	.214	0
Al Martin	42	134	19	31	4	9	.231	4
Joe Oliver	69	200	33	53	10	35	.265	2
Anthony Sanders	1	1	1	1	0	0	1.000	0
Chris Widger	10	11	1	1	1	1	.091	1

==== Pitching ====
===== Starting pitchers =====
Note: G = Games pitched; IP = Innings pitched; W = Wins; L = Losses; ERA = Earned run average; SO = Strikeouts

Player	G	IP	W	L	ERA	SO
Aaron Sele	34	211.2	17	10	4.51	137
Paul Abbott	35	179.0	9	7	4.22	100
John Halama	30	166.2	14	9	5.08	87
Jamie Moyer	26	154.0	13	10	5.49	98
Freddy García	21	124.1	9	5	3.91	79
Gil Meche	15	85.2	4	4	3.78	60

===== Other pitchers =====
Note: G = Games pitched; IP = Innings pitched; W = Wins; L = Losses; ERA = Earned run average; SO = Strikeouts

Player	G	IP	W	L	ERA	SO
Brett Tomko	32	92.1	7	5	4.68	59
Joel Piñeiro	8	19.1	1	0	5.59	10

===== Relief pitchers =====
Note: G = Games pitched; W = Wins; L = Losses; SV = Saves; ERA = Earned run average; SO = Strikeouts

Player	G	W	L	SV	ERA	SO
Kazuhiro Sasaki	63	2	5	37	3.16	78
Arthur Rhodes	72	5	8	0	4.28	77
José Paniagua	69	3	0	5	3.47	71
José Mesa	66	4	6	1	5.36	84
Robert Ramsay	37	1	1	0	3.40	32
Frank Rodriguez	23	2	1	0	6.27	19
Kevin Hodges	13	0	0	0	5.19	7
John Mabry	1	0	0	0	27.00	0

== Postseason ==
=== ALDS ===
==== Seattle Mariners vs. Chicago White Sox ====
Seattle wins the series, 3–0

Game	Home	Score	Visitor	Score	Date	Series
1	Chicago	4	Seattle	7	October 3	1–0 (SEA)
2	Chicago	2	Seattle	5	October 4	2–0 (SEA)
3	Seattle	2	Chicago	1	October 6	3–0 (SEA)

=== ALCS ===
==== Seattle Mariners vs. New York Yankees ====
Yankees win the Series, 4–2

Game	Score	Date	Location	Attendance
1	Seattle – 2, New York – 0	October 10	Yankee Stadium	54,481
2	Seattle – 1, New York – 7	October 11	Yankee Stadium	55,317
3	New York – 8, Seattle – 2	October 13	Safeco Field	47,827
4	New York – 5, Seattle – 0	October 14	Safeco Field	47,803
5	New York – 2, Seattle – 6	October 15	Safeco Field	47,802
6	Seattle – 7, New York – 9	October 17	Yankee Stadium	56,598

== Farm system ==
Level	Team	League	Manager
AAA	Tacoma Rainiers	Pacific Coast League	Dave Myers
AA	New Haven Ravens	Eastern League	Dan Rohn
A	Lancaster JetHawks	California League	Mark Parent
A	Wisconsin Timber Rattlers	Midwest League	Gary Thurman
A-Short Season	Everett AquaSox	Northwest League	Terry Pollreisz
Rookie	AZL Mariners	Arizona League	Omer Muñoz

League champions: New Haven, AZL Mariners

== MLB draft ==
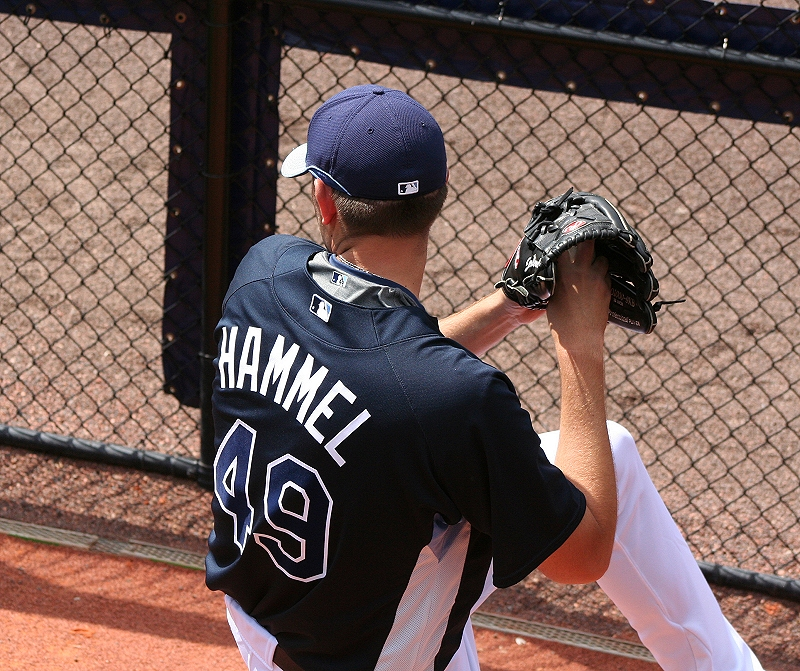
2000 Seattle Mariners draft picks
Jason Hammel (pictured) was the Mariners 23rd round pick in 2000.
Information
**Owner**	Nintendo of America
**General Manager(s)**	Pat Gillick
**Manager(s)**	Lou Piniella
**First pick**	Sam Hays
**Draft positions**	16th
**Number of selections**	47
Links
**Results**	Baseball Reference
**Official Site**	The Official Site of the Seattle Mariners
**Years**	1999 • 2000 • 2001

The following is a list of 2000 Seattle Mariners draft picks. The Mariners took part in the June regular draft, also known as the Rule 4 draft. The Mariners made 47 selections in the 2000 draft, the first being pitcher Sam Hays in the fourth round. In all, the Mariners selected 21 pitchers, 13 outfielders, 6 catchers, 5 shortstops, and 2 third basemen.

=== Draft ===
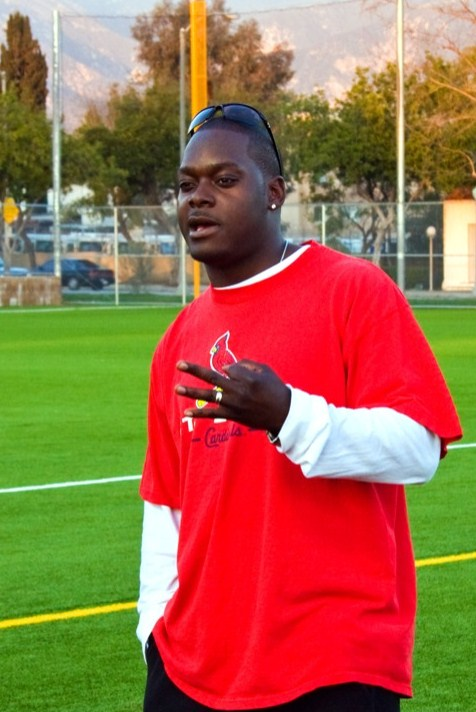
Jamal Strong was selected by the Mariners in the sixth round of the 2000 draft.

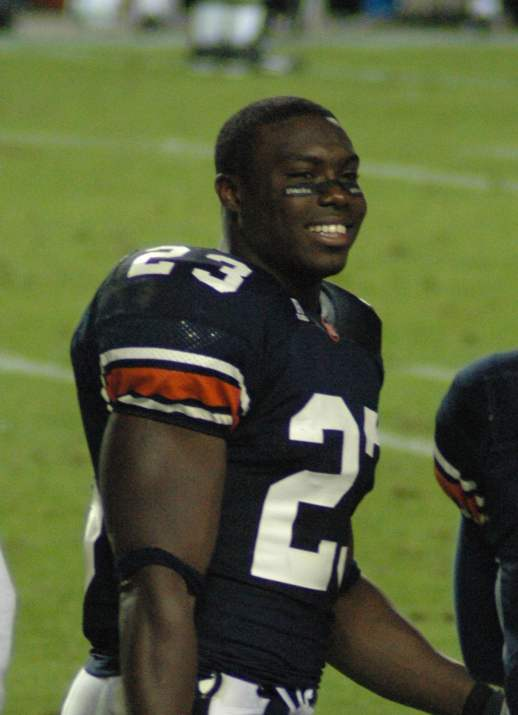
Eagles and Dolphins running back Ronnie Brown was the 42nd round pick of the Mariners.

=== Key ===
Round (Pick)	Indicates the round and pick the player was drafted
Position	Indicates the secondary/collegiate position at which the player was drafted, rather than the professional position the player may have gone on to play
**Bold**	Indicates the player signed with the Mariners
Italics	Indicates the player did not sign with the Mariners
	Indicates the player made an appearance in Major League Baseball

=== Table ===
Round (Pick)	Name	Position	School	Source
4 (116)	**Sam Hays**	Left-handed pitcher	Waco High School	
5 (146)	**Derrick Van Dusen**	Left-handed pitcher	Riverside City College	
6 (176)	**Jamal Strong**	Outfielder	University of Nebraska–Lincoln	
7 (206)	**Jaime Bubela**	Outfielder	Baylor University	
8 (236)	**Rett Johnson**	Right-handed pitcher	Coastal Carolina University	
9 (266)	Charlie Manning	Left-handed pitcher	University of Tampa	
10 (296)	**Ryan Ketchner**	Left-handed pitcher	John I. Leonard High School	
11 (326)	**Blake Bone**	Third baseman	University of Alabama in Huntsville	
12 (356)	**Erick Swanson**	Left-handed pitcher	Oakland University	
13 (386)	**Skip Wiley**	Right-handed pitcher	Chaminade–Madonna College Preparatory School	
14 (416)	**Manny Crespo**	Outfielder	University of Miami	
15 (446)	**Jake Daubert**	Third baseman	Rutgers University	
16 (476)	**Jared Jones**	Outfielder	Florida State University	
17 (506)	**Steven Moore**	Outfielder	Dominguez High School	
18 (536)	Jonathan Douillard	Catcher	Harrison High School	
19 (566)	**Tanner Watson**	Right-handed pitcher	Arnprior District High School	
20 (596)	Miguel Martinez	Left-handed pitcher	Maria Auxiliadora High School	
21 (626)	Robbie Van	Left-handed pitcher	Silverado High School	
22 (656)	**Larry Brown**	Outfielder	College of the Canyons	
23 (686)	Jason Hammel	Right-handed pitcher	South Kitsap High School	
24 (716)	**William Corbin**	Catcher	Jefferson High School	
25 (746)	Kyle Pawelczyk	Left-handed pitcher	Elkins High School	
26 (776)	Jose Cruz	Outfielder	Florida Air Academy	
27 (806)	**Theo Heflin**	Left-handed pitcher	Hutchinson Community College	
28 (836)	**Thomas Williams**	Outfielder	McCallum High School	
29 (866)	Brandon Espinosa	Right-handed pitcher	Mater Dei High School	
30 (896)	**Frederick Ambres**	Right-handed pitcher	Ranger College	
31 (926)	**Jason Looper**	Shortstop	Sentinel High School	
32 (956)	**Phil Cullen**	Right-handed pitcher	University of Utah	
33 (986)	Ben Hudson	Catcher	Truett-McConnell College	
34 (1016)	**Chris Way**	Right-handed pitcher	Groves High School	
35 (1046)	**Chris Way**	Right-handed pitcher	Ridgewood High School	
36 (1076)	**Ben Williams**	Shortstop	Calloway High School	
37 (1106)	Billy Sadler	Right-handed pitcher	Pensacola Catholic High School	
38 (1136)	Colby Summer	Shortstop	Mountain View High School	
39 (1166)	John Nelson	Shortstop	University of Kansas	
40 (1195)	Justin Ottman	Left-handed pitcher	North Rockland High School	
41 (1224)	**Ryan Welborn**	Outfielder	Yukon High School	
42 (1253)	**Ronnie Brown**	Outfielder	Cartersville High School	
43 (1281)	**Craig Moreland**	Outfielder	Trousdale County High School	
44 (1308)	**Dennis Cervenka**	Left-handed pitcher	McLennan Community College	
45 (1334)	**Alex Cadena**	Catcher	Galveston College	
46 (1358)	**Derrell Smith**	Shortstop	Palm Beach Lakes Community High School	
47 (1382)	**Chris Collins**	Catcher	South Mountain Community College	
48 (1402)	Philip Perry	Outfielder	Lakewood High School (California)	
49 (1422)	**Isaac Johnson**	Outfielder	Wilcox High School	
50 (1442)	**Matt Armstrong**	Catcher	Eustis High School	
