= Scarborough Green =

American baseball player (born 1974)

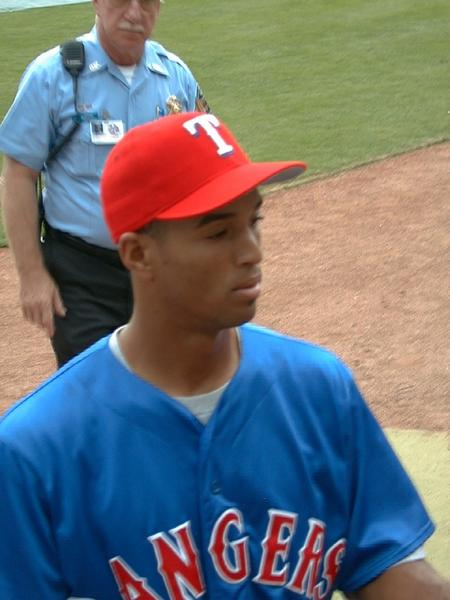
- Before a Texas Rangers game on April 11, 1999
- Outfielder
- Born: June 9, 1974 (age 51); Creve Coeur, Missouri, U.S.
- Batted: Right Threw: Right

MLB debut
- August 2, 1997, for the St. Louis Cardinals

Last MLB appearance
- October 1, 2000, for the Texas Rangers

MLB statistics
- Batting average: .214
- Hits: 36
- Runs batted in: 10
- Stats at Baseball Reference

Teams
- St. Louis Cardinals (1997); Texas Rangers (1999–2000)

Bertrum Scarborough Green (born June 9, 1974) is an American former Major League Baseball outfielder.

Drafted by the St. Louis Cardinals in the 10th round of the 1992 Major League Baseball draft, Green made his major league debut with the Cardinals on August 2, 1997. He later played for the Texas Rangers in 1999 and 2000.

Following his career in baseball, Green pursued a collegiate football career at NCAA Division II Harding University. Green transferred to Division III McMurry University in Abilene, Texas to play football. While serving as the team's punter, wide receiver, and in other positions, Green participated in track and field for McMurry. Green was a member of the 2007 National Champion McMurry University 4x100 relay team, and he added to his All-American titles by running in the 4x400 relay.
