= B. J. Waszgis =

American baseball player (born 1970)

- Catcher
- Born: August 24, 1970 (age 54); Omaha, Nebraska, U.S.
- Batted: Right Threw: Right

MLB debut
- July 29, 2000, for the Texas Rangers

Last MLB appearance
- October 1, 2000, for the Texas Rangers

MLB statistics
- Batting average: .222
- Home runs: 0
- Runs batted in: 4
- Stats at Baseball Reference

Teams
- Texas Rangers (2000)

Robert Michael Waszgis (born August 24, 1970) is an American former professional baseball catcher. Waszgis played in Major League Baseball (MLB) for the Texas Rangers in 2000. He batted and threw right-handed.

Waszgis was selected by the Philadelphia Phillies in the 21st round of the 1990 MLB draft, but he did not sign. The Baltimore Orioles selected him the 10th round of the 1991 MLB draft, and he signed with the team. He played professionally from 1991 through 2001, and a final season in 2003. He played 24 major-league games during the 2000 season, after being called up to serve as backup catcher to Bill Haselman, due to starter Iván Rodríguez sustaining a season-ending thumb injury.
