= Marcus Jones (baseball) =

American baseball player (born 1975)

- Pitcher
- Born: March 29, 1975 (age 51); Bellflower, California
- Batted: Right Threw: Right

MLB debut
- July 17, 2000, for the Oakland Athletics

Last MLB appearance
- July 17, 2000, for the Oakland Athletics

MLB statistics
- Win–loss record: 0–0
- Earned run average: 15.43
- Strikeouts: 1
- Stats at Baseball Reference

Teams
- Oakland Athletics (2000)

Marcus Ray Jones (born March 29, 1975) is an American former professional baseball pitcher. He played in Major League Baseball (MLB) for the Oakland Athletics during the 2000 season.
