= Craig Wilson (baseball, born 1970) =

American baseball player (born 1970)

- Infielder
- Born: September 3, 1970 (age 55); Chicago, Illinois, U.S.
- Batted: Right Threw: Right

MLB debut
- September 5, 1998, for the Chicago White Sox

Last MLB appearance
- October 1, 2000, for the Chicago White Sox

MLB statistics
- Batting average: .272
- Home runs: 7
- Runs batted in: 40
- Stats at Baseball Reference

Teams
- Chicago White Sox (1998–2000)
Medals
Men's baseball
Representing United States
Pan American Games
Bronze medal – third place	1991 Havana	Team

Craig Franklin Wilson (born September 3, 1970) is an American former professional baseball player. He played all or part of three seasons in Major League Baseball (MLB), primarily as an infielder.

== Career ==
Wilson played collegiately at Kansas State University. He played during three seasons at the MLB for the Chicago White Sox. He was drafted by the White Sox in the 13th round of the 1992 MLB draft. Wilson played his first professional season with their Class-A South Bend White Sox in 1993, and his last with the New York Yankees' Double-A Trenton Thunder in 2004.
