= Kevin Hodges (baseball) =

American baseball player (born 1973)

- Pitcher
- Born: June 24, 1973 (age 53); Houston, Texas, U.S.
- Batted: Right Threw: Right

Professional debut
- MLB: April 24, 2000, for the Seattle Mariners
- NPB: August 1, 2001, for the Yakult Swallows
- KBO: April 4, 2004, for the Samsung Lions

Last appearance
- MLB: September 30, 2000, for the Seattle Mariners
- KBO: October 27, 2004, for the Samsung Lions
- NPB: August 28, 2005, for the Tohoku Rakuten Golden Eagles

MLB statistics
- Win–loss record: 0–0
- Earned run average: 5.19
- Strikeouts: 7

NPB statistics
- Win–loss record: 29–32
- Earned run average: 4.63
- Strikeouts: 252

KBO statistics
- Win–loss record: 9–10
- Earned run average: 4.24
- Strikeouts: 123
- Stats at Baseball Reference

Teams
- Seattle Mariners (2000); Yakult Swallows (2001–2003); Samsung Lions (2004); Tohoku Rakuten Golden Eagles (2005)

Kevin Jon Hodges (born June 24, 1973) is an American former Major League Baseball (MLB) and Nippon Professional Baseball (MLB), and Korea Baseball Organization (KBO) right handed pitcher.

The Kansas City Royals selected Hodges in the eighth round of the 1991 MLB draft. He had season-ending shoulder surgery in 1995. He reached minor league free agency in October 1997 and signed with the Houston Astros, who traded him to the Seattle Mariners for Matt Mieske in June 1999. He made his major league debut with the Mariners in April 2000, his only season in MLB. He was demoted in June before returning as a September call-up. He was ejected from a loss to the Royals after throwing two inside pitches to Mike Sweeney. He threw a sinker and slider with the Mariners. After the season, he worked as a starting pitcher in the Arizona Fall League.

Hodges signed with the Yakult Swallows in mid-2001 and contributed to the team's league championship as part of the starting rotation. He led the Central League with 17 wins in 2002 (tied with Koji Uehara) and was an All-Star, but left the team at the end of 2003 after pitching part of the season in the Japanese minors. He played with the Samsung Lions in the KBO in 2004 and returned to Japan to play for the Tohoku Rakuten Golden Eagles in 2005.

He returned to the United States in 2006 and played with the Bridgeport Bluefish in the independent Atlantic League.

== Personal life ==
Hodges' younger brother, Trey Hodges, also played in MLB, NPB, and the Atlantic League.

In 2012, the Lions hired Hodges as a scout in the U.S.
