= Kelly Wunsch =

American baseball player (born 1972)

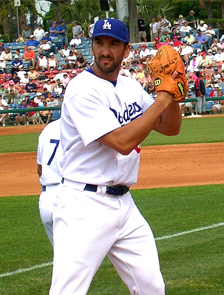
- Wunsch during spring training in 2006
- Pitcher
- Born: July 12, 1972 (age 53); Houston, Texas, U.S.
- Batted: Left Threw: Left

MLB debut
- April 3, 2000, for the Chicago White Sox

Last MLB appearance
- July 7, 2005, for the Los Angeles Dodgers

MLB statistics
- Win–loss record: 11–6
- Earned run average: 3.76
- Strikeouts: 145
- Stats at Baseball Reference

Teams
- Chicago White Sox (2000–2004); Los Angeles Dodgers (2005)

Kelly Douglas Wunsch (born July 12, 1972) is an American former Major League Baseball (MLB) pitcher who played for the Chicago White Sox and Los Angeles Dodgers from 2000 to 2005.

== Amateur career ==
A native of Houston, Texas, Wunsch attended Texas A&M University. In 1992, he played collegiate summer baseball with the Orleans Cardinals of the Cape Cod Baseball League and was named a league all-star.

== Professional career ==
Wunsch was drafted by the Milwaukee Brewers in the with 26th pick in the first round of the 1993 Major League Baseball draft. But despite his high draft slot, Wunsch was never able to reach the majors with the Brewers, struggling with inconsistency and injuries, including an elbow injury that kept him out for all of the 1996 season. During his struggles, Wunsch switched to a sidearm style delivery, which gave him better control, but decreased his velocity, forcing him to make the move to being a relief pitcher, instead of a power starter. After seven seasons within the Brewers organization, Wunsch was granted free agency. He eventually signed the Chicago White Sox as a non-roster invitee in spring training. Wunsch played well enough in spring training to make the major league roster, and he made his Major League Baseball debut with the White Sox on April 3, 2000, coming on in the 8th inning, and pitching an inning, not allowing a hit. Wunsch would go onto make a league-leading 83 appearances out of the bullpen for the White Sox in 2000, pitching to a 6–3 record with 2.93 ERA and 1 save in 61 1/3 innings. Wunsch received a two votes in AL Rookie of the Year voting, finishing in fifth place.

The next three seasons, Wunsch was used as a left-handed specialist out of the White Sox bullpen, appearing in 126 games, pitching to 3.00 ERA in 90 innings. Over this timespan, Wunsch struggled with repetitive shoulder and arm issues in his left pitching arm, which forced him to spend 202 total days on the injured list.

Wunsch began the 2004 season with the White Sox's Triple-A affiliate in Charlotte, while recovering from left shoulder inflammation. He would return from his injury and was called up to make 3 appearances in late May, pitching in 2 total innings with a 0.00 ERA. Wunsch would then be sent back down to Triple-A, because his role as a left-handed reliever had been supplanted by Dámaso Marte and Neal Cotts.

After being granted free agency in the 2004 offseason, Wunsch joining the Dodgers in 2005, Wunsch pitched quite well as a left-handed specialist, with 4.56 ERA in 45 appearances, but missed the latter half of the season due to a torn peroneal tendon in his right ankle.

He signed with the Houston Astros in February 2007 to attempt a comeback, but was released on March 28.
