= Jesús Peña =

Dominican baseball player (born 1975)

- Pitcher
- Born: March 8, 1975 (age 51); Santo Domingo, Dominican Republic
- Batted: Left Threw: Left

MLB debut
- August 7, 1999, for the Chicago White Sox

Last MLB appearance
- October 1, 2000, for the Boston Red Sox

MLB statistics
- Win–loss record: 2–1
- Earned run average: 5.21
- Strikeouts: 40

CPBL statistics
- Win–loss record: 2–1
- Earned run average: 2.29
- Strikeouts: 15
- Stats at Baseball Reference

Teams
- Chicago White Sox (1999–2000); Boston Red Sox (2000); Macoto Gida (2003)

Jesús Peña (born March 8, 1975) is a Dominican former relief pitcher in Major League Baseball who played from 1999 through 2000 for the Chicago White Sox (1999–2000) and Boston Red Sox (2000). Listed at 6' 0", 170 lb., he batted and threw left-handed.

A left-handed specialist, Peña posted a 2–1 record with a 5.21 ERA and one save in 48 appearances, giving up 34 runs (27 earned) on 49 hits and 42 walks while striking out 40 in 46 2/3 innings of work.

Peña also played in the Pirates, White Sox, Red Sox, Rangers and Rockies minor league systems from 1995 to 2003. He went 22–41 with a 4.45 ERA and 39 saves in 300 games, including 229 walks, 448 strikeouts, and 481.0 innings pitched.
