= John Snyder (baseball) =

American baseball player (born 1974)

- Pitcher
- Born: August 16, 1974 (age 50); Southfield, Michigan, U.S.
- Batted: Right Threw: Right

MLB debut
- June 30, 1998, for the Chicago White Sox

Last MLB appearance
- September 23, 2000, for the Milwaukee Brewers

MLB statistics
- Win–loss record: 19–24
- Earned run average: 6.01
- Strikeouts: 188
- Stats at Baseball Reference

Teams
- Chicago White Sox (1998–1999); Milwaukee Brewers (2000)

John Snyder (born August 16, 1974) is an American former professional baseball pitcher. He played for the Chicago White Sox and Milwaukee Brewers of Major League Baseball (MLB).
