= WellSpan Park =

Baseball park in York, Pennsylvania, USA

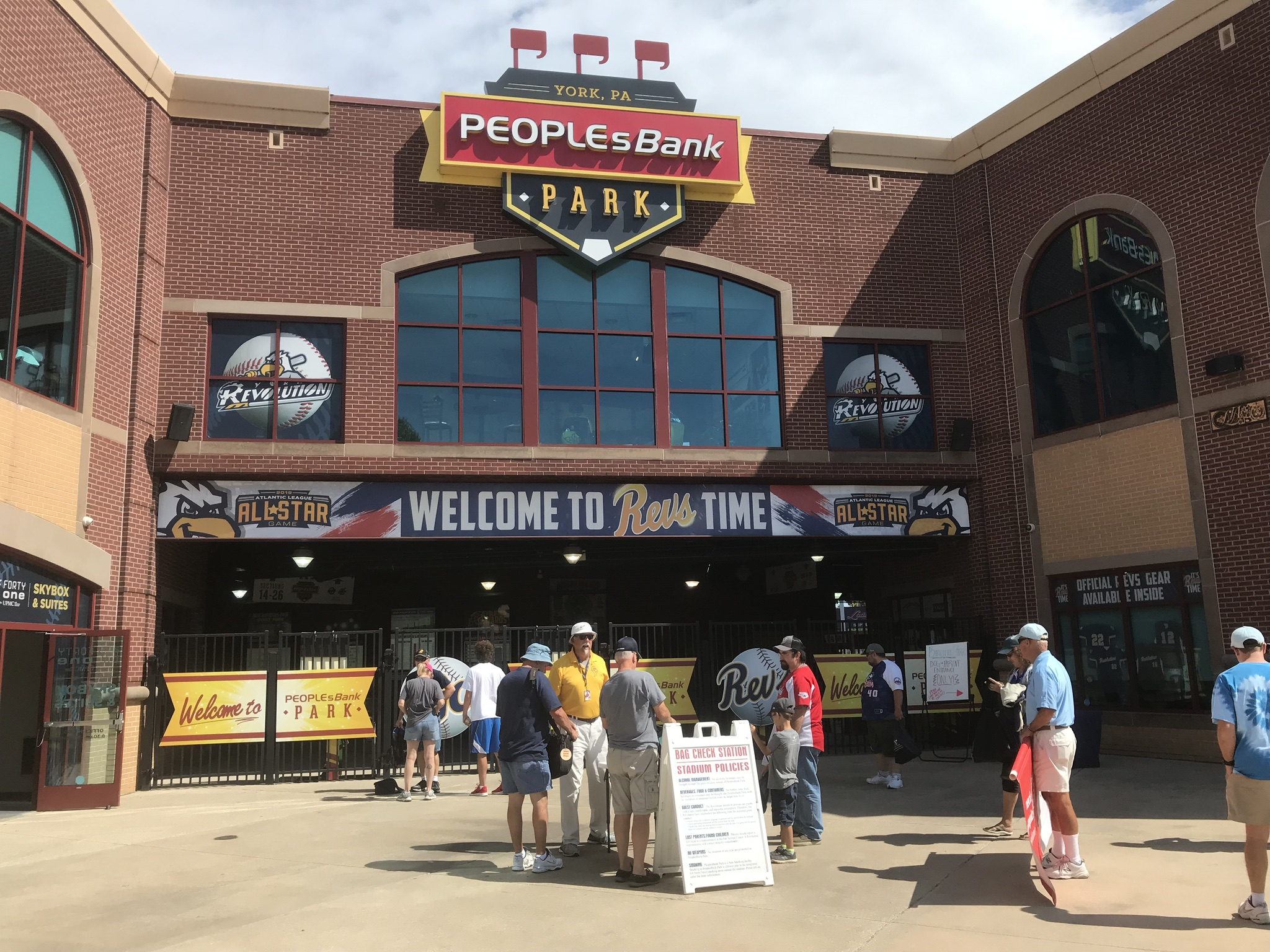
- The ballpark entrance in September 2019

- Location within Pennsylvania Location within the United States
- Interactive map of WellSpan Park
- Former names: PeoplesBank Park (2016–2022); Santander Stadium (2014–2015); Sovereign Bank Stadium (2007–2013)
- Address: 5 Brooks Robinson Way; York, Pennsylvania
- Coordinates: 39°58′3″N 76°43′45″W
- Owner: York County Industrial Development Authority
- Operator: Opening Day Partners; York Revolution
- Capacity: 7,500
- Surface: Grass
- Field size: Left field: 300 ft (91 m); Center field: 405 ft (123 m); Right field: 326 ft (99 m); Left field wall: 37.7 ft (11.5 m)

Construction
- Groundbreaking: September 29, 2006
- Opened: June 15, 2007
- Cost: $32.5 million
- Architects: Tetra Tech, Inc.
- General contractor: Lobar Inc.

Tenant
- York Revolution (ALPB) 2007–present

WellSpan Park is a 7,500-seat baseball park in York, Pennsylvania. It is the home of the York Revolution of the Atlantic League of Professional Baseball. The park hosted its first regular season baseball game on June 16, 2007, as the Revolution defeated the Newark Bears, 9–6.

Located on Codorus Creek, the facility had been in the planning stages since 2003, but local politics and funding temporarily halted the plans. The city of York demolished 20 buildings in the Arch Street neighborhood in June 2006, with construction beginning in September 2006. Due to inclement weather, WellSpan Park opened one month later than originally planned. The naming rights were purchased by Sovereign Bank, a banking institution based in nearby Reading, for $2.7 million over ten years. The name was changed to "Santander Stadium" in October 2013 following the 2009 takeover of Sovereign Bank by Santander Bank. In December 2015, it was announced the park would be known as "PeoplesBank Park" under a new naming rights deal with locally owned PeoplesBank. In February 2023, it was announced the park would be known as WellSpan Park under a new naming rights deal with longstanding sponsor, WellSpan Health, a regional healthcare corporation and leader in orthopedic and sports medicine.

WellSpan Park was honored as the "Ballpark of the Year" by the Atlantic League of Professional Baseball following the end of its 2008 regular season. The award recognizes the efforts of the Revolution staff and groundskeepers, judging such criteria as field conditions, stadium operations, cleanliness, and atmosphere.

== History ==
The city of York had been trying to pursue the construction of a baseball stadium for ten years. It seemed to be coming together in 2003, until politics and financial pressure prevented the ballpark from being built. Many Yorkers hoped to see a team fielded in the same inaugural season as the neighboring Lancaster Barnstormers, but that opportunity slipped away. The ballpark was originally slated to be located at Small Athletic Field, on York City School District property. The district board vetoed the stadium as they believed that their money could be better used for a more practical renovation plan for Small Athletic Field. Over the span of three years, ballpark planning weathered many inclines and declines until a hard-fought agreement was made to build in the Arch Street neighborhood. Other locations that were considered but never came to fruition were Hoffman Field, the home of the former York White Roses, and the Ohio Blender site.

WellSpan Park hosts the New Year's Revolution, the city's New Year's Eve celebration in which a large White Rose is dropped to count down to the New Year. The event's name alludes to a New Year's resolution and the Revolution baseball team. The former venue for the White Rose drop was the city square.

The stadium hosted the 2011 Atlantic League All-Star Game on July 14, 2011. The first pitch of the All-Star Game was thrown out by former Dover High School football player and then Green Bay Packer John Kuhn. The Revolution again hosted the Atlantic League All-Star Game at WellSpan Park in July 2019.

Since 2020, WellSpan Park has hosted the United Wiffleball National Championship.

== Ballpark attractions ==
=== Brooks Robinson Plaza ===
WellSpan Park features the Brooks Robinson Plaza at the homeplate entrance of the ballpark. The plaza features a statue of Brooks Robinson, along with information related to his 23-year career in professional baseball. In 1955, Robinson played with York's previous team, the White Roses, and at the end of the season was signed by in the Baltimore Orioles. The ballpark itself resembles Oriole Park at Camden Yards, in tribute to Brooks Robinson and the Baltimore Orioles, the local Major League favorite. The dimensions are the same as those of the former Memorial Stadium, the Orioles' previous home.

In addition to the Brooks Robinson Plaza, the official postal address of WellSpan Park was changed to 5 Brooks Robinson Way in the fall of 2007. The change was made to honor Robinson's baseball career, which started in the city of York.

=== The Arch Nemesis ===
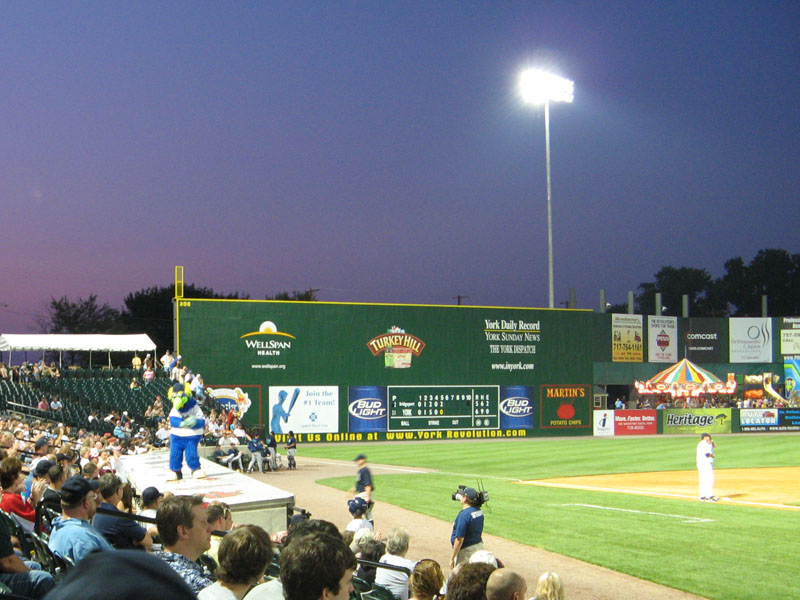
The Arch Nemesis

At 37 feet 8 inches (11.48 m), the left field wall of WellSpan Park is taller than any other fence in professional baseball, including the famous Green Monster at Fenway Park, home to the Boston Red Sox of Major League Baseball. The Green Monster measures at 37 feet 2 inches (11.33 m) high, but the Arch Nemesis in York stands 6 inches (15 cm) taller. The first home run over and the first base hit off the wall came in York's second game at the stadium on June 16, 2007.

The height of the left field wall was increased to help compensate for a small stadium site. Architects were challenged to fit a ballpark between Arch Street and a parallel railway line less than 600 feet (180 m) away and to provide a minimal amount of onsite parking (200 spaces) in the same plan. The best overall layout for the site placed the left field foul pole close to Arch Street and about 300 feet (91 m) from home plate, a condition that is known as a "Short Porch" and represents an easy home run opportunity for professional baseball players. Since moving the foul pole any further from home plate would require expanding the site by disrupting Arch Street (which was not an option), the planners increased the height of the left field fence to make home runs more challenging, given the short foul line. The name alludes to Arch Street and to the wall's ability to act as a primary formidable opponent (or arch nemesis) against home-run attempts.

=== Four scoreboards ===
In addition to a modern, animated, full-color electronic scoreboard in right field, WellSpan Park features an old-fashioned, manually operated scoreboard at the base of the "Arch Nemesis" in left field. A manual scoreboard is another characteristic shared between York's tall outfield wall and its counterpart in Boston, Massachusetts. Two additional monochromatic, non-animated electronic scoreboards on the façade of the skybox level, one along the first base line and another along the third base line, display game status.

=== Other ballpark attractions ===
Additional attractions include the Mezzogiorno Picnic Pavilion, with a capacity for 600 fans, that features a menu with traditional ballpark fare as well as regional favorites. Children at WellSpan Park can enjoy the Stauffer's DownTown Playground, an amusement section that features a carousel, a jungle web, playground equipment, and various inflatables. The playground is hosted by the Revolution's mascot, DownTown. The First Capital Credit Union Team Store, the York Revolution's official souvenir and apparel vendor, remains open throughout the year at the home plate entrance of WellSpan Park.

WellSpan Park has multiple seating options. A lawn seating area provides room for 1,600 fans. Executives can reserve one of five function rooms that overlook the field, with a total capacity of 300. These rooms include the Keystone Room, the Pennsylvania State Room, the Tri-State Room, the Piedmont Room, and White Rose Hall. The name of each room refers to York's geography: Keystone for Pennsylvania's official nickname, "the Keystone State"; the tri-state area including Pennsylvania, Maryland, and Delaware; the Piedmont plateau region; and York's official nickname, "the White Rose City." The conventional seating at the ballpark includes 7,500 green, chairback seats divided into two levels by an open, 360° concourse.

WellSpan Park features a miniature, fully functional cannon that is fired when one of the Revolution batters hits a home run or when the team scores a home victory. The cannon is operated by a mascot named Cannonball Charlie, who wears a costume resembling a period Continental Army uniform.

== Concerts ==
The first major concert at WellSpan Park featured the blues-rock band, Blues Traveler, on June 14, 2008. A couple of months later, the Christian rock band, Sevenglory, played a post-game concert for the Revolution's Faith & Family Day, a celebration of York's Christian community.
