= 1983 Baseball Hall of Fame balloting =

Elections to the Baseball Hall of Fame

National Baseball

Hall of Fame and Museum
- New inductees: 4
- via BBWAA: 2
- via Veterans Committee: 2
- Total inductees: 184
- Induction date: July 31, 1983

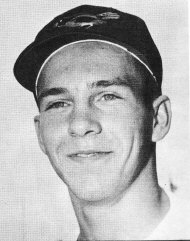
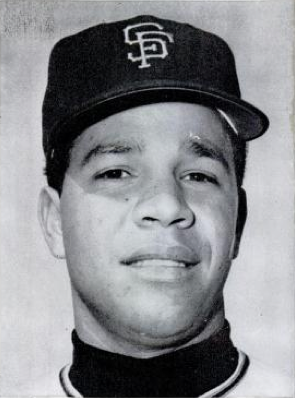
1983 BBWAA inductees Brooks Robinson (left) and Juan Marichal

Elections to the Baseball Hall of Fame for 1983 followed the system in place since 1978. The Baseball Writers' Association of America (BBWAA) voted by mail to select from recent major league players and elected two, Juan Marichal and Brooks Robinson. The Veterans Committee met in closed sessions to consider older major league players as well as managers, umpires, executives, and figures from the Negro leagues. It selected Walter Alston and George Kell. A formal induction ceremony was held in Cooperstown, New York, on July 31, 1983, with Commissioner of Baseball Bowie Kuhn presiding.

== BBWAA election ==
The BBWAA was authorized to elect players active in 1963 or later, but not after 1977; the ballot included candidates from the 1982 ballot who received at least 5% of the vote but were not elected, along with selected players, chosen by a screening committee, whose last appearance was in 1977. All 10-year members of the BBWAA were eligible to vote.

Voters were instructed to cast votes for up to 10 candidates; any candidate receiving votes on at least 75% of the ballots would be honored with induction to the Hall. The ballot consisted of 46 players; a total of 374 ballots were cast, with 281 votes required for election. A total of 3,125 individual votes were cast, an average of 8.36 per ballot. Those candidates receiving less than 5% of the vote will not appear on future BBWAA ballots but may eventually be considered by the Veterans Committee.

Candidates who were eligible for the first time are indicated here with a dagger (†). The one candidate who received at least 75% of the vote and was elected is indicated in bold italics; candidates who have since been elected in subsequent elections are indicated in italics. The 23 candidates who received less than 5% of the vote, thus becoming ineligible for future BBWAA consideration, are indicated with an asterisk (*).

Gil Hodges and Red Schoendienst were on the ballot for the 15th and final time.

Player	Votes	Percent	Change	Year
**Brooks Robinson**†	344	92.0	-	1st
**Juan Marichal**	313	83.7	▲10.2%	3rd
Harmon Killebrew	269	71.9	▲12.6%	3rd
Luis Aparicio	252	67.4	▲25.5%	5th
Hoyt Wilhelm	243	65.0	▲8.1%	6th
Don Drysdale	242	64.7	▲8.6%	9th
Gil Hodges	237	63.4	▲14.0%	15th
Nellie Fox	173	46.3	▲15.7%	13th
Billy Williams	153	40.9	▲17.5%	2nd
Red Schoendienst	146	39.0	▲6.5%	15th
Jim Bunning	138	36.9	▲3.6%	7th
Harvey Kuenn	77	20.6	▲5.7%	7th
Maury Wills	77	20.6	▼1.3%	6th
Tony Oliva	75	20.1	▲4.9%	2nd
Roger Maris	69	18.4	▲1.8%	10th
Orlando Cepeda	59	15.8	▲5.7%	4th
Bill Mazeroski	48	12.8	▲6.1%	6th
Lew Burdette	43	11.5	▲1.1%	11th
Roy Face	32	8.6	▲3.3%	8th
Elston Howard	32	8.6	▼1.0%	10th
Don Larsen	22	5.9	▼1.8%	10th
Joe Torre†	20	5.3	-	1st
Thurman Munson	18	4.8	▼1.5%	3rd
Dick Allen†*	14	3.7	-	1st
Vada Pinson*	12	3.2	▲1.8%	3rd
Jim Perry*	7	1.9	-	2nd
Boog Powell†*	5	1.3	-	1st
Ray Sadecki†*	2	0.5	-	1st
Dave Giusti†*	1	0.3	-	1st
Tommy Helms†*	1	0.3	-	1st
Félix Millán†*	1	0.3	-	1st
Mike Cuellar†*	0	0.0	-	1st
Larry Dierker†*	0	0.0	-	1st
Pat Dobson†*	0	0.0	-	1st
Al Downing†*	0	0.0	-	1st
Joe Hoerner†*	0	0.0	-	1st
Randy Hundley†*	0	0.0	-	1st
Carlos May†*	0	0.0	-	1st
Ken McMullen†*	0	0.0	-	1st
Bill Melton†*	0	0.0	-	1st
Gary Nolan†*	0	0.0	-	1st
Doug Rader†*	0	0.0	-	1st
Cookie Rojas†*	0	0.0	-	1st
Diego Seguí†*	0	0.0	-	1st
Bill Singer†*	0	0.0	-	1st
Jimmy Wynn†*	0	0.0	-	1st

Key to colors
Elected to the Hall. These individuals are also indicated in **bold italics**.
Players who were elected in future elections. These individuals are also indicated in plain italics.
Players not yet elected who returned on the 1984 ballot.
Eliminated from future BBWAA voting. These individuals remain eligible for future Veterans Committee consideration.

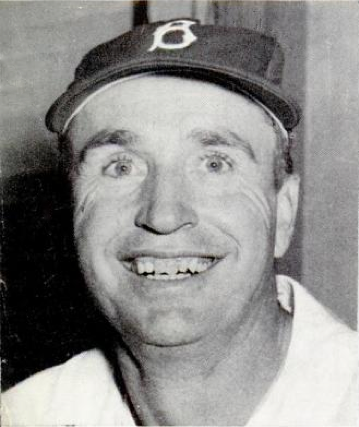
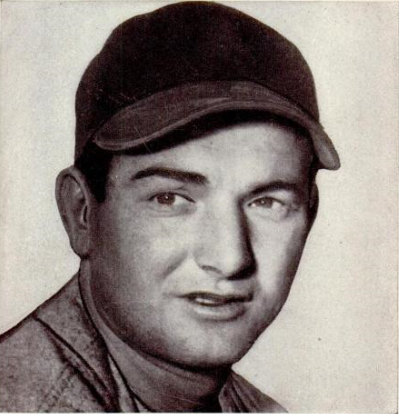
1983 Veterans Committee inductees Walter Alston (left) and George Kell

The newly-eligible players included 22 All-Stars, three of whom were not included on the ballot, representing a total of 68 All-Star selections. Among the new candidates were 15-time All-Star Brooks Robinson, 9-time All-Star Joe Torre, 7-time All-Star Dick Allen and 5-time All-Star Cookie Rojas. The field included four MVPs (Allen, Robinson, Torre and Boog Powell), one Cy Young Award-winner (Mike Cuellar), and two Rookies of the Year (Allen and Tommy Helms). Brooks Robinson also had 16 Gold Gloves, the all-time record at third base.

Players eligible for the first time who were not included on the ballot were: Ken Boswell, Ollie Brown, Willie Crawford, Bruce Dal Canton, Tom Hall, Steve Hargan, Terry Harmon, Mike Hegan, Bob Heise, Jerry Johnson, Ed Kirkpatrick, George Mitterwald, Dave Nelson, Phil Roof, and Gary Ross.

== J. G. Taylor Spink Award ==
Si Burick (1909–1986) received the J. G. Taylor Spink Award honoring a baseball writer. The award was voted at the December 1982 meeting of the BBWAA, and included in the summer 1983 ceremonies.
