= Green Monster =

Left field wall of Fenway Park in Boston

Coordinates: 42°20′49.6″N 71°05′50.4″W

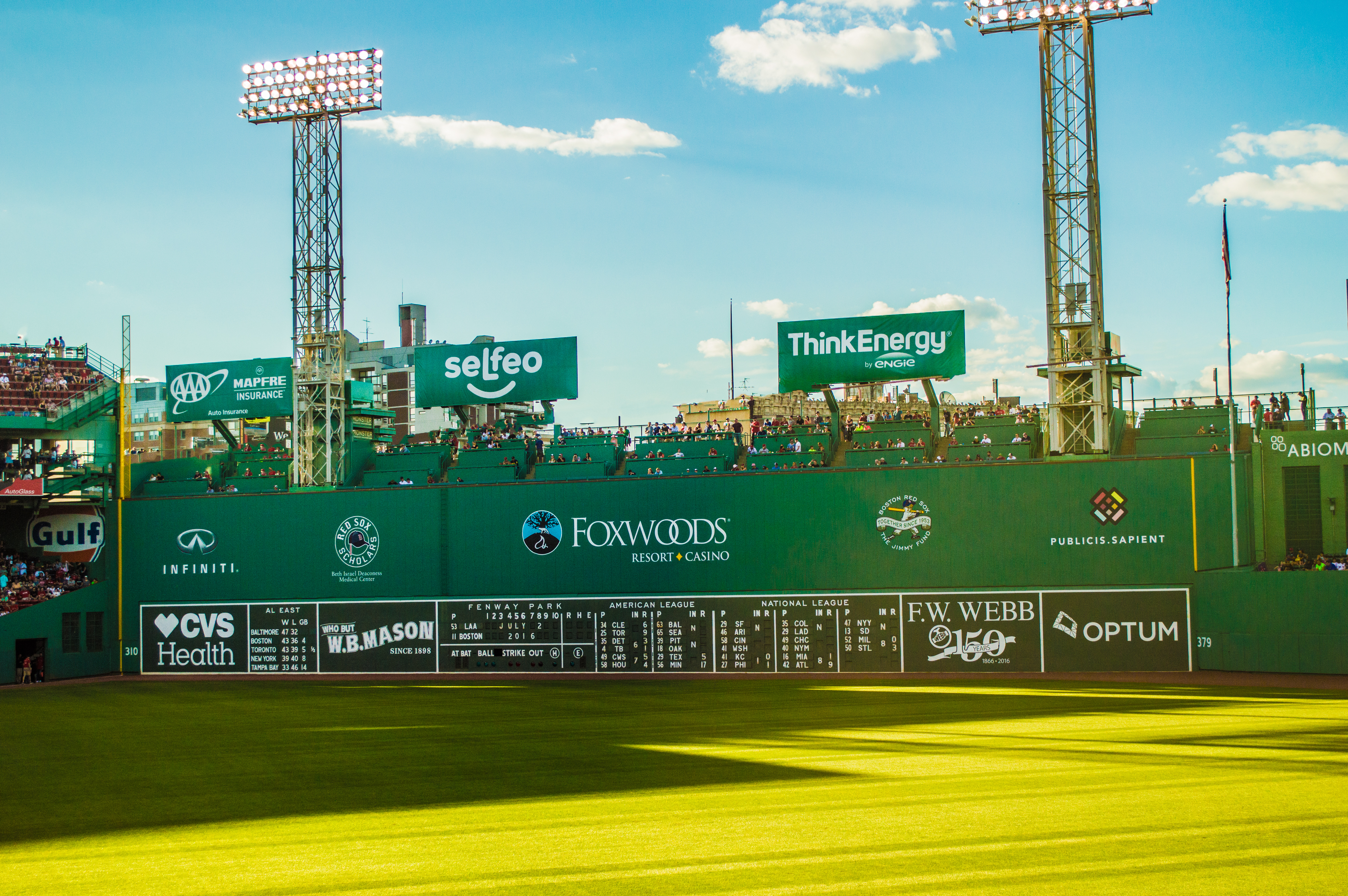
The Green Monster in July 2016

The Green Monster is a popular nickname for the 37-foot-2-inch-high (11.33 m) left field wall at Fenway Park, home to the Boston Red Sox of Major League Baseball. The wall is 310 feet (94 m) from home plate at the left-field foul line, making it a popular target for right-handed hitters.

== Overview ==
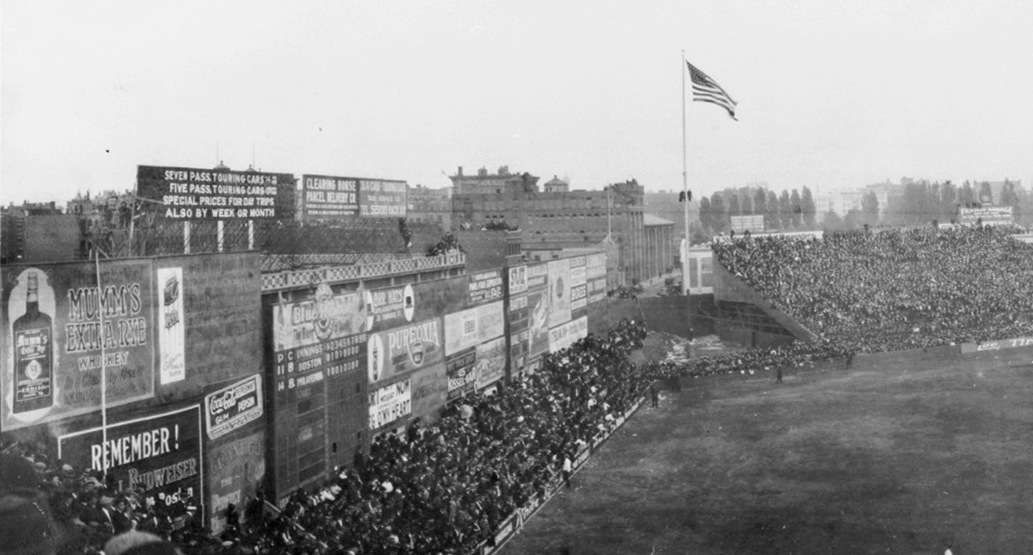
The original ad-covered wall in 1914, with overflow fan seating in front of the wall's base on "Duffy's Cliff"

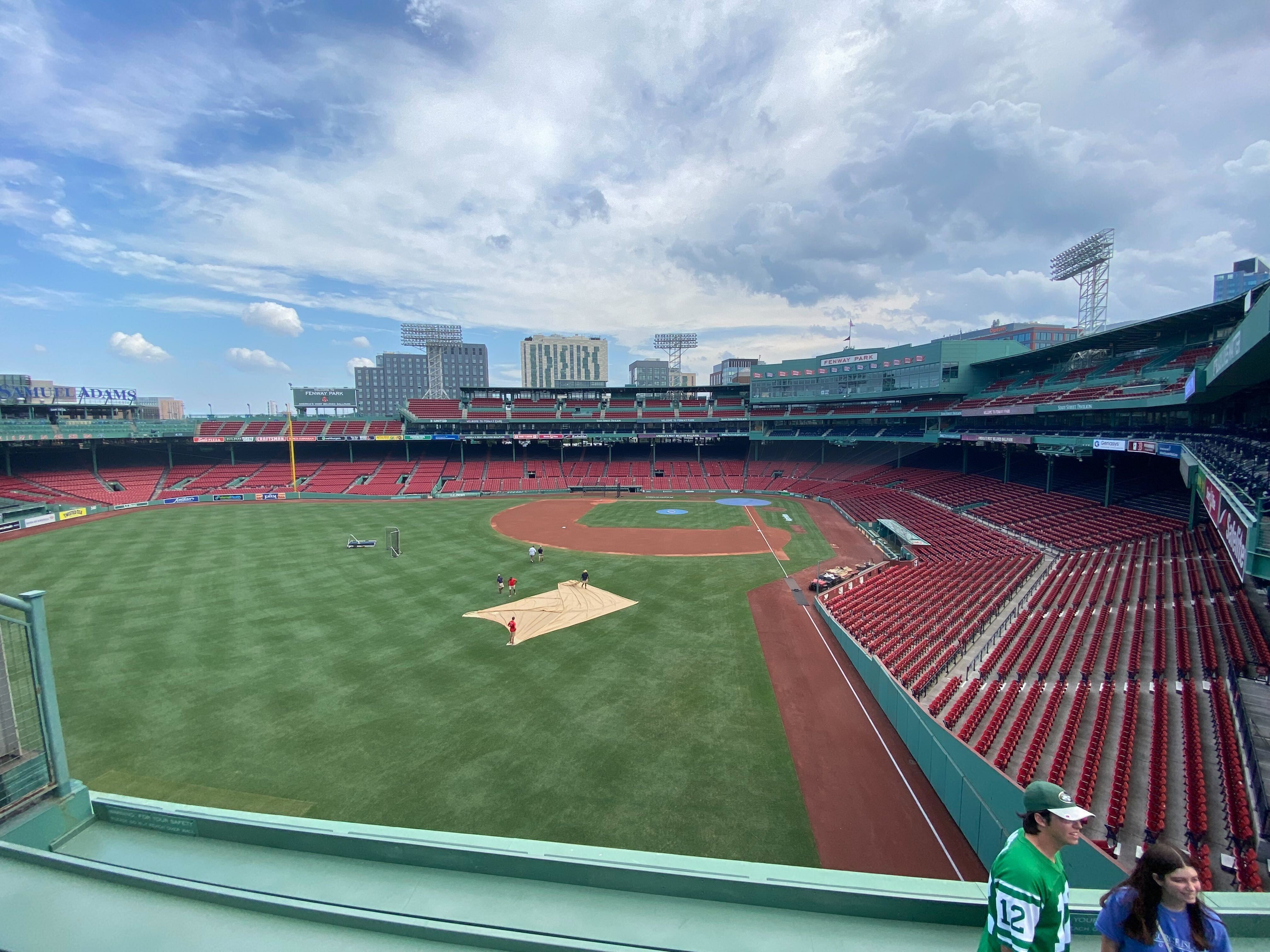
View of Fenway Park from atop the Green Monster in 2022

Fenway Park dimensions, in feet as measured from home plate

The wall was part of the original ballpark construction of 1912, along Fenway's north side facing Lansdowne Street. It is made of wood and was covered in tin and concrete in 1934. It was then covered with hard plastic in 1976. A manual scoreboard is set into the wall, which has been there, in one form or another, at least as far back as 1914. The wall was not painted green until 1947; before that, it was covered with advertisements.

The "Green Monster" designation appeared in print by November 1956, although for much of its history it was simply called "The Wall", an alternate nickname that has endured into the 21st century.

The Green Monster is the highest among the walls in current Major League Baseball (MLB) fields, and it is the second highest among all professional baseball fields, including Minor League Baseball. In 2007, it was surpassed by "The Arch Nemesis"—the left field wall of the independent baseball WellSpan Park in York, Pennsylvania—which is approximately 6 inches (15 cm) taller.

Ballparks occupied by professional baseball teams have often featured high fences to hide the field from external viewers, particularly behind open areas of the outfield where bleacher seating is low-lying or non-existent. The wall might also reduce the number of "cheap" home runs due to the barrier's relatively tall height above the playing surface. Fenway's wall serves both purposes. Past ballparks of Fenway's era or even later which featured high fences in play included Baker Bowl, Washington Park, Ebbets Field, League Park, Griffith Stadium, Shibe Park, and more recently, Los Angeles Memorial Coliseum. Fenway is the last of the exceptionally high-walled major-league ballparks. In modern ballparks, some relatively high walls have been constructed for their novelty rather than by necessity.

During 2001 and 2002, the Green Monster's height record was temporarily surpassed by the center field wall at Riverfront Stadium (then known as Cinergy Field for sponsorship reasons) in Cincinnati. During construction of the adjacent Great American Ball Park, a large section of seats was removed from Riverfront's center field area to make room and a 40-foot (12 m) black wall was erected as a temporary batter's eye. The entire wall was in play. This new wall was often called the "Black Monster". When Riverfront Stadium was demolished in 2002, the Green Monster reclaimed the record.

In honor of the wall, the Red Sox' mascot is Wally the Green Monster. In May 2025, the Red Sox announced a new City Connect jersey which pays homage to the Green Monster, featuring a solid green color and lettering in the same font as the letters on the wall.

== Dimensions ==
The wall is 37 feet 2 inches (11.33 m) tall. At 231 feet (70 m) wide, (Note: The noted width appears to reflect the distance from the leftmost edge of the wall, where it meets the grandstands, to the yellow line near the flagpole.) it has an overall surface area of 8,585.5 square feet (797.62 m^{2}).

The wall is signed as being 310 feet from home plate at the left-field foul line, although for many years, until May 1995, it was signed as being 315 feet. (Note: The distance from home plate down the left-field foul line to the wall has been measured by reporters as being 309 feet 3 inches (94.26 m) to 309 feet 5 inches (94.31 m).) The posted distance in metric was not adjusted from 96 meters (315 ft) to 94.5 meters (310 ft) until 1998. The wall is signed as being 379 feet (116 m) deep near the ballpark's flagpole in center field, where a vertical yellow line denotes the rightmost limit of the wall that is in play. A portion of the wall continues behind the flagpole, but a ball hit to this area (striking the wall to the right of the yellow line) is considered a home run.

By contrast, the right-field wall is less than 6 feet (1.8 m) tall. While it is signed as being only 302 feet (92 m) from home plate at the Pesky Pole along the right-field foul line, it sharply angles back and is signed as being 380 feet (120 m) deep at the right end of the bullpens. This makes the overall expanse of Fenway's right field significantly larger than left field.

== Effect on play ==
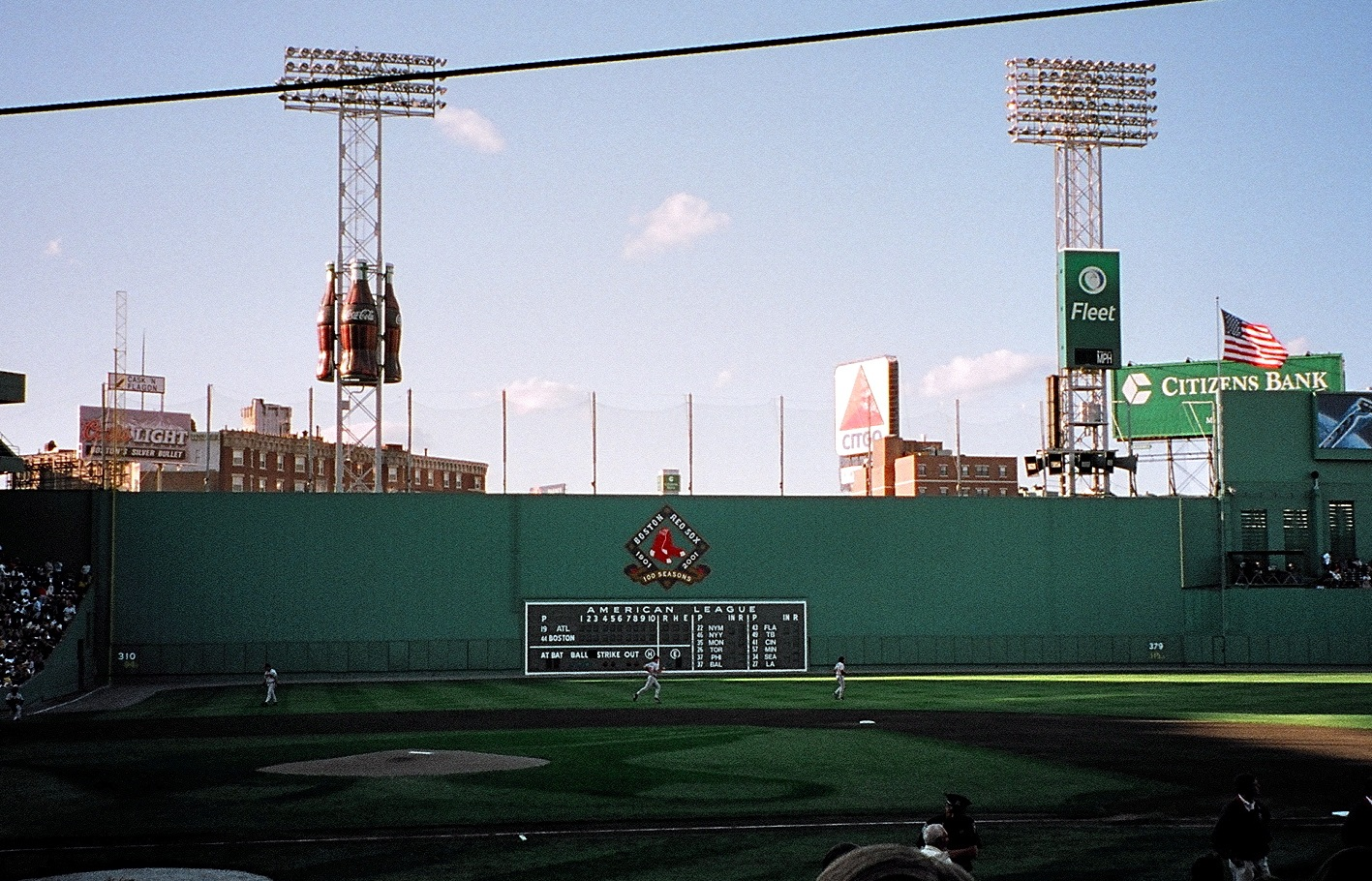
The Green Monster in 2001, with large Coca-Cola advertising bottles on the leftmost light tower

The Green Monster is famous for preventing home runs on many line drives that would clear the walls of other ballparks. A side effect of this is to increase the prevalence of doubles, since this is the most common result when the ball is hit off the wall (often referred to as a "wallball double"). The major-league record for doubles in a season was set by Red Sox player Earl Webb, who hit 67 doubles in 1931, although only 33 of them were hit at Fenway. (Note: In addition to his 33 doubles at Fenway, Webb hit six doubles at Braves Field in Boston, where the Red Sox of the era played some home games, and 28 in road games.) This record has rarely been challenged, and no player has hit 60 or more doubles in a season since 1936.

Some left fielders, predominantly those with significant Fenway experience, have become adept at fielding caroms off the wall to throw runners out at second base or hold the batter to a single. Compared with other current major-league parks, the wall's placement creates a comparatively shallow left field, and many long fly balls that could be caught in a larger park rebound off the Green Monster for base hits. Kansas City Royals Hall of Famer George Brett, a third baseman who would occasionally fill in at left field when needed, has described playing left field at Fenway Park as one of his favorite moments from his entire career.

While the wall turns many would-be line-drive homers into doubles, it also allows some high yet shallow fly balls to clear the field of play for a home run, one notable example being Bucky Dent's home run in the 1978 American League East tie-breaker game. As described by Don Baylor, who played for the Red Sox from 1985-1987: "High fly balls that are outs almost anywhere else will be a home run here, but low line drives that are home runs almost anywhere else will only be a double here, maybe even a single."

== Features ==
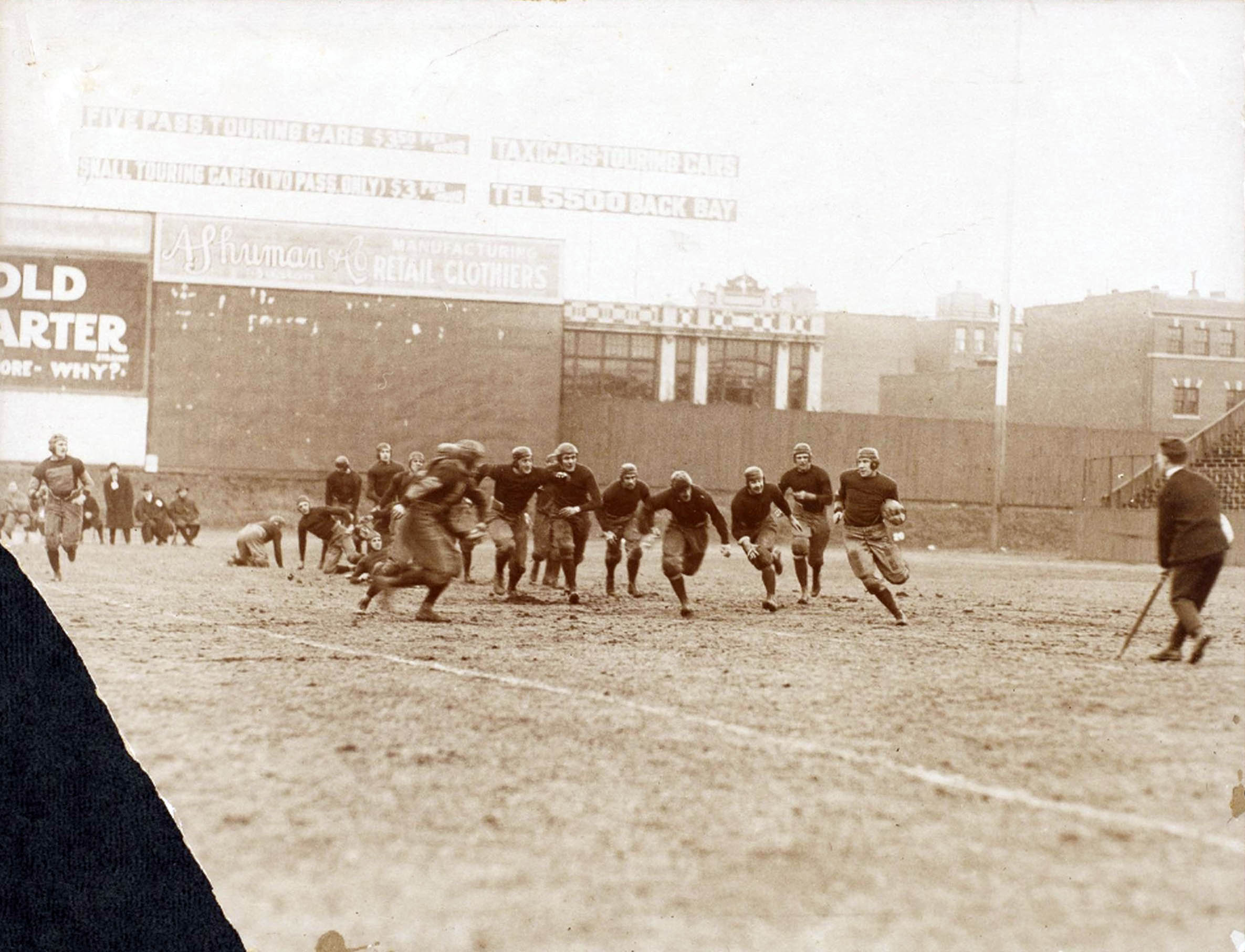
The center-field end of the wall and Duffy's Cliff in 1916, during a college football game at Fenway

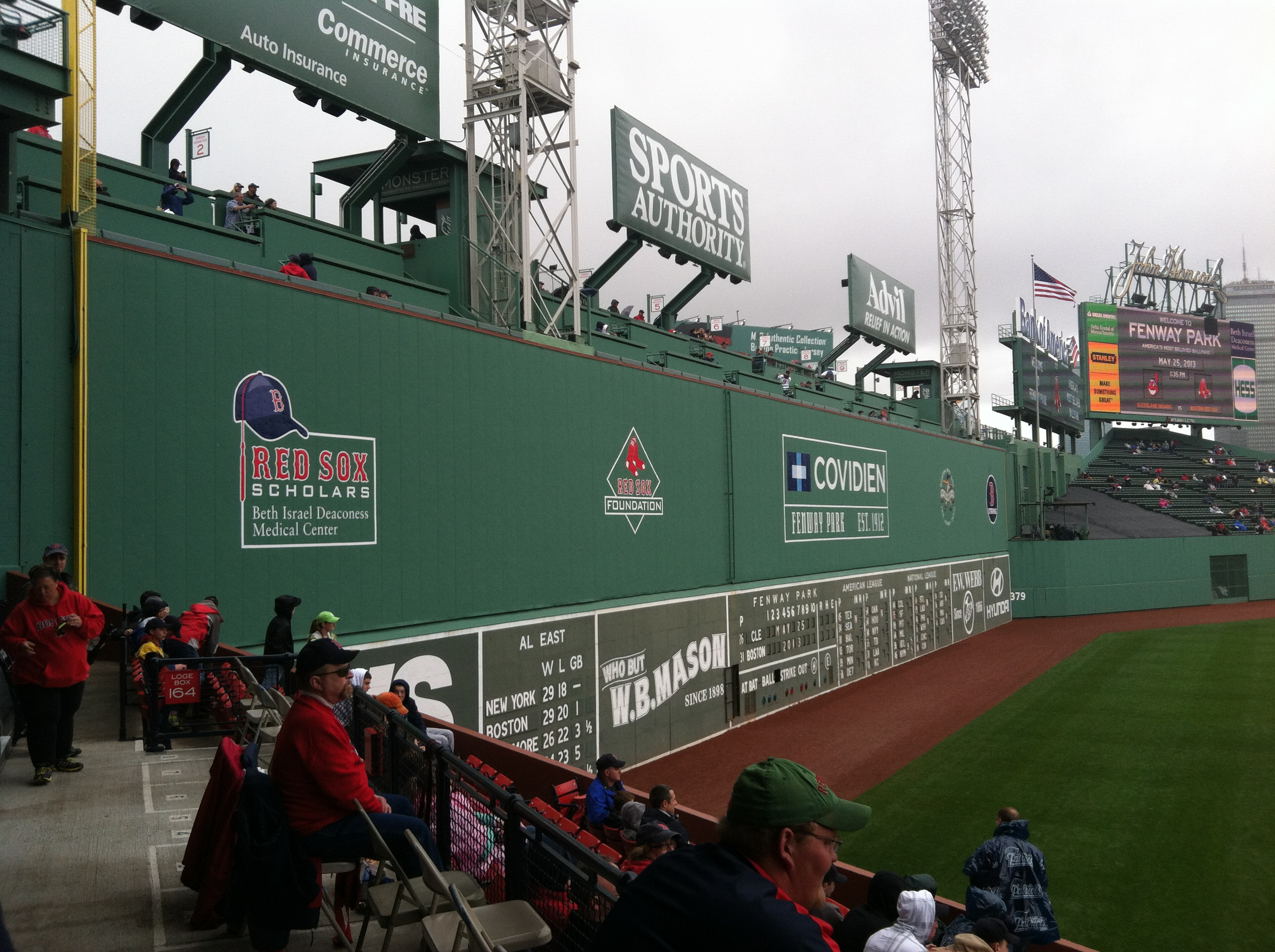
View of the scoreboard from the left-field grandstands in 2013; an access door is open near the W. B. Mason advertisement

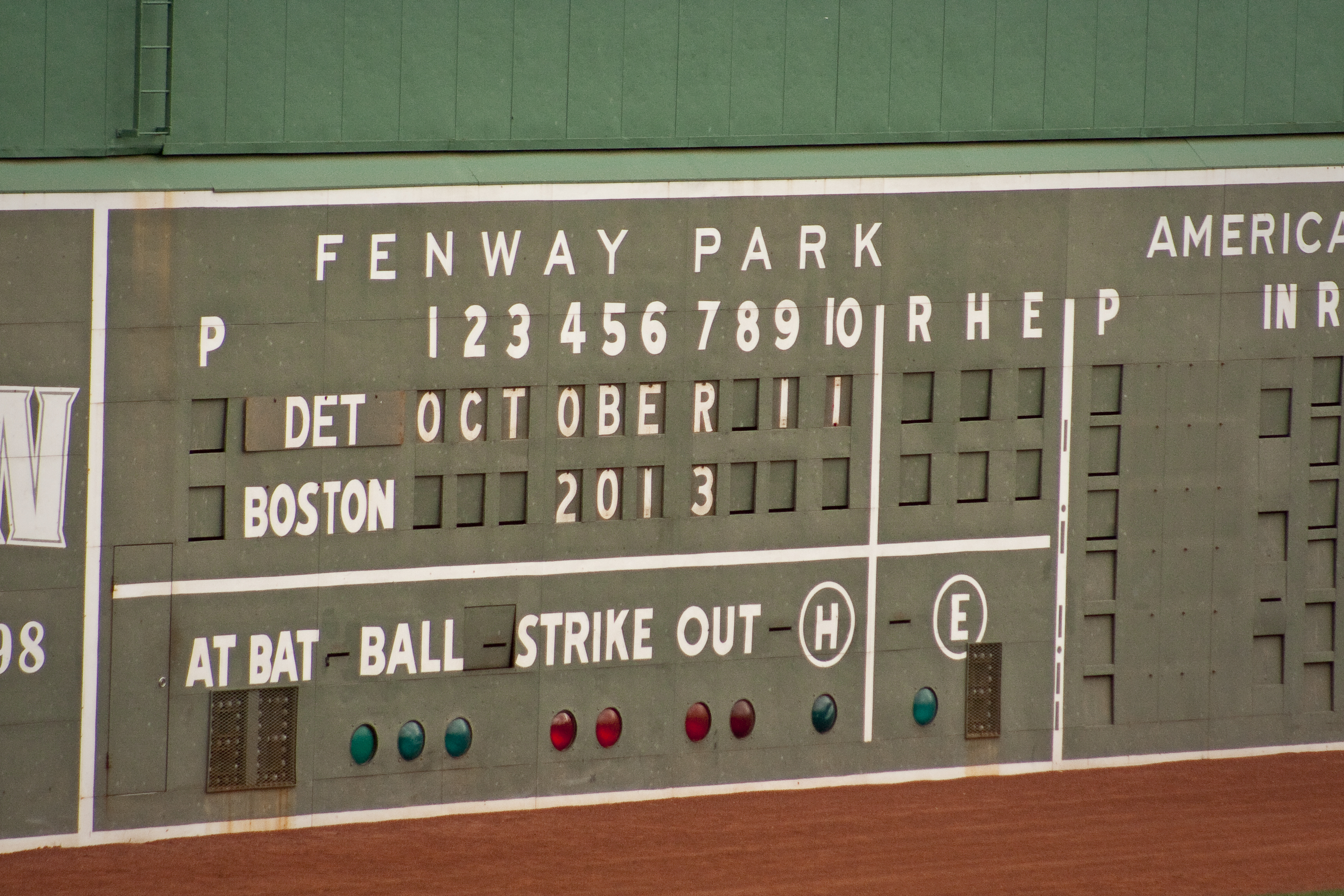
Partial view of the scoreboard in 2013, with TAY in Morse code visible in the rightmost white stripe

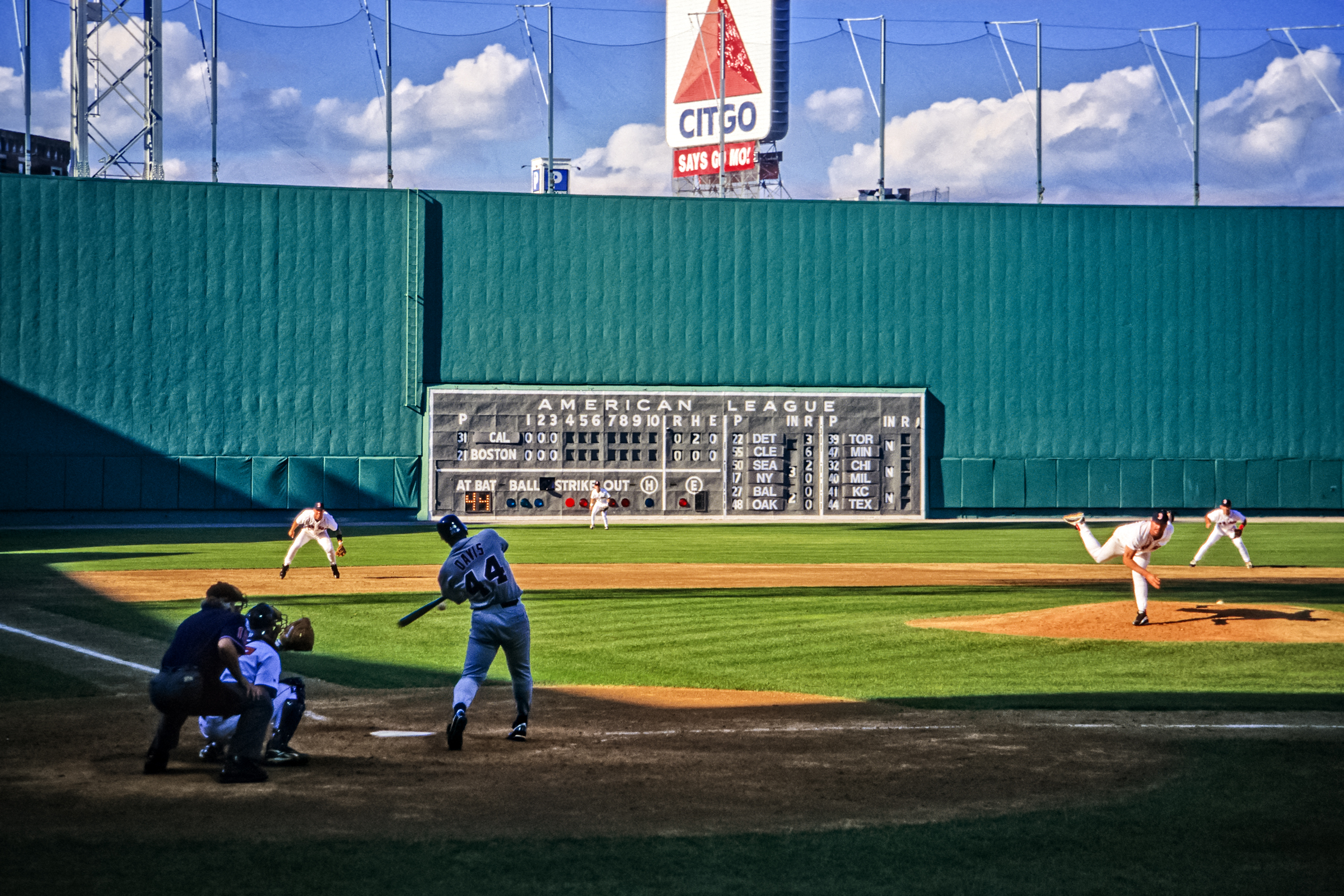
The scoreboard in 1996, with the ladder visible at its left edge

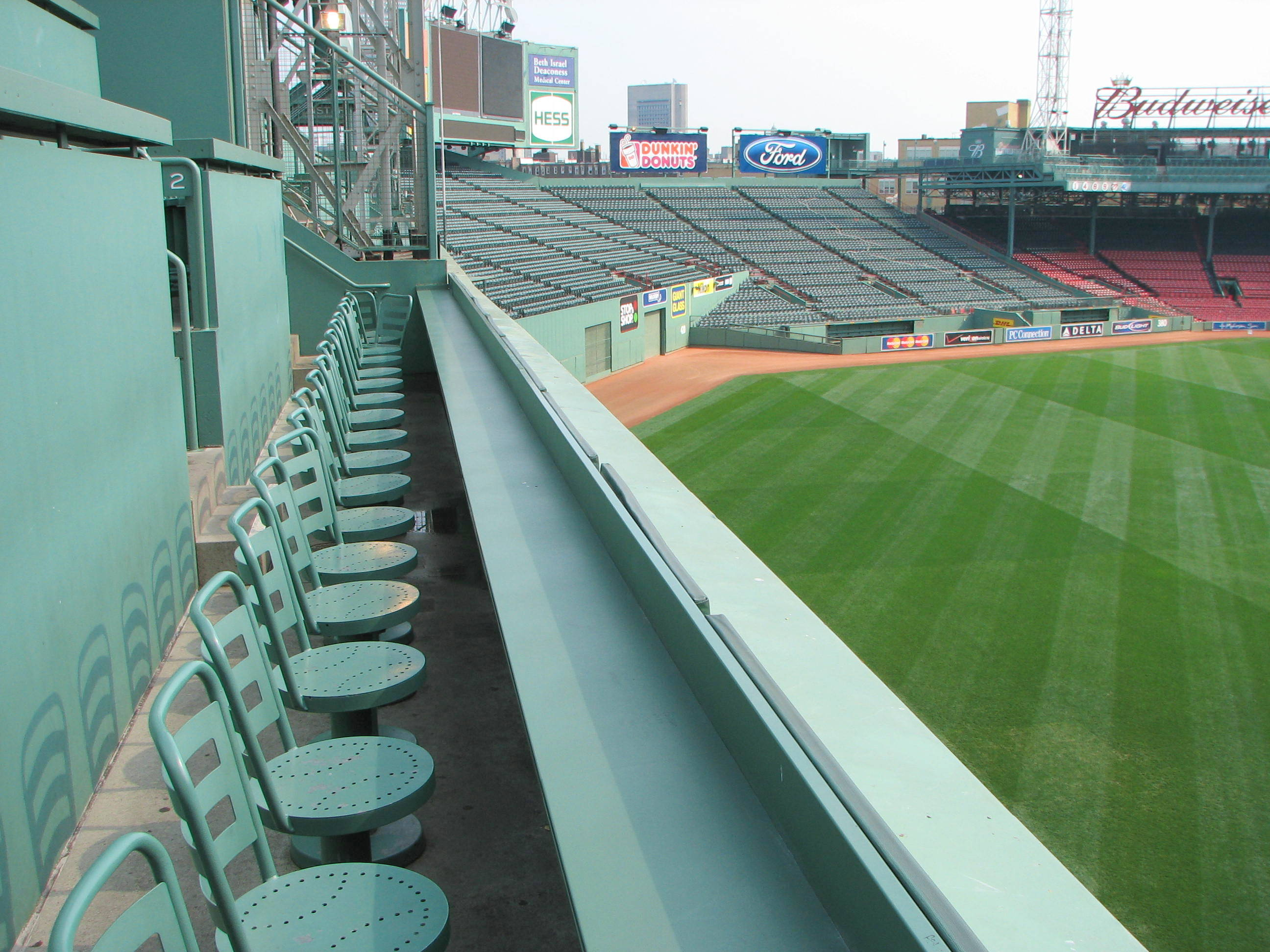
Seats atop the wall in 2007

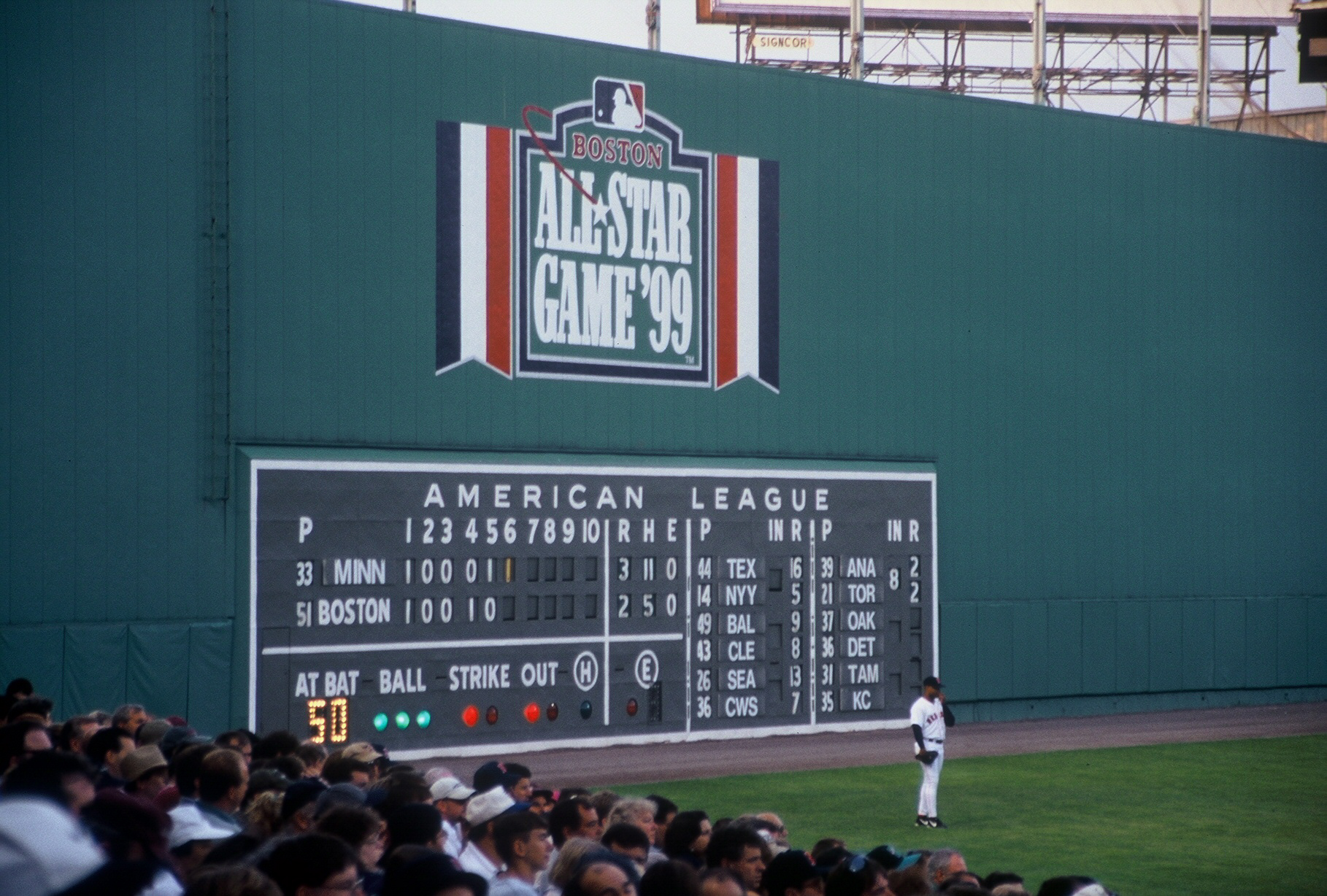
The Green Monster in August 1998

=== Duffy's Cliff ===
From 1912 to 1933, a 10-foot-high (3.0 m) mound formed an incline in front of the Green Monster, extending from the left-field foul pole to the center field flag pole. This earthwork formed a "terrace", a common feature of ballparks of the day (where a dirt-surfaced warning track would normally be today), whose purpose was to make up the difference in grade between street level and field level, as with Cincinnati's Crosley Field. It also served to double as a seating area to handle overflow crowds, another common practice of that era.

As a result of the terrace, when overflow crowds were not seated atop it, a left fielder in Fenway Park had to play the territory running uphill. Boston's first star left fielder, Duffy Lewis, mastered the skill so well that the area became known as "Duffy's Cliff". In contrast, rotund outfielder Bob Fothergill, known by the indelicate nicknames of "Fats" or "Fatty", reportedly once chased a ball up the terrace, slipped and fell, and rolled downhill.

In 1934, Red Sox owner Tom Yawkey arranged to flatten the ground in left field so that Duffy's Cliff no longer existed, and it became part of the lore of Fenway Park.

=== Scoreboard ===
Long after the much-higher location manual scoreboard from c.1914 existed (as seen in the 1914 photo), the placement of the modern "ground-level" manual scoreboard occurred in 1934. It forms the lower half of the Green Monster and is still updated by hand from behind the wall throughout the game. The American League scores are also updated from behind the wall. The National League scores need to be updated from the front of the wall between innings. There is also a board which shows the current American League East standings. There are 127 slots in the wall and a team of three score keepers move around two-pound (0.9 kg), 13-by-16-inch (33 by 41 cm) plates to represent the score. Yellow numbers are used to represent in-inning scores and white numbers are used to represent final inning tallies. The numbers of the current pitchers weigh three pounds (1.4 kg) and measure 16 by 16 inches (41 by 41 cm).

Carlton Fisk's "body English" when he hit his game-winning home run in Game 6 of the 1975 World Series, "waving" the ball fair, was captured on a TV camera stationed in the scoreboard.

==== Morse code ====
In the vertical white lines of the American League section of the scoreboard, Morse code representing the initials of former owners Thomas A. Yawkey and Jean R. Yawkey is visible. As shown in various photos of the wall, the patterns are ▄▄▄ ▄ ▄▄▄ ▄▄▄ ▄ ▄▄▄ ▄▄▄ (TAY) and ▄ ▄▄▄ ▄▄▄ ▄▄▄ ▄ ▄▄▄ ▄ ▄▄▄ ▄ ▄▄▄ ▄▄▄ (JRY), each of which runs from top to bottom in a white stripe.

=== The ladder ===
Comprising yet another quirk, a ladder is attached to the Green Monster, extending from near the upper-left portion of the scoreboard, 13 feet (4.0 m) above ground, to the top of the wall. Previously, members of the grounds crew would use the ladder to retrieve home run balls from the netting hung above the wall. After the net was removed for the addition of the Monster seats, the ladder ceased to have any real function, yet it remains in place as a historic relic.

The placement of the ladder is noteworthy given the fact that it is in fair territory; it is the only such ladder in the major leagues. On various occasions, a batted ball has struck the ladder during game play. Carl Yastrzemski, who played for the Red Sox for 23 seasons including over 1900 games in left field, highlighted the ladder's role in an inside-the-park home run by Red Sox first baseman Dick Stuart, generally regarded as slow-footed. On August 19, 1963, Stuart hit a high fly ball that ricocheted off the Green Monster—Yastrzemski said it hit the ladder, while contemporary newspaper reports noted that it "skinned off the wall" or "struck a ledge on top of the scoreboard"— and then off the head of Cleveland outfielder Vic Davalillo, before rolling far enough away to allow Stuart to score. An account of another inside-the-park home run that hit off the ladder, appearing in an October 1986 column by Dave Anderson of The New York Times, reportedly hit by visiting player Jim Lemon during the 1950s with Red Sox defenders Ted Williams in left field and Jimmy Piersall in center field, lacks detail or contemporary mention in newspapers. (Note: Anderson's account has subsequently been repeated, including by Peter Gammons in a 1995 article in The Boston Globe, by Dan Shaughnessy in a 1999 article in the Globe, and in a 1999 book by Shaughnessy. However, specifics such as what season it occurred during or which team Lemon was playing for, along with any contemporary account of such an event, are currently lacking. Lemon is also absent from a list of batters who hit inside-the-park home runs at Fenway, dating back to 1949, that was published in the Globe in 1961, and the Associated Press later stated that Dick Stuart's inside-the-park home run at Fenway in 1963 was the first one ever hit to left field there.)

A common myth that has perpetuated is that if a ball strikes the ladder and then bounces over the wall or out of play, the batter will be awarded a ground-rule triple. There is no such rule in the ground rules at Fenway, nor in any major-league ballpark. Fenway's ground rules state: "Fair ball striking the ladder below top of left field wall and bounding out of park: Two Bases."

=== Green Monster seating ===
In 1936, the Red Sox installed a 23-foot (7.0 m) net above the Monster in order to protect the storefronts on adjoining Lansdowne Street from home run balls. The net remained until the 2002–03 offseason, when the team's new ownership constructed a new seating section atop the wall to accommodate 274 fans. Wildly popular, these "Monster seats" were part of a larger expansion plan for Fenway Park seating. The Red Sox later added a smaller seating section in 2005, dubbed the "Nation's Nest," located between the main seating section and the center field scoreboard.

=== Advertisements ===
After the wall was painted green in 1947, advertisements did not appear on the wall until the late 1990s when the 1999 MLB All-Star Game at Fenway was being promoted. Various ads have appeared above the scoreboard since then, such as for the Jimmy Fund, W. B. Mason, Covidien, and Foxwoods Resort Casino. Large Coca-Cola bottles, placed on the left light tower in 1997, were a target for power-hitters. These three-dimensional advertisements were taken down before the 2008 season, when an LED sign was built above the new left-field upper-deck seats. As a lead up to his 500th career home run, Manny Ramirez's home run count was tallied on the bottom of the light tower. Ads beside the manual scoreboard were added when the scoreboard was expanded. Part of the overall view above the left-field wall is the Boston Citgo sign, located outside of Fenway in Kenmore Square.

== Similar and related places ==
=== Major League Baseball ===
==== Former ballparks ====
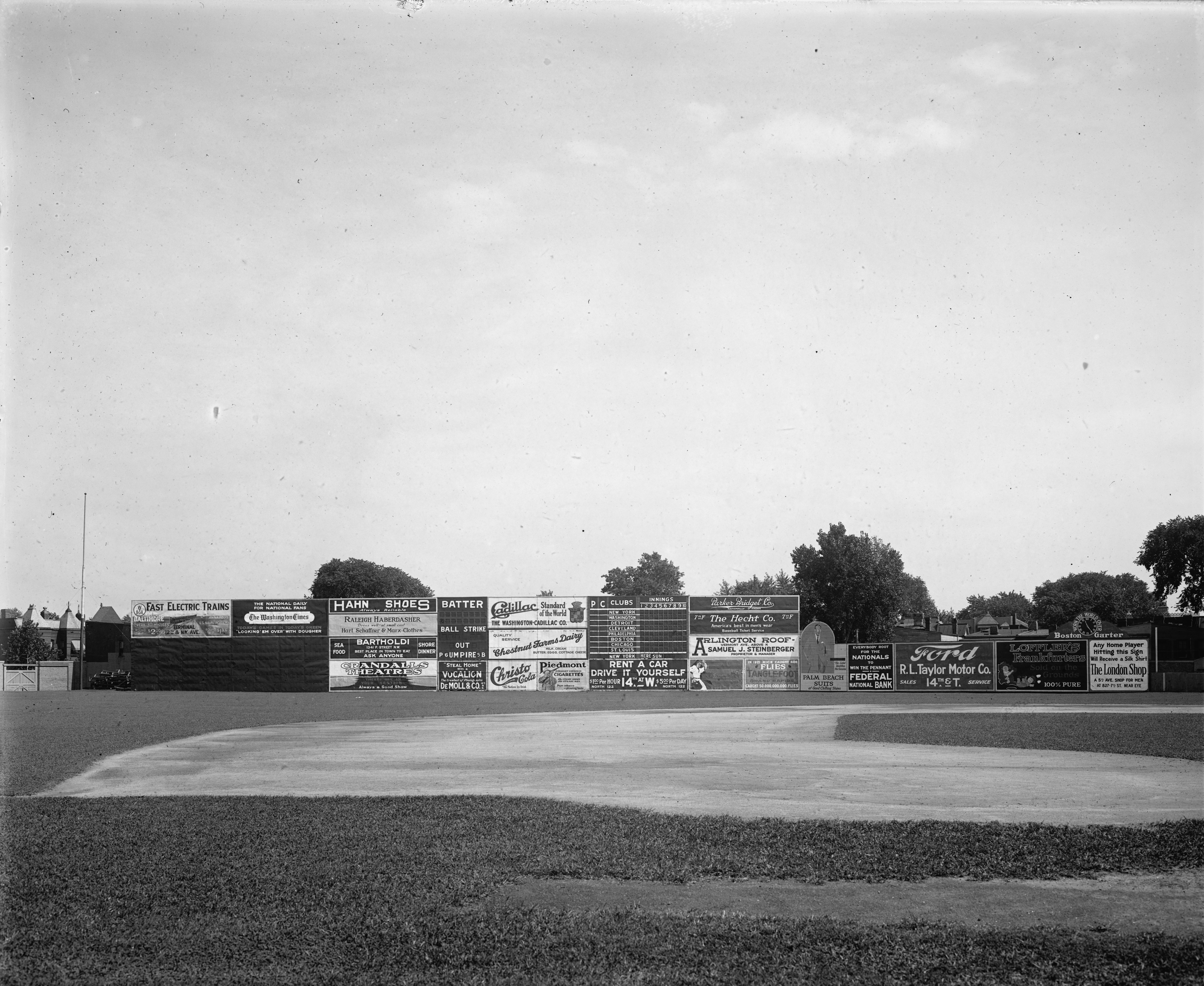
The right-field wall at Griffith Stadium in the early 1920s

- Griffith Stadium in Washington, D.C., the longtime home of the Washington Senators, had its own version of the Green Monster in right field.
- The Hubert H. Humphrey Metrodome, which was demolished in 2014, was the home ballpark of the Minnesota Twins and the Minnesota Golden Gophers baseball program. A 23-foot-high (7.0 m) advertising-covered tarp hung over the fold-away football seating in right field and was derisively referred to as the "Hefty Bag" or "Baggie" for its black garbage bag-like appearance. As hitting the exposed folded seats above it was considered a home run and the tarp provided a trampoline-like bounce to assure a double, it was an attractive target for left-handed power hitters.
- The Kingdome in Seattle, Washington, had a high right field wall that was dubbed "The Walla-Walla" after Walla Walla, Washington.
- Pro Player Stadium, the former home of the Florida Marlins, featured a smaller "Teal Monster" in left field from 1992, the team's debut season, until 2009, when the display was replaced by ad hoardings for the remaining 2010 and 2011 seasons before their move to Marlins Park. The board started out as manual but eventually was converted to a digital eggcrate display with remote control.

==== Current ballparks ====
- Daikin Park, home of the Houston Astros, has a wall inspired by the Green Monster in left field, atop which is mounted a train reminiscent of the operating days of the adjacent Union Station. The wall is 25 feet (7.6 m) deeper and 1 foot (0.30 m) higher than the Green Monster, but in front of it is a section of stands called the Crawford Boxes, which are only 19 feet (5.8 m) high and are 5 feet (1.5 m) deeper.
- Oracle Park, home of the San Francisco Giants, has a 24-foot-high (7.3 m) right field wall in honor of Willie Mays; the height in feet matches his retired uniform number.
- PNC Park, home of the Pittsburgh Pirates, has a 21-foot-high (6.4 m) right field wall, paying homage to the Pirates' Hall of Fame right fielder Roberto Clemente, who wore uniform number 21.
- Progressive Field, home of the Cleveland Guardians, has a 19-foot-high (5.8 m) left field wall, nicknamed the "little green monster".

=== Minor League Baseball ===
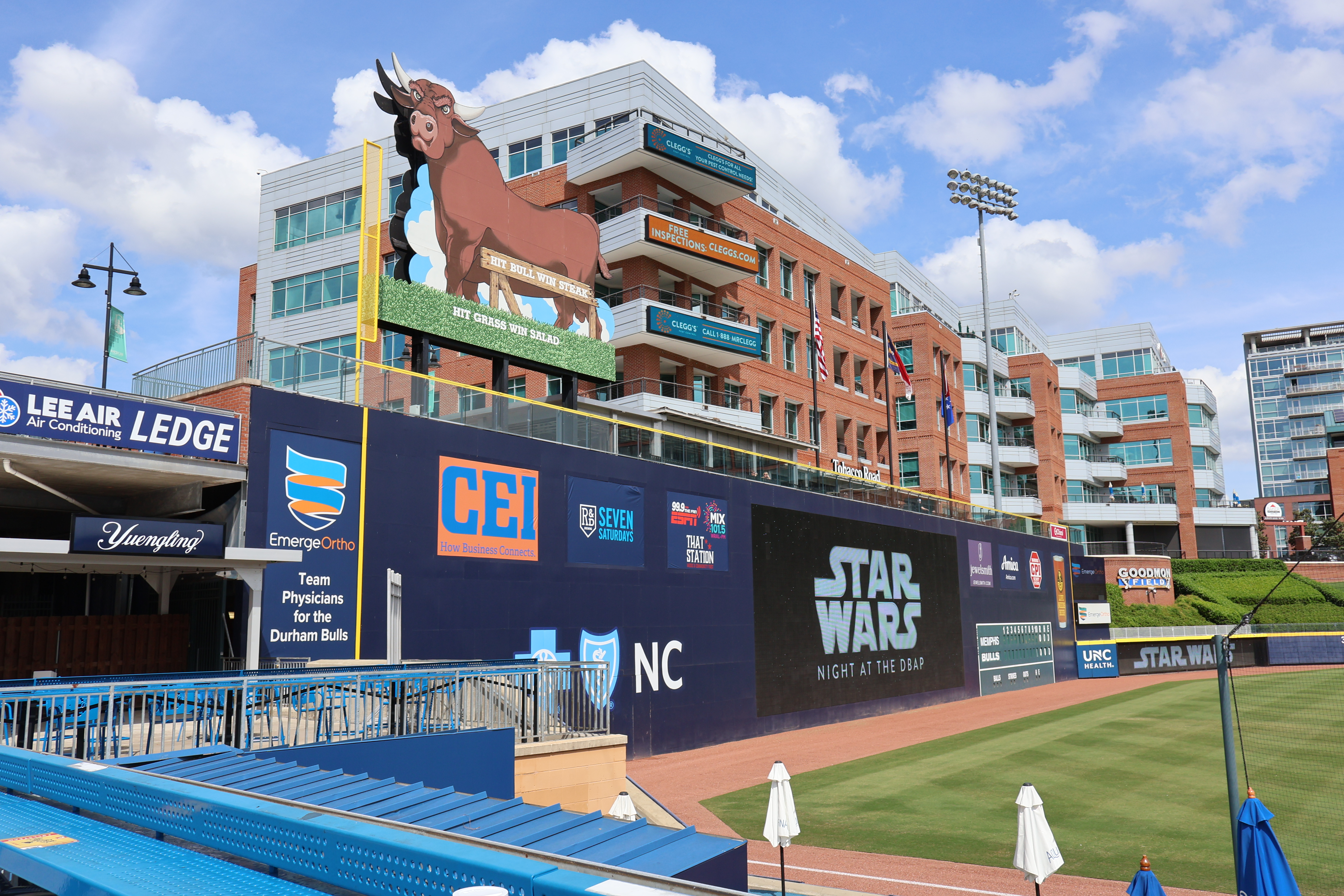
View of the Blue Monster at Durham Bulls Athletic Park in 2023

- Durham Bulls Athletic Park, home of the Durham Bulls, Triple-A affiliate of the Tampa Bay Rays, has a 32-foot (9.8 m) wall in left field named the "Blue Monster".
- Fluor Field at the West End, home of the Red Sox High-A affiliate, the Greenville Drive, has a "Greenville Monster" in left field.
- Hadlock Field, home of the Red Sox Double-A affiliate, the Portland Sea Dogs, boasts a replica of the Green Monster, nicknamed the "Maine Monster".
- HomeTrust Park, home of the Asheville Tourists, the High-A affiliate of the Houston Astros, has a 36-foot-high (11 m) right field wall.

=== Independent baseball ===
- Ogren Park at Allegiance Field, home of the Missoula PaddleHeads of the independent Pioneer League, has a 27-foot-high (8.2 m) in right field, located 287 feet (87 m) from home plate as measured along the foul line. The park has a similar wall that is 309 feet (94 m) from home plate, but not as tall.
- WellSpan Park, home of the York Revolution of the Atlantic League of Professional Baseball, has "The Arch Nemesis" that is 6 inches (15 cm) taller than the Green Monster.

=== Collegiate baseball ===
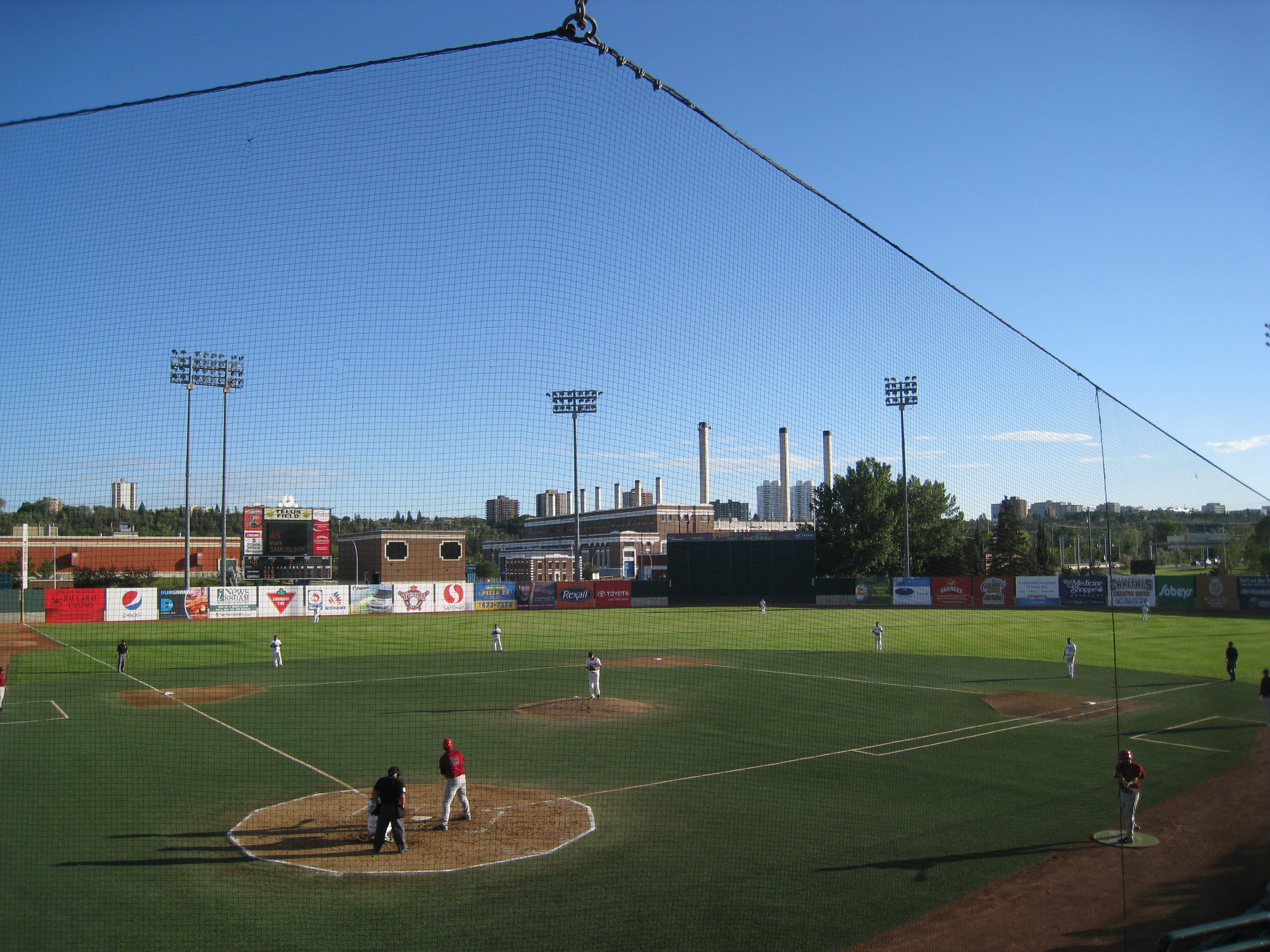
View of RE/MAX Field in 2010 (when it was known as Telus Field) with its large center-field wall

- Bush Field, home of the Yale Bulldogs baseball program and former ballpark of the Double-A New Haven Ravens, features a 35-foot-high (11 m) green metal wall in center field, which not only features a manual scoreboard, but also displays balls, strikes and outs with colored lights, just like Fenway's Green Monster.
- Hawkins Field, home of the Vanderbilt Commodores baseball program, features a 35-foot (11 m) version of the Green Monster, with a scoreboard on top.
- George C. Page Stadium, home field for the Loyola Marymount Lions baseball program, features a "Blue Monster" in left field that is 37 feet (11 m) tall.
- RE/MAX Field, home of the Edmonton Riverhawks of collegiate summer baseball, has a 34-foot-high (10 m) wall located 420 feet (130 m) from home plate.

=== Elsewhere ===
- Fukuoka Dome, home of the Fukuoka SoftBank Hawks of Nippon Professional Baseball, has a 5.84-metre-high (19.2 ft) "Green Monster" in the outfield.
- JetBlue Park in Fort Myers, Florida, current spring training home of the Red Sox, features a replica of the Green Monster. It is not, however, an exact replica as JetBlue's left field wall has seating both inside the wall ("mid-Monster") and on top of the wall. Adding the in-wall seating allows the park to have a Green Monster replica which complies with Florida's hurricane-influenced building codes. The first level of seating is at a height of 23 feet (7.0 m) while the upper level of seating is at 42 feet 11 inches (13.08 m). The mid-Monster seats are protected by a net, with baseballs hit off the net considered to still be in play.
- The John F. Fitzgerald Expressway, part of Interstate 93 through downtown Boston, was for many years an elevated expressway held up with green girders, which was derided as "Boston's other Green Monster".
