= Brooks Robinson =

American baseball player (1937–2023)

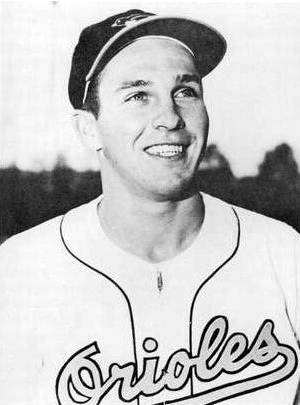
- Robinson in 1959
- Third baseman
- Born: May 18, 1937; Little Rock, Arkansas, U.S.
- Died: September 26, 2023 (aged 86); Owings Mills, Maryland, U.S.
- Batted: Right Threw: Right

MLB debut
- September 17, 1955, for the Baltimore Orioles

Last MLB appearance
- August 13, 1977, for the Baltimore Orioles

MLB statistics
- Batting average: .267
- Hits: 2,848
- Home runs: 268
- Runs batted in: 1,357
- Stats at Baseball Reference

Teams
- Baltimore Orioles (1955–1977)

Career highlights and awards
- 18× All-Star (1960–1974); 2× World Series champion (1966, 1970); AL MVP (1964); World Series MVP (1970); 16× Gold Glove Award (1960–1975); Roberto Clemente Award (1972); AL RBI leader (1964); Baltimore Orioles No. 5 retired; Baltimore Orioles Hall of Fame; Major League Baseball All-Century Team

Member of the National

Baseball Hall of Fame
- Induction: 1983
- Vote: 92.0% (first ballot)

Brooks Calbert Robinson Jr. (May 18, 1937 – September 26, 2023) was an American professional baseball player who played his entire 23-year career in Major League Baseball (MLB) as a third baseman for the Baltimore Orioles from 1955 to 1977. Nicknamed "Mr. Hoover" and "the Human Vacuum Cleaner", he is generally considered to have been the greatest defensive third baseman in major league history.

An 18-time All-Star, he won 16 consecutive Gold Glove Awards, the most by a position player, and tied with Jim Kaat for the second-most of all time, behind Greg Maddux. His 2,870 career games at third base not only exceeded the closest player by nearly 700 games when he retired, but also remain the most games by any player in major league history at a single position. His 23 seasons spent with a single team set a major league record since matched only by Carl Yastrzemski.

Joining the Orioles as a teenager in 1955, Robinson became the centerpiece of the team as they posted the best record in the major leagues between 1965 and 1974, capturing four American League (AL) pennants and two World Series titles. Beloved in Baltimore, Robinson was known as "Mr. Oriole" by the team's fans. He was named the AL Most Valuable Player (MVP) in 1964 after posting career highs with a .317 batting average, 28 home runs, and 118 runs batted in (RBIs), leading the AL in the last category. In 1966, he finished second in the MVP voting behind teammate Frank Robinson after again posting 100 RBIs as the Orioles won the pennant, before sweeping the Los Angeles Dodgers for the team's first Series title.

In the 1970 World Series against the Cincinnati Reds, Robinson drew wide attention with his strong defensive play, time after time robbing Cincinnati players of base hits, and drove in runs in the first four games; his performance won him the World Series MVP Award as Baltimore defeated the Reds in five games. In 1971 he became one of just 12 players to earn over $100,000 annually. Robinson led AL third basemen in fielding percentage eleven times and in assists eight times, both major league records, and in putouts and double plays three times each. He still holds major league records for career putouts (2,697), assists (6,205), total chances (9,165), and double plays (618) at third base, with each total being between 13% and 20% higher than the closest player. His career fielding percentage of .971 was a major league record until 2006, and remains the top AL mark.

Upon his retirement during the 1977 season, his 2,896 games and 10,654 at bats each ranked fifth in major league history, behind only Ty Cobb among AL players, and his 2,848 hits ranked seventh in AL history. From 1969 to 1980, he held the AL record for career home runs by a third baseman. He set franchise records for career games, at bats, hits, runs (1,232), RBIs (1,357), doubles (482), total bases (4,270), and home runs by a right-handed hitter (268), all of which were later broken by Cal Ripken Jr. Robinson was elected to the Baseball Hall of Fame in 1983 in his first year of eligibility, a first for third basemen. Following his playing career, he served as a broadcaster for the Orioles and also joined Opening Day Partners, who own several minor league teams. Robinson remained popular with Oriole fans for his kindness and patience with them. "Never has a player meant more to a franchise and more to a city than Brooks has meant to the Orioles and the city of Baltimore," said Oriole historian Ted Patterson.

== Early life ==
Brooks Calbert Robinson was born on May 18, 1937, in Little Rock, Arkansas, to Brooks Calbert Sr. and Ethel Mae (née Denker) Robinson. His father worked for Colonial Bakery in Little Rock and later became a captain with the Little Rock Fire Department. Meanwhile, his mother worked for Sears Roebuck & Company before accepting a position with the state controller's office. Young Robinson drew a salary himself from delivering the Arkansas Gazette on his bicycle, as well as operating the scoreboard and selling soft drinks at Lamar Porter Field.

Robinson Sr. played second base for a semi-pro baseball team. He would play the game with his son during Robinson's younger years. Growing up, Robinson rooted for the St. Louis Cardinals; Stan Musial was his favorite player. In high school, he played American Legion Baseball for the M. M. Eberts Post No. 1 Doughboys, among the greatest American Legion teams in that part of the country. The team reached the regional finals in 1952, when Robinson was 15. They then advanced to the sectional tournament in 1953. Robinson graduated from Little Rock Central High School on May 27, 1955, impressing the University of Arkansas enough with his basketball ability that the school offered him a full scholarship. However, Robinson desired to become a professional baseball player. Lindsay Deal, who went to Capitol View Methodist Church with Robinson, had been a teammate of Baltimore Orioles manager Paul Richards on a minor league team, and he wrote a letter to Richards praising Robinson's ability. "He's no speed demon, but neither is he a truck horse," Deal wrote. "Brooks has a lot of power, baseball savvy, and is always cool when the chips are down." In 1955, three major league teams sent scouts to Little Rock to try to sign Robinson: the New York Giants, the Cincinnati Redlegs, and the Orioles. Each offered $4,000, but only Cincinnati and Baltimore were offering major league contracts. Robinson ultimately chose to sign with Baltimore because the Orioles had shown the most interest and had the most opportunities for young players to become everyday players on their roster. Art Ehlers was the scout who signed him.

== Baltimore Orioles ==
=== Early years (1955–1959) ===
Playing second base, Brooks Robinson made his professional debut on June 3, 1955, at Bob Hoffman Stadium with the York White Roses. After three months in York, Pennsylvania, he made his first appearance with the Orioles on September 17, 1955, at Memorial Stadium against the Washington Senators, batting sixth in the lineup. He had two hits in four at bats, singling in the fourth inning against Chuck Stobbs for his first hit before driving in a run on a single in the eighth inning in a 3–1 win. After that, he went hitless in his next 18 at bats before sitting for the season's final two games. "Those American League pitchers made me look like just what I was—a young, green, immature eighteen-year-old who'd been lucky that first day against Washington," he later reflected. After the season, the Orioles assigned him to the Willard Blues, a Colombian winter league team where Baltimore sent some of its best prospects. Earl Wilson hit Robinson in the head with a pitch in one of the games, but Robinson was protected from severe injury because of a new fiberglass batting helmet the team was testing on their players.

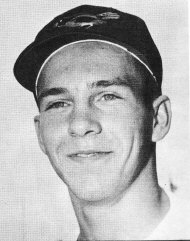
Robinson in 1955

In 1956, Robinson was allowed to stay in spring training with the Orioles until March 21, but Baltimore acquired Bobby Adams to play third base, thinking the 18-year-old Robinson was not quite ready for the major leagues. He spent most of the year with the Class AA San Antonio Missions, where he tore cartilage in his right knee while sliding into a base in August. The injury was initially feared to require surgery, but rest and heat reduced the swelling, and he missed only a few games. Promoted to Baltimore after the minor league season, he appeared in 15 games, demonstrating fielding ability beyond his years, though only batting .227.

Robinson competed with future Hall of Famer George Kell to be Baltimore's everyday third baseman in 1957, though Kell happily mentored the younger player. Both made the starting lineup (Robinson at third base, Kell at first), but two weeks into the season, Robinson completely tore the cartilage in his knee while swerving to avoid a tag at first base. He missed all of May and spent most of June on a rehab assignment in San Antonio but regained the starting job when he returned. On August 2, he was again hit in the head with a pitch, this time by Ned Garver. The errant throw resulted in a mild concussion and a wound above Robinson's left eye that required 10 stitches, but after five days, the ballplayer was ready to perform again. On August 14, he hit his first major league home run off Pedro Ramos. In 50 games, he batted .239. Because of the time he had missed, the Orioles had him play winter baseball again to continue his development. This time in Havana, he led the league with nine home runs.

When the Orioles played the New York Yankees in late April 1958, Yogi Berra said that Robinson "got a great future" after the third baseman dove to catch a Gil McDougald ground ball, stood up, and threw out Berra trying to score. Offensively, Robinson batted .406 through April. Toward midseason, he developed a hitch in his swing and started hitting too many pop flies, which caused him to lose playing time to Dick Williams in August. He helped Hoyt Wilhelm throw a no-hitter on September 28 by making three terrific fielding plays after replacing Williams at third base in the eighth inning. "There weren't too many bright spots in my 1958 season, but being in on Wilhelm's no-hitter was the big one for me," Robinson recalled. In 145 games, he batted .238 with three home runs in 463 at bats---weak offensive numbers, but his defense was more impressive. "I think Brooks is in a class by himself as a defensive third baseman," said Oriole manager Paul Richards.

Following the 1958 season, Robinson enlisted in the Arkansas Army National Guard for four years; he served six months on active duty, then three and a half years in reserve status, which ensured he would not be drafted for two years of continuous active duty. He qualified as a repair parts specialist in the Ordnance Corps and was assigned to Company A, 739th Ordnance Battalion. Robinson received his honorable discharge in January 1962. Army training kept him physically fit, but not in optimal condition for baseball, and shortly after the 1959 season started, Robinson was sent to the Vancouver Mounties of the Class AAA Pacific Coast League. On May 17, he had a terrifying moment when, as he fell into a Capilano Stadium dugout to catch a ball, he caught his right biceps on a hook, tearing tendons and causing severe bleeding; team trainer Doc Younker assisted Robinson in getting him loose from the hook and to the hospital. The injury just missed tearing a nerve, which would have ended his career, but he had to miss only 25 games. Fulfilling a promise he made when he demoted Robinson, Richards recalled him before the season's first All-Star Game. The time in the minors had helped his hitting; biographer Doug Wilson wrote that "He was no longer overmatched by big league pitchers." He batted .284 in 88 games, and Richards said that he was "the best player in the American League [for] the last five weeks of the season."

=== Everyday player, MVP (1960–1965) ===
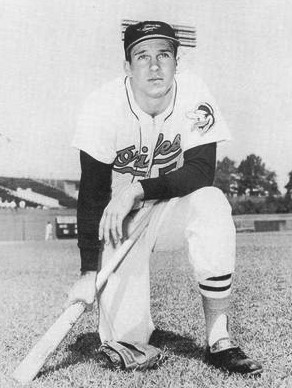
Robinson in 1963

By 1960, Robinson was unquestionably the Oriole third baseman. He started the year in the sixth slot in the batting lineup but ascended to third after batting .333 in June and .351 in July. In July, he was selected to his first of 18 straight All-Star Games; he would be a part of both games from 1960 to 1962, in which two games a year were played. On July 15, he recorded five hits in five at bats, becoming the first Oriole to hit for the cycle in a 5–2 victory over the Chicago White Sox. For the first time since their arrival in Baltimore, the Orioles were contenders for the AL pennant, part of a three-way race with the Yankees and the White Sox as September arrived. In the first game of an early September series against the Yankees in Baltimore, Robinson had the first RBI, then fielded a ball hit off of Milt Pappas's leg in the ninth and threw out Héctor López at first base. He drove in the only runs in the second game, in which the Orioles took over first place in the AL on September 3. Baltimore swept the series, but a fever briefly hospitalized Robinson at the end of the series, and he went into a batting slump. After getting swept in a four-game series against New York later in the month, Baltimore finished in second. In 152 games, Robinson batted .294 and hit 14 home runs. He finished third in AL Most Valuable Player (MVP) voting (behind Roger Maris and Mickey Mantle), was named the Most Valuable Oriole by sportscasters and sportswriters around Baltimore, and won his first of 16 consecutive Gold Glove Awards at third base.

For most of 1961, Robinson batted first in Baltimore's lineup. He further solidified his defensive reputation in 1961; sportswriter Bob Addie reported, "The 'young old-timers' in the press box are beginning to compare Baltimore's Brooks Robinson with the great third basemen of the past." One of two players in the AL to appear in every game of the season, he batted .287 with 192 hits (second in the league only to Norm Cash's 193) and seven home runs.

After two straight second-place finishes, the Orioles slumped to seventh place in the league in 1962, but Robinson had another fine year. In consecutive games on May 6 and 9, Robinson hit a grand slam, one of six major leaguers ever to have done so at the time. In August, he had eight straight hits over a three-game span. Sports Illustrated proclaimed him "the best third baseman in the league." He batted higher than .300 for the first time (.303) and topped 20 home runs (23), recording 86 RBIs as he was named the Most Valuable Oriole for the second time. Robinson got off to an excellent start offensively to the 1963 season, and had hits in both of his at bats in that year's All-Star Game. Overall, his offensive production diminished, as he batted just .219 after the All-Star break, and saw a streak of 462 consecutive games played come to an end when manager Billy Hitchcock benched him in an attempt to improve his hitting. For the year, he batted .251 with 11 home runs and 67 RBI.

Robinson spent extra time in 1964 spring training practicing offense with hitting coach Gene Woodling. The coach encouraged Robinson to stop swinging at bad pitches, and Robinson started using a slightly heavier bat. Against the Yankees early in the year, he made what Wilson said "was generally agreed to be the play of the year," diving to stop a hard-hit ground ball off the bat of Bobby Richardson and throwing him out while still seated on the ground. With the Orioles, Yankees, and White Sox in a three-way race for the pennant, Robinson batted .464 with 28 RBIs from September 7 through the end of the season, though the Orioles again finished behind the Yankees. The Orioles honored him with a "Brooks Robinson Night" late in the season, which the ballplayer said "will always remain one of the great moments of my life." Maxwell Kates of the Society for American Baseball Research said "Robinson had perhaps his best season in 1964." Playing all but two innings of Baltimore's 163-game season, Robinson hit for a .317 batting average with 28 home runs. He led the league with 118 RBI, winning the AL MVP Award. For much of 1965, Robinson batted over .300 again, though his average fell to .297 by the end of the year. He led Baltimore in batting average and RBIs (80).

=== World Series champion (1966–1971) ===
==== 1966–1970 ====
During the 1965–66 offseason, the Orioles acquired former National League (NL) MVP Frank Robinson from the Cincinnati Reds; Frank would bat third in the lineup, right in front of Brooks. Halfway through the year, Brooks had 70 RBIs. In the All-Star Game, played in 106 °F (41 °C) conditions, he made several outstanding defensive plays and recorded three hits, and was the game's MVP even though the AL lost 2–1. Over 28 games in August, he struggled, batting .187 with just three RBIs. The Orioles nonetheless won the AL pennant for the first time in Robinson's tenure with the team, clinching on Sep 15. In 157 games, Robinson batted .269 with 23 home runs and 100 RBIs, his second and final season with at least 100 RBIs. He finished second to Frank, that year's Triple Crown winner, in the AL MVP voting; teammate Boog Powell came in third.

Against the Los Angeles Dodgers in the World Series, Frank and Brooks hit back-to-back home runs off of Don Drysdale in Game 1, a 5–2 victory. "Drysdale's second pitch to me was a high fast ball, and I parked it in almost the same seats in the left field pavilion [that Frank had hit his to]," Robinson recalled. In Game 4, the Orioles nursed a 1–0 lead in the fifth inning when Jim Lefebvre led off with a single. The next batter, Wes Parker, hit a ground ball that Robinson had to stretch to catch. After stumbling, Robinson threw the ball to second baseman Davey Johnson, who threw out Parker at first base to complete a double play. The score remained 1–0 through the end of the game, and the Orioles completed a four-game sweep of the Dodgers for Baltimore's first World Series championship. A picture of Robinson leaping into the air as he ran to the pitcher's mound to congratulate Dave McNally after the game remains one of the most iconic Oriole photos. After the season, he and multiple other baseball celebrities went on a tour to visit US troops serving in the Vietnam War.

In 1967 spring training, Phil Niekro hit Robinson in the head with a pitch, causing a mild concussion. Robinson slumped early in the year but improved toward the end of June, posting 17 hits over 39 at bats in one 10-game stretch, including five home runs. His home run in the All-Star Game was the only run for the AL in a 2–1, 15-inning loss. On August 6, he hit into a triple play for the fourth time in his career, a major league record. "I wouldn't mind seeing someone erase my record of hitting into four triple plays," he said. Toward the end of the year, he went hitless in 49 of 51 at bats. In 158 games, he batted .269 with 22 home runs and 77 RBIs. He played all 162 games for the Orioles in 1968, batting .253 with 17 home runs and 75 RBIs. Robinson also ended the season with 405 assists, tying the major league record set by Harlond Clift in 1937; Graig Nettles broke the record with 412 assists in 1971.

Through May 1969, Robinson batted .216, only raising his average to .234 by the end of the year. Manager Earl Weaver attributed his struggles to swinging at bad pitches, as well as his slow pace, which prevented him from getting as many infield hits. On May 28 in a 9–5 road win against the Seattle Pilots, he hit his 179th career home run as a third baseman, breaking Clift's AL record. Robinson hit .234 with 23 home runs and 84 RBI, and the Orioles won the newly created AL East division to advance to the postseason.

In Game 1 of the AL Championship Series (ALCS) versus the Minnesota Twins, Robinson had four hits in Baltimore's 4–3 win. He gloved a hard-hit line drive off the bat of Rod Carew in Game 3, an 11–2 victory that clinched the Orioles a trip to the World Series to face the New York Mets. During the first game of the World Series, Rod Gaspar hit a slow, bouncer toward third that both Gaspar and pitcher Mike Cuellar thought would be a hit; Robinson caught it barehanded and threw to first before he had fully stood up, retiring Gaspar as the Orioles went on to win 4–1. He made a similar play to keep Jerry Grote from getting a hit in Game 2 and had an RBI single against Jerry Koosman, but Baltimore lost 2–1. With the Orioles trailing the Mets 1–0 in the ninth inning of Game 4, Robinson batted against Tom Seaver with runners on first and third and one out. He sent the ball towards right field but was robbed of a hit when Ron Swoboda made a diving catch; Biographer Doug Wilson, mentioned earlier in this article, wrote that the catch "is one of the all-time great plays in World Series history." Baltimore lost 2–1 in 10 innings, then went on to lose the series in five games.

Robinson started using a heavier bat in 1970, as he batted .311 in April. On May 9, he hit his 200th home run. His 2,000th hit came on June 20, a three-run home run that provided the margin of victory in a game against the Washington Senators. Against the Boston Red Sox on September 4, he recorded five hits, two home runs, and four RBIs in an 8–6 victory. On September 8 in a 6–3 road win against the Detroit Tigers, he broke Eddie Yost's American League record of 2,008 games at third base. In the first game of a doubleheader against the Senators on September 29, he had his 1,000th career RBIs against Joe Coleman, who had also allowed his 200th home run. Robinson had his highest batting average (.276) and RBIs (94) totals since 1966, adding 18 home runs as the Orioles again won the AL East.

==== 1970 postseason ====
In the ALCS, against the Twins, Robinson batted .583 with three runs scored and two RBIs as Baltimore completed the sweep, sending them to the World Series against the Cincinnati Reds. With Game 1 of the World Series tied at 3–3 in the sixth inning, Lee May hit a one-hop ball fair past third. Playing behind the base, Robinson lunged, backhanded the ball, spun 180 degrees, and made a one-hop toss to first that narrowly beat May to the bag. Years later, Jayson Stark of ESPN considered this the third-greatest play of all time. Against Gary Nolan in the seventh inning, Robinson's solo home run provided the winning margin in Baltimore's 4–3 triumph. As it turned out, these were just the first of many fine plays Robinson would make during the Series.

During Game 2, Robinson darted into the gap between him and shortstop Mark Belanger to field a ground ball hit by Bobby Tolan in the first inning. Throwing sidearm to second, he forced out Pete Rose. Then, in the third inning, he snagged a hard line drive off May's bat, whirling and throwing almost immediately to second for a double play that ended the inning. Baltimore won the game 6–5. Robinson made an over-the-head catch of a bouncing ball off of Tony Pérez's bat in the first inning of Game 3, outracing Rose to third base and throwing to first to complete a double play. Fielding a slow grounder hit by Tommy Helms in the second inning, Robinson partially circled the ball before picking it up, allowing him to throw to first on a better angle. He dove to his left to rob Johnny Bench of a hit in the sixth inning, barely holding onto a hard line drive. Offensively, he had two RBIs in Baltimore's 9–3 win. In Game 4, he had four hits and a home run, though Baltimore lost 6–5. Finally, in Game 5, he made a diving back-handed catch of a line drive off of Bench's bat in the ninth, and fielded Pat Corrales' ground ball for the final out, as Baltimore won the game 9–3 to clinch their second World Series victory.

Though Robinson batted .429 with two home runs in the series, his defensive prowess was what really stood out, as he started two double plays and fielded 23 chances while making several outstanding plays. His performance won him the World Series MVP Award. During the Series, Reds manager Sparky Anderson quipped, "I'm beginning to see Brooks in my sleep. If I dropped this paper plate, he'd pick it up on one hop and throw me out at first." "I've never seen anything like him in my life," Rose said. "He has to be the greatest third baseman of all time," said Pérez, who played the same position. "I just enjoy watching him play. He's in the right place every time." Wilson wrote that Robinson's outstanding play in the series, which was televised nationally, helped his ability to be appreciated by baseball fans outside the Baltimore area. After the season, he won the Hickok Belt, presented annually to the top professional athlete of the year.

==== 1971 ====
Before the 1971 season, Robinson signed a $100,000 contract, becoming only one of 12 players with such a high baseball salary at the time. He played 50 games in a row without committing an error and received the most votes of AL players in the All-Star Game. On July 28, he uncharacteristically made three errors in a game, though Baltimore still won 3–2. Wilson pointed out, "men had literally walked on the moon before Brooks Robinson had made three errors in a game." On the final day of the season, he broke Eddie Mathews' major league record of 2,181 games at third base, with his 2nd-inning home run providing the only scoring in a 1–0 victory over the Red Sox. In 156 games, he batted .272, hitting 20 home runs and driving in 92 runs as he finished fourth in AL MVP voting.

For the third year in a row, the Orioles won the AL East. In Game 2 of the ALCS against the Athletics, Robinson hit a home run against Catfish Hunter. He had two RBIs in Game 3 and batted .364 in the series as Baltimore swept the Athletics, advancing them to the World Series where they would face the Pittsburgh Pirates. In Game 2, Robinson had three RBIs and reached base safely five times, joining Babe Ruth and Lou Brock as the only other players to do so in a World Series game. During the eighth inning, he landed on his chest after diving for a bouncing ball off the bat of Manny Sanguillén, but he stood up in time to throw the runner out. Baltimore won 11–3. After the Pirates got two baserunners in the first inning of Game 3, Robinson snagged a hard line drive off the bat of Bob Robertson, throwing to second for a double play. Baltimore would lose that game 5–1. With the Orioles facing elimination in Game 6, Robinson hit a 10th-inning sacrifice fly against Bob Miller that scored the winning run in a 3–2 victory. He batted .318 in the series and tied with other Orioles and Pirates for the most RBIs in the series (five), but Pittsburgh defeated the Orioles in seven games.

=== Later years (1972–1977) ===
Robinson served as the Major League Baseball Players Association player's representative for much of his career with the Orioles. In 1972, he and Belanger were among the 47 who voted in favor of the 1972 Major League Baseball strike. "I want to play," Robinson told reporters. "All players do. It all boils down to whether the owners are willing to make some concessions. I think our fellows are willing to make some, too, and that seems to be the best chance." The strike only wound up cancelling games on 10 days of the 1972 season, but Robinson was booed in his first at bat of the year at Memorial Stadium.

In 153 games in 1972, Robinson batted .250. His eight home runs and 64 RBIs were his lowest totals in those categories since 1961. During the season, he criticized Weaver publicly when Weaver suggested that some of the Oriole veterans were getting too old to play. "I find the remark embarrassing," Robinson said. "I don't enjoy going places to hear people say I'm over the hill, or know that they're thinking it." He recognized that Weaver was a great manager, however, and observed a couple years later that "Rarely have I questioned his action." Robinson still won the Commissioner's Award, presented annually to the individual who best represented baseball as a player and as a person.

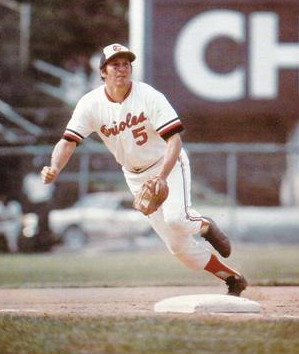
Robinson during his final season

Robinson hit two home runs on Opening Day in 1973, but his batting average was under .200 by the middle of June. He still made the All-Star Game, but sportswriters observed that his selection had more to do with popularity than it did with his performance that season. On May 4, he had his 2,417th career hit, breaking Pie Traynor's record for most hits by a third baseman. Defensively, he started two 5–4–3 triple plays – on July 7 against the Athletics, and on September 20 against the Tigers. On August 20, he got his 2,500th hit against the Twins, a 9th-inning RBI single to tie the game, with the Orioles going on to win 4–3. In the season's final 2 1/2 months, he batted nearly .300. He played 155 games, batting .257 with nine home runs and 72 RBIs as the Orioles returned to the playoffs after a one-year absence. In the ALCS against Oakland, he batted .250 with a run scored and two RBIs as the Athletics defeated Baltimore in five games.

Though Robinson made more errors than usual in 1974, he was batting .311 at the All-Star break. In the second-to-last game of the year, Robinson scored from first on a pinch-hit double by Andy Etchebarren. The run provided the margin of victory in a game that, coupled with a Yankee loss later that day, clinched the Orioles' AL East championship. Robinson batted .288 with seven home runs. His batting average was the best it had been since 1965, though his RBIs were his lowest since 1959. Oriole historian Ted Patterson wrote that 1974 was "his last solid season." The Orioles again faced the Athletics in the ALCS; in Game 1, Robinson dove to catch a ball hit by Dick Green, then threw him out at first, adding a solo home run in Baltimore's 6–1 win. He would bat just .083 in the series, which Oakland won in four games.

Plagued by a sore thumb and declining ability in 1975, Robinson missed the All-Star Game for the first time since 1960. His batting average was .159 at one point, and on July 7, a pinch-hitter was substituted for him for the first time since 1958. In 144 games, he batted .201 with six home runs and 53 RBI. On the bright side, he led AL third basemen in fielding percentage for the 11th time.

The Orioles had a young third base prospect named Doug DeCinces, and on May 17, 1976, Weaver informed Robinson that DeCinces would be taking over his position; though still a fine fielder, Robinson was only batting .165. Robinson requested a trade to a team that would give him more playing time and was nearly sent to the White Sox, but he vetoed the deal because Chicago did not want to give him a contract through 1978. In 71 games, he batted .211 with three home runs and 11 RBI.

1977 would be his final season; his playing time was infrequent. "Brooks' last great moment," according to Patterson, came against the Indians on April 19, when he pinch-hit in the bottom of the 10th inning of a game against the Indians which Baltimore trailed 5–3. There were two men on base, and after working the count full and fouling off several pitches, Robinson hit a walkoff home run against Dave LaRoche for a 6–5 Oriole win. He made his final batting appearance on August 5 at Anaheim Stadium, pinch hitting for Belanger in the top of the eighth inning and lining out. However, he would play briefly in one more game, eight days later at Memorial Stadium against the Athletics. He entered as a pinch hitter for Al Bumbry against the left-handed Bob Lacey. When Oakland manager Bobby Winkles replaced Lacey with right-hander Doug Bair, Weaver replaced Robinson with left-handed Tony Muser before the at bat even started. With the Orioles needing another roster spot when Rick Dempsey returned from the disabled list, Robinson announced his retirement as an active player on August 21, with more than a month to go in the season. He was given a standing ovation by the fans at Metropolitan Stadium prior to that afternoon's 9–5 loss to the Minnesota Twins. He was honored a month later with an hour-long ceremony before a 10–4 defeat to the Boston Red Sox on September 18 before a crowd of 51,798, then the largest attendance for an Orioles home regular-season game.

== Career statistics ==
A fine eye at the plate, Robinson batted .267 in his 23-year career, accumulating 2,848 hits, 268 home runs, and 1,357 RBI and struck out only 1,164 times in 10,654 times at bat. In 39 postseason games, he batted .303 with 5 home runs and 22 RBI. Defensively, Robinson set an AL record by leading the league in fielding percentage for 11 seasons. His career fielding percentage of .971 was higher than that of any other third baseman when he retired. Other third baseman's records he holds include most games played at the position (2,870), most putouts (2,697), most assists (6,205), most total chances (9,165), and most double plays (618).

Prior to Robinson, no other player in Major League history had spent as many as 23 seasons exclusively with one ballclub; the only player to do so since is Carl Yastrzemski. Robinson reached 18 straight All-Star Games (1960–74) and participated in the World Series four times. His AL record of 266 career home runs as a third baseman was broken by Graig Nettles in 1980.

| Category | G | BA | AB | R | H | 2B | 3B | HR | RBI | SB | CS | BB | SO | OBP | SLG | OPS | PO | A | DP | E | FLD% | Ref. |
|---|---|---|---|---|---|---|---|---|---|---|---|---|---|---|---|---|---|---|---|---|---|---|
| Total | 2,896 | .267 | 10,654 | 1,232 | 2,848 | 482 | 68 | 268 | 1,357 | 28 | 22 | 860 | 990 | .322 | .401 | .723 | 2,712 | 6,205 | 621 | 264 | .971 | |

== Player profile ==
Robinson was very animated while waiting to hit. He would grab the top of his helmet, swing his bat with his left hand, and rock forwards and backwards before pitches. Though he was not a fast baserunner, he would swing his arms as he ran the bases, emphasizing the fact that he was running as fast as he could. As a hitter, Robinson's trademark was his custom-made batting helmet with a 1-inch bill that was much shorter than the standard. He would use a hacksaw blade to shorten the bill to keep it from distracting him at the plate.

His strong defensive play caused him to be nicknamed the "Human Vacuum Cleaner" and "Mr. Hoover," as he was so skilled at catching balls hit towards third base. As a fielder, he was always on the move, not typical for third basemen of the time. His arm did not appear to be one of baseball's strongest partly because he was so quick at letting go of the ball. Instead of cocking his arm back before throwing, he would transfer the ball from his glove to his hand and fire it "in one seamless motion," according to Wilson. He had a knack for knowing which play to make, and he was well known for running towards the plate to field bunts or other slow ground balls. "He didn't have a typical athletic body, he was kind of slump-shouldered, not a real muscular guy, and he didn't appear to have a strong arm," said teammate Chuck Estrada. "But then watching him play, you found out that none of that mattered, because he had great hands, a quick release, and the runner was always out." Robinson's 16 Gold Glove awards at third base are tied with pitcher Jim Kaat for the second most won by any player, behind only pitching great Greg Maddux's 18.

Jim Murray of The Los Angeles Times wrote during Robinson's career that "In the future, Brooks Robinson will be the standard every third baseman will be measured by"; writing 40 years later, Wilson said "That statement has withstood the test of time." Casey Stengel and Home Run Baker, each of whom was involved in the game of baseball for over 50 years, both agreed that Robinson was the greatest third baseman they ever witnessed. Harold 'Pie' Traynor, the Pittsburgh Pirates' hall of fame third baseman to whom Robinson was often compared, said, "I once thought of giving him some tips, but dropped the idea. He's just the best there is." Umpire Ed Hurley said, "He came down from a higher league."

Robinson was very particular about his glove. He would try the gloves of different players and trade two of his own for theirs if he really wanted it. Once he found one he liked, he would take a year to prepare it. When he felt it was ready for game action, he would use it exclusively during games, using others for batting practice and infield workouts. He was also picky about his bat, though he would use different ones from game to game, sampling those of his teammates and even opposing players before he found one he wanted to utilize.

Aside from his playing ability, Robinson endeared himself to the Orioles fans because of his personality. "Other stars had fans," goes a quote in Patterson's book. "Robby made friends." He treated them with patience and kindness while taking an interest in them as well. “When fans ask Brooks Robinson for his autograph,” commented Oriole broadcaster Chuck Thompson, “he complied while finding out how many kids you have, what your dad does, where you live, how old you are, and if you have a dog. ... His only failing is that when the game ended, if Brooks belonged to its story – usually he did – you better leave the booth at the end of the eighth inning. ... By the time the press got [to the clubhouse] Brooks was in the parking lot signing autographs on his way home." "Never has a player meant more to a franchise and more to a city than Brooks has meant to the Orioles and the city of Baltimore," wrote Patterson.

== Off-the-field occupations, post-retirement ==
In 1961, Robinson became the part owner of Brooks and Eddie Robinson's Gorsuch House restaurant, located near Memorial Stadium. He started Brooks Robinson Sporting Goods in 1963; the company did a great deal of wholesale business with Baltimore-area teams. By the 1970s, they had established multiple locations in the Baltimore area. They briefly supplied uniforms for the Orioles, then later outfitted the short-lived Baltimore Claws of the American Basketball Association. In 1974, the company took out a loan to expand to York, Pennsylvania, but delays in construction of the new store ran the company into debt, forcing it to cease operations shortly thereafter. A judge ordered Robinson's house to be sold in the fall of 1976 to pay the company's debt, but Robinson managed to keep the house by paying nearly $180,000 out of his personal savings. He became a spokesman for Crown Central Petroleum in 1968 and spent over 30 years working for them. After the sporting goods business failed, Robinson and Ron Shapiro founded Personal Management Associates, which managed money for athletes.

Following his retirement as a player, Brooks began serving as a color commentator for the Orioles' television broadcasts, travelling to around 50 road games for the Orioles and calling 10 home games as well. On March 1, 1982, WMAR-TV, the station that broadcast the Orioles games in Baltimore, was struck by the American Federation of Television and Radio Artists (AFTRA). All of the station's on-air talent, except one, went on strike. AFTRA and WMAR negotiated for several weeks without success, but when Robinson refused to cross the picket line at the start of the baseball season, the strike ended the next day. He continued to serve as a broadcaster until 1993, when he decided to spend more time focusing on his business pursuits. In 1982, Robinson helped found the Major League Baseball Players Alumni Association, an organization that helps retired players secure benefits, promotes youth baseball, raises money for charity, and helps retired players maintain contact with each other. He succeeded Jim Kaat as president of the organization in 1989, and remained president until February 2023, shortly before his death. He was succeeded by Jim Thome. The MLBPAA's Brooks Robinson Community Service Award is named in his honor.

Robinson became a part owner of Opening Day Partners, an organization which owns several minor league teams, in 2005. The group owns four teams in the Atlantic League of Professional Baseball, and Robinson played a significant role in establishing the York Revolution. Founded in York, Pennsylvania, in 2007, the team was York's first since 1969; Robinson himself had played minor league ball for the York White Roses in 1955. The team's stadium, WellSpan Park, is located at 5 Brooks Robinson Way, and the plaza at its entrance is named in his honor. In the 1980s and again in 2006, Robinson helped raise money to restore Lamar Porter Field in his hometown of Little Rock, where he had played baseball while growing up.

In 2015, Robinson auctioned off a slew of items from his career, including his 1970 Gold Glove and his 1966 World Series ring. The auction raised $1.44 million for the Constance & Brooks Robinson Charitable Foundation.

== Honors ==
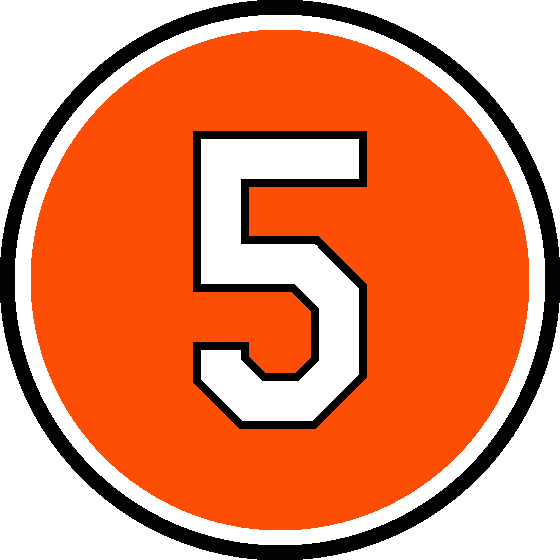
Brooks Robinson's number 5 was retired by the Baltimore Orioles in 1978.

Robinson's jersey number (5) was retired by the Orioles on April 14, 1978. In 1983, Robinson was elected to the Baseball Hall of Fame, one of 16 players to have been honored on the first ballot since the inaugural class of 1936. Coincidentally, Kell got in the same year. "It was unbelievable that two kids raised just 90 miles apart, and with the same churchgoing backgrounds and the same ideals, would go into the Hall of Fame the same day," Kell said. "You couldn't write the script any better."

Brooks and Frank were the first members of the Baltimore Orioles Hall of Fame in 1977, and Brooks was selected to the Arkansas Hall of Fame the following year. Robinson and former Baltimore Colts football player Johnny Unitas had plaques in their honor in the lobby of Memorial Stadium. When the Orioles played their last game there on October 6, 1991, Robinson and Unitas were invited to throw out the ceremonial first pitches. Robinson threw a baseball, while Unitas threw a football. After the game, Robinson led 119 former Oriole players in uniform out onto the field, where they took their old positions.

In 1999, Robinson ranked Number 80 on The Sporting News list of the 100 Greatest Baseball Players and was elected to the Major League Baseball All-Century Team. Fans elected Robinson to the All-Time Rawlings Gold Glove Team in 2008; Robinson accumulated the most votes of any player elected. In 2015, Robinson was selected as one of the Orioles Franchise Four, recognizing the four greatest living players in Orioles history, along with Jim Palmer, Frank Robinson, and Cal Ripken Jr. In 2020, The Athletic ranked him number 73 on the "Baseball 100" list complied sportswriter Joe Posnanski. That same year, he was the National Baseball Hall of Fame Recipient of the Bob Feller Act of Valor Award for his service in the Vietnam War.

Robinson has won several awards not specifically for baseball players as well. In 1984, he was presented the Golden Plate Award of the American Academy of Achievement. He was awarded the Silver Beaver Award by the Boy Scouts of America in 1990. Radio Tower Drive, a road in Pikesville, Maryland, was renamed Brooks Robinson Drive in honor of Robinson's 70th birthday on May 16, 2007.

Three statues of Robinson have been created. The first was placed in the Brooks Robinson Plaza outside WellSpan Park in York in 2008. On October 22, 2011, the second was unveiled on Washington Boulevard in downtown Baltimore. This statue depicted Robinson preparing to throw out a runner at first base. Present for the unveiling of the statue, Robinson commented that it "gave him more hair than he deserved." The Orioles unveiled a larger-than-life bronze sculpture of Robinson at Oriole Park at Camden Yards on September 29, 2012, as part of the Orioles Legends Celebration Series during the 20th anniversary of the ballpark.

== Personal life ==
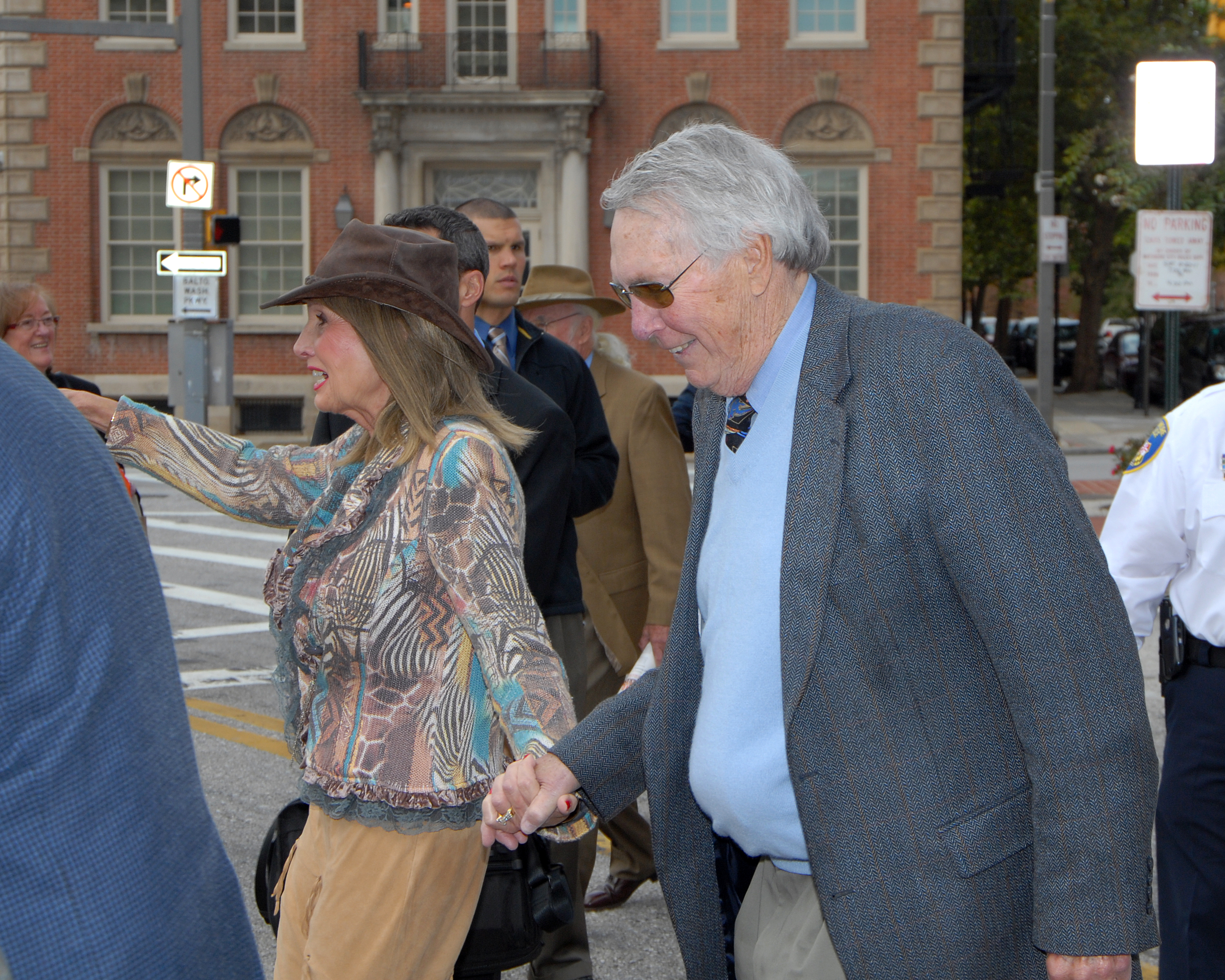
Robinson and his wife in 2011

Robinson met his future wife, Constance Louise "Connie" Butcher, on an Orioles team flight from Kansas City to Boston in July 1959, where she was working as a flight attendant for United Airlines. He was so smitten with her that he kept ordering iced teas from her. Some of his teammates encouraged him to go talk to her. After drinking his third glass, he returned it to her in the galley. There he told her: "I want to tell you something. If any of these guys, the Baltimore Orioles, ask you for a date, tell 'em you don't date married men. Understand? I'm the only single guy on the team." Actually, nearly half of the Orioles were single. Before the plane landed in Boston the two had made a date to go out. The two were married in her hometown of Windsor, Ontario, Canada on October 8, 1960. They resided in Owings Mills, Maryland, a suburb of Baltimore. They had four children: Brooks David (b. 1961), Chris (b. 1963), Michael (b. 1964), and Diana (b. 1968).

Raised a Methodist, in 1970 Robinson converted to Catholicism, his wife's faith. He was inspired to do so when his son, Brooks David, asked why he always went to a different church than the rest of the family on Sunday mornings. In deciding to convert, Robinson sought the advice of family friend Father Martin Schwalenberg, who taught Robinson about the Catholic faith. "For me, there is still one absolute–Jesus Christ," Robinson wrote in his 1974 autobiography. "The rest of us are still trying to reach his spiritual perfection, and that's the significant goal, no matter what form our worship takes." He was a member of the Fellowship of Christian Athletes since early in his baseball career.

One of Robinson's biggest hobbies was reading; while he was with the Orioles, he was a part of multiple book clubs. "Books about the Civil War and about World War II especially appeal to me," he wrote in his 1974 autobiography. He also enjoyed country western music.

=== Health issues and death ===
Robinson was diagnosed with prostate cancer in 2009, but it was discovered early, he underwent a successful emergency surgery, and his treatments were also successful. In 2010, doctors performed another emergency surgery for a large abdominal growth on Robinson. While recovering from it, he developed an infection on March 31, 2011, and spent nearly a month in the hospital. Even after he was released, further complications with the condition left him weakened the rest of the year.

In January 2012, Robinson attended a charity banquet at the Seminole Hard Rock Hotel and Casino in South Florida. While sitting on the third level of a raised platform on a stage, he leaned backwards, and his chair fell off the platform, resulting in another month-long hospital stay and more rehabilitation. In April 2014, Robinson and his attorneys sought a $9.9 million settlement with the Seminole Tribe of Florida as a result of the accident.

Robinson died from heart disease at home in Owings Mills on September 26, 2023, at age 86.

== See also ==
- List of Major League Baseball career at bat leaders
- List of Major League Baseball career hits leaders
- List of Major League Baseball career home run leaders
- List of Major League Baseball career doubles leaders
- List of Major League Baseball career games played leaders
- List of Major League Baseball career games played as a third baseman leaders
- List of Major League Baseball career intentional bases on balls leaders
- List of Major League Baseball career plate appearance leaders
- List of Major League Baseball career runs scored leaders
- List of Major League Baseball career runs batted in leaders
- List of Major League Baseball career singles leaders
- List of Major League Baseball career times on base leaders
- List of Major League Baseball career total bases leaders
- List of Major League Baseball players to hit for the cycle
- List of Major League Baseball annual runs batted in leaders
- List of Major League Baseball players who spent their entire career with one franchise

Awards and achievements
| Preceded by Frank Robinson | Hitting for the cycle July 15, 1960 | Succeeded by Bill White |
