= Opening Day Partners =

American baseball company

Opening Day Partners, LLC
- Type: Private
- Industry: baseball team operations
- Founded: 1982
- Headquarters: 921 Childs Point Road; Annapolis, MD 21401
- Key people: Peter Kirk, Jon Danos, Brad Sims, Brooks Robinson
- Website: Opening Day Partners

Opening Day Partners (ODP) is an American company that owns and operates independent baseball teams in the United States. Since 1982, Opening Day Partners has owned and operated its own Minor League Baseball teams, operated teams for other organizations, assisted in the sale and purchase of teams, and advised and consulted with international clients.

The company has sought to standardize comfortable ballpark features such as hotel lobby-style box offices, more legroom for fans, padded seats, individual cupholders, 360-degree walkways, picnic areas able to accommodate large groups, and spacious playgrounds. The company was the first in minor league baseball to implement 20-horse carousels and bumper boat attractions able to accommodate children and adults. Currently, the only minor league ballparks in the world that have the bumper boat attraction are Clipper Magazine Stadium and Regency Furniture Stadium.

ODP has placed an emphasis on philanthropy through various fundraisers, charity events, specialty jersey auctions, and children's reading programs. It also incorporates local fans, ranging from the occasional to the hardcore, with fan fests, name-the-team contests, the incorporation of local companies and their products, and homages to each team's baseball and socio-geographic history.

== History ==
Opening Day Partners, formerly known as Keystone Baseball, has owned and/or operated several Major League Baseball-affiliated, professional baseball teams in the Maryland cities of Aberdeen, Bowie, Frederick, Hagerstown, and Salisbury. The company developed Atlantic League of Professional Baseball clubs in Camden, New Jersey, Lancaster, Pennsylvania, York, Pennsylvania, Waldorf, Maryland and Sugar Land, Texas before transitioning them to local interests.

Baseball & Sports Associates, LLC is an Opening Day Partners-owned company that handles baseball operations, including player development for numerous Minor League Baseball teams.

=== Relationship with Major League Baseball ===
Opening Day Partners has a long-standing relationship with Major League Baseball, and many of its individual clubs. The assignments undertaken by Opening Day Partners and its affiliates include:

- Providing the grounds crew for the 2000 Summer Olympics in Sydney, Australia, under contract to the Commissioner's Office
- Providing stadium refurbishment and grounds crew for the Baltimore Orioles historic exhibition game in Havana, Cuba
- Providing field design and installation advisory services to the Houston Astros
- Advising several Major League Clubs on their Minor League operations
- Operating the Maryland Fall League for minor league players

=== Stadium design and construction projects ===
Through its facility management division, Opening Day Partners has provided stadium design, construction, and operation services to numerous communities, in addition to providing such services on its own ballparks. Clients have included:

Ballpark	Location
Leidos Field at Ripken Stadium	Aberdeen, Maryland
Surf Stadium	Atlantic City, New Jersey
Nymeo Field at Harry Grove Stadium	Frederick, Maryland
Hadlock Field	Portland, Maine
Arm & Hammer Park	Trenton, New Jersey
Prince George's Stadium	Bowie, Maryland
Arthur W. Perdue Stadium	Salisbury, Maryland
Daniel S. Frawley Stadium	Wilmington, Delaware

=== Food and beverage services ===
Through its food and beverage entities, Opening Day Partners has provided concession and catering services to minor league parks, arenas and universities nationwide including:

Venue	Location
Capital Centre	Landover, Maryland
TicketReturn.com Field	Myrtle Beach, South Carolina
EagleBank Arena	Fairfax, Virginia
Stanford University	Stanford, California
Towson State University	Towson, Maryland
