= List of Atlantic League records =

== Atlantic League records ==
Individual Batting
Category	Player	Stat	Team	Year
Batting average	Víctor Rodríguez	.371	Somerset Patriots	2004
Home runs	Ozzie Canseco	48	Newark Bears	2000
Home runs	Courtney Hawkins	48	Lexington Legends	2022
Runs batted in	Ozzie Canseco	129	Newark Bears	2000
Stolen bases	Billy Hall	104	Somerset Patriots	2000
Hits	Lew Ford	189	Long Island Ducks	2014
Doubles	Ray Navarrete	50	Long Island Ducks	2012
Triples	Eric Patterson	17	York Revolution	2014
Walks	Nellie Rodríguez	108	York Revolution	2022
Games	Lew Ford	140	Long Island Ducks	2014
Games	Fehlandt Lentini	140	Long Island Ducks	2016
Games	Jovan Rosa	140	New Britain Bees	2016
At bats	Fehlandt Lentini	593	Long Island Ducks	2014
On-base percentage	Doug Jennings	.505	Long Island Ducks	2004
Slugging percentage	Courtney Hawkins	.680	Lexington Legends	2021
Extra-base hits	Telvin Nash	77	York Revolution	2019
Runs	Scott Grimes	138	York Revolution	2010

Team Batting
Category	Stat	Team	Year
Wins	95	Sugar Land Skeeters	2013
Winning percentage	.679	Sugar Land Skeeters	2013
Batting average	.303	Newark Bears	2008
Home runs	220	Gastonia Honey Hunters	2023
Stolen bases	335	York Revolution	2024
Hits	1,504	Newark Bears	2008
Doubles	326	York Revolution	2010
Triples	48	Southern Maryland Blue Crabs	2015
Triples	48	York Revolution	2014
Runs batted in	823	Lexington Legends	2021
Runs	884	Lexington Legends	2021

Atlantic League Player of the Year
Year	Player	Team
1998	Felix Jose	Nashua Pride
1998	Kinnis Pledger	Bridgeport Bluefish
1999	Glenn Murray	Nashua Pride
2000	Ozzie Canseco	Newark Bears
2001	Michael Warner	Somerset Patriots
2002	Jimmy Hurst	Newark Bears
2003	Rolo Avila	Bridgeport Bluefish
2004	Victor Rodriguez	Somerset Patriots
2005	Brian Becker	Nashua Pride
2006	Lincoln Mikkelsen	Atlantic City Surf
2007	Jesse Hoorelbeke	Bridgeport Bluefish
2007	Victor Rodriguez	Newark Bears
2008	Josh Pressley	Somerset Patriots
2009	Ray Navarrete	Long Island Ducks
2010	Aaron Herr	Lancaster Barnstormers
2010	Scott Grimes	York Revolution
2011	Tommy Everidge	Lancaster Barnstormers
2012	Blake Gailen	Lancaster Barnstormers
2013	Jake Fox	Somerset Patriots
2014	Lew Ford	Long Island Ducks
2015	Welington Dotel	Bridgeport Bluefish
2016	Jeremy Barfield	Sugar Land Skeeters
2017	Alonzo Harris	York Revolution
2018	Jordany Valdespin	Long Island Ducks
2019	Telvin Nash	York Revolution
2021	Steve Lombardozzi Jr.	Long Island Ducks
2022	Courtney Hawkins	Lexington Legends
2023	Andretty Cordero	Lancaster Barnstormers
2024	Keon Barnum	Charleston Dirty Birds
2025	James Nelson	Charleston Dirty Birds
2026	Jacob Tester	York Revolution

Offensive Triple Crown Winners
Year	Player	Team	Batting avg.	Home runs	RBI
2002	Jimmy Hurst	Newark Bears	.341	35	100

Individual Pitching
Category	Player	Stat	Team	Year
Earned run average	Sean Bierman	1.79	Somerset Patriots	2015
Wins	Dan Reichert	18	Southern Maryland Blue Crabs	2010
Wins	Dwayne Pollok	18	Lancaster Barnstormers	2013
Strikeouts	Jonathan Albaladejo	164	Bridgeport Bluefish	2016
Saves	Jon Hunton	49	Somerset Patriots	2014
Games	Charlie Manning	74	Southern Maryland Blue Crabs	2013
Complete games	Andy Shibilo	11	Lehigh Valley Black Diamonds	2003
Shutouts	Daryl Thompson	3	Southern Maryland Blue Crabs	2022
Shutouts	Mitch Lambson	3	Southern Maryland Blue Crabs	2022
Shutouts	Ben Simon	3	Camden Riversharks	2003
Shutouts	Al Sontag	3	Bridgeport Bluefish	2000
Shutouts	Josh Stevens	3	Lancaster Barnstormers	2007
Shutouts	Dan Reichert	3	Bridgeport Bluefish	2009
Innings pitched	Al Sontag	207	Bridgeport Bluefish	2000
Losses	Félix Rodríguez	18	Pennsylvania Road Warriors	2004
Losses	Julián Heredia	18	Pennsylvania Road Warriors	2004
Losses	Julián Heredia	18	Long Island Ducks	2004
Walks allowed	Augie Sylk	108	Lancaster Barnstormers	2021
Home runs allowed	Julián Heredia	31	Pennsylvania Road Warriors	2004
Home runs allowed	Julián Heredia	31	Long Island Ducks	2004

Team Pitching
Category	Team	Stat	Year
Earned run average	Somerset Patriots	3.04	2015
Strikeouts	Long Island Ducks	1210	2019
Saves	Somerset Patriots	54	2014
Complete games	Lehigh Valley Black Diamonds	33	2000
Shutouts	Somerset Patriots	16	2015
Hits allowed	Bridgeport Bluefish	1,477	2008
Walks allowed	Lancaster Barnstormers	709	2021

Atlantic League Pitcher of the Year
Year	Player	Team
1998	Chris Eddy	Atlantic City Surf
1999	Justin Jensen	Somerset Patriots
2000	Al Sontag	Bridgeport Bluefish
2001	Len Picota	Nashua Pride
2002	Lincoln Mikkelsen	Camden Riversharks
2003	Ben Simon	Camden Riversharks
2004	Kevin Henthorne	Bridgeport Bluefish
2005	Brett Laxon	Camden Riversharks
2006	Lincoln Mikkelsen	Atlantic City Surf
2007	Brian Adams	Somerset Patriots
2008	Joe Gannon	Southern Maryland Blue Crabs
2009	Jim Magrane	Somerset Patriots
2010	Dan Reichert	Southern Maryland Blue Crabs
2011	Mike Loree	Long Island Ducks
2012	Dwayne Pollok	Lancaster Barnstormers
2013	Dwayne Pollok	Lancaster Barnstormers
2014	Chris Schwinden	Lancaster Barnstormers
2015	John Brownell	Long Island Ducks
2016	Jonathan Albaladejo	Bridgeport Bluefish
2017	Gaby Hernández	Southern Maryland Blue Crabs
2018	Nate Reed	Lancaster Barnstormers
2019	Daryl Thompson	Southern Maryland Blue Crabs
2021	Daryl Thompson	Southern Maryland Blue Crabs
2022	Daryl Thompson	Southern Maryland Blue Crabs
2023	Zach Mort	Gastonia Honey Hunters
2023	Nick Raquet	York Revolution
2024	Jon Olsen	York Revolution
2025	Noah Skirrow	Lancaster Stormers
2026	Kyle Virbitsky	Southern Maryland Blue Crabs

Pitching Triple Crown Winners
Year	Player	Team	Wins	ERA	SO's
2009	Joe Magrane	Somerset Patriots	15	2.70	134
2011	Mike Loree	Long Island Ducks	14	1.98	131

Defensive Player of the Year
Year	Player	Team	Position
2015	Dan Lyons	Long Island Ducks	Shortstop
2016	Eric Farris	Somerset Patriots	Second base
2017	Michael Crouse	New Britain Bees	Outfield
2018	Edwin Garcia	Southern Maryland Blue Crabs	Infield
2019	Edwin Garcia	Southern Maryland Blue Crabs	Infield
2021	Steve Lombardozzi Jr.	Long Island Ducks	Infield
2022	Melvin Mercedes	Lancaster Barnstormers	Infield
2023	Melvin Mercedes	Lancaster Barnstormers	Infield
2024	Jared Carr	Charleston Dirty Birds	Outfield
2025	Ben Aklinski	High Point Rockers	Outfield
2026	Jared Carr	Hagerstown Flying Boxcars	Outfield

Attendance
Category	Stat	Team	Year
Attendance total	456,511	Sugar Land Skeeters	2012
Attendance average	6,650	Sugar Land Skeeters	2012
Single-game attendance	8,606	Sugar Land Skeeters	July 4, 2016
Weekend attendance	22,907	Somerset Patriots	June 17–19, 2016

Team Totals
Category	Team	Stat	Year(s)
Season wins	Sugar Land Skeeters	95	2013
Season winning percentage	Sugar Land Skeeters	.679	2013
Overall wins	Long Island Ducks	1,687	
Season losses	Pennsylvania Road Warriors	103	2004
Overall losses	Long Island Ducks	1,496	
Championships	Somerset Patriots	6	2001, 2003, 2005, 2008, 2009, 2015
Championship series appearances	Somerset Patriots	10	1999, 2000, 2001, 2003, 2005, 2007, 2008, 2009, 2013, 2015

== Championship series ==
See: Atlantic League of Professional Baseball#Championship Series

== All-star game ==
See: Atlantic League of Professional Baseball#All-Star Games

== Longest game ==
On Tuesday, September 13, 2006, the Long Island Ducks and the Camden Riversharks played an 18-inning ballgame that set the league record for the longest game in Atlantic League history.

After the Ducks tied the score at five in the eighth inning, the game would progress another six frames before another run would cross the plate. Both clubs put up a two-spot in the 15th inning before Camden would score the game-winning run in the 18th, six hours and 20 minutes after the game began.

The 18-inning contest was the longest game played in the Atlantic League's history in both innings and time elapsed. During the contest, the teams combined for 34 hits, two doubles, a triple and three home runs, while the pitching staffs combined for 39 strikeouts (LGI 22, CA 17). During the game, fielders Jason Conti, Richie Barrett and Matt Demarco took the hill for the Riversharks. Conti picked up the win in his first career appearance on the hill after hurling three scoreless innings of relief.

== Atlantic League final standings ==
1998

Member teams

- Atlantic City Surf
- Bridgeport Bluefish
- Nashua Pride
- Newark Bears
- Newburgh Black Diamonds
- Somerset Patriots

First Half

Team	Wins	Losses	Games Back
Bridgeport	31	18	
Nashua	31	19	0.5
Atlantic City	30	20	1.5
Somerset	21	28	10
Newburgh	18	32	13.5
Newark	18	32	13.5

Second Half

Team	Wins	Losses	GB
Bridgeport	32	18	
Atlantic City	30	20	2
Nashua	28	22	4
Newburgh	24	26	8
Somerset	19	31	13
Newark	17	33	15

1999

Member teams

- Atlantic City Surf
- Bridgeport Bluefish
- Lehigh Valley Black Diamonds
- Nashua Pride
- Newark Bears
- Somerset Patriots

First Half

Team	Wins	Losses	Games Back
Bridgeport	43	17	
Atlantic City	36	24	7
Lehigh Valley	26	33	16.5
Nashua	26	34	17
Newark	24	35	18.5
Somerset	24	36	19

Second Half

Team	Wins	Losses	Games Back
Somerset	36	24	
Bridgeport	35	25	1
Newark	31	29	5
Nashua	26	33	9.5
Lehigh Valley	26	34	10
Atlantic City	25	34	10.5

2000

Member teams

- Atlantic City Surf
- Aberdeen Arsenal
- Bridgeport Bluefish
- Lehigh Valley Black Diamonds
- Long Island Ducks
- Nashua Pride
- Newark Bears
- Somerset Patriots

First Half

	Team	Wins	Losses	Games Back
North	Nashua	44	26	
North	Long Island	40	30	4
North	Newark	38	32	6
North	Bridgeport	35	35	9

	Team	Wins	Losses	Games Back
South	Somerset	38	32	
South	Aberdeen	30	40	8
South	Atlantic City	29	41	9
South	Lehigh Valley	26	44	12

Second Half

	Team	Wins	Losses	Games Back
North	Bridgeport	44	26	
North	Long Island	40	30	4
North	Nashua	38	32	6
North	Newark	35	35	9

	Team	Wins	Losses	Games Back
South	Somerset	31	18	
South	Atlantic City	31	19	0.5
South	Aberdeen	30	20	1.5
South	Lehigh Valley	21	28	10

2001

Member teams

- Atlantic City Surf
- Bridgeport Bluefish
- Camden Riversharks
- Lehigh Valley Black Diamonds
- Long Island Ducks
- Nashua Pride
- Newark Bears
- Somerset Patriots

First Half

	Team	Wins	Losses	Games Back
North	Newark	38	25	
North	Long Island	35	28	3
North	Nashua	30	33	8
North	Bridgeport	30	33	8

	Team	Wins	Losses	Games Back
South	Somerset	39	24	
South	Atlantic City	38	25	1
South	Camden	24	39	15
South	Lehigh Valley	18	45	21

Second Half

	Team	Wins	Losses	Games Back
North	Nashua	38	25	
North	Newark	37	26	1
North	Bridgeport	36	27	5.5
North	Long Island	27	36	11

	Team	Wins	Losses	Games Back
South	Somerset	44	19	
South	Atlantic City	26	37	18
South	Camden	25	38	19
South	Lehigh Valley	19	44	25

2002

Member teams

- Atlantic City Surf
- Bridgeport Bluefish
- Camden Riversharks
- Long Island Ducks
- Nashua Pride
- Newark Bears
- Pennsylvania Road Warriors
- Somerset Patriots

First Half

	Team	Wins	Losses	Games Back
North	Bridgeport	36	27	
North	Long Island	35	28	1
North	Nashua	29	34	7
North	Pennsylvania	17	45	18.5

	Team	Wins	Losses	Games Back
South	Newark	36	27	
South	Somerset	36	27	
South	Camden	34	29	2
South	Atlantic City	28	34	7.5

Second Half

	Team	Wins	Losses	Games Back
North	Bridgeport	35	28	
North	Long Island	30	33	5
North	Nashua	25	37	9.5
North	Pennsylvania	17	46	18

	Team	Wins	Losses	Games Back
South	Atlantic City	43	19	
South	Camden	37	25	6.0
South	Newark	33	28	9.5
South	Somerset	29	33	14

2003

Member teams

- Atlantic City Surf
- Bridgeport Bluefish
- Camden Riversharks
- Long Island Ducks
- Nashua Pride
- Newark Bears
- Pennsylvania Road Warriors
- Somerset Patriots

First Half

	Team	Wins	Losses	Games Back
North	Nashua	39	24	
North	Bridgeport	34	29	5
North	Long Island	32	31	7
North	Pennsylvania	14	49	25

	Team	Wins	Losses	Games Back
South	Camden	41	22	
South	Newark	32	31	9
South	Somerset	30	33	11
South	Atlantic City	30	33	11

Second Half

	Team	Wins	Losses	Games Back
North	Bridgeport	39	24	
North	Long Island	35	28	4
North	Nashua	32	31	7
North	Pennsylvania	16	46	22.5

	Team	Wins	Losses	Games Back
South	Somerset	37	26	
South	Camden	37	26	
South	Atlantic City	33	30	4
South	Newark	22	44	14.5

2004

Member teams

- Atlantic City Surf
- Bridgeport Bluefish
- Camden Riversharks
- Long Island Ducks
- Nashua Pride
- Newark Bears
- Pennsylvania Road Warriors
- Somerset Patriots

First Half

	Team	Wins	Losses	Games Back
North	Long Island	40	23	
North	Bridgeport	38	25	2
North	Nashua	29	34	11
North	Pennsylvania	10	53	30

	Team	Wins	Losses	Games Back
South	Atlantic City	38	25	
South	Camden	37	26	1
South	Somerset	33	30	5
South	Newark	27	36	11

Second Half

	Team	Wins	Losses	Games Back
North	Nashua	36	27	
North	Bridgeport	34	29	2
North	Long Island	25	38	11
North	Pennsylvania	13	50	23

	Team	Wins	Losses	Games Back
South	Camden	39	23	
South	Newark	36	27	3.5
South	Somerset	35	28	4.5
South	Atlantic City	33	29	6

2005

Member teams

- Atlantic City Surf
- Bridgeport Bluefish
- Camden Riversharks
- Lancaster Barnstormers
- Long Island Ducks
- Nashua Pride
- Newark Bears
- Somerset Patriots

First Half

	Team	Wins	Losses	Games Back
North	Nashua	43	27	
North	Bridgeport	33	37	10.0
North	Newark	33	37	10.0
North	Long Island	30	40	13.0

	Team	Wins	Losses	Games Back
South	Somerset	42	28	
South	Camden	39	31	3.0
South	Atlantic City	31	39	11.0
South	Lancaster	29	41	13.0

Second Half

	Team	Wins	Losses	Games Back
North	Long Island	36	34	
North	Nashua	35	35	1.0
North	Newark	25	45	11.0
North	Bridgeport	22	48	14.0

	Team	Wins	Losses	Games Back
South	Atlantic City	48	22	
South	Camden	41	29	7.0
South	Lancaster	37	33	11.0
South	Somerset	36	34	12.0

2006

Member teams

- Atlantic City Surf
- Bridgeport Bluefish
- Camden Riversharks
- Lancaster Barnstormers
- Long Island Ducks
- Newark Bears
- Road Warriors
- Somerset Patriots

First Half

	Team	Wins	Losses	Games Back
North	Long Island	39	24	
North	Bridgeport	38	25	1.0
North	Road Warriors	22	41	17.0
North	Newark	21	42	18.0

	Team	Wins	Losses	Games Back
South	Lancaster	38	25	
South	Somerset	33	30	5.0
South	Atlantic City	33	30	5.0
South	Camden	28	35	10.0

Second Half

	Team	Wins	Losses	Games Back
North	Bridgeport	36	23	
North	Long Island	33	29	4.5
North	Newark	21	40	16.0
North	Road Warriors	20	41	17.0

	Team	Wins	Losses	Games Back
South	Lancaster	36	26	
South	Atlantic City	35	27	1.0
South	Camden	33	29	3.0
South	Somerset	31	30	4.5

2007

Member teams

- Bridgeport Bluefish
- Camden Riversharks
- Lancaster Barnstormers
- Long Island Ducks
- Newark Bears
- Road Warriors
- Somerset Patriots
- York Revolution

First Half

	Team	Wins	Losses	Games Back
North	Newark	36	27	
North	Long Island	35	28	1.0
North	Bridgeport	35	28	1.0
North	Road Warriors	17	46	19.0

	Team	Wins	Losses	Games Back
South	Camden	39	24	
South	Somerset	35	28	4.0
South	Lancaster	29	34	10.0
South	York	26	37	13.0

Second Half

	Team	Wins	Losses	Games Back
North	Long Island	37	26	
North	Newark	36	27	1.0
North	Road Warriors	26	37	11.0
North	Bridgeport	20	41	12.0

	Team	Wins	Losses	Games Back
South	Somerset	40	23	
South	York	32	31	8.0
South	Lancaster	28	35	12.0
South	Camden	28	35	12.0

2008

Member teams

- Bridgeport Bluefish
- Camden Riversharks
- Lancaster Barnstormers
- Long Island Ducks
- Newark Bears
- Somerset Patriots
- Southern Maryland Blue Crabs
- York Revolution

First Half

	Team	Wins	Losses	Games Back
Freedom	Somerset	40	30	
Freedom	Newark	39	31	1.0
Freedom	Lancaster	30	40	10.0
Freedom	York	30	40	10.0

	Team	Wins	Losses	Games Back
Liberty	Camden	40	30	
Liberty	Southern Maryland	36	34	4.0
Liberty	Bridgeport	33	37	7.0
Liberty	Long Island	32	38	8.0

Second Half

	Team	Wins	Losses	Games Back
Freedom	York	41	39	
Freedom	Somerset	34	36	7.0
Freedom	Lancaster	34	36	7.0
Freedom	Newark	33	37	8.0

	Team	Wins	Losses	Games Back
Liberty	Long Island	39	31	
Liberty	Southern Maryland	38	32	1.0
Liberty	Bridgeport	34	36	5.0
Liberty	Camden	27	42	12.0

2009

Member teams

- Bridgeport Bluefish
- Camden Riversharks
- Lancaster Barnstormers
- Long Island Ducks
- Newark Bears
- Somerset Patriots
- Southern Maryland Blue Crabs
- York Revolution

First Half

	Team	Wins	Losses	Games Back
Freedom	Somerset	43	27	
Freedom	Newark	35	35	8.0
Freedom	Lancaster	33	37	10.0
Freedom	York	24	46	19.0

	Team	Wins	Losses	Games Back
Liberty	Southern Maryland	42	28	
Liberty	Long Island	37	33	5.0
Liberty	Bridgeport	33	37	9.0
Liberty	Camden	33	37	9.0

Second Half

	Team	Wins	Losses	Games Back
Freedom	Somerset	43	27	
Freedom	Newark	39	31	4.0
Freedom	Lancaster	34	36	9.0
Freedom	York	29	41	14.0

	Team	Wins	Losses	Games Back
Liberty	Southern Maryland	37	33	
Liberty	Long Island	37	33	
Liberty	Bridgeport	32	38	5.0
Liberty	Camden	29	41	8.0

2010

Member teams

- Bridgeport Bluefish
- Camden Riversharks
- Lancaster Barnstormers
- Long Island Ducks
- Newark Bears
- Somerset Patriots
- Southern Maryland Blue Crabs
- York Revolution

First Half

	Team	Wins	Losses	Games Back
Freedom	York	40	30	
Freedom	Somerset	36	34	4.0
Freedom	Lancaster	31	39	9.0
Freedom	Newark	21	49	19.0

	Team	Wins	Losses	Games Back
Liberty	Southern Maryland	41	29	
Liberty	Camden	39	31	2.0
Liberty	Bridgeport	36	34	5.0
Liberty	Long Island	36	34	5.0

Second Half

	Team	Wins	Losses	Games Back
Freedom	Somerset	39	31	
Freedom	Lancaster	32	37	6.5
Freedom	Newark	32	37	6.5
Freedom	York	29	41	10.0

	Team	Wins	Losses	Games Back
Liberty	Bridgeport	47	23	
Liberty	Southern Maryland	41	28	5.5
Liberty	Long Island	34	34	12.0
Liberty	Camden	23	46	23.5

2011

Member teams

- Bridgeport Bluefish
- Camden Riversharks
- Lancaster Barnstormers
- Long Island Ducks
- Road Warriors
- Somerset Patriots
- Southern Maryland Blue Crabs
- York Revolution

First Half

	Team	Wins	Losses	Games Back
Freedom	Lancaster	37	26	
Freedom	York	36	27	1.0
Freedom	Somerset	26	37	11.0
Freedom	Road Warriors	22	41	15.0

	Team	Wins	Losses	Games Back
Liberty	Long Island	41	29	
Liberty	Southern Maryland	39	31	4.0
Liberty	Bridgeport	36	34	8.0
Liberty	Camden	36	34	17.0

Second Half

	Team	Wins	Losses	Games Back
Freedom	York	37	24	
Freedom	Lancaster	32	30	5.5
Freedom	Somerset	23	37	13.5
Freedom	Road Warriors	16	45	21

	Team	Wins	Losses	Games Back
Liberty	Long Island	38	24	
Liberty	Bridgeport	36	28	3
Liberty	Camden	34	27	3.5
Liberty	Southern Maryland	29	30	7.5

2012

Member teams

- Bridgeport Bluefish
- Camden Riversharks
- Lancaster Barnstormers
- Long Island Ducks
- Somerset Patriots
- Southern Maryland Blue Crabs
- Sugar Land Skeeters
- York Revolution

First Half

	Team	Wins	Losses	Games Back
Freedom	Lancaster	45	25	
Freedom	York	36	34	9.0
Freedom	Somerset	35	35	10.0
Freedom	Sugar Land	29	41	16.0

	Team	Wins	Losses	Games Back
Liberty	Long Island	39	30	
Liberty	Camden	34	35	5.0
Liberty	Bridgeport	31	39	8.5
Liberty	Southern Maryland	30	40	9.5

Second Half

	Team	Wins	Losses	Games Back
Freedom	Lancaster	43	27	
Freedom	York	43	27	
Freedom	Sugar Land	35	35	8.0
Freedom	Somerset	30	39	12.5

	Team	Wins	Losses	Games Back
Liberty	Southern Maryland	39	31	
Liberty	Bridgeport	36	33	2.5
Liberty	Camden	28	42	11.0
Liberty	Long Island	24	44	14.0

2013

Member teams

- Bridgeport Bluefish
- Camden Riversharks
- Lancaster Barnstormers
- Long Island Ducks
- Somerset Patriots
- Southern Maryland Blue Crabs
- Sugar Land Skeeters
- York Revolution

First Half

	Team	Wins	Losses	Games Back
Freedom	Sugar Land	47	23	
Freedom	Somerset	46	24	1.0
Freedom	Lancaster	36	33	10.5
Freedom	York	36	34	11.0

	Team	Wins	Losses	Games Back
Liberty	Southern Maryland	37	32	
Liberty	Long Island	30	40	7.5
Liberty	Camden	24	46	13.5
Liberty	Bridgeport	23	47	14.5

Second Half

	Team	Wins	Losses	Games Back
Freedom	Sugar Land	48	22	
Freedom	Somerset	44	25	3.5
Freedom	Lancaster	36	34	12.0
Freedom	York	29	41	19.0

	Team	Wins	Losses	Games Back
Liberty	Long Island	33	37	
Liberty	Bridgeport	31	38	1.5
Liberty	Camden	30	40	3.0
Liberty	Southern Maryland	28	42	5.0

2014

Member teams

- Bridgeport Bluefish
- Camden Riversharks
- Lancaster Barnstormers
- Long Island Ducks
- Somerset Patriots
- Southern Maryland Blue Crabs
- Sugar Land Skeeters
- York Revolution

2015

Member teams

- Bridgeport Bluefish
- Camden Riversharks
- Lancaster Barnstormers
- Long Island Ducks
- Somerset Patriots
- Southern Maryland Blue Crabs
- Sugar Land Skeeters
- York Revolution

2016

Member teams

- Bridgeport Bluefish
- Lancaster Barnstormers
- Long Island Ducks
- New Britain Bees
- Somerset Patriots
- Southern Maryland Blue Crabs
- Sugar Land Skeeters
- York Revolution

2017

Member teams

- Bridgeport Bluefish
- Lancaster Barnstormers
- Long Island Ducks
- New Britain Bees
- Somerset Patriots
- Southern Maryland Blue Crabs
- Sugar Land Skeeters
- York Revolution

2018

Member teams

- Lancaster Barnstormers
- Long Island Ducks
- New Britain Bees
- Road Warriors
- Somerset Patriots
- Southern Maryland Blue Crabs
- Sugar Land Skeeters
- York Revolution

2019

Member teams

- High Point Rockers
- Lancaster Barnstormers
- Long Island Ducks
- New Britain Bees
- Somerset Patriots
- Southern Maryland Blue Crabs
- Sugar Land Skeeters
- York Revolution

First Half

	Team	Wins	Losses	Games Back
Freedom	Sugar Land	35	35	
Freedom	York	34	36	1.0
Freedom	Southern Maryland	26	44	9.0
Freedom	Lancaster	24	46	11.0

	Team	Wins	Losses	Games Back
Liberty	Long Island	43	27	
Liberty	Somerset	42	28	1.0
Liberty	High Point	41	30	2.5
Liberty	New Britain	35	34	7.5

Second Half

	Team	Wins	Losses	Games Back
Freedom	York	41	29	
Freedom	Sugar Land	37	31	3.0
Freedom	Southern Maryland	33	37	8.0
Freedom	Lancaster	27	43	14.0

	Team	Wins	Losses	Games Back
Liberty	Long Island	43	27	
Liberty	New Britain	37	34	6.5
Liberty	High Point	33	36	9.5
Liberty	Somerset	27	41	15.0

2020 (Did not play due to COVID-19 pandemic)

Member teams

- High Point Rockers
- Lancaster Barnstormers
- Long Island Ducks
- Road Warriors
- Somerset Patriots
- Southern Maryland Blue Crabs
- Sugar Land Skeeters
- York Revolution

2021

Member teams

- Gastonia Honey Hunters
- High Point Rockers
- Lancaster Barnstormers
- Lexington Legends
- Long Island Ducks
- Southern Maryland Blue Crabs
- West Virginia Power
- York Revolution

2022

Member teams

- Charleston Dirty Birds
- Gastonia Honey Hunters
- High Point Rockers
- Lancaster Barnstormers
- Lexington Legends
- Long Island Ducks
- Southern Maryland Blue Crabs
- Staten Island FerryHawks
- York Revolution

2023

Member teams

- Charleston Dirty Birds
- Gastonia Honey Hunters
- High Point Rockers
- Lancaster Barnstormers
- Lexington Counter Clocks
- Long Island Ducks
- Southern Maryland Blue Crabs
- Spire City Ghost Hounds
- Staten Island FerryHawks
- York Revolution

2024

Member teams

- Charleston Dirty Birds
- Gastonia
- Hagerstown Flying Boxcars
- High Point Rockers
- Lancaster Stormers
- Lexington Legends
- Long Island Ducks
- Southern Maryland Blue Crabs
- Staten Island FerryHawks
- York Revolution

2025

Member teams

- Charleston Dirty Birds
- Gastonia
- Hagerstown Flying Boxcars
- High Point Rockers
- Lancaster Stormers
- Lexington Legends
- Long Island Ducks
- Southern Maryland Blue Crabs
- Spire City Ghost Hounds
- Staten Island FerryHawks
- York Revolution

== Former teams ==
See: Atlantic League of Professional Baseball#Former teams

== Sources ==
- Atlantic League of Professional Baseball
- Atlantic League Baseball
- Atlantic League information
- Record Book, 1998-2023 (Archived version)
