= Arthur Rhodes =

American baseball player (born 1969)

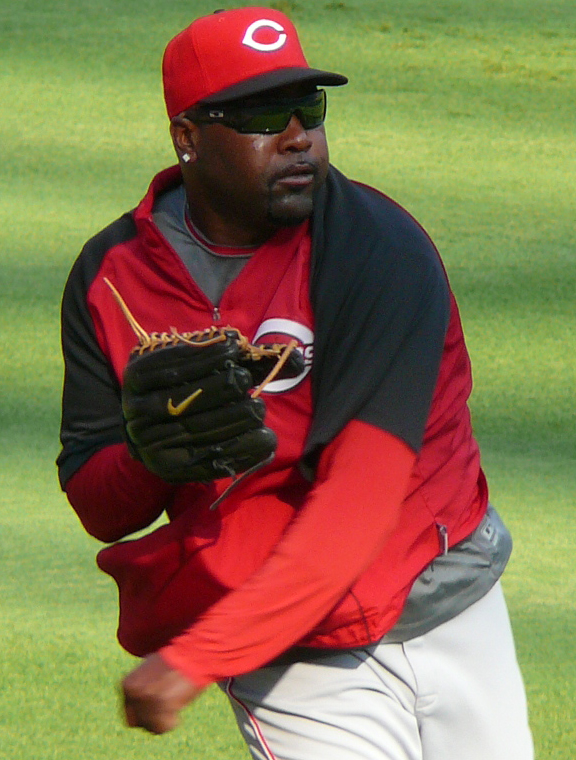
- Rhodes with the Cincinnati Reds in 2009

Hagerstown Flying Boxcars
- Pitcher / Coach
- Born: October 24, 1969 (age 57); Waco, Texas, U.S.
- Batted: Left Threw: Left

MLB debut
- August 21, 1991, for the Baltimore Orioles

Last MLB appearance
- September 27, 2011, for the St. Louis Cardinals

MLB statistics
- Win–loss record: 87–70
- Earned run average: 4.08
- Strikeouts: 1,152
- Stats at Baseball Reference

Teams
- Baltimore Orioles (1991–1999); Seattle Mariners (2000–2003); Oakland Athletics (2004); Cleveland Indians (2005); Philadelphia Phillies (2006); Seattle Mariners (2008); Florida Marlins (2008); Cincinnati Reds (2009–2010); Texas Rangers (2011); St. Louis Cardinals (2011)

Career highlights and awards
- All-Star (2010); World Series champion (2011)

Arthur Lee Rhodes Jr. (born October 24, 1969) is an American former professional baseball left-handed relief pitcher and current pitching coach for the Hagerstown Flying Boxcars of the Atlantic League of Professional Baseball. He played 20 seasons in Major League Baseball (MLB) for the Baltimore Orioles, Seattle Mariners, Oakland Athletics, Cleveland Indians, Philadelphia Phillies, Florida Marlins, Cincinnati Reds, Texas Rangers, and St. Louis Cardinals.

== Playing career ==
Rhodes played high school baseball at La Vega High School in Waco, Texas. As a senior in 1988, he finished the season with a 17–0 record.

=== Baltimore Orioles ===
The Baltimore Orioles drafted Rhodes in the second round of the 1988 Major League Baseball draft. During his 1991 season with the class AA Hagerstown Suns, Rhodes was selected as Eastern League Pitcher of the Year. Rhodes made his MLB debut with the Orioles in 1991, spending the next four years compiling a 20–24 record as a starter. After moving to the Baltimore bullpen in 1996, he compiled an 8–1 record and posted an ERA of 3.50 in 26 games. In 1997, he earned 10 wins despite not starting any games. He entered free agency after the 1999 season.

=== Seattle Mariners ===
Rhodes became a top setup man for the Seattle Mariners, becoming a key part of their bullpen for the wild-card team in 2000 and the 116-win team in 2001. Rhodes finished the season with an 8–0 record while posting an ERA of 1.72. He was involved in a notable incident in 2001 when he was ejected from a game against the Cleveland Indians. Former Mariner Omar Vizquel complained that sunlight was reflecting off Rhodes' earrings. Rhodes refused to remove his earrings, leading to a bench-clearing brawl.

=== Oakland Athletics ===
Rhodes signed with the Oakland Athletics after the 2003 season. A's manager Ken Macha first used him as a closer after years as a successful setup man in Seattle, but he failed in this capacity with a number of blown saves and was traded to the Pittsburgh Pirates, along with Mark Redman and cash for catcher Jason Kendall and cash after the one season with the Athletics.

=== Cleveland Indians ===
In the same offseason, the Pirates traded Rhodes to the Cleveland Indians for Matt Lawton, and, as he did in Seattle, Rhodes became the top setup man for the Tribe.

=== Philadelphia Phillies ===
On January 27, 2006, after one year in Cleveland, the Indians traded him to the Philadelphia Phillies for outfielder Jason Michaels.

=== Second stint with Mariners ===
On January 24, 2007, Rhodes was re-signed by the Mariners to a minor league contract with an invitation to spring training by the Mariners. He injured his pitching arm, underwent Tommy John surgery in May, and missed the entire 2007 season, becoming a free agent after the season. On January 15, 2008, the Mariners once again signed him to a minor league deal and invited him to spring training. He didn't make the team to start the season, but on April 14 was added to the active roster.

=== Florida Marlins ===
On July 31, 2008, the Mariners traded him to the Florida Marlins for pitching prospect Gaby Hernandez.

=== Cincinnati Reds ===
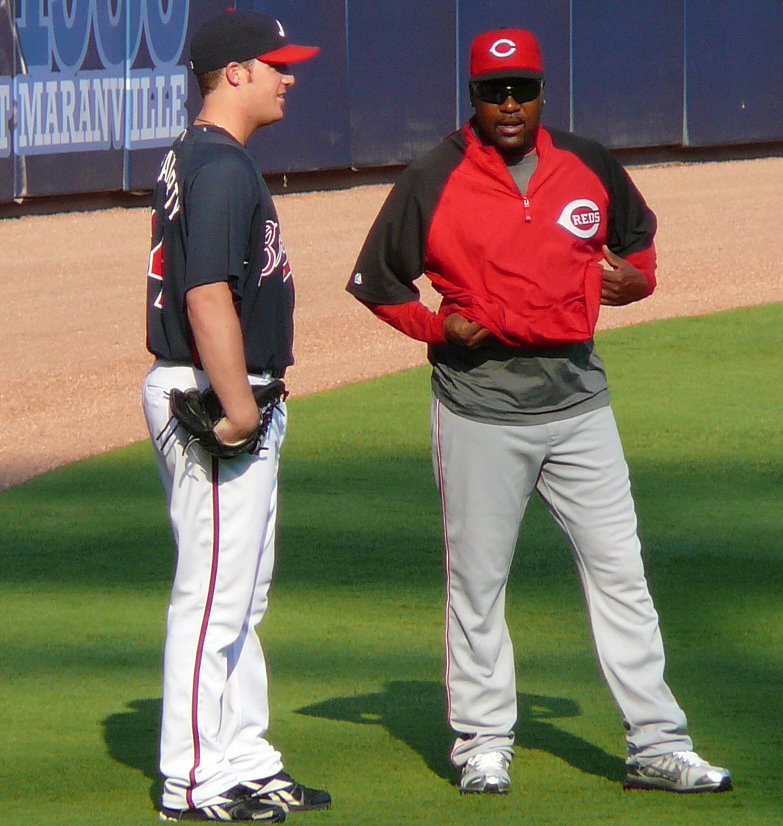
Rhodes (right) with former Mariners teammate Eric O'Flaherty in 2009.

On December 12, 2008, Rhodes signed a two-year contract with the Cincinnati Reds. On June 29, 2010, his major league record-tying streak of 33 scoreless appearances was broken by Phillies slugger Raúl Ibañez.

In 2010, Rhodes was selected to his first and only All-Star Game in his 20th major league season. He was the fifth player to go to his first All-Star Game after age 40, joining Satchel Paige, Connie Marrero, Jamie Moyer and Tim Wakefield.

=== Texas Rangers ===
On December 23, 2010, Rhodes signed a one-year deal with the Texas Rangers with a vesting option for 2012. He appeared in 32 games for the Rangers before being designated for assignment on August 2, 2011 and released on August 8.

=== St. Louis Cardinals ===
On August 11, Rhodes signed with the St. Louis Cardinals. Given the late signing, the Rangers had to pay most of his salary, with the Cardinals responsible for only a pro-rated league minimum for the remainder of the year. Because the Cardinals and Rangers faced each other in the 2011 World Series this created an unusual situation, with the Rangers paying most of the salary of a player trying to deny them a world championship. This also resulted in Rhodes being eligible to receive a World Series ring no matter who won. The Cardinals won the World Series against the Texas Rangers in 7 games. Rhodes, who pitched in three games in this Series, joined Lonnie Smith as the only players to play in a World Series for the winning team against the team he had played for earlier in the season (Smith played on the 1985 World Series-winning Kansas City Royals after having been traded from the Cardinals, whom the Royals defeated in the Series, earlier in the season).

Through 2011, Rhodes was second among active pitchers in games played (900), and seventh in hits per 9 innings pitched (7.828) and strikeouts per 9 IP (8.730). While he had been the tenth-youngest player in the AL as a rookie in 1991, he was the second-oldest player in the NL in 2011.

=== Retirement ===
Rhodes officially announced his retirement from baseball on January 16, 2015. He held the MLB record for holds with 231, surpassed by Tony Watson in 2021.

== Coaching career ==
=== Cleburne Railroaders ===
On July 6, 2021, Rhodes was hired as the pitching coach for the Cleburne Railroaders of the American Association of Independent Professional Baseball.

=== Lexington Legends ===
On February 21, 2024, Rhodes became the pitching coach for the Lexington Legends of the Atlantic League of Professional Baseball.

=== Hagerstown Flying Boxcars ===
On October 30, 2024, Rhodes became the pitching coach for the Hagerstown Flying Boxcars of the Atlantic League.

== Personal ==
Rhodes' son, Jordan, died at five years old in December 2008 of an undisclosed illness. Rhodes wrote his son's initials in the dirt on the mound before every appearance for the remainder of his career.

Rhodes' older brother, Ricky, pitched in the minor leagues for the New York Yankees. He later served as the women's basketball coach at McLennan Community College.

Rhodes' daughter, Jade, played college softball at Auburn and advanced to the Women's College World Series championship series in 2016. Jade Rhodes also played professional softball for the Pennsylvania Rebellion, Scrap Yard Dawgs, and Cleveland Comets from 2016 to 2018. She then became a college softball coach at Eastern New Mexico University and Oklahoma Baptist University.
