= Courtney Hawkins =

Courtney Hawkins is the name of:

- Courtney Hawkins (hurdler) (born 1967), American hurdler
- Courtney Hawkins (American football) (born 1969), American football player (wide receiver)
- Courtney Hawkins (baseball) (born 1993), baseball player
