= Jesse Hoorelbeke =

American former professional baseball (born 1977)

Personal information
- Born: Torrance, CA
- Occupation: Photographer

Sport
- Country: US
- Sport: Baseball
- Position: First Baseman, Leftfielder, Rightfielder
- University team: University of Louisiana-Monroe
- Turned pro: 2002
- Retired: 2012
- Awards: 2007 ALPB Player of the Year; 2012 ALPB Mid-Season All-Star

Jesse Hoorelbeke (born October 13, 1977) is an American former professional baseball player who played in the minor leagues, for several teams on multiple levels.

== Early life ==
Hoorelbeke was born in Torrance, California and attended Coeur D'alene High School in Coeur D'Alene, Idaho. He initially attended Washington State University, but transferred to University of Louisiana-Monroe. In 2001, his final year at the University of Louisiana, he slashed .366/.428/.569 with 10 home runs and 46 RBI. He went undrafted, but was signed to play in the Los Angeles Dodgers organization by scout George Genovese. His father is Peter Rivera, lead singer and drummer for the rock band Rare Earth.

== Professional career ==
He played professionally from 2002 to 2012. His first season, he hit .309/.383/.520 with eight home runs and 34 RBI for the Great Falls Dodgers. At 24 years old, he was the oldest regular player in the Pioneer League. He tied Hector Perozo for the team lead in sacrifice flies with three. He played 109 games between the South Georgia Waves and Vero Beach Dodgers in 2003, hitting .303/.365/.515 with 22 home runs and 68 RBI. On both teams, he was the oldest player who had a minimum of 100 at-bats. He led the Waves in batting average (.326), on-base percentage (.403), slugging percentage (.574) and OPS (.976). Had he qualified, he would have led the South Atlantic League in slugging and OPS.

Between Vero Beach and the Jacksonville Suns in 2004, Hoorelbeke hit .210/.310/.431 with 17 home runs and 54 RBI. He was let go by the Dodgers following the 2004 campaign and signed with the Seattle Mariners. He played for the San Antonio Missions in 2005, hitting .249/.326/.451 with 22 home runs and 81 RBI. He led the Texas League in strikeouts (156) and the team in home runs and RBI.

He joined the independent ranks in 2006 and hit .332/.410/.647 with 21 home runs and 65 RBI in 74 games for the Fargo-Moorhead RedHawks. He led the Northern League in home runs, slugging and OPS (1.057). On June 18, he became one of the few players to hit four home runs in a single game, the first independent ballplayer to do so since Ryan Jones in 2000. He also hit five home runs with nine RBI for the Triple-A Iowa Cubs in the Chicago Cubs system to bring his season totals to 26 home runs and 74 RBI. With the 2007 Bridgeport Bluefish, Hoorelbeke hit .313/.396/.586 with 33 home runs and 94 RBI. He paced the Atlantic League in home runs for his second-straight homer title. He also played for the Caneros de los Mochis of the Mexican Pacific Winter League that year. In 2008, Hoorelbeke hit .276/.362/.505 with 28 home runs and 106 RBI for Bridgeport. He also played briefly for the Arkansas Travelers of the Los Angeles Angels system. He tied Pat Osborn for the league lead in RBI. In 2009, Hoorelbeke hit .293/.391/.517 with 23 home runs and 88 RBI in 120 games for Bridgeport. He played for the Fargo-Moorhead again in 2010 and hit 29 home runs and 75 RBI. Back with Fargo-Moorhead in 2011, he hit 15 home runs and had 75 RBI. That year, he set the career record for independent league home runs, breaking Jorge Alvarez's mark. With the Somerset Patriots in 2012, he had 20 home runs and 53 RBI.

Overall, Hoorelbeke hit 74 home runs with 247 RBI in affiliated baseball and had 165 home runs and 541 RBI in independent baseball.

He now works as a professional photographer.
