= Wheeler Field (Virginia Beach) =

Coordinates: 36°45′58.75″N 76°05′32.19″W

- Interactive map of Wheeler Field
- Location: Landstown Road; Virginia Beach, Virginia, US
- Operator: Virginia Beach Neptunes
- Capacity: 5,000
- Surface: grass

Construction
- Cost: Around $40 million

Tenants
- Virginia Beach Neptunes (TBD); Tidewater Community College (TBD)

Wheeler Field was a proposed 5,000-seat ballpark in Virginia Beach, Virginia. It was supposed to host the Virginia Beach Neptunes of the Atlantic League of Professional Baseball, an unspecified team in a summer wooden-bat league, and a junior college team from Tidewater Community College's Virginia Beach campus. Wheeler Capital, a limited liability company that specializes in venture capital financing and small business loans throughout the Mid-Atlantic states, purchased the naming rights for the stadium for an undisclosed amount through 2025.

== History ==
In February 2014, Virginia Beach Professional Baseball received city council approval for a ballpark near the Virginia Beach Sportsplex with completion expected by April 2015. The proposal included a 60,000 square feet (5,600 m^{2}) building designed for Sentara sports medicine, team offices, and 13 recreational athletic fields surrounding Wheeler Field. Subsequent changes deferred three of the fields to a later second phase of the project with the ballpark opening in 2017 and the entire project estimated to cost $37 million.
