= Blue Crabs Stadium =

Baseball stadium in Waldorf, Maryland

Coordinates: 38°33′45″N 76°54′13″W

- Home of Crustacean Nation
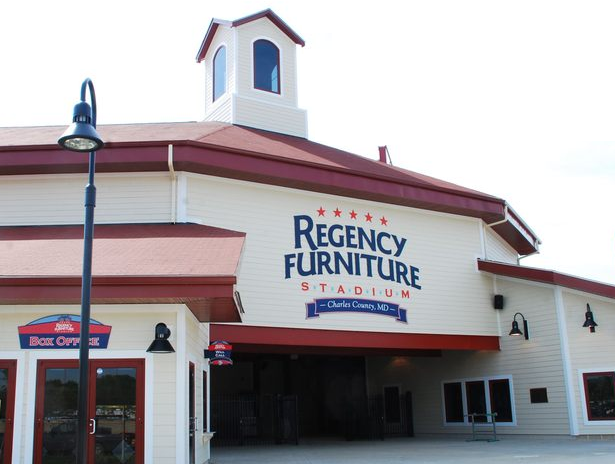
- Former names: Regency Furniture Stadium (2008–2025)
- Address: 11765 Saint Linus Drive; Waldorf, Maryland 20602
- Owner: Charles County, Maryland
- Operator: Opening Day Partners; Southern Maryland Blue Crabs
- Capacity: 6,200
- Surface: grass
- Field size: Left Field: 310 feet (94 m); Center Field: 400 feet (120 m); Right Field: 325 feet (99 m)

Construction
- Groundbreaking: July 27, 2007
- Opened: May 2, 2008
- Cost: $25.6 million
- Architects: Tetra Tech, Inc.

Tenants
- Southern Maryland Blue Crabs (ALPB) (2008–present); Southern Maryland Nationals (CRCBL) (2010–2013)

Blue Crabs Stadium is a 6,200-seat baseball park in Waldorf, Maryland that hosted its first regular-season baseball game on May 2, 2008, as the tenants of the facility, the Southern Maryland Blue Crabs defeated the Lancaster Barnstormers, 3–2. For the 2010 baseball season, the collegiate summer Southern Maryland Nationals of the Cal Ripken, Sr. Collegiate Baseball League will play select games at the venue. The CRSCBL previously used Blue Crabs Stadium for the Mid-Atlantic Classic (see below). With the groundbreaking for Southern Maryland's new stadium, local company Regency Furniture purchased the naming rights for $2.88 million over 10 years.

Blue Crabs Stadium is capped by sloping red roofs, similar to the architecture of Churchill Downs, designed to pay homage to the Southern Maryland region's tobacco barns. The left field wall of the ballpark bears a door that allows players to enter the field from the locker room, modeled after the Green Monster at Fenway Park.

== History ==
In 1985, Charles County began planning a ballpark for the relocated Kinston Indians of the Carolina League. Construction workers even cleared trees to prepare the site; however, the ballpark planning eventually fell through. After county commissioners balked at the construction, $500,000 in public funds were paid to cancel signed contracts and undo the progress made during site preparation. The A affiliate of the Cleveland Indians remained in Kinston, and the Southern Maryland region was without a professional baseball team for another 23 years.

In 2004, a company called Opening Day Partners renewed interest in a Charles County ballpark. The stadium was originally slated for Hughesville, but residents voted against it to maintain the area's "rural charm." After Hughesville residents denied the ballpark, all interest shifted to Waldorf, a bedroom community of Washington, D.C. The Atlantic League of Professional Baseball formally announced an expansion team for Waldorf on February 15, 2006, to begin play in the 2008 season. The Blue Crabs were originally supposed to be an expansion team for the 2007 season. Still, the construction bids for Blue Crabs Stadium came in over budget. The ballpark instead opened in 2008.

In May 2007, commissioners from Charles County approved a $19 million bid for the construction of Blue Crabs Stadium. The groundbreaking ceremony was held on July 27, 2007, with Maryland Governor Martin O'Malley in attendance and CEO of Regency Furniture.

=== 2024 bouncy house incident ===
On August 3, 2024, an incident occurred at the stadium when a strong gust of wind unexpectedly lifted a bouncy house, sending it airborne and flipping it over. At the time, two children were inside the bouncy house, and both fell about fifteen feet (from where the bouncy house was airborne) onto the baseball field. One child, a 5-year-old from nearby La Plata, was killed, and the other child was seriously injured.

Several attendees alleged that, before the incident, the bouncy house had not been properly tied down and employees were on their phones, not supervising the children. After the incident, several claims of similar bouncy house incidents (specifically in 2010 and 2012) were made, which led to the bouncy house being permanently removed; however, these claims were never officially confirmed. The 2024 incident was the only one that proved to be fatal.

=== Proposed renovations and additions ===
On January 9, 2026, it was announced that the stadium was expected to undergo a $38 million renovation, which would include upgrades to the stadium as well as construction of a new clubhouse and training center. The project would be funded by the Maryland Stadium Authority and would not use county tax dollars. State officials have said that the stadium is in need of capital improvements in order to meet Atlantic League and professional development league facility standards for continued safe operation. If the plans go through, it is unknown when renovations for the stadium would begin.

== Ballpark attractions ==
Blue Crabs Stadium's concession stands were previously all named after Hall of Famer and former team co-owner Brooks Robinson, featuring the MVP Grill, the Gold Glove Grill, Hall of Fame Seafood, the Hot Corner Carvery, the All-Star Pizzeria, and Five's Fare. Among the more common ballpark fare, the menu featured several seafood-themed concessions such as the sea dog (fish on a hot dog bun), fried rockfish, crab cakes, crab balls, and the crab-filled soft pretzel. A tent-covered picnic area, formerly known as the Texas Roadhouse Corral, overlooks left field. Beer was available at the Backfin Pale Ale brewery. Starting with the 2017 season, the stadium features a dedicated concession stand offering food from Chickie's & Pete's, a Philadelphia-area sports bar, as well as hot dogs from Nick's of Clinton (a local provider), Domino's Pizza, Rita's Italian Ice custard cookie sandwiches, Dippin' Dots, and Pepsi products.

Children at the ballpark can enjoy Pinch's Playground, which includes a rock climbing wall and various recreational amenities. Additional attractions include the Crab Shack, the Blue Crabs' souvenir store, and the Legends Club, a facility designed for business conferences or parties.

=== Crabby Cove ===
Crabby Cove is a 54,000-gallon, artificial pond with 4 paddle boats young guests can ride. Safety netting prevents incoming baseballs from injuring patrons of Crabby Cove.

=== Basketball Court ===
For the 2016 season, the team installed two basketball hoops on a court past the left-centerfield wall. Guests are encouraged to play during any home game.

== Special events ==
=== Concerts ===
The first concert at Blue Crabs Stadium featured the rock band REO Speedwagon, who played to a crowd of over 4,000 on August 11, 2008. The ballpark also hosted a series of Southern Maryland Country Music Festival performances that included Craig Morgan, Gary Allan, John Luskey Band, Shooter Jennings, and SwampDaWamp. Trace Adkins, another notable country musician, was scheduled to perform on July 4, 2009, for a tribute to the United States Armed Forces. Hip hop artists T-Pain and Flo Rida performed on June 6, 2009. The rock band 3 Doors Down was booked for August 14, but moved when Kool Productions was offered a better deal by National Harbor with a potential of attendance up to and over 15,000. The two remaining shows for Blue Crabs Stadium were also moved to National Harbor.

=== Mid-Atlantic Classic ===
On July 15, 2009, Blue Crabs Stadium hosted the inaugural Mid-Atlantic Classic, which the Cal Ripken, Sr. Collegiate Baseball League All-Stars defeated the Valley Baseball League All-Stars, 2–1. The game was televised on MASN.

=== Soccer ===
On July 13, 2009, Blue Crabs Stadium hosted an exhibition soccer match between Crystal Palace F.C., a Football League Championship team based in London, and its U.S. affiliate, Crystal Palace Baltimore. The game was nationally televised in the United States by the Fox Soccer Channel. The English team beat the American team, 5–2.

=== Crabfest All American Games ===
In 2014 Blue Crabs Stadium hosted the second Crabfest All American Games, which is a high school and youth all-star baseball event with players from the Mid-Atlantic Region competing for spots on the CrabFest All American Teams. The game was televised on All In Broadcasting. Crabfest returned to Blue Crabs Stadium again in 2016.

=== Maryland Championship Wrestling Base Brawl ===
Blue Crabs Stadium hosted its first professional wrestling event on Saturday, June 18, 2016, featuring performers from Maryland Championship Wrestling. Headliners X-Pac, Billy Gunn, and Ron Simmons helped draw a large crowd.

=== High school graduations ===
Since 2021, Blue Crabs Stadium has hosted high school graduation ceremonies for all seven high schools within the Charles County Public Schools system in May (or June) of each year, after having previously been held at North Point High School. Charles County Public Schools decided to move graduations to Blue Crabs Stadium originally due to the COVID-19 Pandemic, but ultimately decided that the stadium was a better fit for graduations as it can hold a larger crowd. In the event of bad weather, inclement weather dates would be implemented by the school system.
