= Bergen Ballpark =

Stadium in East Rutherford, New Jersey

- Interactive map of Bergen Ballpark
- Location: East Rutherford, NJ
- Coordinates: 40°48′44″N 74°04′38″W
- Owner: New Jersey Sports and Exposition Authority
- Operator: New Jersey Sports and Exposition Authority
- Capacity: 8,000

Construction
- Cost: $22 million

Tenant
- Bergen Cliff Hawks (ALPB)

The Bergen Ballpark was a proposed 8,000-seat baseball-only stadium in East Rutherford, New Jersey, intended to be the home of the Bergen Cliff Hawks. The stadium was to be part of the larger American Dream Meadowlands project under its previous name of "Meadowlands Xanadu". Bergen Ballpark was in the planning stages since 2001, but local politics and a lease agreement between the Mills Corporation, the company who began the Xanadu project and would own the ballpark, halted plans in 2005.
