= Bergen Cliff Hawks =

Information
- League: Atlantic League of Professional Baseball
- Location: East Rutherford, New Jersey
- Ballpark: Bergen Ballpark
- Former name: Bergen Cliff Hawks
- Colors: Burgundy, black, beige, white
- Ownership: Steve Kalafer
- Media: The Record

The Bergen Cliff Hawks were a proposed minor league baseball team to be based in East Rutherford, New Jersey. The team planned to play in the Atlantic League of Professional Baseball, which is not affiliated with Major League Baseball.

The team would have played at the Bergen Ballpark, located on the site of the Xanadu Meadowlands project. The name "Cliff Hawks" refers to the raptors that inhabit the cliffs of the New Jersey Palisades which stretch through Bergen County.

== History ==
East Rutherford, as all of Bergen County, is located adjacent to New York City. Bergen County does not have any professional baseball history of its own. Much of the fanbase for the New York Yankees and the New York Mets comes from the northern New Jersey area, and the city of Newark also has commanded attention for the older and newer inceptions of the Bears. Many of the residents of Bergen County will visit Yogi Berra Stadium and the New Jersey Jackals for minor league baseball.

Since 2000 Steve Kalafer, a current investor of the Atlantic League, owner of the Somerset Patriots, and part-owner of the Camden Riversharks, tried to bring a professional baseball team to northern New Jersey. Initially the plan was for a new stadium to be built at one of two sites in Overpeck County Park. Opposition in Leonia, Ridgefield Park, and Fort Lee halted the plan within a few months. Kalafer then turned his attention to a different Ridgefield Park site just east of the New Jersey Turnpike. That proposal stalled as the Bergen freeholders opposed the issuance of $20 million in bonds for the ballpark. Kalafer then worked with the Mills Corporation to build a ballpark in conjunction with its Xanadu Meadowlands project. Over a period of five years, talks had deteriorated between Kalafer and the Mills Corp. After a failed lawsuit by Kalafer, the Cliff Hawks took a backseat to the Xanadu, and when Triple Five took ownership of the mall in 2011, the ballpark was officially cancelled, all but killing the Cliff Hawks.
