= Meritus Park =

Stadium in Hagerstown, Maryland

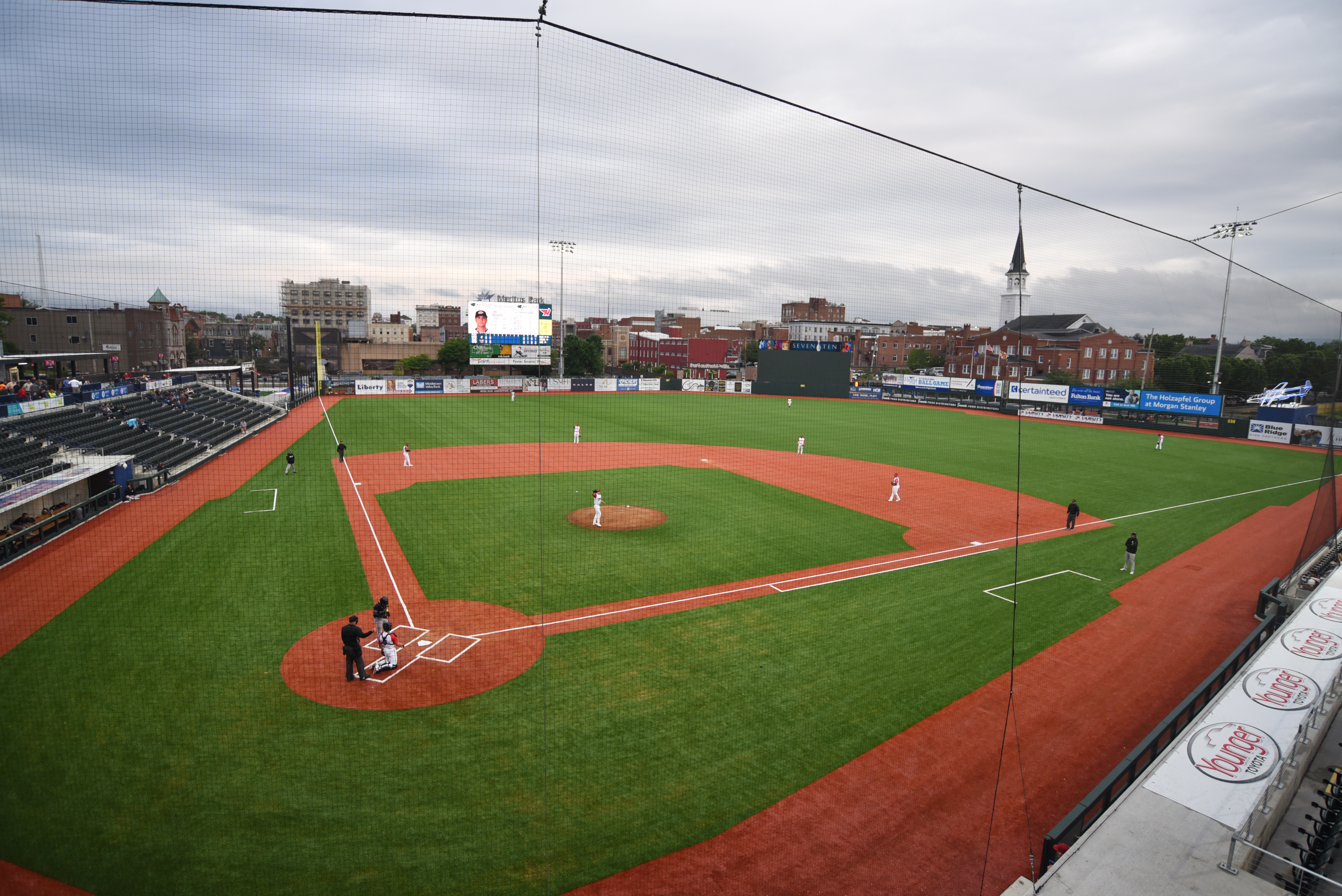
- Meritus Park in May 2024

- Location in Maryland Location in the United States
- Interactive map of Meritus Park
- Address: 50 West Baltimore Street; Hagerstown, Maryland; US
- Coordinates: 39°38′26″N 77°43′26″W
- Owner: Hagerstown-Washington County Industrial Foundation (CHIEF)
- Operator: Hagerstown-Washington County Industrial Foundation (CHIEF)
- Capacity: 4,000 (Sports); Over 4,000 (Other events)
- Record attendance: 4,896 (May 7, 2026)

Construction
- Groundbreaking: October 18, 2022
- Built: 2022–2024
- Opened: May 4, 2024
- Cost: $69.5 million
- Architect: Pendulum
- Builder: Turner Construction
- Project manager: Maryland Stadium Authority

Tenant
- Hagerstown Flying Boxcars (ALPB) 2024–present

Website
- Official website

Meritus Park is a multi-purpose stadium in Hagerstown, Maryland. It replaced Hagerstown's old Municipal Stadium which was demolished in 2022.

The facility was built primarily for the Hagerstown Flying Boxcars, a team in the Atlantic League of Professional Baseball, but it can also host other sports, outdoor concerts, festivals and community events.

The Maryland Stadium Authority oversaw development of the facility. Turner Construction designed and built it. It is owned and operated by the Hagerstown-Washington County Industrial Foundation (CHIEF).

The $69.5 million development budget mostly came from $59.5 million in bonds issued by the stadium authority, to be paid off with lottery proceeds. The then Maryland governor Larry Hogan budgeted another $8.5 million, and the Maryland General Assembly earmarked $1.5 million in its capital budget.

A groundbreaking ceremony was held on October 18, 2022. The facility opened on May 4, 2024, at less than full capacity for the first six home games of the Hagerstown Flying Boxcars.

The initial plans had the stadium at a capacity of 5,000. This was lowered to better serve non-sporting events. The stadium has 2,800 fixed seats and a capacity of 4,000 for baseball games and other sporting events and over 4,000 for other events. Despite capacity being set at 4,000, the Flying Boxcars have had several games with attendance over 4,000, with the attendance record as of July 10, 2024, being 4,257, set on June 28, 2024, in a Flying Boxcars 9–4 win over the Staten Island Ferryhawks. The stadium has eight private suites, a beer garden, a bar, and a picnic area.

In February 2024, Meritus Health and the Flying Boxcars announced a partnership that included Meritus Health acquiring the naming rights for the stadium to be called Meritus Park.
