= Virginia Beach Neptunes =

Proposed American professional baseball team

- Logo

Information
- League: Atlantic League of Professional Baseball
- Location: Virginia Beach, Virginia
- Ballpark: Wheeler Field
- Colors: Navy blue, gold, white, silver
- Retired numbers: 42
- Ownership: Virginia Beach Professional Baseball, LLC
- General manager: Joe Pinto
- Website: vbneptunes.com

The Virginia Beach Neptunes were a proposed American professional baseball team based in Virginia Beach, Virginia. They were planned to be a member of the Atlantic League of Professional Baseball, which is not affiliated with Major League Baseball. They would have been the second professional baseball club in the Hampton Roads region after the Norfolk Tides of the International League (AAA).

Virginia Beach Professional Baseball, LLC, was awarded an Atlantic League franchise in April 2013 "after more than three years of effort". In February 2014 the city council approved the team's ballpark proposal with completion expected by April 2015. It was announced in April 2015 that the Neptunes would play their home games at Wheeler Field beginning in the 2016 season, but it was later reported that the stadium would open in 2017. A May 2016 report suggested that the team would not be ready even for the 2017 season. A July 2017 reply from the team's Facebook account said, "We are still working diligently to make this happen." (That reply was later deleted, as was their Facebook account.)

The "Neptunes" name alluded to Virginia Beach's location on the Atlantic Ocean, which was commemorated by a 34 feet (10 m) bronze statue of Neptune on September 30, 2005. It was sculpted by Paul DiPasquale and established by the city's annual Neptune Festival with private donations. They would have been the second sports team in the Hampton Roads region to name itself after Neptune; the Norfolk Neptunes, a popular minor league football team in the late 1960s, also used the name.
