= Hagerstown Flying Boxcars =

Baseball team in Hagerstown, Maryland

Logo
Cap insignia

Information
- League: Atlantic League of Professional Baseball (North)
- Location: Hagerstown, Maryland
- Ballpark: Meritus Park
- Founded: 2024
- Colors: Navy, Hagerstown brick, sky blue, dark boxcar gray, light boxcar gray, white
- Mascot: Captain Stryker
- Ownership: Downtown Baseball LLC
- General manager: David Blenckstone
- Manager: Mark Minicozzi
- Media: The Herald-Mail
- Website: flyingboxcars.com

The Hagerstown Flying Boxcars are a professional baseball team that began play in 2024 in Hagerstown, Maryland. The franchise competes in the Atlantic League of Professional Baseball in the North Division and play their home games at Meritus Park.

== History ==
The team's creation was announced on September 1, 2021, with the intent to start playing in 2023. The delay to 2024 was announced in March 2022 based on the time needed to complete the stadium.

Flying Boxcars was announced as the team name on July 20, 2023. The name honors Fairchild Aircraft's production of C-82 and C-119 cargo planes at the Hagerstown Regional Airport. Fairchild Aircraft was at one point the largest employer in Washington County, Maryland, of which Hagerstown is the county seat. The Flying Boxcar became synonymous with Hagerstown, so much so that Hagerstown was occasionally referred to as the "Home of the Flying Boxcar." The name was chosen through a name-the-team contest, with the other choices being Battle Swans, Diezel Dogs, Haymakers, and Tin Lizards.

The Flying Boxcars unveiled team logos in September 2023 showing a pilot wearing an aviator hat and baseball uniform astride a C-119.

In November 2023, the club held a contest to name the team's mascot. The mascot was unveiled in February 2024 as Stryker, a fictional man whose parents were technicians at Fairchild Aircraft in Hagerstown, where the Flying Boxcars namesake C-119 plane was manufactured. Stryker was also a test pilot for Fairchild before enlisting in the Air Force when he one day embarked on a mission in the late 1960's and never returned until over a half-century later when he landed at Hagerstown Regional Airport with a new mission; to tell the story of Fairchild, and to bring back baseball to Hagerstown.

In February 2024, the club announced a partnership with Meritus Health that included Meritus becoming the sports medicine provider for the team as well as Meritus acquiring the naming rights for the stadium, naming it Meritus Park.

== Management ==
The locally based ownership, Downtown Baseball LLC, consists of Howard "Blackie" Bowen (President), Don Bowman, James Holzapfel, and Frank Boulton.

In April 2023, David Blenckstone was named the team's general manager and first employee. Blenckstone stepped down as athletic director at St. Maria Goretti Catholic High School after 13 years. Blenckstone worked for 14 years for the Hagerstown Suns, a team his father owned from 1986 to 2001. He was the Suns' general manager from 1996 to 2001.

On November 13, 2023, Mark Mason was named the team's first-ever manager.

On February 20, 2024, the team announced that Enohel Polanco would be the team's hitting coach and Manny Corpas would be the team's pitching coach for the 2024 season.

In October 2024, the Boxcars announced that they would retain Mason as manager and Polanco as hitting coach for the 2025 season, and that Arthur Rhodes would be the team's pitching coach. Rhodes was selected as Eastern League Pitcher of the Year in 1991 while pitching for the Hagerstown Suns.

In May 2025, Mark Mason was fired as the team’s manager and replaced by Shane Turner. In September 2025, the team announced that Turner would not return in 2026.

== Season-by-season record ==
Hagerstown Flying Boxcars
Season	League	Division	Overall	Win %	Finish	Manager	Playoffs
2024	ALPB	North	36–89	.288	5th	Mark Mason	Did not qualify
2025	ALPB	North	31–95	.246	5th	Mark Mason (6–21); Shane Turner (25–74)	Did not qualify
2026	ALPB	North	67–59	.532	4th	Mark Minicozzi	0-3 Lost Division Series
Totals			134–243	.355	—	—	—

== Roster ==
Hagerstown Flying Boxcars roster
Active (25-man) roster		Coaching staff
Pitchers: -- Johnny Barbato; 25 Trey Braithwaite; 7 Mike Brewer; 28 Connor Curlis; 15 Eddy Demurias; 17 Jack Eisenbarger; 32 Jason Franks; 18 Clay Helvey; 33 DJ Johnson; 13 Tommy Kane; 16 Alex Mack; 9 Jameson McGrane; 14 Connor O'Hara; 5 Brennen Oxford; 22 Cole Roland; 27 Vincent Towns; 23 Chris Wright	Catchers: 2 Daniel Arroyo; 19 Robert Brooks; 29 Alex Isola; Infielders: 6 Osvaldo Abreu; 11 Bryce Cannon; -- Jordan Peyton; 8 Cristhian Rodriguez; 4 Jeffrey Wehler; Outfielders: 10 Jared Carr; 1 Marty Costes; 12 Tyler Williams	Manager: -- Mark Minicozzi; Coaches: -- Shane Turner (bench); -- Aharon Eggleston (hitting); Disabled list; ‡ Inactive list; § Suspended list; Roster updated May 3, 2026 Transactions

== Black-Eyed Brawl ==
The Flying Boxcars have promoted an intrastate rivalry with the south division Southern Maryland Blue Crabs. The rivalry is named the "Black-Eyed Brawl" after Maryland's state flower the Black-Eyed Susan. The rivalry includes a trophy which will be awarded to the team that wins the season long series. The rivalry's inaugural edition was won by the Flying Boxcars, ten games to eight.
