= Southern Maryland Blue Crabs =

Baseball team in Waldorf, Maryland, US

Logo
Cap insignia

Information
- League: Atlantic League of Professional Baseball (South Division)
- Location: Waldorf, Maryland
- Ballpark: Blue Crabs Stadium
- Founded: 2006
- Division championships: 2009; 2012; 2013
- Colors: Columbia blue, navy, red, sand, white
- Mascot: Pinch the Crab
- Retired numbers: 42
- Ownership: Crabs on Deck, LLC
- General manager: Nathanial Giblin
- Manager: Brett Jodie
- Website: bluecrabsbaseball.com

The Southern Maryland Blue Crabs are an American professional baseball team based in Waldorf, Maryland. They are members of the South Division of the Atlantic League of Professional Baseball, an independent "partner league" of Major League Baseball. Since 2008, the Blue Crabs have played their home games at Blue Crabs Stadium. They represent the counties of Charles, Calvert, and St. Mary's, which are located on the Southern Maryland peninsula between the Chesapeake Bay and the Potomac River.

In 2006, Southern Maryland residents chose the name "Blue Crabs" in a team-sponsored fan ballot. The name refers to the indigenous blue crab, the official state crustacean of Maryland. The Blue Crabs' fanbase has been nicknamed the "Crustacean Nation", an allusion to the Cardinal Nation and the Red Sox Nation fan clubs of the St. Louis Cardinals and Boston Red Sox.

== History ==
Charles County initiated efforts to bring affiliated professional baseball, in the form of a relocated Class A Kinston Indians team, to the Southern Maryland region in 1985, but those plans fell through. The progress made on the ballpark was reversed after Charles County commissioners voted against its financial support, instead deciding to funnel money to infrastructure projects. There were also concerns about marketability of the baseball team in a then-largely rural area. However, Southern Maryland's population boomed soon after as the suburban expansion of Washington, D.C. encompassed the region.

In 2004, the town of Hughesville was targeted by Opening Day Partners to be the home of its Southern Maryland franchise, but the town's residents voted against the measure to retain the area's rural nature. After Hughesville residents denied the ballpark, all focus was shifted to Waldorf, a bedroom community of Washington, D.C. The Atlantic League formally announced an expansion team for Southern Maryland on February 15, 2006. The Blue Crabs were originally supposed to be an expansion team for the 2007 season, but the construction bids for Blue Crabs Stadium came in over budget. Instead, the Blue Crabs' inaugural season was pushed back to 2008. The team name was chosen in a name-the-team contest in Southern Maryland with six finalists to choose from: Blue Crabs, Blue Herons, Aviators, Rock Fish, Ospreys, and Eagles. Fans were able to vote online, through the mail, or at participating Southern Maryland-area Arby's Restaurants.

Initially, there was some concern about how the Blue Crabs would impact the attendance of the nearby Double-A Bowie Baysox, a Baltimore Orioles affiliate that plays approximately 32 miles (51 km) away. The Baysox anticipated a small attendance drop initially, but did not worry about the issue in the long term.

The Blue Crabs were owned by Opening Day Partners and Brooks Robinson, a former third baseman with the Baltimore Orioles from 1955 to 1977. Robinson was inducted into the National Baseball Hall of Fame in 1983. In November 2016, the team was sold to a new ownership group, Crabs On Deck, LLC, headed by Frank Boulton, the founder and CEO of the Atlantic League and owner of the Long Island Ducks and Bridgeport Bluefish.

The Blue Crabs were the runner-up in the 2009 Atlantic League Championship Series versus the Somerset Patriots. They again finished runner-up in the 2015 Atlantic League Championship Series versus Somerset.

On July 13, 2019, Blue Crabs outfielder Tony Thomas became the first player in professional baseball history to steal first base. Atlantic League/MLB rule changes introduced in 2019 allow batters to steal first base on any pitch not caught in flight.

On October 19, 2023, with the announcement of the 2024 season schedule it was announced that the Blue Crabs would now be members of the South Division with the expansion Hagerstown Flying Boxcars joining the North Division.

== Logos and uniforms ==
The Southern Maryland Blue Crabs official colors are navy blue, light blue, red, tan, and white. The primary logo depicts a navy blue crab outlined and detailed in tan. The crab has red pincers and eyes, with a scowl of determination. Centered above the crab is the "Blue Crabs" wordmark in white with the words "Southern Maryland" centered above in red with light blue and red ribbon-like lines underline the wordmark. The entire logo is outlined in tan.

The home caps are white with navy blue and light blue trim, charged with the cap logo featuring a "B" interlocking with a C-shaped crab pincer. The away caps are navy blue throughout, also charged with the interlocking "BC" cap logo. The home jerseys are white with the "Crabs" wordmark centered across the chest in navy blue with light blue outline. The away jersey is gray with the "Southern Maryland" wordmark in light blue and navy blue outline. The team wears navy blue alternate jerseys with the "Blue Crabs" wordmark centered across the chest in white. The Blue Crabs' batting practice cap is navy blue with the crab cap logo.

== Season-by-season records ==
Southern Maryland Blue Crabs
Season	W - L	Win %	Finish	Playoffs
2008	74–66	.529	2nd in Liberty Division	Did not qualify
2009	79–61	.564	1st in Liberty Division	Won first round vs. Long Island 3-2; Lost Finals vs. Somerset 3-1
2010	82–57	.590	2nd in Liberty Division	Lost first round vs. Bridgeport 3-1
2011	65–57	.492	3rd in Liberty Division	Did not qualify
2012	69–71	.557	1st in Liberty Division	Lost first round vs. Long Island 3-2
2013	65–74	.468	1st in Liberty Division	Lost first round vs. Long Island 3-0
2014	57–66	.463	4th in Liberty Division	Did not qualify
2015	69–71	.493	2nd in Freedom Division	Lost first round vs. Lancaster
2016	57–83	.407	4th in Freedom Division	Did not qualify
2017	67–73	.479	3rd in Freedom Division	Lost first round vs. York
2018	50–76	.397	4th in Freedom Division	Did not qualify
2019	59–81	.421	3rd in Freedom Division	Did not qualify
2020	Season canceled due to the COVID-19 pandemic			
2021	63–57	.525	2nd in North Division (first half); 1st in North Division (second half)	Lost first round vs. Long Island
2022	83–48	.634	1st in North Division (first half); 2nd in North Division (second half)	Lost first round vs. Lancaster
2023	64–62	.508	3rd in North Division (first half); 3rd in North Division (second half)	Did not qualify
Totals	877–847	.509	—	12–27 (.307)

The Blue Crabs tied for first place in the Liberty Division for the second half of 2009. They also won a first-round playoff series against the Long Island Ducks, 3–2, on September 29, 2009. However, they lost the championship to the Somerset Patriots.

== Philanthropy ==
The Blue Crabs hold a series of charity events benefiting organizations such as the Southern Maryland Food Bank, The Salvation Army, Juvenile Diabetes Research Fund, Soldier's Angels, Orioles Advocates, and the American Red Cross. Other events such as the Red Cross blood drive and Prostate Cancer Awareness Night are held at Blue Crabs Stadium to promote health and wellness. On the team's final game of the 2008 season, the Blue Crabs raised $8,139 for the College of Southern Maryland as part of the institution's 50th anniversary. Before the 2009 season, the team partnered with the Charles County Hospice House to allow the non-profit charity to take advantage of theme nights for fundraising opportunities.

== Mascot ==
The Southern Maryland Blue Crabs' official mascot is an anthropomorphic blue creature named Pinch. He wears a Blue Crabs home jersey and red-and-white sneakers. The mascot debuted on April 19, 2008, at the Charles County Youth League's opening-day parade at Laurel Springs Park in La Plata. Pinch's name alludes to a crab's pincer. He resides at Crabby Cove, an artificial pond designed for recreational use at Blue Crabs Stadium.

== Current roster ==
Southern Maryland Blue Crabs roster
Active roster		Coaching staff
Pitchers: 25 Devin Kirby-Williams; 32 Dylan Beck; 37 Endrys Briceno; 26 Ethan Bates; 50 Ethan Hammerberg; 40 Garrett Ouellette; 23 Connor Overton; 19 Ian Kahaloa; 3 Issac Fix; 17 Sikes; 6 Justin Sanchez; 41 Rafi Vasquez; 44 Kyle Virbitsky; 48 Pedro Santos; 28 Peyton Cariaco; Utility players: 24 Alejandro De Aza; 10 Jackson Loftin	Catchers: 27 Carlos Rojas; 15 Ryan McCarthy; Infielders: 14 Brody Fahr; 18 Jamari Baylor; 2; 9; Outfielders: 2 Stephen Paolini; 11 Danny Bautista Jr.; 22 Ethan Wilson; 13 Ezequiel Pagan	Manager: -- Brett Jodie; Coaches: 1 Jason Camilli (hitting); Disabled list; ‡ Inactive list; § Suspended list; updated April 24, 2026

== Retired numbers ==
42 (Jackie Robinson)
2B, Retired throughout professional baseball on April 15, 1997

16 Stan Cliburn Coach

== See also ==
- Sports in Washington, D.C.

Achievements
Preceded by Camden Riversharks; 2008	Liberty Division Champions; Southern Maryland Blue Crabs; 2009	Succeeded by Bridgeport Bluefish; 2010
