= Jimmy Hurst =

American baseball player (1972–2024)

- Right fielder
- Born: March 1, 1972; Tuscaloosa, Alabama, U.S.
- Died: July 6, 2024 (aged 52); Tuscaloosa, Alabama, U.S.
- Batted: Right Threw: Right

Professional debut
- MLB: September 10, 1997, for the Detroit Tigers
- NPB: March 28, 2003, for the Hiroshima Toyo Carp

Last appearance
- MLB: September 28, 1997, for the Detroit Tigers
- NPB: June 26, 2003, for the Hiroshima Toyo Carp

MLB statistics
- Batting average: .176
- Runs: 1
- Hits: 3

NPB statistics
- Batting average: .207
- Home runs: 5
- Runs batted in: 15
- Stats at Baseball Reference

Teams
- Detroit Tigers (1997); Hiroshima Toyo Carp (2003)

Jimmy O'Neal Hurst (March 1, 1972 – July 6, 2024) was an American professional baseball right fielder, designated hitter. He appeared briefly in only 13 games in one season in Major League Baseball for the Detroit Tigers in 1997. Later on he also played in Japan for the Hiroshima Toyo Carp in 2003.

== Career ==
Hurst was drafted by the Chicago White Sox in the 12th round of the 1990 amateur draft. Hurst played his first professional season with their Rookie league GCL White Sox in 1991, and his last with the Fargo-Moorhead RedHawks of the independent Northern League in 2008.

He played his last affiliated league season in 1999 for the then Toronto Blue Jays' Triple-A Syracuse Chiefs.

In 2002 while playing for the Newark Bears, Hurst was named Atlantic League MVP after hitting .341 with 100 RBIs, 35 home runs, and 150 hits.

== Death ==
Hurst died on July 6, 2024, after being hospitalized as the result of a brain bleed. He was 52.
