= Courtney Hawkins (baseball) =

American baseball player (born 1993)

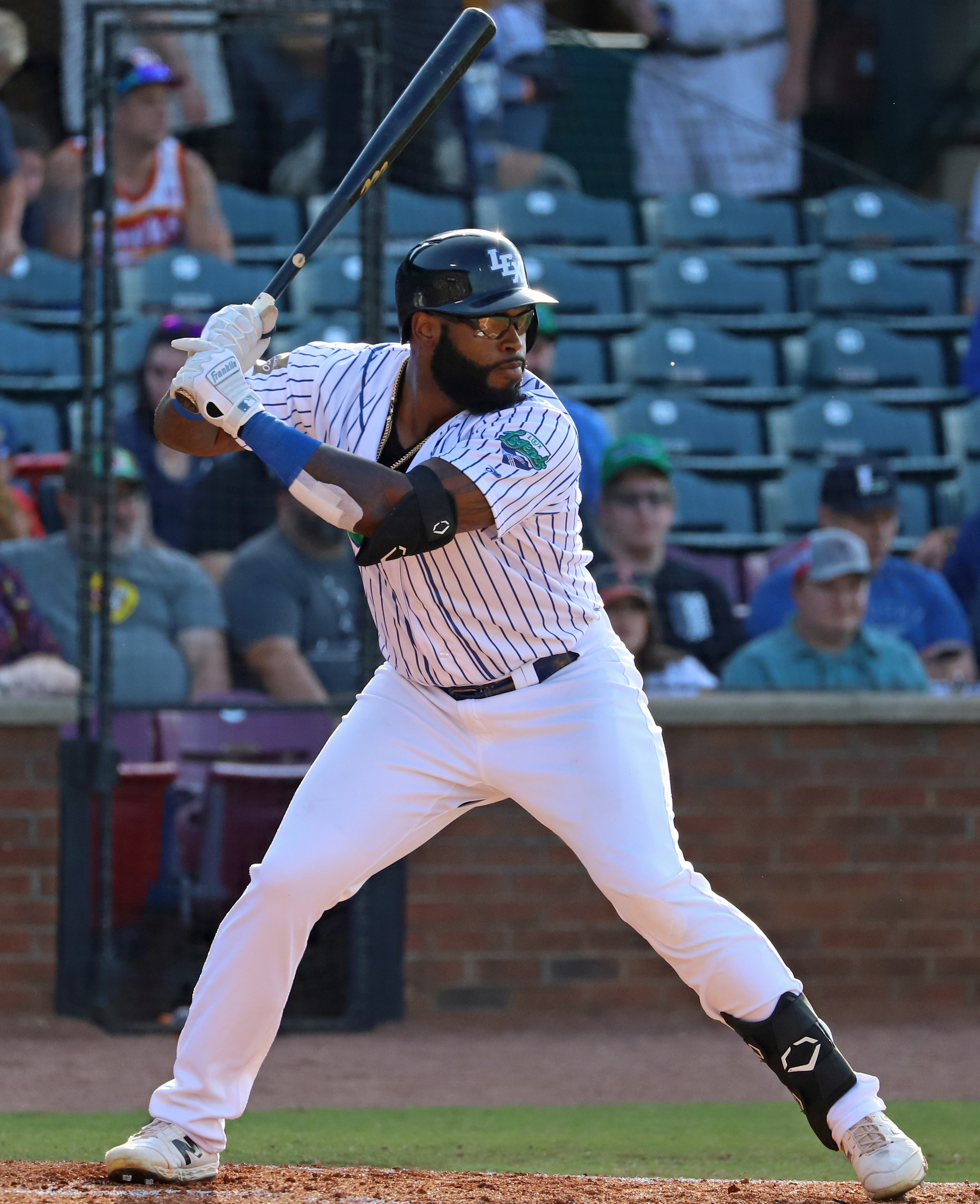
- Hawkins with the Lexington Legends in 2021
- Outfielder
- Born: November 12, 1993 (age 33); Corpus Christi, Texas, U.S.
- Batted: Right Threw: Right

NPB debut
- August 30, 2023, for the Fukuoka SoftBank Hawks

Last NPB appearance
- August 30, 2023, for the Fukuoka SoftBank Hawks

NPB statistics
- Batting average: .000
- Home runs: 0
- Runs batted in: 1
- Stats at Baseball Reference

Teams
- Fukuoka SoftBank Hawks (2023)

Courtney James Hawkins (born November 12, 1993) is an American former professional baseball outfielder. He played in Nippon Professional Baseball (NPB) for the Fukuoka SoftBank Hawks.

== Early career ==
Hawkins attended Mary Carroll High School in Corpus Christi, Texas. As a senior, he was the Texas Gatorade High School Baseball Player of the Year. He was the fifth ranked high school recruit in his class by ESPN and was committed to University of Texas at Austin.

== Professional career ==
=== Chicago White Sox ===
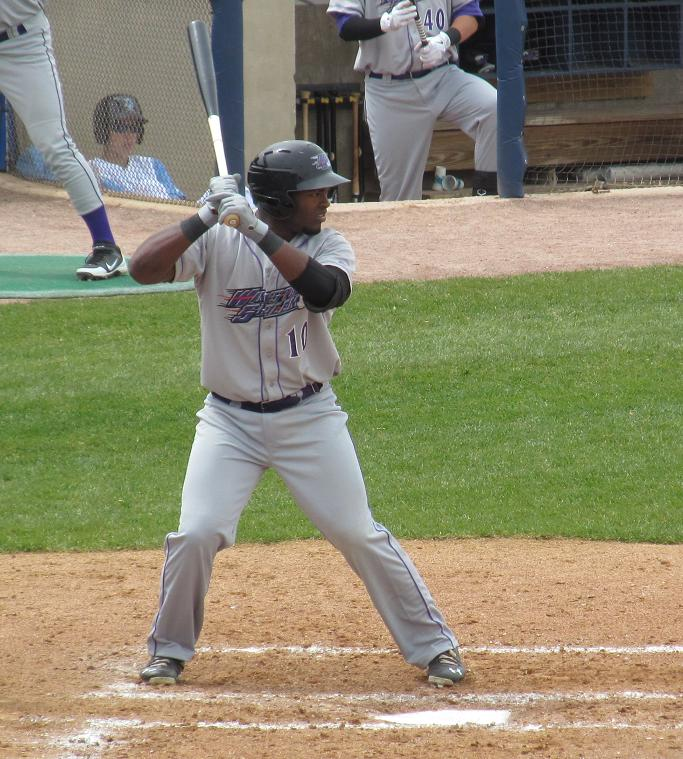
Hawkins with the Winston Salem-Dash in 2013

The Chicago White Sox selected Hawkins in the first round, with the 13th overall selection, of the 2012 Major League Baseball draft. Hawkins started his career with the rookie-level Bristol White Sox of the Appalachian League. In 38 games he hit .272/.314/.401 with three home runs and 16 runs batted in. On August 12, 2012, he was promoted to the Low-A Kannapolis Intimidators of the South Atlantic League. He hit .308/.352/.631 with four home runs and 15 runs batted in 16 games. He ended the season with the High-A Winston-Salem Dash after he was promoted on August 29, 2012. Overall, he finished his first season hitting .284/.324/.480 with eight home runs and 33 runs batted in 59 games. Hawkins was ranked the White Sox #1 prospect at the start of the 2013 season. He was also ranked as the #55 ranked prospect in baseball according to Baseball America and #68 by MLB.com. Hawkins spent the whole 2013 season with High-A Winston-Salem Dash. He struggled in his first full season, batting .178 with 19 home runs and 160 strikeouts in 383 at-bats.

Hawkins returned to Winston-Salem in 2014, batting .249 with 19 home runs and 84 RBIs. He spent 2015 with the Double-A Birmingham Barons, batting .243 with nine home runs and 41 RBIs, and 2016 with Birmingham, posting a .203 average with 12 home runs and 60 RBIs. In 2017, he played for Kannapolis, Winston-Salem and Birmingham, posting a combined .205 average with 12 home runs and 33 RBIs in 91 total games between both teams. Hawkins was released from the organization on April 18, 2018.

=== Sugar Land Skeeters ===
On April 26, 2018, Hawkins signed with the Sugar Land Skeeters of the Atlantic League of Professional Baseball. Hawkins appeared in 88 games for the Skeeters and hit .285/.342/.505 with 54 runs, 17 doubles, 18 home runs, 72 RBIs, and 12 stolen bases.

=== Cincinnati Reds ===
On August 10, 2018, Hawkins' contract was purchased by the Cincinnati Reds. Hawkins spent the remainder of the year with the High-A Daytona Tortugas, hitting .246/.310/.354 with 2 home runs, 4 RBI, and 3 stolen bases in 17 games.

In 2019, he played in 3 games for the Double-A Chattanooga Lookouts before being promoted to Triple-A. However, he struggled to find his footing in 16 games for the Louisville Bats, hitting .167/.196/.352 with 2 home runs and 4 RBI. He was released by the Reds organization on May 3, 2019.

=== Sugar Land Skeeters (second stint) ===
On May 10, 2019, Hawkins signed with the Sugar Land Skeeters of the Atlantic League of Professional Baseball. Playing in 3 games, he went 6-for-12 (.500) with 2 home runs and 3 RBI.

=== San Francisco Giants ===
On May 14, 2019, Hawkins's contract was purchased by the San Francisco Giants and he was assigned to the Triple-A Sacramento River Cats. Despite the assignment, he spent the year with the High-A San Jose Giants. In an August 26 game against the Stockton Ports, Hawkins tied San Jose records for hits (5) and home runs (3) in a game, tallying on 6 RBI as well. In 88 games for the team, Hawkins hit .256/.314/.497 with 21 home runs and 59 RBI. He became a free agent following the season on November 4.

In July 2020, Hawkins signed on to play for the Skeeters of the Constellation Energy League, a makeshift four-team independent league created as a result of the COVID-19 pandemic, for the 2020 season. He was named to the league's all-star team.

=== Lexington Legends ===
On May 4, 2021, Hawkins signed with the Lexington Legends of the Atlantic League of Professional Baseball. In Game 4 of the Atlantic League's championship series, Hawkins hit three home runs in the Legends 13–2 victory over the Long Island Ducks, clinching the franchise's first league championship. Hawkins was named the most valuable player of the series.

In 2022, Hawkins played in 127 games for Lexington, batting .298/.399/.655 with 48 home runs, 125 RBI, and 6 stolen bases. Following the regular season, he was named an Atlantic League All-Star, and the Atlantic League Player of the Year. In addition, Hawkins was named the 2022 Independent Player Of The Year by Baseball America.

=== Fukuoka SoftBank Hawks ===
On December 21, 2022, Hawkins signed with the Fukuoka SoftBank Hawks of Nippon Professional Baseball. In three games for the Hawks in 2023, Hawkins went 0–for–9 with one RBI. On December 4, SoftBank announced that Hawkins would not return to the team, making him a free agent.

=== Pericos de Puebla ===
On April 22, 2024, Hawkins signed with the Pericos de Puebla of the Mexican League. In seven games for Puebla, he went 4–for–25 (.160) with one RBI. On May 10, Hawkins was released by Puebla.

=== Charleston Dirty Birds ===
On May 17, 2024, Hawkins signed with the Charleston Dirty Birds of the Atlantic League of Professional Baseball. In 16 games for Charleston, he hit .219/.265/.484 with five home runs and 14 RBI. Hawkins became a free agent following the season.
