= Atlantic League of Professional Baseball =

American independent baseball league

- Current season, competition or edition: 2025 Atlantic League season
- Classification: Independent baseball
- Sport: Baseball
- Founded: 1998
- President: Rick White
- No. of teams: 9
- Country: United States
- Most recent champion: Long Island Ducks (2026)
- Most titles: Somerset Patriots (6)
- Website: atlanticleague.com

The Atlantic League of Professional Baseball (ALPB) is a professional independent baseball league in the United States. It is an official MLB Partner League based in the Mid-Atlantic and Southeastern United States, and the headquarters are located at Penn Medicine Park in Lancaster, Pennsylvania.

The Atlantic League mostly operates in cities not served by Major League Baseball (MLB) or Minor League Baseball (MiLB) teams; most of its teams are within suburbs and exurbs too close to other teams in the organized baseball system to have minor league franchises of their own. The Atlantic League requires cities to have a market for a 4,000- to 7,500-seat ballpark and to maintain the facility at or above Triple-A standards. When MLB clubs sign Atlantic League professionals, they usually start in their Double-A or Triple-A affiliates.

The league uses a pitch clock and limits the time between innings to speed up the game. In 2019, the Atlantic League began a three-year partnership with Major League Baseball allowing MLB to implement changes to Atlantic League playing rules, in order to observe the effects of potential future rule changes and equipment. In 2020, the Atlantic League, together with the American Association, the Frontier League, and the Pioneer League, expanded this agreement to become an official MLB Partner League.

The Atlantic League is generally regarded as the most successful and highest level of baseball among independent leagues, and is comparable to the Double-A level. The Atlantic League has had more marquee players than any other independent league, including Jose Canseco, Mat Latos, Steve Lombardozzi Jr., Francisco Rodríguez, Chien-Ming Wang, Roger Clemens, Rich Hill, Scott Kazmir, Juan González, Pablo Sandoval and Dontrelle Willis. Two former Atlantic League players are in the National Baseball Hall of Fame and Museum, Tim Raines and Rickey Henderson. Gary Carter, another Hall of Famer, managed in the league. The Atlantic League has had many notable managers and coaches, including Wally Backman, Frank Viola, Tommy John, Sparky Lyle, and Bud Harrelson. The Atlantic League has consistently posted higher per game and per season attendance numbers than other independent circuits such as the American Association, Frontier League and Pioneer League.

== History ==
In 1998, the Atlantic League of Professional Baseball played its inaugural season, with teams in Bridgewater, Newark, and Atlantic City, New Jersey; Nashua, New Hampshire; Newburgh, New York; and Bridgeport, Connecticut. The creation of the league was the result of the New York Mets' objection to Frank Boulton's proposal to move the former Albany-Colonie Yankees because of its territorial rights to the region. Boulton, a Long Island, New York native, decided to create a new league that would have a higher salary cap for its players and a longer season than most of the other independent baseball organizations. He modeled the Atlantic League after the older Pacific Coast League, with facilities that exceed AAA-level standards. Boulton also emphasized signing players of Major League Baseball experience for all Atlantic League teams, raising the level of play above other independent leagues.

In 2010, the league announced that it would be expanding to Sugar Land, Texas and adding its first franchise not located in an Atlantic coast state. The Sugar Land Skeeters began play in 2012. In 2010, amid financial struggles, the Newark Bears moved from the Atlantic League to the Can-Am League, leaving the Bridgeport Bluefish and Somerset Patriots as the only teams remaining from the league's inaugural season. In the summer of 2013, then-ALPB President Frank Boulton announced that he would be resigning so that he could devote more time to operating the Long Island Ducks. He was replaced by longtime high-ranking Major League Baseball executive Rick White. On July 8, 2015, the Atlantic League began using Rawlings baseballs with red and blue seams, virtually unused in the sport since the American League swapped the blue in their seams for red in 1934.

On September 1, 2015, the Atlantic League announced conditional approval for an expansion team or a relocated team to play in New Britain, Connecticut for the 2016 season. On October 21, 2015, the Camden Riversharks announced they would cease operations immediately due to the inability to reach an agreement on lease terms with the owner of Campbell's Field, the Camden County Improvement Authority. The team was replaced by the New Britain Bees for the 2016 season. On May 29, 2016, Jennie Finch was the guest manager for the league's Bridgeport Bluefish, thus becoming the first woman to manage a professional baseball team.

Shortly before the conclusion of the 2017 season, the city of Bridgeport, Connecticut voted to not continue with professional baseball in the city and announced plans to convert The Ballpark at Harbor Yard into a music amphitheater; the Bridgeport Bluefish announced plans to relocate to High Point, North Carolina in 2019 when the construction of a new multipurpose facility in High Point is completed. League officials announced the return of the Pennsylvania Road Warriors, an all road game team, to keep the league at an even eight teams while the Bluefish go inactive for the 2018 season.

In 2015, the Atlantic League experienced a watershed moment for independent baseball when it signed a formal agreement with Major League Baseball which put into writing the rules which the ALPB would follow in selling its players' contracts to MLB clubs and their affiliates. This marked the first time that MLB, which has enjoyed a U.S. Supreme Court-granted antitrust exemption since 1922, had made any formal agreement with or acknowledgment of an independent baseball league.

=== 2020s ===
In 2020, due to the COVID-19 pandemic, the league announced that it would be unable to operate for the 2020 season with the current 8-member ballclubs, thereby canceling its season. Several teams (Somerset, York, and Lancaster) did not gain the necessary approval from governmental and health officials to open their ballparks to the capacity level necessary for competition. They used their stadiums to host recreational and community-based events, as well as local baseball activities where allowed. Meanwhile, the Long Island Ducks, High Point Rockers, and Southern Maryland Blue Crabs initially attempted to partner with teams from other leagues to play a 70-game season from mid-July through the end of September. However, due to ongoing restrictions and capacity limitations, they ultimately decided to suspend all baseball activities for the 2020 season. The only team that played in 2020 was the Sugar Land Skeeters, who would create a new 4-team independent league in Texas, with all 60 games played at Constellation Field, and the Somerset Patriots, who played weekend games with a second squad called the New Jersey Blasters.

In July 2020, the league announced the addition of a new franchise in Gastonia, North Carolina beginning in 2021; it was the league's second team based in North Carolina.

In November 2020, the Atlantic League lost its last charter franchise and its westernmost franchise when both teams became official minor league affiliates. On November 7, the Somerset Patriots announced that they were leaving the league to join the MLB-affiliated Eastern League, where they will replace the Trenton Thunder as the Double-A affiliate of the New York Yankees. Approximately two weeks later, the Houston Astros announced that they had purchased a controlling stake in the Sugar Land Skeeters and, as a result, the Skeeters would become the Astros' Triple-A affiliate and join the Pacific Coast League.

On February 18, 2021, the league announced the addition of the Lexington Legends, previously the Class A South Atlantic League affiliate of the Kansas City Royals, for the 2021 season. The Charleston Dirty Birds, formerly the West Virginia Power of the South Atlantic League, announced their move to the league on February 24, 2021.

On September 1, 2021, the league announced the addition of a new Hagerstown, Maryland franchise with the intent to begin play in 2023 pending ballpark construction. In 2022 it was announced that the team wouldn't begin play until 2024 due to construction delays.

In 2022, Kelsie Whitmore signed with the Staten Island FerryHawks of the Atlantic League, and started a game for them in left field; this made her the first woman to start an Atlantic League game. Later that year she became the first woman to pitch in an Atlantic League game when she made her first pitching appearance for Staten Island; entering the game with the bases loaded and two outs, she retired Ryan Jackson, a former major leaguer, on a fly out to end the inning.

On July 20, 2023, the Hagerstown team announced that they would be named the Hagerstown Flying Boxcars. In September 2023 it was announced that Spire City Ghost Hounds would be on hiatus during the 2024 season due to the league now having an odd number of teams with the addition of the Hagerstown franchise. The team was set to return for the 2025 season; however, the Ghost Hounds were not listed on the 2025 season schedule and would later announce an intent to return in 2026 based on the Atlantic League's plans for expansion.

On November 22, 2023, the Atlantic League terminated the membership of the Gastonia Honey Hunters, citing significant unpaid debts to the league. Rick White, president of the Atlantic League, confirmed that the Honey Hunters were terminated, but said that the Atlantic League intended to field a team in Gastonia in 2024. In February 2024, the league named Zawyer Sports & Entertainment as the new owners for the 2024 season with the team name, Gastonia Ghost Peppers, announced in October 2024. The Ghost Peppers played their first game on April 25, 2024, a 3–2 loss to the Southern Maryland Blue Crabs. In September 2026, the Ghost Peppers ceased operations after three seasons.

=== Experimental rules ===
==== 2019 ====
In March 2019, the Atlantic League and Major League Baseball reached agreement to test multiple rule changes during the 2019 Atlantic League season:

- Use of a radar tracking system to assist umpires in calling balls and strikes
- Reducing the time between half innings by 20 seconds, from 2 minutes 5 seconds to 1:45
- Requiring pitchers to face at least three batters
  - Exceptions: side is retired or injury
- Banning mound visits
  - Exceptions: pitching change or for medical issues
- Restricting infield shifts
  - Two infielders must be positioned on each side of second base
- Increasing the size of bases from 15 inches (38 cm) to 18 inches (46 cm)
  - The size of home plate is not altered
- Moving the pitching rubber on the pitcher's mound back 24 inches (61 cm)
  - This change would have taken effect in the second half of the season

In April 2019, implementation of two of the changes was delayed:

- The tracking system for calling balls and strikes "will be implemented gradually over the course of the 2019 season"
- Moving the pitching rubber back will not occur until the second half of the 2020 Atlantic League season; this rule change was never implemented.

The tracking system for calling balls and strikes was introduced at the league's all-star game on July 10. In addition to rule changes noted above, additional changes being implemented for the second half of the league's 2019 season are:

- Pitchers required to step off rubber to attempt pickoff
- One foul bunt permitted with two strikes
- Batters may "steal" first base
  - "Any pitched ball not caught by the catcher shall be subject to the same baserunning rules for the batter as an uncaught third strike, with the exception of the first base occupied with less than two out exclusion."
- "Check swings" more batter-friendly
  - "In making his ruling, the base umpire should determine whether the batter's wrists 'rolled over' during an attempt to strike at the ball and, if not, call the pitch a ball."

==== 2021 ====
The Atlantic League and MLB jointly announced that the former would adopt several additional experimental rules for the 2021 season:

- The automated ball-strike calling system introduced for 2019 remains in use, but has been tweaked. The strike zone, which had been a three-dimensional space above home plate in 2019, changed to a two-dimensional space measured at the front of home plate.
- A "double-hook" rule is in force for the entire season. Under this rule, once a team removes its starting pitcher, it loses the right to use a designated hitter for the rest of the game.
- During the second half of the season (starting on August 3), the pitcher's rubber was moved back 1 foot (30 cm), making the distance between the front edge of the rubber to the rear point of home plate 61 feet 6 inches (18.75 m).
- The player salaries was raised to a minimum of $13,800 per year.

==== 2022 ====
In January 2022, the Atlantic League announced they would no longer be using the following rules for the 2022 season:

- The automated ball-strike system that was first introduced in 2019, would no longer be used to assist home plate umpires in making ball or strike decisions. While the Atlantic League discontinued the use of the system, MLB opted to use the system in Spring Training games and in Triple A for the 2022 season.
- The distance of the pitching rubber to home plate went back to its original length, 60 feet 6 inches, down from 61 feet 6 inches. The mound was first moved a foot back (from 60 feet 6 inches to 61 feet 6 inches) on August 3, 2021, half-way through the 2021 season.

In March 2022, the MLB announced modifications to the "double-hook" rule and reintroduced the "dropped pitch" rule for the 2023 season:

- The "double-hook" rule was modified so that clubs do not lose their designated hitter if their starting pitcher completes at least five innings.
- The "dropped pitch" rule allows batters to attempt to advance for first on any pitch not caught in the air by the catcher, even with a runner on first. Those that reach first base will be awarded a hit.

==== 2023 ====
In April 2023, it was announced that the Atlantic League would be testing three rules for the 2023 season:

- The "designated pinch-runner" rule will have clubs designate a pinch runner that is not in the starting line up. That player can be substituted into the game at any point as a baserunner, but unlike typical substitutions the player that is substituted for as well as the pinch-runner will be allowed to return to the game with no penalty.
- Pitchers will be allowed only one disengagement per at-bat. Any additional disengagements will be counted as a balk unless an out is recorded.
- The "double-hook" rule will continue being used in its 2022 form.

==== 2024 ====
- The player salaries was raised to a minimum of $30,250 per year.

== Teams ==
| Team | Founded | Joined | City | Stadium | Capacity |
North Division
| Hagerstown Flying Boxcars | 2021 | 2024 | Hagerstown, Maryland | Meritus Park | 5,500 |
| Lancaster Stormers | 2003 | 2005 | Lancaster, Pennsylvania | Penn Medicine Park | 8,000 |
| Long Island Ducks | 1998 | 2000 | Central Islip, New York | Fairfield Properties Ballpark | 8,002 |
| Staten Island FerryHawks | 2021 | 2022 | Staten Island, New York | SIUH Community Park | 8,171 |
| York Revolution | 2006 | 2007 | York, Pennsylvania | WellSpan Park | 7,500 |
South Division
| Charleston Dirty Birds | 1987 | 2021 | Charleston, West Virginia | GoMart Ballpark | 4,500 |
| High Point Rockers | 2018 | 2019 | High Point, North Carolina | Truist Point | 8,500 |
| Lexington Legends | 2001 | 2021 | Lexington, Kentucky | CommonSpirit Ballpark | 9,994 |
| Southern Maryland Blue Crabs | 2006 | 2008 | Waldorf, Maryland | Blue Crabs Stadium | 6,200 |

=== Map of teams ===
Locations of the current North and South division teams

=== League timeline ===
League members Moved to another league

=== Former teams ===
| Team | City | Stadium | Seasons | History |
|---|---|---|---|---|
| Aberdeen Arsenal | Bel Air, Maryland | Thomas Run Park | 2000 | Replaced by the Aberdeen IronBirds (Orioles Class-A affiliate) |
| Atlantic City Surf | Atlantic City, New Jersey | The Sandcastle | 1998–2006 | Moved to Can-Am League, folded prior to the 2009 season |
| Bridgeport Bluefish | Bridgeport, Connecticut | The Ballpark at Harbor Yard | 1998–2017 | Folded when they lost the lease on their ballpark; replaced by the High Point Rockers |
| Camden Riversharks | Camden, New Jersey | Campbell's Field | 2001–2015 | Replaced by the New Britain Bees |
| Gastonia Honey Hunters | Gastonia, North Carolina | CaroMont Health Park | 2021–2023 | ALPB terminated league membership over more than $1 million in unpaid debt; replaced by the Gastonia Ghost Peppers |
| Gastonia Ghost Peppers | Gastonia, North Carolina | CaroMont Health Park | 2024-2026 | Folded after the 2026 season. |
| Lehigh Valley Black Diamonds | Quakertown, Pennsylvania | Quakertown Memorial Stadium | 1999–2001 | Formerly the Newburgh Black Diamonds (1998), became the first Pennsylvania Road Warriors |
| Nashua Pride | Nashua, New Hampshire | Holman Stadium | 1998–2005 | Moved to Can-Am League, later relocated to Pittsfield, Massachusetts, folded at the end of the 2011 season |
| Newark Bears | Newark, New Jersey | Bears & Eagles Riverfront Stadium | 1998–2010 | Moved to Can-Am League, folded prior to the 2014 season |
| Newburgh Black Diamonds | Newburgh, New York | Delano-Hitch Stadium | 1998 | Became the Lehigh Valley Black Diamonds (1999–2001), which became the first Pennsylvania Road Warriors (2002–2004) |
| New Britain Bees | New Britain, Connecticut | New Britain Stadium | 2016–2019 | Moved to Futures Collegiate Baseball League; Replaced by the Road Warriors for the 2020 season |
| Somerset Patriots | Bridgewater Township, New Jersey | TD Bank Ballpark | 1998–2020 | Moved to Minor League Baseball as part of MiLB realignment; became New York Yankees Double-A affiliate. |
| Spire City Ghost Hounds | Frederick, Maryland | Nymeo Field at Harry Grove Stadium | 2023 | Added to keep the league at an even number of teams, have been inactive since the 2023 season. |
| Sugar Land Skeeters | Sugar Land, Texas | Constellation Field | 2012–2020 | Moved to Minor League Baseball as part of MiLB realignment; became Houston Astros Triple-A affiliate. |
| Wild Health Genomes | Lexington, Kentucky | Wild Health Field | 2022 | Replaced by the Spire City Ghost Hounds in Frederick, Maryland. |

==== Proposed teams that never played ====
| Team | City | Stadium | Planned start |
|---|---|---|---|
| Bergen Cliff Hawks | East Rutherford, New Jersey | Bergen Ballpark | 2000–2011 |
| Loudoun Hounds | Ashburn, Virginia | Edelman Financial Field | 2012–2016 |
| Virginia Beach Neptunes | Virginia Beach, Virginia | Wheeler Field | 2016–2017 |

== Championship Series ==
The ALPB Championship Series is played as a best-of-five. Numbers in parentheses denote the number of championships won by a team to that point, when more than one.

| Year | Winner | Runner-up | Result | Championship Series MVP |
|---|---|---|---|---|
| 1998 | Atlantic City Surf | Bridgeport Bluefish | 3–1 | Chris Eddy |
| 1999 | Bridgeport Bluefish | Somerset Patriots | 3–0 | Duane Singleton |
| 2000 | Nashua Pride | Somerset Patriots | 3–0 | D.J. Boston |
| 2001 | Somerset Patriots | Newark Bears | 3–2 | Robert Dodd |
| 2002 | Newark Bears | Bridgeport Bluefish | 3–0 | Jimmy Hurst |
| 2003 | Somerset Patriots (2) | Nashua Pride | 3–2 | Jeff Nettles |
| 2004 | Long Island Ducks | Camden Riversharks | 3–0 | Justin Davies |
| 2005 | Somerset Patriots (3) | Nashua Pride | 3–0 | Mark DiFelice |
| 2006 | Lancaster Barnstormers | Bridgeport Bluefish | 3–0 | Jeremy Todd |
| 2007 | Newark Bears (2) | Somerset Patriots | 3–1 | José Herrera |
| 2008 | Somerset Patriots (4) | Camden Riversharks | 3–1 | Brandon Larson |
| 2009 | Somerset Patriots (5) | Southern Maryland Blue Crabs | 3–1 | Jeff Nettles |
| 2010 | York Revolution | Bridgeport Bluefish | 3–0 | Ramón Castro |
| 2011 | York Revolution (2) | Long Island Ducks | 3–1 | Vince Harrison |
| 2012 | Long Island Ducks (2) | Lancaster Barnstormers | 3–2 | Dan Lyons |
| 2013 | Long Island Ducks (3) | Somerset Patriots | 3–2 | John Brownell |
| 2014 | Lancaster Barnstormers (2) | Sugar Land Skeeters | 3–0 | Gabe Jacobo |
| 2015 | Somerset Patriots (6) | Southern Maryland Blue Crabs | 3–1 | Roy Merritt |
| 2016 | Sugar Land Skeeters | Long Island Ducks | 3–0 | Juan Martinez |
| 2017 | York Revolution (3) | Long Island Ducks | 3–0 | Telvin Nash / Chase Huchingson |
| 2018 | Sugar Land Skeeters (2) | Long Island Ducks | 3–2 | James Russell |
| 2019 | Long Island Ducks (4) | Sugar Land Skeeters | 3–2 | Deibinson Romero |
| 2020 | Season cancelled due to COVID-19 pandemic | | | |
| 2021 | Lexington Legends | Long Island Ducks | 3–1 | Courtney Hawkins |
| 2022 | Lancaster Barnstormers (3) | High Point Rockers | 3–0 | Oscar De La Cruz |
| 2023 | Lancaster Barnstormers (4) | Gastonia Honey Hunters | 3–2 | Brent Teller |
| 2024 | York Revolution (4) | Charleston Dirty Birds | 3–0 | Jacob Rhinesmith |
| 2025 | York Revolution (5) | High Point Rockers | 3–1 | TBA |
| 2026 | Long Island Ducks (5) | Southern Maryland Blue Crabs | 3–0 | Nick Margevicius |

== All-Star Games ==
| Year | Location | Stadium | Winner | Score |
|---|---|---|---|---|
| 1998 | Atlantic City, New Jersey | The Sandcastle | Atlantic City | 6–4 |
| 1999 | Bridgeport, Connecticut | The Ballpark at Harbor Yard | South | 8–3 |
| 2000 | Bridgewater, New Jersey | Commerce Bank Ballpark | North | 2–0 |
| 2001 | Newark, New Jersey | Bears & Eagles Riverfront Stadium | North | 10–0 |
| 2002 | Central Islip, New York | Citibank Park | South | 4–1 |
| 2003 | Nashua, New Hampshire | Holman Stadium | South | 2–1 |
| 2004 | Camden, New Jersey | Campbell's Field | North | 10–8 |
| 2005 | Atlantic City, New Jersey | The Sandcastle | North | 9–6 |
| 2006 | Bridgeport, Connecticut | The Ballpark at Harbor Yard | North | 4–1 |
| 2007 | Lancaster, Pennsylvania | Clipper Magazine Stadium | North | 8–6 |
| 2008 | Bridgewater, New Jersey | Commerce Bank Ballpark | Freedom | 8–6 |
| 2009 | Newark, New Jersey | Bears & Eagles Riverfront Stadium | Liberty | 7–5 |
| 2010 | Central Islip, New York | Suffolk County Sports Park | Liberty | 7–1 |
| 2011 | York, Pennsylvania | Sovereign Bank Stadium | Freedom | 7–0 |
| 2012 | Camden, New Jersey | Campbell's Field | Freedom | 9–5 |
| 2013 | Waldorf, Maryland | Regency Furniture Stadium | Freedom | 2–1 |
| 2014 | Sugar Land, Texas | Constellation Field | Sugar Land | 5–3 |
| 2015 | Bridgeport, Connecticut | The Ballpark at Harbor Yard | Freedom | 5–1 |
| 2016 | Lancaster, Pennsylvania | Clipper Magazine Stadium | Freedom | 3–1 |
| 2017 | Bridgewater, New Jersey | TD Bank Ballpark | Freedom | 10–3 |
| 2018 | Central Islip, New York | Bethpage Ballpark | Liberty | 4–3 |
| 2019 | York, Pennsylvania | PeoplesBank Park | Freedom | 3–3† |
| 2020 | None (season cancelled due to COVID-19 pandemic) | | | |
| 2021 | None | | | |
| 2022 | None | | | |
| 2023 | None | | | |
| 2024 | None | | | |
| 2025 | None | | | |

† Freedom Division won the 2019 game in a "homer-off" after the teams were tied at the end of nine innings.

== Major League Baseball players ==
Some Atlantic League players have come from, or advanced to, the higher ranks of Major League Baseball. Some have resurrected their careers and returned to the majors, while others played in the independent league during the start or end of their careers. The following is a list of some of those players:

- Ruben Sierra - Played for the Atlantic City Surf in 1999 after more than a decade in MLB. Returned to the Texas Rangers in 2000 and named American League Comeback Player of the Year in 2001.
- Jose Canseco - Played for the Newark Bears in 2001 after a long MLB career. Returned to the majors for the Chicago White Sox.
- Tim Raines - Played for the Somerset Patriots briefly in 2000. Returned to the Montreal Expos in 2001.
- Carlos Baerga - Played for the Long Island Ducks in 2001. Returned to the Boston Red Sox in 2002.
- Rickey Henderson - Played for the Newark Bears in 2003 before signing with the Los Angeles Dodgers. Henderson then returned to the Newark Bears in 2004, his final season in the Atlantic League.
- Stephen Drew - Drafted in the first round in 2004 by the Arizona Diamondbacks. Played 19 games for the Camden Riversharks in 2005 before agreeing to terms with the Diamondbacks. Drew played for several major league teams and won a World Series with the Red Sox in 2013.
- Ross Detwiler - Drafted in the first round in 2007 by the Washington Nationals. Became a key member of Nationals' pitching staff in 2011 and 2012 and pitched well in the franchise's first playoff series since moving from Montreal. Bounced around several teams, then signed with the York Revolution in 2018. Called back to several MLB teams, including the Miami Marlins in 2021.
- Steve Lombardozzi Jr. - Drafted in the 19th round in 2008 by the Washington Nationals. Bounced around several teams, then signed with the Southern Maryland Blue Crabs in 2016. Advanced back to MLB later that year but did not play much and signed with the Long Island Ducks in 2019.
- Brandon Phillips - Drafted by the Montreal Expos in 2002. He went on to play 10 seasons with the Cincinnati Reds. In 2021, it was announced that he would join the Lexington Legends as a player and part-owner.
- Pablo Sandoval - Played for the Staten Island FerryHawks in 2024 and 2025 after playing in MLB with the San Francisco Giants (2008–2014, 2017–2020), Boston Red Sox (2015–2017), and Atlanta Braves (2020–2021).
- Trevor Bauer

== See also ==
- Baseball awards#U.S. independent professional leagues
